= Destroy All Humans! (disambiguation) =

Destroy All Humans! is an open-world action-adventure video game series. It may also refer to:

== Games in the video game series ==
- Destroy All Humans! (2005 video game), the first game in the series
- Destroy All Humans! 2 (2006), the second game in the series
- Destroy All Humans! Big Willy Unleashed (2008)
- Destroy All Humans! Path of the Furon (2008)
- Destroy All Humans! (2020 video game), a remake of the first game
- Destroy All Humans! 2: Reprobed (2022), a remake of the second game

== Other uses ==
- Destroy All Humans. They Can't Be Regenerated. (2018–present), a manga series
- Destroy All Humans, a 2020 studio album by Hittman
