= J. Grant Albrecht =

American actor (born 1966)

- Born: John Grant Albrecht; May 22, 1966 (age 60); Marin County, California, U.S.
- Other names: John Albrecht; Grant Albrecht; Charles Fathy
- Education: Carnegie Mellon University
- Occupations: Actor; speech writer; presentation coach; motivational speaker
- Years active: 1990–present

Johnathan Grant Albrecht (born May 22, 1966) is an American Broadway, TV, and film actor. His voice acting work can also be heard in animation, commercials, and video games. Albrecht also works as a motivational speaker and speechwriter.

== Education ==
Albrecht was a graduate of Carnegie Mellon University, majoring in acting.

== Career ==
In film, he had minor roles in Voodoo Dawn, S.W.A.T. and played Jacques Chirac in the biographical film W.. In television, he made various guest appearances in Law & Order, Walker, Texas Ranger, Touched by an Angel, Just Shoot Me!, Malcolm in the Middle, The Guardian, ER, Brothers & Sisters, Criminal Minds, In Plain Sight, Rizzoli & Isles, and Notorious. On Broadway, he performed at Circle in the Square Theatre in a production of The Devil's Disciple, directed by Stephen Porter and The Shadow Box, directed by Jack Hofsiss.

=== Voice acting ===
In film, he performed additional voice over work for The Jungle Book 2, Cowboy Bebop: The Movie, Tom and Jerry: The Fast and the Furry, Dante's Inferno: An Animated Epic, Happy Feet, and Hellboy: Blood and Iron. In television, he did voice work in animated television series such as Oswald, Justice League, All Grown Up!, My Life as a Teenage Robot, Higglytown Heroes, and Yukikaze. In video games, he was most notable for voicing Crypto in Destroy All Humans!.

== Filmography ==
=== Film ===
Year	Title	Role	Notes
1990	Voodoo Dawn	Tony	
2001	Cowboy Bebop: The Movie	Hoffman	Voice, English dub
2003	The Jungle Book 2	Additional Voices	Uncredited
2003	S.W.A.T.	Desk Sergeant	Uncredited
2005	Tom and Jerry: The Fast and the Furry	Clown-O, Security Guard	Voice, direct-to-video
2006	Happy Feet	Additional Voices	
2007	Hellboy: Blood and Iron	Oliver Trombolt, Additional Voices	Television film
2010	Dante's Inferno: An Animated Epic	Farinata, Ciacco	Voice, direct-to-video
2013	Bayonetta: Bloody Fate	Balder	Voice, English dub

=== Television ===
Year	Title	Role	Notes
1992	Loving	Crank Caller #1	2 episodes
1993	Law & Order	Boyd	Episode: "Discord"
1999–2000	Walker, Texas Ranger	Dan Johnson	2 episodes
2001	Touched by an Angel	Walter Harlow	Episode: "Winners, Losers & Leftovers"
2001	Cartoon Cartoon Show	Parrot/Phone Operator	Episode: You Pick 2—"Ferret & Parrot" pilot
2001	Just Shoot Me!	Evan Harrison	Episode: "Sugar Momma"
2001–03	Oswald	Leo, Stagehand, Bus Driver, Gingerbread Man #1	Voice, 22 episodes
2002	Malcolm in the Middle	Tough Guy	Episode: "Monkey"
2002	Justice League	General Hoffman	Voice, episode: "The Savage Time"
2002–04	The Guardian	Mr. Greene, Attorney	4 episodes
2004–05	CSI: NY	Dr. Leonard Giles	5 episodes
2005	All Grown Up!	Red, Rustler #1	Voice, 2 episodes
2005	Yukikaze	Additional Voices	Episode: "Operation 5"
2005–07	My Life as a Teenage Robot	Dr. Locus, Guy #1, Worker #2	Voice, 2 episodes
2006–07	ER	ICU Attending, Ronny Faneca	2 episodes
2007	Higglytown Heroes	Locksmith Hero	Voice, episode: "Unlock the Magic"
2010	Brothers & Sisters	Joe Corvus	2 episodes
2010	Criminal Minds	Gregory Wilson	Episode: "Middle Man"
2010–12	In Plain Sight	A.U.S.A. Tippy Boswell	3 episodes
2012	Rizzoli & Isles	Dr. James Bacal	Episode: "This Is How a Heart Breaks"
2016	Notorious	Donnie	Episode: "Chase"
2017	American Horror Story: Cult	Scott Anderson	Episode: "Holes"

=== Video games ===
Year	Title	Role
2000	Command & Conquer: Red Alert 2	Night Hawk, Soviet Vehicle
2001	Command & Conquer: Yuri's Revenge	Additional Voices
2002	007: Nightfire	Power Plant Guards
2002	Emperor: Battle for Dune	Unit Response
2003	Lionheart	Additional Voices
2003	Lionheart: Legacy of the Crusader	Additional Voices
2003	Robin Hood: Defender of the Crown	Prince John
2003	Call of Duty	Additional Voices
2003	Spawn: Armageddon	Reaver
2004	Onimusha Blade Warriors	Magoichi Saiga
2004	Doom 3	Video Logs, Additional Voices
2004	Call of Duty: United Offensive	Russian Narrator, Additional Voices
2004	Shark Tale	Additional Tenant Fish
2004	EverQuest II	Garvin Tralk, Khalil'Mun, Gavin Ironforge, Trevor Mintern, Jetsam Anchorwash, Master-at-Arms Dagorel, Matthias Siegemaker, War Duke Gesarius, Zhox Selith, Ferri Koude
2004	Vampire: The Masquerade – Bloodlines	Alistair Grout, Ingvar Johansen, Arthur Kilpatrick, Bishop Vick
2004	Metal Gear Solid 3: Snake Eater	The End
2004	The Lord of the Rings: The Battle for Middle-earth	Additional Voices
2005	The Punisher	Crack Dealer, Chop Shop Worker, Yakuza, Fisk Industries Guard
2005	Destroy All Humans!	Crypto, G-Man #1, Urban Crazy, Urban Male
2005	Gun	Federal Marshall, Deputy Bob the Blade
2006	Star Wars: Empire at War	Imperial Officer, Rebel Field Commander, Additional Voices
2006	The Lord of the Rings: The Battle for Middle-earth II	Additional Voices
2006	Onimusha: Dawn of Dreams	Fortinbras
2006	Syphon Filter: Dark Mirror	Additional Voices
2006	The Ant Bully	Stan Beals, Generic Ant
2006	Company of Heroes	Additional Voices
2006	Scooby-Doo! Who's Watching Who?	Earl, Old Man Wiggins, Demon Shark
2006	Destroy All Humans! 2	Crypto
2006	The Sopranos: Road to Respect	Additional Voices
2006	Happy Feet	Eggbert the Elder
2006	The Lord of the Rings: Battle for Middle-earth II, The Rise of the Witch-king	Additional Voices
2007	Spider-Man 3	Additional Voices
2007	Conan	Additional Voices
2007	Enemy Territory: Quake Wars	GDF Player, Additional VO
2007	Bee Movie Game	Additional Voices
2007	No More Heroes	Death Metal
2008	Kung Fu Panda	Additional Voices
2008	Command & Conquer: Red Alert 3	Additional Voices
2008	Destroy All Humans! Path of the Furon	Crypto, Jack Trippleson
2008	Prince of Persia	The Warrior
2009	Brütal Legend	Roadies
2009	Bayonetta	Balder, Iustitia, Additional Voices
2011	Rage	Additional Voices
2011	Star Wars: The Old Republic	Additional Voices
2012	Metal Gear Solid: Snake Eater 3D	The End
2014	Bayonetta 2	Old Balder, Justitia, Additional Voices
2016	World of Warcraft: Legion	Voice role
2025	Metal Gear Solid Delta: Snake Eater	The End (archived audio & new dialogue)

=== Soundtrack ===
- Destroy All Humans! Path of the Furon (2008) - (performer: "You Got Me, Hun")

=== Thanks ===
- CinemAbility: The Art of Inclusion (2018) - (special thanks)

=== Archive Footage ===
- Destroy All Humans (2020) - Crypto (voice)
- Destroy All Humans! 2: Reprobed (2022) - Crypto (voice)
