= Richard Steven Horvitz =

American actor and comedian (born 1966)

- Horvitz at Animate! Philadelphia in 2026
- Born: July 29, 1966 (age 60); Los Angeles, California, U.S.
- Other names: Rico Bonet; Richard Stults; Richard Wood
- Occupations: Actor; comedian; voice director
- Years active: 1976–present
- Spouse: Kristen Lazarian (m. 1996)
- Children: 3
- Relatives: Louis J. Horvitz (brother)
- Website: richardhorvitz.com

Richard Steven Horvitz (Note: Horvitz has occasionally been credited as Rico Bonet, Richard Stults, or Richard Wood.) (born July 29, 1966) is an American actor, comedian and voice director. He is best known for his voice work in animation and video games. His voice credits include the original Alpha 5 on Mighty Morphin Power Rangers, Power Rangers Zeo and Power Rangers Turbo, Razputin Aquato in Psychonauts, Kaos in Skylanders, Billy and his father Harold in Grim & Evil and The Grim Adventures of Billy & Mandy, Grey Matter in Ben 10, Rodney in Squirrel Boy, Daggett in The Angry Beavers, Zim in Invader Zim, Orthopox in Destroy All Humans!, the Zoni in Ratchet & Clank, Bumble in Kinectimals, the Space Weaver in Broken Age, Kanchomé in Zatch Bell!, and Moxxie in Helluva Boss.

== Early life ==
Horvitz was born in Los Angeles, California. His father Louie, a planning engineer for Rocketdyne for over 35 years, was Jewish. His maternal grandfather was born in Cuba, and his mother's family is from Mérida, Mexico. His older brother, Louis J. Horvitz, is a television director and producer. As a child, Horvitz was inspired by Flip Wilson, Tom Jones, and Don Adams, doing impressions of them.

== Career ==
=== Acting ===
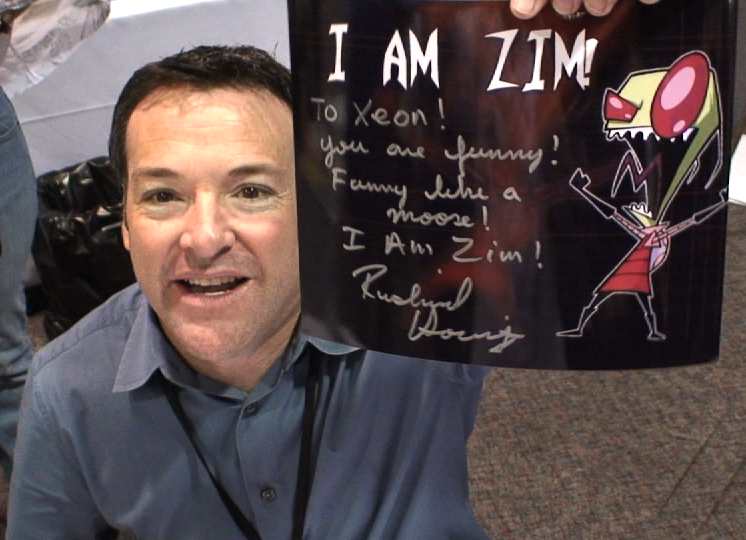
Horvitz with an autographed Invader Zim picture in May 2009

Horvitz first appeared in a 1976 Freshen Up gum commercial, which led to other commercial appearances and several hand modeling jobs. After a brief stint in an off-Broadway production of Oliver!, he went on to make appearances on television series such as Kids Incorporated and Safe at Home, and films such as Summer School, How I Got into College, and Deadly Weapon. From 1988 to 1991, he starred as Howie for two seasons in the syndicated television sitcom The Munsters Today.

=== Voice acting ===
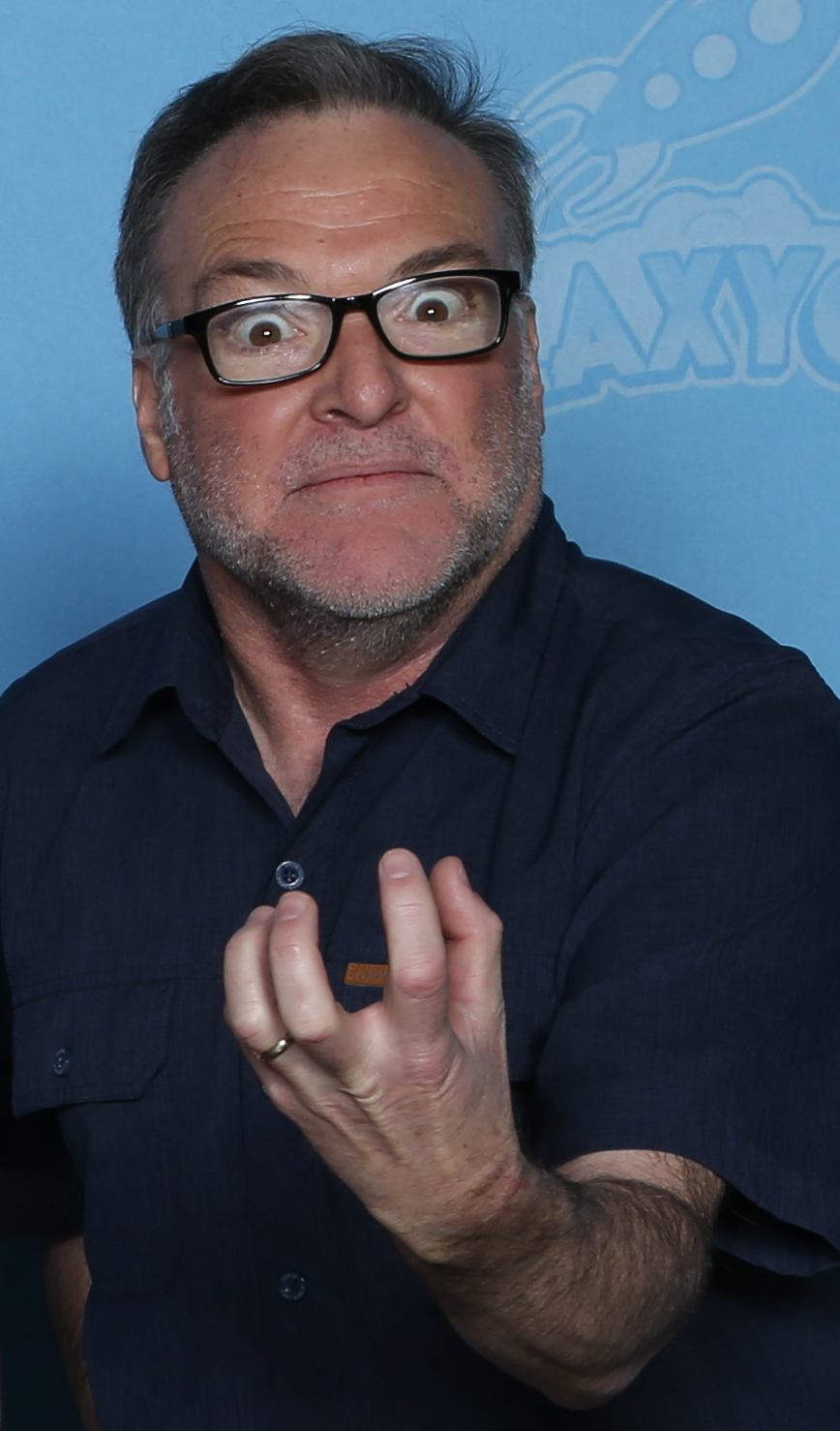
Horvitz in 2020

Starting in 1993, Horvitz changed the focus of his career to voice acting, starting with the voice of Alpha 5 in the live-action series Mighty Morphin Power Rangers. From there, he had several other voice roles in such animated series as The Angry Beavers (as Daggett), Invader Zim (as Zim), Kim Possible (as Aviarius), Dave the Barbarian (as Ned Frischman), Zatch Bell! (as Kanchomé), The Grim Adventures of Billy & Mandy (as Billy and his father Harold), Ben 10 (as Grey Matter), Squirrel Boy (as Rodney), and Shorty McShorts' Shorts (as Dudley). He also co-wrote the Grim Adventures of Billy & Mandy episode "Keeper of the Reaper" alongside his wife Kristen Lazarian.

After his stint as Alpha 5 ended, Horvitz went on to voice a few monsters in other Power Rangers series and was also the voice of Alpha 7 in the Power Rangers Wild Force episode "Forever Red". He voiced the main characters of Raz in the Psychonauts series and Orthopox in the Destroy All Humans! series. He has also voiced various NPCs in EverQuest II, the Berserker Darklings in The Darkness, Bumble in Kinectimals, and Kaos in Skylanders: Spyro's Adventure.

Horvitz voiced Green Grapes in the Fruit of the Loom commercials and has acted on stage, including in Jeffrey Hatcher's Mrs. Mannerly.

Horvitz also voices Moxxie and serves as a voice director in the adult animated web series Helluva Boss. He also played the roles of Alpha 8 and Alpha 9 in the Netflix special Mighty Morphin Power Rangers: Once & Always, which celebrated the 30th anniversary of the Power Rangers franchise.

Horvitz speaks fluent Spanish, though he has stated he does not perform Spanish-language voice work.

=== Comedy ===
In 2001, Horvitz was in the sketch comedy group The MoHos with Fred Willard, created by Willard's wife Mary Lovell. He and Willard would sometimes perform on various talk shows including Jimmy Kimmel Live! and The Tonight Show with Jay Leno. Horvitz also appeared in an episode of Saturday Night Live in the short segment "Bear City" and briefly appeared on Tosh.0.

== Personal life ==
Horvitz married playwright and screenwriter Kristen Lazarian on February 9, 1996. They currently live in Los Angeles and have three sons.

== Filmography ==
=== Film ===
Year	Title	Role	Notes
1987	Summer School	Alan Eakian	
1989	Deadly Weapon	Lester	
1989	How I Got into College	Young Enterpriser	
1995	Mighty Morphin Power Rangers: The Movie	Alpha 5 (voice)	Credited as "Richard Wood"
1996	The Hunchback of Notre Dame	Claude Frollo's Guard (voice)	
1997	Turbo: A Power Rangers Movie	Alpha 5 (voice)	Theatrical film
1998	Sabrina Goes to Rome	Stonehenge (voice)	Television film
1998	Mulan	Chinese Soldier (voice)	
1999	Storm	Danny	
2001	Osmosis Jones	Male Red Blood Cell (voice)	
2001	Shaolin Soccer	Cheating Team Captain	English dub
2005	Son of the Mask	Masked Otis (voice)	
2007	Billy & Mandy's Big Boogey Adventure	Billy, Billybot, Harold, Pale Ghoul Juror, Chippy (voice)	Television film
2007	Ben 10: Secret of the Omnitrix	Grey Matter, Stinkfly (voice)	Television film
2008	Underfist: Halloween Bash	Billy, Harold, Pumpkin (voice)	Television film
2009	The Informant!	Bob Zaideman	
2011	Crazy, Stupid, Love	Hardware Store Assistant	
2012	Ben 10: Destroy All Aliens	Grey Matter, Police Radio (voice)	Television film
2013	I Know That Voice	Himself	Documentary
2013	Saving Santa	Chestnut, Orange-Haired Elf (voice)	
2014	Legends of Oz: Dorothy's Return	Munchkin Suitor (voice)	
2019	Invader Zim: Enter the Florpus	Invader Zim (voice)	
2020	The SpongeBob Movie: Sponge on the Run	Additional voices	
2021	Seal Team	Snap (voice)	
2023	Mighty Morphin Power Rangers: Once & Always	Alpha 8, Alpha 9 (voice)	Television film

=== Television ===
Year	Title	Role	Notes
1988	Head of the Class	Oswald Bletch	Episode: "Don't Play with Matches"
1989	The Munsters Today	Howie Buchanan	2 episodes
1993–1999	Mighty Morphin Power Rangers	Alpha 5 (voice)	156 episodes
1996	Power Rangers Zeo	Alpha 5 (voice)	50 episodes
1997	Power Rangers Turbo	Alpha 5 (voice)	Episode: "Shift Into Turbo"
1997	Babylon 5	Mark	Episode: "Conflicts of Interest"
1997	I Am Weasel	Beaver, Owl (voice)	Episode: "I Am Ambassador"
1997	Sabrina the Teenage Witch	Smaller Chair (voice)	Episode: "A River of Candy Corn Runs Through It"
1997, 2004	Johnny Bravo	Dr. Pencilneck, Guard with Shades, Bag Boy, Ticket Taker (voice)	2 episodes
1997–1998	Working	Craig, Elevator Passenger	2 episodes
1997–2001	The Angry Beavers	Daggett Beaver (voice)	Main role
2000	Power Rangers Lightspeed Rescue	Smogger (voice)	Episode: "Up to the Challenge"
2001	Power Rangers Time Force	Mantamobile (voice)	Episode: "A Blue Streak"
2001	As Told by Ginger	Mitchey Mekelburg (voice)	Episode: "The Even Steven Holiday Special"
2001–2007	The Grim Adventures of Billy & Mandy	Billy, Harold (voice)	Main role
2001–2003	Invader Zim	Invader Zim, various characters (voice)	Main role
2002	Static Shock	Jimmy Osgood (voice)	Episode: "Jimmy"
2002	Power Rangers Wild Force	Alpha 7 (voice)	Episode: "Forever Red"
2002	Rugrats	Manager, Ketchup Man, Announcer (voice)	2 episodes
2004–2005	Dave the Barbarian	Ned Frischman, Guard, Tarantula (voice)	2 episodes
2004	The Fairly OddParents	Chuck (voice)	Episode: "Crash Nebula"
2004	Kim Possible	Aviarius (voice)	Episode: "Go Team Go"
2006	That's So Raven	Teddy	Episode: "Adventures in Boss Sitting"
2006	Shorty McShorts' Shorts	Dudley, Guard (voice)	Episode: "Dudley and Nestor Do Nothing"
2006–2008	Ben 10	Grey Matter, Sublimino, various (voice)	17 episodes
2006–2008	Squirrel Boy	Rodney (voice)	Main role
2007	Codename: Kids Next Door	Oliver (voice)	Episode: “Operation: C.R.I.M.E.”
2007–2008	El Tigre: The Adventures of Manny Rivera	Dr. Chipotle (voice)	6 episodes
2009	Tosh.0	Fred Willard Fan	Episode: "New Pukes Kid"
2011	Fish Hooks	Ninja Fish (voice)	Episode: "Milo Gets a Ninja"
2016	New Looney Tunes	Impkin the Pumpkin King (voice)	Supporting role
2016	Shimmer and Shine	Gobi (voice)	Episode: "The Glob"
2016–2018	Skylanders Academy	Kaos (voice)	Main role
2017	Billy Dilley's Super-Duper Subterranean Summer	Yucky (voice)	3 episodes
2017–present	The Loud House	Various characters (voice)	
2017–2018	Bunnicula	Lugosi (voice)	3 episodes
2018	Mighty Magiswords	Ghosthopper, Kricket Knight (voice)	Episode: "Ghosthaste"
2018	The Adventures of Kid Danger	Larvin, Various voices (voice)	5 episodes
2018	Elena of Avalor	Ocho (voice)	3 episodes
2018	Rapunzel's Tangled Adventure	Jorn, Borb, Lorbs (voice)	3 episodes
2019	Dragon Ball Super	Dr. Rota (voice)	Episode: "Death Match with an Invisible Attacker!"
2019–2021	Power Players	Dr. Nautilus (voice)	
2024	Love on the Spectrum	Himself	Episode: "2.5"
2025	Jellystone!	Billy, Harold, Rodney (voice)	Episode: "Crisis on Infinite Mirths"
2025–present	Hazbin Hotel	Minor character	also voice director

=== Web series ===
Year	Title	Role	Notes
2019	Camp Camp	Xemüg (voice)	Episode: "Camp Loser Says What?"; Credited as Rico Bonet
2019–present	Helluva Boss	Moxxie, Crimson (voice)	Main role; also voice director
2023	Grandpa	Moxxie (voice), Officer Horvitz	Episode: "Blitzø vs. Grandpa"
2024	Class Acts	Interviewer from Hell	Episode: "The Ending Could Ruin Everything"

=== Video games ===
Year	Title	Role	Notes
1998	Popeye & The Sunken Treasure	Sea Hag	
2005	Red Ninja: End of Honor	Takeda Katsuyori	English Version, Credited as Richard Horvitz
2005	Ape Escape: On the Loose	Spike	U.S. Version
2005	Psychonauts	Raz Aquato	
2005	Destroy All Humans!	Orthopox, Suburban Crazy	
2006	Neopets: Petpet Adventures: The Wand of Wishing	Mad Whoot	
2006	The Grim Adventures of Billy & Mandy	Billy, Mogar	
2006	Destroy All Humans! 2	Pox	
2007	The Darkness	Berserker Darkling	
2007	Ratchet & Clank Future: Tools of Destruction	Zoni	
2008	Metal Gear Solid 4: Guns of the Patriots	Enemy Soldiers	English Version
2008	Crash: Mind Over Mutant	Bratgirl	
2008	SpongeBob SquarePants Featuring Nicktoons: Globs of Doom	Invader Zim	
2008	Destroy All Humans! Path of the Furon	Pox	
2009	Brütal Legend	Jack the Lift Op, Kabbage Boy Guitarist	
2009	Ratchet & Clank Future: A Crack in Time	Pollyx, Zoni	
2009	FusionFall	Billy	
2010	Kinectimals	Bumble	
2011	PlayStation Move Heroes	Lunk, Zoni	
2011	Nicktoons MLB	Invader Zim	
2011	Skylanders: Spyro's Adventure	Kaos	
2011	Ratchet & Clank: All 4 One	Nevo Dinklemeyer	
2011	Cartoon Network: Punch Time Explosion	Billy	Grouped under "Featuring the Voice Talents Of"
2012	Ratchet & Clank: Full Frontal Assault	Stuart Zurgo	
2012	Skylanders: Giants	Kaos	
2013	Ratchet & Clank: Into the Nexus	Pollyx	
2013	Skylanders: Swap Force	Kaos	
2014	Broken Age	Walt'r, Space Weaver	
2014	Skylanders: Trap Team	Kaos	
2015	Skylanders: SuperChargers	Kaos	
2016	Ratchet & Clank	Brain Scientist, Mayor Buckwash, Hoverboarder #2	
2016	Skylanders: Imaginators	Kaos	
2017	Psychonauts in the Rhombus of Ruin	Raz Aquato	
2020	Crash Bandicoot 4: It's About Time	Lani-Loli	
2021	Ratchet & Clank: Rift Apart	Zurkon Jr.	
2021	Psychonauts 2	Raz Aquato	
2021	Nickelodeon All-Star Brawl	Invader Zim	
2022	Nickelodeon Kart Racers 3: Slime Speedway	Invader Zim	
2023	Star Wars Jedi: Survivor	Turgle	
2023	Nickelodeon All-Star Brawl 2	Invader Zim, Daggett Beaver	
2025	Dragon Ball Legends	Chilled	
2026	Dragon Ball: Sparking! Zero	Chilled	
2026	Nicktoons & The Dice of Destiny	Invader Zim	DLC

=== Audiobooks ===
- Goosebumps: Attack of the Mutant – Skipper Matthews

=== Theme park attractions ===
- Tower of Terror (Tokyo DisneySea) – Shiriki Utundu
- The Twilight Zone Tower Of Terror (Walt Disney Studios) – Shaft Creatures

== Awards and nominations ==
- Nominated – Annie Award for Outstanding Individual Achievement for Voice Acting by a Male Performer in an Animated Television Production for Invader Zim – 2001
- Nominated – Annie Award for Best Voice Acting in an Animated Feature Production for Invader Zim: Enter the Florpus – 2020
