= Voyeur II =

1996 video game

- Developer: InterWeave Entertainment
- Publisher: Philips Media
- Director: Robert Weaver
- Producer: Carrie Buse
- Designer: Rick Weaver
- Writers: Heidi Sorenson; Robert Weaver
- Composer: Garry Schyman
- Platforms: MS-DOS, Windows 3.1, Macintosh, CD-i
- Release: July 1996
- Genre: Full Motion Video
- Mode: Single player

Voyeur II is a first person full-motion video game released in July 1996 by Philips Media and Interweave Entertainment, starring Jennifer O'Neill. The game is a sequel to Voyeur, released in 1993.

== Plot ==
This time, hidden cameras were placed on an isolated mountain cabin where various people have gathered for the reading of a will that is expected to give Dr. Elizabeth Duran control of a lucrative research institute. All of the cabin guests want control of the institute, and the player's goals are to prevent the murder of Dr. Duran, expose Everett's killer, and obtain evidence justifying the player's actions to Sheriff Parker.

== Cast ==
- Jennifer O'Neill - Dr. Elizabeth Duran
- David Groh - Sylvio Donato
- Mathew Flint - Peter Cussler
- Karen Mayo-Chandler - Rachel Cussler
- Devin Spirtas - Colin
- Kari Whitman - Candace
- William Paul Burns - Dr. Everett Cussler
- Dennis Weaver - Sheriff John Parker

== Gameplay ==
Style of play is similar to Voyeur and Night Trap. The game cannot be saved, being played through continuously, and is intended to be replayed with new decisions to achieve different endings.

== Reception ==
Reception for this game was positive. Critics liked the fast action and that players are always kept on their toes.
