= POTF =

POTF may refer to:

- Phil of the Future, an American comedy children's television series
- Poets of the Fall, an independent rock band from Finland
- Destroy All Humans! Path of the Furon, the fourth Destroy All Humans! game
