= Darryl Kurylo =

American voice actor (born 1965)

- Born: November 17, 1965 (age 61); East Lansing, Michigan, U.S.
- Occupation: Voice actor
- Years active: 2000–present

Darryl Hughes Kurylo (born November 17, 1965) is an American voice actor. He is best known for being the voice of Kazuma Kiryu, the protagonist of the Yakuza video game series in the English versions of the game circa 2005 to 2020, as well as Asher Mir in the 2017 video game Destiny 2.

== Career ==
Kurylo began his voice acting career in 2000. One of his earliest roles was voicing several characters in the video game, Escape from Monkey Island.

In 2005 he voiced characters in the game, The Punisher. He has also voiced characters in Call of Duty: Modern Warfare 3 (2011), World of Warcraft: Warlords of Draenor (2014), Prototype 2, Guild Wars 2 and Diablo III, all released in 2012. He has recurring voice acting roles in Destroy All Humans! and Company of Heroes.

Kurylo has also helped narrate dozens of textbooks and works of fiction for Audible books and as a volunteer for Reading for the Blind & Dyslexic.

== Filmography ==
=== Television ===
- The Cartoon Cartoon Show (voice) (2000)
- God, the Devil and Bob (voice) (2001)
- Totally Spies! (voice) (2003–2004)
- Stroker and Hoop (voice) (2005)

=== Video games ===
- Escape from Monkey Island (2000) – Admiral Casaba, Monkey 3, Pirate 3
- Toy Story Racer (2001) – Slinky Dog
- Rocket Power: Beach Bandits (2003) – Eric Golem, Sr., Drill Sergeant, Town Official, Shop Assistant
- The Punisher (2005) – The Russian, John Saint/Jigsaw
- Kingdom of Paradise (2005) – Soh Yu / Captain
- Yakuza (2005) – Kazuma Kiryu
- The Lord of the Rings: The Battle for Middle-earth II (2006) – Glorfindel
- Guild Wars Factions (2006) – Master Togo
- Titan Quest (2006) – Xi Kang, Polymedes, Hylas
- Company of Heroes (2006) – Schultz
- Open Season (2006) – Shaw, Beaver 2, Duck 2
- Tony Hawk's Project 8 (2006) – Eddie X, The Colonel
- The Lord of the Rings: The Battle for Middle-earth II: The Rise of the Witch-king (2006) – Glorfindel
- Armored Core 4 (2006) – Joshua O'Brien
- Company of Heroes: Opposing Fronts (2007) – Additional voices
- Neverwinter Nights 2: Mask of the Betrayer (2007) – Okku
- Crash of the Titans (2007) – Voodoo Bunny
- Power Rangers: Super Legends (2007) – Operation Overdrive Black Ranger, S.P.D. Shadow Ranger
- Destroy All Humans! Big Willy Unleashed (2008) – Orthopox
- Lost: Via Domus (2008) – Sayid Hassan Jarrah
- Speed Racer: The Videogame (2008) – Prince Kabala, Pitter Pat
- Hellboy: The Science of Evil (2008) – Additional voices
- Destroy All Humans! Path of the Furon (2008) – The Master
- Ninja Blade (2009) – Kanbé Ogawa
- Resistance: Retribution (2009) – Cloven 1
- Company of Heroes: Tales of Valor (2009) – Bormann, Schwimmwagen, Panzer IV
- Terminator Salvation (2009) – Peters
- Brütal Legend (2009) – Sonbat, Headbangers, Bouncers
- White Knight Chronicles II (2010) – Yggdra
- Skylanders: Spyro's Adventure (2011) – Various
- Call of Duty: Modern Warfare 3 (2011) – Russian Soldier, Various
- Prototype 2 (2012) – Alex Mercer
- Diablo III (2012) – Belial, additional voices
- Guild Wars 2 (2012) – Agravaine, Kagula, Tonka
- Saints Row 4 (2013) – The Dom
- Transformers: Devastation (2015) – Shockwave, Ground Soldier 2, Insecticon 1
- Destiny 2 (2017) – Asher Mir
- Yakuza: Like a Dragon (2020) – Kazuma Kiryu
- Mullet MadJack (2024) – Jack
