= Fade to Silence =

2019 video game

- Developer: Black Forest Games
- Publisher: THQ Nordic
- Director: Jean-Marc Haessig
- Producers: Christian Krüger; Dennis Schiefer
- Designer: David Sallmann
- Programmer: Johannes Conradie
- Writers: Hans-Jörg Knabel; Elena Riesen; Maria Clevy
- Composers: Alex Pfeffer; Alya (Aleksandra) Maghakyna; Chris Hülsbeck; Dominik Morgenroth; Felix Diekhake
- Engine: Unreal Engine 4
- Platforms: Microsoft Windows; PlayStation 4 Xbox One
- Release: 30 April 2019
- Genres: Action-adventure, survival
- Mode: Single-player

Fade to Silence is a 2019 action-adventure survival game developed by Black Forest Games and published by THQ Nordic. The game entered Steam Early Access in December 2017 and was released for PlayStation 4, Windows, and Xbox One in April 2019. It received mixed reviews from critics.

== Gameplay ==
Players take control of protagonist character Ash, who is described as a "natural leader" tasked with facing "eldritch monsters and the elements in a post-apocalyptic environment blanketed in endless winter." Fade to Silence will allow the players to "construct, upgrade and defend" their refuges, as well as rescue and recruit followers, combating monsters and exploring a 10 km squared snowy hellscape. The game also offers the option to focus on building and defending a refuge in a bleak, monster-strewn open world.

== Development and release ==
Fade to Silence was announced at The Game Awards in December 2017. The game entered early access on 14 December 2017, where it was marketed as a survival game set in a snow-covered forest, requiring the player to collect resources, build a refuge, and recruit others as followers to survive. The plan initially aimed for a full release in August 2018. The game was released for PlayStation 4, Windows, and Xbox One on 30 April 2019, alongside new content including the full version of the game's story.

== Reception ==
Reception

Aggregate score
| Aggregator | Score |
|---|---|
| Metacritic | 57/100 (PC); 55/100 (PS4); 57/100 (XONE) |

Fade to Silence received "mixed or average" reviews from critics, according to review aggregator website Metacritic. Writing for PC Invasion, Jason Rodriguez praised the "stunning" visuals, but noted problems caused by bugs and glitches present in the PC version. Liam Croft of Push Square said the story was "ludicrously lacking", but commented that the experience was enhanced by "extensive survival procedures", describing the mechanic of managing body temperature as "impressively dangerous". Both reviews are critical of the game's combat, with Rodriguez saying it "becomes rote and bland".
