= Teenage Mutant Ninja Turtles: The Last Ronin =

2020s comic book

- Cover of Teenage Mutant Ninja Turtles: The Last Ronin #1

Publication information
- Publisher: IDW Publishing
- Format: Limited series
- Genre: Superhero
- Publication date: October 2020 – April 2022
- No. of issues: 5
- Main character: Michelangelo

Creative team
- Written by: Kevin Eastman (story, script); Peter Laird (story); Tom Waltz (script)
- Artists: Esau Escorza; Isaac Escorza; Ben Bishop; Kevin Eastman
- Letterer: Shawn Lee
- Colorist: Luis Antonio Delgado
- Editors: Bobby Curnow; R. G. Llarena

Teenage Mutant Ninja Turtles: The Last Ronin is a five-issue comic book miniseries published by IDW Publishing between October 2020 and April 2022. The series was written by Kevin Eastman and Tom Waltz, based on a story conceived by Eastman and Peter Laird, with art contributions from Esau and Isaac Escorza, Ben Bishop, and Eastman.

The story follows characters from the Teenage Mutant Ninja Turtles franchise in an alternative future, wherein the last remaining turtle seeks to avenge the death of his brothers by killing the grandson of one of the Turtles' arch-enemies, the Shredder. Despite being published by IDW, it is unconnected to the IDW series' continuity and is set in its own universe, dubbed the "Roninverse". The story was based on an old story outline written by Eastman and Laird in 1987, before the former updated it with Tom Waltz.

The Last Ronin was both a critical and commercial success, earning widespread acclaim for its darker tone, narrative, central character arc, and use of varying art styles. It was followed by Teenage Mutant Ninja Turtles: The Last Ronin - Lost Years and Teenage Mutant Ninja Turtles: The Last Ronin II - Re-Evolution in 2023 and 2024. A video game adaptation is in development. A novelization was published on June 2, 2026.

== Plot ==
In the future, NYC is ruled by Oroku Hiroto, grandson of the Shredder and son of Karai, who runs the city with meticulous fascist totalitarianism. A lone turtle, haunted by hallucinations of his deceased brothers, works to end Hiroto, whom he blames for his brothers' deaths. He traverses through the now heavily guarded NYC, fighting against synthetic ninjas (dubbed Synjas) on his way to the Foot Clan headquarters. He crashes out of the building, having failed his mission, and retreats into the sewer as a teenage girl called Jones follows. She finds the turtle attempting seppuku before passing out from blood loss, and wakes up to see an older April O'Neil, who identifies the turtle as Michelangelo.

Flashback sequences in sepia and in the style of the original Mirage comics reveal the events leading up to the present. After Shredder's death, the Turtles and the Foot Clan initially made a truce, but it fell apart when Karai tried to end the conflict between their families once and for all. An ambush leaves Splinter severely injured, and an enraged Raphael confronts Karai in an attempt to kill her, but Raphael is stabbed in the neck, and Karai is put in a coma from the fight. Baxter H. Stockman sends an ambush to retrieve Professor Honeycutt, which kills Leonardo and Casey Jones, and a deceitful peace meeting set up by the Foot Clan has Donatello and Splinter killed as well. Mikey left NYC and lived in solitude for years, accompanied by Splinter's journal, but a fight with a gang makes him realize that it is his duty as the final remaining member of the Hamato family, the Ronin, to kill Hiroto.

Mikey catches up with April and meets her daughter, Casey Marie Jones, who is part of a small resistance movement and is training herself to fight the Foot Clan. As Mikey grapples with his feelings on the resistance movement, Casey Marie's inexperience, as well as his advancing mutation, Hiroto puts the entire city under Martial Law in order to wrestle more control over it, which forces Casey Marie to gather resistance forces to stage an assault on Baxter Stockman's Fortress to disable the technology used by the Foot Clan. April, Casey Marie, and Mikey retrieve Professor Honeycutt's remains to kill Stockman and trigger a power outage throughout the city.

The power outage causes a flood in the sewers, threatening to drown the resistance members and April. April reveals to Casey Marie that Casey is a mutant because of the former's prolonged exposure to the mutagen in the turtles. While Casey Marie tries to stop the flooding and rescue her mother, Mikey confronts Hiroto, who kills Karai and is now equipped with a special metal suit, and they both engage in a battle. They both land in the city outskirts, where Hiroto electrocutes himself and mortally injures Mikey, prompting Casey Marie and April to bid him farewell as he dies. As Mikey reunites with his brothers, Casey Jones, and Splinter in the afterlife, Casey Marie begins raising a new generation of mutant turtles to train them in the ways of ninjitsu.

== Development ==
In December 2019, it was teased that a new Teenage Mutant Ninja Turtles project, dubbed The Last Ronin, would begin publication in mid-2020. In April 2020, the series was formally announced, with Kevin Eastman revealing that the plot was based on an old story outline written by Peter Laird and himself back in 1987, before he updated it with Tom Waltz. While Laird did not write the series, he is credited with the story behind it, along with Eastman and Waltz. Andy Kuhn was set to be the original artist for the series, before being replaced with Esau and Isaac Escorza, with Ben Bishop joining the project to illustrate the flashback sequences.

The decision to make Michelangelo the last of the surviving turtles was made by Eastman and Waltz. When asked why Michelangelo was chosen by the writers, Waltz stated:

The simplest answer is that Mikey was the brother we figured nobody would expect. The happy-go-lucky party dude is now Rambo? What?! Raph seemed too obvious, Leo wasn't too far behind on the obvious scale, and Donnie seemed like someone who would've gone more tech than conventional in his revenge, and we really wanted this to be a grunt's story. [...] Plus, Kevin really liked the idea that Mikey, who was the first TMNT ever drawn, was also the last to be alive. Thematically, Mikey gave us the opportunity to explore the irony of the one person in the family who never truly bought into the clan-war aspect that exists at the foundation of their lives – being the only one left alive and stuck with the mission of ultimately winning said war, or dying trying.

== Release and reception ==
Upon its release in October 2020, Teenage Mutant Ninja Turtles: The Last Ronin quickly became a popular title. The initial 60,000-unit print run of the hardcover collection sold out within the first six weeks of release and landed on the New York Times best-seller list. ICv2 calculated that the collection was the second best selling adult graphic novel of 2023 and the best selling graphic novel of 2024. Notably for 2023, it was the only non-manga title to make ICv2's list.

According to ComicBookRoundup.com, Teenage Mutant Ninja Turtles: The Last Ronin received an average rating of 8.9 out of 10 based on 61 reviews. Rory Wilding of AIPT gave the miniseries a 9.5 out of 10 rating. Favorably comparing it to Frank Miller's 1986 book, The Dark Knight Returns, he praised the variety of art styles, dystopian take on the Turtles mythos, and the initial mystery and journey of the titular ronin. In a review of the hardcover release, Gregg Katzman of CBR similarly praised the range of styles, in addition to the lettering, action, coloring, and heartfelt story. Reviewing the first issue, Evan Mullicane of Screen Rant commended the miniseries for its sense of mystery and intrigue, handling of its serious tone, and art style. Reviewing the fifth and final issue, Grant DeArmitt of GamesRadar+ praised Michelangelo's arc, the pacing and lettering, and Ben Bishop and Esau and Isaac Escorza's art contributions. Criticism was directed towards the inconsistency of the main villain, Oroku Hiroto.

== Follow-ups ==
The continuity of Teenage Mutant Ninja Turtles: The Last Ronin and its follow-up projects has been officially dubbed the "Roninverse".

In July 2022, it was announced that a prequel/sequel, Teenage Mutant Ninja Turtles: The Last Ronin - Lost Years would release in 2023, and follow Michelangelo's training leading up to his confrontation with Hiroto interspliced with Casey Marie Jones mentoring the next generation of Turtles (Odyn, Moja, Uno, and Yi). Eastman and Waltz returned to write, with S.L. Gallant serving as the primary illustrator and Ben Bishop drawing the flashforwards with Casey Marie. The series consisted of five issues and began publication in January 2023, later concluding in August that same year.

In July 2023, a sequel was announced, Teenage Mutant Ninja Turtles: The Last Ronin II - Re-Evolution, which follows the events of The Last Ronin and The Lost Years as Odyn, Moja, Uno, and Yi protect the streets of New York with their sensei, Casey Marie Jones. Eastman and Waltz return as writers, along with the Escorza brothers and Ben Bishop drawing the series. The series consisted of five issues and began publication in March 2024, later concluding in April 2025.

In February 2026, it was announced that a prequel one-shot would be released in July that same year entitled The Last Ronin - Training Day. Eastman and Waltz return as writers, along with the Escorza brothers and Ben Bishop drawing, with the one-shot taking place between issues 3 and 4 of the original The Last Ronin miniseries as Michelangelo trains Casey Marie over a 24-hour period.

In July 2026, it was announced that the third main and final installment in the saga, Teenage Mutant Ninja Turtles: The Last Ronin III — Return for New York was set to launch in 2027. Following upon the events of Re-Evolution, the story sees Casey Marie Jones, as well as Odyn, Moja, Uno, and Yi face off against the re-emerged Foot Clan, in a final bid to save New York City. Eastman and Waltz return as writers, along with the Escorza brothers and Ben Bishop drawing.

== Adaptations ==
=== Novelization ===
In February 2026, it was announced that a novelization of the events of the comic aimed at adults would be published by Abram Books. Titled, The Last Ronin: A Teenage Mutant Ninja Turtles Novel, it was written by long-time Turtles comics writer Erik Burnham with Esau and Isaac Escorza returning from the comic to provide artwork. It was released on June 2, 2026.

=== Video game ===
A third-person action-RPG video game adaptation of The Last Ronin was originally announced back in 2023 to be in development by Black Forest Games and was to be published by Embracer Group under its THQ Nordic banner. However, following its announcement and several years of no new updates, it came to light that the project was quietly cancelled when a new version was announced in 2026 to be in development by PlatinumGames, with Paramount Games Studio set to publish it for PlayStation 5, Xbox Series X/S, and Windows.

=== Scrapped film ===
A film adaptation of the graphic novel was announced to be in development by Paramount Pictures in April 2024. The film, produced by Walter Hamada and written by Tyler Burton Smith, was to receive an R-rating and be live-action. In August 2025, the film was reaffirmed to be moving forward following the merger between Paramount Global and Skydance Media. However, in November 2025, it was reported that development on the film was put on hold as Paramount Skydance appointed Neal H. Moritz to oversee a new live-action reboot of the series. Ilya Naishuller was in talks to direct prior to this.
