= Voyeur (video game) =

1993 video game

- Developer: Philips POV Entertainment
- Publishers: Philips Interactive (CD-i); Interplay (MS-DOS); MacPlay (Mac)
- Director: Robert Weaver
- Designer: David Riordan
- Composer: Garry Schyman
- Platforms: CD-i, MS-DOS, Macintosh
- Release: 1993: CD-i; 1994: Mac; December 2, 1994 (DOS)
- Genre: Interactive movie
- Mode: Single-player

Voyeur is an interactive movie video game released in 1993 for the Philips CD-i. It was ported to MS-DOS compatible operating systems and Macintosh. A major selling point for the game was the "mature" content of the full-motion video sequences, with a number of simulated sex scenes.

A sequel was released for MS-DOS and Macintosh, Voyeur II, and a finished beta version of the sequel for Philips CD-i has been discovered.

== Plot ==
The player takes on the role of a private investigator hired by a member of the wealthy Hawke family in order to gain enough evidence to bring down the corrupt Reed Hawke (played by Robert Culp), CEO of Hawke Industries. Hawke has gathered his family together for the weekend to prepare for his announcement that he will be running for President of the United States. The player controls a video camera located in a building opposite to spy on the Hawke family home in an effort to gather enough evidence to destroy Reed Hawke's career. The player character's client is randomly selected each time a new game is started, and the storyline also changes according to the player's actions.

== Development ==
The game cost $750,000 to produce.

== Reception ==
Reception

Review scores
Publication	Score
Next Generation	3/5
CD-i	95%
Power Unlimited	74%(CD-i)

Voyeur was featured in the cover story of Time's September 27, 1993, issue.

Reviewing the Macintosh version, a Next Generation critic remarked derisively on the limited interactivity of full motion video based games, but said that Voyeur is a superior game by the standards of its genre due to the solid acting. He gave it two out of five stars.

Next Generation reviewed the CD-i version of the game, rating it three stars out of five, and stated that "Although it won't appeal to action fans, this title has enough depth and replay value to be a valuable addition to any CD-i library." Power Unlimited reviewed the cd-i version summarizing: "Voyeur sounds more interesting than it really is. While the game does not go further than a single vague suggestion. The game is mainly a rather tragic B-nonsense soap opera."
