= Yakuza: Like a Dragon =

2020 video game

- International cover art
- Developer: Ryu Ga Gotoku Studio
- Publisher: Sega
- Director: Ryosuke Horii
- Producers: Masayoshi Yokoyama; Hiroyuki Sakamoto
- Programmer: Koji Tokieda
- Artist: Nobuaki Mitake
- Writer: Masayoshi Yokoyama
- Composers: Hidenori Shoji; Yuri Fukuda; Chihiro Aoki; Saori Yoshida
- Series: Yakuza
- Platforms: PlayStation 4; Windows; Xbox One; Xbox Series X/S; PlayStation 5
- Release: PlayStation 4: JP: January 16, 2020; WW: November 10, 2020; Windows, XOne, XSX/S: WW: November 10, 2020; JP: February 25, 2021; PlayStation 5: WW: March 2, 2021; Luna: US: December 10, 2021
- Genre: Role-playing
- Mode: Single-player

Yakuza: Like a Dragon (Note: 龍が如く7 光と闇の行方, Ryū ga Gotoku Sebun: Hikari to Yami no Yukue; lit. "Like a Dragon 7: Whereabouts of Light and Darkness") is a 2020 role-playing video game developed by Ryu Ga Gotoku Studio and published by Sega for the PlayStation 4. The eighth mainline installment in the Yakuza series and the first to be developed as a turn-based RPG, it was released in Japan and Asia on January 16, 2020. The western release of the game for the PlayStation 4, Windows, Xbox One, and Xbox Series X/S on November 10, 2020 included new costumes, the returning of English audio track for the first time since the first game, and some previously paid DLC. This version was then released in Japan and Asia under the subtitle International (Note: Japanese: 龍が如く7 光と闇の行方 インターナショナル, Hepburn: Ryū ga Gotoku Sebun: Hikari to Yami no Yukue International; Ryū ga Gotoku Sebun: Hikari to Yami no Yukue Intānashonaru "Like a Dragon 7: Whereabouts of Light and Darkness International") on February 25, 2021 for Windows and Xbox platforms. The game was released worldwide for the PlayStation 5 on March 2, 2021, and a version for Amazon Luna launched on December 10, 2021.

In contrast to previous Yakuza games that focused on the life of Kazuma Kiryu, a man trying to lead a normal life after leaving the yakuza lifestyle, Like a Dragon instead introduces a new protagonist named Ichiban Kasuga. After being imprisoned for 18 years only to then be betrayed by his former boss, Kasuga goes on a personal quest to become a "hero" and uncover the reason for his betrayal alongside his companions. Yakuza: Like a Dragon received positive reviews from both players and critics who praised the narrative, characters, gameplay, unique take on the JRPG sub-genre, and presentation.

Yakuza: Like a Dragon is the first to use the Japanese title worldwide, albeit as a subtitle. The game was followed up by a 2023 spin-off, Like a Dragon Gaiden: The Man Who Erased His Name, and a mainline sequel, Like a Dragon: Infinite Wealth, in 2024.

== Gameplay ==
A turn-based fight in the game. Here, a party member fights an enemy using the Enforcer Job.

In Yakuza: Like a Dragon, a major departure from previous Yakuza games is the battle system. Instead of the real-time action beat 'em up mechanics of previous games, Yakuza: Like a Dragon features a real-time turn-based role-playing combat system, with up to four party members. During combat, characters may use nearby surrounding items such as bicycles to attack enemies, or may kick certain environmental objects to their target if there is one on the way to the enemy, a mechanic returning from the previous Yakuza games. Players can also call on various party assists to strengthen the party or defeat enemies, with additional assists unlocked through story progress or through the completion of various sidequests. The game world can still be explored after completing the game. A new game plus mode with additional difficulty settings exclusive to this mode was released as paid downloadable content for the Japanese version of the game, but is included at no additional cost in the Western release.

Party members can be customized with Jobs, a form of character classes similar to other RPGs. Different jobs have unique abilities, equipment, and statistics, and each party member has at least one exclusive job. Two jobs can only be obtained via paid downloadable content.

Similar to previous games in the Yakuza series, side-quests (known as sub-stories in-game) can be taken up by the player to gain additional rewards and players are also able to enjoy the various side activities around the map such as karaoke. A new side-activity introduced in this game is Dragon Kart, which is similar to other kart racing games in terms of its gameplay.

== Synopsis ==
=== Setting and characters ===
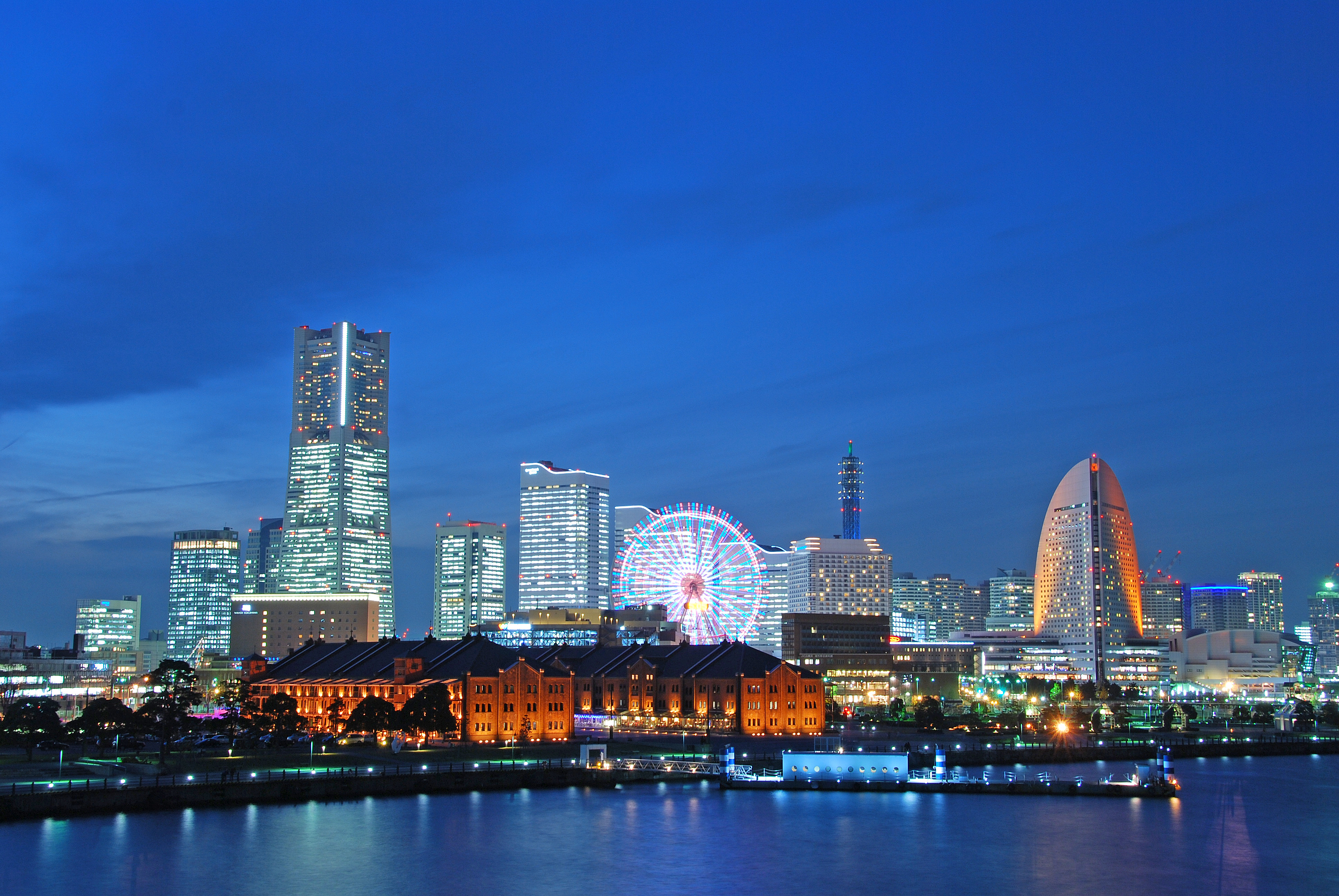
Yokohama, the setting of the game

Yakuza: Like a Dragon is set in 2019, three years after the events of Yakuza 6: The Song of Life. For the first time in the Yakuza series, the focus shifts away from Tokyo and the game's fictional recreation of Kabukichō, called Kamurochō. Instead, most of the gameplay takes place in the Yokohama district of Isezaki Ijincho, which is based on Yokohama's real-life Isezakichō district. However, Kamurochō and the Osaka district Sotenbori (another area from previous Yakuza games, based on the real-life Dōtonbori district) are featured in the game. Yokohama's criminal underworld consists of three interconnected factions known as the Ijin Three: the Chinese-Japanese gang Yokohama Liumang, the Korean-Japanese Geomijul mafia, an offshoot of the Jingweon Mafia, and the local yakuza organization, the Seiryu Clan.

Yakuza: Like a Dragon is also the first main series game not to have Kazuma Kiryu (Takaya Kuroda/Darryl Kurylo) as its protagonist, though he appears in a supporting capacity. Its lead character is Ichiban Kasuga (Kazuhiro Nakaya/Kaiji Tang), a low-ranking member of the Arakawa Family, a subsidiary of the Kanto-based Tojo Clan. Mandatory playable characters who join Kasuga's party include Yu Nanba (Ken Yasuda/Greg Chun), a homeless ex-nurse; Koichi Adachi (Akio Otsuka/Andrew Morgado), a former police officer; Saeko Mukoda (Sumire Uesaka/Elizabeth Maxwell), a hostess bar manager; Joongi Han (Note: Joongi Han and Seonhee's names in English localization were originally spelled Joon-gi Han and Seong-hui, respectively, but were corrected with the release of Like a Dragon: Infinite Wealth.) (Yuichi Nakamura/Keong Sim), a Geomijul operative and the body double of the Jingweon Mafia leader of the same name from Yakuza 6; and Tianyou Zhao (Nobuhiko Okamoto/Robbie Daymond), leader of the Liumang. A fictionalized version of Japanese actress Eri Kamataki appears as a character of the same name (voiced in Japanese by herself and in English by Eden Riegel), as the chief executive officer of Ichiban Confections who recruits Kasuga to help turn her company around as part of the business management minigame. She may be recruited as an optional party member once the player reaches the first milestone objective within the minigame.

Important non-player characters include Masumi Arakawa (Kiichi Nakai/George Takei), (Note: Johnny Yong Bosch voices a younger Masumi Arakawa during flashback scenes in the English dub.) the patriarch of the Arakawa Family; Masato Arakawa (Kohsuke Toriumi/Will Yun Lee), Arakawa's son who falsified his identity to become Ryo Aoki, the upstart Governor of Tokyo; Jo Sawashiro (Shinichi Tsutsumi/Brian Bloom), Arakawa's long serving right-hand man and the captain of the Arakawa Family; Sota Kume (Daisuke Hirakawa/Zach Aguilar), a fanatical member of Bleach Japan, a political movement that seeks to cleanse Japan of its 'grey zones' (e.g. prostitution, illegal immigration, organized crime etc.) and protégé of Aoki; Seonhee (Hana Takeda/Fiona Rene), the head of the Geomijul; Ryuhei Hoshino (Tetsuo Kanao/JB Blanc), chairman of the Seiryu Clan; Akira Mabuchi (Masanori Takeda/Ed Bosco), the second-in-command of the Liumang; Reiji Ishioda (Show Hayami/Rino Romano), a lieutenant of the Osaka-based Omi Alliance; and Yosuke Tendo (Miou Tanaka/John Eric Bentley), an opportunistic Omi Alliance member and disgraced former professional boxer. Other characters include: Mitsuo Yasumura (Satoshi Tsuruoka/SungWon Cho), Kasuga's oath brother in the Arakawa Family; Nick Ogata (Kazumasa Nakamura/Ray Chase), a wealthy businessman who befriends Kasuga and occasionally provides him financial support; Isao Nonomiya (Yōhei Tadano/William Salyers), the owner of a soapland in Ijincho who hires Kasuga and his party to investigate a conspiracy involving his employee; and Mamoru Takabe (Daichi Endo/Darin De Paul), captain of the Seiryu Clan.

In addition to Kiryu, several characters from previous Yakuza titles also return in supporting roles: Osamu Kashiwagi (Shunsuke Sakuya/David Hayter), a former senior Tojo Clan member who survived the events of Yakuza 3 and became proprietor of the Survive bar in Ijincho; Daigo Dojima (Satoshi Tokushige/Roger Craig Smith), sixth chairman of the Tojo Clan; Goro Majima (Hidenari Ugaki/Matthew Mercer) and Taiga Saejima (Rikiya Koyama/Ron Yuan), senior Tojo Clan members who accompany Daigo; Masaru Watase (Rintarō Nishi/James C. Burns), captain of the Omi Alliance; and Makoto Date (Kazuhiro Yamaji/Bill Farmer), a Kamurochō police detective and long-time friend of Adachi.

=== Plot ===
In 2001, Masumi Arakawa persuades Ichiban Kasuga to confess to a murder that his captain, Jo Sawashiro, allegedly committed, to protect the latter's reputation. Kasuga, feeling indebted to Arakawa, agrees to shoulder the blame for the crime. Arakawa promises to greet Kasuga upon his release. 18 years later, after serving his sentence, Kasuga is released from jail, but Arakawa is nowhere to be seen. He is picked up by police officer Koichi Adachi, who reveals that the Tojo Clan has perished, and in its place, Kamurocho has become the territory of its rival, the Omi Alliance. Adachi also informs Kasuga that Arakawa was responsible as he betrayed the clan to join the Omi, while Arakawa's son Masato, whom Kasuga once chauffeured, has died due to his deteriorating health. Seeking to expose the truth together, they crash an Omi Alliance meeting held by Arakawa. Adachi is arrested for trespassing whilst Arakawa shoots Kasuga.

Three days later, a homeless man named Yu Nanba heals Kasuga's wounds after discovering his body in Isezaki Ijincho. Nanba sees a counterfeit bill in Kasuga's pocket and tells him that he is safe from the Omi Alliance because Ijincho is hostile territory. Kasuga and Nanba meet Adachi, where they agree to work for soapland owner Isao Nonomiya to make extra money. After uncovering a conspiracy plot at the city's retirement home, the gang discovers that Nonomiya is murdered, which alerts Saeko Mukoda, one of his employees. Determined to find Nonomiya's murderer, Saeko joins Kasuga's team. The party discovers that his killer is Akira Mabuchi, a lieutenant of the Yokohama Liumang. They also uncover the Liumang's collaboration with the Geomijul Mafia and Seiryu Clan in running a money counterfeiting scheme. This money is used by Yutaka Ogikubo, a high-profile politician, to bribe the local police into effectively preserving peace.

The Liumang catch the group investigating the scheme and turns them over to Mabuchi. Mabuchi reveals that he deliberately engineered the prior events so that he could frame the party as warmongering Seiryu Clan members. Joongi Han, the second-in-command of the Geomijul, saves the party from Mabuchi. Mabuchi nonetheless executes two Seiryu Clan members to provoke further retaliation. Kasuga's party heads to the Geomijul HQ so that they can find proof of Mabuchi's guilt and convince the other Ijincho gangs to not war against each other. Seonhee, the leader of Geomijul, reveals to everyone that Nanba pretended to be homeless so that he could investigate his brother's disappearance after the latter tried to expose the money counterfeiting scheme. She rallies the Geomijul and the Liumang into executing Nanba, prompting him to seek refuge in the HQ of Bleach Japan, co-founded by Tokyo's governor Ryo Aoki. Kasuga eventually deduces that Aoki is Masato, who took on a new identity and used Bleach Japan to cleanse Kamurocho of the Tojo Clan's influence. However, as the police were afraid of a power vacuum, Aoki ordered the Omi Alliance to take over Kamurocho with Arakawa's help. Aoki seeks to win the support of Ijincho by undermining the Yokohama underworld by bribing Mabuchi into provoking a civil war.

The Omi Alliance, under the guise of Bleach Japan, and Nanba invade the Geomijul HQ, though they are defeated by Kasuga's party. The Geomijul burns evidence of the entire money counterfeiting scheme so that Ogikubo's reputation is not damaged during the election season. Tianyou Zhao, the leader of the Liumang, enraged by Mabuchi's betrayal, vows to spare Nanba if they can save the Geomijul from the Omi. Touched by Zhao's solidarity, the Geomijul warm up to Kasuga's party, with Han and Zhao joining them, the latter also relinquishing his leadership of the Liumang to Seonhee. Nanba, having realized the error of his ways, rejoins the team to expose Aoki.

Meanwhile, Aoki employs his right-hand man Sota Kume to run for candidacy as Yokohama's regional representative. At the advice of Seiryu Clan chairman Ryuhei Hoshino, Kasuga runs as an independent candidate to stop Aoki's plans. Hoshino also tells Kasuga that Arakawa never intended to kill him; after the shooting, Arakawa placed the counterfeit bill in his pocket, given to him by Hoshino, so that Kasuga could visit Hoshino on his behalf. Hoshino had previously killed Arakawa's father for stealing the counterfeit money, with Arakawa eventually forgiving him; his decision to hand the bill back to Hoshino even though Arakawa had the power to expose it was evidence.

Tipped off by his former oath brother Mitsuo Yasumura, Kasuga learns that Arakawa pretended to work for the Omi Alliance the entire time. Kasuga and his party travel to Sotenbori, Osaka, and attend an Omi Alliance meeting, where Arakawa, along with Tojo Clan's sixth chairman Daigo Dojima, and Omi Alliance Captain Masaru Watase, formally disband both organizations to stop Aoki from using them as pawns. Kasuga and his party, joined by Omi lieutenant Yosuke Tendo and Tojo officers Goro Majima and Taiga Saejima, battle the rioting Omi members; they are later joined by former Tojo Clan chairman Kazuma Kiryu, who reveals himself as Watase's anonymous bodyguard. After the battle, Kasuga reconciles with Arakawa and learns that Aoki was the one who committed the murder 18 years ago. The next day, however, Arakawa is assassinated on Aoki's orders. Aoki also discovers the circumstances behind Kasuga's candidacy and, as such, orders Sawashiro to kill Hoshino.

Kasuga arrives at the Seiryu Clan HQ, albeit too late as Hoshino is killed. Kasuga defeats Sawashiro, prompting him to reveal the truth: Aoki is actually Sawashiro's biological son, while Kasuga is Arakawa's legitimate son; As Arakawa's girlfriend Akane was hunted down by the yakuza, Arakawa told Akane to put the baby inside one of the coin lockers to ensure the baby's safety. At the same time, Sawashiro and his confidante, having birthed a son, decided to abandon their baby at the coin lockers. Arakawa eventually took Sawashiro's baby, while his actual baby was adopted by Kasuga's father, Jiro. Sawashiro eventually turned himself in to the police.

Kiryu later meets Kasuga's party and reveals to them, based on intel provided by the Daidoji faction, (Note: The Daidoji faction is not named directly, and only referred to as "the Fixer's men".) that Aoki has dispatched assassins after Sawashiro as the latter planned to expose Aoki's guilt. Kasuga's party stops the assassins and then returns to Kamurocho, where they arrange a hoax using incriminating evidence to lure out both Aoki and Tendo, the latter being responsible for Arakawa's murder. Kasuga defeats Tendo in combat, then the group secretly feigns defeat to trick Aoki into verbally revealing his intent to murder. Kasuga's party publicly leaks the video as Aoki escapes. Kasuga eventually finds him at the coin lockers. As Kasuga tearfully begs Aoki to turn himself in, Kume fatally stabs Aoki, outraged by his hypocrisy.

Sometime later, the evidence found in Arakawa's headquarters leads to the arrest of all Kamurochō officials who accepted his bribe money. Kasuga attends the funeral for Arakawa and Aoki, and decides to remain in Ijincho after turning down Daigo's job offer for a security firm staffed by ex-yakuza in Osaka.

== Development ==
The game was initially announced on August 26, 2017, alongside Fist of the North Star: Lost Paradise and Yakuza Online. During development, the project was code-named Shin Ryu ga Gotoku, meaning "New Like a Dragon" or "Like a New Dragon," or "Shin-Yakuza" in English. Sega announced that the game's story was completed at the end of May 2019. Sega received permission from Square Enix's Dragon Quest series creator Yuji Horii to mention Dragon Quest in the game, which was Kasuga's favorite video game. Series creator Toshihiro Nagoshi said that the new style of logo was done to reflect Kasuga's differing personality compared to Kazuma Kiryu. Sega staff explained in a 2019 interview that they wanted to try a different style of gameplay, but that if it is badly received, they intend to return to real-time combat for future games. The game's main theme, "Ichibanka" (一番歌, Number One Song), was performed by Shonan no Kaze, who previously performed the main themes of Yakuza 0 and Kurohyō 2: Ryū ga Gotoku Ashura hen, and Yasutaka Nakata.

The game is the first mainline Yakuza title to receive an English dub since the original Yakuza in 2005. Alongside the English dub, as in Judgment, it also features dual English subtitle sets: one with the Japanese audio with English subtitles matching the Japanese translation, and the other matching the English dub. Localizations in French, German, Italian, and Spanish focus on the Japanese audio, regardless of the selected voice language. The International release in Japan and Asia, as well as the Western release via an update, has dual audio and eleven subtitle and text languages (including three new languages), Portuguese, Russian, Japanese, Simplified Chinese, Traditional Chinese, and Korean to the previous five languages (French, German, Italian, Spanish, Portuguese and Russian are only available in the Western release on PS5; all other versions have all languages present regardless of region). For the first time in the series, karaoke songs in the English dub are sung in English by the English voice cast, with the English versions displaying the English lyrics (on all languages) and the Japanese versions displaying the Japanese romaji lyrics (only when the language set to English, French, German, Italian, Spanish, Portuguese or Russian; Japanese kanji lyrics when set to Japanese; Traditional Chinese lyrics when set to Traditional Chinese and Simplified Chinese; Korean lyrics when set to Korean), unlike the Yakuza Remastered Collection, in which lyrics between the Japanese kanji and romaji and English translation can be toggled. Darryl Kurylo and Bill Farmer reprise their roles from the original Yakuza as Kazuma Kiryu and Makoto Date, respectively. Matthew Mercer replaces Mark Hamill as Goro Majima, David Hayter replaces John DiMaggio as Osamu Kashiwagi (credited as "The Bartender"), and Isaac C. Singleton Jr. replaces Gary Anthony Williams as Gary Buster Holmes.

== Release ==
The game was released in Japan on January 16, 2020, for PlayStation 4, with the Traditional Chinese and Korean versions being released in Asia on the same day. It was released worldwide for PlayStation 4, Xbox One, and the Xbox Series X/S on November 10, 2020. It was released for Windows on the same day, but purchase of the Windows version of the game was blocked in various countries and territories in East Asia and Southeast Asia. A PlayStation 5 version was released on March 2, 2021. A version for Amazon Luna was made available on December 10, 2021.

Although the game's release for the Xbox One, Xbox Series X/S and PC in Japan and Asia was originally announced in November 2020 as "postponed indefinitely", the game was released for the platforms in Japan and Asia on February 25, 2021. This version of the game was titled International, as it contains some features introduced with the worldwide release, such as the English audio track option, the additional costume sets, and the New Game Plus downloadable content included. This version was also released in the region for the PlayStation 5 on March 2, 2021, the same day as its worldwide release. Anyone who makes the purchase of the PS5 version can unlock the "Legends Costume Set" for free.

RGG Studios reported that they're working on making the necessary changes to correct errors for buyers who purchased the free PS4 to PS5 upgrade.

== Reception ==
Reception

Aggregate scores
Aggregator	Score
Metacritic	PC: 83/100; PS4: 84/100; XONE: 89/100; XSX: 83/100; PS5: 86/100
OpenCritic	90% recommend (Note: Based on 155 reviews)

Review scores
Publication	Score
Destructoid	7.5/10
Famitsu	38/40
Game Informer	9.25/10
GameSpot	9/10
GamesRadar+	4.5/5
IGN	7/10
PC Gamer (US)	72/100
Push Square	8/10
RPGamer	4/5
RPGFan	94/100

Yakuza: Like a Dragon received "generally favorable reviews", according to the review aggregation website Metacritic. Fellow review aggregator OpenCritic assessed that the game received "mighty" approval, being recommended by 91% of critics. Critics praised the game's new take on the Yakuza series alongside the characters, but criticized the turn-based battles as being repetitive towards the end of the game.

In a positive review for Game Informer, Jeff Cork praised the new protagonist, writing, "Without the weight of half a dozen or so games and their associated histories on his shoulders, Kasuga is a blank slate for this new Yokohama adventure. Kasuga certainly has goals and motivations... but the fact that he's such a small figure in this world creates an exhilarating feeling of freedom". Cork also enjoyed the game's job system saying that it "holds a satisfying amount of depth" and allows for unique party combinations.

Jordan Devore of Destructoid disliked the long animations in combat, "Early on, I had a fun enough time watching these chaotic and slightly out-of-control scenes unfold. They didn't drag on. But at a certain point, I got so sick of waiting for Ichiban and co. to run up and actually perform their attacks". Additionally, Devore wrote that, "Put another way, Like a Dragon's turn-based combat is fine, but fine can only go so far when hours-long brick walls force you to stop and grind for XP so you can stand a reasonable chance against beefy boss encounters."

Yahtzee Croshaw of The Escapist called Yakuza: Like a Dragon the third best game of 2020, praising it for turning around the Yakuza franchise "with its fun characters and greater lean into the inherent silliness of the franchise." In his review of the game he commended it for how "a likeable protagonist and a bit more of a lean into the usual wackiness it has successfully charmed the nurses into keeping the life support machine plugged in. Every Yakuza game is basically a loose box of disconnected toys, but for the record, this is a particularly nice box with some choice toys. Like, Legos and Masters of the Universe."

=== Sales ===
Yakuza: Like a Dragon was the best selling print game during its first 4 days on sale in Japan, with 300,000 copies sold. By March 2020, a total of 450,000 digital and physical copies had been sold in Japan and Asia.

By December 2023, Yakuza: Like a Dragon had sold 1.8 million units worldwide, with 400,000 of those units being sold in Japan.

By June 2025, it would be revealed that Yakuza: Like a Dragon had sold 2.8 million units.

=== Awards ===
Yakuza: Like a Dragon was awarded a Japan Game Awards Award for Excellence in the Future Division at the Tokyo Game Show 2019.

Yakuza: Like a Dragon received nominations for "Best RPG" at The Game Awards 2020, and "Role-Playing Game of the Year" at the 24th Annual D.I.C.E. Awards, but lost both to Final Fantasy VII Remake. The game also received a nomination for Ultimate Game of the Year at the Golden Joystick Awards.

Yakuza: Like a Dragon was also awarded with a PlayStation Partner Awards Partner Award for achieving "particularly noteworthy results". Other awards included Hilarious Humor at the Dreamies, and OUTSTANDING Game, Franchise Role Playing at the 2020 NAVGTR Awards where it was also nominated in seven other categories.
