= Destroy All Humans! =

- Genre: Action-adventure
- Developers: Pandemic Studios (2005–2006); Locomotive Games (2008); Sandblast Games (2008); Black Forest Games (2020–present)
- Publishers: THQ (2005–2008); THQ Nordic (2020–present)
- Platforms: PlayStation 2, Xbox, Wii, PlayStation 3, Xbox 360, PlayStation 4, Xbox One, PlayStation 5, Xbox Series X/S, Microsoft Windows, Stadia, Nintendo Switch
- First release: Destroy All Humans! (2005); June 21, 2005
- Latest release: Destroy All Humans! 2: Reprobed; August 30, 2022

Destroy All Humans! is an open world action-adventure video game franchise that is designed as a parody of Cold War-era alien invasion films. Destroy All Humans! and Destroy All Humans! 2 were released for the PlayStation 2 and Xbox; Destroy All Humans! Big Willy Unleashed was released for the Wii; and Destroy All Humans! Path of the Furon was released for the Xbox 360 and PlayStation 3. Remakes of the original game and its sequel were developed by Black Forest Games and were released in 2020 and 2022, respectively.

The two main protagonists of the series are voiced by J. Grant Albrecht and Richard Steven Horvitz, with the exception of the game Big Willy Unleashed, in which actors Sean Donnellan and Darryl Kurylo portray the characters. The musical score for the series is performed by composer Garry Schyman.

== Setting ==
The games take place mostly on Earth where the Furon Cryptosporidium, also known as Crypto, is tasked by his superiors to gather Furon DNA locked inside human brain stems in order to save his race from cloning themselves to extinction. In Destroy All Humans!, Crypto's objectives also include investigating what happened to his previous clone. Destroy All Humans! 2 features Crypto hunting for revenge, after the KGB try to assassinate him and successfully destroy the mothership and his mission officer, Orthopox-13 (Pox), as well as exterminating the Furons' enemy from the Martian War, the Blisk. Destroy All Humans! Big Willy Unleashed involves Crypto protecting Pox's new fast food chain using a giant robot mech disguised as the restaurant's mascot, called "Big Willy". Destroy All Humans! Path of the Furon is available on Xbox 360 (and PlayStation 3 only in Australia and Europe), and involves Crypto seeking enlightenment to help him stop a conspiracy that threatens the Furon empire. Destroy All Humans! takes place in 1959; Destroy All Humans! 2 takes place in 1969; Destroy All Humans! Big Willy Unleashed takes place in 1975; Destroy All Humans! Path of the Furon takes place in 1979.

== Games ==
Aggregate review scores
Game	Metacritic
Destroy All Humans! (2005)	(PS2) 74/100 (Xbox) 76/100
Destroy All Humans! 2	(PS2) 74/100 (Xbox) 74/100
Destroy All Humans! Big Willy Unleashed	(Wii) 53/100
Destroy All Humans! Path of the Furon	(X360) 34/100
Destroy All Humans! (2020)	(NS) 66/100 (PC) 71/100 (PS4) 70/100 (XONE) 68/100
Destroy All Humans! 2: Reprobed	(PC) 72/100 (PS5) 67/100 (XSXS) 72/100

=== Destroy All Humans! (2005) ===
During the year 1959, Cryptosporidium 137 first arrived on Earth to investigate the planet and search for his predecessor clone, Cryptosporidium 136, who disappeared in 1947 after Orthopox 13 sent him to Earth on a similar mission. Pox sends Crypto on a mission to harvest human brain stems (which contain a small amount of pure Furon DNA due to an encounter between Furon warriors and humans in ancient times) to prevent his species from going extinct. To accomplish his mission, he must fight and defeat the Majestic agency, a shadowy government organization led by a black-clad figure named Silhouette. After accomplishing this, Crypto takes over the United States by posing as the president.

=== Destroy All Humans! (mobile) (2005) ===
Destroy All Humans! (mobile) was a tie-in mobile phone game developed by Big Blue Bubble Inc. and published by THQ Wireless. The game could be downloaded by texting CRYPTO101 to 69847 (MYTYHQ). It was released in 2005. The game is a top-down action-adventure game where you play as Crypto, both on foot and in his saucer.

=== Destroy All Humans! 2 (2006) ===
Ten years have passed since Crypto defeated Majestic and replaced the U.S. president. Orthropox 13 has died after a Soviet nuclear missile destroyed the Furon mothership. Pox has downloaded his consciousness into a personal holographic projector designed to communicate between Furons on Motherships and planet surfaces. Pox's unit, dubbed a HoloPox, allows him to communicate with, advise, and vex Crypto down on Earth. Crypto 137 has died of unknown causes but appears in Big Willy Unleashed and Crypto 138, a clone with pure Furon DNA harvested from human brains, has taken his place. Crypto 138 is the first Furon in millennia to possess genitalia, as his pure DNA has not been corrupted by radiation. When the KGB destroy the mothership and Pox, Crypto must fight them and stop them from destroying what he has worked so hard to achieve. Along the way, he is supported by Natalya Ivanova, a rogue KGB agent whom he constantly hits on. He also discovers the true enemy that is responsible for everything happening in the game: the Blisk, an alien race from Mars who are the ancient enemy of the Furons, whom they thought they defeated in the Martian War.

=== Destroy All Humans! Big Willy Unleashed (2008) ===
Big Willy Unleashed takes place after Destroy All Humans! 2. Crypto and Pox start a fast food restaurant that serves human meat from all the people Crypto has killed harvesting more Furon DNA. Later, their rival restaurant, Colonel Kluckin' (a parody of Colonel Sanders), discovers their secret, whereupon Crypto must protect the restaurant with the Big Willy mascot mech.

=== Destroy All Humans! Path of the Furon (2008) ===
Using the money earned from the Big Willy fast food franchise that Orthopox started in Big Willy Unleashed, Pox and his destructive Furon warrior minion Crypto have opened a casino which they use to obtain a steady financial income and human DNA. Crypto has lost his motivation because of the death of Natalya (which was a clone with a four-year lifespan) and has forgotten what it means to destroy humans. One night he gets drunk and crashes his old saucer into a casino, perishing in the crash. Orthopox creates Crypto 139, and the two continue the operation. Later Crypto is attacked by mysterious cyborgs called Nexosporidium Warriors, who arrive from his own planet, which frightens both Crypto and his commander Pox. Soon Crypto finds himself face-to-face with a conspiracy from his own homeworld that, if not stopped, could destroy his entire race. In the midst of all the chaos, Crypto hears a voice in his head, telling him to go to the city of Shen Long. Later, Crypto, while in Sunnywood, is shot in the neck, faints, and then wakes up in a Kung Fu monastery where he is greeted by a Furon martial arts expert known as The Master. The Master beseeches him to submit to his tutelage, and train in mind and firepower, to help him defeat these new threats. Now Crypto is about to go down the path to enlightenment, shape his own destiny, and uncover who is behind this frightening conspiracy.

=== Destroy All Humans! (2020) ===
The franchise intellectual property holder, THQ, went bankrupt on December 19, 2012, and its many IPs were subsequently sold off. In 2013, Nordic Games, now known as THQ Nordic, purchased the rights to Destroy All Humans! among other IPs for $4.9 million. In late 2016, the PlayStation 2 versions of Destroy All Humans! and Destroy All Humans! 2 were released on PlayStation 4 as part of a selection of PlayStation 2 games emulated on PlayStation 4, and were rendered at 1080p with additional features that supported trophies and remote play. In 2018, the Xbox version of Destroy All Humans! was added to the Xbox One's backwards compatibility catalog.

In 2019, THQ Nordic announced a remake of Destroy All Humans! via a reveal trailer shown at E3. It was developed by Black Forest Games and released on July 28, 2020 for Microsoft Windows, PlayStation 4 and Xbox One, on December 8, 2020 for Stadia, and on June 29, 2021 for Nintendo Switch.

==== Destroy All Humans! Clone Carnage (2022) ====
A standalone multiplayer spin-off, Destroy All Humans! Clone Carnage, was released for Microsoft Windows (via Steam, Epic Games Store and GOG.com), PlayStation 4 and Xbox One on May 31, 2022. On November 2, 2022, the Xbox One and PC versions of game were made free-to-play.

=== Destroy All Humans! 2: Reprobed (2022) ===
In 2021, THQ Nordic announced a remake of Destroy All Humans! 2 via a reveal trailer shown with development being handled by Black Forest Games. It was released on August 30, 2022 for Microsoft Windows, PlayStation 5 and Xbox Series X/S.
