= Land's End (TV series) =

- Genre: Crime drama
- Created by: Fred Dryer; Victor A. Schiro; Peter Gethers; David Handler
- Starring: Fred Dryer
- Composer: Garry Schyman
- Country of origin: United States
- Original language: English
- No. of seasons: 1
- No. of episodes: 22

Production
- Executive producers: Fred Dryer; Victor A. Schiro; Brian K. Ross; Jim Reid
- Camera setup: Single-camera
- Running time: 60 minutes
- Production companies: Fred Dryer Productions; Skyvision Partners; Buena Vista Television

Original release
- Network: Syndication
- Release: September 20, 1995 – May 18, 1996

Land's End is an American crime drama series that aired in broadcast syndication from September 1995 to May 1996. A total of 22 one-hour episodes were produced. The series was created by the series' star Fred Dryer and Victor A. Schiro.

== Premise ==
The series focuses on Mike Land (Dryer), a former LAPD cop who left the force after a case he worked on for months resulted in the acquittal of a drug lord. Mike then moved to Cabo San Lucas to work as a private investigator for his friend Willis P. Dunleevy, and to serve as director of security for the Westin Regina Resort.

== Cast ==
- Fred Dryer as Mike Land
- Geoffrey Lewis as Willis P. Dunleevy
- Tim Thomerson as Dave 'Thunder' Thorton
- Pamela Bowen as Courtney Saunders
- William Marquez as Chief Raoul Ruiz

== Production ==
The series was filmed on location in Cabo San Lucas. Series creator Fred Dyer and Victor A. Schiro co-wrote some of the 22 episodes.

== Episodes ==
No.	Title	Directed by	Written by	Original release date
1–2	"Land's End"	James Bruce	Peter Gethers & David Handler	September 20, 1995
3	"Night Eyes"	John Huneck	Alfonso Moreno	September 30, 1995
4	"Parentnapping"	James Bruce	Peter Koper	October 8, 1995
5	"A Line in the Sand"	John Huneck	Lincoln Kibbee	October 14, 1995
6	"Day of the Dead"	Jefferson Kibbee	Norman Lapidus & L. Lee Lapidus	October 21, 1995
7	"El Perico"	Martin Pasetta Jr.	Norman Lapidus & L. Lee Lapidus	October 28, 1995
8	"Bounty Hunter"	Unknown	Unknown	November 4, 1995
9	"Willis Gets Lucky"	Paul Abascal	Alfonso Moreno	November 11, 1995
10	"What Are Friends For"	Geoffrey Lewis	Lincoln Kibbee	November 18, 1995
11	"The Curse of Willis"	James Bruce	Story by : Fred Dryer & Victor A. Schiro; Teleplay by : John Clarkson	November 25, 1995
12	"What Ever Happened to Maria Rosa?"	Christian Faber	Peter Koper	December 2, 1995
13	"Windfall"	Jefferson Kibbee	Peter Gethers & David Handler	December 23, 1995
14	"The Long Arm of the Law"	Martin Pasetta Jr.	Gene Miller & Karen Kavner	February 3, 1996
15	"Fool's Gold"	Jefferson Kibbee	Story by : Fred Dryer & Victor A. Schiro; Teleplay by : Elliot Stern	February 10, 1996
16	"Dr. Amore"	Paul Abascal	Story by : Tom Hazelton & John LeMasters; Teleplay by : John LeMasters	February 17, 1996
17	"Red Cadillac"	Jefferson Kibbee	Alfonso Moreno	February 24, 1996
18	"Pieces of 8 Is Enough"	Unknown	Unknown	March 2, 1996
19	"Girls Just Wanna Have Fun"	James Bruce	John Clarkson	April 27, 1996
20	"Who's Killing Cole Porter?"	Paul Abascal	Alfonso Moreno	May 4, 1996
21	"Mothers Behind Bars"	Paul Lynch	Norman Lapidus & L. Lee Lapidus	May 11, 1996
22	"Jenny"	Geoffrey Lewis	Story by : Geoffrey Lewis; Teleplay by : Peter Koper	May 18, 1996
