= Destroy All Humans! (2020 video game) =

2020 remake of the 2005 video game

- Developer: Black Forest Games (Note: Original game developed by Pandemic Studios)
- Publisher: THQ Nordic
- Directors: Jean-Marc Haessig; Onurhan Karaagacli (Note: Brad Welch was the director of the original game.)
- Producers: Bernard Janssens; Dennis Schiefer; Jim Howard (Note: Gordon Moyes was the producer of the original game.)
- Designer: David Sallmann (Note: Brad Welch was the lead designer of the original game.)
- Programmers: Johannes Conradie; Jacomi Conradie; Manuel Umbach (Note: Adam Iarossi was the lead programmer of the original game.)
- Artist: Eric Urocki (Note: Fiona Francois was the lead artist of the original game.)
- Writers: Hans-Jörg Knabel; Maria Clevy (Note: Tom Abernathy was the writer of the original game.)
- Composer: Garry Schyman (Note: Schyman was the composer of the original game. He provided the development team with the recordings of his original score to be used in the remake, but did not compose any new music.)
- Series: Destroy All Humans!
- Engine: Unreal Engine 4
- Platforms: PlayStation 4; Windows; Xbox One; Stadia; Nintendo Switch; Nintendo Switch 2
- Release: PS4, Windows, Xbox One; July 28, 2020; Stadia; December 8, 2020; Nintendo Switch; June 29, 2021; Nintendo Switch 2 June 23, 2026
- Genre: Action-adventure
- Mode: Single-player

Destroy All Humans! is an action-adventure video game developed by Black Forest Games and published by THQ Nordic. It is a remake of the 2005 original game and the fifth installment in the Destroy All Humans! franchise. It is the first entry in the franchise since Path of the Furon (2008).

Destroy All Humans! was released for PlayStation 4, Windows, and Xbox One on 28 July 2020, for Stadia on 8 December 2020, for Nintendo Switch on 29 June 2021, and for Nintendo Switch 2 on 23 June 2026. The game received mixed reviews from critics and had sold over 1 million units by May 2021. A sequel, Destroy All Humans! 2: Reprobed, was released in 2022.

== Gameplay ==
The game is played from a third-person perspective. The player controls Cryptosporidium 137 ("Crypto" for short), an alien who arrives on Earth in 1950s America to harvest human DNA. Crypto is equipped with a vast arsenal of alien weapons, such as the Zap-O-Matic and Anal Probe, to defeat enemies. He also has superhuman skills, such as psychokinetic powers and the ability to disguise himself as humans. Crypto can use a jetpack to quickly navigate the environment. He can also command the flying saucer, which is equipped with a death ray to kill opponents. Players can perform movements such as gliding and dashing, and they can chain actions together such as shooting enemies while levitating them. The game introduces the Focus Mode, which allows players to lock onto other enemies. Crypto is protected by a shield, which informs players of the direction of hostile attacks. The game features six sandbox locations which can be explored freely. Each location offers unique challenges for players to complete.

== Development ==
A team of 60 people in Black Forest Games served as the game's developer. The original game's dialogue and humor remained intact, though the team enhanced them by updating the character models and cutscenes and introducing motion capture. Instead of re-recording the lines, the team used the audio from the original game and improved its quality for the remake. The game also includes a mission named "Lost Mission of Area 42" that was scrapped during the development of the original game. Black Forest considered developing the remake as a "natural continuation" of their work after finishing the development of Fade to Silence as they learned more about utilizing the technology and designing large, open areas.

THQ Nordic acquired the intellectual property rights from THQ in 2013. In 2017, the firm reaffirmed that the company realized the demand for a new game in the series and added that they were exploring options to revitalize the franchise. The game was officially announced in June 2019. An extended gameplay demo was launched at E3 2019. It was released for PlayStation 4, Windows, Xbox One and Stadia. A standalone multiplayer spin-off, titled Destroy All Humans! Clone Carnage was released for PlayStation 4, Xbox One and Windows via Steam, on May 31, 2022.

== Reception ==
Reception

Aggregate score
Aggregator	Score
Metacritic	(NS) 66/100 (PC) 71/100 (PS4) 70/100 (XONE) 68/100

Review scores
Publication	Score
Destructoid	7/10
Game Informer	6/10
GameRevolution	3.5/5
GameSpot	6/10
Hardcore Gamer	4/5
IGN	7/10
Nintendo Life	6/10
Push Square	6/10
Shacknews	7/10
TouchArcade	3/5
VideoGamer.com	7/10

Destroy All Humans! received "mixed or average" reviews from critics according to review aggregator website Metacritic.

=== Sales ===
Destroy All Humans! sales exceeded THQ Nordic's expectations. By May 2021, the game had sold over 1 million units.
