= Black Forest Games =

German video game developer

Black Forest Games GmbH
- Type: Subsidiary
- Industry: Video games
- Predecessor: Spellbound Entertainment
- Founded: 13 July 2012; 14 years ago
- Founder: Andreas Speer
- Headquarters: Offenburg, Germany
- Key people: Andreas Speer (CEO)
- Products: Giana Sisters series
- Number of employees: 50 (2024)
- Parent: THQ Nordic (2017–2026)
- Website: black-forest-games.com

Black Forest Games GmbH is a German video game developer based in Offenburg. The company was founded in July 2012 by a team of 40 staff members, including chief executive officer Andreas Speer, previously employed by Spellbound Entertainment, which filed for insolvency earlier that year. In August 2017, it is a subsidiary of THQ Nordic. In November 2026, Black Forest Games has spun off from THQ Nordic, becoming independent again. As of August 2024, the company employs 50 people.

== History ==
Following the release of Arcania: Fall of Setarrif, the game's developer, Spellbound Entertainment, filed for insolvency in March 2012. Upon completion, on 13 July 2012, the opening of Black Forest Games in Offenburg as a successor to Spellbound was announced, employing 40 of the Spellbound's former 65 staff. Under these 40 was most of the former management, including chief executive officer Andreas Speer.

In July 2012, Black Forest Games started a Kickstarter campaign for a new installment of The Great Giana Sisters tentatively titled Project Giana, stating "Project Giana is the grandchild of The Great Giana Sisters". The game features music from The Great Giana Sisters' original composer Chris Huelsbeck and the Swedish "SID metal" band Machinae Supremacy. Giana Sisters: Twisted Dreams was released on October 23, 2012 for PC with later releases on Xbox Live Arcade, PlayStation Network, and Nintendo eShop.

Rogue Stormers was revealed at the Game Developers Conference 2010 in San Francisco under the project name RavensDale, although it has been in development since 2007. After an unsuccessful attempt on Kickstarter in 2013 the game was put on hold. In a second attempt in early 2014 the game, then known as DieselStormers, was successfully funded on Kickstarter and went to Steam early access in July 2014.

Due to a trademark registration of DieselStormers by Diesel S.p.A.'s successful trademark lawsuit, Black Forest Games decided to change the name from DieselStormers to Rogue Stormers. Fade to Silence was announced at The Game Awards 2017. It is a survival game set in a snow-covered forest, requiring the player to collect resources, build a refuge, and recruit others as followers to survive. The game entered early access on Steam on 14 December 2017, and had its full release on 30 April 2019 for Microsoft Windows, PlayStation 4, and Xbox One. The game was published by THQ Nordic.

In June 2019, THQ Nordic announced that a remake of the 2005 science fiction game Destroy All Humans! was in development at Black Forest Studios, set for a release in 2020 for Microsoft Windows, PlayStation 4, and Xbox One. It features content that was cut from the original release. An extended gameplay demo was launched at E3 2019.

In August 2023, it was announced that Black Forest Studios would develop a game based on Teenage Mutant Ninja Turtles: The Last Ronin, with the game set to release on PlayStation 5, Xbox Series X/S, and Microsoft Windows. However, in June 2026, it was revealed that the development of the game has stopped, while at the same time announcing a new version of the game developed by PlatinumGames, with Paramount Games Studio set to publish it on consoles and PC.

The studio laid off roughly 50% of its team in January 2024, with the creative directors and most of the executives keeping their jobs.

In November 2026, it was announced that Black Forest Games had spun-off THQ Nordic, becoming independent again. The two companies will continue to collaborate on unannounced projects. They have also co-founded an independent game studios group called Third Signal.

== Games developed ==
Year	Title	Platform(s)
2012	Giana Sisters: Twisted Dreams	Microsoft Windows
2013	Giana Sisters: Twisted Dreams	PlayStation 3, Wii U, Xbox 360
2013	Giana Sisters: Twisted Dreams - Rise of the Owlverlord	Microsoft Windows
2014	Giana Sisters: Twisted Dreams - Directors Cut	PlayStation 4, Xbox One
2015	Giana Sisters: Dream Runners	Microsoft Windows, PlayStation 4, Xbox One
2016	Rogue Stormers	Linux, Microsoft Windows, PlayStation 4, Xbox One
2016	Titan Quest: Anniversary Edition	Microsoft Windows
2017	Bubsy: The Woolies Strike Back	Microsoft Windows, PlayStation 4
2018	Giana Sisters: Twisted Dreams – Owltimate Edition	Nintendo Switch
2018	Titan Quest	Microsoft Windows, PlayStation 4, Xbox One
2019	Fade to Silence	Microsoft Windows, PlayStation 4, Xbox One
2020	Destroy All Humans!	Microsoft Windows, PlayStation 4, Stadia, Xbox One
2021	Destroy All Humans!	Nintendo Switch
2022	Destroy All Humans! Clone Carnage	Microsoft Windows, PlayStation 4, Xbox One
2022	Destroy All Humans! 2: Reprobed	Microsoft Windows, PlayStation 5, Xbox Series X/S
2023	Destroy All Humans! 2: Reprobed	PlayStation 4, Xbox One

=== Cancelled games ===
Title	Platform(s)
Teenage Mutant Ninja Turtles: The Last Ronin	Microsoft Windows, PlayStation 5, Xbox Series X/S
