= Destroy All Humans! 2: Reprobed =

2022 remake of the 2006 video game

- Developer: Black Forest Games (Note: Original game developed by Pandemic Studios)
- Publisher: THQ Nordic
- Directors: Adrian Goersch; Andreas Speer; Onurhan Karaagacli; Jean-Marc Haessig
- Producers: Ana Correa; Bernard Janssens; Dennis Schiefer; Jim Howard
- Designer: André Beccu
- Programmer: Johannes Conradie
- Artist: Eric Urocki
- Writers: Hans-Jörg Knabel; Maria Clevy
- Composers: Garry Schyman; Daniel Pharos
- Series: Destroy All Humans!
- Engine: Unreal Engine 4
- Platforms: PlayStation 5; Windows; Xbox Series X/S; PlayStation 4; Xbox One; Nintendo Switch 2
- Release: PS5, Windows, Xbox Series X/S; 30 August 2022; PS4, Xbox One; 27 June 2023; Nintendo Switch 2; 15 September 2026
- Genre: Action-adventure
- Modes: Single-player, multiplayer

Destroy All Humans! 2: Reprobed is a 2022 action-adventure video game developed by Black Forest Games and published by THQ Nordic. It is a remake of the 2006 original game, the sequel to the remake of Destroy All Humans!, and the sixth installment in the Destroy All Humans! franchise.

In Destroy All Humans! 2: Reprobed, players assume the role of the grey alien Crypto as he travels to various locations in an open world, including England, Japan, Russia, and the United States, to complete missions and defeat human enemies. It features a variety of weapons and abilities that players can use to defeat enemies, including the ability to mind-control humans and pilot a flying saucer.

Destroy All Humans! 2: Reprobed was released for PlayStation 5, Windows, and Xbox Series X/S on 30 August 2022. A Nintendo Switch 2 port followed on 15 September 2026. It received mixed reviews from critics. A single-player-only version of the game was released for PlayStation 4 and Xbox One on 27 June 2023.

== Gameplay ==
Destroy All Humans! 2: Reprobed is played from a third-person perspective. It is an action-adventure game that involves both shooting and stealth elements. As players progress throughout the game, new weapons, new abilities, better stats, and access to new vehicles are unlocked. The game is set across five locations: Bay City, Albion, Takoshima, Tunguska, and the Solaris moon base (some of which are parodies of real-life locations such as San Francisco, London, and Tokyo). Several of these locations have been expanded in size from the original game, adding new areas to explore.

The game's campaign is fully playable in both single-player and two-player local split-screen co-op.

== Release ==
Destroy All Humans! 2: Reprobed was released for PlayStation 5, Windows, and Xbox Series X/S on 30 August 2022. The game launched with a physical collector's edition, entitled the Second Coming Edition, limited to 3,700 copies. A single-player-only version of the game was released for PlayStation 4 and Xbox One on 27 June 2023.

== Reception ==
Reception

Aggregate scores
Aggregator	Score
Metacritic	(PC) 72/100 (PS5) 67/100 (XSXS) 72/100
OpenCritic	41% recommend

Review score
Publication	Score
IGN	6/10

Destroy All Humans! 2: Reprobed received "mixed or average" reviews from critics, according to review aggregator website Metacritic. IGN said it remains a "fairly unambitious sequel".
