= Destroy All Humans! Big Willy Unleashed =

2008 video game

- Developer: Locomotive Games
- Publisher: THQ
- Director: Matthew Winalski
- Producer: Ken Allen
- Designer: Sean Hyde-Moyer
- Programmer: Lee Marshall
- Artist: Ken Proudfoot
- Writers: Micah Wright; Jay Lender
- Composer: Garry Schyman
- Series: Destroy All Humans!
- Platform: Wii
- Release: NA: February 25, 2008; AU: March 6, 2008; EU: March 7, 2008
- Genre: Action-adventure
- Modes: Single-player, multiplayer

Destroy All Humans! Big Willy Unleashed is a 2008 action-adventure video game developed by Locomotive Games and published by THQ for the Wii and is the third installment in the Destroy All Humans! franchise. A PlayStation 2 version was originally going to be released alongside the Wii, but was ultimately canceled because of budget cuts. A PlayStation Portable version was also canceled, due to "control issues" involved with translating the Wii version's controls to the port.

== Plot ==
Big Willy Unleashed takes place after Destroy All Humans 2 and before Path of the Furon. This game is set during year 1975 (6 years after these events of Destroy All Humans! 2). Cryptosporidium 138 and his mentor, Orthopox 13, attempt to support the popularity of Big Willy, a fast food restaurant Orthopox owns. Pox reveals that the Big Willy food franchise is actually a scheme to dispose of the human bodies Crypto leaves lying around.

=== Story ===
Crypto and Pox are watching TV in Harbor City and happen upon the evening news. Bill Kincaid, a news reporter, announces that the Big Willy Corporation (a parody of Bob's Big Boy) has opened its five-hundredth restaurant, and that President Huffman has resigned, implying that Crypto gave up on controlling the American government. The news is suddenly interrupted by the missing heiress named Patty Wurst (a parody of Patty Hearst) using a pirated television signal to appear on the channel. She reveals that Big Willy is using human corpses to grind up and feed to the public and that a shipment of meat supply is going to dock at the Harbor to prove her case.

Before Crypto kills Patty Wurst, in the new Big Willy mech, Pox figures out that his actual enemy is Colonel Kluckin (a parody of Colonel Sanders), the owner of a competing fast-food restaurant, and that he might be a threat to the Big Willy franchise. Pox sends Crypto to Fairfield in rural Kentucky, home of the new Big Willy restaurant, to see if he can find a lead to where Kluckin might be hiding. After Crypto lands, Pox notices that a group of roller blade girls skate out of the Big Willy restaurant holding a briefcase. Inside is the secret recipe for the Big Willy fast food. Crypto finds them in the back of an alleyway; he kills all of them except for their leader, Mindy Peters, who manages to hide. She appears in front of Crypto, proclaiming that the Furons and the Big Willy franchise will be brought down. Attacking Crypto, she escapes. Pox informs Crypto that his weapons and jet pack are broken. He returns to the saucer and kills more of the roller blade girls. Afterwards, Crypto body snatches the Corncob King, the boyfriend to Mindy Peters. He meets her at a phone booth, after which he jumps out and electrocutes her. Finally, Pox orders Crypto to destroy all of Fairfield (except for his restaurant) to wipe all traces of their endeavors and head off to the next area.

Pox brings Crypto to Fantasy Atoll, an Island located near Malaysia, as a tactic to beat Colonel Kluckin. There, Crypto meets Mr. Pork, the man who ran the island, and Ratpoo, his servant (both parody of Fantasy Island characters Mr. Roarke and Tatoo). Mr. Pork promises Pox a new body and Pox agrees. Crypto must find parts to build a new body, but it turns out to be a hoax and it blasts Pox somewhere on the other side of the island. Crypto finds the module broken. A Furon Customer Support Representative instructs Crypto on how to repair the damaged HoloPox Unit, Pox is then restored and wants revenge. Crypto hypnotizes Ratpoo, who jumps into the Atoll's active volcano while carrying Pork. To their surprise, Mr. Pork survives and attacks with the Hate Boat, a giant warship. After destroying the hate boat, Pox and Crypto go to Vietmahl to find Colonel Kluckin.

In Vietmahl, Kluckin reveals that he has been gathering the corpses from the war to grind into his own food products and Crypto and Pox confront a traitorous Big Willy employee named Trahn, who turns out to be a double agent with Kluckin. After successfully completing several objectives, including killing Trahn, Crypto climbs inside the Big Willy mech and manages to defeat Kluckin in a robotic rock Vietmahlese temple god. However, upon defeating Kluckin, Pox claims that he's done with fast food. Though angered by Pox abruptly giving up on the restaurant after just defeating Kluckin, Crypto gleefully takes the profits from the restaurant and tells Pox that he will make the business transactions from now on and that has an idea for the money that involves a "little town in Nevada", as the both of them walk off into the distance.

== Gameplay ==
=== Multiplayer ===
In Big Willy Unleashed the player can play co-operative and competitive. In co-operative the goal is to protect Big Willy's restaurant and destroy Kluckin's Kitchen. In competitive mode the player must touch the beacons and kill each other. The player can play two areas in co-op and compete mode.

== Reception ==
Reception

Aggregate score
Aggregator	Score
Metacritic	53/100

Review scores
Publication	Score
1Up.com	C+
Electronic Gaming Monthly	5/10
Eurogamer	3/10
Game Informer	5/10
GamePro	2.5/5
GameRevolution	C
GameSpot	5.5/10
GameSpy	2/5
GameZone	5.5/10
IGN	5.8/10
Nintendo Power	7/10

Destroy All Humans! Big Willy Unleashed received "mixed or average" reviews, according to review aggregator Metacritic.

Many critics criticized the game's graphics, with GameZone stating that "the game looks like a GameCube title with good lighting and visual effects but blocky buildings and character models".

1UP also cited poor multiplayer, saying "multiplayer provides very little content, and what's provided is downright terrible".

Regarding its place in the game's series, IGN stated that "it's still fun to go nuts with the anal probe gun, rip heads off of pedestrians with the giant arms of Big Willy, and chuckle at the campy VO".
