= Human possession in science fiction =

Human possession in science fiction is an extension within science-fiction literature and film of the mythology of human possession found in many cultures throughout human history. Typically, possession in science fiction involves extraterrestrial parasitic organisms that can take control of a human host. During the Cold War era in the western world, this was often a metaphor for the threat of communism.

== Print ==
=== The Puppet Masters (1951) ===
In Robert Heinlein's novel The Puppet Masters, slugs from Titan, the largest of Saturn's moons, can take over human bodies and know everything their hosts know.

=== Animorphs ===
In the Animorphs universe created by author K.A. Applegate, the Yeerks are a parasitic species capable of controlling human beings and compatible other species. Individuals controlled (infested) by Yeerks are known as "Controllers." Yeerks have access to the memories and personalities of their hosts, and can exist undetected by friends and family. The Yeerks are conquerors, and use infestation as a means of infiltration on still-unconquered worlds (such as Terra). Yeerks can relatively easily move from one host to another, and in fact have to leave their hosts regularly (every three days) in order to feed on Kandrona rays.

== Film and television ==
=== Invaders from Mars (1953) ===
In Invaders from Mars, mind-control crystals at the base of the skull enable the Martians to turn their victims into saboteurs.

=== Star Trek ===
In the Star Trek universe, the Trill are a symbiotic pair of species consisting of symbionts and hosts. The Trill Dax is a main character in Star Trek: Deep Space Nine, first joined with Jadzia Dax, then after she is killed, with Ezri Dax. The symbiotic species can also control human beings, but not for extended periods of time (see episode "The Host" of Star Trek: The Next Generation).

=== Stargate ===
In the Stargate universe, the Goa'uld are a parasitic species which can control human beings and other compatible species. The Goa'uld forcibly take hosts, whereas the Tok'ra, though the same species, exist consensually as symbiotic beings with their hosts. Goa'uld have access to the memories and personalities of their hosts, and can exist undetected by friends and family. Goa'uld are often power-hungry and take on the roles of gods from the mythologies of the humans that they infest. Infestation is also used as a means of infiltration or access to information. Goa'uld can move from one host to another, but with some difficulty. Goa'uld also have the ability to kill or torture their hosts.

== See also ==
- Parasitism in fiction
- Supernatural possession
