= Destroy All Humans! (2005 video game) =

- Developer: Pandemic Studios (Note: Mobile version developed by Big Blue Bubble.)
- Publisher: THQ (Note: Mobile version published by THQ Wireless.)
- Director: Brad Welch
- Producer: Gordon Moyes
- Programmer: Adam Iarossi
- Artist: Fiona François
- Writer: Tom Abernathy
- Composer: Garry Schyman
- Series: Destroy All Humans!
- Platforms: PlayStation 2 PlayStation 4 Xbox; Mobile phone
- Release: PlayStation 2, Xbox: NA: June 21, 2005; EU/AU: June 24, 2005; Mobile: NA: August 24, 2005
- Genre: Action-adventure
- Mode: Single-player

Destroy All Humans! is a 2005 action-adventure video game developed by Pandemic Studios and published by THQ for PlayStation 2, Xbox, and mobile phones. The game is the first installment in the Destroy All Humans! franchise, and is set in 1959 in the United States, and parodies the lifestyles, pop culture, and political attitudes of this time period. The player controls Cryptosporidium 137 (a reference to the protozoan parasite Cryptosporidium), a member of a fictional alien race called "Furons", and is a Furon spy hitman invading Earth to harvest DNA from humans to continue the cloning process of his species. Destroy All Humans! received generally positive reviews from critics. The original was ported to PlayStation 4 in 2016 alongside its sequel. A remake of the game was released in 2020.

== Synopsis ==
=== Setting ===
Destroy All Humans! is set in the United States in the late 1950s and consists of six settings; Turnipseed Farm (a Southern farm community in Tennessee), Rockwell (a Nebraska town), Santa Modesta (a parody of Santa Monica), Area 42 (a parody of Area 51 but based in New Mexico instead), Union Town (an Eastern seaboard industrial city loosely inspired by Norfolk) and Capitol City (a parody of Washington, D.C.). All buildings and structures in these environments can be destroyed (save for trees and rocks), and humans can become alarmed by Crypto's presence at these locations. While some run or hide, others are armed and fight back. An alert system, much like Grand Theft Auto's "wanted level," denotes how much attention Crypto has attracted. Depending on the alert level, police, military, and eventually the Majestic will attempt to defend civilians from Crypto.

Neutral NPCs frequently refer to pop culture of the 1950s, such as the Edsel, Marilyn Monroe, and 'Ike' Dwight D. Eisenhower when scanned by Crypto. In keeping with the Cold War setting, hostile NPCs refer to Crypto as a 'commie' with his various actions covered up in news stories as communist attacks.

Military technology in the game is depicted as being far more advanced than it actually was in the 1950s, with the US Army having possession of sentry guns, automated anti-air batteries, gigantic, ultra-radioactive tesla coils, and mechanized walkers. The Majestic group also seems to be equipped with energy weapons and reverse-engineered Furon technology.

The hub of the game is the Furon mothership in orbit around Earth, which vaguely resembles the Alien mothership from Close Encounters of the Third Kind. From there, players can receive missions, upgrade weapons, and view unlocked content. This is also the portal to each of the game's Earth settings.

=== Characters ===
Furons: Coming from the planet Furon, mistaken for Gorta in 'Destroy All Humans!' by the Majestic, in the Proxima Centauri system. Pox corrects the planet's name in 'Destroy All Humans! Path of the Furon'. The Furons are aliens with a similar appearance to the Greys, aside from having mouths full of sharp teeth. Furons are named after diseases (such as Orthopox and Cryptosporidium) and are a highly advanced race who use their technology for harsh, unsympathetic science and vicious war. Unregulated atomic weaponry caused a fatal mutation in the Furon race whereby they could no longer reproduce due to their lack of genitalia. Using their advanced biotechnology, they began cloning themselves, rendering each Furon virtually immortal, memories and personalities being technologically transferred to each new clone. However, with each new clone errors appeared in the genetic material, leading to unpredictable results. Without an infusion of uncorrupted Furon D.N.A., they will clone themselves into extinction.

=== Plot ===
The game starts in 1959 with a Furon, Cryptosporidium-136, hovering over a launch site with military personnel testing a rocket. The rocket is launched and destroys the ship carrying Crypto-136; he collapses fatally injured, as the U.S. Army surround him. Sometime later, Cryptosporidium-137 travels to Earth with another Furon, Orthopox-13. Cryptosporidium (nicknamed 'Crypto') comes intending to rescue 136, while Orthopox (nicknamed "Pox") desires to extract human brain stems for study. Crypto arrives at Turnipseed Farm in the Southern United States, where Pox mistakes cows for Earth's dominant life form. The Majestic agency is alerted to the Furon presence when Crypto decimates an army brigade passing through the area. Pox, communicating with Crypto through a hologram-like device, then reveals to Crypto that the reason he requires human brain stems is because they contain pure Furon D.N.A. handed down to them by Furon scouts eons ago when the Furons stopped on Earth for "shore leave" following a war with Mars, which was rendered uninhabitable by the Furon Empire.

Crypto using telekinesis on a police vehicle

After several missions in the Midwestern town of Rockwell and the California suburb of Santa Modesta, Crypto and Pox become aware of the Majestic and begin crippling government attempts to stop them by performing acts such as destroying Area 42 with an atomic bomb and defeating his recurring foe, Armquist, the head of the army. Throughout the game, Crypto's various acts are covered up by the government and media, which attribute them either to freak accidents or to Communism.

After being temporarily captured in Union Town, the game climaxes in Capitol City, where Crypto assassinates President Huffman and slaughters all members of Congress. Soon, the U.S. government seemingly surrenders to the Furons. Crypto meets Silhouette, the leader of Majestic, in front of the Capitol. After a brief scuffle with Silhouette, Crypto discovers that "he" is a woman. Silhouette unveils the Robo-Prez, a towering mech controlled by President Huffman's brain. Crypto defeats Robo-Prez in his flying saucer and then defeats Silhouette in a final battle at the Octagon. In her dying breath, Silhouette reveals that there are other Majestic divisions worldwide. Crypto, however, is confident that without Silhouette's leadership, Majestic will be totally powerless to resist the Furon takeover.

The game ends with Huffman making a televised speech, assuring America that the recent events were the work of communists, who have poisoned the U.S. water supply, and that, as a result, testing centers have been set up all across the country to scan people for harmful toxins. People are then shown being herded reluctantly by Army soldiers into strange machines, clearly for brain stem extraction, and Huffman is revealed to be Crypto in disguise.

== Gameplay ==
In Destroy All Humans!, players assume the role of Cryptosporidium 137 (Crypto for short), a warrior and member of the Furons, a race of war-like extraterrestrials with a large empire constantly seizing new worlds through conquest. After centuries of warfare against inferior species using unchecked nuclear weaponry left their species impotent and without genitalia, the Furons were unable to sexually reproduce and became forced to turn to cloning as a means of reproduction, as well as a process by which to achieve immortality. However, after generations of clones, the Furon DNA is degrading, and each clone is becoming less and less stable.

Fortunately for the Furons, one of their scout ships came across Earth many millennia ago while returning from the conquest of Mars. The Furon space travelers impregnated the "nubile" ancestors of the human race to "let off a little steam", inserting a strand of Furon DNA into the human gene pool.

Because of this, each human contains a small amount of Furon DNA in these genetic codes. Crypto is sent to Earth to harvest this DNA from human brain stems, locate and rescue his previous clone, Cryptosporidium-136, and spearhead a Furon invasion of Earth. The game is set up in a sandbox fashion. The player has a selection of weapons and mental abilities at their disposal, as well as access to Crypto's flying saucer. Destroy All Humans! implements the Havok physics engine, allowing for ragdoll effects on bodies and destructible environments.

=== Weapons and abilities ===
Crypto destroying a department store while piloting an unidentified flying object attack aircraft

Crypto possesses advanced Furon weaponry in both his flying saucer and also on foot.

The saucer is equipped with a Death Ray, which can burn humans, vehicles, and buildings; the "Abducto Beam", a tractor ray that can lift up people and objects and hurl them into the air, and can capture people, as an alien abduction; the Quantum Deconstructor, a highly powerful nuclear weapon that can launch radioactive bombs that utterly destroy anything in this radius that detonates at, and the "Sonic Boom", a bomb that can explode on contact and shock the blast radius like a tremor.

On foot, Crypto has an arsenal of four weapons, of which include the Zap-O-Matic, a gun that emits an electric charge, shocking its victims; the Anal Probe, a powerful rod that goes into the victim's rectum and uproots a DNA-enriched brain: the Disintegrator Ray, which turns the target's flesh and organs into ashes and renders only a charred skeleton; and the Ion Detonator, the Furon equivalent of a grenade launcher. He also is equipped with an upgradable jet pack to help him traverse long distances.

The Furons have a psychokinetic ability nicknamed HoloBob to imitate the appearance of any nearby human. This allows a Furon to travel amongst humans unnoticed. The HoloBob requires PSI energy, called "concentration" in the game, which can be continually replenished by reading the thoughts of unknowing humans or other animals. This disguise is not without flaw, as the Majestic have the ability to see through and destroy the disguise. Crypto will flash red when near a Majestic agent; if he comes too close, the disguise will vanish. Additionally, he is able to use an ability known as PK or PsychoKinesis that allows one to psychokinetically move objects around.

== Development ==
The game was conceived of by Matt Harding while he was working at Pandemic Studios, as after Microsoft rejected the more family-friendly game concept Oddballs, he jokingly suggested "a game where you kill everyone", suggesting the title Destroy All Humans. Being a science fiction fan, Harding even thought of using the concept of playing as an alien invader, something that he had not seen in a video game and served as a "premise for getting to do mindless destruction that makes sense". Harding never worked on the game, feeling he lacked the "energy or interest" to "spend two years of [his] life writing a game about killing everyone". He even contested why along with the on-foot action resembling Grand Theft Auto, there were flying saucer missions - "If you’ve got a spaceship, why would you ever get out?" - but pushed for a satirical game, something the rest of Pandemic embraced by taking the game on a comedic approach. Harding left soon after on his Asian walkabout and began recording some of the footage that eventually became the "Where The Hell Is Matt?" videos. The game also sponsored ECW One Night Stand.

== Reception ==
Reception

Aggregate score
Aggregator	Score
Metacritic	(Xbox) 76/100 (PS2) 74/100

Review scores
Publication	Score
Electronic Gaming Monthly	7/10
Eurogamer	7/10
Game Informer	8/10
GamePro	4.5/5
GameRevolution	C+
GameSpot	7.5/10
GameSpy	4/5
GameTrailers	7.8/10
GameZone	(Xbox) 7.7/10 (PS2) 7.4/10
IGN	7/10
Official U.S. PlayStation Magazine	3/5
Official Xbox Magazine (US)	8.5/10
Detroit Free Press	3/4
Maxim	8/10

Destroy All Humans! received "generally positive" reviews, according to review aggregator Metacritic.

GameZone enjoyed the depth of destruction: "The levels themselves have the potential for a lot of damage". IGN praised the presentation of the game, stating as "Phenomenal. Good behind the scenes extras. Great cutscenes. Excellent layout. Really, nicely done", but they thought the game could use a more in-depth stealth aspect: "As it happens, not developing stealth to its fullest potential turns out to be one part of a greater underlying problem with Destroy All Humans". TeamXbox cited excellent graphics, saying that "Destroy All Humans! is delightful to gaze at".

Maxim gave it a score of eight out of ten and said: "Set up like Grand Theft Alien, there are tons of missions to complete, though you can also just roam around, killing filthy humans and destroying their stuff". The Sydney Morning Herald gave it four stars out of five and said: "The freedom to create chaos is terrific but some missions lack variety". The New York Times also gave it a favorable review, but commented that "it's a shame the gameplay lacks the almost flawless perfection of Destroy All Humans' story and presentation". Detroit Free Press gave it three stars out of four, calling it "goofy fun, and that makes up for a lot of its failings. But I couldn't quite forgive the occasional tedium and fairly short length enough to give it a better rating".

The game sold more than 1 million copies by March 2006.

== Legacy ==
Due to the game's success several sequels have been made: Destroy All Humans! 2, which takes place in the 1960s and marks the first time Crypto invades across the globe, Destroy All Humans! Big Willy Unleashed, a spin-off set in the 1970s in which Pox and Crypto run a fast-food chain, and Destroy All Humans! Path of the Furon, which also takes place in the 1970s and begins with Crypto and Pox running a lucrative gambling casino called the "Space Dust," who work to uncover a conspiracy set on destroying the Furon race.

THQ announced in 2005 that Fox Broadcasting had purchased the rights to the game and was planning a computer-animated comedy, based on the game, to air in prime time. Jim Dauterive, previously of King of the Hill, was to be a writer and executive producer of the TV version of Destroy All Humans!. Nothing has been unveiled since then and the project was presumably canceled. The show is also referenced in Destroy All Humans! 2, in the Salad Days bonus video, in which Pox and Crypto reminisce on the past game, and talk about the possibilities of the game's future.

In 2019, THQ Nordic announced a remake of Destroy All Humans!, set for a release in 2020 for Microsoft Windows, PlayStation 4, and Xbox One. The remake was in development at Black Forest Games and featured content that was cut from the original release. The remake is built in Unreal Engine 4.
