= Destroy All Humans! 2 =

2006 video game

- Developer: Pandemic Studios
- Publisher: THQ
- Director: John Passfield
- Designer: Brad Welch
- Programmer: Chris Swinhoe
- Artist: Shawn Eustace
- Writer: Tom Abernathy
- Composer: Garry Schyman
- Series: Destroy All Humans!
- Platforms: PlayStation 2, Xbox
- Release: NA: October 17, 2006; EU: October 20, 2006; AU: October 26, 2006
- Genre: Action-adventure
- Modes: Single-player, multiplayer

Destroy All Humans! 2 is a 2006 action-adventure video game developed by Pandemic Studios and published by THQ for PlayStation 2 and Xbox. The game is the sequel to Destroy All Humans! and the second installment in the Destroy All Humans! franchise. It also marks the final game in the series to be developed by Pandemic Studios, as the company was later acquired by Electronic Arts in 2007. A remake of the game, titled Destroy All Humans! 2: Reprobed, was initially released in August 2022.

== Plot ==
This game is set during the year 1969 (10 years after the original game) and begins with a Soviet KGB slide show meeting showing that the main character from Destroy All Humans!, Cryptosporidium-137, is suddenly deceased for unknown reasons. His clone, Cryptosporidium-138 (Crypto for short), made of more pure Furon DNA, is now taking his place and continuing to pose as the President of the United States. KGB intelligence reveals that Crypto-138 is the first and only Furon to have genitalia, referred to only as "The Package". Seeing the Furons as a threat to the Soviet Union, the KGB destroy the Furon mothership with a nuclear missile.

Soon after, Crypto's new adventure begins. Not only must Crypto stop the KGB from preventing his and Pox's plans, he desires revenge for the destruction of the mothership. Crypto's commander, Orthopox 13, downloaded his consciousness into a holographic unit (called a HoloPox Unit) just before he died. After saving Bay City from annihilation at the hands of the Soviets, Crypto discovers that the KGB have fled to Albion and promptly follows, where he meets Reginald Ponsonby-Smythe, the James Bond-esque head of M16 (a parody of MI6), and a rogue KGB agent named Natalya Ivanova, to whom Crypto is attracted. They discover that the KGB have created a type of spore that causes humans to mutate into monsters. Eventually, Ponsonby betrays Crypto, revealing he is the leader of the British branch of Majestic, Majestic Sector 16. After killing Ponsonby and puzzling over his cryptic reference that the Furons may not be the only aliens on Earth, Crypto learns that the KGB have a base on Takoshima Island.

Arriving in Takoshima, Crypto has to rescue a person that calls himself Dr. Go (a parody of Julius No) from the Black Ninjas and KGB. He provides access to the KGB base hidden in the island's volcano. Inside Crypto and Natalya are addressed by the mastermind behind the spore plot, Soviet Premier Milenkov (a parody of Ernst Stavro Blofeld). Milenkov shows a film clip of his men using spores on a Takoshimese intern, who transforms into a giant Godzilla-like monster called "Kojira". After defeating Kojira, Crypto follows Natalya to Tunguska, home of "Project Solaris". In the Soviet Union, Crypto discovers that another alien race has crash-landed on Earth, The Blisk. The Blisk are an enemy that the Furons had thought they had wiped out during the Martian War a long time ago. Pox realizes that the Tunguska event of 1908 was actually a downed Blisk warship crash-landing into the Tunguskan hillside and not a meteorite. After destroying the crashed Blisk warship and rescuing Natalya from a Blisk gas bubble, Crypto meets Milenkov face to face. Milenkov then retreats to his Moon base, Solaris, in a Blisk shuttle.

Crypto body-snatching a human

On the Moon, Crypto discovers that Project Solaris is a Blisk superweapon designed to bombard the Earth with Blisk spores and radiation, granting the Blisk control of Earth as their new irradiated, water-logged homeworld. Using his ability to "body snatch", Crypto disguises himself as Soviet cosmonaut Leonid, the head scientist on the Moon, and convinces the rest of the humans to go to war with the Blisk. Then Crypto manages to sabotage the weapon's firing mechanism. Upon doing so, Milenkov confronts Crypto. He then reveals that ever since the Blisk crashed, they have been controlling the Government of the Soviet Union, each Premier before him had been a Blisk, and they were responsible for several world crises; including the Cold War. After their conversation, Milenkov leaves. Crypto and Natalya battle for their various species to save the Earth by attacking and successfully destroying the Blisk Hive Mind with the O.M.G.W.T.F. virus Pox developed in his lab, but Milenkov appears and fatally shoots Natalya in the back. He then reveals his true form, a heavily armored blisk. After defeating Milenkov, Crypto relaxes in his flying saucer while Pox appears on the video monitor, congratulating Crypto and eagerly anticipating his newly cloned body. He has detected activity in the emergency cloning lab. He questions Crypto about it, then realizes that Crypto has cloned Natalya, and is extremely infuriated by this and begins yelling at him, just before Crypto abruptly shuts off the video monitor mid-sentence. Lying next to him, Natalya awakens briefly and favors Crypto with a smile and an invitation to wake her when he's ready for "re-entry". As the game ends, Crypto leers at the player and admits to having made "a few adjustments".

== Gameplay ==
In Destroy All Humans! 2, Crypto is able to go to San Francisco (Bay City), London (Albion), a Japanese island loosely based on Tokyo (Takoshima), Siberia (Tunguska), and the Soviet Moon base Solaris.

Crypto can now body snatch humans, using them as a disguise. New weapons are unlocked by finding data cores ejected from the mothership before it was destroyed. New saucer landing points are unlocked by completing the challenges of the ancient Furon god Arkvoodle. The player is now able to call their saucer from an empty landing site in order to eliminate backtracking, and the UFO can now cloak for limited periods of time. The Abducto Beam now actually abducts humans into the UFO for usage in the Gene Blender, which upgrades Crypto's abilities. In addition, the Jetpack now has a longer-lasting battery. Crypto also gains new abilities: the "Free Love" ability momentarily forces his victims to groove to psychedelic music, thus making them forget they saw him, and the "Mind Flash" ability mentally stuns everyone in the world for a brief period of time.

There are 5 new weapons: the Dislocator, which shoots levitating purple disks that take targets with them; the Meteor Strike, which fires up to 3 meteors at the crosshairs; Gastro--the mother ship's former janitor who, like Pox, uploaded himself into a hologram--who shoots at nearby enemies before self-destructing; the Burrow Beast, which shoots out a lure for a giant space worm to crawl around, eating nearby humans; and the Anti-Gravity Field, which creates a small point of high gravity, pulling anything nearby--including humans--into it before exploding.

Destroy All Humans! 2 has a co-op multiplayer mode, so the player can play through the story mode, free roam, and play minigames--such as PK Tennis and Duel--all alongside a friend.

== Reception ==
Reception

Aggregate score
Aggregator	Score
Metacritic	74/100

Review scores
Publication	Score
1Up.com	B
Electronic Gaming Monthly	7/10
Eurogamer	8/10
Game Informer	8.5/10
GamePro	4.5/5
GameRevolution	C−
GameSpot	7.1/10
GameSpy	4/5
GameTrailers	7.5/10
GameZone	8.3/10
IGN	8/10
Official U.S. PlayStation Magazine	7/10
Official Xbox Magazine (US)	8.5/10
The Sydney Morning Herald	3.5/5
The Times	4/5

Destroy All Humans! 2 received "generally favorable" reviews, according to review aggregator Metacritic.

GameZone stated that "the new weapons and body snatching ability just add more fun to a game with huge open worlds and the plentiful side missions" and that the "game actually supersedes the original".

The AI was criticized by TeamXbox, saying that "every enemy seems as brain dead as Crypto thinks they are".

The Times gave it four stars out of five: "The tone is jocular, the script humorous and well acted by, among others, Little Britain’s Anthony Head". The Sydney Morning Herald gave it three-and-a-half stars out of five and called it "a minor improvement over the original, with just as many silly sci-fi shenanigans".

The game sold over 340,000 copies and had a generated revenue of $13,000,000 in North America alone.

== Remake ==
A remake, Destroy All Humans! 2: Reprobed, was announced on September 17, 2021, for Microsoft Windows, PlayStation 5, and Xbox Series X/S. A multiplayer spin-off, titled Destroy All Humans! Clone Carnage was made available for Microsoft Windows, PlayStation 4, and Xbox One for players who pre-ordered Reprobed starting May 31, 2022.
