= Destroy All Humans! Path of the Furon =

2008 video game

- Developer: Sandblast Games
- Publisher: THQ
- Director: Jon Knoles
- Writers: Micah Wright; Jay Lender
- Composer: Garry Schyman
- Series: Destroy All Humans!
- Engine: Unreal Engine 3
- Platforms: PlayStation 3, Xbox 360
- Release: NA: December 1, 2008 (X360); AU: February 12, 2009; EU: February 13, 2009
- Genre: Action-adventure
- Modes: Single-player, multiplayer

Destroy All Humans! Path of the Furon is an action-adventure video game developed by American studio Sandblast Games and published by THQ. The game is set in the 1970s and is the fourth and final installment in the original Destroy All Humans! franchise. It was released December 1, 2008 in North America for the Xbox 360. Path of the Furon expands on the open world format of the previous Destroy All Humans! games, with five open worlds on the ground and in the air to obliterate with weapons and alien powers.

In November 2008, the North American PlayStation 3 version was canceled citing "development issues". However, the PlayStation 3 version was still released 2009 in Australia on February 12 and Europe on February 13, alongside the Xbox 360 release.

== Gameplay ==
Destroy All Humans! Path of the Furon has over 30-story missions, 20 side quests, and multiplayer modes. As with previous games, most story missions can be played in a non-linear order. Creative director Jon Knoles said that the side quests are related to the story, creative and "epic". Knoles added that the achievements are tied to statistic tracking in the game, and they are unique to the weapons and abilities found, allowing the player to experiment with different possibilities. For example, IGN noted that when the player takes the "Sunny" off of the Sunnywood sign they get a cutscene and one of the more creative achievements. There are also challenges and mini-games that the player can return to repeatedly to better their score and collect more rewards. There are five new open-world locations based on Las Vegas ("Las Paradiso"), Hollywood ("Sunnywood"), Hong Kong ("Shen Long"), Paris ("Belleville"), and the home planet of the Furons itself, The 4th Ring of Furon.

=== Multiplayer ===
This game features split screen offline multiplayer. Most challenges are player versus player, although one is co-op. The maps are scaled down versions of their single-player counterparts. The games are Ion Soccer, where players use their ion detonators to shoot a ball into each other's goals, Brain-O-Matic, where players PK humans into a machine that will extract their brains for processing, and Abductorama, basically a competitive game of "keep away", in which the goal of the game is to abduct the ball, and keep it out of the reach of the other player until the player color fills up the bar, or get the bar filled up more than the other player and keep it like that until time runs out. There are no co-op single-player missions, nor can the player play through the story with co-op.

== Plot ==
After the events of Big Willy Unleashed, Cryptosporidium 138 (Crypto) (J. Grant Albrecht) crashes his old saucer into the Space Dust casino in Las Paradiso while drunk, perishing in the crash. His cohort Orthopox 13 (Pox) (Richard Horvitz) clones Crypto 139, and they take ownership of the casino, which they use to maintain a steady flow of cash and human DNA. They discover that the local mob seeks to gather information on them. Crypto defeats the mob, destroying their profits and taking control of the city.

Soon he begins hearing an etheric voice beckoning him to the path of enlightenment. As Crypto begins to discover the potential of his powers, strange creatures arrive and attack. Pox identifies them as Nexosporidium warriors (Nexos), who are supposedly extinct. In an act of desperation, Pox orders Crypto to destroy all of Paradiso to erase any evidence of their being there. Crypto reluctantly does so, and the pair flee to Sunnywood. In Sunnywood, the duo assume Curt Calvin (Andre Sogliuzzo), leader of the Lunarian Church of Alientology, to be another DNA harvesting Furon on Earth. They stage an alien landing to draw Calvin out. Crypto confronts the cult leader and demands he show his true Furon form. A Nexosporidium walker appears and steps on Calvin, revealing he is actually human. After defeating the walker, Crypto is shot in the neck with a dart and faints.

Crypto converses with The Master.

Crypto awakens days later in a monastery ran by a Furon known as The Master (Darryl Kurylo). He reveals that one hundred years ago imperial traitors marked Emperor Meningitis, ruler of the Furon Empire, for death. He stopped the assassination, but was in turn marked for death. Fleeing to Earth, he crash-landed off the coast of China near the town of Shen Long. Initially intent on retaliating, he soon realized eastern philosophies could help him improve his mental abilities and eventually lost any reason to want revenge, going native and immersing himself in their culture. He built an academy and passed on knowledge to followers. His apprentice, Saxon (James Horan), became power hungry, forming a triad to oppose him. When Crypto next returns to the monastery, he witnesses Saxon kill the Master. He interrogates the villain at gunpoint amidst the sudden appearance of Nexos, and Saxon dies in the confusion. Pox deduces that the Nexos have been cloned on Earth, and only one organization could accomplish such. They then set off for Belleville, France, home of the Francodyne corporation.

Crypto infiltrates the mansion of Francodyne's CEO Henri Crousteau (Michael Lonsdale), but Crousteau escapes. Pox and Crypto learn Crousteau intends to create a virus to destroy the Furon DNA within the human genome. Crypto sets out to destroy his Nexo manufacturing operation. He causes a riot between the workers and destroys the Nexo laboratory. However, Crousteau still manages to create the virus and sends four Nexo walkers to distribute it into the river. Crypto destroys the walkers and defeats Crousteau in a final battle at the Belleville tower. He learns that Crousteau only wanted to destroy his own race to stop the planet from being polluted, that he was feeding the Nexos synthetic DNA, and that he wasn't responsible for the attack on the casino. The Nexos that attacked were rogues responding to a signal from the Furon homeworld. Crypto realizes that Emperor Meningitis (Nolan North) is responsible. He and Pox set off for the Fourth Ring of Furon to confront the emperor.

Upon arriving, Crypto immediately attacks the palace. The emperor expels them from the city and erects a large shield. Pox and Crypto manage to deactivate it and re-enter the city. Pox reveals that since he once worked for the emperor, his biometrics are still in the system, allowing them to open the palace door. Crypto and Pox download Pox's clone data from the imperial repository and clone Pox a new body, Orthopox 14. However the wrong mold is used, and Pox exits the machine with a simian appearance. Pox informs Crypto they'll need a distraction, and to start a human riot in the artificial human habitat. As the riot ensues, Crypto confronts Meningitis, defeating him, but the emperor disintegrates from old age before he can be interrogated.

The Master then reappears from the Jade Talisman Crypto inherited from him, revealing that he was the conspirator who set everything in motion and controlled the Nexos. The Jade Talisman was actually a one-off cloning device used so that after Meningitis was defeated, he could become the new emperor. Crypto becomes infuriated and motions towards Pox to slam The Master against a wall, killing him. Feeling defeated, Crypto tries a canister of synthetic DNA, but vomits at its horrible taste. Pox tells Crypto that as long as synthetic DNA cannot be stomached, their mission wasn't a sham. Crypto realizes that Pox is right, and decides to return to Earth. Pox then tells Crypto he isn't returning with him, and takes the throne. As Crypto walks out of the palace, the other Furons begin running in to greet their new emperor.

== Soundtrack and audio ==
The musical score is performed by composer Garry Schyman. According to the game's creative director, Jon Knoles, there are approximately 15,000 lines of spoken dialogue in the game. There is more back and forth banter between Crypto and Pox, interactive conversations, and more human minds to read. There are between 30 and 50 thoughts for each human in the game and about 2000 in total.

== Reception ==
Reception

Aggregate score
Aggregator	Score
Metacritic	34/100

Review scores
Publication	Score
1Up.com	D
Destructoid	3/10
Edge	3/10
Eurogamer	2/10
Game Informer	4.5/10
GamePro	1.5/5
GameSpot	4/10
GameZone	5/10
IGN	3/10
PlayStation Official Magazine – UK	1/10
Official Xbox Magazine (US)	4.5/10

Destroy All Humans! Path of the Furon received "generally unfavorable" reviews, according to review aggregator Metacritic.

Reviews of the in-game soundtrack fared generally better. GameZone said: "The score still has that sci-fi B-movie feel with a heavy dose of '70s-styled funk and disco tossed in for good measure".
