= Garry Schyman =

American composer

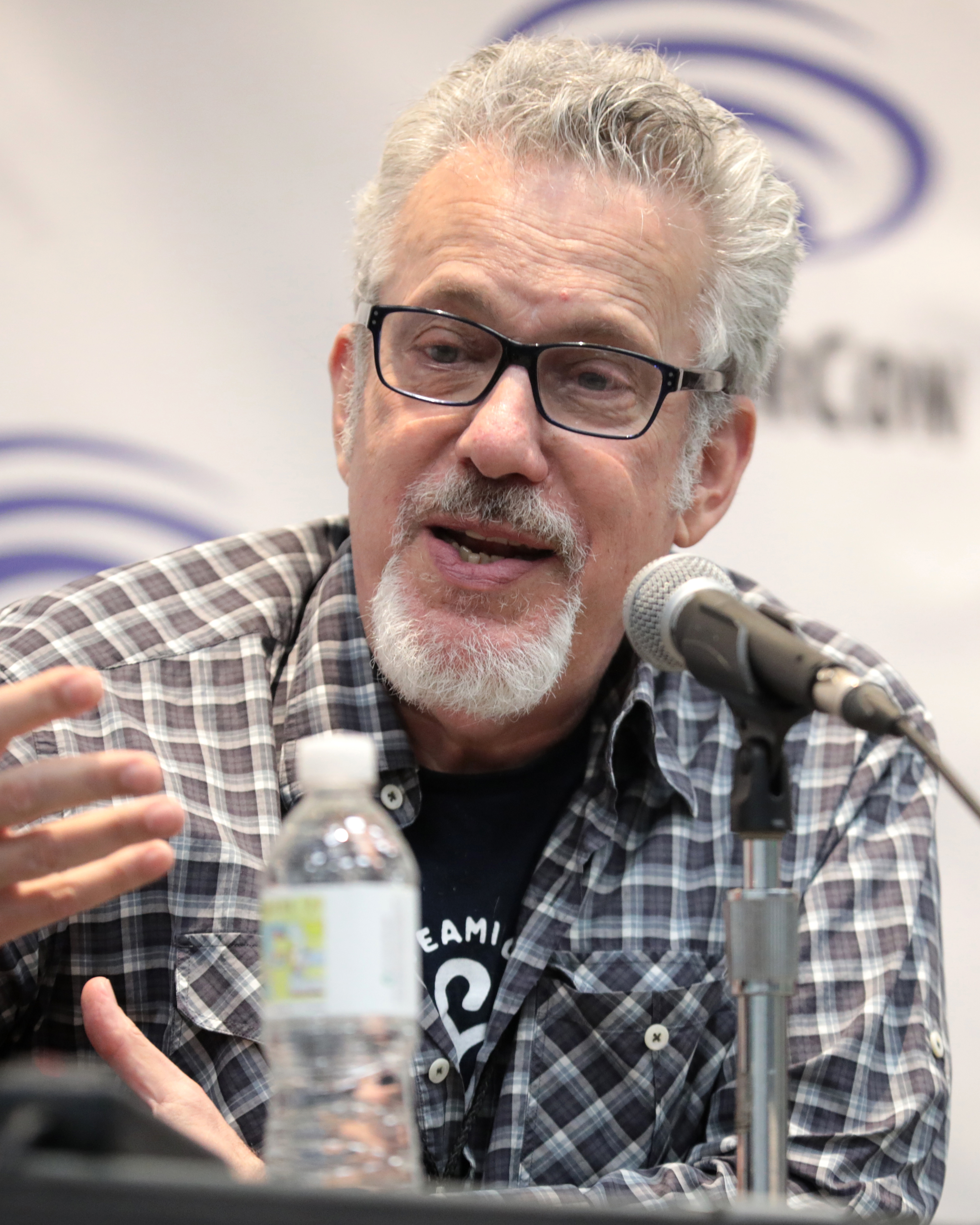
- Schyman at the 2023 WonderCon

Background information
- Born: 1954 (age 71–72); Chicago, Illinois, US
- Genre: Orchestral
- Occupation: Composer
- Years active: 1980–present
- Website: http://www.garryschyman.com

Garry Schyman is an American film, television, and video game music composer. He graduated from the University of Southern California with a degree in music composition in 1978, and began work in the television industry, writing music for television series such as Magnum, P.I. and The A-Team. By 1986, he was composing for movies such as Judgement and Hit List. At the request of a friend in 1993, he composed the music for the video game Voyeur, but after creating the music for two more games he left the industry, citing the low budgets and poor quality of video game music at the time. He continued to compose for film and television, only to return to video games for 2005's Destroy All Humans!. Finding that in his absence the quality and perceived importance of video game music had risen substantially, he has since composed for several games, writing the scores to BioShock and Dante's Inferno among others. He still composes for film however, his latest being Brush with Danger directed by young Indonesian director Livi Zheng. He has won numerous awards for his video game scores, including several "soundtrack of the year" awards. During his career, he has worked on over 25 television shows, 10 films, and 13 video games.

== Biography ==
=== Early life ===
Schyman graduated from the University of Southern California in 1978 with a degree in music composition. He intended to compose music for film and television, going so far as to present two student film scores at his senior recital, which was an unconventional move at the time. Upon graduation, through one of his friends' father, the actor Dennis Weaver, he was invited to watch a recording session for the music of a television show Weaver was working in. There, he met a ghost composer for the show, who in turn told him about a job composing for Lutheran television which he applied for and was hired. He also met the composers Pete Carpenter and Mike Post, the titled composers for the show Weaver had been acting in. They were working on four to five shows each week, and brought him on board as a ghost composer to help them create music for several shows, such as Magnum, P.I. and The Greatest American Hero, for which he is credited for starting in 1980.

=== Career ===
Schyman continued to work in television music composition for the next two decades, working on shows such as The A-Team and Land's End. Beginning in 1986 he also began to compose music for movies such as Never Too Young to Die. Schyman moved into video game composition with Voyeur, released in 1993, after being asked to by his friend Robert Weaver, an executive at Philips, which was creating and publishing the game for its CD-i system. He used a live orchestra to score the game, one of the first video games to do so. The soundtrack won the award for best soundtrack at Cybermania '94. He scored the sequel, released in 1996, and 1995's Off-World Interceptor, but afterward Weaver left the company and the games division of Phillips was shut down. Rather than move to a new video game company, Schyman left the industry and did not return for almost a decade, later stating that he felt that it was "not a very interesting place for composers at that time" as the budgets were low and the technical music quality poor.

After "orchestral work in TV took a nosedive", according to Variety, he returned to the industry in 2005 when THQ approached him to compose the soundtrack to Destroy All Humans! after his agent sent them a demo tape. They offered him a budget large enough for an orchestra and were looking for a style that he found interesting, reminiscent of 1950s movies, and he eagerly accepted the opportunity. The score was appreciated by critics, and was nominated for the Game Audio Network Guild's "Best Original Instrumental Song" and "Music of the Year" awards. Feeling that in his absence the industry had moved towards wanting "strong orchestral music that is iconic and interesting" and that television music was moving towards "ambient music" that he found uninteresting to compose, he went on to compose scores for several more video games since then. He has composed the score for all three Destroy All Humans! games as well as several others such as BioShock and Dante's Inferno. His score for Destroy All Humans! 2 was nominated for the Game Audio Network Guild's "Music of the Year" award, while his score for BioShock won numerous awards, including several soundtrack of the year awards.

In addition to his commercial work, he has written a 15-minute viola concerto entitled "Zingaro", published by Century City Masterworks. He also composed the song "Praan", originally written by Rabindranath Tagore for Matt Harding's "Dancing 2008" viral video, which earned him the "Best Music Video" award at the Hollywood Music Awards, and the song "Trip the Light" (sung by Alicia Lemke) for Matt Harding's "Dancing 2012". Some of Schyman's work from BioShock has been performed by a live orchestra in the Video Games Live international concert tour from 2007 to date. In addition, "Welcome to Rapture" from BioShock was performed by the Metropole Orchestra at the Games in Concert 3 event in Utrecht, The Netherlands on November 15, 2008. In 2010 music from BioShock 2 and Dante's Inferno had their live performance premieres in Sweden with the Malmo symphony orchestra.

== Musical style and influences ==
Though he is not opposed to doing work on TV or film scores, Schyman currently prefers to compose music for video games as he feels video game soundtracks give him more freedom and a greater technical challenge. He has said that the video games industry is filled with "nice people whose egos were in check", which was not always his experience in the film and television industries. However, he feels that his television and film career has been "a great experience" and he "still love[s] scoring film and TV". He names his favorite composer "at the moment" as Gustav Mahler, and some of his favorite music as that from artists such as Prokofiev and Bartók. He enjoys music from the early to mid-20th century, and finds that it influences many of his scores, such as the ones to BioShock and Dante's Inferno.

When he first started composing, Schyman scored his music by playing it on the piano without the aid of computers, but now he composes digitally using Digital Performer and "the latest technology". He considers himself to be a "very intuitive composer", in that he has "something in my mind's ear that I want to achieve" and improvises until the music he is creating matches up with it. He finds that the hardest part of composing for a project is finding the basic concept for the music that he wants to use, rather than composing any of the individual pieces. Although he has written a concerto, Schyman does not regularly compose "art music" pieces, as he finds his commercial work to be "satisfying music from a creative standpoint".

== Works ==
=== Television ===
- Magnum, P.I. (1980)
- Father Murphy (1981)
- The Greatest American Hero (1981)
- Tales of the Gold Monkey (1982)
- This Is the Life (1983)
- The A-Team (1983)
- Yeshua (1984)
- Rags to Riches (1987)
- The Great Gondoli (1987)
- Buck James (1987)
- Assassin (1989)
- The First Valentine (1989)
- Waiting for the Wind (1990)
- Treasure of Lost Creek (1992)
- Revenge of the Nerds III: The Next Generation (1992)
- Trade Winds (1993)
- Day of Reckoning (1994)
- Revenge of the Nerds IV: Nerds in Love (1994)
- Mortal Fear (1994)
- Land's End (1995)
- Deadly Invasion: The Killer Bee Nightmare (1995)
- Virus (1996)
- Terminal (1996)
- Tornado! (1996)
- NightScream (1997)
- The Napoleon Murder Mystery (2000)
- Ringling Bros. Revealed: The Greatest Show on Earth (2003)

=== Film ===
- Never Too Young to Die (1986)
- Penitentiary III (1987)
- The Magic Boy's Easter (1989)
- Hit List (1989)
- Horseplayer (1990)
- The Last Hour (1991)
- Judgement (1992)
- Lost In Africa (1994)
- Spooky House (2000)
- Race for the Poles (2000)
- Brush with Danger (2014)
- Itsy Bitsy (2019)

=== Video games ===
- Voyeur (1993)
- Off-World Interceptor (1994)
- Voyeur II (1996)
- Destroy All Humans! (2005)
- Full Spectrum Warrior: Ten Hammers (2006)
- Destroy All Humans! 2 (2006)
- BioShock (2007)
- Destroy All Humans! Path of the Furon (2008)
- Resistance: Retribution (2009)
- Dante's Inferno (2010)
- BioShock 2 (2010)
- Front Mission Evolved (2010)
- The Bureau: XCOM Declassified (2013)
- BioShock Infinite (2013)
- BioShock Infinite: Burial at Sea (2014)
- Middle-earth: Shadow of Mordor (2014)
- Middle-earth: Shadow of War (2017)
- Torn (2018)
- Guild Wars 2 (2019)
- Metamorphosis (2020)
- Dota 2 (2022)
- Forspoken (2023)

== Awards ==
Awards
Year	Award	Category	Work	Result
1993	Cybermania Award	Best Original Score	Voyeur	Won
2005	Game Audio Network Guild	Best Original Instrumental Song	Destroy All Humans! ("Main Theme")	Nominated
2005	Game Audio Network Guild	Music of the Year	Destroy All Humans!	Nominated
2006	Game Audio Network Guild	Music of the Year	Destroy All Humans! 2	Nominated
2007	International Film Critics Association	Best Original Score for a Video Game or Interactive Media	BioShock	Nominated
2007	G4 Television Awards	Soundtrack of the Year	BioShock	Won
2007	Game Audio Network Guild	Music of the Year	BioShock	Won
2007	Game Audio Network Guild	Best Interactive Score	BioShock	Won
2007	Game Audio Network Guild	Best Original Instrumental Song	BioShock ("Welcome to Rapture")	Won
2007	Game Audio Network Guild	Audio of the Year	BioShock	Won
2007	Spike Video Game Awards	Best Original Score	BioShock	Won
2008	Interactive Achievement Awards	Outstanding Achievement in Original Music Composition	BioShock	Won
2008	Interactive Achievement Awards	Outstanding Achievement in Soundtrack	BioShock	Nominated
2008	Hollywood Music Award	Best Music Video	"Dancing 2008" ("Praan")	Won
2010	Hollywood Music Award	Best Original Score- Video Game	BioShock 2	Nominated
2010	Game Audio Network Guild	Music of the Year	BioShock 2	Nominated
2010	Game Audio Network Guild	Best Original Soundtrack Album	BioShock 2	Nominated
2014	D.I.C.E. Awards	Outstanding Achievement in Original Music Composition	BioShock Infinite	Won
2014	BAFTA Games Award	Best Original Music	BioShock Infinite	Won
2014	Game Audio Network Guild	Music of the Year	BioShock Infinite	Won
2014	Game Audio Network Guild	Best Original Instrumental	BioShock Infinite ("Lighter Than Air")	Won
2015	BAFTA Games Award	Best Original Music	Middle-earth: Shadow of Mordor	Nominated
2015	Game Audio Network Guild	Music of the Year	Middle-earth: Shadow of Mordor	Nominated
2015	Game Audio Network Guild	Best Interactive Score	BioShock Infinite: Burial At Sea, Part 2	Nominated
2015	Game Audio Network Guild	Best Original Instrumental	Middle-earth: Shadow of Mordor ("Fort Morn")	Nominated
2021	Society of Composers and Lyricists Award	Outstanding Original Score for Interactive Media	Metamorphosis	Won
