= Dark Reign =

Dark Reign may refer to:

== Games ==
- Dark Reign: The Future of War, a 1997 real-time strategy game
- Dark Reign 2, a 2000 real-time strategy game and prequel to the 1997 game

== Comics ==
- Dark Reign (comics), a 2008–2009 Marvel Comics storyline

== See also ==
- "Dark Rain", a 1997 episode of the TV series The Outer Limits
