= Batman Begins (video game) =

2005 video game

- North American cover art
- Developers: Eurocom (GC, PS2, Xbox); Vicarious Visions (GBA); Klear Games (Mobile)
- Publishers: EA Games; Warner Bros. Interactive Entertainment
- Composer: Ian Livingstone
- Series: Batman
- Platforms: Game Boy Advance; GameCube; PlayStation 2; Xbox; Mobile phone
- Release: Consoles: NA: June 15, 2005; EU: June 17, 2005; AU: June 27, 2005; TW: June 15,2005; Mobile: NA: June 20, 2005; UK: July 7, 2005
- Genres: Stealth, action-adventure Action, platform (GBA, mobile)
- Mode: Single-player

Batman Begins is a stealth action-adventure game based on the film of the same name, exploring the first year of Batman's crusade against crime. It was released in June 2005 for the Game Boy Advance, GameCube, PlayStation 2, and Xbox. The console version of the game was developed by Eurocom and co-published by Electronic Arts and Warner Bros. Interactive Entertainment in conjunction with DC Comics. Vicarious Visions developed a distinct version of the game for the Game Boy Advance, and Klear Games adapted the game for mobile phones, with both featuring action-platform gameplay. The film's original cast provided a voice-over reprisal in the game, with the exception of Gary Oldman, who portrays James Gordon in the film and was replaced by Gavin Hammon in the game.

The game received mixed reviews upon release. A PlayStation Portable version was planned but got cancelled for unknown reasons. A sequel, Batman: The Dark Knight, based on the 2008 film of the same name, was developed for the PlayStation 3 and Xbox 360 before being cancelled as well. This made Batman Begins the last Batman film released by Warner Bros. to receive a video game tie-in.

== Gameplay ==
Batman Begins is an action-adventure game incorporating both beat 'em up and stealth elements. The player controls Batman from a third-person perspective, who has access to several gadgets that can be used during both combat and stealth segments. These include batarangs, smoke bombs, flash bang grenades, and a 'High Frequency Transponder', which summons bats to gather around and incapacitate enemies with "fear" (a gameplay mechanic unique to this game).

During stealth segments, the player can interact with the environment to create various circumstances that scare off enemies, such as explosions or dropping crates near them, making them easier to subdue. It is also essential to outsmart armed enemies, especially those with guns, by using the environment to one's advantage; if armed enemies are intimidated, they will drop their firearms. Fear also plays a role in the combat segments, where, if the fear bar is filled, players can finish off the last remaining enemy with a single hit. The overall stealth gameplay is reminiscent of the Splinter Cell series.

Aside from the combat and stealth sections, the game also incorporates several combat racing levels where the player drives the Tumbler. The game features several alternate costumes for Batman to wear, which are unlocked after completing the main story. Aside from the story, there is a "Gallery of Fear", where the player can view various enemies and villains they have encountered throughout the game and read their bios.

== Synopsis ==
The game closely follows the film's plot, albeit with several modifications, such as the introduction of new scenes or expanding upon certain events depicted in the film. The game features over 20 clips from the film that serve as in-game cutscenes between levels.

=== Plot ===
Inside a run-down building full of explosives in Gotham City, Batman confronts a group of thugs working for Dr. Jonathan Crane. The explosives are accidentally triggered during the fight, setting the building on fire. Batman makes his way through the inferno and catches Crane, but he sprays him with a toxin, causing Batman to go psychotic and jump through a window. The game then flashes back to a year prior in the Himalayas, during Bruce Wayne's training with Henri Ducard and the League of Shadows, led by Ra's al Ghul. After refusing to execute a captive criminal as part of his training, Bruce discovers that the League has deemed Gotham beyond saving and is planning to destroy it. To stop them, Bruce sets the League's temple alight and escapes with Ducard, leaving Ra's and the rest of the League to die.

Bruce returns to Gotham, where he intends to fight crime and corruption; he sets up a base in the caves beneath Wayne Manor and becomes the vigilante Batman, inspired by his childhood fear of bats. He is aided in his crusade by his longtime butler Alfred Pennyworth and Wayne Enterprises archivist Lucius Fox, who supplies him with advanced technology. Bruce keeps his Batman identity secret from everyone else, including Rachel Dawes, his childhood sweetheart. A week prior to the game's opening scene, Batman, learning that mob boss Carmine Falcone is involved with a drug shipment at the Gotham Docks, captures Falcone and leaves him for the GCPD to find. He then informs Rachel of the shipment and provides her with enough evidence to enlist Sergeant James Gordon, one of Gotham's few honest cops, to arrest Falcone.

Bruce is later informed by Lucius of the theft of a microwave emitter from Wayne Enterprises and pursues the thieves in his Tumbler, but discovers that they used a decoy to lure him away. Turning his attention back to Falcone's operations, he tracks down Walter Pfister and Gordon's corrupt partner Arnold Flass, who attempts to blackmail psychotic killer Victor Zsasz into telling him about Crane, Falcone's new partner. Batman catches Flass and threatens him into revealing that, besides drugs, Falcone's men are shipping chemicals to Crane, who works at Arkham Asylum. Batman intercepts Crane's latest shipment and follows it to Crane's hideout, leading to the game's opening scene.

Lucius develops an antidote for Crane's fear toxin and cures Bruce of its effects. Meanwhile, Rachel seeks to investigate the connection between Crane and Falcone, who was previously transferred to Arkham after being drugged by Crane. She enters the asylum to question Crane, but ends up being drugged and held captive. Batman infiltrates Arkham and learns that Crane has introduced his toxin into Gotham's water supply; however, Crane discovers his presence and calls the GCPD, who storm the asylum. After subduing and interrogating Crane, who claims to work for Ra's al Ghul, Batman finds Gordon and tells him that Rachel is dying from the toxin's effects. With Gordon's help, Batman sneaks out of the asylum and drives Rachel to the Batcave, where he manages to save her life, but elects to continue keeping his identity secret from her.

Later, during a birthday celebration at Wayne Manor, Bruce is confronted by survivors of the League of Shadows, led by Ducard, who reveals himself as the true Ra's al Ghul. Ra's informs Bruce of his plan to destroy Gotham by vaporizing the city's water supply with the stolen microwave emitter, rendering Crane's fear toxin airborne and plunging the population into mass hysteria. As the League sets Wayne Manor ablaze, Bruce rescues Lucius and escapes with Alfred to the Batcave. Meanwhile, a riot erupts at Arkham Asylum, allowing numerous inmates to escape into the Gotham Narrows where, exposed to Crane's toxin, they descend into violence and chaos. Amidst the turmoil, Batman confronts Crane and prevents him from leading the criminals into the rest of Gotham. During the encounter, Crane is exposed to his own toxin and hallucinates Batman as a terrifying monster, causing him to panic and leap into the river.

Batman then turns his attention to stopping the League's plan, as Ra's loads the microwave emitter onto Gotham's elevated monorail and sets it on a course towards the city's central water hub. Rachel attempts to stop the train from the monorail control station but is attacked by Victor Zsasz. Batman rescues her, inadvertently revealing his identity in the process, and boards the train in a desperate attempt to disable the emitter. After defeating Ra's, he discovers that the device cannot be shut down, so he uses the Tumbler to destroy a section of the monorail track, preventing the train from reaching its destination. Refusing to kill Ra's but equally unwilling to save him, Batman escapes moments before the train crashes, resulting in Ra's death. In the aftermath, order is restored to Gotham, and Batman reflects on his new role as the city's protector.

=== Voice cast ===
- Christian Bale as Bruce Wayne / Batman
- Michael Caine as Alfred Pennyworth
- Liam Neeson as Henri Ducard / Ra's al Ghul
- Katie Holmes as Rachel Dawes
- Gavin Hammon as Sergeant James Gordon
- Cillian Murphy as Dr. Jonathan Crane / Scarecrow
- Tom Wilkinson as Carmine Falcone
- Morgan Freeman as Lucius Fox
- Tim Booth as Victor Zsasz
- Mark Boone Junior as Detective Arnold Flass
- Ken Watanabe as Ra's al Ghul (decoy)

Additionally, Batman Begins producer Emma Thomas and cinematographer Wally Pfister make cameo appearances in the game as an Arkham Asylum doctor and a Falcone mobster, respectively.

== Reception ==
Reception

Aggregate scores
Aggregator	Score
GameRankings	(Xbox) 67.20% (GC) 66.74% (PS2) 65.63% (GBA) 62.14%
Metacritic	(GC) 66/100 (Xbox) 65/100 (PS2) 64/100 (GBA) 61/100

Review scores
Publication	Score
1Up.com	C
Electronic Gaming Monthly	5.33/10
Eurogamer	6/10
Game Informer	7.25/10
GamePro	4/5
GameRevolution	C
GameSpot	6.8/10 (PS2) 6.7/10 (GBA) 5/10
GameSpy	(Xbox) 3.5/5; 3/5
GameTrailers	7/10
GameZone	(GC) 7.2/10 (Xbox) 6.1/10 (PS2) 5.9/10
IGN	(GC) 7.6/10 (GBA) 7/10; 6.8/10
Nintendo Power	(GC) 6.5/10 (GBA) 5.5/10
Official U.S. PlayStation Magazine	3/5
Official Xbox Magazine (US)	5/10

Batman Begins received generally mixed reviews across all platforms. GameRankings gave it a score of 62.14% for the Game Boy Advance version, 66.74% for the GameCube version, 65.63% for the PlayStation 2 version, and 67.20% for the Xbox version. Likewise, Metacritic calculated an average score of 61 out of 100 for the GBA version, 66 out of 100 for the GameCube version, 64 out of 100 for the PS2 version, and 65 out of 100 for the Xbox version. It received G4's award for 'Best Graphics on PS2 and Xbox'.

1Up.com gave the game a C, saying "Begins' big pro is how great it looks, especially the lighting effects, which are contrasted nicely by the dark atmosphere, but I still found myself wishing the game would go the way of the old batsuit nipples and disappear."

The game sold 587,000 copies by 2008.

== Sequels ==
=== Cancelled The Dark Knight game ===
A video game sequel to Batman Begins, based on the second installment of the The Dark Knight film trilogy, was in development. In his interview on GameTrailers, actor Gary Oldman said he knew that a lot of effort had gone into getting Batman's gliding abilities to feel suitably smooth and fluid for the game. Oldman, who reprised his role as Lt. Jim Gordon, did not name a developer in the interview, but anonymous sources reported that The Dark Knight was a secret project of Pandemic Studios and EA. The project was ultimately cancelled, and Pandemic Brisbane was shut down.

=== The Dark Knight Rises game ===
A game adaptation of The Dark Knight Rises was released for mobile devices in July 2012. Developed by Gameloft, it is a fully 3D action role-playing game in which the player controls Batman as he fights enemies in an open-world Gotham City. Batman has access to his arsenal of weapons, gadgets, and vehicles such as the Bat-Pod and the Bat. The game features simple touch controls with a joystick on the left side and context-sensitive action buttons on the right.
