= Batman: The Dark Knight (video game) =

Cancelled video game

- Developer: Pandemic Studios
- Publisher: Electronic Arts
- Series: Batman
- Platforms: PlayStation 3, Xbox 360
- Release: Cancelled
- Genres: Stealth, action
- Mode: Single-player

Batman: The Dark Knight was a cancelled action-stealth game for the PlayStation 3 and Xbox 360 developed by Pandemic Studios from September 2006 until its cancellation in October 2008. It would have been the first open world video game to feature the DC Comics superhero Batman and was based on Christopher Nolan's film The Dark Knight. In Batman: The Dark Knight, the player controlled Batman, who could freely explore Gotham City, drive vehicles, and perform missions. Pandemic was given access to the film's script and other materials, and the film's cast would have reprised their roles for the game.

Pandemic began working on the game before the film's principal photography commenced. Batman: The Dark Knight was initially developed in the same linear style as the 2005 Batman Begins tie-in game, but was retooled when the studio decided an open world approach would better suit Nolan's interpretation of Batman. Development was stalled when Pandemic's staff discovered the underlying technology desired to create the game was incompatible with most assets. Publisher Electronic Arts (EA) chose to cancel the game when it could not reach its intended December 2008 deadline.

EA reportedly missed US$100 million in potential revenue for not releasing a Dark Knight video game. The publisher did not renew its license for the Batman intellectual property afterwards. The rights reverted to Warner Bros. Interactive Entertainment, which went on to release the critically acclaimed Batman: Arkham series. Batman: The Dark Knight was kept a secret during its development cycle; Gary Oldman made the only public mention of it during production. Since the game's cancellation, numerous video game journalists have retrospectively considered its potential.

== Premise ==
Batman: The Dark Knight was an action-stealth game in which the player controlled the DC Comics superhero Batman. Based on Christopher Nolan's 2008 film The Dark Knight, it would have been a sequel to the 2005 game Batman Begins. The story closely followed that of the film's and the cast was signed on to voice their respective characters for the game. The film's distributor, Warner Bros., provided developer Pandemic Studios with the script, concept art, and other materials to assist.

The game's earliest prototypes closely followed Batman Begins's gameplay approach as a linear action game. However, later versions placed Batman in an open world version of Gotham City which he could freely explore. Batman could traverse on foot, drive the Batmobile or Batpod, or glide through the air. The player could also perform missions. Batman: The Dark Knight would have been the first open world Batman game, preceding Batman: Arkham City (2011).

== Development ==
Elevation Partners acquired the license for a video game based on The Dark Knight shortly after it was green-lit by Warner Bros. It outsourced development to Pandemic Studios, known for Star Wars: Battlefront, Destroy All Humans!, and Mercenaries; Pandemic's management assigned production to its Brisbane branch. Electronic Arts (EA), which had previously published the Batman Begins tie-in game, was to publish Batman: The Dark Knight. Planning for Batman: The Dark Knight began in September 2006, before principal photography for the film. After the completion of Destroy All Humans! 2, Pandemic was split into two groups, with team "Alpha" working on a racing video game for the Wii and team "Bravo" working on Batman: The Dark Knight, which was intended to release on the PlayStation 3 and Xbox 360. EA's license to Batman video games was valid for 18 months and would expire in December 2008.

Pandemic began to produce the game before they had been given any material about the film. The first prototypes for the game were created on the PlayStation 2 because the studio had not yet decided which game engine The Dark Knight would use. The first work done for the game was the creation of Gotham City and the physics for Batman's gliding ability. The initial gameplay was linear, similar to the Batman Begins game. Most of their effort went into designing the graphical style and environments that would mimic the look and feel of Batman Begins. One of Elevation Partners' cofounders — singer and Batman fan Bono, who was on tour with U2 — visited Brisbane during this stage of development. Though he was shown an early and basic build, Bono was very impressed and enthusiastic about the amount of effort that had gone into the game.

As the Brisbane branch of Pandemic worked on Batman: The Dark Knight, Pandemic's office in Los Angeles had been working on a new game engine, Odin. It was created during the development of The Saboteur (2009) and designed for detailed open world games. Pandemic decided an open world approach would suit Nolan's interpretation of Batman's world better than a linear one. By the end of 2007, Batman: The Dark Knight's assets were being transferred into Odin. This caused unforeseen technical problems and devastated development. Troubles began when Batman's model was imported; attempts to control him caused the frame rate to drop to five frames per second (FPS). Importing more characters caused the performance to get worse and caused many development kits to crash.

These problems were unexpected and it was not possible for the staff to have the game ready for release alongside the film as had been intended. Several team members quit as a result. Shortly after this, EA acquired Elevation Partners and delayed Batman: The Dark Knight's release to December to coincide with the film's release on home media. Pandemic used the extra time to make the game playable, but missions suffered from software bugs and the slowdown was unresolved. Most of the frame rate problems came from the game's lighting system, which had to be manually altered after a change was made to the environment. Other problems arose from the level design tools not being available for six months and management making decisions that had to be reversed.

EA and Pandemic attempted to keep Batman: The Dark Knight a secret, but Gary Oldman, who played Jim Gordon in the film, revealed the game was in development during an interview with G4. At one point in development, Oldman visited Brisbane to view the progress and was shown a build of Batman gliding over a city and Gordon using the Bat-Signal. When asked about a potential Dark Knight game in an interview, Oldman explained what he had been shown, unaware it was supposed to be a secret. The resulting news coverage by video game journalists put a considerable amount of pressure on Pandemic to finish the game, and EA expanded the development team to over 100 members. This was not enough to save the game, and EA canceled it in October 2008.

== Aftermath ==
With the absence of a Dark Knight game, EA reportedly missed US$100 million in potential revenue. The Brisbane branch of Pandemic was shut down shortly after the Batman: The Dark Knight debacle in February 2009; some staff moved to Los Angeles to finish The Saboteur. The studio was closed entirely in November the same year. EA did not renew its license, so the video game rights to the Batman intellectual property reverted to Warner Bros. Interactive Entertainment afterwards. Warner Bros. eventually released the critically acclaimed Batman: Arkham series, which featured an open world gameplay style. Although a Dark Knight video game was never released, an expansion pack for Lego Batman 3: Beyond Gotham (2014) contains levels based on the film, and Batman's suit from the film is available as downloadable content for Batman: Arkham Knight (2015) and the Lego Batman: Legacy of the Dark Knight (2026) is inspired by the film.

Batman: The Dark Knight was never formally announced. Rumors of its existence surfaced in May 2007, but before Oldman stated it was in development, video game journalists speculated why no video game adaptation of The Dark Knight had been announced. Inverse wrote the absence of an adaptation was unusual: "In the late-aughts, it was pretty much guaranteed any superhero or animated family movie would have a video game tie-in that would capitalize on release... anyone would have snatched up a licensed videogame [sic] of The Dark Knight, one of the rare cultural events that actually surpassed the critical mass hype".

In January 2009, Kotaku published a series of articles about the game's development cycle based on information from a Pandemic insider. Further information was revealed in February 2016, when Did You Know Gaming? dedicated an episode of its series Unseen64 to Batman: The Dark Knight, showcasing gameplay footage from prototypes and concept artwork. These revelations have elicited commentary on the game's potential. The Escapist wrote the game showed a lot of promise for a licensed property, considering Pandemic had built a reputation for making quality games. Reacting to the Unseen64 episode, GamesRadar+ thought it was interesting to see what a Dark Knight game could have been like, and GameSpot called its cancellation unfortunate.
