= Pandemic Studios =

American video game developer

Pandemic Studios, LLC
- Company type: Subsidiary
- Industry: Video games
- Founded: 1998; 28 years ago
- Founders: Andrew Goldman; Josh Resnick
- Defunct: November 17, 2009
- Fate: Dissolved
- Headquarters: Westwood, Los Angeles, US
- Key people: Andrew Goldman (CEO); Josh Resnick (president)
- Products: Full Spectrum Warrior series; Star Wars: Battlefront series; Destroy All Humans! series; Mercenaries series
- Number of employees: 200+ (2009)
- Parent: VG Holding Corp. (2005–2007); Electronic Arts (2007–2009)

Pandemic Studios, LLC was an American video game developer based in Westwood, Los Angeles. Andrew Goldman and Josh Resnick founded the studio in 1998 after leaving Activision. Pandemic Studios, alongside BioWare, was acquired in 2005 by Elevation Partners and placed under VG Holding Corp., which in 2007 was sold to Electronic Arts (EA). EA closed Pandemic Studios in 2009. Pandemic Studios is known for a variety of titles, including Full Spectrum Warrior, Star Wars: Battlefront, Dark Reign 2, Destroy All Humans!, Mercenaries, and The Saboteur.

== History ==
Pandemic was formed in 1998 by president Josh Resnick and CEO Andrew Goldman, both formerly of Activision, along with most of the original team members that worked on Battlezone and Dark Reign: The Future of War. The studio was founded with an undisclosed equity investment by Activision. The company name was narrowed down from around six choices, including Seismic. In the end, Pandemic was chosen as the name. Pandemic's first two games, Battlezone II and Dark Reign 2, were both sequels to the aforementioned games for Activision.

In 2000, Pandemic opened a development studio in Brisbane, Australia, within the suburb of Fortitude Valley, whose first project was Army Men: RTS, a real-time strategy console game using the Dark Reign 2 engine. Destroy All Humans! was the studio's next game. In 2003, the Los Angeles studio moved from its founding location at Santa Monica to a high-rise building in Westwood.

In November 2005, a partnership was announced between Pandemic and Canada's BioWare, with private equity fund Elevation Partners investing in the partnership. Both companies retained their brands and identities. On October 11, 2007, it was announced that VG Holding Corp., BioWare and Pandemic's owner, would be acquired by Electronic Arts as of January 2008, subject to FTC approval.

In February 2009, the Brisbane office was shut down. Nine months later, in November, EA cut a total of 1,500 jobs, which affected various studios, including Pandemic. On November 17, EA officially confirmed Pandemic's closure, laying off 228 employees. The company absorbed 35 Pandemic employees into its EA Los Angeles studio to support The Saboteur and an unannounced project which was later revealed to be Mercs Inc, a sequel to the Mercenaries series. In response, four former employees of the studio created an Office Space-style video, where they are shown smashing their office printer.

Over a dozen former Pandemic developers are now employed at 343 Industries having worked on Halo: Combat Evolved Anniversary and Halo 4. Other former employees have gone to work for Infinity Ward, Treyarch, Respawn Entertainment (who EA would later acquire in 2017), Blendo Games and many others.

== Technology ==
Zero is the common name for the evolution of the proprietary game engine created by Pandemic Studios. It was used first in the game Battlezone II: Combat Commander and later used in several Star Wars games including the popular Battlefront series. Battlezone II: Combat Commander and Dark Reign 2 both feature an in-engine editor accessible via commands. It was given additional 3D functionality with Dark Reign 2, which was further improved upon for Army Men: RTS.

The engine was revamped for Star Wars: The Clone Wars to accommodate consoles and third person gameplay. The engine was again retooled for Star Wars: Battlefront and the level editor was made a separate entity from the game engine. A set of modding tools including ZeroEdit, the new level creation tool, were released for use with Star Wars: Battlefront on December 23, 2004. An updated version of the tools were released on February 2, 2006 for Star Wars: Battlefront II. Pandemic used Zero as their primary engine for several of their games developed in their Los Angeles, California studio. Havok physics engine capabilities were integrated with Zero for Mercenaries: Playground of Destruction. A new engine was built for 2008's Mercenaries 2: World in Flames.

== Games developed ==
| Year | Title | Platform(s) |
|---|---|---|
| 1999 | Battlezone II: Combat Commander | Microsoft Windows |
| 2000 | Dark Reign 2 | Microsoft Windows |
| 2002 | Triple Play 2002 | PlayStation 2, Xbox |
| 2002 | Army Men: RTS | Microsoft Windows, PlayStation 2, GameCube |
| 2002 | Star Wars: The Clone Wars | GameCube, PlayStation 2, Xbox |
| 2004 | Full Spectrum Warrior | Xbox, Microsoft Windows, PlayStation 2 |
| 2004 | Star Wars: Battlefront | Microsoft Windows, PlayStation 2, Xbox, macOS |
| 2005 | Mercenaries: Playground of Destruction | PlayStation 2, Xbox |
| 2005 | Destroy All Humans! | PlayStation 2, Xbox |
| 2005 | Star Wars: Battlefront II | Microsoft Windows, PlayStation 2, PlayStation Portable, Xbox |
| 2006 | Full Spectrum Warrior: Ten Hammers | Microsoft Windows, PlayStation 2, Xbox |
| 2006 | Destroy All Humans! 2 | PlayStation 2, Xbox |
| 2008 | Mercenaries 2: World in Flames | Microsoft Windows, PlayStation 2, PlayStation 3, Xbox 360 |
| 2009 | The Lord of the Rings: Conquest | Microsoft Windows, Nintendo DS, PlayStation 3, Xbox 360 |
| 2009 | The Saboteur | Microsoft Windows, PlayStation 3, Xbox 360 |

=== Cancelled ===
- Batman: The Dark Knight
- Mercenaries 3: No Limits
- The Next Big Thing/No Limits Racing
