= Mercenaries 2: World in Flames =

2008 video game

- Developers: Pandemic Studios; Artificial Mind and Movement (PS2); LTI Gray Matter (PC)
- Publisher: Electronic Arts
- Director: Cameron Brown
- Producer: David Baker
- Designer: Scott Warner
- Programmers: John Northan; Jason L. Maynard, Daniel Zahn & Chris Farrar (PC)
- Artist: Amie Haemi Hong
- Writer: Matthew Colville
- Composer: Chris Tilton
- Engine: Zero 2.0
- Platforms: Windows, PlayStation 2, PlayStation 3, Xbox 360
- Release: NA: August 31, 2008; NA: September 4, 2008 (PC); EU: September 5, 2008; JP: November 20, 2008
- Genre: Action-adventure
- Modes: Single-player, multiplayer

Mercenaries 2: World in Flames is an action-adventure video game developed by Pandemic Studios and published by Electronic Arts for PlayStation 2, PlayStation 3, Xbox 360 and Windows. It is the sequel to 2005's Mercenaries: Playground of Destruction. The game is a third-person shooter with an open world, set in a fictionalized war-torn Venezuela. The game's primary objective is to assassinate the President of Venezuela whose betrayal of the protagonist mercenary acted as a stepping stone to their current position.

Following the closure of Pandemic Studios, EA announced in November 2009 that EA Los Angeles were working on a title known as Mercs Inc. The game was eventually canceled following the closure of Danger Close Games in 2013.

== Gameplay ==
Most of the game's elements are inherited from its predecessor with the addition of new features. The game is set in an open-world map representing a fictionalized Venezuela featuring tropical landscapes mixed with urban zones, industrial sectors, military settlements and fishing villages scattered across the map. As the story progresses, the player gradually unlocks more sections of the map which can be explored.

The mercenary must complete missions for several factions in order to discover Solano's hideout and weaken its regime. There are primary, secondary missions and minigames, the last one can be completed at any time and does not affect the story directly. Apart from the missions, the player can hunt High-value Targets (HVTs) which are located in different parts of the map; each faction has its own HVTs that are either members of the Venezuelan regime or members of other factions. The player can either capture the HVT and call out a helicopter from the requesting faction or kill it and take a picture of their corpse; the former one has a higher bonus but it is harder to perform successfully.

Apart from the returning Allied Nations and China, other four factions that's present in the game are the Venezuelan army (abbreviated as VZ or VZA), Universal Petroleum, The People's Liberation army (PLAV) and the Pirates. Each faction has unique armaments, vehicles, uniforms and architectures. All of the factions can be friendly to the player at first (except for the VZ), but the relations with the player can change depending on the behavior of itself, for example, shooting a member of a faction or stealing and/or destroying its resources can cause one of the members to alert their HQ and if it successfully delivers the message can make a faction hostile. If a faction becomes hostile, its members will shoot the player on sight, and also it cannot complete missions or purchase items. If the player wants to fix any and all relations with a faction, it must either pay a fair bribe to the angered faction or kill personnel or destroy property of a rival faction so the displeased faction becomes friendly again.

== Plot ==
Following the events of the Second Korean War, the Mercenary and their technical support advisor Fiona Taylor leave Executive Operations to work independently. Three years later, the Mercenary is referred to a contract in Venezuela by Blanco, a Liberian who the Mercenary had worked with in Dakar. Blanco introduces them to Ramon Solano, a billionaire software entrepreneur with family ties to drug trafficking. Using his connections, Solano had convinced General Carlos Carmona and large portions of the Venezuelan Army to overthrow the Venezuelan government, but General Carmona had since been captured by a group of loyalist army units, leading Ramon Solano to hire the Mercenary to rescue him.

After successfully completing the contract, the Mercenary returns to Solano's estate, but Solano refuses to pay and orders them to be executed. Blanco also betrays the Mercenary, attempting to execute them, and the Mercenary is shot in the buttock amidst their escape. Backed by a majority of the Venezuelan armed forces, Solano publicly declares himself Venezuela's new leader as the Mercenary swears revenge.

Solano's coup d'état throws Venezuela into chaos, with leftist paramilitaries taking arms against both Solano's government and the U.S.-based fossil fuels corporation Universal Petroleum, which ends up resisting attempts to nationalize its vast hold on Venezuela's oil reserves with a small army of mercenaries. The Mercenary can fight for either side or both sides as they seek to build a private military corporation of their own, gathering funds, resources, and personnel along the way.

The growing violence and disorder ultimately leads to foreign intervention, with the American-led Allied Nations bringing a vast force in under the command of Agent Joyce, while the Chinese send forth Zhou Peng, now a general in the People's Liberation Army, to command a similarly massive army against their American-led adversaries. Both sides offer considerable incentives to back them, and the Mercenary must ultimately side with one side or the other. As Solano's fortified bunker complex can only be breached by a nuclear-tipped "bunker buster" bomb, the Mercenary works to obtain one through the AN or the Chinese, and ultimately settles their score with Solano before leaving for India.

== Marketing and release ==
In preparation for the release of Mercenaries 2, Electronic Arts opened a commercial campaign in August 2008, with scenes of the plot of the game in a stylized world, featuring background music reminiscent of a "hip-hop musical" singing about how the protagonists are going to get revenge for being double crossed and getting no pay to boot. The song, called "Oh No You Didn't", was written and performed by the Wojahn Brothers and was released as a single on September 23.

EA took over the Last Stop petrol station in Finsbury Park, North London, on the release day of the game in order to give away £20,000 worth of petrol for free, with each driver receiving a maximum of £40. The petrol station was transformed into a military bunker, with sandbags, oil barrels and jeeps. The area's member of parliament, Lynne Featherstone, described the campaign as an "ill thought-out media stunt" after it created unnecessary traffic congestion.

The demo of the game became available on September 18 on the PlayStation Network and Xbox Live.

=== Downloadable content ===
Pandemic Studios developed a free patch, called "Total Payback", which adds six new playable characters, cross-region co-op, and cheats. The patch was released on October 23 for PS3 and October 31 for 360 users.

A downloadable content (DLC) content pack "Blow It Up Again" was released for download on the PlayStation Store in December 12. An Xbox 360 version of DLC was expected to come soon after Sony's release, but DLC had relatively little advertising and failed to even have an official announcement from Pandemic aside from a simple trailer which was available for download on the Xbox Live Marketplace. It has also been raised from free to $1.99.

The "Total Payback" patch and "Blow It Up Again" content pack have not been released for the Windows version.

== Reception ==
Reception

Aggregate score
Aggregator	Score			
Aggregator	PC	PS2	PS3	Xbox 360
Metacritic	70/100	49/100	72/100	72/100

Review scores
Publication	Score			
Publication	PC	PS2	PS3	Xbox 360
Eurogamer	N/A	N/A	N/A	5/10
Famitsu	N/A	23/40	31/40	31/40
Game Informer	N/A	N/A	7.25/10	7.25/10
GamePro	N/A	N/A	N/A	3.5/5
GameRevolution	N/A	B+	B+	B+
GameSpot	N/A	3.5/10	5/10	5/10
GameSpy	N/A	N/A	4/5	4/5
GameTrailers	N/A	N/A	7.9/10	7.9/10
GameZone	N/A	5/10	8.3/10	8.5/10
Giant Bomb	N/A	N/A	3/5	3/5
IGN	7.9/10	3.9/10	(AU) 8/10 (US) 7.9/10	(AU) 8/10 (US) 7.9/10
Official Xbox Magazine (US)	N/A	N/A	N/A	7.5/10
PC Gamer (US)	69%	N/A	N/A	N/A
PlayStation: The Official Magazine	N/A	N/A	3/5	N/A
411Mania	N/A	N/A	N/A	5.2/10
Variety	N/A	N/A	(favorable)	N/A

Mercenaries 2: World in Flames received "mixed or average" reviews on all platforms except the PlayStation 2 version, which received "generally unfavorable reviews", according to the review aggregation website Metacritic.

Though praised for its colorful and destructive environments, many reviews have complained of "nagging annoyances" throughout the game that occasionally feel rushed and unfinished. One of the major problems was the unintelligent AI of both friendly and enemy NPCs, and the issue was aggravated by voice acting and repetitive lines. Some reviewers found several gameplay mechanisms questionable, such as the air supports and airstrikes being of limited value, over-powerful melee attacks and simplistic faction dynamics. The reactions from the new co-op mode were divided; while another player added to the fun, there were limitations, such as the tether between players and limited role of the passenger when in a vehicle.

Edge gave the PlayStation 3 version a score of 6/10 and said that, while it is inferior to the original game and suffers from poor NPC programming, it nonetheless "remains an absolute blast". In Japan, Famitsu gave it a score of one eight, one nine, and two sevens for the PlayStation 3 and Xbox 360 versions; and one six, one seven, and two fives for the PS2 version.

The version released on PlayStation 2 received overwhelmingly negative reviews, with IGN calling it "insulting" and "clearly a half-assed rebadging of the first game that wasn't finished", giving it a 3.9/10. GameSpot gave the PS2 version a 3.5/10 and said it "feels like a really bad GTA:SA mod made by a fan who was still in the learning phases of how to mod" and blamed "clipping, hideously blurry cutscenes, repetitive buildings, an endless of slough of glitches, enemies that all look alike...and a miserable color palette" as reasons this version could be considered "one of the worst games ever released on the PlayStation 2". GameSpot also shunned EA for tricking buyers into thinking the PS2 version of the game would be the same as the PS3 and Xbox 360 versions by using gameplay footage and still images from the newer console version to promote the PS2 version.

Mercenaries 2 was nominated for "Dubious Honors: Worst Game Everyone Played" by GameSpot in their 2008 video game awards, which was a category for games with large sales that had been panned by the critics. In addition, it won "Dubious Honors: Most Disappointing Game" by GameSpot.

=== Controversy ===
The game was criticized by the Venezuelan government, accusing the U.S. federal government of trying to drum up support from the American public for a real-life invasion of Venezuela with the purpose of overthrowing Hugo Chávez. Pandemic Studios had previously developed Full Spectrum Warrior (2004) for the U.S. Army. In response to the criticism, the official website of the game included the following disclaimer:

Pandemic Studios is in the business of entertainment. It has not been contacted by a U.S. government agency concerning the development of ''Mercenaries 2''. All persons, storylines and events are purely fictional and bear no relation to real events. As with any number of games, movies and books, the decision to choose interesting events and locations is purely designed to tell a compelling story, as well as provide a fun and rich experience for the gamer.

== Related media ==
A three-issue comic book series, titled Mercenaries, was released by Dynamite Entertainment from October 2007 to December 2007 as a tie-in to the game. It was written by Brian Reed, with art by Edgar Salazar, and cover art by Michael Turner.

A Java-based mobile game was released in 2008 by I-play. It is depicted from a top-down perspective.
