= Full Spectrum Warrior: Ten Hammers =

2006 video game

- Developer: Pandemic Studios (Note: Ported to PlayStation 2 by Mass Media Games.)
- Publisher: THQ
- Director: William Henry Stahl
- Designer: Richard Wyckoff
- Programmer: Alexander Boczar
- Artist: Rositza Zagortcheva
- Composer: Garry Schyman
- Platforms: PlayStation 2, Windows, Xbox
- Release: NA: March 27, 2006; EU: June 23, 2006
- Genre: Real-time tactics
- Modes: Single-player, multiplayer

Full Spectrum Warrior: Ten Hammers is a real-time tactics video game developed by Pandemic Studios and published by THQ for Microsoft Windows, PlayStation 2 and Xbox. It is a sequel to the game Full Spectrum Warrior.

== Gameplay ==
The game features improvements and additions in gameplay. New gameplay mechanics such as splitting up fireteams into groups of two were added. The player is given the ability to position fireteams in interior firing positions that negate an enemy's cover.

The game's multiplayer mode enables the players to choose between co-op and coalition vs insurgency forces, and the insurgent commanders have the ability to recruit civilians to their side. Each side can also capture safe houses for reinforcements and field medics. Each fireteam member also had a special attribute. The team leader and rifleman are able to snipe an enemy soldier if a part of his body is shown. The Squad Automatic Weapon (SAW) gunner does the suppressing fire while the M203 gunner uses his M203 grenade launcher. Ability to control armored vehicles such as armored personnel carriers (APC) was added. In some missions, the fireteam leaders can call in air strikes with an AH-64 Apache gunship and also control an armored Humvee equipped with a .50 caliber machine gun.

=== Weapons ===
A US Army soldier throws a fragmentation grenade.

In the game a fireteam usually consists of four soldiers: a team leader (scoped M4 Carbine/Heckler and Koch HK33), an automatic rifleman (M249 SAW), a grenadier (M4/M203 grenade launcher or an HK33 with an HK79 grenade launcher) and a rifleman (scoped M4 Carbine/HK33). Their weapons have 2 fire modes: a fire sector and precision fire. When assigned a fire sector, the team will fire at anything within that sector, suppressing enemies. The player cannot manually aim the weapon and the soldiers are unlikely to hit an enemy behind cover. To use precision fire a soldier will have to step out of cover, making him extremely vulnerable to unsuppressed enemies, and use the 'special ability' of his weapon. The scoped rifles can snipe an enemy behind cover, the M249 SAW can suppress a large number of enemies (at the cost of ammunition) and the M203 can launch a grenade over a large distance.

In a few missions the player is able to control the M2 Bradley IFV. The 7.62mm machine gun can be controlled with a fire sector and the precision fire uses the M242 Bushmaster. In one mission the player can also control a captured BMP for a short while, which is very similar to the Bradley.

Also in the player's arsenal are the AK-47, a M2 Browning machine gun mounted on an armored Humvee, the M82 Barrett rifle and the SMAW. These weapons are used by Charlie or Delta team which consist of only 1 soldier each.

== Plot ==
=== Background story ===
Six months after the fall of Al-Afad's regime in Full Spectrum Warrior, the coalition has established an interim government to transition Zekistan into democracy, but severe problems were also emerging. Zekistan has erupted into a sectarian conflict. The warring factions are composed of the Mujahideen Al-Zeki, an Al-Afad loyalist group attempting to re-establish the old regime; and the Anser Al-Ra'id, a northern ethnic Zeki faction seeking northern ethnic Zeki independence in the province of Tien Hamir under his rule. The previously peaceful province and its regional capital city, Khardiman, became a focus of the fighting in the country when Mujahideen forces stage an uprising, bringing them into conflict with American forces, British UN Coalition forces, and National Militia forces under the control of regional governor Andrei Zakirov and the Anser Al-Ra'id forces. To make matters worse, Anser Al-Ra'id forces soon turn on American, Coalition and National Militia forces, but British forces were able to re-take the Tien Hamir Bridge from insurgent control and US forces were able to re-take most of the city, halting a possible civil war between the Mujahideen, Al-Ra'id forces and the Zekistani government. At the center of the conflict is Sergeant Eric Daniels, a well-intentioned soldier who abandoned his post during the uprising and is seeking redemption for his past mistakes.

=== Campaign storyline ===
During the beginning phases of the uprising, a British Army squad led by Sergeant Brian Sims and Sergeant Hyde were assigned to take the Tien Hammir Bridge. Sergeant Daniels requests their aid while heading for the bridge. Both fireteams help Daniels provide aid to his men and repel the insurgency in his assigned post before storming the Art Center and taking control of the bridge. Meanwhile, Daniels leads a squad of men to raid local boathouses in order to destroy the weapons supply ring. The British Army requests Daniels' aid in destroying artillery cannons located in the local Parliament building. Despite the destruction of one artillery cannon, British Army captain Smithson orders an airstrike on the Parliament building, crippling Daniels' squad.

With his men scattered and wounded, Daniels rallies isolated teams of soldiers to commandeer a bus in order to transport the wounded for a medical evacuation. Shortly after securing the bus, Daniels' newly formed team travels through Al Ra'id territory to reach the Tien Hamir Monastery. Upon hitting the monastery, a CH-47 Chinook arrives to extract the wounded in the gardens. However, the threat of an RPG-wielding insurgent threatens the safety of his men, prompting Daniels to kill the insurgent and sacrificing his life to defend the evacuating soldiers from Al Ra'id forces. Meanwhile, a veteran squad led by Sergeant Santiago Mendez defends their patrol area from Al'Raid forces before being re-assigned to rescue Daniels. Mendez's team fight their way to the monastery, but arrive too late, recovering Daniels' corpse. Daniels is posthumously awarded the Silver Star for his heroic actions.

== Reception ==
Reception

Aggregate score
| Aggregator | Score | | |
| Aggregator | PC | PS2 | Xbox |
|---|---|---|---|
| Metacritic | 70/100 | 71/100 | 69/100 |

Review scores
| Publication | Score | | |
| Publication | PC | PS2 | Xbox |
|---|---|---|---|
| Edge | 7/10 | 7/10 | 7/10 |
| Electronic Gaming Monthly | N/A | 5/10 | 5/10 |
| Eurogamer | 6/10 | N/A | N/A |
| Game Informer | 7.25/10 | 7.25/10 | 7.25/10 |
| GamePro | N/A | N/A | 3.5/5 |
| GameSpot | 7.3/10 | 7.1/10 | 7.3/10 |
| GameSpy | 3.5/5 | 4/5 | 4/5 |
| GameTrailers | N/A | 8.1/10 | 8.1/10 |
| GameZone | N/A | 7.8/10 | N/A |
| IGN | 8.2/10 | 8/10 | 8.2/10 |
| Official U.S. PlayStation Magazine | N/A | 2/5 | N/A |
| Official Xbox Magazine (US) | N/A | N/A | 7/10 |
| PC Gamer (US) | 78% | N/A | N/A |
| The Sydney Morning Herald | 3.5/5 | 3.5/5 | 3.5/5 |
| The Times | 3/5 | 3/5 | 3/5 |

Full Spectrum Warrior: Ten Hammers received "average" reviews, according to review aggregator Metacritic.
