= True Lies (video game) =

1995 video game

- European Mega Drive cover art
- Developer: Beam Software
- Publisher: Acclaim Entertainment (Note: Released under the LJN brand name on Nintendo systems.)
- Director: Cameron Brown
- Composer: Marshall Parker
- Platforms: Game Boy, Game Gear, Genesis, Super NES
- Release: 1995
- Genre: Run and gun
- Mode: Single-player

True Lies is a top-view run and gun video game based on the 1994 film of the same name. The game was developed by Beam Software and published by Acclaim Entertainment. Four different versions of the game were released for the Super Nintendo Entertainment System, Sega Genesis, Game Gear, and Game Boy. The home versions and portable versions are drastically different from each other, but have similar play mechanics.

== Gameplay ==
The player controls Harry Tasker, who is tasked with the duty of foiling the terrorist plot of Salim Abu Aziz. Each stage has a particular series of goals that the player must fulfill before reaching the stage's goal. Harry's abilities include the ability to keep his aim steady at one direction while shooting and a diving shoulder roll move that allows him to avoid enemy fire. The player has a health gauge and a limited number of lives, with power-ups available that restore health. In addition to enemies, there are also civilians that the player must not harm during shoot-outs. If the player kills three civilians in the same stage, he will be forced to restart the current stage at the cost of one life.

Harry starts each stage wielding only a semi-automatic pistol that has unlimited ammo, but must be reloaded after every 15 shots. In each stage, Harry can procure three additional firearms (an Uzi machine gun, a shotgun, and a flamethrower that takes the pistol's spot upon being equipped), as well as hand grenades and anti-personnel mines, which he can switch between at any point. Unlike the pistol, Harry's other weapons have limited ammunition (with a different maximum capacity) and individual ammo for each must be found if Harry runs out.

There are a total of nine stages, which consist of a chateau, a mall, a park, a subway, a dock, a Chinese city, an oil refinery, an overseas highway, and an office building. A password feature is available that allows the player to restart the game at later stages.

Stills from the movie mark the beginning of each level and the end of the game.

== Portable versions ==
The portable versions of True Lies for the Game Boy and Game Gear are a bit simplified compared to the console versions for the Super NES and Sega Genesis. The Game Boy and Game Gear version are almost identical to each other, aside from the addition of colored graphics in the Game Gear version. Although the play mechanics are similar, Harry's shoulder diving roll was removed due to limited controls, although all the weapons, except the flamethrower, are included. Only five stages (the chateau, the mall, the park, the docks, and the office building) are included and the level designs are completely different.

== Reception ==
Reception

Review score
| Publication | Score |
|---|---|
| Electronic Gaming Monthly | 8/10, 7/10, 6.5/10, 7/10 (SNES) |

Next Generation reviewed the SNES version of the game, rating it two stars out of five, stating that "ten entire levels of this get plain monotonous".

In Japan, Famicom Tsūshin gave the SNES and Genesis versions each a score of 22 out of 40. One reviewer in Electronic Gaming Monthly said that the game's controls and graphics are surprisingly solid, and that the somewhat mindless and repetitive gameplay is relieved by the inclusion of secret areas and the variety of weapons. GamePro commented that the graphics and music are mediocre, but that "the action gets frantic but never unbearable" and the game serves as an enjoyable throwback to overhead action-adventure games like Zombies Ate My Neighbors and Soldiers of Fortune. Their review of the Genesis version stated it to be "identical to the recent SNES version". A reviewer for Next Generation was also pleased with the Genesis version, remarking that the game is fun to play and true to the film it is based on. He gave it three out of five stars, concluding it to be "not incredibly original or pretty, just surprisingly fun".

GamePro commented that the Game Gear version "isn't so much an entertainment vehicle as it is a torture device", citing severe slowdown which brings the game almost to a halt whenever more than two characters are onscreen, extraneous and confusing background details, irritating and repetitive sound effects, and poor controls.
