= Invisible wall =

Boundary feature in some video games

An invisible wall (or alpha wall, or barrier) is a boundary in a video game that limits where a player character can go in a certain area, but does not appear as a physical obstacle. The term can also refer to an obstacle that in reality could easily be bypassed, such as a mid-sized rock or short fence, which does not allow the character to jump over it within the context of the game. In 2D games, the edge of the screen itself can form an invisible wall, since a player character may be prevented from traveling off the edge of the screen.

In 3D games, invisible walls are used similarly to prevent a player leaving the gameplay area, or getting trapped in a small inescapable space, though visible boundaries such as stone walls or fences are generally preferred. Completely invisible walls are cited to be level design bugs, and might be "left-over geometry" from an earlier version of the level or an object's improperly-aligned collision box. Nevertheless, designers might add invisible walls on cliffs to keep characters from falling off or use them as final borders of large open worlds, to make the world appear even larger than it actually is.

== Effect on player immersion ==
Invisible walls can cause discrepancies between a game's systemic logic and its fictional logic, as a game's rules dictate that one cannot continue past the wall, while the fictional setting cannot explain why this is. This breaks the supposed internal reality of the game. The existence of invisible walls, however, does not break player immersion as much as they might seem to, because most gamers are fully aware of the limitations of game worlds and accept the inability to venture off the path as a given. The true threat to player immersion is not the mere existence of invisible walls, but whether they are consistent and credible within the game world. For example, if the player character is normally able to jump over knee-high fences, encountering such a fence that cannot be jumped over breaks immersion much more than if the player character is normally incapable of scaling any sort of fence.

Many games, especially open-world games, use substitutes for invisible walls that prevent players from encountering an edge of a level – or becoming lost – while retaining more immersion, like extremely powerful or invincible threats or enemies, such as restricted areas subject to lethal airstrikes in Mercenaries: Playground of Destruction.

== Bypassing invisible walls ==
Computer glitches or the use of computer game cheats can result in both visible and invisible walls becoming penetrable. If a player character passes through a wall, they may enter an area of the game not intended for their use. This might be an area containing unused portions of a level, or an area containing nothing at all. Visible and invisible walls exist to keep players out of such areas.
