= Battlezone II: Combat Commander =

1999 video game

- Developers: Pandemic Studios; Big Boat Interactive (remaster)
- Publishers: Activision; Rebellion Developments (remaster)
- Director: George Collins
- Producer: Matthew Candler
- Designer: William Henry Stahl
- Artist: Carey James Chico
- Composer: Carey James Chico
- Platform: Microsoft Windows
- Release: NA: 30 December 1999; EU: 25 February 2000; 1 March 2018 (remaster)
- Genres: First-person shooter, real-time strategy
- Modes: Single-player, multiplayer

Battlezone II: Combat Commander is a hybrid tank shooter, first-person shooter and real-time strategy video game, developed by Pandemic Studios, and published by Activision in 1999-2000. It is the sequel to the 1998 game Battlezone, in which players pilot various futuristic vehicles across different planets, along with building and managing additional units and structures. The game's story focuses on a conflict during an alternative 1990s period, in which humanity explores space for resources only to encounter an alien race in the process that they become locked in combat with. Although met with great enthusiasm, the game generated negative reviews due to bugs and other complaints by players, though retrospective reviews were more positive.

A remastered version was released in March 2018 under the title Battlezone: Combat Commander on the gaming platforms GOG.com and Steam.

== Plot ==
=== Setting ===
Battlezone II takes place within the same alternative history universe as Battlezone. In the 1960s, humanity came across a rare resource that landed on Earth via meteor shower called "bio-metal". The resource heightened tensions between the nations of the United States and the Soviet Union, as both formed their own space forces and eventually engaged with each on across several planets and moons in the Solar System. During this time, both sides came to learn that bio-metal was developed by an extinct alien civilization called the Cthonians, who maintained a vast empire that stretched across the system, before being undone by a new form of technology - a highly advanced vehicle called a Fury - that became sentient and aggressive. Both sides eventually form a truce in order to combat the threat before it could destroy humanity.

30 years later, the advancement of science and technology through bio-metal led to the formation of two separate organisations to ensure that that Earth's countries are kept in relative peace and harmony with one another - the International Space Defense Force (ISDF), an international peacekeeping force that secures bio-metal for Earth; and the Alliance of Awakened Nations (AAN), who oversee the distribution of resources between countries.

=== Story ===
General Braddock, head of the ISDF, orders troops to be sent to Pluto, after the AAN are alerted to the presence of an unknown outpost on the planet designated Cerberus Base after a distress call is sent out by its base commander, Major Henry Manson. Braddock orders the troops, including Lieutenant John Cooke and Commander Yelena Shabayev, to investigate the call, which had reported that the base came under attack from an unknown group of vehicles. Upon arrival, the ISDF discover that the base was attacked by an alien force called the Scions, and promptly work to secure the base and discover where they are operating. Learning that the Scions came from a planet within the Solar System that was unknown to astronomers, dubbed the "Dark Planet", Braddock sends his troops to investigate further.

Cooke and Shabayev discover that the Scions are making use of structures and technology connected to the Cthonians, including a wormhole that links to another part of the galaxy. Braddock focuses on sending the ISDF after the Scions in order to defeat them, suspecting that they are attempting to create a superweapon that could endanger Earth. However, as the ISDF focuses on combating the threat, Manson, Cooke and Shabeyev begin questioning Braddock's motives. The AAN eventually determine that Braddock was acting without their authority, and was responsible for constructing Cerberus Base, as well as attempting to cover up information regarding the Scions. After Braddock is suspended from duty pending a court-martial, the AAN attempt to broker a peace between the two factions. The diplomat sent to oversee negotiations is killed in a surprise attack, with Manson and Shabeyev lost in the ensuing chaos when their dropship plummets and crashes. Cooke continues to focus on missions assigned by Braddock, returned to duty, eventually assisting in the capture of the Scion's leader from the dropship's crash site.

Before Cooke can bring him back to the ISDF, a lone Scion craft contacts him, claiming to be Shabeyev, and informing him that Braddock has been lying, and that the Scions are linked to a former squadron of the ISDF. While she attempts to persuade him to bring the leader back with her, Braddock orders him to destroy the craft, claiming it is a Scion trick. At this point, Cooke is left with two options.

==== ISDF alternate ending ====
John obeys his superior's command and destroys the Scion craft. Braddock informs him that Manson and his men survived, but they refused to obey, saying that Braddock is a traitor to the AAN. Cooke inserts a small team under his lead and destroys the base. Manson's body is found at the outskirts of the base. They also find out that Burns has escaped.

Following Scion transmissions, they locate the heart of the Scion society, a medium-sized planet called the "Core" planet, which is presumed to be artificial. After establishing an outpost, Cooke follows a convoy to a hole in the crust, leading to the planet's interior. He descends, and after dispatching numerous automated defenses, destroys the central crystal, causing the planet to collapse and detonate.

==== Scion alternate ending ====
Instead of shooting the Scion as commanded by Braddock, Cooke orders the Tug carrying Burns to follow the Scion. After leading him through a tunnel, the Scion confirms that she is Shabayev. She was found by the Scions on Bane after the crash. She explains that Braddock ordered the attack on the drop ships to silence them. He had also ordered the Voyager to be shot down to prevent the AAN from detecting the ISDF base on the Dark Planet. She also reveals to John that the Scions are actually humans who have been fused together with bio-metal. At the core of the Collective are the former members of the Black Dog Squadron. After the uprising, they fled to the Dark Planet, then into the Scion system, where they found the Cthonian ruins on Mire and embraced their culture. Their ultimate goal is not to destroy Earth, but to bring the enlightened Cthonian culture back to humanity.

John is transformed into a Scion to better aid their cause. He is informed by Burns that the three machines that were disarmed were called alchemators, and that they did not destroy planets but rather terraformers. The Core Planet is dying, as evidenced by a large number of dead Scions found on Pluto and Dark Planet before. The Scion can only survive if they find a new planet, and the Dark Planet is the ideal candidate.

A routine patrol manages to steal one of the power crystals of the three machines. Shabayev asks John to escort the Hauler towing the power crystal to a nav point where it can be carried away by a Scion dropship. When the convoy arrives at the passage, a landslide occurs, causing them to have to reroute the Hauler. Cooke investigates the other side and sees a departing Scion vehicle. After the incident, Burns requests that John find and return the last two crystals. The second crystal is stolen from a base with a clever tactic: John lures the defenders into an ambush, then shuts down the defenses with a surgical artillery strike on the power generators. When the third crystal is acquired, each is sent to their respective alchemators. However, when he brings the final crystal to Rend, his team is ambushed by a much larger force of rebels who capture the crystal.

Burns receives information that Manson's AAN loyalists (including himself) have defied Braddock and are under siege from his New Regime troops. After breaking the siege, Cooke counterattacks with Manson's forces, destroying the NR base and even intercepting a rebel convoy carrying the crystal which they are willing to trade with Braddock for bio-metal.

With the last crystal in his possession, Cooke lands on Rend for a final payback. Braddock personally defends the alchemator with a trio of Attila Combat Walkers, but he is ultimately defeated and the crystal is placed. The three alchemators are then activated, and their combined beam is shot through a wormhole into the Solar System. The beam impacts into the Dark Planet, gradually transforming it into a new Core Planet at Earth's doorstep.

== Development ==
Pandemic Studios continued and expanded the concept of a RTS and FPS hybrid where the player drives the vehicle in the game, but using a mixture of the reticle and the space bar, selects units and buildings to build and orders units around the battle field. The F keys at the top of the keyboard were used to create groups of units for easy selection of the units presently on the battlefield when they were not in the range of the player to select via the spacebar.

Battlezone II was not very popular, likely due to Pandemic Studio's attempts to blend two genres together; both styles of player had trouble adapting to an unfamiliar genre. Programmer Ken Miller said, "BZ2 was meant to do that [appeal to both genres] at first, but headed in the opposite direction. The problem is that mixed-genre games only attract players that like both genres (the intersection) as opposed to either genre (the union). It mainly comes down to learning curve. Action/shooter gamers can pick up just about any action/shooter game on the market and play it in short order, as almost all of them use the same control scheme and feature similar gameplay conventions. Similarly, strategy gamers can pick up just about any strategy game on the market and play it, although strategy games tend to differ from each other more than action games. Confronting an action/shooter gamer with strategy or a strategy player with action tends to force them outside their genre "comfort zone" and requires a steeper learning curve. My pithiest, if somewhat unfair, summation is this: 'FPS players don't want to think; RTS players don't want to die.'"

== Reception ==
Reception

Aggregate score
Aggregator	Score
GameRankings	75%

Review scores
Publication	Score
CNET Gamecenter	8/10
Computer Games Strategy Plus	2.5/5
Computer Gaming World	4/5
Eurogamer	9/10
Game Informer	8.5/10
GameFan	88%
GamePro	3.5/5
GameRevolution	B−
GameSpot	6.6/10
GameSpy	90%
IGN	7.9/10
Next Generation	3/5
PC Accelerator	7/10
PC Gamer (US)	65%

When Battlezone II was released to the public in late December 1999 (after many delays that put the ship date beyond Christmas) the game received favourable reviews according to the review aggregation website GameRankings. However, it quickly began receiving negative views because of out-of-the-box bug issues and over the top requirements to run the game for its time, with a multiplayer that was broken and not fixed until patch 1.1 - as a result, the game received a lot of negative publicity while it was on the shelf.

Nick Smith of AllGame gave it four stars out of five, saying that it was "highly recommended both for fans of the original and new players to the space genre. But do play this on a PC with a fast processor and a good 8MB minimum, 3D enhanced graphics card to get the full effect of the experience." Aaron Reed of GameZone similarly gave it eight out of ten, saying, "If you are looking for a fun game to play single player and you want to follow a great campaign story line – this is not the place for you. While the storyline is actually pretty good, the missions themselves tend to take you away from the game's strong points. However, the graphics and sound are spectacular and if you want a good game to bang with your buddies or to just play a you-vs-cpu game every now and then, this game is a great one." Jim Preston of NextGen called the game "A fun and beautiful single-player experience for users with a high-end machine, but the multiplayer elements are still quite iffy."

In an interview Nathan Mates, a programmer that worked on Battlezone II, attempted to explain why, after the first game, BZ2 did not fare well on the market, in an interview with Battlezone Magazine: "Despite things not being a huge success at retail, there's a definite, but smaller, portion of the population that likes the FPS+RTS genre. Their options are somewhat limited. So they stick with what they know and love. As I said above [about why Battlezone III was never made], this tenaciousness can really backfire and hurt things – if the BZ1 fans hadn't bashed BZ2 for so long, then there might have been more people exposed to BZ2. I see this with different BZ2 versions – there's an extreme amount of anger directed at anything that changes."

== Modifications ==
Battlezone II was one of the first games to begin supporting modifications and was greatly expanded upon with the release of the unofficial patch 1.3 by Nathan Mates and Ken Miller, two employees of Pandemic Studio who had continued developing the game on their own time. Carey Chico, Art Director on the game, said: "Well, the goal of all our effort was to provide for a strong mod community to keep the game going. Seems like it's working."

Battlezone II was designed to be able to support player modifications and featured an in-game mapping tool. Existing vehicles can be modified and new vehicles can be created. Weapons, buildings and missions can also be edited.

== See also ==
- Battlezone (1980)
