= Cameron Brown (game director) =

Video game director

- Occupation: Video game director
- Notable work: Mercenaries, Rec Room

Cameron Brown, also known as Gribbly, is a video game producer and musician. His most notable works are as the creative director on Mercenaries: Playground of Destruction, Mercenaries 2: World in Flames, and Rec Room.

== Games ==
- Rec Room (2016–2026), Rec Room Inc. (as Chief Creative Officer)
- The Saboteur (2009), Electronic Arts UK Ltd.
- Mercenaries 2: World in Flames (2008), Electronic Arts, Inc.
- Destroy All Humans! (2005), THQ Inc.
- Mercenaries: Playground of Destruction (2005), LucasArts
- KKND2: Krossfire (1998), Melbourne House
- The Dame Was Loaded (1996), Philips Interactive Media, Inc.
- Radical Rex (1994), Activision, Inc.
- True Lies (1994), Acclaim Entertainment, Inc.

== Discography ==
Rec Room Volume 87 (2026)

Rec Room Volume Final Final (2026)

Grey Day (Re-release, 2026)

Rec Room Volume 1 (2021)

Rec Room Volume 2 (2021)

Rec Room Volume 3 (2021)

Grey Day (2003)

== Interviews ==
- "Digital Bruckheimer: Cameron Brown On Mercenaries 2", Christian Nutt, Gamasutra, April 17, 2008.
- "Pandemic's Cameron Brown hints Mercenaries 3, Mercenaries for Wii", QJ Staff, QuickJump Gaming network, April 17, 2008.
- "Pandemic's Cameron Brown on Christopher, Jennifer, and Mattias of Mercenaries 2". QJ Staff, QuickJump Gaming network, May 28, 2007.
- "Jennifer Mui Introduction with Cameron Brown", IGN.com, 31 August 2008.
- "Mercenaries 2:World in Flames - Zero Rules - Co-Op", Electronic Arts, 24 August 2008.
- "Mercenaries 2: World in Flames", Robert Purchese, Eurogamer, 17 April 2008.
- "Mercenaries - The Director Speaks", Will Tuttle, GameSpy, 6 January 2005.
- "Q&A: Pandemic on Mercenaries 2: World in Flames", GameSpot.
- "Interview with Cameron Brown: Producer on Mercenaries", Xbox World Australia, 4 February 2006.
- "Building community in a virtual world: Moderation tools in VR”, Code Newbie podcast, season 1, episode 2, August 24, 2017.
- "First GDC 2018 VR Talks Include Rec Room, Google and Penrose, UploadVR, 5 January 2018.
