= Full Spectrum Warrior =

2004 video game

- Developer: Pandemic Studios (Note: Ported to PlayStation 2 by Mass Media Games.) (Note: Mobile version by 5th Cell.)
- Publisher: THQ (Note: Mobile version published by THQ Wireless.)
- Director: William Henry Stahl
- Designer: Laralyn McWilliams
- Programmer: Fredrik Persson
- Artist: Rositza Zagortcheva
- Writer: Paul Robinson
- Composer: Tobias Enhus
- Engine: Havok
- Platforms: Xbox, Microsoft Windows, PlayStation 2
- Release: Xbox: NA: June 1, 2004; EU: June 25, 2004; Microsoft Windows: NA: September 21, 2004; EU: October 1, 2004; PlayStation 2: NA: March 22, 2005; EU: April 1, 2005
- Genre: Real-time tactics
- Modes: Single-player, multiplayer

Full Spectrum Warrior is a 2004 real-time tactics video game developed by Pandemic Studios and published by THQ for Xbox, Microsoft Windows and PlayStation 2. A sequel titled Full Spectrum Warrior: Ten Hammers was later released in 2006.

A J2ME version was developed by 5th Cell and published by THQ Wireless.

== Gameplay ==
Full Spectrum Warrior is a squad-based game in which the player issues commands to two fireteams, Alpha and Bravo. Each fireteam has a Team Leader equipped with an M4 carbine. The Team Leaders also carry a GPS receiver, which can be used to locate mission objectives and enemy locations, and a radio for communication with headquarters. The second team member is the Automatic Rifleman, equipped with an M249 Squad Automatic Weapon, used to lay suppressive fire on the enemy and assigned to take command if the team leader is shot. The third team member is the Grenadier, equipped with an M4 with an M203 grenade launcher attachment. The last team member is the Rifleman, equipped with an M4 carbine. If a member of the team is wounded, another member of the team will carry them. Lieutenant Phillips is the team commander and the player will usually find him with the CASEVACs, which are healing and ammunition points. Each fireteam has a limited amount of fragmentation and smoke grenades, in addition to the M203 grenades. Occasionally throughout the game, there will be a third asset designated as Charlie Team, ranging from anti-armor engineers to US Army Rangers.

Throughout the game, the player does not directly control any of the fireteam members; instead, orders are given using a cursor that projects onto the environment, letting the player tell his/her soldiers to hold a position and set a specific zone to cover with fire. It is also possible to order them to lay down suppressive fire on a given zone to cover the second squad's movement, or to reduce incoming fire.

Gameplay revolves around the concept of fire and movement, with one team providing suppressive fire while the other moves. The basic gameplay mechanics remain the same for the retail version of Full Spectrum Warrior, which was released on the Xbox, PlayStation 2 and Windows platforms. The retail version places much more emphasis on aesthetics; it possesses substantially improved graphics and sound. Cut scenes and voice acting are also characteristics that distinguish the retail version from the military version.

=== Multiplayer ===
Full Spectrum Warrior includes a cooperative mode that was designed to take advantage of Microsoft's Xbox Live online gaming service through the use of voice communication. In co-op mode, two players are in command of their own fireteam and must work together to accomplish the goals of the level. Two additional missions were also available to download via Xbox Live.

== Plot ==
Background story
A dramatic wave of terrorist attacks sweeps Europe and Southeast Asia, particularly targeting US and UK interests. After months of intense searching, US intelligence has tracked the source of the attacks to the tiny fictional nation of Zekistan in Central Asia.

U.S.-led operations in Iraq and Afghanistan have forced rebels and loyalists to flee, seeking refuge in the nation of Zekistan by invitation of the nation's dictator, Mohammad Jabbour Al-Afad. His tyrannical regime houses death camps and training centers for the terrorist networks, and promotes cleansing of the ethnic Zeki population. After several failed diplomatic solutions and repeated warning by the UN, NATO votes to invade Zekistan to remove Al-Afad from power.

Pakistan grants US access through its airspace, and the invasion begins. The USS Ronald Reagan and USS Carl Vinson launch aircraft to airstrike Al-Afad's air, armor, and bases across the nation. When the dust settles, infantry and armor from seven different NATO countries begin to land at southern Zekistan. Under the cover of darkness, the U.S.-led forces converge on the capital city of Zafarra.

Campaign storyline
The story starts at the MOUT (if the player chooses to play the tutorial) in Fort Benning, as fireteams Alpha and Bravo of squad Charlie 90, B Company, 159th Light Infantry goes through the training at Fort Benning, Georgia as they prepare for their deployment to Zekistan as part of the NATO Invasion force sent to invade the country. When they arrived Zekistan, their first objective is to help secure the airfield, the main airport in the city, but the route to the airport is crawling with resistance; the first few hours after they arrived, they were ambushed.

After the Airport is successfully captured, Charlie 90 is tasked with infiltrating Al-Afad's palace and eliminating him. They trek through the city and make it to the palace. While they manage to capture one of Afad's top lieutenants, Afad escapes. The members of Charlie 90 also witness one of the Joint STARS planes crashing into the city. The squad is then ordered to rescue the crew of the downed plane before they can be captured by Afad's men.

Charlie 90 secures the crash site, but the crew of the plane is taken hostage by Afad's men. Charlie 90, with the assistance of two Ranger snipers, finds and rescues the crew. Charlie 90 then track Afad down and find his SUV in an old train yard. Charlie 90 must then call in an airstrike on the SUV before it escapes. If the player orders the strike in time, U.S. gunships swoop down and destroy the SUV, eliminating Al-Afad.

Epilogue missions
Despite the death of Al-Afad, propaganda broadcasts were made by a surviving group of Al-Afad soldiers called the Black Wind Brigade, headed by one of Al-Afad's sons Al-Hamal. As a way of repaying the Army Rangers from Mike 25 a debt for saving them in a parking lot, both Alpha and Bravo team from Charlie 90 were "on loan" to them to participate in unofficial assignments. In the first mission, both teams were to mark a radio tower for an airstrike to end the propaganda broadcasts. On the second epilogue mission, both fireteams, with assistance from Staff Sergeant Hackett, were sent to a mosque to take out the Black Wind Brigade. Although Al-Hamal is killed by an airstrike during a firefight, the younger brother, Colonel Samir who was presumed to be dead assumes the role as ruler, willing to work towards democracy and stray away from his father and brother's tyrannical regime.

These missions were released as DLC for the Xbox version and are included in the PC and PS2 versions by default and unlocked from the start, but the game still goes to credits after the last "Normal" mission and the player must manually start them from the level select on PC.

A third Epilogue mission is available exclusively in the PS2 port (which also added online co-op support for the previous two epilogue missions) where after discovering a mass grave the day before in a previous mission in the regular campaign, Charlie 90 are assigned to Army Ranger Cpt.Stark temporarily and must defend an aid station setup to identify the dead by patrolling the area and ensuring none of Al-Afad's surviving Mujahideen reach it while Cpt.Stark provides sniper cover from a rooftop next to the aid station.

== Development ==
In 2000, the U.S. Army's Science & Technology community was curious to learn if commercial gaming platforms could be leveraged for training. Recognizing that a high percentage of incoming recruits had grown up using entertainment software products, there was interest in determining whether software game techniques and technology could complement and enhance established training methods.

Having established a U.S. Army University Affiliated Research Center (the Institute for Creative Technologies – ICT) in 1999 for the purpose of advancing virtual simulation technology, work began in May 2000 on a project entitled C4 under ICT Creative Director James Korris with industry partners Sony Imageworks and their teammate, Pandemic Studios, represented by co-founders Josh Resnick and Andrew Goldman.

At the time, there was a great deal of interest in leveraging the stability, low cost and computational/rendering power of the new generation of game consoles, chiefly Sony's PlayStation 2 and Microsoft's Xbox, for training applications. Legal restrictions on the PlayStation (using the platform for a military purpose) combined with the default Xbox configuration "persistence" (i.e. missions recorded on the embedded hard drive for after-action review) led to the final selection of the Xbox platform for development.

A commercial release of the game was required for Xbox platform access. The team, however, quickly concluded that a viable entertainment title might differ from a valid training tool. The exaggerated physics of entertainment software titles, it was believed, could produce a negative training effect in the Soldier audience. Accordingly, the team developed two versions of the game. The Army version was accessible through a static unlock code; the entertainment version played normally.

The most radical decision in the game's development was to limit first-person actions to issuing orders and directions to virtual Fire Teams and Squad members (see Gameplay). Given the popularity of the first-person shooter genre, it was assumed that all tactical-level military gameplay necessarily involved individual combat action. The application defied conventional wisdom, winning both awards and commercial acceptance. The game's working title evolved to C-Force (2001) and ultimately Full Spectrum Warrior (2003).

As work progressed on Full Spectrum Warrior, ICT developed another real-time tactical decision-making game with Quicksilver Software entitled Full Spectrum Command for the US Army's Infantry Captains Career Course, with the first-person perspective of a Company Commander. As the application was designed to play on a desktop PC (unlike the Xbox), no commercial release was necessary. Full Spectrum Command gave rise to a sequel developed for the US Army and Singapore Armed Forces (version 1.5). A related ICT/Quicksilver title, Full Spectrum Leader, simulates the first person perspective of a Platoon Leader.

Full Spectrum Warrior relates to the Army's program of training soldiers to be flexible and adaptable to a broad range of operational scenarios.

The game's budget was $5 million.

== Reception ==
Reception

Aggregate score
Aggregator	Score		
Aggregator	PC	PS2	Xbox
Metacritic	80/100	74/100	84/100

Review scores
Publication	Score		
Publication	PC	PS2	Xbox
Edge	N/A	N/A	8/10
Electronic Gaming Monthly	N/A	N/A	7.67/10
Eurogamer	8/10	N/A	8/10
Game Informer	N/A	N/A	8.25/10
GamePro	N/A	N/A	5/5
GameRevolution	N/A	N/A	C+
GameSpot	7.7/10	7.5/10	7.7/10
GameSpy	4.5/5	N/A	4.5/5
GameZone	8.5/10	8.1/10	9.4/10
IGN	8.8/10	8/10	9.2/10
Official U.S. PlayStation Magazine	N/A	4/5	N/A
Official Xbox Magazine (US)	N/A	N/A	8.8/10
PC Gamer (US)	88%	N/A	N/A
Entertainment Weekly	N/A	N/A	A
The New York Times	N/A	N/A	(favorable)

At the Game Critics Awards of E3 2003, Full Spectrum Warrior was awarded "Best Original Game" and "Best Simulation Game". The staff of X-Play nominated Full Spectrum Warrior for their 2004 "Best Strategy Game" award, which ultimately went to Rome: Total War. It was also a runner-up for Computer Games Magazine's 2004 "Best Interface" award, and for GameSpot's annual "Most Innovative Game" prize. During the 8th Annual Interactive Achievement Awards, the Academy of Interactive Arts & Sciences nominated Full Spectrum Warrior for "Console Action/Adventure Game of the Year" and "Computer Action/Adventure Game of the Year".

The Xbox and PC versions received "favorable" reviews, while the PlayStation 2 version received "average" reviews according to video game review aggregator Metacritic. According to the NPD Group, Full Spectrum Warrior sold roughly 190,000 units on the Xbox by the end of its debut month. Analyst Michael Pachter described this as a commercial success.

The game sold nearly 1 million copies for Xbox and PC.

Full Spectrum Warrior became the subject of some controversy shortly after it was released. The two primary complaints aired were that the United States Army was not using their training version of the game because it was not "realistic enough". Secondly, the United States Army had been short-changed. There was some discussion in the press regarding whether the government had either wasted money on the project, or if they had been taken advantage of by Pandemic Studios, and Sony Pictures Imageworks, their partner on the project.
