= The Dame Was Loaded =

1996 video game

- Developer: Beam Software
- Publisher: Philips Interactive Media
- Director: Cameron Brown
- Producers: Beam Software, Philips Interactive Media, Vixen Films
- Designer: David Giles
- Writer: Mark Morrison
- Platforms: MS-DOS, Macintosh
- Release: 1996
- Genre: Adventure game
- Mode: Single-player

The Dame Was Loaded is a first-person point-and-click adventure game for MS-DOS and Macintosh created by Australian developer Beam Software (now Krome Studios Melbourne). It was published in 1996 by Philips Interactive Media.

== Gameplay ==
The game is a detective film noir set in the 1940s. It combines live action cinematic's with pre-rendered point-and-click gameplay much like previous games in the genre like Under a Killing Moon and Myst. The live action was produced by Vixen Films, director Jo Lane, and was at the time the largest multimedia production ever made in Australia.

The game is nonlinear, having nine possible endings featuring over thirty fully acted and voiced characters to interact with and over one hour of fully performed cinematics.

== Plot ==
Innocent-looking dame Carol Klein hires down-on-his-luck hardboiled private dick Scott Anger to find her brother, since she hasn't heard from him for some time. Anger learns that his case is connected to some murders and a bank robbery.

== Reception ==
Reception

Review scores
Publication	Score
Next Generation	1/5
Computer Game Review	76/100

A reviewer for Next Generation panned the game, citing the use of still shots instead of FMV for most of the character interactions, the low difficulty, and the "cheesy, ersatz Maltese Falcon story". He scored it one out of five stars. Scott Gehrs of Computer Game Review wrote, "The Dame Was Loaded has an interesting premise, but unfortunately I can't recommend it even to mystery lovers".

Quandary wrote "In the end, the real time nature of the game prevented me from enjoying this outing...Timed puzzles are anathema to many adventure players".
