= Mercenaries: Playground of Destruction =

2005 video game

- Developer: Pandemic Studios
- Publisher: LucasArts
- Director: Cameron Brown
- Producer: Matthew Paul
- Designer: Robert Djordjevich
- Programmer: Ronald Pieket-Weeserik
- Artist: Mattias Kylén
- Writer: Matthew Colville
- Composers: Chris Tilton; Michael Giacchino
- Engine: Zero
- Platforms: PlayStation 2, Xbox
- Release: NA: January 11, 2005; EU: February 18, 2005
- Genre: Action-adventure
- Mode: Single-player

Mercenaries: Playground of Destruction is an action-adventure video game developed by Pandemic Studios and published by LucasArts for PlayStation 2 and Xbox. Additionally, the game can be purchased from the Xbox digital store and played on Xbox One and Xbox Series consoles through the Xbox backwards compatibility program.

The game features an open world environment, with elements of potential stealth gaming and reputation-based social mechanics, and is set during a fictitious multi-national military action in North Korea. The player gains control of one of three mercenary main characters and completes contracts in the war-torn country for profit and to prevent a nuclear war. Critics gave favorable reviews to the game, in particular praising its focus on explosive mayhem.

A sequel, Mercenaries 2: World in Flames, was released in 2008 for Windows, PlayStation 2, PlayStation 3 and Xbox 360. Following Pandemic Studios' closure in November 2009, Electronic Arts hired Danger Close Games to develop a second sequel, tentatively titled Mercs Inc. The game was eventually canceled following the closure of Danger Close Games in 2013.

== Gameplay ==
The player is deposited in a vast "sandbox" environment, free to pick up missions, perform side tasks, collect items, hijack vehicles, or employ game mechanics in exhibition. As the world is a sandbox, the player can choose to do any of these activities at any time. In fact, one can level all of the buildings in the game world, including the faction HQs. Buildings are usually restored after an extended time away from the area, the player's death, or re-loading the game. Also, the player can cause wanton destruction in many small outposts and strongholds occupied by and restricted to faction members only, but an excessive rampaging is discouraged by the reduction of the attacked faction's disposition towards the player, and the murders of civilians and Allied Nations personnel result in cash fines as well.

There are five warring factions: the Allied Nations (comprising various international militaries including the South Korean Army, though only American-English speaking characters are depicted), the South Korean Union (a Joint Task Force associated with the CIA), the Russian mafia, the People's Liberation Army of China, and Song's Korean People's Army. Disposition from the first four factions is initially friendly, though through the player's actions it can go from friendly to neutral and eventually hostile. Since the North Korean faction is always hostile towards the player and to all the other factions, the player is free to attack NK forces without fear of penalty. In fact, destroying NK vehicles will result in a small compensation, adding credits to the player's account.

In order to get back in the favor of an offended faction, the mercenary must complete contracts for the faction. If the faction is so hostile that it refuses to give out contracts, the player must bribe the HQ guard first. Other less effective methods include collecting National Treasures and Blueprints of interest to each faction, destroying hidden listening posts, leveling Song's monuments or helping out one faction fight off another one during a skirmish. Upon being witnessed, the player's actions will be favored by the faction receiving the help, but the other faction will dislike the player more.

A mercenary may disguise himself by driving a faction's vehicle, allowing for enemy outpost infiltration, but the disguise is rendered ineffectual should the enemy spot the mercenary entering the vehicle, should the player exit the vehicle or if the player engages in inappropriate behavior (such as attacking enemy troops). The disguise is also lost if the player comes across an enemy officer, who will invariably see through the disguise.

The player can perform various missions for different factions, but it is not required to complete every mission available. A mission involves one or multiple objectives that include stealing, delivery, retrieval, or destruction of certain items or vehicles, assassinating targets, and destruction of an enemy camp or stronghold. Often, a mission provides a bonus goal which may be completed for extra cash. AN missions are usually taxi and escort missions, whereas Mafia-instructed missions are somewhat more stealth-oriented, and SK and Chinese missions usually have the player take orders from one faction to harm the other one. A mission may upset another faction, although this can be prevented to some degree if the player engages the mission with stealth. The completion of a mission rewards the mercenary with cash, increase in the faction's disposition, and tips regarding the Deck of 52; it occasionally unlocks items, vehicles, or airstrikes.

Throughout the game, the player is tasked with hunting down and "verifying" 13 targets of a "suit". "Verification" involves either killing the target and taking a picture of the corpse, or subduing the target and radioing an AN helicopter to transport the prisoner away. After every verification the player is awarded with "Intelligence" and cash, which is usually doubled if the target is captured alive. In a suit, the number cards (from 2 to 10) are located throughout the in-game region, and they can be found by exploration or by receiving tips from friendly factions (usually after the completion of a mission). Each of the three face cards (Jack, Queen, King) is only made available by one of Chinese, South Korean, and Russian factions. A "face card mission" often involves specific objectives for the faction in addition to verifying the target, but it is not necessary to verify all members of a suit to progress through the game. The player must gain only enough Intelligence by verifying targets before the AN gives the player the Ace contract. The Ace, the most important figure in a suit, is located in an isolated, often heavily fortified area, where the player is dropped off. The Ace contract usually consists of a variety of required and optional objectives that can be accessed in multiple routes, before the Ace is available for verification. After the Ace is verified, the player is transported back to the main region to hunt down another suit of targets.

The PS2 version of the game suffers from a glitch, where saving the same campaign playthrough in multiple slots can result in corrupted data on the memory card, but saving in one slot each for different playthroughs with different characters is apparently fine.

If the player attempts to leave the game world (leaving N. Korea), they will effectively enter a restricted area where either the AN Task Force or the North Koreans have supreme air power in those areas, bearing great lethality that serves as an invisible wall to bar the player from going out of bounds. Entering these areas immediately prompts the players with a warning message (either by an unnamed Allied radio operator or by your support operative, respectively) telling them to get out quick. Choosing to ignore this warning prompts another message, informing that enemy planes are inbound. This is followed by three fighters appearing to shoot the player down with a large salvo of explosives that are impossible to completely dodge and tough to survive. These are areas that usually surround the province (with the exception of the Black Gate until after the Ace of Clubs is verified) and are marked in red.

== Plot ==
=== Synopsis ===
The game world takes place in North Korea, where General Choi Song leads a violent coup against his father President Choi Kim's government after years of gradually-increasing peaceful overtures between the two Koreas. Supposedly killing his own father, as well as several North and South Korean delegates during a peace ceremony, General Song seizes power and once again closes off North Korea to the world.

Some time later, the Royal Australian Navy locates a North Korean freighter in distress but also discovers its cargo of nuclear warheads bound for known terrorist elements, triggering an Allied Nations invasion to topple Song's regime. The Allies are able to secure Song's nuclear missile silos, but they soon learn of another launch site, its whereabouts unknown. Though badly-battered and forced to cede control of much of the country, the Korean People's Army stubbornly refuses to give more ground and starts launching counterattacks. Meanwhile, the AN must contend with the presence of the Chinese, nominally an ally but in reality there to annex North Korea; the Russian mafia, which sees the war as an immense opportunity for profit; and the South Koreans, who are set on reunifying Korea by force now that peaceful methods have failed.

Desperate to locate North Korea's nuclear missile silos, the Allied Nations post bounties related to the "Deck of 52", an array of prominent North Korean businessmen, senior military officers, weapons scientists, General Song's personal guard as well as Song himself. The Mercenary can either apprehend or kill members of the Deck, though killing them only rewards the player with half their bounty. The bounty increases according to the importance of that member all the way up to General Song, who is posted at $100,000,000.

Prior to entering the game world, the player is given the choice of playing as one of three available mercenaries. The choice does not affect the plot, and each character has slightly different statistics to each other and can understand a different language used by one of the four factions in game (except for the Allied Nations). The four factions are the Allied Nations, South Korea, China and the Russian Mafia. Each faction concerns itself with one goal influenced by the mercenaries' actions. The Allies for instance, only intend to remove Song from power though they possess the missions for the "Ace" contracts that advance the game. China and South Korea respectively both want to conquer North Korea, bringing the two factions closer to conflict as the game progresses. The Russian Mafia concerns itself only with exploiting the conflict and setting up illegal activities, and dealing arms which the mercenary may buy.

=== Game ===
The player is airdropped somewhere over the DMZ, finding the Allied Nations headquarters under artillery attack orchestrated by the "Two of Clubs". The mercenary assists AN forces in repelling the attack, destroying the guns and verifies the Two before venturing on to meet the other three factions in play. In completing assigned missions for each faction, the player is given intel relating to members of the Deck of 52 in the game world. By embarking on these optional missions, the player gathers enough intelligence to unlock the Ace contracts, the theatre of war moving from the Southern Province to the Northern Provinces midway through the game. The player finally arrives on the Ace of Spades contract: General Song himself. After heavy fighting against Song's remaining forces, the mercenary discovers through the still alive President Choi that Song has acquired the launch codes for his country's nuclear armament, and launches them before the mercenary enters battle with him.

Depending on the player's actions, there are numerous endings. If the player does not abort the nuclear missiles in time, a post-ending news report details that Seoul, as well as several other cities worldwide have been destroyed by the nuclear weapons. Furthermore, depending on who the player decided to assist the most, another report indicates that faction is assuming control over the North Korean state.

=== Characters ===
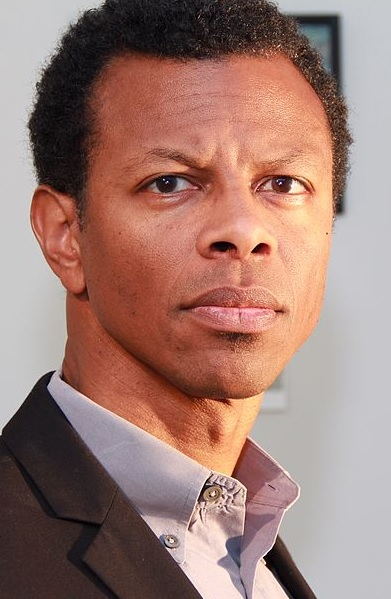
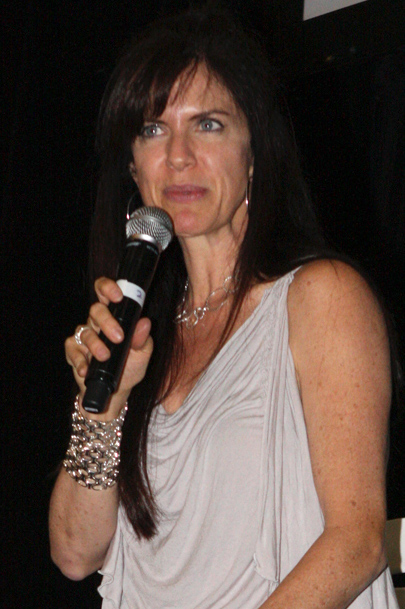
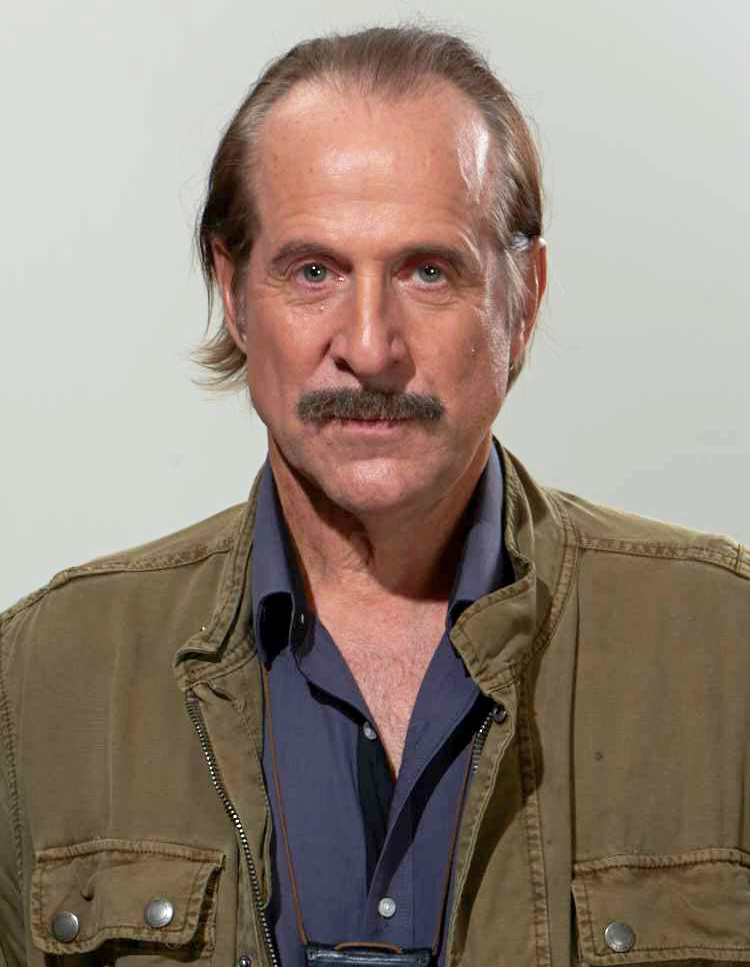
Phil LaMarr, Jennifer Hale, and Peter Stormare voice Chris Jacobs, Jennifer Mui, and Mattias Nilsson, respectively.

There are three playable characters in Mercenaries: Christopher Jacobs, Jennifer Mui, and Mattias Nilsson. Each are mercenaries employed by ExOps during the North Korean conflict, but only one character of player's choice is dispatched to the war-zone in the beginning of the game. They follow the same plot and handle similarly in terms of gameplay, but each of them has a different personality, as well as specific strengths that may alter the player's strategy. Also, each mercenary can speak a unique language in addition to English, so the player can understand conversations of a particular faction by reading the subtitles shown.

- Fiona Taylor (voiced by Amy Lee) is a support operative that presents plans and ideas and support to the player throughout the game.
- Chris Jacobs (voiced by Phil LaMarr) is a former Delta Force operator from the United States, and appears to be a confident and reliable personality with often humorous remarks. He can endure more damage than others and knows Korean.
- Jennifer Mui (voiced by Jennifer Hale) is a former SAS operative and MI6 agent. She is highly efficient in stealthy maneuvers as she does not alert enemies as easily as other mercenaries. Born to a Chinese-British family in Hong Kong, she can understand conversations in Chinese.
- Mattias Nilsson (voiced by Peter Stormare) was once a Swedish Navy artillery officer who then became a mercenary. Extremely reckless, violent, and obsessed with explosives, Nilsson uses his faster movement on foot to overwhelm his enemies quickly. He is fluent in Russian, and is thus able to understand private Mafia conversations.

Mercenaries contains unlockable skins as rewards for completing certain in-game tasks. For instance, picking up a certain number of National Treasures will allow playing as an NK Elite. Some cheat codes unlock the numerous hidden characters such as the leaders of each faction. This being a LucasArts game, it is also possible to unlock both Indiana Jones and Han Solo as playable characters, but the differences between skins are only cosmetic and will have no effect on gameplay or the main character's attributes.

== Development ==
The game's orchestral soundtrack was composed by Michael Giacchino with Chris Tilton. It was performed by the Northwest Sinfonia and released on a 21-track CD. The lead sound design was done by Ellen Meijers, who visited Travis Air Force Base to record the sounds of actual C-5 Galaxy cargo airplane hydraulics, landing gears, and generators along with recording gun sounds on a firing range and sounds of their impact on watermelons, street signs, car doors and several more to add realism to the gameplay. The Foley recordings were recorded at the Foley Stage at Skywalker Ranch.

== Reception ==
Reception

Aggregate score
Aggregator	Score	
Aggregator	PS2	Xbox
Metacritic	84/100	86/100

Review scores
Publication	Score	
Publication	PS2	Xbox
Edge	N/A	7/10
Electronic Gaming Monthly	8.67/10	8.67/10
Eurogamer	N/A	8/10
Famitsu	33/40	N/A
Game Informer	7.5/10	7.5/10
GamePro	4/5	4/5
GameRevolution	B+	B+
GameSpot	8.8/10	8.8/10
GameSpy	4.5/5	5/5
GameZone	9/10	9.2/10
IGN	9.1/10	9.1/10
Official U.S. PlayStation Magazine	4.5/5	N/A
Official Xbox Magazine (US)	N/A	9/10
Detroit Free Press	N/A	4/4
The Times	4/5	4/5

Mercenaries: Playground of Destruction received "generally positive" reviews, according to review aggregator Metacritic.

Ryan Davis of GameSpot said the action is greatly varied and "fundamentally satisfying", the world is immersive, and the game has "gorgeous graphics", calling it the best thing Pandemic Studios had ever made, but gave some minor criticism to overexaggerated explosion physics and a lack of consistency in sound design. Davis said that at first the game looks like a Grand Theft Auto knockoff due to similar elements such as a third-person perspective, and the ability to get in any vehicle the player wants, but praised Mercenaries for forcing its characters to explore its world more than a Grand Theft Auto game would. Davis also wrote: "It's amazing how close the game scrapes to reality without actually breaking through, and its use of a slightly fictionalized North Korea as a setting can be very immersive. But despite the game's commitment to a quasi-realistic scenario, the action is fast and loose". Davis noted the voiceover performances of Peter Stormare and Carl Weathers as particularly well done.

In Japan, where the PlayStation 2 version was ported and published by Electronic Arts on April 28, 2005, Famitsu gave it a score of two nines, one eight, and one seven for a total of 33 out of 40. Xbox Nation gave the game a 9/10 and called it "the first game to truly capitalize on GTA's design paradigm, and perhaps even surpass it". GameSpy gave the Xbox version of the game a perfect 5-star rating and gave glowing praise to the game's worldbuilding, writing "I can't remember the last time I played a game in which I wondered whether something could be done, and nine times out of ten it actually could be" and gave specific praise to the variety of missions, the balance between strategy-based gameplay and open-world exploration, and the musical score, which GameSpy called "possibly the best score of any Xbox game ever made". GameSpy gave the PS2 a 4.5/5, saying the game has an inconsistent sound mix, sound design for gunfire that sounds "stock and repetitive", and is overall glitchier and easier to break than the Xbox version, but still considered it an essential PS2 purchase and one of the best games the console had seen at the point in time.

Detroit Free Press gave the Xbox version all four stars and called it "a great diversion from everyday life". The Sydney Morning Herald gave the game four-and-a-half stars out of five and said "while it's not quite as epic as Grand Theft Auto: San Andreas, the combat within Mercenaries is more focused and polished, thanks to tight controls, amazing graphics and clever physics". The Times gave it four stars out of five, saying that "the visuals are first rate. News footage sets the scene of the chaos, while short in-game cut-scenes intertwine seamlessly with the action". The New York Times gave it a similarly favorable review, saying "while most such games overlay this free-form world with rigidly structured missions, Mercenaries allows the player almost as much freedom in action as it does in travel". Maxim similarly gave it eight out of ten and said: "Missions full of vehicles to wrangle and people to off feel like a cross between Grand Theft Auto and Metal Gear Solid with a dash of Contra thrown in for spice. Destroy everything and get paid; this is foreign policy at its finest".

In a list of the Top 100 games on the PlayStation 2, IGN ranked the game at 49th place, while the game sits as the 84th best PlayStation 2 game according to Metacritic. The editing staff at Digital Dream Door voted it 23rd place on their "Top 100 Greatest Xbox Games" list.

Mercenaries shipped 105,000 units for its launch in France alone.

=== South Korean ban ===
Mercenaries was banned from shelves in South Korea for depicting war in its still-hostile region, as was Tom Clancy's Ghost Recon 2 (2004). Almost two years later, in 2007, the Game Rating Board (GRB) of South Korea lifted the ban on these games.

== Sequels ==
A sequel, Mercenaries 2: World in Flames, was released in 2008.

Mercs Inc was a cancelled game in the series developed by Danger Close Games. It was a multiplayer third-person shooter. The game was first rumored to be in development by Pandemic Studios as either Project X or Y which were rumored to be based on the Mercenaries franchise. Footage of the game was first leaked onto the internet on November 24, 2009, and was a multiplayer trailer of the game. The game was then officially announced less than a day later by Electronic Arts without a proper platform or release date. The announcement of the game came less than a week after the closure of Pandemic Studios by Electronic Arts as it had been in development there under the name Project Y. The game was being developed by remaining Pandemic Studio staff members located at EA Los Angeles until the company was closed down in 2009.

Another sequel titled Mercenaries 3: No Limits was cancelled when Pandemic Studios shut down, and a showreel of early development footage was leaked in November 2010.
