= Dark Reign 2 =

2000 video game

- Developer: Pandemic Studios
- Publisher: Activision
- Director: Greg Borrud
- Designer: Christopher Lawrence
- Programmer: Andrew Cooper
- Artists: Will Rosas; Heston Barber
- Composers: Eric Klein; Christian A. Salyer
- Platform: Microsoft Windows
- Release: UK: June 30, 2000; NA: July 3, 2000; AU: July 2000
- Genre: Real-time strategy
- Modes: Single-player, multiplayer

Dark Reign 2 is a 3D real-time strategy video game developed by Pandemic Studios and released by Activision in 2000 for Microsoft Windows. A prequel to Dark Reign: The Future of War and its expansion pack, Dark Reign 2's storyline focuses on what came before the conflict in the first Dark Reign.

== Gameplay ==
Dark Reign 2 features three modes: campaign, online multiplayer, and an instant action mode. Multiplayer functionality allows up to 32 players at once, featuring four 'rulesets: Gluttony, Protect HQ, Blood Bath, and Deathmatch. Blood Bath is a mode in which the first team to kill a certain number of units wins. Protect HQ (by far the most used) is a ruleset in which a player who loses their HQ for a certain period of time (about three minutes) loses. Gluttony is a condition where the first player to collect a certain amount of resources wins. Deathmatch is a ruleset in which a player who loses all of their units is defeated.

Players are allowed to create custom mods for the game by making simple configuration files and using the packaging software which can be found on the original game CD.

The game has a built-in map editor and there are several tutorials available on the internet to create custom terrains.

== Plot ==
The two opposing factions introduced in Dark Reign 2 are the Jovian Detention Authority a.k.a. JDA (which evolve to be the Imperium faction) and the Sprawlers (which later evolve to be the Freedom Guard faction of Dark Reign). The two sides are caught up in a conflict spanning Earth's 26th (and final) century. In the introduction, a Sprawler Leader who interacts with the player in the Sprawler campaign states:

The struggle between JDA and the Sprawlers is, at its heart, the struggle between authority and freedom, government and proletariat. As the earth reeled into ecological collapse, the JDA established large dome cities to protect the citizenry from the harsh conditions outside. However, they left behind all those who would not succumb to their dictatorial will: the Sprawlers. The disenfranchised Sprawlers are thus left in the outside world, bathed in the harsh conditions of a dying planet and fueled by the explosive rage of rebels fighting for a free life under the thumb of a cold overlord. Thus, the Sprawlers desperately fight to break into the dome cities, while the JDA desperately sally out into the decaying 'Sprawl' to keep them out and in a state of submission.

The player can choose to play either the JDA or the Sprawlers campaign, both with similarities and differences to the overall story. In the JDA campaign, the player is a member of strike force, guided by the JDA central AI, "CYGNET". In the Sprawlers campaign, the player is referred to as "Sirdar", a new member of the council eager to prove their worth. Both sides are concerned with the massive increase in seismic activity around the world which is consuming it and each other. As the story progresses, both sides gain access to new units and structures which the player will need to use in order to proceed further and develop more powerful strategies.

=== JDA plot ===
Activity in the city is going wild with Sprawlers making regular skirmishes and setting up anti-air batteries that harass air traffic. The situation in Sector 13 is the worst. After being shot down by one of the batteries, Strike Force's first objective is to rescue a base from destruction, push back Sprawler forces and clearing all the anti-air batteries in the area so that an air strike can be performed on the Sprawler base. Along the way, the first earthquake occurs, almost destroying the base Strike Force rescues.

In the next mission, the JDA also discover Togra's shrine has been damaged in the quake. They wish to investigate. Strike Force captures a Voodun priest as a prisoner and force him to take them to the shrine. But along the way, powerful Togran pylons prevent movement up the hill without being destroyed. To deal with this, Strike Force deploys aerial infantry to destroy two Togran power generators in order to disable the pylons and proceed. At the site, they discover a strange mobile artifact, which resembles an ancient slab on a hovering platform. Cygnet indicates the higher up ranks wish to study the artifact and orders Strike Force to evacuate the artifact to a transporter.

Shortly after, radio chatter shows the evacuation plans are in effect and there is a state of panic. In one jungle area, a large JDA force is evacuating without authorization and are primarily concerned with themselves. Their plans make them abandon their post at a large powered gate, which is meant to prevent hordes of Sprawlers from entering the zone. Strike Force is sent in to deal with the cowards before they can escape, which is followed by pushing back the Sprawlers and building power generators on the gate, reactivating it. With the JDA's grip on the sector regained, Strike Force is relocated.

It is at that time found that there are three Togran artifacts. Strike Force is tasked with retrieving the second artifact hidden in a temple but along the way, encounter heavy resistance with suicidal cultists of unknown origin, as well as Baron Samedi's, traditionally a Sprawler power from the Shrine. Despite this, Strike force is able to locate and evacuate the artifact. Afterward, the challenge is on to find the third. This is achieved by a large offensive in Arctic mountains to capture Booda Shun, the Voodun High Priest, who reveals the location of the third artifact. Hidden in a city sector, Strike Force must find it before the Sprawlers do. The problem is not only pushing back the Sprawlers, but taking punishment from the frequent earthquakes in the zone.

Toward the end, the evacuation plan is in the final stages. However, the JDA does not wish for the artifacts to be taken into the hands of the Sprawlers, along with the Sprawlers leaving with them. They try to destroy all three artifacts, but can't for three reasons. First, a large destructive force is required to destroy them. Second, they have to be destroyed at the same time. Finally, destroying the artifacts will bring about the end of the world. During the final stage, as the last JDA citizens are being evacuated, Cygnet requests that Strike Force sacrifice themselves by remaining behind and destroying the artifacts, achieving this by gathering them around a large number of atomic energy plants before detonating them. It ends with the defeat of the Sprawlers, the salvation of the JDA as the Imperium, the destruction of Earth and the loss of Strike Force. This brings the JDA Campaign to a rather abrupt end. This is the canonical ending and sets the background for the prequel of Dark Reign: The Future of War and the expansion pack.

=== Sprawler plot ===
The Sprawlers are running low on numbers and have been on the defensive for a long time. The council heavily squabbles on going offensive or staying defensive, noting they can't stay on the defensive forever. A new Sirdar (the player) begins by aiding them in a more important offensive than the skirmishes of recent, hacking a communication centre feeding a city zone JDA propaganda so that the Sprawlers can spread their own message. They are the first to notice that seismic activity on Earth is increasing on a global scale and taking advantage by making a strike on a crippled base, bringing their first victory.

During the quake, they discover that the door seal of Togra's shrine, the research lab of the great Togra himself, has opened despite only being openable by Togra. According to legends, the breaking of the seal signals the beginning of a chain of events. The Sirdar must then send forces through icey mountains to rescue the Voodun high priest, Booda Shun, from JDA captivity and take him to the shrine so he can examine the site.

After interpreting the site, Booda Shun brings disturbing news. The breaking of the seal indicates that Earth's time is limited and "the planet is rolling toward a catastrophic collapse", which will bring the end of everything. During the previous mission, JDA forces were snooping around the site, which indicates they may have find something or are making plans. Sirdar is ordered to hack into the nearby Cygnet relay station to see what the JDA have in mind. After infiltrating the station despite heavy resistance before and after, the station is destroyed and the council reviews the information.

The plans reveal the JDA are relocating massive numbers of citizens to the central dome. Activity in the area is increasing at phenomenal rates. The purpose is clear. The JDA are preparing to evacuate Earth, leaving the Sprawlers behind. The council is outraged. As one member says: "First they ruin the planet and then they leave us to die with it". He declares death to the JDA and asks who is with him. With this, the whole council unites and puts their squabbling behind. But they find that the dome could have been assaulted easily years ago. Because of how much harder the direct way is to penetrate at the current time, they find the only possible way through is along the coast, which passes through two sub-factions, known as the Breks and the Judas.

The Sirdar is charged with leading the way. After securing the river and earning the Breks trust, thanks to new aerial and water technologies, they find the JDA have a secret weapons facility not far ahead from intel by their new allies. A prototype mobile bomb sits outside. Sirdar, if careful, is able to make off with three copies of the prototype, though only one is required. Then the sprawlers aid the Judas in taking out JDA forces that are thinning their numbers, gaining their trust.

With their forces built, the final missions involve storming the dome and preventing the JDA from being able to evacuate. If successful, the Sprawlers will become the dominant force and the JDA will be either severely crippled or destroyed.

== Reception ==
Dark Reign 2 underperformed commercially, and journalists Mark Asher and Tom Chick noted that it "didn't even hit PC Data's charts". Writing for CNET Gamecenter, Asher reported in September 2000 that the game's sales in the United States had reached 9,770 units, which drew revenues of $443,406. He remarked, "Activision has to be disappointed with that".

== Source code leak ==
In 2011, an unauthorized leak of the complete source code tree to the game was made public on the Internet and posted to a Google Code repository by a claimed former Pandemic Studios developer under a LGPL license. A Hacker News user received confirmation from the repository owner that this was in fact a leak and not an officially sanctioned code release. The leak also included headers and code from third-party sources with licenses that explicitly forbid public disclosure and redistribution.
