= Josh Resnick =

American video game producer

Josh Resnick is an American video game producer.

== Education ==
Resnick received a Bachelor of Arts from Pomona College in 1989 and a Master of Business Administration from the Wharton School of the University of Pennsylvania in 1993.

== Career ==
Resnick spent four years at Activision. He was the co-founder and president of video game development studio Pandemic Studios, which was bought by Electronic Arts in 2008. In 2012, Resnick and his fiancé Rosie O'Neill co-founded Sugarfina, a luxury candy boutique, with Resnick becoming its chief executive officer.
