= Dark Reign: The Future of War =

1997 video game

- Developer: Auran
- Publisher: Activision
- Directors: Greg Lane (Auran), Josh Resnick (Activision)
- Producer: Greg Borrud
- Designer: Trey Watkins
- Programmers: Carl Chimes; Ian Lane Davis; Andrew Cooper
- Artists: Jacob Hutson; Rodney Walden
- Writer: Robert Berger
- Composer: Jeehun Hwang
- Platforms: Microsoft Windows; Xbox 360
- Release: Microsoft Windows: NA: September 17, 1997; EU: September 24, 1997; Xbox 360: WW: January 27, 2013
- Genre: Real-time strategy
- Modes: Single-player, multiplayer

Dark Reign: The Future of War is a real-time strategy video game for Microsoft Windows, developed by Auran and published by Activision in 1997. The game consists of a large single-player campaign but also supports multiplayer online games. A mission construction kit is included with the game, which allows players to create new maps for multiplayer games and create entire missions and campaigns.

Dark Reign was critically and commercially successful, with global sales of 685,000 units by 2004. An expansion pack, Dark Reign: Rise of the Shadowhand, was released on March 26, 1998, which added new missions and new units to the game. A prequel, Dark Reign 2, was released on July 3, 2000.

== Gameplay ==
The gameplay is that of a sci-fi real-time strategy, similar to that of Command & Conquer. In any given scenario, the player first constructs buildings for unit production, resource gathering, power generation and base defense. The production of units and buildings represent an opportunity cost as they all have an associated cost in terms of credits (the currency used by the game). Additional credits are earned by collecting shipments of water from fresh springs, while additional power can be generated by harvesting Taelon. Water and Taelon are the only two resources collected during gameplay. These resource deposits continuously regenerate and can never be completely exhausted, however, when depletion occurs, resource accumulation from these sources takes longer. In a special case, the complete destruction of water sources can be forced through the use of the Water Contamination Unit as part of a resource-denial strategy. During short games, it is advised to assert control over as many water deposits as possible to ensure a strong income in financing attacks and base defenses. In longer games, this strategy is extended to protecting and maintaining supply routes as it takes longer to derive the same amount of profit.

The two sides have completely unique units and strategies, unlike many contemporary games. Freedom Guard units are characterized as being weaker but more mobile, being faster and better able to handle difficult terrain. As such, these units specialize in lightning strikes and ambushes and are useful in harassing enemy units and supply lines. Imperium units rely on strength and numbers to overwhelm their enemies. Although their units are usually slower when compared to Freedom Guard counterparts, they are able to outmatch Freedom Guard units with increased armor and firepower. Furthermore, Imperium units have a greater reliance on hover technology, which limits their use in extreme terrain but allows them to easily cross natural water barriers. Freedom Guard technology relies on hiding their units through use of technology called phasing. Phasing allows units to quickly hide underground, making them effective for close-quarters ambushes. The Imperium are directed more towards a blitzkrieg style of play, with units focused on supremacy in combat ahead of tactical flexibility. Freedom Guard units are geared more towards an anti-armor role, especially to counter Imperium armor superiority, while the Imperium utilize more anti-infantry weapons to negate Freedom Guard infantry advantages.

Players can steal technology from other players, thus negating specific unit advantages and specialty. In order to do this, the player uses an espionage unit called the Infiltrator to steal weapon designs from an enemy Headquarters, the building tasked with producing construction rigs. Once the plans have been successfully stolen, the infiltrator unit is then directed back to the player's HQ to incorporate the new technology in their production options. The Infiltrator may steal as many weapon designs as possible while in the enemy headquarters but risks being exposed the longer the unit stays.

In the campaign missions, the player is given a number of objectives that must be met before victory can be achieved. These victory conditions follow the historical scenario being replayed - for example, a given mission might require the player, as the Freedom Guard, to evacuate or protect a particular unit or structure, or as the Imperium, to destroy those units or prevent their escape.

Dark Reign possesses a complex fog-of-war where line of sight is affected by varying terrain height and shape. This allows for the use of forests for ambushes and limits the effectiveness of recon in densely forested or mountainous areas. Like many RTS titles, structures in the game consume power and do not function if sufficient power is unavailable. Players can 'power down' buildings to keep their bases online, giving greater flexibility in base management. The game also features production queues, and where multiple production facilities of the same type exist, they automatically divide up production, or can be ordered to each focus on particular production queues.

A player can place any number of paths, each with any number of points, and save each one with a unique name. Units on a path can be assigned to patrol it, loop, or travel to it once, and units automatically carry out behaviours at each point - for example, a resource collector can be given a path to take it around an enemy base to a water deposit and it will treat this route as its standard resource gathering path. Separate from waypoints, units can be given individual orders such as "search and destroy", "harass", or "scout", allowing them to choose their own targets, engaging and occupying the enemy while freeing up the player to work on more significant strategies or development. These tactics can be controlled further with the use of individually customisable AI settings for every unit, allowing the player to set unit pursuit range, damage tolerance (how quickly the unit will seek healing / repairs and flee combat), and independence (how far the unit will stray from orders in order to engage attackers or targets of opportunity). These can be set individually for every unit, and the default setting can be changed, eliminating the need to change every unit if a unified strategy calls for particular settings.

== Plot ==
The game takes place in the distant future. The player takes the role of a survivor of a faction of humans known as the Tograns, whose society was decimated after their homeworld became engulfed in the civil war between the Freedom Guard and the Imperium (who were once both the Sprawlers and the Jovian Detention Authority (JDA) from Dark Reign 2 respectively). As one of the last remaining Tograns that set off in hopes they might find a new refuge to rebuild and carry on the words of Alpheus Togra (a famous research scientist and philosopher), the player is presented with an opportunity to go back through time and prevent Togra's death, using an advanced probe launched by him just prior to the destruction of the planet Strata-7. To use the device, the player must first demonstrate their worth by achieving victory in simulations of famous battles between the Imperium and the Freedom Guard.

The thirteen missions play out the events from the first skirmish between the Imperium and Freedom Guard up to the battle for and destruction of Strata-7. The missions may freely be played from the perspective of the Imperium or the Freedom Guard. In the thirteenth and final mission, the last Togran, the player, is sent back in time using the Chronomachine to Strata-7, and must use the weapons and technology of both the Imperium and the Freedom Guard to combine a force that will defeat both sides and prevent the complete destruction of Strata-7 and the death of Togra.

In the expansion, Rise of the Shadowhand, the story depicts the increasing desperation and despotism of the Imperium after the emergence of the Tograns as a third credible faction. After a massive Imperium assault on Freedom Guard space, a fleeing transport stumbles upon a planet, at the other side of the galaxy, where the Imperium secret police, the Shadowhand, have conducted major research. By coincidence, the Shadowhand simultaneously is faced with losing control of its advanced units due to the malfunction of their guiding AI, Osiris.

== Development ==
Dark Reign began life as a game called Corporation: Offworld. Developed by Auran's co-founder Greg Lane, Corporation: Offworld and its sister game entitled Wild West were demonstrated to Activision in June 1996 and a deal had been signed shortly thereafter. Auran continued development of the Tactics Engine under Greg Lane while Activision layered a new story on top of Corporation: Offworld and Dark Reign was born. Many of the units, and the unit AI, innovative tile-blending system, map systems, production systems and real time line of sight were already present in Corporation: Offworld when it was first demonstrated to Activision in 1996.

Magnetar Games released Dark Reign Redux, an adapted port of the original Dark Reign, on Xbox Live Indie Games in January 2013. The project originally started as a fan remake, until it got licensed and approved by Activison. The game contains all twelve missions of the main game. The game was later taken down by Magnetar Games as the result of licensing negotiations.

== Reception ==
=== Critical response ===
Reception

Review scores
Publication	Score
Computer Games Strategy Plus	3.5/5
Computer Gaming World	4/5
Edge	8/10
Next Generation	4/5
PC Gamer (UK)	92%
PC Gamer (US)	89%
PC PowerPlay	94%

Edge praised the game's three dimensional terrain because it affects the movement speed of the player's units as well as their line of sight, concluding that Dark Reign "takes the realtime strategy wargames just that little bit further, and is a very fine game on its own right." GamePro hailed it as a strong entry in the genre, citing the simple interface, challenging A.I., impressive cut scenes, and mission editor. Next Generation stated that "As a whole, Dark Reign is one of the better strategy games to come across our reviews desk in a long time. By combining the best elements of past hits with a slew of new features and a wonderful mission editor, Dark Reign is sure to please." French magazine Backstab gave the game a positive review, lauding its visuals and AI.

=== Sales ===
Dark Reign was a commercial success at launch, and Activision declared the game its fastest-selling product by that time. In the United States, it debuted on PC Data's computer game sales rankings at #4 for September 1997, the highest position for a strategy game that month. It fell to 14th place the following month, and was absent from PC Data's top 20 by November. Dark Reign had "led charts overseas as well, scoring number one positions in both Germany and Australia during certain periods" by mid-November, according to PC Gamer US. As of that date, shipments to retailers had surpassed 400,000 units globally. The game's sell-through in the United States totaled 78,600 units by the end of 1997, which placed it behind competitors Total Annihilation and Age of Empires over the same period.

Dark Reign's global sales reached roughly 500,000 units by June 1999. At the time, Barry Stavro of the Los Angeles Times noted that it had become "a big hit in Germany and Australia". Its worldwide sales ultimately numbered 685,000 units by 2004, for revenues above $12 million.

== Legacy ==
The Construction Kit shipped with the game allows the creation of anything from multiplayer / skirmish maps to full-fledged campaigns. Tools supplied with it allow for custom-created AI profiles to be created easily and scripted events to be implemented. As a result, there was a large community and several mods, including total conversions such as 'Edge Of Darkness', which added two new races and a host of new units and strategies.

=== Expansion packs ===
Rise of the Shadowhand cover art.

Dark Reign: Rise of the Shadowhand was released on March 26, 1998. The expansion includes a new campaign, along with new maps and terrains. It also features two new sides, Xenite and Shadowhand, resulting in a total of four playable factions. Each of the new factions contains its own units and buildings which expand upon what was available via the original factions, with the Shadowhand including and expanding upon Imperium units and buildings from the original game, and with the Xenite doing the same for the Freedom Guard.

Battles of the Outer Rim was released in 1998. It was developed by Macmillan Digital Publishing USA. It includes six single player missions, 79 multiplayer maps and a searchable map browser.

=== Multiplayer Community ===
Dark Reign continued to be supported for over 20 years following its original release with an open-source client being maintained on a community website.

=== Prequel ===
Dark Reign was followed by the prequel Dark Reign 2 in 2000.
