= Special effects of The Dark Knight =

The Dark Knight is a 2008 superhero film directed by Christopher Nolan from a screenplay he co-wrote with his brother Jonathan. Based on the DC Comics superhero Batman, it is the sequel to Batman Begins (2005) and the second installment in The Dark Knight Trilogy. In the film's plot, the superhero vigilante Batman, Police Lieutenant James Gordon and District Attorney Harvey Dent form an alliance to dismantle organized crime in Gotham City, but their efforts are derailed by the intervention of an anarchistic mastermind, the Joker, who seeks to test how far Batman will go to save the city from complete chaos. The ensemble cast includes Christian Bale, Michael Caine, Heath Ledger, Gary Oldman, Aaron Eckhart, Maggie Gyllenhaal, and Morgan Freeman.

Nolan avoided using computer-generated imagery (CGI) unless necessary, insisting on practical stunts such as flipping an 18-wheel truck and blowing up a factory.

== Design ==
Unlike the design process on Batman Begins, which had been restrained by a need to represent Batman iconography, audience acceptance of its realistic setting gave The Dark Knight more leeway. Chris Corbould returned as special effects supervisor. He described The Dark Knight as "the Batman I always wanted to make, but we had to step over Batman Begins to get to it. I am a desperate modernist. I like simplicity. On Batman Begins, I struggled with trying to make sure we didn't destroy the comic book-ness ... I'm grateful for [Nolan] because he burned everything down [at the end of] Batman Begins."

=== Batpod ===
Nolan developed the Batpod, also known as the Batcycle, because he did not want to heavily reuse the Tumbler. He decided on a two-wheeled vehicle but did not consider it a motorcycle because it was more "exotic and powerful-looking than a traditional motorcycle." He developed a design by combining different commercial model components in his garage office alongside production designer Nathan Crowley who did the designs, and built a full-size version from various construction hardware. He recalled sneaking onto the Warner Bros. lot to steal two Tumbler tires to use in the model. He flew Corbould from England to help as he had overseen the design of the Tumbler. Corbould believed the design was "bizarre-looking" and would never work, and set about making it functional because the 508 millimeter wide tires would make it difficult to maneuver. His team had developed a prototype within four weeks, using a gyro-stabilized gimbal to help it remain upright, and a main body that required the driver to lie flat. The engine was concealed within the body, exhaust systems into the chassis, and radiators were disguised as footpads. The wide tires were angled outward to make a narrower surface area when in contact with the road, improving its turning ability.

A Warner Bros. executive suggested detaching the Batpod from the main Tumbler body. Nolan wanted to achieve the Batpod emerging from the Tumbler remains practically, and Corbould's crew developed a rig that could move the Tumbler wheels into the Batpod mod and create enough momentum to make it appear to explode out of the old one with some minor CGI enhancement. Six Batpods were built in total in case any were destroyed in crashes. Steering was controlled by shoulder instead of hand, and the body on which the rider lies could move up and down.

Stuntman Jean Pierre Goy was the only person capable of riding it, spending months training in its use. During filming, Goy wore the full Batman costume plus a custom crash-helmet resembling the mask. The cape was a point of concern due to the risk of it getting caught in the rear tire. Hemming and her crew developed a prototype backpack that could automatically retract the cape, but Corbould suggested performing a test run with the normal cape with an easily tearable release in case it did get caught. In motion, the cape flowed over the tire safely and the backpack idea was instead used for Batman's Hong Kong infiltration. Goy had to ride the Batpod at up to 80 MPH, only falling off once. Bale was also eager to try it out but could not control it and when shown riding it is actually being dragged behind cars at 60 MPH.

=== Batsuit ===
Hemming, Crowley, and Nolan fully re-designed the Batsuit to answer the challenges faced by Bale with the previous incarnation that made it uncomfortable and inflexible and hot because of the rubberized materials plus body chemistry damaged the suit. Its rigidity also made it difficult to sit down so it was physically demanding on Bale and the head and neck were difficult to move. Hemming worked on the redesign with concept artist Jamie Rama, rendering over 20 different concepts to create a streamlined design composed of smaller plates of armor with open spaces. Urethane was used to replace the easily damaged foam latex and neoprene of the original, and a material normally used in medical and sportswear that was lighter, more flexible, and more breathable.

Several prototypes were worked on for the neck, separating the head from the neck, but instead of the cowl and neck extending down into the suit as it had, the neckpiece was part of the suit and came up to meet the cowl. The cowl jaw area was scaled down to blend it with the scaled-down neck. The new mask is modelled after a motorcycle helmet. The final suit involved casting and molding over 100 individual pieces compared to Begins one big piece of molded latex. The new suit is made of 200 individual pieces of rubber, fiberglass, and nylon and metallic mesh. The urethane also served as a light armor for stunts, but it was not any lighter than the original. The blades on the suit's gauntlet were also retractable and launchable.

=== The Joker ===
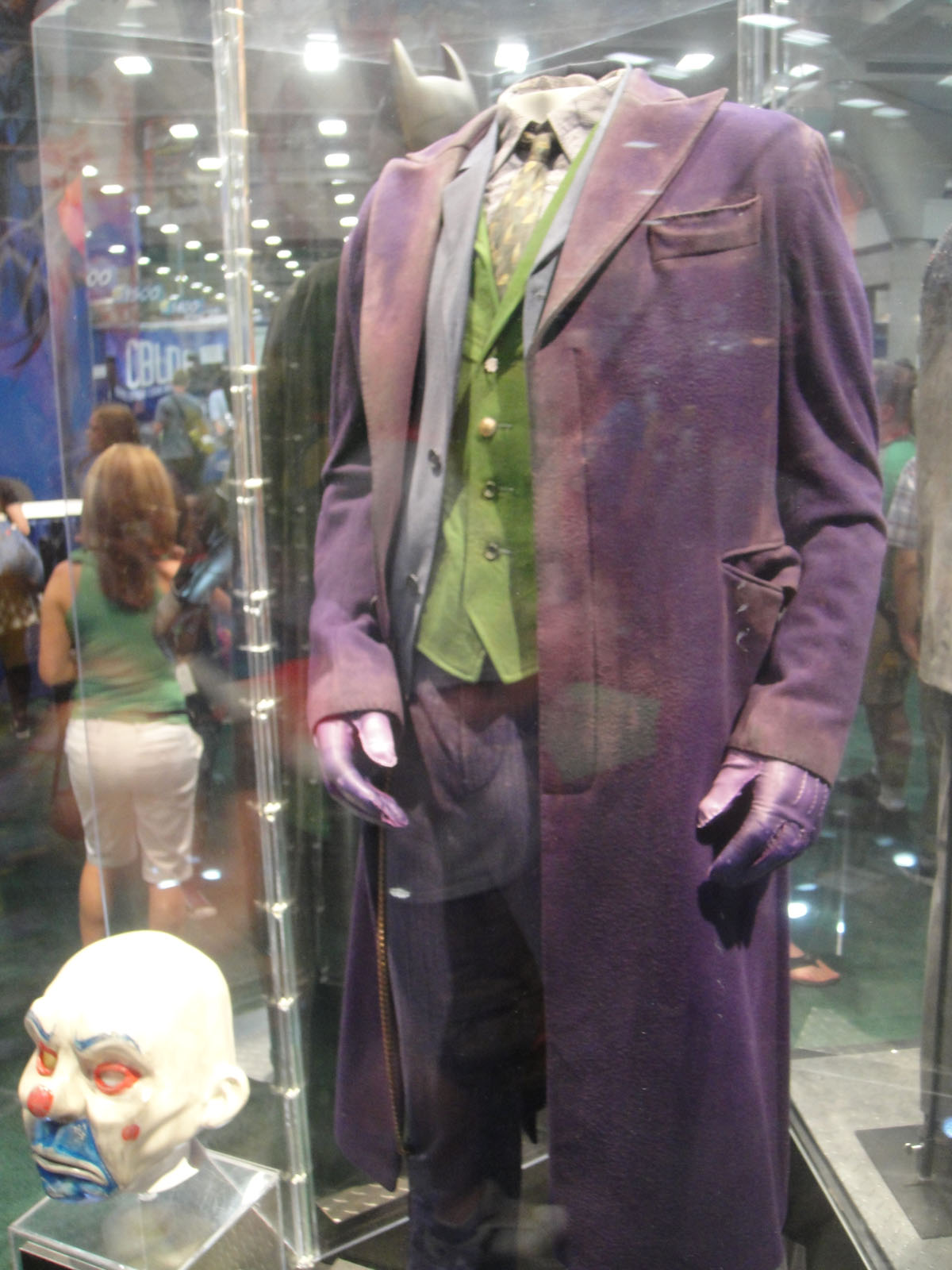
Heath Ledger's Joker costume on display at the 2011 San Diego Comic-Con alongside the mask the character uses during the opening bank robbery.

Hemming also designed the Joker's outfit. Although she looked at Nicholson's costuming, Hemming considered that the character would be portrayed by a younger and modern male and wanted his look to be something audiences could identify with and was believable. She looked at images from Vivienne Westwood which were generally brightly colored, radical lines, and geometric prints as well as images of Johnny Rotten, Iggy Pop, and Pete Doherty. She wanted the Joker to appear like a vagrant who does not care about or look after himself. Nolan also had her team look at the 1953 painting Study after Velázquez's Portrait of Pope Innocent X by Francis Bacon, which to him communicated the Joker's edge and unsettling essence. Hemming wanted a single, identifiable costume, a purple coat and green vest complimented with additional disguises and masks. Twenty Joker coats and vests were made as well of multiples of his shirt which was based on an antique shirt she found. Turnbull & Asser, responsible for James Bond's shirt and ties, wove a custom fabric for the character's tie after Ledger suggested a thin, 1960s style one. "The first place that I looked [for inspiration] was obviously pictures of the Joker in past graphic novels, comic books, films, whatever, and then after that, I started to think, 'Well, how could someone be like this?'" explains Hemming. "Then I wanted to contemporize it, so I started looking in fashion." Hemming says another element of inspiration came from the world of punk rock. "You say, 'What's the rationale for him being able to dress like this?' That's when I started looking at the pop world and I ended up looking at the Sex Pistols and Johnny Rotten," says Hemming. "I was just thinking, 'Well, there are plenty of guys out there who actually are as extreme as this, and there's nothing wrong with doing it.' You've got to make it look like someone really dresses like this. It can't just be, 'Hello, I'm putting on my costume.' It's got to be wherever he lives and whatever he's been doing, he's been wearing that."

His makeup and styling was rationalized as him being disfigured first and over time going crazier until he starts covering the scars and eventually his entire face in makeup, while his green hair was a "bleach job that had gone terribly, terribly wrong." Prosthetics supervisor Conor O'Sullivan created the scars by researching different types of scarring. He said "the skin has a nape... just like fabric does. If it's cut one way there will be minimal scarring, another way it is very difficult to heal which is what happened to the Joker." O'Sullivan was not given a concept or reason for the scarring, and developed ideas with influence from the punk and skinhead era, unsavory people he had met, and a delivery driver with similar scarring to the final Joker makeup. Using Hemming's concept art, he developed three different scar versions and with Nolan's approval he developed one that amalgamated all three and molded to produce the applications. Using a transferring technique he had initially conceived of on The Last Samurai, he produced silicone molds from which soft and skin-like applications could be made. These could generally be applied directly to the skin while in the mold to make sure they were always fitted to the same place, rather than just fitting them by hand after taking them out of the mold. This preserved the delicate blending edges and the integrity of the sculpture while allowing for very soft pieces. Blending makeup was then added. This process made it harder to produce the applications but in turn only took 25 minutes to apply. The whole bottom lip is fake according to Ledger.

Makeup artist John Caglione sketched eight clown makeup concepts using photos of Ledger for the makeup which Nolan wanted to look "organic" instead of clean or refined. To look like he's worn it for days and slept in it." Nolan provided a book featuring other Bacon paintings for inspiration. “The corrupted clown face is built into the icon of the Joker, but we gave a Francis Bacon spin to it. This corruption, this decay in the texture of the look itself. It's grubby. You can almost imagine what he smells like,” Nolan said. Once a concept was finalized, Caglione performed tests on Ledger using a theater makeup technique in which Ledger wrinkled up his face, raising his eyebrows and crinkled his crows feet, and then the area was painted over. Once Ledger relaxed his face it created cracks and textures. During filming the pair used the same technique with Caglione adding layers of white and gray. Caglione used a dry face paint activated with alcohol which made it dry quickly and stay on all day. Kryolan Aquacolor black makeup was smudged around Ledger's eyes and sprayed with water to create smears. Ledger always applied the lipstick himself because he believed it was essential to his character. Makeup took a further 15 to 20 minutes. The makeup was not applied in a uniform way but based on the context of the story, such as being more smeared for the bank heist scene because the character would be sweating more, while it was neater for his introduction the mafia leaders. It took about an hour to 90 mins to get the whole makeup process done.

== Visual effects ==
=== Effects ===
Visual effects company Double Negative provided the 700 different effect shots needed for The Dark Knight, which Nolan used only as a last resort. This figure was relatively small compared to other contemporary films, but the significantly larger IMAX resolution made the respective task longer to complete. The prologue was used as a test, with Double Negative adding CGI detritus and debris as the school bus breaks through the wall.

Double Negative provided CGI views of Gotham from Wayne's penthouse to the green screen material and some minor enhancements such as lampposts ripping out of the ground and a CGI helicopter crashing into the ground during the truck chase and the Batpod driving up a wall and turning around. It also digitally enhanced the water around the ferries to make it more active, and filled in city backgrounds to be denser. Double Negative also provided the animated digital Batman swooping onto the Prewitt building and a digital establishing shot of a skyscraper based on the Trump Tower in Chicago as well as digital views when looking out from the tower.

New Deal Studios built 1/4 scale miniatures which were used for shots of Batman blowing up a corner of the Hong Kong high-rise using pyrotechnics with breakaway glass. They also refurbished the original 1/3 scale Tumbler radio-controlled model from Batman Begins including upgrading the steering for more control, used to embellish parts of the car chase such as the Batmobile crashing into a garbage truck. It also built a 1/3 scale fiberglass model to hit the garbage truck miniature. The vehicles were attached to steel skates that were pulled together by a cable beneath a 120 ft long miniature replica of the Lower Wacker location. Ten feet short of the miniature vehicles making contact, the crew released the garbage truck allowing it to fly erratically forward. Double Negative cleaned up the miniature photography and augmented the Lower Wacker model with a 3D model of the location.

Framestore provided effect shots for the Hong Kong IMAX sequences, including an animated Batman (made by Double Negative) moving between the city's rooftops and a digital Lau Chin for when the pair prepare to be picked up by a C130, although the following stunt was done for real. The Batman model was also used in a digital recreation of Bruce's penthouse when he leaps after Rachel, as it and the surrounding views were digital as the pair tumble to the ground.

=== Two-Face ===
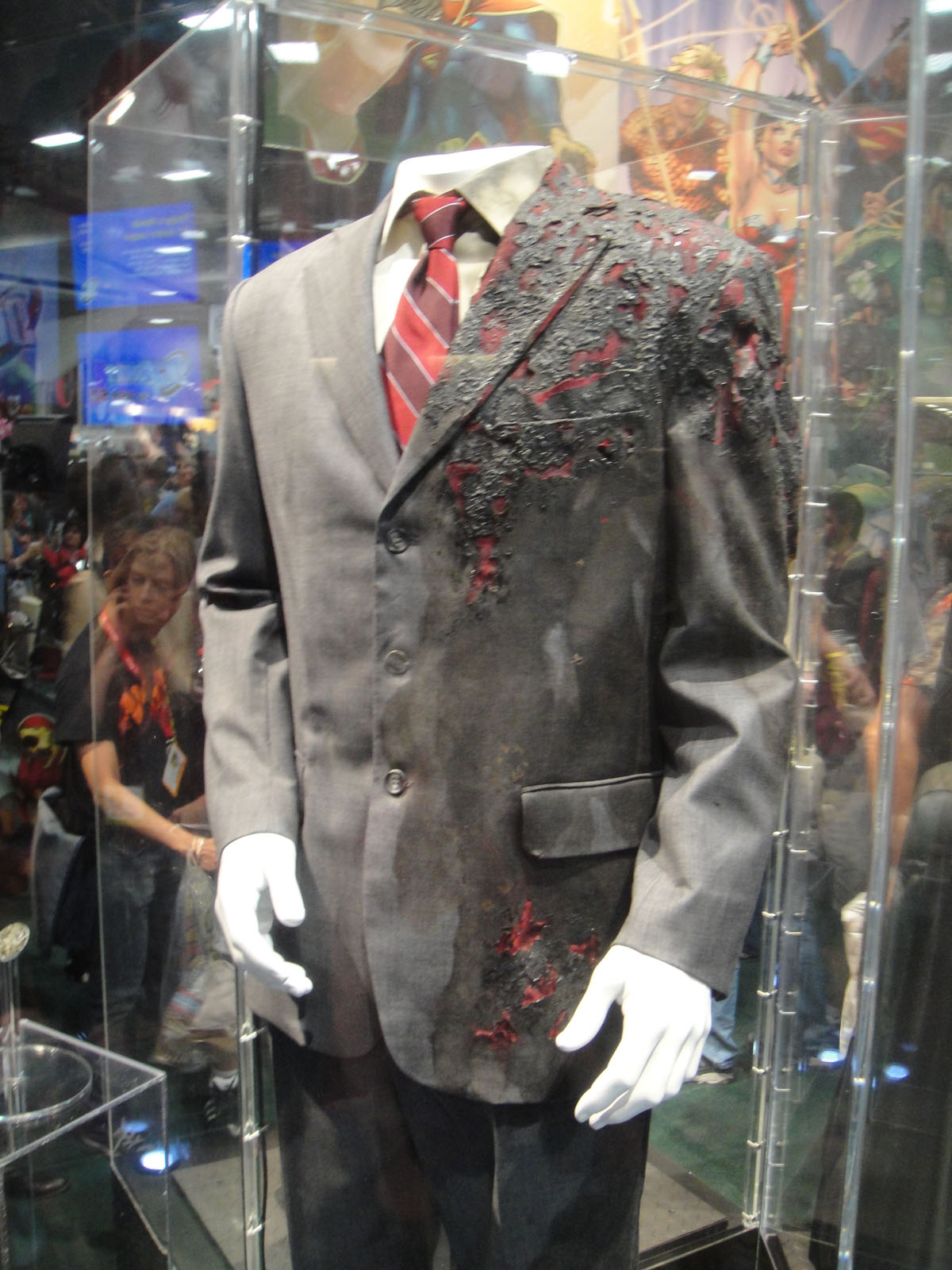
(Left) Aaron Eckhart with make-up and motion capture markers on set. Below is the finished effect. (Right) The Two-Face suit had a red lining so that once damaged it could appear to have almost fused to Harvey Dent's burned face.

The Two-Face design was developed by sculptor Julian Murray based on Nolan's desire for a skeletal appearance without making it too gruesome. Murray studied the character as he appeared in Batman: The Animated Series (1992–1995) and identified key aspects of his appearance, including an exposed eye and teeth. Some of the designs were considered too real and horrifying, and were refined to something more fanciful and detailed without being as repulsive. Nolan preferred practical effects but accepted that his intended design would not work without CGI. He also understood that prosthetics could restrict Eckhart's acting. Nolan believed that makeup would add to Eckhart's face when he wanted to reduce the size of his face like that of a real burn victim.

Murray built a maquette of Eckhart's head to develop the design. He used the maquette to build facial molds that the makeup team could use to create a custom bald half-skullcap that would conceal Eckhart's hair on the burnt side of Two-Face's face. The skullcap molds were baked in a mold every filming day and took about an hour to apply, including half an hour to deal for hair and another for general makeup and markers. Eckhart wore a series of black-and-white markers on the left side of his face that visual effects company Framestore could use to track his facial movements when adding in the Two-Face effects. Pfister lit Two-Face differently than he lit Dent, giving him a moodier, darker lighting scheme.

Framestore produced 120 Two-Face shots, building and tracking a CG model of Dent's burned face over Eckhart's performance. Artists then digitally painted each frame to blend the damaged and intact sides seamlessly. Framestore acknowledged they rearranged the positions of bones, muscles and joints to make the character look more dramatic. For each shot, three 720-pixel HD cameras were set up at different angles on set to fully capture Eckhart's performance. Framestore also integrated shots of Bale and Eckhart into shots of the exploding building where Dent is burned. It was difficult simulating fire on Eckhart because it is inherently unrealistic for only half of something to burn. To establish Dent's polished, debonair look, the costume team dressed Eckhart in custom-made Zegna suits. Working backward from the explosion that scars Dent, designer Lindy Hemming chose a gray suit with red lining so that, when burned, the fabric would appear fused and melted into the red-and-black pattern of his injuries, allowing the transformation into Two-Face without using two separate costumes.

== Stunts ==
=== Bank heist ===
The scene opens with a pair of robbers (stuntmen Tom Struthers and Kevin Mathews) ziplining from a 400 ft high adjacent building to the Post Office. The Post Office, a registered historic building, could not be damaged, so for the bus crash segment a false wall was built inside the Post Office for it to be pulled through on a pneumatic rig, and because the bus was too large to get through the building door, it had to be disassembled outside and rebuilt inside.

=== Truck flip ===
Corbould tried to dissuade Nolan from the 18-wheeler truck flip, because of the uncertainties of conducting the stunt on a public street, and failed to convince him to use a smaller vehicle such as a SWAT van. Corbould agreed to perform a test and if it worked they would proceed but otherwise they would rely on CGI. Veteran stunt driver Jim Wilkey drove the vehicle in Joker makeup with a fire suit and helmet inside a reinforced cabin. He manually pressed a button to activate a large piston in the back of the truck that would flip it, which worked in testing. On location the area was much narrower and because of manhole access there was only 60 feet of solid ground on which the stunt could take place. Corbould hid in an alleyway during the stunt as he was afraid it would fail but it worked the first time and only one take was required. The scene was shot for IMAX with five cameras, plus another one on the truck itself.

The truck chase scene was filmed in July, primarily on Wacker Drive, a multi-level street that was closed nightly for filming over three weeks. The scene was filmed in IMAX, and included a crashing armored truck and a SWAT van crashing through a concrete barricade, a scene added by Nolan during filming. Batman's Tumbler (Batmobile) intercepting a grenade involved the vehicle driving over a ramp that was removed with CGI, supplemented by scenes of the Tumbler crashing and exploding were filmed on a full-scale replica of Lower Wacker built at Cardington Airfield in England. The chase continued on to LaSalle Street, featuring a practical truck flip stunt, and helicopter sequence that was combined with CGI to show it crashing into the road. Additional segments were filmed on Monroe Street, Randolph Street, and Randolph Street Station. LaSalle Street was also used for the police funeral procession scene.

=== Hospital ===
Several months were spent scouting for a site that could be destroyed before finding the four-story former Brach's candy factory that was already scheduled for demolition. The hospital being destroyed was not scripted but Corbould believed it could be done and Nolan wrote it into the script. Explosives expert Doug Loizeaux of Controlled Demolition, Inc. planned the demolition to appear as if it was being exploded instead of imploded as in a typical demolition, and American Demolition set the explosives on key supporting columns with additional charges on the windows.

The visuals were enhanced with fire bars and debris. Two IMAX cameras plus a helicopter were used to capture the footage plus one focused only on Ledger and a Vistavision camera on the bus, but decided to use just the IMAX footage because the single long take worked better than switching angles. Low angles were used because they did not cause the effect to appear faked. The production was given only two hours to film the scene due to nearby Union Pacific and Metra train schedules, and after rehearsals, captured it as a single take in the final five minutes before trains began to pass. The heat and force of the explosion could be felt up to 1,500 ft away.

=== Pencil trick ===
One of the film's most famous and iconic scenes is the "pencil trick". When the Joker interrupts a meeting of Gotham's mob bosses, a henchman (portrayed by stunt man Charles Jarman) is sent to attack him, but the Joker slams his head onto a pencil sticking out of a table, piercing his eye and brain, killing him instantly.

The production crew initially considered prosthetics, and Crowley said that they could film the scene twice, one with and without the pencil, and composite the footage. A CGI pencil was also considered, but visual effects supervisor Nick Davis said that they avoided using CGI where possible because the digital recreations could not really match the IMAX image.

Instead, the stunt was done practically, with Jarman required to remove the pencil before his head struck the table, putting him at some risk because the pencil was stuck in the table. He performed a few half-speed rehearsals to refine the movement of Jarman sweeping his hand across to take the pencil while his head moved toward the table. The scene itself required 22 takes to meet Nolan's satisfaction. Jarman remarked that two different tables were used during filming, a real table, which Jarman preferred because it was not as solid as its replacement, and a padded table covered in a galvanized rubber surface which was denser and firmer. He described it as akin to running into a brick wall covered in a towel. Pfister remarked that the table was covered in wrinkles from the impact of Jarman's head.

Jarman said he was knocked unconscious three times, developing a large welt on his forehead after the first day of filming, but said he continued because he did not want to let the production down, but in a 2018 interview he admitted he would not do it again given the choice. Ledger, who remained in character on the set, broke character after realizing he had knocked Jarman out.

=== Other stunts ===
Exterior footage of the Gotham Prewitt Building, the site of Batman's and Joker's final confrontation, was filmed at the in-construction Trump International Hotel and Tower, but the owners refused permission to film a stunt of a SWAT team being neutralized by Batman and suspended from the building so this was filmed from the fortieth floor of a separate building site, using a hydraulic accelerator that dragged the stuntmen over the edge. The Joker's fall was performed by Ledger himself, at his insistence, lowering him 75 ft with a rapid fall rig down a 110 ft drop.

Scenes of Wayne driving and subsequently crashing his Lamborghini, were filmed along Wells Street, Lake Street, and Franklin Street. Stunt driver George Cottle performed the crash in a reinforced Lamborghini. A Randolph Street parking garage is where Batman captures the Scarecrow and copy-cat Batman. Nolan wanted Rottweillers in the scene, but it took some time to find a handler willing to manage several dogs simultaneously as the animals generally did not like each other. Stunt man Conway Wickliffe was killed in September 2007 while filming a chase sequence in England. He was a passenger in a four-wheel-drive pickup driving adjacent to a stunt car when it crashed into a tree. He was memorialized in the credits alongside Ledger.

== Accolades ==
At the 35th Saturn Awards, The Dark Knight won the award for Best Special Effects (Corbould, Nick Davis, Paul J. Franklin, Timothy Webber). For the 81st Academy Awards in 2009, it received nominations for Best Art Direction (Crowley and Peter Lando), Best Makeup (Caglione Jr. and O'Sullivan), and Best Visual Effects (Davis, Corbould, Webber, and Franklin).
