= Micah Wright =

American writer (born 1969)

- Born: Micah Ian War Dog Wright; 1969 (age 56–57)
- Areas: Writer, director, producer
- Notable works: Stormwatch: Team Achilles

Micah Ian War Dog Wright (born 1969) is a Native American writer who has worked in film, television, animation, video games and comic books. Wright started his career at Nickelodeon where he was an intern, script supervisor, and also a staff writer on The Angry Beavers. It was at Nickelodeon that he became friends with Jay Lender, with whom he would collaborate as a writing partner on numerous projects across various media. Wright got his start in comics with the short lived Stormwatch: Team Achilles. He came to public attention with his anti-war satire posters, which were later compiled into the bookYou Back the Attack, We'll Bomb Who We Want. After setbacks, Wright shifted his focus to video games. He co-wrote the titles Destroy All Humans! and Robocalypse with Jay Lender. A member of Writers Guild of America West, he chaired the Video Game Writers Caucus and helped establish the WGA’s first Video Game Writing Award in 2007. He also co-founded the WGA's Native American and World Indigenous Writers Committee. In 2015, he published Duster, a WWII-themed graphic novel crowdfunded on Kickstarter. He also consulted on virtual reality project TheBlu, which lead to a teaching role in virtual reality filmmaking. He co-directed They’re Watching (2016), a horror comedy, and served as Chief Content Manager (2017–2019) for the TV network First Nations Experience, overseeing its first original programming.

== Early life ==
Wright was born in Lubbock, Texas. He graduated from the University of Arizona with degrees in political science and creative writing. While in college, Wright was involved in a weekly sketch comedy show where he started out as a writer and eventually became a performer.

== Career ==
=== Animation and comics ===
After graduating and moving to Los Angeles, Wright started interning at Nickelodeon, before becoming script supervisor and eventually a staff writer on The Angry Beavers. In early 2000, a number of writers working on Nickelodeon cartoons contacted the Writers Guild of America to renegotiate the contracts on their behalf and organize a union. At the time, Wright, who also took part in the union drive, was creating, writing and producing the pilot for his own show, Constant Payne, an animated steampunk science fiction series following a crime-fighting scientist without powers, Alex 'Doc' Payne, as well as his teenage daughter, Amanda, co-produced with Madhouse, with an aesthetic inspired by anime (especially Cowboy Bebop and films by Satoshi Kon), pulp magazines and early Soviet propaganda posters. The show, which would have been Nickelodeon's first action adventure offering, was ultimately not ordered as a full series due to the network's fears of violent programming in the wake of the September 11 attacks as well as Nickelodeon's suspicions that Wright was one of the figureheads in the union organizing effort. Wright has since tried pitching Constant Payne to Warner Bros. Animation and to foreign studios as an animated feature-length film but the project remains incomplete. During his time at Nickelodeon, Wright became friends with Jay Lender, with whom he would collaborate as a writing partner on numerous projects across various media.

At San Diego Comic Con in 2001, Wright, who has been a fan of comics since childhood, was introduced to some of the editors of DC Comics' Wildstorm imprint through his friend, artist John Cassaday. Wright pitched his idea for a creator-owned G.I. Joe-type series, hoping to publish it through the Homage sub-imprint. The editors liked the concept but asked Wright to rework it to fit into the Wildstorm Universe, and the project was eventually developed into a new version of one of the imprint's founding titles, Stormwatch. Stormwatch: Team Achilles with art by Whilce Portacio, debuting in July 2002 under the "mature readers" sub-imprint Eye of the Storm, featured a UN-sanctioned team consisting primarily of human soldiers, created in response to the growing superhuman presence in the political areas of the Wildstorm Universe, particularly the events depicted in Mark Millar's run on The Authority. Despite consistent critical acclaim throughout its run, Stormwatch, like other Eye of the Storm titles, suffered from low sales and was ultimately cancelled few issues shy of Wright's planned 26-issue storyline. Shortly before the cancellation, the series took part in the line-wide crossover "Coup d'Etat" which saw The Authority take over the United States, forcing Team Achilles to go on the run.

Soon after the launch of Stormwatch: Team Achilles, Wright and artist Mark Robinson created a pitch for the revival of another Wildstorm property, DV8, which was rejected due to the low sales of the series' previous iteration and the creators' relatively unknown status. In 2003, Wright teamed up with artist Rick Remender to pitch a series focusing on the exploits of a low-ranking member of Advanced Idea Mechanics, a villainous organization operating within the Marvel Universe. The proposal, titled Joe A.I.M. and submitted for publication under Marvel's briefly revived Epic imprint, was rejected, prompting Wright to share his dissatisfaction with the Epic editorial on his Delphi message board, which resulted in a public dispute between him and Marvel's then-Editor-in-Chief Joe Quesada. In an interview later that year, Wright expressed regret for making the issue public. Other unproduced projects include American Cross with artist Niko Henrichon, a revenge story that takes place during the American Revolution, Lifer with artist Steve Pugh, a four-issue military sci-fi series described by Wright as "Starship Troopers meets Catch-22", Los Diablos with art by Taesoo Kim, a rejected weird western anime pitch repurposed into a comic book series. and Thunderhead!, an adult-oriented animated series co-created by Wright and Jay Lender.

=== Controversy and fallout ===
Outside of his work in animation and comics, Wright gained online popularity with a series of satirical military propaganda posters that combined the imagery of the World War II-era propaganda posters and the modern anti-war messages as slogans. Shortly after the 2003 invasion of Iraq, some of the posters were collected into a book, You Back the Attack, We'll Bomb Who We Want, with a foreword by Kurt Vonnegut and an introduction by Howard Zinn. Early printings of the book featured another introduction, where Wright described his experiences as a sergeant in the United States Army Rangers who had seen active combat in the 1989 invasion of Panama, a claim he had previously made discussing his military-themed series Stormwatch: Team Achilles in various interviews as well as responding to the criticism of his poster work online, and further elaborated upon while promoting You Back the Attack with a radio interview on Democracy Now! and a profile in The Washington Post. Wright's credentials were then questioned by actual Rangers, prompting them to contact The Post profile's author Richard Leiby, who began researching Wright's background. In April 2004, after Wright learned that Leiby was writing an exposé questioning his military service, he confessed that he had never been a Ranger, having only participated in the Reserve Officers' Training Corps, and apologized online.

The revelation resonated across the comic book industry, attracting responses from a number of industry figures including writers Steven Grant, Jeff Parker, Kurt Busiek and Mark Millar, as well as journalists Tom Spurgeon and Rich Johnston. According to Johnston, the mini-series Vigilante, which was supposed to be Wright's writing debut in the DC Universe, was already causing internal concern at the company due to the direction and tone of the title, as the titular character eschewed taking down street criminals or organized crime in favor of corporate criminals, and the controversy made it easier to take Wright off the book. Wright responded by stating that the quality of his work was not an issue. Meanwhile, Seven Stories Press, the publisher of You Back the Attack, removed Wright's introduction from the subsequent printings of the book and cancelled its follow-up volume, If You're Not a Terrorist... Then Stop Asking Questions, but eventually published the third collection of his poster work in 2006. That same year, the Vigilante mini-series, which was never officially confirmed as cancelled, was published with a new creative team and plotline. In a 2012 interview, Wright stated that following the controversy, he was privately told by the representatives of Marvel and DC that he has been blacklisted at both companies.

=== Video games and WGA ===
Since 2004, Wright has worked primarily in the field of video game writing, often with his long-time writing partner Jay Lender. The pair's shared credits include Looney Tunes: Back in Action for Electronic Arts, The Dukes of Hazzard: Return of the General Lee for Ubisoft, Destroy All Humans! Path of the Furon and its sequel for THQ, as well as Robocalypse for Vogster. Wright is a member of the Writers Guild of America West, where he is the chair of the Video Game Writers Caucus. In 2007, Wright and Lender were cited as being "instrumental" in creating the WGA's first ever Video Game Writing Award as part of the traditional film and television Writers Guild Awards. In 2011, the Video Game Writing Award attracted criticism from various video game websites for being too exclusive, prompting Wright to address the issue online.

In addition to his work at WGA's Video Game Writers Caucus, Wright co-founded the Native American and World Indigenous Writers Committee and was elected to be a part of the Guild Negotiating Committee for 2014.

=== 2010s ===
In 2012, Wright returned to comics with the launch of a Kickstarter campaign for Duster, a graphic novel he co-created with Jay Lender. The story, initially developed as a film script, depicts the life of a recently widowed female cropduster pilot at the end of World War II and her battle against a group of Nazi soldiers who crash-landed near her farm in West Texas. The graphic novel was eventually published in 2015. That same year, Wright worked as a consultant on HTC Vive's virtual reality game TheBlu, which led to his interest in VR technology and eventually a position as a teacher of the virtual reality filmmaking course at the Los Angeles branch of Emerson College. In 2016, Wright and Lender made their directorial debut with the feature film They're Watching, a found footage horror comedy distributed by Amplify.

Between 2017 and 2019, Wright served as the Chief Content Manager of the Native American broadcast television network First Nations Experience, overseeing the creation of first original programming in the network's history.

== Personal life ==
Wright is an enrolled member of the Muscogee Creek Nation.

== Filmography ==
=== Television ===
- The Angry Beavers (script supervisor, 1997–1999; writer, 1999–2001)
- Constant Payne (creator/writer/director/executive producer, unreleased pilot)
- Ozzy and Drix (writer, 2002)
- Aboriginal Unity Experience (executive producer, 2017–2018)
- KVCarts (executive producer, 2017–2018)
- Native Shorts (executive producer, 2017–2019)
- Smoke Signals (writer/executive producer, 2017–2019)
- First Nations Comedy Experience (executive producer, 2018)
- Studio 49 (executive producer, 2018–2019)
- Wassaja (executive producer, 2018)
- Future Proof (executive producer, 2018)
- California Pow-Wow (writer/executive producer, 2018–2019)
- The Huunam of Paakuma (executive producer, 2018)
- Native Vote 2018 (executive producer, 2018)
- Live from 3rd and Grand (executive producer, 2019)
- Sherlock & Daughter (writer, 2025)

=== Film ===
- Wonderful Days (uncredited; co-writer with Jay Lender, 2003)
- They're Watching (co-writer and co-director with Jay Lender, 2016)

== Bibliography ==
=== Comics ===
- DC Comics:
  - Stormwatch (Wildstorm):
    - Stormwatch: Team Achilles #1–23 (with Whilce Portacio, Mark Texeira (#7), Tomm Coker (#8), C. P. Smith, Clément Sauvé (#21–22) and Carlos D'Anda (#22–23), Eye of the Storm, 2002–2004)
      - The series was set for cancellation with issue #24 which was solicited for July 2004 but ended up being unpublished due to the controversy surrounding Wright's claims of military service.
      - Wright has posted the full scripts for the entire series, including the unpublished Stormwatch: Team Achilles #24, online.
      - The series, along with the related short stories originally released in various other publications, has been partially collected in two volumes:
        - Stormwatch: Team Achilles Volume 1 (collects #1–6 and the 8-page preview from Wizard #129, tpb, 160 pages, 2003, ISBN 1-4012-0103-2)
        - Stormwatch: Team Achilles Volume 2 (collects #7–11, tpb, 128 pages, 2003, ISBN 1-4012-0123-7)
          - Includes the "40 Winks" short story (art by Tomm Coker) from Eye of the Storm Annual (2003)
      - Another volume was solicited for a 2004 release but subsequently cancelled: Stormwatch: Team Achilles Volume 3 (tpb, 192 pages, ISBN 1-4012-0289-6)
    - Coup d'Etat #2: "Of, by and for the People" (with Carlos D'Anda, Eye of the Storm, 2004) collected in Coup d'Etat (tpb, 112 pages, 2004, ISBN 1-4012-0570-4)
  - Eye of the Storm Annual: "Delivery" (with Carlos D'Anda, co-feature, Wildstorm, 2003)
  - Vigilante vol. 2 (with Carlos D'Anda, unreleased 6-issue limited series — initially announced for 2004)
- Duster (co-written by Wright and Jay Lender, art by Diego Coglitore and Cristian Mallea, graphic novel self-published as Evil Scum, 264 pages, 2015, ISBN 1-9427-4982-1)
  - In addition to the print release, the book was also published as a digital 6-issue limited series (via Comixology) and serialized in the form of a webcomic.
- Get Lucky (co-written by Wright and Jay Lender, art by Diego Coglitore, 29-page webcomic, 2015–2016)

=== Poster books ===
- You Back the Attack, We'll Bomb Who We Want (96 pages, Seven Stories Press, 2003, ISBN 1-58322-584-6)
- If You're Not a Terrorist... Then Stop Asking Questions (48 pages, self-published via Xlibris, 2005, ISBN 1-4134-9276-2)
- Surveillance Means Security (128 pages, Seven Stories Press, 2006, ISBN 1-58322-741-5)

== Work in video games ==
- Looney Tunes: Back in Action (2003), Electronic Arts
- Shadow Ops: Red Mercury (2004), Atari
- The Dukes of Hazzard: Return of the General Lee (2004), Ubisoft
- Charlie and the Chocolate Factory (2005), 2K Games
- Friends: The One with All the Trivia (2005), Warner Bros. Interactive Entertainment
- The Sopranos: Road to Respect (2006), THQ
- HUXLEY (2008), Webzen
- Destroy All Humans! Big Willy Unleashed (2008), THQ
- Robocalypse (2008), Vogster
- Destroy All Humans! Path of the Furon (2008), THQ
- Night at the Museum: Battle of the Smithsonian (2009), Majesco
- Big League Sports Summer (2009), Activision
- Transformers: Revenge of the Fallen (2009), Activision
- Rolando 2: Quest for the Golden Orchid (2009), Ngmoco
- League of Legends (2009), Riot Games
- Robocalypse: Mobile Destruction (2009), Vogster
- Robocalypse: Beaver Defense (2010), Vogster
- Raving Rabbids: Travel in Time (2010), Ubisoft
- PlayStation Move Heroes (2011), SCEA/Nihilistic Software
- Skullgirls (2012), Reverge Labs
- Call of Duty: Black Ops II (2012), Activision
- TheBlu (2016), WeVR

Preceded by Warren Ellis (Stormwatch vol. 2)	Stormwatch writer 2002–2004	Succeeded by Christos Gage (Stormwatch PHD)
