= Coup d'etat (comics) =

2004 comic book crossover storyline

"Coup d'Etat"
- Cover of Coup d'Etat 2004, trade paperback collected edition, art by Jim Lee
- Publisher: Wildstorm Comics
- Publication date: April – May 2004
- Genre: Superhero; Crossover
Title(s)
The Authority: Coup D'Etat
Coup D'etat: Sleeper
Coup D'etat: StormWatch: Team Achilles
Coup D'Etat: Wildcats Version 3.0
Coup D'etat Afterword

Creative team
- Writer(s): (The Authority); Robbie Morrison (Sleeper); Ed Brubaker (Stormwatch); Micah Wright (Wildcats); Joe Casey
- Artist(s): (Sleeper); Jim Lee (Stormwatch); Carlos D'Anda
- Penciller(s): (The Authority); Whilce Portacio (Wildcats); Alé Garza
- Inker(s): (Wildcats & The Authority); Trevor Scott
- Coup d'Etat: ISBN 1-4012-0570-4

"Coup d'Etat" was a 2004 comic book crossover storyline published by American imprint WildStorm Comics.

== Publication history ==
The story ran across 4 issues, each featuring one of the major titles in the Wildstorm Universe at that time: Sleeper, Stormwatch: Team Achilles, Wildcats 3.0 and The Authority. Each issue of the overarching storyline, which Jim Lee described as a "stand alone 4 part mini-series event", is a one-shot focusing on one of the four different groups and created by their respective writers and artists.

There was also an "Afterword" issue including a preview to the second volume of Sleeper and a preview to the second volume of Wetworks, which was launched in mid-2006 by creator Whilce Portacio and writer Mike Carey.

== Plot ==
In Coup d'Etat, Tao places a device in the hands of the U.S. Government that allows them to enter the Bleed, where it exploded, damaging a vessel of an alien race and starting an interdimensional war. The crossover had important consequences for the Wildstorm Universe with the Authority taking control over the U.S. Government and Stormwatch: Team Achilles being forced underground.

For Stormwatch: Team Achilles and Wildcats 3.0, most of these consequences could not be explored as both series were cancelled shortly afterwards. The Authority taking control of the U.S. Government led into the events of The Authority: Revolution.

== Reception ==
Both the "Sleeper" and "Afterword" issues sold out, despite what DC described as "generous overprints".

== Collected editions ==
The story was collected into a trade paperback:

- Coup d'Etat (collects "Sleeper", "Stormwatch: Team Achilles", "Wildcats 3.0" and "The Authority" in that order, 112 pages, November 2004, ISBN 1-4012-0570-4)

== See also ==
- List of Wildstorm titles
- Wildstorm: Armageddon, another Wildstorm series where each issue was from a different Wildstorm title
