= Looney Tunes: Back in Action (video game) =

2003 video game

- North American GameCube box art
- Developer: Warthog Games
- Publishers: Electronic Arts; Warner Bros. Interactive Entertainment
- Producers: Lee Clare; Tim Coupe
- Designer: Travis Ryan
- Programmer: Kevin Ng
- Artist: John Clarke
- Writers: Jay Lender; Micah Wright; Travis Ryan
- Platforms: PlayStation 2, Game Boy Advance, GameCube
- Release: Game Boy Advance: NA: November 11, 2003; PAL: January 30, 2004; PlayStation 2: NA: November 19, 2003; PAL: January 30, 2004; GameCube: NA: November 24, 2003; PAL: January 30, 2004
- Genre: Platform
- Mode: Single-player

Looney Tunes: Back in Action is a platform game developed by Warthog Games and co-published by Electronic Arts and Warner Bros. Interactive Entertainment in 2003 for PlayStation 2, GameCube, and Game Boy Advance. It is based on the movie of the same name by Joe Dante. An Xbox version was also announced, which never released.

== Plot ==
The game shares its plot with that of the movie. When a mystical gem called "The Blue Monkey Diamond" is stolen from Daffy Duck by the Acme Corporation, the Looney Tunes must set off on an adventure to get it back.

== Gameplay ==
Las Vegas world (GameCube)

Gameplay involves playing as Bugs Bunny or Daffy Duck. Each character has their own unique special abilities and the game requires using both characters. Along the way, money is found all over the place, usually as coins and bills. Gold bars are also found but rarely. Coins are worth $5, bills are worth $50, and gold is worth $100. Some items are buried in the ground. The money is used to access any of 4 other regions in the game such as Vegas or Paris. Each character can take 3 hits. Upon the third hit, they return to the last checkpoint. There is an unlimited number of lives. Bugs Bunny has the special abilities of digging and double-jumping. Daffy Duck has the special abilities of fluttering and swimming. Bugs and Daffy must accomplish four to six challenges within each of five regions. The PlayStation 2 version includes bonus features such as the making of the game.

== Development ==
The game was announced in January 2003, when Warner Bros. Interactive Entertainment and Electronic Arts (through their EA Distribution subsidiary) announced a co-publishing deal for the game. It was the first video game directly published by Warner Bros. Interactive Entertainment themselves.

== Reception ==
Reception

Aggregate scores
Aggregator	Score
GameRankings	(GC) 67.63% (PS2) 58.77% (GBA) 49.38%
Metacritic	(GC) 64/100 (PS2) 51/100 (GBA) 47/100

Review scores
Publication	Score
Computer and Video Games	7.1/10
Game Informer	5/10
GameSpy	2/5
GameZone	(PS2) 7.8/10 (GBA) 6/10
IGN	4.5/10
NGC Magazine	56%
Nintendo Power	(GC) 3/5 (GBA) 2.2/5
Official U.S. PlayStation Magazine	1/5
X-Play	2/5

The game was met with mixed reviews upon release, except for the Game Boy Advance version, which received unfavorable reviews. GameRankings and Metacritic gave it respective scores of 49.38% and 47 out of 100 for the Game Boy Advance version;

58.77% and 51 out of 100 for the PlayStation 2 version; and 67.63% and 64 out of 100 for the GameCube version. Reviewing the PS2 version for X-Play, Skyler Miller gave the game a 2 out of 5, criticising the graphics, calling them "mediocre at best". They additionally thought the camera was difficult to use and concluded that "In the end, 'Looney Tunes: Back in Action' feels like a generic platformer with Looney Tunes characters pasted on top of it. All of the irreverent one-liners in the world can't save it, and neither can half-hearted appearances by supporting characters."
