= Robocalypse: Beaver Defense =

2010 video game

- Developer: Vogster Entertainment
- Publisher: Vogster Entertainment
- Platform: WiiWare
- Release: NA: May 31, 2010; EU: June 4, 2010
- Genre: Tower defense
- Modes: Single-player, Multiplayer

Robocalypse: Beaver Defense is a tower defense video game developed by Ukrainian studio Vogster Entertainment for WiiWare, and a follow-up to their Nintendo DS game Robocalypse. It was released in North America on May 31, 2010 and in Europe on June 4, 2010.

== Game play ==
The game revolves around a vengeful mutated beaver called 'the Brain Beaver' whose only goal is to get his revenge, with the player on the other end of it. The game play is like any other tower defense game, the player placing defenses around their headquarters in order fight of enemy robots. Where this game differs from other tower defense games is the players ability to control a Hero Robot and have a direct effect on the overall game.

== Development ==
The plot was created by Jay Lender and Micah Wright, former writers for SpongeBob SquarePants who were also involved in the development of the previous game. The game was originally slated to support online play for up to four players, but this was later scrapped for the final release.

Unlike its predecessor, the sequel would be rated Teen by the ESRB solely due to the suggestive appearance of a female character, Constance Menzies, who resembles Flaxen Hayer in the first game.

== Reception ==
IGN rated the game a 7.0 and felt it wasn't as strong as the original release on the DS. However, they still felt that fans of tower defense games would enjoy it. Wiiloveit.com gave it a 22/30, and thought it was an "adequate tower defense game" sold for a "great bargain".
