= Rachel Rhodes =

Rachel Rhodes is the name of:

- Mother-one (Rachel L. Rhodes), fictional character in Wildstorm Productions' Wetworks comics
- Rei Yasuda (born Rachel Rhodes; 1993), Japanese singer
