= Under One Roof (2008 TV series) =

- Genre: Comedy
- Starring: Flavor Flav; Kelly Perine; Carrie Genzel; Marie Michel; Jesse Reid; Emily Kuroda
- Theme music composer: Flavor Flav
- Countries of origin: United States; Canada
- Original language: English
- No. of seasons: 1
- No. of episodes: 13

Production
- Executive producers: Claude Brooks, Gelila Asres, Darryl Quarles, Stanton W. Kamens, Kirk Shaw
- Production locations: Maple Ridge, British Columbia
- Running time: 30 minutes
- Production companies: Qtopia Entertainment; Insight Film Studios; Ambitious Entertainment; C To The B Productions; Reel One Entertainment

Original release
- Network: MyNetworkTV
- Release: April 16, 2008 – January 14, 2009

Under One Roof is a sitcom starring musician and Flavor of Love star Flavor Flav and comic actor Kelly Perine best known for his work on One on One. The series is written by Danielle Quarles. It premiered on MyNetworkTV on April 16, 2008, at 8:00PM Eastern/7:00PM Central.

Under One Roof was one of the last first-run primetime shows to air on MyNetworkTV before the network's change to a syndicated programming service.

== Plot ==
Calvester (Flavor Flav) and Winston Hill (Kelly Perine) act like they are from opposite sides of the track when they actually just grew up on opposite sides of the room. Years later, Winston is a successful and wealthy real estate developer with a perfect and privileged family, but his life gets interrupted when his street smart, older brother Calvester finally gets out of prison and moves into the mansion since his brother owes him a favor due to an incident where Calvester took the blame for his brother's car crash.

It's not long before Calvester begins parading his old prison cronies through the house driving the Hill family crazy - butting heads with Winston's trophy wife Ashley (Carrie Genzel); 17-year-old daughter, Heather (Marie Michel); and housekeeper Su Ho (Emily Kuroda). Calvester even teaches Winston's 16-year-old son, Winston Jr. (Jesse Reid) to be a gangster rapper.

== Cast ==
- Flavor Flav as Calvester "Cali Cal" Hill
- Kelly Perine as Winston Hill
- Carrie Genzel as Ashley Hill
- Marie Michel as Heather Hill
- Jesse Reid as Winston Hill Jr.
- Emily Kuroda as Su Ho

== Episodes ==
No.	Title	Original release date
1	"Release Therapy"	April 16, 2008
Calvester is forced to rethink his view on life when he gets a visit from a former cellmate, Punkin (Tiny Lister). Unable to get Punkin to leave their house, and in fear of their lives, the Hills feel like prisoners in their own home. When Calvester discovers this Punkin has romantic designs on him, he enlists the help of the family to get Punkin out of their lives forever.
2	"Cell Out"	April 23, 2008
Calvester's former cellmate, Jamal (Kadeem Hardison), comes to visit and immediately impresses Winston and the family with his knowledge of the stock market. Everyone falls for him, including Heather, who develops a crush, but Calvester isn't sure of his motives. Will the family believe Calvester, or will they find themselves too "taken" with Jamal?
3	"Cop Out"	April 30, 2008
Calvester’s childhood bully is now his new parole officer and plans on making his life a living hell. But when he moves into the Hill house and makes them wait on him hand and foot, the family must call in a secret weapon.
4	"Thug Jr."	May 7, 2008
In an effort to get rich quick, Winston Jr. decides to become a gangsta rapper. But his "transition" wreaks havoc on the family. Can a battle with a hard-hitting gangster rapper send him back to his conservative ways?
5	"Oh Brother!"	May 14, 2008
On this Under One Roof, Dallas Cowboys' Terrell Owens is in the house! With the family’s spending outpacing their earnings, Winston invests in a website run by his supposed brother Sean, who shows up one day out of the blue. But is Sean really a long-lost relative or a big time con man? Whatever the play, Calvester ain't buying it!
6	"The Blacker the Berry"	May 21, 2008
The Hills have new neighbors, Brenda and her daughter Jamilia, and Cali Cal is turning on the charm. But when Brenda puts Heather in touch with her "sista" side, Mrs. Hill has to go "black" to get her daughter back!
7	"Say Cheese"	May 28, 2008
Calvester gets a new job as an assistant to a famous photographer. But when his new boss plans to publish revealing photos of a young Ashley, Cali Cal must come to the rescue and keep the family jewels from being exposed.
8	"Ashley's Mom"	June 4, 2008
When Ashley's wealthy mom, Maggie, comes to visit, the tension in the Hill household begins to mount. But when she falls for Calvester's charms, Winston and Ashley try to speed up the wedding to get Calvester out of their home. Could this be the end of Calvester's "playa" status, or will Maggie's snobbery clash with his thug life?
9	"Moose Crossing"	June 11, 2008
An old college buddy visits Winston when he comes to town. But Winston's acceptance is put to the test when he discovers his football-playing friend Moose made a big decision, changing genders. Will things change between him and his old friend?
10	"Handiman"	June 18, 2008
Calvester finds he has to maintain full-time employment or go back to jail. But when he fakes a disability to get a job at a lingerie store, Cali Cal's got to work overtime to keep up the charade.
11	"Get Rich...or Fry Tryin"	July 2, 2008
Winston's big real-estate deal falls through, and in a panic, hesteals Calvester's phone for all its rap mogul contacts. But all comes to a head when Twista the rapper shows up to claim his cell phone from Winston.
12	"Baby Beef"	January 7, 2009
Ashley tells Winston she wants to have another baby.
13	"Going, Going, Gone"	January 14, 2009
Cali Cal moves in with a friend after Winston kicks him out before asking him back.

== Ratings ==
#	Episode	18–49	25–54	Viewers (millions)
1	"Release Therapy"	0.5/2	0.5/2	1.21
2	"Cell Out"	0.5/2	0.5/2	1.27
3	"Cop Out"	0.5/2	0.5/2	1.19
4	"Thug Jr."	0.4/1	0.4/1	0.90
5	"Oh Brother"	0.5/1	0.5/1	0.99
6	"The Blacker the Berry"	0.4/1	0.4/1	1.04
7	"Say Cheese"	0.4/1	0.5/1	1.09
8	"Ashley's Mom"	0.4/1	0.5/1	0.90
9	"Moose Crossing"	0.5/2	0.6/2	1.20
10	"Handiman"	0.5/2	0.5/2	1.19
11	"Get Rich...or Fry Tryin"	0.4/1	0.4/1	0.92
12	"Baby Beef"	0.3/1	N/A	0.74
13	"Going, Going, Gone"	0.2/0	N/A	0.53
