= G.I. Joe: Renegades =

American animated television series

- Genre: Military science fiction
- Based on: G.I. Joe: A Real American Hero by Hasbro
- Developed by: Henry Gilroy; Marty Isenberg; Jeff Kline
- Voices of: Charlie Adler; Clancy Brown; Natalia Cigliuti; Nika Futterman; Matthew Yang King; Jason Marsden; Johnny Messner; Khary Payton; Kevin Michael Richardson; Charlie Schlatter; Tatyana Yassukovich
- Narrated by: David Kaye
- Opening theme: Starr Parodi; Jeff Eden Fair
- Composers: Starr Parodi; Jeff Eden Fair
- Country of origin: United States
- No. of seasons: 1
- No. of episodes: 26

Production
- Executive producers: Jeff Kline; Stephen Davis
- Running time: 21–22 minutes
- Production companies: Darby Pop Productions; Hasbro Studios

Original release
- Network: The Hub
- Release: November 26, 2010 – July 23, 2011

G.I. Joe: Renegades is an American animated television series based on the G.I. Joe toy franchise. The series aired on The Hub from November 26, 2010, to July 23, 2011.

The series was previously available to stream on Netflix from April 5, 2012, to February 2015, as streaming rights to the show, along with other Hasbro Studios shows were transferred to advertiser-supported video-on-demand service Tubi TV, which launched in April 2014 and it is currently available for streaming online on Amazon Prime Video, Plex, The Roku Channel, Tubi and YouTube (via the G.I. Joe channel). DVD and Blu-ray releases by Shout! Factory came out in 2013.

== Plot ==
A small group of US military personnel are forced to become fugitives, after uncovering suspicious activity at a Cobra Industries pharmaceutical facility. Now branded as renegades by the media for terrorist crimes that they did not commit and pursued by the military as well as Cobra mercenaries, they must use their specialized military skills to prove their innocence and to expose the true face of Cobra Industries and its mysterious leader, Adam DeCobray.

(According to the recent "Hub Exclusive" TV broadcast promoting this series and Transformers: Prime, homages to The A-Team are used in the background of this incarnation of the characters. Most notable is that Roadblock is stated to parallel B.A. Baracus in size and mechanical aptitude, and Flint is a Lieutenant, rather than a warrant officer and is specifically the officer assigned to arrest the "Renegades", akin to Colonel Lynch of the A-Team series. Also, Lady Jaye is sympathetic to her longtime friend Duke and provides covert support for him and the Renegades, much like Captain Charissa Sosa in the A-Team film and Amy Allen in the 1980s TV series.)

== Opening narration ==
After two episodes, the series' intro is narrated by David Kaye:

Accused of a crime they didn't commit, a ragtag band of fugitives fights a covert battle to clear their names and expose the insidious enemy that is... Cobra. Some call them outlaws. Some call them heroes. But these determined men and women think of themselves only as "Ordinary Joes". And this is their story.

== Cast ==
- Charlie Adler as Cobra Commander, Buzzer, Monkeywrench, Jumpmaster (ep. 1) Cobra Trooper #1 (ep. 1), Swami Vipra (ep. 13), Guard #2 (ep. 20)
- Clancy Brown as Destro, Truman (ep. 8), Whistleblower (ep. 11)
- Natalia Cigliuti as Scarlett
- Nika Futterman as Lady Jaye, Female Reporter (ep. 1, 7), Sheriff's Clerk (ep. 10)
- David Kaye as Main Title Narrator, Professor Patrick O'Hara (ep. 25–26)
- Matthew Yang King as Tunnel Rat, Torch, Cobra Trooper #3 (ep. 1), Country Clerk (ep. 10), Technician (ep. 10), Cobra Guard #1 (ep. 16), Pilot (ep. 19), Operations Tech (ep. 24), Cobra Guard (ep. 26)
- Jason Marsden as Duke, Ripper, Trooper #2 (ep. 1), Mitchell (ep. 2), Prison Guard #1 (ep. 10), Intel (ep. 10)
- Johnny Messner as Flint
- Khary Payton as Ripcord, Lead Cobra Trooper (ep. 1), Guard #1 (ep. 20)
- Kevin Michael Richardson as Roadblock, Road Pig, Computer Voice, Major Hidalgo (ep. 1), Cobra Security Trooper (ep. 1), Mechanic (ep. 10), News Anchor (ep. 11), Crowd Member #1 (ep. 12), Franz (ep. 13), Guard #1 (ep. 13), Moon (ep. 16), Sailor (ep. 16), Preacher Davis (ep. 23)
- Charlie Schlatter as Doctor Mindbender, Wild Bill, Lift-Ticket, Security Chief (ep. 1)
- Tatyana Yassukovich as Baroness, Receptionist (ep. 1)

=== Additional voices ===
- Carlos Alazraqui as Shipwreck, Cobra Guard #2 (ep. 16), Captain (ep. 16)
- Sterling Ardrey as Reggie (ep. 21)
- Troy Baker as Airtight
- Michael Bell as Max Hauser (ep. 6), Cobra Guard (ep. 6), Delivery Man (ep. 6)
- Brian Bloom as Zartan
- Corey Burton as Law, Granger (ep. 10), Crippled Convict (ep. 10)
- Danny Cooksey as Snake Eyes
- Ja'net Dubois as Grandma Hilton (ep. 23)
- Greg Ellis as Breaker, Cobra Ops Supervisor (ep. 3), Dr. Sharma (ep. 11)
- Michael Emerson as Doctor Venom
- Keith Ferguson as Heavy Duty
- Kim Mai Guest as Jinx
- Jennifer Hale as Wendy (ep. 9)
- Daniel Dae Kim as Teddy Lee (ep. 21)
- Andrew Kishino as Storm Shadow, Stalker, Private Tormod Skoog, Frostbite, Custodian (ep. 22), Lead Cobra Trooper (ep. 22)
- Phil LaMarr as Scrap-Iron, Doc
- Peter MacNicol as Firefly
- Lee Majors as General Abernathy
- Eddie Mata as Steeler
- Danica McKellar as Sister Leia (ep. 13), Woman (ep. 13)
- Scott Menville as Vince Hauser (ep. 6)
- Jim Meskimen as Norton (ep. 2), News Reporter (ep. 2), SWAT MP (ep. 2)
- Nolan North as Snow Job
- Liam O'Brien as Red Star, German CEO (ep. 18)
- Jerry O'Connell as Barbecue
- Alejandra Reynoso as Elena Schnurr (ep. 19)
- André Sogliuzzo as Major Bludd, Store Manager (ep. 3)
- Stephen Stanton as Tomax and Xamot
- Keith Szarabajka as Warden (ep. 10), Convict (ep. 10), P.A. Voice (ep. 10)
- James Arnold Taylor as Sheriff Terry (ep. 9)
- Jessie Usher as Ray (ep. 21)
- B.J. Ward as Connie Hauser (ep. 6)
- Fred Willard as Mayor Lockridge (ep. 12)
- Travis Willingham as Sully (ep. 10), Prison Gate Guard (ep. 10), Cop #1 (ep. 10)
- Keone Young as Hard Master (ep. 4, 5), Arata (ep. 4)

== Crew ==
- Trisha Burgio - Background Designer
- Whitney Champion - Creator
- Phil S. Crain - Line Producer
- Henry Gilroy - Story Editor, Developer
- Marty Isenberg - Story Editor, Developer
- Jeff Kline - Executive Producer, Developer
- Ginny McSwain - Casting Director and Voice Director
- Matt Meeks - Creator
- Randy Myers - Supervising Director
- Clément Sauvé - Character Design (2010–2011)
- Therese Trujillo - Supervising Animation Producer, Consulting Producer

== Episodes ==
No.	Title	Directed by	Written by	Original release date
1	"The Descent, Part 1"	Nathan Chew	Henry Gilroy & Marty Isenberg	November 26, 2010
A team of five soldiers—Duke, Ripcord, Tunnel Rat, Roadblock and Scarlett (with Snake Eyes helping from the shadows)—are sent to investigate Cobra Pharmaceuticals. They discover Cobra's new top secret weapon, Bio-Vipers, but are discovered and are forced to blow the facility to save themselves; though seemingly at the cost of Ripcord's life. Introducing Characters: Duke, Tunnel Rat, Scarlett, Roadblock, Snake Eyes, Rip Cord, General Abernathy, Baroness, Doctor Mindbender, Lady Jaye, Cobra Commander
2	"The Descent, Part 2"	Scott Bern	Henry Gilroy & Marty Isenberg	November 26, 2010
After surviving the Cobra Pharmaceuticals explosion, the team are framed for it and become known as the "Renegades" by the media. They then go after a surviving Bio-Viper that's heading to Springfield. While Baroness and Doctor Mindbender oversee the "quarantine," General Abernathy sends Flint to get Lady Jaye to help him bring in Duke's team. Introducing Characters: Flint
3	"Rage"	Kevin Altieri	Stan Berkowitz	January 7, 2011
Posing as a preacher that helps veterans, Scrap-Iron kidnaps Tunnel Rat and uses him to test a weaponized "exo-armor" suit for James McCullen and M.A.R.S. Industries. He meets Ralph Pulaski (a.k.a. Steeler) in another suit and they must battle each other to survive. Roadblock then attempts a rescue by allowing himself to be captured, but he is forced into an exo-suit as well. Now the rest of the Joes have to save him too. Introducing Characters: Scrap-Iron, Steeler, Destro (As James McCullen), Doc, (Iron Grenadiers are mentioned)
4	"Dreadnoks Rising"	Scooter Tidwell	Eugene Son	January 14, 2011
The Joes make a pit stop in a small town in Kansas and quickly find themselves tangling with the Dreadnoks, their leader Zartan, and a cowardly local sheriff. Now they must race against time to help the locals free themselves from the biker gang's reign of terror, give the sheriff his courage back, put the whole gang behind bars, and get out of dodge before Flint arrives to arrest them. Introducing Characters: Zartan, The Dreadnoks (Buzzer, Ripper, Torch, Monkeywrench and Road Pig)
5	"The Package"	Nathan Chew	Rich Fogel	December 3, 2010
The Baroness contacts mercenary, Major Bludd, to track down and assassinate a target—-a former Cobra employee turned internet blogger-—who they believed stole one of their data scanners, only to learn he's under the Joes' protection. Introducing Characters: Major Bludd, Breaker
6	"Return of the Arashikage, Part 1"	Scott Bern	Greg Johnson	December 10, 2010
The Joes take refuge at Snake Eyes' dojo where they train with him and meet his first apprentice, Jinx. They also learn about his connection to Jinx's cousin Storm Shadow and their connected past to the Arashikage ninja clan led by the Hard Master. Introducing Characters: Jinx, Storm Shadow, Hard Master
7	"Return of the Arashikage, Part 2"	Kevin Altieri	Dean Stefan	December 17, 2010
The Joes regroup after an ambush from Storm Shadow, who has kidnapped Jinx, and make a plan to hunt down the former and rescue the latter.
8	"Busted"	Scooter Tidwell	Andrew R. Robinson	January 28, 2011
Duke is wrongfully imprisoned when he gets caught up in a chop shop while looking for a replacement part for their vehicle. The rest of G.I. Joe must break him out of prison by having Roadblock get arrested. They soon discover that the prison warden is making prisoners fight each other for his amusement. Now the Joes must get Duke and Roadblock out and expose the illegal activities in the prison. Introducing Characters: Law & Order
9	"The Enemy of My Enemy"	Nathan Chew	Scott Sonneborn	February 4, 2011
Adam DeCobray, head of Cobra Industries, hires James McCullen of M.A.R.S. Industries to combine Dr. Mindbender's Bio-Vipers with the failed MARS exo-armor suits. Meanwhile, the Joes infiltrate the Cobra lab after receiving information of DeCobray's plans, from a masked whistleblower. During the attempt, Mindbender reveals a deadly secret, leading DeCobray to reveal himself as Cobra Commander. James McCullen becomes an iron-masked "Destro" (estranged/alienated one) as a symbol of his failure, betrayal and servitude to Cobra. Introducing Characters: Serpentor the Cobra, Iron Grenadiers, Mecha-Vipers
10	"Fire Fight"	Scott Bern	Alexx Van Dyne	February 11, 2011
When the town of Green Ridge issues a court order to Cobra Industries to halt the construction of their dam, Baroness and Doctor Mindbender send Firefly to burn this former resort town to the ground, leaving it up to G.I. Joe and a local firefighter to stop him. Introducing Characters: Firefly, Barbecue
11	"Homecoming, Part 1"	Kevin Altieri	Marty Isenberg	December 24, 2010
Duke heads home to Missouri to protect his family from Cobra, while the Joes infiltrate Cobra Industrie's Christmas party in Washington D.C. Duke's (adolescent) past with Flint during a high school state football championship is revealed. Introducing Characters: Max Hauser (Duke's dad), Connie Hauser (Duke's mom), Vincent Hauser (Duke's younger brother)
12	"Homecoming, Part 2"	Scooter Tidwell	Greg Johnson	December 24, 2010
With the Joes in Flint's military custody en route to DC aboard a military train, the Baroness tries to regain a hard drive holding Cobra secrets. Now dubbed the "Springfield Four", the Joes' identities are compromised in the process. Storm Shadow via the Baroness, forms an alliance with Cobra. Introducing Characters: Stalker, Tripwire
13	"Brothers of Light"	Nathan Chew	Brandon Auman	March 11, 2011
Running a cult commune and fleecing the initiatives of their money, psychic twins Tomax and Xamot hypnotize most of the Joes after they find Sister Leia wandering in the desert. Meanwhile, Doctor Mindbender is seeking a psychic in order to learn the secrets to mind control for his Bio-Vipers. Introducing Characters: Tomax and Xamot, Crimson Guard Trivia: This episode was dedicated to the memory of Clément Sauvé (1977–2011).
14	"Knockoffs"	Scott Bern	Tom Pugsley	March 18, 2011
Flint and Lady Jaye offer Zartan a reduced sentence for his help. Meanwhile, the Baroness transports a camouflage suit—-technology that can duplicate anyone's appearance—-to Cobra Commander, but Zartan accidentally ruins everyone's plans as the Falcons call in the assistance of Wild Bill Hardy. The Joes and the Falcons must capture Zartan and retrieve the camo suit. Introducing Characters: warrant officer/helicopter pilot Wild Bill Hardy
15	"White Out"	Kevin Altieri	Dean Stefan	March 25, 2011
Doctor Mindbender creates prototype "Shadow-Vipers", synthetic doppelgangers of Storm Shadow, to track down the Joes, who are now in Canada hiding out with Snow Job, Tunnel Rat's old arctic trooper buddy. But Snow Job doesn't give the team the warm welcome they expect. There, Snake Eyes rescues a timber wolf caught in a hunter's trap. Introducing Characters: Snow Job, Frostbite, Timber
16	"Shipwrecked"	Scooter Tidwell	Stan Berkowitz	April 16, 2011
A sea captain named Hector Delgado helps the Joes transport a canister commandeered from Cobra's arctic lab to General Abernathy in Washington D.C., evidence that would expose Cobra Industries' illegal activities and clear their names. On board his ship, Courtney, a prototype Techno-Viper is freed from its canister. Introducing Characters: Shipwreck, Cover Girl (in a poster as Courtney Kreiger), USS Flagg, Techno-Viper Trivia: The two Cobra grunts at the beginning, revealed when they compare stories, are grunts from Fire Fight and Homecoming who are being punished for losing to the Joes.
17	"Castle Destro"	Nathan Chew	Mitch Rothenberg & Josh Eiserike	April 23, 2011
Tracing the prototype Techno-Viper's signal, following its defeat, the Joes end up in Scotland, and become trapped inside Destro’s castle during a recon mission. They discover the Bio-Dag, a missile that dispenses Bio-Vipers en-masse. Introducing Characters: B.A.T.s
18	"Union of the Snake"	Scott Bern	Eugene Son	April 30, 2011
The Joes infiltrate a corporate tele-communications summit at the Cisarovna chateau in Russia. They uncover a mind-control scheme involving Cobra Industries' new "Black Adder" cellphone. However, the Joes discover a local with an axe to grind against the Baroness and her family, and he's willing to sacrifice everyone's life for revenge. Introducing Characters: Red Star (of the Oktober Guard) Trivia: Cobra Flight Pods (aka: "Trouble Bubbles") from the old series were introduced.
19	"The Anaconda Strain"	Kevin Altieri	Bill Wolkoff	May 7, 2011
The Joes uncover the deadly Anaconda Strain (a mammalian virus engineered from reptile DNA) while searching for a missing biochemist Dr. Kurt Schnurr in Mexico. They also learn of Cobra's plan to profit from the sale of its antidote once they've released it onto the unsuspecting populace. Introducing Characters: Airtight, Dr. Monev
20	"Prodigal"	Scooter Tidwell	Andrew R. Robinson	May 14, 2011
The Joes raid a Cobra medical facility to search for "Patient X" (the originator of the Anaconda Strain) and any other information that would help them prevent an outbreak. They soon discover that Patient X is actually an amnesiac Rip Cord and help to regain his memory. Unbeknownst to them, he has been turned into a Bio-Viper/human hybrid by Doctor Mindbender and Cobra can track his movements. The Joes also must work to get Ripcord under control as the Falcons who have enlisted Lift-Ticket are on his trail. Introducing Characters: Lift-Ticket
21	"The Anomaly"	Nathan Chew	Ed Lee & Tim Jennings	June 11, 2011
Doctor Mindbender's attempt to create another human/Bio-Viper hybrid appears to be a failure at first until it ends up reassembling in the New York City sewer system. When Duke, Roadblock, and Ripcord go along with Tunnel Rat to his hometown of Brooklyn to find a missing child named Reggie, they encounter the Sewer Viper being pursued by Doctor Mindbender. When the mad scientist tries to reclaim Ripcord for Cobra, the Sewer Viper removes the control chip in his head, giving the Joe full control of his Bio-Viper form. Introducing Characters: Teddy Lee (Tunnel Rat's older brother)
22	"Cutting Edge"	Scott Bern	Greg Johnson	June 18, 2011
When Scarlett and Snake Eyes sneak into Cobra Tower, they find out that Cobra Commander is hiding in the facility after a ninja attack at his castle. The threat of the ninja assassin causes Baroness to call in Storm Shadow to protect Cobra Commander. It is soon discovered that the ninja is actually Jinx in a high-tech suit made by Destro's M.A.R.S. Industries. Jinx learns what really happened to the Hard Master, Storm Shadow confesses to accidentally poisoning his tea, leaving Jinx to be the rightful leader to the Arashikage clan, while he disappears. She swears the clan will go down the honorable path her father intended, abandon the old ways and embrace the new using technology.
23	"Cousins"	Kevin Altieri	Henry Gilroy	June 25, 2011
Flint hires Corporal Hershel Dalton to apprehend his estranged cousin Roadblock while he (and the team) is in his hometown of Biloxi, Mississippi for their grandfather's funeral. Major Bludd chases the cousins through the bijou with help from Baroness. Introducing Characters: Heavy Duty, Grandma Hinton (Roadblock and Heavy Duty's grandmother)
24	"Going Underground"	Scooter Tidwell	Eric Karten	July 9, 2011
While investigating a series of earthquakes that hit along the eastern seaboard in one week, the Joes discover tunnels under a Virginia barn being constructed by Cobra, though a massive drilling excavator ends up separating Duke and Scarlett from the others. Like the roads of Ancient Rome, they figure out Cobra is building an underground network with Maglev rails that will allow them to move anything, anywhere, at any time without the public's knowledge.
25	"Revelations, Part 1"	Nathan Chew	Greg Johnson	July 16, 2011
Scarlett and the Joes go to her hometown of Atlanta, Georgia where she visits her vacant family home. She learns from footage recovered by Snake Eyes that her father Patrick O'Hara invented the Molecular Assembler Scrambler Sender (a.k.a. the MASS Device) for Cobra Industries. Meanwhile, the Baroness commands the Bio-Vipers to attack the Joes when Cobra realizes the stone in Scarlett's locket is an integral part of the MASS device. Introducing Characters: Professor Patrick O'Hara (Scarlett's father) Trivia: Features the MASS Device from the original 1980s animated (5 part) mini-series.
26	"Revelations, Part 2"	Kevin Altieri & Patrick Archibald	Michael Ryan	July 23, 2011
As Scarlett's locket is in Baroness and Doctor Mindbender's possession, the Joes decide to take the fight to Cobra Industries by infiltrating their stronghold and stop them from finishing the MASS device. After a climactic fight, the Joes arrive in Washington D.C. in Destro's High Speed Sentry (a.k.a. HISS tank) and are surrounded by General Abernathy and the Falcons. Scarlett shows them the proof they need to clear their names. In the end, Cobra Industries' secrets are revealed and Cobra Commander survived and declares war on the Joes. Trivia #1: The original broadcast included a trailer segment showcasing the 1980s Sunbow cartoon version of Duke stating the Renegades reality was "just a dream", specifically separating the two interpretations. The other counterparts of the Renegades crew refute the Renegades reality, laughing at the description Real American Duke tells them. Trivia #2: The H.I.S.S. tank along with Destro's signature outfit are featured, and the Cobra Night Raven can be seen on a Cobra computer screen Trivia #3: Near the end of the episode, Duke receives a scar across his left eye that is similar to the one he had in G.I. Joe: Resolute and G.I. Joe: The Rise of Cobra.

== Production ==
G.I. Joe: Renegades finished its first season original broadcast with the episode "Revelations - Part 2" on July 23, 2011. The series went on hiatus status according to Hub PR department, with no news of renewal for a second season in July 2011. On January 26, 2012, when asked when viewers would see a second season, Henry Gilroy said, "Actually, you're probably not going to."

In January 2023, twelve years after the series went off the air, Henry Gilroy revealed that the show's cancellation was due to creative conflicts with Hasbro, including the planned second season's resemblance to the live-action G.I. Joe films, and Hasbro's desire to focus on the upcoming film G.I. Joe: Retaliation instead of continuing the animated series.

== Home video release ==
On June 5, 2012, Shout! Factory released "G.I. Joe: Renegades - Season 1, Volume 1" on DVD. "G.I. Joe: Renegades - Season 1, Volume 2" was released on DVD on September 25, 2012; the entire season was released on Blu-ray Disc at that time, as well.

== In other media ==
=== Comic books ===
As adaptations of episodes of the TV series, IDW Publishing published four comic books under the name of G.I. Joe: Renegades. The comic books were released out of order. Each comic book is 104 pages long.

- Volume 1 was released on January 10, 2012.
- Volume 2 and 3 were released on July 22, 2012.
- Volume 4 were released on August 9, 2012.

=== Toys ===
Action figures of Duke, Ripcord, Scarlett, Snake Eyes and Tunnel Rat were released in 2011, based on the characters from G.I. Joe: Renegades, with the additional action figures of Law & Order and Airtight. Renegades versions of Cobra Commander, Cobra Trooper, Firefly and Storm Shadow were also released as action figures in 2011. All action figures were branded as part of the 30th Anniversary line. Finally, the main G.I. Joe Renegades team was completed in 2017 with the release of Roadblock as part of the San Diego Comic Con-exclusive IDW Revolution box set.

== Reception ==
=== Ratings ===
The Transformers: Prime/G.I. Joe Renegades block of special programming on Friday from 3:30 p.m.–7 p.m. generated significant gains audience versus the previous week among households and key demographics: HH (+111%, 97,000), Persons 2+ (+133%, 142,000), Kids 2-11 (+130%, 62,000), Kids 6-11 (+78%, 32,000), Adults 18-49 (+117%, 50,000) and Women 18-49 (+120%, 11,000).
