= Human Defense Corps =

Fictional military organization

- Cover of Human Defense Corps #1 (July 2003), art by Clément Sauvé.

Group publication information
- Publisher: DC Comics
- First appearance: Human Defense Corps #1 (July 2003)
- Created by: Ty Templeton; Clément Sauvé

In-story information
- Type of organization: Military
- Base(s): United States Armed Forces
- Leader(s): Colonel Reno Rosetti
- Agent(s): Sergeant Montgomery Kelly; Sergeant Chad Kiyahani; Sergeant Dobbs; Corporal Taylor; Specialist Colin Mitchell; Private David Page; Private Eric Stewart

Human Defense Corps

Series publication information
- Format: Limited series
- Genre: Science fictionSuperhero
- Publication date: July – December 2003
- Number of issues: 6

Creative team
- Writer(s): Ty Templeton
- Penciller(s): Clément Sauvé; Norm Breyfogle (#6)
- Inker(s): Juan Vlasco (#1-3); Dennis Janke (#4-6)
- Letterer(s): John Morelli (#1-2); Clem Robins (#3-6)
- Colorist(s): Moose Baumann
- Creator(s): Ty Templeton; Clément Sauvé
- Editor(s): Valerie D'Orazio; Dan Raspler

The Human Defense Corps are a military organization appearing an American comic books published by DC Comics. They first appeared in Human Defense Corps #1 (July 2003), and were created by writer Ty Templeton and artist Clément Sauvé.

== Publication history ==
Human Defense Corps is a six-issue limited series published by DC Comics in 2003, written by Ty Templeton and drawn by Clément Sauvé.

The series did not sell well, and the concept disappeared until Superman and Justice League of America writer James Robinson began to feature the Corps in Superman vol. 3, starting with a passing mention of the events in the storyline The Coming of Atlas (Superman #677, August 2008) and followed by the gradual introduction of Project 7734 from Superman: New Krypton Special (December 2008), Superman's Pal Jimmy Olsen Special #1 (December 2008), and Action Comics #871 (January 2009) by Geoff Johns, building through Superman, Action Comics, and the associated Superman titles Supergirl and Jimmy Olsen Special #2 (October 2009).

DC Comics later extended the Corps presence in the DC Universe in a 10-page Human Defense Corps feature in Adventure Comics (vol. 2) #8 (March 2010), directly linking it with the other stories featured in the title as part of the lead up to DC Comics' War of the Supermen event for summer 2010.

== Fictional group history ==
The Human Defense Corps is a branch of the military established by President of the United States Lex Luthor to reduce government dependency on superhumans, act as back-up to Earth's superheroes, and specifically counter any alien threat to Earth. Membership of the Corps is open to 'decorated veterans of alien campaigns only'.

On their first mission, the 1st Special Armoured Division are sent on a reconnaissance trip to the former Soviet satellite Bulgravia to support government troops who had encountered shapeshifting aliens with high firepower weaponry. They are attacked in the Forest of Galantz by vampiric aliens, who kill 66 members of the team.

Two years later, Charlie Graham ascertains that the members of the Corps who were assumed killed in the incident are alive in Hell and that the "vampires" they fought were actually demons. Interrogating the demon Calcabrina, the group discovers that a Bulgravian mage had made a deal for his village to be spared the ravages of civil war in exchange for 66 souls; the Human Defense Corps team had stumbled in and taken the place of the 66. Guided by Calcabrina, the Third Special Armoured Division invade Hell to recover the Corps members. Kelly is supposed killed by the demon he killed two years before in Galatz Forest, but discovers he has demonic blood as a result of the incident, making him immortal and related by blood to the demon clan. He claims the staff of the demon clan's leader Scarmiglione in battle, takes his place, and rescues the 66 men. Kelly and five other members who also gained demonic powers establish a diplomatic link with Hell.

=== Project 7734 ===
Seven years later, Sam Lane covertly works on a program for the U.S government called Project 7734. He takes command of Squad K of the Human Defense Corps and moves the main base of Project 7734 to a planet in another dimension. The Corps now has a new motto and insignia: "Ad Infernos et Retrorsum" (loosely meaning 'To Hell and Back') and technology designed to deal with Kryptonians.

== Membership ==
- Colonel Skynner
- Colonel Perseus Hazard - A member of the K Squad who is killed by Reactron for opposing his lethal actions. He was the grandson of World War II hero Ulysses Hazard / Gravedigger.
- Colonel Reno Rosetti - ordered the kill on the drop site in Galatz Forest, awarded a Distinguished Service Medal
- Sergeant Montgomery Kelly (Specialist First Class) - An ex-Marine and the only survivor of the team from the first mission. He was left in charge of Corps in Hell after gaining demonic powers, but later returned to Earth.
- Sergeant Chad Kiyahani - The grandson of Little Sure Shot, a member of Easy Company.
- Sergeant Dobbs - Killed in Hell and became part of 'Kelly's 5'.
- Jake Grimaldi - Part of the rescue team in Hell. He later joins the Science Police.
- Sergeant Pruett - Details unknown.
- Corporal Taylor -Lilled in Hell and became part of 'Kelly's 5'.
- Specialist Colin Mitchell - Air Force Special Corps, rescued from Hell.
- Private David Page - Rescued from Hell.
- Private Eric Stewart - Ex-Coast Guard, rescued from Hell.
- Private Reynolds - Rescued from Hell.
- Bradley - Rescued from Hell.
- David Page - Presumed killed, as contacted by seance. Rescued from Hell.
- Head Chaplain, Charlie Graham
- Doctor Zaius - A scientist from Gorilla City who studied alien physiology. Zaius later became the lead scientist of Project 7734.

== In other media ==
- Reno Rosetti appears in Superman & Lois, portrayed by Hesham Hammoud. This version is a military lieutenant under Sam Lane. After being empowered by X-Kryptonite off-screen, Rosetti fights Superman until he is killed by John Henry Irons with a kryptonite spear.
  - Additionally, a Bizarro World incarnation of Rosetti appears in the episode "Bizarros in a Bizarro World" as a member of the Department of Defense before defecting to Bizarro Ally Allston's Inverse Method cult.
- The Human Defense Corps appear in My Adventures with Superman, led by Amanda Waller and with Hank Henshaw as a prominent member.
