= David Alpay =

Canadian actor

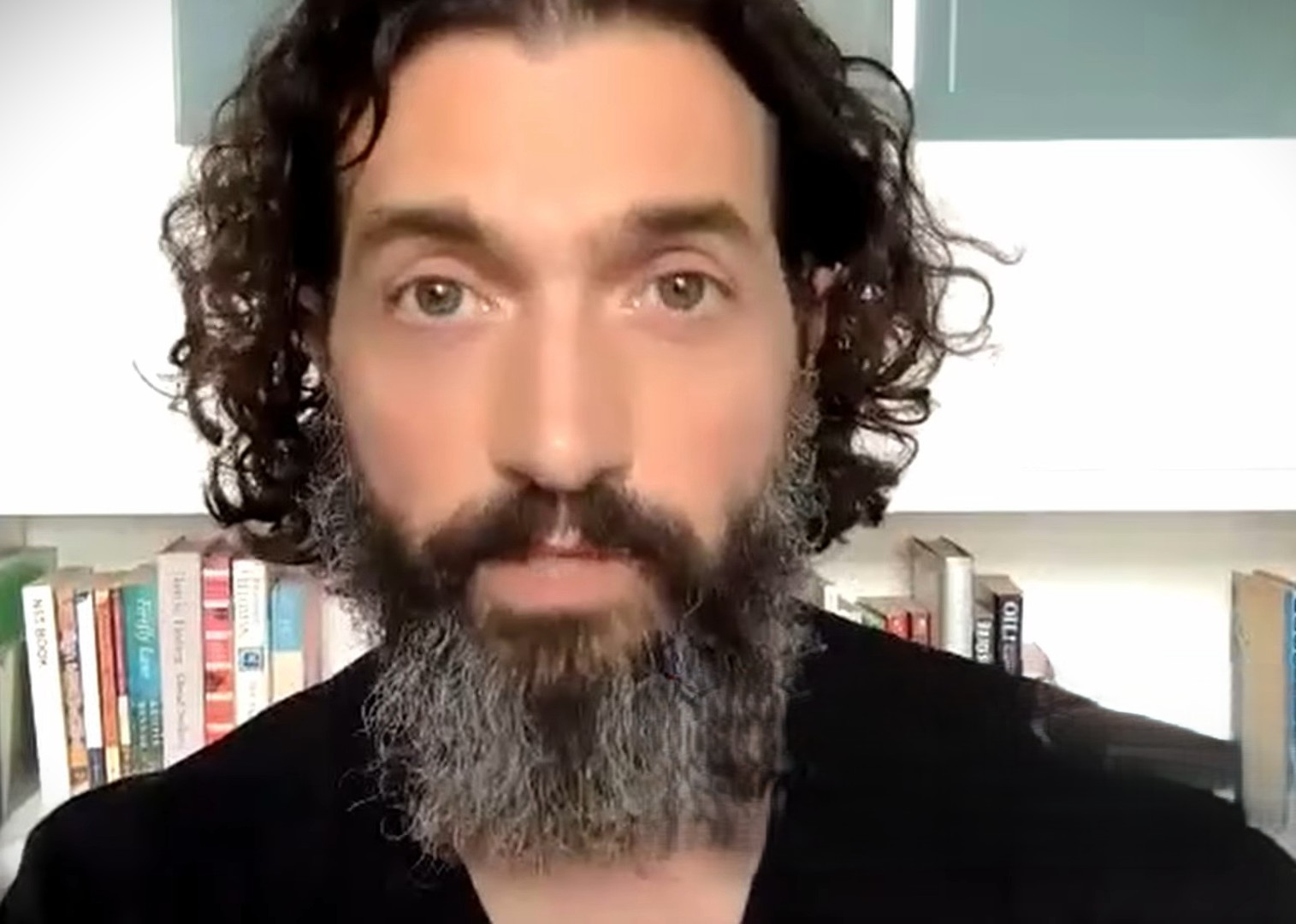
- Alpay in 2024
- Born: Toronto, Ontario, Canada
- Education: University of Toronto
- Occupation: Actor
- Years active: 2002–present
- Known for: The Tudors; From; The Vampire Diaries

David Alpay is a Canadian actor, known for playing Atticus Shane in The Vampire Diaries, Mark Smeaton in The Tudors, and Jade in From.

== Early life and education ==
Alpay was born in Toronto. He attended the University of Toronto and studied biology and computer science.

== Career ==
In 2002, Alpay made his acting debut in the film Ararat, starring alongside Christopher Plummer and Charles Aznavour. He has since appeared in several television and film roles, such as Danny in the political comedy Man of the Year starring Robin Williams, Professor Atticus Shane in The Vampire Diaries, and Mark Smeaton in the Showtime series The Tudors.

In 2022, he appeared as Jade in the TV series From, and continued as a main character through the show's current airing.

== Philanthropy ==
Alpay has engaged in philanthropic activities such as the Armenia Tree Project, an organization aiming to improve standard of living and bettering the global environment.

== Filmography ==
=== Film ===
Year	Film	Role	Notes
2002	Ararat	Raffi	Theatrical film
2005	Whiskey Echo	Dr. Carlo Scanchelli	Television film
2005	Sabah	Mustafa	Theatrical film
2005	Anniversary Present	Lonnie Dobbs	Television film
2005	Martha Behind Bars	Douglas Faneuil	Television film (CBS)
2005	Burnt Toast	Bill	Television film
2005	Category 7: The End of the World	Billy Chamber	Television film (CBS)
2006	Man of the Year	Danny	Theatrical film
2007	All Hat	Paulie Stanton	Theatrical film
2007	Closing the Ring	Chuck	Theatrical film
2008	Inconceivable	Mark	Theatrical film
2009	Ten for Grandpa	Narrator	Television short
2009	Unstable	Woody Monroe	Television film (Lifetime Movies)
2011	Weekends at Bellevue	Ben Jacobs	Television film
2012	Americana	Jesse Soulter	Television film
2015	Ice Sculpture Christmas	David	Television film (Hallmark)
2016	They're Watching	Greg Abernathy	Theatrical film
2016	Sleigh Bells Ring	Alex McCord	Television film (Hallmark)
2017	Prodigals	Wesley	Theatrical film (play adaptation)
2017	The Mistletoe Inn	Zeke	Television film (Hallmark)
2017	The Haunted	Virgil Bradley	Television film
2018	Birdland	Tom Kale	Theatrical film
2018	The Christmas Ring	Michael Jones	Television film (Hallmark)

=== Television ===
Year	Series	Role	Notes
2004	Wild Card	Jack	Season 2, Episode 1
2005	Kevin Hill	Donnelly	Season 1, Episode 22
2005	Slings And Arrows	Patrick	5 Episodes
2007	Billable Hours	Roderick Stelmakie	TV series
2008	The Tudors	Mark Smeaton	9 Episodes
2009	Dollhouse	Seth	1 episode
2009	L.A. Crash	Niles Welch	1 episode
2010	Miami Medical	Zan	1 episode
2011	Fairly Legal	Eric Malloy	1 episode
2011	Rizzoli & Isles	Grayson Bennett	1 episode
2011	Flashpoint	Xavier Dodd	1 episode
2011–2012	The Borgias	Calvino	3 Episodes
2012–2013	The Vampire Diaries	Atticus Shane	11 Episodes
2013	Royal Pains	Santi	1 Episode
2013	Perception	Sario Donati	1 Episode
2013	Drop Dead Diva	Frank Neubauer	1 Episode
2013	CSI: Vegas	Ryan Bonham	1 Episode
2014	Motive	Ian Weaver	1 Episode
2014	The Lottery	Dr. James Lynch	Main role
2015	Backstrom	Arthur Towne	1 Episode
2015-2016	Quantico	Duncan	3 Episodes
2016	Law & Order: Special Victims Unit	Chad Miller	Season 18, Episode 4
2018	Impulse	Daniel	1 Episode
2018	Suits	David Fox	Season 7 + 8
2019	Proven Innocent	Dylan	6 episodes
2019	Castle Rock	Pastor Augustin / Mandolin Player	2 episodes
2021	Debris	Eric King	1 episode
2021	Hudson & Rex	Dean Cody	1 episode
2021	Nancy Drew	Brandon Schmidt	1 episode
2022–present	From	Jade Herrera	Main role
2022	Prism	—	Pilot
2022	Red Rooms	Alex Terzian	8 episodes
2023	Grease: Rise of the Pink Ladies	Mr. Facciano	3 episodes

=== Video games ===
Year	Title	Role	Notes
2017	Call of Duty: WWII	Major Arthur Crowley (voice)	
2023	Diablo IV	Additional Voices	
