= Carrie Genzel =

Canadian actress and producer (born 1971)

- Born: 18 September 1971 (age 55); Vancouver, British Columbia, Canada
- Occupations: Actress; producer; writer
- Years active: 1990–present
- Spouse: Michael Rivellino

Carrie Genzel (born 18 September 1971) is a Canadian actress and film producer.

== Career ==
Genzel had several recurring roles in soap operas during the 1990s, including The Bold and the Beautiful, Days Of Our Lives, and as Skye Chandler on All My Children from 1996 to 1997. She appeared television series such as Picket Fences, Beverly Hills 90210, The Outer Limits, Stargate SG-1, Smallville, Married... with Children, Wizards of Waverly Place, Under One Roof and Supernatural. Her film roles include The Imaginarium of Dr. Parnassus, Dead Rising: Watchtower, They're Watching, and Watchmen.

In 2012, Genzel won the Best Actress award at the Los Angeles International Underground Film Festival for the role of Emma in The Ballerina and the Rocking Horse.

== Filmography ==
=== Film ===
Year	Title	Role	Notes
1991	Ski School	Ed's chick	Uncredited
1995	Caged Hearts	Kate	
1996	The Killer Inside	Monique	
1999	Soccer Dog: The Movie	Reporter	
2001	Amy's Orgasm	Michelle	
2006	Dysfunction	Female agent	Short film
2007	88 Minutes	Stephanie Parkman	
2007	Postal	Reporter Gayle	
2007	BloodRayne: Deliverance	Bernadette	Video
2008	Far Cry	Tourist Laura	
2009	Watchmen	Jackie Kennedy	
2009	The Imaginarium of Doctor Parnassus	Female journalist	
2009	Jennifer's Body	Mrs. Check	
2012	The Ballerina and the Rocking Horse	Emma	Short film
2013	Hot Guys With Guns	Jessica Vagiene	
2013	Assault on Wall Street	Debbie	
2013	Evil Feed	Madame Dragonfly	
2015	Dead Rising: Watchtower	Susan Collier	
2016	They're Watching	Kate Banks	
2016	Trunk	Lawyer	Short film
2017	Max 2: White House Hero	First Lady Maureen Bennett	
2017	The Layover	Buyer	
2018	Parallel	Yvonne Lehmann	
2021	Magic in Mount Holly	Carol Palmer	

=== Television ===
Year	Title	Role	Notes
1995	Virtual Seduction	Paris	TV film
1995	The Bold and the Beautiful	Nurse	6 episodes
1995	Picket Fences	Amy	2 episodes
1995	Married... with Children	Natalie	Episode: "Flight of the Bumblebee"
1995	Crosstown Traffic	Waitress	TV film
1998	Beverly Hills, 90210	Libby	Episode: "Crimes and Misdemeanors"
1995–1998	Days of Our Lives	Lisa, Ali McIntyre	10 episodes
1996–1997	All My Children	Skye Chandler	Recurring role (105 episodes)
2001	The Outer Limits	Lavinia Oleaga	Episode: "Rule of Law"
2001	Stargate SG-1	Diana Mendez	Episode: "Desperate Measures"
2001	Special Unit 2	Lauren	Episode: "The Beast"
2002	Mysterious Ways	Sue Kaplan	Episode: "Friends in Need"
2005	Killer Instinct	Marta Madison	Episode: "13 Going on 30"
2005	Supernatural	Lynda Bloome	Episode: "Bugs"
2006	Dark Storm	Dr. Rakin	TV film
2006	The Dead Zone	Saleswoman	Episode: "Forbidden Fruit"
2006	Kyle XY	Julia Peterson	2 episodes
2006	Reunion	Nancy	Episode: "1995"
2006	Smallville	Dr. Pamela Black	Episode: "Rage"
2006–2007	Whistler	Lawyer #2, Wise	2 episodes
2007	Painkiller Jane	Arlene Watson	Episode: "Portraits of Lauren Gray"
2007	The 4400	Reporter	Episode: "The Great Leap Forward"
2007	Psych	Rosa	Episode: "Gus's Dad May Have Killed an Old Guy"
2007–2008	Flash Gordon	Vestra	Recurring role (6 episodes)
2008	Loch Ness Terror	Sheriff Karen Riley	TV film
2008–2009	Under One Roof	Ashley Hill	Main role (13 episodes)
2009	The Assistants	Leslie Valentine	2 episodes
2009	Wizards of Waverly Place	Aunt Megan	Episode: "Retest"
2009	A Dog Named Christmas	Brianna Lewis	TV film
2010	FlashForward	FBI Agent Conner	Episode: "Let No Man Put Asunder"
2010	Lies Between Friends	Beth Hardy	TV film
2011	Castle	Naomi Dahl	Episode: "Poof! You're Dead"
2011	Femme Fatales	Dr. Marlowe	Episode: "The Clinic"
2011	The Pastor's Wife	Elizabeth Rice	TV film
2012	The Wishing Tree	Amanda Breen	TV film
2012	R.L. Stine's the Haunting Hour: The Series	Mom	Episode: "The Golem: Part 1"
2013	Forever 16	Lillian	TV film
2015	Just the Way You Are	Angela Owens	TV film
2015	Supernatural	Linda Berman	Episode: "Just My Imagination"
2016	Hearts of Spring	Tracy Rhodes	TV film
2016	Season's Greetings	Taylor Armstrong	TV film
2017	The Adventures of Hooligan Squad in World War III	Frankie's mom	TV film
2020	Ivy & Mistletoe	Judy Carson	TV film
2021	The Walking Dead	Clark	Episode: "Archeron: Part 1" and "Archeron: Part 2"
2021–2022	Sistas	Tony	6 episodes
