= They're Watching =

- Theatrical release poster
- Directed by: Jay Lender; Micah Wright
- Screenplay by: Jay Lender; Micah Wright
- Produced by: Mark Lagrimas; Iuliana Tarnovetchi
- Starring: Brigid Brannagh; David Alpay; Dimitri Diatchenko; Kris Lemche; Carrie Genzel; Tatiana Dumitru
- Edited by: Blake Barrie
- Music by: Jonathan Wandag
- Production companies: Best Served Cold Productions; Warsong Entertainment
- Distributed by: Amplify
- Release date: March 25, 2016 (United States)
- Running time: 95 minutes
- Countries: United States; Romania
- Language: English

They're Watching is a 2016 found footage comedy horror film directed and written by Jay Lender and Micah Wright. The film features Brigid Brannagh, David Alpay, Kris Lemche and Dimitri Diatchenko and was released in theaters and on demand on March 25, 2016.

== Plot ==
The film crew of a popular home-improvement television series goes to a remote village in Moldova to film a follow-up segment about an American homeowner, Becky, who's been transforming a rundown house into an artist's haven. The crew, consisting of Greg, Alex and newcomer Sarah, meet with their irritable producer Kate and a Moldovian businessman named Vladimir Filat. While getting some footage of the town, Greg and Sarah sneak into a funeral and attempt to record it, only to be exposed when Kate calls them by cellphone. A police officer manages to calm the furious crowd before ordering the crew to leave.

The crew continue filming during the next few days while experiencing numerous interruptions and receiving hostility and suspicion from the locals, including an old woman who sneaks into Sarah's hotel room to chant a prayer at her. Greg and Alex later show Sarah a video of Greg and Vladimir walking into a barn to find Kate having sex with Becky's boyfriend Goran six months ago when the house was purchased. Despite telling Kate the camera was off at the time, they planned on showing it to their boss should Kate try to get them dismissed from employment. Vladimir tells the crew a story about how the village had been struck by a plague generations previously, and the villagers had accused a woman who lived alone outside of town of being a witch before burning her alive. During the last planned day of filming, Becky shows the crew a mural on the wall of her cellar that depicts the story. They're interrupted by Alex's cries of pain from outside when a dog he was playing with suddenly becomes aggressive and bites him in the arm. They abandon filming to get Alex's wound at a local butcher's shop, and resolve to finish the next day before their flight leaves.

That evening the crew go to a tavern and attempt to make peace with the locals. Everything goes well until a drunk Sarah instigates a fight by shouting "witch" in the local language. The next day, they rush to finish filming at Becky's home so they can leave Moldova as soon as possible. However, they discover their car has been vandalized and rendered unusable, forcing them to spend the night with Becky and to wait for Goran to arrive the next morning. Vladimir offers to walk to town and bring back a taxicab. Kate blames Sarah for the vehicle's destruction due her actions the previous night, causing Sarah to reveal that the affair was recorded.

A few hours later, Becky and Sarah discover Vladimir's dead body crucified onto an outdoor furnace. So the crew barricade themselves inside the house. Later that night, Greg tells Sarah his story about his time in Afghanistan (something he was uncomfortable to talk about earlier in the movie). While filming at an all-girl school, Taliban local police entered the school and executed a child while forcing Greg to film it. As Greg breaks down in tears, Sarah comforts him and the two then have sex. Later they awaken to find Kate gone. The remaining survivors hear a noise and go out to investigate. They find Kate nailed to a wall of the barn with her intestines hanging out. Sarah sees Goran's car in the barn and realizes Becky has been lying about Goran being gone. She and Alex later learn that Becky knew of Goran's affair with Kate when they saw her in the video, watching them through the window. They believe Becky killed them as an act of vengeance including Vladimir because he witnessed the encounter, and realize Greg could be next because he recorded it. Before they could warn him, the villagers begin breaking into the house, forcing everyone to flee into the basement. There, Sarah uncovers a mural that depicts the production crew's entire stay in Moldova. This including their deaths, as well as a demonic Becky surrounded by fire.

Becky reveals herself as a real witch (implied to be the same witch as for Vladimir's story), who brought the crew to Moldova to witness her vengeance on the villagers. She drinks from a large vat of blood that has the decomposed body of her boyfriend floating in it. She disintegrates Greg, prompting Sarah and Alex to escape into the woods. They run into an angry mob of villagers. Sarah is murdered by the police officer with an axe to the head. Becky appears and uses her powers to kill brutally and bloodily all of the villagers while a terrified Alex records everything. After everyone is dead, Becky orders Alex to share the footage of her rampage with the world before disappearing. The movie ends as a blood-soaked and traumatized Alex wonders how he will explain everything to his boss.

== Cast ==
- Brigid Brannagh as Becky Westlake
- David Alpay as Greg Abernathy
- Kris Lemche as Alex Torini
- Carrie Genzel as Kate Banks
- Dimitri Diatchenko as Vladimir Filat
- Tatiana Dumitru as Pavlovka Villager
- Mia Faith as Sarah Ellroy
- Bogdan "Baros" Guta as Village Brute

== Reception ==
On Rotten Tomatoes, the movie has an approval rating of 47% based on 17 reviews, with an average rating of 4.6/10. On Metacritic, the movie has a weighted average of 39 out of 100, based on 7 critics, indicating "generally unfavorable reviews".
