= Dimitri Diatchenko =

American actor (1968–2020)

- Diatchenko at the premiere of True Blood Season 5 in 2012
- Born: April 11, 1968; Oakland, California, U.S.
- Died: April 21, 2020 (aged 52); Daytona Beach, Florida, U.S.
- Occupation: Actor
- Years active: 1997–2017

Dimitri Diatchenko (April 11, 1968 – April 21, 2020) was an American actor. He studied guitar and martial arts from the age of seven and won medals in both. He released four solo guitar CDs. He studied acting and music at Florida State University and appeared in the action film G.I. Jane. In 2015 he pleaded no contest to animal cruelty after allegedly cooking and eating his ex-girlfriend's pet rabbit. He died at age 52 of an accidental overdose of prescription drugs.

== Life and career ==
Diatchenko was born April 11, 1968. Sources differ as to whether he was born in Oakland, California or San Francisco, California. He was of Ukrainian, Greek and Swedish descent. Diatchenko began classical guitar lessons at the age of seven. Two years later, he gave his first solo classical guitar recital. During and after his studies, Diatchenko won several medals in guitar competitions including the Stotsenberg International Classical Guitar Competition or the World Championships of Performing Arts. He released four solo guitar CDs.

Diatchenko studied martial arts from the age of seven. He earned black belts in both Tae Kwon Do and Kenpo Karate and studied boxing and arnis. During the early 1990s, Diatchenko competed as a heavyweight in several national championships, winning many medals in full contact fighting, including the US Olympic Festival, the WTF National Championships and The 1991 World Invitational in Miami, Florida.

Diatchenko attended Newton North High School in Newton, Massachusetts where Matt LeBlanc also attended at the same time and later Stetson University in DeLand, Florida. There he was a scholarship music student, majored in classical guitar, and received a Bachelor of Music degree. After transferring to Florida State University in Tallahassee, Diatchenko continued with acting and music studies in the Masters program. In April 1996, as Diatchenko was graduating, he was cast in Ridley Scott's 1997 action film G.I. Jane and landed a small role as trainee; following this, Diatchenko relocated to Los Angeles to pursue his acting career. In Los Angeles, he also taught guitar privately and performed regularly as a soloist and ensemble player.

Diatchenko made appearances in several television series. After appearing in the action series Alias, he was in the films Indiana Jones and the Kingdom of the Crystal Skull and Get Smart.

For his performance as Ukrainian tour guide Yuri in the film Chernobyl Diaries, Diatchenko received positive reviews from some film critics.

In addition to acting, Diatchenko worked as a voice actor. He lent his voice to a lot of video and computer games. His first performance in a video game came in 2005 with additional voices for Medal of Honor: European Assault.

== Animal cruelty charge ==
In 2015, Diatchenko pleaded no contest to animal cruelty after allegedly cooking and eating his ex-girlfriend's pet rabbit. He was sentenced to three years probation and ordered to perform sixty days of community labor and undergo forty-eight hours of counselling.

== Death ==
Diatchenko died in his home in Daytona Beach, Florida, on April 21, 2020, aged 52. He was discovered two days later after a wellness check initiated by concerned relatives. According to Diatchenko's agent, the death appeared to be a heart attack or complications from an electric shock Diatchenko had sustained at work a week before his death. An autopsy later revealed that there was a large amount of fentanyl and Valium in his system and the medical examiner listed the official cause of death as an accidental overdose of prescription drugs.

== Filmography ==
=== Film ===
Year	Title	Role	Notes
1997	Goiterboy	Richter	Short
1997	G.I. Jane	Trainee	
1999	The Settlement		Uncredited
2001	Norman J. Lloyd	Norman J. Lloyd	Short
2006	The Genius Club	Jesse The Mechanic	
2006	Miriam	Alexi	
2006	Love Made Easy	Poker Player	
2007	The Longest Yard Sale	Grammy	
2008	Remarkable Power	Ivan	
2008	Indiana Jones and the Kingdom of the Crystal Skull	Russian Suit 1 / Russian Soldier	
2008	Get Smart	Russian Underling	
2010	Burning Palms	Bob	
2012	Chernobyl Diaries	Yuri	
2013	Company of Heroes	Ivan Puzharski	Direct-to-video
2013	Clubhouse	Misha	
2016	They're Watching	Vladimir Filat	Final film role

=== Television ===
Year	Title	Role	Notes
1997	Total Security	Bodyguard	Episode: "Pilot"
1997	Diagnosis: Murder	Thug #1 / Carl	Episode: "A Mine Is a Terrible Thing to Waste"
1998	Timecop	Sergeant	Episode: "D.O.A."
1999	Walker, Texas Ranger	Robert Jackson	Episode: "Power Angels"
1999	Pensacola: Wings of Gold	Anton Marisovich	Episode: "True Stories"
2000	V.I.P.		Episode: "Val Point Blank"
2000	18 Wheels of Justice	Alexei	Episode: "Smuggler's Blues", Uncredited
2001	The Wild Thornberrys	Elder Beaver	Voice, Episode: "All Work and No Play"
2001	18 Wheels of Justice	Sergei Zukaross	Episode: "Hot Cars, Fast Women"
2004	Alias	Vilmos	Episode: "The Frame"
2005	Wanted	Darsikska	Episode: "The Wild Bunch"
2006	The Suite Life of Zack & Cody	Waiter	Episode: "Odd Couples"
2006	The Suite Life of Zack & Cody	Attendant 1	Episode: "No So Suite 16"
2007	Criminal Minds	Lyov Lysowsky	Episode: "Honor Among Thieves"
2007	Shark	Gavin Lundy	Episode: "Fall from Grace"
2007	Burn Notice	Boris	Episode: "Pilot"
2008	The Riches	Russian #2	Episode: "The Lying King"
2008	My Own Worst Enemy	Gold Teeth	Episode: "Breakdown"
2008	Without a Trace	Yuri Ovsenko	Episode: "Push Comes to Shove"
2009	CSI: Miami	Andrei	Episode: "Wolfe in Sheep's Clothing"
2009	Family Guy	Russian Dinosaur / Russian Guard #2	Voice, Episode: "Spies Reminiscent of Us"
2010	General Hospital	Babak	3 episodes, Uncredited
2011	Sons of Anarchy	Head Russian	2 episodes
2012	How I Met Your Mother	Arvydas	Episode: "46 Minutes"
2012	Perception	Alexi Topaloff	Episode: "Faces"
2013	Project: SERA	Zakir	Episode: "Immunity"
2014	Bones	Dimitri Romanov	Episode: "The Master in the Slop"
2014	2 Broke Girls	Yuri	Episode: "And the Kilt Trip"
2016	Gortimer Gibbon's Life on Normal Street	Green Beret	Episode: "Gortimer vs. White Hat"
2016	Murder in the First	Janko Kolar	Episode: "Rise of the Phoenix"
2017	Teenage Mutant Ninja Turtles	Vulko / Lone Knight / Lead Knight	Voice, 2 episodes

=== Video games ===
Year	Title	Role	Notes
2005	Medal of Honor: European Assault		
2005	From Russia with Love		
2005	Quake 4	Sledge	
2006	SOCOM U.S. Navy SEALs: Fireteam Bravo 2		
2006	SOCOM U.S. Navy SEALs: Combined Assault	Paramilitary Leader	
2008	Iron Man	Boris Bullski / Titanium Man, Russian Soldiers	
2008	Fracture		
2008	Command & Conquer: Red Alert 3	Cmdr. Oleg Vodnik	
2008	Call of Duty: World at War	The Commissar	
2008	Aion: The Tower of Eternity		
2009	Command & Conquer: Red Alert 3 – Uprising	Cmdr. Oleg Vodnik	
2009	Resistance: Retribution	Cloven Leader / Cloven 2	
2009	Wolfenstein	Golden Dawn Agent / Wehrmacht Officer / Black Market Agent	
2009	Uncharted 2: Among Thieves	Serbian Soldiers	
2009	Rogue Warrior	Russian Soldier 3 / SEAL Captain	
2010	Iron Man 2	General Valentin Shatalov / Roxxon Soldiers	
2010	Singularity		
2010	Crackdown 2		
2010	Spider-Man: Shattered Dimensions	Sandman	
2010	Call of Duty: Black Ops	Spetsnaz Operative	
2011	Uncharted 3: Drake's Deception	Serbian Soldier	
2012	Ghost Recon: Future Soldier	Evgeny Petrakov	
2012	Call of Duty: Black Ops II		
2013	Tomb Raider	Solarii	
2013	Metro: Last Light	Secretary General Moskvin	
2013	The Last of Us		
2015	Evolve	Markov	
2015	Battlefield Hardline		
2015	Fallout 4	Vadim Bobrov	
2015	Rise of the Tomb Raider		
2016	XCOM 2	Soldier	
2016	Deus Ex: Mankind Divided		
2016	Call of Duty: Infinite Warfare		

== Awards and nominations ==
=== Music ===
- 2003: Instrumental and Acting Grand Champion of the World at the World Championships of Performing Arts
