= Prodigals (play) =

One-act play written by Sean Minogue

- Written by: Sean Minogue
- Characters: 6
- Original language: English
- Genre: Drama
- Setting: Sault Ste. Marie, Ontario

Premiere
- Date premiered: May 2011
- Place premiered: Vancouver, British Columbia, Canada

Prodigals is a 2011 play written by Sean Minogue about a group of twenty-somethings in Sault Ste. Marie, Ontario, who spend their days drinking in a bar while awaiting the results of a friend's murder trial.

== Release ==
The play premiered in May 2011 in Vancouver, British Columbia as the first original production of the Twenty-Something Theatre company. The premiere was directed by Peter Boychuk, produced by Sabrina Evertt, stage manager Aliya Rozenberg and featured Tara Pratt as Jen, Timothy Johnston as Wesley, Jameson Parker as Greg, Brandyn Eddy as Nips, Aslam Husain as Eliot, and Kirsten Kilburn as Nina.

A workshop production was previously produced in May 2010 at Vancouver's Havana restaurant and theatre, which also elicited positive reactions from critics.

== Reception ==
The play was described as a "notable accomplishment" by Straight magazine and "an impressive and polished first play" by Vancourier.

== Feature film adaptation ==
Minogue adapted his play into a feature screenplay and sold the option to Vancouver-based production company Whiskaye Films, the company behind the White Ninja web series. The film stars David Alpay and Sara Canning, both of whom previously appeared on The Vampire Diaries television series. Shot in Sault Ste. Marie and Vancouver, the film premiered on November 30, 2017, at the Whistler Film Festival in Whistler, British Columbia, Canada.

Prodigals had in a limited theatrical run in spring 2018 by Toronto-based indie distributor LevelFilm.

== Book publication ==
Latitude 46 Publishing published Prodigals as a book in August 2025. The book was launched in Toronto on September 8, 2025, at Canada's Theatre Museum.

Writing for the Seaboard Review of Books, Anne M. Smith-Nochasak said the play is "not so much about Benny’s trial as it is a story of how we relate to home—why we stay, or why we leave."
