= Robocalypse =

2008 video game

- Developer: Vogster Entertainment
- Publisher: Tecmo
- Writers: Jay Lender, Micah Wright
- Platforms: Nintendo DS, iOS
- Release: NA: November 18, 2008; iOS: September 18, 2009
- Genre: Real-time strategy
- Modes: Single player, Multiplayer

Robocalypse is a 2008 real-time strategy video game developed by Russian studio Vogster Entertainment and published by Tecmo for the Nintendo DS handheld video game console. It is the first of the Robocalypse duology and has only been released in North America. The project was led by Anton Kruglyakov and the story was written by Jay Lender and Micah Wright, former writers for animated TV series The Angry Beavers, SpongeBob SquarePants, and Phineas and Ferb. Players utilize the Nintendo DS' unique controls to build and command an army of robots to defeat an army of rogue robots determined to destroy humanity.

Upon release, the game was praised by critics and regarded to be one of the best RTS games for the Nintendo DS. An iOS port of the game was released nearly a year later, titled Robocalypse: Mobile Mayhem. A sequel, Robocalypse: Beaver Defense, was released for WiiWare in June 2010.

== Plot ==
At Thermidoom Labs, a robot factory, scientist Flaxen Hayer is bewildered to discover that her robots are sharing a product line with toasters. While nerd Myron Mako is discussing the factory's potential safety issues with his boss, an evil robot, Demolisher, suddenly emerges from the factory with a robot army intent on destroying the world. When Flaxen expresses skepticism of making a counter robot army, Myron reveals that he has a brain scanner and uses it on World War II veterans as a template for the intelligence of a new counter robot army, which they get to work making. The robot army enjoys some early success against the Demolisher's troops, before the battle shifts to a desert. Despite great efforts, Myron's army is unable to stop the Demolisher from taking over a mine and stealing crucial fuel from oil wells at an oil field, but manages to secure an orphanage from enemy troops. Then Demolisher pursues the heroes across the desert to a safe house and kidnaps Flaxen before she can get inside. Efforts to rescue her as she lays imprisoned in a wooden cabin enable Demolisher to uncover and activate a secret nuclear missile silo to lay waste to much of the planet.

After the ensuing destruction, which Myron survives by hiding inside one of his commander robots, Commando Joe, his army then resolves to fight back against Demolisher's forces across the nuclear winter wasteland, destroying transmitter towers that can reprogram his robots to betray Myron and serve the Demolisher. A definitive showdown then occurs between Myron's forces and that of the Demolisher. Despite the Demolisher's powerful abilities, including his use of decoy clones, Myron kills the Demolisher, but in his final moments, he reveals that he answers to an alien master. Much to his horror, Myron discovers that it is Flaxen, who is the alien queen in disguise. She also revealed that she arranged the robot uprising to facilitate an invasion of the planet from the beginning, although the certainty of her success suddenly disappears when Myron finds the cave where the aliens are staging their attack from. Myron's army raids the alien invaders, kills Flaxen in an intense battle after she reveals her true appearance and destroys all the technology she used to ferry her invaders to the planet. Myron then laments about losing such a beautiful woman, before discovering a remote control device from Flaxen and a message from her about using it as a time machine to prevent her evil plan and pursue a romance with her despite her true appearance. Myron proceeds to do so and the two depart Earth, never to be seen again, but not without bringing his hero robots back in time and leaving them on the planet, ready to protect it from any further threats.

== Gameplay ==
Robocalypse is controlled entirely with the stylus and touchscreen, with optional, supplemental button controls. The single-player campaign mode has 17 missions across four unique zones, each with different objectives to tackle, as well as optional side objectives, some which are hidden. Up to four players can battle against each other.

== Development ==
Robocalypse was announced on January 22, 2008, by former SpongeBob SquarePants writer Jay Lender.

== Reception ==
Robocalypse has received mostly positive reviews, with an aggregate score of 79.8% and 79 from GameRankings and Metacritic respectively. Daemon Hatfield of IGN awarded it the Editor's Choice in its review, exclaiming that he was glad to see a real-time strategy game made for the Nintendo DS, the genre being so well-suited for the system's touch controls and dual screens. He complimented its controls and AI. He also praised its humor, saying that he finds it to be truly unique. Mike Feinburg of GameSpot also praised it for its tight controls and humor, but described the AI as clumsy and frustrating.

Robocalypse was recognized by the KRI games development conference in Moscow as the best game for portable systems. It also received several Nintendo DS-specific nominations from IGN in their 2008 video game awards, including Best Strategy Game, Best New IP, and Most Innovative Design.
