= Stormwatch: Team Achilles =

American comic book series

- Issue #1 (Art by Whilce Portacio)

Publication information
- Publisher: Wildstorm (DC Comics)
- Schedule: Monthly
- Format: Ongoing series
- Genre: Superhero
- Publication date: September 2002 – August 2005
- No. of issues: 23
- Main character: Stormwatch: Team Achilles

Creative team
- Created by: Micah Ian Wright; Whilce Portacio
- Written by: Micah Ian Wright
- Penciller(s): Whilce Portacio; C. P. Smith; Clement Sauve; Carlos D'Anda; Mark Texeira; Tomm Coker
- Inker: Scott Williams
- Letterer(s): Comciraft; Rob Leigh
- Colorist: Whilce Portacio
- Editor: John Layman

Collected editions
- Volume 1: ISBN 1-4012-0103-2
- Volume 2: ISBN 1-4012-0123-7

Stormwatch: Team Achilles is an American superhero series, the second incarnation of the Image comics Stormwatch. This version was penned by Micah Ian Wright, with illustrations contributed by Whilce Portacio, C. P. Smith, Mark Texeira, Tomm Coker, Carlos D'Anda and Clement Sauve. The longest run for a penciler on the book was by Smith, who drew issues 11–19. The title featured covers by Portacio, Jason Pearson and Michael Golden.

== Publication history ==
=== Overview ===
Stormwatch: Team Achilles differed from earlier incarnations of Stormwatch by focusing primarily on ordinary soldiers recruited from around the world rather than a team composed mainly of superheroes. The series combined military and superhero action with political themes and satire, including storylines involving non-powered operatives and superhuman opponents

The series frequently incorporated political satire into its storylines. One arc involved Citizen Soldier, a patriotic superhuman who led a rebellion against the United States government. The character was compared to Captain America in contemporary coverage. The series also satirized early-2000s American politics, including through the fictional president Patrick Kent, who was portrayed as an analogue of President George W. Bush. Other storylines used governments, political institutions, and superhero organizations.

Some fans called Team Achilles "G.I. Joe for Grownups" and noted comics writer Kurt Busiek wrote "it's like Sgt. Rock, but with Superheroes." Although the enemies in the comic book have been the typical fantastic archetypes seen in comics, the weapons used by the Stormwatch team were mostly real-world weapons systems (such as the Barrett M82A1). Realistic weapons as well as tactics are used by the non-powered Team Achilles members to take down the physically superior enemies seen in the comic.

=== Controversy ===
The book debuted to controversy from the first issue which, due to changes in DC's printing schedule, came out not in October 2002, but instead on September 13, 2002, shortly after the first anniversary of the 9/11 terrorist attacks. To compound the problem, the first issue featured a terrorist superhuman attack on the United Nations, which many readers thought was intended to comment on 9/11 themselves and, thus, in poor taste.

Because Team Achilles (like all previous Stormwatch groups) was a United Nations entity, the book often dealt with realistic political details such as the U.S.'s refusal to pay the U.N. dues, political interference with the goals of the U.N. by conservative American politicians, and the U.N.'s ineptitude and corruption. In the charged political air, the book accurately reflected the disdain that George W. Bush and his administration displayed toward the United Nations.

Detractors of the comic disliked the political tone of the book. Released during a time when the American public was 88% in favor of a military intervention in Afghanistan, Bush had a 65% approval rating, and 72% of the public supported the invasion of Iraq, the book took shots at conservative politics in general, "weapons of mass destruction", the Department of Homeland Security, and America's paranoia regarding terrorism and the accompanying culture of fear. Although the President in the Wildstorm universe is not based on any real politician, some readers felt him to be a mockery of Bush.

Additionally, many superhero fans disliked and disbelieved the concept that 'normal' human beings could ever hope to defeat superheroes. This was notable, given that the main concern of DC Comics (WildStorm's parent company) was to revive and promote 'traditional' pure superhero comics over the darker characters pioneered by Image.

=== Cancellation ===
StormWatch: Team Achilles was canceled in mid-story, along with the rest of the "Eye of the Storm" titles from Wildstorm, such as Wildcats 3.0. Issue #23 ended up being the last issue published. Wright's revised script for Stormwatch #24 is available online. The characters from the book were left isolated in a pocket universe separate from the regular Wildstorm continuity.

Shortly before the 2003 invasion of Iraq, Micah Wright published an anti-war protest book, You Back the Attack, We'll Bomb Who We Want!. The book, a satirical collection of old military propaganda posters repainted to feature modern anti-war messages, featured an introduction where Wright claimed to have been a former United States Army Ranger Sergeant who experienced combat in Operation Just Cause, the 1989 invasion of Panama. Wright gave a radio interview on "Democracy Now!" with Amy Goodman. In 2003, gossip columnist Richard Leiby wrote a 2-page article extolling Wright's poster work for The Washington Post. Wright's credentials were immediately questioned by real Rangers who contacted Leiby. A year later, when Wright learned Leiby was writing an exposé questioning his military service, he confessed and apologized online that he had never served in the military and that his only military experience was as an ROTC student in college.

Following Wright's exposure, Seven Stories Press, the publisher of You Back The Attack, We'll Bomb Who We Want!, canceled Wright's second book of remixed propaganda, If You're Not a Terrorist, Then Stop Asking Questions. The book was later published by a division of Random House. Wright's comic book Stormwatch: Team Achilles was canceled at #23, leaving one issue unpublished.

== Return ==
Team Achilles returned to the Wildstorm Universe during the World's End event in a two-part backup story written by Christos Gage with art by Ivan Reis. The story ran in Wildcats (vol. 5) issue #9 and The Authority (vol. 4) issue #9 and shows the team finally escaping from the Project Entry universe. The walk to Siberia having proven fruitless, Team Achilles has spent the last few years searching for a functional Stormwatch teleporter that can return them home. Finding one and powering it up with the help of Baron Chaos, the team arrives just in time to witness the onset of Armageddon. Flint (having become estranged from Santini during the team's exile) leaves to join up with her former teammates in Stormwatch Prime and Santini vows to continue what they're good at: killing superhumans.

== Characters ==
=== Assault Team ===
Benito Santini – American of Italian Descent, Catholic. Was previously a field leader of International Operations' Black Razors. When John Lynch defected from I.O., he became the Director of Operations, only to lose his post when Ivana Baiul became the Executive Director. After various events in the Wildstorm universe, Santini was later assigned to be the new "Weatherman" to the Stormwatch team, although it's later revealed he has his own agenda to the matter. Despite this, he holds his team members in high regard. Married to Flint.

Blake Coleman – Santini's second-in-command of Stormwatch, field leader and best friend since their Black Razor days, Coleman is the chief on-the-ground commander for the team's early missions, until his untimely death.

Luis Cisco – A close friend of Satini and Coleman who served with them during their Black Razor days. He was scheduled for a leave of absence due to his impending marriage, but ended up joining the team for one last mission on his wedding day. During the course of the mission, the same one that saw the death of Coleman, he received injuries that resulted in his leaving the team.

Victoria "Flint" Ngengi – Formerly of the original Stormwatch team and of the same generation as the Authority's Swift, Flint is only the second superpowered individual on the assault team. Possessing superhuman strength and a high level of resistance nearing that of physical invulnerability, Flint is the team's door kicker. She later falls in love with and marries Santini.

Jukko Hämäläinen – Finnish, former member of the Osasto Karhu (Finnish Anti Terror Squad). One of the last survivors of a superhuman holocaust in that country, and initially the only superhuman-powered member on the assault team. Jukko's powers are more of a curse than a blessing: he feels the pain of any individual within a four kilometers radius. This is one of the reasons this team operative is incredibly caring towards injured hostages, while highly lethal against enemy targets. He also seems to have a profound dislike of the Authority's Midnighter.

Jaeger Weiss – A member of the German GSG 9, Weiss is an incredible handsome, suave, and more often than not sarcastic, but highly reliable team member. He is easily recognizable by the face mask he wears to protect his face when on missions. Being a member of GSG 9, Weiss is often depressed when hostages are injured during operations. Because his entire family was killed by superhumans he harbors a distrust of the superpowered individuals on the team. Nevertheless, he is still good friends with Jukko — the pair often engaging in witty banter on and off mission.

Galena Golovin – Russian sniper, one of the more aggressive team members, is a perfectionist of few, often harsh words. Shares an 'interesting' relationship with her spotter, Pickney.

Charles Cottsworth Pickney – Formerly of the British SAS, his military career stopped dead after he shot his CO in the head in front of the Queen. It didn't seem to matter that his CO was possessed and attempting to assassinate the Queen, his upward mobility ceased and he ended up assigned to Team Achilles. Pickney is almost stereotypically British in demeanor. As spotter to Golovin, he and Golovin share an odd, often argumentative relationship with Golovin either commenting on Pickney's degrading vision or less-than satisfactory manhood.

Ajeet Singh – A Sikh Indian, Ajeet Singh was one of the last "official" Stormwatch members to join the group. He was called into service following Citizen Soldier's attempt to overthrow the US government, and first saw action during the groups raid on Baron Chaos' castle. He was given the option of leaving the group following The Authority's take over of the United States, the idea being that he was so new The Authority would be unaware of his existence. He refused and remained with the group until the series cancellation.

Frederick "Alias" Ngebe Braumholstein – Frederick is a post-human with shape-changing abilities, and is one of the few powered members of Team Achilles. He was brought in following Santini's removal of Senator Sonny Terns, using his shapechanging powers to impersonate the Senator. In a rather ironic twist the Senator was a white conservative racist while Frederick is a liberal mixed-race South African. During his time impersonating the Senator he helped get through various liberal bills and financial aid for various African American organizations. During Citizen Soldier's attempted overthrow of the US government his true identity was revealed, forcing him to abandon his mission and join the Team Achilles field team for the first time. He was given the option of leaving the group follow The Authority's take over of the United States, it was thought that due to the covert nature of mission and the fact that he had never worked with the field team, that The Authority would be unaware of his existence. He refused and remained a member until the series cancellation.

=== Support Team ===
Khalid Tefibi – Stormwatch's resident tech geek, and the individual most often made the butt of jokes by the more macho, hard-charging members of the team. Nonetheless, Tefibi's technological skills and wit prove vital to the teams' success and later their ultimate survival. Further, Colonel Santini reveals in Stormwatch: Team Achilles #16 that he is grooming Tefibi to be his replacement. In Santini's words: "That's why I'm prepping you now, Tefibi...I need someone capable of taking over if I get greased." Tefibi then expresses utter despair at the prospect of such responsibility. Santini recruited Khalid Tefibi from a federal prison where he was spending time for hacking into the Pentagon.

Avi Barak – A member of the Israeli Defense Force, Barak is an "inductive telepath" first introduced in issue 4: his powers are such that, if he asks you a question, and you do not answer truthfully, he instantly absorbs the information from your mind. Through Santini's efforts, his power level is raised to a much higher rating, although it has left the psi a little less than balanced.

Dr. Marie Grunier – Recruited from the French Gendarmerie, Grunier serves a dual role as the teams medical doctor and, when needed, as the teams hostage negotiator. She was romantically linked to Hämäläinen.

Buzz Dixon – Originally a StormWatch reservist, the creature known as Buzz Dixon was later recruited by Colonel Benito Santini as his chief scout and gatherer of difficult-to-get information on the Achilles team. Dixon handles nearly all of the team's recon work as Team Achilles' scouting specialist and primary intel-gatherer. He is often the first on the field, as he reconnoiters mission targets and locations pre-insertion. Buzz Dixon possesses compound eyes, large fan-shaped ears, chameleon-like skin that allows him to become nearly invisible, and superhuman senses. He also has a "sixth sense" in the form of low-grade telepathy: he can mentally "speak" in others' heads and receive thoughts, but generally only if they are nearby. Further, Buzz Dixon can cling to walls with the sucker-like pads on the bottoms of his feet, and he possesses a prehensile tail. Dixon is loud-mouthed, boisterous, uses contemporary slang, and has the sort of stereotypical mannerisms of a cowboy-type or jarhead-type character.

=== Other notable characters ===
- Baron Chaos – Baron Kemeny Zsigmond von Chaos first came into conflict with Team Achilles during his attempt to seize control of Romania. He held his own against several members until the intervention of the teams telepath, Avi Barak. He was stripped of his armor and then shot in the head and left for dead, only to be inadvertently rescued by The Authority. He was brought aboard the Carrier where the Authority were able to save his life with the intention of finding out the whereabouts of Team Achilles, but with the aid of a naive nurse named Mandy he managed to escape to New York City where he promptly made his way to the Romania embassy to plot his revenge. Not long after he was contacted by Jumpmaster who had been contacted by Senator Terns from The Project Entry Universe. Together, Chaos, Citizen Soldier and Senator Terny concocted a plan to rid themselves of Team Achilles once and for all. Chaos is clearly a homage to the Marvel Comics character Doctor Doom. Both have facial scars, both are Eastern European, and both wear high tech suits of armor that provide them with an array of offensive and defensive capabilities including, flight, energy blasts, enhanced strength, teleportation and force fields. More telling is the similar personalities of both characters: They are both uncannily resilient, arrogant, self-assured, and refer to themselves in the third person. Chaos also has several sets of the armor as backups, including one stashed in the Romanian embassy in New York City.
- Citizen Soldier – Citizen Soldier is the repeatedly reincarnating spirit of George Washington, although Santini is not aware of this: the Soldier's earliest identified incarnation was Major Alexander Abernathy, a member of the Union Cavalry during the Civil War. Stormwatch had information on every incarnation up until 1947 when he apparently vanished from the public eye. The Citizen Soldiers during this time were later revealed to have been assassinated for various reason by members of the US government, including Junior Senator Sonny Terns. In 2003, Citizen Soldier resurfaced in the form of Steve Gatesniak, a multi-billionaire computer entrepreneur. For over 20 years Citizen Soldier had built up his wealth while assembling an army of loyal followers and employees who would help him dispose of, what he believed to be, the hopelessly corrupt US government. He began his attack by robbing The Federal Reserve on Wall Street, the same attack which resulted in the death of Blake Coleman. Following this he launched various attacks upon the Senate, the Supreme Court, the global satellite network, the stock market and more. During this time he also projected his own memories into the heads of American citizens via their dreams, showing them the various demises of past incarnations. Ultimately Stormwatch was able to foil his plans and were about to apprehend him with plans to place him in a cryogenic holding unit preventing any further reincarnations, when he was killed by a member of Ivana Baiul's Civil Defense Administration known as Giant. Soon after Citizen Soldier manifested in the body of a newborn illegal Chinese immigrant. He was last seen in the Project Entry universe. Citizen Soldier displayed a number of powers, most notably was his above average speed, strength and combat ability. He also had the power to temporarily instill normal humans with superhuman powers, similar to that of a Christine Trelane and other Seedling Activators. Unlike a normal Activator however, these powers were limited to a few hours and would ultimately kill the person they were bestowed upon. It was implied that this was because other Activators triggered latent powers in those possessing them, while he could trigger powers for those with no inner potential. He also wielded a circular shield in a manner similar to that of Captain America.
- Deadhead – A superhuman with the ability to animate the dead and a skull for a face. He was captured and later placed in the Project Entry Universe along with Sonny Terns and Dhul Fiqar.
- Jumpmaster – A superhuman with the ability to create star-shaped portals. He escaped Stormwatch and would later be seen acting as an intermediary between Senator Terns, Baron Chaos and Citizen Soldier.
- Emoticon – A powerful telepath who was also hideously deformed. He resemble a giant mutant fetus and during his first and only appearance in the series was shown to be floating in a giant, liquid-filled tube. He was killed by Golovin.
- Senator Sonny Terns – Sonny Terns is the product of Southern Royalty. His family owned large tracts of land dating back several generations, beginning with his great-great-great-great grandfather, Augustus Terns, who started the family fortune with his success in the slave trade. He first encountered Santini during a hearing regarding UN funding of his new Stormwatch unit. Terns was steadfast in his resolve to quash the unit, delaying the budget approval for quite a while. Later he would also be connected to Ivana Baiul, the UN Special Security Council, and the superpowered Arab terrorists who attacked the UN in the first three issues of the series. Shortly after the attack on the UN, Santini, along with Weiss and Tefibi, confronted and kidnapped the Senator, holding him in a secret wing of their detention facilities beneath the UN, it was during this time that 'Alias' would assume the Senator's identity. He was held in secret until the events of Coup D'état forced Team Achilles to abandon their UN base. At this point Santini stranded him on a tropical island on Project Entry's Earth along with Deadhead and Dhul Fiqar, two other Team Achilles prisoners. He remained on the island until the end of the series when he escaped with the help of Deadhead. Tern then contacted Baron Chaos and the remained of Citizen Soldiers forces, and together the trio hatched a plot to finally do away with Santini and Team Achilles. Terns was also a low-grade "psychic broadcaster" capable of projecting his thoughts into the minds of others.

== Bibliography ==
=== Series and one-shots ===
- Stormwatch: Team Achilles #1 – 23 (September, 2002 – August, 2004)
- Coup D'État: Stormwatch Team Achilles (April 2004)

=== Significant stories ===
- Stormwatch: Team Achilles #0 – a six-page story from Wizard Magazine #129 (July, 2002).
- Eye of the Storm Annual 2003 (July, 2003)

=== Collected editions ===
- Stormwatch: Team Achilles vol. 1 (collects #0,1–6, 160 pages, July 2003, ISBN 1-4012-0103-2)
- Stormwatch: Team Achilles vol. 2 (collects #7–11, Eye of The Storm Annual #1, 176 pages, January 2004, ISBN 1-4012-0123-7)
- Stormwatch: Team Achilles vol. 3 (collects #12–19, 192 pages, scheduled for August 2004 but postponed indefinitely, ISBN 1-4012-0289-6)
- Coup D'état (collects "Coup D'état" #1–4, 160 pages, November, 2004, ISBN 1-4012-0570-4)

== See also ==
- List of government agencies in DC Comics
- United Nations in popular culture
