= Twenty-Something Theatre =

Twenty-Something Theatre is an independent theatre company in Vancouver, British Columbia, Canada, led by Artistic Director Sabrina Evertt.

Along with productions of works by playwrights, Twenty-Something Theatre holds an annual Spotlight production series that showcases one emerging Vancouver-area artist (rotating between actor, director, and playwright), and provides them with an opportunity to gain exposure. In 2010, the company developed and staged a workshop production of its first original play: Prodigals by Sean Minogue.

Theatre critic Colin Thomas wrote that "Twenty-Something Theatre performs an important function in Vancouver’s cultural ecology".

== Chronology of Plays ==
- 2006
  - This is Our Youth by Kenneth Lonergan
- 2007
  - The Shape of Things by Neil Labute
- 2008
  - The Fever by Wallace Shawn
  - SubUrbia by Eric Bogosian
- 2009
  - Anne Frank is in My Dreams by Lee Cookson
  - Unidentified Remains and the True Nature of Love by Brad Fraser
- 2010
  - Prodigals (workshop production) by Sean Minogue
  - Blue Surge by Rebecca Gilman
- 2011
  - Nocturne by Adam Rapp
  - Prodigals by Sean Minogue
  - Tough! by George F. Walker
- 2012
  - The Bomb-itty of Errors by Jordan Allen-Dutton, Jason Catalano, Gretogy Qaiyum and Erik Weiner
- 2013
  - Us & Everything We Own by Sean Minogue
