= Wetworks (comics) =

American comic book series

- Wetworks #1 (June 1994), art by Whilce Portacio

Publication information
- Publisher: WildStorm (Image Comics, later DC Comics)
- Schedule: Monthly
- Format: Ongoing series
- Publication date: vol. 1: June 1994 – August 1998 vol. 2: November 2006 – January 2008
- No. of issues: vol. 1: 43 vol. 2: 15
- Main character(s): Dane (Jackson Michael Dane); Mother One (Rachel L. Rhodes); Sebastian Ashe; Persephone; Dustwalker (Ab-Death); Claymore (Clayton H. Maure); Dozer (Joseph H. Mendoza); Grail (Salvador Joel Alonday); Jester (Cord Dexter Lemoyne); Pilgrim (Maritza Blackbird); Blackbird (Nathaniel Blackbird). Crossbones (deceased). Flattop (deceased)

Creative team
- Created by: Whilce Portacio (artist); Brandon Choi (writer)

Collected editions
- Rebirth: ISBN 1-887279-33-4
- Book 1: ISBN 9781401213756
- Book 2: ISBN 9781401216399

Wetworks is an American comic book series created by comic book artist Whilce Portacio and writer Brandon Choi. It ran for four years before ending in 1998. A second series written by Mike Carey, with Portacio returning on art duties, was started in 2006 and ended in 2008.

The story is about a team of black operative soldiers bonded with golden symbiotes, who battle against supernatural forces.

== Publication history ==
Originally intended as one of the core Image Comics launch titles in 1992, the series was put on hiatus until 1994 due to the death of Portacio's sister. After re-solicitation by Image (through Jim Lee's Wildstorm imprint), the original series ran for 43 issues, from 1994–1998. The first 3 issues were collected as a trade paperback in 1996 from Image Comics / WildStorm Productions.

A relaunch of the same title began in 2006 by writer Mike Carey and creator Whilce Portacio. It follows the original team leader, Dane, as he and Mother One form a new Wetworks team to continue combating supernatural forces. As of issue #10 the creative team changed to writer J. M. DeMatteis and artists Joel Gomez and Trevor Scott, with Portacio remaining on as cover artist. The new series was cancelled with issue #15.

Wetworks reappeared as one of the one-shots in Wildstorm: Armageddon, but it was not one of the series restarted following the World's End events.

== Plot ==
Wetworks is a covert operations team in the Wildstorm Universe, designated Team 7, led by Colonel Jackson Dane, who was a member of the original Team 7. In issue #1 of the series, Team 7 was sent on a (suicide) mission by International Operations' (I/O) Director Miles Craven. The mission was to enter a terrorist enclave on the Raanes Peninsula (Eastern Europe) and extract a biological agent the terrorists had in their possession. Once the team reached the target, they found out that someone had raided the enclave before them. While investigating, the team found several big transparent tubes containing a golden fluid. At that moment, the explosives they were carrying were activated by remote control, displaying a ten-minute countdown. The team realizes they have been double-crossed.

A hidden sniper shot at one of the tubes when team member Clayton "Claymore" Maure was examining it. The tube broke and the golden fluid jumped on Claymore as if it were alive, covering his whole body. Claymore is attacked by terrorists, but their bullets bounce off his body. Dane decided the team should open the remaining tubes to use the golden symbiotes as protection against the detonation of the explosives.

Wetworks original team (vol. 1)

After the detonation, the enclave was destroyed, but Team 7 emerged from the fire unharmed. I/O's cleaners (three aircraft) were ordered to enter the site to kill the surviving team members. The field leader of the cleaners, Mother One, double-crossed I/O and shot down two aircraft before destroying her own. Mother One also had a golden symbiote, although it was not shown how she acquired it.

Mother One explained to Team 7 they were double-crossed by Craven and I/O and asked them to accompany her to her boss, industrialist Armand Waering.

Col. Dane reluctantly accepted and they started to work for Waering. Waering told them that he wanted to kill the Vampire Nation because they wanted to take over the world from the humans. What he did not tell the team was that he was actually the Jaquar, leader of the Werenation.

Two members of Wetworks died early in their battles with the undead – Flattop and Crossbones. Later Pilgrim's brother, Nathaniel Blackbird joined the squad, and they learned that both he and Pilgrim (unknown to her) were both werewolves. Several members of the squad died during a major mission some time later, including Dozer and Claymore, and Wetworks broke up. Recently Dane has reactivated the team to deal with breaks in reality caused by another superteam, which have been turned into portals for forces from another dimension.

=== World's End ===
After the massive destruction dealt to Earth in the Number of the Beast miniseries, Lynch, head of the former Team 7, tries to convince Dane and the Wetworks into rejoining the Team, in an attempt to reverse the devastation and restore Earth to its former state.

Dane refuses his proposal since he no longer believes in a simple solution, and prefers tasking the Wetworks of defending humanity from the vampires. This is further detailed in Stormwatch – PHD as that team is targeted by Eastern European vampires.

== Characters ==
=== Original series members ===
- Claymore (Sgt. Clayton H. Maure)
- Crossbones (Nicholas A. Jones)
- Dane (Col. Jackson Michael Dane), member of the original Team 7
- Dozer (Sgt. Joseph H. Mendoza) (Rank of Sgt. Although being a SEAL with the rank of Petty Officer Second Class.
- Flattop (Jason C. Phillips)
- Grail (Salvador Joel Alonday)
- Jester (Lt. Cord Dexter Lemoyne)
- Mother-One (Rachel L. Rhodes)
- Pilgrim (Major Maritza Blackbird)
- Blackbird (Nathaniel Blackbird)

=== Second series members ===
- Dane (Col. Jackson Michael Dane)
- Mother-One (Rachel L. Rhodes)
- Red (Persephone)
- Dustwalker (Ab-Death)
- Det. Sebastian Ashe

== Collected editions ==
One collection of the first series has been released:

- Wetworks: Rebirth (collects #1–3, 96 pages, Image Comics / WildStorm Productions, October 1996, ISBN 1-887279-33-4)

The new series has been collected in two trade paperbacks:

- Wetworks Book 1 (collects #1–5 plus two short stories, 136 pages, Wildstorm, October 2007, ISBN 978-1-4012-1375-6)
- Wetworks Book 2 (collects #6–9 and 13–15, 160 pages, Wildstorm, January 2008, ISBN 978-1-4012-1639-9)

== In other media ==
- The Pilgrim appears in Legends of Tomorrow, portrayed by Faye Kingslee. This version is an assassin working for the Time Masters.
- McFarlane Toys produced two waves of Wetworks action figures from 1995 to 1996.
