= Whilce Portacio =

Comic artist

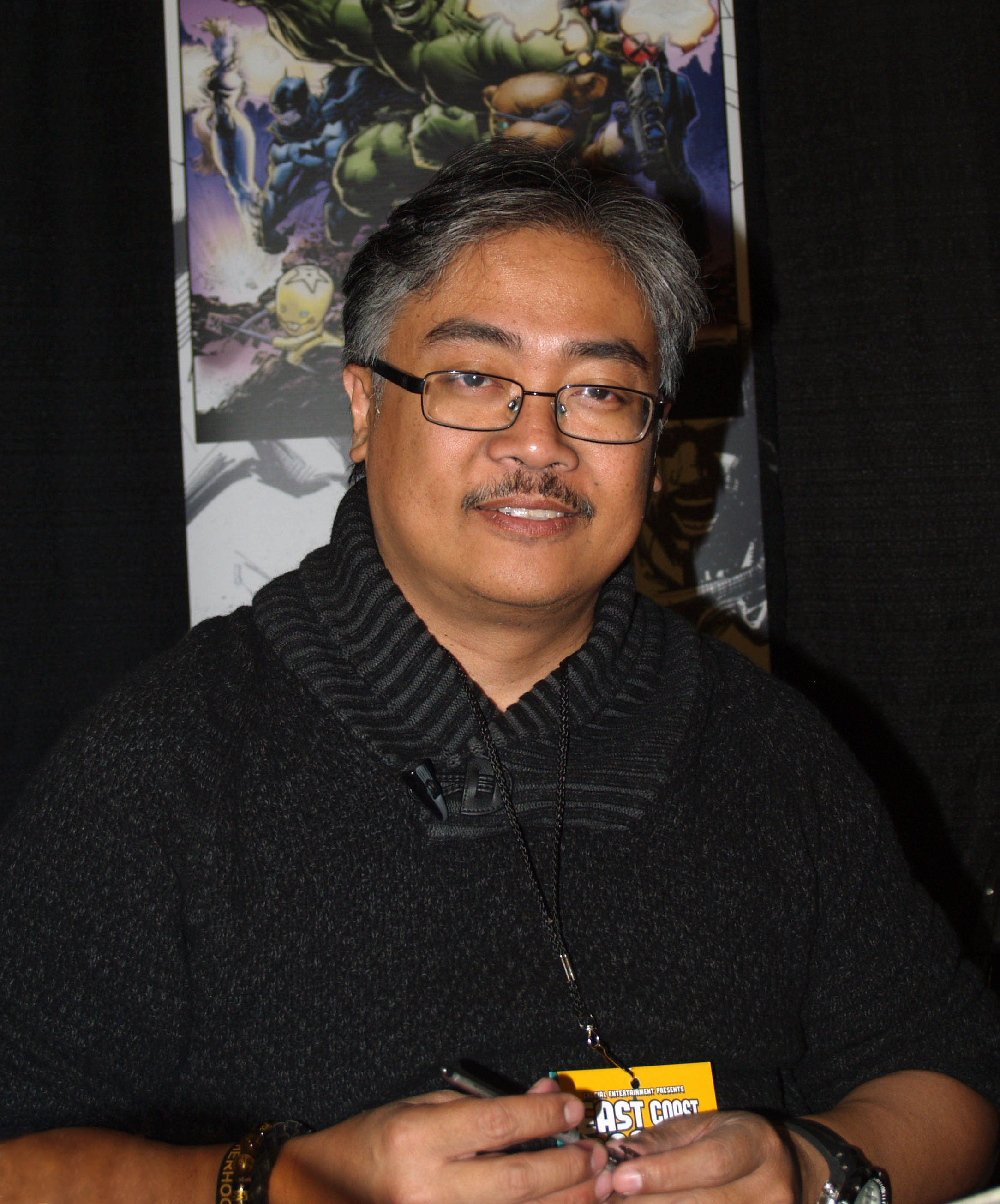
- Portacio at the 2015 East Coast Comicon in Secaucus, New Jersey
- Born: William Portacio; July 8, 1963 (age 63) Cavite City, Philippines
- Areas: Penciller, inker, writer
- Notable works: Iron Man; Punisher; Spawn; Stone; Uncanny X-Men; Wetworks
- Awards: Inkpot Award (2012)

William "Whilce" Portacio (/pɔːrˈtɑːʃi.oʊ/; born July 8, 1963) is a Filipino American comic book writer and artist noted for his work on such titles as The Punisher, X-Factor, Uncanny X-Men, Iron Man, Wetworks and Spawn. Portacio was also one of the seven co-founders of Image Comics, though he did not become a full-partner in the company, and is therefore not a member of its board of directors.

== Early life ==
Whilce Portacio was born July 8, 1963 in Sangley Point, Cavite City, Philippines. He grew up in places such as Midway Island and New Mexico before his family settled in San Diego, California. He began reading comic books at the age of ten, when his neighbor decided to get rid of her husband's collection, and through this, he discovered the work of creators such as Jack Kirby and Neal Adams, who were the two most important influences on Portacio's art. Though Portacio dreamed of becoming an astronaut, his height and eyesight did not meet the necessary requirements, which determined that art would be his vocation. In high school, he continued to create his comic books with his long-time friend, Scott Williams, who would one day be a prolific comic book inker in the industry.

== Career ==
Cover to X-Factor #68 (vol. 1, July, 1991), by Whilce Portacio.

Portacio attended his first comic book convention in San Diego, where Marvel Comics editor Carl Potts, upon seeing Portacio's portfolio, offered him the job inking over Frank Cirocco and Chris Warner's pencils on the 1984 series Alien Legion. The following year, he inked over Art Adams' pencils on the 1985 miniseries Longshot.

Later he was given assignments as a penciller, and became noted for his work on such titles as The Punisher, X-Factor, and The Uncanny X-Men, for which he co-created the character Bishop with John Byrne. Bishop first appeared in Uncanny X-Men #282, published in November 1991.

Stan Lee interviewed Portacio in the 1991 documentary series The Comic Book Greats.

In 1992, Portacio left Marvel to co-found Image Comics with six other high-profile artists. He quickly withdrew from Image due to his sister's illness. He eventually published his title Wetworks through Jim Lee's Wildstorm imprint in 1994. Other notable series that Portacio worked on include Stone and Marvel's controversial Heroes Reborn storyline within Iron Man. At this time Portacio's artwork is notable for his impressive, action-packed splash pages with one character dominating the page borders.

In 1998, he started Avalon Studios with Brian Haberlin.

In August 2000, Portacio fell into a diabetic coma as a result of a failing pancreas. He woke up a week later, thirty pounds lighter, and unable to walk, stand or even draw. Only six months later was he able to pick up a pencil and draw. According to his blog, "My mind could see what I wanted to draw but my hand couldn't accomplish it."

In 2006, Portacio returned to his artistic duties at Wildstorm on Wetworks vol. 2, which was being written by Mike Carey. Portacio left the book with issue #6. He also began art duties on the monthly DC Comics series Batman Confidential.

On June 9, 2008, it was announced that Portacio would be the new artist on Spawn starting in October 2008 with issue #185, providing pencils with Spawn creator Todd McFarlane returning as co-writer with Brian Holguin as the new creative team.

Following his run on Spawn, he has done more work with Marvel. He contributed pencils to Hulk #18 in 2008 and had a run on The Uncanny X-Men.

Two pages of Portacio and Arthur Adams' Longshot were up for auction in the 2021 April 1–4 Comics & Comic Art Signature Auction in Dallas, where the starting prices were $2,600 and $6,250, respectively.

In July 2021, Marvel announced that Portacio was one of the various Asian artists for the book Marvel's Voices: Identity #1, in which he would contribute the art for the character Wave (Pearl Pangan).

== Bibliography ==
=== DC ===
- Authority, vol. 2, #14 (2004)
- Authority, vol. 3, #6 (2005)
- Batman Confidential #1–6 (2007)
- Batman: Gotham Knights (Batman Black and White) #47 (2004)
- Batman/Joker: Deadly Duo #5 (variant cover)
- Coup D'Etat: The Authority (2004)
- Eye of the Storm Annual #1 (2003)
- Stormwatch: Team Achilles #1–10 (2002–03)
- Superman/Batman #57–59 (2009)
- Wetworks vol. 2, #1–6 (2006–07)

=== Image / Top Cow ===
- Artifacts, limited series, #5–8 (2011)
- Darkness #84 (2010)
- Deathmate #Black (among other artists) (1993)
- Non Humans, miniseries, #1–4 (2012–13)
- Image United #1–3 (2009–2010)
- Spawn #185–192, 194–195, 197 (2008–2009)
- Stone #1–4 (1998–1999)
- Stone, vol. 2 #1–4 (1999–2000)
- Tales of the Darkness #1–2 (1998)
- Wetworks vol. 1, #1–9, 11–12, 14 (1994–96)
- Youngblood #100 (variant cover) (2026)

=== Marvel ===
- Age of X-Man Alpha #1 (variant cover) (2019)
- Alpha Flight #51-54 (inks) (1987)
- Avengers Assemble vol. 2, #2 (variant cover) (2024)
- Bishop: War College #1 (variant cover) (2023)
- Cable vol. 3, #1 (variant cover) (2017), vol. 5, #1-4 (cover) (2024)
- Cable and X-Force #8 (variant cover) (2013)
- Champions vol 2 #1 (variant cover) (2016)
- Conan the Barbarian (cover) #243 (1991)
- Daredevil Annual #5 (1989)
- Daredevil vol 8 #1 (variant cover)
- Darth Vader #1 (variant cover) (2015)
- Deadpool: Black, White & Blood #1 (2021)
- Deadpool: Seven Slaughters #1 (2023)
- Deadpool Wolverine #6 (cover) (2025)
- Fantastic Four, vol. 2, #4 (cover inks) (1996)
- Gambit Vol 6 #1-5 (cover) (2022)
- Hulk, vol. 2, #18 (2009)
- Incredible Hulk, vol. 3, #2 (along with Marc Silvestri and Billy Tan), 4–7 (2011–12), vol. 4 #1 (variant cover) (2011)
- Iron Man, vol. 2, #1–3, 4 (cover), 6–8, 11 (1996–97), vol. 8, #5 (variant cover) (2026)
- Journey into Mystery #628–629, 631 (2011)
- Kanan - The Last Padawan #1, 4 (variant cover) (2015)
- Kid Venom #1 (variant cover) 2024
- Legion of Night #1–2 (1991)
- Major X #3 (2019)
- Marvel's Voices: Identity #1 (2021)
- Mortal Thor #8 (variant cover) (2026)
- New Avengers, vol. 2, #18 (2011), vol. 5, #1 (variant cover) (2025)
- Prelude to Deadpool Corps, miniseries, #2 (2010)
- Power Pack #46 (1989)
- Punisher vol 1, #8–18 (1988–89); (cover) #19 (1989); vol 11 #7 (variant cover) (2017)
- Spider-Gwen #1 (variant cover) (2015)
- Spider-Man/Deadpool #9 (variant cover) (2016)
- Strange Tales (Cloak & Dagger) #12 (1988)
- Strikeforce: Morituri #1, 10, 16 (1986–87); (cover) #17 (1987); (cover inks) #19 (1988)
- Stryfe's Strike File, one-shot (among other artists) (1993)
- Queen In Black Defenders Of Light And Dark #1 (variant cover) (2026)
- Uncanny Avengers vol 3 #3, 15 (variant cover) (2015-16)
- Uncanny Inhumans #3, 15 (variant cover) (2016-17)
- Uncanny X-Men vol 1(cover inks): #201 (1986); (full art): #267, 281–286, 289–290, 522, 526 (1990–92, 2010); (along with Leonard Kirk): #527–529 (2010); vol 4 #6 (variant cover) (2016)
- Undead Iron Fist #1-4 (cover) (2025)
- Ware of the Realms Uncanny X-men #1 (variant cover) (2019)
- Weapon X-Men #c (variant cover) (2024)
- Wolverine vol. 7, #39 (variant cover) (2023), vol 8 #22 (variant cover) (2026)
- X-Factor #63–69 (1991)
- X-Force (full art): #102–105; (along with Paco Medina): #106, 107 (cover), 108, 109 (cover) (2000)
- X-Men vol. 5, #1 (variant cover) (2019)
- X-Men Legends vol. 2, #6 (writer/artist) (2023)
- X-Men Prime #1 (variant cover) (2017)

== Notes ==
Preceded by Series creator	Wetworks artist 1994–1996; 2006–present	Succeeded by ?
Preceded by Jim Lee	Uncanny X-Men artist (with Jim Lee); 1991–1992	Succeeded by Brandon Peterson
Preceded by Walter Simonson	X-Factor (vol. 1) artist 1991	Succeeded by Larry Stroman
