= Jay Lender =

American television writer and director (born 1969)

- Born: June 14, 1969 (age 57); New Haven, Connecticut, U.S.
- Occupations: writer, storyboard artist, director, writer
- Years active: 1994–present
- Known for: SpongeBob SquarePants; Phineas and Ferb; Hey Arnold!

Jay Lender (born June 14, 1969) is an American television writer, storyboard artist and director. He is a former writer and storyboard director for SpongeBob SquarePants. Previous to his work on SpongeBob, Lender designed and drew backgrounds for Nickelodeon's Hey Arnold!. He is the son of the founder of Lender's Bagels, Murray Lender.

Since leaving Nickelodeon, Lender has written scripts for video games with his writing partner Micah Wright, and continues to develop animated series concepts as well as drawing the occasional SpongeBob comic strip for Nickelodeon Magazine. Most recently, the duo worked together on Robocalypse, a real-time strategy game for the Nintendo DS.

Lender spent two years studying at the Rhode Island School of Design before transferring to CalArts where he specialized in animation. Lender has also directed two seasons of Disney Channel's Phineas and Ferb.

== Filmography ==
=== Film ===
Year	Film	Role	Notes
1994	The Pagemaster	additional special effects animator	
1997	Loose Tooth	in between artist scene planner	special thanks
2001	Paper Clips	creative consultant	
2003	Wonderful Days	writer	uncredited
2016	They're Watching	director and screenwriter	
2024	Saving Bikini Bottom: The Sandy Cheeks Movie	storyboard artist	

=== Television ===
Year	Film	Role
1996	C Bear and Jamal	storyboard artist
1996–1999	Hey Arnold!	storyboard artist layout designer
1997	The Angry Beavers	storyboard artist
1999–2004	SpongeBob SquarePants	writer storyboard director storyboard artist songwriter staff writer
2009–2012	Phineas and Ferb	director assistant director

=== SpongeBob SquarePants episodes ===
- Season 1
  - "Hall Monitor" (writer, storyboard artist)
  - "Opposite Day" (writer, storyboard artist)
  - "Valentine's Day" (writer, storyboard artist)
  - "The Paper" (writer, storyboard artist)
  - "Neptune's Spatula" (writer, storyboard artist)
  - "Mermaid Man and Barnacle Boy II" (writer, storyboard artist)
- Season 2
  - "Big Pink Loser" (writer, storyboard director)
  - "Bubble Buddy" (writer, storyboard director)
  - "Patty Hype" (writer, storyboard director)
  - "Life of Crime" (writer, storyboard director)
  - "I'm Your Biggest Fanatic" (writer, storyboard director)
  - "Pressure" (writer, storyboard director)
  - "Graveyard Shift" (writer, storyboard director)
  - "Krusty Love" (writer, storyboard director)
  - "The Fry Cook Games" (writer, storyboard director)
  - "Sandy, SpongeBob, and the Worm" (writer, storyboard director)
- Season 3
  - "SpongeGuard on Duty" (writer, storyboard director)
  - "Just One Bite" (writer, storyboard director)
  - "Mermaid Man and Barnacle Boy IV" (writer, storyboard director)
  - "Can You Spare a Dime?" (writer, storyboard director)
  - "Squilliam Returns" (writer, storyboard director)
  - "Rock-a-Bye Bivalve" (writer, storyboard director)
  - "Clams" (writer, storyboard director)
  - "The Camping Episode" (writer, storyboard director, songwriter)
  - "Plankton's Army" (writer, storyboard director)
  - "The Sponge Who Could Fly" (writer & storyboard director for live-action segments)

=== Phineas and Ferb episodes ===
- Season 2
  - "Finding Mary McGuffin" (director)
  - "What Do It Do?" (director)
  - "Picture This" (director)
  - "Suddenly Suzy" (director)
  - "Candace's Big Day" (director)
  - "Wizard of Odd" (director)
  - "The Beak" (assistant director)
  - "Phineas and Ferb-Busters" (director)
  - "Robot Rodeo" (director)
  - "The Doof Side of the Moon" (director)
  - "The Lemonade Stand" (director)
  - "Ladies and Gentlemen, Meet Max Modem!" (director)
  - "Nerds of a Feather" (director)
  - "Split Personality" (director)
  - "Brain Drain" (director)
- Season 3
  - "Run, Candace, Run" (director)
  - "The Great Indoors" (director)
  - "Canderemy" (director)
  - "The Belly of the Beast" (director)
  - "Phineas' Birthday Clip-O-Rama" (director)
  - "Ask a Foolish Question" (director)
  - "Misperceived Monotreme" (director)
  - "Magic Carpet Ride" (director)
  - "Doof Dynasty" (director)
  - "Phineas and Ferb Interrupted" (director)
  - "Mommy Can You Hear Me?" (director)
  - "Skiddley Whiffers" (director)
  - "Tour de Ferb" (director)
  - "Bullseye!" (director)
  - "That's the Spirit!" (director)
  - "The Curse of Candace" (director)
  - "Escape from Phineas Tower" (director)
  - "Ferb Latin" (director)
  - "Losta Latkes" (director)
  - "Mom's in the House" (director)
  - "Monster from the Id" (director)
  - "Phineas and Ferb and the Temple of Juatchadoon" (director)
  - "Quietest Day Ever" (director)
  - "Bully Bromance Breakup" (director)
  - "The Doonkelberry Imperative" (director)
  - "Buford Confidential" (director)
  - "Sci-Fi Pie Fly" (director)
  - "Cranius Maximus" (director)
  - "Tri-State Treasure: Boot of Secrets" (director)
  - "Norm Unleashed" (director)
  - "Road to Danville" (director)
  - "Where's Perry? (Part 2)" (director)
  - "Blackout!" (director)
  - "This Is Your Backstory" (director)

== Bibliography ==
Month	Title	Issue	Story	Publisher	Notes
Jul. 2012	SpongeBob Comics	#9	"Hold Still!"	United Plankton Pictures	Story
May 2015	SpongeBob Comics	#44	"The Secret of the Giant Pink Fuzzy Dice"	United Plankton Pictures	Story
Jun. 2016	SpongeBob Comics	#57	"The Clarinet of Dr. Calamari"	United Plankton Pictures	Story
Jul. 2016	SpongeBob Comics	#58	"Larry the Lobster (and Patrick) in: Crusoem Twosome"	United Plankton Pictures	Story
Nov. 2016	SpongeBob Comics	#62	"Squidward's Mythological Madness"	United Plankton Pictures	Story
