= Clément Sauvé =

Canadian comics artist

Clément Sauvé was a comic book artist, animation and game designer for the American and French market.

He was born September 24, 1977, in Montreal, where he grew up, and died January 26, 2011. After some short studies in graphic design at Cégep du Vieux Montréal (Old Montreal College), Clement Sauve started his comic book career working as an assistant to Yanick Paquette for a period of three year on various comics like Gambit, Superman and Codename: Knockout. Years of sending submissions finally landed him his first solo job, Human Defense Corps for DC Comics. He later on worked on Stormwatch, did various covers, and worked on Infantry for Devil's Due's Aftermath line. Moving on to the French market, he did Black Bank for Soleil.

Clément died on 2011, shortly after being diagnosed with cancer. The G.I. Joe: Renegades episode "Brothers of Light" is dedicated to him.

He claimed his influences covered Yanick Paquette, Eric Canete, Dan Norton, Brandon Peterson, Mike Mignola, Kevin Nowlan, Jim Lee, Carlos D'anda, Jean Giraud and Masamune Shirow.
