= The Amazing Spider-Man 129 =

129th issue of The Amazing Spider-Man

The Amazing Spider-Man #129
- Cover of The Amazing Spider-Man #129 (February 1974) by Gil Kane and John Romita Sr.

Publication information
- Publisher: Marvel Comics
- Format: Single issue
- Genre: Superhero
- Publication date: February 1974
- Main character(s): Spider-Man; Jackal; Punisher

Creative team
- Created by: Gerry Conway; Ross Andru; John Romita Sr.
- Written by: Gerry Conway
- Artist(s): Ross Andru; Frank Giacoia; Dave Hunt
- Penciller: Ross Andru
- Inker(s): Frank Giacoia; Dave Hunt
- Letterer: John Costanza
- Colorist: Dave Hunt
- Editor: Roy Thomas

The Amazing Spider-Man #129, with its subtitle being "The Punisher Strikes Twice!" is a 19-page-long single issue of the American comic book The Amazing Spider-Man, published by Marvel Comics in 1974. The issue is well known for being the first appearance of the Punisher, who at that point in time was portrayed as an antagonist of Spider-Man but would later become one of Marvel's most popular and successful characters. The issue is also the first appearance of the Jackal, a supervillain who would go on to become one of Spider-Man's most notorious adversaries and an integral part of the infamous Clone Saga storyline in the mid-1990s.

The issue is considered a milestone comic by Marvel fans and is very sought after among comic book collectors. It was written by Gerry Conway and drawn by artist Ross Andru with a cover by Gil Kane and John Romita Sr. (Note: John Romita Sr. who was Marvel's art director at the time created the basic design for the character while The Amazing Spider-Man's penciller Ross Andru was the first artist to draw the character for publication. They are both generally credited as creators of the character.) which has been homaged, copied, and parodied multiple times.

== Publication history ==
In English the issue named "The Punisher Strikes Twice!" was released with the tagline "He's Different! He's Deadly! He's -- The Punisher! The Most Lethal Hired Assassin Ever! His Assignment: Kill Spider-Man! And Behind the Most Murderous Plot of All Times, There Lurks... The Jackal!".

In other countries the comic was first published in 1974 in Canada; in June 1974 in Brazil; September 24, 1974 in Mexico; 1975 in the Netherlands; January 14, 1976 in Italy; 1978 in Colombia; August 1978 in Greece; February 1979 in Germany; November 29, 1979 in Sweden; December 4, 1979 in Norway; December 1980 in Spain; June 3 1993 in Denmark; November 2006 in France. It was also published in Yugoslavia and Britain at some points.

== Story ==
The villainous figure the Jackal on the panel from The Amazing Spider-Man #146 (July 1975) also debuted in this comic, art by Ross Andru.

A new costumed character called the Jackal has appeared and hired a vigilante, the Punisher, to kill Spider-Man. Spider-Man, meanwhile, is web-slinging through the city contemplating the recent death of his girlfriend Gwen Stacy; he stops to take some pictures of a robbery and stop it along the way. He takes the photos to the Daily Bugle as Peter Parker, where J. Jonah Jameson has a fit that Parker has not been able to get any photos of the Punisher, and that all the competition is snapping up photos of him in action.

Peter leaves and changes back to Spider-Man, and soon finds himself attacked by the Punisher, who thinks that Spider-Man is a regular crook just like everyone else he kills. The vigilante does not have much of an upper hand against Spider-Man, and the Jackal (who was hiding near the battle) decides to attack him. When his claws rake the back of Spider-Man's head, the Punisher calls the Jackal on his "unjust" methods of killing Spider-Man. Spider-Man manages to get away when he stumbles off the edge of the building they are fighting on, gains control, and swings away. When the Jackal and Punisher depart, Spider-Man returns to the scene, collecting the Punisher's weapon that was left behind and seeing that it was made by a company named Reiss Armories.

As he returns to his apartment, now dressed as Peter Parker, he mends his costume, unaware that his friend Harry Osborn is listening and suspecting that Peter may know that he has decided to take up the mantle of the Green Goblin after his father. While at Empire State University, Miles Warren has sought out Mary Jane Watson to see if she can pass along an apology to Peter over their brief run-in while he was trying to get help for her when the Vulture had captured her. At the secret hideout of the Jackal, the Punisher lashes out at the Jackal over their methods of elimination. The Punisher leaves to go to the Mechanic, his gun supplier, to resupply.

This quest brings him to Reiss Armories, where he finds Spider-Man, who just stumbled upon the Mechanic's dead body. Believing that Spider-Man was the one who had killed the Mechanic, the Punisher attacks him. During their fight, Spider-Man manages to get the upper hand and bind the Punisher. He then makes the vigilante see that the Jackal's trademark clawings were the cause of the Mechanic's death. Realizing that the Jackal had been manipulating him to do his dirty work and then intended to frame him for murder, the Punisher vows to get revenge against the Jackal and storms out, leaving Spider-Man alone at the crime scene. When Spider-Man hears police sirens on their way there, he leaves as well. The Jackal, watching on, vows that he will eventually destroy Spider-Man.

== Reception ==
The magazine Complex ranked the cover by Kane and Romita as both the number 32nd-most iconic Spider-Man image ever and the fourth-best The Amazing Spider-Man cover of all time. Comic Book Resources named the cover to be the twelfth-greatest Spider-Man cover of all time in 2012 and again in 2017. The issue was voted by fans as the 50th-greatest Marvel Comics issue of all time in 2001 and therefore was included in the trade paperback 100 Greatest Marvels of All Time, and the 57th-greatest single Marvel comic book issue ever in 2017. Comic Book Resources ranked the story "The Punisher Strikes Twice" as the 32nd-greatest Punisher story of all time.

The Punisher's unusual behavior for a character in a superhero comic made his debut controversial, with very few characters being willing to kill at that time in the medium. Greg Turner of Back to the Past stated in his review that as far as an introduction goes, it was good for the Punisher and that it was no surprise that the character showed up soon again in issue #134, since he proved very popular. Todd Frye, the author of the book Marvelous Mythology, asserted that the Punisher was unusual even as a super-villain at the time, stating that the character's willingness to kill with conventional military weaponry, as opposed to using technological sci-fi gadgets which instead stunned the hero like most antagonists, was something new.

Kenny Coburn of ComicVerse expressed that from reading the issue one gets a good grip about the Punisher's philosophy on killing and his code of conduct which is bonded with a strict moral code, which according to Coburn clearly indicates that the character was meant to be sympathetic from the beginning, in contrast to most of Spider-Man's villains who were introduced at the time. Coburn also expressed that it was easy to see how the Punisher stood out against other characters of the time, starting: "[after realizing that he's been manipulated by the Jackal] The Punisher punches a wall and walks away, mumbling about how he is fighting a lonely war. It's this type of dark brooding that makes it easy to see why the Punisher didn't fit in after his initial debut, especially juxtaposed against Spider-Man's bright colors and constant quips." In difference from Coburn, Mark Ginocchio, the author of 100 Things Spider-Man Fans Should Know & Do Before They Die believes that the Punisher's success as a character was mostly an accident and that the main focus of the story and the character that was introduced and meant to be a major player for the Marvel Universe was the Jackal.

== Legacy ==
The character of the Punisher was well received at the time and his characterization has stayed largely consistent since his introduction in this issue. None of the character's backstory is given in the issue besides him being a Marine veteran and his core personality would be more refined by later authors. The character, whose real name was later revealed to be Frank Castle, would return to the comic only a few issues later in Amazing Spider-Man #134–135; after that, he received some solo one-shots before gaining his own limited series and later three ongoing series in the '80s and '90s. During that time, the Punisher was one of Marvel Comics' most profitable and well-known characters and remains integral to the company in recent years, with his skull insignia being an iconic symbol. As a breakout character for Marvel, the character helped launch the enduring popularity of anti-heroes in superhero comics. According to Jason Serafino of Complex magazine, despite the character's many incarnations and interpretations as everything between a lone vigilante, a spandex-wearing superhero and a supernatural guardian angel, the character always eventually retreats back to his grim and violent origins, which were portrayed in this first comic.

The events of the comic are mirrored in Ultimate Spider-Man #157, in which Spider-Man ends up taking a bullet to save the life of Captain America from an assassination attempt by the Punisher, which was described by Andy Khouri of ComicsAlliance as a clever call-back and a fairly poetic way for Spider-Man to die in the Ultimate Marvel continuity.

== Homages ==
Above image from Punisher (2009), art by Mike McKone.
Bottom image from No Hero #1, art by Juan José Ryp.

The cover of this issue has been paid homage to several times:

- In 1994, the crossover Archie Meets the Punisher featured a cover similar to The Amazing Spider-Man #129 for the "Direct Market Edition " with Archie Andrews in the Punisher's crosshairs.
- The cover to What If? #58 (February 1994) named "What if the Punisher had killed Spider-Man?" is a direct reference to the cover and the issue proposes what would have happened if the Punisher had succeeded in killing Spider-Man before realizing that he was not a bad guy.
- The Amazing Spider-Girl #4 named "Whatever Happened to the Daughter of Spider-Man, Part Four: Caught in Mad Dog's Crosshairs!" from 2007 pays homage to the cover with art by Ron Frenz.
- The cover to Ultimate Avengers vs. New Ultimates #3 (June 2011) is a tribute to the cover and mimics its basic composition.
- The cover was also paid tribute to by Chris Giarrusso in his Mini Marvels comic book.
- Punisher (2009) #1 features an Amazing Spider-Man #129 cover homage with Norman Osborn taking the place of Spider-Man.
- A variant cover to Spider-Woman #2 features an image to the cover with Rocket Raccoon in the place of the Punisher and Groot in the place of Spider-Man.
- The series No Hero by Warren Ellis features an homage to the cover on issue #1.
- The cover to the DVD release of the professional wrestling show King of Trios 2 made by Chikara is a tribute to the cover.
- In 2014, the cover to the fourth issue of the comic book series Bad Ass is based on the cover.
- A variant cover drawn by Daniel Acuna to the first issue of the 2014 Star Wars series has Boba Fett as the Punisher and Han Solo as Spider-Man.
- In 2017, Marvel produced a variant cover with Mary Jane Watson in the place of the Punisher and the demon Mephisto in the place of Spider-Man, as a reference to the storyline "One More Day".
- In 2017, as part of Marvel's event comic "Legacy", the cover to Deadpool by Salvador Espin is an homage to the cover.
- In 2024, the variant cover by Dave Johnson of Get Fury #1 is an homage, featuring a Vietnam-era Punisher and Nick Fury in place of Spider-Man.

== Collectibility ==
An original copy of the issue can be sold for unusually high prices depending on its CGC score. Several 9.4 copies have been sold on WorthPoint for nearly $900 each. The record sale of a copy on the popular website sellmycomicbooks.com was for $5,000 (over a $1,000 more than the second-most valuable issue; #121 the Death of Gwen Stacy) and it has an absolute minimum value of $100 in bad condition on the site. The website also estimated that a 6.0-graded copy is worth between $250 and $275 and that it is major comic book Bronze Age key issue and a must have for any Spider-Man collector. Other sites have estimated the value of a 6.0 point guard issue to be around $345. It is one of the few comic books of the Bronze Age which is highly valuable and its price and demand has only increased as time has gone on. Due to the increasing popularity of the character the Punisher since his introduction the issues value has increased significantly in the late 2010s after having been undervalued for a long time. The price rose significantly from its low point in 2011 to 2016. In 2016 a 9.8-graded copy was auctioned off for $8,855. Two other 9.8-graded copies went for over $10,000 in 2016, with one of them going for $10,600 in March. The comic is one of the most rare ever made and ranked no. 6 on CoverBrowser's top 10 list. The issue is also commonly considered an easy choice for sellers all over to have graded because of its status as being considered an obvious classic among fans and collectors of comic books. InvestComics rates the issue as one of the most sought-after issues of The Amazing Spider-Man ever and ComicBookInvest ranks it as the most valuable Punisher comic ever. In 2015 David Tosh, author of Picker's Pocket Guide Comic Books: How to Pick Antiques Like a Pro estimated that higher-grade copies could go for almost $15,000. In 2017 Verdict estimated that it was the ninth-most valuable comic to come out of the Bronze Age, with a minimum price of $100 for an original printing. Sales of the issue increased in the late 2010s due to the popularity of the Punisher incarnation depicted in the Marvel Cinematic Universe.

== Reprints ==
- The comic was first reprinted in Marvel Tales #106 in 1979.
- In 2004, Lionsgate Entertainment and Marvel Enterprises celebrated the premiere of the new Punisher film with a special giveaway reprint of the issue. Participating theatres gave away one comic book with one paid admission to The Punisher, while supplies lasted. The Lionsgate special edition marked the first time the book had been reprinted in a new format. The issue was later also included in The Punisher: Official Movie Adaptation comic.
- The issue and the following six issues, as well as Marvel Team-Up #22 and Giant-Size Spider-Man #1, were reprinted in 2010 as part of the Marvel Pocket Books series in a paperback volume named The Amazing Spider-Man: The Punisher Strikes Twice.
- The issue was republished in 2002 with a remade cover as part of the Wizard Ace series.

== In other media ==
- Elements from this issue have been adapted into the Spider-Man: The Animated Series episode, "The Return of the Green Goblin".
- The cover of this issue is one of the 32 that appear in the comic collection from the 2000 video game Spider-Man.
- The issue is referenced in the 2005 video game The Punisher on a car which has the licence plate ASM129.
- The title The Punisher Strikes Twice! is used in the video game Lego Marvel Super Heroes: Universe in Peril.

== In popular culture ==
The comic and its large monetary value is discussed and is a plot point in the film Coyote Ugly, wherein a male character is enthusiastically speaking to a female acquaintance about how much money the issue is worth, describing it as "the Holy Grail of comics". The scene is often mistakenly attributed to Kevin Smith, who did an uncredited rewrite of the script.

== See also ==
- List of The Amazing Spider-Man issues
