= Shrapnel (comics) =

Shrapnel, in comics, may refer to:

- Shrapnel (DC Comics), a DC Comics supervillain
- Shrapnel (Radical Comics), a series of science fiction limited series from Radical Comics
- Shrapnel (Transformers), a character in Transformers who has appeared in the comic book adaptations

== See also ==
- Shrapnel (disambiguation)
