= Jim Demonakos =

American graphic novelist, director and musician (born 1977)

- Born: James Demonakos; 1977 (age 48–49)
- Occupations: Film director; graphic novelist; writer; event coordinator
- Notable work: The Silence Of Our Friends, Emerald City Comic Con, Mike Mignola: Drawing Monsters

Jim Demonakos (born 1977) is an American director, graphic novelist, and event organizer noted for his work in comic books, conventions, and documentary films. He is the founder of the Emerald City Comic Con and LightBox Expo, as well as the director and producer of the award-winning documentary film, Mike Mignola: Drawing Monsters.

== Early life ==
The child of Greek immigrants, Demonakos was born in Montana and moved to Seattle, WA when he was six years old. He grew up in the food service world, working from his early teens in his parents' restaurants. After graduating high school, he enrolled at The University of Washington, and then transferred to The Art Institute of Seattle, where he graduated with a degree in computer animation.

== Career ==
Jim opened his first comic book store, The Comic Stop, in March 2000, followed by a second store in 2002. Eventually the stores expanded to a total of four locations, making The Comic Stop the largest chain of comic book shops in the Pacific Northwest. He also served as PR & Marketing Coordinator for Image Comics from 2005 to 2006.

He founded Seattle's Emerald City Comic Con (ECCC) as a one-day event in 2003, with an attendance of 3,000 people. He then spent over a decade growing and developing ECCC into the largest independent comic convention in the United States. Emerald City Comic Con was acquired by ReedPOP (RELX) in 2015 and Demonakos ceased being involved in the event as of 2017.

Alongside Mark Long, he wrote the New York Times Best Selling graphic novel, The Silence of Our Friends, which was illustrated by National Book Award winner Nate Powell. The graphic novel was awarded a Great Graphic Novel for Teens by YALSA.

Jim is a founding member of the pioneering nerd rock band Kirby Krackle, where he was the songwriter and lyricist from the bands start in 2009 until 2014, when he left the band.

He launched a successful Kickstarter campaign to bring back The Classic Comic Book Spinner Rack, including creating a variant which was specially designed to hold Certified Guaranty Company (CGC) graded comic books, which he manufactured and distributed from 2018 to 2021.

Demonakos co-founded LightBox Expo which debuted in 2019 and has already become a must-attend event among animation, illustration and concept art creators and fans.

Most recently, he produced and directed (alongside Kevin Konrad Hanna) Mike Mignola: Drawing Monsters, an award-winning feature-length documentary about Mike Mignola and the creation of his comic book universe centered around Hellboy.

== Filmography ==
- Mike Mignola: Drawing Monsters (2022) – director/producer

== Bibliography ==
- The Silence of Our Friends (art by Nate Powell, written by Mark Long and Jim Demonakos. 1/12, First Second Books - ISBN 978-1250164988)
- The Complete Tales From The Con (created and edited by Jim Demonakos, art by Chris Giarrusso, written by Brad Guigar. 8/18, Image Comics - ISBN 978-1534302907)
- The Lion and the Aardvark: Aesop's Modern Fables (edited by Robin D. Laws, short story written by Jim Demonakos. 8/13, Stone Skin Press - ISBN 978-1908983022)
- Skullkickers #12 backup story (art by Joel Carroll, written by Jim Demonakos, Kyle Stevens. 11/11, Image Comics)
- Savage Dragon #129 backup story (art by Joe Largent, written by Jim Demonakos. 10/06, Image Comics)
- Shrapnel: Aristeia Rising and Shrapnel: Hubris (edited by Jim Demonakos. 01/09, Radical Comics)

== Awards ==
- 2022: FilmQuest Film Festival: Best Documentary for Mike Mignola: Drawing Monsters
- 2022: Gen Con Film Festival: Best Documentary for Mike Mignola: Drawing Monsters
- 2022: Chagrin Documentary Film Festival: Best Documentary for Mike Mignola: Drawing Monsters
- 2022: Fantasmagoria: Best Documentary for Mike Mignola: Drawing Monsters
- 2022: Prague Independent Film Festival: Best Documentary for Mike Mignola: Drawing Monsters
- 2022: Hamilton Film Festival: Best Documentary for Mike Mignola: Drawing Monsters
- 2022: Shockfest Film Festival: Best Documentary for Mike Mignola: Drawing Monsters
- 2022: Oniros Film Awards: Best Documentary for Mike Mignola: Drawing Monsters
- 2022: Fantasmagoría - Festival de Cine Fantástico y de Terror de Medellìn: Best Documentary for Mike Mignola: Drawing Monsters
