= Clone (comic) =

- Clone Volume 1 (2013). Cover art by Juan Jose Ryp

Publication information
- Publisher: Image Comics/Skybound
- Schedule: Monthly
- Publication date: November 2012 – 2014
- No. of issues: 20

Creative team
- Created by: David Schulner
- Written by: David Schulner, Aaron Ginsburg, Wade McIntyre
- Artist: Juan Jose Ryp
- Letterer: Rus Wooton
- Colorist: Felix Serrano
- Editor: Sean Mackiewicz

Collected editions
- First Generation: ISBN 1-60706-683-1
- Second Generation: ISBN 1-60706-830-3
- Third Generation: ISBN 1-60706-939-3
- Fourth Generation: ISBN 1-63215-036-0

Clone is a comic book series published by Skybound Entertainment and Image Comics on November 12, 2012. It ran for 20 issues, ending in 2014. The series was created by David Schulner and written by Schulner, Aaron Ginsburg, and Wade McIntyre with art by Juan Jose Ryp and Felix Serrano.

The comic tells the story of Dr. Luke Taylor, whose perfect life comes to a dramatic halt when an identical, bloodied version of himself arrives at his doorstep with news that he is one of many clones, and they’re all after his pregnant wife and their unborn child.

The story presented in Clone explores themes surrounding individuality and survival. Included in these theme are those of the individual vs. society and life and death. Through serious tones of anxiety and the need for preservation, the story points to the notion that one’s greatest ally is him/herself.

Due to poor sales and decisions from both NBC and Syfy not to produce television shows based on the book, Clone ended with a cliffhanger on the 20th issue.

== Plot ==
Dr. Luke Taylor’s life is interrupted when, one day, he finds a mysterious trail of blood leading to his kitchen. Luke discovers an identical, bloodied version of himself on the floor, who reveals that he is one of many clones, and that there are more on the way that are after his pregnant wife! Luke Taylor must save his wife and unborn daughter from the grasps of the other clones, fighting to survive against the many different versions of himself, all while trying to uncover the truth behind the Clone program he somehow found himself to be a part of.

== Collected Editions ==
- Volume 1 (collects Clone #1-5, May 2013, ISBN 1-60706-683-1)
- Volume 2: Second Generation (collects Clone #6-10, November 2013, ISBN 1-60706-830-3)
- Volume 3: Third Generation (collects Clone #11-15, April 2014, ISBN 1-60706-939-3)
- Volume 4: Fourth Generation (collects Clone #16-20, October 2014, ISBN 1-63215-036-0)
