= Boom Boom Kid (band) =

Argentine hardcore band

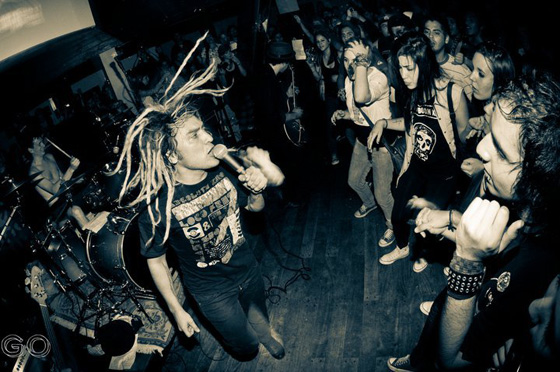
- Boom Boom Kid in 2013

Background information
- Origin: Buenos Aires, Argentina
- Genres: Hardcore punk, melodic hardcore, punk rock, pop punk, alternative rock
- Years active: 2001 - present
- Label: Ugly Records
- Members: Carlos Rodríguez (voice and guitar); Javier Marta (guitar); Dario "Pelado" Lopez (bass); Marcelo "Chelo" Vidal (drums)

Boom Boom Kid (BBK) is a hardcore band from Argentina. This band has influences of rockabilly, psychobilly and salsa. The group was formed in 2001 by musician Carlos Rodríguez; after the separation of Fun People. The name is also the stage name of Rodriguez.

== Biography ==
This solo project started with the last Fun People album Angustia, no, no (2000) where the BBK single "Hold me/I Do" was attached. Subsequently, the debut LP Okey Dokey (2001) and multiple maxi singles and B-sides filled with oddities appeared, continuing a constant in the singer's career - a continuous and multi-format editing of his work in the case of BBK is entirely edited (in Argentina) by their label Ugly Records, created by Carlos himself.

Subsequently BBK released their second LP Smiles from Chapanoland (2004) and an album that compiled some singles and B-sides entitled The many, many moods of Boom Boom Kid (2005).

In 2009, they released their latest production entitled Frisbee. As of today, the band have released live material, EPs, compilations, books and seven-inch singles, etc.

== Discography ==
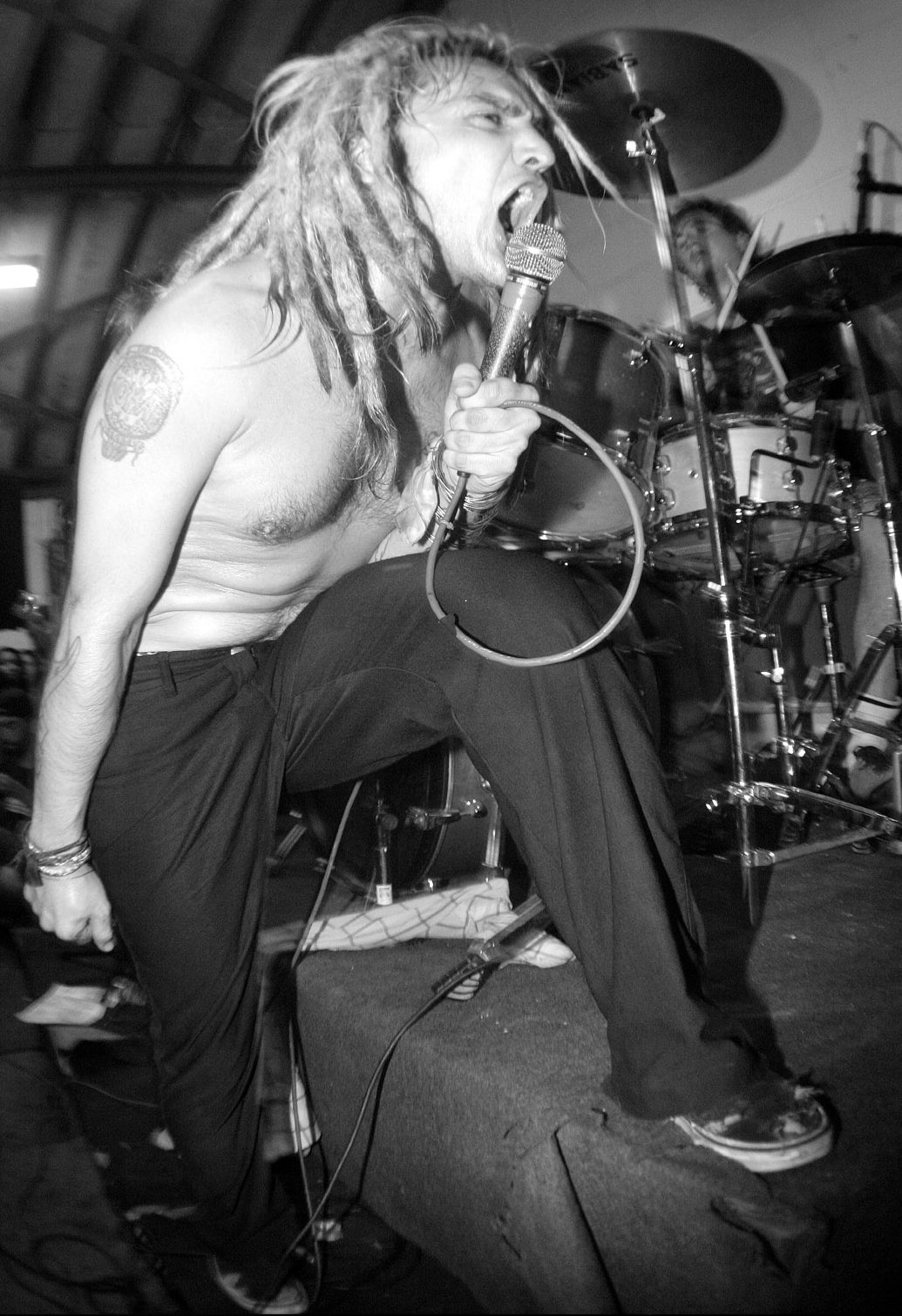
Carlos Rodriguez in 2007.

=== Studio albums ===
- Okey Dokey (2001)
- Smiles from Chapanoland (2004)
- Espontáneos Minutos De 2x2 Es 16 Odas Al Dada Tunes (2007)
- Frisbee (2009)
- El disco del otoño (2017)
- El disco del invierno (2017)
- El disco de la primavera (2017)
- El disco del verano (2018)

=== Compilations ===
- The Many Many Moods Of Boom Boom Kid (2005)
- Colección Verano 2010 (2010)
- Gatiho Preto Maulla 33 Faixas De Pelo Largo (2010)
- Grandfather's Poncho (2010, compilado japonés)
- Muy Frisbee (2011, compilado de outtakes de Frisbee)
- Libro absurdo (2012)
- Demasiado en fiestas, sin timón y con el mono al hombro

=== Singles (maxisimples/EP) ===
- Abrazame/I Do (2001)
- Razones/Kitty / Du Du (2001)
- Jenny/Feliz (2001)
- Can You Hear Me? (2001)
- I Don't Mind (2002)
- Hard - Ons/Boom Boom Kid (Slipt, 2002)
- She Runaway (2004)
- Boom Boom Kid/El Pus (Split 5", 2005)
- Con Amor Para Ricardo Valenzuela (7", 2006)
- Wasabi (2007)
- Sin Sanata Y Con El Tupé De No Callar (Single, 2008)
- Benjui Jamboree (EP, 2009)
- BBkid Y Su Guitarra (2012)

== See also ==
- Argentine punk
