= Mike Mignola: Drawing Monsters =

- Directed by: Kevin Konrad Hanna; Jim Demonakos
- Starring: Mike Mignola; Guillermo del Toro; Patton Oswalt; Rebecca Sugar
- Release dates: June 27, 2022 (Chattanooga Film Festival); September 17, 2024
- Country: United States
- Language: English

Mike Mignola: Drawing Monsters is a documentary film directed by Kevin Konrad Hanna and Jim Demonakos, focusing on the life and career of comic book artist and writer Mike Mignola, best known for creating the comic book series Hellboy. The documentary examines Mignola's unique art style, his influences, and the development of his career from a comic book artist to a creator of a vast supernatural storytelling empire.

== Synopsis ==
The documentary delves into the life of Mike Mignola, exploring his early years, artistic influences, and the steps that led to the creation of his most famous work, Hellboy. It features interviews with various figures in the comic book and entertainment industry, including artists, writers, and filmmakers who have been influenced by Mignola's work. Notably, the film includes insights from Guillermo del Toro, Patton Oswalt, and Rebecca Sugar, discussing Mignola's impact on their work and the broader entertainment industry.

== Release ==
Mike Mignola: Drawing Monsters had its film festival premiere at Fantastic Fest.

The documentary debuted on TVOD streaming services on September 17, 2024. It reached #1 on the Apple Documentary charts in the US and the UK.

== Reception ==
Matthew Jackson, reviewing the film for SyFy Wire, said, "Drawing Monsters is a portrait of a man who built the world he wanted to live in through no small amount of adversity and will leave you with a fresh appreciation of Mignola's work." Richard Whittaker, reviewing the film for The Austin Chronicle, described it as "a rich, detailed portrait of a creative genius," highlighting the documentary's depth and the quality of interviews.

== Awards ==
Mike Mignola: Drawing Monsters has received several awards and accolades, including:

- 2022: FilmQuest Film Festival: Best Documentary for "Mike Mignola: Drawing Monsters"
- 2022: Gen Con Film Festival: Best Documentary for "Mike Mignola: Drawing Monsters"
- 2022: Chagrin Documentary Film Festival: Best Documentary for "Mike Mignola: Drawing Monsters"
- 2022: Fantasmagoria: Best Documentary for "Mike Mignola: Drawing Monsters"
- 2022: Prague Independent Film Festival: Best Documentary for "Mike Mignola: Drawing Monsters"
