= Black Summer (disambiguation) =

Black Summer was a 2007–2008 comic book series.

Black Summer may also refer to:

- "Black Summer" (song), by Red Hot Chili Peppers, 2022
- Black Summer (TV series), a 2019 American streaming TV series
- 2019–20 Australian bushfire season, or "Black summer"
