= Solara =

Solara may refer to:

- "Solara" (song), 2018 single by the Smashing Pumpkins
- Solara, an original character from the comic book series Marvel Nemesis: Rise of the Imperfects
- Solara, limited edition models of the Mitsubishi Magna
- Talbot Solara, a saloon version of the Simca 1307 automobile
- Toyota Camry Solara, a mid-size coupe/convertible
- Solara (album)
