= Buenos Aires Hardcore =

Buenos Aires Hardcore was the name of the scene that gathered the Hardcore bands that started to play in Buenos Aires in the late 1980s.

The style of these bands was often influenced by the New York hardcore scene; often mixing styles like punk, metal and hip hop, however some bands like Fun People and No Demuestra Interés (N.D.I) were offering a style was far from the violent New York Hardcore style.

Bands that were part of the early Buenos Aires Hardcore scene included:

- No Demuestra Interés (N.D.I)
- Existencia de Odio (E.D.O.)
- Diferentes Actitudes Juveniles (D.A.J.)
- Buscando Otra Diversión (B.O.D.)
- Minoría Activa
- Acción Reacción
- Actitud de Cambio
- Alternativa Positiva
- Anesthesia (Fun People)
- Apocalipsis X (1999)
- Asphix
- Autocontrol
- Bhakti (Krsna Core)
- Buenas Intenciones
- Capilla Negra
- Confort Supremo
- Cosas Claras
- Culturas Perdidas
- Defensa y Justicia (Attaque 77)
- Despertar
- Despojados
- División Autista
- Dos Minutos de Advertencia (2 Minutos)
- Eco Violento (1997)
- Enferma Sociedad
- Enquirer (Madhava)
- Eterna Fuerza Natural
- Eterna Inocencia
- Eternidad
- Expresa tu emoción (ex Sakeo)
- Flores del Sol
- Flores Silvestres (2000)
- Fuerza Interna
- Fuerza y Decisión
- Fun People (Anesthesia)
- Funeral Funny (provincia de Córdoba)
- Furia Social Marginada (F.S.M.)
- Humo Likido
- Ideas Totalmente Adolescentes (I.T.A.)
- Indiferencia
- In Fire
- Inminente Destrucción Social (I.D.S)
- Juventud Unida Positiva (J.U.P.)
- Los de Afuera (L.D.A.)
- Massacre Palestina (Massacre (Argentine band))
- Natural
- Nueva Ética
- Nunca Digas Nunca (N.D.N.)
- Opción Crucial
- Otra Opción
- Otra Salida
- Pensar o Morir (de La Plata)
- Propia Decisión (1997)
- Psicotracción
- Raiz (1998)
- Reconcile (1998)
- Redención
- Restos Fósiles
- Suburbia (Sadistikal)
- 720º
- Siempre Verdadero (Los Verdaderos)
- Sudarshana(1997)
- Viciados (Charlie Brown / Charlie 3)
- Victimas
- Vieja Escuela (1996)
- Will Champion
- X el Cambio (1998)
- Yoda (1999)

Other important and late bands include 90Raíces, Eterno Enemigo, Scarponi, Dar Sangre, Será Pánico, Contra Todo, Ingobernables.
