= Charlie Huston =

American novelist

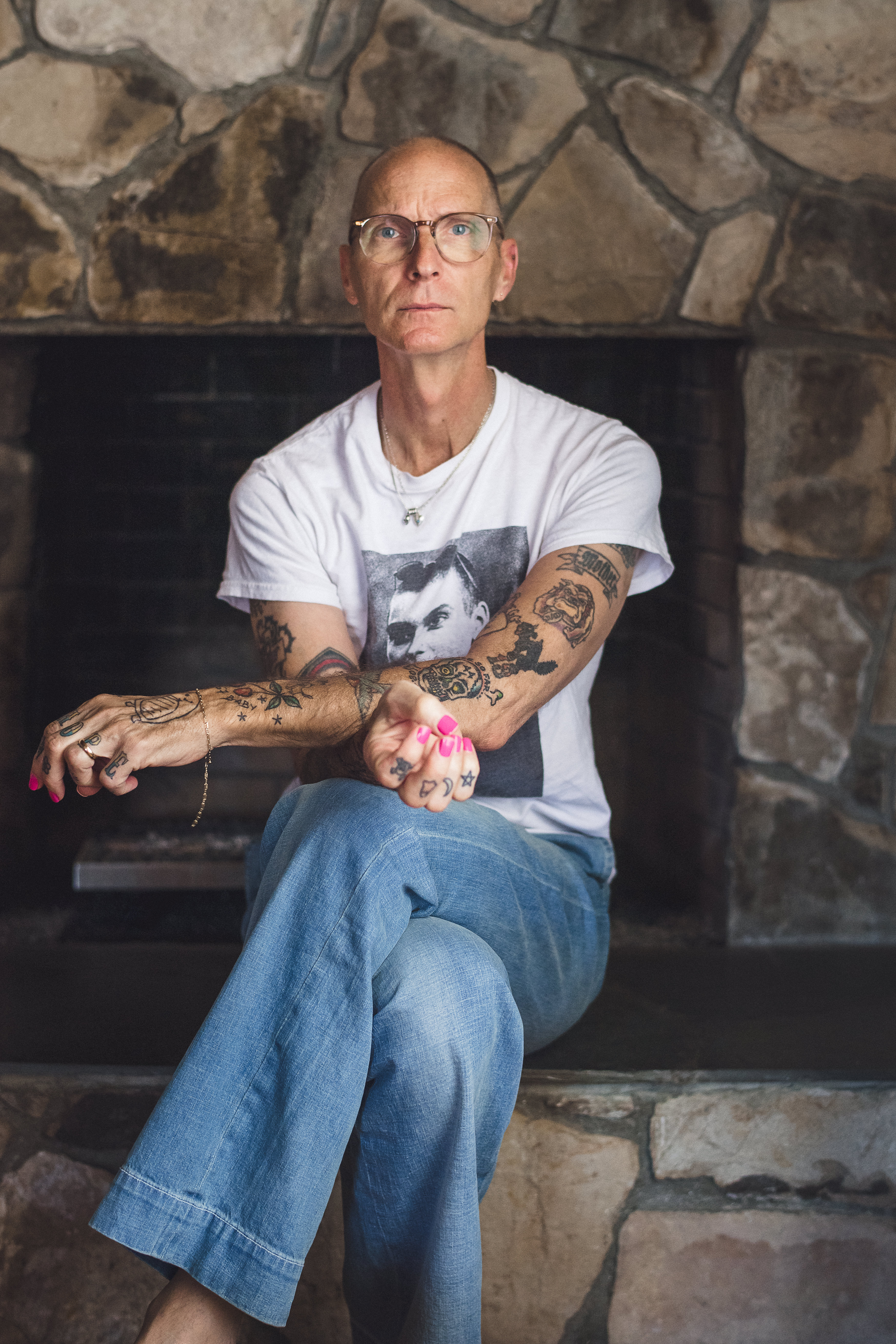
- Huston in July 2025
- Born: 1968 (age 57–58); Oakland, California, U.S.
- Occupations: Novelist; Comic book writer; Screenwriter
- Spouse: Virginia Louise Smith
- Writing career
- Period: 2004–present
- Website: www.charliehustonwrites.com

Charlie Huston (born 1968) is an American novelist, screenwriter and comic book writer. They (Note: Huston uses they/them pronouns) have written various novels in different genres, including Caught Stealing (2004) that was adapted into a 2025 film by Darren Aronofsky. They have also written the Joe Pitt Casebooks series that feature a detective who is also a vampire, as well as several standalone novels and comic books.

== Personal background ==
Huston was born in Oakland, California, in 1968. When they were two years old, the family moved to Livermore, California, where Huston grew up. When they were 19 years old, they attended San Francisco State University. They then transferred to California State University, Chico and earned a degree in Communications Studies in 1991. They married Virginia Louise Smith, and the couple resides in Los Angeles.

== Career ==
Caught Stealing, along with Six Bad Things and Huston's fourth novel, A Dangerous Man, follow the lovable anti-hero, baseball-mad Henry Thompson, as he struggles to escape a deadly case of mistaken identity, his past, and build a new life for himself.

In April 2006, Marvel Comics launched Huston's reboot of the Marvel character Moon Knight. They wrote the first 12 issues of the series, concluding the run in December 2007. They also wrote the second Ultimates Annual issue in August 2006. Another long-form comics work was a Wolverine series, Wolverine: The Best There Is, with artist Juan José Ryp.

They wrote the five-volume contemporary vampire noir Joe Pitt Casebooks primarily while living in Manhattan, finishing the final book in the series after moving to California. Their five stand-alone novels are The Shotgun Rule, The Mystic Arts of Erasing All Signs of Death, Sleepless, Skinner and Catchpenny.

In January 2013, it was announced that Huston was working on the pilot for FX's adaption of the Powers comic series. Between 2017 and 2019, they were a writer and producer on the Fox TV series Gotham.

As of September 2022, they were developing and writing an original TV pilot titled Arcadia for Tomorrow Studios. This project is currently being packaged for further development.

In March 2024 it was announced that Huston was adapting Caught Stealing for a movie to be directed by Darren Aronofsky and starring Austin Butler. The film was released on August 29, 2025.

== Bibliography ==
=== Henry Thompson ===
- Caught Stealing (hc, 256 pages, Ballantine Books, 2004, ISBN 0-345-46477-X; sc, 288 pages, 2005, ISBN 0-345-46478-8)
- Six Bad Things (sc, 305 pages, Ballantine Books, 2005, ISBN 0-345-46479-6)
- A Dangerous Man (sc, 286 pages, Ballantine Books, 2006, ISBN 0-345-48133-X)

=== Joe Pitt Casebooks ===
- Already Dead (sc, 288 pages, Del Rey Books, 2005, ISBN 0-345-47824-X)
- No Dominion (sc, 272 pages, Del Rey Books, 2006, ISBN 0-345-47825-8)
- Half the Blood of Brooklyn (sc, 223 pages, Del Rey Books, 2007, ISBN 0-345-49587-X)
- Every Last Drop (sc, 252 pages, Del Rey Books, 2008, ISBN 0-345-49588-8)
- My Dead Body (sc, 315 pages, Del Rey Books, 2009, ISBN 0-345-49589-6)

=== Standalone novels ===
- The Shotgun Rule (hc, 256 pages, Ballantine Books, 2007, ISBN 0-345-48135-6; sc, 272 pages, 2009, ISBN 0-345-48136-4)
- The Mystic Arts of Erasing All Signs of Death (hc, 336 pages, Ballantine Books, 2009, ISBN 0-345-50111-X; sc, 352 pages, 2009, ISBN 0-345-50112-8)
- Sleepless (hc, 368 pages, Ballantine Books, 2010, ISBN 0-345-50113-6; sc, 368 pages, 2010, ISBN 0-345-50114-4)
- Skinner (hc, 400 pages, Mulholland Books, 2013, ISBN 0-316-13372-8; sc, 400 pages, 2014, ISBN 0-316-13370-1)
- Catchpenny (sc, 416 pages, Vintage, 2024, ISBN 0-593-68508-3)

=== Comics ===
To date, the entirety of Huston's work in comics has been published by Marvel and its various imprints:

- Moon Knight vol. 2 (with David Finch, Mico Suayan, Tomm Coker (#13), Javier Saltares and Mark Texeira; issues #14–19 are scripted by Mike Benson from Huston's plots, 2006–2008) collected as:
  - The Bottom (collects #1–6, hc, 152 pages, 2007, ISBN 0-7851-2542-6; tpb, 2007, ISBN 0-7851-1907-8)
  - Midnight Sun (collects #7–13, hc, 224 pages, 2008, ISBN 0-7851-2289-3; tpb, 2008, ISBN 0-7851-2290-7)
  - God and Country (collects #14–19, hc, 184 pages, 2008, ISBN 0-7851-2892-1; tpb, 2008, ISBN 0-7851-2521-3)
  - Moon Knight by Huston, Benson and Hurwitz Omnibus (includes #1–19, hc, 1,184 pages, 2022, ISBN 1-302-93456-2)
- The Ultimates 2 Annual #2 (with Mike Deodato, Jr. and Ryan Sook, Ultimate Marvel, 2006) collected in Ultimate Annuals Volume 2 (tpb, 160 pages, 2006, ISBN 0-7851-2371-7)
- Legion of Monsters: Man-Thing: "A Flower in Alien Soil" (with Klaus Janson, one-shot, 2007) collected in Legion of Monsters (hc, 280 pages, 2007, ISBN 0-7851-2754-2)
- X-Force Special: Ain't No Dog (with Jefte Palo, one-shot, 2008) collected in X-Force by Craig Kyle and Chris Yost Volume 1 (tpb, 384 pages, 2014, ISBN 0-7851-8966-1)
- Deadpool vol. 2 #900: "One Down" (with Kyle Baker, co-feature, 2009) collected in Deadpool: Dead Head Redemption (tpb, 240 pages, 2011, ISBN 0-7851-5649-6)
- Shang-Chi, Master of Kung Fu: Black and White: "The Vaccuum [sic] of Memory" (with Enrique Badía Romero, anthology one-shot, 2009)
- Punisher (Marvel MAX):
  - The Punisher: Frank Castle #75: "Smallest Bit of This" (with Ken Lashley, co-feature, 2009) collected in Punisher MAX: The Complete Collection Volume 5 (tpb, 504 pages, 2017, ISBN 1-302-90274-1)
  - Punisher MAX: Hot Rods of Death: "Getting Mad" (with Shawn Martinbrough, one-shot, 2010) collected in Punisher MAX: The Complete Collection Volume 6 (tpb, 376 pages, 2017, ISBN 1-302-90739-5)
- Deathlok vol. 3 #1–7 (with Lan Medina, Marvel Knights, 2010) collected as Deathlok: The Demolisher (hc, 176 pages, 2010, ISBN 0-7851-4365-3; tpb, 2011, ISBN 0-7851-2828-X)
- Bullseye: Perfect Game #1–2 (with Shawn Martinbrough, Marvel Knights, 2011) collected in Punisher and Bullseye: Deadliest Hits (tpb, 120 pages, 2017, ISBN 1-302-90578-3)
- Wolverine: The Best There Is #1–12 (with Juan José Ryp, 2011–2012) collected as Wolverine: The Best There Is—The Complete Series (tpb, 288 pages, 2013, ISBN 0-7851-6766-8)

== Notes ==
Preceded by Doug Moench	Moon Knight writer 2006–2008	Succeeded by Mike Benson
Preceded by Joe Casey	Deathlok writer 2010	Succeeded by Nathan Edmondson
