= Carlos Rodríguez (musician) =

Argentine musician and artist (born 1972)

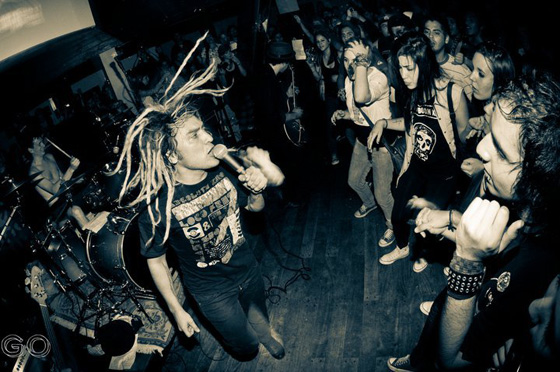
- Carlos Rodríguez in 2013.

Background information
- Also known as: Nekro, Il Carlo, BBK, Boom Boom Kid, Voom Vaan Kinder, El Principito hardcore
- Born: Carlos Damián Rodríguez; 13 January 1972 (age 54); Campana, Argentina
- Occupations: Musician, songwriter, producer, artist
- Instruments: Vocals, guitar, keyboard
- Years active: 1989–present
- Label: Ugly Records
- Website: www.boomboomkid.info

Carlos Damián Rodríguez (born 13 January 1972) is an Argentine musician, artist and songwriter, famous as part of the hardcore punk band Fun People and who is currently in the band Boom Boom Kid. Also known by various aliases as: Nekro, Boom Boom Kid, and Il Carlo. He has released several CDs, DVDs, records and books.

== Biography ==
Born in Campana, Argentina, he has been a vegetarian since the age 17. His first concert was on 26 July 1989. In 1995, he released the record Anestesia and went on tour with the band Fun People, made up by Carlos Rodríguez (vocals), Lucas Elizald Sequeira (guitar), Dario López (bass), Marcelo Vidal (drums). His works are translated into Spanish and English, and in many cases both interchangeably. He also performs acoustic solo shows playing the guitar.

Highlights of his covers of other artists are: "Stay Free" from The Clash and the song "Principe Azul" (Blue Prince) from Uruguayan Eduardo Mateo.

On his arm he has a tattoo of the Saint Exupery character The Little Prince.

He has released his records in Latin América, Europe, Japan and USA, among others. In his shows, tours, and liner notes to these records, he conducts himself with a do it yourself ideology.

He appears in many of his videos. In the song "Brick by Brick" holding a sign with the legend: "Fuck art! let's rock", or singing in "I do" which was retransmitted by the MTV and the song "I don't mind" transmitted by MuchMusic.

== Discography ==
- 1995, Fun People, Anesthesia
- 1996, Fun People, Kum Kum
- 1997, Fun People, Todo niño sensible sabrá de qué estamos hablando
- 1998, Fun People, The Fun People Experience
- 1999, Fun People, The Art(e) of Romance.
- 1999, Fun People, Gori & Nekro – Golden hits
- 2000, Fun People, Angustia no, no
- 2001, Boom Boom Kid, Okey Dokey
- 2004, Boom Boom Kid, Smiles from Chapanoland
- 2006, Boom Boom Kid, The many many moods of Boom Boom Kid.
- 2007, Boom Boom Kid, Wasabi
- 2007, Boom Boom Kid, Espontáneos Momentos De 2x2 Es 16 Odas Al Dada Tunes
- 2009, Boom Boom Kid, Frisbee
- 2010, Boom Boom Kid, Colección verano 2010
- 2011, Boom Boom Kid, Muy Frisbee
- 2012, Boom Boom Kid, Libro absurdo

On 8 October 2011, he was invited to play with the band Bad Religion.

== Collaborations ==
In 2020 collaborated as a vocalist in the song "I'm Nothing" by Argentine/Australian musician Damián Gaume together with bassist Chris Chaney.

In 2014 was featured as a vocalist in the song "Si, es verdad" by Poncho.

In 2020 he sang a cover of SNFU's "The Gravedigger" as the LoveSong of the Month series.
