= Emerald City Comic Con =

Comic book convention in Washington State, USA

Coordinates: 47°36′43″N 122°19′53″W

Emerald City Comic Con (ECCC)
- Status: Active
- Genre: Comic
- Venue: Seattle Convention Center
- Location: Seattle, Washington
- Country: USA
- Inaugurated: 2003
- Attendance: 90,000 in 2026
- Organizer: ReedPop
- Website: Official website

The Emerald City Comic Con (ECCC), formerly the Emerald City Comicon, is an annual comic book convention taking place in Seattle, Washington. Originally taking place at the city's Qwest Field (first at West Field Plaza, then at the Event Center), the venue changed in 2008 to its current home at the Seattle Convention Center. The show expanded to a three-day event in 2011 and began using the entire convention center for the first time in 2013. In 2014, the Gaming portion of the show was moved to the third floor of the nearby Sheraton Seattle Hotel to make room for an expanded show floor.

== Programming ==
The convention features a wide array of activities and programming including industry guests, various discussion panels, celebrity signings and photo opportunities, prize drawings, and costume contests. It features a large and lively Exhibitor's hall with comics retailers from across the entire Pacific Northwest bringing a large stock of modern and vintage comics, as well as other products such as statues, action figures, models, etc. CCG, RPG, and tabletop gaming is supported in specific areas of the convention center.

== History ==
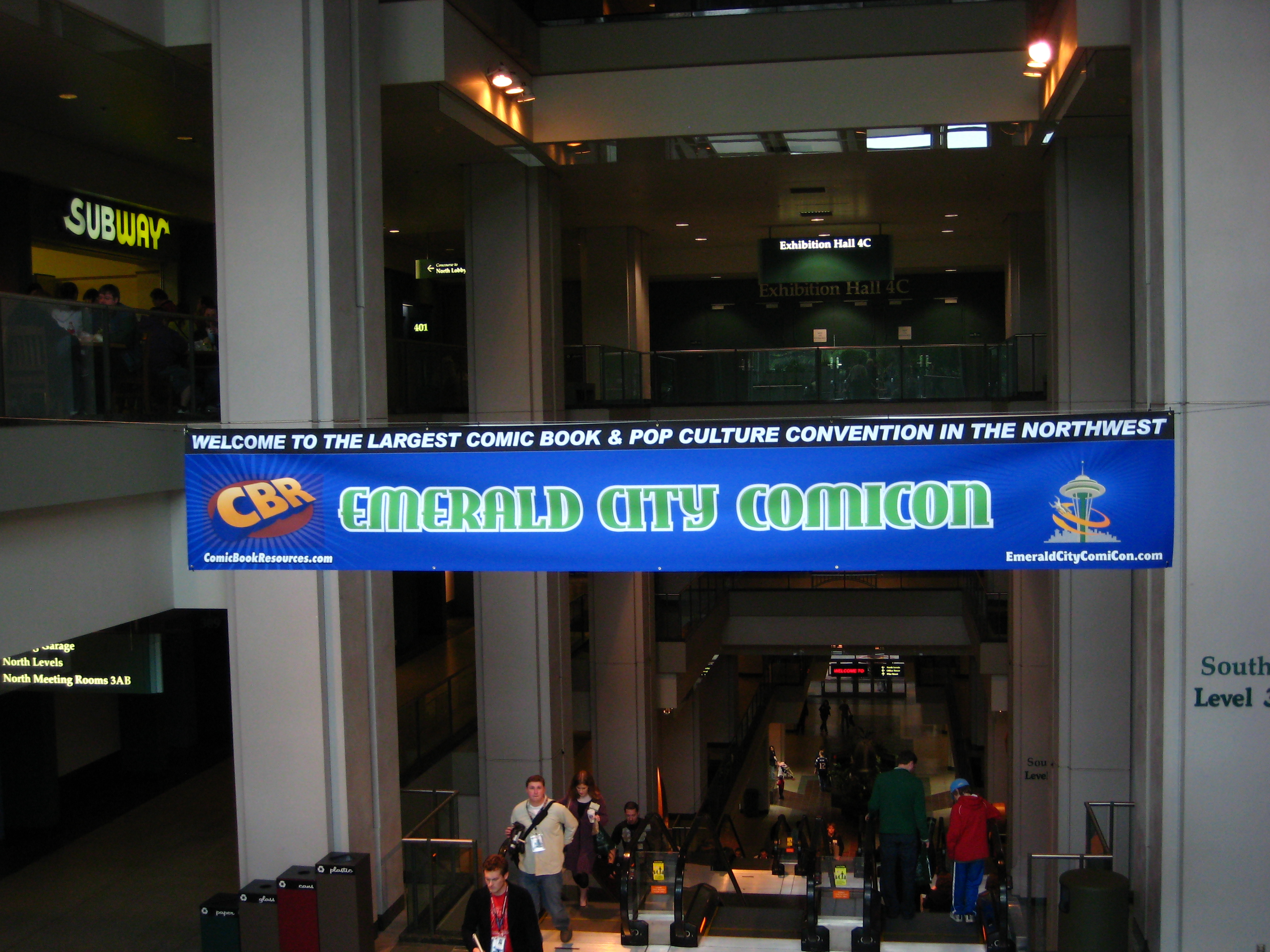
Banner across the convention center's escalators leading to the event at the 2008 event

The event began as the Emerald City ComiCon, a one-day event at the Qwest Field Events Center in 2003. It was founded by comics retailer and comic book creator Jim Demonakos of Mukilteo, Washington, and broke even with an attendance of 3,000 people. The event was acquired by Reed Exhibitions in 2015, after it had grown into a multi-day event at the Washington State Convention Center.

On March 6, 2020, ReedPop announced that the 2020 Emerald City Comic Con would be postponed from March 12–15 to August 21–23 because of the COVID-19 pandemic, which had been spreading in the Seattle area for several weeks. The rescheduled event was later cancelled in June and was replaced by a virtual event.

In 2021, the convention resumed as an in-person event, scheduled for December 2-5, 2021.

According to their website, ECCC 2024 brought in over 90,000 attendees and hosted over 900 events and panels and over 950 exhibitors and creators.

== Locations and dates ==
Dates	Location	Attendance
February 9, 2003	Qwest Field - West Field Plaza; Seattle, Washington	2,500
February 29, 2004	Qwest Field - West Field Plaza; Seattle, Washington	3,000
February 5–6, 2005	Qwest Field Event Center; Seattle, Washington	
April 1–2, 2006	Qwest Field Event Center; Seattle, Washington	
March 31–April 1, 2007	Qwest Field Event Center; Seattle, Washington	7,000
May 10–11, 2008	Washington State Convention Center; Seattle, Washington	10,000
April 4–5, 2009	Washington State Convention Center; Seattle, Washington	13,000
March 13–14, 2010	Washington State Convention Center; Seattle, Washington	20,000
March 4–6, 2011	Washington State Convention Center; Seattle, Washington	32,000
March 30–April 1, 2012	Washington State Convention Center; Seattle, Washington	53,000
March 1–3, 2013	Washington State Convention Center; Seattle, Washington	64,000
March 28–30, 2014	Washington State Convention Center; Seattle, Washington	70,000
March 27–29, 2015	Washington State Convention Center; Seattle, Washington	80,000
April 7–10, 2016	Washington State Convention Center; Seattle, Washington	88,000
March 2–5, 2017	Washington State Convention Center; Seattle, Washington	91,000
March 1–4, 2018	Washington State Convention Center; Seattle, Washington	95,000
March 14–17, 2019	Washington State Convention Center; Seattle, Washington	98,000
August 21–23, 2020	Washington State Convention Center; Seattle, Washington	Cancelled
December 2-5, 2021	Washington State Convention Center; Seattle, Washington	
August 18-21, 2022	Seattle Convention Center; Seattle, Washington	75,000
March 2-5, 2023	Seattle Convention Center; Seattle, Washington	
February 29-March 3, 2024	Seattle Convention Center; Seattle, Washington	90,000+
March 6-9, 2025	Seattle Convention Center; Seattle, Washington	
March 5-8, 2026	Seattle Convention Center; Seattle, Washington	90,000
