= Already Dead (Huston novel) =

2005 novel by Charlie Huston

- First edition
- Author: Charlie Huston
- Language: English
- Genre: Noir, Thriller, Horror
- Publisher: Del Rey
- Publication date: 27 December 2005
- Publication place: United States
- Media type: Print (hardback & paperback)
- Pages: 288 pp (first edition, hardback)
- ISBN: 978-0-345-47824-5 (first edition, hardback)
- OCLC: 57235799
- Dewey Decimal: 813/.6 22
- LC Class: PS3608.U855 A79 2005
- Followed by: No Dominion

Already Dead is a 2005 pulp-noir / horror novel by Charlie Huston and published in 2005. This is the first of the Joe Pitt Casebooks.

== Plot summary ==
Already Dead follows the adventures of a vampyre named Joe Pitt as he tries to figure out a mysterious zombie epidemic stemming around New York. He has connections in Manhattan Underworld which make him a valuable item for clans. Joe is then asked to find the gothic daughter of a rich man, and is pressured to do the work. Meanwhile, a disease is spreading zombie like symptoms around the town, causing whoever is bitten (or infected) by this disease into "Shamblers", and it's up to Joe to find the mysterious carrier of this sickness.

Aside from his line of work, Joe has a girlfriend named Evie, a human that is HIV positive, is currently terrified of any sexual contact since she's afraid of infecting him with the sickness. Joe knows how to cure her HIV, but fears the side effects; so he tries his best to keep his vampyrism a secret from her.

== Characters ==
Joe Pitt: The main protagonist; a vampire who works as a freelance detective doing odd jobs for other clans around New York for some blood; namely The Society and The Enclave, but occasionally, The Coalition. He has a human girlfriend named Evie, who is HIV positive. However, he keeps his vampyrism secret from her.

Evie: Joe's girlfriend, who's a redheaded waitress down at a bar he regulars at. She's also HIV positive, and refuses to get intimate with Joe out of fear of infecting him. Even though Joe knows the ultimate way to cure her, he's afraid of infecting her with the Vyrus and transforming her into a vampyre.

Philip Sax: Joe's pompadoured "sidekick" of sorts, but he is used mainly for syphoning information for Joe's various cases. Unfortunately, he's rather dimwitted and flaky, which angers Joe most of the time and ends up getting beaten if he doesn't do as Joe asks. He wants to become a vampyre (or as Joe refers to him, a "Renfield"), but Joe believes he's far too dumb.

Dexter Predo: A very powerful vampyre in charge of running The Coalition; the most prestigious clan in New York. Sometimes Joe takes odd jobs for him if he's in need of blood.

Terry Bird: Head of The Society; a vampyre with something of a hippie complex. He harbors a fondness for Joe, and, unlike Predo, can see that Joe has a sharp wit, and acts as a bit of a father-figure to vampyres in need. His main three cohorts are Lydia, a gay-and-lesbian rights activist, Tom, an anarchist who has an extreme hatred for Joe, and his burly Irish bodyguard, Hurley.

Daniel: Leader (and Elder) of the Enclave; a very old vampyre, but possibly one of the single most dangerous ones in Manhattan. He and his followers have made an art out of "starving" the Vyrus, so it could be stretched to its full potential in combat and survival. Tends to refer to Joe as by real name, "Simon", which usually aggravates him, but he believes Joe will be the one that eventually takes his place as leader.

== Potential film adaptation ==
Producer Mike DeLuca optioned the book, and hired screenwriter Scott Rosenberg to pen the screenplay in February 2007, for possible release through Phoenix Pictures in 2009.
