= G-Man (comics) =

Publication information
- Publisher: Image Comics
- First appearance: The Savage Dragon #104 (October 2002)
- Created by: Chris Giarrusso

In-story information
- Alter ego: Mikey G.
- Abilities: When Mikey wears a magical cape he is gifted the ability of flight, super-strength, and semi-invulnerability

G-Man is an all-ages comic book written and illustrated by Chris Giarrusso and published by Image Comics. The comic has been published in the form of back-ups in other comic books as well as original one-shots and trade paperback collections. The comic features a young superhero who gains the powers of super strength, super endurance and flight when he wears a magic cape. G-Man and his friends were introduced in Giarrusso's "Comic Bits", published in Image's Savage Dragon series. There are two G-Man collections: Learning to Fly and Cape Crisis. The first volume, Learning to Fly, was published in 2009 by Image Comics. The second novel, Cape Crisis, was published in 2010. The character G-MAN previously made small appearances in the Savage Dragon series.

== Story ==
The main character, Mikey G, wanted to be a superhero. He found a magic cape, which gave him the ability to fly, enhanced his strength and gave him some invulnerability. His older brother, Dave G, took a piece of the cape to make a belt. He called himself Great Man.

== Characters ==
- G-Man: Mikey G wanted to be a superhero like his friends. Using a magic blanket, he made a cape that gives him powers. Whenever asked what the G stands for, he says "it stands for G".
- Great Man: G-Man's brother, Dave. He fashioned a belt from the same blanket. He often bullies his brother, but sometimes shows a nicer side. He chose the name "Great Man" because he thought the G should stand for something.
- Mr. G: G-Man and Great Man's father. He's unimpressed by their superpowers, though he does appreciate that they can now fly over his lawn instead of walking on it.
- Billy Demon: G-Man's friend, who gained super-powers from yet-unknown events. Including super-strength, flight, fire breath, and enhanced senses.
- Sparky/the Spark: One of G-Man's friends, who gains super-speed from his magic shoes.
- Suntrooper Solazzo: One of G-Man's friends, and a member of the Suntroopers. He wears a suit that allows him to fly through space and fire solar blasts.
- Tanman: Another of G-Man's friends. He can change his color and the color of anything he touches, allowing him to camouflage. He can also turn invisible for as long as he can hold his breath. When relaxed, his colors are in a constant flux.
- Marksman: Tanman's cousin, a half-Elf with 99% accurate aim. He usually uses a bow and arrow, but can also wield other ranged weapons.
- Wizard Glendolf Williams: A wizard who often enlists in G-Man and his friends to help him. These quests range from stopping universal crisis to programming his VCR.
- Kid Thunder: Son of local superhero Captain Thunderman. He was originally a bully who blasted anyone who flew in "his" sky, but after Great Man beat him up, he became nicer. He and Great Man are now friends.
