= Empty Beaches =

Studio album / LP by Cecimonster Vs. Donka
- Released: July 8, 2015
- Recorded: December 2014 at Kanaku Estudio, Lima, Peru
- Genre: Alternative rock, indie rock
- Length: 22:14
- Language: English, Spanish
- Label: Anti-Rudo
- Producer: Bruno Bellatin (producer)

Cecimonster Vs. Donka chronology
Adentro Afuera (2012)	Empty Beaches (2015)	A Big House by the Lake (2019)

Empty Beaches is the third studio album by alternative rock band Cecimonster Vs. Donka from Lima, Peru.

== Track listing ==
All tracks are written by Cecimonster Vs. Donka

No.	Title	Length
1.	"Koyangi (for Salma)"	2:07
2.	"Not Your Friend"	3:34
3.	"I'm Alright"	2:39
4.	"Home"	2:52
5.	"Despacio"	2:55
6.	"Minkamar"	3:25
7.	"Monday"	2:00
8.	"I Feel My Body Break"	2:42
Total length:		22:14

== Personnel ==
Band Members

- Sergio Saba – vocals, guitar
- Sebastian Kouri – guitar
- Alonso García – bass guitar
- Sandro Labenita – Drums

Additional personnel

- Bruno Bellatin and Julio Alvarado – Production and engineering
- Saito Chinén – Mixing and mastering
