= Adentro Afuera =

Studio album by Cecimonster Vs. Donka
- Released: August 1, 2012
- Recorded: June 2012 at Mundano Records, Lima, Peru
- Genre: Alternative rock, post-hardcore, indie rock
- Length: 39:23
- Language: English; Spanish
- Label: Anti Rudo Records
- Producer: Saito Chinén (producer)

Cecimonster Vs. Donka chronology
Solara (2011)	Adentro Afuera (2012)	Empty Beaches (2015)

Adentro Afuera is the second album by Peruvian alternative rock band Cecimonster Vs. Donka. One music video was released to promote the album: One Hundred Years. The band got a nomination for best band in the country by El Comercio in 2012

== Track listing ==
All tracks are written by Cecimonster Vs. Donka

No.	Title	Length
1.	"SNA"	2:37
2.	"Voices"	4:23
3.	"Ámbar"	2:20
4.	"One Hundred Years"	3:51
5.	"Family"	5:04
6.	"Adentro Afuera"	3:33
7.	"Pontevedra"	1:43
8.	"Hoy Somos Japón"	3:43
9.	"Memories"	4:34
10.	"Panamericana"	3:45
11.	"Lay Here (Dreaming)"	3:54
Total length:		39:23

== Personnel ==
Band members

- Sergio Saba – vocals, guitar
- Sebastian Kouri – guitar
- Alonso García – bass guitar
- Patrick Mitchell – drums

Additional personnel

- Aldo Rodriguez – Backing vocals on Family and Panamericana
- María Laura Bustamante – Backing vocals on Family
- Saito Chinén – Production, engineering, mastering
