= Supergod =

2009–10 comic book limited series

- Supergod issue 1 (November 2009)

Publication information
- Publisher: Avatar Press
- Schedule: Monthly
- Format: Limited series
- Genre: Superhero
- Publication date: October 2009 – 2010
- No. of issues: 5

Creative team
- Created by: Warren Ellis; Garrie Gastonny
- Written by: Warren Ellis
- Artist: Garrie Gastonny
- Editor: William A. Christensen

Collected editions
- Supergod: ISBN 1-59291-099-8

Supergod is a 5-issue comic book limited series created by Warren Ellis, published by Avatar Press, with art by Garrie Gastonny. Issue 1 was released in November 2009.

In an essay written at the time of publication, Warren Ellis said:

Supergod is the story of what an actual superhuman arms race might be like. It's a simple thing to imagine. Humans have been fashioning their own gods with their own hands since the dawn of our time on Earth. We can't help ourselves. Fertility figures brazen idols, vast chalk etchings, carvings, myths and legends, science fiction writers generating science fiction religions from whole cloth. It's not such a great leap to conceive of the builders of nuclear weapons and particle accelerators turning their attention to the oldest of human pursuits. Dress it up as superhuman defense, as discovering the limits of the human body, as transhumanism and posthumanism.

Supergod is regarded as the third and final series in Ellis' Avatar Press-published "Superhuman Trilogy" dealing with the creation of superheroes, preceded by Black Summer and No Hero. Prior to Supergod's release, Warren Ellis said in an interview that, "Black Summer was about superhumans who were too human. No Hero was about superhumans who were inhuman. Supergod is about superhumans who are no longer human at all, but something else. The third leg of a thematic trilogy if you like."

== Plot ==
Supergod is narrated from the point of view of Simon Reddin, a British scientist who sits in the ruins of post-apocalyptic London, waiting to die. Reddin tells his story to "Tommy," an American counterpart taking refuge in a bunker, in order to provide an oral history of the events that led to the end of the world.

In years before the onset of the Space Race between the United States and the Soviet Union, Great Britain secretly launches an experimental rocket based on Wernher von Braun's notes with a crew of three astronauts to observe the effects of outer space on the human body. When the rocket returns to Earth, scientists find that the three astronauts have been fused together into one gigantic, three-headed being by a mass of alien fungus. This creature is named "Morrigan Lugus", after multi-headed deities from Celtic mythology.

Britain's possession and study of Lugus spur the other developed nations of the world to begin developing their own superhuman programs. (This is ostensibly a military arms race, but several times throughout his story, Reddin injects his own opinion, supported by a speech from Lugus, that human beings have a psychological compulsion to construct idols to worship, effectively creating their own gods.) The United States creates Jerry Craven, a cyborg built from the broken body of a crashed Air Force pilot; Russia creates Perun, an advanced cyborg built from the remains of a previous model destroyed by Craven; Iran creates Malak al-Maut, able to generate a force field that dissolves the atomic bonds of nearby matter; China creates Maitreya, who can shape and manipulate human flesh into complex objects.

In the early 21st century, India activates Krishna, its own superhuman. Krishna is built with state-of-the-art technology, granting it godlike control over both matter and energy, and is governed by a simple artificial intelligence program with instructions to "save India." Krishna takes this command to its logical extreme, solving India's problems of pollution and severe overpopulation by laying waste to the country and slaughtering most of its inhabitants. The chaos in India prompts Pakistan to launch its entire arsenal of nuclear missiles against Krishna, but Krishna merely turns the weapons around, obliterating Pakistan.

These catastrophic events provoke other nations to mobilize their own superhumans against Krishna. Reddin, part of the team studying Morrigan Lugus, argues that since Krishna does not appear to value human life, Lugus—as a higher form of life, like Krishna himself—should be released from the underground chamber where it is held so that it may communicate with Krishna and convince him to halt his rampage. Faced with no other way of stopping Krishna, the British government agrees.

All attacks on Krishna fail, as he is far too powerful for any of the other superbeings to pose a threat to him. Perun and Maitreya are easily killed, and Malak is catapulted into space, where his force field shatters the Moon, causing lunar fragments to rain destruction upon the Earth. With his enemies defeated, Krishna begins the process of rebuilding India, creating advanced structures capable of cleaning up the devastated environment and housing its surviving population. Jerry Craven arrives on the scene, but recognizing that Krishna is now improving India and mentally traumatized by his own death and resurrection, he expresses his desire to live in peace with Krishna.

However, Craven is joined by Dajjal, a bizarre, incomplete superhuman covertly developed by an American private military contractor during the Iraq War. Dajjal was designed to be "without sanity," allowing it to directly observe the flow of time and to perceive all possible future outcomes. Dajjal implies that all potential timelines resulting from Craven and Krishna's truce will result in a utopia, and will all be "so boring" that Dajjal cannot bear to live through them. To avoid this fate, Dajjal self-destructs, resulting in a massive explosion that destroys most of Asia and Europe, killing both Krishna and Craven in the process.

In the present, with his story finished, Reddin bids farewell to Tommy, strips off his clothes, and prepares to leap into the River Thames to meet his "god": Morrigan Lugus, the last surviving superbeing, whose spores have infested the entire planet. As Reddin points out during his narrative, fungi only grow on dead things.

== Collected editions ==
The series has been collected:

- trade paperback: Supergod (128 pages, December 2010, ISBN 1-59291-099-8)
- Hardback: Supergod (128 pages, August 2011, ISBN 1-59291-100-5)

== Reception ==
Cory Doctorow called the work "magnificently grim and horrifying". Comic Book Resources found it to be "(o)riginal, inventive, and very good", but also "somewhat jarring". Io9 noted that, of Ellis's many works exploring "the real-world ramifications of superheroics", Supergod is "by far the sexiest", and compared it to a cross between Street Fighter 2 and Kaiju Big Battel.
