= My Dead Body =

2009 novel by Charlie Huston

- First edition
- Author: Charlie Huston
- Language: English
- Genre: Detective; Noir; Modern fantasy Thriller; Urban Fantasy
- Publisher: Del Rey
- Publication date: October 13, 2009
- Publication place: United States
- Media type: Print Paperback)
- Pages: 336 pp (first edition, paperback)
- ISBN: 978-0-345-49589-1 (first edition, paperback)
- Preceded by: Every Last Drop

My Dead Body is a 2009 pulp-noir / horror novel by American writer Charlie Huston. It is the fifth novel in the Joe Pitt Casebooks, following Every Last Drop. The series follows the life of the New York vampyre Joe Pitt, who works sometimes as an enforcer for various vampyre factions in New York and sometimes as a sort of detective.

== Plot summary ==
My Dead Body brings the story arc of the preceding four books of the Joe Pitt series to a close, as the rival vampyre factions of Manhattan Island face off.
