= Sleepless (novel) =

2010 novel by Charlie Huston

- First edition
- Author: Charlie Huston
- Language: English
- Genre: Detective / Science fiction novel
- Publisher: Ballantine Books
- Publication date: 2010
- Publication place: United States
- Media type: Print (hardcover)
- Pages: 353 pp
- ISBN: 978-0-345-50113-4
- OCLC: 326529039
- LC Class: PS3608.U855S64 2009

Sleepless is a science fiction and noir detective novel by Charlie Huston, published in 2010.

Set in California in a dystopic alternate present, the novel portrays a world wracked by a sleeplessness pandemic caused by a prion. About ten percent of the population are infected, and, unable to find sleep, die painfully within a year. Society is on the verge of breakdown, and armed bands have turned much of the U.S. into a war zone. The novel follows Parker Haas, an idealist LAPD officer investigating the trafficking of "dreamer", the only drug capable of giving the sleepless temporary relief, and Jasper, an aging professional killer who crosses Haas' path.

== Reception ==
The novel was generally well received by critics, with The Scotsman describing it as a "traditional police procedural tucked into a stunningly original work of speculative fiction". Strange Horizons welcomed the crime writer's first foray into speculative fiction, highlighting the novel's "coherent and exciting, familiar and wrongfooting" vision of a dystopic alternate present and Huston's "gift for dialogue and for moving the plot along", while noting that the seemingly desperate "grasping at coolness" of the setting and characters stretches plausibility. Publishers Weekly appreciated Sleepless as a "brilliant mixture of sci-fi and noir crime", while noting that "fans of Huston’s crime fiction may not be comfortable with a novel that itself resembles a role-playing game", in reference to the massively multiplayer online role-playing game that links the novel's narrative strands.
