= Caught Stealing =

2025 film by Darren Aronofsky

- Theatrical release poster
- Directed by: Darren Aronofsky
- Screenplay by: Charlie Huston
- Based on: Caught Stealing by Charlie Huston
- Produced by: Jeremy Dawson; Dylan Golden; Ari Handel; Darren Aronofsky
- Starring: Austin Butler; Regina King; Zoë Kravitz; Matt Smith; Liev Schreiber; Vincent D'Onofrio; Benito Martínez Ocasio; Griffin Dunne; Carol Kane
- Cinematography: Matthew Libatique
- Edited by: Andrew Weisblum
- Music by: Rob Simonsen; Idles
- Production companies: Columbia Pictures; Protozoa Pictures
- Distributed by: Sony Pictures Releasing
- Release date: August 29, 2025
- Running time: 107 minutes
- Country: United States
- Language: English
- Budget: $40 million
- Box office: $33.3 million

Caught Stealing is a 2025 American black comedy crime thriller film directed by Darren Aronofsky and starring Austin Butler as a former star baseball player-turned-bartender who unwittingly runs afoul of New York City's criminal underbelly while pet sitting for his neighbor. Regina King, Zoë Kravitz, Matt Smith, Liev Schreiber, Vincent D'Onofrio, Benito Martínez Ocasio, Griffin Dunne, and Carol Kane appear in supporting roles. The film is based on a 2004 novel of the same name by Charlie Huston, who adapted it for the screenplay. The film's score was written by Rob Simonsen and recorded by the British post-punk band Idles.

Produced by Columbia Pictures in association with Protozoa Pictures, Caught Stealing was released in the United States by Sony Pictures Releasing on August 29, 2025. The film has received generally positive reviews from critics and grossed $33.3 million worldwide.

== Plot ==
In 1998, Henry "Hank" Thompson is a bartender living on the Lower East Side. He calls his mother in Patterson, California, every day, especially to discuss their shared love of the San Francisco Giants. Hank is haunted by a drunken car crash that killed his friend, ended his major league baseball ambitions, and left him with a dependency on alcohol.

Hank's English punk neighbor Russ Miner is returning to London to see his ailing father, tasking Hank to care for his cat, Bud. Two Russian mobsters, Aleksei and Pavel, later arrive in search of Russ and viciously beat Hank to the point that he needs emergency surgery to remove his ruptured kidney. After the Russians break into Russ's apartment, narcotics detective Elise Roman questions Hank and reveals Russ is a drug dealer connected to the notorious Hasidic Drucker brothers. Finding a key hidden in Bud's litter box, Hank notifies Roman when the Druckers search Russ's apartment.

After getting drunk at Paul's Bar, Hank leaves his clothes outside his building. Interrogated by the Russians and their Puerto Rican associate Colorado, Hank cannot remember what happened to the key. Hank leaves the injured Bud with his girlfriend Yvonne and remembers taking the key to the bar. Chased by the Druckers, he informs Colorado, who mentions Yvonne. Suddenly realizing she is in danger, he races back to her apartment only to find she has been killed.

A guilt-stricken Hank confides in Roman, who tells him of her dreams of retiring to Tulum before revealing herself to be in league with Colorado and the Russians. Roman claims that that gang are not the group responsible for Yvonne's murder. Looking for the key, they go to Paul's Bar, where an altercation results in the killings of bar regular Amtrak and Colorado. Lying that the key is in the basement strongroom's safe, Paul retrieves a shotgun but is killed in the ensuing chaos. Hank locks himself in the strongroom, forcing the others to leave empty-handed.

Hank recovers the key from the homeless Jason, left in the clothes he abandoned. Russ returns home but is hit in the head with a baseball bat when Hank mistakes him for an intruder. Russ explains that after selling drugs for the Druckers in Colorado's nightclubs, he was forced to involve Roman, who owes money to the Russians' boss. The key unlocks a storage unit with just over $4 million he was meant to split between the various parties on the day he left for London. Fearing for his life, Russ prepares to take the money and flee the country, leaving Hank as the fall guy, but Hank knocks him unconscious.

Meeting with Roman and the Russians, Hank offers them Russ and the key in exchange for Bud. Russ panics and kills Aleksei before escaping with Hank and Bud, suggesting that Roman might have been the one who killed Yvonne. They get away on the subway, where Russ succumbs to his injuries. Hank spends the night on Coney Island. Roman calls the following day, demanding he bring the key to the Russians' supper club, Hermitage, otherwise he will be framed for all the murders, and hints at killing his mother. After calling to warn her, Hank goes to see the Druckers. They agree to kill Roman in exchange for Hank leading them to the money.

As they arrive at the club, Hank is restrained to the steering wheel while the Druckers shoot the place up. Hank breaks free when seeing Roman flee and chases her. He injures Roman by impaling her foot with the broken baseball bat handle, whereupon the Druckers arrive to kill her. Hank reveals where he hid the key, in a bandage on Bud's leg, and the brothers decide to let him live with a share of the money. They force him to drive them home, when Hank notices that Lipa has Yvonne's lighter. Noticing his reaction to the lighter, the brothers admit they killed Yvonne to send a message to Hank for evading them. Hank purposefully crashes the car, this time killing the two brothers. Some time later, Hank escapes to Tulum posing as Russ and taking Bud with him. He mails the other half of the money to his mother.

== Cast ==
- Austin Butler as Henry "Hank" Thompson
- Regina King as Det. Elise Roman
- Zoë Kravitz as Yvonne
- Matt Smith as Russ Miner
- Liev Schreiber as Lipa Drucker
- Vincent D'Onofrio as Shmully Drucker
- Bad Bunny as Colorado
- Griffin Dunne as Paul
- Carol Kane as Bubbe
- Action Bronson as Amtrak
- George Abud as Duane
- Macy Rodman as Macy
- Nikita Kukushkin as Pavel ("Microbe")
- Yuri Kolokolnikov as Aleksei
- D'Pharaoh Woon-A-Tai as Dale
- Will Brill as Jason
- Tenoch Huerta as a Tulum bartender
- Tonic as Bud the cat
- Laura Dern as Hank's mother (uncredited)

== Production ==
In 2013, screenwriter David Hayter was developing an adaptation of Charlie Huston's trilogy of novels centered on the character of Hank Thompson, with Patrick Wilson set in the lead role. A new film adaptation was reported to be in development at Sony Pictures in March 2024, with Huston adapting their own novel, Darren Aronofsky directing, Austin Butler attached to star and Protozoa Pictures producing. In July 2024, Zoë Kravitz and Regina King joined the cast in undisclosed roles. In August, Matt Smith, Liev Schreiber, and Bad Bunny were added to the cast, with Griffin Dunne, Vincent D'Onofrio, D'Pharaoh Woon-A-Tai, and Action Bronson joining the following month. Smith had to audition four times to secure his part. In December 2024, it was announced that Carol Kane had joined the cast in a role where she mostly speaks Yiddish.

Principal photography began on September 5, 2024, in New York City. The film had a net production budget of $40 million. The film's score was written by Rob Simonsen and recorded by the British post-punk band Idles. According to lead singer Joe Talbot, the collaboration originated from a "chance backstage meeting" with Aronofsky while recording an episode of The Tonight Show Starring Jimmy Fallon, on which both had appeared as guests. The band also contributed five songs to the soundtrack, including a cover of Junior Murvin's "Police and Thieves".

== Release ==
Caught Stealing had its world premiere on August 7, 2025, in Guaynabo, Puerto Rico, at Caribbean Cinemas with director Darren Aronofsky in attendance, as well as Austin Butler and Bad Bunny, who is credited by his birth name, Benito A. Martínez Ocasio. The premiere was held in Puerto Rico to promote the island, as well as coinciding with Bad Bunny's sold-out 31-date concert residency, being held about 8 miles away from the theater, which Aronofsky and Butler attended as Bad Bunny's VIP attendees.

The film was released in the United States on August 29, 2025.

== Reception ==
=== Box office ===
As of June 6, 2026, the film has grossed $19 million in the United States and $14 million internationally for a worldwide total of $33 million. With an estimated net production budget of $40 million when tax credits are factored in, it was considered a box office failure, though it has since performed very well on home video.

=== Critical response ===
On the review aggregator website Rotten Tomatoes, 85% of 257 critics' reviews are positive, with an average rating of 6.9/10. The website's consensus reads: "A freewheeling throwback, Caught Stealing splendidly showcases Austin Butler's movie star charisma while marking a surprisingly lighthearted gearshift for director Darren Aronofsky." Metacritic, which uses a weighted average, assigned the film a score of 65 out of 100, based on 47 critics, indicating "generally favorable" reviews. Audiences polled by CinemaScore gave the film an average grade of "B" on an A+ to F scale.
