= Shrapnel =

Shrapnel may refer to:

== Military ==
- Shrapnel shell, explosive artillery munitions, generally for anti-personnel use
- Shrapnel (fragment), a hard loose material

== Popular culture ==
- Shrapnel (Radical Comics)
- Shrapnel, a game by Adam Cadre
- Shrapnel (film), a 2023 action thriller directed by William Kaufman

=== Characters ===
- Shrapnel (DC Comics), a supervillain
- Shrapnel (Transformers)

=== Music ===
- Shrapnel (American punk band), an American punk band
- Shrapnel (Welsh punk band), a 1981–1988 musical group
- Shrapnel (English band), an English thrash metal band
- Shrapnel Records, music label
- Shrapnel, a.k.a. Metal Church, an American heavy metal band
- "Shrapnel", a song on the Atmosphere album God Loves Ugly

== People ==
- Henry Jones Shrapnell (1792–1834), anatomist
- Henry Shrapnel (1761–1842), British Army officer and anti-personnel-munition innovator
- Norman Shrapnel (1912–2004), writer
- John Shrapnel (1942–2020), actor
- Hugh Shrapnel (born 1947), composer
- Lex Shrapnel (born 1979), actor

== See also ==
- Shrapnell's membrane, a portion of the tympanic membrane
