= Joe Pitt Casebooks =

Thriller series by Charlie Hutson

- Author: Charlie Huston
- Language: English
- Genre: Noir, Thriller, Horror
- Publisher: Ballantine (United States)
- Publication date: 2005–09
- Publication place: United States
- Media type: Print Paperback
- Pages: (United States) (so far)

The Joe Pitt Casebooks are a series of supernatural noir thrillers written by American author Charlie Huston. Each casebook chronicles Joe Pitt's life as well as his struggles in the underground of vampyre clans of New York. At first Pitt is an unaffiliated vampyre, living in between the cracks by doing jobs for various clans in exchange for blood and freedom. However, as the series progresses, this shifts and Pitt's life evolves with each book.

== Series ==
There are five books in the Joe Pitt Casebooks series:

1. Already Dead (December 27, 2005)
2. No Dominion (December 26, 2006)
3. Half the Blood of Brooklyn (December 26, 2007)
4. Every Last Drop (September 30, 2008)
5. My Dead Body (October 13, 2009)

== Overview ==
=== Setting ===
The stories take place in modern-day New York City, primarily on Manhattan Island (and sometimes in Brooklyn, the Bronx, or Queens).

=== Clans ===
In the Joe Pitt Series, local vampyres have loosely organized themselves into clans, each with their own territory on Manhattan Island. Each of the clans jealously guards their own territory from other vampyres, as their continued existence is largely dependent on being able to feed on humans unnoticed - a feat that becomes increasingly difficult as their population increases. Vampyres who are not a member of a clan are referred to as Rogues.

The Coalition

The Coalition is the largest and most powerful of the clans, with more members and resources than any other clan. In the fourth book of the series, Pitt estimates that the Coalition may have as many as a thousand members. However, throughout the fifth book, it also becomes clear that the Coalition is actively supporting other minor clans across the island. The Coalition seems to operate in a cross between the mafia and a corporation. Dexter Predo is the face of the organization, sometimes described as being in charge of the organization's enforcers and, at one point, describing himself as chief of intelligence. By the end of the fifth book it becomes clear the Predo answers to a person or persons calling themselves the "Secretariate."

The Enclave

A clan of vampyres who organize themselves as a religion, roughly analogous to Buddhist monks. The central tenet of their faith is that the vyrus is supernatural and possibly divine. They focus on allowing the vyrus to slowly consume them in the hope that, one day, they will be able to walk in the sun without burning. The Enclave is often portrayed as a group of mad zealots, but their leader, Daniel considers Pitt to be a member of clan. As such, Pitt often turns to the Enclave for information. In the fourth book, Pitt estimates the Enclave consists of roughly a hundred members, but between the fourth and fifth book, that number doubles. The Count later takes over the enclave, when Daniel tests his faith and walks into direct sun light. Joe is no longer considered a member and is now an enemy, because of the Count. The Enclave is feared and avoided by every other clan, and a 'no man's land' of several blocks is observed around their headquarters, though they do not take active part in any of the Clan affairs.

The Hood

A clan that organizes and conducts itself like a street gang, unifying visible minorities such as African-Americans and Latinos, initially formed by a man called Luther X. Luther split the clan from the Coalition years before the first book, and as of the second, has died - apparently of an assassination. His protégé, DJ Grave Digga takes over control of the clan and declares a state of emergency, assuming total control in order to combat the Coalition, who he believes is responsible for Luther's Death. By the end of the second book, Digga assures his continued control of the clan by discovering that Papa Doc. the leader of his opposition and head of the tons tons macoute, the Hood's enforcers (named for the Haitian secret police force) is guilty of trafficking a drug called 'Anathema' within The Hood and on Society turf. The Hood concerns itself primarily with the welfare of visible minorities and opposition of The Coalition. They enjoy cordial relations with The Society.

The Society

The Society is a prominent clan in lower Manhattan, and Joe Pitt lives on their turf as a Rogue (non-Clan member). It is run by Terry Bird and is made up of a ragtag mixture of Anarchists, Gay rights activists, and other small groups. The highest power level is made up of Bird, Lydia (gay rights), Tom (Anarchists), and Hurley, who is the main bodyguard to the three. Their mission is to bring together all the clans into a single group and go public with information of The Vyrus so that they may live like normal people, and a cure may one day be found.

Minor Factions

During the course of the series, a large number of other clans and factions are mentioned in passing, including The Dusters, a clan that organizes itself as a biker gang, The Bulls and Bears, Mungiki, The Family, The Cannon Balls, and others. Maps at the front of the fourth book hint that there might be even more clans that go unmentioned in the series.

== Main characters ==
Joe Pitt: Joe Pitt (born Simon) is the main character of the series. In the beginning of the series, Pitt is an unaffiliated vampyre who gets by doing odd jobs for the different clans of New York. However, by the end of the first book, Pitt has pretty much pissed the Coalition off, causing him to no longer receive much needed jobs to keep his stash of blood up. By the end of the second book, No Dominion, Pitt has joined Terry Bird's group, The Society, giving him immunity from the Coalition due to treaties and the need to avoid a war. However, in the third book, Half the Blood of Brooklyn, Pitt is sentenced to death by Bird's group, and is rescued by a former Society member. Joe ends up pissing the Enclave off as well, making him a marked man again, by most of the big clans of New York.

Terry Bird: Head of The Society; a vampyre with something of a hippie complex. He harbors a fondness for Joe, and, unlike Predo, can see that Joe has a sharp wit, and acts as a bit of a father-figure to vampyres in need.

Daniel: Leader (and Elder) of the Enclave; a very old vampyre, but possibly one of the single most dangerous ones in Manhattan. He and his followers have made an art out of "starving" the Vyrus, so it could be stretched to its full potential in combat and survival. Tends to refer to Joe as by real name, "Simon", which usually aggravates him, but he believes Joe will be the one that eventually takes his place as leader.

Dexter Predo: A very powerful vampyre in charge of running the security apparatus of The Coalition, the most prestigious clan in New York. Sometimes Joe takes odd jobs for him if he's in need of blood. Predo is powerful, but he is ultimately a pawn of the Coalition Secretariat, a claque of what are implied to be ancient and very wealthy vampyres.

Amanda Horde: Scientist, daughter of a wealthy magnate, Amanda is trying to isolate and create a cure for the vyrus, creating a safe haven for vampyres who wish to be cured in the process.

== Secondary Characters ==
Evie: Joe's girlfriend, a redheaded bar tender who works at Joe's regular hang-out. She's HIV positive at the beginning of the series, but her health eventually deteriorates. The relationship she and Joe share is often rocky, as Joe insists on keeping his life a secret from her.

Hurley: Terry's extremely burly Irish bodyguard

Lydia Miles: The head of the LGBT faction of the Society. Often acts as one of Terry's lieutenants.

Philip Sax: A drug dealer and user who often plays the part of Joe's informant.

Tom Nolan: An anarchist who handles security for Terry. Is extremely antagonistic towards Joe.

DJ Grave Digga: Leader of the Hood clan who is attempting to capitalize on tensions between the Society and the Coalition.

The Count: A trust-fund college party-boy who intends to continue his carefree lifestyle even after being infected with the vyrus.

Sela: A pre-op transgender vampyre who serves as both bodyguard and lover to Amanda Horde.

Christian: Leader of the Dusters motorcycle clan who has a history with Joe.

== Minor characters ==
Skag Baron Menace: Leader of the Mungiki clan in Queens, a group of vampyres who sharpen their teeth and wear claws.

Lament: Dickensian Fagin-type character who creates and terrorizes child vampyres.

Esperanza: Top vampyre in the Bronx who may have more than a professional interest in Joe.

Chubby Freeze: Unusually well-spoken internet porn producer who has professional dealings with Joe.

Stretch: Leader of Brooklyn-based clan called the Freaks.

Rebbe Moishe: Leader of The Chosen vampyre clan in Brooklyn.

Mrs. Vandewater: Dangerous grande dame of the Coalition who may have ties to both Predo and Terry.

Percy: One-armed barber to DJ Grave Digga who also has more secretive ties.

Leprosy: Runaway squatter and sometime informant to Joe; has a mean dog named Gristle.

== See also ==
- Charlie Huston
