= Wolverine: The Best There Is =

Monthly comic book series

Publication information
- Publisher: Marvel Comics
- Schedule: Monthly
- Format: Ongoing series
- Genre: Superhero
- Publication date: December 2010 – December 2011
- Main character: Wolverine

Creative team
- Written by: Charlie Huston
- Artist: Juan Jose Ryp

Wolverine: The Best There Is was a monthly comic book series published by Marvel Comics from 2010 to 2012, and starring the superhero Wolverine. The series was written by Charlie Huston and illustrated by Juan Jose Ryp, and premiered with a first issue (cover-dated February 2011) in December 2010. It ended with issue #12 (cover-dated February 2012) in December 2011.

== Publication history ==
While The Best There Is is not published under Marvel's MAX imprint, writer Charlie Huston has stated his intent to differ this title from the more mainstream Marvel series in which Wolverine is regularly featured.

== Plot summary ==
In the "Contagion" storyline, which ran in issues 1-6, Wolverine faces Contagion, an opponent who becomes a much bigger problem if he is killed.

== Reception ==
Wolverine: The Best There Is #1 received a rating of 1.5 out of 10 from IGN, a score described as "Unbearable" with reviewer Dan Iverson saying it had not a single redeeming quality. He blames writer Charlie Huston for 99% of what is wrong with the book, with only 1% of the blame going to artist Juan Jose Ryp for his artwork. Chris Murphy of ComicsAlliance is strongly critical, calling it an "unfortunate compromise" stuck between an adult story, and trying to sell to a general audience. He also complains that Wolverine is an overexposed character. In keeping with the censored swearing used in the comic, he describes it as "####".

Comic Book Resources gives it a rating of 3.0 out of 5. Reviewer Chad Nevett calls it a slightly above average beginning with a strong cliffhanger, but notes the need to settle on a tone.

== Collected editions ==
Title	Material collected	Publication date	ISBN
Wolverine: The Best There Is - Contagion	Wolverine: The Best There Is #1-6	July 2011	0785144463
Wolverine: The Best There Is - Broken Quarantine	Wolverine: The Best There Is #7-12	January 2012	078515633X
