= Every Last Drop =

2008 novel by Charlie Huston

- First edition
- Author: Charlie Huston
- Language: English
- Genre: Detective; Noir; Modern fantasy Thriller; Urban Fantasy
- Publisher: Del Rey
- Publication date: September 30, 2008
- Publication place: United States
- Media type: Print (paperback)
- Pages: 272 pp (first edition, paperback)
- ISBN: 978-0-345-49588-4 (first edition, paperback)
- Preceded by: Half the Blood of Brooklyn
- Followed by: My Dead Body

Every Last Drop is a 2008 pulp-noir/horror novel by American writer Charlie Huston. It is the fourth novel in the Joe Pitt Casebooks, following Half the Blood of Brooklyn. The series follows the life of the New York vampyre Joe Pitt, who works sometimes as an enforcer for various vampyre factions in New York and sometimes as a sort of detective.

== Characters ==
This book introduces a number of new characters to the series, including Esperanza Lucretia Benjamin, the vampyre nominally in charge of Queens.
