= Half the Blood of Brooklyn =

2007 novel by Charlie Huston

- Author: Charlie Huston
- Language: English
- Genre: Detective; Noir; Modern fantasy Thriller; Urban Fantasy
- Publisher: Del Rey
- Publication date: December 26, 2007
- Publication place: United States
- Media type: Print Paperback)
- Pages: 223 pp (first edition, paperback)
- ISBN: 978-0-345-49587-7 (first edition, paperback)
- Preceded by: No Dominion
- Followed by: Every Last Drop

Half the Blood of Brooklyn is a 2007 pulp-noir/horror novel by American writer Charlie Huston. It is the third novel in the Joe Pitt Casebooks, following No Dominion. The series follows the life of the New York vampire Joe Pitt, who sometimes works as an enforcer for various vampire factions in New York and sometimes as a sort of detective.
