= No Hero (comics) =

Superhero comic book series

- Variant cover by Juan José Ryp, based on the cover to The Amazing Spider-Man #129.

Publication information
- Publisher: Avatar Press
- Schedule: Monthly
- Format: Limited series
- Genre: Science fiction, superhero
- Publication date: July 2008 – September 2009
- No. of issues: 8

Creative team
- Created by: Warren Ellis; Juan Jose Ryp
- Written by: Warren Ellis
- Artist: Juan Jose Ryp
- Colorist(s): Greg Waller; Digikore Studios
- Editor: William A. Christensen

Collected editions
- Limited edition hardcover: ISBN 1-59291-085-8

No Hero is a superhero comic book created by writer Warren Ellis and Juan Jose Ryp.

No Hero is regarded as the second series in Ellis' Avatar Press-published "Superhuman Trilogy" dealing with the creation of superheroes, preceded by Black Summer, and followed by Supergod. Prior to Supergod's release, Warren Ellis said in an interview that, "Black Summer was about superhumans who were too human. No Hero was about superhumans who were inhuman. Supergod is about superhumans who are no longer human at all, but something else. The third leg of a thematic trilogy if you like."

== Plot summary ==
No Hero takes place in a world where superheroes have existed since the 1960s and came about as a reaction to increasingly violent police reactions to the American counter-culture movement as well as violent street crime. The original heroes of the 1960s called themselves "The Levellers" after the popular movement that came out of the English Civil War. The Levellers eventually evolved into "The Front Line" who derive their superpowers from a drug called FX 7 that have side-effects as dangerous as the powers they gain. The exact makeup of FX 7 is a tightly guarded secret, with many government groups having tried to emulate its effects with disastrous consequences. The story focuses on a man named Joshua Carver who comes to Front Line's attention after performing several minor acts of vigilantism in his hometown, and is offered the chance to use FX 7 to become a superhero by Carrick Masterson, the original inventor of FX 7 and founder of Front Line, who is immortal and ageless from the use of the drug.

Throughout the first half of the story, the reader is also shown that Front Line has been using its metahuman forces to control world events through actions such as assassinating Boris Yeltsin, destroying the Iran oilfields, dissolving South Africa, and preventing France from developing nuclear weapons, in the name of world stability.

Joshua takes the FX 7 pill and gains incredible powers, but with a horrifying side-effect: Joshua's skin, teeth and genitals rot off, leaving him monstrously disfigured. Despite this, he's welcomed into the group and given a costume to cover up his disfigurements.

However, after Joshua saves a crashing jet liner, two other members of Front Lines reveal that they had engineered the crash by killing the pilots to allow Joshua to gain positive PR. Meanwhile, someone has been targeting Front Line members with weapons capable of killing superhumans, with clues hinting at any number of governments angered at Front Line's past actions.

However, it's not until the climax of the story where the truth is revealed: Joshua Carver is a secret FBI operative raised since childhood by the agency after his parents were murdered by a serial killer who taught him his skills and turned him into a sociopath. Using his manipulation skills, Carver gains the trust of his targets, then assassinates them when they let him close. He reveals that the destruction of The Front Line is a joint effort by the world's governments, wanting to be rid of their interference. Carver kills the remaining members of The Front Line and flies the immortal Carrick into space before dying, but the final pages reveal that without the stabilizing influence of Front Line, the world is already beginning to descend into international chaos.

== Collected editions ==
The series has been collected into an individual volume:

- No Hero (192 pages, Avatar, January 2010, softcover, ISBN 1-59291-084-X, limited edition hardcover, ISBN 1-59291-085-8)
