= Caught Stealing (novel) =

2005 novel by Charlie Huston

- First edition cover
- Author: Charlie Huston
- Language: English
- Genre: Crime fiction
- Publication date: May 31, 2005
- Media type: Print (Hardcover, Paperback)
- Pages: 272

Caught Stealing is a crime novel by American author Charlie Huston, published on May 31, 2005 by Ballantine Books. The book is told in first-person narration by Henry “Hank” Thompson, a bartender in New York City who becomes embroiled in a struggle between several criminals. The book is the first in the Henry Thompson Series, followed by Six Bad Things and A Dangerous Man. A film adaptation of the novel was released in 2025.

== Conception ==
Huston drew on their (Note: Huston uses they/them pronouns.) experiences working as a bartender in New York when writing the book. In an interview with the Motion Picture Association, they stated: "It's a classic first novel where I used so much of my personal experience — everything up to when the guns came out." Huston also struggled with sobriety, which helped inform the protagonist's alcoholism.

== Plot ==
In 2000, Henry “Hank” Thompson works as a bartender in New York City. Growing up in California, he had been a star baseball player, with plans to play professionally. An injury, however, derailed his athletic career, and after lapsing into bad habits, he crashed a car, killing the passenger. He is now known as a nice guy in his neighborhood. When his neighbor, Russ, asks him to take care of his cat during an absence, Hank accepts.

Soon thereafter, two men inexplicably beat Hank. The injuries, combined with heavy drinking, cause Hank to lose his kidney. While recovering from surgery, he finds a key attached to the cat carrier. He notices men coming to search his apartment and hides. After the break in, the cops, including Detective Roman, take a statement from Hank. Later that night, Roman, who turns out to be a dirty cop, returns to Hank's apartment with several accomplices. They torture Hank to give up the key, but he no longer knows where it is.

Hank goes to stay with his on-and-off girlfriend, Yvonne, but he doesn't tell her the truth about his predicament. Two men, Ed and Paris, kidnap Hank outside the apartment. They threaten consequences unless he gives them the key. Hank later finds the tortured body of Yvonne. The cops take him in for questioning, but he is released by Roman.

Hank finds the key after realizing that he had accidentally thrown it out with dirty clothes. He finds Russ back at his apartment and hits him in the head with a baseball bat in a fit of rage. They both go to the storage locker associated with the key, where they find a bag with several million dollars. Russ explains that he, Roman, Ed, and Paris were all involved in stealing money from other criminals. After a big score, Russ stole the money.

Hank calls Roman to hand over the money, along with Russ, but changes his mind. He and Russ escape, but Russ dies from his head injury during their retreat. Hank calls Ed and Paris, who agree to help him set up Roman. They plan to kill Roman by baiting him with the money. Roman figures out the ruse, but Hank still manages to kill him. Afterwards, the brothers invite Hank to form a crew. Hank shoots them both, however, after they reveal that they killed Yvonne. Hank escapes to Mexico with the money.

== Adaptation ==
The filmmaker Darren Aronofsky approached Huston in 2008 about adapting the novel for the screen; however, development did not start until 2022, when Aronofsky reconsidered the idea. Using a screenplay developed by Huston, Aronofsky directed a film, also called Caught Stealing, that was released to favorable reviews in 2025, with Austin Butler playing Hank Thompson.
