= Cecimonster Vs. Donka =

Peruvian rock band

Cecimonster vs Donka
- Cecimonster vs Donka in March 2020

Background information
- Origin: Lima, Peru
- Genres: Alternative rock, indie rock, post-hardcore, post-rock
- Years active: 2010-present
- Label: A Tutiplén Records
- Members: Sergio Saba; Sebastian Kouri; Richard Gutierrez; Mario Acuña
- Website: www.cecimonstervsdonka.com

Cecimonster vs Donka is a Peruvian rock band formed on May 1, 2010, by Sergio Saba and Sebastian Kouri in Lima, Peru. As of 2026 they have 5 studio albums and 1 Extended Play: Solara in 2011, which their song Nieve Nieve won best Rock act in the Country, Adentro Afuera In 2012, from which they were nominated for the best rock act in the country by El Comercio, Empty Beaches in 2015 the band's 3rd album titled released by Anti-Rudo records, A Big House By The Lake In 2019, Delilah in 2024 with their new bassist Richard Gutierrez from El Hombre Misterioso and Adult Violence in 2026.

They have shared stages with important musicians such as Pixies, Él Mató a un Policía Motorizado, Title Fight, Japandroids, Boom Boom Kid, and Lenny Kravitz

The band's style of music contains a range of elements, including indie rock, post rock, punk rock, and post hardcore.

== Discography ==
- Solara (2011)
- Adentro Afuera (2012)
- Empty Beaches (2015)
- A Big House by the Lake (2019)
- Delilah (2024)
- Adult Violence (2026)

== Members ==
- Sergio Saba - Guitar, Vocals (2010–Present)
- Sebastian Kouri - Guitar (2010–Present)
- Richard Gutierrez - Bass Guitar (2019–Present)
- Mario Acuña - Drums (2015–Present)

== Music videos ==
- Inyecten (2011)
- Watch Me (2011)
- Nieve Nieve (2012)
- One Hundred Years (2012)
- Adentro Afuera (2014)
- Not Your Friend (2015)
- Monday (2015)
- Night Flight To MIA (2019)
- Ants (2021)
- Signing Off (2024)
- Being Nice Will Murder You (2024)
- Breathe In (2024)
- Puerto Rico (2025)

== Documentaries ==
- Cecimonster vs Donka @ Audiofobia
- Minus The Breakables London Summer Tour 2011 (teaser)
