= No Dominion =

2006 novel by Charlie Huston

- First edition
- Author: Charlie Huston
- Language: English
- Genre: Noir, Thriller, Horror
- Publisher: Del Rey
- Publication date: 26 December 2006
- Publication place: United States
- Media type: Print (Hardback & Paperback)
- Pages: 272 pp (first edition, hardback)
- ISBN: 978-0-345-47825-2 (first edition, hardback)
- OCLC: 62889135
- Dewey Decimal: 813/.6 22
- LC Class: PS3608.U855 N6 2006
- Preceded by: Already Dead
- Followed by: Half the Blood of Brooklyn

No Dominion is a 2006 pulp-noir / horror novel by American writer Charlie Huston. This book is the sequel to Already Dead and follows the life of the vampire detective, Joe Pitt. The title of the book is an allusion to the Dylan Thomas poem "And Death Shall Have No Dominion," which appears in the book.

No Dominion is the second book in the Joe Pitt Casebooks series written by Charlie Huston.

== Plot summary ==
"Vampyre Joe Pitt is down on his luck, behind on rent and low on blood. With nowhere else to turn he finds himself asking his former boss Terry Bird head of the vampyre clan the Society. Bird tosses Joe a job, tracking down the source of a new drug on the streets, a drug powerful enough to cause those infected with the Vampyre Vyrus to freak out. For this one Joe has to cross Coalition turf and head down to Harlem, home of the vampyre clan known as the Hood."

== Characters ==
This book introduces several new characters to the series, including Maureen Vandewater, the vampyre in charge of training enforcers for the Coalition, and the Count, a vampyre drug dealer.
