= Adult Violence =

EP by Cecimonster Vs. Donka
- Released: August 7, 2026
- Recorded: May 2026
- Studios: Saito Chinen Estudio, Lima, Peru
- Genre: Alternative rock
- Length: 9:27
- Language: English
- Label: A Tutiplén Records
- Producer: Saito Chinen (producer)

Cecimonster Vs. Donka chronology
| Delilah (2024) | Adult Violence (2026) |

Adult Violence is the first EP by alternative rock band Cecimonster Vs. Donka from Lima, Peru.

== Track listing ==
All tracks are written by Cecimonster vs Donka.

| No. | Title | Length |
|---|---|---|
| 1. | "Precio Rasta" | 1:59 |
| 2. | "Trash Talk" | 1:34 |
| 3. | "Los Búhos No Son Lo Que Aparentan (ft. Danitse)" | 3:52 |
| 4. | "Little Demon" | 2:02 |
| Total length: | | 9:27 |

== Personnel ==
Band members

- Sergio Saba – vocals, guitar
- Sebastian Kouri – guitar
- Richard Gutierrez – bass guitar
- Mario Acuña – Drums

Additional personnel

- Saito Chinen – Recording, mixing, mastering
- Bruno Bellatin – Arrangements, guitars on Los Búhos No Son Lo Que Aparentan
- Danitse - Vocals on Los Búhos No Son Lo Que Aparentan
- Artwork by José Antonio Mesones "Goster"
