= Delilah (Cecimonster Vs. Donka album) =

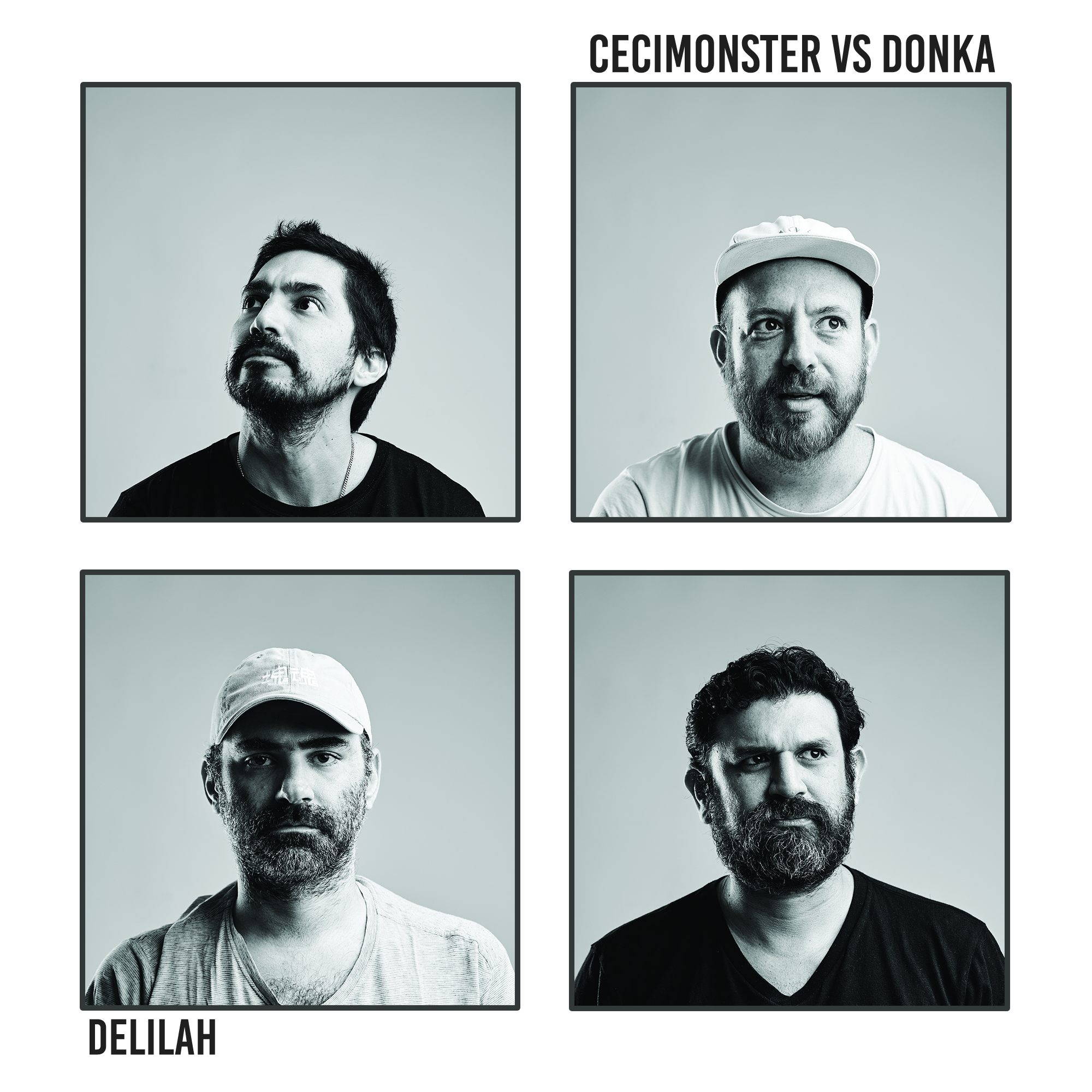

Studio album by Cecimonster Vs. Donka
- Released: August 16, 2024
- Recorded: March 2024
- Studios: Saito Chinen Estudio, Lima, Peru
- Genre: Alternative rock
- Length: 28:19
- Language: English
- Label: A Tutiplén Records
- Producer: Saito Chinen (producer)

Cecimonster Vs. Donka chronology
A Big House by the Lake (2019)	Delilah (2024)	Adult Violence (2026)

Delilah is the fifth studio album by alternative rock band Cecimonster Vs. Donka from Lima, Peru. Delilah landed on the 3rd best album of the country by renowned reviewver Raul Cachay and spot 37 on Rockachorao.com.

== Track listing ==
All tracks are written by Cecimonster Vs. Donka.

No.	Title	Length
1.	"Puerto Rico"	3:10
2.	"Breathe In"	1:43
3.	"Santa Catalina"	2:51
4.	"Being Nice Will Murder You"	1:09
5.	"Wolves"	1:19
6.	"No Help Is Coming"	3:57
7.	"Wedding Day"	3:15
8.	"Party Hat"	2:27
9.	"Signing Off"	3:23
Total length:		28:19

== Personnel ==
Band Members

- Mario Acuña – Drums
- Sergio Saba – vocals, guitar
- Sebastian Kouri – guitar
- Richard Gutierrez – bass guitar

Additional personnel

- Saito Chinen – Recording, mixing, mastering
- Bruno Bellatin – Arrangements, guitars
- Alessandro Collucceli - Arrangements
