= Juan José Ryp =

Spanish comic book artist

- Born: Juan José Rodríguez y Prieto; August 21, 1971 (age 55) Algeciras, Spain
- Areas: Penciller, Inker
- Notable works: Black Summer, Frank Miller's RoboCop, Britannia

Juan José Ryp (born Juan José Rodríguez y Prieto; born 1971) is a Spanish comic book artist. After an early start in Spanish underground comics he has gone on to provide art for all the major American comic publishers, doing extensive work for Avatar Press, DC Comics, Marvel Comics and Image Comics. He has received critical acclaim for his intricately detailed pencil work and his meticulous draftsmanship, with a focus on action and the realism of environments and anatomy. His most notable works are his dark superhero collaborations with writer Warren Ellis, Black Summer and No Hero, his adaptation of Frank Miller's original script for RoboCop 2 with writer Steven Grant and the Britannia mini-series, a horror mystery set at the age of Nero, created with writer Peter Milligan.

== Biography ==
A self-taught artist, Ryp started his professional career with a small Spanish publisher, MMM (Megamultimedia), first illustrating a fantasy comic for children and later being commissioned a few series for anthology magazine Wet Comix. His main works from this period are the erotic Lesbiación (Girls' Games), Monique y Denisse and Ignominia series and the pulpy Nancy in Hell and Bribones. When MMM shut down, Ryp stopped drawing regularly, only sporadically providing illustrations for books and magazines.

He resumed his career in 2001, when the American publishing house Avatar Press asked him to illustrate comic adaptations of the prose works of Alan Moore. He went on to provide art for the comic adaptation of Frank Miller's unused RoboCop 2 script, with writer Steven Grant, and had his first breakthrough drawing Warren Ellis' Black Summer and the second part of his Avatar superhero trilogy, No Hero. At Avatar, Ryp also illustrated several film tie-ins for classic horror franchises A Nightmare on Elm Street, The Texas Chainsaw Massacre and Friday the 13th.

After a long run of working at Avatar, in 2010 Ryp started collaborating with Marvel Comics on Vengeance of the Moon Knight and a Punisher MAX one-shot. Shortly after he was announced as the artist of the 12-issue series Wolverine: The Best There Is along with writer Charlie Huston. He went on to guest on several Bat Family titles at DC Comics, before being tapped to illustrate the 20-issue series Clone with writers David Schulner, Aaron Ginsburg and Wade McIntyre for Skybound Entertainment at Image Comics.

In 2015 Ryp was asked by ex-Marvel CEO Warren Simons to draw several titles for the relaunched Valiant Entertainment. After doing some guest work on a few Valiant series, he reunited with former Punisher collaborator and legendary writer Peter Milligan for the historical horror mystery Britannia, an experience he described as "very exciting" because it allowed him to work with new characters and put a horror spin on an unusual historical setting. The series was followed by a sequel, titled Britannia: We Who Are About to Die, with Milligan back on writing duties. Ryp continued working for Valiant until 2020, providing art for some of the best-selling series of the publisher.

In 2020 he joined the roster of newly launched ex-Marvel Editor-in-Chief Axel Alonso's publishing house AWA Studios, illustrating the second volume of the zombie action comic Year Zero with writer Benjamin Percy. The following year he rejoined ex-Valiant Editor-in-Chief Warren Simons drawing Robert Venditti's dinosaur action mini-series Tankers for ex-Valiant CEO Dinesh Shamdasani's Bad Idea.

== Bibliography ==
=== Avatar Press ===
- Alan Moore's Magic Words #1 (art, with writer Art Brooks, adapted from works by Alan Moore, 2002)
- Alan Moore's Yuggoth Cultures and Other Growths #1 (art, with writer Alan Moore, 2003)
- Alan Moore's Another Suburban Romance #1 (art, with writer Antony Johnston, adapted from the play by Alan Moore, 2003)
- Frank Miller's RoboCop #1–9 (art, with writer Steven Grant, adapted from the original script by Frank Miller, 2003–06)
- Angel Stomp Future #1 (art, with writer Warren Ellis, 2004)
- Special (one shot), with Brian Pulido (2005)
- A Nightmare on Elm Street: Paranoid #1–3 (art, with writer Brian Pulido, 2005)
- Wolfskin #1–3 (art, with writer Warren Ellis, 2006–07)
- Black Summer #0–7 (art, with writer Warren Ellis, 2007–08)
- No Hero #0–7 (art, with writer Warren Ellis, 2008–09)

=== AWA Upshot ===
- Year Zero Vol. 2 #1–5 (art, with writer Benjamin Percy, 2020–21)

=== Bad Idea ===
- Tankers #1–3 (art, with writer Robert Venditti, 2021)

=== DC Comics ===
- Batman: Arkham Unhinged #5 (art, with writer Derek Fridolfs, 2012)
- Batman: The Dark Knight #0 (art, with writer Gregg Hurwitz, 2012)
- Birds of Prey #15 (art, with writer Duane Swierczynski, 2012)
- Talon #2 (art, with writers Scott Snyder and James Tynion IV, 2012)
- Nightwing #17–18 (art, with writer Kyle Higgins, 2013)
- Legends of the Dark Knight #6 (art, with writer Rob Williams, 2013)
- Batwoman #38 (art, with writer Marc Andreyko, 2015)
- Batman and Robin Annual #3 (art, with writer Peter Tomasi, 2015)

=== Image Comics ===
- Clone #1–20 (art, with writer David Schulner, 2012–14)
- Ghosted #16 (art, with writer Joshua Williamson, 2015)

=== Marvel Comics ===
- Vengeance of the Moon Knight #9–10 (art, with writer Gregg Hurwitz, 2010)
- Punisher MAX: Happy Ending (art, with writer Peter Milligan, 2010)
- Wolverine: The Best There Is #1–12 (art, with writer Charlie Huston, 2011–12)
- Siege: Battleworld #3 (art, with writer Kieron Gillen, 2015)
- Wolverine (6th series) #26-35, 37-39 (art, with writer Benjamin Percy, 2022–23
- Wolverine: Blood Hunt #1-4 (art, with writer Tom Waltz, 2024)

=== Valiant Entertainment ===
- Book of Death: Legends of the Geomancer #1–4 (art, with writer Fred Van Lente, 2015)
- Ninjak #7–13 (art, with writer Matt Kindt, 2015–16)
- Britannia #1–4 (art, with writer Peter Milligan, 2016)
- Harbinger: Renegade #0–4, 6 (art, with writer Rafer Roberts, 2016–17)
- Britannia: We Who Are About to Die #1–4 (art, with writer Peter Milligan, 2017)
- Rapture #4 (art, with writer Matt Kindt, 2017)
- Ninja-K #6–9 (art, with writer Christos Gage, 2018)
- X-O Manowar #19–22 (art, with writer Matt Kindt, 2018)
- Rai #1–10 (art, with writer Dan Abnett, 2019–20)
