= Mini Marvels =

Comic book

Publication information
- Publisher: Marvel Comics
- Genre: Humor/comedy, superhero
- Main characters: Marvel Characters

Creative team
- Written by: Chris Giarrusso; Marc Sumerak; Sean McKeever; Audrey Loeb; Paul Tobin
- Artist: Chris Giarrusso
- Letterer: Chris Giarrusso
- Colorist: Chris Giarusso
- Editor: Nathan Cosby

Mini Marvels is an all-ages comic book written and illustrated by Chris Giarrusso and published by Marvel Comics. The comic has been published in the form of back-ups in other comic books as well as original one-shots and trade paperback collections. The comics are a humorous depiction of the Marvel heroes as children of various ages, sometimes parodying storylines from the mainstream Marvel universe.

== Bullpen Bits ==
The Mini Marvels were originally in a comic strip called "Bullpen Bits", published in Bullpen Bulletins. They now can be viewed in several Mini Marvels trade paperbacks.

== Running Gags ==
- Neither Aunt May or J. Jonah Jameson ever notice that Peter Parker is Spider-Man, despite him always wearing his costume and using his powers around them.
- Hawkeye often complains about being in Captain America's shadow.
  - Additionally, other characters don’t take Hawkeye seriously as a superhero.
- Hulk, Red Hulk, and original character Blue Hulk, often get into various adventures.
- Daredevil is always facing the wrong direction.

== Collections ==
- Giant-Size Mini Marvels #1 - "Paperboy Blues" and a collection of "Bullpen Bits"
- Spidey and the Mini Marvels #1 - "Paperboy Showdown" and "Cereal Quest"
- Mini Marvels Volume 1: Rock, Paper, Scissors - All comics from the above two collections, plus several other stories
- Mini Marvels Volume 2: Secret Invasion - More stories and "Bullpen Bits" by Giarrusso, as well as a few stories written by others
- Mini Marvels: Ultimate Collection - All the stories from Volumes 1 and 2, Five new stories, and a complete collection of Bullpen Bits
