= Black Summer =

Comic book by Warren Ellis

Publication information
- Publisher: Avatar Press
- Schedule: Monthly
- Format: Limited series
- Genre: Superhero
- Publication date: May 2007 – July 2008
- No. of issues: 8

Creative team
- Written by: Warren Ellis
- Artist(s): Juan Jose Ryp
- Colorist(s): Mark Sweeney
- Editor(s): William A. Christensen

Collected editions
- Hardcover: ISBN 1-59291-053-X
- Softcover: ISBN 1592910521

Black Summer is a comic book limited series written by Warren Ellis, illustrated by Juan Jose Ryp, and published by American company Avatar Press starting in June 2007. The plot revolves around the consequences of a superhero, John Horus, who kills the President of the United States and several of his advisers after discovering them to be war criminals. The following seven issues detail the aftermath of the assassination.

Black Summer is regarded as the first series in Warren Ellis's Avatar-published "Superhuman Trilogy" dealing with the creation of superheroes, the subsequent series being No Hero and Supergod. Prior to Supergod's release, Warren Ellis said in an interview that, "Black Summer was about superhumans who were too human. No Hero was about superhumans who were inhuman. Supergod is about superhumans who are no longer human at all, but something else. The third leg of a thematic trilogy if you like."

== Plot synopsis ==
The Seven Guns, led by scientist-inventor Tom Noir, are a posthuman superhero team who have made a reputation for opposing corrupt political institutions. John Horus, the strongest member of the team, assassinates the President of the United States for his allegedly criminal policies, telling the nation that he was the only person in a position to stop him. As martial law is declared, Frank Blacksmith, once Tom's partner and the co-founder of the Seven Guns — having previously faked his death to work for the CIA — comes out of hiding to hunt down and eliminate Tom and the Guns.

The remaining Guns, all branded as fugitives by the government, try to cope with the aftermath of the assassination while trying to keep internal tensions from boiling over. After Tom is killed in a battle with the U.S. military, the Guns furiously massacre the soldiers and resolve to kill John Horus. Horus, having repelled attacks from fighter jets and a nuclear missile, threatens to destroy the country in retaliation for Tom's death. Frank Blacksmith is given approval to unleash his covert "Tactical Stream" of super soldiers, which engage the Guns at their old base.

=== Issue 6 ===
The battle between the remaining Four Guns and Frank Blacksmith's Tactical Stream is underway. One of them strikes down Dom and kills him, saying "Frank Blacksmith says hello, you piece of shit". Meanwhile, John starts razing the base but the general stands down his troops in order both to save their lives and to get John talking. He convinces John that Tom had died by suicide and not at the hands of his troops. He and his troops are then killed in a massive surprise Tactical Stream attack on John which destroys even more of the city. Zoe, Kathryn and Angela have managed to dispose of their assailants and witness the mushroom cloud explosion of the attack on John.

=== Issue 7 ===
John Horus fends off his attackers despite the loss of several of his "eyes". The three women of the team interrupt them, telling both John and the Tactical Stream that they're banished from the city when done fighting. They then resolve to stay out of any further conflict but devote themselves to saving the lives of survivors in the largely ruined city. John eliminates the remainder of his attackers and leaves to find Blacksmith at Laura Tarrant's grave, which has been disturbed. They argue over who disturbed it and who is the true hero. Tom Noir reveals himself, alive and well ("I'm not as fast as Zoe, but I'm still pretty fast") taking both men to task for "fucking it up" and ruining the original dream of the Seven Guns. He reveals that he dug up Laura's grave for her gun and activates a failsafe which he had included in it at Laura's request, killing them all in a massive blast. As the smoke clears a prerecorded message, one which Tom Noir had set to broadcast while waiting for the meeting ("waiting here to kill my oldest friend"), airs over every radio in the country, giving Tom's version of events, exonerating (as much as possible) the surviving Guns and promising, as the book ends, to elaborate on Frank Blacksmith's story and give comprehensive evidence of unspecified "war crimes committed by our government." Before proceeding with these, Tom closes the book out with his explanation that John had to be killed "because he cared too much about saving the day."

== Main characters ==
=== Kathryn Artemis ===
Before her enhancements, Kathryn was a world-class athlete and marksman. She customised her enhancements by incorporating her motorcycle into the transformation, becoming an armoured motorcyclist. Unlike the other members, her background was in history rather than science, and she felt no qualms about killing criminals. Her Gun appears capable of firing scattered bursts that destroy multiple targets. Her keyword, Miyamoto, is the Japanese surname of Miyamoto Musashi.

=== John Horus ===
The most well known and publicly active member of the Seven Guns, Horus is also the most powerful. Until he killed the president and everyone in the Oval Office, he was the most publicly trusted member of the team, and was often a guest of the President. John benefits from the enhancements pioneered by the other Guns: Blacksmith's offensive gun, Angela's flight system, and Tom Noir's baseline augmentations. John's personal contribution was a customisation of his Gun. Instead of a handgun-shaped weapon attachment, his Gun is a swarm of eye-shaped floating devices that function as an offensive and defensive weapons platform, making him virtually invincible. The eyes have shown the capacity to withstand several nuclear payloads, and Tom Noir says that Horus "could build cities out of mud" with his enhancements. He dresses in white clothes that resemble an officer's outfit from the US Civil War, but with Masonic symbols, or Eye of Ra sigils. He also carries on an Ellis trademark, a reluctant hero who wears all white (see Jenny Sparks and Elijah Snow). Keyword unknown.

=== Dominic Atlas Hyde ===
The muscle of the team. At the time of the events of the series, Dominic has assumed the duties of mechanic, maintaining the team's equipment. Dominic possesses various implants allowing him to remotely control the team's computer equipment in addition to the baseline augmentations. When activated, his enhancements utilise "smart fullerene" to cover his body in massive black body armour and artificial muscle mass. His keyword, Herakles, refers to the legendary demigod.

=== Zoe Jump ===
Zoe uses the Millis Bias Field to distort physical laws, giving her superhuman speed. Zoe theorised that if she could mentally encompass, in one instant, the complex mathematical equations describing such a Field, she could project such a field around herself. With help from Tom Noir, she created and installed cybernetic eye implants to project the information onto her field of vision. She is able to extend the field around herself to a limited degree, so that a single person running in tandem with her can achieve the same speed. Zoe shows serious misgivings regarding the use of lethal force.

=== Tom Noir ===
Real Name: Tom Watson. Considered the "brains" of the Seven Guns, Tom Noir helped theorise the Gun technology that would empower the group. He worked closely with Frank Blacksmith to develop the Guns. Tom's Gun enhancements include a "supercortex" that allows him to perceive and process all available information streams, including decryption, and very precise ultrasound imaging technology. He is able to see directly into any target with surgical precision through outer layers of clothing, weapons, devices, as well as bones and internal organs. This vision also allows him to find vital points and weaknesses. His Gun is named Inquiry, and fires surgical tungsten rounds that can penetrate a tank. Tom also covers his right arm in some kind of techno-organic looking armour while fighting the government assassin sent to kill him. Keyword: Bakerstreet. The keyword is an allusion to Sherlock Holmes, the fictional detective whose address in London was 221b Baker Street. His Gun, Inquiry, also follows in this motif, alluding to Holmes's inquisitive mind, and fitting of Watson's role as the "brains" of the group.

More than a year ago, Tom lost part of his left leg below the knee in the explosion that killed Laura Tarrant. After her death, Tom quit the group and became an alcoholic shut-in, living in a squalid apartment and drinking himself to death. Despite this, he was targeted first for termination after Horus' execution of the President. Frank Blacksmith believes that his genius-level intellect, which helped create the Gun technology Blacksmith now uses to empower his government agents, makes him, out of all his teammates, the most dangerous potential asset for John Horus.

=== Angel One ===
Angel One, real name Angela, can levitate and 'fly' by superconductor based magnetic levitation using systems surgically implanted in her legs, and possibly other parts of her torso. The effect works better in highly metallic environments, so better in urban areas than rural or wilderness. A Keyword, Daedalus, which refers to the Greek myth of Daedalus the inventor who constructed, among other things, wings of wood and wax to escape imprisonment on Crete with his son Icarus (who died upon flying too close of the sun, melting the wax of his wings).

=== Laura Torch ===
In civilian life, her name was Laura Tarrant. Although deceased by the time of the story's events, Laura has played a pivotal role in the current state of the team. A caring and compassionate person, she had worried that the power which the group wielded would one day be misused, and had asked her boyfriend, Tom Noir, to make sure her gun never fell into the wrong hands, and also to make it powerful enough to destroy her and her teammates if needed for the general good. Laura was killed by the same car bomb that destroyed Tom's leg, driving Tom to leave the team and hit the bottle. Unlike the other team members Laura does not appear even in flashbacks, and there is no description of her enhancements, save that early in the story Dominic mentions that the sheer power of her gun, which Noir has in fact hidden in her grave, scares even him. Her Gun reappears in the story's climax, functioning in the story as a Chekhov's gun, and "Laura" is Noir's last word before activating it to kill himself, John Horus, and Frank Blacksmith. Her keyword is never revealed.

=== Frank Blacksmith ===
Mentor to the Seven Guns and designer of the external gun attachment that the group utilised in their crime-fighting. The team witnessed Frank's apparent death at the hands of crooked cops years earlier. However, John Horus' actions have brought Frank out of hiding. Struck by the danger the team could pose, he had faked his own death to work on countermeasures for the government. He is convinced he is saving the world from them. In the intervening years, he has improved upon the technology within the Seven Guns and assembled both operational and covert-ops tactical teams of new model gun soldiers, the latter in secret. Assigning a soldier to kill Tom, he comes along personally to apologise for the necessity of the killing, and for the unintended murder, during an earlier attempted hit on Tom, of Laura Tarrant for whom Frank had felt sincere fondness.

== Collected editions ==
The series has been collected into softcover and hardcover volumes:

- Black Summer (192 pages, September 2008, softcover, ISBN 1-59291-052-1, hardcover, ISBN 1-59291-053-X)

== Film adaptation ==
The series has been optioned by Vigilante Entertainment, a newly created company started by Hicham Benkirane, who had previously developed comic books for other media at Les Humanoïdes Associés.
