= Felix Serrano =

American comics artist

Felix Serrano is a professional comic book colourist. He began his career in 1998 working for Marvel Comics in their title Generation X. The same year, his first work for DC Comics was published in the title JLA Secret Files. He also worked for some Batman Titles until the early 2000s.

Most recently he has been working for IDW Publishing, Image Comics and Marvel Comics.
