= The Art(e) of Romance =

Art(e) of Romance
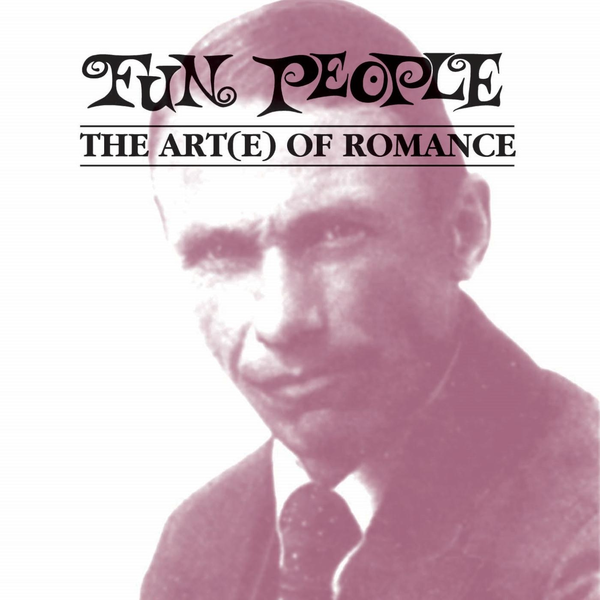
- Kurt Gustav Wilckens, an anarchist killed in 1923, appears on the cover.

Studio album by Fun People
- Released: 1999
- Recorded: 1999
- Genres: Melodic hardcore, hardcore punk
- Label: Ugly Records
- Producer: Steve Albini

Fun People chronology
Ramos Mejía (1999)	Art(e) of Romance (1999)	Angustia, No, No

The Art(e) of Romance is the fifth studio album of Argentine melodic hardcore band Fun People, issued by Ugly Records in April 1999.

== Track listing ==
1. "Take Over"
2. "Middle of the Round"
3. "F.M.S."
4. "What Will We Gonna Pay?"
5. "Leave Me Alone"
6. "Dick Dale"
7. "Si Pudieras (Desde Ushuaia)"
8. "Water"
9. "One Day, Like Wilckens"
10. "Vivar"
11. "Vientos"
12. "Question"
13. "Diciembre"
14. "Donde Estás?"
15. "Never Knows (Es Obvio)"
16. "Blah, Blah, Blah"
17. "Sardina" (Instrumental)
18. "A Mi Manera"
19. "El Stranger"

== Personnel ==
- Recorded and mixed in Chicago, Illinois, by Steve Albini at Electrical Studio
- Mastered by J. Golden Studios, Hollywood, California
- Mr. Chuly Pogiese – bass
- Lord Nano and William – caños
- Gori – guitars
- Gato – drums
- Miss Muerte – singer
- Emi Ron – spiritual guide
