= Anesthesia (album) =

Studio album by Fun People
- Released: 1995
- Studios: Tecson, Del Abasto al pasto
- Genres: Hardcore; Argentinian rock Melodic hardcore
- Length: 52:16 (Ugly Records version)
- Labels: Frost Bite, Ugly Records

Fun People chronology
Anesthesia (1995)	Kum Kum (1996)

Anesthesia is Fun People's debut album, first released on Frost Bite in 1995 and then edited by Ugly Records.

== Background ==
Fun People had originally planned to name themselves "Anesthesia" but were unable to do so because a different group was already using the name. Instead, the group settled for using it as the name of their first album.

== Track listing ==
1. "Ánimo"
2. "Estoy (a tu lado)"
3. "Submerge your senses into the black"
4. "Marionetas"
5. "Runaway"
6. "Hunt"
7. "1978 (Camps days)"
8. "Dear"
9. "Anabelle"
10. "FMI"
11. "Boicot antinatural"
12. "Mantiene tu espíritu con humor"
13. "Bad influence"
14. "Break your obsessions"
15. "Vivisección"
16. "Distinto"
17. "Jailed"
18. "Give you help"
19. "Mi vida"
20. "Lemon pie"
21. "Eres ciego"
22. "Shaggy mi querido amigo en peligro"
23. "Searching my lucky again"
24. "About me"
25. "Helter skelter"
26. "NY city clon"
27. "Sin color"
28. "Cada vez más"
29. "When the sun"
30. "Valor interior"
31. "Rain"

Recorded and Mixed by Marcelo Depetro.
