= Fun People =

Argentine hardcore band

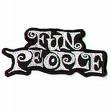

Background information
- Also known as: Anesthesia (1989–1995)
- Origin: Campana, Argentina
- Genres: Hardcore punk • melodic hardcore • post-hardcore • pop punk • skate punk • anarcho-punk • indie rock • emo • crossover thrash (early)
- Years active: 1989–2001, 2003, 2005, 2010, 2013
- Labels: Ugly, Frost Bite
- Members: Boom Boom Kid; Carlos Loncharich; Dario Lopez; Marcelo Vidal
- Past members: Jhonathan Scarcha; Lucas Sequeira; Julián Pugliese; Sebastian Garay
- Website: http://www.funpeople.com.ar

Fun People was a hardcore band from Argentina. Their lyrics were in English and Spanish, often mixing both languages in a single song or even line. Human and animal rights are frequent subjects in their lyrics. The band mixes punk music with other genres such as reggae, pop, tango, thrash metal and others.

As the band became well known, skinheads who enjoyed the band's aggressive music in a violent way started to show up at concerts, prompting singer Nekro to call the band's genre "anti-fascist gay hardcore" in an attempt to get rid of those fans. For this reason, Fun People is sometimes confused as queercore.

== History ==
Early on, the band was called Anesthesia (as a tribute to Cliff Burton). When the band was about to release their first album, planned to be self-titled, they found out someone else had already copyrighted Anesthesia as a band name. Fun People, the name of a fanzine Nekro made and sold at the band's concerts, was chosen as the band's new name and Anesthesia remained as the album's title.

Fun People was at its inception was within the hardcore and punk genres, with an occasional tendency to grindcore, but also sometimes played melodic hardcore (Play "Anesthesia", her first album). Its second album includes thrash metal, ska, a pop song, reggae, rock. The third album by Fun People is more hardcore, but includes a ballad ("Point Of Lovely Sun") and a folk song ("Rainbow"). The fourth album is "The Art (e) of Romance", recorded and produced by Steve Albini, known for his work with Page / Plant, Nirvana and The Pixies, recorded entirely in United States.

The latest album under the name of Fun People is titled "Sorrow, No, No".

Apart from studio albums, the band has published several EPs, such as "The Fun People Experience".

In its 5 years (1995-2000) of activity, Fun People released 5 studio albums, a disc with demos and excerpts from concerts (one radial acoustic and electric in the city of Chicago) and with the inclusion of 2 covers, a couple of singles, a 6-song EP and an album with all acoustic versions of "golden hits" from the band ("Gori & Nekro - Golden Hits") .

Fun People performed for the last time in a surprise show (that was not announced in the media) for fans that found out about this gig through internet and other means, approx. 9 years ago.

They remain widely admired by people in the Hardcore music scene, despite being criticized by many other HC bands for their general anti macho attitude, which is common in the scene.

=== Aftermath and reunions ===
Jhonathan Scarcha left the band again and Nekro got fully involved in his new soloist project, Boom Boom Kid. Pelado and Chelo accompany him to present day. Lucas Sequeira began fronting for Cucsifae since his departure from Fun People in 97. Gori now fronts Fantasmagoria. Chuli played for a while in Satan Dealers while Gato is currently playing in a Spanish Band called Phogo. Fun People got reunited in three different occasions, although they never announce themselves officially, letting people learn about the reunion by word of mouth. The first reunion was in 2003, at Trivenchi Shed. The line-up consisted of Nekro, Gori, Jhonathan, Pelado and Chelo. They played twice in the same night due to the great call. The second reunion was in 2005, the gig was announced as a Boom Boom Kid show but Gori showed up and they reviewed songs of their old band. Finally, their last reunion was in 2010. According to Nekro, he was planning to do something with Gori when they decided spontaneously to go on a summer tour. The band is temporarily inactive.

== Line-up ==
=== Last Line-up ===
- Carlos "Nekro" Rodriguez – lead vocals (1989–2001, 2003, 2005, 2010, 2013)
- Carlos "Gori" Loncharich – guitars (1997–2000, 2003, 2005, 2010, 2013)
- Darío "Pelado" Lopez – bass (1999–2001, 2003, 2005, 2010, 2013)
- Marcelo "Chelo" Vidal – drums (1999–2001, 2003, 2005, 2010, 2013)

=== Past members ===
- Marcelo "Cape" Capettini – guitars (1989–1990, one show 1995)
- Fabian Vichigoy – guitars (1990)
- Jhonathan Scarcha – guitars (1990–1995, 2001, one show 2003)
- Lucas Sequeira – guitars (1995–1997)
- Gus Pepa – bass (1989–1992, one show 1995)
- Marcelo "La Vieja" – bass (1992–1993)
- Julián "Chuli" Pugliese – bass (1993–1999)
- Blacky – drums, backing vocals (1989–1993, 1994, one show 1995)
- Gustavo – drums (1993–1994)
- Mariano – drums (1994–1995)
- Sebastián "Gato" Garay – drums (1995–1999)

== Discography ==
Studio albums

- Anesthesia (1995, Frost Bite)
- Kum-Kum (1996, Frost Bite)
- Toda Niño Sensible Sabrá De Que Estamos Hablando (1997, Ugly)
- The Art(e) Of Romance (1999, Ugly)
- Angustia, No, No (2000, Ugly)

Singles

- "Leave Me Alone" CD (1999, Ugly)
- "Middle Of The Rounds" CD (1999, Ugly)
- "...Shhh Only My Cat Me Comprende" 7" (2000, Saege)
- "Scooter Brigade" CD (2000, self-released)
- "Anabelle / A Jonathan Tributo" (2019)
- "Masticar / She Runaway" 7" (2021, Ugly) – with Boom Boom Kid, also called I.
- "Si Pudiera / I Do" 7" (2021, Ugly) – with Boom Boom Kid, also called II.
- "Spiritu Del 77 / Cuando Se Alinee Los Planetas" 7" (2021, Ugly) – with Boom Boom Kid, also called III.
- "Papa’s Joey Bongo Mambo Club / Persecucion" 7" (2023, Ugly) – also called Angustia No, No – Flexi Lost Tracks.

EPs and splits

- Desarme (1996, Frost Bite)
- El Aborto Illegal Asesina Mi Libertad 7" (1997, Ugly) – with She Devils
- The Fun People Experience (1998, Ugly)

Compilations

- Desarme y Sabores (1998, Ugly)
- Fun People (1999, Riot)
- Grandes Sonrisas 1995 – 1998 (1999, Mundano)
- Adios, Adios, Dust Bunnies (1999, DBN Chile Ltda)
- The Portrait Of Sudamerican Sun Rockers 12" (2000, Sacro K-Baalismo/Ugly)
- The Crossover Sudamerican Histories Of De Duck-oö-Homo (2000, Snuffy Smile)
- Otros Callan (2003, Beat Generation)
- The Never Ending Story Of A Third World Band (2016, self-released)

VHS

- Cuando Cae El Sol (1996, Profane Existence) – released as a compilation tape by De La Fae Records (2023).

Live bootleg albums

- Arlequines 23-09-95 (1995)
- Pinguilandia (1997)
- Panoramix "98 (1998)
- Cemento 06-12-98 (1998)
- Cemento 27-03-99 (1999)
- Ramos Mejía 19-03-99 (1999)

Other releases

- Anesthesia (1991, self-released) – as Anesthesia, re-released on tape by Ugly Records (2016).
- Golden Hits 10" (1999, Ugly) – as Gori & Nekro.
- Es Asunto Nuestro 7" (2016, Inocencia) – as Anesthesia.

== See also ==
- Argentine punk
