= Chris Giarrusso =

American graphic novel author and illustrator

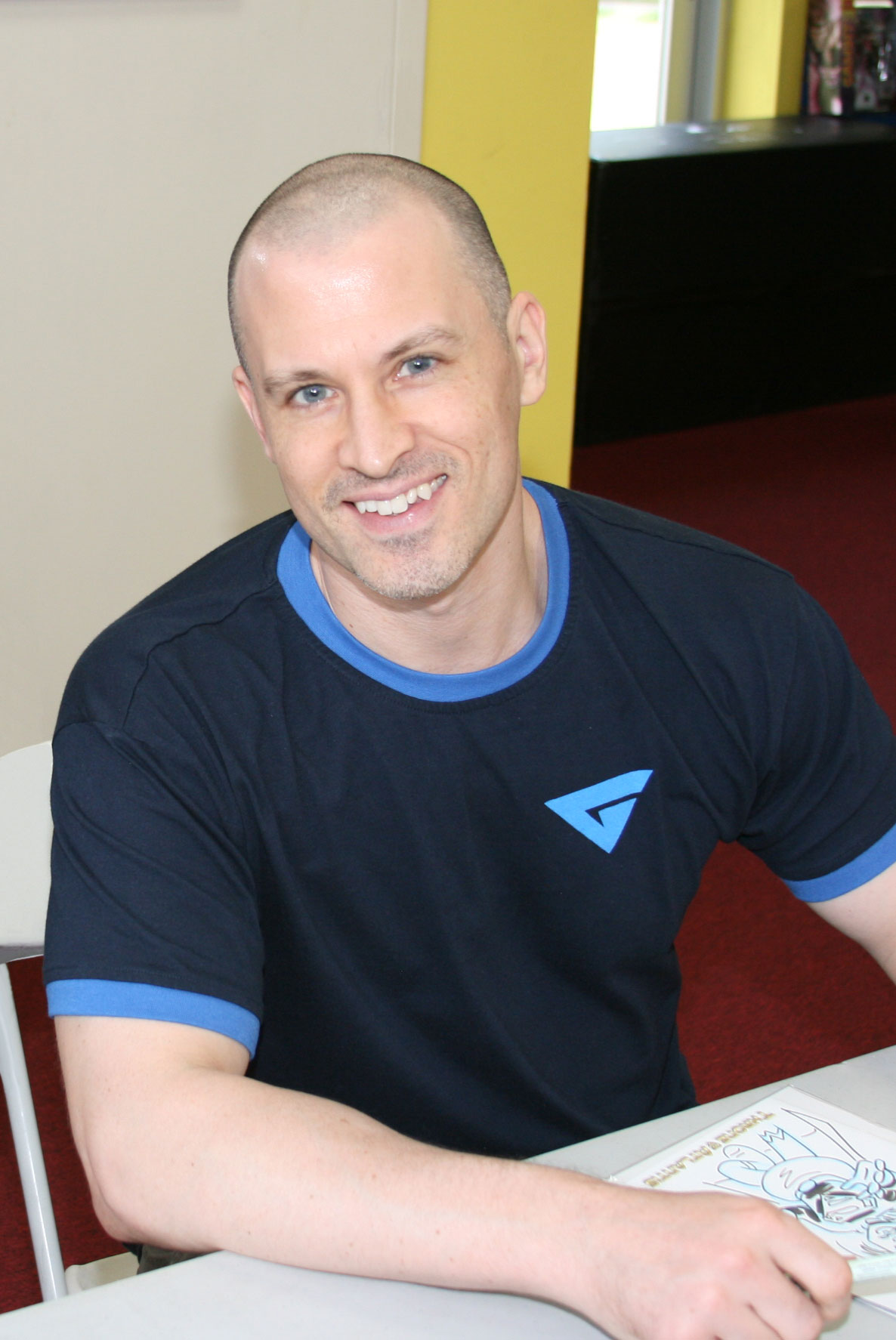
- Giarrusso at Ultimate Comics in Durham, North Carolina, 4 August 2013
- Areas: Writer, Penciller, Inker, Letterer, Colourist
- Notable works: G-Man; Mini Marvels

Chris Giarrusso is an American graphic novel author/illustrator best known for the all-ages series G-Man at Image Comics and Andrews McMeel Publishing and Mini Marvels at Marvel Comics.

== Early life ==
Chris Giarrusso is a native of Upstate New York, and comes from an artistic family. His mother actively pursued arts and crafts as a pastime, his father enjoys photography, his brother Matt is a musician, and his older brother Dave, like Giarrusso himself, enjoys drawing. Giarrusso looked up to Dave in particular, and names him as the primary creative influence on his art style and career. As a child, Giarrusso, a fan of Marvel Comics, would go to a comics shop every weekend with his mother, although his father was not as pleased with his son's choice of reading material. Giarrusso also enjoyed drawing, but did so intermittently, because he lacked confidence in his abilities, often becoming frustrated with his work and destroying his drawings. He was also influenced by the newspaper strips he and his brother read, most notably Charles Schultz's Peanuts. Others included Garfield, B.C., For Better or For Worse, Heathcliff, Marmaduke, Dennis the Menace and Beetle Bailey. His first comic book was Transformers, which he began reading when he was 9 or 10 years old.

== Career ==
Giarrusso created the all-ages Mini Marvels in 1999 for Marvel Comics, which star child-sized versions of notable Marvel characters. Mini Marvels eventually became a regular feature of Bullpen Bulletins pages seen in nearly every Marvel book. The first Mini Marvels digest, Mini Marvels: Rock, Paper Scissors, was released in July 2008, and after selling out, required a second printing.

Giarrusso is also known for writing and illustrating G-Man, an all-ages series by Image Comics featuring a young superhero who gains the powers of super strength, super endurance, and flight when he wears a magic cape. The series has been collected in two volumes, G-Man, Volume 1: Learning to Fly and G-Man, Volume 2: Cape Crisis. The series, which has been characterized by the Los Angeles Times as "Jack Kirby meets Charles Schulz", was conceived by Giarrusso when he was in high school, around the time of Image Comics' formation. G-Man and the other characters in the story are heavily inspired by Giarrusso and the experiences of his youth, and the main character's name is the nickname Giarrusso's friends gave him in high school.

== Bibliography ==
- Giant Size Mini Marvels one-shot (48 page single-issue comic, December 2001, Marvel Comics)
- Spidey and the Mini Marvels one-shot (32 page single-issue comic, April 2003, Marvel Comics)
- G-Man one-shot (64 page single issue comic, December 2004, Image Comics)
- Mini Marvels: Rock, Paper, Scissors digest collection (96 pages, August 2008, Marvel Comics)
- Mini Marvels: Secret Invasion digest collection (96 pages, February 2009, Marvel Comics)
- G-Man: Cape Crisis mini series (Five 32-page comics, August 2009 - January 2010, Image Comics)
- Mini Marvels Ultimate Collection graphic novel collection (216 pages, December 2009, Marvel Comics, ISBN 978-0-7851-4284-3)
- G-Man: Volume 1: Learning to Fly graphic novel collection (96 pages, October 2010, Image Comics, ISBN 978-1-60706-270-7)
- G-Man: Volume 2: Cape Crisis graphic novel collection (128 pages, October 2010, Image Comics, ISBN 978-1-60706-271-4)
- G-Man: Volume 3: Coming Home graphic novel collection (May 2013, Image Comics)
