= Shrapnel (Radical Comics) =

American comic book series by Mark Long and Nick Sagan

- Created by: Mark Long; Nick Sagan

Publication information
- Publisher: Radical Comics
- Schedule: Monthly
- Title(s): Aristeia Rising 1–5, Hubris 1–3
- Formats: Original material for the series has been published as a set of limited series.
- Genre: Military science fiction
- Publication date: 2009–2010
- Number of issues: 6
- Main character(s): Samantha “Sam” Vijaya

Creative team
- Writer(s): M. Zachary Sherman
- Artist(s): Bagus Hutomo
- Letterer(s): Sean Konot
- Colorist(s): Leos Ng
- Editor(s): Jim Demonakos

Reprints
- Collected editions
- Aristeia Rising: ISBN 1-935417-01-0
- Hubris: ISBN 978-1935417378

Shrapnel is an American military science fiction limited comic book series published by Radical Comics in collaboration with Zombie Studios. The story was created and plotted by Mark Long and Nick Sagan, the final script was written by M. Zachary Sherman, and the art is provided by Bagus Hutomo based on designs by Kai.

== Publication history ==
The first series, Shrapnel: Aristeia Rising, consisting of five issues, ran from January to May 2009. The second series, Shrapnel: Hubris, consisting of three issues, was published in 2010.

== Plot synopsis ==
=== Aristeia Rising ===
Aristeia Rising, the first of the three comics, takes place in the "far future" where the "Solar Alliance" has colonized nearly all of the Solar System. The Solar Alliance is the dominant presence of humanity and has taken control by force and brutality. A rebellion on Venus, the last free planet, has been formed but is on the brink of losing the war against the Alliance. Samantha “Sam” Vijaya, a war hero who took exile on Venus, soon realizes the threat against the rebels and is faced with the choice of fleeing or helping them to fight back and keep their freedom. She is inevitably forced to team up with the rebels and combat the Alliance. With her previous experience, she teaches them to fight back and leads the uprising against the Solar Alliance.

== Collected editions ==
The series were also published as trade paperbacks published by Radical Comics:

- Shrapnel: Aristeia Rising (184 pages, September 15, 2009, ISBN 1-935417-01-0)
- Shrapnel: Hubris (184 pages, 2010, ISBN 978-1935417378)

== Film adaptation ==
In July 2009, Len Wiseman has been attached to direct and produce a film adaptation, but dropped out. In July 2011, Hilary Swank will star and produce the movie with Sean Daniel and Radical Pictures from a script by Toby Wagstaff.
