= Fantasmagoria =

Argentine rock band

Fantasmagoria is an Argentine rock band, which features Gori (Fun People and Ratones Paranoicos) on vocals and acoustic guitar, Mariano Acosta (a.k.a. Acostadetodo) on vocals and keyboards, Agustin Rocino (from Catupecu Machu) on drums, and Nicolas Molyna on bass guitar.

The band was formed in Argentina in 2000 when Gori left hardcore punk rock band Fun People and began working on his own project. He replaced the harsh sound of his electric guitar with an acoustic one, giving the group its distinctive sound.

Fantasmagoria currently has two EPs, called "Fantasmagoria" and "Clearance", and five albums, from 2001 to 2018, entitled "Atravesando el camino (que nos lleva a los otros caminos)", "Abracadabra", "El Rio", "El Mago Mandrax" and a cover songs album called "Todas las canciones son del viento" respectively. In 2020 they released an EP with songs such as "Carton Lleno", "Vi algunas cosas" and "Home Studio". They are currently recording a new full album with a new concept to be released in 2021 celebrating 20 years as a band.
