= List of Wildstorm titles =

List of comics published by WildStorm

WildStorm started publishing comics in 1992. Since then, they have published an increasing number of titles, both in the Wildstorm fictional universe and in various creator-owned titles.

Under the most recent sub-imprint structure, all Cliffhanger and Homage Studios titles were published under the Wildstorm Signature Series sub-imprint, all WildStorm properties were published under the Wildstorm Universe sub-imprint, and all licensed properties were published through the Wildstorm sub-imprint.

However, in August 2006, WildStorm dropped all sub-imprints in order to simplify the line for retailers and customers, consolidating their output under a single "Wildstorm" label.

== Publications with Image Comics ==
Title	Series	Issues	Dates	Notes	Reference
Crimson		#1-7	May – Dec 1998	Limited series; partially under the Cliffhanger! imprint.	
Danger Girl		#1-4	Mar – Dec 1998	Limited series; partially under the Cliffhanger! imprint.	
Grifter and the Mask		#1–2	Sep – Oct 1996	Limited series; co-published with Dark Horse Comics	
Team One	StormWatch	#1–2	Jun – Aug 1995	Limited series	
Team One	WildC.A.T.s	#1–2	Jul – Aug 1995	Limited series	

== Publications at DC Comics ==
Title	Series	Issues	Dates	Notes	Reference
21 Down		#1–12	Nov 2002 – Nov 2003	Limited series	
Albion		#1–6	Aug 2005 – Nov 2006	Limited series	
A God Somewhere		–	June 2010	Graphic novel	
American Gothic					
The American Way		#1-8	April – Nov. 2006	Limited series	
Astro City: The Dark Age	vol. 1	#1–4	Aug – Nov 2005	Limited series	
Astro City: The Dark Age	vol. 2	#1–4	Jan – Sep 2007	Limited series	
Astro City: The Dark Age Special		#2	Feb 2008		
Astro City: Samaritan		#1	Sep 2006		
Astro City Special: Supersonic		#1	Oct 2004		
Allegra		#1–4	Aug – Dec 1996	Limited series; published under the Image Comics imprint.	
The Authority	vol. 1	#1–29	May 1999 – July 2002	Ongoing series	
The Authority	vol. 2	#1–4, 0, 5–14	Oct 2003 – Oct 2004	Ongoing series	
The Authority	vol. 3	#1–2	Dec 2006 – May 2007	Limited series	
The Authority	vol. 4	#1–29	Oct. 2008 – Jan. 2011	Ongoing series	
The Authority	Kev	#1	Oct 2002	One-shot	
The Authority	More Kev	#1–4	Jul – Dec 2004	Limited series	
The Authority	Prime	#1–6	Oct 2007 – Feb.^ 2008	Limited series	
The Authority	Revolution	#1–12	Dec 2004 – Dec 2005	Limited series	
The Authority	Scorched Earth	#1	Feb 2003	One-shot	
The Authority	The Magnificent Kevin	#1–5	Nov 2005 – Feb 2006	Limited series	
The Authority/Lobo: Spring Break Massacre		#1	Aug. 2005	One-shot	
Automatic Kafka		#1-9	Sept. 2002 – July 2003	Limited series	
Backlash		#1-32	Nov. 1994 – May 1997	Published under the Image Comics imprint.	
Batman/Deathblow: After the Fire		#1–3	Mar 2002 – Aug 2002	Limited series	
Battle of the Planets/ThunderCats		#1	May 2003	One-shot; co-published with Top Cow Productions, followed by the similarly titled Battle of the Planets/ThunderCats (July 2003).	
Black Ops		#1-5	Jan. – June 1996	Published under the Image Comics imprint.	
Black Sun		#1-6	Nov. 2002 – June 2003	Limited series	
The Boys		#1–6	Oct 2006 – Feb 2007	Published by Dynamite Entertainment from issue #7 on.	
Brass		#1-6	Aug 2000 – Jan 2001	Limited series	
Captain Atom: Armageddon		#1-9	Dec 2005 – Aug 2006	Limited series	
Casey Blue: Beyond Tomorrow		#1-6	Jul – Dec 2008	Limited series	
Chuck		#1–6	Aug 2008 – Jan 2009	Limited series	
City of Tomorrow		#1–6	Jun – Nov 2005	Limited series	
Claw the Unconquered		#1–6	Aug 2006 – Jan 2007	Limited series	
Countdown		#1–8	Jun 2000 – Jan 2001	Limited series	
Coup d'État		#1–4	April 2004	Limited series	
Coup d'État	Afterword	#1	May 2004	One-shot	
Cybernary		#1–5	Nov 1995 – Mar 1996	Limited series; published by Image Comics.	
Cybernary 2.0		#1–6	Sep 2001 – Apr 2002	Limited series	
Danger Girl	Back in Black	#1–4	Jan – Apr 2006	Limited series	
Danger Girl	Body Shots	#1–4	June – Sep 2007	Limited series	
Danger Girl	Viva Las Danger	#1	Jan 2004	One-shot; published under the Cliffhanger! imprint.	
Darkchylde: The Legacy		#1–3	Aug 1998 – Jun 1999	Limited series	
Darkchylde Summer Swimsuit Spectacular		#1	Aug 1999		
DC/Wildstorm: DreamWar		#1–6	Jun 2008 – Nov 2008	Limited series	
Deathblow	vol. 2	#1-9	Dec. 2006 – Feb. 2008	Limited series	
Deathblow: Byblows		#1-3	Nov. 1999 – Jan. 2000	Limited series	
Desolation Jones		#1-8	July 2005 – Feb. 2007	Limited series	
Desperadoes: Epidemic!			Nov. 1999		
Desperadoes: Quiet of the Grave		#1-5	July – Nov. 2001		
Divine Intervention	Gen13	#1	Nov 1999	One-shot	
Divine Intervention	WildCats	#1	Nov 1999	One-shot	
Divine Right		#1-12	Sept. 1997 – Nov. 2000		
DV8		#0, 26-32	April – Nov. 1999	Earlier issues published by Image Comics.	
Eight Legged Freaks		–	Sep 2002	Graphic novel; movie adaptation.	
The Establishment		#1-13	Nov. 2001 – Nov. 2002		
EverQuest: The Ruins of Kunark		#1	Feb. 2002		
Ex Machina		#1-50	Aug 2004 – Sep 2010		
Ex Machina Special		#1-2	Jun – Aug 2006		
Ex Machina: Inside the Machine		#1	2007		
Ex Machina: Masquerade Special			Aug 2007		
Extinction Event		#1-5	Sep 2003 – Jan 2004	Limited series	
Farscape: War Torn		#1-2	April – May 2002	Limited series	
The Ferryman		#1-5	Dec 2008 – Mar 2009	Limited series	
Freddy vs. Jason vs. Ash		#1–6	Nov 2007 – Apr 2008	Limited series; co-published with Dynamite Entertainment	
Freddy vs. Jason vs. Ash	The Nightmare Warriors	#1–6	Aug – Dec 2009	Limited series; co-published with Dynamite Entertainment	
Friday the 13th		#1-6	Dec 2006 – May 2007	Limited series	
Friday the 13th	Abuser and the Abused	#1	April 2008	One-shot	
Friday the 13th	Bad Land	#1-2	Mar – Apr 2008	Limited series	
Friday the 13th	How I Spent My Summer Vacation	#1-2	Sep – Oct 2007	Limited series	
Friday the 13th	Pamela's Tale	#1–2	Jul – Aug 2007	Limited series	
Fringe		#0–6	Oct 2008 – Aug 2009	Limited series	
Fringe	Tales from the Fringe	#1–6	Jun 2010 – Nov 2010	Limited series	
The Further Adventures of the Whistling Skull			2010		
Garrison		#1-6	Jun – Nov 2010		
Gears of War		#1–24	Dec 2008 – Aug 2012	Limited series	
Gen 12		#1–5	Feb – Jun 1998		
Gen^{13}	vol. 1	#0–16	Sep 2002 – Feb 2004		
Gen^{13}	vol. 2	#1–39	Oct 2006 – Feb 2011		
Gen^{13} Bootleg		#1-20, Annual #1	Nov 1996 – Jul 1998		
Gen^{13}: London, New York, Hell		#1	Aug 2001		
Gen-Active		#1–6	May 2000 – Aug 2001		
Global Frequency		#1–12	Dec 2002 – Aug 2004		
God of War		#1–6	Mar 2010 – Jan 2011	Limited series; issue #6 was published by DC Comics after WildStorm's closure in December 2010.	
Grifter	vol. 1	#1–10	May 1995 – March 1996		
Grifter	vol. 2	#1-14	Jul 1996 – Aug 1997		
Grifter and Midnighter		#1–6	May – Oct 2007	Limited series	
Hazard		#1–7	Jun – Nov 1996	Limited series	
The Highwaymen		#1–5	Jun – Dec 2007	Limited series	
Ides of Blood		#1–6	Oct 2010 – Mar 2011	Limited series	
The Intimates		#1–12	Jan – Dec 2005		
Jenny Sparks: The Secret History of the Authority		#1–5	Aug 2000 – Mar 2001	Limited series	
Jet		#1–4	Nov 2000 – Feb 2001	Limited series	
Jezebelle		#1–6	Mar – Aug 2001	Limitedcserues	
Killapalooza		#1–6	Jul – Dec 2009	Limited series	
The Kindred II		#1–4	Mar – Jun 2002	Limited series	
Legend		#1–4	April – July 2005	Limited series	
Majestic		#1–17	Mar 2005 – Jul 2006		
A Man Called Kev		#1–5	Sep 2006 – Feb 2007	Limited series	
Masks: Too Hot for TV		#1	Feb 2004		
Matador		#1–6	Jul 2005 – Apr 2006	Limited series	
Midnighter		#1–20	Jan 2007 – Jun 2008		
Midnighter	Armageddon	#1	Dec 2007		
Mirror's Edge		#1–6	Dec 2008 – Jun 2009	Limited series	
The Monarchy		#1–12	April 2001 – May 2002		
Monster World		#1–4	Jul – Oct 2001	Limited series	
Mostly Wanted		#1–4	May – Aug 2000	Limited series	
Mr. Majestic		#1–9	Sep 1999 – May 2000	Limited series	
Mysterius: The Unfathomable		#1–6	Mar – Aug 2009	Limited series	
New Dynamix		#1-5	March – July 2008	Limited series	
New Line Cinema's Tales of Horror		#1	Sep 2007	One-shot	
Night Tribes			July 1999		
A Nightmare on Elm Street		#1–8	Oct 2006 – Jun 2007	Limited series	
Ninja Boy		#1-6	Oct 2001 – Mar 2002	Limited series	
Ninja Scroll		#1–8	Nov 2006 – Jun 2007	Limited series	
North 40		#1–6	Sep 2009 – Feb 2010	Limited series	
Number of the Beast		#1–6	Apr – Sep 2008	Bi-weekly publication.	
Ocean		#1–6	Dec 2004 – Sep 2005	Limited series	
The Patriots		#1–10	Jan – Oct 2000	Limited series	
Phantom Guard		#1–6	Aug 1997 – Mar 1998	Limited series	
Planetary		#1–27	Apr 1999 – Dec 2009		
Point Blank		#1–5	Oct 2002 – Feb 2003	Limited series	
The Programme		#1-12	Sep 2007 – Aug 2008		
Push		#1–6	Jan – Apr 2009	Limited series	
Racer X		#1–3	Oct – Dec 2000		
Red Herring		#1–6	Oct 2009 – Mar 2010		
Red Menace		#1–6	Jan – Jun 2007		
Reload		#1–3	May – Sep 2003		
Resident Evil: Fire and Ice		#1–4	Dec 2000 – May 2001		
The Resistance		#1–8	Nov 2002 – Jun 2003	Limited series	
Resistance		#1–6	Mar 2009 – Jul 2009	Limited series	
Robo Dojo		#1–6	Apr – Sep 2002	Limited series	
Robotech		#1-6	Feb – Jul 2003		
Robotech Sourcebook		#1	Mar 2003		
Robotech: Invasion		#1-5	Mar – Jul 2004		
Robotech: Love and War		#1-6	Aug 2003 – Jan 2004		
Robotech: Prelude to the Shadow Chronicles		#1-5	Dec 2005 – Mar 2006		
Savant Garde		#1-7	Mar – Sep 1997		
Sci-Tech		#1-4	Sep – Dec 1999		
The Secret History of the Authority: Jack Hawksmoor		#1–6	Mar – Oct 2008		
Skye Runner		#1–6	Jun 2006 – Mar 2007		
Sleeper		#1–12	Mar 2003 – Mar 2004		
Sleeper Season Two		#1–12	Aug 2004 – Jul 2005		
Snakes on a Plane		#1–2	Oct – Nov 2006	Limited series	
Speed Racer		#1-3	Oct. – Dec. 1999	Earlier series published by NOW Comics.	
Star Trek: All of Me			April 2000		
Star Trek: Deep Space Nine - N-Vector		#1-4	Aug – Nov 2000		
Star Trek: Divided We Fall		#1-4	Jul – Oct 2001		
Star Trek: Enter the Wolves			2001		
Star Trek Special			2001		
Star Trek: New Frontier - Double Time		#1	Nov 2000		
Star Trek: The Next Generation - Perchance to Dream		#1-4	Feb – May 2000		
Star Trek: The Next Generation - The Killing Shadows		#1-4	Nov 2000 – Feb 2001		
Star Trek: Voyager - Avalon Rising		#1	Sep 2000		
Star Trek: Voyager - Elite Force		#1	July 2000	Graphic novel	
Stormwatch	vol. 1	#1-50	Mar 1993 – Jul 1997	Ongoing series	
Stormwatch	vol. 2	#1-11	Oct 1997 – Sep 1998		
Stormwatch: Team Achilles		#1–23	Sep 2002 – Aug 2004		
Stormwatch: P.H.D.		#1–24	Jan 2007 – Jan 2010		
Stormwatch P.H.D.: Armegeddon		#1	Dec 2007		
Superman/Gen^{13}		#1–3	Jun – Aug 2000	Limited series	
Superman/ThunderCats		#1	Jan 2004	One-shot	
Supernatural: Origins		#1–6	Jul – Dec 2007	Limited series	
Supernatural: Rising Son		#1–6	April 2008	Limited series	
Taleweaver		#1–6	Nov 2001 – Apr 2002	Limited series	
Team 7		#1-4	Oct 1994 – Feb 1995	Limited series	
Team Zero		#1-6	Feb – Jul 2006	Written by Chuck Dixon, penciled by Doug Mahnke, and inked by Sandra Hope, the series features Team Zero, a black ops group that was to infiltrate and obtain secret Nazi rocket plans during World War II. It is composed of Michael Cray, Austen T. Blanchard, Willis S. Miller, Andrzej Taszycki, Chester Brophy, Marc Slayton, and Samuel (Saito) Nakadai. The series has been collected into a trade paperback: Team Zero (144 pages, Titan Books, June 2008, ISBN 1-84576-856-6, Wildstorm, April 2008, ISBN 1-4012-1736-2)	
The Texas Chainsaw Massacre		#1–6	Jan –Jun 2007	Limited series	
The Texas Chainsaw Massacre	About a Boy	#1	Sep 2007	One-shot	
The Texas Chainsaw Massacre	By Himself	#1	Oct 2007	One-shot	
The Texas Chainsaw Massacre	Cut!	#1	Aug 2007	One-shot	
The Texas Chainsaw Massacre	Raising Cain	#1–3	Jul – Sep 2008	Limited series	
Thunderbolt Jaxon		#1–5	Apr – Aug 2006	Limited series	
ThunderCats		#0-5	Oct 2002 – Feb 2003	Limited series	
ThunderCats	Dogs of War	#1-5	Aug – Dec 2003	Limited series	
ThunderCats	Enemy's Pride	#1-5	Aug – Dec 2004	Limited series	
ThunderCats	Hammerhand's Revenge	#1-5	Dec 2003 – Apr 2004	Limited series	
ThunderCats	Sourcebook	#1	Jan 2003		
ThunderCats	The Return	#1-5	Apr – Aug 2003	Limited series	
ThunderCats: Origins	Heroes and Villains	#1	Feb 2004	One-shot	
ThunderCats: Origins	Villains and Heroes	#1	Feb 2004	One-shot	
ThunderCats/Battle of the Planets		#1	July 2003	One-shot; co-published with Top Cow Productions, preceded by the similarly titled Battle of the Planets/ThunderCats (May 2003).	
Trick 'r Treat		#1-4	Oct. 2007	Weekly publication.	
Twilight Experiment		#1–6	Apr – Sep 2005	Limited series	
Two-Step		#1–3	Dec 2003 – Jul 2004	Limited series	
Union	vol. 1	#0-4	Jul 1993 – Mar 1994	Limited series	
Union	vol. 2	#1-9	Feb 1995 – Feb 1996	Limited series	
Victorian Undead		#1-6	Jan – Jun 2010	Limited series	
Victorian Undead	Sherlock Holmes vs. Jekyll/Hyde	#1-5	Jan 2011 – May 2011	Limited series	
Warblade: Endangered Species		#1-4	Jan – Apr 1995	Limited series	
Welcome to Tranquility		#1–12	Feb 2007 – Jan 2008		
Welcome to Tranquility	Armageddon	#1	Jan 2008	One-shot	
Welcome to Tranquility	One Foot in the Grave	#1–6	Sep 2010 – Feb 2011	Limited series	
Wetworks		#1–15	Nov 2006 – Jan 2008	Ongoing series	
Wetworks	Armageddon	#1	Jan 2008	One-shot	
Wetworks	Mutations	#1	Nov 2010	One-shot	
WildCats	vol. 1	#1-28, Annual 2000	March 1999 – Dec. 2001	Ongoing series	
WildCats	vol. 2	#1	Dec. 2006	One-shot	
WildCats	Armageddon	#1	Feb 2008	One-shot	
WildCats	Ladytron	#1	Oct 2000	One-shot	
WildCats	Mosaic	#1	Feb 2000	One-shot	
WildCats	Nemesis	#1-9	Nov 2005 – Jul 2006	Limited series	
WildCats	Version 3.0	#1–24	Oct 2002 – Oct 2004		
Wildcore		#1-10	Nov 1997 – Dec 1998	Limited series	
Wild Girl		#1-6	Jan – June 2005	Limited series	
Wildsiderz		#0-2	Aug – Dec 2005	Limited series	
Wildstorm Annual 2000		#1	2000		
Wildstorm Fine Arts: Spotlight on J. Scott Campbell		#1	May 2007		
Wildstorm Fine Arts: Spotlight on Jim Lee		#1	Feb. 2007		
Wildstorm Fine Arts: Spotlight on the Authority		#1	Jan. 2008		
Wildstorm Fine Arts: Spotlight on Gen^{13}		#1	Feb. 2008		
Wildstorm Halloween Trilogy of Terror		#1	Oct. 1997		
Wildstorm Rarities		#1	Dec 1994		
Wildstorm Sampler		#1	Sep 1996		
Wildstorm Spotlight		#1-4	Feb – May 1997		
Wildstorm Summer Special		#1	Oct 2001		
Wildstorm Swimsuit Special		#1-2	Dec 1994 – Aug 1995		
Wildstorm Thunderbook		#1	Oct 2000		
Wildstorm Universe		#0	2009		
Wildstorm Universe Sourcebook		#1	May 1995		
Wildstorm Winter Special		#1	Jan 2005		
Wildstorm Chamber of Horrors		#1	Oct 1995		
Wild Times	Deathblow	#1	Aug 1999		
Wild Times	DV8	#1	Aug 1999		
Wild Times	Gen^{13}	#1	Aug 1999		
Wild Times	Grifter	#1	Aug 1999		
Wild Times	Wetworks	#1	Aug 1999		
Wild Times	WildCats	#0	Aug 1999	Wizard #0 special.	
Winter Men		#1–5	Oct 2005 – Nov 2006	Limited series	
World of Warcraft		#1-25	Jan 2008 – Jan 2010	Ongoing series	'
Worldstorm		#1-2	Dec 2006 – May 2007	Limited series	
Wraithborn		#1-6	Nov 2005 – May 2006	Limited series	
The X-Files		#0–6	Sep 2008 – Jun 2009	Limited series	
The X-Files/30 Days of Night		#1–6	Sep 2010 – Feb 2011	Limited series; co-published with IDW Publishing, which will later gain the comic rights to The X-Files three years later.	
Zero Girl: Full Circle		#1–5	Jan – May 2003	Limited series	
Zealot		#1–3	Aug – Nov 1995	Limited series	

=== ABC ===
America's Best Comics was an imprint of Wildstorm that published Alan Moore's League of Extraordinary Gentlemen and his ABC line of comics.

Title	Series	Issues	Dates	Notes
America's Best Comics 64-Page Giant			Feb. 2001	
America's Best Comics: A to Z, Greyshirt and Cobweb			Jan. 2006	
America's Best Comics: A to Z, Terra Obscura and Splash Brannigan			March 2006	
America's Best Comics: A to Z, Tom Strong and Jack B. Quick			Nov. 2005	
America's Best Comics: A to Z, Top 10 and Teams			July 2006	
America's Best Comic's Sketch Book			Sept. 2001	
Greyshirt		#1-6	Dec. 2001 – Aug. 2002	
The League of Extraordinary Gentlemen, Volume One		#1-6	March 1999 – Sept. 2000	
The League of Extraordinary Gentlemen, Volume II		#1-6	Sept. 2002 – Nov. 2003	
The League of Extraordinary Gentlemen: Black Dossier			Nov. 2007	
The Many Worlds of Tesla Strong		#1	July 2003	
Promethea		#1-32	Aug. 1999 – April 2005	
Smax		#1-5	Oct. 2003 – May 2004	
Terra Obscura	vol. 1	#1-6	Aug. 2003 – Feb. 2004	
Terra Obscura	vol. 2	#1-6	Oct. 2004 – April 2005	
Tom Strong		#1-36	June 1999 – Feb. 2006	
Tom Strong's Terrific Tales		#1-12	Jan. 2002 – Jan. 2005	
Tomorrow Stories		#1-12	Oct. 1999 – Dec. 2001	
Top 10		#1-12	Sept. 1999 –Oct. 2001	
Top 10: Beyond the Farthest Precinct		#1-5	Oct. 2005 – Feb. 2006	
Top Ten: The Forty Niners			Jan. 2005	

=== Cliffhanger ===
Title	Series	Issues	Dates	Notes
Arrowsmith		#1-6	Sept. 2003 – May 2004	
Battle Chasers		#1-8	1998–2001	
Crimson		#8-24	March 1999 – Feb. 2001	Earlier issues published by Image Comics.
Crimson: Scarlet X - Blood on the Moon			1999	
Crimson Sourcebook			1999	
Danger Girl		#5-7	July 1999 – Feb. 2001	Earlier issues published by Image Comics.
Danger Girl 3-D Special		#1	April 2003	
Danger Girl Special		#1	Feb. 2000	
Danger Girl: Viva Las Danger		#1	Jan. 2004	
Danger Girl: Hawaiian Punch		#1	May 2003	
Danger Girl: Kamikaze		#1-2	Nov. – Dec. 2001	
Danger Girl Sketchbook			2000	
High Roads		#1-6	2002	
Kamikaze		#1-6	2003–2004	
Out There		#1-18	2001–2003	
The Possessed		#1-6	Sept. 2003 – March 2004	
Steampunk		#1-12	April 2000 – Aug. 2002	
Steampunk: Catechism		#1	Jan. 2000	
Tokyo Storm Warning		#1-3	2003	
Two-Step		#1-3	2003–2004	

=== Eye of the Storm ===
Short-lived mature-aged line.

=== Homage Comics ===
Title	Series	Issues	Dates	Notes
Astro City 3-D Special		#1	Dec. 1997	
Astro City: Local Heroes		#1-5	March 2003 – Feb. 2004	
Astro City/Arrowsmith		#1	June 2004	
Ball and Chain		#1-4	Nov. 1999 – Feb. 2000	
Desperadoes		#1-5	Sept. 1997 – June 1998	
Disavowed		#1-3	March – May 2000	
Four Women		#1-5	Dec. 2001 – April 2002	
Kurt Busiek's Astro City	vol. 2	#16-22	March 1999 – Aug. 2000	Previously published by Image Comics.
Leave it to Chance		#1-12	June 1999	Moved to Image Comics for issue #13.
Mek		#1-3	Jan. – Mar. 2003	
Nightfall: The Black Chronicles		#1-3	Dec. 1999 – Feb. 2000	
Red		#1-3	Sept. 2003 – Feb. 2004	
Reload		#1-3	May – Sept. 2003	
Stray		#1	2001	
Yeah!		#1-8	Oct. 1999 – May 2000	
Zero Girl		#1-5	Feb. – June 2001	

==== Crossovers ====
- Captain Atom: Armageddon
- Coup d'Etat
- Fire From Heaven
- Devil's Night
- Planetary/Authority: Ruling the World
- Planetary/JLA: Terra Occulta
- Planetary/Batman: Night on Earth
- WildC.A.T.s/Aliens
- WildC.A.T.s/X-Men
- Wildstorm Annual
- Wildstorm Rising
- Wild Times

==== Non-universe titles ====
- Bay City Jive
- Casey Blue: Beyond Tomorrow
- Global Frequency
- The Highwaymen
- Legend
- The Programme

===== Licensed titles =====
- Aiva's Story
- Assassin's Creed: The Fall
- Bullet Witch
- EverQuest
- Heroes
- Modern Warfare 2: Ghost
- Nier
- Ninja Scroll
- Resident Evil
- Robotech
- Speed Racer

=== Wildstorm Signature Series ===
- Albion
- The American Way
- Desolation Jones
- Ex Machina
- Manifest Eternity
- Matador
- Ocean
- Silent Dragon
