= Wildstorm: Armageddon =

- Cover of Wildstorm: Armageddon (2008), art by Mike McKone
- Publisher: Wildstorm (as a DC Comics imprint)
- Publication date: December 2007 – February 2008
- Genre: Superhero; Crossover
Title(s)
Gen^{13}: Armageddon #1
Midnighter: Armageddon #1
Stormwatch: PHD: Armageddon #1
Welcome to Tranquility: Armageddon #1
Wetworks: Armageddon #1
Wildcats: Armageddon #1

Creative team
- Writer(s): Christos Gage
- Artist(s): Various (see issues)
- Wildstorm: Armageddon: ISBN 1-4012-1703-6

"Wildstorm: Armageddon" was a late 2007 comic book crossover event in the Wildstorm Universe, written by Christos Gage and drawn by various artists.

Armageddon led into a number of bi-weekly series, Wildstorm: Revelations and Number of the Beast, which resulted in the relaunch of a number of Wildstorm titles.

== Issues ==
The issues were:

- "Midnighter: Armageddon" (art by Simon Coleby)
- "Welcome to Tranquility: Armageddon" (art by Horacio Domingues/Neil Googe)
- "Wetworks: Armageddon" (art by Brandon Badeaux)
- "Gen^{13}: Armageddon" (pencils by JonBoy Meyers and inks by Tony Washington
- "Stormwatch: Post Human Division: Armageddon" (with pencils by Leandro Fernandez and inks by Francisco Paronzini)
- "Wildcats: Armageddon" (with art by Talent Caldwell)

== Collected editions ==
The titles were brought together into a trade paperback:

- Wildstorm: Armageddon (144 pages, Titan Books, May 2008, ISBN 1-84576-749-7, DC Comics, April 2008, ISBN 1-4012-1703-6)
