= Welcome to Tranquility =

Publication information
- Publisher: Wildstorm (DC Comics)
- Schedule: Monthly
- Format: Ongoing series
- Genre: Superhero
- Publication date: February 2007 - January 2008
- No. of issues: 12

Creative team
- Created by: Gail Simone; Neil Googe
- Written by: Gail Simone
- Artist: Neil Googe
- Letterer: Travis Lanham
- Colorist: Carrie Strachan
- Editor(s): Ben Abernathy; Kristy Quinn

Collected editions
- Volume 1: ISBN 1-4012-1516-5
- Volume 2: ISBN 1-4012-1773-7

Welcome to Tranquility is an American comic book series created by Gail Simone and Neil Googe. It is published by Wildstorm.

The series is set in Tranquility, a fictional town in Oregon, which is home to retired superheroes and supervillains (known colloquially as "Maxis") and their families. This town coexists with the existing Wildstorm Universe, with frequent references to its heroes, such as The Authority and Gen^{13}.

== Publication history ==
The ongoing series started in December 2006. A new story arc started in issue #7. Like Stormwatch: Post Human Division, the series stopped at issue #12 and it then appeared as part of the Christos Gage-written "Wildstorm: Armageddon" crossover storyline, with artist Horacio Domingues.

Unlike Stormwatch: PHD, and other titles involved in that story, it was not one of those that was announced as restarting in 2008 with World's End. However, it continued in a six-issue limited series, entitled Welcome to Tranquility: One Foot in the Grave, with Simone returning to write it and Domingues staying on to provide the art.

== Characters ==
Main characters

- Sheriff Thomasina "Tommy" Lindo, the town's sheriff.
- Colonel Isaac Cragg - Former member of the Liberty Squad.
- Deputy Presley Duray - Former sheriff of Tranquility, now a deputy for Sheriff Lindo.
- Bad Dog - Colonel Cragg's topkick during their military service, who served with him on the Liberty Squad.
- Emoticon - Local teenager and grandson of a villain known as The Typist, who causes trouble for the citizens of Tranquility.
- Mayor Alex Fury - The mayor of Tranquility, husband of Suzy Fury, formerly a Maxi Hero known as "Judge Fury" and Liberty Squad leader.
- Suzy Fury - Former actress, pin-up model and superheroine, formerly the Liberty Squad's "secretary"
- Dr. Rachel Steel - The town doctor, and a Maxi.

Minor characters

- Acolyte - A World War II-era Maxi who possesses healing powers.
- Captain Cobra - Maxi resident of Tranquility and sworn enemies with his neighbor, Mongoose Man.
- Cedric - Collette Pearson's camera man.
- Henry Hyde - Former nemesis of Maximum Man, since reformed. He has a twin brother.
- Seresa Lindo - Minxy Minerva's assistant and sister of Sheriff Lindo.
- Lisa - The town dispatch officer.
- Minxy Minerva - Tranquility resident and former child aviatrix and aeronautics engineer.
- Mongoose Man - Maxi resident of Tranquility, sworn enemies with Captain Cobra.
- Sampson Twins - Obnoxious Maxi twins who are presumed to have enhanced strength.
- Slapjack - Father or father-in-law of Deena Terrell, and grandfather to Leona Terell.
- Arnold Stipple - Better known under his Maxi name of Cosmos, former member of the Liberty Squad.
- Deena Terrell - Daughter or daughter-in-law of Slapjack, and mother of Leona Terrell.
- Kyle Trueblood - Former member of the Liberty Squad, under the Maxi name of Maximum Man
- Deputy Troy Veron - One of Sheriff Lindo's deputies.
- Zeke - An undead Maxi, whose status as a hero or villain is unknown.
- Liberty Snots - Former child stars who have grown up and become a Goth band, considered to be bratty kids.
  - Kevin Emils - Front man for the Liberty Snots.
  - Leona Terrell - Stage name "Ajita", who inherited powers as a speedster from her grandfather, Slapjack.
  - Arson - Power of pyrokinesis.
  - Freaksho - Real name and powers unknown.
  - Mangacide - Jess dresses in a loligoth fashion.
  - M-T - Byron is the grandson of the Maxi Doc Tomorrow.
  - Silicon Stiletto - Her powers involve clawed fingers.

== Collected editions ==
The series was collected into two trade paperbacks:

- Volume 1 (collects Welcome to Tranquility #1-6, 160 pages, WildStorm, December 2007, ISBN 1-4012-1516-5)
- Volume 2 (collects Welcome to Tranquility #7-12, 144 pages, WildStorm, May 2008, ISBN 1-4012-1773-7)

== Awards ==
In 2007, Thomasina Lindo of was named Best Female Character in the Glyph Comics Awards.
