= Gen12 =

1998 comic book series by Brandon Choi

Cover of the first issue

Gen12 is a comic book series from Wildstorm by Brandon Choi with art by Michael Ryan. It was a 5-issue mini-series published in 1998. It featured characters from the series Team 7. It is also the codename for the subjects of a scientific experiment within the Wildstorm Universe.

== Publication history ==
The story takes place in the 1990s, but is filled with flashbacks that take place in the late 1970s and early 1980s, following events in the Team 7: Dead Reckoning mini-series.

After the death of Miles Craven, head of International Operations, the US government orders commander Thomas Morgan to investigate Miles Craven's secret operation, Project Genesis, the resulting defection of John Lynch and the disappearance of Ivana Baiul. The main subjects of Project Genesis were the members of Team 7 and Morgan tracks down their friends and families to find out what happened between Craven and Team 7.

The purpose of the Gen12 series was to provide the connection between the stories in Chuck Dixon's Team 7-series (taking place in the 1970s) and the Wildstorm titles taking place in the 1990s. This made Gen12 a very continuity-filled series. The series contains references to and characters from Gen^{13}, Divine Right, Deathblow, and many more.

== Fictional history ==
Miles Craven, head of International Operations was determined to create superhuman soldiers for his army and therefore started Project: Genesis. The most promising method of creating superhumans was the Gen-Factor, a substance with the ability to bestow superhuman powers on people exposed to it, making them Gen-actives. The Gen-Factor was discovered by Dr. Simon Tsung, who had extracted it from Ethan McCain, a baby he had found with superhuman powers. Craven used the Gen-Factor on many subjects, but all either died, went insane or mutated into monstrous beings. He finally succeeded with Team 7 and the survivors of the experiment were labeled Gen12. Later other Gen12-superhumans were seen, but the Team 7 members appeared to be the most successful and the most powerful of the Gen12.

A revival of Project Genesis about 20 years later produced Gen^{13}. The name Gen^{13} is only used for the members of the superhero group Gen^{13}, while other Gen-Actives of their generation simply refer to themselves as Gen-Active (like DV8). Gen12 and Gen^{13} refer to generations of Americans.
