= Doug Mahnke =

American comic book artist and penciller (born 1963)

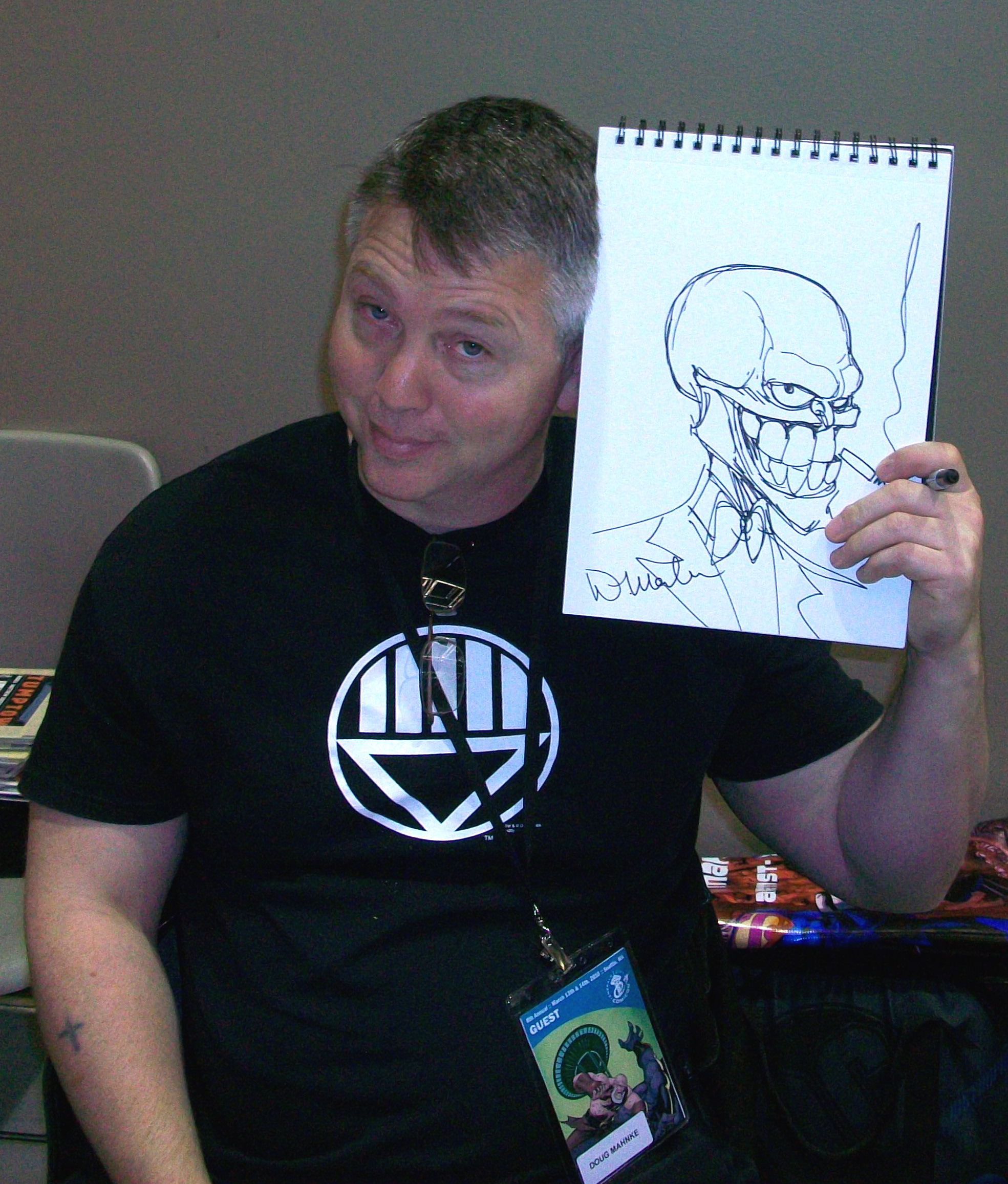
- Mahnke at Emerald City Comicon in 2010
- Born: Douglas Mahnke
- Areas: Penciller, Inker
- Notable works: The Mask; JLA (Vol. 3); Batman; Final Crisis; Green Lantern (Vol. 4)

Douglas Mahnke (/ˈmæŋki/) is an American comic book artist, known for his work and penciling books including The Mask, JLA, Batman, Final Crisis, and Green Lantern.

== Career ==
Mahnke's first prominent work was for The Mask, and he has since worked for DC Comics on JLA, Batman with writer Judd Winick, and Seven Soldiers: Frankenstein with Grant Morrison. Mahnke's work on Batman included the story "Under the Hood", which detailed how the previously deceased second Robin, Jason Todd, was alive and actively working against Batman's interests as the Red Hood. Mahnke also worked on the critically acclaimed prestige one-shot Batman: The Man Who Laughs with writer Ed Brubaker.

His work also includes titles such as Major Bummer, Superman: The Man of Steel, Team Zero and Justice League Elite. He was the original artist for the Dark Horse Comics title X, a run inked by Jimmy Palmiotti, as well as being the cover artist for King Tiger/Motorhead, a two-issue series set in the same universe as X. In 2005, with comic book inker Tom Nguyen, Mahnke produced two comic book art instructional DVDs. In 2006, he took over the art for Stormwatch P.H.D. for Wildstorm Comics. His work in 2007 included the DC mini, Black Adam: The Dark Age written by Peter Tomasi, detailing Black Adam's mourning over his wife Isis and regaining his powers. In 2008, he reunited with Tomasi to pencil an issue of Nightwing for the writer.

Mahnke was an important collaborator with writer Grant Morrison on DC's event series Final Crisis, pencilling the Requiem one-shot and the two-issue Superman Beyond 3D tie-in. Mahnke also pencilled the final pages of the main series' 6th issue featuring the "death" of Batman, and replaced artist J. G. Jones entirely on the series finale issue #7 over concerns of Jones' speed.

Starting in July 2009, Mahnke became the ongoing artist for DC's Green Lantern with writer Geoff Johns, right at the beginning of the Blackest Night storyline.

He drew The Multiversity: Ultra Comics (May 2015), the eighth issue of Grant Morrison's The Multiversity project.

== Bibliography ==
=== Interior work ===
- Homicide (with John Arcudi, Dark Horse):
  - Dark Horse Presents #25–29 (anthology, 1988–1989)
  - Homicide Special: "The Hungry Gods" (one-shot, 1990)
- The Mask (with John Arcudi, Dark Horse):
  - Mayhem #1–4: "The Mask" (anthology, 1989)
  - The Mask #1–4 + The Mask Returns #1–4 + The Mask Strikes Back #1–5 (1991; 1992–1993; 1995)
  - A Decade of Dark Horse #3: "Night of the Return of the Living Ipkiss...Kinda" (anthology, 1996)
  - Walter: Campaign of Terror #1–4 (1996)
  - Lobo/Mask #1–2 (with Alan Grant, 1997)
- X #1–5, 9 (with Steven Grant, Dark Horse, 1994)
- Aliens: Stronghold #1–4 (with John Arcudi, Dark Horse, 1994)
- Silver Sable and the Wild Pack #26 (with John Arcudi, Marvel, 1994)
- Major Bummer #1–15 (with John Arcudi, DC Comics, 1997–1998)
- Gen^{13} vol. 2 #38: "The Roar of the Greasepaint" (with John Arcudi, co-feature, Wildstorm, 1999)
- Superman: The Man of Steel #87–89, 91, 93, 95–98, 100, 102–105, 107–108, 110–111, 114–118 (with Mark Schultz, DC Comics, 1999–2001)
- Superman and Batman: World's Funnest: "Last Imp Standing!" (with Evan Dorkin, among other artists, one-shot, DC Comics, 2000)
- Hitman/Lobo: That Stupid Bastich! (with Garth Ennis, one-shot, DC Comics, 2000)
- Martian Manhunter vol. 3 #24: "Revelations, Part Five" (with John Ostrander, DC Comics, 2000)
- Superman: Lex 2000: "Where Were You" (with Jeph Loeb, anthology one-shot, DC Comics, 2001)
- Action Comics (DC Comics):
  - "What's So Funny About Truth, Justice and the American Way?" (with Joe Kelly and Lee Bermejo, in #775, 2001)
  - "Superman Reborn, Parts Two and Four" (with Dan Jurgens, in #975–976, 2017)
- JLA #61–68, 70, 72, 74–75, 78–79, 84–89, 100 (with Joe Kelly, DC Comics, 2002–2004)
  - Justice League Elite #1–12 (with Joe Kelly, DC Comics, 2004–2005)
  - JLA/Cyberforce (with Joe Kelly, one-shot, DC Comics/Top Cow, 2005)
- Masks: Too Hot for TV!: "Introduction" (with Ed Brubaker, anthology one-shot, Eye of the Storm, 2004)
- DC Comics Presents: The Flash: "Flash Back!" (with Dennis O'Neil, anthology one-shot, DC Comics, 2004)
- Batman: The Man Who Laughs (with Ed Brubaker, graphic novel, DC Comics, 2005)
- Batman #635–639, 641, 645, 647–648 (with Judd Winick, DC Comics, 2005–2006)
- Seven Soldiers: Frankenstein #1–4 (with Grant Morrison, DC Comics, 2006)
- Team Zero #1–6 (with Chuck Dixon, Wildstorm, 2006)
- Stormwatch P.H.D. (with Christos Gage, Wildstorm):
  - Worldstorm #1: "Stormwatch" (anthology, 2006)
  - "Post-Human Division" (in #1–4 and 6–7, 2007)
- Black Adam: The Dark Age #1–6 (with Peter Tomasi, DC Comics, 2007–2008)
- Countdown #8, 3 (with Scott Beatty, "Origins" co-features, DC Comics, 2008)
- Final Crisis (DC Comics):
  - Final Crisis: Requiem (with Peter Tomasi, one-shot, 2008)
  - Final Crisis: Superman Beyond #1–2 (with Grant Morrison, 2008–2009)
  - Final Crisis #6-7 (with Grant Morrison, J. G. Jones and Carlos Pacheco, DC Comics, 2009)
- Nightwing #151: "The Great Leap, Epilogue" (with Peter Tomasi and Shawn Moll, DC Comics, 2008)
- Justice League of America (DC Comics):
  - "The Second Coming, Part Four" (with Dwayne McDuffie, among other artists, in vol. 2 #25, 2008)
  - "Trinity War" (with Geoff Johns and Jeff Lemire, in vol. 3 #6–7, 2013)
  - "Paradise Lost" (with Matt Kindt, in vol. 3 #8, 2013)
- Green Lantern vol. 4 #43–48, 50–62, 64–67 and vol. 5 #1–5, 7–11, 0, 13–17, 20 (with Geoff Johns, DC Comics, 2009–2013)
- Justice League (DC Comics):
  - "Injustice League" (with Geoff Johns and Ivan Reis (#35), in vol. 2 #25, 29–33 and 35, 2014)
  - "Legion of Doom, Part One" (with James Tynion IV, in vol. 4 #5, 2018)
  - "Invasion of the Supermen" (with Robert Venditti, in vol. 4 #40 and 43, 2020)
- Batman and Robin vol. 2 #31, Annual #2 (with Peter Tomasi and Patrick Gleason, DC Comics, 2014)
- Secret Origins vol. 3 #1: "The Secret Origin of Dick Grayson!" (with Kyle Higgins, anthology, DC Comics, 2014)
- The Multiversity: Ultra Comics: "Ultra Comics Lives!" (with Grant Morrison, one-shot, 2015)
- Superman/Wonder Woman #13–26 (with Peter Tomasi, Ed Benes (#15–17) and Tom Derenick + Ardian Syaf (#24), DC Comics, 2015–2016)
- Batman/Superman #31–32: "The Final Days of Superman, Parts Two and Three" (with Peter Tomasi, DC Comics, 2016)
- Superman vol. 4 Rebirth, #5, 8–9, 12–13, 22–25, 29, 33–34, 36, 40, 44 (with Peter Tomasi, Patrick Gleason and James Robinson (#40), DC Comics, 2016–2018)
- Dark Nights: Metal (with Scott Snyder, James Tynion IV and Joshua Williamson, DC Comics):
  - Batman Lost (with Jorge Jiménez and Yanick Paquette, one-shot, 2018)
  - The Wild Hunt (with Grant Morrison, Jorge Jiménez and Howard Porter, one-shot, 2018)
- Detective Comics #994–1000, 1008, 1012–1016 (with Peter Tomasi, DC Comics, 2018–2020)

=== Covers only ===
- Dark Horse Presents #49, 64, 134 (Dark Horse, 1991–1998)
- Dr. Giggles #1–2 (Dark Horse, 1992)
- Comics' Greatest World: Arcadia #4 (Dark Horse, 1993)
- Comics' Greatest World: Vortex #1 (Dark Horse, 1993)
- Out of the Vortex #1 (Dark Horse, 1993)
- Barb Wire: Ace of Spades #3–4 (Dark Horse, 1996)
- King Tiger and Motorhead #1–2 (Dark Horse, 1996)
- Randy Bowen's Decapitator #1 (Dark Horse, 1998)
- The Mask: Toys in the Attic #1–4 (Dark Horse, 1998)
- Space Bunnies Must Die! #1 (Dark Horse, 1998)
- Superman: Secret Files #2 (DC Comics, 1999)
- Superman: The Man of Steel #99, 101 (DC Comics, 2000)
- Batman #573 (DC Comics, 2000)
- Superman vol. 2 #158 (DC Comics, 2000)
- Action Comics #767, 1000 (DC Comics, 2000; 2018)
- Adventures of Superman #580, 629 (DC Comics, 2000; 2004)
- JLA #69, 71, 73, 76, 80–83, 90–93 (DC Comics, 2002–2004)
- Outsiders vol. 3 #18–19, 21–23 (DC Comics, 2005)
- Stormwatch P.H.D. #5 (Wildstorm, 2007)
- Number of the Beast #1 (Wildstorm, 2008)
- Nightwing #144 (DC Comics, 2008)
- JLA: Classified #39 (DC Comics, 2008)
- Blackest Night: Tales of the Corps #3 (DC Comics, 2009)
- Blackest Night #8 (DC Comics, 2009)
- inFamous #1–2 (DC Comics, 2011)
- Flashpoint: Frankenstein and the Creatures of the Unknown #1–3 (DC Comics, 2011)
- DC Universe Online: Legends #16–17 (DC Comics, 2011–2012)
- Green Lantern Corps vol. 2 #1 (DC Comics, 2011)
- Green Lantern vol. 5 #6, 12, 38, 50 (DC Comics, 2012–2016)
- Team 7 vol. 2 #1 (DC Comics, 2012)
- Justice League vol. 2 #23 (DC Comics, 2013)
- Justice League Dark #23 (DC Comics, 2013)
- Justice League of America vol. 3 #9 (DC Comics, 2013)
- Earth 2 #17 (DC Comics, 2014)
- Sinestro #1 (DC Comics, 2014)
- Suicide Squad vol. 4 #30 (DC Comics, 2014)
- Batman: Black and White vol. 2 #6 (DC Comics, 2014)
- Sensation Comics vol. 2 Chapter 36 (DC Digital, 2015)
- Harley Quinn vol. 3 #1 (DC Comics, 2016)
- Superman vol. 4 #6, 30 (DC Comics, 2016–2017)
- Green Lantern/Space Ghost #1 (Hanna-Barbera, 2017)
- Justice League of America vol. 5 #1–25 (DC Comics, 2017–2018)
- Hal Jordan and the Green Lantern Corps #45, 48 (DC Comics, 2018)
- Gotham City Garage Chapter 23 (DC Digital, 2018)
- Super Sons/Dynomutt #1 (Hanna-Barbera, 2018)
- Cursed Comics Cavalcade #1 (DC Comics, 2018)
- Supergirl vol. 7 #25 (DC Comics, 2019)
- Swamp Thing Giant #1 (DC Comics, 2019)
- Detective Comics #1009 (DC Comics, 2019)
