= Mike Heisler =

American comic book writer

- Areas: Writer, Editor, Letterer
- Notable works: DV8; Union

Mike Heisler is an American comic book writer known for his work on the series DV8 and Union. He also penned the Gen^{13} mini-series Gen^{13}: Interactive and the one-shot Gen^{13}: The Unreal World.

Heisler got his start in the industry in the late 1980s as a letterer, primarily for Marvel Comics. From there, he moved into writing and editing.

In December 2009, Heisler was announced as the editor of a revived version of the landmark monster movie magazine Famous Monsters of Filmland.

Heisler has also worked for Dark Horse Comics.
