= Divine Right: The Adventures of Max Faraday =

Comic Series by Jim Lee

Divine Right : The Adventures of Max Faraday
- Divine Right #1 cover

Publication information
- Publisher: Wildstorm
- Schedule: Monthly
- Format: Limited series
- Publication date: 1997
- No. of issues: 12
- Main character(s): Max Faraday; Susanna Chaste

Creative team
- Written by: Jim Lee
- Artist(s): Jim Lee

Divine Right: The Adventures of Max Faraday is a twelve-issue comic book limited series created, written, and drawn by Jim Lee and published by American company Wildstorm from 1997 to 1999. Its protagonist is Max Faraday, a computer science student who inadvertently becomes the receptacle of an incredible mystic power.

== Plot ==
Millennia ago, a gigantic creation engine fell to Earth, crashing in the Middle East. An engine capable of unthinkable power, it was later to be called the Creation Wheel, potentially able to provide a user with the power of God. It would lie dormant for centuries, with its power creating a holographic realm of energy-projection known as the Hollow Realm, regarded as the gates of Heaven by the artificial beings who lived there.

However, whilst there were people willing to wait for the Messiah, others wished to take the power for themselves and begin again, rewriting the universe to their own desire. The principal architect of this dream was the shadowy (Cardinal Lazarus), backed with the might of Lord Acheron, the villainous brother of Tobruk, and Lord Jesthra, a powerful minion.

The story then flashes forward to the modern day, minus a few years. Operation Divine Right, run by the super-espionage group I.O (International Operations), has uncovered the Creation Wheel. The Dark Arts, a sub-section of I.O, working with the Coda assassins and Lazarus, sponsor a translation of the futuristic hieroglyphics by Mattheus Senreich, rendering the codes into a binary number string known as the Creation Equation, which supposedly allows an individual to access the full power of the Creation Wheel. The only copy of the Equation is stolen by undercover I.O operative Christy Blaze and uploaded to Icore, the I.O mainframe.

Max Faraday, a 20-year-old computer science major and lovable loser, logs into Icore using his old professor's access codes. Something starts downloading: a binary code string. Max views it all (barring one file, which he forwards to his cyber-girlfriend, Susanna Chaste) before the computer explodes as a result of channelling the Equation.

Seemingly fine, Max and Dev head out, only to be pursued by strange creatures, bringing about the first manifestations of his power, and the first meeting with The Fallen, his protectors and mentors. The Fallen are Brande, Tobruk, and Exotica: a trio of super-powered beings who have a fraction of Max's power, which bonds them to him. Hunted for this power he now wields, he is helped notably by The Fallen, Christy Blaze, John Lynch (Gen^{13}'s mentor) and Caitlin Fairchild, the peer leader of Gen¹³.

The ensuing journey sees Max embrace his Divine Right. He takes control of the situation, and ultimately the universe, only to face off against the WildC.A.T.S., Gen¹³, The Fallen, and even Susanna herself, as he truly tests the limits of what God can do, and how much humanity can be retained. Max does many things on his journey and became the most powerful being in the Multiverse capable of destroying it and recreating it at a whim.

== Characters ==
- Max Faraday: a 20 year old computer-science student who accidentally views the Equation and gains the powers of Divine Right.
- Susanna Chaste: Max Faraday's cyber-girlfriend.
- Devan Lawless: Max Faraday's best friend.

== Aftermath ==
After the "World's End" storyline, when Tao siphons large amounts of the Void and Providence powers to become the nihilistic god of an apocalyptic, ruined universe, John Lynch convinces Team 7 and the WildCATs to seek Max Faraday's help. Despite the assembled heroes remembering him as a slacker, good for nothing, they find him maintaining an Eternal Honeymoon dimension, a pocket dimension for the few people he managed to save from the apocalypse, where he resides torturing himself (and comforting himself at the same time) with imagery and illusions of his now dead family. Despite Lynch claims, Max claims that even his power may be not nearly enough to reverse the ruination fallen on their universe, but still hopes to be able to help.

However, when Jack Marlowe, once again empowered with the Void powers, breaches the gap between Max's paradise and the earthly plane, Tao suddenly becomes aware of Max Faraday, vowing to stop him. Still resentful with the post-human, who deliberately left out of his paradise dimension hoping that, being left in the ruined universe of Earth-50 they will likely kill themselves out, thus sparing humanity their endless battles, he reluctantly agrees to fight Tao, but only to protect his paradise dimension, channeling his anger into vision of Tao's past defeats.
