= Wildstorm: Revelations =

Comic book

Publication information
- Publisher: Wildstorm
- Schedule: Bi-weekly
- Format: limited series
- Publication date: January 2, 2008 - March 26, 2008

Creative team
- Written by: Scott Beatty; Christos Gage
- Penciller(s): Wes Craig

Collected editions
- Wildstorm: Revelations: ISBN 1-4012-1867-9

Wildstorm: Revelations is a comic book limited series, written by Scott Beatty and Christos Gage with art by Wes Craig.

After "Wildcats: Armageddon", Nemesis recruits Savant and Backlash to help her try to stop the end of the world.

Revelations was the start of a number bi-weekly series, and was followed by Number of the Beast, which resulted in the relaunch of a number of Wildstorm titles.

== Collected editions ==
The series was brought together into a trade paperback:

- Wildstorm: Revelations (144 pages, July 2008, Titan Books, ISBN 1-84576-933-3, Wildstorm, ISBN 1-4012-1867-9)
