= World War Hulk: X-Men =

Comic book miniseries

- Cover to World War Hulk: X-Men #1 drawn by Ed McGuinness

Publication information
- Publisher: Marvel Comics
- Schedule: June - August 2007
- Format: Limited series
- No. of issues: 3
- Main characters: X-Men

Creative team
- Written by: Christos Gage
- Penciller(s): Andrea Di Vito (interior art); Ed McGuiness (covers)
- Colorist: Laura Villari

World War Hulk: X-Men is a three-issue miniseries published by Marvel Comics. It is connected to the World War Hulk story arc and focuses on Professor X's involvement in the Illuminati (a secret group consisting of prominent superheroes) and the Hulk's expulsion into space. In the storyline, Xavier was not present when the decision to send the Hulk away was made by the Illuminati. As a result, the Hulk visits the X-Mansion to seek Xavier's perspective on what he would have chosen if he had been there. This part of the World War Hulk storyline occurs before, during, and after Endangered Species. The storyline explores themes of power, responsibility, and the consequences of past actions.

== Synopsis ==
Issue One: The Hulk arrives at the Xavier Institute after his announcement over Manhattan. He expresses his desire to see Professor X, but Beast refuses, leading to a confrontation. The New X-Men engage in a battle against the Hulk but are soundly defeated. Shortly after, the Astonishing X-Men join the fight. Finally, Professor X arrives, and the Hulk questions him about his stance on the decision to shoot him into space.

Issue Two: Professor X uses his telepathic abilities to delve into the Hulk's mind and witness the hardships he faced during his exile. Xavier admits that he wouldn't have supported the permanent exile of the Hulk but rather sought a cure while he was sent away. Reflecting on past mistakes that have harmed his X-Men, Xavier willingly surrenders to the Hulk. However, the Astonishing X-Men refuse to let him go without a fight. Another battle ensues, with Cyclops, Emma Frost, Wolverine, Beast, Shadowcat, Colossus, and Lockheed facing off against the Hulk. Once again, the Hulk emerges victorious. Observing the battle, the Stepford Cuckoos telepathically call for assistance from other X-Teams. While Excalibur in London hears the call, they are unable to offer aid due to the distance. Xavier's stepbrother, Cain Marko (Juggernaut), teleports to Westchester to confront the Hulk. Although Cain arrives on the battlefield, he is defeated without his full power. Soon after, X-Factor Investigations and the Uncanny X-Men arrive.

Issue Three: A third battle unfolds, involving Nightcrawler, Warpath, Hepzibah, Darwin, Multiple Man, Wolfsbane, Siryn, Monet, and Strong Guy as they join forces with members of other X-Teams to confront the Hulk. Various attempts are made to stop the Hulk, including physical attacks and sonic assaults, as well as dropping the X-Jet on him, but all efforts prove futile. Juggernaut manages to regain his full power after Cyttorak compels Cain to admit his desire to fight the Hulk rather than save his stepbrother. Juggernaut matches the Hulk blow-for-blow, but the Hulk turns Juggernaut's strength and unstoppable momentum against him. With all the X-Men defeated, the Hulk enters the school, intending to take Professor X before the Juggernaut returns. In an attempt to stop the Hulk, Mercury is thrown into the mansion's graveyard. However, Mercury manages to reason with the Hulk, sharing the events of M-Day and expressing understanding of his pain and anger based on their own experiences as mutants. The Hulk relents and departs without taking the Professor, believing that Xavier is already trapped in his own personal hell due to his own mistakes and that the X-Men have suffered enough. As the X-Men attend to the wounded, Cyclops forgives Professor X for not informing him about Vulcan, and Juggernaut leaves, advising the X-Men not to pursue him.

== Publication history ==
- June - World War Hulk: X-Men #1
- July - World War Hulk: X-Men #2
- August - World War Hulk: X-Men #3

== See also ==
- Planet Hulk
- World War Hulk
- Gamma Corps
