= World's End (comics) =

2008–2009 comic book crossover series

- Cover of WildCats vol. 3, 1 (Sept 2008), art by Neil Googe
- Publisher: Wildstorm
- Publication date: September – December 2008
- Genre: Post-apocalyptic, superhero; Crossover
Title(s)
The Authority vol. 5, #1-3
Gen^{13} vol. 6, #21-22
Stormwatch: P.H.D. #13-14
WildCats vol. 3, #1
- The Authority: World's End: ISBN 1-4012-2362-1
- Wildcats: World's End: ISBN 1-4012-2363-X
- Gen13: World's End: ISBN 1-4012-2488-1
- Stormwatch PHD: World's End: ISBN 1-4012-2489-X

"World's End" is a 2008–2009 comic book crossover storyline published by Wildstorm and taking place in the Wildstorm Universe. The event takes place in the issues of all of Wildstorm's Wildstorm Universe ongoing series.

== Publication history ==
Both flagship titles, The Authority and Wildcats, were slated to be written by Grant Morrison with Wildcats drawn by Jim Lee and The Authority drawn by Gene Ha, but the pair encountered serious delays. Only one issue of Wildcats and two of The Authority ever shipped. Eventually, amid disapproving fan reaction, both series were cancelled.

Before the announcement that Morrison's series would not continue, Christos Gage filled in with The Authority: Prime. The series shipped promptly, and Gage was hired to write a new cross-universe series Wildstorm: Armageddon. Armageddon comprised six one-shots based on six of the relaunched titles, and led into successive bi-weekly limited series Wildstorm: Revelations and Number of the Beast. These culminated in the World's End storyline, beginning July 2008, which documented worldwide catastrophe and saw several Wildstorm titles relaunched with new creative teams and a new status quo for the universe.

Wildstorm editor Ben Abernathy described this storyline as a new direction for the Wildstorm Universe:

[T]his direction evolved following our WorldStorm launch a few years ago. Looking at the landscape of the industry, we realized we needed to move our universe in a different direction, something that the “Big Two” couldn’t, or wouldn’t, do for a long period of time. And we decided that direction should be toward a sci-fi/horror direction of a post-apocalyptic setting (to a degree, an almost logical extension to where the WSU has been headed for years). There have been “visions” of a devastated, bleak future in other mainstream super-hero books, but nothing with the lasting impact or direction that the World’s End books will be tackling.

== Plot synopsis ==
=== The "How" ===
Various heroes receive a warning, purporting to be from the heroine Void, several years in the future. She shows them a post-apocalyptic world and asks them to help prevent it from coming about.

As a result of this visitation, the Kherubim warrior known as Nemesis coerces Savant and the new Backlash to research possible endings of the world. They also discover strange disappearances of various super powered heroes and villains from the World War 2 era, resulting in the investigation of various superhuman factions, usually violently. As a result Department PSI, which holds the corpse of the High, hands it over to the NOTB (Number of the Beast) program for safety.

The NOTB program is a virtual-reality network built in the 1940s from Daemonite technology. Its original purpose was to warehouse an army of posthumans from that period and train them to fight against the Apocalypse of Christian (notably Protestant) eschatology.

However, the High's corpse had already been used by Department PSI to create the Reaper ballistic missiles, whose warheads contained cloned versions of the High programmed to attack superhumans. When the High's presence in the NOTB program destabilized the whole simulation (since he had been present in the 1940s but had been missing from the scenario) and the escaped inmates were captured by the Authority, the Reapers were let loose to clean the whole mess up. However, denied easy access to their targets, the Reapers went berserk, fighting posthumans and superheroes all over the planet.

The Reapers were also designed to explode after use, as a plausible deniability measure. When they exploded in orbit they wreaked havoc on the Earth, prompting warming in the arctic regions and ice ages in the tropics, stripping away key parts of the atmosphere and starting fires that generated vast smog clouds. In addition to this, the Authority's Carrier ship crashed into London, creating a dust cloud that blocked out the sun across most of eastern Europe.

=== The "Why" ===
The origins of the disaster are unclear. Comments made by a Daemonite indicate that they originally sent the humans the technology because they intended for some disaster to happen, but how much of it was planned is unknown.

Additionally, the supervillain known as Tao was clearly prepared for the disaster as well. He had been seen preventing access to time travel and reality-altering technology and power to keep the world in its present, easily-conquerable state. He was somehow fully aware of the NOTB program and also kept captive a few thousand posthumans in five separate storage facilities around the world to seemingly be released to coincide with armageddon. To do this, Tao manipulated an old ally -- self-exiled former superhero Black Halo -- to return to superheroics to uncover the mystery of his old friend's psychosis and death. During Black Halo's investigation he and his partner Love Rocket discovered Tao's posthuman storage facilities and freed the inmates, which included a few members of DV8. In addition to his collected army of posthumans, Tao had also captured Void, which he kept as his personal prisoner and was absorbing her powers. Tao also implied that he started the armageddon.

=== The "What" ===
The Authority, despite the crash of the Carrier, remain active in London. Jenny Quarx went missing trying to contain the power source for the Carrier, and the current Doctor vanished after her. The electromagnetism of the crash disabled the Engineer's powers, the global blanket of smog limits Apollo's actions on Earth to only brief periods (since he needs sunlight to survive), and Jack Hawksmoor uses a wheelchair since there are no cities to sustain him. However, the heroes attempt to reactivate the Carrier's technology and fight off the machinations of groups who want that technology.

The WildCATs are operating from a HALO Corp building in Los Angeles. The forward planning of Hadrian, their former benefactor, means they were well-placed to survive the devastation, but they cannot make any more supplies and need to be wary of over-extending. Additionally, a legion of Daemonites has moved into Los Angeles claiming homesteading rights, while Mister Majestic, unhinged by the disaster, has set up a kingdom in Hawaii based on Kherubim social mores and technology.

From their satellite headquarters, Stormwatch has inherited the original role of the Authority: to build a "finer world". However, they can only process so many refugees and are stretched thin. Additionally, their leader Battalion has grown harsh and unyielding under the pressure.

Off the radar, Gen13 stepped through a malfunctioning teleporter before the disaster, and came out a month after its events. They continued to travel, finding shelter and sustenance in the wasteland while fighting rabid posthumans and hard-edged bands of survivors.

Large numbers of posthumans suddenly appear all over Earth, threatening the surviving human population. Meanwhile, the villains make their moves. Kaizen Gamorra prepared his nation for the disaster and now leads a veritable superpower. Tao, with his army of posthumans, plans to use them for his own ends as well as control some of Earth's most trusted heroes. Lord Defile prepares to push the WildCATs out of Los Angeles. The Night Tribes hunt the human population of Eastern Europe under the perpetual cloud cover. Sliding Albion has allied with the British government to preserve the British way of life. And in space, the Kherans make plans to conquer Earth.

== Titles ==
- Wildcats by Christos Gage, Neil Googe and Trevor Hairsine
- The Authority by Dan Abnett/Andy Lanning and Simon Coleby
- Stormwatch: Post Human Division #13 by Ian Edginton and Leandro Fernandez/Francisco Paronzini
- Gen¹³ #21 by Scott Beatty and Mike Huddleston

=== Back-ups ===
Back-up stories are told in four parts across the core titles, looking at some of the other Wildstorm characters:

1. "Lynch: One Last Thing", written by Christos Gage with artist Trevor Hairsine, featuring John Lynch
2. "Dane: Loyalties", written by Christos Gage with artist Brandon Badeaux
3. "Slayton: Gauntlet", written by Christos Gage with artist Mike McKone, featuring Marc Slayton
4. "Cybernary: Father Knows Best", written by Christos Gage with artist Pete Woods, featuring Cybernary
5. "Stalking Horse", written by Christos Gage with artist Wes Craig, featuring Miles Craven, Hotfoot and Missile-Man
6. "Get Christie Blaze", written by Christos Gage with artist Phil Noto, featuring Christie Blaze
7. "The Tao of Tao", written by Christos Gage with artist John Paul Leon, featuring Tao
8. "A Narrow Pass!" written by Russell Uttley, with artist Ben Oliver, featuring Lord Defile and Lady Decadence
9. "Into the Fire" written by Christos Gage with artist Ivan Reis, featuring Team Achilles
10. "Reunion" written by Christos Gage with artist Shawn Moll, featuring Team 7
11. "Deathblow" written by Christos Gage with artist Chris Sprouse, featuring Deathblow

== Collected editions ==
The storyline was collected into trade paperbacks:

- The Authority:
  - World's End (collects, The Authority (vol. 5) #1-7, 136 pages, DC, August 2009, ISBN 1-4012-2362-1)
  - Rule Britannia (collects, The Authority (vol. 5) #8-17, 192 pages, Titan, March 2010, ISBN 1-84856-751-0, DC, February 2010, ISBN 1-4012-2667-1)
- Wildcats:
  - World's End (collects Wildcats (vol. 5) #1-6, 136 pages, DC, August 2009, ISBN 1-4012-2363-X)
  - Family Secrets (collects Wildcats (vol. 5) #7-12, 128 pages, Titan, March 2010, ISBN 1-84856-744-8, DC, February 2010, ISBN 1-4012-2668-X
- Gen13: World's End (collects Gen13 #21-26, 136 pages, Titan, November 2009, ISBN 1-84856-613-1, DC, October 2009, ISBN 1-4012-2488-1)
- Stormwatch PHD:
  - World's End (collects Stormwatch: PHD #13-19, DC, 136 pages, October 2009, ISBN 1-4012-2489-X)
  - Unnatural Species (collects Stormwatch: PHD #20-24, 128 pages, August 2010, ISBN 1-4012-2852-6)
- Wildstorm: After the Fall (collects the back-up stories, 144 pages, January 2010, Titan, ISBN 1-84856-660-3, DC, ISBN 1-4012-2669-8)
