= Absolution (comics) =

Publication information
- Publisher: Avatar Press
- Schedule: Monthly
- Format: Limited series
- Genre: Superhero
- Publication date: July – December 2009
- No. of issues: 6 + #0

Creative team
- Created by: Christos Gage
- Written by: Christos Gage
- Artist: Roberto Viacava
- Colorist: Digikore Studios
- Editor: William A. Christensen

Absolution is a 6-issue comic book limited series written and created by Christos Gage with art by Roberto Viacava that is published by Avatar Press, launched in July 2009.

== Plot ==
In real-life police departments, officers who work in Special Victims Units must rotate out, or otherwise, they become affected by the horrible things they see in the course of their jobs. Absolution explores the idea that if police departments employed superhumans, what if they were rare enough that they were the only ones who could do their job, and stayed in that capacity for too long, becoming mentally and emotionally destabilized.

A superhero named John Dusk begins executing criminals after having seen too many horrible sights, believing they do not deserve to live because of the magnitude of their crimes.

== Sequels ==
Absolution: Rubicon is a 5-issue sequel created & written by Christos Gage with art by Daniel Gete. It was published by Avatar with the first issue dated June 2013.

Absolution: Happy Kitty #1 was written by Christos Gage with art by Paul Duffield that was also published by Avatar and dated November 2013.
