= Leandro Fernández (artist) =

Argentine comic book artist

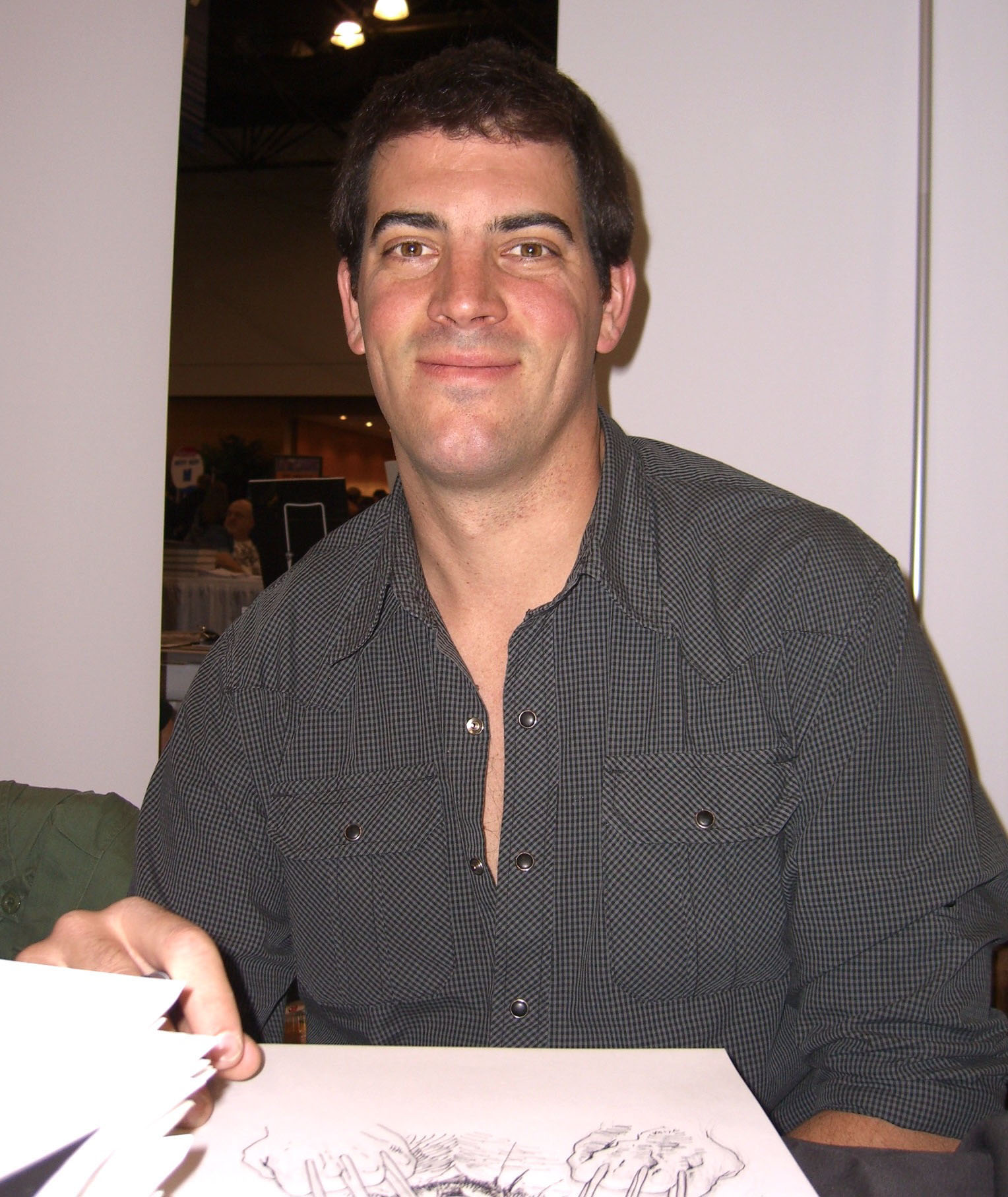
- Fernández at the New York Comic Con in Manhattan, October 10, 2010
- Area: Artist

Leandro Fernández was born in Casilda, Argentina, in 1973. He is an Argentine comic book artist, known for his work on various Marvel, Image, and Vertigo comic book titles.

== Career ==
In the early 2000s, Fernández was best known for providing the art for The Incredible Hulk, Wolverine and Spider-Man: Tangled Web series, as well as the "Operation: Crystal Ball" story arc of the Oni Press publication Queen & Country, written by Greg Rucka. In 2003, Queen & Country #8–12: "Operation: Crystal Ball" was nominated for the "Best Serialized Story" Eisner Award. The Publishers Weekly review of the Queen & Country: Volume 3: Operation: Crystal Ball trade paperback stated that "this book's pleasure lies in following the chase's twists and turns. Rucka and Fernandez accomplish this almost as well as any novel or film of the genre".

Between 2005 and 2007, Fernández illustrated several nonconsecutive story arcs for the Punisher Marvel MAX Series, written by Garth Ennis and then in 2008, he began illustrating the restarted Stormwatch: Post Human Division. In 2009 and 2010, Fernández illustrated "The Plague Widow" story arc of the Vertigo publication Northlanders, written by Brian Wood. In an interview on the series, Wood said "Leandro Fernandez, someone I've wanted to work with since seeing his work on Punisher MAX, is turning in perfect issue after perfect issue. All these books I write, with lots of details and a need for visual accuracy, are difficult for any artist to draw. He makes it look so easy".

In 2011 and 2012, Fernández illustrated several nonconsecutive New Mutants story arcs, written by Dan Abnett and Andy Lanning and published by Marvel Comics. In 2014 and 2015, Fernández illustrated the nine-issue limited series The Names, written by Peter Milligan and published by Vertigo. In an interview on the series, Milligan said "It's true that occasionally [Fernández] will try out a different way of doing something from how I've described it in the script. It's good when an intelligent and mindful artist does this, and it's even better when that artist is prepared to listen to feedback and maybe change things again. [...] Leo's always been nothing but professional, and only wants the best for the book".

Also in 2015, Fernández with Riccardo Burchielli illustrated Mad Max: Fury Road - Nux and Immortan Joe #1, written by Mark Sexton, Nico Lathouris, George Miller and published by Vertigo. Jesse Schedeen, for IGN, wrote that "this issue features four different pencillers tackling different segments. These artists work together well in terms of achieving a unified visual tone. The problem is that the comic channels little of the film's frenetic energy or sense of style". The issue was in the top twenty of the "Apple iBooks US Bestseller List - Comics & Graphic Novels" for three weeks.

In 2016, Fernández illustrated The Discipline, which was written by Peter Milligan and published by Image Comics. The Publishers Weekly review of The Discipline, Vol. 1: The Seduction trade paperback stated that "the artwork, both Fernández’s rendering and the colors by Cris Peter, are reminiscent of Hellboy and BPRD". In 2017, Fernández illustrated The Old Guard, which was written by Greg Rucka, colored by Daniela Miwa and published by Image Comics. In March 2017, Skydance Media picked up the rights to adapt the comic into a film.

In 2018, Fernández began illustrating American Carnage, which was written by Bryan Hill and published by DC Vertigo as part of DC Entertainment's relaunch of Vertigo. Jim Dandy, for Den of Geek, wrote that "Fernandez’s art is stellar. The art feels a lot like Eduardo Risso’s on the surface, but there are some subtle differences that make it stand apart: the art in American Carnage is less blocky, which I think allows for a little more subtlety in expressions and body language". American Carnage ended with issue #9 in 2019 when DC Vertigo was shut down.

In December 2019, Fernández began illustrating the second volume of The Old Guard called The Old Guard: Force Multiplied. The Old Guard film was released on Netflix in July 2020.

In 2024, Fernández began illustrating the 12-issue miniseries DC Elseworlds title Gotham by Gaslight: The Kryptonian Age, the third book in the Gotham by Gaslight series.

== Bibliography ==
- X-Factor #142 (pencils, with Bill Rosemann and inks by Dan Green, Marvel Comics, 1998)
- What If... #106 (pencils, with Tom DeFalco and inks by Robert Jones, Marvel Comics, 1998)
- Maverick #9-11 (pencils, with Jorge Gonzales and inks by Andrew Pepoy, Marvel Comics, 1998)
- Spider-Man's Tangled Web #16-17 (pencils and inks, with Daniel Way, Marvel Comics, 2002)
- Queen & Country #8-12 (with Greg Rucka, Oni Press, 2002)
- The Incredible Hulk #55-59 (with Bruce Jones, Marvel Comics, 2003)
- Wolverine #7-11 (with Greg Rucka, Marvel Comics, 2004)
- Punisher: MAX #7-12, 19–30, 37-42 (pencils, with Garth Ennis, Marvel Comics, 2004)
- Daredevil Annual #1 (pencils, with Ande Parks and Ed Brubaker and inks by Scott Koblish, Marvel Comics, 2007)
- Stormwatch: Post Human Division: Armageddon (pencils, with Christos Gage and inks by Francisco Paronzini, Wildstorm, 2008)
- Stormwatch: Post Human Division #13-24 (pencils, with Ian Edginton and inks by Francisco Paronzini, Wildstorm, 2008–2010)
- Northlanders #21-28 (with Brian Wood, Vertigo, 2009–2010)
- X-Men Origins: Deadpool #1 (with Duane Swierczynski, Marvel Comics, 2010)
- Deadpool & Cable #26 (with Duane Swierczynski, Marvel Comics, 2011)
- 5 Ronin #5 (with Peter Milligan, Marvel Comics, 2011)
- New Mutants #25-27, 38–40, 44-46 (with Dan Abnett and Andy Lanning, Marvel Comics, 2011–2012)
- Spider-Island: Deadly Hands of Kung Fu #2-3 (co-pencils with Sebastian Fiumara, with Antony Johnston and inks by John Lucas, Marvel Comics, 2011)
- Marvel Universe Vs. The Avengers #1-4 (with Jonathan Maberry, Marvel Comics, 2012–2013)
- Wolverine: MAX #7 (pencils, with Jason Starr and inks by Felix Ruiz, Marvel Comics, 2013)
- The Names #1-9 (with Peter Milligan, Vertigo, 2014–2015)
- Mad Max: Fury Road - Nux and Immortan Joe #1 (art with Riccardo Burchielli, with Mark Sexton, Nico Lathouris, George Miller, Vertigo, 2015)
- The Discipline #1-6 (with Peter Milligan, Image Comics, 2016)
- The Old Guard #1-5 (with Greg Rucka, Image Comics, 2017)
- American Carnage #1-9 (with Bryan Hill, DC Vertigo, 2018–2019)
- The Old Guard: Force Multiplied #1-5 (with Greg Rucka, Image Comics, 2019–2020)
