= Mek (comics) =

Publication information
- Publisher: Wildstorm (DC Comics)
- Schedule: Monthly
- Format: Mini-series
- Genre: Science fiction
- Publication date: January - March 2003
- No. of issues: 3
- Main character(s): Sarissa Leon

Creative team
- Written by: Warren Ellis
- Penciller(s): Steve Rolston
- Inker(s): Al Gordon
- Letterer(s): Jenny Garcia
- Colorist(s): David Baron
- Editor(s): Ben Abernathy

Mek is a three-issue comic book mini-series published in 2003 by WildStorm, written by Warren Ellis, pencilled by Steve Rolston and inked by Al Gordon.

== Publication history ==
When interviewed about Mek, Warren Ellis explained that he felt that mechanical augmentation was "already happening", quoting Stelarc and the work of Kevin Warwick as examples. In the same interview, he stated his opinion that "What is art and experiment today will be high-end consumer goods in ten years, and cheap enough to be street goods in twenty years" and that "William Gibson said it smartest: the street finds its own use for things. And what is experimental, medical or military eventually finds its way down there."

The original three issue comic book series was published from January to March 2003 by Homage Comics, an imprint of Wildstorm Comics. The series was later collected as one half of a 'flipbook' format trade paperback, accompanied by another Warren Ellis miniseries, Reload (ISBN 1401202756).

== Plot ==
The story is set in the near future, when the old fashioned styles of body modification have become passe. The newest fad, "MEK" (short for Massive Enhancement Culture), involves adding cybernetic implants, such as cell phones implanted directly into the skull. The founder of the MEK movement is Sarissa Leon, who has become a celebrity of the new fad. She returns to Sky Road, the place where MEK first took off, after learning of the murder of her former lover and fellow MEK pioneer R.J. Coins. Leon discovers that Sky Road is now the center of "bad MEK", which involves implanting black market weapons and stolen military technology. Leon attempts to find Coins' murderer, while trying to clean up Sky Road.

== Reception ==
Mek was initially met with a mixed reception - journalist Richard Johnston described the first issue as "an alright Warren Ellis book" and "not his best work but then neither is it his worst"
