= Neil Googe =

British comics artist

- Area: Artist
- Notable works: Welcome to Tranquility

Neil Googe is a British comics artist.

== Biography ==
Googe's early comics work include a Shotgun Mary mini-series and work on 2000 AD, including a number of Judge Dredd stories. In 1999, Googe was hired as the artist for a graphic novel adaptation of Konami's Silent Hill, which had been released in early 1999. The novel was scheduled for release in November 1999. Despite being completed, advertised, and even receiving an ISBN, the novel never got published due to disputes with Konami and its European branch, with only four screenshots of the novel remaining. Googe is said to have had a CD with the full, completed novel on it, but has since lost said CD.

He was one of the co-founders of the British independent comic publisher Com.x in 2000, where he wrote and drew Bazooka Jules and although only three issues were published Googe says he still has ideas for many more. However, since then he had steady work in the American comic book market since and the opportunity has never arisen.

In the American market he is known for his work on Welcome to Tranquility with Gail Simone for Wildstorm where he'd previously worked on Majestic. Following this he worked with Christos Gage on Wildcats: World's End. and then with Mike Costa on the World of Warcraft hard back graphic novel Dark Riders which was released by DC Comics after the Wildstorm merge.

After this Neil continued working with DC Comics, lending his hand more to one shot issues like Rose and Thorn, the recent Detective Comics Harley Quinn #1 issue, the Legends of the Dark Knight Harley Quinn issue and most recently The Flash. Also returning to 2000 AD to work on Survival Geeks written by Gordon Rennie and Emma Beeby.

Coming almost full circle, Neil is currently working on a creator owned project entitled Welcome to the Hood, to be launched as a pen and paper Role Playing Game and also an accompanying comic. As well as finally relaunching Bazooka Jules under the name of Bazooka Jules: Tales from Caliber Bay, though he has said this will be as a world setting for existing Role Playing Games systems with supplementary short stories in comic format. He is also working on a number of other table top and RPG products, including an as yet unnamed 3rd party Pathfinder supplement.

He has said that he will still be doing regular comic work alongside his other projects.

== Bibliography ==
Comics work includes:

- Shotgun Mary: Blood Lore (pencils, with writer Herb Mallette and inks by Kelsey Shannon, 4-issue mini-series Antarctic Press, 1997)
- Mercy Heights (with John Tomlinson):
  - "Dead of Winter" (in 2000 AD #1124, 1998)
  - "Mercy Heights Book 2" (in 2000 AD #1144-1148, 1999)
- Pulp Sci-fi: "Coy's Big Score" (with Dan Abnett, in 2000 AD #1129, 1999)
- Judge Dredd:
  - "Trial of Strength" (with John Wagner, in 2000 AD #1151-1152, 1999)
  - "War Games" (with John Wagner, in 2000 AD #1153, 1999)
  - "Mind Ripper" (with Robbie Morrison, in Judge Dredd Megazine #272, 2008)
- Bazooka Jules #1-3 (script and art, Com.x, 2001–2002)
- "Something in the Air" (with Jamie Delano, in X-Men Unlimited #41, Marvel Comics, 2003)
- Majestic #1-4, 6–8, 12–13, 15 (pencils, with author Dan Abnett/Andy Lanning, Wildstorm, 2005–2006) collected in:
  - While You Were Out (with inks by Trevor Scott, collects Majestic #1-7, 2005, ISBN 1-4012-0850-9)
  - Volume 2 (collects Majestic #8-12, 2006, ISBN 1-4012-0989-0)
  - Volume 3: Final Cut (collects Majestic #13-17 and Wildstorm Winter Special, January 2007, ISBN 1-4012-1211-5)
- "Worldstorm" (with Gail Simone, one-shot, Wildstorm, 2006)
- Welcome to Tranquility (with Gail Simone, Wildstorm, 2007–2008) collected as:
  - Volume 1 (collects Welcome to Tranquility #1-6, 160 pages, WildStorm, December 2007, ISBN 1-4012-1516-5)
  - Volume 2 (collects Welcome to Tranquility #7-12, 144 pages, WildStorm, May 2008, ISBN 1-4012-1773-7)
- Wildcats: World's End: #1-4, 6- (with Christos Gage, Wildstorm, 2008-) collected as:
  - Wildcats: World's End (136 pages, August 2009, ISBN 1-4012-2363-X)
- Aiva's Story (with writers David Noonan/Ricardo Sanchez, one-shot, Wildstorm, 2009)
- Hondo-City Justice (with Robbie Morrison, in Judge Dredd Megazine #300-303, August–November 2010)
