= Christos Gage =

American comic book writer

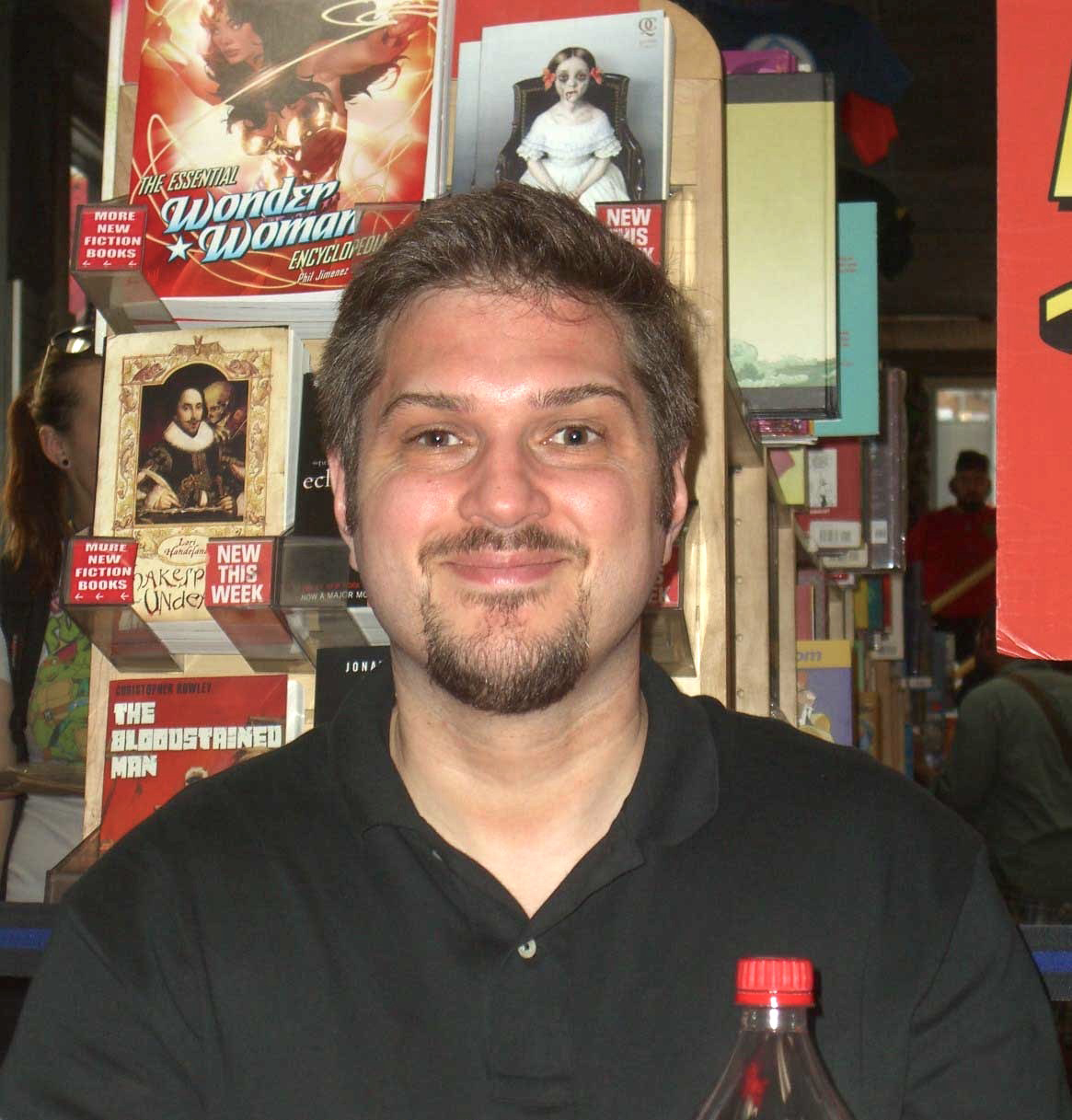
- Gage at a signing at Midtown Comics Times Square, June 21, 2010
- Born: Christos N. Gage; 1971 (age 54–55) New York City, U.S.
- Area: Writer
- Notable works: Spider-Man; Avengers; Buffy the Vampire Slayer; Stormwatch: Post Human Division

Christos N. Gage (born 1971) is an American screenwriter and comic book writer. He is known for his work on the TV series Daredevil, Hawaii Five-0, Law & Order: Special Victims Unit, Numbers and the films The Breed and Teenage Caveman. In the comics industry, he has done considerable work on the titles Angel & Faith, Avengers Academy, The Amazing Spider-Man, Gwen Stacy, The Superior Spider-Man, and Spider-Geddon, and has written tie-in books for the "Civil War" and "World War Hulk" storylines.

== Early life ==
Christos N. Gage is the son of Greek-born author and New York Times investigative journalist Nicholas Gage. His original family name is Gatzoyiannis. He was born in New York City, and grew up in Athens, Greece, and then North Grafton, Massachusetts. He attended Brown University, where he majored in American civilization. He received his MFA in Screenwriting from the AFI Conservatory.

== Career ==
=== Film and television ===
Gage, with Ruth Fletcher Gage, adapted the Arthur C. Clarke novel Rendezvous With Rama for Morgan Freeman's Revelations Entertainment. They co-wrote the 2001 film The Breed, starring Adrian Paul, Bai Ling and Bokeem Woodbine, for Sony/Screen Gems and Starz. He wrote and served as associate producer on the film Teenage Caveman for HBO; independent filmmaker Larry Clark directed and Stan Winston produced. In 2010, the Gages wrote the film Paradox, starring Kevin Sorbo, for SyFy UK.

The Gages co-wrote episodes of the TV shows Law & Order: Special Victims Unit and Numbers. SVU creator Dick Wolf cites one of their episodes from the series' fourth season, "Mercy", as "a high water mark" of the show's 400-episode run, saying "I tell writers that if you're going to look at one episode after the pilot, it's that one." The episode was nominated for a SHINE Award. In 2014 the Gages joined the writing staff of the first season of the Netflix/Marvel TV show Daredevil which was nominated for three Emmy Awards and won the Saturn Award for Best New Media TV Series. They were on the writing staff of Hawaii Five-0 for the show's ninth (2018-2019) season.

=== Comics ===
Gage broke into the comic book industry in December 2004 with the DC Comics miniseries Deadshot. One of his earliest Marvel Comics works was a Union Jack mini-series with Mike Perkins.

For Wildstorm Productions Gage wrote The Authority: Prime with Darick Robertson. His subsequent Wildstorm work included Wildstorm: Armageddon, Wildstorm: Revelations and Wildcats: Worlds End which was part of a relaunch of a number of titles.

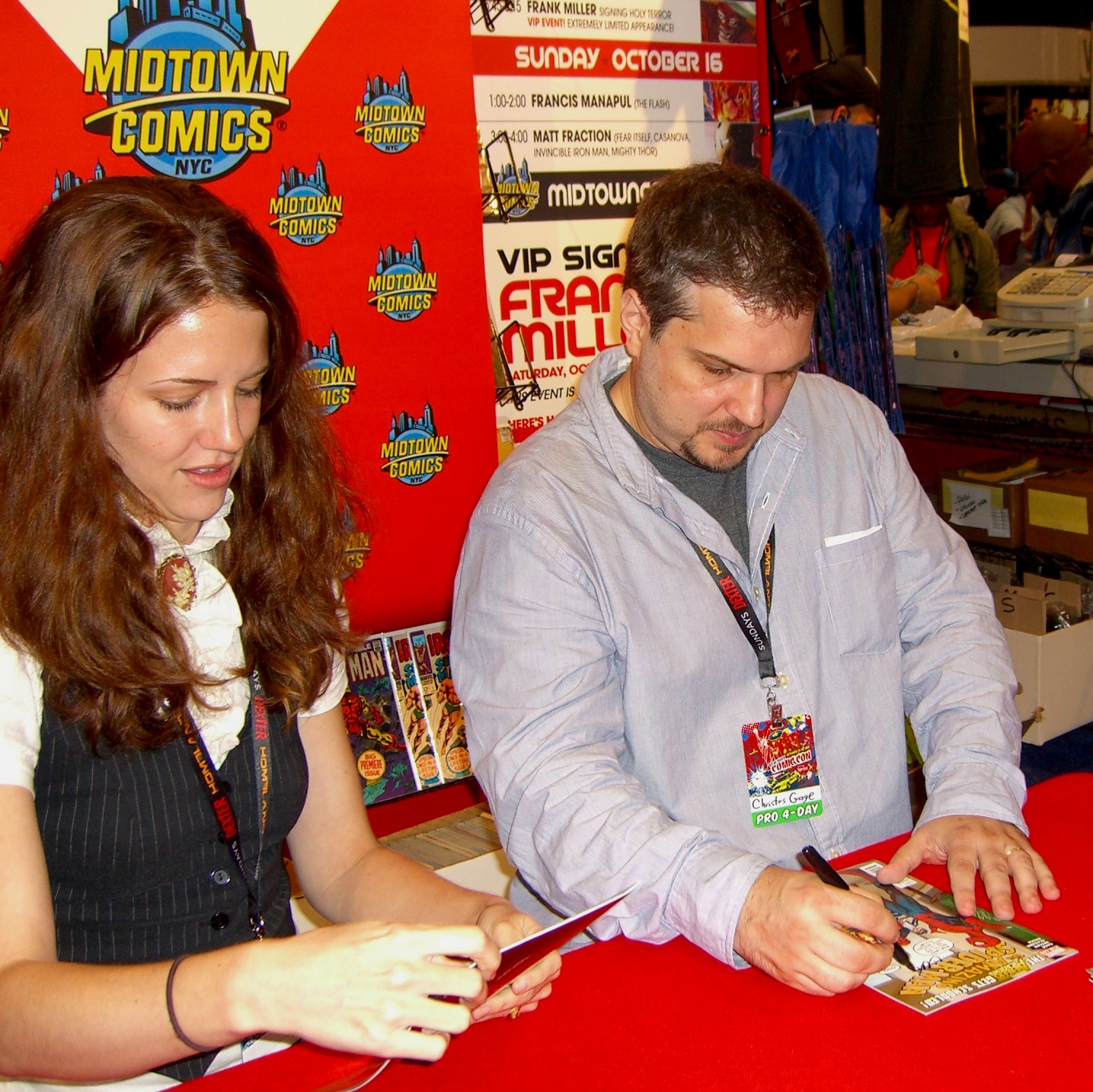
Gage with Rebekah Isaacs at the 2011 New York Comic Con.

During Marvel's "Civil War" storyline, he wrote the best-selling tie-in book Iron Man/Captain America: Casualties Of War. He also wrote the miniseries World War Hulk: X-Men whose first issue sold in excess of 85,000 copies. Gage wrote the tie-in book Avengers: The Initiative, co-writing with Dan Slott beginning with issue #8, and eventually becoming the sole writer for the series with #20. He continued on through the conclusion of the run with #35. Spinning out of that series' storylines was Avengers Academy, which Gage launched with artist Mike McKone. That series introduced several new teen characters to the Marvel Universe and ran for forty issues.

In March 2008 Gage wrote the four-issue miniseries G.I. Joe: Cobra for IDW Publishing. That same year he wrote the first seven issues of The Man with No Name for Dynamite Entertainment, which stars the iconic Western character portrayed by Clint Eastwood. The storyline is set after the events of the sequel The Good, The Bad and The Ugly. Later that year he wrote the creator-owned series Absolution for Avatar Press, which focuses on a superhero actions after he develops post-traumatic stress disorder and thus resorts to murdering supervillains.

In 2010 Gage wrote the original graphic novel Area 10, a crime thriller about an emotionally disturbed New York police detective who, while on the case of a bizarre serial killer, begins to exhibit psychic abilities after his head is impaled by a screwdriver.

In 2011 Gage was approached to write Angel & Faith, the canonical continuation of the adventures of Joss Whedon's Buffyverse characters, as part of Buffy The Vampire Slayer Season Nine. The title was nominated for a Harvey Award for Best New Series.

In July 2012 Gage published the original graphic novel Sunset, through Top Cow/Minotaur Press, a noir tale of an aged mob enforcer facing the demons of his violent past. As of 2012 Gage and his wife Ruth were working on the historical epic The Lion Of Rora for Oni Press.

From 2011 to 2013 Gage and Dan Slott co-wrote issues 661 - 662, 664 and 695 - 697 of The Amazing Spider-Man. After that series ended with the death of Peter Parker, a new series, Superior Spider-Man was launched in 2013. Gage co-wrote 10 sporadic issues with Dan Slott. He also wrote the "Inhumanity" tie-in, Inhumanity: Superior Spider-Man.

From 2013 to 2014, Gage co-wrote issues 14 - 23 of Bloodshot and H.A.R.D. Corps for Valiant Entertainment.

In 2014 Gage and Dan Slott co-wrote two of the stories in the anthologized first issue of the relaunched Amazing Spider-Man, while their collaboration on the final arc of Superior Spider-Man ranked at #3 on the New York Times Paperback Graphic Books Best Seller List. In the same year, Gage and Angel & Faith artist Rebekah Isaacs took over the Buffy The Vampire Slayer title, beginning with Season 10. The first collection of that series charted at #10 on the New York Times Best Seller List for Paperback Graphic Books, while the second collection charted at #8 and the third at #10.

He also co-wrote 2014 crossover arc Spider-Verse, and wrote the 2018 sequel Spider-Geddon.

In 2016, with his wife Ruth, Gage contributed to the Eisner Award-winning Love Is Love (comics) anthology to benefit victims of the Pulse nightclub shooting and their families.

He also wrote two series following the 2019 Disney Pixar film Incredibles 2. The Incredibles 2: Crisis in Mid-Life! & Other Stories was published on March 5, 2019, by Dark Horse Comics. Gage wrote the first two issues, while Landry Q. Walker wrote the other. The three stories happen after the film. Gage's two stories (Crisis in Mid-Life! and Bedtime Story) were illustrated by Gurihiru and J. Bone, respectively. The other series is The Incredibles 2: Secret Identities, which is a story that also takes place after the Incredibles movies by Brad Bird. The series focuses on the character Violet, and an edition with all three issues was released on October 1, 2019, again by Dark Horse Comics. Gage wrote it with Jean Claudio-Vinci as illustrator. A new series, focusing on the character Dash, was partly released in February 2020, under the title 'Slow Burn'.

=== Video games ===
Gage scripted the 2011 console video game Captain America: Super Soldier, which tied-into the release of the film Captain America: The First Avenger, which Chris Evans voiced. Evans later said the game inspired a number of the action scenes on the second Captain America movie. He also wrote scripts for the mobile games Captain America: The Winter Soldier and Iron Man 3: The Official Game. Gage also scripted the 2014 game The Amazing Spider-Man 2, as a tie-in to the film of the same name. Gage and Dan Slott are among the writers of the 2018 game Marvel's Spider-Man, developed by Insomniac Games which sold 3.3 million copies in the first three days of release and earned the writers a WGA Award nomination as well as BAFTA and SXSW award nominations. On July 18, 2019, it became the best-selling superhero game ever.

== Awards and nominations ==
- 2008 GLAAD Media Award nomination for Outstanding Comic Book (for Midnighter)
- 2012 Harvey Award nomination for Best New Series (for Angel & Faith)
- 2019 Writers Guild of America nomination for Videogame Writing Achievement (for Spider-Man)

== Personal life ==
Gage is married to Ruth Fletcher Gage, with whom he often collaborates in screenwriting projects.

== Screenwriting credits ==
=== Feature film ===
- The Breed (2001)
- Teenage Caveman (2002)

=== Television ===
- Law & Order: Special Victims Unit:
  - "Mercy" (2003)
  - "Ritual" (2004)
- Numbers: "Bones of Contention " (2005)
- Revisioned: Tomb Raider: "A Complicated Woman" (with Jim Lee, 2007)
- Paradox (2010)
- Daredevil: "Speak of the Devil" (2015)
- Hawaii Five-0:
  - "Mai Ka Po Mai Ka 'oia'i'o(Truth Comes From the Night)" (2018)
  - ""Pupuhi ka he’e o kai uli (The octopus of the deep spews its ink)" (2019)
- Arrow (TV series): "Doppelganger" (2018)

=== Video games ===
- Captain America: Super Soldier (2011)
- Iron Man 3: The Official Game (2013)
- Captain America: The Winter Soldier: The Official Game (2014)
- The Amazing Spider-Man 2 (2014)
- Marvel's Spider-Man (2018)
- Marvel's Spider-Man 2 (2023)
- Batman: Arkham Shadow (2024)
- DC: Dark Legion (2025)

== Bibliography ==
=== DC Comics ===
- Batman/Fortnite: Zero Point (6-issue miniseries, DC Comics, 2021, Pencils by Reilly Brown)
- Dante's Inferno (6-issue mini-series, DC Comics, 2010)
- Deadshot (pencils by Steven Cummings and inks by Jimmy Palmiotti, 5-issue mini-series, DC Comics, 2005)
- Legends of the Dark Knight (DC Comics):
  - #201-203: "Cold Case" (pencils by Ron Wagner and inks by Bill Reinhold, 2006)
  - #214: "Superstitious and Cowardly" (Phil Winslade, 2007)
- Worldstorm (Doug Mahnke, 2-issue mini-series, Wildstorm, 2006–2007)
- Stormwatch: Post Human Division #1-12 (Wildstorm, 2006-2007) collected as:
  - Volume 1 (Doug Mahnke, tpb collects #1-4 & 6–7, July 2007, ISBN 978-1-4012-1500-2)
  - Volume 2 (with Matthew Dow Smith and Andy Smith, collects #5 and #8-12, April 2008, ISBN 1-4012-1678-1)
- Midnighter #8 (with John Paul Leon, Wildstorm, June 2007)
- New Line Cinema's House of Horror #1 (DC Comics, September 2007)
- The Authority: Prime (with Darick Robertson, Wildstorm, 2007, tpb collects The Authority Vol. 4 #5-11, Titan Books, August 2008, ISBN 1-84576-861-2, Wildstorm, July 2008, ISBN 1-4012-1834-2)
- Wildstorm: Armageddon (various artists, 6-issues, Wildstorm, tpb, April 2008, ISBN 1-4012-1703-6)
- Wildstorm: Revelations (co-author Scott Beatty, and art by Wes Craig, Wildstorm, 2008, tpb, July 2008, Titan Books, ISBN 1-84576-933-3, Wildstorm, ISBN 1-4012-1867-9)
- Wildcats: World's End #1-18 (with Neil Googe and Trevor Hairsine, Wildstorm, 2008–2009) collected as:
  - Wildcats: World's End (August 2009, ISBN 1-4012-2363-X)

=== Marvel Comics ===
- World War Hulk: X-Men #1-3 (with Andrea Di Vito, mini-series, Marvel Comics)
- Union Jack (with pencils by Mike Perkins and inks by Drew Hennessy, 4-issue mini-series, November 2006 - February 2007, Marvel Comics, tpb London Falling, July 2007, ISBN 0-7851-2181-1)
- Annihilation: Conquest - Quasar (with Mike Lilly, Marvel Comics, September–December 2007, tpb, January 2008, 96 pages, ISBN 0-7851-2718-6)
- Avengers:
  - House of M: Avengers (with Mike Perkins, 5-issue limited series, Marvel Comics, November 2007)
  - Avengers: The Initiative #8-35 (with co-author Dan Slott and art by Stefano Caselli and Harvey Montecillo Tolibao, Marvel Comics, 2008–2010)
  - Avengers Academy #1-39 (with Mike McKone, ongoing series, Marvel Comics, June 2010–January 2013)
  - Marvel's Avengers: Road to A-Day (112 pages, Marvel Comics, 2020, 978-0-7851-9465-1) collects:
    - Marvel's Avengers: Black Widow (one-shot, 2020)
- Thunderbolts: Secret Invasion (168 pages, Marvel Comics, March 2009, ISBN 0-7851-2394-6) collects:
  - "Breaking Point" (with Brian Denham, one-shot, January 2008)
  - "International Incident" (with Ben Oliver, one-shot, February 2008)
  - "Reason in Madness" (with Ben Oliver, one-shot, May 2008)
  - "Running the Asylum" (with Fernando Blanco, 4-issue Secret Invasion tie-in, Thunderbolts #122-125, September–December, 2008)
- Civil War: House of M (with Andrea Di Vito, 5-issue mini-series, Marvel Comics, September 2008)
- Iron Man: Director of SHIELD #33-35: "War Machine: Director of SHIELD" (with Sean Chen, Marvel Comics, 2008)
- X-Men/Spider-Man (with art by Mario Alberti, 4-issue mini-series, Marvel Comics, 2008–2009)
- House of M: Masters of Evil (with art by Manuel Garcia, 4-issue mini-series, Marvel Comics 2009–2010)
- X-Men Legacy* #260.1 - 275, 300 (ongoing, Marvel Comics, January 2012–October 2012)
- Spider-Man:
  - Spider-Man/Fantastic Four (with art by Mario Alberti, 4-issue mini-series, Marvel Comics, 2010)
  - Superior Spider-Man: #6 AU (Age of Ultron Crossover, Mar 27, 2013)
  - Spider-Geddon #1-5 (with Jorge Molina, 5-issue mini-series, 2018 tpb, February 2019 200 pages, ISBN 978-1302914752)
  - Superior Spider-Man Vol. 2 #1-12 (with Mike Hawthorne, 2018-2019)
  - The Superior Spider-Man Returns #1 (with Dan Slott, Ryan Stegman, Humberto Ramos, Giuseppe Camuncoli, and Mark Bagley, 2023)
  - Superior Spider-Man Vol. 3 #5-6, 7 (with Dan Slott and Mark Bagley, 2024)
- Iron Man 2020 #1-6 (with Dan Slott, 2020)
- Machine Man 2020 #1-2 (with Tom DeFalco, 2020)
- Gwen Stacy #1-5 (with Todd Nauck, 2020-2022)

=== Independent Comics ===
- The Man with No Name: The Good, The Bad, and The Uglier (with Wellington Dias, Dynamite Entertainment, 2008)
- Absolution (with Roberto Viacava, Avatar Press, August 2009, ongoing)
- G.I. Joe: Cobra (with co-author Mike Costa and art by Antonio Fuso, 4-issue mini-series, IDW Publishing, March 2009)
- Sunset (graphic novel, Minotaur Press, July 2012)
- Buffy the Vampire Slayer Season Nine: Angel & Faith #1-25 (with Rebekah Isaacs, Dark Horse Comics, August 2011 - August 2013)
- Buffy the Vampire Slayer Season Nine: Willow: Wonderland #3-5 (with co-author Jeff Parker, pencils by Brian Ching, Dark Horse Comics, January 2013 - March 2013)
- Bloodshot and H.A.R.D. Corps #14-23 (with co-authors Joshua Dysart and Duffy Boudreau, Valiant Entertainment, September 2013 - May 2014)
- Buffy the Vampire Slayer Season Ten #1- (with Rebekah Isaacs, Dark Horse Comics, March 2014 -)
- Incredibles 2: Crisis in Mid-Life! & Other Stories (with Landry Q. Walker, Dark Horse Comics, March 2019)
- Incredibles 2: Secret Identities #1-3 (Dark Horse Comics, October 2019)
- Incredibles 2: Slow Burn #1-3 (Dark Horse Comics, July 2020)

Preceded by Warren Ellis	Thunderbolts writer 2008	Succeeded by Andy Diggle
Preceded by Warren Ellis	Astonishing X-Men writer 2011 (with Daniel Way)	Succeeded by James Asmus
Preceded by Mike Carey	X-Men: Legacy writer 2012	Succeeded by Simon Spurrier
