= Stormwatch: Post Human Division =

- Cover of the first issue

Publication information
- Publisher: WildStorm
- Schedule: Monthly
- Format: Ongoing series
- Genre: Superhero
- Publication date: November 2006 – November 2007 (#1-12); August 2008 — 2009 (#13-24)
- No. of issues: 24
- Main character(s): John Doran; Fahrenheit; Paris; Gorgeous; The Monstrosity; Black Betty; The Machinist; Jackson King

Creative team
- Created by: Christos Gage; Doug Mahnke
- Written by: Ian Edginton
- Penciller: Leandro Fernandez
- Inker: Francisco Paronzini

Collected editions
- Volume 1: ISBN 1-4012-1500-9
- Volume 2: ISBN 1-4012-1678-1
- World's End: ISBN 1-4012-2489-X

Stormwatch: Post Human Division is an American comic book published by Wildstorm comics. It is the fourth volume to bear the name Stormwatch. It was first published in November 2006 and was written by Christos Gage with art by Doug Mahnke.

The series ended after issue #12, but restarted in August 2008 as a part of the World's End event with issue #13.

== Overview ==
The series departs from previous incarnations in some ways, most notably its urban setting. Characters that were killed during the Aliens/Wildcats one-shot are subsequently resurrected and brought back to life while others are newly introduced. Stormwatch Prime has been reconstituted as the United States' superhuman crisis response team, but a splinter team operates out of a branch office in New York. Entitled Stormwatch: Post Human Division (P.H.D.), they are underfunded and overworked, their mission is to find "cost-effective" methods of saving the day.

== Characters ==
The series follows the branch office as Stormwatch leader, former Weatherman Jackson King, tries to defeat superhuman menaces and balance the tight budget. The team assembled by King consists of:

- John Doran, the team's leader, an NYPD officer who displayed incredible courage and insight which allowed him to survive a post human battle. He was also chosen as he represents the ordinary human being on the team.
- Fahrenheit a.k.a. Lauren Pennington, moved from Stormwatch Prime after injuries caused her to temporarily lose her powers.
- Paris a.k.a. Liam Mendoza, a former Stormforce soldier with a natural aptitude to identify his opponents' weak points.
- Gorgeous a.k.a. Wanda Durst, a master manipulator and former moll to supervillains.
- Black Betty a.k.a. Elizabeth Rowan, a former apprentice to a sorcerer named Jeremiah Cain.
- The Monstrosity a.k.a. Dr. Mordecai Shaw, forensics expert, shape-shifting human-alien hybrid and reluctant ex-supervillain.
- The Machinist a.k.a. Dino Manolis, an ex-supervillain and technology expert.

== Storylines ==
=== Formation ===
As seen in the Worldstorm preview (6 pages) and issues #1-4, #6-7 art by Doug Mahnke. Also revealed is some of the past of Paris. He was the abused child in a family that ran a dog fighting ring. He was responsible for feeding the dogs and was the only one that treated them kindly. They recognized this and defended him later murderous friends and family.

=== Resurrections ===
Issue #5, "Talking to the King," with art by Matthew Dow Smith.

The story details the return of some of the members of Stormwatch thought killed in WildC.A.T.s/Aliens.

It is revealed, through flashbacks, that Jackson King got the idea to restart Stormwatch Prime after fending off a superhuman attack by old foes during his wedding to Christine Trelane. He sells the President of the United States on the idea of funding the organization as a new superhuman crisis response team answering only to the U.S. as a countermeasure against eventualities such as the Authority attempting another government overthrow.

Realizing that the new Stormwatch Prime will not succeed without "the big guns," King is approached by the current Doctor who believes he can rescue Winter from the Sun (revealing the events of Scorched Earth to an angered King in the process). The Doctor is able to rescue Winter's consciousness and transfer it into a younger, cloned body. In doing so, he inexplicably rescues Fahrenheit, Fuji and Hellstrike who were somehow 'linked to Winter's soul on a quantum level.' A scan of Fahrenheit's memories reveals that a mysterious armored figure is responsible for saving the four heroes, saying they will be needed later.

The issue also hints that the events of The Monarchy starring King and Trelane were all a drug induced hallucination caused by the previous Doctor.

=== Who Shot Jackson King? ===
Issues #8-9 with art by Andy Smith. A meet-and-greet with Stormwatch Prime goes bad with the seeming murder of Jackson King.

=== Death in the Family ===
Issues #10-12 with art by Andy Smith. The team's headquarters is attacked. Unfortunately many police officers are slain in the explosion. The team works together to defeat the organization that attacked them.

=== Breach of Trust ===
This took place during The Authority: Prime limited series.

=== Vision of Armageddon ===
The fifth part of the Wildstorm: Armageddon crossover focused on Stormwatch: PHD. It featured art from penciller Leandro Fernandez and inker Francisco Paronzini.

John Doran is brought to post-apocalypse Earth by Void. There he encounters Fahrenheit who explains to him the fates of each member of PHD. Paris retreated to his nature preserve to look after his animals and kill any poachers foolish enough to trespass. Black Betty took her family inside of the comatose Jeramiah Cain's home and transported the brownstone to another dimension. Gorgeous has returned to her old ways of leaning on a man to look after her, in this case the Monstrosity; the two seem to be the picture of love. The Machinist has become a virtual god for being able to return the power to Raleigh, North Carolina. John himself has died, going down fighting.

The two are then teleported to the newly built Skywatch III space station where they are met by a bearded and armored Jackson King. After scans verify John's identity, King explains how the funding for the station opened up after the incident involving the bunker and how his powers have grown since being shot in the head. He outlines his plan to rebuild the world, better than before, to which John muses that King sounds like the Authority or Henry Bendix. King refutes this.

Void reappears to return John to the present. After they're gone a technician reports to King that they have analyzed her temporal signature. The image of him overlooking the Earth mirrors the image of the shadowy figure seen in issue #5. Back in the present John meets with the non-powered members of his team and begins to tell them what they should do to avenge him.

=== World's End ===
As part of the World's End storyline, a number of titles were re-launched and one of those was Stormwatch: Post Human Division, with the writer Ian Edginton and the Armageddon art team. It restarted in issue #13 dated August 20, 2008.

In the aftermath of Number of the Beast, Jackson King is once again holding the title of Weatherman, running Stormwatch from the new Skywatch equipped with solar sails "in high orbit. Out of the reach of vacuum-capable 'supers,' yet close enough to still use the teleport." The latest incarnation of Stormwatch Prime consists of Christine Trelane, Link, Winter, Fuji, Fahrenheit, the now-virtually immortal Deathblow and Flint who abandoned Team Achilles after their successful return from an alternate universe to assist her former teammates during armageddon.

The High is also shown escorting survivors into one of the last safe heavens on Earth, Finland established in Stormwatch: Team Achilles as a place where posthumans aren't allowed.

The series ended with Issue #24 with the beginning of the "Red Blade" Story Arc which concluded in the pages of WildC.A.T.S.

== Collected editions ==
The series has been collected in the following trade paperback:

- Volume 1 (collects Worldstorm #1 and Stormwatch: Post Human Division #1-4 and 6–7, 160 pages, July 2007, ISBN 1-4012-1500-9)
- Volume 2 (collects Stormwatch: Post Human Division #5 and 8–12, 144 pages, April 2008, ISBN 1-4012-1678-1)
- Volume 3: World's End (collects Stormwatch: PHD #13-19, 136 pages, DC, October 2009, ISBN 1-4012-2489-X, Titan, November 2009, ISBN 1-84856-478-3)
- Volume 4: Unnatural Species (collects Stormwatch: PHD #20-24, 128 pages, August 2010, ISBN 1-4012-2852-6)
