= Gen13 =

American fictional superhero team and comic book series

- Cover to Gen^{13} vol. 4, #1 (2006) by Talent Caldwell

Group publication information
- Publisher: WildStorm (Image Comics, later DC Comics)
- First appearance: Deathmate: Black (September 1993)
- Created by: Jim Lee; Brandon Choi; J. Scott Campbell

In-story information
- Base(s): La Jolla, California
- Member(s): Caitlin Fairchild; Grunge (comics)

Gen^{13}
- : Cover to Gen^{13} vol. 2, #6 (1995). Art by Jim Lee and Scott Williams

Series publication information
- Schedule: Monthly
- Format: (vol. 1); Limited series (vols. 2–4); Ongoing series
- Publication date: (vol. 1); Feb. – Sept. 1994 (vol. 2); Mar. 1995 – July 2002 (vol. 3); Sept. 2002 – Feb. 2004 (vol. 4); Oct. 2006 – Feb. 2011
- Number of issues: (vol. 1); 5 (plus #½) (vol. 2); 80 (plus #-1, three annuals) (vol. 3); 17 (vol. 4); 39
- Creator(s): Jim Lee; Brandon Choi; J. Scott Campbell

Gen^{13} is a superhero team and comic book series originally written by Jim Lee and Brandon Choi and illustrated by J. Scott Campbell. It was published by WildStorm under the Image Comics banner, which went on to become an imprint for DC Comics, who continued publishing the Gen^{13} title. The comic features a loosely organized team of super-powered beings composed of five teenagers and their mentor.

== Development ==
Ad for the book under its original planned title of Gen X prior to Marvel Comics' trademark of Generation X which forced a retitle to Gen^{13}.

In the early 1990s, colleagues and childhood friends Brandon Choi and Jim Lee were discussing the various superhero team comic book across the various publishers, with both realizing that a team book prominently featuring a group of teenagers had not been published since The New Mutants (a decade prior). Lee had just read DC Comics' Legionnaires which served as the impetus for the direction Lee wanted to take as he felt focusing on more youthful group of heroes would differentiate itself from grimmer and more cynical material of the time such as Wildcats and Youngblood. Choi began working on Lee's character designs with J. Scott Campbell who had been with Lee's studio for two weeks after being hired through a talent search. Another point to add differentiation from other books of the time was to make Caitlin Fairchild the lead character which at the time was considered a gamble due to a mindset within the toy and comics industry that female characters were not marketable or sellable to the core audience which the robust sales for the series managed to counter. While Campbell acknowledged the presence of tropes like shadowy government conspiracies in the initial Gen^{13} miniseries, the team's intention going forward in keeping with their desired approach would be more adventure based taking thematic and tonal inspiration from the works of George Lucas of Steven Spielberg. Initially, the book was intended to be called Gen X with the team featuring that name in their first appearance in the Valiant Comics and Image Comics Crossover limited series Deathmate, but due to Marvel Comics having trademarked the name Generation X for their upcoming book of the same name, the intended August 1993 release was cancelled and the series and team rebranded as Gen^{13}, in reference to Generation X being the 13th born in the United States since the American Revolution.

== Publication history ==
The series takes place in Jim Lee's Wildstorm Universe, and Gen^{13}'s stories and history intertwine with those from his own works, such as Wildcats and Team 7 (in fact, each of the main characters in Gen^{13} is the child of a Team 7 member).

The setup of the series is that a group of teens are invited to take part in a government project, which is in actuality a prison-like testing ground on "gen-active" teens. The teens make their escape, but not before they manifest superhuman powers, and are labelled dangerous fugitives. They rely on each other to fight their foes and unveil the personal secrets that linked them to Team 7 and International Operations.

After a very successful run ending with issue #20, co-creator and illustrator J. Scott Campbell handed the reins of Gen^{13} over to other creative teams, saying that leaving freed him up to work on both the Gen^{13}/Batman crossover and his own new series (Danger Girl).

Following the run of Choi and Campbell were John Arcudi and Gary Frank. Their realistic style, both in writing and art, was a drastic change from the title's more fantastic elements. Following their run, Scott Lobdell returned the title to its less-serious, more-sexual roots, but still the title was not received well by fans.

After Lobdell's run, Adam Warren was assigned to the title. He had previously proven himself writing two stories using Gen^{13} characters ("Grunge: The Movie," published in Gen^{13} Bootleg, and the standalone mini-series Magical Drama Queen Roxy), as well as a two-issue fill-in piece featuring a pop idol who threatened to take over the world with a catchy song. Warren's run was well received by fans and critics, but sales did not support the title.

Despite outrageous story arcs and many artist collaborations, the popularity of the book dwindled to the point where Wildstorm decided to blow up the entire team with a six-megaton bomb (Gen^{13} vol. 2, #76, June 2002). This served as the catalyst to revamp the series with a new first issue written by Chris Claremont with pencils by Ale Garza. This title featured an all new team mentored by Caitlin Fairchild, and spawned a spin-off series titled 21 Down. However, this title was cancelled after barely a year. The final issue of the series revealed that the original team was, in fact, still alive, and that the new series had taken place in an alternate dimension which had in some fashion crossed over with the known continuity.

During the height of its popularity, Gen^{13} spawned two spin-off books, DV8 and Gen^{13} Bootleg, as well as a number of specials and mini-series. The team also starred in crossovers with other comic book characters such as Superman, Spider-Man, the Maxx, Monkeyman and O'Brien, two crossovers with the Marvel Comics teen hero team Generation X, and a crossover with the Fantastic Four. At one point in the early years, Wildstorm and DC were planning a teamup between the team and Batman. However, due to creative differences between creator Brandon Choi and DC, the crossover never happened, although J. Scott Campbell did create artwork showing Fairchild, Grunge, Roxy and Batman in a promotional image.

The title was "rebooted" in October 2006, initially written by Gail Simone with art from Talent Caldwell. At first, the title had no continuity with earlier series. The series was involved in the "Armageddon" crossover event and then taken over in 2008 with a new creative team, Scott Beatty and Mike Huddleston, as part of "World's End".

The new series was canceled along with the rest of the Wildstorm titles published at the time when the line folded. When the Wildstorm universe was subsequently folded into the DC Universe following Flashpoint, several of the members of Gen 13 began appearing in other titles. Caitlin Fairchild played a supporting role in Superboy and eventually began starring in the spin-off title The Ravagers.

== Fictional team history ==
=== The original Gen^{13} ===
International Operations started "government internship" for gifted youths, taking place in an isolated training facility. Following the manifestation of Caitlin Fairchild's powers, she fled the complex with Roxy Spaulding, Grunge, Burnout and Threshold in disguise. They were later joined by Sarah Rainmaker. The project was revealed to be a gathering of the gen-active progeny of Team 7.

Threshold tricked the group, sans Fairchild, to return to base to help free the other kids, but upon their return they were apprehended for further testing. With the help of Pitt and John Lynch, the kids finally escaped. The group retreated to La Jolla, California, and officially formed as the group Gen^{13}. They opposed I.O. and their violent counterpart, DV8. ("Gen^{13}" loosely refers to the 13th generation of Americans. Team 7 had been part of a project called Gen12.)

The team spent a lot of time delving into the past of Team 7 to learn more about themselves. Fairchild and Freefall learned they were half-sisters and Lynch was revealed to be Burnout's father. Also during this time, Freefall and Grunge began to date, while Rainmaker revealed herself to be bisexual.

The team was caught in an explosion of a six-megaton bomb and believed to be dead. Fairchild was the only survivor and mentored a new Gen^{13} team, effectively taking Lynch's role. However, this team existed in what is later revealed to be an alternate reality which was similar to the mainstream Wildstorm universe except for its point of divergence, the last issue of Gen^{13} volume 2. At the end of volume 3, the rest of the original Gen^{13} team was revealed to be alive and, after time-traveling to avoid the detonation that "killed" them, the reunited group returned to the mainstream Wildstorm universe.

=== Wildstorm ===
In early 2006, Wildstorm brought all its in-continuity comics since WildC.A.T.s #1 to an end. The universe's finale came in the form of the crossover miniseries Captain Atom: Armageddon. Following the conclusion of this limited series, the entire Wildstorm line was relaunched with "Worldstorm." A new Gen^{13} series began. The entire world had a "soft reset"; the surroundings were mostly familiar, but there were changes throughout.

In the first arc, the future Gen^{13} are taken away from their home lives. It is revealed that their parents have been assigned to raise the children to encourage the emergence of specific personality traits. In different areas of the country, Caitlin Fairchild, Roxy Spaulding, Eddie Chang, Bobby Lane and Sarah Rainmaker wake up, each wearing a uniform recognized by their parents. Strike teams immediately attempt to capture the kids; many of their foster parents are terminated.

In the course of the series, it is eventually revealed that (in contrast to the previous iterations) these Gen^{13}s were manipulated and formulated from birth by an unscrupulous biogenetics firm from I.O., called Tabula Rasa. Furthermore, the "souls" of the previous iterations of the Gen^{13}s, previously collected by the Authority's Doctor, have settled into these bodies, and when the five of them are together, they cause people to forget their previous history, even those who knew them.

As a result of these new origins, the personalities, histories and abilities of each character have displayed mild-to-massive differences from the previous canon. For instance, Burnout is now a former juvenile hall-resident-turned-reggae-loving pacifist, and John Lynch is a young grunt in I.O.'s employ. Rainmaker is retconned into being a lesbian rather than bisexual, Fairchild is suspicious and unhappy about her excessive beauty, and Grunge is portrayed as being secretly more intelligent than even Caitlin. Outside of her newfound origins, the character of Freefall remains mostly consistent to previous iterations, save for a slightly greater level of confidence and self-reliance.

=== World's End ===
The series resumes following Number of the Beast as part of the "World's End" storyline, with the group coming out of a teleportation system in which they had been held (due to power loss) into a devastated New York approximately six months following the events of Number of the Beast.

Once they reach the surface from the underground lair, the group is shocked to see what has happened in New York (aside from Burnout, who is blind at this point). While Grunge is quick to claim that an asteroid, global warming, and other natural disasters were responsible for the destruction, Rainmaker blames terrorists. After a confrontation with several crazed metahuman-hunters, the group finally manages to escape New York.

Once outside of New York, the group finds themselves trapped in a mall with several mutated monsters, one of which seemingly infects Fairchild. While the group is holding together, tensions have begun to rise between Fairchild and Rainmaker, with the latter being attracted to the first. Burnout, while still blind, gains some semblance of vision with the ability to sense heat patterns.

During their stay at a skater park run by teens, Grunge is crowned king. He is originally thrilled about it but later finds out that his predecessor is to be eaten in a soup. Rainmaker, having witnessed Caitlin and Bobby kiss in a tent, grabs her gear and leaves the group without saying goodbye to anyone.

The other teens are confronted by the cloned scientist Dr. Cross, who created them after their original deaths; however, he and his assistant Megan are both stuck at ages five and nine, respectively, due to the loss of electricity caused by the cataclysm, while retaining their memories and intellects. They manage to save Grunge and to overpower the heavily armed children-scientists due to the intervention of Goo, a Gen14. As they flee, it is revealed that Caitlin's power has failed, most probably due to the infection, and she suffers a serious knife injury.

Having nowhere else to go, they join the children-scientists, who promise to heal Caitlin. They arrive in a small town that is under the "protection" of a World War II supervillain team, the Fearsmiths (the imprisoned villains from Number of the Beast). The two groups clash, with Gen^{13} being easily beaten. Following another defeat, they are separated from Fairchild and the scientists as they are abducted by the Paladins, who offer to train them.

Unknown to any them, Goo was sent by the remnants of the U.S. military—specifically a branch who specialized in fighting metahumans. The squad was designed to apprehend Gen^{13} and have accordingly been practicing on a small group of Gen14s, of which Goo is a member. Naturally, their practice sessions ended with the Gen14s being killed, cloned, and their minds transferred and later modified so that they do not remember their ordeal. Oddly enough, Goo seems to be regaining some of her memories.

Currently on orders from the general in charge of the military squad, Gen14 has invaded the Paladins' headquarters and are ready to confront Gen^{13}, which currently consists only of Burnout, Grunge and Freefall.

The fight between the gen-actives and the military branch is over quickly with the Gen14 and military winning. Once they have been captured, Gen^{13} are offered an ultimatum: either join the military and serve them or be executed. In order to prove his point, the general shoots and kills Gen14's Windsprint. His plans, however, are crossed by Roxy, who levitates the Paladin base into space, knocking them all out due to oxygen deprivation.

In the meantime, Caitlin has fully mutated due to the Warhol virus to which she was exposed and is rampaging across town in a Hulk-like fashion. Her rampage is cut short as the Paladin base crash-lands next to her. The gen-actives band together and take on Caitlin, hoping to calm her down, but they do not succeed. Seeing no alternative, Goo sacrifices herself in order to short-circuit the virus, thus reverting Caitlin to her former self.

Three weeks later, Bobby, Roxy, Grunge, Caitlin and the surviving Gen14s Runt and Ditto arrive at Tranquility (a town of retired super-heroes), only to find a crater where the town had been. The group decides not to despair and to go on even if it means that are heading into trouble.

=== The New 52 ===
Following the New 52 continuity reboot, Gen^{13} briefly debuts in the epilogue of Supergirl issue #33; membership consists of the original lineup.

== Characters ==
The original lineup of Gen^{13} was:

- Caitlin Fairchild: Once an ordinary girl, Caitlin's muscles spontaneously increased in density, granting her superhuman strength, agility, speed and endurance. She is later revealed to be Freefall's half-sister. Caitlin is often portrayed as being either naively unaware of or mildly uncomfortable with her larger body.
- Bobby "Burnout" Lane: Son of John Lynch (Gen^{13}'s mentor), Bobby manifested the ability to generate and manipulate high-energy coherent plasma, which ignites on exposure to oxygen. He later developed the ability to fly as well as certain psionic abilities.
- Roxanne "Freefall" Spaulding: "Roxy" is the youngest gen-active teen, with the ability to control the effects of gravity on herself and on others. She can nullify gravity (and float) or multiply it (making objects heavy). It is also suggested by some other characters that if she thought about it and used her powers to their fullest advantage, she could manipulate spacetime as this is related to gravity. She has a crush on Grunge and is jealous of Fairchild's physique. Keeps Queelocke as a "pet." It was later revealed that Spaulding and Fairchild were half-sisters, both the daughters of Alex Fairchild from Team 7.
- Sarah Rainmaker: Rainmaker can influence local weather systems, manipulating air currents to grant herself flight and direct water with a gesture. Amplifier bands on her wrists augment her ability to project lightning. Rainmaker is Apache and is Stephen Callahan's daughter and Threshold and Bliss' half-sister. Among the main characters, she is the most concerned with social and political issues. The rest of the team is still adjusting to her sexual orientation (she is attracted to women).
- Percival Edmund "Grunge" Chang: Able to mimic the molecular structure of any material he touches (and partially bestow this effect on others), Grunge is a surf rat who enjoys sleeping late. He possesses brown belts in five martial arts styles and has few if any redeeming characteristics—though he does possess a photographic memory that allowed him to take the same classes as Fairchild does (much to her surprise) during the period that the team went to college. His father is Team 7 member Phillip Chang.
- John Lynch: The team's mentor and father of Robert "Burnout" Lane. Lynch was the leader of Team 7 and close friend of the children's parents. His eye has been replaced after he gouged it out as a result of a mental attack. Like all surviving members of Team 7, Lynch was granted powerful telepathic and telekinetic abilities that are highly unstable and dangerous. Because of this, he avoids using his powers if at all possible.
- Anna: A heavily armed covert-assassination gynoid programmed to serve Gen^{13} as a maid and to love them as her own children.

The team recently added newcomers:

- Holly "Breakdown" Denton: Occasionally known as Goo, Holly has the ability to disassemble molecules, seemingly causing objects to melt into goo. She was formerly a member of Gen14. Holly sacrifices herself to save Caitlin, but is shown to have been cloned.
- Amber "Ditto" LeRoux: Not much is known about Amber, only that Holly refers to her as a typical airhead. A former Gen14. Her power is infinite multiplicity which allows her to make an unlimited number of copies of herself.
- Guillermo "Runt" Sandoval: Not much is known about Guillermo. A former Gen14. His powers allow him to grow and shrink.
- Lance "Hardbody" Wieder: The second-in-command of the former Gen14. Not much is known about him at this point; during a fight between him and Gen^{13}, his face was scarred by Holly, who was defending herself. He and Windsprint were left behind in order to recover. His powers include augmented strength/stamina and increased dermal density which makes him super-strong and near-invulnerable. Doctor Cross (the maker of the current Gen program) expressed interest in potential offspring between him and Caitlin Fairchild.
- Shaqira "Windsprint" Johnson: The speedster of Gen14. She was shot in the head by a crazed general and believed to be dead. However, it is revealed that her enhanced physiology also included a heightened metabolism allowing her to survive the gunshot. She and Hardbody had been originally left behind in order to recuperate.

== Collected editions ==
There have been a number of trade paperbacks collecting the Gen^{13} comic books, spin-off series, limited series and specials.

Title	Material collected	Publication date	ISBN
Archives	Gen^{13} #1–5; Gen^{13} vol. 2, #1–13C	April 1998	978-1887279918
Collected Edition	Gen^{13} #1–5	March 1996	1-56389-496-3
Who They Are and How They Came to Be	Gen^{13} #1–5	September 2006	1-4012-1149-6
Starting Over	Gen^{13} vol. 2, #1–7	August 1999	1-56389-544-7
#13 A, B & C Collected Edition	Gen^{13} vol. 2, #13A–13C	November 1997	978-1887279666
I Love New York	Gen^{13} vol. 2, #25–29	September 1999	1-56389-543-9
We'll Take Manhattan	Gen^{13} vol. 2, #45–50	October 2000	1-56389-662-1
Meanwhile...	Gen^{13} vol. 2, #43–44, 66–70	2003	1-4012-0062-1
Superhuman Like You	Gen^{13} vol. 2, #60–65	March 2002	1-56389-877-2
September Song	Gen^{13} vol. 3, #0–6	August 2003	1-4012-0122-9
Best of a Bad Lot	Gen^{13} vol. 4, #1–6	July 2007	1-4012-1323-5
Road Trip	Gen^{13} vol. 4, #7–13	February 2008	1-4012-1649-8
15 Minutes	Gen^{13} vol. 4, #14–20	November 2008	1-4012-2002-9
World's End	Gen^{13} vol. 4, #21–26	October 2009	1-4012-2488-1
Gen^{13} Backlist	Gen^{13} #½, 0 Gen^{13} vol. 2, #1 "Now Departing from Gate 37" short story from WildStorm! #1; Covers of Gen^{13} vol. 2, #1A-1N; Gen^{13}: The Unreal World	May 1997	1-887279-41-5
Gen^{13} Interactive Plus!	Gen^{13} Interactive #1–3; Gen^{13} 3-D Special	July 1998	1-58240-005-9
Gen^{13}: Ordinary Heroes	Gen^{13}: Ordinary Heroes #1–2; Gen^{13} Bootleg #1–2 "Wham" short story from The Wildstorm Thunderbook	October 2004	1-4012-0427-9

== In other media ==
=== Animation ===
Kevin Altieri directed a Gen^{13} animated feature for Buena Vista Pictures. It was shelved by the studio soon after Wildstorm was bought by DC Comics and never released in the U.S., but received a limited video release in Europe and Australia in 2000.

=== Novels ===
Three Gen^{13} paperback novels were released:

- Time and Chance, by Jeff Mariotte and Scott Ciencin, features a criminal mastermind who enjoys gambling. He captures the formula for creating superpowered beings and plans to use it to increase his power.
- Netherwar, written by Jeff Mariotte and Christopher Golden, begins with an old ally of Lynch meeting with the group. International Operations has apparently made contact with the realm of Hell itself underneath a casino it secretly owns. Gen^{13} must infiltrate the already-affected building and close down the portal before all of humanity is doomed.
- Version_2.0, written by Sholly Fisch, focuses on the diabolic plan of the team's old International Operations nemesis Ivana Baiul, who has fallen from the good graces of the government.

=== Video games ===
In February 1996, it was announced that Electronic Arts had signed a deal with WildStorm to develop a series of action-adventure games based on Gen^{13}. These games never came to fruition.
