= Dv8 =

American comic book series

Group publication information
- Publisher: Wildstorm (DC Comics)
- First appearance: Gen13 #6 (November 1995)
- Created by: J. Scott Campbell; Brandon Choi; Warren Ellis; Humberto Ramos

In-story information
- Type of organization: Team

DV8

Series publication information
- Schedule: Monthly
- Format: (vol. 1); Ongoing series (DV8 Vs. Black Ops) (Gods and Monsters); Limited series
- Genre: Superhero
- Publication date: (vol. 1); August 1996 – November 1999 (Gods and Monsters); June 2010 – January 2011
- Number of issues: (vol. 1); 32 (DV8 Vs. Black Ops); 3 (Gods and Monsters); 8
- Main character(s): Ivana Baiul (director); Threshold (field leader); Bliss; Frostbite (field leader); Copycat; Sublime; Evo; Powerhaus; Freestyle

Creative team
- Writer(s): (vol. 1); Warren Ellis (1-8); Shon Bury (7-8); Michael Heisler (9-32) (Gods and Monsters); Brian Wood
- Penciller(s): (vol. 1); Humberto Ramos (#1-2, 4-7); Michael Lopez (#3, 8); Juvaun Kirby (#8-13); Tom Raney (#14-16); Jason Johnson (#11, 17-18); Al Rio (#19-30); Trevor Scott (#31-32) (Gods and Monsters); Rebekah Isaacs
- Creator(s): J. Scott Campbell; Brandon Choi; Warren Ellis; Humberto Ramos

Collected editions
- Neighborhood Threat: ISBN 1-56389-927-2
- Gods And Monsters: ISBN 978-1401229733

DV8 is a comic book published by American label Wildstorm. The series revolves around the lives of a group of Gen-Active people (called DV8, or referred to as "The Deviants"), initially living in New York City under the supervision of Ivana Baiul, who sends them on life-threatening black ops assignments.

== Publication history ==
The series lasted 32 issues. The story including most DV8 members continued in the pages of Gen-Active, an anthology series featuring various Wildstorm characters. Gen-Active, lasted 6 issues.

Writer Micah Ian Wright pitched a relaunch to WildStorm in 2003, but it was not picked up by the publisher. The artist in the book would have been Mark Robinson.

The title returned in June 2010 as an eight-issue limited series called DV8: Gods and Monsters, written by Brian Wood with art by Rebekah Isaacs. The project is something Wood had been trying to get commissioned for years:

"I've pitched DV8 to WildStorm easily a half-dozen times over the last decade, and even this version now wasn't the easiest sell in the world. I like to think it speaks to the quality of my story that it convinced WildStorm to re-launch this book despite not having any previous plans to do so."-Brian Wood

== Creative teams ==
- Warren Ellis (Writer, #1-8)
- Mike Heisler (Writer, #9-32)
- Brian Wood (Writer, Gods and Monsters #1-8)
- Humberto Ramos (Art, #1-2, #4-7)
- Michael Lopez (Art, #3, Part of #8)
- Juvaun Kirby (Art, Part of #8, #9-13)
- Tom Raney (Art, #14-16)
- Jason Johnson (Art, Part of #11, #17-18)
- Al Rio (Art, #0, #19-30)
- Trevor Scott (Art, #31-32)
- Rebekah Isaacs (Art, Gods and Monsters #1-8)

== Characters ==
- Ivana Baiul - Leader of the antihero group. She is not fully human because cybernetic technology was integrated into certain parts of her body. Generally, she is immoral and very evil. She was the head of International Operations (I.O. until Operation: "Divine Right" occurred.
- Threshold (Matthew Callahan) - Field commander of the Deviants until he betrayed the team and went rogue. He has psionic powers and is very powerful and extremely psychotic. Until going rogue, he was Ivana's romance, then occasionally to Bliss, and later to a sex toy. He is also a half-brother of Sarah Rainmaker.
- Sublime (Rachel Goldman) - Has the ability to alter the density of her body from intangible to rock-hard.
- Bliss (Nicole Callahan) - Has the ability to stimulate human senses to the point of cardiac arrest and some psychic abilities. Generally, she is immoral and very capable of getting men to give her what she wants. She even was able to seduce her older brother, Threshold (Matthew Callahan).
- Frostbite (Leon Carver) - Has the ability to absorb heat from any source and leave it ice-cold. Generally, he is the least screwed-up member of the Deviants. After Threshold went rogue, Frostbite was appointed to the team leader, but he was banished by Ivana after losing his powers. Later he faked his death to get off Ivana's radar.
- Powerhaus (Hector Morales) - Has the ability to convert emotional energy into raw power, which increases his strength as well. He was killed in "DV8 Slipstream Annual".
- Copycat (Gem Antonelli) - Has the ability to take control of a person's mind and make them do whatever she wants. Due to an earlier incident, she has four split personalities in addition to her normal persona - Soldier, Nihilist, Spy, and Little Gemma. When ex-team-leader Threshold betrays the Deviants, he alters Gem's mind, leaving her body to be occupied by her other personalities.
- Evo (Michael Heller) - Has the ability to change into forms similar to a wolf, bat, or amphibian. Generally, he is very insensitive and otherwise dark in demeanor.
- Freestyle (Jocelyn Davis) - Has the ability to affect probability by psionically choosing the most favorable course of action based on a number of timelines. She is also very acrobatic and flexible.She was originally frozen in a cryogenic tube for the first few issues. Generally, she is upbeat and not unstable like the others.
- Sideways Bob - Guardian of the group. He has no powers and is psychotic and dangerous. He's missing an eye and lacks hair, and he carries around a disembodied mannequin head he calls Lucille. He told Sublime that she could be his "special awake friend". She didn't know if that was good or not.

== Collected editions ==
Some of the issues have been collected into a trade paperback:

- DV8: Neighborhood Threat (collects DV8 #1-6 and ½, 176 pages, Titan Books, October 2002, ISBN 1-84023-488-1, DC Comics, September 2002, ISBN 1-56389-927-2)
- DV8: Gods and Monsters (192 pages, Wildstorm, May 2011, ISBN 978-1401229733, Titan Books, June 2011, ISBN 978-0857682703)
