= Number of the Beast (comics) =

2008 limited series from Wildstorm

- Cover of the first issue

Publication information
- Publisher: Wildstorm
- Schedule: Bi-weekly
- Format: Limited series
- Genre: Superhero
- Publication date: June–September 2008
- No. of issues: 8

Creative team
- Written by: Scott Beatty
- Penciller(s): Chris Sprouse

Collected editions
- Number of the Beast: ISBN 1-4012-1999-3

Number of the Beast is a comic book limited series, written by Scott Beatty, with art by Chris Sprouse.

Number of the Beast was the second in a number of bi-weekly series, it was preceded by Wildstorm: Revelations, which resulted in the relaunch of a number of Wildstorm titles.

== Characters ==
As well as regular Wildstorm characters the series introduced a new team, The Paladins, comprising:

- Aeronaut, a jetpack-user and womanizer.
- Black Anvil, an Afro-American former football-player made of living iron. Considered indestructible.
- Engine Joe, real name Joseph Rotkowski, is a cyborg made from car parts. He is a friend of Mago and Tumbleweed.
- Thrush, an analogue to DC Comics' Hawkgirl.
- Falconette, daughter-sidekick of Thrush.
- Mago, a magician. Gained magical knowledge by 'renting his soul' to various occult powers.
- Midnight Rider, a female motorcycle-riding urban vigilante. She is a lesbian, and an analogue of the Midnighter.
- Neandra, a vigilante who acts like a cavewoman.
- Redeemer, evidently millennia old and eternally young, the leader of the Paladins.
- Tumbleweed, a former U.S. Army lieutenant, turned into a being made of desert flora by radiation testing from the Trinity Site.
- Honeybee, '50s icon for troops.
- Johnny Ray-Gun, a cowboy with a high-tech weapon.
- Mite, a size change superheroine.
- The High, the main antagonist from Warren Ellis' "Change or Die" arc of Stormwatch, was revived for the series.

== Synopsis ==
The story chronologically began in 1945, when General Zebulon McCandless, a very pious and dogmatic person, oversaw the American recovery of a crashed Daemonite flying saucer in Nevada's Black Rock Desert. The saucer was deliberately buried where it impacted and converted into a bunker facility. McCandless looked upon the saucer's teleportation, virtual reality, and suspended animation technology and an impossible idea occurred to him. He began drafting a plan to capture this era's superhuman heroes and villains, some of whom had contributed their services in World War II, and train them to fight off the End of Days under a program he titled "Number of the Beast". McCandless had America's hero team, the Paladins (who also knew the general very well), sent to observe the Hiroshima bombing, but they were teleported into the facility built around the saucer, known as Number of the Beast Bunker #1 (NOTB #1). Eventually, the Paladins' allies and enemies were similarly captured and placed in suspended animation, without ever-aging, for more than sixty years, during which the Paladins protected "the City" (the name of the simulation) from the portents of Christian eschatology.

In 2008, this all changed when the remains of The High, who remained alive since colliding with Skywatch due to his regenerating cells, was transported into the NOTB bunker and placed into the simulation. It was during this simulation that the Paladins and their enemies, the Crime Corps, endured the End of Days and encountered The High's former ally, the Eidolon, a former member of the High's Changers who was also placed into the simulation. The Eidolon had tried and failed to tell the simulation's prisoners of their unknown imprisonment. After entering the simulation, The High encountered his wounded archenemy Doctor Sin. After helping Doctor Sin and remembering his death during the events of "Change or Die" and his past encounter with Sin, The High 'killed' Doctor Sin and knew that there was something wrong when he tried to leave the city and realized his situation from The Eidolon's information. After being 'killed' by The Eidolon, The High woke up from the simulation with his body fully healed and formed.

The High forced his way out and confronted the bunker's wardens. However, Doctor Sin, who was also awake from suspension and fully armed, blasted The High into unconsciousness. At the same time in Washington, D.C., the Joint Chiefs headed by General William Somerset, the current overseer of the NOTB Program, were alerted to events in the NOTB bunker and sent a special strike team to deal with the situation. When the strike team arrived at the bunker, Doctor Sin had The High placed back into the simulation along with a single warden, Sergeant Stringer. Alerted to the strike team's arrival, Doctor Sin killed the team with the bunker's defense system, leaving only the team's leader, Lieutenant Welles, to survive and enter the bunker.

In the NOTB simulation, The High met and told two heroes, Johnny Ray-Gun and speedster Hotfoot, of their imprisonment with support from Sgt. Stringer, who then revealed to The High that the only way to be free from the simulation was for the prisoners to be 'killed' or 'die'. In the real world, Doctor Sin planned on escaping from the bunker; he faked his death by bringing one of the Paladins, Aeronaut, (who bore a strong facial resemblance to the villain) in his place to be killed by Lt. Welles. In the simulation, The High brought Hotfoot and Johnny Ray-Gun to the Paladins' headquarters where he subsequently 'killed' and freed the said team after they were tricked by the Eidolon (for his own amusement) into believing that The High was the "Antichrist" who was responsible for the events of Armageddon. After killing the Paladins and leaving only Hotfoot alive, The High was contacted by Welles, who stated to him that she would end the lives of everyone inside the simulation as per her orders from the American government. Before 'killing' Hotfoot, The High told him to find Welles as fast as he could once he was awake, while he tried to reason with her. Hotfoot immediately searched through the bunker and finally stopped Welles from initializing the 'kill button' by vibro-phasing his hand through her head, inducing brain damage. After this, The High then proceeded to destroy the simulation and everyone in it by speeding down into the city from the sky, causing a nuclear explosion.

Once awakening in the real world, many of the heroes and villains were confused about what had happened; at first, a few of the Paladins believed that it was still The High's fault, until he was awakened and clearly informed them, with coerced verification from an awakened Sgt. Stringer, of their sixty-year long-term imprisonment, much to everyone's shock. After the prisoners recovered their belongings and costumes, they regrouped with Engine Joe, who reported that he saw Doctor Sin escape from the bunker. The High questioned Stringer as to why the government had kept their belongings. Stringer stated that the military expected to use the heroes and villains as "military assets" if a major threat ever appeared. The prisoners then left the bunker. The High decided to find more answers and flew to the rebuilt StormWatch satellite base, Skywatch III, where he negotiated a truce between him and Jackson King.

The High and King explored The High's mind to learn what had happened to him after he was supposedly killed from crashing into Skywatch I and why he was placed in the NOTB program. It is revealed that The High's remains were gathered by the American government and his cells were used to clone super soldiers. The early clones of The High were "unsuccessful", and eventually the American military succeeded in mass-producing imperfect High clones and weaponized them as superpowered payloads known as the "Reaper Ballistic Missile Arsenal", shortened as "Reapers". After this, The High's remains were purposely contained in the NOTB facility as nuclear waste. At this moment, The High sensed that the Reapers were being launched by the Pentagon on the orders of General Somerset to kill the NOTB's prisoners.

The Authority were first to arrive at the NOTB bunker after having scanned the superhumans' presence. Due to a misunderstanding, they were forced into battle with the Paladins, who mistook The Authority as government assassins.

The High immediately sped away from Skywatch towards the airborne clones in an attempt to destroy the Reapers but realized from a telepathic communication with Jackson King that the only way to stop all of his clones was by finding the "shooter". As the fight between The Authority and the NOTB's prisoners continued, Authority members Jenny Quark and the Doctor learned of the Reapers and had everyone teleported back to the Authority's The Carrier residing in The Bleed just before. However, the Reapers managed to reach the Carrier by having one of the Reapers turn into a dimensional gateway. A battle ensued between the Reapers, The Authority, and the Paladins in which one of the Reapers breached the Carrier's engine core and released its power source (a miniature universe), potentially destroying the universe. This forced Jenny Quark to shunt the miniature universe into her body right before kissing the Doctor goodbye. The Doctor teleported the Reapers and Paladins away from the Carrier, preventing further damage to the vessel, but this allowed the Reapers to spread their destruction across the world. Despite the Doctor's best efforts, the Carrier "died" and crashed into London, England.

The High arrived at the Pentagon, where he confronted General Somerset and demanded that he stop the Reapers. Unfortunately, Somerset explained that the Reapers are totally compromised from their original programming and are out of control due to entering the Bleed, and now pose a threat to the world. The High was then approached by Slyxx, a Daemonite scientist who was the sole survivor of the saucer crash in 1945 given "amnesty" for working with the Americans in the NOTB program. Slyxx informed him that the Reapers were programmed to destroy all posthumans and that if they couldn't kill them all, then they would "take them all with [them]". Having heard enough of the Daemonite's information and swearing to Somerset that he and the others involved in the Number of the Beast program would pay for their crimes, The High left to fight his clones as they prepared to destroy the world. Somerset tried to rally his people but found them murdered by Slyxx, who then informed the general that he had just contacted his (Daemonite) high-command with the words, "mission accomplished."

In space, StormWatch witnessed the Reapers encircling the Earth and one of the clones being attacked by The High, a battle that resulted in the shattering of Earth's moon. Despite this, The High was too late to save the Earth as the Reapers exploded all around the globe, and causing Earth's axis to tilt, turning the planet into a post-apocalyptic wasteland (the World's End).

Following this great catastrophe, the superhero teams Stormwatch and the Wildcats prepared to save what was left of their devastated world. In Iowa, Paladins members Engine Joe, Mago, and Tumbleweed tracked down the retired Zebulon McCandless, informing him that he and those involved with the Number of the Beast would be held accountable for the world's devastation. Meanwhile, The High watched a burning New York City engulfed by the sea from atop of the Statue of Liberty. He was then met by the Eidolon. The High wondered if his actions with the Changers actually brought about the World's End from the beginning. The Eidolon suggested that despite the Earth's doomed condition, its heroes and villains would still continue to influence the world. The mini-series ended with The High, after hearing enough of The Eidolon, throwing him across the horizon.

== Collected editions ==
The series was brought together into a trade paperback:

- Number of the Beast (192 pages, September 2008, ISBN 1-4012-1999-3)
