= Warren Ellis bibliography =

Author bibliography

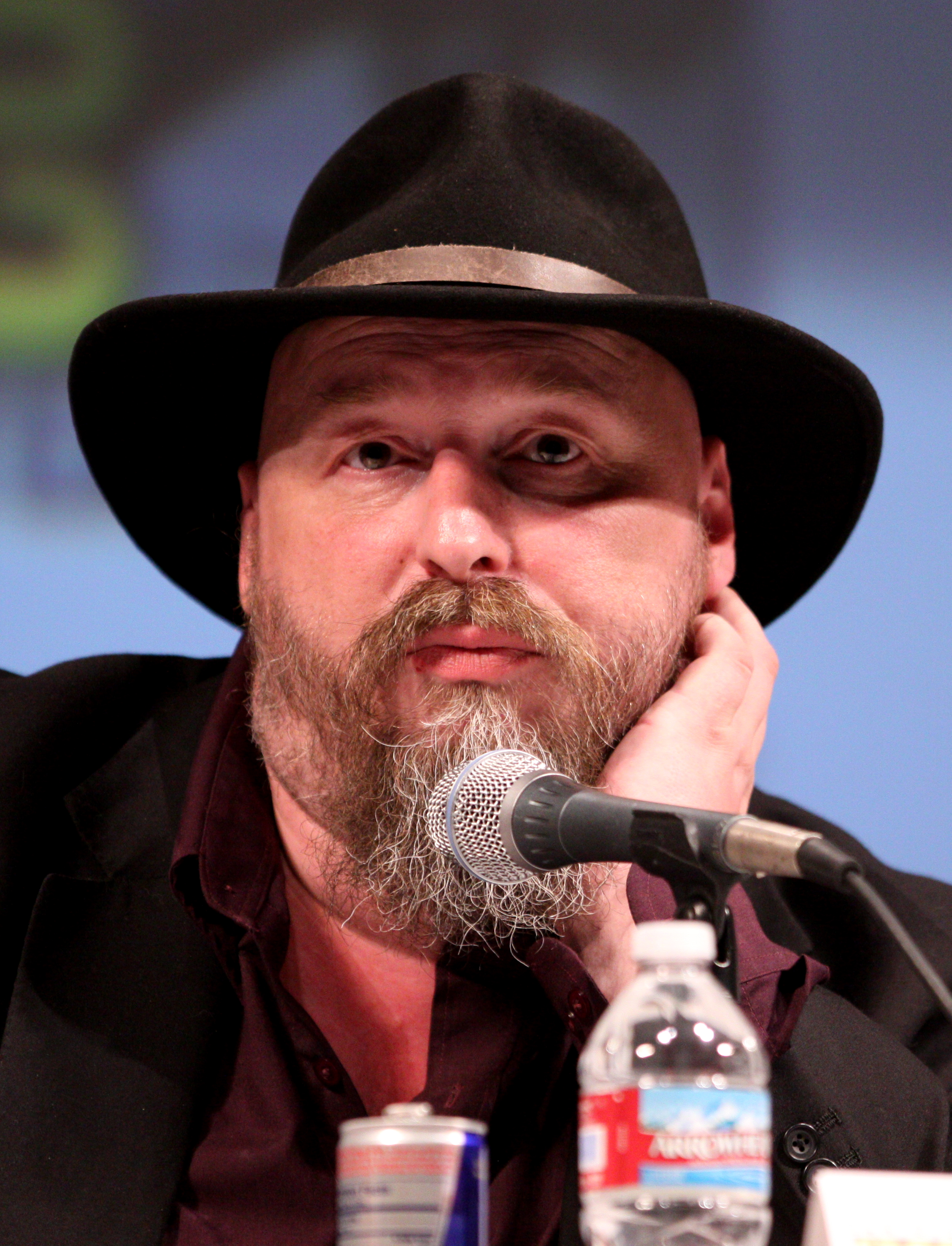
- Ellis in 2010
- Active period: 1984–present

Publishers
- Marvel Comics: 1995–2017
- Image Comics: 1996–present
- Wildstorm: 1996–2009
- DC Comics: 1996–2020
- Avatar Press: 1999–2010

Warren Ellis is a British comic book writer, novelist, and screenwriter, best known as the co-creator of several original comic book series such as Transmetropolitan, Global Frequency, and Red, the latter of which was adapted into the 2010 feature film Red and its 2013 sequel Red 2. A prolific comic book writer, he has written several Marvel series, including Astonishing X-Men, Thunderbolts, Moon Knight, and the "Extremis" story arc of Iron Man, which was the basis for the 2013 film Iron Man 3. Ellis' other credits include The Authority and Planetary, both of which he co-created for Wildstorm, as well as runs on Hellblazer for Vertigo and James Bond for Dynamite. In addition to his comics work, Ellis wrote two prose novels, Crooked Little Vein and Gun Machine, as well as numerous short stories and novellas.

== Comics ==
=== Early work ===
Titles published by various British publishers include:

- Doctor Death: The Life Man (with Martin Chaplin):
  - Doctor Death: The Life Man (series of self-published minicomics, 1984)
  - Food for Thought (untitled one-page strip in the anthology one-shot co-edited by Ellis with Gary Millidge, Matt Ginn and Dave Whitwell, Flying Pig, 1985)
- Electric Angel (with Ben Dilworth, ashcan comic self-published in anticipation of the eponymous series intended for publication by Trident, 1989)
- Deadline #24: "United We Fall" (with Nigel Dobbyn, anthology, Deadline Publications, 1990)
- John Brown Publishing:
  - Speakeasy #117: "My Friendly Blurred Days" (with Edmund Perryman, anthology, 1991)
  - Blast! #1–7: "Lazarus Churchyard" (with D'Israeli, anthology, 1991)
    - In 1992, Tundra UK reprinted these seven installments as the first issue of the Lazarus Churchyard series.
    - The series continued for two more issues and was collected by Atomeka as Lazarus Churchyard (tpb, 120 pages, 1993, ISBN 1-85809-005-9)
      - Issue #2 featured a segment with art by Phil Winslade, Steve Pugh, Woodrow Phoenix, Duncan Fegredo, Garry Marshall and Gary Erskine.
      - Issue #3 featured "To Here Knows When", a prose story with illustrations by Garry Marshall.
    - In 2001, Image collected Lazarus Churchyard #1–3 with a new epilogue as Lazarus Churchyard: The Final Cut (tpb, 128 pages, ISBN 1-58240-180-2)
    - Two short installments of Harlequin Bones, a spin-off series written by Ellis and drawn by Phil Winslade, have appeared in titles published by Atomeka:
      - A1 #6: "Dada 331" (anthology, 1992)
      - Ammo Armageddon: "Kil 4/11/44" (anthology one-shot, 1993)
- Judge Dredd Megazine #7: "Judge Edwina's Strange Cases: Feed Me" (with Sean Phillips, anthology, Fleetway, 1991)
- Doctor Who Magazine #174: "Under Reykjavik" (one-page prose story with an illustration by Paul Vyse, Marvel UK, 1991)
- Damage (with David Gordon, series of self-published minicomics, 1993–1994)
- Sugarvirus (with Martin Chaplin, one-shot, Atomeka, 1993)

=== Marvel Comics ===
Titles published by Marvel and its various imprints include:

- Hellstorm by Warren Ellis Omnibus (hc, 424 pages, 2018, ISBN 1-302-91324-7) collects:
  - Hellstorm: Prince of Lies #12–21 (with Leonardo Manco, Peter Gross (#14), Derek Yaniger (#17) and Martin Chaplin (#21), 1994)
  - Druid #1–4 (with Leonardo Manco, 1995)
- Marvel 2099:
  - 2099 Unlimited (anthology):
    - "Metalscream" (with D'Israeli, in #4 and 7, 1994)
    - "Steel Rain" (with Gary Erskine, in #9, 1995)
  - Doom 2099 #24–39 (with Pat Broderick, David G. Klein (#31), John Royle (#32), Steve Pugh, Ashley Wood (#37) and John Buscema (#39), 1994–1996) collected as Doom 2099 by Warren Ellis: The Complete Collection (tpb, 424 pages, 2013, ISBN 0-7851-6754-4)
    - 2099 Special: World of Doom, featuring a prose piece by Ellis and articles about then-upcoming "One Nation Under Doom" storyline, was published in 1995 and reprinted along with the series in Doom 2099 by Warren Ellis: The Complete Collection.
    - Issues #24–25 are scripted by Ellis from plots by John Francis Moore.
  - 2099 A.D. Apocalypse: "Midnight in Hell!" (with Mark Buckingham, one-shot, 1995)
  - 2099 A.D. Genesis: "Mid Day Sun" (with Dale Eaglesham, one-shot, 1996)
- X-Men:
  - Excalibur (with Terry Dodson (#83), Daerick Gross (#84, 88), Ken Lashley, Larry Stroman (#88, 90), David A. Williams (#89–91), Carlos Pacheco, Casey Jones and Randy Green (#100), 1994–1996) collected as:
    - Excalibur Visionaries: Warren Ellis Volume 1 (collects #83–90, tpb, 216 pages, 2010, ISBN 0-7851-4456-0)
    - Excalibur Visionaries: Warren Ellis Volume 2 (collects #91–95, tpb, 232 pages, 2010, ISBN 0-7851-4929-5)
      - Includes the 4-issue limited series Starjammers (written by Ellis, art by Carlos Pacheco, 1995–1996)
    - Excalibur Visionaries: Warren Ellis Volume 3 (collects #96–103, tpb, 272 pages, 2010, ISBN 0-7851-4952-X)
      - Includes the 3-issue limited series Pryde and Wisdom (written by Ellis, art by Terry Dodson and Aaron Lopresti (#2–3), 1996)
  - X-Calibre #1–4 (with Ken Lashley, 1995)
    - Collected in X-Men: The Complete Age of Apocalypse Volume 2 (tpb, 376 pages, 2006, ISBN 0-7851-1874-8)
    - Collected in X-Men: The Age of Apocalypse Omnibus (hc, 1,072 pages, 2012, ISBN 0-7851-5982-7)
  - What If...? vol. 2 #77: "What If Legion Had Killed Magneto?" (with Héctor C. Gómez, anthology, 1995)
    - Scripted by Ellis from a story by Benny R. Powell.
    - Collected in X-Men: The Age of Apocalypse Omnibus Companion (hc, 992 pages, 2014, ISBN 0-7851-8514-3)
    - Collected in X-Men: The Age of Apocalyse — Twilight (tpb, 432 pages, 2016, ISBN 0-7851-9344-8)
  - Storm #1–4 (with Terry Dodson, 1996) collected in X-Men: Storm by Warren Ellis and Terry Dodson (tpb, 112 pages, 2013, ISBN 0-7851-8501-1)
  - Wolverine vol. 2 #119–122 (with Leinil Francis Yu, 1997–1998) collected as Wolverine: Not Dead Yet (tpb, 96 pages, 1998, ISBN 0-7851-0704-5; hc, 112 pages, 2009, ISBN 0-7851-3766-1)
  - X-Men/WildC.A.T.s: The Dark Age (with Mat Broome and Brett Booth, one-shot, 1998) collected in WildC.A.T.s/X-Men (tpb, 194 pages, Wildstorm, 1998, ISBN 1-58240-022-9)
  - X-Force #102–105 (co-written by Ellis and Ian Edginton, art by Whilce Portacio) and 106–109 (scripted by Edginton from Ellis' plots, 2000) collected as Counter-X Volume 1 (tpb, 192 pages, 2008, ISBN 0-7851-3304-6)
  - Generation X #63 (co-written by Ellis and Brian Wood, art by Steve Pugh) and 64–70 (scripted by Wood from Ellis' plots, 2000) collected as Counter-X Volume 2 (tpb, 192 pages, 2008, ISBN 0-7851-3305-4)
  - X-Man #63–66 (co-written by Ellis and Steven Grant, art by Ariel Olivetti) and 67–70 (scripted by Grant from Ellis' plots, 2000) collected as Counter-X Volume 3 (tpb, 192 pages, 2008, ISBN 0-7851-3306-2)
  - Astonishing X-Men:
    - Astonishing X-Men vol. 3 (with Simone Bianchi and Phil Jimenez, 2008–2010) collected as:
      - Ghost Box (collects #25–30, hc, 184 pages, 2009, ISBN 0-7851-3390-9; tpb, 2009, ISBN 0-7851-2788-7)
        - Includes the 2-issue spin-off limited series Astonishing X-Men: Ghost Boxes (written by Ellis, art by Alan Davis, Adi Granov, Clayton Crain and Kaare Andrews, 2008–2009)
      - Exogenetic (collects #31–35, hc, 136 pages, 2010, ISBN 0-7851-3149-3; tpb, 2011, ISBN 0-7851-3169-8)
    - Astonishing X-Men: Xenogenesis #1–5 (with Kaare Andrews, 2010) collected as Astonishing X-Men: Xenogenesis (hc, 160 pages, 2010, ISBN 0-7851-4491-9; tpb, 2011, ISBN 0-7851-4033-6)
- Ghost Rider:
  - Ghost Rider vol. 2:
    - "Skin Games" (with Salvador Larroca, in #55, 1994)
    - "Wish for Pain" (with Javier Saltares, in Annual #2, 1994)
  - Ghost Rider/Ballistic: "Devil's Reign, Part Three" (with Billy Tan, one-shot, 1997) collected in Marvel/Top Cow Crossover Collection (tpb, 304 pages, 2005, ISBN 1-58240-533-6)
- Doctor Strange: Sorcerer Supreme #80: "Earthquake Logic" (with Mark Buckingham, 1995) collected in Doctor Strange: Afterlife (tpb, 496 pages, 2017, ISBN 1-302-90789-1)
  - Despite planning a longer run on the series, Ellis scripted only one full issue before departing due to "creative differences" with then-executive editor Bobbie Chase.
  - Issue #81 was scripted by Todd Dezago and #82 by Evan Skolnick from Ellis' plots.
- Daredevil #343: "Recross" (with Arvell Jones and Keith Pollard, 1995) collected in Daredevil: Root of Evil (tpb, 440 pages, 2018, ISBN 1-302-91258-5)
- Ruins #1–2 (with Cliff Nielsen, Terese Nielsen and Christopher Moeller (#2), 1995) collected in Marvels Companion (tpb, 512 pages, 2014, ISBN 0-7851-9059-7)
- Ultraforce (Malibu):
  - Ultraforce/Avengers: "Becoming More Like God" (with George Pérez, one-shot, 1995)
  - Ultraforce vol. 2:
    - "Burnt Offerings" (plot by Ellis; written by Ian Edginton, art by John Royle, in #∞, 1995)
    - "Wave of Mutilation" (with Steven Butler, in #1–3, 1995)
    - "Smoke and Bone" (plot by Ellis; written by Ian Edginton, art by Darick Robertson, in #5–7, 1996)
- Thor #491–494 (with Mike Deodato, Jr., 1995–1996) collected as Thor: Worldengine (tpb, 96 pages, 1996, ISBN 0-7851-0217-5; hc, 112 pages, 2011, ISBN 0-7851-4982-1)
- Epic:
  - Akira #38: "Candy Flower Napalm" (with Terry Shoemaker, co-feature, 1996)
  - Silencers #1–3 (with Gary Erskine — unreleased due to Epic's dissolution; published in 2000 via Image as City of Silence)
- Carnage: Mind Bomb (with Kyle Hotz, one-shot, 1996) collected in Carnage Classic (tpb, 488 pages, 2016, ISBN 1-302-90059-5)
- Satana (with Ariel Olivetti, unproduced series intended for publication under Marvel's short-lived "mature readers" horror line, c. 1996–1997)
  - Ellis later repurposed the story ideas for the first arc into the creator-owned series Strange Kiss published by Avatar in 3 issues between 1999 and 2000.
  - In 2018, Marvel published the penciled, inked and lettered version of Satana #1 as well as parts of issue #2 in Hellstorm by Warren Ellis Omnibus (see above).
- End Times (unproduced 12-issue maxi-series, commissioned in 1997 and canceled in 1998; Ellis reused the completed scripts for Marvel's Ultimate Extinction)
- Iron Man vol. 4 #1–6: "Extremis" (with Adi Granov, 2005–2006) collected as Iron Man: Extremis (hc, 160 pages, 2006, ISBN 0-7851-1612-5; tpb, 2007, ISBN 0-7851-2258-3)
- Nextwave: Agents of H.A.T.E. (with Stuart Immonen, 2006–2007) collected as:
  - This is What They Want (collects #1–6, hc, 144 pages, 2006, ISBN 0-7851-2278-8; tpb, 2007, ISBN 0-7851-1909-4)
  - I Kick Your Face (collects #7–12, hc, 144 pages, 2007, ISBN 0-7851-2855-7; tpb, 2008, ISBN 0-7851-1910-8)
  - Ultimate Collection: Nextwave, Agents of H.A.T.E. (collects #1–12, tpb, 304 pages, 2010, ISBN 0-7851-4461-7)
- newuniversal:
  - newuniversal #1–6 (with Salvador Larroca, 2007) collected as newuniversal: Everything Went White (hc, 152 pages, 2007, ISBN 0-7851-2858-1; tpb, 2008, ISBN 0-7851-2302-4)
  - A sequel limited series titled newuniversal: Shockfront (art by Steve Kurth) began publishing in 2008 but was soon put on hiatus due to Ellis' alleged 2007 hard drive crash.
  - Only two issues (out of six planned) ended up being released, and the project was eventually canceled. During the series' run, Marvel published two spin-off one-shots:
    - newuniversal: 1959 (written by Kieron Gillen, drawn by Greg Scott, 2008)
    - newuniversal: Conqueror (written by Simon Spurrier, drawn by Eric Nguyen, 2008)
- Thunderbolts (with Mike Deodato, Jr., 2007–2008) collected as:
  - Faith in Monsters (collects #110–115, hc, 192 pages, 2007, ISBN 0-7851-2568-X; tpb, 2008, ISBN 0-7851-2566-3)
    - Includes the Thunderbolts segment from the Civil War: The Initiative one-shot (written by Ellis, art by Marc Silvestri, 2007)
  - Caged Angels (collects #116–121, hc, 144 pages, 2008, ISBN 0-7851-2635-X; tpb, 2008, ISBN 0-7851-2567-1)
  - Ultimate Collection: Thunderbolts by Warren Ellis and Mike Deodato (collects #110–121 and the prologue from Civil War: The Initiative, tpb, 296 pages, 2011, ISBN 0-7851-5849-9)
- Osborn #1: "The Prime of Miss June Covington" (with Jamie McKelvie, co-feature, 2011) collected in Osborn: Evil Incarcerated (tpb, 120 pages, 2011, ISBN 0-7851-5175-3)
- Secret Avengers #16–21 (with Jamie McKelvie (#16), Kev Walker (#17), David Aja (#18), Michael Lark (#19), Alex Maleev (#20) and Stuart Immonen (#21), 2011–2012)
  - Collected as Secret Avengers: Run the Mission, Don't Get Caught, Save the World (hc, 144 pages, 2012, ISBN 0-7851-5255-5; tpb, 2012, ISBN 0-7851-5256-3)
- The Avengers: Endless Wartime (with Mike McKone, graphic novel, hc, 120 pages, 2013, ISBN 0-7851-8467-8; sc, 2017, ISBN 0-7851-8468-6)
- Avengers Assemble #22–25 (co-written by Ellis and Kelly Sue DeConnick, art by Matteo Buffagni, Paco Diaz (#22) and Neil Edwards (#25), 2014)
  - Collected in Avengers Assemble: The Forgeries of Jealousy (tpb, 112 pages, 2014, ISBN 0-7851-5408-6)
  - Collected in Inhumanity (hc, 448 pages, 2014, ISBN 0-7851-9033-3; tpb, 2015, ISBN 0-7851-9034-1)
- Moon Knight vol. 4 #1–6 (with Declan Shalvey, 2014) collected as Moon Knight: From the Dead (tpb, 136 pages, 2014, ISBN 0-7851-5408-6)
- Captain Marvel vol. 8 #12–13 (co-written by Ellis and Kelly Sue DeConnick, art by David López, 2015) collected in Captain Marvel: Alis, Volat, Propriis (tpb, 96 pages, 2015, ISBN 0-7851-9841-5)
- Karnak #1–6 (with Gerardo Zaffino (#1–2), Antonio Fuso (#2) and Roland Boschi, 2015–2017) collected as Karnak: The Flaw in All Things (tpb, 136 pages, 2017, ISBN 0-7851-9848-2)

==== Ultimate Comics ====
Titles published under the Ultimate Marvel label include:

- Ultimate Fantastic Four (with Stuart Immonen and Adam Kubert, 2004–2005) collected as:
  - Volume 1 (includes #7–12, hc, 320 pages, 2005, ISBN 0-7851-1458-0)
  - Volume 2 (includes #13–18, hc, 240 pages, 2006, ISBN 0-7851-2058-0)
  - Omnibus Volume 1 (includes #7–18, hc, 856 pages, 2025, ISBN 1-3029-6366-X)
  - Epic Collection: The Fantastic (includes #7–18, tpb, 464 pages, 2025, ISBN 1-3029-6385-6)
- Ultimate Galactus Trilogy (hc, 368 pages, 2007, ISBN 0-7851-2139-0; tpb, 2009, ISBN 0-7851-3722-X) collects:
  - Ultimate Nightmare #1–5 (with Trevor Hairsine and Steve Epting (#3), 2004–2005) also collected as Ultimate Nightmare (tpb, 120 pages, 2005, ISBN 0-7851-1497-1)
  - Ultimate Secret #1–4 (with Steve McNiven and Tom Raney (#3–4), 2005) also collected as Ultimate Secret (tpb, 96 pages, 2006, ISBN 0-7851-1660-5)
  - Ultimate Extinction #1–5 (with Brandon Peterson, 2006) also collected as Ultimate Extinction (tpb, 120 pages, 2006, ISBN 0-7851-1496-3)
- Ultimate Human #1–4 (with Cary Nord, 2008) collected as Ultimate Human (hc, 104 pages, 2008, ISBN 0-7851-2015-7; tpb, 2008, ISBN 0-7851-2917-0)
- Ultimate Comics: Armor Wars #1–4 (with Steve Kurth, 2009–2010) collected as Ultimate Comics: Armor Wars (hc, 112 pages, 2010, ISBN 0-7851-4250-9; tpb, 2010, ISBN 0-7851-4430-7)

=== Image Comics ===
Titles published by Image include:

- Wildstorm (moved under DC Comics in January 1999):
  - Sword of Damocles #1–2 (with Randy Green, 1996)
  - Stormwatch (with Tom Raney, Pete Woods (#39), Michael Ryan, Jim Lee (#47), Óscar Jiménez and Bryan Hitch, 1996–1998) collected as:
    - Force of Nature (collects vol. 1 #37–42, tpb, 160 pages, 2000, ISBN 1-56389-646-X)
    - Lighting Strikes (collects vol. 1 #43–47, tpb, 144 pages, 2000, ISBN 1-56389-650-8)
    - Change or Die (collects vol. 1 #48–50, Stormwatch Preview and vol. 2 #1–3, tpb, 176 pages, 1999, ISBN 1-56389-534-X)
    - A Finer World (collects vol. 2 #4–9, tpb, 144 pages, 1999, ISBN 1-56389-535-8)
    - Final Orbit (collects vol. 2 #10–11, tpb, 96 pages, 2001, ISBN 1-56389-788-1)
      - Includes the WildC.A.T.s/Aliens one-shot (written by Ellis, art by Chris Sprouse, 1998)
    - Volume 1 (collects vol. 1 #37–47, hc, 296 pages, DC Comics, 2012, ISBN 1-4012-3420-8; tpb, 2013, ISBN 1-4012-3421-6)
    - Volume 2 (collects vol. 1 #48–50, Stormwatch Preview and vol. 2 #1–11, hc, 384 pages, DC Comics, 2013, ISBN 1-4012-3725-8; tpb, 2014, ISBN 1-4012-3727-4)
    - The Road to the Authority Compendium (collects vol. 1 #37–50, Stormwatch Preview and vol. 2 #1–11, tpb, 680 pages, DC Comics, 2025, ISBN 1-77952-806-X)
  - DV8 #1–6, ½, 7–8 (with Humberto Ramos, Michael Lopez (#3), Juvaun Kirby (#½) and Kevin West (#6); Shon C. Bury scripted #7–8 from Ellis' plots, 1996–1997)
    - DV8: Rave, a one-shot featuring interviews with Ellis and other creators as well as preliminary art and sketches, was released prior to the series' launch.
    - Issues #1–6 and ½ are collected as DV8: Neighborhood Threat (tpb, 176 pages, 2002, ISBN 1-56389-927-2)
  - Gen^{13} Annual #1 and Gen^{13} Bootleg Annual #1: "New York, London, Hell" (with Steve Dillon, 1997–1998)
- Celestine #1–2 (with Pat Lee, Extreme Studios, 1996)
- Top Cow:
  - Tales of the Witchblade #3–4: "Selena" (with Billy Tan, 1997–1998) collected in Witchblade: Distinctions (tpb, 160 pages, 2001, ISBN 1-58240-199-3)
  - Down #1–4 (with Tony Harris (#1) and Cully Hamner, 2005–2006) collected as The Best of Warren Ellis: Down (tpb, 176 pages, 2006, ISBN 1-58240-623-5)
- Rumble Girls: Silky Warrior Tansie #1–6 (as "consulting editor"; written and drawn by Lea Hernandez, 2000–2001)
  - Issues #5–6 featured short stories starring a character named Poppy (written by Ellis, art by Lea Hernandez)
  - One more story was planned for #7 before the series was canceled; another Poppy story was released online.
- City of Silence #1–3 (with Gary Erskine, 2000) collected as City of Silence (tpb, 104 pages, 2004, ISBN 1-58240-367-8)
- Powers #7 (written by Brian Michael Bendis, drawn by Michael Avon Oeming, 2000)
  - This issue features Warren Ellis as a character, and most of his dialogue consists of quotes from various From the Desk of essays.
- Morning Dragons (with Steve Lieber, unproduced graphic novel — initially announced for 2001, but later withdrawn from Image altogether)
- Black Horses (with John Paul Leon, unproduced 3-issue limited series — initially announced for 2001, later reportedly taken to DC's Wildstorm imprint)
- Ministry of Space #1–3 (with Chris Weston, 2001–2004) collected as Ministry of Space (hc, 96 pages, 2005, ISBN 1-58240-424-0; tpb, 2006, ISBN 1-58240-423-2)
- Fell #1–9 (with Ben Templesmith, 2005–2008)
  - Issue #10 was solicited for an October 2007 release but according to Ellis, Templesmith was unable to start drawing the script due to family issues.
  - In 2021, Templesmith announced a conclusion in the form of a "single-volume work" which caused a backlash due to Ellis' prior allegations of misconduct.
  - Issues #1–8 are collected as Fell: Feral City (hc, 128 pages, 2007, ISBN 1-58240-808-4; tpb, 2007, ISBN 1-58240-693-6)
- Thought Bubble Anthology #2: "Soon" (with Tula Lotay, 2012) collected in Thought Bubble Anthology Collection (tpb, 136 pages, 2016, ISBN 1-5343-0067-8)
- Trees (with Jason Howard):
  - Trees (2014–2016) collected as:
    - In Shadow (collects #1–8, tpb, 160 pages, 2015, ISBN 1-63215-270-3)
    - Two Forests (collects #9–14, tpb, 128 pages, 2016, ISBN 1-63215-522-2)
  - Trees: Three Fates #1–5 (2019–2020) collected as Trees: Three Fates (tpb, 128 pages, 2020, ISBN 1-5343-1509-8)
- Supreme: Blue Rose #1–7 (with Tula Lotay, 2014–2015) collected as Supreme: Blue Rose (tpb, 168 pages, 2015, ISBN 1-63215-312-2)
- Injection #1–15 (with Declan Shalvey, 2015–2017) collected as Injection (hc, 400 pages, 2018, ISBN 1-5343-0862-8)
- Heartless (with Tula Lotay, announced for January 2016)
- Cemetery Beach #1–7 (with Jason Howard, 2018–2019) collected as Cemetery Beach (tpb, 176 pages, 2019, ISBN 1-5343-1223-4)
- Ghost Drive Station (with Lordess Foudre, one-shot, 2026)

=== DC Comics ===
Titles published by DC Comics and its various imprints include:

- Batman:
  - Batman: Legends of the Dark Knight #83–84: "Infected" (with John McCrea, anthology, 1996) collected in Batman: Monsters (tpb, 192 pages, 2009, ISBN 1-4012-2494-6)
  - Batman: Gotham Knights #1: "To Become the Bat" (with Jim Lee, co-feature, 2000) collected in Batman: Black and White Volume 2 (hc, 176 pages, 2002, ISBN 1-56389-828-4; tpb, 2003, ISBN 1-56389-917-5)
  - Detective Comics #1000: "The Batman's Design" (with Becky Cloonan, co-feature, 2019) collected in Batman: 80 Years of the Bat Family (tpb, 400 pages, 2020, ISBN 1-77950-658-9)
  - The Batman's Grave #1–12 (with Bryan Hitch, 2019–2020) collected as The Batman's Grave (hc, 296 pages, 2021, ISBN 1-77950-657-0; tpb, 2022, ISBN 1-77951-431-X)
  - Dark Nights: Death Metal — Legends of the Dark Knights (with Jim Cheung, a 2-page story for the anthology one-shot; removed before release)
- Transmetropolitan #1–12 (with Darick Robertson, Helix, 1997–1998)
  - After the dissolution of the Helix imprint, the series was moved to Vertigo for the remainder of its run.
  - Issues #1–3 were collected under the Helix brand as Transmetropolitan: Back on the Street (tpb, 72 pages, 1998, ISBN 1-56389-445-9)
- JLA: Classified #10–15 (with Butch Guice, 2005–2006) collected as JLA: Classified — New Maps of Hell (tpb, 136 pages, 2006, ISBN 1-4012-0944-0)
- Jack Cross #1–4 (with Gary Erskine, 2005–2006)
- The Wild Storm (short-lived revival/reimagining of the Wildstorm Universe as a "pop-up" imprint curated by Ellis):
  - The Wild Storm (with Jon Davis-Hunt, 2017–2019) collected as:
    - Volume 1 (collects #1–6, tpb, 176 pages, 2017, ISBN 1-4012-7418-8)
    - Volume 2 (collects #7–12, tpb, 160 pages, 2018, ISBN 1-4012-7865-5)
    - Volume 3 (collects #13–18, tpb, 160 pages, 2019, ISBN 1-4012-8527-9)
    - Volume 4 (collects #19–24, tpb, 160 pages, 2019, ISBN 1-4012-9271-2)
  - The Wild Storm: Zealot was listed among the planned spin-offs in the initial press release but never officially announced.
  - The Wild Storm: Michael Cray #1–12 (story by Ellis; written by Bryan Edward Hill, drawn by N. Steven Harris, 2018–2019)
  - Wildcats vol. 6 (with Ramon Villalobos, 6-issue limited series announced for August 2019)
    - Three issues were solicited before the title was pulled from schedule.
    - In 2020, Ellis confirmed the project has been canceled.

==== Vertigo ====
Titles published by DC Comics' Vertigo imprint include:

- Transmetropolitan (with Darick Robertson, 1998–2001) collected as:
  - Absolute Edition Volume 1 (collects #1–18, hc, 544 pages, 2015, ISBN 1-4012-5430-6)
    - Includes the "Edgy Winter" short story (art by Darick Robertson) from Vertigo: Winter's Edge #2 (anthology, 1999)
    - Includes the Transmetropolitan: I Hate It Here one-shot (written by Ellis, illustrated by various artists, 2000)
  - Absolute Edition Volume 2 (collects #19–39, hc, 544 pages, 2016, ISBN 1-4012-6115-9)
    - Includes the "Next Winters" short story (art by Darick Robertson) from Vertigo: Winter's Edge #3 (anthology, 2000)
    - Includes the Transmetropolitan: Filth of the City one-shot (written by Ellis, illustrated by various artists, 2001)
  - Absolute Edition Volume 3 (collects #40–60, hc, 544 pages, 2018, ISBN 1-4012-8545-7)
  - Book One (collects #1–12, tpb, 320 pages, 2019, ISBN 1-4012-8795-6)
  - Book Two (collects #13–24 and the Transmetropolitan: I Hate It Here one-shot, tpb, 336 pages, 2019, ISBN 1-4012-9430-8)
  - Book Three (collects #25–36 and the short stories from Vertigo: Winter's Edge #2–3, tpb, 288 pages, 2020, ISBN 1-77950-010-6)
  - Book Four (collects #37–48 and the Transmetropolitan: Filth of the City one-shot, tpb, 336 pages, 2020, ISBN 1-77950-469-1)
  - Book Five (collects #49–60, tpb, 296 pages, 2021, ISBN 1-77950-816-6)
- Hellblazer #134–143 (with John Higgins, Frank Teran (#140), Tim Bradstreet (#141), Javier Pulido (#142) and Marcelo Frusin (#143), 1999)
  - Despite planning a longer run on the series, Ellis left the title soon after the cancellation of "Shoot" (the story originally intended for publication as issue #141).
  - The story, fully drawn (by Phil Jimenez) and lettered at the time of cancellation, was eventually printed in Vertigo Resurrected: Shoot (one-shot, 2010).
  - The entire 10-issue run, along with "Shoot", is collected in John Constantine, Hellblazer Volume 13 (tpb, 327 pages, 2016, ISBN 1-4012-6141-8)
- Orbiter (with Colleen Doran, graphic novel, hc, 104 pages, 2003, ISBN 1-4012-0056-7; sc, 2004, ISBN 1-4012-0268-3)
- Stealth Tribes (with Colleen Doran, unproduced graphic novel — initially announced for 2005)

==== Wildstorm ====
Titles published by Wildstorm as a DC Comics imprint include:

- Planetary (with John Cassaday, 1999–2009) collected as:
  - All Over the World and Other Stories (collects #1–6, tpb, 160 pages, 2000, ISBN 1-56389-648-6; hc, 2001, ISBN 1-56389-777-6)
    - Includes the 8-page preview story "Nuclear Spring" (art by John Cassaday) published in Gen^{13} vol. 2 #33 and C-23 #6 (1998)
  - The Fourth Man (collects #7–12, tpb, 144 pages, 2001, ISBN 1-56389-764-4; hc, 2001, ISBN 1-56389-776-8)
  - Crossing Worlds (tpb, 192 pages, 2004, ISBN 1-4012-0279-9) collects:
    - Planetary/The Authority: Ruling the World (with Phil Jimenez, one-shot, 2000)
    - Planetary/JLA: Terra Occulta (with Jerry Ordway, one-shot, 2002)
    - Planetary/Batman: Night on Earth (with John Cassaday, one-shot, 2003)
  - Leaving the 20th Century (collects #13–18, hc, 192 pages, 2004, ISBN 1-4012-0293-4; tpb, 2005, ISBN 1-4012-0294-2)
  - Spacetime Archaeology (collects #19–27, hc, 224 pages, 2010, ISBN 1-4012-0996-3; tpb, 2010, ISBN 1-4012-2345-1)
  - Absolute Edition Volume 1 (collects #1–12 and the preview, hc, 320 pages, 2010, ISBN 1-4012-0327-2)
  - Absolute Edition Volume 2 (collects #13–27, hc, 384 pages, 2010, ISBN 1-4012-2701-5)
  - Omnibus (collects #1–27 and the one-shots, hc, 864 pages, 2014, ISBN 1-4012-4238-3)
  - Compendium (collects #1–27 and the one-shots, tpb, 824 pages, 2026, ISBN 1-7995-0860-9)
- The Authority Omnibus (hc, 984 pages, 2019, ISBN 1-4012-9231-3) includes:
  - The Authority #1–12 (with Bryan Hitch, 1999–2000) also collected as The Authority Volume 1 (hc, 296 pages, 2013, ISBN 1-4012-4030-5; tpb, 2014, ISBN 1-4012-4707-5)
  - Wildstorm Summer Special: "Orbital" (with Cully Hamner, anthology one-shot, 2001) also collected in The Authority: Absolute Edition Volume 2 (hc, 504 pages, 2018, ISBN 1-4012-8115-X)
  - Wildstorm: A Celebration of 25 Years: "Requiem" (with Bryan Hitch, new story for the retrospective anthology book, 300 pages, 2017, ISBN 1-4012-7652-0) also collected in The Authority: Absolute Edition Volume 1 (hc, 384 pages, 2017, ISBN 1-4012-7647-4)
- Global Frequency (with Garry Leach (#1), Glenn Fabry (#2), Steve Dillon (#3), Roy Martinez (#4), Jon J. Muth (#5), David Lloyd (#6), Simon Bisley (#7), Chris Sprouse (#8), Lee Bermejo (#9), Tomm Coker (#10), Jason Pearson (#11) and Gene Ha (#12), 2002–2004) collected as:
  - Planet Ablaze (collects #1–6, tpb, 144 pages, 2004, ISBN 1-4012-0274-8)
  - Detonation Radio (collects #7–12, tpb, 144 pages, 2004, ISBN 1-4012-0291-8)
  - The Deluxe Edition (collects #1–12, hc, 320 pages, 2018, ISBN 1-4012-7820-5)
- Homage:
  - Reload/Mek (tpb, 144 pages, 2004, ISBN 1-4012-0275-6) collects:
    - Mek #1–3 (with Steve Rolston, 2003)
    - Reload #1–3 (with Paul Gulacy, 2003)
  - Red:
    - Red #1–3 (with Cully Hamner, 2003–2004) collected in Red/Tokyo Storm Warning (tpb, 144 pages, 2004, ISBN 1-4012-0283-7)
    - To coincide with the release of the film adaptation, Wildstorm published several film tie-ins and a prequel to the original series:
      - Red: Joe Special (written by Doug Wagner, drawn by Bruno Redondo, one-shot, 2010)
      - Red: Victoria Special (written by Jon Hoeber, drawn by David Hahn, one-shot, 2010)
      - Red: Marvin Special (written by Erich Hoeber, drawn by Diego Olmos, one-shot, 2010)
      - Red: Frank Special (written by Gregory Noveck, drawn by Jason Masters, one-shot, 2010)
      - Red: Eyes Only (written and drawn by Cully Hamner, one-shot, 2011)
- Cliffhanger:
  - Tokyo Storm Warning #1–3 (with James Raiz, 2003) collected in Red/Tokyo Storm Warning (tpb, 144 pages, 2004, ISBN 1-4012-0283-7)
  - Two-Step #1–3 (with Amanda Conner, 2003–2004) collected as Two-Step (tpb, 128 pages, 2010, ISBN 1-4012-2887-9)
- Ocean #1–6 (with Chris Sprouse, 2004–2005) collected as Ocean (tpb, 160 pages, 2005, ISBN 1-4012-0849-5)
- Desolation Jones #1–8 (with J. H. Williams III and Danijel Žeželj (#7–8), 2005–2007)
  - In order to get ahead of the schedule, the series was put on hiatus which ended up being indefinite due to Ellis' alleged 2007 hard drive crash.
  - In 2011 and 2012 blogposts, Ellis stated the series is highly unlikely to return; it was initially announced to run for "at least 26 episodes".
  - Issues #1–6 are collected as Desolation Jones: Made in England (tpb, 144 pages, 2006, ISBN 1-4012-1150-X)

=== Avatar Press ===
Titles published by Avatar include:

- Gravel:
  - Gravel: Never a Dull Day (hc, 576 pages, 2008, ISBN 1-59291-050-5) collects:
    - Strange Kiss #1–3 (with Mike Wolfer, 1999–2000) also collected as Strange Kiss (tpb, 72 pages, 2001, ISBN 0-9706784-0-1)
    - Stranger Kisses #1–3 (with Mike Wolfer, 2001) also collected as Strange Kisses (tpb, 72 pages, 2002, ISBN 0-9706784-4-4)
    - Strange Killings #1–3 (co-written by Ellis and Mike Wolfer, art by Wolfer, 2002) also collected as Strange Killings (tpb, 72 pages, 2003, ISBN 1-59291-000-9)
    - Strange Killings: Body Orchard #1–6 (co-written by Ellis and Mike Wolfer, art by Wolfer, 2002–2003) also collected as Strange Killings: Body Orchard (tpb, 144 pages, 2004, ISBN 1-59291-013-0)
    - Strange Killings: Strong Medicine #1–3 (co-written by Ellis and Mike Wolfer, art by Wolfer, 2003) also collected as Strange Killings: Strong Medicine (tpb, 72 pages, 2004, ISBN 1-59291-024-6)
    - Strange Killings: Necromancer #1–6 (co-written by Ellis and Mike Wolfer, art by Wolfer, 2004) also collected as Strange Killings: Necromancer (tpb, 144 pages, 2006, ISBN 1-59291-033-5)
  - Gravel (co-written by Ellis and Mike Wolfer, art by Raulo Cáceres, Óscar Jiménez and Mike Wolfer, 2007–2010) collected as:
    - Bloody Liars (collects #0–7, hc, 192 pages, 2009, ISBN 1-59291-070-X; tpb, 2009, ISBN 1-59291-069-6)
    - The Major Seven (collects #8–14, hc, 176 pages, 2009, ISBN 1-59291-082-3; tpb, 2009, ISBN 1-59291-081-5)
    - The Last King of England (collects #15–21, hc, 176 pages, 2010, ISBN 1-59291-082-3; tpb, 2010, ISBN 1-59291-081-5)
  - Gravel: Combat Magician #0–4 (written by Mike Wolfer, art by Gabriel Rearte, 2013–2014)
- Threshold #25–30: "Dark Blue" (with Jacen Burrows, anthology, 2000) collected as Dark Blue (tpb, 72 pages, 2001, ISBN 0-9706784-3-6)
- Night Radio (unproduced 4-issue anthology series featuring serials by Ellis, Matt Fraction, Antony Johnston and Micaela Petersen, announced for 2002)
- Scars #1–6 (with Jacen Burrows, 2002–2003) collected as Scars (tpb, 164 pages, 2004, ISBN 1-59291-018-1)
- Warren Ellis' Blackgas (hc, 144 pages, 2007, ISBN 1-59291-046-7; tpb, 2007, ISBN 1-59291-045-9) collects:
  - Warren Ellis' Blackgas #1–3 (with Max Fiumara, 2006)
  - Warren Ellis' Blackgas 2 #1–3 (with Max Fiumara and Ryan Waterhouse (#3), 2006–2007)
- Warren Ellis' Wolfskin:
  - Volume 1 (hc, 120 pages, 2009, ISBN 1-59291-077-7; tpb, 2009, ISBN 1-59291-076-9) collects:
    - Warren Ellis' Wolfskin #1–3 (with Juan José Ryp, 2006–2007)
    - Wolfskin Annual #1 (story by Ellis; written by Mike Wolfer, drawn by Gianluca Pagliarani, 2008)
  - Volume 2 (hc, 160 pages, 2012, ISBN 1-59291-139-0; tpb, 2012, ISBN 1-59291-138-2) collects:
    - Wolfskin: Hundredth Dream #1–6 (story by Ellis; written by Mike Wolfer, drawn by Gianluca Pagliarani, 2010–2011)
- Black Summer #0–7 (with Juan José Ryp, 2007–2008) collected as Black Summer (hc, 192 pages, 2008, ISBN 1-59291-053-X; tpb, 2008, ISBN 1-59291-052-1)
- Doktor Sleepless #1–13 (with Ivan Rodriguez, 2007–2009)
  - Ellis has expressed interest in giving the series a definite conclusion but after several delays the final issue failed to materialize.
  - Issues #1–8 are collected as Doktor Sleepless: Engines of Desire (hc, 216 pages, 2008, ISBN 1-59291-055-6; tpb, 2008, ISBN 1-59291-054-8)
- FreakAngels (with Paul Duffield, a webcomic serialized at freakangels.com between 15 February 2008 and 5 August 2011) collected in print as:
  - Volume 1 (collects episodes #1–24, hc, 144 pages, 2008, ISBN 1-59291-057-2; tpb, 2008, ISBN 1-59291-056-4)
  - Volume 2 (collects episodes #25–48, hc, 144 pages, 2009, ISBN 1-59291-072-6; tpb, 2009, ISBN 1-59291-071-8)
  - Volume 3 (collects episodes #49–72, hc, 144 pages, 2009, ISBN 1-59291-079-3; tpb, 2009, ISBN 1-59291-078-5)
  - Volume 4 (collects episodes #73–96, hc, 144 pages, 2009, ISBN 1-59291-095-5; tpb, 2009, ISBN 1-59291-094-7)
  - Volume 5 (collects episodes #97–120, hc, 144 pages, 2011, ISBN 1-59291-116-1; tpb, 2011, ISBN 1-59291-115-3)
  - Volume 6 (collects episodes #121–144, hc, 144 pages, 2011, ISBN 1-59291-134-X; tpb, 2011, ISBN 1-59291-133-1)
- Anna Mercury (with Facundo Percio):
  - Anna Mercury #1–5 (2008) collected as Anna Mercury: The Cutter (hc, 144 pages, 2009, ISBN 1-59291-067-X; tpb, 2009, ISBN 1-59291-066-1)
  - Anna Mercury 2 began publishing in 2009 but went on hiatus after three issues. The final issue, announced for 2012, never materialized.
- No Hero #0–7 (with Juan José Ryp, 2008–2009) collected as No Hero (hc, 192 pages, 2010, ISBN 1-59291-085-8; tpb, 2010, ISBN 1-59291-084-X)
- Warren Ellis' Ignition City #1–5 (with Gianluca Pagliarani, 2009) collected as Warren Ellis' Ignition City Volume 1 (hc, 144 pages, 2010, ISBN 1-59291-088-2; tpb, 2010, ISBN 1-59291-087-4)
- Warren Ellis' Supergod #1–5 (with Garrie Gastonny, 2009–2010) collected as Warren Ellis' Supergod (hc, 128 pages, 2011, ISBN 1-59291-100-5; tpb, 2011, ISBN 1-59291-099-8)
- Captain Swing and the Electrical Pirates of Cindery Island #1–4 (with Raulo Cáceres, 2010) collected as Captain Swing and the Electrical Pirates of Cindery Island (hc, 128 pages, 2011, ISBN 1-59291-137-4; tpb, 2011, ISBN 1-59291-136-6)

==== Apparat ====
Titles published under Ellis' own label for standalone works include:

- Warren Ellis' Apparat: The Singles Collection Volume 1 (tpb, 112 pages, 2005, ISBN 1-59291-032-7) collects:
  - Warren Ellis' Frank Ironwine (with Carla Speed McNeil, one-shot, 2004)
  - Warren Ellis' Quit City (with Laurenn McCubbin, one-shot, 2004)
  - Warren Ellis' Simon Spector (with Jacen Burrows, one-shot, 2004)
  - Warren Ellis' Angel Stomp Future (with Juan José Ryp, one-shot, 2004)
- Warren Ellis' Crécy (with Raulo Cáceres, graphic novel, 48 pages, 2007, ISBN 1-59291-040-8)
- Aetheric Mechanics (with Gianluca Pagliarani, graphic novel, 48 pages, 2008, ISBN 1-59291-048-3)
- Frankenstein's Womb (with Marek Oleksicki, graphic novel, hc, 48 pages, 2009, ISBN 1-59291-075-0; sc, 2009, ISBN 1-59291-059-9)

=== Other publishers ===
Titles published by various publishers around the world include:

- Caliber:
  - The Sussex Vampire (adaptation of the short story by Arthur Conan Doyle; script by Ellis, art by Craig Gilmore, one-shot, 1996)
  - Calibrations #1–5: "Atmospherics" (with Ken Meyer, Jr., anthology, 1996) collected as Atmospherics (tpb, 48 pages, Avatar, 2002, ISBN 0-9706784-6-0; Color Edition tpb, 48 pages, 2012, ISBN 1-59291-145-5)
  - Negative Burn #37: "Better Living Through Chemistry" (with Brian Michael Bendis, anthology, 1996) collected in Brian Michael Bendis: Total Sell Out (tpb, 184 pages, Image, 2003, ISBN 1-58240-287-6)
- Vampirella (Harris):
  - Vampirella Masters Series Volume 2: Warren Ellis (tpb, 112 pages, Dynamite, 2010, ISBN 1-60690-190-7) collects:
    - Vampirella 25th Anniversary Special: "The Movement of Blood" (with Amanda Conner, anthology, 1996)
    - Vampirella Lives #1–3 (with Amanda Conner, 1996–1997)
    - Vampirella/Dracula: The Centennial: "Necromance" (with Mark Beachum, anthology one-shot, 1997)
  - Vampirella/Shi: "Nine Kinds of Dirt" (with Louis Small, Jr., one-shot, 1997) and Shi/Vampirella: "In Rashōmon" (with Kevin Lau, one-shot, Crusade Comics, 1997)
- Starship Troopers: Insect Touch #1–3 (with Davidé Fabbri and Paolo Parente, Dark Horse, 1997) collected in Starship Troopers (tpb, 152 pages, 1998, ISBN 1-56971-314-6)
  - Issues #2–3 are scripted by Gordon Rennie from a plot by Ellis and Rennie.
- Solar, Man of the Atom (with Darick Robertson, one-shot, Acclaim, 1997)
- No Justice/No Piece #2: "Manifesto" (with Robert Luedke, anthology, Head Press, 1998)
- Station (unproduced 3-issue limited series intended for publication by Silverline, announced for 1999)
- Bad Places (with Jason Shawn Alexander, aborted webcomic intended for serialization at Reactor, 2000)
- Superidol (with Colleen Doran, short 13-page story published online via Artbomb, 2002)
- The Operation (with Phil Hester, unproduced limited series intended for publication by Oni Press)
  - A short prelude story titled "Friday I'm in Love" was published in Oni Press Color Special '02 (anthology, 2002)
  - The production on the series was abandoned due to Hester reportedly overcommiting to various other projects.
- Switchblade Honey (with Brandon McKinney, graphic novel, 72 pages, AiT/Planet Lar, 2003, ISBN 1-932051-13-9)
- Hotwire (concept developed by Ellis and Steve Pugh — all stories are written and drawn by Pugh):
  - A1: Bojeffries Terror Tome #1: "Filthy" (plot by Ellis; anthology, Atomeka, 2005)
  - Hotwire: Requiem for the Dead #1–4 (plot by Ellis; Radical, 2009)
  - Hotwire: Deep Cut #1–3 (Radical, 2010–2011)
- SVK (with D'Israeli, one-shot, BERG, 2011)
- The Spirit of BACARDÍ (with Mike Allred, one-shot published online by Bacardi, 2014)
- Dynamite:
  - Blackcross #1–6 (with Colton Worley, 2015) collected as Blackcross (tpb, 160 pages, 2016, ISBN 1-60690-849-9)
  - James Bond (with Jason Masters, 2015–2016) collected as:
    - VARGR (collects #1–6, hc, 176 pages, 2016, ISBN 1-60690-901-0; tpb, 2017, ISBN 1-5241-0480-9)
    - Eidolon (collects #7–12, hc, 152 pages, 2017, ISBN 1-5241-0272-5; tpb, 2018, ISBN 1-5241-0694-1)
    - The Warren Ellis Collection (collects #1–12, hc, 328 pages, 2020, ISBN 1-5241-1504-5)
- Shipwreck #1–6 (with Phil Hester, Aftershock, 2016–2018) collected as Shipwreck (tpb, 144 pages, 2018, ISBN 1-935002-80-5)
- Finality (with Colleen Doran, a webcomic serialized at Webtoon, 2018–on indefinite hiatus due to Doran's health issues)

== Prose novels and short fiction ==
- Nature vol. 408 no. 6810: "At the Zoo" (short story, Nature Research, 2000)
- Available Light (collection of photos accompanied by short fictional text pieces, 64 pages, AiT/Planet Lar, 2002, ISBN 0-9709360-4-4)
- Crooked Little Vein (hc, 208 pages, William Morrow and Company, 2007, ISBN 0-06-072393-9; sc, 304 pages, 2008, ISBN 0-06-125205-0)
- Gun Machine (hc, 320 pages, Mulholland Books, 2013, ISBN 0-316-18740-2; sc, 2014, ISBN 0-316-18741-0)
- Dead Pig Collector (a 44-page novella published digitally via FSG Digital Originals, 2013)
- An Aura of Familiarity: "Lich-House" (short story for the online anthology book published by Institute for the Future, 2013)
- Brave New Now: "Foam" (short story for the anthology e-book published by Trienal de Arquitectura de Lisboa, 2014)
- Twelve Tomorrows Volume 3: "The Shipping Forecast" (short story for the anthology; 240 pages, MIT Press, 2014, ISBN 0-262-53559-9)
- Elektrograd: Rusted Blood (a 40-page novella published digitally via Summon Books, 2015)
- Headcold (short story published online at VICE Motherboard, 2016)
- Normal (160 pages, FSG Originals, 2016, ISBN 0-374-53497-7)
- Haunted Futures: "Ghostmakers" (short story for the anthology; 264 pages, Ghostwoods Books, 2017, ISBN 0-9576271-8-1)
- Watchtower (short story self-published online via Ellis' website, 2022)

== Nonfiction and newsletters ==
Newsletters:

- From the Desk of (1995–2001)
  - In 2000, Avatar collected some of the essays that appeared in the newsletter from 1995 to 1999.
  - The essays were published in the form of two 80-page volumes with spot illustrations by Jacen Burrows.
- Bad Signal (2001–2010)
  - In 2003, Avatar collected all of the essays that appeared in the newsletter between 15 Jan 2001 and 8 Jan 2003.
  - The essays were published in the form of two 64-page volumes again with spot illustrations by Jacen Burrows.
- Machine Vision (sponsored by Mulholland Books, 2012–2013)
- Orbital Operations (2013–present)

Columns:

- Come In Alone (for Comic Book Resources, 1999–2000)
- Pulp vol. 5 #1–6: "Pacific Radio" (Viz Media, 2001)
- Bad World (for OPi8, 2001)
  - In 2001, Avatar published a 3-issue eponymous series with illustrations by Jacen Burrows.
  - The series was eventually collected as Bad World (tpb, 80 pages, 2002, ISBN 0-9706784-8-7)
- Brainpowered (for Artbomb, 2002–2004)
- Second Life Sketches (for Reuters, 2007)
- The Sunday Hangover (for Suicide Girls, 2007)
- Wired UK (Condé Nast Publications, 2009–2011)
- Do Anything (for Bleeding Cool, 2009–2010)
- Good Morning, Sinners (for VICE, 2012–2013)
- Warren Ellis, Tech Columnist (for Esquire, 2015)

== Works about Ellis ==
- Meaney, Patrick (director). Warren Ellis: Captured Ghosts. Respect! Films and Sequart, 2011. Documentary film.
- Walker, Cody (editor). Keeping the World Strange: A Planetary Guide. Sequart, 2011.
- Thurman, Kevin and Darius, Julian. Voyage in Noise: Warren Ellis and the Demise of Western Civilization. Sequart, 2013.
- Nevett, Chad (editor). Shot in the Face: A Savage Journey to the Heart of Transmetropolitan. Sequart, 2013.
- Meaney, Patrick and Thurman, Kevin. Warren Ellis: The Captured Ghosts Interviews. Sequart, 2013.
