= David Baron (comics) =

American comic book colorist

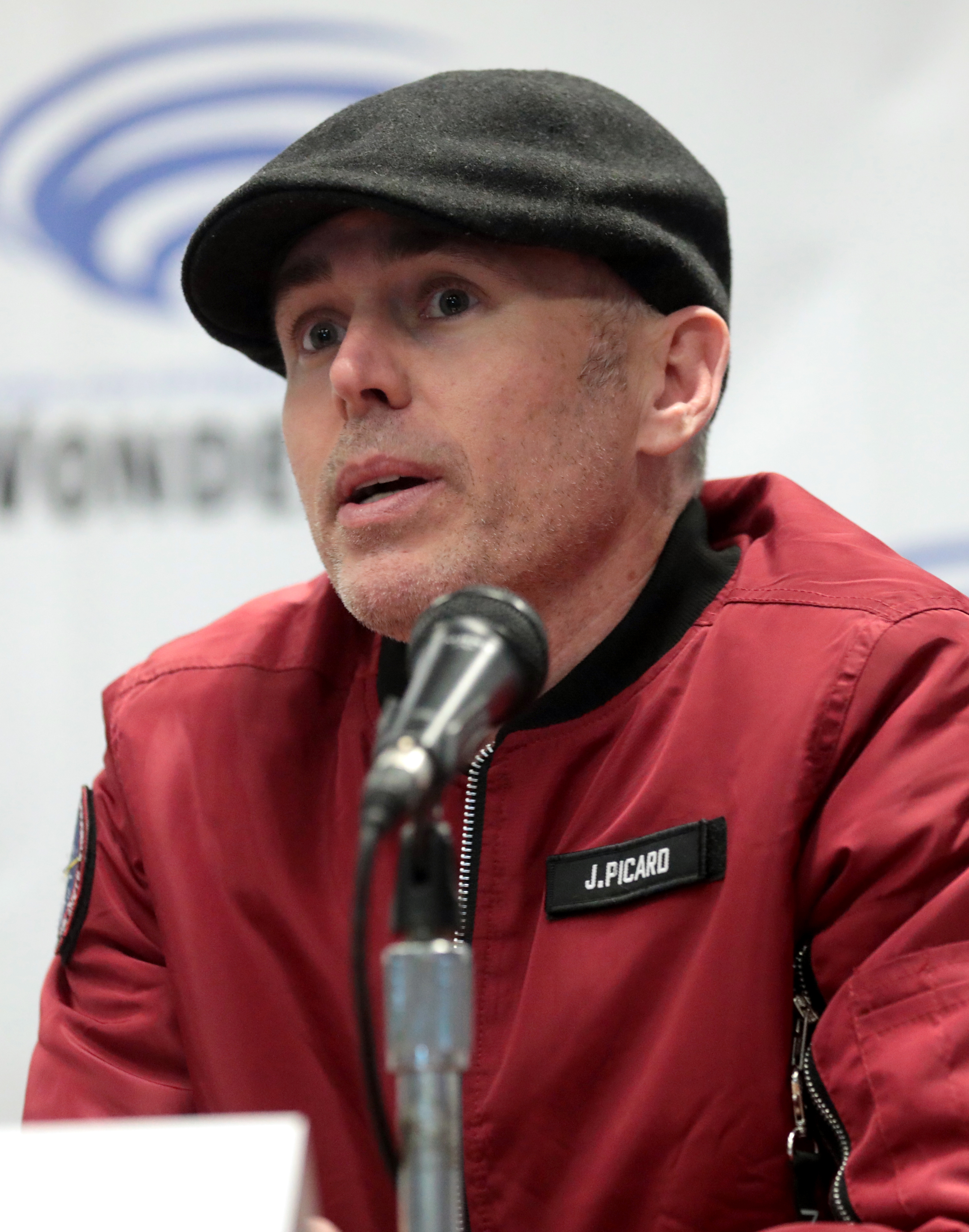
- Baron at the 2023 WonderCon
- Area: Colourist

David Baron is an American comic book colorist from San Diego.

== Career ==
Baron began his career at the age of 15, working for the coloring house InColor. He was subsequently hired by Wildstorm FX. After several years there, he left to pursue a freelance career. His work has primarily appeared in books published by WildStorm and DC Comics. Notably, he was the primary colorist on The Authority during the Mark Millar and Frank Quitely era, spent several years coloring JLA, and has recently colored several issues of DC Comics's weekly series, 52.

David Baron was under contract with DC Comics until July 2009.

== Bibliography ==
- Green Arrow and Black Canary
- Justice League Elite
- JLA
- Team Zero
- Batman Confidential
- JLA: Classified
- JSA: Classified
- Global Frequency #1-11 (with writer Warren Ellis and various artists, 12-issue limited series, Wildstorm, 2002–2004)
- 52
- Countdown #38-49 (DC Comics, 2008)
