= Gary Erskine =

Scottish comic book artist

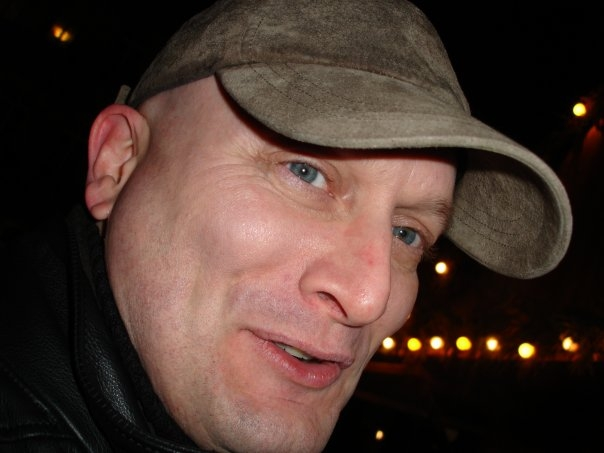
- Born: 23 October 1968 (age 58) Paisley, Scotland
- Area: Artist
- Notable works: Knights of Pendragon

Gary Erskine is a Scottish comic book artist.

== Career ==
Born in Paisley near Glasgow in 1968, Erskine grew up in Rutherglen and attended Burnside Primary and Stonelaw High School. Fellow comic artist Frank Quitely (Vincent Deighan) is the same age and from the same town, but they attended different schools and did not work together in their youth.

He started drawing work for fanzines while at art college and aspired to be a comic book artist. After sending samples of his work to Marvel UK he was eventually given Knights of Pendragon to draw on a regular basis in 1988. Erskine's work proved to be popular and he also drew Warheads for Marvel UK.

Erskine then expanded his work into 2000 AD, drawing a Judge Dredd story written by Garth Ennis. For 2000 AD, he also drew Flesh written by Dan Abnett and Steve White, and for 2000 AD's sister title Crisis he illustrated The Real Robin Hood, written by Michael Cook, in 1991. Working with writer John Tomlinson he drew the Lords of Misrule graphic novel for Tundra in 1993. The novel was based upon old British legends and urban myths and was well received.

Erskine by this time was drawing fill in issues for various DC Comics titles, but Silencers, a mini series written by Warren Ellis for Epic Comics was put on indefinite hold due to the collapse of Epic.

Erskine spent much of the 1990s doing guest artist work on various titles such as James Robinson's Firearm (a two part story set in a cyberspace/punked version of his native Glasgow), as well as a selection of Star Wars titles for Dark Horse. He also drew a mini series based upon The Terminator films for Malibu Comics.

In 2000, Silencers was finally printed by Image Comics as City of Silence, and Ellis and Erskine finally saw the story receive critical acclaim. The same year saw him ink Chris Weston on an issue of War Story written by Garth Ennis, as well as drawing two issues of Hellblazer for Vertigo. He also stepped in at the last minute to complete Mark Millar's run of The Authority.

In 2002, he again inked Chris Weston in the pages of Grant Morrison's The Filth. He also drew a Justice Society of America mini series in 2004 as well as another War Story.

In 2005, Erskine worked on Jack Cross, an ongoing series written by Warren Ellis for DC Comics, which stalled after the first story arc of four issues. Although mention of a further eight finished scripts and plots for twelve more issues was posted on various forums, the scripts were incomplete (requiring further dialoguing) and the book was placed on hiatus after the fourth issue. Later on, Ellis posted on his MySpace page that there will be "No more Jack Cross for DC". The rest of the year included digital painting of covers for X-Wing: Rogue Leader, a Star Wars mini series published by Dark Horse.

2006 brought about a new Vertigo series called Army@Love for Erskine to work on. The ongoing series written and pencilled by comic book veteran Rick Veitch is currently receiving good reviews from the industry and magazines, including Military Times. The story centres on a group of diverse characters and the problems with their relationships and the madness of corporate involvement/ sponsorship of a Middle Eastern War. DC Comics have billed the book as "Desperate Housewives meets The War five years in the future".

November 2007 saw the release of Garth Ennis' Dan Dare, published by Virgin Comics, and included full artwork by Erskine. The seven issue series saw the return of the classic British hero, previously published by 2000 AD and Eagle (in various interpretations) since the 1950s.

Erskine has also contributed character designs and storyboards for television, commercials and games development working with various companies over the last eighteen years. He has also worked on licensed properties such as the DreamWorks characters (including Shrek and Madagascar) and for Sony, and occasionally freelances with the award winning Glasgow studio Axis Animation.

Having moved to Fife, Erskine helped to organise a comic book convention in Glenrothes beginning in 2017, as well as attending similar events in Rutherglen as a recurring guest.

== Bibliography ==
- Knights of Pendragon (with Dan Abnett/John Tomlinson, Marvel UK, 1990–1993)
- Judge Dredd: "Twin Blocks" (with Garth Ennis and Gina Hart, in 2000 AD No. 741, 1991)
- Flesh: "Chronocide" (with Dan Abnett/Steve White, in 2000 AD #973–979, 1996)
- ZombieWorld: "Home for the Holidays" (with Gordon Rennie, one-shot, 1997, Dark Horse, collected in ZombieWorld: Winter's Dregs, 2005 ISBN 1-59307-384-4)
- Terminator: Nuclear Twilight (with Mark Paniccia, Malibu Comics)
- HyperSonic (with Dan Abnett/Steve White, Dark Horse, 1997–1998)
- City of Silence (with Warren Ellis, Image Comics, 2000)
- Hellblazer #144–145: "Ashes & Honey" (with Darko Macan, Vertigo, 2000)
- The Filth (inks, with Grant Morrison and pencils by Chris Weston, Vertigo, 13-issue mini-series, 2002, tpb, 2004 ISBN 1-4012-0013-3)
- The Authority: Brave New World No. 29 (with Mark Millar, Wildstorm, 2002, collected in Transfer of Power, Titan Books, ISBN 1-84023-490-3, DC Comics, ISBN 1-4012-0020-6)
- War Story (with Garth Ennis, Vertigo):
  - "Johann's Tiger"' (inks, with pencils by Chris Weston, one-shot, 2001, collected in tpb War Stories: Volume 1, 2004, ISBN 1-84023-912-3)
  - "Archangel" (one-shot, 2003, collected in tpb War Stories: Volume 2, 2006, ISBN 1-4012-1039-2)
- JSA Strange Adventures #1–6 – DC Comics, 2005
- Jack Cross (with Warren Ellis, 4-issue mini-series, DC Comics, 2005–2006)
- Osprey Graphic History:
  - Island of Terror: Battle of Iwo Jima (with Larry Hama and Anthony Williams, 48 pages, October 2006, ISBN 1-84603-055-2)
  - The Empire Falls: Battle of Midway (with Steve White and Richard Elson, 48 pages, October 2006, ISBN 1-84603-058-7)
  - Day of Infamy: Attack on Pearl Harbor (with Steve White and Jerrold Spahn, 48 pages, February 2007, ISBN 1-84603-059-5)
- Testament No. 16 (inks, with Douglas Rushkoff and pencils by Peter Gross, March 2007)
- Time Twisters: "Back to the Führer" (with Michael Carroll, in 2000 AD #1566, 2007)
- Army@Love (inks, with Rick Veitch, DC Comics, 2007, ongoing):
  - The Hot Zone Club (tpb, collects #1–5, 128 pages, October 2007, ISBN 1-4012-1474-6)
  - Generation Pwned (tpb, collects #6–12, 168 pages, July 2008, ISBN 1-4012-1832-6)
- Dan Dare (with Garth Ennis, 7-issue mini-series, Virgin Comics, November 2007 – May 2008, ongoing, tpb, hardcover, 208 pages, September 2008, ISBN 0-9814808-3-7)

== Sources ==
- Gary Erskine at the Grand Comics Database
- Gary Erskine at the Comic Book DB (archived from the original)
- Gary Erskine at Barney
