= Zurvan (disambiguation) =

Zurvan is the primordial creator deity in Zurvanism, a now-extinct branch of the Zoroastrianism religion.

Zurvan may also refer to:

- Time in Avestan Middle Persian
- Zurvan (زروان), a village in Larestan County, Fars, Iran.

In popular culture:

- Zarvan (زَروان), the personification of time in Shahnameh
- Zurvan, an alien intelligence in the Palladium Books RPG games that sometimes creates gods as an experiment
- Zurvan, the primary antagonist of Prince of Persia: The Two Thrones
- Zur-van, a superhero in Grant Morrison's The Filth (comics)
- Zurvan, the name of one of the Four Gods of Runepunk in Savage Worlds
- Zurvan, a minor antagonist in StarCraft II: Heart of the Swarm
- Zurvan, the name of one of the Amp Stations in Planetside 2

== See also ==
- Aion (deity) (Αἰών)
- Chronos (Χρόνος, "time")
- Father Time
- Janus
