= Jason Howard =

American comic book artist

- Born: United States
- Areas: Inker, Colorist
- Notable works: Trees; The Astounding Wolf-Man
- Children: Jacob Howard Joshua Howard Kaylin Howard Zachary Nunn

Jason Howard is an American comic book artist known for such comics as Trees with Warren Ellis and The Astounding Wolf-Man with Robert Kirkman.
