= Jack Cross =

Comic book series by Warren Ellis

- Cover to Jack Cross #1.

Publication information
- Publisher: DC Comics
- Format: Ongoing series
- Publication date: 2005
- No. of issues: 4

Creative team
- Written by: Warren Ellis
- Artist: Gary Erskine

Jack Cross is a comic book series written by Warren Ellis and drawn by Gary Erskine. It was first published by DC Comics in 2005.

== Plot ==
The title character is a gun-for-hire freelance anti-terrorist, who is brought in when things go horribly wrong, and who uses extremely violent methods to achieve his goals. However, he is also an active social liberal who takes part in anti-war demonstrations, and is internally conflicted about the measures he has to take.

== Publication history ==
Originally solicited as an ongoing series, Jack Cross stalled after the first story arc of four issues. Although a mention of a further eight finished scripts (and plots for twelve more issues) was posted on various forums the scripts were incomplete (requiring further dialoguing), the book was placed on hiatus after the fourth issue. Later on, Ellis posted on his MySpace page that there will be "no more Jack Cross for DC".

Issues #1–4 were published in one volume as DC Comics Presents: Jack Cross #1 in October 2010.

== See also ==
- City of Silence, a previous collaboration between Ellis and Erskine
