= Canon Fodder =

- 2000 AD #981

Publication information
- Publisher: IPC Media (Fleetway)
- First appearance: 2000 AD #861 (November 1993)
- Created by: Mark Millar; Chris Weston

Canon Fodder is a British science fiction strip created by Mark Millar and Chris Weston and published in the magazine 2000 AD. It features the adventures of the eponymous character Canon Fodder, the sole survivor of the Priest Patrol, a bizarre cross between the police and the church who patrol the streets of a future London after Judge Dredd's sequence Judgment Day has caused the dead to rise, and society to break down.

== Publication history ==
Canon Fodder first appeared in 1993, with a sequel written by Nigel Long (as "Kek-W") in 1995. A dispute between Fleetway and Mark Millar regarding ownership of the character prevented further development. Millar had stopped working for 2000 AD by the time the second series was created and objected to the series being continued in his absence. Artist Chris Weston has since said that he only agreed to illustrate the second series because he thought the character was the property of 2000 AD. 2000 AD's editor, David Bishop, shelved plans to continue the series to avoid offending Millar.

== Cast ==
- Canon Fodder: The last surviving member of the Priest Patrol; the other members were Deacon Blue, Father O'Blivion, and Cardinal Syn. He was a judge at a beauty pageant the day his comrades were horribly killed. Canon is a highly competent fighter, firmly grounded in his belief in God, but is also impatient, quick to anger and has no patience for sinners, issuing harsh punishments to even those who confess voluntarily. He has a mechanical right hand, replacing the one lost while fighting Lucifer.
- Sadie: Canon's housekeeper. Although they have feelings for each other, neither have ever told the other.

== Plot ==
=== Canon Fodder ===
The story opens with a badly wounded Canon Fodder being confronted by Lucifer who then apparently finishes him off. It then cuts to a flashback with Dr. Watson discovering that Sherlock Holmes and Professor Moriarty have killed themselves in a suicide pact, in order to go to heaven and kill God for not appearing on Judgement Day. Fodder and Watson recruit Mycroft Holmes (who is portrayed as a psychopath similar to Hannibal Lecter), to get them to heaven before Holmes and Moriarty. However, Holmes and Moriarty were themselves too late, and discover that Lucifer has overthrown and killed God. Fodder and his comrades arrive on the scene to be confronted by Lucifer, whose demons kill Watson and Mycroft and rip off Fodder's hand. As Lucifer is about to finish Fodder off, God unexpectedly returns. He kills Lucifer and asks why he shouldn't wipe out mankind, but Fodder points out that without mankind, God will never find the answer to who created him. The story ends with Dr Watson completing his entry in the Purgatory journals as the last adventure of Sherlock Holmes.

=== Dark Matter ===
After a failed attempt at stopping a hostage crisis in a church, Canon is locked up in Bedlam asylum, being treated by Sigmund Freud. He is freed by Deacon Blue, one of the vanished members of the Priest Patrol, who reveals that the Priest Patrol (apart from Fodder, who was judging the "Miss Purity 2000" pageant) were investigating the League of Anabolic Atheists when they were sucked into another dimension. Blue managed to escape and return to the real world, and now wants Fodder to return with him to rescue their colleagues. Freud, Fodder and Blue travel to the other dimension, which seems to be the collective unconscious, where Deacon Blue turns out to be a demon in disguise, and the rescue mission a trap. Fodder is rescued in the nick of time by a trans-dimensional airship captained by Jules Verne. Returning to the normal universe, he is briefed by Albert Einstein and Wilhelm Reich on the threat posed by the accelerating expansion of the dimension they have just come from, which it seems is composed of dark matter, and which is feeding on humanity's fears and dark desires. Reich has constructed an "Orgone Bomb" which can destroy the dark matter universe, and Fodder returns there to detonate it. After facing down his deepest fear he detonates the device expecting to die but is amazed to discover he has instead set free the Goddess who was imprisoned in the universe and who returns him to the normal universe.

== Collected editions ==
- "Canon Fodder" (with Mark Millar, in 2000 AD #861-867, 1993, collected in Judge Dredd Megazine Supplement 4, 2008)
- "Dark Matter" (with Nigel Long writing as "Kek-W", in 2000 AD #980-987, 1995, collected in Judge Dredd Megazine Supplement 17, 2009)
- ''Boże Działo'' (collects 2000 AD #861-867, #980-987, Polish edition by Studio Lain, 2019)
