= Ministry of Space =

Comic book story series

- Cover of Ministry of Space vol. 1, March 2005, trade paperback collected edition, art by Chris Weston

Publication information
- Publisher: Image Comics
- Schedule: Irregular
- Format: Limited series
- Genre: Alternate history, science fiction
- Publication date: April 2001 – April 2004
- No. of issues: 3

Creative team
- Created by: Warren Ellis; Chris Weston
- Written by: Warren Ellis
- Artist: Chris Weston
- Letterer: Mike Heisler
- Colorist: Laura Martin

Collected editions
- Hardcover: ISBN 1-58240-424-0

Ministry of Space is a three-part alternate history mini-series written by Warren Ellis, published by American company Image Comics in 2001-2004. The book's art is by Chris Weston, and depicts retro technology in "British" style.

The story is set in an alternate history where soldiers and operatives of the United Kingdom reached the German rocket installations at Peenemünde ahead of the Americans and the Soviets, and brought all the key personnel and technology to Britain, in a mirror of the real world's Operation Paperclip and Operation Osoaviakhim. This led to the establishment of the Ministry of Space, whose mission is to develop British space technology and establish a firm foothold in space for Queen and Empire.

== Publication history ==
Originally intended as a three-part monthly series, Ministry of Space was first released in May 2001. Delays prompted the release of issue #2 in September 2001 instead of June. The last issue finally saw print in April 2004, three years late. No specific reason has been given for the delays.

In his afterword to the series, Ellis speaks of how Ministry of Space came to be, after he found in his attic a lost, forgotten copy of the Dan Dare comic The Man From Nowhere, a science fiction comics from the 1950s.

== Plot ==
The narrative moves back and forth between the last days of World War II, the first few years of the British space programme, and the year 2001. The British had captured and relocated to England all the scientists and equipment found in Peenemünde, among them Dr. Wernher von Braun and the plans and pieces of the V-2 rocket bomb. American advance troops near Peenemünde are then (intentionally) obliterated by friendly fire, so that they cannot challenge the emergent British technological advantage.

The entire scheme is masterminded by Royal Air Force officer Air Commodore Sir John Dashwood, a survivor of the Battle of Britain, who manages to convince Winston Churchill to establish the Ministry of Space and fund it with a black budget. The following years see the British:

- Breaking the sound barrier (1946).
- Launching the first artificial satellite in 1948, called Victory and radio-broad-casting "God save the King" in Morse Code.
- Pioneering human spaceflight (1950), in a reinforced and pressurized cabin, in a rocketplane named Britannia, wearing leather flight jackets and sitting in a leather chair. John Dashwood becomes the first man in space. He loses his legs in the process, but receives a knighthood.
- Building a space station (1953–1956) named "Churchill Station".
- Expanding the National Service Act 1948, which now includes service in the "Royal Space Force".
- Landing on the Moon (1957) and in 1960 finding water on the Moon.
- Establishing a colonial base on Mars in 1969, with nuclear motors and 700 people.

The story ends in 2001 and involves an American attempt to go into space, and their blackmailing of the British government concerning the secrets of the black budget that funded the Ministry of Space (which was derived from looted gold reserves from Jewish victims of the Holocaust). However, thanks to Dashwood's crimes, the British space programme has a crewed spacecraft that has reached Saturn, thriving British Martian and lunar colonies, asteroid belt mines and at least three Earth orbital space stations providing the country with free solar energy. The unrepentant Dashwood dismisses the Ministry's outrage at its origins with the claim that England will not care about the truth when it has reaped such benefits from the programme. However, the price of progress is hinted at in a closing page that shows that the culturally static Empire practices segregationism; the black female pilot that flew Dashwood to one of the space stations for questioning is shown to be staying in the "Non-White Women Staff" quarters.

== Collected editions ==
The series has been collected into a single volume, in both softcover (March 2005, Image, ISBN 1-58240-423-2, Titan, ISBN 1-84023-924-7) and hardcover editions (Image, March 2005, ISBN 1-58240-424-0).

== Awards ==
The series won the Sidewise Award for Alternate History (short form) in 2005.

== See also ==
- Air Ministry
