= The Filth (comics) =

2002-2003 comic book limited series

- Cover to The Filth #13

Publication information
- Publisher: Vertigo
- Schedule: Monthly
- Publication date: August 2002 - October 2003
- No. of issues: 13

Creative team
- Written by: Grant Morrison
- Penciller: Chris Weston
- Inker: Gary Erskine

The Filth is a comic book limited series, written by Grant Morrison and drawn by Chris Weston and Gary Erskine. It was published by the Vertigo imprint of American company DC Comics in 2002.

== Publication history ==
The Filth was Grant Morrison's second major creator-owned series for Vertigo after The Invisibles. Initially starting as a Nick Fury proposal for Marvel Comics, (Note: Said story eventually became Nick's World.) Morrison adapted it as a 13-part series for Vertigo. The title refers both to the police (in British slang) and to pornography (in which Morrison "immersed" themselves while "researching" the series). Morrison has said that the series is their favorite among their works.

== Plot ==
The series tells the story of Greg Feely, a bachelor whose main interests are his cat and masturbating to pornography. Feely is actually a member of a shadowy organization called The Hand and their attempts to keep society on the path to the "Status Q".

== Themes and motifs ==
The Filth can be seen partly as a companion piece to The Invisibles in that it touches upon similar themes and concepts such as fractal realities, art affecting life, postmodern blurring of the fourth wall and the world as a single, living organism with humans as the cells that compose it. Morrison has stated that they had originally intended to make The Filth a thematic sequel to The Invisibles, followed by a third comic book series, The Indestructible Man. Morrison later concluded that their original Flex Mentallo series formed the first in the trilogy. Therefore, the sequence runs: 1. Flex Mentallo. 2. The Invisibles, 3. The Filth. The theme of The Filth consists of immersion into, and eventual redemption from, the forces of negativity.

== Synopsis ==
Greg Feely lives alone in London though he cares deeply for animals such as his pet cat Tony. One day, a strange woman in his bathroom tells him he is the chemically-induced "para-personality" of Ned Slade, a secret agent for an agency called the Hand (or, informally, "the Filth"). The Filth protects Status: Q (the status quo) by suppressing threats to "social hygiene". In the course of completing assignments for The Hand, Greg Feely discovers that he is the original person, and Slade – like all Hand agents – is merely a synthetic character who can be installed in any body the Hand chooses. He spends the rest of the story trying to come to grips with this and deciding what to do about it.

== Collected editions ==
A trade paperback of all 13 issues was released in 2004 (ISBN 1401200133).

A newer deluxe edition featuring all 13 issues alongside extra sketches and commentary by Morrison was released in 2017 (ISBN 9781401270445).

== See also ==
- The Invisibles
- Flex Mentallo

== Sources ==
- The Filth at the Grand Comics Database
- The Filth at the Comic Book DB (archived from the original)
