= Blackgas =

2006–2007 comic book limited series

Warren Ellis Blackgas

Publication information
- Publisher: Avatar Press
- Schedule: Bi-Monthly
- Format: Mini-series
- Genre
- Publication date: January – May 2006; October 2006 – June 2007
- No. of issues: 3; 3

Creative team
- Written by: Warren Ellis
- Penciller: Max Fiumara
- Inker(s): Max Fiumara; Sebastian Fiumara
- Colorist: Andrew Dalhouse
- Editor: William Christensen

Collected editions
- Hardcover: ISBN 1-59291-046-7

Warren Ellis Blackgas is a two volume comic book mini-series written by Warren Ellis, illustrated by Max Fiumara, and published by American company Avatar Press from 2006 to 2007.

The first volume deals with two lovers trapped on an island where a Black Gas has turned the residents into zombie-like creatures. The second volume deals with the effects of the Black Gas on the mainland.

== Publication history ==
Each issue was published with one standard and three variant covers (Terror, Gore, and Wraparound). The first issue also received a "Blood Foil" variant cover that was initially only available at conventions but later sold through Avatar's website.

== Plot ==
=== Volume 1 ===
Tyler and his girlfriend Soo travel to Tyler's hometown, Smoky Island, to meet his parents. After arriving, Soo is told the enigmatic history of Smoky Island; it is considered to be a lost colony and the original inhabitants of the island were all wiped out in what historians speculate was some sort of civil war, in which many were dismembered and sexually violated. After a brief meeting with Tyler's parents, the young couple retreat into a cabin away from town that's located on the other side of the Island's mountainous bulge. Shortly after arriving at the cabin, an earthquake occurs that releases an ominous Black Gas away from the cabin and down on the town. Recalling some of the old legends of Smoky Island, Tyler arms himself and both he and Soo go to investigate what effect the gas has had on the island's inhabitants. As they make their way down the mountain, Soo and Tyler quickly discover that the people of the island are no longer human; they have become psychotic cannibalistic creatures with black ooze leaking out of their eye sockets.

After battling their way through the woods and the town, Soo and Tyler arrive at his parents' place only to discover that every one on the island, including Tyler's mother and father, have been transformed. The duo battle their way through a mob of monsters and discover Doctor Menlove, a person they had met earlier in the story before the gas was released by the earthquake. The doctor's transformation has been delayed because he was high on marijuana when the Black Gas came; he explains that the chemicals make the mind and body change, creating an insatiable hunger and a primitive desire to eat and kill. He gives them the keys to his boat and then begs for death. As Tyler and Soo battle off a group of islanders, the doctor warns them that the toxin from the Black Gas is excreted from the tears and saliva of the infected. The couple makes a break for the boat but once they escape the island, Soo realises that Tyler has become infected and she has to kill him. The horror doesn't end there, Soo approaches the mainland (possibly somewhere in New England) only to see the city ablaze and in a state of anarchy.

=== Volume 2 ===
Soo arrives in the city and sees it is just like the island. She encounters a pair of police officers, Johnny Rader and Wilmont, and explains to them what happened on Smoky Island and how the toxins are spread. Wilmont has been bitten and Soo quickly puts a bullet through his brain after a standoff between Wilmont and Rader. A helicopter flies overhead but rather than offer help it drops a bomb on the hospital where uninfected were taking refuge and then begins tailing Soo and Rader. The two are able to escape the chopper and take cover in an abandoned building. Rader uses his squad car radio to request an evacuation but a monster driving a car destroys the rescue helicopter and their squad car. Realizing the gravity of the situation, Rader decides that no one can be allowed to escape the area. He shoots Soo, whose mind has snapped from the horror, puts on riot armour, arms himself to the teeth, and goes on the offensive. Rader begins annihilating the monsters by blowing up gas stations and buildings, only to look up and see a F-117A stealth bomber dropping a nuclear device on the city. The explosion creates a giant cloud of Black Gas that begins spreading over the entire planet.

== Zombies ==
Throughout the series the characters frequently refer to the monsters as Zombies; however they do not fit the classical definitions of being reanimated corpses or will-less people controlled by another. The Black Gas transforms people and animals into aggressive murderous carnivores that seem indifferent to most injury, but they are definitely not mindless and in fact carry on conversations with their victims. The monsters are aware of their acts yet are unable to help themselves. In some cases they express regret at what they are doing yet are unable to stop, whereas others seem to show no remorse whatsoever. The infection is spread by the monsters through saliva and tears, so being bitten can transform a regular person into a monster. The solicitations for the series also advertise it as a "full-color zombie epic!”

Ellis has said "The Warren Ellis zombie, in its early phase, is actually aware of what's happening to its brain and body. In its early phase, the 'Blackgas' zombie can actually talk." Although there are classic elements of the zombie genre (cannibalism and the bite spreading the infection) Ellis has concentrated on other aspects stating "the big thing is psychological: the black gas releases the worst things in our heads. They don't just eat people. They do utterly disgusting things. All that black stuff in the back of our brains that we never act on... That all comes out. They're out of control, but technically they're not mindless. They're just beyond reasoning with"

== Collected editions ==
A trade paperback collection of the series was published by Avatar Press in 2007 (ISBN 1592910459) as was a hardcover (ISBN 1592910467).
