= Crooked Little Vein =

2007 novel by Warren Ellis

- First US edition cover
- Author: Warren Ellis
- Language: English
- Genre: Hardboiled detective, transgressive fiction, thriller
- Publisher: William Morrow
- Publication date: July 24, 2007
- Publication place: United States
- Media type: Print (Hardback)
- Pages: 304 (first edition, hardback)
- ISBN: 0-06-072393-9 (first edition, hardback)
- OCLC: 80361435
- Dewey Decimal: 813/.6 22
- LC Class: PS3555.L61717 C76 2007

Crooked Little Vein is the first novel by comic book writer Warren Ellis, published by William Morrow on July 24, 2007.

The novel is written in the first-person, similar to much of the hardboiled detective genre. The book was based on research material posted on Ellis' websites, mostly odd news items and disturbing pictures from the web that the author had found or had been sent.

The novel has been translated into Spanish, German, French, Czech, and Italian.

== Plot summary ==
Michael McGill, a burned-out private eye is hired by a corrupt, heroin-addicted White House Chief of Staff to find a second "secret" United States Constitution, which had been lost in a whorehouse by Richard Nixon. What follows is a scavenger hunt across America, exposing its seedier side along the way. McGill is joined by a college student, Trix, who is writing a thesis on sexual fetishes.

McGill has to deal with strange events sometimes unrelated to his adventures – he describes himself as a "shit-magnet", with weird phenomena following him wherever he goes.

== Critical reception ==
About.com reviewer Jonathan Lasser called Crooked Little Vein "an ace put-up job" and wrote that it was "evidence that freedom is more valuable than repression".

Whitney Pastorek, reviewing for Entertainment Weekly, noted that the work "is not for the faint of heart" and that Ellis has "got a bright future outside of the picture books".
