= Gun Machine =

2013 novel by Warren Ellis

- 2013 hardback first edition
- Author: Warren Ellis
- Language: English
- Genre: Hardboiled detective, thriller
- Publisher: Mulholland Books
- Publication date: 1 January 2013
- Publication place: United States
- Media type: Print (hardback)
- Pages: 308 pages

Gun Machine is a hardboiled detective thriller novel written by English author Warren Ellis. The novel, Ellis' second, was released on 1 January 2013 through Mulholland Books, and reached The New York Times Best Seller list. It follows Detective John Tallow as he becomes involved in a mystery surrounding several unsolved homicides. Ellis intended the book to serve as a contrast to police procedurals such as CSI, which he dubbed "bedtime stories".

Television rights have been sold to 20th Century Fox TV and Chernin Entertainment.

== Plot summary ==
While answering a public disturbance call on Pearl Street, NYPD Detective John Tallow's partner of twenty years is killed by a depressed apartment tenant. Tallow eventually kills the tenant, but the brief exchange of gunfire reveals in the apartment's inside wall was filled with firearms. The firearms are revealed to have each been murder weapons in hundreds of unsolved killings over the last decade, the trophy room of an extremely prolific serial killer. Tallow, assisted by a pair of forensic analysts Bat and Scarly, are given the nearly impossible task of finding the killer behind the murders.

Meanwhile, the book cuts occasionally to the perspective of the former owner of the guns, a man referred to as The Hunter, a high-functioning schizophrenic who perceives New York both in its modern appearance and as it appeared before the arrival of settlers. As Tallow works on the case he begins to understand the 'trophy room' has some greater meaning to The Hunter, discovering that the guns have a connection to the people who they killed, either a reference to the make or use of the gun or even puns. He believes the guns are selected for some higher purpose, that understanding the pattern and the purpose of the construction will help him discover the killer.

Eventually he unravels a conspiracy that ties a banker, the Assistant Chief of Police, and the CEO of a private security company to the mysterious killer, using him as a hitman for their own personal gain. Tallow, Bat, and Scarly ambush The Hunter at Tallow's apartment. Bat is non-fatally shot, and Tallow chases down and captures The Hunter at a police building that the Assistant Chief had given him access to hide in. Following The Hunter's capture the Assistant Chief is charged with the crime while the banker disappears out of country and the private security CEO kills himself with his wife. Tallow speaks with The Hunter, in prison and taking anti-psychotics for his schizophrenia, and confirms his suspicion that the room of guns was a Native American wampum, a kind of symbolic language made with beads. The purpose of the wampum in the killer's deranged mind, once completed, would be to supernaturally eject the White-European settler Americans from New York with all of its modern culture and return New York to its pre-industrial state.

== Adaptations ==
=== Television series ===
Ellis stated in 2012 that rights for Gun Machine had been purchased by the 20th Century Fox TV and Chernin Entertainment, with the intent of turning it into a television series. He also confirmed that he would serve as executive producer for the potential series along with Dario Scardapane, Peter Chernin and Katherine Pope. In April 2014, Microsoft announced that Xbox Entertainment Studios acquired the television rights as part of its Xbox Originals exclusive television programming initiative; Ellis would be executive producer along with Brett Conrad, who signed on to write the pilot.

=== Trailers ===
Trailers for Gun Machine, one of which was narrated by Wil Wheaton, were released shortly after the book's street date. The trailers were well received, with io9 calling the second trailer "creeptastic".

== Reception ==
Critical reception for Gun Machine has been mostly positive, with The A.V. Club giving the book a "B" rating. The New York Times gave a mixed review, calling it a "pleasingly quirky crime thriller" while stating that the ending felt "a little unsatisfying" due to how neatly everything was wrapped up. Common praise for the book centred on the depictions of the characters, which The Independent dubbed "wonderfully fleshed out".
