= Global Frequency =

Comic book limited series

- Cover of Global Frequency #1, by Brian Wood.

Publication information
- Publisher: Wildstorm (DC Comics)
- Schedule: Irregular
- Format: Limited series
- Genre: Science fiction, techno-thriller
- Publication date: December 2002 – August 2004
- No. of issues: 12
- Main character(s): Miranda Zero; Aleph

Creative team
- Created by: Warren Ellis
- Written by: Warren Ellis
- Artist(s): Garry Leach (#1); Glenn Fabry (#2); Steve Dillon (#3); Roy Martinez (#4); Jon J. Muth (#5); David Lloyd (#6); Simon Bisley (#7); Lee Bermejo (#9); Tomm Coker (#10); Jason Pearson (#11); Gene Ha (#12); Brian Wood (all covers)
- Penciller: Chris Sprouse (#8)
- Inker(s): Liam Sharp (#2); Karl Story (#8)
- Letterer: Michael Heisler
- Colorist(s): David Baron (#1–11); Art Lyon (#12)
- Editor: Scott Dunbier

Collected editions
- Planet Ablaze: ISBN 1-4012-0274-8
- Detonation Radio: ISBN 1-4012-0291-8

Global Frequency is an American comic book science fiction limited series created and written by Warren Ellis and published by Wildstorm Productions, an imprint of DC Comics.

The series is set in the present day, consisting of single-issue, standalone stories. The 12 issues were published between October 2002 and June 2004. Each issue was drawn by a different artist, with uniform covers by Brian Wood, and interior artwork colored by David Baron.

== Overview ==
The Global Frequency is an independent, covert intelligence organization headed by a former intelligence agent who uses the alias of Miranda Zero. Reportedly, 1,001 people are on the Global Frequency, forming an active smart mob communicating by specially modified video mobile phones through a central dispatch system coordinated by a young woman code-named Aleph.

The purpose of the organization is to protect and rescue the world from the consequences of the various secret projects that the governments and individuals of the world have established, which are unknown to the public at large. The people on the Global Frequency are chosen for their specialized skills in a variety of areas, and include military personnel, intelligence agents, police detectives, scientific researchers, academics, athletes, former criminals and assassins. The threats addressed by the organization are equally varied and usually world-threatening, including rogue military operations, paranormal phenomena, terrorist attacks and religious cults.

The existence of the organization is an open secret, but its membership list is anonymous, the identities of its field agents unknown to even each other before they meet on a mission. Often, the only way to tell a member of the Global Frequency is by the phones that they carry or the Global Frequency symbol—a circle with four points on its perimeter 90°s apart that they sport somewhere on their person.

Who exactly funds the Global Frequency is not known. Zero has said that at least some of the money comes from the G8 governments that pay the Frequency for not revealing the various secret horrors that they combat. Although the presence of an independent, unaccountable agency with strike capability makes some authorities nervous, they also recognize the fact that the Frequency has the skills, the reach, and more importantly, the will to act where governments cannot. As a result, the organization gets tacit approval for its activities, and is sometimes called on by governments to deal with extraordinary crises. Mostly, the organization acts proactively as it discovers such threats.

Ellis designed the comic series like a television series with standalone "episodes", allowing the reader to begin with any issue and be able to understand what was going on. As a result, the only regular characters in the series are Miranda Zero and Aleph, with only a few other characters making a reappearance in the 12th issue of the series. This also heightened the suspense for the reader, as the survival of these characters was not guaranteed.

== Collected editions ==
The series has been collected into two trade paperbacks. After the WildStorm imprint was discontinued, the entire series was collected under the Vertigo label in 2013, with a Deluxe Edition under the DC Comics label in 2018.

- Global Frequency Volume 1: Planet Ablaze (collects Global Frequency #1–6, ISBN 1-4012-0274-8)
- Global Frequency Volume 2: Detonation Radio (collects Global Frequency #7–12, ISBN 1-4012-0291-8)
- Global Frequency (collects Global Frequency #1–12, ISBN 978-1-4012-3797-4)
- Global Frequency, The Deluxe Edition (collects Global Frequency #1–12, ISBN 978-1-4012-7820-5)

== Awards ==
The series was nominated for "Best Limited Series" in the 2004 edition of the Eisner Award.

== In other media ==
Miranda Zero (Michelle Forbes, right) and Aleph (Aimee Garcia, left) from the Global Frequency pilot.

Mark Burnett prepared a Global Frequency television series for 2005 with Michelle Forbes as Miranda Zero, Josh Hopkins as Sean Flynn, Jenni Baird as Dr. Katrina Finch and Aimee Garcia as Aleph. The characters of Sean Flynn, an ex-policeman who accidentally stumbled on a Global Frequency mission, and Katrina Finch, a brilliant scientist with expertise in multiple fields, were created especially for the series.

Unlike the comic book, which had an ever-changing cast of field agents, Flynn and Finch were to be regulars along with Zero and Aleph, with other Frequency members coming in as and when necessary in supporting roles. This would allow for the character continuity expected of a television series, and yet allow other characters to be killed off, as in the comic book.

A pilot episode, based heavily on the first issue of the comic book, was produced, but The WB (the original intended network) did not commission the series. John Rogers was the principal creative force behind the television incarnation, writing the pilot episode, with Ellis credited as producer and creator. Other writers waiting to come on board included David Slack, Ben Edlund, and Diego Gutierrez. The pilot was directed by Nelson McCormick.

The unaired pilot was leaked onto the Internet in June 2005. Although it received positive reactions from those who watched it, Ellis said that the leak annoyed Warner Brothers to the extent that they killed the project.

In November 2009, Production Weekly's Twitter feed revealed that a new television adaptation of Global Frequency was being worked on by The CW Television Network and writer Scott Nimerfro, while a new pilot by Jerry Bruckheimer and written by Rockne S. O'Bannon was reportedly being produced by Fox in November 2014, but by February 2015, Fox did not order the pilot due to problems with the script.
