= Trees (comics) =

Comic-book series

- Cover of Trees #1

Publication information
- Publisher: Image Comics
- Publication date: (vol. 1); May 2014 - August 2016 (Three Fates); September 2019 - January 2020
- No. of issues: (vol. 1); 14 (Three Fates); 5

Creative team
- Written by: Warren Ellis
- Artist: Jason Howard

Collected editions
- In Shadows: ISBN 978-1632152701
- Two Forests: ISBN 978-1632155221
- Three Fates: ISBN 978-1534315099

Trees is a science fiction comic book series by Warren Ellis and Jason Howard, published by American company Image Comics. The first issue was published May 28, 2014. The narrative begins ten years after the arrival of massive and silent alien presences who stand on the surface of the earth like the "Trees" of the title, not moving and seeming to take no account of human life and society. While a high concept science fiction story, the series also concerns itself with a cross-section of social and cultural issues as experienced by the characters, including police states, feminism, economic disparity, and transgender identity.

A second series titled Trees: Three Fates was published starting in September 2019. These issues were originally intended to be published as issues 15-19 of volume 1.

== Plot ==
The narrative is divided into several points of view, all centered on the landing site of one of the Trees. Such locations include Rio de Janeiro, Mogadishu, New York City, "The City of Shu", Cefalù, and Spitsbergen. The individual stories, while featuring the Tree sites as settings, having varying degrees of explicit storytelling related to the Trees themselves.

The first volume, In Shadows, divides attention between an Italian woman involved reluctantly with a group of neo-fascists, an African leader hoping to use the Trees as a source of military leverage over neighboring nations, and a young Chinese artist from rural farmland joining an eclectic urban art collective. Finally, as a sort of core narrative, a science team researching a Tree in Norway finds mysterious black flowers growing near the base of the object, culminating in unexpected activity from the seemingly dormant Trees.

The second volume Two Forests, also splits attention between narratives, primarily between a newly christened Mayor of New York City who has a personal subversive plan to take revenge on the city's establishment that nearly cost him his life when the Trees first touched down, and secondly, the sole survivor of the Norway science expedition from the first volume is tasked by the British government to follow up on leads that the mysterious black flowers could be appearing at another Tree landing site.

The third volume Three Fates focuses on Klara Voranova, a police sergeant in the small Russian town of Toska. A murdered body found at the base of a Tree sets off an investigation into the forces and corruption that control the isolated town. At the same time, a ghost from Klara's past gives some clues to the purpose of the Trees.

== Reception ==
The series has been positively reviewed.

== Adaptation ==
In 2016, Tom Hardy and NBCUniversal announced a television series adaptation of Trees to be in early development.

== Collected editions ==
Trade paperbacks
Title	Material collected	Publication date	ISBN
Trees - Volume One	Trees #1–8	Feb 11, 2015	978-1632152701
Trees - Volume Two	Trees #9–14	Oct 5, 2016	978-1534301306
Trees - Volume Three	Trees Three Fates #1–5	Mar 24, 2020	978-1534315099
