= Anna Mercury =

Comic book series

- The cover to Anna Mercury #1, art by Facundo Percio.

Publication information
- Publisher: Avatar Press
- Format: Limited series
- Genre: Science fiction
- Publication date: March 2008 – December 2009
- No. of issues: 10 (5 + 5)
- Main character: Anna Mercury

Creative team
- Created by: Warren Ellis
- Written by: Warren Ellis
- Artist: Facundo Percio
- Colorist(s): Greg Waller; Digikore Studios; Paul Duffield
- Editor: William A. Christensen

Collected editions
- The Cutter: ISBN 1-59291-067-X

Anna Mercury is an American creator-owned comic book series created by writer Warren Ellis and artist Facundo Percio. Two five-issue series featuring the character have been published by Avatar Press.

== Creation and publication history ==
Ellis compared the character to a mix of Daredevil, Lara Croft and a character from Crouching Tiger, Hidden Dragon, also noting the influence of science fiction pulp magazines and the Lensman series.

The writer had first worked with Percio on Ellis' webcomic FreakAngels, noting that he loved the fusion of European-style illustration with Anglo-American comics. Anna Mercury was the first of a planned series of limited series for Avatar, a format Ellis felt was "the future".

The character debuted in April 2008 in a five-part limited series. A second five-part series, Anna Mercury 2, followed in 2009, but only three of the issues were published. In 2012, Ellis said that the conclusion - reworked as a double-length one-shot - was partly complete. As of 2024 no more information about the series has been released.

== Synopsis ==
Anna Mercury is a vinyl-clad, red-headed hero who travels between divergent worlds, fighting to keep advanced weaponry from being used by more primitive worlds. Among these are the city of New Ataraxia, where she is often considered an urban myth.

On Earth, in the modern day United Kingdom, Anna Mercury is actually Anna Louise Britton, an agent of the government, tasked with missions in the nine divergent worlds adjacent to our own. Anna's travels through the space between worlds charges her equipment that lets her defy gravity, move through solid objects, and perform other feats, though the energy is limited and must be monitored closely.

== Collected editions ==
Title	ISBN	Release date	Issues
Anna Mercury - The Cutter	9781592910663	March 2009	Anna Mercury #1-5

== Reception ==
The first issue of Anna Mercury was chosen for Comics Bulletin's "Sunday Slugfest", and all three reviewers gave the issue four 'bullets' out of five. Rich Johnston was positive about the first issue of Anna Mercury 2 in a review for Bleeding Cool: "It's big, it's bold and it's brash but it also has the depth and background and even occasional tenderness of the likes of Planetary".
