= City of Silence =

2000 comic book limited series

- Cover of City of Silence #1.

Publication information
- Publisher: Image Comics
- Schedule: Monthly
- Format: Limited series
- Publication date: May – July 2000
- No. of issues: 3

Creative team
- Created by: Warren Ellis; Gary Erskine
- Written by: Warren Ellis
- Artist: Gary Erskine
- Letterer: Annie Parkhouse
- Colorist(s): D'Israeli; Laura DePuy
- Editor: Mike Heisler

Collected editions
- City of Silence: ISBN 1-58240-367-8

City of Silence is a three-issue comic book limited series written by Warren Ellis and drawn by Gary Erskine.

== Publication history ==
The original title was going to be Silencers, to be published by Epic Comics in the mid-1990s, but Epic folded and it was not published until 2000 when it finally saw print as City of Silence, published by Image Comics.

== Collected editions ==
The series has been collected into a trade paperback:

- City of Silence (104 pages, July 2004, Image Comics, ISBN 1-58240-367-8)
