= Chris Weston =

British comics artist (born 1969)

- Born: January 1969 (age 57) Rinteln, West Germany
- Areas: Writer, Penciller, Inker, Colourist
- Notable works: Indigo Prime; The Filth; Ministry of Space

Chris Weston (born 1969) is a British comics artist who has worked both in the US and UK comics industries.

== Biography ==
Weston was born in January 1969 in Rinteln, Germany, and lived in various countries as a child. His career began when he was apprenticed for a year to work with Don Lawrence, by the end of which he had secured paid work on the British strip Judge Dredd.

He worked with writer John Smith on the ten-part Indigo Prime story "Killing Time", in which characters battled Jack the Ripper aboard a time travelling train.

Weston's work in America began with on Swamp Thing during Mark Millar's time as scriptwriter. He has since gone on to be published in The Invisibles, Starman, JSA, Lucifer, and The Authority.

He has also worked on The Filth and Ministry of Space. The former a creator-owned written by Grant Morrison, the latter a "what if?" limited series written by Warren Ellis which saw Britain winning the Space Race.

Most recently he has provided the art for Fantastic Four: First Family.

In 2008 Weston illustrated The Twelve, a twelve-issue limited series written by J. Michael Straczynski. The series involves a team formed from Timely Comics characters including The Witness, The Black Widow and Elektro.

Since 2005 Weston has written a number of stories that he has also drawn, including a number of one-offs for 2000 AD and The Twelve: Spearhead a prequel one-shot.

== Bibliography ==
Interior comic work includes:

- 2000 AD (anthology, Fleetway/Rebellion):
  - Judge Dredd:
    - "A Night at the Circus" (with John Wagner, in #596, 1988)
    - "Worms" (with Alan Grant, in #598, 1988)
    - "Accident Prone" (with Alan Grant, in #602, 1988)
    - "Tyger, Tyger..." (with Alan Grant, in #607, 1988)
    - "Crazy Barry, Little Mo" (with John Wagner, in #615-618, 1989)
    - "The (Great) Little U-Front Disaster" (with John Wagner, in #641, 1989)
    - "The Vidders" (with Garth Ennis, in #749, 1991)
    - "To Thing with Love" (with John Wagner, in #956, 1995)
    - "Rest Stop" (with Gordon Rennie, in #1194, 2000)
    - "The Death of Dan-E Cannon" (script and art, in #1800, 2012)
    - "The Heart is a Lonely Klegg Hunter" (with Rob Williams, in #1888-1889, 2014)
    - "Boxing Day" (with Rob Williams, in #2011, 2016)
    - "The Fields" (with Rob Williams, in #2035-2036, 2017)
    - "Fit for Purpose" (with Rob Williams, in #2073-2074, 2018)
    - "Elevator Pitch" (with Rob Williams, in #2088-2089, 2018)
    - "Unearthed" (co-writer with Rob Williams, drawn by Patrick Goddard, in #2124-2125, 2019)
    - "Cadet Dredd vs. Grudzilla" (script and art, in #2130, 2019)
    - "Control" (with Rob Williams, in #2141-2145, 2019)
  - Tharg's Future Shocks:
    - "Amanda" (with Jim Campbell, in #623, 1989)
    - "The God Fish" (with Mike Collins, in #636, 1989)
    - "House of the Future" (with Chris Gormley, in #637, 1989)
    - "Tharg's Terror Tales: Counts as One Choice" (script and art, in #1645, 2009)
    - "Whatever Happened to the Green Pedestrian Palm?" (script and art, in Prog 2010, 2009)
  - Inside Moves (with John Smith, in #631, 1989)
  - Rogue Trooper:
    - "The Hit Conclusion" (with Steve Dillon, in Winter Special '89, 1989)
    - "Decoys" (with Michael Fleisher, in Rogue Trooper Annual '91, 1990)
    - "Enfleshings" (with John Smith, in Yearbook '93, 1992)
    - "Shock Tactics" (with John Smith, in Sci-Fi Special '93, 1993)
    - "Scavenger of Souls" (with Michael Fleisher, in #873-880, 1994)
    - "G.I. Blues" (with Mark Millar, in #901-903, 1994)
    - "Hill 392" (with Steve White, in Poster Prog #4, 1994)
  - Indigo Prime (with John Smith, in #678, 680-682, Winter Special '90 and 735-744, 1989–1991)
  - Nemesis the Warlock: "Bride of the Warlock" (with Pat Mills, in Winter Special '92, 1992)
  - Robo-Hunter: "Something for the Weekend, Sir?" (with John Smith, in Sci-Fi Special '92, 1992)
  - Tales of MC-1: "Animal House" (with John Smith, in Sci-Fi Special '92, 1992)
  - Canon Fodder:
    - "Canon Fodder" (with Mark Millar, in #861-867, 1993)
    - "Dark Matter" (with Kek-W, in #980-987, 1996)
  - Vector 13: "Case One: Side Step" (with Dan Abnett, in #1062, 1997)
  - Nikolai Dante: "Russia's Greatest Love Machine, Part 1" (with Robbie Morrison, in #1066, 1997)
  - Downlode Tales: "City on Fire" (with Dan Abnett, in #1155-1160, 1999)
  - Pulp Sci-Fi: "Feast of Skin" (with John Smith, in #1163, 1999)
  - Sláine: "The Bogatyr" (with Pat Mills, in #2111, 2018)
  - Strontium Dog: "Bleeding Dogs Lie" (with Matt Smith, in Villains Takeover Special!, 2019)
- Swamp Thing vol. 2 #153: "Twilight of the Gods" (with Mark Millar, Vertigo, 1995)
- The Invisibles (with Grant Morrison, Vertigo):
  - "Season of Ghouls" (in vol. 1 #10, 1995)
  - "Mad Dogs and Englishmen" (with Phil Jimenez, in vol. 2 #9, 1998)
  - "Kissing Mister Quimper" (in vol. 2 #14-17 and 19-22, 1998–1999)
  - "Goodbye Rag" (among other artists, in vol. 3 #3, 2000)
- Time Breakers #1-5 (with Rachel Pollack, Helix, 1997)
- The Dreaming #25: "My Year as a Man" (with Peter Hogan, Vertigo, 1998)
- Star-Spangled Comics: "...A Terrifying Hour!" (with Geoff Johns, one-shot, DC Comics, 1999)
- Starman vol. 2 #55 (with David Goyer, James Robinson, Peter Snejbjerg and John McCrea, DC Comics, 1999)
- Stars and S.T.R.I.P.E. #0: "A Chilly Day in Opal" (with Geoff Johns, James Robinson and Lee Moder, 1999)
- JSA Secret Files #1: "History 101" (with Ron Marz, co-feature, DC Comics, 1999)
- Lucifer #1-3: "A Six-Card Spread" (with Mike Carey, Vertigo, 2000)
- The Authority #18-19: "Earth Inferno" (with Mark Millar, Wildstorm, 2000)
- Flinch #15: "Watchful" (with Lucius Shepard, anthology, Vertigo, 2000)
- Ministry of Space #1-3 (with Warren Ellis, Image, 2001–2004)
- Enemy Ace: War in Heaven #1 (of 2) (with Garth Ennis, DC Comics, 2001)
- War Story: Johann's Tiger (with Garth Ennis, one-shot, Vertigo, 2001)
- The Filth #1-13 (with Grant Morrison, Vertigo, 2002–2003)
- Judge Dredd Megazine (anthology, Rebellion):
  - Judge Dredd:
    - "Wharever Happened to Tweak?" (with Pat Mills, in #214, 2004)
    - "Six" (with John Wagner, in #221-222, 2004)
- Tom Strong's Terrific Tales #11-12: "Jonni Future" (with Steve Moore, anthology, America's Best Comics, 2004)
- Event Horizon Volume 1: "Heinrich Manoeuvre's H.E.A.D Trip!" (script and art, anthology graphic novel, Mam Tor, 2005)
- Batman: Legends of the Dark Knight #197-199: "Blaze of Glory" (with Will Pfeifer, DC Comics, 2006)
- Fantastic Four: First Family #1-6 (with Joe Casey, Marvel, 2006)
- American Splendor (with Harvey Pekar, anthology, Vertigo):
  - "Comic Convention Comic" (in vol. 2 #2, 2006)
  - "Fall" (in vol. 3 #1, 2008)
- The Twelve (Marvel):
  - The Twelve #1-12 (with J. Michael Straczynski, 2008–2012)
  - The Twelve: Spearhead (script and art, one-shot, 2010)
- Four Feet from a Rat #1-4: "The Little Guy" (with Mother, anthology, Mam Tor, 2008)
- Rocketeer Adventures #2: "It Ain't the Fall That Kills Ya..." (with Mark Waid, anthology, IDW Publishing, 2011)
- Adventures of Superman vol. 2 #12: "Savior" (with Rob Williams, digital, DC Comics, 2013)
- Batman: Black and White vol. 2 #5: "I Killed the Bat!" (with Blair Butler, anthology, DC Comics, 2014)
- Marvel Comics #1000: "The Guild of Strange Science" (with Al Ewing, anthology, Marvel, 2019)

=== Covers only ===
- Zzap!64 #70, 72 (Newsfield Publications, 1991)
- The Best of 2000 AD #91 (Fleetway, 1993)
- 2000 AD #925, 1383, 1650, 1760, 1771, 1776, 1782, 1837, 2065, 2110 (Fleetway/Rebellion, 1995–2018)
- Judge Dredd Megazine #215, 231, 325, 400 (Rebellion, 2004–2018)
- Elephantmen #5 (Image, 2007)
- The Twelve #0 (Marvel, 2008)
- The Phantom Patrol tpb (Book Palace, 2009)
- Superman: Last Stand of New Krypton #3 (DC Comics, 2010)
- Judge Dredd: Anderson, PSI-Division #1 (IDW Publishing, 2014)
- Big Trouble in Little China #1 (Boom! Studios, 2014)
- Chrononauts #1 (Image, 2015)
- Dan Dare vol. 2 #1-4 (Titan, 2017–2018)
- The Prisoner: Uncertainty Machine #1 (Titan, 2018)
