= Warren Ellis =

English comic book writer, novelist, and screenwriter (born 1968)

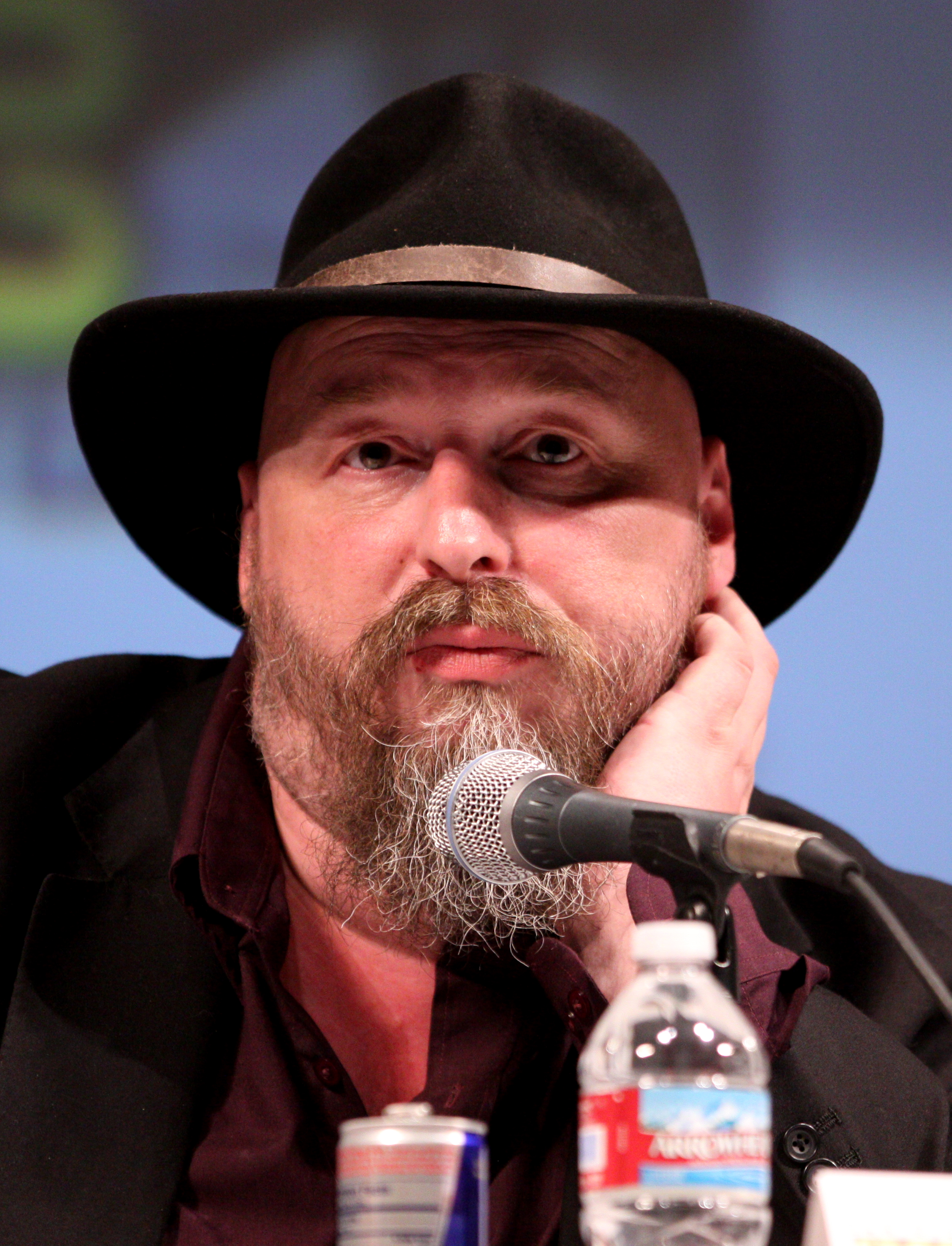
- Ellis at the 2010 San Diego Comic-Con
- Born: Warren Girard Ellis; 16 February 1968 (age 58) Rochford, Essex, England
- Area: Writer
- Notable works: Transmetropolitan; The Authority; Planetary; Hellblazer; Global Frequency; Red; Fell; Iron Man: Extremis; Nextwave; Thunderbolts; FreakAngels; Supergod; Moon Knight; Trees; Injection; James Bond
- Awards: Eagle Award

Warren Girard Ellis (born 16 February 1968) is an English comic book writer, novelist, and screenwriter. He is best known as the co-creator of several original comics series, including Transmetropolitan (1997–2002), Global Frequency (2002–2004) and Red (2003–2004), which was adapted into the feature films Red (2010) and Red 2 (2013). Ellis is the author of the novels Crooked Little Vein (2007) and Gun Machine (2013) and the novella Normal (2016).

A prolific comic book writer, Ellis has written several Marvel series, including Astonishing X-Men, Thunderbolts, Moon Knight and the "Extremis" story arc of Iron Man, which was the basis for the Marvel Cinematic Universe film Iron Man 3 (2013). Ellis created The Authority and Planetary for WildStorm, and wrote a run of Hellblazer for Vertigo and James Bond for Dynamite Entertainment. Ellis wrote the video games Hostile Waters (2001), Cold Winter (2005), and Dead Space (2008). He also wrote the animated TV movie G.I. Joe: Resolute (2009), wrote the English version of Marvel Anime (2010–2011), and served as the head writer on Netflix series Castlevania (2017–2021).

Ellis is well known for sociocultural commentary, both through his online presence and through his writing, which covers transhumanist (most notably nanotechnology, cryonics, mind transfer and human enhancement) and folkloric themes, often in combination with each other. He is a humanist and former patron of Humanists UK, a charity focused on promoting humanism and advancing secularism. He is a resident of Southend-on-Sea, England.

== Early life ==
Ellis was born in Essex in February 1968. He has stated that the televised broadcast of the Moon landing is his earliest coherent memory. He was a student at the South East Essex Sixth Form College, commonly known as SEEVIC. He contributed comic work to the college magazine Spike along with Richard Easter, who also later followed a career in writing.

Before starting his career as a writer, he worked in a book and stationery store, notably the Cartoon Shop in Southend, a pub, in bankruptcy, in a record shop, and lifted compost bags.

== Career ==
=== Early career ===
Ellis's writing career started in the British roleplaying magazine 'Adventurer' for which he wrote the 1920s Cthulhu mythos strip 'Whiplash' throughout 1986. This was followed by a six-page short story published in 1990 in independent magazine Deadline. Other early works include a Judge Dredd short and a Doctor Who one-pager. His first ongoing work, Lazarus Churchyard with D'Israeli, appeared in Blast!, a short-lived British magazine.

By 1994, Ellis had begun working for Marvel Comics, where he took over the series Hellstorm: Prince of Lies with issue number 12, which he wrote until its cancellation after issue number 21. Other notable early Marvel work includes writing for the Marvel 2099 imprint, most notably in a storyline in which a futuristic Doctor Doom took over the United States, and a run on Excalibur, a superhero series set in Britain. He also wrote a four-issue arc of Thor called "Worldengine", in which he dramatically revamped both the character and book (though the changes lasted only as long as Ellis's run), and wrote Wolverine with artist Leinil Francis Yu.

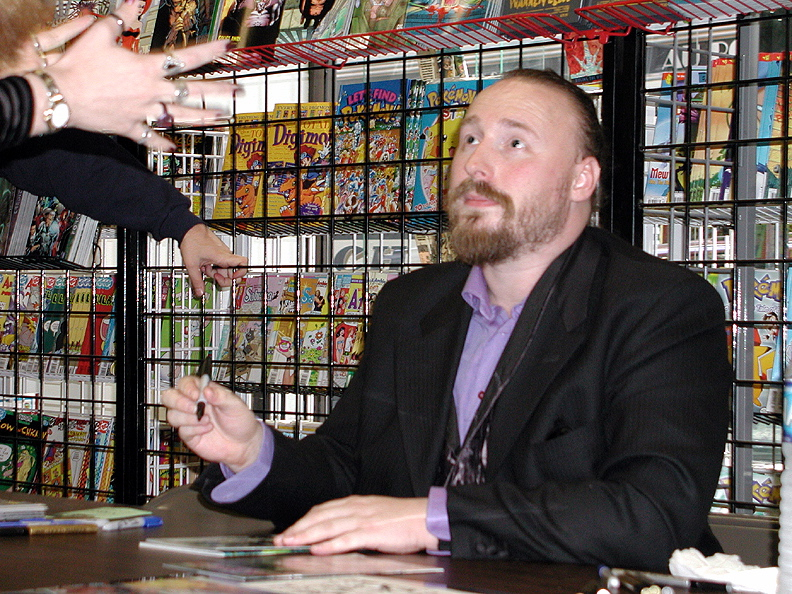
Warren Ellis signing autographs

=== The Authority, Transmetropolitan and critical acclaim ===
Ellis then started working for DC Comics, Caliber Comics and Image Comics' Wildstorm studio, where he wrote the Gen^{13} spin-off DV8 and took over Stormwatch, a previously action-oriented team book, to which he gave a more idea- and character-driven flavor. He wrote issues 37–50 with artist Tom Raney, and the 11 issues of volume two with artists Oscar Jimenez and Bryan Hitch. Hitch and he followed that with the Stormwatch spin-off The Authority, a cinematic super-action series for which Ellis coined the term "widescreen comics".

In 1997, Ellis started Transmetropolitan, a creator-owned series about an acerbic "gonzo" journalist in a dystopian future America, co-created with artist Darick Robertson and published by DC's Helix imprint. When Helix was discontinued the following year, Transmetropolitan was shifted to the Vertigo imprint, and remained one of the most successful nonsuperhero comics DC was then publishing. Transmetropolitan ran for 60 issues (plus a few specials), ending in 2002, and the entire run was later collected in a series of trade paperbacks. It remains Ellis's largest work to date.

Planetary, another Wildstorm series by Ellis and John Cassaday, launched in 1999, as did Ellis's short run on the DC/Vertigo series Hellblazer. He left that series when DC announced, following the Columbine High School massacre, that it would not publish "Shoot", a Hellblazer story about school shootings, although the story had been written and illustrated prior to the Columbine massacre. Planetary concluded in October 2009 with issue 27.

=== Return to superhero titles ===
Ellis returned to Marvel Comics as part of the company's "Revolution" event, to head the "Counter-X" line of titles. This project was intended to revitalise the X-Men spin-off books Generation X, X-Man, and X-Force, but it was not successful and Ellis stayed away from mainstream superhero comics for a time.

In 2002, Ellis started Global Frequency, a 12-issue limited series for Wildstorm, and continued to produce work for various publishers, including DC, Avatar Press, AiT/Planet Lar, Cliffhanger and Homage Comics.

In 2004, Ellis came back to mainstream superhero comics. He took over Ultimate Fantastic Four and Iron Man for Marvel under a temporary exclusive work for hire contract.

Toward the end of 2004, Ellis released the "Apparat Singles Group", which he described as "An imaginary line of comics singles. Four imaginary first issues of imaginary series from an imaginary line of comics, even". The Apparat titles were published by Avatar, but carried only the Apparat logo on their covers.

In 2006, Ellis worked for DC on Jack Cross, which was not well received and was subsequently cancelled. For Marvel, he worked on Nextwave, a 12-issue limited series. He also worked on the Ultimate Galactus trilogy. Ellis also took over the Thunderbolts monthly title, which deals with the aftermath of the Marvel Civil War crossover.

In honour of the 20th anniversary of Marvel's New Universe in 2006, Ellis and illustrator Salvador Larroca created a new series that reimagines the New Universe under the title newuniversal. The first issue was released on 6 December 2006.

Ellis continued to work on several projects for different publishers, including Desolation Jones (for DC/Wildstorm) and Blackgas and Black Summer (for Avatar Press). Ellis also wrote an episode of Justice League Unlimited entitled "Dark Heart".

=== 2007–2012 ===
Ellis's first prose novel, Crooked Little Vein, was published in mid-2007 by William Morrow (an imprint of HarperCollins).

Ellis has described himself as "a notorious pain in the arse for getting involved in book design". According to a comment made in the first issue of Fell, he has more trade paperbacks in print than anyone else in the American comic industry.

On 29 July 2007, Ellis announced two new projects for Avatar Press: FreakAngels, a free long-form webcomic illustrated by Paul Duffield, and Ignition City, a five-issue miniseries. He also has five other current series with Avatar: Anna Mercury, No Hero, along with two long series Doktor Sleepless and Gravel.

The first quarter of 2009 had the release of G.I. Joe: Resolute, a series of webisodes written by Warren Ellis and later released on DVD in December.

He worked with D'Israeli again in 2010–2011 for a one-off comic, SVK, to be published by BERG, a London consultancy firm. It uses a UV torch to reveal the thoughts of the characters in the story.

In 2010, a documentary film on Ellis, Warren Ellis: Captured Ghosts, was announced for 2011 completion. Its co-producer Sequart Organization also plans on publishing, in 2011, three books studying Ellis's work: on Planetary, Transmetropolitan and Ellis's overall career. Sequart has dubbed this push "The Year of Ellis."

=== 2013–2015: Gun Machine, subsequent Marvel work and return to Image ===
Ellis's second novel, hardboiled detective thriller Gun Machine, was released on 3 January 2013 by Mulholland Books. The novel follows a Manhattan detective investigating a murder, which expands into the hunt of a serial killer. Gun Machine hit The New York Times Best Sellers list and received mostly positive reviews. In June 2013, Ellis announced on his website that he would be ending his relationship with Mulholland Books due to "continuing issues" and cancelling the release of his short story "Dead Pig Collector". In July 2013, "Dead Pig Collector" was picked up by Farrar, Straus and Giroux and published as a digital original.

In March 2014, Ellis relaunched Moon Knight for Marvel, with art by Declan Shalvey and colors by Jordie Bellaire. The series received critical acclaim and helped establish Moon Knight as a major character in the Marvel Universe. Ellis ended his run after six issues, after which the series was taken on by writer Brian Wood. Trees, a new creator-owned comics collaboration between Ellis and artist Jason Howard, debuted in May 2014 through Image Comics. The science fiction series explores a world in which aliens have invaded Earth, but completely ignored humans. The first story arc concluded in January 2015, and was followed by a second volume, Trees: Two Forests, which ended its run in August 2016. A third volume is planned.

Ellis joined main writer Kelly Sue DeConnick to co-write two issues of her Captain Marvel series in early 2015. In May 2015, Ellis reteamed with his Moon Knight collaborators Shalvey and Bellaire to publish Injection with Image Comics. The creator-owned science-fiction series follows the members of a think tank given the task of improving the future, who deal with mistakes made after trying to prevent human innovation from dying off. Three volumes of Injection have been released.

Ellis launched a new ongoing comics series featuring James Bond in November 2015, published by Dynamite Entertainment in partnership with Ian Fleming Publications and illustrated by Jason Masters. James Bond depicts the original character from the Ian Fleming novels, as opposed to the one in the films, but is set in present day. The first story arc, "Vargr", was followed in June 2016 with a second arc titled "Eidolon". Ellis stepped down from the series after 12 issues in December 2016 and was succeeded as writer by Benjamin Percy. As part of Marvel's All-New All-Different relaunch, Ellis wrote the series Karnak, following the eponymous Inhuman character. The series debuted in October 2015 with art by Gerardo Zaffino to positive reviews. Karnak suffered several delays which resulted in Zaffino being replaced by Roland Boschi. The series ended its six-issue run in February 2017.

=== 2016–present: Normal and WildStorm revival ===
Normal, Ellis's new novella, was serialized as four digital installments beginning in July 2016. It was published as a single volume by Farrar, Straus and Giroux in November 2016. The near-future thriller follows the residents of an asylum for futurists as they investigate a disappearance. The novella received a mostly positive reception, with reviewers praising its plot, humor and commentary on the future.

In October 2016, Ellis launched Shipwreck, a new six-issue comics miniseries with artist Phil Hester, published by AfterShock Comics. The series follows the survivor of a shipwreck trying to find out what happened after he washes up on another world. Though Ellis has left open the possibility of expanding the book past six issues, he said he is focused finishing the story as planned first.

Despite rarely returning to his early work, in October 2016, DC Comics announced a relaunch of the WildStorm publishing line as a new imprint curated by Ellis. Taking a similar approach to Gerard Way's Young Animal imprint, DC asked Ellis to write a main series, titled The Wild Storm, and curating others set in the same universe. The series begins a complete reboot of the WildStorm Universe, with Ellis saying his goal is for the imprint to be new reader-friendly. The Wild Storm debuted in February 2017 with art by John Davis-Hunt. In his newsletter Orbital Operations, Ellis stated that he has a two-year plan for the series. Three more WildStorm series are expected to follow.

In 2017, Netflix launched a Castlevania animated television series adaptation, written and produced by Ellis. Ellis had been previously hired to write a screenplay for Castlevania: Dracula's Curse, an animated film based on Castlevania III: Dracula's Curse. The first season of the Castlevania TV series was released in 2017, and seasons 2 through 4 were released during the period of 2018 to 2021. Executive producer Adi Shankar confirmed that Ellis would be writing every episode.

=== Planned projects ===
In 2012, Ellis announced he would publish a nonfiction book, tentatively titled Spirit Tracks, with Farrar, Straus, and Giroux. The book is "about the future of the city, the ghosts that haunt it and the science-fiction condition we live in." It is based on a talk Ellis gave in Berlin at a conference titled "Cognitive Cities", which was based on a series of posts on his website. At Image Expo 2015, Heartless, a new creator-owned comic book with Ellis's Supreme: Blue Rose collaborator Tula Lotay, was announced. As of May 2024, Heartless has yet to be released, though Ellis has commented in 2016 that Lotay and he are working on it at their "own pace".

Finality, a new webcomic written by Ellis and illustrated by Colleen Doran, was announced in September 2016. Set to be published by Webtoon in 2017, the 26-issue weekly series follows a middle-aged female detective working a murder mystery.

In 2020, anime streaming platform Crunchyroll announced that it was adapting the webcomic FreakAngels as one of the first Crunchyroll Originals anime TV series.

== Unrealised projects ==
In 2006, Ellis was hired to develop a science-fiction television series for AMC titled Dead Channel, but the project was put on hiatus. The series followed a television network executive who discovers the existence of aliens and decides to turn the discovery into a reality show. Listener, a near-future science fiction novel, was planned as Ellis's next book after Crooked Little Vein. The novel has since been lost and cancelled.

Wastelanders, a web-based "end-of-the-world" collaboration with director Joss Whedon, was postponed due to Whedon's work on The Avengers. Ellis and British producer Vivek Tiwary developed an adventure thriller television miniseries title Ascension, with Idris Elba in talks to star, though nothing has come of the project.

== Adaptations and nonfiction ==
=== Film and television adaptations ===
Adaptations of Ellis's works have frequently been planned, to limited success. Ellis and Cully Hamner's miniseries, Red, has been loosely adapted as two films: Red (2010) and Red 2 (2013), written by Jon Hoeber and Erich Hoeber, produced by Lorenzo di Bonaventura and starring Bruce Willis, Morgan Freeman and Helen Mirren. The sequel was simply inspired by the comics as no source material exists outside the original miniseries. The Hoebers were commissioned to write a third installment in 2013, though no further developments have occurred since. A television series based on the Red film franchise, produced by di Bonaventura and written the Hoeber brothers, was announced as in development in 2015. The Iron Man "Extremis" story arc written by Ellis was used as the primary influence on the plot of the Marvel Cinematic Universe film Iron Man 3, directed by Shane Black. Elements of "Extremis" were also used in the first Iron Man film.

Global Frequency has been at various stages of adaptation since its publication. A television pilot written by John Rogers was produced in 2005, but development ended after it was leaked. Several more attempts to bring the limited series to television include writers Scott Nimerfro in 2009, and Rockne S. O'Bannon in 2014, though none have materialized. Gravel was at one point being developed with Tim Miller attached as director, with Ellis commissioned to write the first draft of the screenplay and serving as executive producer. Black Summer has also been optioned as a feature film. Ellis's comics collaboration with Chris Sprouse, Ocean, has been optioned, and Ryan Condal hired to write a screenplay. Ellis's novel Gun Machine has been set up as a television series first with writer Dario Scardapane at Fox in 2012, and later in 2014 at the now-defunct Xbox Entertainment, with a script by Brett Conrad. In 2016, it was announced that NBCUniversal had optioned the rights to Ellis and Jason Howard's Trees and would be developing it as a television series with Tom Hardy's production company.

=== Talks and speaking engagements ===
In 2013, Ellis spoke at the HowTheLightGetsIn festival in Hay. In his first talk, titled Our Hopeless Future and Other Comedy, he discussed the power of Twitter and how it can 'break' other people's websites. In the second, Thinking Differently, he explored how the internet revolution is changing people's lives and asked whether it is changing how people think. A festival regular, he has returned in subsequent years to debate the risks and rewards of artificial intelligence with physicist Stephen Hawking and collaborator Roger Penrose.

=== Nonfiction and email newsletters ===
Ellis is a contributor of nonfiction articles and columns to magazines and websites. He has been a columnist for SuicideGirls, Reuters, Vice, Wired UK, and Esquire. From 1995 to 1999, he wrote an email list titled From the Desk of, where he wrote about various subjects including the comic industry and his work. From the Desk of was collected in two print volumes by Avatar Press. When technical issues forced that list to shut down in 2001, Ellis started a new email list, Bad Signal, which was described as "anarchy in your mailbox to brighten up your day". Bad Signal was replaced in 2012, two years after its closing, by Machine Vision; Ellis ended Machine Vision alongside his relationship with his publisher Mulholland Books a year later. Since 2013, Ellis has been writing the weekly email newsletter Orbital Operations, which features work updates and thoughts on books, comics and current events. As of late 2015, Orbital Operations had 13,000 subscribers.

In 2007, Ellis launched the now-defunct message board Whitechapel as a companion to his webcomic FreakAngels, though it rapidly evolved into his internet home. He is frequently referred to as "The Boss", "Stalin", "The Love Swami" or "Internet Jesus" on these forums. Ellis maintains a blog at his personal website, thought it is rarely updated. Beginning in 2014, he wrote regularly at Morning.Computer. In 2015, Ellis published Cunning Plans, an ebook collection of talks he gave at technology and futurism conferences.

== Sexual coercion allegations ==
In June 2020, several women (including musician Meredith Yayanos, artist Zoetica Ebb, and photographer Jhayne Holmes) publicly accused Ellis of sexual coercion and manipulation, in having engaged in simultaneous relationships with several of them without the others' knowledge. The Daily Beast reported that "by 19 June, over 60 women had joined a group organized by Holmes, all of them accusing Ellis of a largely consistent pattern of behavior". The Guardian later reported that "roughly 100 women have come forward, while 33 of them have composed written statements, supported by emails and text messages, which have been seen by The Guardian". These testimonials were posted together on a website, SoManyofUs.com, in July 2020 and contain allegations of "manipulation, gaslighting, coercion, and other forms of emotional abuse" attributed to Ellis.

Ellis responded, writing that he had not considered that others would see him as having "a position of power and privilege", and adding: “I have hurt many people that I had no intention of hurting. I am culpable. I take responsibility for my mistakes. I will do better and for that, I apologize." DC Comics subsequently announced a two-page story written by Ellis would not be included in an upcoming anthology, at his request. Ellis ended his long-running email newsletter, which he had published under various titles since 1995.

In mid-July 2020, an article in The Guardian reported "Ellis responded to these accounts with self-pity and what seemed to be genuine contrition. [...] Ellis insists that the problem was relationship trouble, 'not predatory behaviour', but concedes that '[t]here is a differing of perception here, and I've been listening to it'. He said he was going to try therapy on the advice of friends". The Hollywood Reporter later reported Ellis would not be returning to Castlevania for subsequent seasons and that a planned Batman comic would no longer be moving forward.

In June 2021, a week after Ben Templesmith announced he would be collaborating with Ellis for new issues of Fell, Image Comics announced they would not be publishing the series following negative reaction from within the industry. An update on SoManyofUs.com informed that Ellis reached out to the site’s managers to say he was willing to engage in conversation or mediation. Ellis reactivated his dormant website to inform subscribers about this development.

In an update in January 2022, SoManyofUs.com reported that their members have been in a mediated dialogue with Ellis since August 2021 and that they were making progress in what was described as “a guided transformative justice process”. In February 2022, Ellis relaunched his newsletter, in which he linked to the SoManyofUs.com update and website. On January 19, 2023, SoManyOfUs.com once again updated the site, alleging that Ellis "took none of the steps we hoped he would", and also stating "we do not anticipate our involvement in any progress he might make in the future."

Announced in August 2026, Image Comics has begun working with Ellis.

== Awards ==
- 2001 Eagle Award – Favourite Comics Story (for The Authority: The Nativity)
- 2003 Wizard Magazine Best One-Shot (for Planetary/Batman: Night on Earth)
- 2004 Sidewise Award for Alternate History (for Ministry of Space)
- 2007 Eagle Award – Favourite Comics Writer
- 2007 Eagle Award – Favourite New Comicbook (for Nextwave)
- 2007 Eagle Award – Favourite Comics Story (for Nextwave #1–6)
- 2007 Eagle Award Roll of Honour
- 2010 Eagle Award – Favourite Comics Writer
- 2010 Eagle Award – Favourite Web-Based Comic (for FreakAngels)

== Filmography ==
=== Television ===
Year	Title	Credit	Notes	Ref.
2004	Justice League Unlimited	Writer	Writer (Episode: "Dark Heart")	
2007	Revisioned: Tomb Raider	Writer	Writer (Episodes: "Angel Spit: Part 2", "Angel Spit: Part 1")	
2009	G.I. Joe: Resolute	Writer	Writer (11 episodes)	
2010	Marvel Anime: Iron Man	Story	Story (12 episodes)	
2011	Marvel Anime: Wolverine	Story	Story (12 episodes)	
2011	Marvel Anime: X-Men	Story	Story (12 episodes)	
2011	Marvel Anime: Blade	Story	Story (12 episodes)	
2017–2021	Castlevania	Writer	Writer (32 episodes)	

=== Video games ===
Year	Title	Credit	Notes	Ref.
2001	Hostile Waters	Writer		
2005	Cold Winter	Writer		
2008	Dead Space	Writer	With Rick Remender and Antony Johnston	

Preceded by Scott Lobdell	Excalibur writer 1994–1996	Succeeded by Ben Raab
Preceded by Roy Thomas	Thor writer 1995–1996	Succeeded by William Messner-Loebs
Preceded by H. K. Proger	Stormwatch writer 1996–1998	Succeeded by Micah Ian Wright (Team Achilles)
Preceded by Larry Hama	Wolverine writer 1997–1998	Succeeded by Chris Claremont
Preceded by Garth Ennis	Hellblazer writer 1999	Succeeded by Brian Azzarello
Preceded by n/a	The Authority writer 1999–2000	Succeeded by Mark Millar
Preceded by Brian Michael Bendis; Mark Millar	Ultimate Fantastic Four writer 2004–2005	Succeeded by Mark Millar
Preceded by Mark Scott Ricketts	Iron Man writer 2005–2006	Succeeded by Daniel and Charles Knauf
Preceded by Fabian Nicieza	Thunderbolts writer 2007–2008	Succeeded by Christos Gage
Preceded by Joss Whedon	Astonishing X-Men writer 2008–2010	Succeeded by Daniel Way; Christos Gage
Preceded by Nick Spencer	Secret Avengers writer 2011–2012	Succeeded by Rick Remender
Preceded by Brian Michael Bendis	Moon Knight writer 2014	Succeeded by Brian Wood
