= Geoff Johns bibliography =

- Active period: 1999–present

Publishers
- DC Comics: 1999–2024
- Marvel Comics: 2002–2004
- Image Comics: 2021–Present

This is a bibliography of the comic book writer Geoff Johns, who has been writing superhero comics for over twenty years.

== DC Comics ==
Titles published by DC Comics include:

- Stargirl:
  - DCU Heroes Secret Files & Origins: "Blue Valley High Yearbook" (with Lee Moder, one-page co-feature, 1999)
  - Stars and S.T.R.I.P.E. (with Lee Moder, Chris Weston (#0) and Scott Kolins (#9–11), 1999–2000) collected as:
    - JSA Presents: Stars and S.T.R.I.P.E. Volume 1 (collects #1–8, tpb, 192 pages, 2007, ISBN 1-4012-1390-1)
    - JSA Presents: Stars and S.T.R.I.P.E. Volume 2 (collects #0 and 9–14, tpb, 192 pages, 2008, ISBN 1-4012-1631-5)
  - Impulse #61: "The Sidekick Swap" (with Eric Battle and Mariko Shindo, 2000)
  - Infinite Frontier #0 (untitled 4-page story, with Todd Nauck, anthology, 2021) collected in Infinite Frontier (hc, 352 pages, 2022, ISBN 1-77951-424-7; tpb, 2023, ISBN 1-77951-998-2)
  - Stargirl: The Lost Children (tpb, 184 pages, 2023, ISBN 1-77951-846-3) collects:
    - Stargirl Spring Break Special (with Todd Nauck and Bryan Hitch, 2021)
    - Stargirl: The Lost Children #1–6 (with Todd Nauck, 2023)
- Justice Society of America:
  - Star Spangled Comics: "...A Terrifying Hour!" (with Chris Weston, one-shot, 1999) collected in The Justice Society Returns (tpb, 256 pages, 2003, ISBN 1-4012-0090-7)
  - JSA (with the first half of the run — issues #6–25 and 32–51 — co-written by Johns and David S. Goyer, and the rest written by Johns solo; art by Marcos Martín (#6), Stephen Sadowski, Aldrin Aw (#11–12, 21, Annual), Steve Yeowell (#18), Rags Morales (#22, 26–27), Peter Snejbjerg (#29, 31–32), Keith Giffen (#33), Leonard Kirk, Patrick Gleason (#39), Sal Velluto (#46), Don Kramer, Sean Phillips (#59), Tom Mandrake (#60–62), Jerry Ordway (#63–64), Dave Gibbons (#67), David López (#76), Jim Fern (#77) and Dale Eaglesham (#81), 2000–2006) collected as:
    - JSA by Geoff Johns Book One (includes #6–15, tpb, 392 pages, 2017, ISBN 1-4012-7490-0)
    - JSA by Geoff Johns Book Two (collects #16–25, tpb, 440 pages, 2018, ISBN 1-4012-8154-0)
      - Includes the "Sorrow Even More" short story (co-written by Johns and David S. Goyer, art by Phil Winslade) from Secret Origins of Super-Villains 80-Page Giant (anthology one-shot, 1999)
      - Includes "The Day Before..." short story (co-written by Johns and David S. Goyer, art by Stephen Sadowski) from JLA/JSA Secret Files & Origins (one-shot, 2003)
      - Includes the JLA/JSA: Virtue and Vice graphic novel (co-written by Johns and David S. Goyer, art by Carlos Pacheco, 96 pages, 2002, ISBN 1-56389-937-X)
      - Includes the JSA: Our Worlds at War one-shot (written by Johns, art by Javier Saltares, 2001)
    - JSA by Geoff Johns Book Three (collects #26–31 and Annual, tpb, 480 pages, 2019, ISBN 1-4012-9220-8)
      - Includes the "Breaking Storms" (co-written by Johns and David S. Goyer, art by Javier Saltares) and "Upping the Ante" (written by Johns, art by Derec Aucoin) short stories from JSA Secret Files & Origins #2 (2001)
      - Includes the 8-issue spin-off limited series JSA: All-Stars (co-written by Johns and David S. Goyer, art by Sal Velluto, Phil Winslade, Barry Kitson, Mike McKone, Adam DeKraker, Stephen Sadowski and Dave Ross, 2003–2004)
    - JSA by Geoff Johns Book Four (collects #32–45, tpb, 352 pages, 2020, ISBN 1-77950-561-2)
    - JSA by Geoff Johns Book Five (collects #46–58 and Hawkman vol. 4 #23–25, tpb, 416 pages, 2023, ISBN 1-77952-164-2)
    - JSA: Lost (collects #59–67, tpb, 208 pages, 2005, ISBN 1-4012-0722-7)
    - JSA: Black Vengeance (collects #68–75, tpb, 208 pages, 2006, ISBN 1-4012-0966-1)
    - JSA: Mixed Signals (includes #76–77 and 81, tpb, 144 pages, 2006, ISBN 1-4012-0967-X)
    - JSA Omnibus Volume 1 (includes #6–25, JLA/JSA Secret Files & Origins, JLA/JSA: Virtue and Vice and JSA: Our Worlds at War, hc, 1,224 pages, 2014, ISBN 1-4012-4761-X)
    - JSA Omnibus Volume 2 (collects #26–75, Annual, Hawkman vol. 4 #23–25 and JSA Secret Files & Origins #2, hc, 1,408 pages, 2014, ISBN 1-4012-5138-2)
    - JSA Omnibus Volume 3 (includes #76–77 and 81, hc, 1,248 pages, 2015, ISBN 1-4012-5530-2)
  - JSA: Classified #1–4: "Power Trip" (with Amanda Conner, 2005) collected as Power Girl (tpb, 176 pages, 2006, ISBN 1-4012-0968-8)
  - Justice Society of America vol. 3 (with Dale Eaglesham, Fernando Pasarin and Jerry Ordway; issues #10–22 are co-written by Johns and Alex Ross, 2007–2009) collected as:
    - The Next Age (collects #1–4, hc, 144 pages, 2007, ISBN 1-4012-1444-4; tpb, 2008, ISBN 1-4012-1585-8)
    - Justice League of America: The Lightning Saga (includes #5–6, hc, 224 pages, 2008, ISBN 1-4012-1652-8; tpb, 2009, ISBN 1-4012-1869-5)
    - Thy Kingdom Come Volume 1 (collects #7–12, hc, 160 pages, 2008, ISBN 1-4012-1690-0; tpb, 2009, ISBN 1-4012-1741-9)
    - Thy Kingdom Come Volume 2 (collects #13–18 and Annual, hc, 192 pages, 2008, ISBN 1-4012-1914-4; tpb, 2009, ISBN 1-4012-1946-2)
    - Thy Kingdom Come Volume 3 (collects #19–22, hc, 224 pages, 2009, ISBN 1-4012-2166-1; tpb, 2010, ISBN 1-4012-2167-X)
      - Includes the JSA Kingdom Come Special: The Kingdom (co-written by Johns and Alex Ross, art by Fernando Pasarin, 2009)
      - Includes the "Secret Origin of Starman" (art by Scott Kolins) short story from JSA Kingdom Come Special: Magog (2009)
    - Black Adam and Isis (collects #23–26, hc, 160 pages, 2009, ISBN 1-4012-2530-6; tpb, 2010, ISBN 1-4012-2531-4)
    - JSA Omnibus Volume 3 (collects #1–26, Annual and JSA Kingdom Come Specials, hc, 1,248 pages, 2015, ISBN 1-4012-5530-2)
  - Justice Society of America vol. 4 #1–12 (with Mikel Janín, 2022–2024)
- Green Lantern:
  - Green Lantern Secret Files & Origins #2: "Lost Pages: Haunting" (with Shawn Martinbrough, co-feature, 1999)
  - Day of Judgment (tpb, 160 pages, 2013, ISBN 1-4012-3795-9) includes:
    - Day of Judgment #1–5 (with Matthew Dow Smith and Christopher Jones (#3–5), 1999)
    - Day of Judgment Secret Files & Origins: "Faust's Epilogue" (with Jason Orfalas, co-feature, 1999)
  - Green Lantern: Rebirth #1–6 (with Ethan Van Sciver, 2004–2005) collected as Green Lantern: Rebirth (hc, 176 pages, 2005, ISBN 1-4012-0710-3; tpb, 2007, ISBN 1-4012-0465-1)
  - Green Lantern Secret Files & Origins 2005: "Flight" (with Darwyn Cooke) and "The Day Before" (with Ethan Van Sciver) (one-shot, 2005)
  - Green Lantern (with Ethan Van Sciver, Carlos Pacheco, Simone Bianchi (vol. 4 #6), Ivan Reis, Daniel Acuña (vol. 4 #18–20), Dave Gibbons (co-features in vol. 4 #18–20), Mike McKone (vol. 4 #26–28), Philip Tan (vol. 4 #39–42), Rafael Albuquerque (co-feature in vol. 4 #40), Doug Mahnke, Ed Benes (vol. 4 #49 and 63), Jerry Ordway (co-feature in vol. 4 #49), Shawn Davis (co-feature in vol. 4 #55), Ardian Syaf (vol. 4 #63 and vol. 5 #18–19), Mike Choi (vol. 5 #6), Renato Guedes with Jim Calafiore (vol. 5 #12) and Szymon Kudranski (vol. 5 #18–19), 2005–2013) collected as:
    - Green Lantern by Geoff Johns Book One (collects Rebirth #1–6 and vol. 4 #1–3, the "Flight" and "The Day Before" stories from Secret Files & Origins 2005 and Recharge #1–5, tpb, 400 pages, 2019, ISBN 1-4012-8828-6)
    - Green Lantern by Geoff Johns Book Two (collects vol. 4 #4–20, tpb, 400 pages, 2019, ISBN 1-4012-9426-X)
    - Green Lantern by Geoff Johns Book Three (collects vol. 4 #21–25, co-features from #18–20, Sinestro Corps Special and Tales of the Sinestro Corps: Superman-Prime, tpb, 400 pages, 2020, ISBN 1-4012-9979-2)
    - Green Lantern by Geoff Johns Book Four (collects vol. 4 #26–38 and Final Crisis: Rage of the Red Lanterns, tpb, 352 pages, 2020, ISBN 1-77950-602-3)
    - Green Lantern: Agent Orange (collects vol. 4 #39–42, hc, 128 pages, 2009, ISBN 1-4012-2421-0; tpb, 2010, ISBN 1-4012-2420-2)
    - Blackest Night: Green Lantern (collects vol. 4 #43–52, hc, 272 pages, 2010, ISBN 1-4012-2786-4; tpb, 2011, ISBN 1-4012-2952-2)
    - Blackest Night: Tales of the Corps (includes the co-feature from vol. 4 #49 and the "Tales of the Blue Lantern Corps: Saint Walker", "Tales of the Indigo Tribe", "Tales of the Red Lantern Corps: Fly Away" and "Tales of the Star Sapphires: Lost Love" stories from Blackest Night: Tales of the Corps #1–2, hc, 176 pages, 2010, ISBN 1-4012-2790-2; tpb, 2011, ISBN 1-4012-2807-0)
    - Green Lantern: Brightest Day (collects vol. 4 #53–62, hc, 272 pages, 2011, ISBN 1-4012-3181-0; tpb, 2012, ISBN 1-4012-3141-1)
    - War of the Green Lanterns (includes vol. 4 #63–67, hc, 272 pages, 2011, ISBN 1-4012-3234-5; tpb, 2012, ISBN 1-4012-3452-6)
    - Green Lantern: Sinestro (collects vol. 5 #1–6, hc, 160 pages, 2012, ISBN 1-4012-3454-2; tpb, 2013, ISBN 1-4012-3455-0)
    - Green Lantern: The Revenge of Black Hand (collects vol. 5 #7–12 and Annual, hc, 192 pages, 2013, ISBN 1-4012-3766-5; tpb, 2013, ISBN 1-4012-3767-3)
    - Green Lantern: The End (collects vol. 5 #0, 13–20, hc, 264 pages, 2013, ISBN 1-4012-4408-4; tpb, 2014, ISBN 1-4012-4684-2)
    - Green Lantern by Geoff Johns Omnibus Volume 1 (collects vol. 4 #1–25, Rebirth #1–6, Recharge #1–5, Secret Files & Origins 2005, Sinestro Corps Special and Tales of the Sinestro Corps: Superman-Prime, hc, 1,232 pages, 2015, ISBN 1-4012-5134-X)
    - Green Lantern by Geoff Johns Omnibus Volume 2 (collects vol. 4 #26–52, Rage of the Red Lanterns, Blackest Night #0–8, Blackest Night: Tales of the Corps #1–3 and Untold Tales of Blackest Night, hc, 1,040 pages, 2015, ISBN 1-4012-5526-4)
    - Green Lantern by Geoff Johns Omnibus Volume 3 (collects vol. 4 #53–67, vol. 5 #0–20 and Annual, Larfleeze Christmas Special, hc, 1,104 pages, 2016, ISBN 1-4012-5820-4)
  - Green Lantern Corps: Recharge (co-written by Johns and Dave Gibbons, art by Patrick Gleason) (5-issue limited series, 2005–2006)
  - Green Lantern: Sinestro Corps Special (with Ethan Van Sciver and Dave Gibbons) (one-shot, 2007)
  - Tales of the Sinestro Corps: Superman-Prime (with Pete Woods) (one-shot, 2007)
  - Final Crisis: Rage of the Red Lanterns (with Shane Davis) (one-shot, 2008)
  - Blackest Night: Tales of the Corps #1–2: "Tales of the Blue Lantern Corps: Saint Walker" (with Jerry Ordway), "Tales of the Indigo Tribe" (with Rags Morales), "Tales of the Red Lantern Corps: Fly Away" (with Eddy Barrows), "Tales of the Star Sapphires: Lost Love" (with Gene Ha) (3-issue limited series, 2009)
  - Green Lantern: Larfleeze Christmas Special: "~~Aren't~~ Orange You Glad It's Christmas?!" (with Brett Booth, one-shot, 2011)
  - Green Lantern: The Movie Prequels (tpb, 128 pages, 2011, ISBN 1-4012-3313-9) includes:
    - Green Lantern Movie Prequel: Hal Jordan (co-written by Johns and Greg Berlanti, art by Jerry Ordway, one-shot, 2011)
    - Green Lantern Movie Prequel: Sinestro (co-written by Johns and Michael Goldenberg, art by Jerry Ordway, one-shot, 2011)
  - Green Lanterns: Rebirth (co-written by Johns and Sam Humphries, art by Ethan Van Sciver and Ed Benes, one-shot, 2016) collected in Green Lanterns: Rage Planet (tpb, 176 pages, 2017, ISBN 1-4012-6775-0)
  - Green Lantern: 80th Anniversary 100-Page Super Spectacular: "Last Will" (art by Ivan Reis, anthology one-shot, 2020)
- Teen Titans:
  - Young Justice: Sins of Youth (tpb, 320 pages, 2000, ISBN 1-56389-748-2) includes:
    - Sins of Youth: Starwoman and the JSA, Jr.: "Stars and Tykes" (with Drew Johnson, one-shot, 2000)
    - Sins of Youth: Secret Files & Origins: "Crisis on Infantile Earths" (co-written by Johns and Ben Raab, art by Carlo Barberi, co-feature, 2000)
  - The Titans (co-written by Johns and Ben Raab):
    - The Titans Annual: "The Way of the Warrior" (with Justiniano) and "Immortal Justice: The Legacy of Bushido" (with Rick Mays, 2000)
    - The Titans Secret Files & Origins #2 (co-features, 2000):
      - "Super Friends" (with Drew Johnson)
      - "Shifting Gears" (with Georges Jeanty)
      - "Who is Tara Markov?" (with Derec Aucoin)
  - Teen Titans vol. 3 (with Mike McKone, Tom Grummett (#7–8, 13–15, 20), Matthew Clark (#24–25), Tony Daniel, Todd Nauck (#31–33), Carlos Ferreira (#38), Peter Snejbjerg (#42) and Al Barrionuevo (#45–46), 2003–2007) collected as:
    - Teen Titans by Geoff Johns Book One (collects #½, 1–12, tpb, 368 pages, 2017, ISBN 1-4012-6598-7)
      - Includes the "A Day After..." short story (co-written by Johns and Judd Winick, art by Carlo Barberi and Ivan Reis) from Teen Titans/Outsiders Secret Files (one-shot, 2003)
    - Teen Titans by Geoff Johns Book Two (collects #13–19, tpb, 320 pages, 2018, ISBN 1-4012-7752-7)
      - Includes the "Passenger 15B" short story (co-written by Johns and Ben Raab, art by Justiniano) from Legends of the DC Universe 80-Page Giant #2 (anthology, 1999)
      - Includes the 4-issue spin-off limited series Beast Boy (co-written by Johns and Ben Raab, art by Justiniano, 2000)
      - Includes Teen Titans/Legion Special (co-written by Johns and Mark Waid, art by Joe Prado and Ivan Reis, 2004)
    - Teen Titans by Geoff Johns Book Three (collects #20–26 and 29–31, tpb, 296 pages, 2019, ISBN 1-4012-8952-5)
    - Teen Titans: Life and Death (collects #29–33 and Annual, tpb, 208 pages, 2006, ISBN 1-4012-0978-5)
      - Issue #33 and Annual are scripted by Johns from plots by Marv Wolfman.
    - Teen Titans: Titans Around the World (collects #34–41, tpb, 192 pages, 2007, ISBN 1-4012-1217-4)
    - Teen Titans: Titans East (collects #42–46, tpb, 144 pages, 2007, ISBN 1-4012-1447-9)
      - Issues #44–46 are scripted by Adam Beechen from Johns' plots.
    - Teen Titans: Titans of Tomorrow (includes the short story from #50, tpb, 144 pages, 2008, ISBN 1-4012-1807-5)
    - Teen Titans by Geoff Johns Omnibus (collects #½, 1–26, 29–46, Annual, Beast Boy #1–4, Teen Titans/Legion Special and the short stories, hc, 1,440 pages, 2013, ISBN 1-4012-3693-6)
- The Flash:
  - The Flash vol. 2 (with Angel Unzueta, Scott Kolins, Rick Burchett (#189), Justiniano (#190, 219, ½), Phil Winslade (#196), Alberto Dose (#200–206), Howard Porter, Steven Cummings (#212) and Peter Snejbjerg (#218), 2000–2005) collected as:
    - The Flash by Geoff Johns Book One (collects #164–176, tpb, 448 pages, 2015, ISBN 1-4012-5873-5)
      - Includes The Flash: Iron Heights one-shot (written by Johns, art by Ethan Van Sciver, 2001)
    - The Flash by Geoff Johns Book Two (collects #177–188, tpb, 416 pages, 2016, ISBN 1-4012-6101-9)
      - Includes The Flash: Our Worlds at War one-shot (written by Johns, art by Angel Unzueta, 2001)
      - Includes the "Rogues" short story (art by Scott Kolins) from The Flash Secret Files & Origins #3 (2001)
      - Includes the DC First: Superman/The Flash one-shot (written by Johns, art by Rick Burchett, 2002)
    - The Flash by Geoff Johns Book Three (collects #189–200, tpb, 350 pages, 2016, ISBN 1-4012-6498-0)
    - The Flash by Geoff Johns Book Four (collects #201–213, tpb, 320 pages, 2017, ISBN 1-4012-7365-3)
    - The Flash by Geoff Johns Book Five (collects #214–219, ½, 220–225, tpb, 336 pages, 2018, ISBN 1-4012-8107-9)
    - The Flash by Geoff Johns Omnibus Volume 1 (collects #164–191 and the one-shots, hc, 848 pages, 2019, ISBN 1-4012-9532-0)
    - The Flash by Geoff Johns Omnibus Volume 2 (collects #192–219, ½, 220–225, hc, 872 pages, 2021, ISBN 1-77950-750-X)
  - The Flash by Geoff Johns Book Six (tpb, 344 pages, 2019, ISBN 1-4012-9263-1) collects:
    - Final Crisis: Rogues' Revenge #1–3 (with Scott Kolins, 2008) also collected as Final Crisis: Rogues' Revenge (hc, 144 pages, 2009, ISBN 1-4012-2333-8; tpb, 2010, ISBN 1-4012-2334-6)
    - The Flash: Rebirth #1–6 (with Ethan Van Sciver, 2009–2010) also collected as The Flash: Rebirth (hc, 168 pages, 2010, ISBN 1-4012-2568-3; tpb, 2011, ISBN 1-4012-3001-6)
    - Blackest Night: The Flash #1–3 (with Scott Kolins, 2010) also collected in Blackest Night: Black Lantern Corps Volume 2 (hc, 240 pages, 2010, ISBN 1-4012-2785-6; tpb, 2011, ISBN 1-4012-2803-8)
  - The Flash vol. 3 (with Francis Manapul and Scott Kolins, 2010–2011) collected as:
    - The Dastardly Death of the Rogues (collects #1–7, hc, 228 pages, 2011, ISBN 1-4012-2970-0; tpb, 2012, ISBN 1-4012-3195-0)
      - Includes the "Running to the Past" short story (art by Scott Kolins) from The Flash Secret Files & Origins (one-shot, 2010)
    - The Road to Flashpoint (collects #8–12, hc, 120 pages, 2011, ISBN 1-4012-3279-5; tpb, 2012, ISBN 1-4012-3448-8)
  - The Flash (with Scott Kolins, co-features in anniversary issues):
    - "Beer Run" (in #750, 2020)
    - "Blitz Back" (in #800, 2023)
- Silver Age: Showcase: "Showcase Presents the Seven Soldiers of Victory" (with Dick Giordano, one-shot, 2000)
- Superman:
  - Superman: The Man of Steel:
    - "Diamonds and Steel" (with Todd Nauck, in #121, 2002)
    - "Lost Hearts, Part Three: Giving In" (with Tom Derenick, in #133, 2003)
  - Superman vol. 2:
    - "What Can One Icon Do?" (scripted by Jeph Loeb from a story by Loeb and Johns, art by Ariel Olivetti, in #179, 2002)
    - "The House of Dracula" (scripted by Jeph Loeb from a story by Loeb and Johns, art by Ian Churchill, in #180, 2002)
    - Superman: Return to Krypton (tpb, 208 pages, 2004, ISBN 1-4012-0194-6) includes:
      - "Return to Krypton II, Part One: Rising Son" (with Pasqual Ferry, in #184, 2002)
    - Superman: The Man of Steel — Believe (digest-sized tpb, 128 pages, 2013, ISBN 1-4012-4705-9) includes:
      - "The Second Landing" (with Brent Anderson, in #185, 2002)
    - Superman: Ending Battle (tpb, 192 pages, 2009, ISBN 1-4012-2259-5) includes:
      - "Ending Battle" (with Pasqual Ferry, in #186–187, 2002)
    - "Lost Hearts, Part One: Lost" (with Pasqual Ferry, in #189, 2003)
  - Superman/Batman Secret Files & Origins: "Recruits" (co-written by Johns and his brother Jeremy, art by Ivan Reis, co-feature, 2003) collected in Superman/Batman Omnibus Volume 1 (hc, 1,208 pages, 2020, ISBN 1-77950-029-7)
  - Superman Secret Files 2004: "Suicide Watch" (co-written by Johns and his brother Jeremy, art by Jim Fern, co-feature, 2004) collected in Superman: That Healing Touch (tpb, 168 pages, 2005, ISBN 1-4012-0453-8)
  - Action Comics:
    - Superman: Up, Up and Away! (tpb, 192 pages, 2006, ISBN 1-4012-0954-8) collects:
      - "Up, Up and Away! Parts One, Three, Five, Seven" (co-written by Johns and Kurt Busiek, art by Pete Woods, in Superman #650–653, 2006)
      - "Up, Up and Away! Parts Two, Four, Six, Eight" (co-written by Johns and Kurt Busiek, art by Pete Woods and Renato Guedes, in #837–840, 2006)
    - Superman: Last Son (hc, 160 pages, 2008, ISBN 1-4012-1343-X; tpb, 2009, ISBN 1-4012-1586-6) collects:
      - "Last Son" (co-written by Johns and Richard Donner, art by Adam Kubert, in #844–846, 851 and Annual #11, 2006–2008)
    - Supergirl: Ghosts of Krypton (tpb, 304 pages, 2017, ISBN 1-4012-7079-4) includes:
      - "Family" (co-written by Johns, Kurt Busiek and Fabian Nicieza, art by Renato Guedes, in #850, 2006)
    - Superman: Escape from Bizarro World (hc, 160 pages, 2008, ISBN 1-4012-1794-X; tpb, 2009, ISBN 1-4012-2033-9) collects:
      - "Escape from Bizarro World" (co-written by Johns and Richard Donner, art by Eric Powell, in #855–857, 2007)
    - Superman and the Legion of Super-Heroes (hc, 168 pages, 2008, ISBN 1-4012-1819-9; tpb, 2009, ISBN 1-4012-1904-7) collects:
      - "Superman and the Legion of Super-Heroes" (with Gary Frank, in #858–863, 2008)
    - "Batman and the Legion of Super-Heroes" (with Joe Prado, in #864, 2008)
    - World's Finest (tpb, 144 pages, 2010, ISBN 1-4012-2797-X) includes:
      - "The Terrible Toyman" (with Jesús Merino, in #865, 2008)
    - Superman: Brainiac (hc, 128 pages, 2009, ISBN 1-4012-2087-8; tpb, 2010, ISBN 1-4012-2088-6) collects:
      - "Brainiac" (with Gary Frank, in #866–870, 2008)
    - Superman: New Krypton Volume 1 (hc, 176 pages, 2009, ISBN 1-4012-2329-X; tpb, 2010, ISBN 1-4012-2330-3) includes:
      - Superman: New Krypton Special (co-written by Johns, James Robinson and Sterling Gates, art by Gary Frank, Pete Woods and Renato Guedes, 2008)
      - "New Krypton, Part Four: Beyond Doomsday" (with Pete Woods, in #871, 2009)
    - Superman: New Krypton Volume 2 (hc, 160 pages, 2009, ISBN 1-4012-2319-2; tpb, 2010, ISBN 1-4012-2320-6) includes:
      - "New Krypton, Part Seven: Brainiac Lives" (with Pete Woods, in #872, 2009)
      - "New Krypton, Part Ten: Birth of a Nation" (with Pete Woods and Renato Guedes, in #873, 2009)
    - Superman: New Krypton Volume 3 (hc, 144 pages, 2010, ISBN 1-4012-2636-1; tpb, 2011, ISBN 1-4012-2637-X) includes:
      - Annual #10 (co-written by Johns and Richard Donner, art by Art Adams, Eric Wight, Joe Kubert, Phil Jimenez, Rags Morales, Tony Daniel and Gary Frank, 2007)
    - Superman: Reign of Doomsday (hc, 200 pages, 2012, ISBN 1-4012-3345-7; tpb, 2013, ISBN 1-4012-3688-X) collects:
      - "Friday Night in the 21st Century" (with Gary Frank, co-feature in #900, 2011)
    - "The Car" (co-written by Johns and Richard Donner, art by Olivier Coipel, co-feature in #1000, 2018)
  - Superman: Secret Origin #1–6 (with Gary Frank, 2009–2010) collected as Superman: Secret Origin (hc, 224 pages, 2010, ISBN 1-4012-2697-3; tpb, 2011, ISBN 1-4012-3299-X)
  - Adventure Comics vol. 2 #0–3, 5–6: "Superboy" (with Francis Manapul, 2009–2010) collected as Superboy: The Boy of Steel (hc, 144 pages, 2010, ISBN 1-4012-2772-4; tpb, 2011, ISBN 1-4012-2773-2)
  - Superman vol. 3 #32–39: "The Men of Tomorrow" (with John Romita, Jr., 2014–2015) collected as Superman: The Men of Tomorrow (hc, 256 pages, 2015, ISBN 1-4012-5239-7; tpb, 2016, ISBN 1-4012-5868-9)
- Hawkman vol. 4 (with Rags Morales, Ethan Van Sciver (#13), Don Kramer (#14), José Luis García-López (#18) and Scot Eaton (#19); issues #1–6 and 9–10 are co-written by Johns and James Robinson, 2002–2004) collected as:
  - Hawkman by Geoff Johns Book One (collects #1–14, tpb, 376 pages, 2017, ISBN 1-4012-7290-8)
    - Includes the "Hidden Past, Hidden Future" short story (art by Patrick Gleason) from Hawkman Secret Files & Origins (one-shot, 2002)
  - Hawkman by Geoff Johns Book Two (collects #15–25 and JSA #56–58, tpb, 344 pages, 2018, ISBN 1-4012-7834-5)
  - Hawkman Omnibus Volume 1 (collects #1–25, JSA #56–58 and Hawkman Secret Files & Origins, hc, 688 pages, 2012, ISBN 1-4012-3222-1)
- 9-11 Volume 2: "A Burning Hate" (co-written by Johns and David S. Goyer, art by Humberto Ramos, anthology graphic novel, 224 pages, 2002, ISBN 1-56389-878-0)
- Batman:
  - Batman #606–607: "Death Wish for Two" (co-written by Johns and Ed Brubaker, art by Scott McDaniel, 2002) collected in Batman: Bruce Wayne — Fugitive (tpb, 432 pages, 2014, ISBN 1-4012-4682-6)
  - Batman: Gotham Knights #49: "Fear is the Key" (with Tommy Castillo, co-feature, 2004) collected in Batman: Black and White Volume 3 (hc, 288 pages, 2007, ISBN 1-4012-1531-9; tpb, 2008, ISBN 1-4012-1354-5)
  - DC Comics Presents: Batman: "Batman of Two Worlds" (with Carmine Infantino, co-feature in one-shot, 2004)
  - All-Star Batgirl (with J. G. Jones, unreleased out-of-continuity limited series — initially announced for 2007)
  - Batman: Earth One (with Gary Frank, series of graphic novels set in an alternate universe and published under its own imprint):
    - Volume 1 (hc, 144 pages, 2012, ISBN 1-4012-3208-6; sc, 2014, ISBN 1-4012-3209-4)
    - Volume 2 (hc, 144 pages, 2015, ISBN 1-4012-4185-9; sc, 2016, ISBN 1-4012-6251-1)
    - Volume 3 (hc, 160 pages, 2021, ISBN 1-4012-5904-9)
    - The Complete Collection (compilation of all three volumes — tpb, 464 pages, 2022, ISBN 1-77951-634-7)
  - Detective Comics #1000: "The Last Crime in Gotham" (with Kelley Jones, co-feature, 2019) collected in Batman: 80 Years of the Bat Family (tpb, 400 pages, 2020, ISBN 1-77950-658-9)
  - Batman: Three Jokers #1–3 (with Jason Fabok, DC Black Label, 2020) collected as Batman: Three Jokers (hc, 160 pages, 2020, ISBN 1-77950-023-8; tpb, 2023, ISBN 1-77952-453-6)
- Eye of the Storm Annual: "Time to Kill" (with Jason Pearson, co-feature, Wildstorm, 2003) collected in Wildstorm: A Celebration of 25 Years (hc, 300 pages, 2017, ISBN 1-4012-7652-0)
- The Possessed #1–6 (co-written by Johns and Kris Grimminger, art by Liam Sharp, Cliffhanger, 2003) collected as The Possessed (tpb, 144 pages, 2004, ISBN 1-4012-0292-6)
- Tom Strong #25: "Tom Strong's Pal Wally Willoughby" (with John Paul Leon, America's Best Comics, 2004) collected in Tom Strong Book Four (hc, 160 pages, 2005, ISBN 1-84576-093-X; tpb, 2005, ISBN 1-4012-0572-0)
- Infinite Crisis Omnibus (hc, 1,152 pages, 2012, ISBN 1-4012-3502-6) includes:
  - Countdown to Infinite Crisis (co-written by Johns, Judd Winick and Greg Rucka, art by Rags Morales, Ed Benes, Jesús Saiz, Ivan Reis and Phil Jimenez, one-shot, 2005)
  - JLA #115–119: "Crisis of Conscience" (co-written by Johns and Allan Heinberg, art by Chris Batista, 2005) also collected in JLA: The Deluxe Edition Volume 9 (tpb, 480 pages, 2017, ISBN 1-4012-6567-7)
  - Infinite Crisis #1–7 (with Phil Jimenez, George Pérez, Ivan Reis and Jerry Ordway (#5–6), 2005–2006) also collected as Infinite Crisis (hc, 264 pages, 2006, ISBN 1-4012-0959-9; tpb, 2008, ISBN 1-4012-1060-0)
- 52 (co-written by Johns, Mark Waid, Greg Rucka and Grant Morrison, art by various artists from layouts by Keith Giffen, 2006–2007) collected as:
  - Volume 1 (collects #1–13, tpb, 304 pages, 2007, ISBN 1-4012-1353-7)
  - Volume 2 (collects #14–26, tpb, 304 pages, 2007, ISBN 1-4012-1364-2)
  - Volume 3 (collects #27–39, tpb, 304 pages, 2007, ISBN 1-4012-1443-6)
  - Volume 4 (collects #40–52, tpb, 326 pages, 2007, ISBN 1-4012-1486-X)
  - Omnibus (collects #1–52, hc, 1,216 pages, 2012, ISBN 1-4012-3556-5)
- Booster Gold vol. 2 (co-written by Johns and Jeff Katz, art by Dan Jurgens, 2007–2008) collected as:
  - 52 Pick-Up (collects #1–6, hc, 160 pages, 2008, ISBN 1-4012-1787-7; tpb, 2009, ISBN 1-4012-2006-1)
  - Blue and Gold (collects #0, 7–10 and 1,000,000, hc, 160 pages, 2008, ISBN 1-4012-1956-X; tpb, 2010, ISBN 1-84576-970-8)
- Supernatural: Origins #1: "Speak No Evil" (with Phil Hester, co-feature, Wildstorm, 2007) collected in Supernatural: Origins (tpb, 144 pages, 2008, ISBN 1-4012-1701-X)
- DC Universe #0 (co-written by Johns and Grant Morrison; art by Ed Benes, George Pérez, Tony Daniel, Aaron Lopresti, Ivan Reis, Philip Tan, J. G. Jones, Doug Mahnke and Carlos Pacheco, one-shot, 2008)
- Final Crisis: Legion of Three Worlds #1–5 (with George Pérez, 2008–2009) collected as Final Crisis: Legion of Three Worlds (hc, 176 pages, 2009, ISBN 1-4012-2324-9; tpb, 2010, ISBN 1-4012-2325-7)
- Faces of Evil: Solomon Grundy: "The Curse!" (co-written by Johns and Scott Kolins, art by Kolins, one-shot, 2009) collected in Solomon Grundy (tpb, 192 pages, 2010, ISBN 1-4012-2586-1)
- Blackest Night Omnibus (hc, 1,664 pages, 2019, ISBN 1-4012-9119-8) includes:
  - Blackest Night #0–8 (with Ivan Reis, 2009–2010) also collected as Blackest Night (hc, 304 pages, 2010, ISBN 1-4012-2693-0; tpb, 2011, ISBN 1-4012-2953-0)
  - The Atom and Hawkman #46 (with Ryan Sook, 2010) also collected in Blackest Night: Rise of the Black Lanterns (hc, 256 pages, 2010, ISBN 1-4012-2789-9; tpb, 2011, ISBN 1-4012-2806-2)
  - Untold Tales of Blackest Night: "Deleted Scenes from Blackest Night" (with Ivan Reis, two co-features in the one-shot, 2010)
- Brightest Day (co-written by Johns and Peter Tomasi, art by Ivan Reis, Joe Prado, Patrick Gleason, Ardian Syaf and Scott Clark, 2010–2011) collected as:
  - Volume 1 (collects #0–7, hc, 256 pages, 2010, ISBN 1-4012-2966-2; tpb, 2011, ISBN 1-4012-3276-0)
  - Volume 2 (collects #8–16, hc, 240 pages, 2011, ISBN 1-4012-3083-0; tpb, 2012, ISBN 1-4012-3084-9)
  - Volume 3 (collects #17–24, hc, 224 pages, 2011, ISBN 1-4012-3216-7; tpb, 2012, ISBN 1-4012-3217-5)
  - Omnibus (collects #0–24, hc, 656 pages, 2014, ISBN 1-4012-4597-8)
- Wonder Woman #600: "The Sensational Wonder Woman" (with Scott Kolins, co-feature, 2010)
- Flashpoint #1–5 (with Andy Kubert, 2011) collected as Flashpoint (hc, 176 pages, 2011, ISBN 1-4012-3337-6; tpb, 2012, ISBN 1-4012-3338-4)
- Justice League of America:
  - Justice League vol. 2 (with Jim Lee, Gene Ha (#7, 20), Carlos D'Anda (#8), Ivan Reis, Tony Daniel (#13–14), Jesús Saiz (#18), Doug Mahnke, Scott Kolins (#34), Jason Fabok and Francis Manapul (#45–46), 2011–2016) collected as:
    - Origin (collects #1–6, hc, 192 pages, 2012, ISBN 1-4012-3461-5; tpb, 2013, ISBN 1-4012-3788-6)
    - The Villain's Journey (collects #7–12, hc, 176 pages, 2013, ISBN 1-4012-3764-9; tpb, 2014, ISBN 1-4012-3765-7)
    - Throne of Atlantis (collects #13–17 and Aquaman vol. 5 #15–16, hc, 192 pages, 2013, ISBN 1-4012-4240-5; tpb, 2014, ISBN 1-4012-4698-2)
    - The Grid (collects #18–20 and 22–23, hc, 176 pages, 2014, ISBN 1-4012-4717-2; tpb, 2014, ISBN 1-4012-5008-4)
    - Forever Heroes (collects #24–29, hc, 168 pages, 2014, ISBN 1-4012-5009-2; tpb, 2015, ISBN 1-4012-5419-5)
    - Injustice League (collects #30–39, hc, 256 pages, 2015, ISBN 1-4012-5236-2; tpb, 2016, ISBN 1-4012-5852-2)
    - Darkseid War Volume 1 (collects the DC Sneak Peek: Justice League digital one-shot and #40–44, hc, 176 pages, 2016, ISBN 1-4012-5977-4; tpb, 2016, ISBN 1-4012-6452-2)
    - Darkseid War Volume 2 (collects #45–50, hc, 200 pages, 2016, ISBN 1-4012-6341-0; tpb, 2017, ISBN 1-4012-6539-1)
      - Includes Justice League: Darkseid War Special (written by Johns, art by Ivan Reis, Paul Pelletier and Oscar Jimenez, 2016)
    - The New 52 Omnibus Volume 1 (includes #0–23 and Aquaman vol. 5 #14–16, hc, 1,248 pages, 2021, ISBN 1-77951-066-7)
    - The New 52 Omnibus Volume 2 (collects #24–52, Forever Evil #1–7, the DC Sneak Peek: Justice League one-shot and Justice League: Darkseid War Special, hc, 1,256 pages, 2022, ISBN 1-77951-558-8)
  - Justice League International vol. 2 Annual: "Deleted" (co-written by Johns and Dan Didio, art by Jason Fabok, 2012) collected in Justice League International: Breakdown (tpb, 224 pages, 2013, ISBN 1-4012-3793-2)
  - Justice League of America vol. 3 #1–7 (with David Finch, Brett Booth (#4–5) and Doug Mahnke (#6–7); issues #6–7 are co-written by Johns and Jeff Lemire, 2013)
    - Collected as Justice League of America: World's Most Dangerous (hc, 224 pages, 2013, ISBN 1-4012-4236-7; tpb, 2014, ISBN 1-4012-4689-3)
    - Collected in Justice League: The New 52 Omnibus Volume 1 (hc, 1,248 pages, 2021, ISBN 1-77951-066-7)
- Aquaman:
  - Aquaman vol. 5 (with Ivan Reis, Pere Pérez with Pete Woods (#14) and Paul Pelletier, 2011–2013) collected as:
    - The Trench (collects #1–6, hc, 144 pages, 2012, ISBN 1-4012-3551-4; tpb, 2013, ISBN 1-4012-3710-X)
    - The Others (collects #7–13, hc, 160 pages, 2013, ISBN 1-4012-4016-X; tpb, 2013, ISBN 1-4012-4295-2)
    - Throne of Atlantis (collects #0, 14–16 and Justice League vol. 2 #15–17, hc, 192 pages, 2013, ISBN 1-4012-4309-6; tpb, 2014, ISBN 1-4012-4695-8)
    - Death of a King (collects #17–19 and 21–25, hc, 200 pages, 2014, ISBN 1-4012-4696-6; tpb, 2014, ISBN 1-4012-4995-7)
    - Aquaman by Geoff Johns Omnibus (collects #0–19, 21–25 and Justice League vol. 2 #15–17, hc, 723 pages, 2018, ISBN 1-4012-8546-5)
  - Aquaman: 80th Anniversary 100-Page Super Spectacular: "Father's Day" (with Paul Pelletier, anthology one-shot, 2021)
- Captain Marvel:
  - Justice League vol. 2 #7–11, 0, 14–16, 18–21: "Shazam!" (with Gary Frank, co-feature, 2012–2013) collected as Shazam! (hc, 192 pages, 2013, ISBN 1-4012-4244-8; tpb, 2014, ISBN 1-4012-4699-0)
  - Shazam! vol. 2 #1–11, 13–14 (with Dale Eaglesham, Mayo Naito (#1, 3), Marco Santucci and Scott Kolins, 2019–2020) collected as Shazam and the Seven Magic Lands (tpb, 344 pages, 2020, ISBN 1-77950-459-4)
- Ghosts: "Ghost-for-Hire" (with Jeff Lemire, anthology one-shot, Vertigo, 2012) collected in The Unexpected (tpb, 160 pages, 2013, ISBN 1-4012-4394-0)
- Masters of the Universe vol. 6 #1: "The Lost Knight" (with Howard Porter, digital anthology, 2012) collected in He-Man and the Masters of the Universe Volume 1 (tpb, 160 pages, 2013, ISBN 1-4012-4022-4)
- Justice League of America's Vibe #1–2 (co-written by Johns and Andrew Kreisberg, art by Pete Woods, 2013) collected in Justice League of America's Vibe: Breach (tpb, 232 pages, 2014, ISBN 1-4012-4331-2)
- Forever Evil #1–7 (with David Finch, 2013–2014) collected as Forever Evil (hc, 240 pages, 2014, ISBN 1-4012-4891-8; tpb, 2015, ISBN 1-4012-5338-5)
- DC Universe: Rebirth: "The Clock is Ticking Across the DC Universe!" (with Gary Frank, Ethan Van Sciver, Ivan Reis and Phil Jimenez, one-shot, 2016)
- Doomsday Clock (with Gary Frank, 2018–2020) collected as:
  - Part One (collects #1–6, hc, 224 pages, 2019, ISBN 1-77950-120-X)
  - Part Two (collects #7–12, hc, 232 pages, 2020, ISBN 1-77950-118-8)
  - The Complete Collection (collects #1–12, tpb, 456 pages, 2020, ISBN 1-77950-605-8)
  - The Absolute Edition (collects #1–12, hc, 496 pages, 2022, ISBN 1-77951-560-X)
- Dark Nights: Death Metal — Secret Origin (co-written by Johns and Scott Snyder, art by various artists, one-shot, 2021) collected in Dark Nights: Death Metal — The Multiverse Who Laughs (tpb, 208 pages, 2021, ISBN 1-77950-793-3)
- Flashpoint Beyond #0 (with Eduardo Risso) and 1–6 (co-written by Johns, Jeremy Adams and Tim Sheridan, art by Xermánico and Mikel Janín, 2022) collected as Flashpoint Beyond (tpb, 144 pages, 2022, ISBN 1-77951-737-8)
- The New Golden Age (with Diego Olortegui, Jerry Ordway, Steve Lieber, Todd Nauck, Scott Kolins, Viktor Bogdanovic, Brandon Peterson and Gary Frank, one-shot, 2023)

== Marvel Comics ==
Titles published by Marvel include:

- Morlocks #1–4 (with Shawn Martinbrough, 2002)
- X-Men: Millennial Visions #2: "X-Men Reborn" (text for an illustration by Ethan Van Sciver, 2002)
- Ultimate X-Men #½ (with Aaron Lopresti, 2002) collected in Ultimate X-Men Volume 6 (hc, 256 pages, 2006, ISBN 0-7851-2104-8)
- Icons: The Thing — Freakshow #1–4 (with Scott Kolins, 2002) collected as The Thing: Freakshow (tpb, 144 pages, 2005, ISBN 0-7851-1911-6)
- Icons: The Vision #1–4 (with Ivan Reis, 2002–2003) collected as The Vision: Yesterday and Tomorrow (tpb, 120 pages, 2005, ISBN 0-7851-1912-4)
- The Avengers vol. 3 (with Kieron Dwyer, Gary Frank (#61–62), Alan Davis (#63), Ivan Reis (#64), Olivier Coipel, Stephen Sadowski (#71, 76) and Scott Kolins, 2002–2004) collected as:
  - The Avengers by Geoff Johns: The Complete Collection Volume 1 (collects #57–63 and Icons: The Vision #1–4, tpb, 312 pages, 2013, ISBN 0-7851-8433-3)
  - The Avengers by Geoff Johns: The Complete Collection Volume 2 (collects #64–76, tpb, 304 pages, 2013, ISBN 0-7851-8439-2)

== Image Comics ==
Titles published by Image include:

- Noble Causes: Extended Family #1: "Temper, Temper" (with Brent David McKee, anthology, 2003) collected in Noble Causes Archives Volume 2 (tpb, 598 pages, 2009, ISBN 1-58240-931-5)
- Witchblade #67 (co-written by Johns and Kris Grimminger, art by Scott Benefiel, Top Cow, 2003) collected in Witchblade Compendium Volume 2 (tpb, 1,280 pages, 2008, ISBN 1-58240-731-2)
- Tomb Raider: Scarface's Treasure (with Mark Texeira, one-shot, Top Cow, 2003)
- Liberty Annual '10: "X-Rayz" (with Scott Kolins, anthology, 2010) collected in CBLDF Presents: Liberty (hc, 216 pages, 2014, ISBN 1-60706-937-7; tpb, 2016, ISBN 1-60706-996-2)
- The Unnamed Universe (series of interconnected titles published under Johns' own company, Ghost Machine):
  - Geiger #1–6 (with Gary Frank, 2021) collected as Geiger (tpb, 160 pages, 2021, ISBN 1-5343-2002-4)
  - Geiger 80-Page Giant: "Who is Redcoat?" (with Bryan Hitch) — "Where'd He Find Barney?" (with Gary Frank) — "Tales of the Unknown War" (with Paul Pelletier, anthology one-shot, 2022)
    - Also includes a number of stories from various other creators:
      - "The Safari" (written by Peter Tomasi, drawn by Peter Snejbjerg)
      - "The Karloff" (written by Sterling Gates, drawn by Kelley Jones)
      - "Nero's" (written by Leon Hendrix III, drawn by Staz Johnson)
      - "Goldbeard's" (written by Pornsak Pichetshote, drawn by Sean Galloway)
      - "The Manhattan" (written by Janet Harvey-Nevala, drawn by Megan Levens)
      - "Saturn 7" (written by Jay Faerber, drawn by Joe Prado)
  - Junkyard Joe #1–6 (with Gary Frank, 2022–2023) collected as Junkyard Joe (tpb, 208 pages, 2023, ISBN 1-5343-2589-1)
  - Image! #1–12: "The Blizzard" (with Andrea Mutti, anthology, 2022–2023)
  - Geiger: Ground Zero #1-2 (with Gary Frank, 2023)
  - Ghost Machine #1: "Geiger" (with Gary Frank), "Redcoat" (with Bryan Hitch), "Rook: Exodus" (with Jason Fabok), "Hyde Street Amusements" (with Lamont Magee and Ivan Reis), and "Hyde Street" (with Ivan Reis) Also includes a number of stories from various other creators:
    - "The Rocketfellers" (written by Peter Tomsai, drawn by Francis Manapul)
    - "Hornsby and Halo" (written by Peter Tomsai, drawn by Peter Snejbjerg)
    - "Devor" (written by Maytal Zchut, drawn by Ivan Reis)
  - Geiger (vol. 2) #1- (with Gary Frank, 2024-present)
  - Redcoat #1- (with Bryan Hitch, 2024-present)
  - Rook: Exodus #1- (with Jason Fabok, 2024-present)
  - Hyde Street #1- (with Ivan Reis, 2024-present)

== Other publishers ==
Titles published by various publishers around the world include:

- Humanoids Publishing:
  - Métal Hurlant vol. 2 #2: "Red Light" (with Christian Gossett, anthology, 2002)
    - Collected in Métal Hurlant Volume 1 (hc, 192 pages, 2011, ISBN 1-59465-026-8)
    - Collected in Métal Hurlant: Selected Works (tpb, 240 pages, 2020, ISBN 1-64337-519-9)
  - Olympus (co-written by Johns and Kris Grimminger, art by Butch Guice, graphic novel, sc, 112 pages, 2005, ISBN 1-4012-0643-3; hc, 2015, ISBN 1-59465-137-X)
- Aspen MLT:
  - Ekos Preview (with Michael Turner, 2003)
  - Michael Turner Presents: Aspen #1–3 (with Michael Turner, 2003)
- More Fund Comics: An All-Star Benefit Comic for the CBLDF: "Workin' the Beach" (with Scott Kolins, anthology graphic novel, 144 pages, Sky Dog, 2003, ISBN 0-9721831-2-4)
- Dark Horse:
  - B.P.R.D.: Night Train (with Scott Kolins, one-shot, 2003) collected in B.P.R.D.: The Soul of Venice and Other Stories (tpb, 128 pages, 2004, ISBN 1-59307-132-9)
  - Black Hammer: Visions #2 (with Scott Kolins, anthology, 2021) collected in Black Hammer: Visions Volume 1 (hc, 112 pages, 2021, ISBN 1-5067-2326-8)
