= Crimson (comic book) =

Vampire comic book series

- Cover of Crimson vol. 1

Publication information
- Publisher: Cliffhanger; WildStorm (DC Comics)
- Schedule: Monthly
- Publication date: May 1998 – February 2001
- No. of issues: 24 plus one special
- Main character(s): Alex Elder

Creative team
- Created by: Humberto Ramos; Oscar Pinto; Francisco Haghenbeck
- Written by: Brian Augustyn; Francisco Haghenbeck; Oscar Pinto; Humberto Ramos
- Penciller(s): Humberto Ramos
- Inker(s): Chris Elarmo; Sandra Hope
- Letterer(s): Amie Grenier
- Colorist(s): Alex Bleyaert; Ian Hannin; Rob Ro
- Editor(s): Scott Dunbier

Collected editions
- Loyalty and Loss: ISBN 1-56389-532-3
- Heaven & Earth: ISBN 1-56389-647-8
- Earth Angel: ISBN 1-56389-768-7
- Redemption: ISBN 1-56389-790-3

Crimson is a fantasy-horror vampire comic book series created from artist Humberto Ramos and writer Brian Augustyn, from story concepts by Francisco Haghenbeck and Oscar Pinto.

== Publication history ==
The series debuted in 1998 and ran for twenty-four issues. The first seven issues were published as part of the Image Comics' Cliffhanger imprint of creator-owned comics and then the final seventeen at DC Comics' WildStorm imprint.

Also published were a Crimson Sourcebook special issue as well as a one-shot starring Scarlet X. Scarlet X - Blood on the Moon was set in Mexico and featured the origin of Joe the Indian.

== Plot ==
Crimson revolves around a young man named Alex Elder who is attacked by a gang of vampires while out late with his friends. Bitten, Alex is saved by Ekimus, the last of an ancient race pre-dating humanity, who claims Alex is "The Chosen One". Alex becomes the first and last of his kind, gaining powers beyond that of a normal vampire, who is destined to bring the end to vampirekind. The series follows Alex as he adjusts to life as a vampire and shoulders the responsibilities of being a hero. The comic features not only vampires, but werewolves and other supernatural beings and elements, as well as Biblical themes and deities.

== Main characters ==
- Alex Elder is the protagonist and a sixteen-year-old teenager who on a night out with friends is ambushed by a savage vampire gang. He is saved by Ekimus, who feeds Alex his blood and turns him into "The Chosen One": a vampire endowed with magical powers so as to destroy all other vampires, and who is chronicled to save the world from the coming apocalypse.
- Ekimus is a wise, repentant, and ancient being known as a "Grigori", who guides Alex in his new life as a vampire. He is known as the source of all vampirism throughout the world.
- Scarlet Thinbault X is a female operative and daughter of "The Order of the Red Hood", a family-led organisation dedicated to hunting and destroying demonic creatures. She befriends Alex and later becomes his love interest.
- José, nicknamed "Joe", is a Mexican Indian vampire who becomes Alex's street mentor and best friend.
- Lisseth is the main antagonist, and Ekimus' former lover. She is coined "The Mother of All Vampires", bent on bringing about the apocalypse and ruling all of creation.
- Victor Van Fleet is a U.S. senator and powerful vampire lord with aspirations for the presidency. He is allied with Lisseth.

== Collected editions ==
The series has been collected by DC Comics into four trade paperbacks:

- Crimson:
  - Loyalty and Loss (collects #1–6, 160 pages, June 1999, ISBN 1-56389-532-3)
  - Heaven & Earth (collects #7–12, 160 pages, February 2000, ISBN 1-56389-647-8)
  - Earth Angel (collects #13–18, 160 pages, March 2001, ISBN 1-56389-768-7)
  - Redemption (collects #19–24, 160 pages, October 2001, ISBN 1-56389-790-3)

The whole series has also been collected in hardcover:

- The Complete Crimson (collects #1–24 as well as Crimson: Scarlett X Blood on the Moon, and the Crimson Sourcebook, 640 pages, August 2018, ISBN 1-68415-167-8)

== Other media ==
=== Toys ===
Palisades Toys released toys based on the series.
