= Humberto Ramos =

Mexican comic book penciller (born 1970)

- Born: 27 November 1970 (age 55)
- Area: Penciller
- Notable works: Impulse; Crimson; Peter Parker Spider-Man; The Spectacular Spider-Man; Civil War: Wolverine; Runaways; The Amazing Spider-Man
- Awards: Inkpot Award (2015)

Humberto Ramos (born 27 November 1970) is a Mexican comic book artist. He is best known for his work on American comic books such as Impulse, Runaways,The Amazing Spider-Man, The Spectacular Spider-Man, and his creator-owned series Crimson.

== Career ==
Humberto Ramos began his career in 1989 at Kaboom Cómics. He was later hired by DC Comics as the regular penciller for their Flash spin-off Impulse, which launched in March 1995. Written by Mark Waid, the superhero/teen comedy series focused on young speedster Bart Allen, the grandson of the second Flash, Barry Allen, and his struggles with growing up in Manchester, Alabama.

In 1998, Ramos co-founded the imprint Cliffhanger with comic book artists Joe Madureira and J. Scott Campbell. They created the imprint, housed by Jim Lee's Image Comics division Wildstorm, to publish their creator-owned comic books outside the mainstream superhero genre. Both Campbell and Madureira had already built large fanbases with their previous work on Gen^{13} and Uncanny X-Men respectively, and were two of the most popular comic book artists at the time. Ramos, on the other hand, was not as popular and his inclusion on the imprint was perceived as second choice, after fan-favorite Michael Turner declined because he was still under contract at Top Cow. Ramos' first Cliffhanger title Crimson ran for 24 issues and two one-shots, with poor success. It was followed by the fantasy/mystery series Out There, months later. Ramos also began illustrating the covers of Peter Parker: Spider-Man with issue #30 and—beginning with May 2002's Peter Parker: Spider-Man #44—additionally did the interior artwork on the four-issue story arc "A Death in the Family" (later collected as Spider-Man: Return of the Goblin; ISBN 0-7851-1019-4), written by Paul Jenkins.

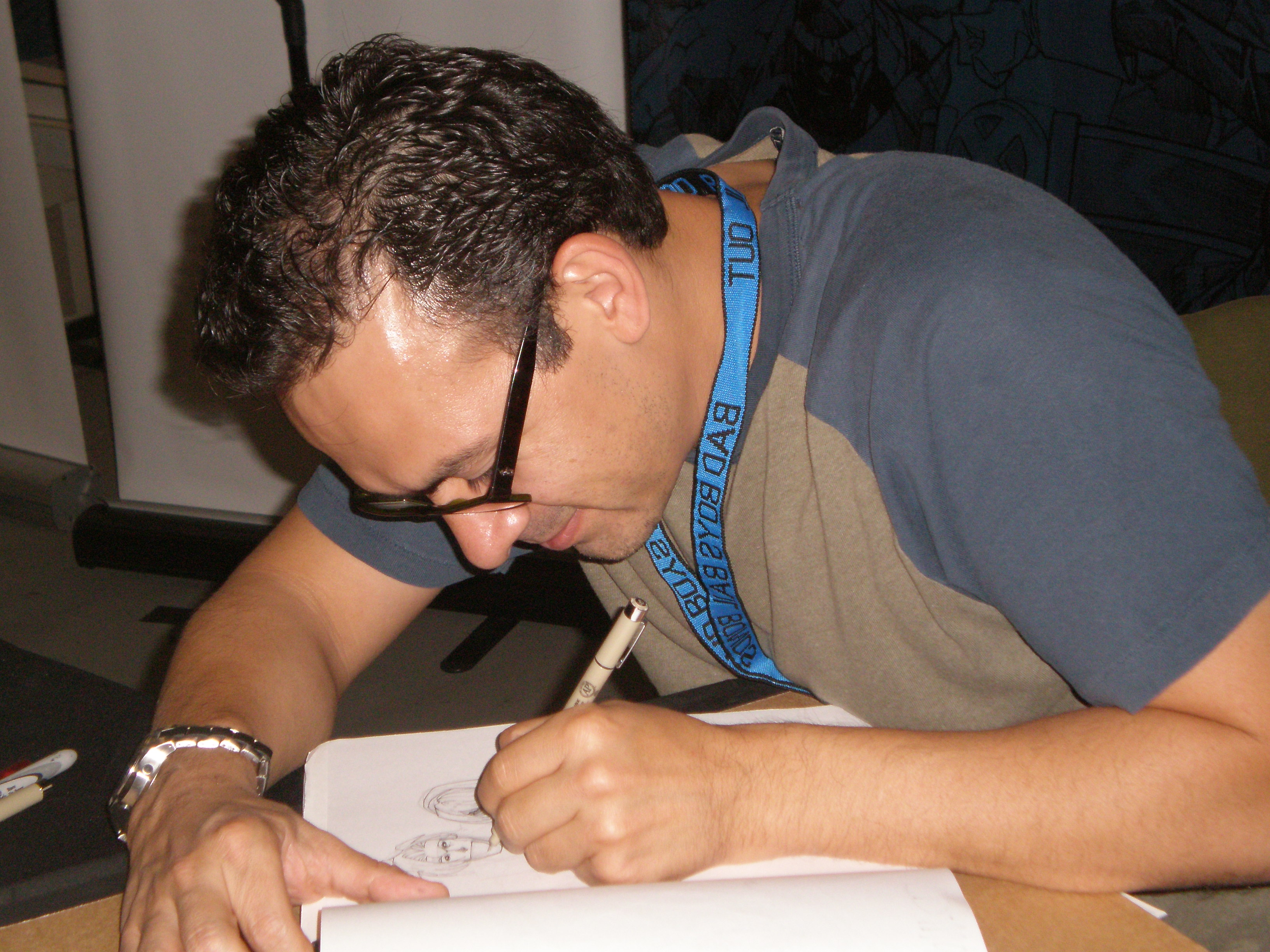
Ramos at Super-Con 2009 in San Jose, California

After his Cliffhanger contract expired, and Out There concluded after 18 issues in early 2003, Ramos left the imprint, apparently not on the best terms, and launched a new Spider-Man title, The Spectacular Spider-Man. The book reunited Ramos with Peter Parker: Spider-Man writer Paul Jenkins and earned him a 2005 Harvey Award nomination as Best Cover Artist. While Ramos worked on Spectacular Spider-Man, another book created by him (although illustrated by Francisco Herrera), the six-issue miniseries Kamikaze, which had originally been planned for 2001, was published by WildStorm under the Cliffhanger imprint.

In 2005, Ramos' creator-owned six-issue miniseries Revelations began publication by Dark Horse Comics.

Following Revelations, Ramos returned to Marvel Comics, joining writer Marc Guggenheim as the new creative team on Wolverine, beginning with issue #42 in March 2006. The same month also saw the release of the first volume of the space opera Kookaburra K, a series of three 46-page comic albums Ramos illustrated for French comic publisher Soleil Productions, written by French comic book creator Crisse.

Ramos worked with writer Terry Moore on Runaways from 2008 to 2009, and became one of the regular artists on The Amazing Spider-Man in 2010.

In April 2014, Ramos and writer Dan Slott launched The Amazing Spider-Man as part of Marvel NOW!. The first issue of this new version of The Amazing Spider-Man is, according to Diamond Comics Distributors, "The Best Selling Comic of the 21st Century." In 2016, Ramos and writer Mark Waid co-created The Champions for Marvel.

== Bibliography ==
=== Interior work ===
- Hardware (with Dwayne McDuffie, Milestone):
  - "A Bird in the Hand" (in #15, 1994)
  - "The Landing of the Mothership" (in #19, 1994)
  - "Trust Never Sleeps" (with Matt Wayne and Adam S. Blaustein, in #22-24, 1994–1995)
  - "Hard Times" (with Denys Cowan, in #25, 1995)
  - "Keep on Pushin" (in #29, 1995)
- Steel (DC Comics):
  - "Worlds Collide" (with Louise Simonson and Chris Batista, in #7, 1994)
  - "Crucible of Freedom" (with Jon Bogdanove, in Annual #1, 1994)
- Blood Syndicate #18: "Silent Vigil" (with Nat Gertler, DC Comics, 1994)
- Superboy #9-10 (with Karl Kesel, DC Comics, 1994)
- Impulse #1-6, 8–13, 16–17, 19–20, 23-25 (with Mark Waid, DC Comics, 1995–1997)
- Shi: Senryaku #3 (with Gary Cohn and various artists, Crusade, 1995)
- The Flash Annual #8: "Kid Flash, Day Two!" (with Tom Peyer, DC Comics, 1995)
- The Savage Hulk: "The Strongest One There is" (with Scott Lobdell, one-shot, Marvel, 1996)
- Static #32: "Full Yellow Jacket" (with Adam S. Blaustein and Yves Fezzani, DC Comics, 1996)
- Gen^{13} #9: "Hearts and Minds" (with J. Scott Campbell, Brandon Choi and Jim Lee, Wildstorm, 1996)
- X-Nation 2099 #1-3 (with Tom Peyer and Ben Raab, Marvel, 1996)
- Gen^{13}: The Unreal World (with Michael Heisler, one-shot, Wildstorm, 1996)
- DV8 (with Warren Ellis, Wildstorm):
  - DV8: Rave (one-shot, 1996)
  - DV8 #1-2, 4-7 (1996–1997)
- Ash (Event):
  - Ash/22 Brides #1-2 (with Fabian Nicieza, 1996–1997)
  - Ash #½ (with Mark Waid, Brian Augustyn, James Robinson and Joe Quesada, 1997)
  - Ash: Cinder and Smoke #1-6 (with Mark Waid and Brian Augustyn, 1997)
- Uncanny X-Men #346: "The Story of the Year!" (with Scott Lobdell and Joe Madureira, Marvel, 1997)
- Crimson #1-24 (with Brian Augustyn, Oscar Pinto, Francisco Gerardo Haghenbeck, Cliffhanger, 1998–2001)
- JLA: World Without Grown-Ups #1-2 (with Todd Dezago and Mike McKone, DC Comics, 1998)
- Secret Origins 80-Page Giant #1: "The Secret Origin of Impulse Actual Reality" (with Mark Waid, DC Comics, 1998)
- Supermen of America: "Heroes for the Next Century!" (with Stuart Immonen, Norm Breyfogle, Ron Lim and Sean Phillips, one-shot, DC Comics, 1999)
- Superman #165: "Help!" (with Jeph Loeb, DC Comics, 2001)
- Out There #1-18 (with Brian Augustyn, Cliffhanger, 2001–2003)
- 9-11:
  - "Untitled" (script and art, in Volume 1, Dark Horse, 2002)
  - "A Burning Hate" (with David S. Goyer and Geoff Johns, in Volume 2, DC Comics, 2002)
- Peter Parker: Spider-Man #44-47: "A Death in the Family" (with Paul Jenkins, Marvel, 2002)
- The Spectacular Spider-Man #1-10, 17-18 (with Paul Jenkins, Marvel, 2003–2004)
- Revelations #1-6 (with Paul Jenkins, Dark Horse, 2005–2006)
- Wolverine #42-48: "Vendetta" (with Marc Guggenheim, Marvel, 2006)
- X-Men v2 #194-196, 200-203 (with Mike Carey, Marvel, 2006–2007)
- Kookaburra K #1-3 (with Crisse and James Hicks, Soleil Productions, 2006–2010)
- The Goon: Noir #3: "The Wisdom of the Goon" (with Arvid Nelson, Dark Horse, 2007)
- New X-Men #44-46: "Messiah Complex" (with Craig Kyle and Christopher Yost, Marvel, 2007–2008)
- Runaways v3 #1-6: "Dead Wrong" (with Terry Moore, Marvel, 2008–2009)
- X-Men: Manifest Destiny #3: "Uncheerable" (with Christopher Yost, Marvel, 2009)
- Avengers: The Initiative #21-25: "Disassembled" (with Christos Gage, Marvel, 2009)
- Hulked Out Heroes #1-2 (with Jeff Parker, Marvel, 2010)
- The Amazing Spider-Man #648-651, 654.1, 667–672, 676, 678–679, 684–685, 692–694, 699–700, 800 FCBD '11 (with Dan Slott, Marvel, 2011–2018)
- The Amazing Spider-Man vol.3 #1-6, 8, 16-18 (with Dan Slott, Marvel, 2014–2015)
- The Amazing Spider-Man vol.5 #1, 6–10, 17–18, 20, 22, 25, 49, 74 (with Nick Spencer, Marvel, 2018–2021)
- The Superior Spider-Man #6-8, 14–16, 22-26 (with Dan Slott, Marvel, 2013)
- Fairy Quest Vol. 1 – Outlaws (Boom! Studios, 2013)
- Fairy Quest Vol. 2 – Outcasts (Boom! Studios, 2015)
- Extraordinary X-Men #1-5, 8-12 (with Jeff Lemire, Marvel, 2016)
- Champions (vol.2) #1-18 (with Mark Waid, Marvel, 2017)
- Strange Academy #1-18 (with Skottie Young, Marvel, 2020–2022)
- The Spectacular Spider-Men #1-7 (with Greg Weisman, Marvel, 2024)

=== Cover work ===
- Hardware #20, 30 (Milestone, 1994–1995)
- Impulse #7, 14–15, 18, 21–22, 85, Annual #1 (DC Comics, 1995–2002)
- Showcase '95 #5 (DC Comics, 1995)
- The Avengers #392 (Marvel, 1995)
- 2099 A.D. Genesis #1 (Marvel, 1996)
- Defcon 4 #1 (Wildstorm, 1996)
- Doom 2099 #41 (Marvel, 1996)
- Fantastic Four 2099 #5 (Marvel, 1996)
- Spider-Man 2099 #43 (Marvel, 1996)
- X-Men 2099 #32 (Marvel, 1996)
- Prime #10-15 (Malibu, 1996)
- Devil Dinosaur Spring Fling #1 (Marvel, 1997)
- Generation X #32 (Marvel, 1997)
- Lugo #5 (Cygnus Comics, 1998)
- Wildcats #1 (Wildstorm, 1999)
- Young Justice 80-Page Giant #1 (DC Comics, 1999)
- Danger Girl #6 (Cliffhanger, 1999)
- Action Comics #762 (DC Comics, 2000)
- Dirty Pair: Run from the Future #4 (Dark Horse, 2000)
- Battle Gods: Warriors of the Chaak #2 (Dark Horse, 2000)
- Steampunk #4 (Cliffhanger, 2000)
- Tellos #8 (Gorilla, 2000)
- Superman Annual #12 (DC Comics, 2000)
- Superman: The Man of Steel #106 (DC Comics, 2000)
- Battle Chasers #7 (Cliffhanger, 2001)
- Silke #2 (Dark Horse, 2001)
- Vampi #7 (Harris, 2001)
- Peter Parker: Spider-Man #30-41 (Marvel, 2001–2002)
- Superman/Tarzan: Sons of the Jungle #1-3 (Dark Horse, 2001–2002)
- Young Justice #44-45 (DC Comics, 2002)
- Robin #101 (DC Comics, 2002)
- Superboy #99 (DC Comics, 2002)
- The Spectacular Spider-Man #19-20 (Marvel, 2004)
- Man with the Screaming Brain #2 (Dark Horse, 2005)
- 100 Girls #5 (Arcana Studio, 2005)
- Abiding Perdition #1 (Markosia, 2005)
- Rex Mundi #18 (Image, 2006)
- Runaways v3 #7-9 (Marvel, 2009)
- Young X-Men #6 (Marvel, 2008)
- X-Men: Manifest Destiny #1-2, 4-5 (Marvel, 2008–2009)
- Captain Britain and MI13 #8 (Marvel, 2009)
- Avengers: The Initiative Featuring Reptil #1 (Marvel, 2009)
- X-Men vs. Agents of Atlas #1-2 (Marvel, 2009–2010)
- Deadpool Team-Up #899-885 (Marvel, 2009–2011)
- Avengers vs. Atlas #1-4 (Marvel, 2010)
- Dragon Age #1-6 (IDW, 2010)
- Wolverine: Origins #47 (Marvel, 2010)
- Heroic Age: Prince of Power #1 (Marvel, 2010)
- Avengers & the Infinity Gauntlet #1 (Marvel, 2010)
- Starborn #1-4 (Boom! Studios, 2010–2011)
- Ultimate Mystery #4 (Marvel, 2010)
- The Amazing Spider-Man #667, 677 (Marvel, 2011–2012)
- Onslaught Unleashed #1-4 (Marvel, 2011)
- Uncanny X-Men #535 (Marvel, 2011)
- Moon Knight #1 (Marvel, 2011)
- Fear Itself #6 (Marvel, 2011)
- X-Men v3 #18 (Marvel, 2011)
- Avenging Spider-Man #1, 3 (Marvel, 2012)
- Carnage U.S.A. #1 (Marvel, 2012)
- Age of Apocalypse #1-2, 4 (Marvel, 2012)
- Fanboys vs. Zombies #1 (Boom! Studios, 2012)
- Hulk #50 (Marvel, 2012)
- Halo: Fall of Reach - Covenant tpb (Marvel, 2012)
- Spider-Men #1 (Marvel, 2012)
- Vitriol the Hunter #3 (IDW, 2013)
- Secret Wars: Spider-Island #1-5 (Marvel, 2015)
- Nova #11 (Marvel, 2016)
- The Amazing Mary Jane #1-5 (Marvel, 2019–2020)

Preceded by Paul Azaceta	The Amazing Spider-Man artist 2011–2012	Succeeded by N/A
Preceded by N/A	The Amazing Spider-Man artist 2014–2015	Succeeded by Giuseppe Camuncoli
