= Testament (comics) =

Comic book series by Douglas Rushkoff

- Cover to Testament #1

Publication information
- Publisher: Vertigo
- Schedule: Monthly
- Format: Ongoing series
- Genre: , historical, science fiction; Mythology
- Publication date: February 2006 – March 2008
- No. of issues: 22

Creative team
- Created by: Douglas Rushkoff; Liam Sharp
- Written by: Douglas Rushkoff
- Penciller(s): Liam Sharp; Peter Gross; Dean Ormston
- Inker(s): Liam Sharp; Gary Erskine; Dean Ormston; Mark Pennington
- Letterer(s): Jared K. Fletcher; Todd Klein
- Colorist(s): Jamie Grant; James Devlin
- Editor(s): Pornsak Pichetshote; Jonathan Vankin; Bob Harras

Collected editions
- Akedah: ISBN 978-1-4012-1063-2
- West of Eden: ISBN 1-4012-1201-8
- Babel: ISBN 1-4012-1496-7
- Exodus: ISBN 1-4012-1811-3

Testament is an American comic book series written by Douglas Rushkoff with art and covers by Liam Sharp. It was published from February 2006 to March 2008 under DC Comics' Vertigo imprint.

== Premise ==
The action alternatives between the near future and the biblical past to illustrate the most prominent theme: that history repeats itself.

== Plot ==
In the near future grad student Jake Stern and his conscientious objector friends fight against the new RFID-based universal draft by attempting to access the collective unconscious through an experimental combination of the hallucinogenic preparation ayahuasca and shared sensory deprivation tank experiences. The near future story is mirrored through the history-repeats-itself idea as biblical narrative based on Torah, various Jewish and Christian apocrypha, and elements of other mythologies. One major departure from Judeo-Christian tradition in Testament is the separation of The One True God into two entities who in the story are represented by the God Elijah, who represents the Abrahamic One True God, and a new entity of the author's invention which he calls The One True God. Much of the action in the story is driven by situations and characters being manipulated by the various gods as they battle for dominion over existence.

=== Story arcs ===
- Abraham of Ur: Issues #1–5
- West of Eden: Issues #6–7
- Down to Egypt: Issues #8–10
- Shit Happens: The Book of Job: Issue #11
- Trip Reset: The Rape of Dinah: Issue #12
- Babel: Issues #13–16
- Blood Brother: Issues #17–18
- Exodus: Issues #19–22

== Characters ==
There are two stories being told, one in the Biblical historical past, the other in the near future.

=== Biblical characters ===
- Abraham, patriarch of the Israelite religion
- Astarte, Semitic goddess of fertility, sexuality, and war
- Isaac, Abraham's son, whom he is called on to sacrifice
- Melchizedek Biblical character who appeared to Abraham, here a deity representing the merciful Abrahamic God
- Moloch, Phoenician god of the sacrifice of young children, here a deity representing the malevolent aspects of the Abrahamic God
- Sarah, Abraham's wife

=== Near-future characters ===
- Jake Stern, graduate student caught in the middle of the conflict over a near future National RFID Trace system
- Alan Stern, Jake's father, a researcher at Brookhaven National Laboratory (Center For Functional Nanomaterials)
- Amos, leader of Jake's rebel friends at the Temple
- Greco, who makes propaganda for the Temple
- Dinah, Jake's underage friend who makes potions for the Temple
- Other unnamed Temple resident who acts as doorman and wears a "Juan Kerr" shirt
- Miriam, Jake's ex-girlfriend and fellow grad student, dedicated to changing the system using above the board methods
- Alan's colleague Dr. Green, who helped develop the RFID system, originally intended to trace soldiers in the field

== Collected editions ==
The series is being collected into a number of trade paperbacks:

#	Title	ISBN	Release date	Collected material
1	Testament: Akedah	ISBN 978-1-4012-1063-2	July 26, 2006	Testament #1–5
2	Testament: West of Eden	ISBN 1-4012-1201-8	January 17, 2007	Testament #6–10
3	Testament: Babel	ISBN 1-4012-1496-7	November 7, 2007	Testament #11–16
4	Testament: Exodus	ISBN 1-4012-1811-3	August 5, 2008	Testament #17–22

== See also ==
- Anakim
- Mount Moriah
- Sodom
- Ur of the Chaldees
