= Liam Sharp =

British comic book artist (born 1968)

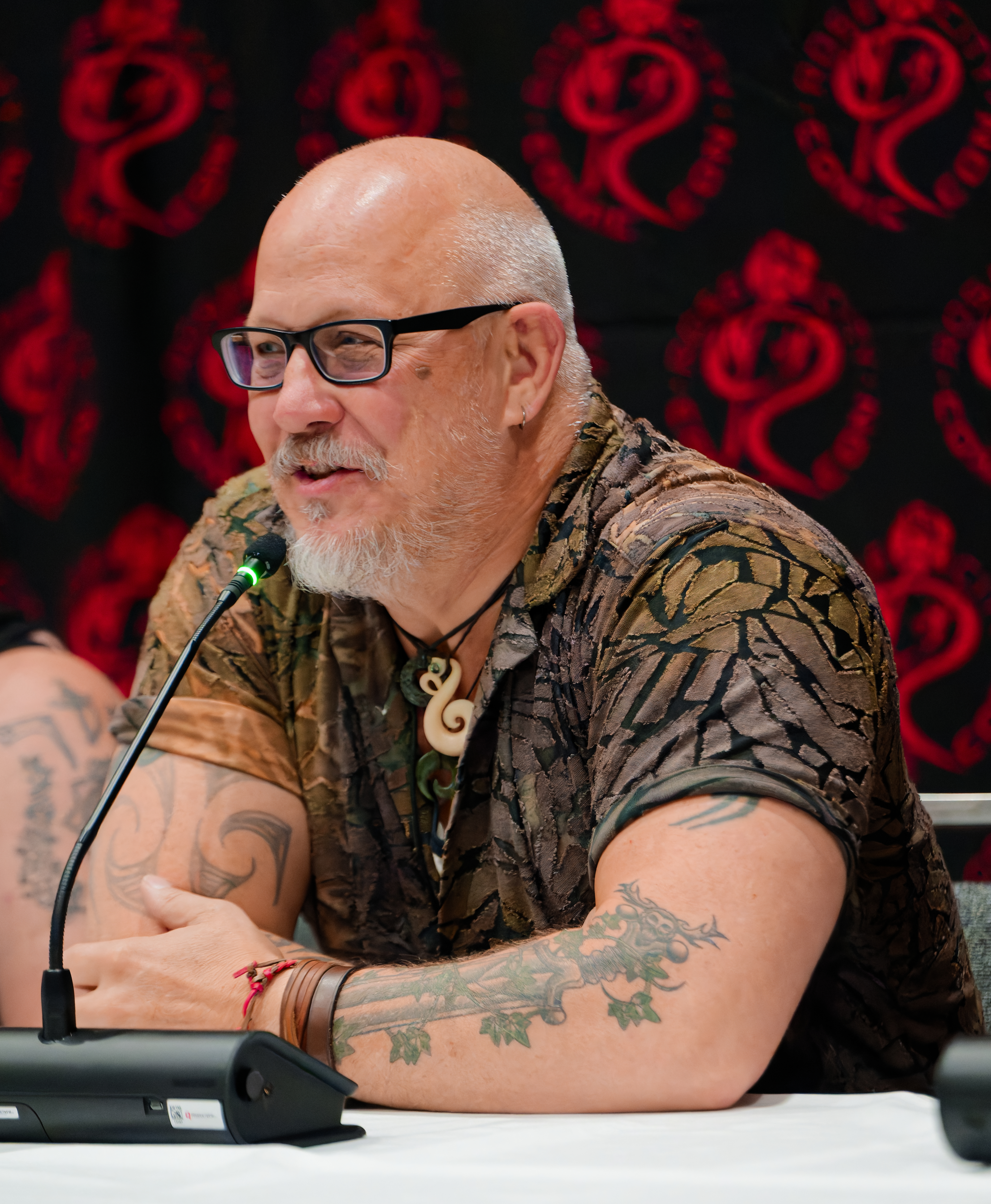
- Liam Sharp at Rose City Comic Con in 2025
- Born: Liam Roger Sharp; 2 May 1968 (age 58) Derby, England, UK
- Areas: Artist, writer, publisher
- Pseudonyms: Liam Roger McCormack-Sharp; Ralph Raims (anagram); Roger M. Cormack
- Notable works: Green Lantern; Wonder Woman; The Brave and the Bold; Death's Head II; Event Horizon; Testament
- Awards: Apple's best of 2012 apps, Madefire, Hidden Gems. Inkwell Awards All-in-One Award, 2018, 2020, 2026

Liam Roger Sharp (born 2 May 1968) is a British comic book artist, writer, publisher, and co-founder/CCO of Madefire Inc.

== Early life ==
Liam Sharp was born in Derby. He attended Eastbourne College.

== Career ==
Sharp made his debut in the 1980s for the science fiction magazine 2000 AD after a year's apprenticeship with Don Lawrence, artist on the Dutch comic Storm. His works included many Judge Dredd stories, the origin of Finn, ABC Warriors series and one of Tharg's Future Shocks. He later moved to Marvel UK, for which he drew the mini-series Death's Head II. Thereafter he began working mainly in the United States on books as diverse as X-Men, Hulk, Spider-Man, Venom, Man-Thing (for Marvel Comics), Superman, Batman for DC Comics, and Spawn: The Dark Ages for Todd McFarlane.

Sharp has also worked on more mature themed books for Verotik, doing GOTH, Jaguar God and Frank Frazetta's "The Death Dealer". He briefly worked on a strip originated by Stan Winston called 'Realm of the Claw'. Later he co-created the Wildstorm series The Possessed with writer Geoff Johns, and a strip for Heavy Metal magazine, entitled "A-crazy-A" featuring Playboy model Tiffany Taylor – for which he provided the art and script. He was also the complete author of the short story "Winter Rose" in the Vampirella magazine.

In 2004 Sharp set up his own publishing company, Mam Tor Publishing, with his wife Christina McCormack, to publish the art book Sharpenings: the Art of Liam Sharp.

After the early success with this, Sharp saw a hole in the comic book market for alternative independent comics, and together with his wife Christina, designer Tom Muller and friend John Bamber set out to expand the company to start publishing more work. This saw the launch of the critically acclaimed and award -winning anthology Mam Tor: Event Horizon. Event Horizon featured art by Glenn Fabry, Brian Holguin, Ashley Wood, Simon Bisley, Alan Grant, Steve Niles, Emma Simcock-Tooth, Ali Powers, Kev Crossley, Lee Carter and Dave Kendall.

Sharp went on to illustrate the controversial and critically well-received DC Vertigo comic Testament written by Douglas Rushkoff, and the Countdown-related title, Lord Havok and The Extremists with writer Frank Tieri. After that he provided art for the biggest selling comic of 2008 in the US, the Wildstorm title based on the video game Gears of War.

Mam Tor and the advertising agency Mother produced a free sixteen page comic given away with Time Out for which Sharp was the art director, as well as providing the art for a story in the first two issues as well as the cover for the first issue.

In September 2008 he signed an exclusive deal with DC.

Sharp wrote the 2011 novel God Killers.

On 9 April 2011 Sharp was one of 62 comics creators who appeared at the IGN stage at the Kapow! convention in London to set two Guinness World Records, the Fastest Production of a Comic Book, and Most Contributors to a Comic Book. With Guinness officials on hand to monitor their progress, writer Mark Millar began work at 9am scripting a 20-page black and white Superior comic book, with Sharp and the other artists appearing on stage throughout the day to work on the pencils, inks, and lettering, including Dave Gibbons, Frank Quitely, John Romita Jr., Jock, Doug Braithwaite, Ian Churchill, Duncan Fegredo, Simon Furman, David Lafuente, John McCrea, Sean Phillips and Liam Sharp, who all drew a panel each, with regular Superior artist Leinil Yu creating the book's front cover. The book was completed in 11 hours, 19 minutes, and 38 seconds, and was published through Icon on 23 November 2011, with all royalties being donated to Yorkhill Children's Foundation.

In 2017 Derby Museum hosted a ten week long retrospective of Sharp's work, spanning his career from 2000ad to Wonder Woman. Sharp was awarded a wrought-Iron and mosaic star in the city's #MadeInDerby2 campaign, which can be found outside the Standing Order pub, near the front door of the house where Joseph Wright lived in Derby's cathedral quarter. He was awarded an Honorary Doctorate by Derby University in 2022.

== Bibliography ==
=== Comics ===
- Tharg's Future Shocks: "Some One is Watching Me" (with Alan McKenzie, in 2000 AD No. 531, 1987)
- Judge Dredd:
  - The Complete PJ Maybe (September 2006, ISBN 1-904265-96-0) collects:
    - "Bug" (with John Wagner/Alan Grant, in 2000 AD No. 534, 1987)
    - "PJ Maybe, Age 13" (with John Wagner, in 2000 AD #592–594, 1988)
    - "The Further Adventures of PJ Maybe" (with John Wagner, in 2000 AD No. 599, 1988)
    - "The Confeshuns of PJ Maybe" (with John Wagner, in 2000 AD #632–634, 1989)
  - "Corporal Punishment" (with John Wagner/Alan Grant, in 2000 AD No. 542, 1987)
  - "Killcraze" (with John Wagner/Alan Grant, in 2000 AD #543–544, 1987)
  - "Skeet and the Wrecking Crew" (with John Wagner/Alan Grant, in 2000 AD #575–576, 1988)
  - "Playaday" (with John Wagner, in 2000 AD No. 642, 1989)
  - "The Confessions of P. J. Maybe, Age 14" (with John Wagner, in 2000 AD #632-634, 1989)
  - "Blaze of Glory" (with John Wagner, in Judge Dredd Megazine #305, 2011)
  - "Dredd Set" (with John Tomlinson, in Judge Dredd Megazine #309, 2011)
- Death's Head No. 6 (pencils, with Simon Furman and inks by Paul Marshall, Marvel UK, 1989, reprinted in The Incomplete Death's Head No. 7, Marvel UK, 1993, collected in Death's Head Volume 1, 204 pages, Panini Comics, February 2007, ISBN 1-905239-34-3)
- Death's Head II (vol. 1) #1–4 (pencils, with Dan Abnett and inks by Bambos Georgiou/Andy Lanning, Marvel UK, 1992)
- Dinosaurs: A Celebration: #2 (Epic Comics/Marvel, 1992, ISBN 0-87135-905-7)
- Death's Head II (vol. 2) #1–5 (pencils (1–4) and inks (5), with Dan Abnett and inks by Rodney Ramos/Andy Lanning, Marvel UK, 1992–1993)
- Bloodseed #1–2 (with Paul Neary, Marvel UK, 1993)
- Bodycount (with various artists, Marvel UK, 1993)
- Avengers Strikefile (with Robert Harras, one-shot, Marvel Comics, 1994)
- Death's Head Gold (script and pencils, Marvel UK)
  - #0: "The Nechromachiad: The Prologue" (with inks by Robin Riggs/Rodney Ramos, reprinted in Death's Head II No. 14, 1994)
  - #1: "The Nechromachiad" (with inks by Andy Lanning/Rodney Ramos, 1994)
- Venom: The Mace (1994) (pencils, with Carl Potts and inks by Bill Reinhold, 3-issue mini-series, Marvel Comics, 1994)
- X-Men Unlimited No. 5 (with John Francis Moore, and inks by Kevin Conrad, Steve Moncuse and Robin Riggs, Marvel, 1994)
- X-Men No. 35 (pencils, with Fabian Nicieza and inks by Robin Riggs, Marvel, 1994)
- "The Double" (with J. M. DeMatteis and inks by Robin Riggs, Marvel Comics, October 1994) in:
  - Web of Spider-Man #117
  - The Amazing Spider-Man #394
  - Spider-Man #51
  - The Spectacular Spider-Man #217
- Finn: "Origins of Finn" (with Pat Mills, in 2000 AD #924–927, 1995)
- Incredible Hulk #425–432 (with Peter David and inks by Robin Riggs, Marvel Comics, 1995)
- Satanika (with various artists, Marvel Comics, 1995)
- Spider-Man: The Jackal Files (with various artists, Marvel Comics, 1995)
- "The Space Between Good and Evil" (with Alan Grant, in Batman Chronicles No. 2, DC Comics, 1995)
- Batman: Shadow of the Bat No. 42 (with Alan Grant, DC Comics, 1995)
- G.O.T.H. (with Glenn Danzig, 3-issue mini-series, Verotik, 1995–1996, tpb, 80 pages, 1996, ISBN 1-885730-44-6)
- Spider-Man: The Lost Years No. 0 (with J. M. DeMatteis, Marvel Comics, 1996, reprinting the four-part supplemental story originally in Web of Spider-Man #117, The Amazing Spider-Man #394, Spider-Man #51, and The Spectacular Spider-Man #217)
- Death Dealer #2–3 (with Glenn Danzig, 4-issue mini-series, Verotik, 1996–1997
- Man-Thing #1–8 (with J. M. DeMatteis, Marvel Comics, 1997–1998)
- "So Near" (with Marv Wolfman, in Shadows and Light (vol. 2) No. 2, Marvel Comics, 1998)
- "Destroyer of Worlds"/"The End of All Things! " (with J. M. DeMatteis, in Strange Tales #1–2, Marvel Comics, 1998)
- Spawn: The Dark Ages #1–14 (with Brian Holguin, Image Comics, 1999–2000)
- Peter Parker Spider-Man Annual '99 (with J. M. DeMatteis, Marvel Comics, 1999)
- Magik (with co-authors Dan Abnett/Andy Lanning, 4-issue mini-series. Marvel Comics, 2000–2001)
- Superman Where Is Thy Sting? (with J. M. DeMatteis, graphic novel, DC Comics, 2001)
- JLA: Riddle of the Beast (with Alan Grant, DC Comics, 2001)
- ABC Warriors:"The Clone Cowboys" (with Pat Mills, in 2000 AD #1237–1239, April 2001, collected in The Third Element, October 2008, ISBN 1-905437-80-3)
- Global Frequency No. 3 (inks, with Warren Ellis, and pencils by Glenn Fabry, Wildstorm, 2003, collected in Planet Ablaze, ISBN 1-4012-0274-8)
- The Possessed (with Kris Grimminger/Geoff Johns, 6-issue mini-series, Cliffhanger, 2003–2004, tpb, 144 pages, 2004, ISBN 1-4012-0292-6)
- "Vampirella/Witchblade: Union of the Damned" (pencils, with Justin Gray, and inks by Jimmy Palmiotti, one-shot, Top Cow, 2004, collected in Vampirella/Witchblade Trilogy, 88 pages ISBN, 0910692904)
- "Winter Rose" (script and art, in Vampirella Comics Magazine No. 10, 2005)
- Firestorm No. 7 (pencils, with Dan Jolley, and inks by Andy Lanning, DC Comics, 2005)
- Event Horizon (#1, May 2005, 140 pages, ISBN 0-9549998-0-0, No. 2, November 2005, 208 pages, ISBN 0-9549998-1-9, Mam Tor Publishing):
  - "Fucking Savages" (art, with writer Steve Niles, in Event Horizon #1–2)
  - "Machivarius Point: Avatar" (script, as Roger M. Cormack, with art by Edmund Bagwell, in Event Horizon #1–2)
  - "The True Adventures of Jed Lightsear, Space Pirate!" (script, as Ralph Raims, with art by Edmund Bagwell, in Event Horizon #1–2)
  - "Necromachia" (script, with art by Lee Carter, in Event Horizon #1–2)
  - "Dustbowl" (script, as Roger M. Cormack, with art by Rob Randle, in Event Horizon #2)
  - "Lap of the Gods" (script and art, in Event Horizon #2)
- "On The Way to the Front" (with China Miéville, in Looking for Jake, 352 pages, Macmillan, pages 213–225, hardback, September 2005, ISBN 1-4050-4830-1, paperback, 2005, ISBN 1-4050-5232-5, Pan, paperback, 2006, ISBN 0-330-43418-7)
- "Red Sonja: One More Day" (with Justin Gray/Jimmy Palmiotti, one-shot, Dynamite Entertainment, 2006)
- Testament #1–5, 8–11, 14–17, 20–24 (with writer Douglas Rushkoff, Vertigo, 2006–2008):
  - Akedah (collects Testament #1–5, July 2006, ISBN 1-4012-1063-5)
  - West of Eden (collects Testament #6–10, January 2007, ISBN 1-4012-1201-8)
  - Babel (collects Testament #11–16, November 2007, ISBN 1-4012-1496-7)
  - Exodus (collects Testament ##17–22, August 2008, ISBN 1-4012-1811-3)
- Countdown Presents: Lord Havok and The Extremists (with writer Frank Tieri, 6-issue limited series, DC Comics, 2007–2008, tpb, September 2008, ISBN 1-4012-1844-X)
- Four Feet From a Rat (with Mother):
  - "The Crane Gods" (in Four Feet From a Rat No. 1, March 2008)
  - "A Pocketful of Posies" (in Four Feet From a Rat No. 2, July 2008)
- Gears of War #1- No. 6 (with writer Joshua Ortega, Wildstorm, December 2008 -ongoing)
- "Captain Stone is Missing..." with Christina McCormack, Madefire, July 2012 -ongoing
- "MONO: The Old Curiosity Shop" with artist Ben Wolstenholme, Madefire, July 2012 -ongoing
- "Sherlock Holmes: The Greek Interpreter" by Arthur Conan Doyle with inker Bill Sienkiewicz, Madefire, July 2013 – ongoing
- "Wonder Woman, Rebirth - The Lies" (DC comics) #1, 3, 5, 7, 9, 11,15 With writer Gregg Rucka, and colourist Laura Martin.
- "Wonder Woman: Rebirth - The Truth" (DC comics) #15, 17, 19, 21, 23, 25 With writer Greg Rucka and colourist Laura Martin.
- "Justice League: Metal tie-in" #32 with writer Rob Venditti
- "The Brave and The Bold: Batman and Wonder Woman" six-issue limited series and hardback collected edition from DC comics. Writer and artist.
- "The Green Lantern - Season 1" #1 - 12 with writer Grant Morrison and colorist Steve Oliff.
- "Green Lantern: Blackstars" #1-3 covers only, with Grant Morrison.
- "The Green Lantern Season Two" #1-12 with Grant Morrison and colorist Steve Oliff(#1-2, 4-9).
- Batman: Reptilian #1-6 (with Garth Ennis, 2021)
- "Batman and Catwoman" (DC comics) issues 7,8 & 9 with Tom King.
- "StarHenge: the Dragon & the Boar" ltd. 6 issue series (Image comics) writer, artist, letterer.
- "X-O Manowar Unleashed!" (Valiant comics) Ltd. 6 issue series. With Becky Cloonan and Michael Conrad.
- "ORE: A StarHenge graphic novella" (Image comics) 60 page one-shot.
- "Spawn: the Dark Ages - The Legend of Erlking Ulegrave" (Image comics) 6 issue ltd. series. Writer, artist.
- "The Wuthering" from 'The Savage Sword of Conan" #8 (Titan/Heroic Signatures) writer/artist.
- "Tattered Wings" from 'The Savage Sword of Conan" #11 (Titan/Heroic Signatures) writer/artist.
- "Encore: the Art of Liam Sharp" Gold, silver and bronze trilogy of hard back art books.
- "The Great Hare After" children's book. Art by Matylda McCormack-Sharp, words Liam Sharp

=== Role-playing games ===
- Conan: Adventures in an Age Undreamed Of (2016, Modiphius Entertainment, inner pages illustrations by Liam Sharp, among others)

=== Books ===
- Sharpenings: the Art of Liam Sharp (art book, 2004)
- God Killers: Machivarius Point and Other Tales http://machivariuspoint.weebly.com/ (novel, 2008, ISBN 0-9549998-6-X)
- God Killers: Machivarius Point and Other Tales second edition, including two new stories and map (novel, 2009, ISBN 978-0-9549998-8-9)
- Paradise Rex Press, Inc. https://www.pspublishing.co.uk/andrew-wilmingots-paradise-rex-press-inc-hardcover-by-liam-sharp-3445-p.asp (novella, 2015, EDITIONS

Unsigned Jacketed Hardcover - ISBN 978-1-848638-47-1 Signed Jacketed Hardcover limited to 100 copies - ISBN 978-1-848638-48-8)

=== Film and television ===
Design work for television and film include:

- Lost in Space, production design
- Batman Beyond, character design
- Small Soldiers, production design

== Notes ==
| Preceded by Gary Frank | The Incredible Hulk artist 1995 | Succeeded by Angel Medina |
