= Cliffhanger (comics) =

Comic book imprint of WildStorm

Cliffhanger was an imprint of WildStorm, publishing creator-owned comic books. It was founded in 1998 by Joe Madureira, J. Scott Campbell and Humberto Ramos, when WildStorm was still part of Image Comics (the studio has since been sold to DC Comics).

The imprint ended in summer of 2004 when it was merged with the Homage Comics line to form the WildStorm Signature Series.

== History ==
The imprint's first release was Campbell's spy series Danger Girl in March 1998, followed by the first issue of Madureira's fantasy series Battle Chasers a month later and Ramos' teen-vampire series Crimson in May.

Ramos' Crimson became the longest running series of the line, going on for 24 issues before its conclusion in February 2001.

In spring 2000, Chris Bachalo and author Joe Kelly created the imprint's fourth title, Steampunk. It was followed by Ramos' second Cliffhanger title, Out There, in May 2001.

While several new miniseries were published by the line through 2002 and 2003, like High Roads by writer Scott Lobdell and artist Leinil Francis Yu, Arrowsmith by Kurt Busiek and Carlos Pacheco, The Possessed by Geoff Johns and Kris Grimminger with art by Liam Sharp and Kamikaze, written by Olallo Rubio with art by Francisco Herrera, the imprint lost most of its initial charm and star-power when its founders stopped their titles.

In late 2003, the imprint was also used to publish Epicurus the Sage and The Maxx trade paperbacks with material previously published by Image Comics, before it was finally merged with Homage Comics in 2004 to form the WildStorm Signature Series.
