= The Possessed (comics) =

Publication information
- Publisher: Cliffhanger (WildStorm)
- Schedule: Monthly
- Format: Limited series
- Genre: Horror
- Publication date: September 2003 - March 2004
- No. of issues: 6

Creative team
- Written by: Geoff Johns; Kris Grimminger
- Artist: Liam Sharp

Collected editions
- The Possessed: ISBN 1-4012-0292-6

The Possessed is a six-issue American comic book limited series published in late 2003 and early 2004 by WildStorm, an imprint of DC Comics. The series was published under WildStorm's internal imprint Cliffhanger.

The series followed a fictional team of exorcists sponsored by the Vatican. Each member has a history with demonic possession.

It was co-written by Geoff Johns and Kris Grimminger, with artwork provided by Liam Sharp.

== Characters ==
- Christian Pierce is the team's leader and the son of two wealthy lawyers who was possessed at age ten. He is driven in his need to stop demonic activity and hides a dark secret about his possession.
- Holly is Christian's lover. She was possessed at age nine for a total of three months. The experience drove her mother insane.
- Walt is Holly's father. The intensity of his daughter's possession caused Walt to run away, abandoning his wife and child. Years later at his wife's funeral he saw Holly and realized his mistake. He joined the team in an effort to make up for lost time.
- Katherine "Trix" Taylor is the least experienced member of the team. Possessed just two years previously, for a total of two weeks, Trix is driven by anger and a need for revenge.
- Derek Burroughs is the team's priest. Burroughs was possessed at age seven and the experience wiped his memory clean. He states at one point that his first memory is wiping the blood from his eyes and seeing his father's dead body. In the wake of this Burroughs became very religious and eventually joined the priesthood.

== Plot synopsis ==
=== Issue #1 ===
The team is introduced as they fight to save a young girl named Mandy from possession. After the battle Christian examines a mysterious symbol on two pieces of paper: one has the symbol surrounded by three rings and the other by two.

=== Issue #2 ===
A young boy is possessed at a wedding reception and the team is called in. Before the battle Christian intentionally fails to take his prescribed injection of holy water—the team's means of protection against possession. During the battle, the demon they are fighting possesses Christian who then disappears.

=== Issue #3 ===
In the wake of Christian's disappearance, the team tries to figure out his motives. Many more pieces of paper with the symbol from issue #1 are found, each with one less ring. Holly reveals that the same symbol is carved, in numerous places into Christian's chest. Burroughs deduces that it may be a countdown of some sort.

Christian's whereabouts are revealed as he arrives in the small town of Iron Wood, Michigan. Once there he journeys to the house of a girl named Sierra Waggoner, who is possessed. There the demon possessing him leaves his body after saying "I have delivered him to you".

The rest of the team receives a call from the priest in Iron Wood and journeys there themselves. They arrive to find the entire town under demonic possession.

=== Issue #4 ===
This issue opens as the team battles the possessed parishioners of the Holy Trinity Catholic Church. After they drive their enemies away, the team ties up and has a conversation with the demon possessing the corpse of the church's priest. This conversation reveals the demonic plans underway in Iron Wood.

Now knowing what they face the team goes into action. Trix is left to guard the demon possessed priest, while the rest of the team searches for Christian. Holly decides to break off on her own and encounters a hoard of possessed towns folk who overwhelm her. She is rescued by Michael Waggoner, the father of Sierra Waggoner.

This issue ends with Burroughs realizing that Satan himself is in Iron Wood and is likely the demon possessing Christian.

=== Issue #5 ===
Burroughs and Walt find themselves in the local public school battling the possessed student body. Back in the Holy Trinity Catholic Church, the dead priest escapes opening the church and Trix to a new attack. While her allies are fighting for their lives Holly has a conversation with Michael Waggoner about Christian and suddenly realizes Christian's plan.

The Symbols carved into Christian's chest serve as a means of holding Satan inside Christian's body even after death, effectively killing Satan along with the host body.

The team members come together in front of the Holy Trinity Catholic Church, as the Satan possessed Christian comes out to meet with them.

=== Issue #6 ===
The church is destroyed to start this issue as the team members engage the demon possessed towns folk of Iron Wood in final battle.

== Collected editions ==
The series has been collected as a trade paperback:

- The Possessed (144 pages, 2004, ISBN 1-4012-0292-6)
