= Francisco Haghenbeck =

Mexican screenwriter and writer (1965–2021)

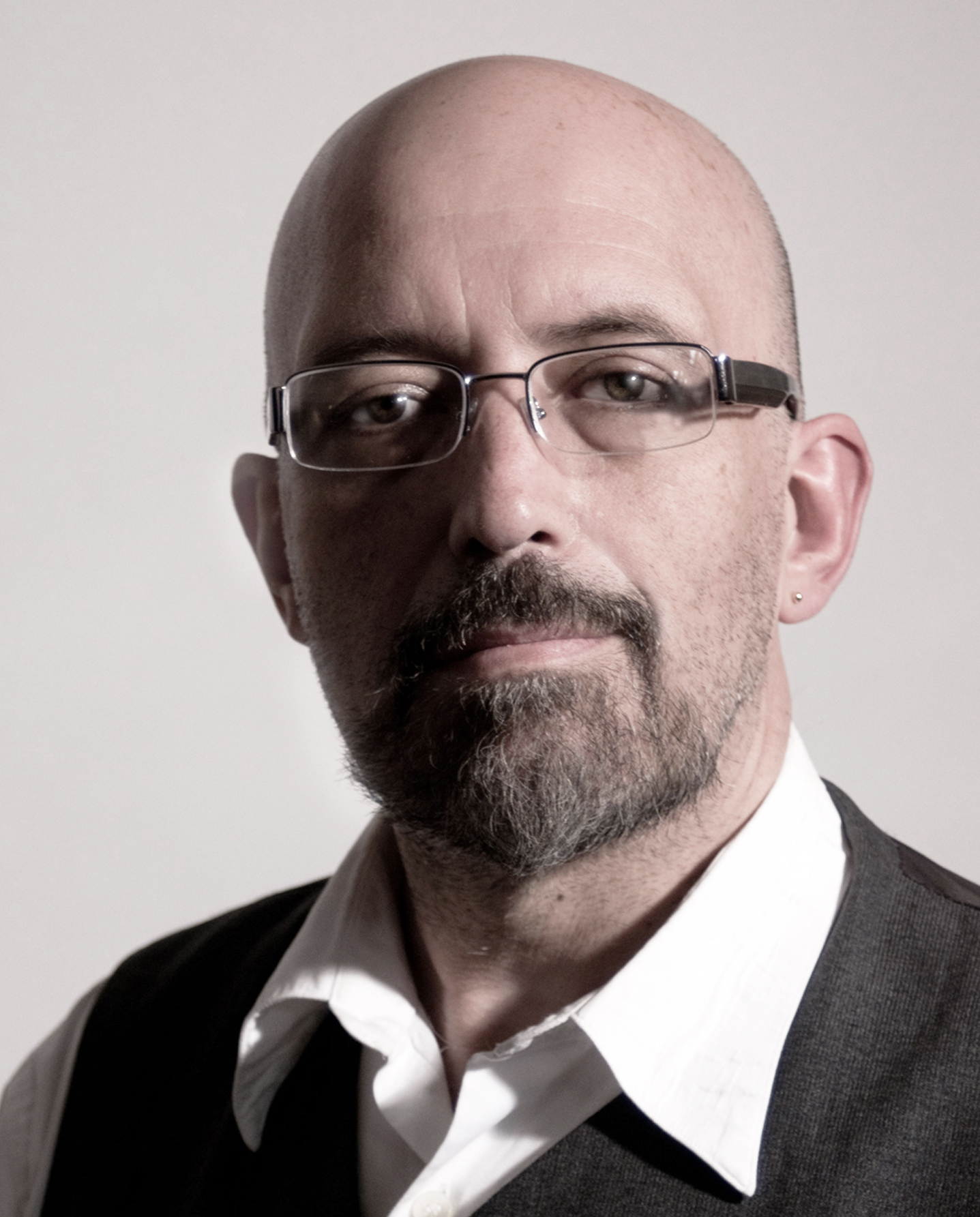
Francisco Haghenbeck

Francisco Haghenbeck (1965 – 4 April 2021) was a Mexican writer and comics screenwriter.

== Biography ==
Francisco Gerardo Haghenbeck Correa was born in 1965, in Mexico City. He studied Architecture at La Salle University and worked in museums, and later as a creative and producer. His work has been translated into several languages, including Mandarin Chinese.

He died due to COVID-19 in Tehuacán on 4 April 2021, during the COVID-19 pandemic in Mexico.
