= Crisse =

Belgian comics artist

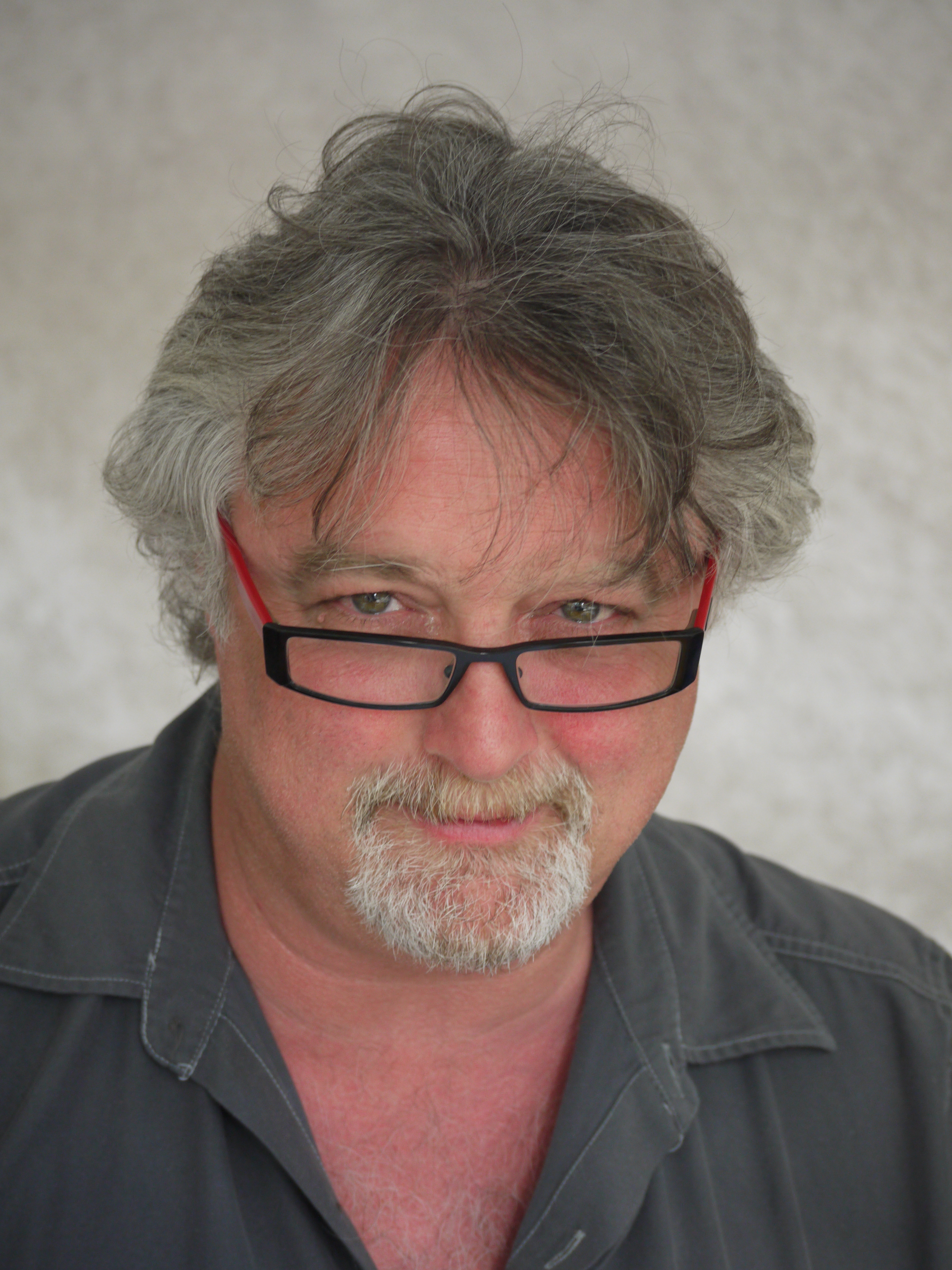

Didier Chrispeels (born 26 February 1958), better known as Crisse, is a Belgian comic-strip artist from Brussels.
