= WildC.A.T.s/X-Men =

Comic book miniseries crossover

- WildC.A.T.s/X-Men TPB cover by Jim Lee.

Publication information
- Publisher: Wildstorm, Image Comics, Marvel Comics
- Format: Mini-series
- Publication date: 1997, 1998
- No. of issues: 4
- Main character(s): WildC.A.T.s, X-Men

Creative team
- Written by: Scott Lobdell, James Robinson, Warren Ellis
- Artist: Travis Charest
- Penciller(s): Jim Lee, Adam Hughes, Mat Broome
- Inker(s): Scott Williams, Sal Regla et al.
- Colorist(s): Wildstorm FX, Joe Chiodo et al.

WildC.A.T.s/X-Men was a crossover event by Image Comics (from Jim Lee's WildStorm) and Marvel Comics in 1997 and 1998 that featured WildStorm's WildC.A.T.s meeting Marvel's X-Men. Originally released in four individual comics, each representing a different "age," the series was later collected by Image Comics/WildStorm as a trade paperback (ISBN 1-58240-022-9) in December 1998.

== Story arcs ==
The four stories all occur in a continuity which appears to follow Earth's history as defined by the Marvel Universe but also contains events central to the Wildstorm universe.

=== The Golden Age ===
Story: Scott Lobdell
Art: Travis Charest with Homage Studios
Computer Colors: Wildstorm FX
Letters: Richard Starkings & Comicraft's Dave Lanphear
Editor: Mike Heisler
Consulting Editor: Bob Harras
Originally published as WildC.A.T.s/X-Men: The Golden Age #1 in February 1997

Set in Nazi Germany, this story revolves around Logan and Zannah, who are independently working to recover an ancient artifact called the Lazarus Scroll from a group of Nazis who have allied with the Daemonites. After their initial solo attempts fail, the two reluctantly team up and manage to recover the Scroll; during this fight, one of the Nazis transforms into a Daemonite and attacks Logan. Zannah kills the Daemonite, then knocks Logan unconscious and takes the Scroll. Later, the two meet again when Logan assists Zannah in securing passage on a train in Vienna. Logan persuades Zannah to trust him, and she fills him in on what the Scroll is. Their travel is interrupted by a Daemonite and Kenyan, who injures Zannah, sabotages the train tracks, and makes off with the Scroll. Surviving the train wreck, Logan and Zannah rest and recuperate, then sneak into a convoy truck, which brings them to an underground base where Kenyan uses the Scroll to resurrect Ebron, an ancient Daemonite warlord. While Logan fights Kenyan, Zannah kills Ebron, which causes a massive explosion that levels the base. Logan digs his way out of the rubble, but can find no trace of Zannah except for her broken sword.

=== The Silver Age ===
Story: Scott Lobdell
Pencils: Jim Lee
Inks: Scott Williams and Sal Regla
Colors: Joe Chiodo & Martin Jiminez
Letters: Richard Starkings & Comicraft's Dave Lanphear
Editor: Scott Dunbier
Consulting Editor: Bob Harras
Originally published as WildC.A.T.s/X-Men: The Silver Age #1 in June 1997

This story takes place in the early days of the original X-Men and before the formation of the WildC.A.T.s. After being released from a South American prison by Nick Fury, Cole Cash is drafted by S.H.I.E.L.D. to work as a field agent to investigate what appears to be an "alien invasion" and to recover an operative who has been captured in Sydney. At the same time, Jean Grey, on a flight to a modeling shoot in Sydney, is psionically accosted by the "aliens," who reveal themselves to be hybrids of the Brood and the Daemonites and who mistake Jean for a S.H.I.E.L.D. agent on the plane who has knowledge of a plot involving the hybrids. The hybrids kill the agent after the plane lands, but are themselves killed by a psionic blast from Cash. Jean telepathically learns the fallen agent's information before he dies, calms Cash after his psi-blast, helps him get past the police at the airport, and offers to help him complete his mission. The news of the attack at the airport is reported by the human/Kherubim halfbreed assassin Pike to Mister Sinister, who is revealed to have created the hybrids and who has captured Zealot, the missing S.H.I.E.L.D operative. Cash and Jean infiltrate a cruise ship which is attacked by Pike and a swarm of hybrids, who capture the passengers so that Sinister can use them to incubate new hybrids. Cash and Jean resist, but are defeated by Pike; however, the rest of the X-Men arrive (having tracked Jean using Cerebro) and defeat Pike and the rest of the hybrids. Sinister escapes, unnoticed by anyone; Zealot is freed, and Jean and Cash part company.

=== The Modern Age ===
Story: James Robinson
Pencils: Adam Hughes
Inks: Mark Farmer
Colors: Joe Chiodo & Martin Jiminez
Letters: Richard Starkings & Comicraft's Dave Lanphear
Editor: Scott Dunbier
Consulting Editor: Bob Harras
Originally published as WildC.A.T.s/X-Men: The Modern Age #1 in August 1997

This story takes place after the formation of the second X-Men team and the WildC.A.T.s, but before the Dark Phoenix Saga. The X-Men are investigating the disappearance of a young mutant boy which appears to be connected to a British branch of the Hellfire Club. At the same time, the WildC.A.T.s are investigating a suspected allegiance between this branch of the Club and the Daemonites. During a reconnaissance mission at the mansion, Nightcrawler is assaulted by Warblade, who mistakes the X-Man for a Daemonite. They are accosted by Hellfire Club minions; one exposes itself as a Daemonite and attacks Warblade, who kills the entire group then is teleported away. Two months later, as the X-Men plan to sneak into the Club to investigate further, Lord Emp receives and accepts an invitation for Jacob Marlowe to join the Club, and takes Spartan and Voodoo with him; they are accepted into the Club, but are later ambushed and incapacitated. The other WildC.A.T.s and the X-Men converge on the Club's mansion and battle combined Club and Daemonite forces, and eventually discover Emp and the missing mutant boy deep underground, where they are to be sacrificed to a demonic creature which is summoned by the Club's leader. A vicious battle ensues, and Emp and the boy are freed. With its sacrifices taken away, the creature is unsummoned, and the resulting energy vortex destroys the Club's mansion. Jean and Void save the two teams from the rubble, and the remaining Club and Daemonite forces are defeated. The two teams part on less than friendly terms, as the X-Men (even Wolverine) are disturbed by the WildC.A.T.s' lethal tactics and merciless attitude about killing.

=== The Dark Age ===
Story: Warren Ellis
Pencils: Mat Broome
Inks: Sean Parsons
Colors: Wendy Fouts & Wildstorm FX
Letters: Richard Starkings & Comicraft's Dave Lanphear
Editor: Scott Dunbier
Consulting Editor: Bob Harras
Originally published as X-Men/WildC.A.T.s: The Dark Age #1 in May 1998

This story takes place in Manhattan in 2019. North America is a wasteland ruled by the Daemonites. It is revealed that the Daemonites on Earth went insane in anger and grief after learning that their homeworld had been conquered by the Kherubim. Still intent on conquering Earth, they stole Sentinel technology from the US government and fused the technology with themselves, turning themselves into monstrous cyborgs who easily overpowered the combined human/superhuman/Kherubim forces which tried to stop them. By the time of the story's beginning, most of the Marvel Universe superheroes have either been killed or imprisoned, along with several Wildstorm superheroes. Of the surviving superheroes, Savant, Voodoo, Zealot, Lord Emp, Mister Majestic, Warblade, Storm, Kitty Pryde, Jean Grey, and Cable are all prisoners of the Daemonites. Zealot, Cable, Jean, and Majestic are segregated from the rest, subdued, and subjected to near-constant torture. The rest are held in holding areas patrolled by Daemonite guards. Emp needs to use a wheelchair, and Storm is mildly deranged due to a severe attack of claustrophobia caused by being buried in a pile of corpses. All of them have had their powers shut off by living implants in their bodies, and those who are physically able are forced to perform horrific, demoralizing tasks such as examining corpses.

Grifter and Wolverine, who have survived the Daemonite takeover and are members of a resistance army, are shown making their way across the country from Canada to Manhattan to set off a nuclear bomb. After finding the corpse of Grunge, they encounter and defeat members of DV8 who have been conscripted by the Daemonites as border guards. While this is going on, a plan put together by Kitty and Emp is put into motion. Warblade sacrifices himself by having Emp kill his implant; before he dies, he uses his power to surgically shut down and remove the others' implants. Savant, Storm, Kitty, and Voodoo then free Zealot, Cable, Jean, and Mister Majestic from captivity, and the final stage of the plan is put into motion: to erase the current timeline by going back in time and ensuring that the Kherubim do not reach Earth. This will keep the Daemonites from following the Kherubim to Earth, and will also eliminate the X-Men, which will take away the need to develop the Sentinels. Using the time travel knowledge in Cable's mind, Jean psionically links herself, Cable, Emp, and Savant, and begins the process, but lacks the power needed to complete the task. The bomb planted by Grifter and Wolverine detonates, providing the energy that Jean lacks, and the psionically merged foursome destroy a Kherubim ship on the verge of reaching Earth. As the current timeline is erased, single panel scenes from each of the four stories are shown being destroyed. In the last panels, a young girl resembling Savant and a man resembling Logan are shown walking together outside a mansion resembling the X-Mansion.
