= Wildstorm Rising =

1995 comic book crossover

- Cover of Wildstorm Rising (1996), trade paperback collected edition, art by Barry Windsor-Smith
- Publisher: WildStorm
- Publication date: May – Jun 1995
- Genre: Superhero; Crossover
Title(s)
Backlash #8
Deathblow vol. 1, #16
Gen^{13} vol. 2, #2
Grifter #1
Stormwatch vol. 1, #22
Team 7: Objective: Hell #1
Union vol. 2, #4
Wetworks #8
WildC.A.T.s vol. 1, #20
Wildstorm Rising #1-2
- Main character(s): WildC.A.T.s, Stormwatch
- Wildstorm Rising: ISBN 1-56389-588-9

"Wildstorm Rising" was a crossover event published by Image Comics and WildStorm that involved the entire line of titles published by WildStorm in 1995.

== Publication history ==
The 10-part crossover was published as a two-issue comic book limited series Wildstorm Rising that served as bookends of the story arc (cover dated May 1995-June 1995) while also running through these specific WildStorm titles. The chapters are as following:

- Prologue: Team 7: Objective: Hell (Team 7 vol. 2) #1
- Chapter 1: Wildstorm Rising #1
- Chapter 2: WildC.A.T.s vol.1, #20
- Chapter 3: Union vol.2, #4
- Chapter 4: Gen^{13} vol.2, #2
- Chapter 5: Grifter vol.1, #1
- Chapter 6: Deathblow vol.1, #16
- Chapter 7: Wetworks #8
- Chapter 8: Backlash #8
- Chapter 9: Stormwatch vol.1, #22
- Chapter 10: Wildstorm Rising #2

== Creators ==
Various comic book writers and artists who worked on this crossover event included: Jim Lee, Travis Charest, Ron Marz, Kevin Maguire and Barry Windsor-Smith (who co-wrote & illustrated Wildstorm Rising # 1, and illustrated all of the covers to tie-in issues).

Windsor-Smith later said that he was talked into illustrating Wildstorm Rising, and regretted participating it. He related that in reading the story and illustrating it, he could not understand the motivations of any of the characters, even when he read earlier Wildstorm books featuring the characters. He says he "mucked with the plot awfully" in order to improve it and his enthusiasm for it, saying, "After intense thinking, I realized what I was doing wrong: I was looking for characters! I know this sounds really glib as if I'm trying to build up to a funny line. But I’m really not. That was my problem: I was looking for characterization, and there was none. 'There is no characterization! That's what you’re doing wrong here, Barry!' They’re all ciphers!" Windsor-Smith later learned that writer James Robinson was not pleased with Windsor-Smith's alterations to the plot.

== Plot ==
Stormwatch and WildC.A.T.S teams end up at odds but have to stop fighting long enough to stop Helspont and Defile from collecting all the keys to unlock the Daemonite ship which could destroy Earth, a ship buried on Earth for centuries.

== Collection ==
This crossover was later collected as the trade paperback Wildstorm Rising (272 pages, Image Comics, June 1996, ISBN 1-887279-23-7, WildStorm, December 1998, ISBN 1-56389-588-9)
