= Warblade (comics) =

- Cover of the first issue

Publication information
- Publisher: Wildstorm Comics (Image Comics, later DC Comics)
- First appearance: WildC.A.T.s #1 (August 1992)
- Created by: Brandon Choi, Jim Lee

In-story information
- Alter ego: Reno Bryce
- Species: Human/Kherubim hybrid
- Team affiliations: WildC.A.T.s
- Abilities: Bio-metal manipulation; Combat experience; Artistry proficiency

Warblade (Reno Bryce) is a comic book character from DC Comics and Wildstorm.

== Publication history ==
Warblade starred in two of his own miniseries, Warblade: Endangered Species in 1995 and The Razors Edge: Warblade in 2004–2005.

== Fictional character biography ==
Warblade is the special codename picked by Reno Bryce, a long-green-haired artist. In his youth, Reno's parents were killed by the alien Daemonites. Reno survived and swore vengeance against them, dedicating his life to martial arts to avenge them.

He was kidnapped by the organization known as Cyberdata, brainwashed and transformed into a member of their strike team, the S.H.O.C.s. His teammate Misery used her powers to make him think that he was in love with her but quickly changed the focus of her manipulations to Ripclaw. She was revealed to be a traitor and Warblade killed her. After this, Ripclaw attacked Reno, thinking that he was the traitor, as well as for his feelings for Misery, and almost killed him.

Reno was found bleeding in Gamorra by Jacob Marlowe. He was saved by Jacob and joined his Daemonite hunting team, the WildC.A.T.s. Like many of the Wild C.A.T.s, Reno turned out to be half human and half Kherubim, a race of aliens that had fought the Daemonites for millennia.

Warblade met Ripclaw (at this time a member of the Cyberforce) again and after quite some fighting between their teams and the two men themselves, Ripclaw finally saw through all the lies and deception upon Misery's defeat and realized that it was Misery who was the traitor. After the realization that Warblade had not been lying at all, and had been trying to help him the entire time, they became friends and allies.

During his time with the Wild C.A.T.s, Reno fought Pike, a half-human, half-Kherubim assassin. During a Native American ritual, Pike had taken the drug peyote and had a vision of himself killing a Wild C.A.T.s member, a goal he would dedicate the rest of his life to. Their first fight ended indecisive.

Reno went with the Wild C.A.T.s to Khera, home of the Kherubim, where he met other shapeshifters like himself. He became an apprentice to the ancient shapeshifter Lord Proteus at the Shaper's Guild and learned many new ways to use his powers. He was disappointed when fellow Wild C.A.T.s members Voodoo and Spartan uncovered the darker side of Kheran society. The Wild C.A.T.s left Khera soon afterward and returned home.

Back home, Reno stayed with the team and began a relationship with Jules, Emp's assistant. Soon afterwards the team disbanded following the apparent death of their teammate Zealot.

Reno retired and focused on his art. Pike had not forgotten his vision though. He attempted to kill Warblade and managed to disperse Warblade's molecules with an explosion that also killed Reno's girlfriend, Jules. Reno was able to regenerate his body and wanted revenge. He tracked Pike to Sarajevo, where they fought again. This time Warblade won and he killed Pike and added the final insult to the dying Pike: even if Pike had killed Warblade, he would have failed his quest, because the Wild C.A.T.s had been disbanded for months.

Afterwards he fell into a state of depression, that eventually led to the loss of his powers and his hands. After a little soul searching, some violent confrontations that almost led to his death, and an experimental drug given to him by the scientist responsible for suppressing his alien genes, he regained his powers.

Reno returned to New York City and retired as a superhero. He became a full-time artist again, though he still met up with his teammate Grifter from time to time. He was forced to use his powers again during one of his expositions, when the Kherubim Brotherhood of the Sword turned a large part of New York's population into bloodthirsty creatures.

He appeared briefly during the Captain Atom: Armageddon storyline, before the Void entity Nikola Hanssen rebooted the Wildstorm Universe into WorldStorm.

=== WildCats vol. 4 ===
Warblade is one of the several WildCats that Hadrian has managed to recruit; under the black-ops codename of "Cutlery Kid", he is deep in Kaizen Gamorra's extraterrestrial colony, providing intelligence back to Spartan on Earth.

=== The New 52 ===
Warblade had a role in the series, The Ravagers as Rose Wilson's partner. Warblade is one of the chief members of the Ravagers, the personal army for N.O.W.H.E.R.E. As such, he follows the orders of Harvest, the founder of N.O.W.H.E.R.E. During the Culling, Warblade was among the members of the Ravagers that tested the survivors of the kill-or-be-killed tournament. During the altercation, several test subjects of the Colony escaped. Warblade is tasked with tracking down some of the escapees, during which he is killed by Deathstroke. Warblade is resurrected following the DC Rebirth and Infinite Frontier relaunches.

== In other media ==
- Warblade appears in Wild C.A.T.s (1994), voiced by Dean McDermott.
- A Warblade figure from Playmates Toys was released in 1994.
