= Wild C.A.T.s =

- DVD release cover
- Also known as: Jim Lee's Wild C.A.T.S: Covert Action Teams
- Genre: Superhero; Action; Adventure; Science fiction
- Based on: Wild C.A.T.s by: Jim Lee; Brandon Choi
- Developed by: Bob Forward; David Wise
- Written by: David Wise; Brooks Wachtel; Rich Fogel; Mark Seidenberg
- Directed by: Bob Smith
- Voices of: Rod Wilson; Roscoe Handford; Colin O'Meara; Ruth Marshall; Dean McDermott; Paul Mota; Sean McCann; Janet-Laine Green; Maurice Dean Wint
- Opening theme: "Wild C.A.T.s" by Sheree Jeacocke and Gerry Mosby
- Countries of origin: United States; Canada
- Original language: English
- No. of seasons: 1
- No. of episodes: 13

Production
- Executive producers: Jim Lee; Michael Hirsh; Toper Taylor
- Producer: Hasmi Giakoumis
- Running time: 22 minutes
- Production companies: WildStorm Productions; Nelvana

Original release
- Network: CBS
- Release: October 1, 1994 – January 21, 1995

Wild C.A.T.S is a half-hour animated television series based on the comics series of the same name and developed for television by David Wise. It aired on CBS for one season from October 1, 1994, to January 21, 1995. The series was co-produced by WildStorm Productions & Nelvana.

== Overview ==
When the evil Daemonites emerge from the shadows, multi-billionaire Jacob Marlowe assembles the Wild C.A.T.s, a team of warriors who are descendants of the heroic Kherubim race.

== Production ==
Jim Lee's talent agency, Creative Artists Agency, suggested Lee consider adapting some of his characters to animated series due to the success of X-Men: The Animated Series creating a demand for superhero across the networks. CAA set up a meeting between Lee and Canadian animation studio Nelvana, with Lee pitching Wild C.A.T.s to the studio with Nelvana showing Lee their work on Cadillacs and Dinosaurs which sold Lee on working with the studio on the series. Lee and Nelvana pitched Wild C.A.T.s to CBS who were receptive to the series and put the show into development.

CBS had also acquired options on Savage Dragon, Freak Force, and Youngblood with CBS eventually passing on Freak Force with the intention of creating a 90-minute block of animated series based on Image Comics' characters to compete against the successful X-Men: The Animated Series on Fox Kids. Wild C.A.T.s was eventually picked up to series while CBS passed on Savage Dragon and experienced a contentious fallout with Youngblood creator Rob Liefeld over content changes mandated by the network which Liefeld refused to entertain.

Wild C.A.T.S, along with Teenage Mutant Ninja Turtles and Skeleton Warriors, was grouped into the "Action Zone" showcase that used a wraparound animated fly-though pre-credit sequence to bookend the three very different programs. In March 1995, CBS announced that Wild C.A.T.S would not be returning for a second season.

The series was canceled around the same time that the "Action Zone" concept was officially retired (although TMNT retained the "Action Zone" credit sequence until the end of its run two years later). Following its cancellation, Wild C.A.T.s was picked up by USA Network and was aired as part of the USA Action Extreme Team block from 1995 to 1996.

The Wild C.A.T.s were composed of the original roster from the comic series. The major villain was Helspont, and the Troika and the Coda were featured as supporting characters. Mr. Majestic also made appearances, though not as a member of the group.

The series featured a rock soundtrack, with the theme song performed by Sheree Jeacocke and Gerry Mosby.

== Cast ==
- Rod Wilson as Hadrian-7/Spartan and Majestyk
- Roscoe Handford as Lady Zannah / Zealot
- Colin O'Meara as Cole Cash / Grifter
- Ruth Marshall as Priscilla Kitaen / Voodoo
- Dean McDermott as Reno Bryce / Warblade
- Paul Mota as Jeremy Stone / Maul
- Sean McCann as Jacob Marlowe
- Janet-Laine Green as Void and Karyn McKee
- Maurice Dean Wint as Helspont
- Colin Fox as Pike and Archer Armerment
- Dave Nichols as Attica
- Addison Bell as Slag
- Dan Hennessey as H.A.R.M.
- Denis Akiyama as Dockwell
- Elizabeth Hanna as Artemis
- Kristina Nicoll as Providence
- Lorne Kennedy as Karillion
- Jim Millington as Zachary Forbes
- Bob Zidel as Professor Stone
- David Hemblen as Commander

== Episodes ==
No.	Title	Written by	Original release date
1	"Dark Blade Falling"	David Wise	October 1, 1994
Computer expert and martial artist Reno Bryce is ambushed by Daemonite agents, but is saved by the Wild C.A.T.s, who reveal that he is a descendant of the Kherubim. When his true form is unveiled as Warblade, Bryce runs away, only to be captured and possessed by the Daemonites.
2	"Heart of Steel"	David Wise	October 8, 1994
After the Wild C.A.T.s stop the Troika from stealing top-secret data from Infidyne Corporation, Spartan reunites with Karyn, an Infidyne employee who was his old flame when he was still human. Karyn offers Spartan a second chance in life by regenerating his human body, but he is torn between his love for her and his duty as the team leader.
3	"Cry of the Coda"	Brooks Wachtel	October 15, 1994
The Eastern European nation of Yurgovia threatens its neighbors with a weapon that generates earthquakes, and Helspont wants it for his quest to find the Orb. Marlowe sends the Wild C.A.T.s to Yurgovia to destroy the weapon, but Zealot discovers that her former pupil Artemis has turned the Coda into mercenaries working with the Daemonites.
4	"The Evil Within"	Len Uhley	October 29, 1994
In order to take control of a spy satellite to help him locate the Orb, Helspont has the President of the United States possessed by a Daemonite. Meanwhile, after a falling out with Zealot, Voodoo goes AWOL and is led to believe that her parents are still alive and looking for her.
5	"The Big Takedown"	Bob Forward & David Wise	November 12, 1994
Following a breach at a Halo Enterprises lab by the Troika, Grifter brings in his former pupil Lonely to help improve the security system of Marlowe's company. When Void notices that Lonely has been tagged with a Daemonite tracking dart, the Wild C.A.T.s stage a contingency plan during Lonely's security breach test to prevent the Troika from stealing a powerful x-ray lens, but Lonely reveals his ulterior motive to Grifter.
6	"Lives in the Balance"	Rich Fogel & Mark Seidenberg	November 19, 1994
After wandering through space for thousands of years, the ancient Kherubim leader Majestyk awakens when his stasis pod crashes on Earth. He reveals to the Wild C.A.T.s that Helspont is after the Orb, but while Spartan's team is sent to Holland to foil a Troika diamond heist and Majestyk and Zealot teleport to Maryland to retrieve the quantum generator, Marlowe suspects Majestyk is hiding something inside the stasis pod.
7	"Soul of a Giant"	Bob Forward & Sean Catherine Derek	November 26, 1994
Helspont hires an archaeologist to search for an ancient tablet that contains clues leading to the Orb. Maul discovers that the archaeologist is none other than his father, who he has not seen since his transformation.
8	"Betrayed"	Bob Forward & Brooks Wachtel	December 3, 1994
During an attack at Halo Enterprises' headquarters, Marlowe is blasted with a Daemonite psionic transmitter. Warblade leaves to participate in a martial arts tournament in Japan, but when Helspont takes control of Marlowe's mind and jeopardizes the Wild C.A.T.s' mission in the Himalayas, he must decide between winning the trophy and saving his teammates.
9	"Black Razor's Edge"	Bob Forward	December 10, 1994
Helspont locates the Orb, but in order to reach it, he plans to steal the U.S. government's new anti-missile laser. He also has the government's covert security team Black Razor track down and destroy the Wild C.A.T.s. Leading Black Razor is Max Cash, Grifter's estranged elder brother.
10	"And Then There Were None"	Bob Forward	December 17, 1994
The Daemonites locate and unearth the temple containing the Orb. The Wild C.A.T.s arrive at the temple to stop Helspont from reaching the Orb, but all but Voodoo fall into the temple's traps. Being the least experienced member of the team, she must fend off against Helspont while finding a way to free her teammates.
11	"M.V.P."	Bob Forward	January 7, 1995
Helspont has the Wild C.A.T.s framed for attacking the President on national TV and arrested by the Black Razor. He also steals two nuclear missiles to blast out the temple containing the Orb and destroy the Wild C.A.T.s at Fort Knox, but Marlowe uses his financial power to foil his plans.
12	"The End Game, Part One"	Rich Fogel & Mark Seidenberg	January 14, 1995
While the Wild C.A.T.s prevent the Daemonites from stealing an anti-gravity device at a NASA research facility, Grifter is hit by a stasis cannon by a possessed Lonely. Zealot pursues Lonely across the city to avenge her comatose lover while the rest of the team sends the device to a more secure location, unaware that it is an elaborate trap set by Helspont.
13	"The End Game, Part Two"	Bob Forward	January 21, 1995
Helspont has stolen the anti-gravity device and prepares a captured Zealot to become his newest servant. After being freed from Daemonite possession, Lonely rushes to Halo Enterprises to save Marlowe from being possessed. An injured Grifter awakens from his coma and heads for the Behemoth alone to rescue Zealot. Meanwhile, after Warblade cracks the Code of Threes, the Wild C.A.T.s return to the temple to release the Orb, but Voodoo realizes why it was sealed by the Elders in the first place.

== Marketing tie-ins ==
CBS published a one-shot comic book to promote the Action Zone time slot, featuring characters from Wild C.A.T.s, Teenage Mutant Ninja Turtles, and Skeleton Warriors. The cover art was illustrated by Jim Lee.

Playmates Toys released a Wild C.A.T.s toy line of six-inch action figures from 1994 to 1995. The characters featured in the toy line were Spartan, Grifter, Zealot (Kherubim Warrior and Coda Uniform versions), Warblade, Maul (standard and Flexon Combat Suit versions), Voodoo, Void, Helspont, Pike, and a generic Daemonite. Mr. Majestic, Max Cash (as Black Razor), Slag, and a color variant of Pike were released as part of the comics-oriented "Image Universe" sub-line. The Bullet Bike was the sole vehicle in the toy line. In addition, Playmates released giant 10-inch figures of Spartan, Grifter, and Maul.

A video game based on the TV series was published by Playmates Interactive in 1995 for the Super NES, with Spartan, Warblade, and Maul as the only playable characters.

== Broadcast ==
The series was broadcast on CBS from September 17, 1994 through September 2, 1995. The series was rebroadcast on the USA Network as part of USA Cartoon Express beginning September 17, 1995.

== Reception ==
TechnicallyIDoComics of The Top Tens ranked Wild C.A.T.s at No. 5 on his list of the Top Ten Worst Comic Book Animated TV Shows, commenting that "choppy animation, sloppy voice-directing, and — most importantly — the most careless writing of any superhero cartoon I've ever witnessed as far as plot progression, character development, and dialogue are all concerned. Add an embarrassingly obnoxious theme song (lyrics and all), and you've got a recipe for disaster".

== Home media ==
Wild C.A.T.s was released on VHS by Sony Wonder from 1994 to 1996. Funimation released the complete series on DVD on July 19, 2005. The series is also available on Amazon Prime Video and Tubi.
