= Travis Charest =

Canadian-American comics creator

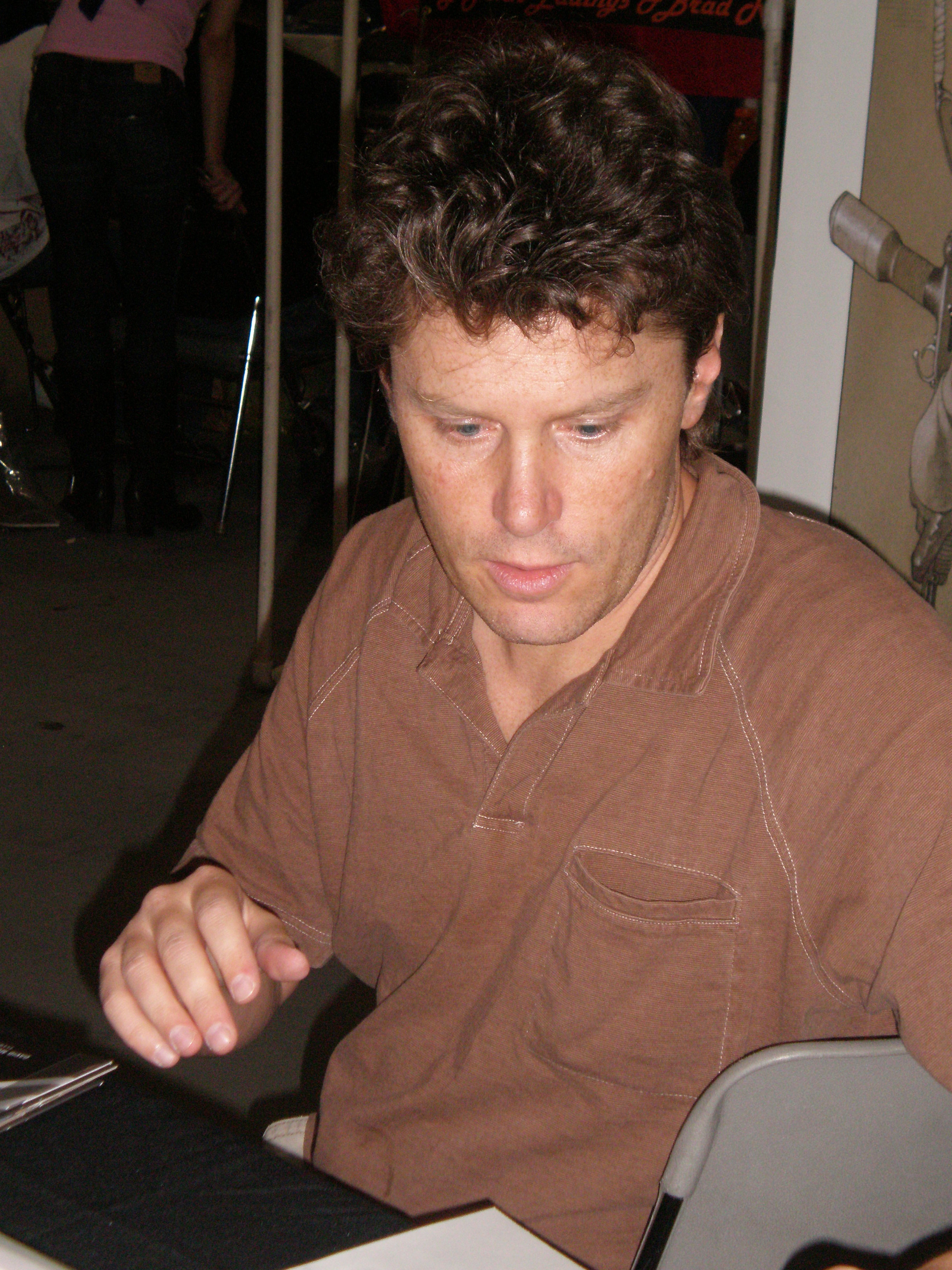
- Charest in May 2009
- Born: 1969 (age 56–57)
- Areas: Penciller, Painter
- Notable works: Darkstars, WildC.A.T.s, Grifter/Shi, WildC.A.T.s/X-Men: The Golden Age, The Metabarons, The Ambassadors

Travis Charest (born 1969) is a Canadian comic book penciller, inker and painter, known for his work on such books as Darkstars, WildC.A.T.s, Grifter/Shi, WildC.A.T.s/X-Men: The Golden Age, The Metabarons, and The Ambassadors. He is known for his detailed line work and muted color palette, and is a much sought-after cover artist, having done extensive cover work for many other books, such as various Star Wars series from Dark Horse Comics. His work has influenced artists such as Chrissie Zullo, Shelby Robertson, and David Marquez.

== Early life ==
Charest was born in 1969 on a farm in the small Canadian town of Leduc, Alberta. His parents held various jobs, though he has stated that his mother and sister were skilled designers, and attributes his early childhood interest in drawing to them.

His earliest exposure to genre illustration came through Metal Hurlant, which his uncle collected. American comics were not among his earliest reading, and his initial drawings were of life, such as animals.

== Career ==
Charest did not initially know how to parlay his drawing ability into a career, as there were no schools where he lived for such an endeavor, and did not foresee it as a profession. He worked a number of dead-end jobs, and it was while living on his own at age 18 or 19, and became friends with people who read comics, that he realized he could make a career out of it. Charest cites Mike Mignola, Adam Hughes, and Brian Bolland among his artistic influences, as well as many artists from the early 20th century.

Charest spent six months continuously producing new sample art and sending them to various publishers, including Marvel Comics and DC Comics. He was selling plumbing supplies at the time he got his big break in the comics industry. In 1992 he got his first paid work, when DC Comics hired him to provide the art for a Flash story in Showcase '93 #3 (March 1993). Charest drew the book from a full script, which he said meant that he did not have to make as many storytelling choices as he would have with a plot script, explaining in a 2020 interview, "My weak point is storytelling, I'm not a great storyteller. I'm good with cars and atmospheric things."

He followed that initial Flash story with another one that appeared in Flash Annual #5 (August 1992), which he calls "my first real thing", and then a story focusing on an arm wrestling match between the Hulk and the Thing written by Peter David in Incredible Hulk Annual #18.

In 1993 Charest became the regular artist on Darkstars, illustrating issues 4 - 7. The job was Charest's first monthly work, and saw him take over the book from Larry Stroman, the inaugural artist of the book and designer of the look of the Darkstars. The book's creative staff had wanted a Stroman emulator, but series writer Michael Jan Friedman describes their change of mind when they came across Charest's work, telling Comics Scene in a 1987 interview, "When Larry left, we were thinking of finding someone who could work in his style. But then when Travis came along, we saw his art was nothing like Larry's—but his stuff could be great. We wanted him to put his own stamp on this book, and I think he has really done it. Charest expressed surprise at how he obtained his first monthly series work so soon after breaking into the field, stating in a 1987 interview in Comics Scene, "I never thought I would get my own book this fast. I was sure I would be doing fill-in work for a long time—it was a surprise to get this big a break...The whole thing, from phoning me to Darkstars, took about three months. Any time I look at my covers or the Flash Annual, I sit there and go, 'Holy smoke! I've got a book!' At Christmas [1991], I was selling plumbing supplies—now I'm pencilling a book I think will take off."

During this same period he also produced cover work for other DC titles such as The Outsiders, Batman, and Detective Comics.

Charest was then contacted by publisher Jim Lee, who offered him work for Wildstorm Productions. Charest's first work for that studio was a pinup that appeared in WildC.A.T.s #0 (June 1993). Later that same year, he illustrated WildC.A.T.s Special #1 (November 1993). He subsequently illustrated back-up stories featuring Voodoo and Warblade in issues 8 and 9 of the regular series (February and March, 1994). He became the regular artist of the series with issue #15, illustrating the title during the runs of writers James Robinson and Alan Moore. While his initial work for Wildstorm was characterized by large amounts of cross-hatching, which was popular among the Image Comics founders and their imitators, Charest's style began to evolve as he looked to other designers that piqued his interest. His last regular issue on WildC.A.T.s was #31 (September 1996), though he later returned to illustrate the title's 50th issue (June 1998). He also did many covers and unpublished private commissions.

In 1999, Charest joined writer Scott Lobdell on a second series of Wildcats, illustrating five of the first six issues. Charest came to feel that his Wildcats work, both under Moore and Lobdel, had begun to "slide," and that it was time to do something different. During San Diego Comic-Con that year, the president of the French publisher Les Humanoïdes Associés invited Charest to lunch, where he offered the artist the opportunity to work on The Metabarons. Charest, having long-enjoyed L'Incal by Moebius, had aspired to work for the same publisher, and was "thrilled" by the offer, relating, "I was very young, ambitious and they told me that I could make complete pages, painted, not just drawn in pencil. I was going to live in Paris with my girlfriend, painting all day. 'It will be great!' I told myself."

In 2000 Charest moved to Paris, where he worked with filmmaker/artist Alejandro Jodorowsky on the Metabarons graphic novel Weapons of the Metabaron. Charest, having grown tired of superheroes, accepted the job, and planned to paint the entire graphic novel, something he had never done before. The process of that work went much more slowly than Charest had anticipated, and he illustrated only the first 29 pages of the book. Travis describes the feedback he received from his colleagues thus: "My editor encouraged me to be faster, while Jodorowsky always said, 'Don't listen to them, I'll distract them, you do what you want.'" Because Charest could only paint two or three pages a month, and he and his girlfriend had trouble paying the bills that incurred from living in Paris, they left the city after only a couple of years, and returned to the United States, where Charest's girlfriend could work. Humanoid Publishing selected Serbian artist Zoran Janjetov, who previously worked on the Incal books John Difool and Technopriests, to complete the art for the project. Confessing that it was too much for him to handle at that point in his career, Charest stated in a 2020 interview that he no longer wished to paint interior pages, as it took him a week to paint an interior page, and that if he wished to produce fully-illustrated work, he would only do pencils and have another artist paint it.

By 2007 Charest had settled in California. Among his subsequent work was cover art for David Morrell's Captain America: The Chosen mini-series. He also ran the free webcomic strip Spacegirl on his MSN group. In 2008, a limited edition printed volume hardcover of Spacegirl was self-published by Charest and Big Wow Art, collecting the first 56 strips of the series.

In September 2022, Marvel released Fantastic Four: Full Circle, an original graphic novel written and illustrated by Alex Ross, in which Ross utilized for the titular group's uniforms a stylized numeral "4" that Charest had designed in 2013. In the 2024 Expanded Edition of the book, Ross wrote, "Artist Travis Charest had designed a beautiful '4' for an armored suit I saw in his 2013 sketchbook. I sampled his approach and tried to vary it, but eventually, I felt I couldn't improve upon it. Once Full Circle was moving forward, I asked Travis for permission to use the exact style of the 4 which he generously gave me."

== Technique and materials ==
Charest usually prefers not to employ preliminary sketching practices, such as layouts, thumbnails or lightboxing, in part due to impatience, and in part because he enjoys the serendipitous way in which artwork develops when produced with greater spontaneity. He also prefers to use reference only when rendering objects that require a degree of real-life accuracy, such as guns, vehicles, or characters of licensed properties that must resemble actors with whom they are closely identified, as when he illustrated the cover to Star Trek: The Next Generation: Embrace the Wolf in 2000.

Charest previously illustrated on regular illustration board provided by publishers, though he disliked the non-photo blue lines printed on them. By 2000, he switched to Crescent board for all his work, because it does not warp when wet, produces sharper illustrations, and is more suitable for framing because it lacks the non-photo blue lines.

Charest uses mainly 2H lead to avoid smearing, and sometimes HB lead. For ink wash, he uses Rapidograph ink, and waters it down to three hues in order to achieve light gray, medium and charcoal tones, in addition to straight black. He applies the wash with watercolor brushes of various sizes. To ink linework he uses Rapidographs of all sizes. For color work, Charest uses Aquarelle watercolor pencils and acrylic paint for airbrush work. He also uses white Pelikan ink for additional effects such as highlights, fades and blends. Charest stated in 2000 that while he did not use a computer for his artwork, he would be using one soon, and anticipated they would be a necessity for professional artists. By the 2020s, he was producing artwork digitally, which allows him to complete pieces more quickly. His cover for Batman/Catwoman #6 (October 2021), for example, was made entirely in this method, which he explained was due to time constraints that required him to finish it more quickly.

According to Charest, the time he needs to finish a given page varies, depending on how fast his editor needs it, and what he is being paid, though because he came to prefer producing artwork that takes longer than the norm to complete by the time he left Wildstorm, he stated in 2000 that he no longer found it feasible to be the regular artist on a monthly series. He points to WildC.A.T.s/X-Men: The Golden Age as an example of a book that took him considerable time (under a year), though he stresses that he finished it on time.

== Influence ==
Charest's work has influenced artists such as Chrissie Zullo, Shelby Robertson, and David Marquez.

== Personal life ==
As of 1995, Charest was living in San Diego, California. As of 2020, he had a wife and a ten-year-old daughter.

== Bibliography ==
=== Interior comic work ===
- The Flash Annual #5: "Family Business" (with Mark Waid and Craig Boldman, DC Comics, 1992)
- The Incredible Hulk Annual #18: "Mano A Mano" (with Peter David, Marvel, 1992)
- Darkstars #4-7 (with Michael Jan Friedman, DC Comics, 1993)
- Showcase '93 #3: "Delay of Game" (with Michael J. Martinek, DC Comics, 1993)
- DC Universe: Trinity #1: "Darkstars" (with Michael Jan Friedman, DC Comics, 1993)
- Green Lantern Corps Quarterly #6: "What Price Honor?" (with Ruben Diaz, DC Comics, 1993)
- WildC.A.T.s: Covert Action Teams (Wildstorm):
  - "Destiny's Hand" (with Steve Gerber, in Special #1, 1993)
  - "Voodoo: Passed Lives" (with Steven T. Seagle, in #8, 1994)
  - "Warblade: The Bonds of Blood & Steel" (with Jeff Mariotte, in #9, 1994)
  - "End Program" (with James Robinson, in #15-17, 1994–1995)
  - "Hard Hunt" (with James Robinson, in #18, 1995)
  - "Wild Storm Rising" (with James Robinson, in #20, 1995)
  - "Call of the Wild" (with Alan Moore, in #21, 1995)
  - "...as It is in Heaven" (with Alan Moore, in #25, 1995)
  - "Khera" (with Alan Moore, in #26, 1996)
  - "Cataclysm" (with Alan Moore, Dave Johnson and Aron Wiesenfeld, in #28, 1996)
  - "Fire from Heaven, Parts Seven and Thirteen" (with Alan Moore and Ryan Benjamin, in #29-30, 1996)
  - "Cats & Dogs" (with Alan Moore, Jim Lee and Josh Wiesenfeld, in #31, 1996)
  - "Reincarnation" (with Alan Moore, in #50, 1998)
- Gen^{13} #0: "Things Change" (with Brandon Choi, Wildstorm, 1994)
- Union #7: "One Month" (with Mike Heisler, among other artists, Wildstorm, 1995)
- Grifter/Shi #1-2: "Final Rites" (with Brandon Choi, Jim Lee, Peter Gutierrez, Billy Tucci and Ryan Benjamin, Image, 1996)
- WildC.A.T.s/X-Men: The Golden Age (with Scott Lobdell, one-shot, Wildstorm, 1997)
- Captain America v2 #7: "Crossroads" (with James Robinson, among other artists, Marvel, 1997)
- Aliens: Havoc #2 (with Mark Schultz, among other artists, Dark Horse, 1997)
- Wildcats v2 (Wildstorm):
  - "Balance of Terror" (with Scott Lobdell, in #1, 1999)
  - "Second Skin" (with Scott Lobdell, in #2, 1999)
  - "Flavors" (with Scott Lobdell, in #3, 1999)
  - "Firefight" (with Scott Lobdell, Carlos D'Anda and Anthony Winn, in #4, 1999)
  - "The Chase" (with Scott Lobdell, Joe Casey and Scott Benefiel, in #6, 2000)
- Metabarons (with Alejandro Jodorowsky, Les Humanoïdes Associés):
  - Sans Nom, le Dernier des Métabarons (The Last Metabaron) (one-shot, 2002)
  - Les Armes du Meta-Baron (Weapons of the Metabaron) (with Zoran Janjetov, graphic novel, 2008)
- Ultimates Saga (with C.B. Cebulski and Mindy Owens, Marvel, 2007)
- Captain America v1 #616: "Origin" (with Ed Brubaker, Marvel, 2011)
- The Ambassadors #3 (with Mark Millar, 2023)

=== Cover work ===
- Darkstars #1-3, 8-11 (DC Comics, 1992–1993)
- Detective Comics #652-653 (DC Comics, 1992)
- Batman #488-490 (DC Comics, 1993)
- Robin III: Cry of the Huntress #3 (DC Comics, 1993)
- Robin: Tragedy & Triumph TPB (trade paperback; DC Comics, 1993)
- Outsiders #1α, 1Ω (DC Comics, 1993)
- WildC.A.T.s: Covert Action Teams #19, 22-24, 40 (Wildstorm, 1995–1997)
- Shattered Image #2 (Image, 1996)
- Wetworks #32 (Wildstorm, 1997)
- Divine Right: The Adventures of Max Faraday #1 (Wildstorm, 1997)
- Phantom Guard #1 (Wildstorm, 1997)
- Stormwatch #1 (Wildstorm, 1997)
- Wildcore #1 (Wildstorm, 1997)
- DV8 #14 (Wildstorm, 1997)
- Gen^{13} #25 (Wildstorm, 1997)
- Battle Chasers #1 (Cliffhanger, 1998)
- C-23 #0-3 (Image, 1998)
- Danger Girl #3 (Cliffhanger, 1998)
- Wildcats #5, 7-11 (Wildstorm, 1999–2000)
- Star Trek: The Next Generation: Embrace the Wolf GN (Wildstorm, 2000)
- Star Wars: Knights of the Old Republic #1, 3-6, 25 (Dark Horse, 2006–2008)
- Star Wars: Legacy #14-19, 28 (Dark Horse, 2007–2008)
- Captain America: The Chosen #1-6 (Marvel, 2007–2008)
- Star Wars: Dark Times #11 (Dark Horse, 2008)
- Star Wars: Rebellion #15 (Dark Horse, 2008)
- Invincible Iron Man #3 (Marvel, 2008)
- Atomika #10 (Mercury, 2009)
- Skaar: Son of Hulk #11 (Marvel, 2009)
- Star Wars: Purge – Seconds to Die #1 (Dark Horse, 2009)
- Astonishing X-Men #31 (Marvel, 2009)
- Avengers: The Children's Crusade #2 (Marvel, 2010)
- The Mighty Thor #1 (Marvel, 2011)
- Chrononauts: Futureshock #1 (Image, variant, 2019)
