= Helspont =

Lord Helspont

Publication information
- Publisher: Wildstorm (Image Comics, later DC Comics)
- First appearance: WildC.A.T.s #1 (August 1992)
- Created by: Brandon Choi; Jim Lee

In-story information
- Alter ego: Helspont
- Team affiliations: The Cabal; Daemonites
- Notable aliases: Wyvern; Desmond
- Abilities: Telekinesis; Telepathy; Shapeshifting; Superhuman strength and durability; Possession of other living beings; Immortality

Helspont is a character in Wildstorm's comics who was ultimately transplanted to the DC Universe. In addition to the WildC.A.T.s, he has also fought Team One, Gen^{13}, Backlash, and when folded into the DC Universe, Superman.

== Fictional character biography ==
Helspont is a member of the alien race known as the Daemonites, serving as a high-level military commander. Helspont possessed another alien at some unknown point in time, which became his default form. Helspont was stationed on the Daemonite ship that crashed on Earth thousands of years ago. He, along with the two other highest-ranked surviving Daemonites, took the title High Lord and became a leader to the other Daemonites. Helspont had many Daemonites serving under him, though another lord, Defile, formed his rival faction. Helspont and his servants also formed alliances with several humans over the years, which became the predecessor to the Cabal.

During the Third Crusade, Helspont found an English crusader, Dakor of Cambria, who intended to commit suicide. Dakor had previously been found, severely injured, by the Kherubim warrior Zealot, then known as Constance, who attempted to train him in the ways of the Coda, her society. However, Dakor had failed Constance's tests and she and another Coda defeated him in combat. Shamed by having been defeated by women, Dakor attempted suicide, only to be stopped by Helspont, who convinced him that Constance had used magic to steal his strength and leading him to believe the duel was unfair as he was outnumbered. Helspont, wanting his own organization to counter-balance the Coda, had Dakor create a group of warriors known as the Quiet Men. The Quiet Men would go on to fight against the Coda and Zealot multiple times over the following centuries.

In the 1960s, Helspont encountered post-human mobster Slaughterhouse Smith and his gang, offering Smith control over North America by the end of the decade if he allied himself with Helspont against humanity. Helspont, his Daemonite foot-soldiers, and Smith and his gang formed a new Cabal. Helspont led the Cabal in an attack on a U.S. nuclear missile base with the aim of using the nuclear missiles in the base to hold the country for ransom. Helspont ordered the Cabal to nuke New York City as a warning to the government, though Smith refused, since his family lived in New York, and his men turned against him, siding with Helspont. Helspont revealed his true goal to Smith as the destruction of the world. The U.S. government strike team Team One attempted to foil the Cabal's plans. Helspont briefly engaged in battle with Marc Slayton, before the fight was interrupted by Cabal member Daniel Pike. Helspont then found himself locked in battle with one his most hated enemies, Mr. Majestic, the two being evenly-matched. Helspont's plan failed due to Team One's intervention, and he went on to escape.

=== Reunification ===
Helspont returned with a new plan in the 1990s. Instead of eradicating the human race on his own, he plans on contacting a Daemonite armada to attack Earth. However, Helspont requires a magical orb to create and maintain the portal needed for the invasion. One of the other orbs is carried inside the body of Void, a member of the WildC.A.T.s. To help retrieve the orb before the WildC.A.T.s could stop him, Helspont creates a new incarnation of the Cabal, consisting of a Coda, Pike, a psychic named Providence, several humans, and several Daemonites.

Helspont has one of the Daemonites break into a NASA compound and steal the orb. After the orb is stolen, Helspont has one of the Daemonites possess Dan Quayle, the Vice President of the United States. Using Quayle, the Daemonite secures a military base with which he can operate the orb.

Helspont and his scientists succeed in beginning the Reunification and overwhelm the WildC.A.T.S. after being attacked by them. However, Voodoo, Maul and Spartan regain enough strength to kill the Daemonite possessing Dan Quayle. Emp uses a hidden communicator to contact Spartan, who shuts down the entire compound. As a result, the orb stopped working properly. Helspont attempts to retrieve the orb, but is caught an explosion engineered by his former ally Gnome, who wanted the orb's power for himself. Helspont, Gnome and the orb are all assumed dead or destroyed.

=== Mr. Majestic ===
Helspont survives and goes on to pose as James Wyvern, the owner of technology company Pacificon. Much of the technology created by Pacificon was reverse-engineered from Kherubim tech. Mr. Majestic, his partner Desmond, and Zealot encounter Helspont in a defective Planet Shaper, which he has designs on. Helspont reveals his true identity and intent to obtain control over the Planet Shaper, which he intends to use to reshape Earth to be suitable for the Kherubim. The Planet Shaper reveals that it is meant to alter planets to better match the conditions necessary for Kherubim life, as well as generate Kherubim life forms and alter existing beings into servant species and keep them from rebelling against the Kherubims, the Daemonites being a potential servant species that were considered too aberrant, leading the Kherubim to attempt to exterminate them, leading to the Daemonite-Kherubim War. This revelation led Helspont to feel his hatred of Khera and the Kherubims was further justified, and he attacked Khera. Helspont eventually ceased his attack and fled.

Helspont possesses Desmond, who is connected to Planet Shaper. He repeatedly attempts to activate the machine's terraforming processes, but is thwarted by Mr. Majestic. As Majestic is about to die, all life on Earth is kidnapped by a powerful alien force, deactivating the Planet Shaper. Majestic separates Helspont from the Planet Shaper and kills him with his laser vision.

=== Helspont Redux ===
In the Wildstorm Universe relaunch (WildCats v4), Helspont is a living hive mind. When the number of Daemonites reaches a certain number, a "central mind" is created. It has the knowledge and intelligence of every member of the entire Daemonite race and is able to control other Daemonites with a thought.

=== Other schemes ===
Sometime after Helspont's first run in with the WildC.A.T.s and his failed attempt at Reunification, he begins pursuing a Daemonite vessel that had crashes on Earth. The ship turned out not to be a Daemonite one, but a Kheran one. In the fight that follows, Helspont overcomes most of the heroes, but is stopped by Mr. Majestic.

Shortly after Wildstorm Rising, Helspont establishes the company Pacificon under the alias James Wyvern and begins selling alien technology in a bid to gain power. This plan came to an end when Helspont learned of the Planet Shaper, a machine he wanted to use to turn the world into a place suitable only for Daemonites. When he went to secure the machine, he ran into Mr. Majestic and was forced to abandon his previous plan and secret identity.

=== The New 52 ===
In September 2011, The New 52 rebooted DC's continuity. In this new timeline, which merges the Wildstorm universe, the Helspont and the Daemonites origin is adjusted. Nearly four thousand years ago, the Daemonite prince Artus returned to his mother's castle carrying the body of his dead wife, a victim of what he believes is the genetic decline of their species. The combination of Daemonite DNA with other species resulted in the spread of auto-immune deficiencies, cancers, higher infant mortality rates and Artus believed this weakened their race. As a result of this, he was cast out of court by his mother, all while he swore that he would return his people to their proper place as conquerors of the universe. Taking the name Helspont, Artus' peoples' fear caused him to be imprisoned in the Eye, which would eventually become the headquarters of Stormwatch.

Some 4,000 years later, when Harry Tanner sets off an explosion that destroys the Eye, Helspont's prison cell crashes on Earth in the Himalayas. Helspont, now freed, establishes a new base and confronts Superman. Helspont launches a full-scale assault against Superman and other alien heroes such as Starfire and Hawkman, trying to recruit them.

== Powers and abilities ==
Helspont's host body has shown superhuman strength and durability, comparable to Mr. Majestic. His Acurian host gives him vast psionic powers including telekinesis and mental attacks as well as energy blasts. Like all Daemonites, he can possess host bodies at will, though doing so would mean he has to give up his powerful Acurian host body.

== In other media ==
- Helspont appears in Wild C.A.T.s, voiced by Maurice Dean Wint.
- A Helspont figure from Playmates Toys was released in 1994.
