= Deathblow (comics) =

- Deathblow, art by Jim Lee

Publication information
- Publisher: Wildstorm
- First appearance: Darker Image #1 (March 1993)
- Created by: Jim Lee and Brandon Choi

In-story information
- Alter ego: Michael Cray
- Team affiliations: Team 6 Team 7 Gen 12; International Operations; Stormwatch; Team LaSport
- Abilities: Hand-to-hand combatant; Expert marksman; Accelerated healing factor; Psychokinesis

Deathblow (Michael Cray) is a Wildstorm Productions comic book character created by Jim Lee and Brandon Choi. He first appears in Darker Image #1 (March 1993).

== Development ==
The series came about due to Jim Lee's desire to experiment with a different approach to art style and comics outside of superheroes. Due to Deathblow following a CIA assassin facing a crisis of morality over the lives he ended when faced with impending death from a terminal illness, Lee opted to use grittier, painted artwork with a craggy texture in order to convey the dark and menacing world portrayed in the story. Lee described Deathblow as a "quantity limited series" wherein Deathblow would be introduced and established in a four part mini-arc in Darker Image before transitioning to his own book in Deathblow #1 with an envisioned endpoint for the character but depending on the needs of the story could be as short as ten issues or as long as 20. Deathblow's incorporation of Christian mythology and the Second Coming took influence from Lee and creative partner Brandon Choi's shared childhoods characterized by a Catholic upbringing, but noted that the story wasn't necessarily a "Christian" story and was intended primarily to use it as a backdrop to examine themes of salvation and redemption on a more personal character-based level rather than a Biblical one. Lee stated in a way, this was his attempt to deconstruct violent Punisher-like characters by throwing their own twisted sense of morality back in their faces as Lee felt on their own, vigilante characters are rather "cardboard" and uninteresting.

== Fictional character biography ==
Michael Cray was born to U.S. Navy Admiral Phillip James Cray and Elizabeth Cray. After his parents were killed by terrorists, he joins the U.S. military to avenge their deaths. He became a Navy SEAL prior to being transferred to International Operation's newly formed Team 7. All members of the group are exposed to the Gen-Factor, which gives them superpowers. Unlike the other members of Team 7, Michael's powers did not manifest until many years later.

Michael Cray leaves International Operations after being diagnosed with a brain tumor, wanting to atone for the civilians he had killed during his missions. Michael becomes involved with the Order of the Cross and learns that his tumor was a result of the Gen-Factor, giving him regenerative abilities. Cray defeats the Order's adversary, Black Angel, with the help of his ex-wife Gabrielle D'Angelo, his ex-wife who had become a vessel for the archangel Gabriel, and several of his Team 7 colleagues. After the death of the Black Angel, the young child the entity had been targeting restores the damage he had done by rewriting reality. In the new reality, Gabrielle died during her and Michael's honeymoon.

Deathblow dies during the Fire from Heaven event, sacrificing himself to kill Damocles. After the events of Captain Atom: Armageddon and the Worldstorm, Deathblow was revived and began starring in his own series, Deathblow (vol. 2), written by Brian Azzarello with art by Carlos D'Anda.

=== Genevieve Cray ===
In the three-issue miniseries, Deathblow: Byblows (1999–2000), written by Alan Moore with art by Jim Baikie, it is revealed that I.O. created several clones of each Team 7 member, using the DNA collected from them without their knowledge. Ten clones of Deathblow were created: Genevieve Cray, Klaus Cray, John-Joe Cray, Joe-John Cray, Michael Cray Jr., Damon Cray, Caleb Cray, Gemma Cray, Cynthia Gray, and Judgment Cray. All were killed by Judgment except for Genevieve, who killed Judgment and escaped from the laboratory where they were created, and Klaus Cray, who was captured by Genevieve and later killed by John-Joe and Joe-John.

=== DC's The New 52 ===
Deathblow appears for the first time in the DC reboot in Grifter's new series, making a team with Cheshire, but later was betrayed by her revealing she was an undercover agent for Helspont. Captured in Helspont's spaceship, he managed to escape and team up with Grifter to stop his plans.

=== The Wild Storm ===
Michael Cray is an IO operative for Miles Craven, sent to assassinate Jacob Marlowe, the head of Halolife Industries. The attempt thwarted by several unforeseen factors, such as Marlowe being an alien, the unexpected intervention of Angelica Spica, and Michael having superpowers he had not previously known about. While being questioned by Craven, Michael suddenly collapses. Having himself medically examined, Michael learns he has an inoperable brain tumor. Craven offers Michael continued medical support, provided Michael goes after Spica, but Michael begins to have qualms about his employer's motives on seeing a recording of Spica. Craven immediately withdraws any support and sends an assassination squad after Michael. With assistance from Christine Trelane, Michael is able to kill them, with Trelane offering him a new job.

Michael discovers his powers and the tumor are the result of being implanted with Daemon biology many years ago, with the Daemon gaining increasing control over him. Michael becomes drawn into a plot involving John Constantine and Diana Prince, who is convinced she is the daughter of the Greek gods and wishes to summon them to Earth. Finally acquiescing to the Daemon's control, Michael defeats Prince and leaves Trelane's employment.

Michael returns to New York City during a mass outbreak of metahumans experimented on by IO and Skywatch. He intervenes in Marc Slayton's attempt on Craven's life, killing the man with his death touch. He tells Craven to leave him alone, but Craven, in the middle of a paranoid breakdown, shoots and kills Michael.

== Publications ==
A new Deathblow (vol. 2) series began on October 25, 2006, with the second issue out a month later. Issue #9 (February 2008) was the last issue of this series, ending with the 'death' of the character.

A 12-issue series titled Michael Cray was published by DC Comics under the Wildstorm imprint in 2017–2018.

== Collected editions ==
Title	Material	Publication date	ISBN
Deathblow: Sinners and Saints	Deathblow (vol. 1) #1-12	November 1999	978-1563895470
Deathblow Deluxe Edition	Deathblow (vol. 1) #0-12, Darker Image #1	March 2014	978-1401247607
Deathblow/Wolverine	Deathblow/Wolverine #1-2	August 1997	978-1887279611
Batman/Deathblow: After the Fire	Batman/Deathblow: After the Fire #1-3	May 2003	978-1401200343
Wild Worlds	Deathblow: Byblows #1-3 and Spawn/WildC.A.T.s #1-4, Voodoo #1-4, Voodoo: Dancing in the Dark #1, WildC.A.T.S #50, Wildstorm Spotlight #1	August 2007	978-1401213794
Deathblow:...And Then You Live	Deathblow (vol. 2) #1-9	August 2008	978-1401215156
The Wild Storm: Michael Cray Vol. 1	The Wild Storm: Michael Cray #1-6	July 2018	978-1401281052
The Wild Storm: Michael Cray Vol. 2	The Wild Storm: Michael Cray #7-12	January 2019	978-1401285586
