= Wildcats (comics) =

Multimedia franchise

- WildC.A.T.s original team, art by Jim Lee
- Created by: Jim Lee; Brandon Choi
- Owners: WildStorm (Image Comics; after 1998: DC Comics)
- Years: 1992–2022

The Wildcats, sometimes rendered WildCats or WildC.A.T.s, is a multimedia franchise based on a superhero team created by Jim Lee, an American comic book artist, and writer Brandon Choi. They published a comic in various formats from 1992 through 2022, which formed the basis for a television show, a line of toys, and a video game.

== Development ==
When the founders of Image Comics were developing the shared universe for their company, Rob Liefeld's positioning of Youngblood as operating like the FBI and CIA but also maintaining a celebrity image with the public led to Jim Lee choosing to develop a superhero team that would shun the limelight and instead focus on covert operations. Lee stated he had always liked the concept of a team that had something to prove, or who did something that not everyone knew about.

== Publication history ==
The first issue of their eponymous comic book, WildC.A.T.s: Covert Action Teams, published in August 1992 by Image Comics. It was Image founding partner Jim Lee's first work published by the newly launched company and his first creator-owned project. This became the starting point for Lee's menagerie of interconnected superhero creations which became the foundation of the Wildstorm Universe.

The Wildcats launched at the apex of a speculator-fueled comics sales boom and was wildly popular at its inception. Wholesale sales to comic book stores exceeded one million copies for early issues. This first series ran for 50 issues and, in addition to Lee, featured work by comics creators such as Travis Charest, Chris Claremont, James Robinson and Alan Moore. This popularity saw the property expand into other media, with an animated adaptation of the comic debuting on CBS in 1994 and a toyline from Playmates Toys.

In 1998, ownership of the Wildcats concepts and characters were sold to DC Comics, a subsidiary of Time Warner Entertainment, as part of DC's acquisition of Lee's company Wildstorm Productions. A new incarnation of the team was soon launched under the simplified title Wildcats, focusing on the former members of the now-disbanded team and emphasizing a grittier tone during its 28-issue run. The third series, Wildcats Version 3.0, revolved around the HALO Corporation, its CEO Jack Marlowe (an amalgamation of original team members Spartan and Void), Grifter, and a gallery of new characters subverting corporate politics to their cause of creating a better world. This incarnation lasted 24 issues and was followed by a nine-issue limited series, Wildcats: Nemesis, which returned to a more superheroic style reminiscent of the first series. In late 2006, a fourth ongoing series was launched as a part of the Worldstorm publishing initiative. The series saw the return of Jim Lee as regular penciller for the first time since its first volume; Grant Morrison took over writing duties. Only one issue was ever published, and future issues were placed on hold. In mid-2008, the fifth volume of Wildcats was launched, tying into the World's End crossover event.

=== WildC.A.T.s volume 1 (1992) ===
Launched as an original Image comic book title by Jim Lee and his friend writer Brandon Choi, the comic book's premise revolved around the centuries-long war between aliens called Kherubim and Daemonites. Kherubim, a nearly immortal, humanoid species with exceptional powers and skills, traveled to Earth and, by breeding with humans, populated the planet with "Half-Breeds". Daemonites, besides having a fearsome appearance, also possessed various superhuman abilities, including body possession and mental control over human beings. The initial arc brought Voodoo over to the team as the readers' point-of-view character as Helspont, a Daemonite warlord, had taken control over Vice President of the United States Dan Quayle. Rob Liefeld's Youngblood co-starred in the closing chapters of the arc.

WildC.A.T.s' story continued in a three-part mini-series, penciled by Jae Lee, that introduced the Daemonite Lord Hightower. Jim Lee and Marc Silvestri proceeded to publish a 'Killer Instinct' crossover detailing Warblade's connection to Marc Silvestri's Cyber Force.

Jim Lee devoted his time to coming up with the new concepts of Gen13, Deathblow, and Stormwatch. Before he left the book, he did the four-issue Gathering of Eagles storyline written by his Uncanny X-Men writer, Chris Claremont. It featured a new villain Tapestry and added the characters of Mr. Majestic, Savant, and Soldier, and featured Claremont's creator-owned character, Huntsman.

Almost all of the characters were spun off into their own mini-series, with Zealot featured in a series by Ron Marz and Terry Shoemaker, Spartan in one by Kurt Busiek and Mike McKone, Warblade sharing another with Cyberforce's Ripclaw, Grifter co-starred in The Kindred's limited series with Stormwatch's Backlash by Brett Booth that led to the latter's ongoing title, as well as another with Youngblood's Badrock, Billy Tucci's Shi, and even Dark Horse's Mask.

James Robinson wrote a handful of issues as well as a Team One Stormwatch/WildC.A.T.s mini-series detailing the past of the Wildstorm universe and would go on to write the Wildcats' first annual. The title also participated in the WildC.A.T.s-oriented "Wildstorm Rising" crossover that saw the heroes try to gain control of the Daemonite battleship, which turned out to be the Kheran ship instead, with WildC.A.T.s eventually leaving for Khera. Following a Grifter one-shot, the crossover gave birth to a short-lived Grifter series written by Steven T. Seagle that centered on his super-spy/superhero adventures while linking to an obscure Team One character Regiment at one point.

Alan Moore then took over writing duties, and proceeded to tell a tale split between Savant and Majestic's replacement team on Earth and the original team journeying to Khera. The Kherubim had won the Daemonite-Kherubim war and were living in prosperity. Appearances were deceiving, however, and it was apparent the planet was run by power-hungry politicians who had ruthlessly subjugated the Daemonites as second-class citizens. Voodoo, with her Daemonite blood, experienced this firsthand. Maul's race was also treated unjustly and though Emp and Zealot were seduced by promises of power and recognition, Spartan discovered the truth about Khera's corrupt leaders. It took the death of one of Maul's race for the WildC.A.T.s to leave and head back for Earth. Voodoo and Emp both left the team, while the remainder joined with Savant and Majestic's new team. Moore also participated in Fire From Heaven, a fairly continuity-heavy crossover that resolved plotlines regarding Team One, Team 7, and Kaizen Gamorra.

Alan Moore, Mike Lopez and Al Rio spun Voodoo off in a four-issue mini-series that dealt with voodoo magic, while Moore also wrote a time-traveling WildC.A.T.s/Spawn crossover mini-series drawn by Scott Clark and inked by Sal Regla.

At the time, Grifter had another turn at an ongoing series, this time written by Steven Grant and drawn by Mel Rubi and Michael Ryan, while Zealot was featured in a Backlash spinoff, Wildcore.

Barbara Randall Kesel, Pasqual Ferry, Rich Johnson, and Carlos D'Anda crafted a two-part storyline that, in effect, wrote Majestic, Savant and Ladytron out of the team, and set up the spin-off Savant Garde, written by Randall Kesel. Original scripter Brandon Choi returned alongside Johnathan Peterson and artists Mat Broome and Ed Benes for a storyline with an organization called Puritans as the main villains. The Puritans' goal was to eradicate the Kherubim and Daemonites on Earth by traveling back in time and erasing killing them before the aliens could influence global events. A new line-up of WildC.A.T.s traveled in time to stop the Puritans, and had various adventures throughout different time periods.

=== Wildcats volume 1 (1999) ===
After the first series' cancellation, WildStorm, now an imprint of DC Comics, resurrected the Wildcats under a whole different premise—Wildcats dealt with the lives of the original members after the team's breakup following a botched mission during which team member Zealot apparently died. Scott Lobdell provided the writing for the initial seven issues as well as a Mosaic one-shot detailing the change in Lord Emp, with Travis Charest penciling most of them. New villains like Kenyan and CC Rendozzo were featured as antagonists, but it was dropped quickly, with Charest leaving the monthly comic format to work on a French Metabarons graphic novel called Dreamshifters and Lobdell exiting a couple of issues later.

As Joe Casey and Sean Phillips took over Wildcats, they quickly dealt away with Kenyan, while Void and Emp ended up having Spartan absorb their assets and powers; thus the book began a long spell featuring him aided by Ladytron and Grifter with Maul and Voodoo guest-starring, as well as new characters Noir, and Agents Wax and Mohr of the National Park Service. Warblade was featured very briefly, last seen in the Wildcats 2000 annual that brought back the dead version Condition Red killing Olympia. Casey and Phillips signaled the new Wildstorm, critically acclaimed but low on readers' radar. The heroes fought Samuel Smith (a superhuman serial killer whose grandfather had appeared in Team One: WildC.A.T.s) after which eventually Zealot returned. Casey also wrote the Ladytron one shot, a farsic rendition of her past, as well as a Mister Majestic ongoing series which ran for nine issues.

Wild Times: Wildcats and Wild Times: Grifter were published as one-shots as a part of the crossover series Wild Times that spotlighted the characters in Elseworlds-like alternate reality scenarios that blended genres. Wildcats also participated in the WildC.A.T.s/Aliens crossover written by Stormwatch's Warren Ellis that served as a coda to that series and a prequel to his Authority run, having little to do with the Wildcats themselves.

=== Wildcats 3.0 (2002) ===
The third series, Wildcats Version 3.0, was a part of the mature readers' Eye of the Storm imprint, dealing with Spartan's (now Jack Marlowe) agenda to better the world by proliferating advanced technology and power sources throughout the world via the HALO Corporation. Grifter was his troubleshooter and Agent Wax was one of his first associates. The stories added a motley group to this proactive organization including the power broker C.C. Rendozzo and her organization, Agent Orange, and Grifter's unlikely pupil Edwin Dolby, one of HALO's accountants. The series ended with a thunderous finale where Zealot, Marlowe, and a team assembled by Grifter destroyed the Coda chapter that Zealot had created on Earth. The series was written by Joe Casey and drawn by Dustin Nguyen, Duncan Rouleau, Francisco Ruiz Velasco, Pascual Ferry, and Sean Phillips.

Concurrent with Wildcats Version 3.0, Wildstorm also published the noir-superhero series Sleeper starring Grifter and Wildcats villain Tao. As part of the crossover Coup D'État, centering on the Wildstorm Universe's United States, a Wildcats 3.0: Coup D'État one-shot was released.

After guest-starring in Superman books, in 2004 DC published a Mr. Majestic mini-series to test waters for an ongoing series that ran for 17 issues.

Wildcats starred in a limited series by Robbie Morrison and Talent Caldwell entitled Wildcats: Nemesis, focusing on Zealot, Majestic, and the Coda continuity, while heavily spotlighting the new Wildstorm universe anti-hero character of Nemesis.

At the same time, Wildstorm published the Captain Atom: Armageddon maxi-series, heavily featuring the Wildcats as they tried to help DC character Captain Atom return to his universe and stop him from accidentally destroying their reality. Nikola, a female medic, became the new Void with Captain Atom sharing a part of the power that eventually remade the Wildstorm universe altogether.

=== Wildcats: Nemesis (2005) ===
Wildcats: Nemesis was a 9-issue miniseries, published from November 2005 to July 2006. Written by Robbie Morrison and illustrated by various artists, it featured Nemesis and Wildcats. In 2006 it was collected into a trade paperback (ISBN 978-1-4012-1105-9).

=== Wildcats volume 3 (2006) ===
In 2006, as part of the "Worldstorm" line-wide event, the title was restarted, written by Grant Morrison and drawn by Jim Lee. The team consisted of Spartan, Mr. Majestic, Zealot, Grifter, Voodoo, Savant, and Ladytron. Warblade is on a secret mission, and Maul has retired to his civilian identity. Kaizen Gamorra returned as the villain, aided by the WildCats' first enemy, Helspont. However, the title was permanently put on hold after only one issue.

=== Wildcats volume 4 (2008) ===
In July 2008 Wildstorm debuted a new ongoing WildCats series written by Christos Gage and pencilled by Neil Googe following on from the imprint's Number of the Beast mini-series. Adam Beechen took over writing duties from Gage in late 2009, with he and artist Tim Seeley starting with issue #19 until the book's cancellation in December 2010 with #30.

=== WildC.A.T.s volume 2 (2022) ===
In November 2022 (cover date January 2023), DC debuted WildC.A.T.s; it was the second volume to feature the same abbreviated stylization in the title as the first series in 1992. Written by Matthew Rosenberg and illustrated by Stephen Segovia, it sees Grifter working for the HALO Corporation to assemble a group of operatives to embark upon missions in the outskirts of the DC Universe. Its first task is to round up an elite group of scientists, which puts the group into conflict with the scientists' mysterious leader, Void. The team also comes into conflict with a shadowy organization called the Court of Owls.

== Cast ==
=== Original team ===
The original WildC.A.T.s (Covert Action Team) consisted of:

- Spartan (Jack Marlowe, originally Hadrian-7): Originally intended to be a highly sophisticated cyborg who could "die" and easily be downloaded to another body, Spartan's character has been revised several times. Spartan was one many Spartan-series androids made in Khera, modeled after the Kherubim hero Yohn Kohl, who would go on to be known on Earth as John Colt. After Colt's apparent death in battle, Jacob Marlowe implanted some of Colt's memories and personality in Spartan's bodies. Additionally, Jacob had a scientist design Spartan's artificial intelligence, knowing the scientist would model it after his deceased son-in-law, Spartan had something of an on-again, off-again relationship with Voodoo. Eventually, Colt's memories and personality returned, and, for some time, Spartan considered himself to be John Colt. While another Spartan unit without Colt's memories would go on to be activated, and John Colt would leave the team, eventually the Colt personality receded. After Emp's death, Spartan assumed the identity of Jack Marlowe, Jacob's "nephew" and became the C.E.O. of Halo. Later still, he absorbed Void's powers, making him one of the most powerful beings in the Wildstorm Universe. Jack went on to turn away from the role of super-hero, attempting to make the world a better place by introducing highly advanced Kheran technology into human society. At some point, he lost Void's powers. Spartan went on propose to Voodoo in the Carrier. All of Spartan's bodies possess superhuman strength and durability and are capable of flight, generating plasma blasts, and interfacing with electronic systems through the ports in his body.
- Grifter (Cole Cash): A former government operative and member of Team 7, Grifter is a skilled marksman and hand-to-hand combatant. Found by Zealot after gaining Gen-Active psychic abilities as a result of Team 7's exposure to Gen Factor, Zealot helped him recover from the ordeal and taught him how to completely remove his power, as well as bring it back at will. Zealot also trained him in Coda combat techniques, making him the only man ever trained by the Coda. He was the only member of the original team not to use any active post-human powers. Grifter left the team for the first time after Jacob made a pact with Hightower, the man responsible for killing Cole's friend Lonely, leading to his time as a solo agent, chronicled in his two ongoing series. He eventually rejoined the WildC.A.T.s and, over the years, as the team would reform and disband many times, Cole maintained ties to Halo and his teammates, particularly Jack Marlowe. Grifter sustained severe injuries to his legs during a mission, and went on to use a wheelchair for some time, eventually using Ladytron's robotic body as a remote-controlled stand-in in the field. Grifter's powers eventually healed his legs, allowing him to walk once again.
- Zealot (Lady Zannah): A Kherubim and a Coda warrior. Zealot is the former Majestrix of the Coda and helped develop their virtues and practices. She has lived for thousands of years and has had many relationships with both humans and aliens alike. In Khera, Zealot was ordered to breed with Majestros, which she did, resulting in the birth of Savant. However, since bearing a child would change Zealot's social standing and ensure she could never be a warrior ever again, Zealot's mother Harmony convinced her to lie to everyone that the child was stillborn, while Harmony pretended that the child was, in fact, hers. The child was named Kenesha and raised as Zealot's sister, though Kenesha would become best known by the name Savant. Zealot left the Coda, believing they did not follow the order's true precepts, and she would go on to fight against the Coda on multiple occasions. She was part of Team One under the alias Lucy Blaze. Zealot was once in a romantic relationship with Grifter, and the two went on to have various flings over the years. Zealot left the Wildcats and briefly joined Department PSI and co-led WildCORE with Backlash, a half-Kheran and former member of Team 7. In later years, Zealot faked her own death and began hunting Coda on her own, before being brought back to Wildcats.
- Voodoo (Priscilla Kitaen): A telepathic human-Kherubim-Daemonite hybrid ancestry, Voodoo has the ability to see Daemonites who have possessed other beings and remove them from the bodies they have possessed. Voodoo was an exotic dancer before being rescued by the WildC.A.T.s from the Daemonites. She was later trained by Zealot in combat and developed an attraction to Spartan. It was eventually revealed that one of her ancestors, was the result of an attempt to splice a Kherubim with the body of a Daemonite. When the WildC.A.T.s went to Khera, Priscilla discovered that the Kherubim-Daemonite War had ended centuries prior, and was treated as a second-class citizen due to her Daemonite ancestry. Disillusioned with the WildC.A.T.s, and particularly with Zealot and Emp, Pris left the team, journeying to New Orleans, where she studied voodoo magic. Voodoo briefly returned to the WildC.A.T.s, although the team would go on to be disbanded and reformed and, ultimately, after Zealot's apparent death, the team members went their separate ways for what appeared to be the last time. Pris eventually moved in with former teammate Jeremy Stone. Priscilla was targeted by post-human serial killer Samuel Smith, who used his powers to sever both her legs and injure her throat. Priscilla was contacted by a benevolent Daemonite, considered to be a conscientious objector to the Kheran-Daemonite war, who helps her hone her hithertho unknown healing and time dilation powers, allowing Pris to regrow her legs. She went on to date Jeremy, though they eventually broke up. Pris rejoined the Wildcats after the Armageddon event, and soon became romantically involved with Spartan once again. Spartan eventually proposed to her. Aside from her telepathic, healing and time dilation powers, Voodoo is an empath, capable of sensing people's emotions, and has been trained in the use of voodoo magic, being able to commune with and raise the dead, though the first time she attempted the latter, she found herself rapidly drained.
- Maul (Jeremy Stone): A scientist and human/Titanthrope hybrid capable of increasing his size and mass at the cost of his reasoning capability. He eventually discovered he could increase his intelligence by decreasing his body mass, but this proved to be physically depleting.
- Warblade (Reno Bryce): A human/Kherubim hybrid and member of Khera's Shaper's Guild, Warblade can transform his body into liquid metal, and shape himself into a variety of bladed weapons and sharp objects, as well as withstand immense trauma, including massive explosions and exposure to intense heat. Warblade is also an accomplished martial artist. Although a virtual killing machine, Reno also has the soul of an artist, having his sculpted work displayed in major art galleries. While Reno stayed away from the Wildcats for a while, he returned to the team after the Armageddon event.
- Void (Adrianna Tereshkova): She has the ability to see the future and teleport herself and others to anywhere on Earth due to absorbing an Orb of Power. Over time, Void grew distant from humanity and the part of her spirit that was Adrianna moved on to the afterlife. The Void entity existed without any host for a short time, until Noir sabotaged Void's voyage to another dimension, resulting in the Void entity disintegrating. Jack Marlowe then went on to absorb Void's powers before it bonded with paramedic Nikola Hanssen.
- Lord Emp (Jacob Marlowe): A Kherubim lord, Emp has assumed a variety of guises throughout his time on Earth, his best known alias being Jacob Marlowe, owner of the Halo Corporation. Throughout most of Emp's time in the Wildcats, he possessed little control over his powers, mostly serving as the team leader and advisor, usually not going out into the field. Emp eventually began a process known as the Ascension, in which he transformed into a more obvious alien being. In order to finally ascend, Emp needed someone to kill him and eventually was forced to ask Spartan to do so, to which Spartan complied. Emp's final appearance was in the Wildstorm: A Celebration of 25 Years special, in which he contacts and counsels Spartan from beyond.

=== Savant's team ===
A second team was introduced later in the series. They were formed after the original team, rumored to be dead, had left for Khera, the Kherubim homeworld. This unlikely group broke from the WildC.A.T.s usual anti-Daemonite agenda and conducted a proactive war on criminals. This alienated them from many other characters in the Wildstorm universe.

- Mr. Majestic (Lord Majestros): Another Kherubim warlord who is one of four that had been stuck on Earth. Mr. Majestic is a homage to Superman. Much like Superman, Majestic possesses superhuman strength, endurance and speed, is capable of flight and generating heat beams from his eyes. He also possesses telekinesis and the ability to project energy blasts from his hands, and is also a skilled inventor and swordsman.
- Savant (Kenesha): The daughter of Majestic and Zealot (unbeknownst to Savant or Majestic) who was raised as Zealot's sister, Savant is an adventurer and archaeologist who has worked for the Smithsonian and possesses many artifacts of mystic power and advanced technologies, including her Seven-League Boots, which essentially allow their user the power of teleportation, and a tesseract bag which contains an almost infinite amount of objects as well as entire rooms within.
- Condition Red (Max Cash, also known as Max Profitt): Grifter's younger brother, Max Cash had excellent fighting and marksmanship abilities. Max followed Cole's footsteps, becoming a covert operative for International Operations. Max went undercover in a crime family, and went on to kill police officers and take part in hits I.O. did not know about, which Savant used to blackmail him into joining her team. Max left the WildC.A.T.s after being caught in an explosion, partly due to Ladytron's unrequited feelings for him and due to his injury. Max eventually went undercover once again, adopting the alias Max Profitt and joining an organization known as the Puritans, who intended to eradicate all alien life on Earth, becoming romantically involved with a Puritan named Gina DeMedici. He alerted the WildC.A.T.s to the Puritans' threat and re-joined the team, eventually traveling back in time to foil the Puritans' attempt to change history by killing Kherubim and Daemonites during various points in time. After a battle at the time of the Kherubim and Daemonites' initial arrival on Earth, Max was forced to take DeMedici's time travel device, leaving her stranded on Earth centuries before she was born. DeMedici joined a Coda house, and eventually died, asking that the Coda get revenge for her by killing Max. A Coda assassin ambushed Max shortly after his return and gunned him down, killing him. He was resurrected as a zombie for one annual in the second series.
- Tao: An artificial human with peculiar thinking abilities that enables him to be inhumanly persuasive and incredibly intuitive. Tao, as he would eventually be known, joined the WildC.A.T.s and manipulated them into starting a war against post-human criminals to create a post-human army made of the WildC.A.T.s and other super-heroes that he would command. When his manipulations were discovered, Tao attempted to escape, though, eventually, Majestic caught up with and apparently killed him. Tao eventually sent Savant a letter revealing that he had brainwashed the shapeshifter known as Mr. White into assuming his form and believing himself to be Tao, and that it was White who Majestic had apparently killed, while Tao had escaped. He later re-appeared, having founded a worldwide criminal organization that aimed to destabilize human global governments, public institutions, and age-old secret societies, though his plans were foiled by undercover I.O. agent Holden Carver, as well as Tao's second-in-command Miss Misery, John Lynch of Gen^{13} and Grifter.
- Ladytron (Maxine Manchester): A cyborg punk with homicidal tendencies. She was captured by the Wildcats and, through T.A.O.'s reprogramming, convinced to join the team. She admired the cybernetic mercenary Overtkill and was romantically interested in Max Cash, though her interest was not returned. When T.A.O. was revealed as a traitor, he disabled her robotic body and Ladytron was taken to the Church of Gort. She became a nun for this new age cult devoted to robotics but had a falling out with its members because she still contained organic body parts. She ended up with the Wildcats again but was wounded by the serial killer Samuel Smith. The damage was so extensive that Ladytron was shut down. A short stint as Noir's reprogrammed pawn later, Ladytron's mind was downloaded into the Halo mainframe and her body was used by the disabled Grifter as a remote-controlled stand-in.

=== Savant Garde ===
For a time Kenesha would drop out of the hero circuit and return to a life of spelunking for the hidden reliquary, along the way she would assemble her own team of adventurers with Majestros at her side.

- Sheba: A humanoid feline metamorph with tactical probability based powers and no known historical background, she would clash with Savant and co while they were out hunting for artifacts in the Amazon Basin. Little to nothing is known about her other than the fact that she may be related to the Kindred, anthropomorphic animals created by the Gen-Factor. She would later return during the World's End event as a beneficiary to Stormwatch's Paris, who found a perfectly habitual forest which had survived the superhuman cataclysm and later teaming up with the WildC.A.T.s to rebuild their damaged world.
- Mabel Blight: Ace pilot and possibly more than she appears at first glance. Mabel is the closest thing to a best friend Kenesha has in her life, she was the one who got Savant out of her slump after her disastrous stint as leader of the WildC.A.T.s. Mabel is allegedly human with no known superpowers but her partner in crime once stated she'd died several times in the past. Indicating she may have some regenerative or rebirthing abilities.
- Disperse: A human mystic from a different dimension where arcane forces reign supreme, Capri Toriamo used to be a guerrilla freedom fighter who stood against the tyranny of many overlords in his world of magic. After having dealt with Tapestry, his mother, an alternate counterpart of Katrina Kupertino; would encourage him to leave their war torn Earth to travel with Savant's group for a time. Disperse is a mage with vast shape shifting abilities that enable him to take on the form and abilities of whomever or whatever he's mimicking. He was last seen aiding in the battle against the Knight of Khera after the World's End event.
- Cybernary (Katrina Kupertino/Yumiko Gamorra): A powerful next-gen bionic hunter-killer spawned on the lawless Island Gamorra. Katrina was a low rent street hustler who traded her life and her humanity for her best friend Cisco's freedom, now sharing the consciousness of the despot Kaizen Gamorra's daughter; Yumiko Gamorra, they live in a tumultuous union body and mind as they travel the world with the newfound companions. Cybernary has several retrofitted abilities thanks to her cybernetic enhancements. Such as a tactical computer, enhanced physicals pertaining to strength, speed, resilience and stamina, she's even able to secrete mind controlling pheromones that enable her to influence peoples directives. The personality governing Yumiko's consciousness can initiate a doomsday virus dispersal system which would blanket the world in water catalyzing agent which will kill-off all non cyber life. Cybernary would act as an adversary to the Authority after the World's End calamity while working under her hated father Kaizen when he attacked them. Then became a subsidiary under Zannah's new Coda training grounds after her bionics were removed and then (allegedly) replenished after the Knights of Khera battle.
- Miranda: A cyber-shrink who helped Katrina/Yumiko through their gestalt identity crisis after having been reactivated by her deranged creator. She would escape Gamorra along with Cybernary while the nation devolved into civil conflict just before the Fire From Heaven event to act as Met-L's caretaker and pilot.
- Met-L (Albert Kaplan): Once a criminal underworld degenerate under the surname of Cisco, Albert was the partner of Katrina before she became a transorganic cyber assassin. A bupkis job led to Cisco's incarceration in a Gamorran hunter killer manufacturing facility where his partner came to rescue him while he lay on the table. After she gave her life in exchange for his freedom, Katrina was later cheated and Cisco was secretly remodeled into an animal themed hunter killer cyborg for gladiatorial entertainment for Gamorra's denizens. Cybernary would do battle with and ultimately dispatch of the aberration that was once her trusted confidante, but she managed to save a hard-copy of Mr. Kaplan's persona and have his mental engrams imprinted on a Multi-Environmental Transformation-Laborer Class automaton; Met-L for short.

=== Time travel team ===
The team consisted of Grifter, Max Cash, Void, and an old Spartan unit activated by Grifter, possessing Hadrian's original personality, as well as new members:

- Mythos: A powerful mystic and Kherubim lord, Mythos possesses super-human physical attributes, particularly strength and speed, being capable of moving so fast normal humans cannot see him.
- Olympia: A Daemonite mercenary who has Coda training. She took in a teenager named Kai as her ward. When Max Cash was killed by a Coda warrior, Olymbia broke into her cell and killed the Coda, an act which led Jacob to kick her out of the team and inform her that, as long as she kept away from the WildC.A.T.s, the team would not seek to apprehend her. She was killed by a resurrected Max during the Devil's Night crossover.
- Sister Eve: A former nun who lived in a convent in South Bend, who, unbeknownst to herself, was Lord Entropy's daughter. She can generate a "chaos field", allowing her to break molecular bonds and generate destructive energy. She can only control her power by wearing a pair of inhibiting gloves and a dampening cloak. Eve was killed after using all her power to stop an avalanche from hitting the other members of the team.

=== Halo Team ===
After a disastrous mission wherein Zealot faked her death to hunt down the earth Coda chapter. The Cat's, whittled down to Jacob and Spartan, would go on to recruit both old faces and new blood after Lord Emp had ascended.

- Noir: A French arms dealer whom would offer his expertise to the Halo Corporation, for a price. Later killed by Jacob's successor Jack Marlowe, a.k.a. Spartan, when the treacherous individual tried to usurp the company for acquisition of its access to Otherspace using a retrofit of Maxine Manchester's inert remains to kill his employer and employing French hitmen to do away with Cole Cash.
- Anthony Pacheco: A captain of the Los Angeles Police Force's C.R.A.S.H. Department seeking Jack Marlowe's aid of in dealing with a local drug baron selling and dealing on the mean streets of his precinct. Despite having easily removed the narco's distributing the metabolic and cognitive perception booster called Hype, officer Pacheco was revealed to've partaken of the narcotic himself. Jack chose to trust the good samaritan's judgement while leaving the production facilities behind in his care regardless.

=== 3.0 cast ===
Besides Grifter and Jack Marlowe, the main characters were:

- Grifter II (Edwin Dolby): Jack Marlowe's main accountant and right-hand man in the Halo Corporation. When Grifter's legs were seriously injured in a mission, Cole brought him up to speed about Halo's more exotic exploits with the intent of training Dolby to be his replacement after learning of Dolby's natural aptitude for marksmanship. Dolby, however, refused to kill. Despite this, Dolby was sent on a mission, during which he panicked and accidentally crippled a man. He suffered a mental breakdown and quit Halo, but Marlowe was able to convince him to return by reinforcing his belief in the success of Halo's mission. In an attempt to end his nightmares over the mission, he agrees to help Grifter and his team rescue Zealot from the Coda.
- Agent Orange: Another mole of Jack Marlowe's, this time at the FBI. Agent Orange is an enhanced human who can be mentally programmed for certain tasks. Said operative's blood had been replaced by the compound dioxin bestowing superhuman strength, durability, healing and endurance. Never speaking or showing any emotion, Agent Orange is quite similar in appearance and behavior to the Terminator. Whilst Grifter meets with Maul in Miami, Orange is sent out by the FBI alongside agents Cave and Cartman to dispatch them both but was undone when a Central Intelligence Agency program gained sentience and aided them by sending Orange a shutdown code. Later when Cole and his team get in over their heads while attempting to rescue Zealot from the Coda, Marlowe activates Agent Orange, who finds Zealot and brings her to Grifter's team.
- Ramon: A eugenically enhanced tween intellect born from a testing beaker in the services of the underworld affiliate Cecelia Rendozzo. After Marlowe's people did his employer a hefty service, Ramon would aid grifter with a neural uplink system which would enable him to go on field missions using Ladytron's inert mechanical body as a proxy for field missions. He and C.C's son are constantly at odds with one another.
- Sam Garfield: A secondary accountant and partner to Edwin Dolby working their own business firm until it was purchased by Mr. Marlowe. While infinitely less accommodating to the rather abrupt methods of managing their services as his business associate. Being rather surprised at how nonchalantly Mr. Dolby went along with their new bosses micromanagement, offering advice on topics they usually don't cover due to being middle management for money. A sense of tension that came to a head when after Marlowe had reassigned him to a whole new business firm which was secretly a shell company to front the Central Intelligence Agency's clandestine operations. Something that Jack brings to his attention after Mr. Garfield runs afoul with the law after an altercation with a road hog, his employer covering up for Sam's act of first degree murder; the accountant comes around to working as Spartan's mole within the C.I.A and continues managing his new assets with a newfound calm and perspective afterwards.
- Agent Wax: Jack Marlowe's contact at the National Park Service, a government agency tasked with monitoring superhuman activity. Wax is gifted with strong hypnotic powers, but his superiors never knew of this. He became aware of the C.A.T.s while following up leads on a superhuman serial killer in the second volume of Wildcats. Later quitting the Service after the death of his partner, despite this he never lost interest in Marlowe and his team even before later returning to NPS on the formers suggestion. Wax had often been bullied by his boss, Agent Downs; even before he left the bureau. His C.O. often forcing him into undergoing demeaning and/or aggravating tasks such as taking on a new partner; as well as forcing Wax to a desk job when he returned. The bemoaned agent would enact revenge by using his meta abilities to engage in a sexual affair with his superiors' obnoxious spouse after being slatted as her personal chofer. Wax ended up killing his superior Downs when the latter angled his employee into a confrontation in a secluded location with his wife tied up; an event said operator would disguise as a field assignment. Using his unique skills Agent Wax would then impersonate his deceased employer, effectively taking over the NPS later on to keep up appearances. Marlowe found out about this turn of events yet decided to give him a second chance seeing such happenstance as an opportunity to broaden Halo Corps. reach through the Park Service's assets and ties to the social power structure.
- The Beef Boys: Two remarkably, possibly superhumanly, strong men dressed in S&M fetish gear. Apart from running a BDSM club, they are also mercenaries who work for Grifter from time to time. The taller of the two, Glenn, never speaks, while the other, Cedric, is quite eloquent. Glenn was killed by the Coda while on mission.
- C. C. Rendozzo: A scientific criminal mastermind, ace gunman and powerful information broker who knows a great deal bout many critical plot points in the Wildstorm Universe. She's the employer of Ramon; introduced after initially having come after Jeremy Stone due to the former's genius work in genetic isolation and extrapolation. Having contracted a form of doomsday virus while tinkering with it for sales purposes, Cecelia would later turn up looking for an FBI agent to use as ransom for a personal matter, enlisting both Cole and Wax's aid when they initially crossed paths. Later seeking to blackmail Jack Marlowe by using his alien origin as leverage after the initial mission went sideways. In return for her silence after giving Cecelia what she desired, she would act as an underworld contact whom Marlowe would keep in touch with; Grifter having called in a favor of her in helping rescue Zannah from the earthborn Coda Chapter she'd been attacking as of late.

=== Majestic's pact ===
While not specifically part of any WildC.A.T.s group, Mister Majestic would work with his own covert action team for a time when the Shapers Guild would attempt seize earth's Kherubim terraforming engine to make a new Khera. Members would include mainstays like Spartan, Zealot and Savant while also including:

- Desmond: Longtime sidekick and child super genius aide to Majestros in his earlier years, after his friend went on to become a Universal; a conclave of super celestials whom Majestros's father was a part of. Desmond would go onto create his own xenotechnological sales company called Quickthink Incorporated, a business industry which reverse engineers and amalgamates kherubim technology into human engineering.
- Lady Harmony: A high Priestess of the Kherubim Coda sect known as the Skein and the mother of Zeolot.
- Imperator: Rival Kherubim Lord and advocate of House Khull on the Pantheon, aiding Harmony and her forces to stand against the rogue shaper sect's incursion of Earth. His true goal was to take the Shaper Engine in the name of his family house to lord over the failing Khera.
- Lord Helspont: Long standing enemy and bitterest rival to the Kheran sanctioned WildC.A.T.s. The Daemon Royal would offer his services in aid against the Shaper's Guild for his own agendas.

=== Nemesis Crew ===
The introduction of rogue Kherubum warrior Lady Charis would be first adversarial too, then join up with a team consisting of Majestros, Zannah, Cole Cash and Kenesha. A team which would later be adjourned by former WildC.A.T.s mainstays such as Jeremy, Reno and Priscilla while battling the mutated human forces of the Brotherhood of the Sword.

- Nemesis: A Coda warrior and former lover of Majestic. Having been framed by Raven and the Brotherhood of the Blade, who collaborated with like-minded Daemonites to overthrow their masters back home to conquer the galaxy, she would be hunted and hated by her former compatriots as a traitor to the Kheran war effort for eons till modern day. When the Brotherhood began their assault, transforming humans into posthuman warriors for their cause.

=== "World's End" ===
With the "World's End" crossover, original Wildcats Spartan, Zealot, Voodoo, Grifter, Maul, Nemesis and Warblade were brought together again to help save what was left of the human race. Their membership also included Ladytron as well as a few new members:

- Backlash (real name Jodi Slayton, formerly known as Jet): The daughter of the original Backlash. She possesses superhuman speed and reflexes.

Nemesis subsequently went missing following the teams battle with Majestic, while Savant rejoined the team.

=== "Infinite Frontier" ===
- Fairchild (Caitlin Fairchild)
- Deathblow (Michael Cray)

== Creative teams ==
=== Volume 1 ===
- 0: Jim Lee (Plot), Brandon Choi (Script), Brett Booth (Art)
- 1–9: Jim Lee (plot, art), Brandon Choi (script)
- 10–13: Chris Claremont (writer), Jim Lee (artist)
- 14: Erik Larsen (writer, artist)
- 15–20: James Robinson (writer), Travis Charest, Jim Lee (artists)
- 21–34: Alan Moore (writer), Travis Charest, Jim Lee, Mat Broome and others (artists)
- 35–36: Barbara Kesel (writer), Pascual Ferry, Rich Johnson and Carlos D'Anda (artists)
- 37–49: Brandon Choi, Jonathan Peterson (co-plotters), Mat Broome, Ed Benes and others (artists)
- 50: James Robinson, Brandon Choi & Jonathan Peterson, Alan Moore (writers), Jim Lee, Ed Benes, Travis Charest (artists)
- Special 1: Steve Gerber (writer), Travis Charest (artist)
- Annual 1: James Robinson (writer), Larry Stroman (artist)

=== Volume 2 ===
- 1–7: Scott Lobdell, Joe Casey (co-plotters), Travis Charest and others (artists)
- 8–28: Joe Casey (writer), Sean Phillips, Steve Dillon (artists)

=== Volume 3.0 ===
- 1–15: Joe Casey (writer), Dustin Nguyen, Richard Friend (artists)
- 16: Joe Casey (writer), Francisco Ruiz Velasco, Sean Phillips (artists)
- 17: Joe Casey (writer), Francisco Ruiz Velasco (artists)
- 18: Joe Casey (writer), Pascual Ferry, Sandra Hope (artists)
- 19-24: Joe Casey (writer), Duncan Rouleau, John Dell (artists)

=== Volume 4 ===
- 1: Grant Morrison (plot), Jim Lee (art).

=== Volume 5 ===
- 1–12: Christos Gage (writer), Neil Googe, Pete Woods (art).
- 13–18: Christos Gage (writer), Shawn Moll (art).
- 19–30: Adam Beechen (writer), Tim Seeley (art).

=== Volume 6 ===
- 1-12 Matthew Rosenberg (writer), Stephen Segovia, Tom Derenick (art)

== Collected editions ==
Trade paperback and hardcover collections:

- Absolute WildC.A.T.s by Jim Lee (2018) —Collects vol. 1 #1-13 and #50, Cyberforce vol. 2 #1-3, WildCATs vol. 4 #1 and WildC.A.T.s/X-Men: The Silver Age (ISBN 978-1401274955)
  - WildC.A.T.s: Covert Action Teams: Compendium (ISBN 1563895870) (1993)—Collects vol. 1 #1–4
  - WildC.A.T.s/Cyberforce: Killer Instinct (2004)—Collects vol. 1 #5–7 and Cyberforce vol. 2 #1–3 (ISBN 1401203221)
  - WildC.A.T.s: A Gathering of Eagles—Collects vol. 1 #10–13 (ISBN 978-1-56389-585-2) (1997)
- WildC.A.T.s Compendium One (2024) —Collects vol. 1 #0-13 and 15-20; Team One: WildCATs #1-2, Team One: StormWatch #1-2, WildCATs: Covert Action Teams Special #1, WildCATs Trilogy #1-3, WildCATs Sourcebook #1-2, and Cyberforce vol. 2 #1-3 (ISBN 978-1779526021)
- WildC.A.T.s: Trilogy—Collects mini-series #1–3 (2000)
- James Robinson's Complete WildC.A.T.s (ISBN 1401222048)—Collects vol. 1 #15–20, Annual #1, and Team One/WildC.A.T.S. (January 2009)
- Alan Moore's Complete WildC.A.T.s—Collects vol. 1 #21–34 and #50
  - WildC.A.T.s: Homecoming—Collects vol. 1 #21–27 (ISBN 156389582X) (first printing, 1998; second printing 1999)
  - WildC.A.T.s: Gang War—Collects vol. 1 #28–34 (ISBN 1-58240-037-7) (first printing, November 1998; second printing, May 1999)
- Alan Moore's Wild Worlds—Collects Spawn/Wildcats #1–4, Voodoo #1–4, Voodoo: Dancing in the Dark, Deathblow: By Blows #1–3, Wildcats #50, Wildstorm Spotlight #1 ISBN 1401213790
- Wildcats: Street Smart—Collects vol. 2 #1–6
- Wildcats: Vicious Circles—Collects vol. 2 #8–13
- Wildcats: Serial Boxes—Collects vol. 2 #14–19
- Wildcats: Battery Park—Collects vol. 2 #20–28
- Wildcats 3.0 Year One—Collects vol. 3 #1–12

- Wildcats Version 3.0: Brand Building—Collects vol. 3 #1–6
- Wildcats Version 3.0: Full Disclosure—Collects vol. 3 #7–12

- Wildcats 3.0 Year Two—Collects vol. 3 #13–24
- Wildcats: Nemesis—Collects Wildcats: Nemesis #1–9
- Wildcats: World's End—Collects vol. 5 #1–6, ISBN 1-4012-2363-X
- Wildcats: Family Secrets—Collects vol. 5 #7–12, ISBN 1-4012-2668-X
- WildC.A.T.S, Vol. 1: Better Living Through Violence HC - collects vol. 6 #1-6, Batman: Urban Legends #6, and Wildstorm 30th Anniversary Special ISBN 978-1779518347

Vol. 1 #14 is collected in Savage Dragon Vol. 4: Possessed as it was done by Erik Larsen as part of Image X Month; #20 is also collected in the Wildstorm Rising trade paperback, while JLA/WildC.A.T.s is collected in the JLA: Ultramarine Corps trade.

Both WildC.A.T.S Covert Action Teams: Compendium and A Gathering of Eagles are out of print. New printings of the trade paperbacks WildC.A.T.s: Homecoming and WildC.A.T.s: Gang War were published in 1999 after the late 1998 acquisition of WildStorm Productions by DC Comics; as of 2009, both volumes have now sold out and are currently out of print. In August 2007 Alan Moore's Complete WildC.A.T.S TPB was released, containing the contents of both Gang War and Homecoming TPBs, as well as the short story from WildC.A.T.S #50.

== Reception ==
Andy Butcher reviewed the first graphic novel compendium of WildC.A.T.s: Covert Action Teams for Arcane magazine, rating it a 6 out of 10 overall. Butcher comments that "of all the artists who've tried to write, Lee is one of the more successful. Despite some confusing flashbacks at the start, he is at least capable of stringing a story together. As long as you concentrate (a lot of characters and factions are introduced very quickly), it's an enjoyable if fairly linear tale. And of course, the art is simply stunning."

== In other media ==
=== TV series ===
A Wild C.A.T.s TV series was created in 1994. It had only thirteen episodes and a more family-friendly storyline. As a result, there were numerous changes from the source material, such as Voodoo being an adolescent rather than an ex-stripper and Lord Emp being an ordinary human. The group was composed of all the original 'C.A.T.s. The major villain was Helspont, but the Troika and the Coda were featured. A parody of the series, MadD.O.G.s, was seen during Alan Moore's run in the comics. The series was produced by Nelvana Limited and WildStorm Productions.

=== Toyline ===
A toyline from Playmates Toys was also released in 1994. The basic series included figures of Grifter, Helspont, Maul, Spartan, Warblade and Zealot, along with a generic Daemonite figure. In 1995, new versions of Helspont, Maul, Spartan, Warblade, and Zealot were released, along with figures of Pike, Void, and Voodoo, and a WildC.A.T.S. Bullet Bike accessory. In addition, Playmates also produced "giant" versions of Grifter, Maul, and Spartan, plus figures for other characters in the Image Universe, such as Black Razor, Mr. Majestic, and Slag.

=== Video game ===
In 1995, Playmates Interactive Entertainment published a WildC.A.T.s video game exclusively for the Super NES. A WildC.A.T.s game for Sega Genesis was planned but never released.
