= Mr. Majestic =

- Mr. Majestic cover

Publication information
- Publisher: WildStorm (Image Comics, later DC Comics)
- First appearance: WildC.A.T.s #11 (June 1994)
- Created by: H. K. Proger (writer); Jim Lee (artist)

In-story information
- Alter ego: Lord Majestros
- Species: Kherubim
- Team affiliations: WildC.A.T.s
- Notable aliases: Jim McArest; Mister Cape; Majestic
- Abilities: Superhuman strength, stamina, endurance, speed, agility, reflexes, intelligence, and senses; Energy manipulation; Ice breath; Flight; Psychokinesis; Invulnerability; Immortality

Mr. Majestic (Lord Majestros) is a Wildstorm Productions comic book superhero created by writer H. K. Proger with artist Jim Lee. He first appeared in a backup story within WildC.A.T.s #11. He is the most powerful hero in the WildStorm universe and bears a strong resemblance to DC's Superman.

== Publication history ==
Mr. Majestic was created by H.K. Proger and Jim Lee, first appearing in WildC.A.T.s #11, cover dated June 1994.

When Jim Lee was asked why he based Mr. Majestic so much on Superman, he stated that he was tired of seeing so many comic heroes who possessed great power but were too afraid to use it. Mr. Majestic possesses powers similar to those of Superman, but his personality is entirely different. Majestros has more militant views, as he is a Kheran warlord. The difference between the two is further portrayed when Majestros finds himself stuck on Superman's Earth. The two have a conversation about Majestic's no-nonsense, all-business personality and Superman's more subtle approach to things. Subjects they discuss include the fact that Majestic put superhuman villains in prison without giving them a fair trial and getting into bouts with that world's heroes, claiming he finds them dismayingly reticent.

== Fictional character biography ==
Mr. Majestic, born Majestros on the planet Khera, was a Kherubim warlord. He has two children, Kenesha and Majestrate. Due to widespread infertility among Kherubim, resulting in even fertile women being able to bear only one child, fertile Kherubim deemed compatible would be made to breed, and so Majestros and the Coda warrior Lady Zannah (who would go on to become Zealot, a founding member of the Wildcats) were chosen, and Zannah become pregnant. Since Coda warriors would become priestesses if they gave birth, and Zannah wished to remain a warrior, her mother, Harmony, pretended the child, Kenesha, was stillborn, and then claimed to have become pregnant and given birth, passing Kenesha off as her daughter, Zannah's sister. Only Zannah and Harmony were aware that Kenesha was Zannah's daughter.

Majestic was one of the four Kherubim lords trapped on Earth during the Kherubim/Daemonite war. It is later revealed that he took his son with him on this journey (see Majestrate below). During the days of the Roman Empire, Majestic became romantically involved with a human woman named Rebecca, his only known relationship with a human, or with anyone since arriving on Earth, since Majestic believes that humans are a lower life form compared to the Kherubim, and that a relationship of any kind would weaken him in his fight against the Daemonites.

He spent centuries fighting for justice, eventually revealing his existence to the public, becoming the only known post-human hero for a time, and went on to join the government-sponsored Team One. While the team was fighting Lord Helspont and the Cabal, his friend, teammate, and fellow Kherubim Yon Kohl (known as the adventurer John Colt), was ambushed by a group of Daemonites. Colt convinced Majestic to kill him and the Daemonites to achieve their mission objective and save New York City from a nuclear attack. This event caused him to seek solitude in the Arctic.

At some point, Majestic created a headquarters for himself by hollowing Mount Rushmore and building a base inside it, known as the Rushmore Sanctuary.

Years after killing John Colt, Savant approached Majestic and asked him to help Zealot in her battle with Tapestry. And thus, Mr. Majestic made his return.

After most of the original WildC.A.T.s were sent to Khera and presumed dead, Majestic and Savant formed a new WildC.A.T.s team dedicated to performing surgical strikes on the post-human underworld. The team was manipulated by one of their own, Tao, into taking part in a war against post-human criminals, and Majestic appeared to kill Tao, although it would eventually be revealed that it was, in fact, shapeshifter Mr. White, who had been brainwashed into believing he was Tao and assuming his form.

Savant and Majestic went on to leave the WildC.A.T.s, and shortly afterwards proceeded to go on an expedition in Peru, accompanied by Savant's best friend Mabel Bligh. The expedition ended up leading Majestic, Savant, and Mabel to meet and befriend several post-humans, including Sheba, Cybernary, Met-L, and Disperse, forming the short-lived group Savant Garde.

== Solo series ==
In 2003, Wildstorm published a series called Mr. Majestic. In this series, it is revealed that Majestic did not spend the majority of his time after Team One in solitude, but rather as a government agent taking on paranormal anomalies with the aid of a gifted boy named Desmond. In the issues of this comic, much is revealed about Majestic's time after the Cold War, as his adventures span from the late 1960s to the early 2000s. When he is flung into Metropolis by Daemonite technology and a time storm, Majestros takes on the alias of Jim McArest (an anagram of "Mr. Majestic"), as he had suffered amnesia from the interdimensional trip. In 2005, Majestic (with the aid of Superman) returned to the WildStorm universe in an ongoing solo-series titled Majestic.

In Mr. Majestic #4, it was revealed that Majestros has a son named Majestrate whom he took along from Khera (although the mother is not mentioned). Majestrate's body did not survive the crash landing, but his mind was preserved in a crystal. Majestic obtained a substance called "starstuff" from another dimension in order to transfer his son's mind into a new artificial body. The reunion was one of the rare occasions Majestic showed any emotion. The joy that both father and son experienced would, however, be short-lived. The fact that starstuff was in another dimension caused an interdimensional imbalance, an imbalance that tried to correct itself by manifesting in Australia in a man named Freddie Noondyke. It would soon become apparent that for the imbalance to be corrected, the starstuff in Majestrate's body would have to be returned, thus ending the boy's life. Majestic would hear nothing of it at first until his son convinced him that it was the right thing to do. Majestrate flew into the dimensional maelstrom and brought the imbalance to an end. When Majestic flew down, he found the metal skeleton of the artificial body. The result of this loss led to Majestros being in a depressed mood for quite some time.

== Powers and abilities ==
Majestic possesses immense strength. Majestic is capable of enduring massive damage, such as the explosion of a small nuclear reactor, without sustaining any permanent injuries. He can move many times faster than the speed of sound, and can fly. Majestic can also generate heat beams from his eyes, survive in outer space, has a genius level intellect, possesses micro vision, ice breath, accelerated healing, and invulnerability to conventional weaponry. Majestic's strength and durability vary from appearance to appearance.

Majestic also appears to have some powers he uses less frequently, such as the ability to generate energy blasts from his hands that were powerful enough to match Union's own energy blast, and telekinesis.

Majestros is a genius, able to design and construct highly complex devices within a matter of seconds, analyze a situation and come up with the proper solution, and find weaknesses in enemies. Majestic is also a skilled warrior, especially in the use of bladed weapons. He's a particularly skilled swordsman, having defeated Coda warriors in sword fights.

Majestic did not begin life at these power levels and it is revealed in the Backlash and Wildcore series that he was altered by the alien race known as the D'rahn, who have the power to evolve beings to achieve powerful potentials.

Superhumans in the WildStorm Universe are apparently categorized into named "classes". Some of the most powerful being in the Wildstorm Universe, such as Apollo and The High are considered "Majestic-Class superhumans", presumably a class based on Majestros himself.

Majestic's costume includes, hidden in its shoulderpads, additional equipment that Majestic has used on occasion, including a nanoflage suit, which seems to confer some degree of invisibility; a quantum-folded combat blade, a collapsable sword made by Khera's Shaper's Guild; and a damper capsule, which suppresses all of his powers for three hours and has the side effect of masking his Kherubim aura, hiding him from sensors that are looking for such aura signatures.

== In other media ==
=== Animation ===
Majestic appears in the Wild C.A.T.s animated series, voiced by Rod Wilson.

=== Miscellaneous ===
Mister Majestic is featured in the Smallville Season 11 digital comic based on the TV series. In this continuity, Kal-El takes on the identity of Mister Majestic, rather than Superman, and is later killed during the Monitors' invasion. His Earth's Lois Lane and a handful of other survivors are assisted by Earth-1's Superman and Lois, and eventually transported to another reality by Jor-El.
