= Zealot (Wildstorm) =

- Zealot as she appeared in Zealot #2. Art by Terry Shoemaker.

Publication information
- Publisher: WildStorm (Image Comics, later DC Comics)
- First appearance: WildC.A.T.s #1 (August 1992)
- Created by: Jim Lee; Brandon Choi

In-story information
- Alter ego: Lady Zannah
- Place of origin: Khera
- Team affiliations: WildC.A.T.s; Coda Sisterhood; Wildcore; International Operations; Birds of Prey
- Notable aliases: Lucy Blaze; Constance; White Ghost
- Abilities: Expertly adept at hand-to-hand weapons; Excellent marksman with both firearms and thrown weapons; Melee armament expert; Possesses powerful psi talents; Espionage mastery; Teleportation; Enhanced strength, durabilty, and healing factor to the point of near-immortality; Possesses a good amount of knowledge in black magic.

Zealot (Lady Zannah) is a superhero who has appeared in American comic books published by Wildstorm Productions and DC Comics. Created by artist Jim Lee and writer Brandon Choi, she first appeared in WildC.A.T.s #1 (August 1992), as a member of that titular superhero team, during the period when Wildstorm and its properties were owned by Jim Lee.

== Publication history ==
=== Wildstorm Comics ===
Lady Zannah debuted in WildC.A.T.s #1 (August 1992). As a member of the WildCATS, Lady Zannah also appeared in a number of crossover stories within the Wildstorm Universe. In this incarnation, Zealot is a long-lived warrior belonging to a nearly-immortal ancient alien race known as the Kherubim, and is a member of the Coda Sisterhood, a group of Amazonian-like/ninja-like warriors from planet Khera.

From August to December, 1995, the character starred in her own solo series, which briefly ran for three issues. The series was written by Ron Marz, penciled by Terry Shoemaker, and inked by Jon Holdredge and John Tighe. The covers of the series were designed by both Jon Holdredge, and Terry Shoemaker.

=== DC Comics ===
In 1999, Lee sold Wildstorm to DC Comics, and ownership of all Wildstorm characters, including Zealot, transferred to DC Comics. Since the transition to DC, the character (along with the majority of the Wildstorm characters) has remained largely unused over the following years, despite appearing as a supporting character in the second volume of Deathstroke, as well as a few appearances in the DC Universe version of Stormwatch. However, in March 2021, it was hinted that Zealot may soon appear alongside Grifter in Batman: Urban Legends, which is part of the Infinite Frontier relaunch of the DC Universe. Both characters did appear separately.

== Fictional character biography ==
=== Coda Sisterhood ===
Zealot is a proud warrior from planet Khera who has lived thousands of years, waging a very long war against the Daemonites. She has experienced relationships with both humans and aliens. The Kherubim-Daemonite war spread across the galaxy, eventually involving Earth when Daemonite and Kherubim ships crash-landed on the planet. Zealot survived the crash, later forming an Earth chapter sisterhood of warriors called the Coda, whose mission was to stop the Daemonites from conquering the planet.

Centuries later, the Coda would be revived in response to increased Daemonite activity. Zealot being the former Majestrix of the Coda Sisterhood, helped developed their virtues and practices. Despite the virtues and practices of the Coda being strictly between the women in the Khera race, mating however was enforced, due to the high infertility rate among the men and women of the Kherubim race. Zannah was paired with another Kherubim named Majestros, resulting in the birth of a daughter. However, because it is forbidden for Kherubim women to be both mothers and warriors, Zealot's mother Harmony convinced her to lie to everyone that the child was stillborn, while Harmony pretended that the child was hers, raising it as Zealot's sister. The child was named Kenesha, although Kenesha would become best known by the name Savant.

As time went on, Zannah realized that the Coda Sisterhood began to stray from its true ways and precepts, and decided to leave. However, leaving the Coda Sisterhood is forbidden, which made Zealot marked for death. She would then go on to fight against the Coda on multiple occasions, while continuing to wage war on the Daemonites and wandering the Earth.

=== Team One ===
Sometime afterwards in the 1960s, she joined Team One under the alias Lucy Blaze, aiding fellow Kherubim survivors Lord Emp, Majestros, and John Colt in the battle against Helspont, a Daemonite Lord and his Cabal army. Using an army of post-humans and Daemonites, Helspont attempted to destroy all of humanity using nuclear missiles, so the Daemonites could rule the earth. However, Team One emerged victorious and disbanded shortly after.

It was also during this time that Zannah would form a brief relationship with John Colt and have a second child, a son. Continuing her life-long dedication to the path of a warrior, she then gives the child to a Siberian family for the child's protection. The child would later become Stormwatch member Winter, who remained unaware of his true parentage, due to Zealot ultimately choosing to let go of her past.

=== WildCATs ===
Zealot would soon meet a man would become known as Grifter, and the two went on to have an unusual relationship over the following years. Wanting to see Grifter overcome his traumas and tragedies, she decided to teach him the ways of the Coda that she had once belonged to - despite the tradition that only women should receive the Coda knowledge. Her Coda-teachings stabilized Cole's sanity and removed what remained of his psionic powers. Cole and Zealot waged a war against members of the Daemonite race, and would join the WildCATs.

Around the time of joining the WildCATs, Zealot and Grifter ended their relationship, but mutually agreed to remain as partners. However, Cole still loved Zealot, even though he was unwilling to rekindle their relationship, thinking it would only bring him pain.

=== WildCORE ===
Zealot left the Wildcats and briefly joined Department PSI and co-led Wildcore with Backlash, a half-Kheran and former member of Team 7. The team was assembled by Department PSI-director Antonio Giovanni to fight against the D'rahn, a long-missing alien race who are ancient enemies of the Kherubim and Daemonites. The D'rahn have appeared again after a millennium of absence, seeking revenge against the Kherubim, and are planning on taking over the world and the galaxy. After defeating the D'rahn with aid from Mr Majestic, Zealot find herself facing her former master, Tapestry, who attempts to enslave her again by way of magic. The Wildcore team emerges victorious, and Zealot leaves the group afterwards.

In later years, Zealot faked her own death and began hunting Coda on her own, before being brought back to Wildcats.

== Powers and abilities ==
Given the centuries lifespan of Kherans, Zannah has studied and mastered many styles of both armed and unarmed combat. Telepathy, teleportation, and accelerated healing are some of the abilities that she possess. As a member of the Kheran race, she has enhanced strength, stamina, reflexes, and durability which extend far beyond the peak of human beings. Although Lady Zannah favors bladed weapons following the Coda tradition, she is also highly proficient with firearms, given her centuries of experience in warfare.

Zannah also has a good amount of knowledge in dark magic, which was taught to her while spending a century of her lifetime serving a witch known as Tapestry. However, she tries not to rely on it much, for it corrupts the soul of the user. Ironically, the use of dark magic is what allowed her to later defeat Tapestry in a decisive battle.

== In other media ==
Zealot appears in the animated series Wild C.A.T.s, voiced by Roscoe Handford. Given the family-friendly nature of the show, the character's violent and ruthless aspects were toned down. However, her feelings towards Grifter and backstory with the Coda Sisterhood remained intact.
