= Grifter (character) =

Superhero appearing in DC Comics

- Promotional art for Grifter (vol. 3) #1 (September 2011); Art by Cafu and Bit

Publication information
- Publisher: WildStorm (Image Comics, later DC Comics)
- First appearance: WildC.A.T.s #1 (August 1992)
- Created by: Jim Lee; Brandon Choi

In-story information
- Alter ego: Cole Cash
- Team affiliations: WildC.A.T.s; Team 7 The Authority; International Operations
- Notable aliases: Deadeye
- Abilities: Highly skilled martial artist; Expert marksman; Psionics (usually either dormant or passive); Telekinesis; Telepathy; Accelerated healing factor; Espionage mastery; Extended longevity

Grifter (Cole Cash) is a superhero appearing in American comic books published by Wildstorm Productions and DC Comics. Created by artist Jim Lee and writer Brandon Choi, he first appeared in WildC.A.T.s #1 (August 1992), as a member of that titular superhero team, during the period when Wildstorm and its properties were owned by Jim Lee. In that incarnation, Grifter is a former government operative and member of the military unit Team 7 and the espionage agency International Operations.

In 1999, Lee sold Wildstorm to DC Comics, and ownership of all Wildstorm characters, including Grifter, transferred to DC Comics. His history and continuity remained the same however, until DC's 2011 relaunch of their entire comics line, The New 52, which rebooted the continuity for most of its characters. Since then, the character has starred in his own DC series, and has also made appearances in numerous other DC titles, such as Voodoo, Legion Lost, Team 7, Animal Man and Deathstroke.

The character has been voiced by Colin O'Meara in Wild C.A.T.s, and Danny Jacobs in Justice League: The Flashpoint Paradox.

== Publication history ==
The character debuted in WildC.A.T.S. #1 (August 1992). He was later a major character in the original Team 7 miniseries. In 1997, co-creator Brandon Choi picked this mini-series as his favorite Grifter story, explaining, "I really enjoyed [writer] Chuck Dixon's portrayal of the team members, especially Cole. He really wove Cole's background into the whole Team 7 story in a very believable fashion." *

In May 1995, the character starred in his own solo series, which was concluded in March 1996 with a total of ten issues. A second solo series ran from July 1996 to August 1997, with a total of 14 issues. The character also starred in the five-issue mini-series Point Blank.

In June 2011, DC Comics announced that Grifter would be incorporated into the DC Universe in a new ongoing series written by Nathan Edmondson and drawn by CAFU as part of its September 2011 relaunch of its comics properties. Beginning with Grifter #9 in May 2012, series writer Nathan Edmondson was replaced with Rob Liefeld. The title concluded in issue #16.

== Fictional character biography ==
=== Team 7 ===
From a young age, Cole Cash took part in his con man father Jacob Winston "Win" Cash's various grifts, until Cole witnessed his father's apparent murder at the hands of mobster Sam Del Gracci. Cole's mother went on to marry Del Gracci who regularly beat Cole, while also doting on Cole's younger brother Max. As a teenager, Cole ran away from home and became the getaway driver for a crew of robbers. When his fellow criminals turned violent, Cole intervened, saving the life of F.B.I. agent Joseph Brockmeyer. He was apprehended, and Brockmeyer gave him the choice of either joining the clandestine agency known as International Operations or go to jail. Cole joined I.O., and received training from future Team 7 teammate Marc Slayton who would eventually become the hero known as Backlash, as well as former members of I.O.'s previous covert operations team, Team 6. At some point, Cole may have been a part of the Army's Special Forces.

Cole joined Team 7, being given the codename Deadeye. The group was deliberately exposed to an experimental chemical called the Gen Factor, which activated a variety of psi powers in them, but which also detrimentally affected their mental health. After the experiment the survivors were classified as Gen 12. Cole suspected that high-ranking I.O. officers were behind the experiment, while they claimed that it was an unknown chemical weapon. Cole grew more and more disgruntled with I.O.'s manipulations and secrecy and rebelled against teammates John Lynch and Slayton, particularly after Slayton killed an innocent scientist Cole had tried to rescue during a mission in Leningrad, which Slayton had done on their I.O. superiors' orders.

Most of Team 7 quit I.O. and went into hiding after they became aware that Craven was interested in using their children, the Gen^{13}, who were believed to have inherited their fathers' powers, as weapons.

Cole struck out on his own, eventually crossing paths with the ancient Kherubim warrior Zealot. They fell in love, and she took the unprecedented measure of teaching him, a man, the ways of the Coda, the warrior order she had once belonged to. Her Coda-teachings stabilized Cole's sanity and removed what remained of his psionic powers. Cole and Zealot fought their own private war against members of the Daemonite race, as well as the Coda, Cole first taking the codename Grifter.

=== Wildcats and Grifter solo series ===
Cole and Zealot's relationship eventually came to an end, though they remained partners. Both eventually joined the Daemonite-hunting team the WildC.A.T.s. Cole still loved Zealot, though he was unwilling to rekindle their relationship, since he thought doing so would only bring him pain. To stop two Daemonite lords from acquiring a spaceship which could be used to destroy or conquer Earth, the WildC.A.T.s allied themselves with Hightower, a Daemonite who had killed Grifter's friend Lonely. Grifter voiced his objections and, once WildC.A.T.s founder Jacob Marlowe threatened to kick Grifter out of the team, Cole chose instead to quit on the spot. During the scramble for control of the spaceship, Grifter killed Hightower, avenging Lonely. The ship's self-destruct sequence was activated, however, and the other WildC.A.T.s were forced to enter it and try to defuse it. They succeeded, resulting in the ship entering warpspace, taking it and the WildC.A.T.s back to Khera, while Earth's post-human population, including Grifter, believed the team dead.

While another iteration of the WildC.A.T.s was created shortly thereafter, which included Cole's brother Max, operating under the codename Condition Red, Grifter opted to operate independently, eventually becoming a mercenary soldier once again. Cole, with help from special agent Brockmeyer and I.O. officer and friend Alicia Turner, managed to get Del Gracci on tape confessing to Cole's father's murder. Grifter eventually found out from Max that his father had faked his own death, and confronted Winston in New Orleans. Winston revealed that he had stolen money from the Mafia, and had faked his own death to escape retaliation from the mob. Win tried to manipulate Grifter into protecting him from a man he had partnered on a con with and had come to the conclusion that Win was exploiting him. Grifter realized that his father was did not love him, and was a psychopath who was trying to use him. Cole then unraveled Win's latest con, and threatened to kill him if he ever came to Cole's attention again. Ultimately, letting his father escape before the police arrived.

The WildC.A.T.s eventually returned from Khera, and Grifter rejoined the team. Cole still had feelings for Zealot, and was particularly hurt when Zealot and John Colt who had previously been Spartan until Colt's memories and personality implanted in him resurfaced, briefly rekindled their relationship. Cole and Colt both insisted Zealot choose between them and, though she was initially unwilling to deal with the situation, she eventually decided she needed to choose to preserve the team's cohesion, and initially chose Colt out of a sense of loyalty as a Kherubim, eventually parting ways with him. Grifter began trying to seize the reins of the WildC.A.T.s and eventually became their leader during a period of time in which the team gained new members, including Olympia Atreidae, and Max Cash rejoined. Max was eventually murdered by a Coda assassin, and Grifter considered killing her in revenge, though Olympia who had developed feelings for Max, murdered the assassin before the situation could come to a head.

After going their separate ways for a period of time, the Wildcats were reformed, only to disband once again after Zealot's apparent death during a mission. Grifter spent some time operating once more as a mercenary, before joining a new iteration of the Wildcats, formed to take down a mysterious figure with ties to the Kherubims and Daemonites called Kenyan. By this point, the John Colt identity had receded and Spartan's original personality had returned, and, as members of the new Wildcats team, Spartan and Grifter maintained a good working relationship, though Grifter seemed to hold some antipathy towards him. Around this time, Cole attended Team 7 member Alex Fairchild's funeral with other still living members of the team, Lynch and Jackson Dane, as well as the members of Gen^{13}, which includes Fairchild's daughters Caitlin Fairchild and Roxanne Spaulding.

Grifter teamed-up with Backlash to help a group of animal-human hybrids called the Kindred. Tensions between the two remained high over what had occurred in Leningrad. Cole eventually came to the conclusion that Marc had changed, and opted to forgive him, and the two parted as friends.

Cole went on to have an encounter with Zealot, discovering she was alive, and managed to attain some closure. Spartan, now calling himself Jack Marlowe, came to an understanding with Cole, the two realizing they were like family, and would continue to work together in the future.

=== Point Blank, Wildcats 3.0 and Sleeper ===
After Team 7 field leader John Lynch was shot in the head, leaving him in a coma, Cole investigated the attack on Lynch, eventually coming to the conclusion that former WildC.A.T.S. member turned traitor Tao was involved in it. Cole discovered that Tao had created an organization made up of post-human criminals, and that Lynch had placed an undercover I.O. agent, Holden Carver in the organization, and vowed to help him leave the organization and clear his name. Tao eventually revealed that he had manipulated and brainwashed Cole into shooting Lynch, and then promptly forgetting about it. Tao then proceeded to erase this knowledge from Cole's mind once again, leaving him unaware of his role in Lynch's attack and Carver's status as an undercover agent.

During a mission for Jack Marlowe, Cole's legs were shattered by an FBI agent. Therefore, he could no longer operate as Marlowe's field agent. He trained accountant Edwin Dolby (Grifter) to take his place. Dolby turned out to be unsuitable for the violent life that Grifter planned for him and resigned from Halo. After Marlowe apologized to him, he rejoined, but strictly as an accountant. Grifter remodeled the robotic body of former teammate Ladytron as a remote-controlled body for himself.

Several months later, Grifter's legs were healed, a side effect of the dormant Gen-factor according to I.O. scientists. John Lynch, who had woken from his coma, restored Cole's memory. Cole was sent to take down Tao and working together with double-agent Holden Carver, Tao's organization was completely dismantled and Tao was imprisoned.

He later joined a makeshift team of former Wildcats to confront the assassin Nemesis.

World's End

The Wildcats reformed after a near-extinction event nearly destroyed planet Earth. Grifter eventually left the team to join The Authority, and went on to enter into a romantic relationship with Flint.

== Other versions ==
=== The Wild Storm ===
Once a decorated soldier recruited by I.O. as yet another PMC in their ranks, Cole Cash had previously entered John Lynch's Thunderbook Program, where he received Gen' Active implants and was changed into a post-human.

He later faked his own death after making contact with Lord Emp, masking his desertion as a disastrous mission gone awry. In the years that followed he came under the tutelage of Emp's fellow alien refugee, Zannah/Lucy Blaze and learned new com

=== Flashpoint ===
In the alternate timeline of the 2011 "Flashpoint" storyline, Grifter is the leader of the United Kingdom's resistance movement against the Amazons. In a flashback, Grifter assembles Team 7 to battle against terrorists in the Middle East, until they were killed. Grifter was saved by Penny Black (Britannia) and escaped from the Middle East. While Grifter was recovering, the United Kingdom is invaded by the Amazons. Grifter assembles the Resistance to fight against the Amazons. In the present, Lois Lane is rescued by the Resistance from a camp just before she is converted into an Amazon. It is revealed that the Resistance were helping to find Penny's armor prototype at Westminster, as it could turn the war around. While the Resistance are headed towards Westminster, Resistance member Miss Hyde betrays them and contacts the Female Furies. She then tries to make the Resistance surrender by threatening Lois with a knife. However, Hyde regains control of the body and fights the Amazons, allowing the Resistance to gain the upper hand. After they escape the Westminster Palace, Grifter gathers with Britannia, who has recovered her armor and found a group of released prisoners. The two then lead the Resistance in an all-out battle against the Amazons. Grifter and the Resistance arrive to attack in the Atlantean/Amazon war, and Grifter heralds their arrival by helping Batman take down Black Manta. Grifter is killed in battle by Enchantress who is in turn killed by Superman.

=== The New 52 ===
With The New 52, the 2011 relaunch of all of DC Comics' series in which Grifter is established to be a former U.S. Army Special Ops soldier who deserted and became a con-artist. During one of his latest cons, Cole Cash is assaulted and abducted by Daemonites, aliens who can "possess" human bodies. Cash is held for 17 days, while a Daemonite attempts to take possession of his body. For unknown reasons Cole wakens prematurely, aborting the transfer and leaving him with the ability to overhear the telepathic communication of Daemonites. He subsequently hijacks a plane and kills several Daemonites disguised as humans resulting in him being wanted for crimes and terrorism. Cash is now wanted by several intelligence agencies and his brother Max, also a military special operative, is tasked with apprehending him. Furthermore, the Daemonites also wish to retrieve Cash to maintain their secrecy. On the run from his many pursuers, Cash dons a costume from a costume shop to conceal his identity.

In the alternate timeline of the Future State crossover, Grifter teams up with Luke Fox, and encounters Helena Bertinelli, while trying to escape from Magistrate and the Black Mask Syndicate, to make it out of Gotham City. Being offered a payment of $75,000 in exchange for her help, Helena agrees to assist Grifter and Luke in leaving the city. Matters become more complicated, given that both Grifter and The Huntress are willing to use lethal force, while Luke lives by a moral code.

=== Infinite Frontier ===
Sometime following the "Joker War", Grifter begins to work as a bodyguard in Gotham City, being hired by Lucius Fox. Upon meeting Batman, the two fight until Fox intervenes. After having a conversation with Fox about the Joker, Punchline, and the Wayne family fortune, Batman warns Grifter that he knows who Grifter's real boss is, and that Gotham will always be under his watch.

In addition to being a bodyguard for Fox, Grifter also begins his personal pursuit of Batman, looking to end the vigilante activities of Batman. After conspiring with Deathstroke in a failed trap attempt to catch Batman, Grifter instead finds himself being chased by a misunderstood Superman, but manages to teleport away with the help of Void. It is shortly revealed that Zealot is helping Grifter with his bodyguard duties.

== Powers and abilities ==
=== Wildstorm ===
As a result of exposure to the Gen-factor, Deadeye possesses strong powers of telekinesis and telepathy. Extraneous use of his Gen-Active attributes led to a debilitating effect on his mind and body dubbed The Rush; which were terrible side effects akin to a power-trip addiction threatening to wreak havoc on his and the rest of Team 7's psyches. Chief among the flaws were loss of psionic's control which causes him to lash out in raw psychic force while reining them in at that time would cause blood vessels to rupture weakening him further still. The power began to burn out over the years and by the time of the Dead Reckoning mission, his telepathic assault was only enough to give an enemy agent a bloody nose.

Zealot taught Cole not only how to remove his powers, but also how bring them back, though he can also use them under other circumstances (usually the presence of another Team 7 member so that they can combine their powers). This training also makes it nearly impossible for individuals with psychic powers to enter Cole's mind. Additionally, John Lynch placed particularly strong psychic shields within Grifter's mind, making him immune to Tao and Peter Grimm's powers.

A side effect of his Gen-factor exposure seems to be accelerated regeneration. This healing factor also appears to have slowed his aging. He was the youngest member of Team 7, and he has the appearance and vitality of a man in his mid-to-late 20s. But its nature is rarely ever very effective, one moment healing a broken neck in seconds, to taking months for shattered legs to mend properly, albeit without any scarring. After the Worldstorm event his relatively dormant abilities have reasserted themselves in a far greater capacity, Mr. Cash being capable of more impressive psionic effects than when his powers first waxed & waned.

Grifter is also an adept psionic intuit, able to perceive things well beyond the need of sensory input. Apart from these superhuman powers, Cole is a talented marksman and expert hand-to-hand combatant.

Skilled in both firearms and thrown weapon usage on top of his already impressive unarmed melee abilities, Grifter has been known to single-handedly take down large groups of armed opponents. Having been taught the Coda killing arts by Zealot, being the only man to have been fully trained in them. Grifter received additional conventional martial arts training from Marc Slayton and former Team 6 member Jung.

While Cole's specialty is firearms he is also highly skilled with knives; having killed a Daemonite armed only with a combat knife in the past, as well as managing to stab Paris, one of the best hand-to-hand combatants in the world. Cole is also an accomplished swordsman, having been trained by Zealot. He is also a very capable demolitionist often employing shaped charges like hand grenades or thermite whilst in pitched combat with large numbers of, or more skilled enemies. Grifter is also adept at black book operations with skills pertaining to the spy network ranging from; disguise mastery, infiltration, stealth, deception, tactics, survival, vehicular operation, sabotage and the like.

=== The Wild Storm ===
Grifter is ex-military, recruited out of the U.S. special forces by International Operations for teamwork initially, eventually upgrading to solo ops work.

Grifter was tutored in combat by Lucy Blaze A.K.A. Zannah of Khera, Cole at one point participated in the Thunderbook initiative. A program in which I.O. operatives were implanted with kherubim genetic material, which caused them to generate new auxiliary organs or modify natural biophysical structure to produce newfound superhuman facilities. It also has the side effect of instilling a secondary consciousness within their minds that influence their actions and abilities from within. As a combat specialist, Grifter is an adept gun fighter with uncanny aim and body coordination. He has however been warned by Zannah that though she taught him all he knows, that's not all she knows.

Grifter is able to juggle concussion grenades back at their source with a few well placed pistol shots. Grifter is quite skilled at combining acrobatics with his gunkata, able to make backflips, jumps and side leaps while firing off his pistols with pinpoint accuracy. Grifter is also an adept tactician and navigator, able to scope out a "gag"/operation based upon accumulated information on how best to proceed.

=== New 52 ===
As part of DC Comics' 2011 reboot of its continuity, The New 52, Grifter is established to have been a trained soldier and ace marksmen long before he received his augmentations by the Daemonites. On top of his military training he was an experienced con artist who is quite skilled in theft, infiltration and misdirection in his own right. Shooting wise he's skilled enough to time his shots to block the firing chamber of an adversaries gun quite handily. After being experimented on by his Daemonite captors to be host of the collective leader, Cash had been biogenically altered to unknown degrees; he became able to hear the thought process as well as detect the presence of hosting Daemonites within his immediate vicinity. Even being able to see them as who and what they truly are as opposed to what they're pretending to be, he has even shown telepathic prowess beyond just sensing and seeing hosting alien beings able to read the thoughts of others besides just the minds of Daemonites.

He's fast enough and dexterous enough to snatch a speeding arrow out of the air and later is revealed to be telekinetic as well, using his powers to bring down an avalanche on his enemy as well as levitate and operate a host of heavy ordinance with his mind, turning his psychic powers inward he can enhance his physical abilities when/if need be. Able to deck the larger and stronger Daemonites with a mere-backhand, knock down and engage Midnighter in a fist fight whom he could barely even tickle before and much more. About 40 years in the future Cole seems to remain a man in his physical prime, meaning whatever experimentation done on him by his captors evidently extended his lifespan by decades at a time. In that expanse he's also gained a form of reality vision, his telepathy had expanded to the point where he could not only see and hear the thoughts of Daemonites or other possessing entities but could also detect beings from other realities as well.

== Collected editions ==
Title	Material collected	Publication date	ISBN
Point Blank	Point Blank #1-3	December 2003	978-1401201166
Grifter/Midnighter	Grifter/Midnighter #1-6	February 2008	978-1845767297
Grifter Vol. 1: Most Wanted	Grifter (vol. 3) #1-8	July 2012	978-1401234973
Grifter Vol. 2: New Found Power	Grifter (vol. 3) #0, 9-16	May 2013	978-1401240981

== In other media ==
- Grifter appears in Wild C.A.T.s, voiced by Colin O'Meara.
- An alternate timeline version of Grifter, based on the "Flashpoint" incarnation, appears in Justice League: The Flashpoint Paradox, voiced by Danny Jacobs.
- Grifter appears as a non-player character in Playmates Interactive's Super NES video game based on the Wild C.A.T.s TV series.
- Grifter received a regular and "giant" figure from Playmates Toys, released in 1994 and 1995 respectively.

== Reception ==
Sales for The New 52 version of Grifter struggled. Despite a strong launch that found the series debut selling 37,100 issues, sales quickly plummeted, selling 14,903 in March 2012. Issue #8, which was Edmondson's last as writer, sold 14,117 issues.

Critical reception for the series was mixed. The A.V. Club's Keith Phipps and Oliver Sava disagreed on the debut issue, with Phipps saying: "It reads like a book that could turn into something, but as a jumping-on point, this didn't really work for me," while Sava called it "a solid action thriller with a sci-fi twist." MTV Geek largely panned the opening issue, giving it a score of 10/52 and saying "Grifter feels like a series of sort of clever action beats that never got put together as a proper story".
