= Brandon Choi =

American comic book writer

- Born: Seoul, South Korea
- Area: Writer
- Notable works: WildC.A.T.s; Gen^{13}

Brandon Choi is an American comic book writer best known for his work for WildStorm Productions, in particular for the series WildC.A.T.s and Gen^{13}.

== Biography ==
Choi was born in Seoul, South Korea and came to the U.S. when he was two years old. He formed a boyhood friendship with future comic book collaborator Jim Lee, and began creating comics together when they were both in the sixth grade. Choi and Lee's 1986 comic Wild Boys landed Lee his first job at Marvel Comics.

Choi studied entertainment law after high school, but changed careers after graduation. While making plans to attend graduate school to study screenwriting, Lee contacted Choi with an offer to work at Homage Studios, which later became Wildstorm Productions.

In 1992, Choi and Lee co-created the series WildC.A.T.s with Lee, which would be their debut book from Image Comics, the company Lee and several other popular artists formed to publish creator-owned comics. In 1998 these properties were purchased by DC Comics, and incorporated into that publisher's continuity.

Choi is an uncle-in-law to Shammas Malik, the mayor of Akron, Ohio.

== Bibliography ==
=== Image ===
- Darker Image #1 (1993)
- Deathblow #0–15, 17–29 (1993–96)
- Gen12 #1–5 (1998)
- Gen^{13} vol. 1 #1–5 (1994)
- Gen^{13} vol. 2 #0–29 (1995–98)
- The Kindred #1–4 (1994)
- Savage Dragon #13 (1994)
- Stormwatch #0–8 (1993–94)
- Wetworks vol. 1 #1–3 (1994)
- WildC.A.T.s vol. 1 #0–9, #37–50 (1992–94, 1997–98)

=== Image/Valiant ===
- Deathmate Black (1993)

=== Marvel ===
- Fantastic Four vol. 2 #1–12 (1996–97)

== Sources ==
- Brandon Choi at the Grand Comics Database
- Brandon Choi at the Comic Book DB (archived from the original)

| Preceded by Tom DeFalco | Fantastic Four writer (with Jim Lee); 1996–1997 | Succeeded by Scott Lobdell |
