= List of Stormwatch members =

This is a list of members of the superhero team Stormwatch.

== Stormwatch Prime ==
| Character | Real name | Notes |
|---|---|---|
Stormwatch Prime Team under Weatherman Henry Bendix prior to issue 1.
| Backlash | Marc Slayton | Team leader and instructor. |
| Battalion | Jackson King | |
| Flashpoint | Foster McClane | Missing in action during Stormwatch #0, presumed dead between Stormwatch #1 and Stormwatch #6. |
| Nautika | Maya Royko | Missing in action during Stormwatch #0, presumed dead between Stormwatch #1 and Stormwatch #6. |
| Sunburst | Karl Hansen | Missing in action during Stormwatch #0, presumed dead between Stormwatch #1 and Stormwatch #6. |

== Issues #1–10 ==
After the losing most of the team, Stormwatch is restructured and new recruits are added prior to issue #1. Backlash is promoted to head of training.

| Character | Real name | Notes |
|---|---|---|
Stormwatch One Team under Weatherman Henry Bendix from issue #1 to 10, co-existent with Stormwatch Two.
| Battalion | Jackson King | Team leader. |
| Diva | Alessandra Fermi | |
| Fuji | Toshiro Misawa | |
| Hellstrike | Nigel Keane | |
| Winter | Nikolas Andreyvitch Kamarov | |
Stormwatch Two Team under Weatherman Henry Bendix from issue #1 to 10, co-existent with Stormwatch One.
| Cannon | Mitchell Saunders | |
| Fahrenheit | Lauren Pennington | |
| Ion | | Killed in action in Stormwatch #2. |
| Lancer | | Killed in action in Stormwatch #2. |
| Strafe | Malcolm King | |

== Issues #11–26 ==
Henry Bendix is stripped of his position in issue #11 and replaced by his second-in-command Synergy, also known as Christine Trelane. Team assignments are variable from this point on, grouping operatives and assigning command as situations dictate.

| Character | Real name | Notes |
|---|---|---|
Stormwatch Team under Weatherman Christine Trelane from issue #11 to 26, co-existent with Stormwatch Prime.
| Battalion | Jackson King | Team leader, missing in action during Stormwatch #16–25. |
| Diva | Alessandra Fermi | Team leader after Battalion's disappearance, killed in action in Stormwatch #23. |
| Fahrenheit | Lauren Pennington | |
| Fuji | Toshiro Misawa | |
| Hellstrike | Nigel Keane | Missing in action from Stormwatch #25. |
| Pagan | Zarej | also known as Fiend |
| Strafe | Malcolm King | Incarcerated following Stormwatch #27. |
| Undertow | Ray Bailey | Comatose from Stormwatch #25 onward. |
| Winter | Nikolas Andreyvitch Kamarov | |
| Spartan | Hadrian | Former member of WildC.A.T.s; added to team after the disappearance of the WildC.A.T.s in Wildstorm Rising (prior to Stormwatch #23), promoted to team leader after Diva's death, killed in action in Stormwatch #27. |
Stormwatch Prime Team under Weatherman Christine Trelane from issue #11 to 26, co-existent with Stormwatch.
| Flashpoint | Foster McClane | Incarcerated from Stormwatch Special #2 (occurring prior to Stormwatch #22) through Stormwatch #30. |
| Nautika | Maya Royko | Resigned after Stormwatch #22. |
| Sunburst | Karl Hansen | Comatose after Stormwatch #22. |

== Issue #27 till Fire from Heaven ==
The team is rebuilt after the defeat of Despot (issue #27) and Henry Bendix is again Weatherman, with Synergy as his second.

| Character | Real name | Notes |
|---|---|---|
"The New" Stormwatch Team under Weatherman Henry Bendix prior to Fire from Heaven; directly commanded by Synergy from Stormwatch #28–30.
| Blademaster | | Killed in action by the terrorist Deathtrap. |
| Comanche | | |
| Flint | Victoria Ngengi | |
| Prism | | |
| Swift | Shen Li-Min | |
| Blitz | | Killed in action during Stormwatch #30. |
| Damascus | | Killed in action during Stormwatch #30. |
| Pagan | Zarej | |
Stormwatch Team under Weatherman Henry Bendix prior to Fire From Heaven; returned to duty in Stormwatch #31.
| Battalion | Jackson King | Team leader. |
| Cannon | Mitchell Saunders | |
| Fahrenheit | Lauren Pennington | |
| Flashpoint | Foster McClane | Killed in action during Stormwatch #36. |
| Fuji | Toshiro Misawa | |
| Hellstrike | Nigel Keane | |
| Winter | Nikolas Andreyvitch Kamarov | |
Stormforce Team under Weatherman Henry Bendix prior to Fire From Heaven; non-superpowered military team under Weatherman's control.
| | Captain Ken Tucker | |
| | Nur Ansari | |
| | Marcel Bertrand | |
| | Harv Bowden | |
| | Rachel Daniels | |
| | Molly Perkins | |
| | Wilson Yee | |

== After Fire from Heaven ==
After the Fire from Heaven crossover, a major restructuring of Stormwatch occurred in Warren Ellis' first issue. Battalion became head of training, and Synergy to head of recruitment. Molly Perkins moved to the Analysis Deck of Skywatch. Sunburst and Nautica left Stormwatch service and worked as Earth-based analysts for Skywatch. Blademaster, Cannon, Comanche, Pagan, Prism and Undertow were dismissed, with lifetime U.N.-provided salary and accommodations. Undertow is killed soon after.

| Character | Real name | Notes |
|---|---|---|
Stormwatch Prime Team under Weatherman Henry Bendix following Fire From Heaven.
| Winter | Nikolas Andreyvitch Kamarov | Team leader, as well as leader of aggregate Stormwatch group during multi-team field operations. |
| Hellstrike | Nigel Keane | |
| Fuji | Toshiro Misawa | |
Stormwatch Red Team under Weatherman Henry Bendix following Fire From Heaven.
| Fahrenheit | Lauren Pennington | Team leader. |
| Flint | Victoria Ngengi | |
| Rose Tattoo | unknown | Killed in action during Stormwatch #50. |
Stormwatch Black Team under Weatherman Henry Bendix following Fire From Heaven.
| Jenny Sparks | Jennifer Sparks | Team leader. |
| Jack Hawksmoor | Jack Hawksmoor | |
| Swift | Shen Li-Min | |
"Secret" Stormwatch team revealed in volume two Team under Weatherman Henry Bendix following Fire From Heaven.
| Apollo | | Equivalent to DC's Superman. One of two survivors from the team's first mission. |
| Midnighter | Lucas Trent | Equivalent to DC's Batman. One of two survivors from the team's first mission. His real name was revealed in Midnighter #10. |
| Impetus | | Equivalent to DC's Flash. Did not survive the first mission. Reappeared as a zombie during the Devil's Night crossover; cut in half by Swift. |
| Amaze | | Equivalent to DC's Wonder Woman. Shot dead during the first mission. Reappeared as a zombie during the Devil's Night crossover; killed again by Midnighter. |
| Lamplight | | Equivalent to DC's Green Lantern. Did not survive the first mission. Reappeared as a zombie during the Devil's Night crossover; killed again by Midnighter. |
| Stalker | | Equivalent to DC's Martian Manhunter. Did not survive the first mission. |
| Crow Jane | | Equivalent to DC's Black Canary. Did not survive the first mission. |

== After Change or Die ==
After the Change or Die storyline, Henry Bendix was missing and presumed dead. Jackson King became Weatherman and Molly Perkins became head of analysis. The Stormwatch field teams were restructured. Stormwatch Black was officially dissolved but retained in secret.

| Character | Real name | Notes |
|---|---|---|
Stormwatch Team under Weatherman Jackson King.
| Winter | Nikolas Andreyvitch Kamarov | Killed in WildC.A.T.s/Aliens #1. Became one with the sun and was caged by the Authority in The Authority: Scorched Earth. |
| Fahrenheit | Lauren Pennington | Killed in WildC.A.T.s/Aliens #1. |
| Fuji | Toshiro Misawa | Killed in WildC.A.T.s/Aliens #1. |
| Hellstrike | Nigel Keane | Killed in WildC.A.T.s/Aliens #1. |
| Flint | Victoria Ngengi | The only survivor. |
Stormwatch Black Team under Weatherman Jackson King.
| Jenny Sparks | Jennifer Sparks | Team leader. |
| Jack Hawksmoor | Jack Hawksmoor | |
| Swift | Shen Li-Min | |

After Skywatch is destroyed in WildC.A.T.s/Aliens #1, Stormwatch was dissolved. Stormwatch Black became the Authority at the end of the series, with the addition of former "secret" Stormwatch members Midnighter and Apollo as well as the second Doctor and the second Engineer.

== Alternate universe Stormwatch ==
In the Bleed storyline, Stormwatch observed events unfold on a parallel Earth that had never been visited by the Daemonites or Kherubim. In this universe, Battalion had been removed from Stormwatch after a catastrophic attack on the Skywatch space station and was replaced as Weatherman by Jack Hawksmoor, with Synergy retaining her position as second-in-command. Jack's bodyguard and personal assistant was Freefall of Gen^{13}, going by her real name Roxanne Spaulding. His maid in the United States was Anna, Gen^{13}s domestic android. He commanded a version of Stormwatch employing twenty-three super-powered beings with twenty field operatives divided into five teams.

| Character | Real name | Notes |
|---|---|---|
Stormwatch Team Two Team under Jack Hawksmoor and Synergy.
| Fairchild | Caitlin Fairchild | Team leader. |
| Deathblow | Michael Cray | |
| Hellstrike | Nigel Keane | |
| Rainmaker | Sarah Rainmaker | |
Stormwatch Team Four Team under Jack Hawksmoor and Synergy.
| Cole Cash | | Team leader. He does not wear a mask or use the codenames Deadeye or Grifter. |
| The Doctor | | |
| Fahrenheit | Lauren Pennington | |
| Sublime | Rachel Goldman | |
Other team members (teams unknown):
| Backlash | Marc Slayton | Team leader. |
| Jenny Sparks | Jennifer Sparks | Team leader. |
| Winter | Nikolas Andreyvitch Kamarov | Team leader. |
| Apollo | | |
| Copycat | Gem Antonelli | |
| Jackson Dane | | |
| Flint | Victoria Ngengi | |
| Frostbite | Leon Carver | |
| Fuji | Toshiro Misawa | |
| Grunge | Percival Chang | |
| Midnighter | Lucas Trent | |
| Swift | Shen Li-Min | |

== The New 52 DC relaunch (issues #1–18, issue #30) ==
| Character | Real Name | Notes |
|---|---|---|
Stormwatch
| Jack Hawksmoor | Jack Hawksmoor | |
| Martian Manhunter | J'onn J'onzz | Resigned in Stormwatch (vol. 3) #12 after wiping everyone's memories of his existence on the team later rejoin the Justice League. |
| Jenny Quantum | Jennifer Emily Quantum | |
| The Engineer | Angela Spica | Leader |
| Adam One | Merlin | Abducted by the Shadow Cabinet in Stormwatch (vol. 3) #5. |
| The Projectionist | Emma Rice | Captured by Harry Tanner in Stormwatch (vol. 3) #5; rejoined in #15. |
| The Eminence of Blades | Harry Tanner | Defected in Stormwatch (vol. 3) #5. |
| Apollo | Andrew | Joined in Stormwatch (vol. 3) #6. |
| Midnighter | Unknown | Joined in Stormwatch (vol. 3) #6. |

== Magenta timeline (issues #19–29) ==
A new Stormwatch team was assembled by the Shadow Lords after learning the Kollective had created an alternate timeline by murdering Adam One, thereby erasing the previous Stormwatch from existence. Following the defeat of the Kollective, the Magenta Timeline was obliterated with reality reverting to its original continuum and restoring the previous incarnation of Stormwatch in issue #30.

| Character | Real Name | Notes |
|---|---|---|
Stormwatch
| Weird | Walter Langley | |
| Hellstrike | Nigel Smut | |
| Jenny Soul | Jennifer Soul | Magenta Timeline equivalent of Jenny Quantum |
| The Engineer | Angela Spica | |
| Lobo | | Captured and recruited into service by Storm Control in Stormwatch (vol. 4) #22 |
| Apollo | Andrew Pulaski | |
| Midnighter | Lucas Trent | |
| Storm Control | Unknown | Team leader and commander of Skywatch headquarters. Modified clone of the Martian Manhunter. |
| Force | Unknown | New recruit and trainee, bearing a close resemblance to Fuji. |
| X | Xiomar | South African metahuman recruited to assist with logistical duties (vol. 4) #23. |
| The Forecaster | | Volgarian being assigned intel, control and operations of Skywatch HQ |

== Other characters appearing in Stormwatch ==
- Deathtrap
- Union
- Changers
- Pavlo Stupka / Core
