= List of The Authority story arcs =

This article is a list of story arcs for the Wildstorm comic book The Authority presented in chronological order of release.

== The Authority, vol. 1 ==
=== "The Circle" (#1–4) ===
The Authority make their first public appearance to stop Kaizen Gamorra, an old enemy of Stormwatch, who wants to take advantage of Stormwatch's breakup to take revenge upon the world. To do this he uses engineered supersoldiers to destroy first Moscow and then part of London. The Authority does not manage to stop the attack on London, then predicts the third and final attack in Los Angeles which is averted with heavy civilian casualties. Midnighter uses the Carrier to destroy the superhuman clone factory on Gamorra's island.

=== "Shiftships" (#5–8) ===
The Authority have to stop an invasion by a parallel Earth, specifically a parallel Britain called Sliding Albion. As it turns out, Jenny Sparks has met them before when their shiftships first appeared in 1920. Sliding Albion is a world where open contact between aliens (the blues) and humans during the 16th century led to interbreeding and an imperialist culture similar to the Victorian British Empire. After the Authority repel the initial wave of attacks, Jenny takes the Carrier to the Sliding Albion universe where they destroy London and Italy and what's left of the blues' regime along with it. In an all-frequencies message, she tells the people to take advantage of the second chance and "We are the Authority. Behave."

It is during this arc that Apollo and Midnighter's relationship is revealed, though it had been hinted at before.

=== "The Outer Dark" (#9–12) ===
During the closing days of 1999, strange alien creatures begin building unknown structures in Africa and on the Moon. This prompts the previous Doctors to reveal to the current Doctor a vital secret: the original creator of Earth, the closest thing to the concept of "God" that exists, has returned from a grand tour of the universe to find humanity as an unwanted infestation in its "retirement home". Thus "God" is terraforming Earth to be habitable for itself (and uninhabitable for humans) in time for the arrival of its person, which is an immense pyramid-shaped object the size of the Moon.

The Engineer convinces the Carrier to leave Earth orbit. The Authority pilot the Carrier into the approaching "God" through a pore and manage to navigate to its brain. On the route they encounter the being's immune system as well as a civilization that has evolved from parasites over billions of years. During the closing minutes of December 31, 1999, Jenny Sparks carries out her final act as the Spirit of the Twentieth Century, electrocuting the creature's brain to death before dying in Jack Hawksmoor's arms.

=== "The Nativity" (#13–16) ===
Now under Jack Hawksmoor's leadership, the Authority try but fail to capture Jenny Quantum, the newborn Spirit of the Twenty-First Century, already proven to be more powerful than Sparks ever was. Instead, she is taken by a superhero-creating mastermind, Dr. Jacob Krigstein, who wants Jenny so he can shape the next century through her. Swift cuts a deal for custody of Jenny with Krigstein, who is granted lab space aboard the Carrier, and the chance to exercise his imagination reforming the dictatorships the Authority overthrows.

=== "Earth Inferno" (#17–20) ===
The Authority face the Earth itself, which is about to catastrophically reverse its magnetic poles, spurred on to do so by a former Doctor who was stripped of his powers when he went renegade. In exchange for one hour's worth of full power from the current Doctor, the renegade agrees to save humanity. With no other options, the Authority evacuate the entire population of Earth to alternate Earths, then agree to the exchange. The renegade takes on and almost completely destroys the Authority with his new power before the full scope of his powers and experience catches up to him, and he is overwhelmed with empathy for all the living creatures left on Earth. Apollo and the Engineer kill him and the Earth's population returns home, some thrilled by their adventures.

=== "All Tomorrow's Parties" (#21) ===
Jackson King and Christine Trelane attend a party on the Carrier. This issue acts as a prologue to the Monarchy miniseries.

=== "Brave New World" (#22, 27–29) ===
Tired with the Authority's interference with the activities of their governments, the G7 nations decide to replace them with a group more subject to their interests. They send their secret weapon, an American hillbilly named Seth whom they turned into a monstrous superhuman stated to have over a thousand super powers, to attack the Authority. Seth neutralizes all of the Authority except for Midnighter, who manages to escape with baby Jenny.

=== "Transfer of Power" (#23–26) ===
The ideals of the original Authority give way to the unprincipled new team, who work directly for the G7 nations, do not question orders, and have all they can wish for. The new team possess the same powers and/or distinctive appearances as the original team, and most take variations of their names. The electrically powered, Union Flag-clad Colonel (Britain) is patterned after Jenny Sparks, Swift is replaced with Rush (Canada), the Doctor is replaced with the Surgeon (France), Engineer is replaced with the Machine (Japan), Apollo is replaced with Teuton (Germany), Midnighter is replaced with Last Call (Italy), and Hawksmoor is replaced with Street (USA).

On their first ride in the Carrier, the new team discover thousands of refugees whom the previous Authority had been sheltering on board the ship, some of them still alive. They dump them out into a realm called Re-Space, only to discover to their cost that Re-Space allows people to re-imagine their world—the refugees take the G7 leaders' wealth as their own, attack the Carrier and reimagine the Authority, transforming the newcomers into the original team. But Last Call's homophobia surges up when the re-imagined Apollo touches him; they break free and return the Earth to the way it was before.

"Brave New World" continues with the previous members of the Authority having been mind-wiped and forced into humiliating new lives. Midnighter, the only one to have escaped, infiltrates the Carrier. He frees his imprisoned boyfriend Apollo and between them they kill the rest of the new Authority, leaving only Seth to deal with. At a G7 reunion, Swift finds herself freed from her mind control due to the death of Machine just in time to find out about Seth's "off-button" code phrase. The original Authority regroup but Seth again takes them all down, leaving only baby Jenny—who speaks aloud the code phrase and turns Seth back into an easily defeated human.

The story, and the first volume of The Authority, close with Apollo and Midnighter marrying, and adopting baby Jenny.

Contrary to popular opinion, this is the first recorded instance of two gay superheroes getting married. It is frequently misattributed to the superhero Northstar, whose marriage is depicted 10 years after Apollo and Midnighter's union.

== The Authority, vol. 2 ==
=== "High Stakes" (#0) ===
The Authority battle an invasion from Viceworld, a world-sized casino and pleasure complex catering to people across the multiverse, whose owner started the invasion so people could bet on whether or not the Authority would be able to stop it.

=== "Reality Incorporated" (#1–4) ===
The Authority battle an attack by inter-dimensional suicide bombers in Chicago. After all of but one of the bombers is destroyed, the last has a change of heart and surrenders. The US Army tries (and fails) to arrest the Authority afterwards, because the US government now considers it a hostile power.

On the Carrier the bomber reveals that the responsible party is Reality Incorporated, a multiversal corporation with what amount to multibillion-dollar interests in 36 parallel universes, which terraforms inhabited planets into vast resources of fossil fuel to sell across the multiverse. A meeting with Wade Walker, representative of Reality Inc., confirms that they wipe out or enslave civilizations during this process, and they intend to do the same to the Authority's Earth. After a hard battle, the Authority is able to destroy Reality Inc.'s all-out fleet attack just as it enters Earth space, thanks to the sacrifice of the surviving suicide bomber.

=== "Behemoth" (#5) ===
The Engineer tells young Jenny Quantum a sanitized version of how they confronted a giant monster who was attacking Kuala Lumpur. The monster was a nine-year-old boy whose latent powers were activated by a confrontation with his abusive father. The Doctor, in an action he's not proud of, was forced to assume the form of the boy's father to threaten him into submission, leaving the boy in a vegetative state.

=== "Godhead" (#6–9) ===
John Clay, a former actor and active metahuman, has begun infecting members of the public with a highly contagious psychic virus which causes utter devotion to himself, and channels a portion of the infected's energies into him, turning him into a physical metahuman of the highest order. Members of the Authority struggle in vain to avoid "the transcendence," with only Apollo, Swift and the Engineer left active. However, Midnighter actively fights the change, and the Doctor, although infected, uses his link to the former Doctors and the Garden of Ancestral Memory to free himself, allowing him to psychically hijack Clay's psionic control network and invert it. Enormous, the Doctor plucks the beaten Clay up, and swallows him.

At the end of this arc the Doctor creates the Church of the Shaman, seeking to provide a religious alternative for many of those who had felt disillusioned by conventional religions in the wake of Clay's cult.

== Coup d'État (4-issue miniseries) ==
"Coup d'État" was the Wildstorm crossover event that placed the Authority as the sole governing body of the United States and explored the reactions of the protagonists of other Wildstorm comics: WildCats, Stormwatch: Team Achilles, and Sleeper.

The United States government obtains an engine that can go through the Bleed, giving them the opportunity to explore, and exploit, other worlds. Although they have been warned by the Authority, the government launches the engine without knowing what will happen next. That ignorance results in the engine creating a rip in the Bleed and the partial destruction of a shiftship parked on the "other side" at the time, which then falls on and completely destroys the state of Florida, leading to millions of deaths and bringing Earth to the brink of inter-dimensional war with the rest of the ship's passengers' species. After discovering the responsible party, the Authority stages a bloodless coup and successfully takes control of the United States.

== The Authority, vol. 2 (continued) ==
=== "Fractured World" (The Authority #10–13) ===
Reality appears to be tearing apart at the seams as dozens of holes open up into the Bleed, bringing either natural disaster or villainous parallel-world metahumans through into the Wildstorm Universe. The Authority are confounded and all but ineffective. At the same time, they face a legal claim to right of child custody from a woman claiming to be the mother of Jenny Quantum. Since the DNA test by the Engineer produces a confirmed match, the woman is allowed on board the Carrier to see her daughter. It is revealed that the woman is in fact Jenny Quantum's twin sister, Jenny Fractal, raised by Chinese authorities into a killing machine, hating all life and Quantum in particular, and that she is the one responsible for the Bleed fractures.

In the ensuing fight, Quantum is killed. The only solution that can be found is for Midnighter to go back in time to the maternity ward where the Jenny twins were held - knowing instinctively which one is his daughter, he kills Fractal in her sleep. In the present, Fractal's body drops dead, allowing Quantum's spirit to inhabit it, taking her twin's body as her own.

=== "Street Life" (#14) ===
A short story that covers Jack Hawksmoor's past and his personal vendetta for the killing of an old love.

== "The Eternal Return" (The Authority: Revolution #1–12) ==
The Authority are plagued by a group of old superhumans called the Sons of Liberty, consisting of old patriotic superheroes from the 1940s, 50s, and 60s. They rally American citizens discontented with the Authority's take-over of the US government, and lead a series of riots across the nation, answering to a mysterious man in a hood who operates his own Carrier and has an entire alien race under his control.

While the team struggle to control this threat, the Midnighter receives an unsettling visit from an aged Apollo, who claims to have travelled from the future. He shows Midnighter a future in which Authority rule has reduced the world to a totalitarian dictatorship, and in which Midnighter himself has become a brain-damaged despot. Apollo tells Midnighter this future can be avoided only if he breaks up the Authority.

Soon the leader of the Sons of Liberty, a hero codenamed Paul Revere, challenges the Authority to face him and his comrades on the White House lawn. In the ensuing battle one of the combatants, a nuclear-powered member of the Sons of Liberty, becomes unstable. The resultant explosion destroys the White House, and much of Washington, D.C. Ashamed by their failure, the Authority resign as rulers of the United States, and disband. The Doctor dismantles his Church of the Shaman. At the end of the fifth chapter, the mysterious man in the hood is revealed to be ex-Weatherman Henry Bendix himself, who then takes over the United States in the Authority's absence.

Three years pass and much has changed in the Wildstorm Universe. Jack Hawksmoor and the Engineer have taken the Carrier for themselves and travel through the multiverse for pleasure. The Midnighter battles crime all over the world, leaving Apollo to look after their adopted daughter, Jenny Quantum. Swift has retired to a Buddhist monastery in Tibet. Tragically, the Doctor has apparently died from a drug overdose.

While visiting the Doctor's grave, Jenny Quantum, now eight years old, decides to travel to the Garden of Ancestral Memory where all the previous Doctors went when they died. She learns that Jeroen is not there and never has been.

Back at her home, Jenny is visited by a future version of herself who brings her to the Infinite City - a dimension housing past Jennies, comparable to the Garden of Ancestral Memory. There Jenny Sparks, realising that Bendix has been manipulating the team, advises her to reunite the Authority to fight him. Jenny Quantum then returns home, causing herself to advance to age 14 - realising she needs to grow up to handle the looming threat. She sets about reuniting the Authority, who agree under her leadership to go after Bendix.

Meanwhile, Henry Bendix reveals how he overthrew the Authority to the newly reincarnated Rose Tattoo, the Spirit of Murder. Bendix used Rose to seduce and murder the Doctor and capture his soul, which Bendix used as a compass to locate the new Doctor: a teenaged Palestinian suicide bomber named Habib Ben Hassan. Bendix then captured Habib and imprisoned him in a cell on his Carrier where the boy was cut off from his powers. Soon after this revelation Jenny succeeds in freeing both Doctors, returning them to Earth.

Bendix then reveals himself to the Authority, appearing on their Carrier with Rose Tattoo and a legion of his alien followers. They fight and Bendix uses mind-control to turn the Midnighter against his allies. But Jenny Quantum and the Engineer are able to free the Midnighter from Bendix's control, and then bring the fight back to him. With the element of surprise on their side they are able to win and free the world from Bendix's fascist control.

Habib is able to turn Rose Tattoo to the side of the angels, making her the Spirit of Life instead of the Spirit of Murder, and Jenny Quantum decides to let her join the team. The volume ends at a party Jenny has arranged between the past Jennies and Doctors.

== "Worldstorm" (Captain Atom: Armageddon #1–9) ==
DCU superhero Captain Atom finds himself stranded in the Wildstorm Universe. Majestic of the Wildcats discovers that the dimension-leap has fundamentally destabilised Atom, and concludes that his continued presence in the Wildstorm Universe will cause its imminent entropic destruction. The Authority offer to help Captain Atom find the way home, cruising the Bleed in search of the DC Universe, and at first he strikes up a romantic relationship with the Engineer. However, Atom becomes horrified by the Wildstorm superheroes' casual attitudes toward violence and the lives of ordinary people. At the same time, Jack Hawksmoor discovers that Captain Atom can neither be sent home nor defused - to save the Wildstorm Universe, he must be killed.

In the ensuing battle, the Engineer is depowered, and Apollo kills Grifter (of the Wildcats) who is fighting on Captain Atom's side. In retaliation Captain Atom kills Apollo, Midnighter, and Jenny Quantum, and the surviving members of the Authority discover too late that even Captain Atom's death would not save the Wildstorm Universe. It transpires that Wildcats superhero Void, now occupying the body of young EMT worker Nikola Hanssen, has located the missing half of her fractured essence in Captain Atom's body, and she reclaims it to fulfill her own power. It is she who ultimately destroys and reboots the universe, vowing "I remember what it feels like to be weak and afraid -- it's not going to be like that anymore."

== The Authority, vol. 3 and The Authority: The Lost Year #1-12) ==
=== "Utopian" (#1–4) ===
The Authority's Carrier crashes into a parallel Earth in a low energy universe, stranded after the disappearance of the 'baby universe' which powers their spacecraft. After exploring a comic book shop in Manhattan called the Forbidden Planet, the Doctor realises that the Authority is a simple story in this universe which entirely lacks any superhumans or the means to support them. Meanwhile, the Engineer, after probing the planet's entire internet, discovers that while this planet is extraordinarily rich in pornography there are no technological resources available to help them save the dying Carrier; the Engineer also theorises that this low energy parallel universe may actually be the 'baby universe' itself.

The Doctor mind probes a man called Ken, who they encountered in a submarine near the ocean floor where they crashed, and discovers that there is a slumbering Lovecraftian creature feeding off of the collective subconscious of the planet's population which he has now woken. As a result of the creature's stirring, the world begins to experience a nervous breakdown causing an epidemic of extreme violence and suicides.

The Engineer soon forms a plan and suggests that they may be able to jump start the Carrier by killing the parasite and using its life force as fuel. In order to tap into the parasite, however, a conduit is required which in this case would be Ken. Ken, despite his disturbance at the superheroes' authoritarian philosophies, agrees to help in what he has been led to believe is saving the world. As the Carrier is jump started and enters into the Bleed, Ken is killed by the strain of serving as the conduit while the parasite "mainlines its death throes into every person on the planet", killing every human on the parallel Earth.

== "World's End" (The Authority, vol. 4 #1 – current) ==
Following Number of the Beast, The Authority get involved in the World's End trying to figure out if there is enough left of the world to try and make better. The Authority is now a shattered team, living in a badly damaged London, called now Unlondon. After the Number of the Beast events left Earth a shadowy wasteland, the Authority vows to protect what's left of the city, facing their own shortcomings. Swift now uses her powers to be a messenger and a transmitter, due to EMP disabling every communication system, and additionally care for birds, unhinged and unable to function in the hostile ecosystem. Apollo and Midnighter are now separated, as Midnighter stays on earth, fighting mutates and helping people, and Apollo is forced to live high in the photosphere, where enough sunlight radiations are able to pierce the smog covering the planet. A badly crippled Jack, and a completely powerless Angela Spica reside now in the dead husk that once was the Carrier, now a corpse dimensionally fused to London ruins, used as a safehouse for survivors.
