= Jenny Sparks: The Secret History of the Authority =

- Cover of the first issue

Publication information
- Publisher: Wildstorm
- Schedule: Monthly
- Format: Limited series
- Genre: Superhero
- Publication date: August 2000 – March 2001
- No. of issues: 5
- Main character: Jenny Sparks

Creative team
- Written by: Mark Millar
- Penciller: John McCrea
- Inker: James Hodgkins
- Letterer: Bill O'Neill
- Colorist: Ian Hannin
- Editor: John Layman

Collected editions
- Jenny Sparks: The Secret History of the Authority: ISBN 1-56389-769-5

Jenny Sparks: The Secret History of the Authority is a five-issue comic book limited series published in 2000 by DC Comics under the Wildstorm imprint, written by Mark Millar with pencils by John McCrea.

== Plot synopsis ==
The five-part series deals with the initial meetings between Jenny Sparks and her future teammates, the six other members of the original Authority: Apollo and Midnighter, Jack Hawksmoor, the Engineer, the Doctor, and Swift. They are the main focus of each separate mission undertaken by Jenny Sparks during the span of the twentieth century. She encounters notable historical and fictional characters such as Albert Einstein, Adolf Hitler when he was an unemployed artist and again when he had become Führer of Germany, Ernest Hemingway and Rumpole.

== Collected editions ==
The series has been collected into a trade paperback:

- Jenny Sparks: The Secret History of the Authority (128 pages, May 2001, ISBN 1-56389-769-5)
