= Team 7 =

Comic book superhero team

- Team 7 #1 (art by Whilce Portacio)

Publication information
- Publisher: WildStorm (DC Comics)
- First appearance: Team 7 #1 (October 1994)
- Created by: Chuck Dixon and Aron Wiesenfeld

In-story information
- Member(s): Michael Cray; John Lynch; Cole Cash; Marc Slayton; Jackson Dane; Christie Blaze

Team 7 is a comic book superhero team that appeared in titles published by Wildstorm Productions. The team has appeared in three self-titled miniseries: Team 7, Team 7: Objective Hell and Team 7: Dead Reckoning. The first 5-issue Gen^{13} limited series also involved members of Team 7. The team's members have played a major role throughout the Wildstorm Universe. In September 2011, The New 52 rebooted DC's continuity, bringing in Wildstorm characters, including Team 7.

== Publication history ==
Team 7 debuted in a self-titled four-issue limited series, published in 1994–95. Writer Brandon Choi remarked on this mini-series that "I really enjoyed [writer] Chuck Dixon's portrayal of the team members, especially Cole. He really wove Cole's background into the whole Team 7 story in a very believable fashion."

The team was featured in the series Wetworks.

A new ongoing series about the group was announced by DC in June 2012. It began with a "#0" issue in November 2012, and ended with a "#8" issue in July 2013. The series was written by Justin Jordan and illustrated by an assortment of artists. Set five years in the past during the emergence of superheroes, the group's membership consists of a combination of DCU and Wildstorm characters: Dinah Drake, Amanda Waller, Kurt Lance, Summer Ramos, James Bronson, Dean Higgins, John Lynch, Alex Fairchild, Cole Cash, and Slade Wilson.

== Fictional biography ==
Team 7 was officially the seventh incarnation of a group of military specialists gathered from various government forces (a Team Zero was later revealed, making Team 7 the group's eighth incarnation).

Team 7 took its orders from Miles Craven, director of International Operations. Craven wanted his own army of superhumans, and therefore dropped a chemical known as the "Gen-Factor" on the members of Team 7 during a (suicide) mission. When they awoke from their Gen-Factor induced comas, Team 7 was told that the enemy had dropped a chemical weapon on them. As a result of the Gen-Factor, Team 7 (except for Michael Cray) started to develop superhuman powers. It would be years before Cray himself would develop similar abilities. Team 7 member Cole Cash distrusted Craven and suspected that he was behind the experiment. Several members of Team 7 were unable to cope with their new powers and went mad or committed suicide. At least one had to be shot during a subsequent mission. As a test, Craven dropped a "low-yield nuke" on Team 7. The members survived through co-operation and went into hiding.

Sometime later, Team 7 returned to work for I.O. and were sent to destroy a cache of nuclear weapons from Cambodia before the Khmer Rouge could get them. The team succeeded, but learned that a pair of Soviet superhumans were trailing them. They battled them, but they turned out to be too strong and Jackson Dane went into a coma. The Cambodian blind girl X'ing X'iang, who had displayed superhuman mental powers before, overpowered one of the Soviet agents, while Michael Cray shot the other one. The team returned to the U.S. and took X'ing X'iang with them.

Years later, the Team 7 members were ordered to bring in the Soviet scientist, Dbovchek. Cole Cash entered the Soviet Union on his own to find out more about Dbovchek while the rest of the team went on the mission. Dbovchek turned out to be one of the main scientists behind the Russian psionic program. The mission turned out to be a failure; Dbovchek was killed and Cash was captured. Cash discovers that his mental powers were waning, but John Lynch saved him.

Back in the U.S., Jackson Dane awoke from his coma under the influence of International Operations. Dane's powers turned out to be far stronger than the rest of Team 7 combined, but Cray brought in X'ing X'iang who freed Dane. She found out through Dane that Miles Craven had become interested in the children of Team 7, so most Team 7 members took their families and went into hiding. This would turn out to be the end of Team 7, though most members would stay in contact and occasionally reunite.

Jackson Dane would lead a new Team 7 years later.

=== DC Universe ===
After the events of the Flashpoint limited series, the Wildstorm Universe was assimilated into the DC Universe as seen in 2011's launch of The New 52. In this timeline, Team 7 was assembled by John Lynch, to prevent future metahuman threats. Members like Black Canary, Deathstroke, and Grifter gained their superpowers while working in the team. The team was disbanded after a mission retrieving Pandora's box.

== Membership ==
=== Last Wildstorm incarnation ===
- Lt. Commander John Lynch / Topkick: The team leader and former head of I.O.'s Black Razors.
- Col. Marc Slayton / Backlash: An alien soldier and former member of Team Zero, Team One, Stormwatch, and Wildcore.
- Cole Cash / Dead Eye / Grifter: An expert gunslinger and the youngest member of the team who possesses a halted aging process.
- Commander Michael Cray / Deathblow: A Navy SEAL who initially lacked psionic powers.
- Col. Jackson Dane / Arclight
- Christie Blaze

=== Former members ===
- Philip Chang / Bulleteer
- Stephen Callahan / Wraparound: A Marine who had faked his death.
- Captain Alexander Thomas Fairchild / Slaphammer: A member who was killed in action.

=== Other members ===
- Berckmann: Died from the side effects of Gen-Factor exposure.
- Robert Diaz / Bloodmoon.
- Andrew Johnson: Shot by Cole Cash for abusing his powers in sadistic ways.
- Richard MacNamara / Boloround: Committed suicide after exposure to the Gen-Factor.
- Lucius Morgan
- Jack Rhodes / Cyberjack

=== New 52 incarnation ===
- Amanda Waller
- Alex Fairchild
- James Bronson
- Cole Cash
- Dinah Drake
- John Lynch
- Kurt Lance
- Summer Ramos
- Dean Higgins
- Slade Wilson
- Steve Trevor

== Other versions ==
=== Flashpoint ===
An alternate universe iteration of Team 7 appears in Flashpoint, led by Grifter and consisting of John Stewart, Kate Kane, David Reid, Sgt. Rock, Zinda Blake, and Gunner.

== Related titles ==
Titles starring Team 7:

- Team 7 series 1
- Team 7: Objective Hell
- Team 7/Team X (intercompany crossover with Marvel Comics)
- Team 7: Dead Reckoning
- Gen 12
- The Kindred
- Wildstorm Rising (Team 7: Objective Hell #1 was the prologue and various of former members appeared in this crossover)
- Fire From Heaven series

Solo titles starring former Team 7-members:

- Backlash
- Deathblow
- Grifter

Titles starring related teams:

- DV8, featuring the children of Team 7-members.
- Gen^{13}, featuring the children of Team 7-members, John Lynch and Alex Fairchild.
- Point Blank, featuring Cole Cash, John Lynch and Marc Slayton
- Sleeper, featuring John Lynch, Cole Cash and Marc Slayton.
- Stormwatch, initially featuring Marc Slayton.
- Team One, precursor to Team 7, featuring Marc Slayton.
- Team Zero, precursor to Team 7, featuring Marc Slayton.
- Wetworks, successor to Team 7, featuring Jackson Dane.
- Wildcore, featuring Marc Slayton.
- WildC.A.T.S., featuring Cole Cash.
