= Fire from Heaven (disambiguation) =

Fire from Heaven is a novel by Mary Renault.

Fire from Heaven may also refer to:

- Fire from Heaven: A Study of Spontaneous Combustion in Human Beings, a book by Michael Harrison
- "Fire from Heaven" (comics), a Wildstorm comics company-wide story arc
- Fire from Heaven, a book in the Left Behind: The Kids series by Jerry B. Jenkins and Tim LaHaye

== See also ==
- The Fires of Heaven, a Wheel of Time novel by Robert Jordan
- Far from Heaven, a 2002 film
