= WildC.A.T.s/Aliens =

1998 comic book by Warren Ellis

- Cover of WildC.A.T.S/Aliens (August 1998), art by Gil Kane, inks by Kevin Nowlan

Publication information
- Publisher: Image Comics; Dark Horse Comics
- Format: One-shot
- Genre: Science fiction, superhero; Crossover
- Publication date: August 1998
- No. of issues: 1
- Main character(s): WildC.A.T.S; Aliens

Creative team
- Written by: Warren Ellis
- Penciller: Chris Sprouse
- Inker: Kevin Nowlan
- Letterer: Bill Oakley
- Colorist: Laura DePuy
- Editor: Scott Dunbier

Collected editions
- Stormwatch: Final Orbit: ISBN 1-56389-788-1

WildC.A.T.S/Aliens was a one-shot comic book and intercompany crossover event, published by Wildstorm (while still part of Image Comics) and Dark Horse Comics in 1998. The comic was written by Warren Ellis, pencilled by Chris Sprouse, with Kevin Nowlan inking and Laura Depuy as the colorist.

== Overview ==
The story is set between the events of Stormwatch vol 2 #10 and #11, and between WildC.A.T.S vol. 1 and vol. 2, and depicts the events which led up to the disbanding of Stormwatch and the formation of the Authority.

When the idea for the crossover was explained to him Warren Ellis was not enthusiastic; he kept telling them he thought the idea was "Bloody stupid" but was won around when "he was told that he could kill any character he wanted". It was this free hand that allowed him to clear the decks and launch a new superhero team with his own characters (the exception being Swift), the Authority. Scott Dunbier, the editor in charge at the time, explained the thinking behind this: "One of my goals was that this should be a book with lasting effects, unlike the usual cross-company epics that come and go and mean nothing. Since Warren Ellis was wrapping up his run on Stormwatch, before diving into The Authority, I thought it would be an interesting idea to kill off a large portion of the remaining Stormwatch characters, the ones that wouldn’t be moving on to the new book."

== Plot ==
The story opens with a Stormwatch escape pod, containing a scarred Flint, crash landing in New York City. The resulting rescue, retrieval, and debriefing are witnessed by Grifter and Void. Upon hearing Flint's description of the aliens, Grifter mistakenly believes the creatures to be Daemonite and quickly gathers up the original WildC.A.T.S team (sans Voodoo) for a rescue mission to the Stormwatch space station, Skywatch.

Void teleports the team to the station where they quickly uncover a video log and security tapes depicting the events that led up to the alien attack. A mysterious asteroid was passing nearby and a Stormwatch science team was dispatched to take surface samples and to plant explosives that redirect it into the sun. Skywatch lost contact with the team but their ships automatically returned to Skywatch. They quickly found themselves out of their depths and dealing with an unknown Xenomorph. The Aliens ripped through the stations, slaughtering and infecting the majority of the crew. The Stormwatch superhuman team attempted to fight them off but were ultimately wiped out, yet there were indications of a small group of survivors hidden away on the satellite.

After watching the footage, the WildC.A.T.S continue to look for the survivors, eventually finding them hidden in their cryogenic lockdown section. The survivors included Jackson King, Christine Trelane, Winter, and 96 crew members. With the help of Void, most of the crew and all of the WildC.A.T.S escaped, injured but alive. Winter, however, stayed behind to pilot the station into the sun, ensuring that the Xenomorphs were not able to spread to the Earth.

== Aftermath ==
The dead Stormwatch members were Fuji, Hellstrike, and Fahrenheit. Winter was believed dead at the time of the crossover, but later returned in an Authority one-shot, Scorched Earth. Winter's energy absorbing powers had allowed him to survive in the sun, but he had been driven mad and all the Doctor could do was imprison him there. Following Worldstorm's "reboot" of the Wildstorm Universe, the deceased members are seen back in active service, most obviously Fahrenheit who, after losing her powers, joins Stormwatch: Post Human Division. Christos Gage, the writer of that series, explained that the subtle changes in the post-Worldstorm Wildstorm Universe may have allowed a solution to the problem to be found, which was helped by a new Doctor—one without drug problems. The background to this is given in Stormwatch: PHD #5, according to Gage, "Whatever the cause, the new Doctor was able to restore Winter to human form, and as we saw, the other characters were linked to him on a quantum level, held in stasis in a pocket dimension, so they came back as well.".

Stormwatch Black (Jenny Sparks, Jack Hawksmoor and Swift) were not on board the station and made no appearances during the crossover. They would go on to form the core of the new team: the Authority.

== Collected editions ==
The issue was a one-shot but has been collected in a trade paperback:

- Stormwatch: Final Orbit (includes Stormwatch vol. 2 #10-11 and WildC.A.T.s/Aliens, ISBN 1-56389-788-1)
- DC Comics/Dark Horse Comics: Aliens (includes WildC.A.T.s/Aliens, ISBN 978-1-4012-6636-3)

== See also ==
- "Change or Die", the storyline that ended the first series of Stormwatch
