= Wildcore =

Comic book series

- Wildcore #1

Publication information
- Publisher: Wildstorm (Image Comics)
- Publication date: November 1997 – December 1998
- No. of issues: 10
- Main character(s): Backlash, Taboo, Zealot, Ferrian, Vigor, Brawl, Styrian, Alea, Azrum, Geist, Crimson (unofficial member)

Creative team
- Created by: Sean Ruffner, Brett Booth

Wildcore was an American comic book series created and co-written by writer Sean Ruffner and artist Brett Booth debuting in 1997. Focusing on a team of superheroes of the same name, it was published by Wildstorm comics, then still a part of Image Comics, as a continuation of the series Backlash. After the series was canceled, the team's final story was told in the pages of Gen-Active, an anthology series.

== History ==
The story of Wildcore starts in the pages of Backlash, where Marc Slayton (aka Backlash) and his girlfriend Amanda Reed (aka Taboo) work with the U.S. government's secret organization Department PSI. Slayton had collected a group of superhuman agents to assist him in his missions, but at the beginning of Wildcore, many of these agents have left or are reassigned. As a replacement, Wildcore is formed to combat the alien D'rahn.

The D'rahn are an ancient enemy of the Kherubim and Daemonites, who have appeared again after millennia of absence and are planning on taking over the world and the galaxy. The D'rahn claim the Kherubim, their former allies, betrayed them and therefore want revenge on the Kherubim first and foremost. Backlash, being half-Kherubim, and Ferrian, a full-blood Kherubim, are both members of Wildcore, making Wildcore a primary target for the D'rahn. Department PSI director Antonio Giovanni also hires Zealot, another Kherubim, who has experience fighting the D'rahn.

Zealot is sent to infiltrate the Norfolk Naval base, where General Gant resides. Gant, as the leader of the Puritans (a group of humans who plan on eliminating all aliens on Earth), has a list with all suspected aliens on Earth. The D'rahn plan on obtaining the list so they can locate and strike against the remaining Kherubim on Earth. The Norfolk Naval base is protected by the Chasers, a group of superhumans, but when the D'rahn attack, the Chasers turn out to be no match for them. Zealot, Gant, and the Chaser leader Brawl survive the D'rahn's initial attack, but it turns out that Gant is a Daemonite. Gant and his Daemonites make a deal with the D'rahn: they will serve the D'rahn and, in return, the D'rahn will spare them. The D'rahn then reveal their special ability, Enlightenment, which allows them to change a being into a more powerful version. The D'rahn enlighten Gant's Daemonites. Wildcore is sent in and they manage to delete most of the list, but ten names remain on it. Brawl joins Wildcore and the team sets out to protect the names on the list.

=== On the offensive ===
The first target is Guy Blackfoot, but Wildcore is too late. Blackfoot is killed and one of the D'rahn enlightens his fiancé Alea, changing her into a superhuman. Meanwhile, Zealot and Ferrian ask Mister Majestic for assistance against the D'rahn. It is also revealed that the mage Azrum, part of Backlash's former group in Department PSI, was asked by Giovanni to seek out the witch Tapestry, hoping to use her magic against the D'rahn. Azrum hasn't contacted them since, so Wildcore decides to go on the offensive; Department PSI has located the D'rahn's base and Wildcore attacks. They are joined by Majestic and he kills the D'rahn's leader, Typhon. The D'rahn retreat to regroup.

Wildcore goes to investigate Azrum's disappearance and finds that Tapestry has captured him. Tapestry uses her magic to enslave Zealot and wants to reshape the world in her image. The other Wildcore members manage to interfere with the spell. Wildcore and Tapestry are now on a medieval fantasy-type world and no longer remember their past. Only Ferrian manages to regain his memory and he gathers his former team to oppose Tapestry. They succeed and return to Earth, but Styrian is killed and Geist follows them back to Earth. Zealot leaves the team shortly afterward.

=== Final mission ===
Wildcore assists in the worldwide emergency caused by Jacob Krigstein's super-powered agents attacking the world's major capitals.

Geist eventually joined Wildcore and Alea became an active member. Wildcore was sent to Antarctica to quell a riot in Purgatory Maximum Security Penitentiary, nicknamed Purgatory Max, a prison for dangerous superhumans. Supervillain Baron Tödt (see notes) and his group, the Axis, had entered the prison, killed all personnel and released all prisoners. Wildcore entered the prison, separating along the way. The inmates proceeded to overpower the separated Wildcore members, seemingly killing most of them. Taboo was saved by inmate Hangman, a prisoner seeking salvation. He warned her that the prison is about to explode. Backlash found the explosives a second before they detonated, and was caught in the blast, resulting in the loss of his left leg. Another inmate, former DV8 member Evo, who had been Hangman's cellmate, saved Backlash and took him outside. Being severely injured, Evo, Backlash and Taboo all collapsed outside the prison. Hangman congratulated Evo on doing the right thing, activated Backlash's beacon, and left. Department PSI arrived and found five bodies, telling his subordinates to take them back to a hospital and that all others must have died. (see notes)

While Marc convalesced at a hospital, Jodi Slayton, his daughter, who had become the super-hero known as Jet, decides to avenge her father by looking for the individuals involved in the riot and capturing them, spending months fighting criminals and searching for clues. Midnighter was asked to do the same by former Stormwatch member Jackson King and assists Jet for a while, but allows her to handle things herself as she wishes.

Marc eventually recovered from the ordeal, gaining a cybernetic leg, replacing his severed leg.

== Characters ==
- Backlash (Marc Slayton): leader of Wildcore, Colonel Marc Slayton is half-Kherubim/half-human and has been active as a warrior and superhero for centuries, even though he couldn't remember most of it. Backlash can generate whips made of energy and turn himself into mist.
- Taboo (Amanda Reed): Marc's girlfriend, Taboo gains her powers from a vampiric, symbiotic costume grafted to her body. The costume allows her to fly, increases her strength and durability, and gives her psionic powers.
- Zealot (Lady Zannah): A Kherubim warrior and former WildC.A.Ts member, Zealot joined to stop the D'rahn but left the team before the Purgatory Max mission and returned to the WildC.A.Ts. As she was hired by Giovanni without Slayton's consent, there were frequent clashes between Backlash and Zealot on matters of leadership.
- Ferrian: Another Kherubim, Ferrian was Marc Slayton's guardian during his youth. Highly intelligent, Ferrian serves as the team's strategist. He is also a capable warrior and has psychometric powers.
- Vigor (Richard Vincent): An archaeologist and friend of Ferrian. Vigor has limitless stamina and can fire energy blasts from a gem he wears on his forehead.
- Brawl: former leader of the Chasers, Brawl joined Wildcore to avenge his teammates' death at the hands of the D'rahn. Brawl has superhuman strength and durability.
- Styrian (Omar Kamadev): The son of Antonio Giovanni's best friend, Styrian was placed on the team without Backlash knowing anything about him. Styrian had a romantic relationship with Jodi, Slayton's daughter, which caused some tension between the two, but Styrian died saving Backlash. Styrian could fly and control the weather.
- Alea (last name unknown): Fiancé of D'rahn victim Guy Blackfoot, Alea was changed into a superhuman being by the D'rahn Pildra, who intended to use her as a Trojan horse. Alea was part of Wildcore but was still training during most missions. She was with the team on the Purgatory Max mission and was killed during the mission. Her skin was changed into a ruby-like substance, giving her superhuman strength, durability, and the ability to absorb and re-emit energy.
- Geist: Taboo's lover on Tapestry's world, he secretly followed her to Earth. Unable to handle Taboo's change in personality and to a human, he lashed out in anger against Wildcore but was defeated. Geist was with the team for the Purgatory Max mission and was killed during the mission. Geist had the ability to blend into the background. He also displayed incredible agility and fighting skills.
- Azrum: A powerful Image, Azrum initially wasn't part of Wildcore, but he was sent to find Tapestry as the D'rahn had no defense against magic. He was with the team for the Purgatory Max mission and was killed during the mission.
- Crimson/Jet (Jodi Slayton): Though officially not a member of Wildcore, Jodi went on most missions with them. She had a relationship with Styrian and was shocked by his death. She left Department PSI and changed her name to Jet.
- Antonio Giovanni, head of Department PSI.

== Notes ==
- Only Evo, Backlash, and Taboo are seen on-panel as survivors when Hangman disappears. Department PSI finds five bodies though, so two other Wildcore members may have survived. These two others are not Azrum, Geist, or Alea, as one of Giovanni's men asks about them. Except for Backlash, none of the other members have been seen since.
