= Apollo (DC Comics) =

Comic book superhero

- Apollo, Art by Phil Jimenez

Publication information
- Publisher: Wildstorm (DC Comics)
- First appearance: Stormwatch (vol. 2) #4 (February 1998)
- Created by: Warren Ellis; Bryan Hitch

In-story information
- Alter ego: Andrew Pulaski
- Species: Human with artificial enhancements (Wildstorm universe); Metahuman (DC universe)
- Team affiliations: The Authority; Stormwatch; Justice League Queer
- Partnerships: Midnighter
- Notable aliases: Sun King
- Abilities: Solar-based being capable of absorbing solar energy and converting it into immense physical strength and speed release blasts of laser-like heat vision through his eyes Regenerative healing factor Light manipulation Invulnerability; Flight; Enhanced senses

Apollo is a superhero who first appeared in the Stormwatch series, but is best known for his role in The Authority. While visually distinct, Apollo is cast in the mould of the Superman archetype.

Apollo is notable for being among the first openly gay superheroes in print, although several years behind Marvel Comics' Northstar. He married fellow Authority member Midnighter and both adopted Jenny Quantum.

== Fictional character history ==
=== Stormwatch ===
Warren Ellis introduced the character shortly after taking over writing duties on the Stormwatch title, when he had Apollo and Midnighter encounter the then-active Stormwatch team. The story was set in 1998, immediately after Bendix's fall, when Christine Trelane had cracked Bendix's old files and discovered evidence that two rogue former Bendix agents remained alive. In flashbacks, Apollo was introduced as a member of a "black ops" Stormwatch team so secret that no one but the first Weatherman, Henry Bendix, knew of its existence. Apollo's solar-powered abilities—including super-strength, heat vision, and a high degree of invulnerability—were presented as the consequence of Bendix's bioengineering.

The first story arc (collected in the Stormwatch trade paperback A Finer World) described how, of the seven-member team, only Apollo and Midnighter survived, going rogue after their first Stormwatch Black mission and spending five years undercover fighting for a finer world in the alleyways of America. Jackson King intercepted them on a mission to seize weapons made in the "Nevada Garden", a leftover of the first Engineer. He ordered Fahrenheit and Hellstrike to tag them with fetishes so they could be transported into SkyWatch. At first Apollo and Midnighter attacked the Stormwatch team, believing them under Bendix's orders. However, they ceased the attack once they were told Bendix was dead. With King's help, they destroyed the Nevada Garden, and Trelane gave them new lives away from Stormwatch.

=== The Authority (vol. 1) ===
In 1999, when Warren Ellis concluded his run on Stormwatch with the Final Orbit storyline which saw the team destroyed, Apollo was one of several Stormwatch characters he retained for his new Wildstorm title, The Authority. In it, Apollo (along with Midnighter) was recruited by Jenny Sparks for a new team, the Authority, under her leadership. The new series picked up themes Ellis had explored in Stormwatch, including the political potential of a team more powerful than world governments and the United Nations.

Apollo featured prominently in early story arcs, producing a miles-long wall of flame to contain super clones attacking London, rescuing civilians from disaster zones, and shooting down invaders from a parallel universe. In The Authority #10, Apollo sterilised the moon, killing the alien parasites that were using it as a base from which to attack Earth. He formed a friendship with leader Jenny Sparks, and his relationship with Midnighter was revealed in The Authority #8, written by Warren Ellis. For the portrayal of Apollo and Midnighter, The Authority received a GLAAD award.

The fourth Authority story arc saw Jenny Sparks die with the end of the 20th century and the Authority join a battle with U.S. government-backed superhumans to secure custody of her successor, Jennifer Quantum, the infant spirit of the 21st century. During this battle, Apollo was severely beaten by Storm God, a Thor pastiche, and The Commander, a Captain America pastiche. In one of author Mark Millar's most controversial scenes, it was implied that the beating was followed by a rape (The Authority #14). The rape was followed by a scene of revenge, in which it is implied that Midnighter raped the Commander with a jackhammer.

In another Millar-penned story, the Authority faced a rogue Doctor, intent on planetary destruction. Though this Doctor ultimately repented of his crimes, Apollo killed him with his eye-beams. Apollo featured also in the Transfer of Power storyline, in which the Authority was defeated, captured and usurped by sadistic, government-controlled replacements. Apollo was kept aboard the Carrier and brutalised by Midnighter's and his own replacements. The latter tried to rape Apollo before the real Midnighter returned to kill Apollo's assailant. Apollo himself then burned the head off Midnighter's replacement, later doing the same to the Machine, who had taken the powers of the Engineer.

Apollo and Midnighter were married and adopted Jenny Quantum at the end of Millar's run. From this point on, Apollo is referred to as Midnighter's husband, and vice versa.

=== The Authority (vol. 2) ===
Apollo received comparatively little attention during this volume, although his friendship with the Engineer was developed and the two became confidants.

=== Human on the Inside ===
In this standalone graphic novel, the U.S. president ordered an assault on the Authority which saw them nearly defeated by doubts, depression and human foibles. Each team member's weakness was exploited; in Apollo's case this appeared to be jealousy in his relationship with Midnighter, who confessed to Apollo that he had kissed another man. Apollo, enraged, hit Midnighter hard enough to knock him through several walls. This scene remains the only canonical indication of violence between the two.

=== Authority: Coup D'Etat and Authority: Revolution ===
Authority: Coup D'État was a Wildstorm universe crossover event, in which—following a deadly mistake by U.S. leaders—Authority team leader Jack Hawksmoor decided to remove the U.S. executive branch and have the Authority itself run the country. The takeover went smoothly, but the occupation did not go as planned. Shadowy forces intervened to destroy the Authority and put corporate interests back in power. Apollo's part in the story involved traveling with Midnighter to raid the base of Stormwatch: Team Achilles. They arrived to find it booby-trapped. After narrowly escaping with their lives, their next mission was to eliminate the U.S. military's superhuman training camp. Midnighter returned with the declaration that the program was "not so special".

In Authority: Revolution, a 12-part series by Ed Brubaker and Dustin Nguyen, Apollo was left to raise Jenny Quantum alone for three years after Midnighter, having received a sinister revelation about the future, left the Authority. The story described the break-up of the Authority after a humiliating nuclear incident destroys Washington D.C., precipitating the break-up of the team. The story turned on Jenny Quantum's decision, at age eight, to reform the team. To Apollo's initial horror she caused herself to jump in age to 14 years; after convincing him to support her, she set about rounding up the surviving members of the Authority, including Midnighter. In a painful moment between Jenny, Apollo and Midnighter, Jenny described herself to Midnighter as "the product of a broken home".

In the battle that followed, it became clear that Henry Bendix had gained control over Midnighter through a Trojan Horse strategy which delivered nanites into Midnighter's body. Midnighter fought with Jenny and then Apollo, regaining clarity for just long enough to beg Apollo to kill him if he got the chance. Apollo refused and was defeated, but Jenny was able to engage Midnighter for long enough for the Engineer to remove the mind-control implants and restore Midnighter.

=== Earth-50 ===
In 2006–2007, DC Comics's year-long weekly limited series, 52, identified the Wildstorm Universe as part of the DC Multiverse. Apollo, along with other Authority characters, appeared in several DC Universe titles as part of the crossover comics that followed, including in the 2007 series Countdown: Arena, where he is shown as the closest "Earth-50" (Wildstorm Universe) approximation of DC Comics (and formerly Quality Comics) character the Ray, who is a member of the Freedom Fighters, and, as such, is also a counterpart of several other alternate versions of the Ray. However, Apollo is also traditionally viewed as a Superman analogue. Countdown: Arena writer Keith Champagne described the Ray-Apollo relationship on his blog:

"Because Majestic is more or less the Superman analogue from Wildstorm. Of all the Wildstorm characters, I wanted Apollo in the book and, with Superman spoken for, the best match we could come up with was The Ray due to the solar-powered connection. It doesn't necessarily mean Apollo is a Ray analogue, just that Monarch grouped him together with the other two".

Final Crisis #7 depicts Apollo and Mister Majestic as both being Superman analogues for their Earth.

=== World's End ===
The 2008 Number of the Beast Wildstorm miniseries described the devastation of Earth and set the scene for a new Authority ongoing series, World's End, by Dan Abnett and Andy Lanning. In this series, Apollo is separated from Midnighter and the rest of the Authority when a thick layer of smog covers the Earth, preventing sunlight from reaching the surface. Apollo is forced to remain in the photosphere to absorb the radiation he needs to survive, visiting the surface only briefly to help the team. While on the surface, environmental conditions sap his powers, giving him a gaunt appearance and limiting his ability to fight.

He is later infected by the Warhol Fever, a superpower-inducing virus, that evolves and becomes sentient by incubating in his body. Claiming to be The Burn, the virus overrides his mind and attempts to escape into The Bleed. The Authority is forced to put Apollo in suspended animation, frozen and in an anaerobic room to keep the infection from spreading. He is eventually cured when Midnighter feeds him a piece of fruit he receives from the Century Baby, Gaia Rothstein.

When the Authority reorganises and takes the Carrier into space, Apollo elects to stay on Earth, as he might be powerless during extended space travel. Midnighter stays with him.

=== The New 52 ===
Following the events of Flashpoint, the Wildstorm universe is merged with the DC Universe, creating new backstories for many characters. Along with 51 other titles, Stormwatch relaunched with an issue #1 as part of DC's The New 52 company-wide revamp. In the new universe, Apollo starts off as a superpowered young man who first comes to the attention of Stormwatch after he uses his abilities to murder a child molester. Subsequently, a website uses Photoshop to create an image of Apollo battling Superman, the idea of which ultimately convinces Stormwatch to recruit him. Jack Hawksmoor, the Projectionist, and Martian Manhunter hunt down Apollo and attempt to recruit him into the team, but he refuses, and a fight ensues. Just as he is overpowered, Midnighter arrives and defeats the Stormwatch members and then proposes a partnership between himself and Apollo. He and Midnighter gradually realise they are attracted to one another over the course of 18 issues, before DC restored its pre-reboot characterisations and designs for Midnighter and Apollo in its March 2013 Stormwatch #19. It then restored them to the original New 52 designs with the series' final issue, Stormwatch #30, in preparation for DC's The New 52: Futures End comic series, which is set to heavily feature former Wildstorm characters. Vaguely remembering a few weeks in an "alternate timeline" (Stormwatch #19-29), Apollo and Midnighter are nevertheless now a couple again, and Jenny Quantum is a team member again.

Beginning with the new Midnighter series of 2015, Apollo and Midnighter are no longer a couple, due to conflicts over Midnighter's violent nature. They remain friends, however, with Midnighter sending Apollo a photo of himself as a boy when he discovers a file on his secret origin.

=== DC: Rebirth ===
The character appears again along with his boyfriend, Midnighter, for a six-issue miniseries titled Midnighter and Apollo, continuing in the New 52 canon. Midnighter and Apollo have gotten back together as a couple. Apollo is attacked and his soul trapped in a hell dimension where he is detained by Neron.

Writer Steve Orlando told The Advocate that "I would say I feel pressure to showcase a realistic relationship, and that means neither an unattainable, idealized vision or an overly dysfunctional one. Real relationships are work, and I want to treat Midnighter and Apollo with the same respect, passion, and intricacy we all deal with in our own relationships on a daily basis".

== Powers and abilities ==
Apollo's powers include superhuman strength, flight, and near invulnerability (the character has been shown entering a lava flow to deactivate a volcano, and walking on the surface of the Sun). His eyes are constructed to concentrate solar energy into laser-like blasts. Apollo can also release his solar energy from other parts of his body or in an omnidirectional flare, but these moves are taxing. He can fly fast enough to circle the globe in 30 seconds.

Like Superman, Apollo's powers are dependent on sunlight, but Apollo's powers diminish rapidly when he is not exposed to sunlight whereas Superman's powers diminish at a negligibly slow rate. From the point of exhaustion, he can regain the capacity for flight from 20 seconds of sun exposure. Two hours in sunlight restores him to full capacity. Transporting (using the Carrier's 'Door' system) into close proximity with the Sun allows him to recharge more quickly.

Since Apollo's energy derives entirely from the sun, he can survive in anaerobic environments indefinitely. He was shown in early issues of The Authority flying without protective equipment in space, explaining he could do so by the simple method of not breathing. He also does not require food or drink, though he apparently enjoys both.

Apollo has been described a number of times as a Majestic-class superhuman, suggesting that his powers are near the level of Mister Majestic, or are at least similarly beyond the frame of reference of most superhumans. In The New 52: Futures End #4, Apollo is described by Father Time as a "Superman-level" superhuman.

== Alternative versions ==
=== Wildstorm Winter Special 2005 ===
In Wildstorm Winter Special 2005, a story called Apollo & Midnighter: Two Dangerous Ideas features their alternate reality analogues, Pluto and Daylighter, with inverted color schemes to match. At first the real Midnighter believed that Daylighter was homophobic, but later learned that Pluto and Daylighter were a former couple that had broken up.

=== Gen^{13} ===
In Gen^{13} vol. 4 #11 (written by Gail Simone), a teenage version of Apollo is a part of a team called "The Authori-teens" named Kid Apollo in the town of Tranquility, a fictional town in California. He and the teenage Midnighter, Daybreaker, would not appear to be out of the closet, although their romantic feelings for one another are still apparent.

=== Midnighter ===
In Midnighter #6, an alternate universe single-issue story set in feudal Japan, Apollo appeared as a peaceable but skillful swordsman and lover of a samurai Midnighter.

== See also ==
- LGBT themes in comics
