= Fire from Heaven (comics) =

- Cover of Sword of Damocles 1 (Mar 1996), art by Randy Green
- Publisher: Wildstorm Comics
- Publication date: March – July 1996
- Genre: Superhero; Crossover
Title(s)
Backlash #19-20
Deathblow #26-28
Fire From Heaven #½-2
Gen^{13} vol. 1, #10-11
Sigma #1-3
Stormwatch vol. 1, #35-36
Sword Of Damocles #1-2
Wetworks #16-17
WildC.A.T.s vol. 1, #29-30

"Fire From Heaven" was a company-wide comics crossover event story arc published by American company WildStorm in 1996. The story ran across at least one issue of most WildStorm titles at the time and several independent one-shots. The story tied into many events happening in the WildStorm universe and, unlike many major crossovers of the time, Fire From Heaven had a lasting impact on many of the characters involved.

== History ==
The crossover was one of the biggest ever in comics, but had its share of problems; for example, delayed issues caused the planned reading order to change almost monthly, so much that the finale, planned to take place in Fire from Heaven #2, had to take place in Deathblow #28. Also, mandated participation in the crossover meant that many writers had to stop their own storylines to follow the storyline of the crossover. This had the side effect that none of the issues involved were self-contained and readers had to buy the whole crossover to understand the story, even with short recaps in each issue.

== Plot ==
The story dealt with the coming of Damocles (an alternate reality version of Dr. Tsung), an insane villain from another universe. On Earth, Damocles' opponent from his homeworld had been reborn as the superhero Sigma. Damocles was assisted in his quest by the Sword (an alternate reality version of Union), a group of alien bounty hunters (including One-Eyed Jack, Jade, Rake, Hardball and Tode) the fake Kaizen Gamorra and Miles Craven. Most of the story took place on the island-state Gamorra, with a finale on the moon that involved most of Earth's superheroes.

During the "Fire from Heaven" event, Deathblow, Miles Craven, Kaizen Gamorra, Flashpoint, and Cyberjack are killed. Additionally, Caitlin Fairchild reunites with her father, Grifter rejoins the WildC.A.T.s. Spartan recovers memories of his time as a Kherubim Lord and member of Team One, and Union comes out of retirement, leading into a new series for the hero.

== Reading order ==
1. Fire From Heaven #½

Prelude

1. Sword Of Damocles #1
2. Sigma #1
3. Deathblow #26

Chapters

1. Fire From Heaven #1
2. Backlash #19
3. Gen^{13} #10
4. Wetworks #16
5. Stormwatch #35
6. Sigma #2
7. WildC.A.T.s #29
8. Deathblow #27
9. Gen^{13} #11
10. Backlash #20
11. Wetworks #17
12. Stormwatch #36
13. WildC.A.T.s #30
14. Sigma #3

Finale

1. Sword Of Damocles #2
2. Fire From Heaven #2
3. Deathblow #28
