= Backlash (Marc Slayton) =

Comic book character

- Backlash #1 (November 1994), art by Brett Booth and Sal Regla

Publication information
- Publisher: Wildstorm Productions
- First appearance: StormWatch #3 (July 1993)
- Created by: Jim Lee; Brett Booth

In-story information
- Alter ego: Marc Slayton
- Team affiliations: International Operations; Team One; Team Zero; Team 7 StormWatch; Wildcore; Department PSI
- Notable aliases: Alex
- Abilities: Generating psionic whips Mist transformation Virtual immortality Superhuman agility

Backlash is a comic book character from the Wildstorm Universe who first appeared in StormWatch #3 in 1993. He was featured in his own comic book series, which ran from 1994 to 1997. His daughter Jodi also uses the name.

== Fictional character biography ==
Marc Slayton was born in Atlantis about three thousand years ago, the son of a human mother and Lord S'ylton, an enhanced Kherubim lord of the alien colony Atlantis. When his father sacrifices his life to imprison one-time allies the D'rahn, a race of hostile aliens whose attack leads to the sinking of Atlantis, Marc is spirited away by Ferrian, his father's former advisor. Ferrian raises Marc, tutoring him in fighting skills for his protection. Once Marc comes of age, Ferrian leaves him to fend for himself.

Marc spends the next three thousand years traveling the world. During World War II, he is recruited as an intelligence specialist for Team Zero. In the 1960s, Marc works as an Air Force Colonel in the extraterrestrial threats squad Team One. Later he joins Team 7, a special ops unit whose members are deliberately exposed to a mutagenic chemical called the Gen-Factor, giving them superpowers.

=== Stormwatch ===
Following Team 7's final mission, Marc is assigned to join StormWatch. He works as the group's field leader and instructor until he loses several members of the first team (Stormwatch Prime) during a mission in Kuwait. After this event, he switches to being a full-time instructor. When a Daemonite called S'ryn puts Marc's girlfriend Major Diane LaSalle into a coma, he deserts StormWatch to track her down, breaking Cabal agent Taboo out of prison to help him on his quest. While he eventually catches S'ryn and revives Diane, he and Taboo become lovers and fugitives.

Subsequent to this, Marc discovers he had fathered twin children—Jodi Morinaka and Aries—by an old girlfriend from Japan. He learns of Jodi when she tracks him down after her mother's death. Like her father, Jodi's alien genes give her superhuman powers, and she takes the identity of Crimson to accompany him. Backlash and Taboo arrange to be pardoned in return for working for the Department of Paranormal Science Investigations (PSI).

Marc befriends the animal-faced adventurer Dingo, who helps him out on more than one case. It is around this point Marc finally learns of his Kherubim ancestry—for reasons best known to himself, Ferrian had never told Marc. Marc is placed in charge of forming a team of superpowered operatives codenamed Wildcore for Department PSI.

=== Retirement ===
Backlash works with Wildcore until most of this team are killed trying to stop a breakout at the Purgatory Max facility. Marc survives thanks to the assistance of former DV8 member Evo who had been imprisoned for the murder of an NYPD officer. Marc loses a leg, has it replaced with an artificial one and returns to duty. Marc gives up the Backlash identity, which is taken by Jodi. Marc later appears in the series Sleeper as an agent and commander in Department PSI.

== Alternate version ==
In one alternate universe, Marc Slayton works as team leader for Stormwatch, headed by Jack Hawksmoor.

=== The Wild Storm ===
In the 2017 reboot of the WildStorm line, The Wild Storm, Marc Slayton is one of the members of Project: Thunderbook, an Internal Operations project run by former director John Lynch. Slayton and others had their DNA spliced with that of alien (Kherubim/Khera) descent, giving them superpowers. After Lynch was forced out of I/O, Project: Thunderbook was shut down, and the subjects given cover identities. Over the years, Slayton's implant became sentient and aware of its descent, allying itself with the Khera.

== Powers and abilities ==
Thanks to his Kherubim genes, Marc is virtually immortal and has accrued three thousand years of combat experience. He is an expert martial artist and trained in the use of most weapons. His agility is superhuman. Exposure to the Gen-Factor released several latent powers, including the ability to generate psychic energy whips out the backs of his hands. He can use these whips for various purposes; in combat he uses them to constrict his opponents, shocking them with the energy running through the whips or to cut through objects. He can use the energy whips as grappling hooks. The whips are very durable, but beings of great strength can break them, causing painful psionic feedback.

Marc can also transform his body and clothes into mist - as well as being useful for infiltration and defense, this also allows him to swiftly heal most injuries, which tend to vanish after transforming to mist and back. When first exposed to the Gen-Factor, Marc had extensive psionic powers including telepathy and telekinesis, but these powers waned over the years and disappeared after the Gen-Factor was removed from his body.

== Sources ==
- Backlash at the Comic Book DB (archived from the original)
- Backlash at the Comic Book DB (archived from the original)
