= Weird (character) =

The Weird
- Cover to The Weird #4, art by Bernie Wrightson

Publication information
- Publisher: DC Comics
- First appearance: The Weird #1 (April 1988)
- Created by: Jim Starlin; Bernie Wrightson

In-story information
- Species: Zarolatt
- Notable aliases: Walter Langley
- Abilities: Density manipulation Energy manipulation Flight; Non-corporeal energy form

The Weird is a fictional DC Comics character created by Jim Starlin and Bernie Wrightson. He first appeared in his own self-titled miniseries The Weird in 1988.

== Publication history ==
The Weird appeared for the first time as the protagonist in the eponymous miniseries, which presented a conclusive ending for the character and its story arc. The character later returned in a number of series written by Starlin: the 2006 Mystery in Space series, the Rann-Thanagar War (2008) limited series, and the 2009 Strange Adventures series.

== Fictional character biography ==
The Weird is a Zarolatt, an energy being originating from another dimension. For years, his people had been exploited as energy sources by a cruel race known as the Macrolatts. For unknown reasons, The Weird did not share the docile acceptance of the rest of his race. When the Macrolatts sought to bridge the dimensional gap and attack other realms, The Weird knew he had to act. Escaping through a portal to another world, The Weird found himself on Earth.

Seeking a corporeal form to contain his energy, he possessed the body of a dead man named Walter Langley. This produced a composite form which contained both The Weird's memories and traces of Langley's. In this shape, he sought out Earth's superheroes for aid and was dubbed "The Weird" by Blue Beetle. With the heroes' assistance, he was able to repel the Macrolatt invasion.

Tragically, his victory was short-lived. The Weird soon discovered that his new body was unstable and approaching critical mass. With the help of Superman and Guy Gardner, The Weird was taken to the depths of space where he detonated, ending his brief life in the physical realm.

=== Mystery in Space ===
Starlin would later return to his creation in the 2006 limited series Mystery in Space. For years, The Weird's spiritual essence floated in the void until it made contact with the disembodied spirit of Captain Comet. The intermingling of these spiritual bodies produced a reaction, resurrecting both Comet and The Weird.

Since his return, The Weird has attempted to determine the cause of his mysterious resurrection and to seek out Comet, the "other" whose memories now mingle with his own. To this end, he has sought answers within the extraterrestrial church the Eternal Light Corporation, though he has since discovered them to have a sinister agenda.

Having viewed the physical realm from outside of it, The Weird regards the universe with a more philosophical eye than most superhumans, always seeking to understand his own nature and purpose.

== The New 52 ==
The Weird becomes a member of the newly assembled Stormwatch team, debuting in issue #19.

== Powers and abilities ==
In his natural state, The Weird is a non-corporeal entity of pure energy, able to drift unaided through the void of his home dimension. Like other Zarolatts, he is unable to harness his energy for other purposes or to affect the physical realm without aid.

In his physical Walter Langley form, The Weird has the ability to alter the molecular density of his body. This allows him to become intangible and phase through walls and solid objects or to become as hard as rock, giving him increased durability and strength on par with Superman. He is also able to affect the physical density of anything he comes in contact with. The Weird is able to fly by riding magnetic currents. He can manipulate energy via contact, allowing him to perform various feats ranging from the transformation of electricity to the creation of complex illusions via the manipulation of brainwaves.

== Collected editions ==
The miniseries was reprinted in 2008 in the Mystery in Space Volume 2 trade paperback (ISBN 1-4012-1692-7).
