= Stormwatch (comics) =

Superhero team in DC Comics

Group publication information
- Publisher: WildStorm (Image Comics; after 1998: DC Comics)
- First appearance: Stormwatch #1 (March 1993)
- Created by: Jim Lee; Brandon Choi; Scott Clark; Warren Ellis (vol. 2)

In-story information
- Base(s): SkyWatch
- Member(s): Stormwatch Prime: Battalion; Synergy; Winter; Fuji; Hellstrike; Flint; Cannon; Strafe; Diva; Post-Human Division: John Doran; Fahrenheit; Paris; Gorgeous; Black Betty; The Monstrosity; The Machinist; Former members: Backlash; Martian Manhunter; Nautika; Flashpoint; Jenny Sparks; Jack Hawksmoor; Swift; Rose Tattoo; Union; Weatherman (Henry Bendix); Weatherman (William Bendix); Nina Mazursky (Futures End)

Stormwatch
- Genre: Superhero
- Creator(s): Jim Lee; Brandon Choi; Scott Clark; Warren Ellis (vol. 2)

Stormwatch is a superhero team appearing in American comic books published by WildStorm, which later became an imprint of DC Comics. Created by Jim Lee, the team first appeared in Stormwatch #1 (March 1993). After the WildStorm imprint was retired and its universe was merged with the main DC Universe, the group was depicted as a secretive team of superheroes who tackle dangerous missions while remaining unknown to the larger superhero community.

== Publication history ==
=== Stormwatch ===
Stormwatch (run by a fictional United Nations) is overseen from a satellite by its director, the Weatherman. The Weatherman was Henry Bendix, who had cybernetic implants connected to his brain to better monitor the world situation and his Stormwatch teams in action. His field commander was Jackson King (also known as Battalion, an American telekinetic). Other founding members include Hellstrike (an Irish police officer who is an energy being), Winter (an ex-Russian Spetznaz officer and an energy absorber), Fuji (a young Japanese man, an energy being trapped in a containment suit) and Diva (a young Italian woman with sonic powers).

The team first appeared in the eponymous comic book Stormwatch, published by Image Comics and owned by Jim Lee. Early writers of Stormwatch included Jim Lee, Brandon Choi, H. K. Proger and Ron Marz; early artists included Scott Clark, Brett Booth, Matt Broome and Renato Arlem.

Marz, who had worked on Marvel Comics' Silver Surfer and developed Hal Jordan's Green Lantern replacement Kyle Rayner at DC Comics, took over the writing while James Robinson was writing WildC.A.T.s. Robinson and Marz, directed by Jim Lee, intertwined the books' storylines over several months.

Around this time, two two-issue miniseries were published: Stormwatch Team One (written by James Robinson) and WildC.A.T.s Team One (written by Steven Seagle). In the intertwined miniseries, the groundwork for both teams was laid in the mid-1960s by a core group consisting of Saul Baxter (Lord Emp), Zealot, Majestic, John Colt (the template for Spartan), Backlash, a young Bendix and Jackson King's father Isaiah, all of whom would be members of (or figure prominently in) the later Stormwatch and WildC.A.T.s teams. In this series "WildStorm", the publishing imprint name, was a code word used by the United States Government: "Wild" was extraterrestrial life-forms, and "Storm" was invading forces.

Robinson's WildC.A.T.s and Marz's Stormwatch culminated in the "Wildstorm Rising" storyline, during which both teams were disrupted; Stormwatch incurred casualties, and the WildC.A.T.s were believed dead. After WildStorm Rising, Alan Moore took over the writing of WildC.A.T.s. After a second imprint-wide crossover, Warren Ellis took over writing Stormwatch with #37 (July 1996).

=== Warren Ellis and Stormwatch Vol. 2 ===
Warren Ellis's run would refocus the stories and redefine the cast of characters while tying-up the first volume (with issue #50) and spanning the entire 12-issue run of the second volume. His version of Stormwatch injected sexual and horror elements, thinly-disguised political commentary and criticism of the United States government into the stories. The accompanying art was toned down from the more-exaggerated 1990s superhero-style, which dominated the early Image Comics, helping to emphasize the science fiction aspect of the storylines. During this period Ellis used Stormwatch to introduce the concept of the Bleed, a space between parallel universes which later featured in Planetary and other comics set in the Wildstorm Universe. By the end of volume one Ellis made Henry Bendix a manipulative villain.

Ellis continued to write the book into Stormwatch volume 2, until the August 1998 WildC.A.T.s/Aliens crossover (also written by Ellis) which saw the Stormwatch team decimated by xenomorphs (the creatures from the Alien film series). Most of the Stormwatch characters Ellis had not created were killed off in this story while the surviving characters he had created became the main cast of Ellis' new series, The Authority, including Jenny Sparks, Jack Hawksmoor, Apollo, the Midnighter, and Swift (who debuted in Stormwatch vol. 1 #28, written by Jeff Mariotte) as well as two new characters who were successors of the Engineer and the Doctor from Ellis' "Change or Die" storyline. Stormwatch volume 2 ended with a story, set after WildC.A.T.s/Aliens, in which the United Nations disbanded Stormwatch. The last scene, a conversation between former members of Stormwatch Black, introduced The Authority and promoted its first issue. Other survivors from the original team (including Battalion, Christine Trelane, and Flint) appeared briefly in The Authority, and King and Trelane became central characters of The Monarchy.

Ellis's use of concepts and characters he developed in Stormwatch extended into other WildStorm projects as well. Notably, Planetary. In the 11th issue of Planetary, John Stone, a secret agent modeled after a combination of James Bond and Nick Fury (of Jim Steranko's Nick Fury, Agent of S.H.I.E.L.D.) works for a 1960s precursor of Stormwatch named S.T.O.R.M., working out of a command center known as S.T.O.R.M. Watch. References were also made to Jenny Sparks, the Bleed, and the ability to teleport via portals referred to as "doors."

=== Stormwatch: Team Achilles ===
In September 2002, Stormwatch was revived as Stormwatch: Team Achilles, written by Micah Ian Wright. The series followed a human UN troubleshooting team dealing with superhuman-related problems. The planned final issue (#24) was never published, although its script is available for download online.

=== Stormwatch: Post Human Division ===
Stormwatch was one of several comic books restarted after Wildstorm Comics' WorldStorm event. This version was launched in November 2006 with writer Christos Gage and penciller Doug Mahnke. The series ended after issue #12, but resumed in August 2008 as part of the World's End event with issue #13. In the new series several dead characters (Hellstrike, Fuji, Winter and Fahrenheit) were resurrected and reformed as the new version of Stormwatch Prime (now sponsored by the United States), and a separate branch office — Stormwatch: P.H.D. (Post-Human Division) — was opened in New York.

=== The New 52 ===
Stormwatch (vol. 3)

Publication information
- Publisher: DC Comics
- Schedule: Monthly
- Format: Ongoing
- Publication date: September 2011 – April 2014
- No. of issues: 30

Creative team
- Written by: Paul Cornell; Peter Milligan; Jim Starlin; Sterling Gates
- Artist(s): Miguel Sepulveda; Yvel Guichet; Jeremy Roberts

DC Comics announced in June 2011 that the team would be incorporated into the DC Universe in a new series, written by Paul Cornell and drawn by Miguel Sepulveda, as part of the September 2011 relaunch of its comics. Peter Milligan took over the book in issue nine after leaving Justice League Dark with issue eight.

This Stormwatch, an organization which has protected Earth from alien threats since the Dark Ages, is commanded by a group known as the Shadow Cabinet: a four-member group of Shadow Lords referred to as "the dead", and represented by an entity which can negate the group's powers and is aware of their secrets (except Harry's). Rejecting the title "superheroes", Stormwatch — Jack Hawksmoor, Apollo, Midnighter, Jenny Quantum, the Engineer, the Martian Manhunter (who left the team after wiping everyone's memory of him), and three new characters: Adam One (an immortal born during the Big Bang, who was later revealed to be Merlin), Emma Rice, the Projectionist (who controls the mass media) and Harry Tanner, the Eminence of Blades (the world's greatest swordsman) — exist in secret and consider themselves professional soldiers. Their base is a hijacked Daemonite spaceship in Hyperspace, later upgraded into the Carrier.

Jim Starlin wrote Stormwatch with #19, erasing the team's history as a 1,000-year-old organization and restarting its history again. Apollo and Midnighter were returned to their original costumes as the core of a new Stormwatch team with the Engineer, Hellstrike, the Weird and new characters Jenny Soul, the Forecaster, and Force. After Starlin's run ended with #29, Sterling Gates wrote the series' 30th and final issue which restored the previous version of the team. The team then appeared in The New 52: Futures End weekly limited series.

== Collections ==
Ellis' run on Stormwatch was collected into five trade paperbacks:

- Force of Nature (collects Stormwatch Volume 1 #37-42, 160 pages, January 2000, Titan Books, ISBN 1-84023-611-6, Wildstorm, ISBN 1-56389-646-X)
- Lightning Strikes (collects Stormwatch Volume 1 #43-47, 144 pages, April 2000, Titan Books, ISBN 1-84023-617-5, Wildstorm, ISBN 1-56389-650-8)
- Change or Die (collects Stormwatch Volume 1 #48-50, preview and Volume 2 #1-3, 176 pages, July 1999, Titan Books, ISBN 1-84023-631-0, Wildstorm, ISBN 1-56389-534-X)
- A Finer World (collects Stormwatch Volume 2 #4-9, 144 pages, July 1999, Titan Books, ISBN 1-84023-291-9, Wildstorm, ISBN 1-56389-535-8)
- Final Orbit (collects Stormwatch Volume 2 #10-11 and WildC.A.T.S/Aliens, 96 pages, Titan Books, ISBN 1-84023-381-8, Wildstorm, September 2001, ISBN 1-56389-788-1)

Stormwatch: Team Achilles was collected into two trade paperbacks:

- Stormwatch: Team Achilles Vol. 1 (collects Stormwatch: Team Achilles #1-6, DC Comics, December 2003, ISBN 1401201032)
- Stormwatch: Team Achilles Vol. 2 (collects Stormwatch: Team Achilles #7-11, DC Comics, January 2004, ISBN 1401201237)

Stormwatch: Post-Human Division was collected into four trade paperbacks:

- Stormwatch PHD Vol. 1 (collects Stormwatch PHD #1-4, #6-7, DC Comics, July 2007, ISBN 1401215009)
- Stormwatch PHD Vol. 2 (collects Stormwatch PHD #5, #8-12, DC Comics, April 2008, ISBN 1401216781)
- Stormwatch PHD: World's End (collects Stormwatch PHD #13-19, DC Comics, October 2009, ISBN 140122489X)'
- Stormwatch PHD: Unnatural Species (collects Stormwatch PHD #20-24, DC Comics, ISBN 1401228526)

The New 52 version of Stormwatch was collected into four trade paperbacks:

- Stormwatch Vol. 1: The Dark Side (collects Stormwatch Volume 3 #1-6, 144 pages, DC Comics, May 2012, ISBN 1-40123-483-6)
- Stormwatch Vol. 2: Enemies of Earth (collects Stormwatch Volume 3 #7-12 and Red Lanterns #10, 160 pages, DC Comics, February 2013, ISBN 1-40123-848-3)
- Stormwatch Vol. 3: Betrayal (collects Stormwatch Volume 3 #0, #13-18 DC Comics, Sept. 2013. ISBN 1-40124-315-0)
- Stormwatch Vol. 4: Reset (collects Stormwatch Volume 3 #19-30, 272 pages, DC Comics, Jun. 2014, ISBN 1-40124-841-1)

== See also ==
- List of Stormwatch members
- List of government agencies in DC Comics
- United Nations in popular culture
