= Hellstrike =

Publication information
- Publisher: WildStorm
- First appearance: Stormwatch #1 (March 1993)
- Created by: Brandon Choi; Jim Lee; Scott Clark

In-story information
- Alter ego: Nigel Keane
- Team affiliations: Stormwatch; Scotland Yard
- Abilities: Project explosive bolts of plasma, flight

Hellstrike (Nigel Keane) is a comic book superhero in the WildStorm's Stormwatch series, first appearing in Stormwatch #1. He possesses the ability to project plasma as destructive bolts or as an energy stream to allow himself to fly. In Issue #12, Hellstrike begins using a containment suit similar to Fuji's.

== Fictional character biography ==
Nigel Keane was born in Belfast and served in the British police constabulary in Belfast for some years before moving to London. There, he falls in love with Anne, his partner while investigating the IRA. Their relationship lasts until the mercenary Seamus O'Brien kills Anne in front of him. In the ensuing fight, Keane is mortally wounded, but survives after manifesting superpowers. O'Brien later became the villain Deathtrap, with Hellstrike bearing a grudge against him for Anne's murder.

Hellstrike joins StormWatch One, the main team of superheroes serving the United Nations. In the Wildstorm universe, the UN is secretly a worldwide conspiracy led by the Secret Masters. The operatives of StormWatch are ruthless and do not hesitate to violate the rights of a country to aid their cause.

During a battle with Deathtrap, Hellstrike is severely injured and begins to lose cohesion and become pure energy. Fuji contacts Hellstrike in his comatose state and persuades him that his life was still worth living. Hellstrike receives a tailor-made containment suit, much like Fuji's, which prevents him from dissipating or exploding.

=== Reformation ===
When Henry Bendix reshapes StormWatch, Hellstrike joins StormWatch Prime, a unit devoted to dealing with superhuman threats. At some point, he began a relationship with Fahrenheit that they kept secret until Weatherman Battalion found out. Hellstrike was killed by Xenomorphs during the WildC.A.T.s/Aliens crossover, along with Fahrenheit, Fuji, and others.

=== Rebirth ===
Hellstrike and his other dead teammates return, partly detailed in the series Stormwatch: Post Human Division. The four play a support role to the PHD team, a compressed version of Stormwatch deeply affected by budget cuts. Hellstrike is featured in a flashback in issue #2 as Fahrenheit fondly recalls his assistance in a fight against the criminal known as 'The Walking Ghost'. Hellstrike later helps the PHD team escape the ice-encased precinct house they use as a headquarters.

Hellstrike is seen rescuing humans in need in a post-apocalypse Earth. He is being pessimistic because the place they are evacuating the humans to is also suffering problems.

=== The New 52 ===
In September 2011, The New 52 rebooted the continuity of the DC Comics universe. In this new timeline, which merged the WildStorm and DC Universes, Hellstrike is reintroduced as a member of the secondary group that forms after a time warp erases the original team from existence.

== Powers and abilities ==
Hellstrike is a seedling (mutant), the people who were genetically affected by the Comet Effect of the 1960s. He is made of pure energy and can fire explosive plasma bolts, create plasma shields, and fly by means of his energy jet stream. In later appearances, Hellstrike uses a containment suit that prevents him from dispersing. Hellstrike is immune to telepathy due to being more energy in nature than human.

Formerly a Scotland Yard inspector, he also proved to be a valuable asset in non-combat situation. Having operated initially in Northern Ireland, he is particularly good at counter-terrorism.
