= Brett Booth =

Artist

- Areas: Writer, Penciller
- Notable works: Teen Titans; Backlash

Brett Booth is an American comic book artist. He is best known for his work on Backlash, a character he co-created with Jim Lee at the Wildstorm Studios.

== Biography ==
Following his Wildstorm work, Booth has also illustrated the exploits of some of Marvel Comics' best known characters such as Spider-Man, the Fantastic Four, and the X-Men.

The artist then expanded his career when he contributed illustrations for the book Freaks! How To Draw Fantastic Fantasy Creatures.

He is currently active as a paleoartist drawing dinosaurs for various publications and websites as well as continuing to draw comic books. Booth designed the cover of the Dynamite Entertainment horror comic Vampire Huntress Neteru. He illustrated DC Comics' Justice League of America vol. 2 with author James Robinson from issue #54 until #60, the title's final issue.

On July 6, 2011, it was announced that Booth will be handling the pencilling duties on the new Teen Titans #1 that comes out as part of The New 52. Booth also drew for Kyle Higgin's Nightwing vol. 2.
