= Midnighter =

DC Comics superhero

- Cover of Midnighter and Apollo #4 (2016), drawn by Aco.

Publication information
- Publisher: Wildstorm (DC Comics)
- First appearance: Stormwatch (vol. 2) #4 (February 1998)
- Created by: Warren Ellis; Bryan Hitch

In-story information
- Alter ego: Unknown
- Species: Human with artificial enhancements (Wildstorm universe); Metahuman (DC universe)
- Team affiliations: The Authority; Stormwatch; Spyral; Justice League Queer
- Partnerships: Apollo
- Notable aliases: Lucas Trent
- Abilities: Enhanced physical attributes; Temporary pain suppression; Auxiliary heart; Neurotactical wetware; Master combatant; Multilingualism; Stealth; Weapon expertise; Skilled tactician

Midnighter is a superhero appearing in American comic books first published by WildStorm and later DC Comics once it absorbed the former. The character was created by writer Warren Ellis and artist Bryan Hitch. The character made his first appearance in Stormwatch (vol. 2) #4, titled "A Finer World (Part 1 of 3)" (February 1998). He went on to appear in various Authority books and other series, as well as his own eponymous ongoing series.

Midnighter is best known as a member of the rogue superhero team the Authority. He and his husband, Apollo, have also been interpreted as a parallel of the Batman/Superman World's Finest partnership.

In an interview for Comic Values Annual (1999), edited by Alex G. Malloy, Warren Ellis described Midnighter as "The Shadow by way of John Woo". Midnighter is rarely seen without his costume and mask. Recurring themes in Midnighter's adventures are his love of violence and killing, as well as comments on his sexuality.

In 2011, DC chose to integrate the characters from the Wildstorm Universe with its mainstream DC Universe setting. Since then, Midnighter has appeared in a solo series, plus the team-up books Midnighter and Apollo, The Authority, and Superman and the Authority. The character has also been featured as part of the supporting cast for the superhero Nightwing, Batman's protégé Dick Grayson, with whom he becomes good friends. Although until 2021 Midnighter and Batman had never met on-panel, the character has become increasingly integrated with the wider Batman supporting cast.

== Publication history and fictional character biography ==
=== Stormwatch ===
Warren Ellis created and introduced the character in 1998 in Stormwatch vol. 2 #4, soon after his appointment as writer on the title. The issue introduces Midnighter and Apollo as former Stormwatch agents from a secret black ops team known only to the first Weatherman, Henry Bendix. In the first issue of the arc, collected in trade paperback as A Finer World, Christine Trelane had cracked the files of the recently deposed Bendix and discovered Apollo and Midnighter's existence. The new Weatherman, Jackson King, intercepts them on a mission to seize weapons made in the "Nevada Garden", a bioengineering facility created by the first Engineer. Flashback sequences show Midnighter and Apollo, the sole survivors of their seven-member team's sinister first mission, escaping Bendix and going rogue to spend five years fighting crime on the streets of the US. Midnighter and Apollo initially resist their capture, believing Stormwatch still to be under Bendix's command. On learning of his death, they end their opposition and accept a mission from King to destroy the Nevada Garden. To repay their assistance, Trelane grants Midnighter and Apollo new civilian identities and lives away from Stormwatch. This story arc introduces Midnighter's trademark enhancements, his superpowered healing and ability to anticipate an opponent's moves so quickly as to win any fight, as being the product of bioengineering commissioned by Bendix.

=== The Authority ===
Wedding of Midnighter and Apollo from the Transfer of Power graphic novel (2002).

In 1999 Warren Ellis concluded his run on Stormwatch with the Final Orbit storyline, which saw the team destroyed. Midnighter was one of several Stormwatch characters Ellis retained for his new Wildstorm title, The Authority. In it, Midnighter (along with Apollo) was recruited by Jenny Sparks for a new team, the Authority, under her leadership. The new series picked up themes Ellis had explored in Stormwatch, including the political potential of a team more powerful than world governments and the United Nations.

A formidable fighter with a sardonic attitude, Midnighter epitomised the new team's commitment to fighting for a finer world, including against vested interests and world governments. Midnighter and Apollo's relationship, though hinted in previous issues, was revealed in The Authority #8. Midnighter was the architect of the team's first significant victory, the defeat of autocratic dictator Kaizen Gamorra, which he achieved by dropping the 50-mile-long Carrier onto Gamorra's island base.

During the Transfer of Power storyline, Midnighter was the only Authority member to evade capture when the U.S. government had the team attacked and replaced with manipulable substitutes. Presumed dead, Midnighter had in fact escaped the Carrier with baby Jenny Quantum. He returned to overthrow the puppet team and rescue Apollo from imprisonment and abuse at the hands of their replacements. Shortly thereafter Midnighter and Apollo were married and adopted Jenny.

Midnighter had a central role in Ed Brubaker and Dustin Nguyen's Revolution maxiseries. A visitation, apparently from a future Apollo, convinced Midnighter that he was on the path to becoming a malign dictator. To avoid this fate, Midnighter quit the team, precipitating its break-up, and returned to life fighting solo on the streets. Raised alone by Apollo, Jenny exploited her powers to age herself to young adulthood and reformed the Authority. Having convinced Midnighter to rejoin the team, Jenny discovered he was being manipulated by a dimension-hopping Henry Bendix, hitherto assumed dead. Midnighter fought for Bendix before the Engineer was able to break the mind-control; Midnighter then killed Bendix by ripping out his spine.

=== Kev ===
Midnighter featured in the first three of Garth Ennis's Kev miniseries, featuring Kev Hawkins, a former SAS soldier. Kev was introduced in the semi-parody The Authority: Kev, in which he killed Midnighter, Apollo and the rest of the Authority, though the Carrier resurrected them. On their last meeting they took down MI5's Royal Oak project, an attempt to replicate Bendix's experiments. Kev later featured without the Authority in the final book of his series, A Man Called Kev.

=== Midnighter, Grifter and Midnighter, and World's End (2006-2011) ===
On 1 November 2006, an ongoing Midnighter solo series began, with an initial creative partnership of Garth Ennis and Chris Sprouse. The book was part of the 2006 "Worldstorm" soft reboot of the Wildstorm universe, which saw several books relaunched, but which faltered when flagship titles The Authority and WildC.A.T.S. suffered serious delays and were cancelled after two and one issues respectively. The series was originally intended as a six-issue miniseries but ran for 20 issues and was cancelled in June 2008.

"I think the Midnighter is very much his own man; his sexuality is just one part of that. Never mind the fact that he doesn't kill people, would Batman do the things we’ve seen the Midnighter do? Batman fights for the status quo, the Midnighter fights to make the world better. Simple as that".

— Garth Ennis on Midnighter being seen as "the gay Batman".

Midnighter idea came when Ennis was having a lunch with other WildStorm people. Beside his A Man Called Kev and Battler Britton vanity projects, Wildstorm editor Scott Dunbier asked Ennis to also do something a bit more commercial in return, so the writer suggested to "go straight for the jugular and give the best character they’ve got his own book", which in his opinion would be Midnighter. Ennis described the character as "utterly lethal and he tells it like it is. He's got a nice dark sense of humor, too". About Midnighter's sexuality, the writer stated that "his sexuality is not a complex issue: he likes screwing men. He likes screwing one man in particular – but that doesn't mean he wants to be around the guy 24/7, hence the solo book". At Midnighter presentation, Ennis said that he could do more than six issues, something that didn't happen, and would try to maintain it as a solo book, without "any major appearances by The Authority in general" ("superteam, yawn"), "Apollo in particular" ("boring blond twat") or crossovers ("They can get someone else in for that").

Keith Giffen became the ongoing writer for Midnighter's last ten issues after a request from Dunbier, since Giffen previously expressed desire to write The Authority. According to Giffen, the idea was to keep Midnighter's consistency in characterization while adding his own different feel to it. He said Midnighter was an interesting character to him because he "never quite understood his power": "The idea of somebody who faces you down, and two seconds after meeting you, knows how to defeat you? That's kind of intriguing. Just playing around with that will be interesting". The writer expressed similar feelings to Ennis about keeping Midnighter on his own and "pull him back from The Authority", saying that he didn't want "that kind of feel that Midnighter is an extension of The Authority book". Giffen also added that he wished "to keep [writing Midnighter] until they throw me off the book".

The first story arc saw Midnighter attacked and kidnapped by agents of a man named Paulus while passing through the Carrier's teleportation portal. Paulus told Midnighter that he had replaced Midnighter's secondary heart with a remote-detonated bomb, and challenged him on pain of death to assassinate Adolf Hitler. Time-travelling back to the First World War trenches, Midnighter encountered Hitler as a young corporal in the German army, but was apprehended by 'time police' officers from the 95th century before carrying out his mission. In his struggle to escape, he crashed the officers' time machine at the year 1945, shortly before Hitler's expected suicide. Eventually Midnighter allied himself with the police and returned to his own time, where he threatened to erase Paulus from history by killing his kidnapped younger self; he secured Paulus's surrender without having to kill the child. Midnighter then returned to the Carrier, but was apparently just as listless as before, immediately sending himself on another mission in Iraq.

This first arc was followed by four single-issue stories. Midnighter #6 featured an apparent alternate-universe Samurai Midnighter. Midnighter #7, by Brian K. Vaughan and Darick Robertson, explored the way Midnighter's brain processes combat by running the story backwards. Midnighter #8, by Christos Gage and John Paul Leon, dealt with Midnighter's attempts to connect better with humans after a graphic and public battle with the Suicide King.

A second story arc (issues #10–16), under new creative team Keith Giffen and Jon Landry (with ChrisCross pencilling later issues), detailed Midnighter's attempts to rediscover his life before becoming superhuman. Files given to him by Jenny Quantum identified him as Lucas Trent, born 14 July 1967 (making him 40 years old in 2007), a native of Harmony, Indiana. On visiting the town he found it was the hub of a paramilitary patriotic organisation named Anthem, with ambitions to take over the United States and provide the country with the conscience they felt it had lost. While battling Anthem and its superpowered operatives, including Dawn (a reference to the phrase "dawn's early light" in "The Star-Spangled Banner"), and Rosie (patterned after Rosie the Riveter), he discovered that Jenny had falsified the documents she gave him, and that he had never been Trent – but decided to stay on in Harmony nonetheless.

The final Midnighter storyline, again by Giffen, featured a Midnighter imposter attacking the Carrier and the Authority, and Midnighter's, fight to defeat him.

The 2007 mini-series, Grifter & Midnighter, united Grifter, of WildC.A.T.s, with Midnighter. The series was written by Chuck Dixon, with art by Ryan Benjamin and inking by Saleem Crawford.

The 2008 Number of the Beast Wildstorm limited series described the devastation of Earth, and set the scene for a new Authority ongoing series, by Dan Abnett and Andy Lanning, part of the World's End storyline. In this series Midnighter appears as one of the last Authority members still able to act in the ruins of London, now called Unlondon. Separated from Apollo, who is confined to the upper atmosphere by sunlight-blocking fog over the planet's surface, Midnighter helps civilians to reach the ruins of the Carrier, now a stronghold for survivors. Midnighter is able to contact Apollo via balloons which he releases high up in the atmosphere.

Following the resolution of the World's End storyline, the Authority's Carrier is called back to its creators. Jack Hawksmoor, Swift, and the Engineer go with it, but Midnighter remains on Earth to be with Apollo, who needs to be close to the sun.

=== The New 52: Stormwatch, Grayson and Midnighter (2011-2016) ===
In the autumn of 2011, DC relaunched its production with 52 new titles, including Stormwatch (written by Paul Cornell and drawn by Miguel Sepulveda). Cornell's Stormwatch #1 debuted a radically new version of the team, which lasted until spring 2013. Featuring longtime DC character Martian Manhunter and a number of new creations, Stormwatch was posited as a modern-day version of DC's Demon Knights, and Midnighter and Apollo were introduced at the start of their careers, unaware of one another's sexualities and their mutual attraction to one another. The first issue depicts the group's attempt at recruiting Midnighter and Apollo. Lucas Trent was presented for the first time as Midnighter's actual name and his costume was redesigned drastically. When Harry Tanner (who at the time was disguised as one of the Shadow Lords) framed Midnighter, he escaped, taking the Projectionist along with him. Eventually, when the team managed to capture him, Harry's ruse was revealed and Midnighter's innocence was proven. After the Engineer, who had been slowly losing her humanity, attacked them, Midnighter managed to escape with Apollo and with the help of his ally Zealot, attacked the base. After Jenny destroyed the base and killed the Engineer, the team mostly disassembled and Midnighter and Apollo realized that they had feelings for one another. For Jim Starlin's run on the title with issue #19, a time travel incident returned Midnighter and Apollo to their original designs and status as long-time lovers, before the New 52's status quo for the characters was restored in the final issue.

During the summer of 2014 he is regularly featured in the comic book series Grayson as he works to stop Spyral in collecting the body parts of a dead villain which endows those who have them the powers of the Justice League.

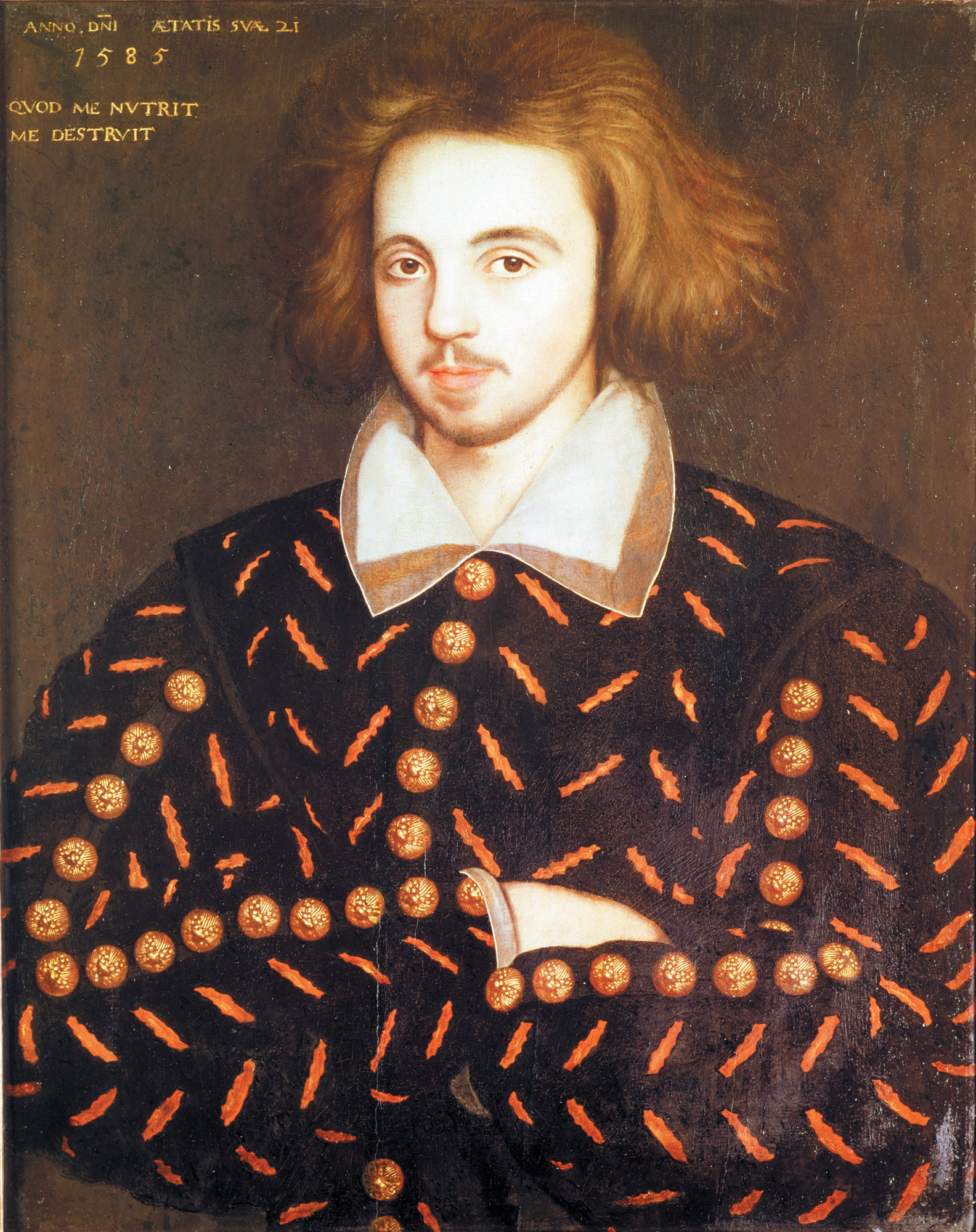
A portrait that purportedly displays Christopher Marlowe, described by Steve Orlando as a "writer, spy, queer man", and his main inspiration for Midnighter's characterization.

The character began appearing in his own ongoing series titled Midnighter, which began in June 2015 as part of "DC You" and was written by Steve Orlando. In it, Midnighter, having broken up with Apollo, has to come to terms with being newly single, as well as tracking down a thief who stole exotic technology from the God Garden and is openly selling it to different individuals. Amongst the items stolen are files containing the origin of who Midnighter really was before the Gardener abducted and created him, and Lucas Trent is revealed to be a fake identity. After teaming up with Spyral agent Dick Grayson to track down Russian vampire thrill-killers, Midnighter accompanies his new boyfriend to the latter's hometown to track down those who attacked his father and encounters the mastermind behind the theft of the God Garden technology – Prometheus.

Midnighter represented both a new path and a return to the character's roots. It re-established his over-the-top acts of graphic violence and focused on his community work with everyday people, a similar scenario to the character's early days in the WildStorm Universe before joining Stormwatch. This Midnighter, however, is considerably younger than his WildStorm counterpart, and desires to have a more social life. According to writer Orlando, he began writing Midnighter after Mark Doyle, Batman's editor, asked if he wanted to "pitch" any character. In an interview with Comic Vine, Orlando described Midnighter as:

...a fighter. That is a big part of where we’re going in this book. People talk about how he's the "anti-Batman". I think he's very different. [...] Midnighter doesn't brood. People think he's like another mopey vigilante. Really, Midnighter loves his job. It just happens that his job is horrifying. Everybody knows who he is and what he does but he has to really find out how to do anything. [...] Midnighter doesn't know if he likes bagels. He doesn't know if he likes going to the movies. He doesn't know if he likes any of those things because all he's ever done is fight. He can do that. He's the best at that but there has to be other things if he's going to be a real person.

The series had a close relationship with Grayson, a rebooted Dick Grayson solo comic. The characters Midnighter, Dick Grayson and Helena Bertinelli frequently feature in both comic books. Midnighter begins shortly after the end of his relationship with Andrew Pulaski, known as the hero Apollo. This decision, according to Orlando, was made to define Midnighter as a stand-alone character with his own sexual experiences with other people, while slowly building both characters' new interactions. The writer cites Christopher Marlowe, Orlando Cruz, Tab Hunter, John McClane, Emile Griffith, John Woo and Melvin Van Peebles as inspirations for the title character's personality.

=== DC Rebirth: Midnighter and Apollo (2016-2017) ===
The character appears again along with his former boyfriend, Apollo for a six-issue miniseries titled Midnighter and Apollo, continuing in the New 52 canon, where the two of them have gotten back together as a couple. Apollo is attacked and his soul trapped in a hell dimension, and Midnighter plans to rescue him. He learns by Extraño where Apollo is trapped. He then goes in search of the Ace of Winchesters, killing a demon called Vodyanar to get one bullet and then going into Hell to take the Ace from the Lords of the Gun.

Midnighter is also referenced in the newly renumbered Detective Comics as a Batman Family ally; it is mentioned that Nightwing reaches out to him to access Door technology. This implies that they have maintained their working relationship and friendship from Grayson and the DCYou Midnighter series.

=== Infinite Frontier ===
Following Infinite Frontier, Midnighter is recruited by an ageing Superman with weakening powers into a new incarnation of the Authority in the limited series Superman and the Authority.

== Powers and abilities ==
Midnighter's abilities are presented in the character's first appearance, occurring in Stormwatch (vol. 2 #4). Midnighter is the product of bioengineered enhancements commissioned by the character of Henry Bendix. It is implied (as in the Midnighter solo series (issues #10–16)) that Midnighter was a normal human before enlisting with Stormwatch Black. Several storylines have featured the deactivation, over-riding, or removal of the character's enhancements to reduce Midnighter's abilities to those of a normal man. The abortive Team Achilles series suggested that Bendix had "designed" Midnighter and Apollo during his childhood.

Typically, Midnighter is presented with superhuman strength, speed, reflexes and resilience. The character is shown moving faster than both the human and superhuman eye, and in possession of a healing factor that allows him to rapidly recover from injury and illness. Storylines have shown Midnighter surviving a broken neck, broken limbs, holes through his chest and burning; the character is also portrayed clearing "AIDS in six weeks". Midnighter is capable of surviving in anaerobic environments for short time periods and possesses a secondary replacement heart. He also has the power to suppress pain so he can keep fighting when pain would stop a normal person.

Many writers have referenced Midnighter's trademark ability to predict the unfolding of a battle before it starts. Early in Ellis's run on The Authority, the character was described as having a mental combat computer, with neural-inductive implants, which he uses to run through a given combat situation millions of times in his mind, almost instantly covering nearly every possible result before the first punch is even thrown. This allows for the perfect response and counterattack, such that if Midnighter can possibly win a battle, he will. Ellis portrayed the Midnighter delivering a monologue on this ability to intimidate opponents; Keith Giffen later had the character distribute a business card to this effect, to save time. Howard Link of Stormwatch describes such an ingenious ability design as neurotactical wetware. Issue #7 of the Midnighter solo series, written by Brian K. Vaughan, showed the character using this ability regressively, to visualize the desired outcome of a battle and work backwards logically to achieve it. The stand-alone Authority graphic novel Human on the Inside, by John Ridley, suggested the ability was reactive, and required an opponent to make a first move to define the possibilities for a response; however, this is contradicted by numerous earlier and later comics. Midnighter was also unable to use this ability against the Joker due to the latter's extreme insanity, implying that Midnighter's ability to predict attacks in opponents with unpredictable nature is useless. Also, his attack prediction abilities can be thrown off by enemies who are faster than him.

In The New 52, Midnighter's abilities are altered. His power to predict the outcome of any situation still exists, but appears to have been supplemented by a form of precognition as well as enhanced knowledge. He is able to finish other people's sentences before they have thought about it, and when Stormwatch's map of alien threats to Earth materialised in front of him and Apollo, he instantly knew what it was. He has significant resistance to telepathic attacks, as he was able to resist the Scourge of Worlds' attempt to use Martian Manhunter's telepathy on him. He mentions that he has carbon-fibre muscles that presumably enhance his strength. Harry Tanner, reputed to be the world's greatest swordsman, struggled to land even a single blow on Midnighter since the latter could predict every move he would make. After a few seconds of fighting, Midnighter immediately knew what Harry's power was. Midnighter has demonstrated the ability to move so stealthily that the Manhunter and Hawksmoor could not hear or sense his stalking until it was too late. Midnighter's suit enhances his durability; he was able to survive unaided in hyperspace for a while.

== Alternate versions ==
- In Wildstorm Winter Special 2005, a story called Apollo & Midnighter: Two Dangerous Ideas features their alternate reality analogues, Pluto and Daylighter, respectively, with inverted color schemes to match. At first the real Apollo and Midnighter believed that they were their homophobic counterparts, but later learned that they were a former couple and had broken up.
- Issue #6 of Midnighter's solo series starred a nameless, super-skilled swordsman from feudal Japan who fell in love with a peace-seeking Chinese warrior much like Apollo. This swordsman had powers similar to Midnighter's future-sight and super-strength.
- A teenage Midnighter called Daybreaker appears in Gen^{13} (volume 4) #11 as a member of the "Authori-teens" and is implied to have feelings for teammate Kid Apollo.
- An alternate version of Midnighter appeared in the "Ruling the World" Authority/Planetary crossover.

== Reception ==
In 2013, ComicsAlliance ranked Midnighter as #17 on their list of the "50 Sexiest Male Characters in Comics". In 2015, IGN listed Midnighter (along with Apollo) on their list of "18 Awesome LGBT Characters".

== Collected editions ==
Title	Material collected	Published date	ISBN
Grifter/Midnighter	Grifter/Midnighter #1-6	January 2008	978-1845767297
Midnighter Vol. 1: Killing Machine	Midnighter (vol. 1) #1–6	November 2007	978-1845766337
Midnighter Vol. 2: Anthem	Midnighter (vol. 1) #7, 10-15	August 2008	978-1845767358
Midnighter Vol. 3: Assassin8	Midnighter (vol. 1) #16-20	January 2009	978-1848560932
Midnighter: The Complete Wildstorm Series	Midnighter (vol. 1) #1-20, Midnighter: Armageddon #1	July 2017	978-1401267919
Midnighter Vol. 1: Out	Midnighter (vol. 2) #1-7	February 2016	978-1401259785
Midnighter Vol. 2: Hard	Midnighter (vol. 2) #8-12	October 2016	978-1401264932
Midnighter and Apollo	Midnighter and Apollo #1-6	July 2017	978-1401272012
Midnighter: The Complete Collection	DC Sneak Peek: Midnighter #1, Midnighter (vol. 2) #1-12, Midnighter and Apollo #1-6	June 2022	978-1779515391

== See also ==
- LGBT themes in comics
