= Swift (character) =

Publication information
- Publisher: Wildstorm (DC Comics)
- First appearance: Stormwatch #28 (September 1995)
- Created by: Jeff Mariotte; Ron Lim

In-story information
- Alter ego: Shen Li-Min
- Team affiliations: The Authority; Stormwatch
- Abilities: High-speed flight Talons

Swift (Shen Li-Min) is a superhero in the Wildstorm universe published by DC Comics. Swift first appeared in Stormwatch #28 and was created by Jeff Mariotte and Ron Lim. She is currently a member of The Authority.

== Fictional character biography ==
Shen Li-Min is a Seedling, a type of superhuman whose abilities were activated after a comet passed by Earth. She is brought into Stormwatch as a rookie codenamed Swift, with her powers only partially activated. Henry Bendix later reconfigures Stormwatch and assigns Swift to the black ops team Stormwatch Black alongside Jenny Sparks, with whom she has a brief romance. Christine Trelane activates Swift's powers, bringing out their full potential. After Stormwatch disbands, Swift joins her former teammates in the Authority. Formerly a pacifist, she puts aside her beliefs to fight for a better world regardless of the cost.

=== World's End ===
The 2008 Number of the Beast miniseries sees the devastation of Earth and set the scene for a new Authority ongoing series, World's End, by Dan Abnett and Andy Lanning. In this series, Swift acts as a messenger for the Authority, using her powers and a code of colored balloons as a communications channel. She finds herself followed at all times by a flock of birds confused by the new, harsher, environment. Swift works closely with Stormwatch, as the need to help civilians has made their grudges irrelevant.

=== As the new Doctor ===
Swift is one of the few heroes, along with the Authority, to leave Earth on the Carrier after its sudden departure for an unknown destination in the universe. Eventually, the Carrier and its passengers are captured by the Karibna, a malevolent alien species. Prior to the Carrier's capture, Swift is rendered comatose after combating a mind-controlled Aegean and is kept at the medical ward. Unlike the other human passengers who were captured by the Karibna, Swift's body remains hidden due to an unknown power that is keeping her invisible. When the Authority defeat the Karibna and return to Earth, Swift is chosen as Earth's new Doctor as she possesses a connection to the planet's ecosystem.

== Powers and abilities ==
When her powers were only partially activated, Swift had a line of feathers that ran along the underside of her arms, allowing for limited flight. After being fully activated by Christine Trelane, she gained retractable wings and claws. She has flown fast enough to catch super-speedsters. Enhanced strength and durability are shown, including an incident where Swift flew straight through a person, causing them to explode. She has some birdlike enhanced senses; apart from superior hearing and eyesight, she is able to feel or "read" the air to locate moving things. Swift is the navigator for The Carrier, the sentient spaceship that is headquarters for the Authority.

As the new Doctor, she can alter reality as she imagines it.
