= Jenny Sparks =

- Cover of Jenny Sparks: The Secret History of the Authority issue #1

Publication information
- Publisher: WildStorm (DC Comics)
- First appearance: Stormwatch vol. 1 #37 (July 1996)
- Created by: Warren Ellis; Tom Raney

In-story information
- Species: Metahuman
- Team affiliations: The Authority; Stormwatch; British Space Program
- Notable aliases: The Spirit of the 20th Century
- Abilities: Control over electricity Ability to transform herself into electricity Decelerated aging

Jennifer Mary Sparks is a superhero in the WildStorm comic book universe created by Warren Ellis during his 1997 revamp of the Stormwatch series. Her first appearance was in issue #37 (Ellis' starting issue) where she was appointed the leader of Stormwatch Black (Black Ops division), with Swift and Jack Hawksmoor, with whom she would later create The Authority.

Sparks is described as "The Spirit of the 20th Century", having been born at its beginning and later dying at its end. Throughout her time, she is shown to have influenced many of the most significant individuals who shaped that century, both positively and negatively. Sparks is depicted as a superficial hedonist hiding a strong underlying sense of morality. She was named the 44th Greatest Comic Book Character by Empire in 2006. In August 2024, DC Comics revived Sparks as a DC Universe character in a 21st-century setting for an eponymous DC Black Label mini-series written by Tom King.

== Publication history ==
Jenny Sparks first appeared in Stormwatch vol. 2 #37 (July 1996), created by writer Warren Ellis and artist Tom Raney. After that series concluded with the deaths of most characters not introduced by Ellis, he launched The Authority, with Sparks as its leader.

Following issue #12, Ellis left the title and Mark Millar became writer. Millar expanded Sparks' backstory in the Jenny Sparks: The Secret History of the Authority limited series, integrating her into key 20th-century events and figures such as Albert Einstein, Ernest Hemingway, Adolf Hitler, Jacques Cousteau, John Lennon, and Princess Diana, among others.

In 2011, DC's New 52 line relaunched Stormwatch under writer Paul Cornell and artist Miguel Sepulveda. This twelve-issue run reintroduced Jenny Sparks alongside a revised team roster.

In 2017, Ellis returned to WildStorm properties with The Wild Storm, co-written with Jason Howard and illustrated by Jon Davis-Hunt. This series retained Sparks's role as the Spirit of the Century while relocating her origin to a continuity adjacent to DC's main line.

In 2024, as part of the DC All In initiative, DC Black Label published a new Jenny Sparks solo series by Tom King and Jeff Spokes. The series presents her as the Spirit of the 20th Century and former member of Stormwatch and the Authority, maintaining her established WildStorm backstory with minor updates.

== Fictional character biography ==
Jennifer Sparks was born in England on 1 January 1900. Her family possessed quite a fortune, and she was sent to an all-girls school in Vienna. Her family had died on the Titanic in 1912, and her father's nemesis took over their fortune. Left penniless, young Jenny was invited by her godfather, Albert Einstein, to Zürich, where he offered to finish her education. Before leaving she recommended that a young painter, whose art was quite abysmal, leave it behind and take a career in politics as he had a certain charisma and talent for speeches.

Between 1913 and 1919, her powers started to manifest. Jenny Sparks had absolute control of electricity, including travel through power lines, shooting bolts of lightning and shaping electricity. With age, her control and power increased. By 1919, Jenny stopped aging.

In various comics, a number of Sparks' adventures through the early and middle part of the 20th century have been told. A common theme in these stories is her interaction with prominent historical figures.

In the 1960s through 1980s, Sparks is shown to have become involved with the first British bands of superheroes, but she encounters problems with some extreme personalities that disillusioned her to that role.

=== Stormwatch and The Authority ===
Despite those experiences, in the 1990s she agreed to join a new group called Stormwatch that had been formed by a man named Henry Bendix.

Against her wishes, she was given command of a covert team called Stormwatch Black.

When Stormwatch disbanded after the Xenomorph attack that took the lives of half the team, she created a new superhero group called The Authority alongside a number of Stormwatch Black teammates. During her leadership, Jenny and her team faced many threats, including super-powered terrorists and an invasion by an alternate reality.

On 31 December 1999, Jenny Sparks knew that she would die at midnight as the 20th century ended, a fact known only by her teammate The Doctor. She electrocuted the brain of an enormous alien creature, the "God" that had originally created Earth and which was planning to wipe the planet clean of all life. This was her final act, in her words, as humanity's defense mechanism. She died moments later in her teammates' arms. Her dying words and last will were: "Save the world. They deserve it. Be better. Or I'll come back and kick your heads in."

The passing of "The Spirit of the 20th Century" heralded the arrival of a successor. At the moment Jenny Sparks died, a new entity was born: Jenny Quantum, "Spirit of the 21st Century".

During the Transfer of Power storyline, a magical version of Jenny appeared and temporarily removed all mechanical weapons from the earth.

=== The New 52 ===
In the DC Comics' rebooted Stormwatch series, part of their New 52 event, Jenny's shirt was seen in storage in Stormwatch's base. Jenny Sparks herself also makes an appearance in a flashback montage, projected by Adam One, in Stormwatch's "0" edition.

=== The Wild Storm ===
In Warren Ellis' 2017 reboot of the WildStorm properties following DC Rebirth, Jenny Sparks is reinterpreted as an aspect of a "Planetary defense system" created by aliens, complete with new powers. She is also of Asian descent, with her name being Jenny Mei Sparks, and is almost 120 years old. She is a techne – a spirit of the mechanical arts and crafts, empowered by the defining technology of her era, and created by unknown powers to defend the planet Earth.

=== DC All In ===
In 2021, DC established with its Infinite Frontier soft reboot that "everything is canon", extending the editorial mandate from DC Rebirth to restore characters to their traditional, most iconic depictions. This continued with DC All In, which restored Jenny Sparks to her original Wildstorm look and characterization. Jenny starred in a 2024 solo series by Tom King and Jeff Spokes, which was published under the DC Black Label imprint.

In her new backstory as part of the DC Universe, Jenny is the great-granddaughter of Charles Darwin and goddaughter of Albert Einstein. She died in 1999 and was buried in Westminster Abbey, with Jenny Quantum succeeding her as a Century Baby. However, Jenny Sparks was resurrected on September 11, 2001, as the problems of the 20th century did not end. Batman and Superman recruit her to be superhero "internal affairs," investigating and potentially even killing ones that step out of line if need be. The series shows Jenny trying to stop an out-of-control Captain Atom with methods that differ from the Justice League's use of force.

== Powers and abilities ==
Jenny Sparks is one of the Century Babies, a being produced by the multiverse for a specific task. In her case, this is to influence the 20th century. As such, her moods are tied directly to the world's status. For example, she was suicidally depressed during the Great Depression and deliriously high during the Roaring Twenties. Additionally, she stopped aging at nineteen and remained this way until her death. Her appearance alters from time to time and it is unclear if this is an effect of her connection to the planet or artistic interpretation.

Jenny has the ability to manipulate electricity. She can easily draw electricity from electronic devices as well as from the human brain, a move she has threatened to kill people with. Sparks can also convert her entire body into electricity and travel anywhere electricity would. She can apparently survive being transformed into other forms of energy, as when she travelled through a TV and power lines and then into a police radio. Shifting into her electrical form heals Sparks from injuries as well as poisons. Like an electric current, Sparks as electricity must go somewhere before she can re-emerge in her human form. Normally this is into a machine, but other conductors seem to work as well. She was once able to go into the sky and remain there until striking down as lightning. She can also enter a person briefly and electrocute them.

A key distinction is that Jenny Sparks does not generate electricity like Electro and others. If she is unable to access electricity from any sources or has no place for her electrical form to go, she is powerless and as vulnerable as a normal human. This limitation is woven into the plotlines of many of her adventures.

Through her lifetime, Sparks was a member of several branches of the British military and led various superhero teams. As such, she is an experienced leader and knowledgeable about military protocol. She has not demonstrated the fighting skill that one might associate with this experience, usually relying on her powers instead.

A short-lived 2017 reboot of Jenny Sparks in The Wild Storm possessed the ability to travel between electronic devices, such as televisions, computers and smartphones.

== Collected editions ==
Her appearances have been collected in trade paperbacks, including:

- Jenny Sparks: The Secret History of the Authority (ISBN 1-56389-769-5)
- Jenny Sparks: Be Better (ISBN 978-1799501534)
