= The Authority (comics) =

DC Comics comic book series

- The Authority, as featured on the cover for the Under New Management trade paperback (Nov. 2000). From left to right, the Doctor, Swift, Apollo, Jenny Sparks, Midnighter, the Engineer, and Jack Hawksmoor, with the infant Jenny Quantum at the back. Art by Frank Quitely.

Group publication information
- Publisher: WildStorm (Image Comics; after 1998: DC Comics)
- First appearance: The Authority (vol. 1) #1 (May 1999)
- Created by: Warren Ellis; Bryan Hitch

In-story information
- Base(s): The Carrier
- Agent(s): Christine Trelane; Deathblow; Engineer; Flint; Freefall; Grifter; The High; Jack Hawksmoor; Rainmaker; Swift; Manchester Black; Former members: Apollo; Doctor (Jeroen Thornedike); Doctor (Habib ben Hassan); Jenny Quantum; Jenny Sparks; Midnighter; Rose Tattoo

The Authority (comics)

Series publication information
- Format: Ongoing series
- Genre: Superhero
- Publication date: (Vol. 1); May 1999 – July 2002 (Vol. 2); July 2003 – November 2004 (Revolution); December 2004 – December 2005 (Vol. 3: The Lost Year); December 2006 – October 2010 (Vol. 4); October 2008 – December 2010
- Number of issues: (Vol. 1): 29 (Vol. 2): 15 (Revolution): 12 (Vol. 3)/The Lost Year: 12 (Vol. 4): 29

Creative team
- Creator(s): Warren Ellis; Bryan Hitch

The Authority is an American superhero comic book series published by DC Comics under the Wildstorm imprint. It was created in 1999 by Warren Ellis and Bryan Hitch, and follows the adventures of the Authority, a superhero team mainly composed of Ellis-created characters from Stormwatch.

The team appear in various media set in the DC Universe (DCU) media franchise. Angela Spica / Engineer appears in the film Superman (2025), portrayed by María Gabriela de Faría.

== Publication history ==
=== Volume 1 ===
==== Ellis/Hitch run ====
The cover of the cancelled Authority: Widescreen by Bryan Hitch

In 1999, Warren Ellis and Bryan Hitch created the Authority, a team of superheroes who got the job done by any means necessary. The original line-up consisted of Jenny Sparks, a British woman who could generate and turn into electricity; Jack Hawksmoor, who was psychically bonded to cities in order to communicate with them and receive powers from them; Swift, a Tibetan woman who possessed wings and sharp talons; Apollo, a bio-engineered Superman pastiche; Midnighter, a bio-engineered Batman pastiche who possessed the ability to foresee his opponents' moves in combat; The Engineer, a scientist who had replaced her blood with nine pints of nanotechnology and could create solid objects with it; and The Doctor, a Dutch drug addict and shaman who possessed the combined powers of the hundreds of shamans who came before him. On the creation of the series, Ellis noted:

"One of the reasons I turned their Stormwatch into The Authority is that I found out that, despite the fact that no-one was buying Stormwatch, they kept it going because they liked reading it in the [Wildstorm] office and wanted to keep me employed. And I felt so bloody awful about that, and at the same time had been so struck by Bryan Hitch’s Stormwatch issues, that the train of thought that led to The Authority began."

The Ellis/Hitch run of The Authority lasted 12 issues, divided into three four-issue story arcs: The Circle, Shiftships, and Outer Dark. Outer Dark ended with team leader Jenny Sparks, thought to be the Spirit of the 20th Century, dying in the final minutes of December 31, 1999, as the 20th Century ended and the 21st began.

==== Millar/Quitely run ====
Replacing Ellis and Hitch after issue #12 were writer Mark Millar and artist Frank Quitely. Tom Peyer and Dustin Nguyen worked on a four-issue fill-in arc, and Arthur Adams drew two of the final three issues of Millar's run and Gary Erskine drew the final issue, #29.

During the Millar/Quitely run, the Authority was now under Jack Hawksmoor's leadership following Jenny Sparks' death at the end of the 20th century. They faced multiple foes such as a mad scientist and his army of superhumans who wanted to influence the 21st Century through Jenny Sparks' successor Jenny Quantum, a previous Doctor who manipulated the Earth itself, and a duplicate team of superheroes modeled on the Authority that was created and backed by the G7 group of nations. Also during the run, Jenny Quantum was adopted by Apollo and Midnighter after they were married and the Doctor worked through his heroin addiction after faltering in battle.

A number of panels and covers during the Millar/Quitely run, which was published in the aftermath of the September 11 attacks, were censored by DC Comics. During Millar and Quitely's first arc, red filters were used to obscure particularly violent panels. DC also ordered a scene in which Apollo and Midnighter kiss be completely removed, and a character based on Marvel Comics' Captain America be redesigned, subsequently re-drawn and recolored on the cover to issue #14 to differentiate between the two. DC would order Adams' work on the final issues of the volume be substantially re-drawn, the more significant examples being a scene depicting leader of the G7 Authority, The Colonel, about to perform a sexual act on Jenny Sparks' severely-decomposed corpse that was re-drawn and Millar's dialogue was re-written to remove any depiction or mention of necrophilia; a panel in which G7 Authority member Teuton kills multiple people by flying through them, that was re-drawn as two separate and less graphic panels; multiple panels in which Teuton gropes Apollo against his will and is then killed in a particularly gory fashion, which were re-drawn so as not to show the groping and to make Teuton's death scene less explicit; a series of panels depicting Swift being humiliated, which had sexual overtones, and was re-drawn so as to soften the scene; and a panel in which George W. Bush was depicted that was re-drawn so the character who appears as the President of the United States would not resemble Bush.

Cover to The Authority #29 (July 2002) by Arthur Adams

=== Volume 2 ===
The series was subsequently restarted, (with a planned "Mature Readers" relaunch by Brian Azzarello and Glenn Fabry being scrapped in the wake of 9/11), and was written by Robbie Morrison with art by Dwayne Turner (except for the single issue "Behemoth", which featured art by Tan Eng Huat, and "Street Life", which was penciled by Whilce Portacio). This incarnation of the series lasted for 15 issues, including issues 1–14 and the series of back-ups that ran through Stormwatch: Team Achilles #9, Sleeper #3 and Wildcats v3.0 #8 which were eventually published as issue 0. Prior to issue 10, the series was part of the "Coup d'état" crossover that included The Authority, Stormwatch: Team Achilles, Sleeper, and Wildcats v3.0. The crossover revolved around the Authority taking over the United States of America.

=== Revolution ===
The series was again restarted in October 2004 as The Authority: Revolution, a twelve issue mini-series written by Ed Brubaker and drawn by Dustin Nguyen and Richard Friend that focused on the troubles the Authority faced as the rulers of America.

=== Volume 3 ===
==== Morrison/Ha run ====
In February 2006, it was announced that Grant Morrison would write The Authority Volume 3, with art by Gene Ha. The series was intended to be published bimonthly, beginning in October 2006. Morrison "cited Warren Ellis’s original run as an approach they wanted to return to, saying their new approach will allow the team to be effectual again".

Morrison and Ha's first issue was released in December 2006. It followed a family man named Ken in his search for a downed submarine that encountered something massive and unexpected in the depths of the ocean that caused it to be destroyed. When Ken finds the ship, many of the crew are missing. The issue ends as Ken and his search party encounters the Authority's Carrier, 50 miles long, lying on the ocean floor.

The second issue came out five months after the first and dealt with the Authority's reaction to crash-landing on a less developed Earth than theirs. Ken meets The Authority but begins to question their methodology.

In September 2007, Gene Ha was quoted at Newsarama as saying that he did not believe his run with Morrison would continue. "...I don't think The Authority #3 by Grant Morrison and Gene Ha is ever coming out. Grant is busy redesigning the DC Universe and I've moved onto new projects. Most importantly, it seems that editor Scott Dunbier has been forced out of Wildstorm. There is no #3 script, there may never be a #3 script."

Scott Peterson announced at Wondercon 2008 that he had talked to Morrison two weeks earlier about The Authority, and there was "very serious progress" and it would start shipping again toward the end of the year. When asked to comment upon their inability to complete further issues of The Authority, Morrison has said '"Authority was just a disaster." They said that they were doing it and running late when 52 started, but when they saw the reviews to the first issue, "I said fuck it."'

==== The Lost Year ====
On 19 April 2008, Wildstorm announced Keith Giffen would complete Grant Morrison's scripts. Giffen ran into an immediate problem: "I stepped into a book that was in the midst of a type of storyline that is probably my least favorite in comics. And that is, heroes come to our earth". However, according to Giffen, this was only the first short arc of the longer story:

The story that Grant started wraps up in two more issues, then it moves into another adventure. This book is about the Authority having trouble with the Carrier and they're trying to find their way home. It's almost like the Odyssey, in a way, as trying to find your way home and going through various adventures. And this is what Grant had planned. This is in keeping with the basic structure that he told me over the phone. But then, I'll put in my point of view.

The remaining issues of volume 3 were published by Wildstorm under the title The Authority: The Lost Year. Giffen was credited alongside Morrison as the writer, with several artists contributing. Eventually, J. M. DeMatteis joined the creative team for a few issues as co-writer. The series ran a total of twelve issues, including the original two by Morrison.

=== Prime ===
In July 2007, it was announced that Christos Gage and Darick Robertson would do an intended story arc as a miniseries due to the scheduling problems with the Morrison/Ha run on the title. The resulting six-issue miniseries entitled The Authority: Prime was planned to have spanned issues #6 to #11 of The Authority (vol. 3). It featured the renewed Stormwatch Prime who, along with the Authority, investigate a recently discovered secret bunker that once belonged to Henry Bendix.

=== Volume 4 ===
==== Abnett/Lanning/Coleby era ====
Dan Abnett and Andy Lanning relaunched the book in May 2008 in the wake of the World's End event and took over the writing duties, accompanied by artist Simon Coleby, writing the first seventeen issues of the series. Senior Wildstorm editor Ben Abernathy also said of four issues that had already been completed by the new team, "I can say honestly, based on the four issues of script and art that are already in the can, people will NOT be disappointed!"

Abnett and Lanning's contract with Marvel Comics included a clause which allowed them to finish their existing projects, including their run on The Authority.

==== Bernardin/Freeman/Barrionuevo era ====
Writers Marc Bernardin & Adam Freeman and artist Al Barrionuevo worked on the book for a four-issue run from #18 to #21, including the epilogue in issue 17.

==== Taylor/Barrionuevo era ====
Writer Tom Taylor (writer of several Star Wars titles including the Star Wars: Invasion series) took over The Authority with issue #22, (with artist Mike S. Miller filling in for two issues for Al Barrinuevo), until the series concluded with #29.

=== Superman and the Authority ===
After Wildstorm was eventually merged with DC's mainline universe, the Authority would be reintroduced during the Infinite Frontier era, in a short miniseries known as Superman and the Authority, by Grant Morrison and Mikel Janen. In this miniseries, Superman and Manchester Black (whose previous team the Elite was a reference to the Authority) assemble a new incarnation of the Authority to liberate Warworld from Mongul.

== Members ==
The founding members of the Authority were:

- Jenny Sparks, "The Spirit of the Twentieth Century"; the group's founder and original leader.
- Apollo, "The Sun God".
- Midnighter a.k.a. Lucas Trent, "Night's Bringer of War".
- The Doctor a.k.a. Jeroen Thornedike, "The Shaman".
- The second Engineer a.k.a. Angela Spica, "The Maker".
- Jack Hawksmoor, "The God of Cities"; leader of the Authority from 2000 to 2005, and again from 2008 to 2010.
- Swift a.k.a. Shen Li-Min, "The Winged Huntress".

Following the Outer Dark story arc, Jenny Sparks was replaced with:

- Jenny Quantum, "The Spirit of the 21st Century"; leader of the Authority from 2005 to 2008.

At the end of the Revolution maxi-series, the Authority gained two new members:

- The Doctor a.k.a. Habib ben Hassan, "The Shaman"; Thornedike's successor and
- Rose Tattoo, "The Spirit of Life"; formerly "The Spirit of Murder", the personification of the act of murder, and seemingly capable of killing anyone; member of Stormwatch.

Beginning with #18 of volume four the team roster underwent a major change. Jack Hawksmoor, Swift and Engineer remained on the team, where they were joined by new members:

- Synergy a.k.a. Christine Trelane; formerly Stormwatch's activator, capable of activating or temporarily removing Seedlings' powers; their second Weatherman until Henry Bendix's return; and second-in-command under Jackson King.
- Deathblow a.k.a. Michael Cray; former member of Team 7.
- Flint a.k.a. Victoria Ngengi; former member of Stormwatch.
- Freefall a.k.a. Roxanne Spaulding; former member of Gen¹³.
- Grifter a.k.a. Cole Cash; former member of the Wildcats and Team 7.
- The High a.k.a. John Cumberland; one of the first super-heroes active in America during the 1930s and '40s, long thought to be an urban legend, and former member of the radical super-human group The Changers.
- Rainmaker a.k.a. Sarah Rainmaker; former member of Gen 13.

The Authority's base of operations is the Carrier, a sentient, gigantic, interdimensional "shiftship" existing everywhere on Earth at the same time and capable of moving through every imaginable plane of existence.

When the Authority was assembled in the Superman and the Authority series, the group would operate out of the Fortress of Solitude, where the artificial intelligence Kelex could aid them. In addition to Apollo and Midnighter, several characters created for DC comics would become members of this version of the team. These members were:

- Superman, one of Earth's leading heroes, the owner of the Fortress of Solitude, one of the survivors of the destruction of Krypton, and the team's new founder.
- Manchester Black, a former enemy of Superman and leader of the Elite who possesses telepathic powers.
- Steel, an ally of Superman who wields a chrome suit of armor and a hammer, filling a similar role to the Engineer.
- Enchantress, a sorceress who was a former member of Justice League Dark and the Suicide Squad, filling a similar role to the Doctor.
- Lightray, a being from Earth 9 who derives fast speeds from the ability to control light, filling similar roles to Jenny Sparks and Swift.
- The second OMAC from Earth 9, Lightray's crime-fighting partner who derives super strength from powered armor.

== Awards ==
The series was nominated for "Outstanding Comic Book" in the 14th and 15th GLAAD Media Awards.

== Collected editions ==
Title	Material collected	Published date	ISBN
Volume 1
The Authority: Relentless	The Authority (vol. 1) #1-8	June 2000	978-1840231946
The Authority: Under New Management	The Authority (vol. 1) #9-16	March 2001	978-1840232769
The Authority: Earth Inferno and Other Stories	The Authority (vol. 1) #17–20, The Authority Annual 2000 #1 and material from Wildstorm Summer Special #1	September 2002	978-1840233711
The Monarchy: Bullets Over Babylon	The Authority (vol. 1) #21 and The Monarchy #1-4	December 2001	978-1563898594
The Authority: Transfer of Power	The Authority (vol. 1) #22-29	October 2002	978-1401200206
The Authority Vol. 1	The Authority (vol. 1) #1-12	May 2013	978-1401240301
The Authority Vol. 2	The Authority (vol. 1) #13-29, The Authority Annual 2000 #1, and material from WildStorm Summer Special #1	December 2013	978-1401250805
Absolute The Authority Vol. 1 (first edition)	The Authority (vol. 1) #1-12	August 2002	978-1563898822
Absolute The Authority Vol. 2 (first edition)	The Authority (vol. 1) #13–20, 22, 27–29	February 2004	978-1401200978
Absolute Authority Vol. 1 (second edition)	The Authority (vol. 1) #1-12, Planetary/The Authority: Rule the World #1 and material from Wildstorm: A Celebration of 25 Years	October 2017	978-1401276478
Absolute Authority Vol. 2 (second edition)	The Authority (vol. 1) #13-29, The Authority Annual 2000 #1 and material from Wildstorm Summer Special #1	July 2018	978-1401281151
The Authority Omnibus	The Authority (vol. 1) #1-29, Planetary/The Authority: Rule the World #1, Jenny Sparks: The Secret History of the Authority #1-5, Authority Annual 2000 #1 and material from Wildstorm Summer Special	August 2019	978-1401292317
The Authority Omnibus (2025 Edition)	The Authority (vol. 1) #1-29, Planetary/The Authority: Rule the World #1, Authority Annual 2000 #1, Jenny Sparks: The Secret History of the Authority #1-5, and material from Wildstorm Summer Special and WildStorm: A Celebration of 25 Years	July 1, 2025	978-1799502036
Volume 2
The Authority: Harsh Realities	The Authority (vol. 2) #0-5	April 2004	978-1401202781
The Authority: Fractured Worlds	The Authority (vol. 2) #6-14	January 2005	978-1401203009
Revolution
The Authority: Revolution Book One	The Authority: Revolution #1-6	August 2005	978-1845761776
The Authority: Revolution Book Two	The Authority: Revolution #7-12	April 2006	978-1845762513
The Authority by Ed Brubaker & Dustin Nguyen	The Authority: Revolution #1-12	March 2019	978-1401288426
Volume 3
The Authority: The Lost Year Vol. 1	The Authority (vol. 3) #1-6	June 2010	978-1401227494
The Authority: The Lost Year Vol. 2	The Authority (vol. 3) #7-12	January 2011	978-1401229856
Volume 4
The Authority: World's End	The Authority (vol. 4) #1-7	September 2009	978-1401223625
The Authority: Rule Britannia	The Authority (vol. 4) #8-17	March 2010	978-1401226671
Miniseries
Jenny Sparks: The Secret History of the Authority	Jenny Sparks: The Secret History of the Authority #1-5	May 2001	978-1563897696
Coup d'État	Coup d'État: The Authority #1, Coup d'État: Sleeper #1, Coup d'État: Stormwatch: Team Achilles #1, Coup d'État: WildCATS #1, Coup d'État: Afterword #1	October 2004	978-1401205706
The Authority: Human on the Inside	Original graphic novel	October 2004	978-1401200701
The Authority: Kev	The Authority: Kev #1, The Authority: More Kev #1-4	May 2005	978-1401206147
The Authority: The Magnificent Kevin	The Authority: The Magnificent Kevin #1-5	May 2006	978-1401209902
The Authority / Lobo: Holiday Hell	The Authority/Lobo: Jingle Hell #1, The Authority/Lobo: Spring Break Massacre #1, The Lobo Paramilitary Christmas Special #1 and material from Wildstorm Winter Special #1	August 2006	978-1401209926
The Authority: A Man Called Kev	A Man Called Kev #1-5	June 2007	978-1401213244
The Authority: Prime	The Authority: Prime #1-6	August 2008	978-1401218348
The Secret History of the Authority: Hawksmoor	The Secret History of the Authority: Hawksmoor #1-6	April 2009	978-1848561861
Superman and The Authority	Superman and The Authority #1-4	November 2021	978-1779513618

== In other media ==
- The Authority appear in films set in the DC Universe (DCU):
  - Angela Spica / Engineer appears in Superman (2025), portrayed by María Gabriela de Faría. This version is a metahuman, who works for Lex Luthor with whom she worked to assassinate Superman, considering him a threat to Earth.She helped Luthor infiltrate the Fortress of Solitude, where they obtained a message from Jor-El and Lara Lor-Van to reveal Superman's mission to dominate humanity, allowing Spica and her allies to temporarily trap their enemy in a pocket universe. When Superman escaped and set out to stop the black hole opened by LuthorCorp, Spica and Ultraman confronted him, although she was ultimately defeated by Superman.
  - Angela Spica / Engineer will appear in Man of Tomorrow (2027).
  - The Authority was planned to appear in a self-titled film, but it was not in active development by April 2026.

== See also ==
- Nextwave
