= Crusaders (DC Comics) =

Team of DC Comics superheroes

- The DC Comics version of the Crusaders, art by Dick Ayers

Publication information
- Publisher: DC Comics
- First appearance: Freedom Fighters #7 (March 1977)
- Created by: Bob Rozakis (writer); Dick Ayers (artist)

In-story information
- Member(s): The Americommando; Rusty; Barracuda; Fireball; Sparky

The Crusaders is a team of DC Comics super-heroes. The team was created by Bob Rozakis and Dick Ayers in the pages of Freedom Fighters #7 (March 1977).

They were based on the Invaders and part of an unofficial crossover.

== Fictional team history ==
The Crusaders first appeared on Earth-One during World War II. In the 1970s, they offer their services to New York City District Attorney David Pearson to help capture the Freedom Fighters, who were at that time fugitives because they were believed to have been working with the villain the Silver Ghost. Pearson gives the Crusaders the authority to pursue Uncle Sam and his group after a report that they had caused a blackout in upstate New York.

After a long fight, at the end of which the Crusaders are defeated, the Freedom Fighters ask the Crusaders how they became the comic book heroes of World War II. The group reveals that the Americommando had approached four young comic book fans at a comic book convention (Marvin, Lennie, Arch, and Roy) and offered to re-create them as his former teammates, using a special device to transform them into their super-powered identities.

The others catch up to the Americommando and Martha Roberts, rescuing Martha. The Ray burns off the Americommando's mask, revealing him to actually be the Silver Ghost in disguise. The fight attracts the attention of some State Trooper helicopters, who arrive to arrest them both. The Ray accidentally hits one of the helicopters with an energy blast, prompting the Troopers to open fire. The Ray is wounded and fell to Earth, then the Silver Ghost gloats and leaves him to die. The Ray is later rescued by Rod Reilly, the Golden Age Firebrand, who had emigrated to Earth-One sometime before the Freedom Fighters did.

The Americommando and Barracuda appear in the 2006–2007 miniseries Uncle Sam and the Freedom Fighters #1–8 as members of First Strike.

In the 2007–2008 miniseries Countdown Presents Lord Havok and the Extremists #1–6, the Americommando and Barracuda are also members of Earth-8's the Meta Militia, an updated version of the Champions of Angor.

In the 2007–2008 miniseries Uncle Sam and the Freedom Fighters (vol. 2) #1–8, a new version of the Crusaders, gathered and controlled by the government, was introduced. This version's members were Captain Triumph, Citizen X, the Libertine, and Magno the Magnetic Man. After they are freed from their mind-controlled state, they team up with Uncle Sam and the Freedom Fighters. Citizen X and the Libertine are killed by aliens in battle.

== Members ==
The Crusaders only appeared in Freedom Fighters #7–9. The names of the team are taken from obscure Golden Age super-heroes:

- The Americommando – actually the Silver Ghost in disguise; the team's counterpart of Captain America
- Rusty – the Americommando's teenaged sidekick and the team's counterpart of Bucky
- Barracuda – the team's counterpart of Namor the Sub-Mariner
- Fireball – the team's counterpart of the Human Torch
- Sparky – Fireball's teenaged sidekick and the team's counterpart of Toro

== See also ==
- Crusaders (Marvel Comics)
- Justice Society of America
- All-Star Squadron
- Young All-Stars
- Freedom Fighters
- Seven Soldiers of Victory
- Invaders
- Liberty Legion
- All-Winners Squad
