= Harand Camp of the Theatre Arts =

American summer camp

Coordinates: 42.620823°N 87.822229°W

Harand Camp of the Theatre Arts is a performing arts summer camp located at Carthage College in Kenosha, Wisconsin and based in Evanston, Illinois.

== Camp Overview ==
Established in 1955, Harand Camp of the Theatre Arts was one of the nation's first camps to combine singing, dancing and acting with traditional Summer camp. Campers (coed, ages 7–17) take part in a non-competitive musical theater program, as well as sports and activities. Campers register for 1, 3 or 6 week overnight sessions.

Camp Living: Campers (ages 7–17) are divided into "cabins" by age and reside together in dorms (2-3 per room). Cabin groups are generally named for famous musicals or movies such as Brigadoon. While the names have fluctuated over the years, for example "Dream Girls" replacing "Cinderella", this chart provides an example from past years:

Year	Boys	Girls
1	Dodge City	Dream Girls, Carousel
2	La Mancha	Brigadoon 2
3	Casablanca	Brigadoon 1
4	Rodeo	Camelot
5	South Pacific	Plain and Fancy
6	Fantastiks	Chorus Line

== Electives & Activities ==
In addition to the theatre program, campers also register for three periods of elective activities per day. The camp operates on an alternating schedule of A-Days (M, W, F) and B-Days (Tu, Th, Sa), so campers actually have six classes of their own choosing. Examples may include Soccer, Basketball, Swimming, Volleyball, Badminton, Cheerleading, Tennis, Fitness, Zumba, Technical Theatre, Costuming, Improv, Audition Coaching, Story Theatre, Hip Hop, Tap, Photography, Film & Video, Arts & Crafts, Creative Writing, Board Games, etc.

== History ==
First established in 1955, Harand came into being as a children's arts studio based in Chicago and area suburbs. Pearl, a former member of the Chicago Repertory Theatre, taught dramatics, while Sulie, known for her one-woman interpretations of classic musicals, taught voice. Other staff included Sulie's husband Byron as Business Manager; Nora Jacobs, who had trained alongside Martha Graham, taught dance; and Byrne and Joyce Piven, future founders of the Piven Theatre Workshop, helped with the acting program. Staff would soon also include Errol Pearlman on piano, Estelle Spector (now head of the Columbia College Musical Theater program) as choreographer, and future Cultural Commissioner, Lois Weisberg, in drama.

The studio curriculum focused primarily on musical theater with an emphasis on the community spirit and equal opportunity for which the camp would later become known. The studio was also the first to combine training in all three musical theater disciplines – singing, dancing, and acting. The children loved it so much that they never wanted to go home so many parents suggested expanding the program to a full camp in the summer months. Pearl once told the Chicago Reader that the "dream [had] always been to have a place where kids can laugh and play, where they can develop their whole personality while learning through shared experiences." That dream became a reality when a resort in Elkhart Lake, Wisconsin became available.

Led by Sulie and Pearl, along with husbands Byron and Sam, Harand Camp of the Theatre Arts opened its doors in the summer of 1955 with a staff composed primarily of the studio team and 87 campers—a number that grew to over 250 in just three years. The buildings were renamed after popular shows with the theatre deemed "Carnegie Hall" after the famed venue in New York. Campers were split into groups designated by show names such as Brigadoon (a tradition that continues today) and became known as "Haranders."

In 1989 the Harand family sold the camp property in Elkhart Lake; however, the camp continued to live on and moved to Wayland Academy, a preparatory school in Beaver Dam, Wisconsin. In 2005 the camp relocated to Carthage College in Kenosha.

== Harand Academy ==
In 2013 the Harand Academy of the Arts was launched as a separate non-profit, offering performing arts classes and shows at Starland in Deerfield, IL. The academy is inspired by the original Harand Studios of the Theatre Arts started by Sulie and Pearl Harand in the 1950s in Downtown Chicago.

== Notable alumni ==
- Richard Berman, Film Producer - Grumpy Old Men (film)
- Bruce Block, Film Producer - What Women Want
- Billy Campbell, Actor The Killing (U.S. TV series), The 4400, Once & Again
- Justin "Nobunny" Champlin, masked punk rocker Love Visions, Raw Romance, First Blood
- Ben Cohen, Broadway stage actor, Gypsy: A Musical Fable
- Andy Davis, Golden Globe nominated film director, producer and cinematographer, The Fugitive (film), Holes (film)
- Russ Feingold, Former U.S. Senator from Wisconsin
- Jessie Fisher, Jeff Award-Winning Actress
- Sean Healy- National Concert Promoter
- Aaron Himelstein, actor
- Brad Holcman, Television Development Executive, FOX21 and A&E Average Joe contestant
- Laura Lippman, author ("Tess Monaghan" mystery series)
- Lissie, American folk rock artist and Paste Magazine's #1 best new solo artist of 2010
- Todd London, playwright and artistic director of New Dramatists
- Virginia Madsen, Oscar nominated Actress, Sideways
- Elyse Mueller, actress and model
- Deborah Robins, folksinger and recording artist 2016 solo CD "Lone Journey"
- Jeremy Piven, Emmy Award winning actor, Entourage
- Duane Schuler, lighting designer, Lyric Opera, Metropolitan Opera
- TJ Shanoff, radio personality and musical director at The Second City
- Erin Slattery, Costume designer, Emmy Award winner for costume on Sesame Street.
- David Brian Stuart, Founder/Executive Producer; Improv Playhouse Theater, Director, SAG-AFTRA Actor, former staff of The Players Workshop, mentored by Josephine Forsberg
- Lois Weisberg, Former Commissioner of the Chicago Department of Cultural Affairs
- Albert "Bill" Williams - Theater Critic (Chicago Reader)
- Jessica Poter, writer, Hot in Cleveland, Blackish
- Billy Zane, actor, Dead Calm (film), The Phantom and Titanic.
- John Zuiker, Jeff Award-Winning Scenic Designer
- Adriana DeGirolami, actor

== News Articles ==
- WGN Radio Interview with Co-Director Janice Gaffin
- Chicago Reader - "Sister Act"
- Oy!Chicago - "There's No Place Like Summer Camp"
- Madison Magazine - "Hip-hip Harand!"
- NWI Times - "All The World's A Stage"
- Chicago Tribune - "Theater Camp Founder..."
- Chicago Reader - "Harand Camp at 55"
- Broadway World - Harand Academy to Launch at Starland in Deerfield
