= First Strike (DC Comics) =

First Strike is a fictional government funded team of superheroes published by DC Comics. They first appeared in Uncle Sam and the Freedom Fighters #3 (November 2006), and were created by Jimmy Palmiotti, Justin Gray and Daniel Acuña. The team is largely an allegory for the perils of "unrestricted state power and authority".

== History ==
First Strike was sent to the Arizona desert by their commanding officer Father Time, to bring the Freedom Fighters back to S.H.A.D.E. headquarters and to arrest Uncle Sam. When the Freedom Fighters refused to go peacefully, they engaged in a fight that First Strike won until the new Black Condor made the scene. Having over-powered First Strike, this allowed the Freedom Fighters some time to get back on their feet. Human Bomb, one of the Freedom Fighters, killed Propaganda, a member of First Strike.

First Strike returned to S.H.A.D.E. headquarters. Father Time was disappointed with their loss, and expressed his anger by ripping off Chief Justice's pinky finger.

The team returned when the Freedom Fighters attacked a plane containing Gonzo the Mechanical Bastard who was being used by S.H.A.D.E. to imitate the President of the United States. First Strike failed again to defeat the Freedom Fighters, with Americommando killed in the battle.

== Members ==
- Americommando: First Strike's second commander. Depicted with a blonde buzz cut and blue eyes, he is cold, merciless, and considers himself indestructible. Uncle Sam flicked him into the moon. His name is David.
- Barracuda: Female with a green, fish like appearance, a trident-like weapon and a gold suit. She is not actually a fish though.
- Chief Justice: Former commander, he can fire energy bolts and can fly. Unlike his teammates, he would rather solve things peacefully rather than have a bloodbath break out. He had his left pinky finger ripped off by Father Time because of their failure on the field.
- Embargo: She can create nearly invincible blue force fields that are difficult to penetrate, however strong characters like Black Condor are able to destroy them.
- Lady Liberty: The fourth person to take up the Lady Liberty name and the only one of them who hasn't been killed. After Phantom Lady destroyed her power outfit, The Ray zipped her into a nude beach in Spain.
- Railgun: Has a metallic appearance with guns for arms. After he made fun of Doll Man, it was believed that he killed Railgun with a miniature cerebral hand-grenade, but he reappeared in Uncle Sam and the Freedom Fighters #8.
- Red Shift: A red skinned, white haired speedster who appears to have superstrength, and is sheathed in a red aura.
- Silent Majority: Able to create multiple duplicates of himself, former member of the Force of July.
- Spin Doctor: The team's first resident speedster. He also has the ability to induce vertigo by touch. He was killed by First Strike's second commander, Americommando, for calling him an angry 'roid head'.
- Spin Doctor: After killing the first one, Americommando requested for one who was pretty, cold-blooded, petite, and "preferably mute". He didn't get the latter.
- Propaganda: A telepath who can spread cerebral information, can undermine free will, subjugate a person's ideology, and crush someone's opinion of self-worth. He was killed by the Human Bomb.
