= Last Blood =

Last Blood or variation, may refer to:

== Film ==
- The Last Blood (1983 film) or Tornado: The Last Blood, an Italian war film
- The Last Blood or Hard Boiled 2, a 1991 Hong Kong action film
- Last Blood (2009 film) or Blood: The Last Vampire, a Japanese vampire film
- Rambo: Last Blood, a 2019 American action film

== Literature ==
- Last Blood (webcomic), a zombie and vampire series published by Blatant Comics
- Last Blood (Blade of the Immortal), volume 14 of the Japanese manga comic, see List of Blade of the Immortal chapters
- Last Blood (2013 novel), volume 5 of House of Commaré novel series by Kristen Painter

== Other uses ==
- Last Blood (DVD), volume 12 of Baki the Grappler

== See also ==
- First Blood (disambiguation)
- Blood (disambiguation)
- Last (disambiguation)
