= Darwin Jones =

- Darwin Jones (far right) as depicted in Strange Adventures #1. Art by Paul Norris.

Publication information
- Publisher: DC Comics
- First appearance: Strange Adventures #1 (August 1950)
- Created by: David V. Reed (writer); Paul Norris (artist)

In-story information
- Alter ego: Darwin Jones
- Team affiliations: D.S.I.
- Abilities: Analytical mind; Heightened deductive reasoning; Polymath

Darwin Jones is a fictional character appearing in media published by DC Comics. He first appeared in Strange Adventures #1 (August 1950), and was created by David V Reed and Paul Norris.

== Publication history ==
The first Darwin Jones story appeared in Strange Adventures #1 (August 1950), written by creator David V Reed, (better known for his war and fantasy stories), and drawn by artist Paul Norris and inker Bernard Sachs. This was a single appearance as opposed to the start of a series - there were no further stories until Strange Adventures #48 (September 1954). His further appearances in the 1950s were irregular - Strange Adventures #58 (1955), #66 and #70 (1956), #76, #77, #79 and #84 (1957), then #88 and #93 (1958), after which no Darwin Jones stories were published until he eventually re-appeared in Strange Adventures #149 (February 1963) and a last story in Strange Adventures #160 (January 1964). Although he utilised many of the classic National writers and artists of the day, Strange Adventures editor Julius Schwartz made no attempt at continuity with the production team on the stories. In thirteen stories Darwin Jones was penned by no less than eight authors: his creator David V Reed, Gardner Fox, Sid Gerson, Bill Finger, Joe Samachson, Otto Binder, John Broome, and Ed Herron, and an equally large number of artists, including Carmine Infantino, Sy Barry, Gil Kane, John Giunta, Joe Giella and Murphy Anderson.

An oddity of the series is that none of the stories were actually headlined as Darwin Jones tales, and many do not even mention him until part way through the story.

Since then there have been no further Darwin Jones stories as such; he has only made a small number of minor appearances in other titles - Daring New Adventures of Supergirl #7 (May 1983), a cameo role in the DC Comics cross-over story Crisis on Infinite Earths #9 (1985), the out-of-continuity DC staff round robin adventure DC Challenge #4-6 (February 1986 - April 1986), Power of the Atom #15 (August 1989), Action Comics #683 (November 1992) and Underworld Unleashed: Patterns of Fear #1 (December 1995).

The character resurfaced during the Final Crisis storyline. Father Time, the commander of the Super Human Advanced Defense Executive (S.H.A.D.E.) has an off-page conversation with an unseen 'Darwin'. Although this has not actually been confirmed as Darwin Jones, the two are contemporaneous heads of U.S. Government Agencies (covert or otherwise), both responsible for investigating threats to the country so a link is likely. He is referred to in the Justice League series JL: Cry for Justice (2009).

== Fictional character biography ==
As originally created, Darwin Jones "science detective" was the chief of staff of D.S.I. (The Department of Scientific Investigation), a top secret U.S. Government Bureau which is "called on to solve the unsolveable...to explain the inexplicable...and to understand the things that few men on this Earth have understood". In his first known case he investigated a seemingly immortal actress, deducing a radioactive pool in Mexico that she had swum in while filming may have been the cause. His later investigations mostly involved investigating aliens, most notably rampaging alien snowmen, although an eyeless creature from inside the Earth, a robot from ancient Atlantis, and an evil super-intelligent gorilla (actually a hoax by aliens bent on world domination) also featured.

Later Darwin was made director of the D.S.I. He had also made the acquaintance of a group of youths called the Young Scienceers, who had made him an honorary member, and together with the club president, Tommy Dane, Jones once again defeated an alien plot. After this, nothing is known of his exploits until Lois Lane contacted him to help the Metropolis police solve a murder.

Later, during Crisis on Infinite Earths, Jones investigated the time and space anomalies caused by the Anti-Monitor. By 1989, he and other scientists created a computer mind, 'The Gestalt' - a revolutionary brain implant that links their minds to the Gestalt and each other so they can share knowledge directly. The Gestalt however began working autonomously, creating a cyber-villain, Humbug, which took the Atom to defeat. He next encountered Superman while investigating cattle mutilations and a mysterious plane crash in Ohio, his last actual appearance to date.
