= List of government agencies in comics =

The following is a list of fictional government agencies that have appeared in the mythical universes of various comic books.

== A ==
Name	Publication of first appearance	Publisher
Agency	Vigilante #36 (December 1986)	DC Comics
Aladdin	Rune #1 (January 1994)	Malibu Comics (Ultraverse)
Aladdin Assault Squad	Break-Thru #1 (December 1993)	Malibu Comics (Ultraverse)
A.P.E.S. (All-Purpose Enforcement Squad)	Young Justice #1 (September 1998)	DC Comics
Argent	Secret Origins vol. 2 #14 (May 1987)	DC Comics
A.R.G.U.S.	Justice League vol. 2 #7	DC Comics
A.S.A. (American Security Agency)	Batman and the Outsiders Annual #1 (1984)	DC Comics
A.R.M.O.R. (Altered-Reality Monitoring and Operational Response)	Marvel Zombies 3 #1 (December 2008)	Marvel Comics

== B ==
Name	Publication of first appearance	Publisher
B.A.A. (Bureau of Amplified Animals)	Green Lantern vol. 3 #30 (October 1992)	DC Comics
Black Air	Excalibur #86 (February 1995)	Marvel Comics
B.P.R.D. (Bureau for Paranormal Research and Defense)	Hellboy: Seed of Destruction (1993)	Dark Horse Comics

== C ==
Name	Publication of first appearance	Publisher
CBI (Central Bureau of Intelligence)	Teen Titans vol. 2 Annual #3 (1987)	DC Comics
C.E.M.A. (Cosmic Emergency Management Agency)	Green Lantern vol. 3 #166 (August 2003)	DC Comics
CISO (Canadian International Security Organization)	Captain Canuck #1 (July 1976)	Comely Comix
Checkmate	Checkmate #1 (April 1988)	DC Comics
Checkmate (ШaХ И МаТ!)	Checkmate #32 (December 1990)	DC Comics
Civil Defense Administration	Stormwatch: Team Achilles (2003)	WildStorm Productions
Commission on Superhuman Activities	Captain America #331 (July 1987)	Marvel Comics

== D ==
Name	Publication of first appearance	Publisher
D.E.O. (Department of Extranormal Operations)	Batman #550 (January 1998)	DC Comics
Department H	Uncanny X-Men #140 (December 1980)	Marvel Comics
Department K	Marvel Comics Presents #72 (March 1991)	Marvel Comics
Department PSI (Department for Paranormal Science Investigations)	Wildcore Preview #1 (October 1997)	WildStorm Productions
D.M.A. (Department of Metahuman Affairs)	Wonder Woman vol. 3 #2 (October 2006)	DC Comics
D.U.C.K. (Department of Unknown and Covert Knowledge)	Plasmer #1 (November 1993)	Marvel UK

== E-F ==
Name	Publication of first appearance	Publisher
E.A.G.L.E. (Extranormal Activities Garrison for Law Enforcement)	Kurt Busiek's Astro City #6 (February 1997)	WildStorm Productions
E.P.F. (Earth Protection Force)	2017	IDW
Euromind	Europa #0 (1996)	Marvel Italia
F.D.A.A. (Federal Disaster Assistance Administration)	The American Way #1 (April 2006)	WildStorm Productions
F.I.6	Excalibur #49 (April 1992)	Marvel Comics
Finger, Eye, and Ear	V for Vendetta #1 (September 1988)	DC Comics

== G-N ==
Name	Publication of first appearance	Publisher
G.D.A. (Global Defense Agency)	Brit #1 (July 2003)	Image Comics
G.O.O.D. (Global Organization of Organized Defense)	Richard Dragon: Kung Fu Fighter #1 (April/May 1975)	DC Comics
H.A.M.M.E.R.	Secret Invasion #8 (January 2009)	Marvel Comics
H.A.T.E. (Highest Anti-Terrorism Effort)	Nextwave: Agents of H.A.T.E. #1 (March 2006)	Marvel Comics
Hayoth	Suicide Squad #45 (September 1990)	DC Comics
I.O. (IO, I/O, International Operations)	Wildcats #1 (August 1992)	WildStorm Productions
Knightwatch	Superman/Batman #5 (February 2004)	DC Comics
Lodge	Firearm #0 (November 1993)	Malibu Comics (Ultraverse)
MI: 13	New Excalibur #1 (January 2006)	Marvel Comics

== O-P ==
Name	Publication of first appearance	Publisher
O*N*E* (Office of National Emergency)	House of M: The Day After (January 2006)	Marvel Comics
Project Atom	Captain Atom vol. 3 #1 (1983)	DC Comics
Project Cadmus	Superman's Pal Jimmy Olsen #135 (January 1971)	DC Comics
Project M	Young All-Stars #12 (May 1988)	DC Comics
Project Peacemaker	DCU Heroes Secret Files and Origins #1 (February 1999)	DC Comics

== Q-R ==
Name	Publication of first appearance	Publisher
Quorum	Guy Gardner #16 (January 1994)	DC Comics
R.C.X. (Resources Control Executive)	Captain Britain vol. 2 #1 (January 1985)	Panini Comics
Red Shadows	Suicide Squad #40 (April 1990)	DC Comics
RONOL (Research on the Nature of Light)	The Ray #1 (February 1992)	DC Comics

== S ==
Name	Publication of first appearance	Publisher
S.H.A.D.E. (Super Human Advanced Defense Executive)	Seven Soldiers: Frankenstein #3 (January 2006)	DC Comics
S.H.I.E.L.D. (Strategic Hazard Intervention Espionage and Logistics Directorate)	Strange Tales #135 (August 1965)	Marvel Comics
S.T.A.R.S. (Superhuman Tactical Activities Response Squad)	Maximum Security #1 (November 2000)	Marvel Comics
S.T.O.R.M.	Planetary #11 (September 2000)	WildStorm Productions
Stormwatch	Stormwatch #1 (March 1993)	WildStorm Productions
S.T.R.I.K.E. (Special Tactical Response for International Key Emergencies)	Captain Britain Weekly #17 (February 1977)	Marvel UK
Suicide Squad (Task Force X)	The Brave and the Bold #25 (August 1959)	DC Comics
Superhuman Restraint Unit	Civil War #1 (May 2006)	Marvel Comics
S.W.O.R.D. (Sentient World Observation and Response Department)	Astonishing X-Men vol. 3 #6 (December 2004)	Marvel Comics

== T-Z ==
Name	Publication of first appearance	Publisher
Task Force Delta	Chase #1 (February 1998)	DC Comics
T.H.U.N.D.E.R. (The Higher United Nations Defense Enforcement Reserves)	T.H.U.N.D.E.R. Agents #1 (November 1965)	Tower Comics/DC Comics
U.N.D.E.R.S.E.A. (United Nations Department of Experiment and Research Systems Established at Atlantis)	U.N.D.E.R.S.E.A. Agent #1 (January 1966)	Tower Comics
Université Notre Dame des Ombres (Our Lady of the Shadows University)	Action Comics Weekly #636 (January 1989)	DC Comics
Weapon X Project	Marvel Comics Presents #72 (March 1991)	Marvel Comics
W.H.O. (Weird Happenings Organization)	Excalibur #9 (June 1989)	Marvel UK

== See also ==
- List of government agencies in DC Comics
- List of government agencies in Marvel Comics
