= Preemptive strike (disambiguation) =

A preemptive strike refers to a surprise attack launched with the stated intention of countering an anticipated enemy offensive.

Preemptive strike may also refer to:

- Preemptive Strike (album), a retrospective compilation album of DJ Shadow's singles released on the UK record label Mo'Wax
- Pre-Emptive Strike, a three-track release by American heavy metal band Five Finger Death Punch
- "Preemptive Strike" (TNG episode), a seventh season episode of Star Trek: The Next Generation
- Pre-Emptive Strike (Villains and Vigilantes), an adventure for the role-playing game Villains and Vigilantes
- Pre-Emptive Strike (EP), an EP by the band Five Finger Death Punch
- Pre-emptive nuclear strike

== See also ==
- Preventive war
- First strike (disambiguation)
