= First strike =

First strike most commonly refers to:

- First strike (nuclear strategy)
- Preemptive war

First strike may also refer to:

== Film and television ==
- First Strike (1979 film), a United States Air Force documentary
- First Strike (1996 film), a Hong Kong action film starring Jackie Chan
- Tales of Vesperia: The First Strike, a 2009 Japanese animated film
- "First Strike" (Stargate Atlantis), a 2007 TV episode
- First Strike, a 2017 short film directed by Peter Kerek

== Books and comics ==
- First Strike (DC Comics), a fictional team of superheroes
- First Strike (IDW Publishing), a 2017 crossover event set in the Hasbro Universe
- Halo: First Strike, a 2003 science fiction novel by Eric Nylund, based on the video game series
- First Strike, a 1979 novel by Douglas Terman

== Other uses ==
- First Strike (album), a 1983 album by Cobra
- First strike (coinage), the first coins struck from a new set of dies

== See also ==
- First use (disambiguation)
- First Blood (disambiguation)
- Strike (disambiguation)
