= Uncle Sam (Vertigo) =

1997 two-part comic book miniseries

- Cover of the first issue

Publication information
- Publisher: DC Comics
- Format: Miniseries
- Publication date: 1997
- No. of issues: 2
- Main character: Uncle Sam

Creative team
- Created by: Steve Darnall; Alex Ross
- Written by: Steve Darnall; Alex Ross
- Artist: Alex Ross
- Letterer: Todd Klein
- Colorist: Alex Ross

Collected editions
- Deluxe Edition: ISBN 1-4012-2348-6

Uncle Sam is a two-part prestige format comic book miniseries published by DC Comics' Vertigo imprint in 1997 and featuring the character of the same name. It was written by Steve Darnall with art by Alex Ross.

== Story ==
The story centers around Sam, an obviously distressed homeless man, who wanders the streets of an unnamed city speaking mostly in odd quotes and sound bites. As he wanders, he has flashes into the lives of poor and struggling Americans, and injustices as they happen all across the United States. He searches his memory trying to pinpoint the moment where the dream he once had for the country went wrong. His mind flits through the darkest moments in American history, from the assassination of John F. Kennedy to the Indian Wars, to slavery, lynchings, the Civil Rights Movement, the Dust Bowl and the Andersonville death camp during the Civil War. Throughout his wanderings, he occasionally encounters a woman named Bea, whose relationship to himself he cannot quite remember. It is implied that he was once an ordinary man who left his home to fight in the American Revolutionary War.

He stumbles across an election parade where a corrupt governor is giving a victory speech after defaming his honest opponent. Unlike the audience Sam is able to hear beyond his platitudes and hear the man's true thoughts, and as protestors are dragged off to prison, Sam tries to confront the governor, when he is stopped by a doppelgänger who resembles the cleaner, more traditional Uncle Sam. His double warns him not to interfere, and claims that he is the true Uncle Sam - the embodiment of the United States. Sam tries to strike out at his double but is dragged off to prison with the protestors. He is released after a mysterious woman intercedes for him.

Wandering alone again, Sam meets and has a conversation with Britannia. She reminisces about the fall of the British Empire and about America's forays into imperialism. After a gang of teenagers try to set him on fire, Sam finally recalls the memory he has been searching for, which was of himself participating in the bloody crushing of Shays' Rebellion. He begins to wonder if America's ideals didn't die, but were never seriously respected from the beginning.

Eventually, after hearing cryptic words from another homeless man, he comes to the remains of the 1893 World's Columbian Exposition, where he sees Bea once more, now recognizing her as Columbia. She helps Sam gain a more nuanced perspective of his visions of America's negative moments of its history, such as how Shays' Rebellion prompted the writing of the Constitution of the United States to help create a more stable government. She tells him that the double he encountered is his own darker side, explaining that after World War I Americans were faced with the dark realities of their country and chose to deny it, creating the other Uncle Sam. Bea tells Sam he has to confront this darker side alone. He has further encounters with Britannia, Marianne and a scarred Russian Bear, who offer him advice and encouragement before he confronts the dark, corrupt, overtly capitalist shadow version of himself sitting on a throne made of televisions with his feet propped on the dome of the United States Capitol. The two exchange blows, but Sam forces his dark side to see the brutal reality of modern-day America, and eventually defeats this figure by accepting all its blows, recognizing and accepting his mistakes, and learning from them.

Towards the end of the tale he thinks to himself: "It's a strange and frightening thing — to see yourself at your worst".

In the end he is seen again as a homeless man, but instead of wildly hallucinating, he is now chipper and optimistic with his traditional hat. He walks off ready to face the future, as Bea watches him go, unseen.

== Collected editions ==
In 1998 the series was collected as a trade paperback (Vertigo ISBN 1-56389-482-3, Titan Books ISBN 1-84023-083-5). In late 2009 it was collected into a Deluxe Edition hardcover (Vertigo ISBN 1-4012-2348-6, Titan Books ISBN 1-84856-284-5).

The collected volume also includes an essay on the history of Uncle Sam as well as several pages of art by Ross.

== Reception ==
The series was very well received by critics, earning praise from Kirkus Reviews, The San Francisco Chronicle and Alan Moore, among others.

== Awards ==
The comics were nominated for an Eisner Award.
