= First Blood (disambiguation) =

First Blood is a 1982 film starring Sylvester Stallone also known as Rambo: First Blood.

First Blood may also refer to:

== Literature ==
- "First Blood" (short story), a 1930 short story by F. Scott Fitzgerald
- First Blood, a 1953 novel by Jack Schaefer
- First Blood (novel), a 1972 novel by David Morrell, basis for the 1982 film
- First Blood, a 1977 novel by Ralph Hayes, under the pseudonym Peter McCurtin
- First Blood, a 1980 novel by Charles Whiting, under the pseudonym Klaus Konrad
- First Blood, a 1983 novel by Elizabeth Smither
- The First Blood, a 1992 novel by Lou Cameron
- First Blood, a 1993 novel by Claire Rayner
- First Blood, a 2003 short story anthology by Lynn Abbey, the fifth Thieves' World omnibus
- First Blood, a 2008 short story anthology by Meljean Brook, Chris Marie Green, Erin McCarthy and Susan Sizemore
- First Blood, a 2019 novel by Angela Marsons
- First Blood, a 2021 novel by Amélie Nothomb
- First Blood, a 2022 novel by Zelda Knight

== Music ==
- First Blood (band), an American hardcore band
- "First Blood", a song by AC/DC from Fly on the Wall, 1985

=== Albums ===
- First Blood (Nobunny album), 2010
- First Blood (Psychopomps album), 1996
- First Blood, an album by Mike Henderson & The Bluebloods, 1996
- 1st Blood, an album by The Ricecookers, 2006

== Television episodes ==
- First Blood (Dexter), an episode of the American television series Dexter
- "First Blood" (Family Guy)
- "First Blood" (The Handmaid's Tale)
- "First Blood" (Supernatural)
- "First Blood" (Wentworth)

== Other uses ==
- First Blood match, a type of professional wrestling match
- First Blood: A Play in Four Acts, a 1924 play by Allan Monkhouse
- Rambo (franchise), also known as the First Blood franchise
- First Blood, a painting by André Durand
- A type of a dueling-rule under which the duel is concluded when one draws first blood, rather than fighting the duel to the death

== See also ==
- Rambo: First Blood Part II, a 1985 Sylvester Stallone film also called Rambo II
- Menarche, the first menstrual bleeding in female humans
- Last Blood (disambiguation)
