= First use =

First use may refer to:

- First use of nuclear weapons
- No first use (of nuclear weapons)
- Trust on first use (computing)
- First use of drugs in relation to the potential becoming addicted immediately

== See also ==
- First-time user experience
- First strike (disambiguation)
