= List of Blade of the Immortal chapters =

Blade of the Immortal #1, published by Dark Horse Comics in June 1996

The chapters of the Japanese manga series Blade of the Immortal are written and illustrated by Hiroaki Samura. It was serialized in Kodansha's seinen manga magazine Monthly Afternoon from June 1993 to December 2012, with its chapters collected in 30 tankōbon volumes published between September 1994 and February 2013. The English language version of the manga was published by Dark Horse Comics, compiled in 31 volumes between March 1997 and April 2015. The English language volumes do not directly correspond to the Japanese volumes. An 3-in-1 omnibus edition of the Dark Horse volumes were published from October 2020 to October 2023.

A sequel manga series titled Blade of the Immortal: Bakumatsu Arc (無限の住人～幕末ノ章～, Mugen no Jūnin: Bakumatsu no Shō), written by Kenji Takigawa and illustrated by Ryū Suenobu with Samura's collaboration, was serialized in Monthly Afternoon from May 2019 to May 2024, with its chapters compiled in ten tankōbon volumes published between October 2019 and August 2024.

== Japanese volume list ==
No.	Japanese release date	Japanese ISBN
1	September 22, 1994	978-4-06-314090-3
"Antelude: Criminal" (序幕 罪人, Jomaku Togabito); "Act 1: Conquest" (第一幕 征服, Dai Ichi Maku Seifuku); "Act 2: Genius" (第二幕 天才, Dai Ni Maku Tensai); "Act 3: Fanatic" (第三幕 執人, Dai San Maku Shūjin)
2	December 17, 1994	978-4-06-314101-6
"Act 4: Cry of the Worm - Path of Fire" (第四幕 蟲の唄・火途, Dai Yon Maku Mushi no Uta - Kazu); "Act 5: Cry of the Worm - Path of Blood" (第五幕 蟲の唄・血途, Dai Go Maku Mushi no Uta - Ketsuzu); "Act 6: Cry of the Worm - Path of the Sword" (第六幕 蟲の唄・刀途, Dai Roku Maku Mushi no Uta - Tōzu); "Act 7: Dreamsong (Part 1)" (第七幕 夢弾＜其の一＞, Dai Nana Maku Yumebiki (Sono Ichi)); "Act 8: Dreamsong (Part 2)" (第八幕 夢弾＜其の二＞, Dai Hachi Maku Yumebiki (Sono Ni))
3	April 21, 1995	978-4-06-314109-2
"Act 9: Dreamsong (Part 3)" (第九幕 夢弾＜其の三＞, Dai Kyū Maku Yumebiki (Sono San)); "Act 10: Dreamsong (Part 4)" (第十幕 夢弾＜其の四＞, Dai Jū Maku Yumebiki (Sono Yon)); "Act 11: Dreamsong (Part 5)" (第十一幕 夢弾＜其の五＞, Dai Jū Ichi Maku Yumebiki (Sono Go)); "Act 12: Rin's Bane (Part 1)" (第十二幕 斜凜＜其の一＞, Dai Jū Ni Maku Sharin (Sono Ichi)); "Act 13: Rin's Bane (Part 2)" (第十三幕 斜凜＜其の二＞, Dai Jū San Maku Sharin (Sono Ni))
4	October 23, 1995	978-4-06-314119-1
"Act 14: On Silent Wings (Part 1)" (第十四幕 羽根は静かに＜其の一＞, Dai Jū Yon Maku Hane wa Shizuka ni (Sono Ichi)); "Act 15: On Silent Wings (Part 2)" (第十五幕 羽根は静かに＜其の二＞, Dai Jū Go Maku Hane wa Shizuka ni (Sono Ni)); "Act 16: On Silent Wings (Part 3)" (第十六幕 羽根は静かに＜其の三＞, Dai Jū Roku Maku Hane wa Shizuka ni (Sono San)); "Act 17: On Silent Wings (Part 4)" (第十七幕 羽根は静かに＜其の四＞, Dai Jū Nana Maku Hane wa Shizuka ni (Sono Yon)); "Act 18: On Silent Wings (Part 5)" (第十八幕 羽根は静かに＜其の五＞, Dai Jū Hachi Maku Hane wa Shizuka ni (Sono Go)); "Act 19: On Silent Wings (Part 6)" (第十九幕 羽根は静かに＜其の六＞, Dai Jū Kyū Maku Hane wa Shizuka ni (Sono Roku))
5	August 23, 1996	978-4-06-314137-5
"Act 20: On Silent Wings (Part 7)" (第二十幕 羽根は静かに＜其の七＞, Dai Ni Jū Maku Hane wa Shizuka ni (Sono Nana)); "Act 21: Dark Shadows (Part 1)" (第二十一幕 凶影＜其の一＞, Dai Ni Jū Ichi Maku Kyōei (Sono Ichi)); "Act 22: Dark Shadows (Part 2)" (第二十二幕 凶影＜其の二＞, Dai Ni Jū Ni Maku Kyōei (Sono Ni)); "Act 23: Dark Shadows (Part 3)" (第二十三幕 凶影＜其の三＞, Dai Ni Jū San Maku Kyōei (Sono San)); "Act 24: Food" (第二十四幕 糧, Dai Ni Jū Yon Maku Kate)
6	June 23, 1997	978-4-06-314151-1
"Act 25: Heart of Darkness (Part 1)" (第二十五幕 現ズル事無キ代物＜其の一＞, Dai Ni Jū Go Maku Genzuru Koto Naki Shiromono (Sono Ichi)); "Act 26: Heart of Darkness (Part 2)" (第二十六幕 現ズル事無キ代物＜其の二＞, Dai Ni Jū Roku Maku Genzuru Koto Naki Shiromono (Sono Ni)); "Act 27: Heart of Darkness (Part 3)" (第二十七幕 現ズル事無キ代物＜其の三＞, Dai Ni Jū Nana Maku Genzuru Koto Naki Shiromono (Sono San)); "Act 28: Heart of Darkness (Part 4)" (第二十八幕 現ズル事無キ代物＜其の四＞, Dai Ni Jū Hachi Maku Genzuru Koto Naki Shiromono (Sono Yon)); "Act 29: Heart of Darkness (Part 5)" (第二十九幕 現ズル事無キ代物＜其の五＞, Dai Ni Jū Kyū Maku Genzuru Koto Naki Shiromono (Sono Go)); "Act 30: Heart of Darkness (Part 6)" (第三十幕 現ズル事無キ代物＜其の六＞, Dai San Jū Maku Genzuru Koto Naki Shiromono (Sono Roku)); "Act 31: Heart of Darkness (Part 7)" (第三十一幕 現ズル事無キ代物＜其の七＞, Dai San Jū Ichi Maku Genzuru Koto Naki Shiromono (Sono Nana))
7	October 23, 1997	978-4-06-314165-8
"Act 32: The Gathering (Mongrel)" (第三十二幕 群＜斑＞, Dai San Jū Ni Maku Mura (Madara)); "Act 33: The Gathering (Storm - Part 1)" (第三十三幕 群＜叢雨・其の一＞, Dai San Jū San Maku Mura (Murasame - Sono Ichi)); "Act 34: The Gathering (Storm - Part 2)" (第三十四幕 群＜叢雨・其の二＞, Dai San Jū Yon Maku Mura (Murasame - Sono Ni)); "Act 35: The Gathering (Stigma - Part 1)" (第三十五幕 群＜村鋒・其の一＞, Dai San Jū Go Maku Mura (Murahachi - Sono Ichi)); "Act 36: The Gathering (Stigma - Part 2)" (第三十六幕 群＜村鋒・其の二＞, Dai San Jū Roku Maku Mura (Murahachi - Sono Ni)); "Act 37: The Gathering (Comrades - Part 1)" (第三十七幕 群＜群れ・其の一＞, Dai San Jū Nana Maku Mura (Mure - Sono Ichi)); "Act 38: The Gathering (Comrades - Part 2)" (第三十八幕 群＜群れ・其の二＞, Dai San Jū Hachi Maku Mura (Mure - Sono Ni)); "Act 39: The Gathering (Comrades - Part 3)" (第三十九幕 群＜群れ・其の三＞, Dai San Jū Kyū Maku Mura (Mure - Sono San)); "Act 40: The Gathering (Comrades - Part 4)" (第四十幕 群＜群れ・其の四＞, Dai Yon Jū Maku Mura (Mure - Sono Yon))
8	July 23, 1998	978-4-06-314183-2
"Act 41: The Gathering (Comrades - Part 5)" (第四十一幕 群＜群れ・其の五＞, Dai Yon Jū Ichi Maku Mura (Mure - Sono Go)); "Act 42: The Gathering (Comrades - Part 6)" (第四十二幕 群＜群れ・其の六＞, Dai Yon Jū Ni Maku Mura (Mure - Sono Roku)); "Act 43: The Gathering (Rage)" (第四十三幕 群＜焔＞, Dai Yon Jū San Maku Mura (Homura)); "Act 44: The Gathering (Cloudburst - Part 1)" (第四十四幕 群＜叢時雨・其の一＞, Dai Yon Jū Yon Maku Mura (Murashigure - Sono Ichi)); "Act 45: The Gathering (Cloudburst - Part 2)" (第四十五幕 群＜叢時雨・其の二＞, Dai Yon Jū Go Maku Mura (Murashigure - Sono Ni)); "Act 46: Secrets (Part 1)" (第四十六幕 ひそかなる＜其の一＞, Dai Yon Jū Roku Maku Hisoka naru (Sono Ichi)); "Act 47: Secrets (Part 2)" (第四十七幕 ひそかなる＜其の二＞, Dai Yon Jū Nana Maku Hisoka naru (Sono Ni))
9	June 23, 1999	978-4-06-314210-5
"Act 48: Secrets (Part 3)" (第四十八幕 ひそかなる＜其の三＞, Dai Yon Jū Hachi Maku Hisoka naru (Sono San)); "Act 49: Stigmata" (第四十九幕 血のあとさき, Dai Yon Jū Kyū Maku Chi no Atosaki); "Act 50: Husk" (第五十幕 殻, Dai Go Jū Maku Kara); "Act 51: Skin (Part 1)" (第五十一幕 裸行＜其の一＞, Dai Go Jū Ichi Maku Ragyō (Sono Ichi)); "Act 52: Skin (Part 2)" (第五十二幕 裸行＜其の二＞, Dai Go Jū Ni Maku Ragyō (Sono Ni)); "Act 53: Beasts (Part 1)" (第五十三幕 獣＜其の一＞, Dai Go Jū San Maku Kemono (Sono Ichi))
10	April 21, 2000	978-4-06-314238-9
"Act 54: Beasts (Part 2)" (第五十四幕 獣＜其の二＞, Dai Go Jū Yon Maku Kemono (Sono Ni)); "Act 55: Beasts (Part 3)" (第五十五幕 獣＜其の三＞, Dai Go Jū Go Maku Kemono (Sono San)); "Act 56: Beasts (Part 4)" (第五十六幕 獣＜其の四＞, Dai Go Jū Roku Maku Kemono (Sono Yon)); "Act 57: Beasts (Part 5)" (第五十七幕 獣＜其の五＞, Dai Go Jū Nana Maku Kemono (Sono Go)); "Act 58: Autumn Frost (Part 1)" (第五十八幕 秋霜＜其の一＞, Dai Go Jū Hachi Maku Shūsō (Sono Ichi)); "Act 59: Autumn Frost (Part 2)" (第五十九幕 秋霜＜其の二＞, Dai Go Jū Kyū Maku Shūsō (Sono Ni))
11	January 23, 2001	978-4-06-314259-4
"Act 60: Autumn Frost (Part 3)" (第六十幕 秋霜＜其の三＞, Dai Roku Jū Maku Shūsō (Sono San)); "Act 61: Autumn Frost (Part 4)" (第六十一幕 秋霜＜其の四＞, Dai Roku Jū Ichi Maku Shūsō (Sono Yon)); "Act 62: Autumn Frost (Part 5)" (第六十二幕 秋霜＜其の五＞, Dai Roku Jū Ni Maku Shūsō (Sono Go)); "Act 63: Autumn Frost (Part 6)" (第六十三幕 秋霜＜其の六＞, Dai Roku Jū San Maku Shūsō (Sono Roku)); "Act 64: The Wind and the Heron" (第六十四幕 風盗人, Dai Roku Jū Yon Maku Kazanusutto); "Act 65: Cherry Blossom" (第六十五幕 花盗人, Dai Roku Jū Go Maku Hananusutto); "Act 66: Shadows" (第六十六幕 形影, Dai Roku Jū Roku Maku Keiei); "Act 67: Mourning Shadows" (第六十七幕 形影相弔フ, Dai Roku Jū Nana Maku Keiei Aitomurau)
12	February 22, 2002	978-4-06-314268-6
"Act 68: Path of Shadows" (第六十八幕 形影相伴ふ, Dai Roku Jū Hachi Maku Keiei Aitomonau); "Act 69: Thorns" (第六十九幕 棘, Dai Roku Jū Kyū Maku Toge); "Act 70: Mirror of the Soul (Part 1)" (第七十幕 浄玻璃＜其の一＞, Dai Nana Jū Maku Jōhari (Sono Ichi)); "Act 71: Mirror of the Soul (Part 2)" (第七十一幕 浄玻璃＜其の二＞, Dai Nana Jū Ichi Maku Jōhari (Sono Ni)); "Act 72: Mirror of the Soul (Part 3)" (第七十二幕 浄玻璃＜其の三＞, Dai Nana Jū Ni Maku Jōhari (Sono San)); "Act 73: Light and Shadow" (第七十三幕 燐と陰, Dai Nana Jū San Maku Rin to Kage); "Act 74: Crossroads" (第七十四幕 岐, Dai Nana Jū Yon Maku Ki); "Act 75: Last Blood (Part 1)" (第七十五幕 終血＜其の一＞, Dai Nana Jū Go Maku Shūketsu (Sono Ichi))
13	November 22, 2002	978-4-06-314306-5
"Act 76: Last Blood (Part 2)" (第七十六幕 終血＜其の二＞, Dai Nana Jū Roku Maku Shūketsu (Sono Ni)); "Act 77: Last Blood (Part 3)" (第七十七幕 終血＜其の三＞, Dai Nana Jū Nana Maku Shūketsu (Sono San)); "Act 78: Last Blood (Part 4)" (第七十八幕 終血＜其の四＞, Dai Nana Jū Hachi Maku Shūketsu (Sono Yon)); "Act 79: Last Blood (Part 5)" (第七十九幕 終血＜其の五＞, Dai Nana Jū Kyū Maku Shūketsu (Sono Go)); "Act 80: Confession" (第八十幕 吐, Dai Hachi Jū Maku To); "Act 81: Twilight (Part 1)" (第八十一幕 誰そ彼＜其の一＞, Dai Hachi Jū Ichi Maku Ta so Kare (Sono Ichi)); "Act 82: Twilight (Part 2)" (第八十二幕 誰そ彼＜其の二＞, Dai Hachi Jū Ni Maku Ta so Kare (Sono Ni)); "Act 83: Twilight (Part 3)" (第八十三幕 誰そ彼＜其の三＞, Dai Hachi Jū San Maku Ta so Kare (Sono San))
14	July 23, 2003	978-4-06-314326-3
"Act 84: Trickster (Part 1)" (第八十四幕 彼は誰＜其の一＞, Dai Hachi Jū Yon Maku Ka wa Tare (Sono Ichi)); "Act 85: Trickster (Part 2)" (第八十五幕 彼は誰＜其の二＞, Dai Hachi Jū Go Maku Ka wa Tare (Sono Ni)); "Act 86: Trickster (Part 3)" (第八十六幕 彼は誰＜其の三＞, Dai Hachi Jū Roku Maku Ka wa Tare (Sono San)); "Act 87: Trickster (Part 4)" (第八十七幕 彼は誰＜其の四＞, Dai Hachi Jū Nana Maku Ka wa Tare (Sono Yon)); "Act 88: Trickster (Part 5)" (第八十八幕 彼は誰＜其の五＞, Dai Hachi Jū Hachi Maku Ka wa Tare (Sono Go)); "Act 89: Pity" (第八十九幕 惻々と, Dai Hachi Jū Kyū Maku Sokusoku to); "Act 90: Forsaken" (第九十幕 神去, Dai Kyū Jū Maku Kamisari); "Act 91: Duet" (第九十一幕 二人劇, Dai Kyū Jū Ichi Maku Niningeki)
15	January 23, 2004	978-4-06-314337-9
"Act 92: Cauldron" (第九十二幕 鼎, Dai Kyū Jū Ni Maku Tei); "Act 93: An Open Pit" (第九十三幕 開かれた穴, Dai Kyū Jū San Maku Hirakareta Ana); "Act 94: Shortcut (Part 1)" (第九十四幕 捷径＜其の一＞, Dai Kyū Jū Yon Maku Shōkei (Sono Ichi)); "Act 95: Shortcut (Part 2)" (第九十五幕 捷径＜其の二＞, Dai Kyū Jū Go Maku Shōkei (Sono Ni)); "Act 96: Shortcut (Part 3)" (第九十六幕 捷径＜其の三＞, Dai Kyū Jū Roku Maku Shōkei (Sono San)); "Act 97: Shortcut (Part 4)" (第九十七幕 捷径＜其の四＞, Dai Kyū Jū Nana Maku Shōkei (Sono Yon)); "Act 98: Shortcut (Part 5)" (第九十八幕 捷径＜其の五＞, Dai Kyū Jū Hachi Maku Shōkei (Sono Go))
16	May 21, 2004	978-4-06-314348-5
"Act 99: On the Perfection of Anatomy (Part 1)" (第九十九幕 改臓肢儀＜其の一＞, Dai Kyū Jū Kyū Maku Kaizō Shigi (Sono Ichi)); "Act 100: On the Perfection of Anatomy (Part 2)" (第百幕 改臓肢儀＜其の二＞, Dai Hyaku Maku Kaizō Shigi (Sono Ni)); "Act 101: On the Perfection of Anatomy (Part 3)" (第百一幕 改臓肢儀＜其の三＞, Dai Hyaku Ichi Maku Kaizō Shigi (Sono San)); "Act 102: On the Perfection of Anatomy (Part 4)" (第百二幕 改臓肢儀＜其の四＞, Dai Hyaku Ni Maku Kaizō Shigi (Sono Yon)); "Act 103: On the Perfection of Anatomy (Part 5)" (第百三幕 改臓肢儀＜其の五＞, Dai Hyaku San Maku Kaizō Shigi (Sono Go)); "Act 104: On the Perfection of Anatomy (Part 6)" (第百四幕 改臓肢儀＜其の六＞, Dai Hyaku Yon Maku Kaizō Shigi (Sono Roku)); "Act 105: The Sparrow Net (Part 1)" (第百五幕 雀羅＜其の一＞, Dai Hyaku Go Maku Jakura (Sono Ichi))
17	November 22, 2004	978-4-06-314363-8
"Act 106: The Sparrow Net (Part 2)" (第百六幕 雀羅＜其の二＞, Dai Hyaku Roku Maku Jakura (Sono Ni)); "Act 107: The Sparrow Net (Part 3)" (第百七幕 雀羅＜其の三＞, Dai Hyaku Nana Maku Jakura (Sono San)); "Act 108: The Sparrow Net (Part 4)" (第百八幕 雀羅＜其の四＞, Dai Hyaku Hachi Maku Jakura (Sono Yon)); "Act 109: Barefoot (Part 1)" (第百九幕 徒跣＜其の一＞, Dai Hyaku Kyū Maku Kachihadashi (Sono Ichi)); "Act 110: Barefoot (Part 2)" (第百十幕 徒跣＜其の二＞, Dai Hyaku Jū Maku Kachihadashi (Sono Ni)); "Act 111: Barefoot (Part 3)" (第百十一幕 徒跣＜其の三＞, Dai Hyaku Jū Ichi Maku Kachihadashi (Sono San)); "Act 112: Barefoot (Part 4)" (第百十二幕 徒跣＜其の四＞, Dai Hyaku Jū Ni Maku Kachihadashi (Sono Yon)); "Act 113: Barefoot (Part 5)" (第百十三幕 徒跣＜其の五＞, Dai Hyaku Jū San Maku Kachihadashi (Sono Go))
18	June 23, 2005	978-4-06-314380-5
"Act 114: Life or Death" (第百十四幕 活殺, Dai Hyaku Jū Yon Maku Kassatsu); "Act 115: Badger Hole (Part 1)" (第百十五幕 猯の巣＜其の一＞, Dai Hyaku Jū Go Maku Mami no Su (Sono Ichi)); "Act 116: Badger Hole (Part 2)" (第百十六幕 猯の巣＜其の二＞, Dai Hyaku Jū Roku Maku Mami no Su (Sono Ni)); "Act 117: Badger Hole (Part 3)" (第百十七幕 猯の巣＜其の三＞, Dai Hyaku Jū Nana Maku Mami no Su (Sono San)); "Act 118: Badger Hole (Part 4)" (第百十八幕 猯の巣＜其の四＞, Dai Hyaku Jū Hachi Maku Mami no Su (Sono Yon)); "Act 119: Otter Holt (Part 1)" (第百十九幕 獺の巣＜其の一＞, Dai Hyaku Jū Kyū Maku Kawauso no Su (Sono Ichi)); "Act 120: Otter Holt (Part 2)" (第百二十幕 獺の巣＜其の二＞, Dai Hyaku Ni Jū Maku Kawauso no Su (Sono Ni))
19	April 21, 2006	978-4-06-314409-3
"Act 121: Otter Holt (Part 3)" (第百二十一幕 獺の巣＜其の三＞, Dai Hyaku Ni Jū Ichi Maku Kawauso no Su (Sono San)); "Act 122: Demon Lair (Part 1)" (第百二十二幕 鬼の巣＜其の一＞, Dai Hyaku Ni Jū Ni Maku Oni no Su (Sono Ichi)); "Act 123: Demon Lair (Part 2)" (第百二十三幕 鬼の巣＜其の二＞, Dai Hyaku Ni Jū San Maku Oni no Su (Sono Ni)); "Act 124: Demon Lair (Part 3)" (第百二十四幕 鬼の巣＜其の三＞, Dai Hyaku Ni Jū Yon Maku Oni no Su (Sono San)); "Act 125: Demon Lair (Part 4)" (第百二十五幕 鬼の巣＜其の四＞, Dai Hyaku Ni Jū Go Maku Oni no Su (Sono Yon)); "Act 126: Demon Lair (Part 5)" (第百二十六幕 鬼の巣＜其の五＞, Dai Hyaku Ni Jū Roku Maku Oni no Su (Sono Go)); "Act 127: Demon Lair (Part 6)" (第百二十七幕 鬼の巣＜其の六＞, Dai Hyaku Ni Jū Nana Maku Oni no Su (Sono Roku))
20	October 23, 2006	978-4-06-314430-7
"Act 128: Demon Lair (Part 7)" (第百二十八幕 鬼の巣＜其の七＞, Dai Hyaku Ni Jū Hachi Maku Oni no Su (Sono Nana)); "Act 129: Demon Lair (Part 8)" (第百二十九幕 鬼の巣＜其の八＞, Dai Hyaku Ni Jū Kyū Maku Oni no Su (Sono Hachi)); "Act 130: Demon Lair (Part 9)" (第百三十幕 鬼の巣＜其の九＞, Dai Hyaku San Jū Maku Oni no Su (Sono Kyū)); "Act 131: Demon Lair (Part 10)" (第百三十一幕 鬼の巣＜其の十＞, Dai Hyaku San Jū Ichi Maku Oni no Su (Sono Jū)); "Act 132: Demon Lair (Part 11)" (第百三十二幕 鬼の巣＜其の十一＞, Dai Hyaku San Jū Ni Maku Oni no Su (Sono Jū Ichi)); "Act 133: Demon Lair (Part 12)" (第百三十三幕 鬼の巣＜其の十二＞, Dai Hyaku San Jū San Maku Oni no Su (Sono Jū Ni)); "Act 134: On the Perfection of Anatomy (Conclusion)" (第百三十四幕 改臓肢儀＜終章＞, Dai Hyaku San Jū Yon Maku Kaizō Shigi (Shūshō))
21	June 22, 2007	978-4-06-314455-0
"Act 135: Footsteps" (第百三十五幕 跫音, Dai Hyaku San Jū Go Maku Kyōon); "Act 136: Restless Ghosts" (第百三十六幕 鬼哭, Dai Hyaku San Jū Roku Maku Kikoku); "Act 137: Visitors (Part 1)" (第百三十七幕 おとづれ＜其の一＞, Dai Hyaku San Jū Nana Maku Otozure (Sono Ichi)); "Act 138: Visitors (Part 2)" (第百三十八幕 おとづれ＜其の二＞, Dai Hyaku San Jū Hachi Maku Otozure (Sono Ni)); "Act 139: Winter Snow" (第百三十九幕 冬餉抄, Dai Hyaku San Jū Kyū Maku Fuyugeshō); "Act 140: Night Chrysanthemum" (第百四十幕 夜掬, Dai Hyaku Yon Jū Maku Yogiku); "Act 141: Companion (Part 1)" (第百四十一幕 みちづれ＜其の一＞, Dai Hyaku Yon Jū Ichi Maku Michizure (Sono Ichi))
22	December 21, 2007	978-4-06-314480-2
"Act 142: Companion (Part 2)" (第百四十二幕 みちづれ＜其の二＞, Dai Hyaku Yon Jū Ni Maku Michizure (Sono Ni)); "Act 143: Culvert" (第百四十三幕 暗渠, Dai Hyaku Yon Jū San Maku Ankyo); "Act 144: Power and Mist" (第百四十四幕 雲井霞, Dai Hyaku Yon Jū Yon Maku Kumoi Kasumi); "Act 145: Crimson Snowflake" (第百四十五幕 六花紅, Dai Hyaku Yon Jū Go Maku Rokka Kurenai); "Act 146: Traces of the Heart" (第百四十六幕 こころの迹, Dai Hyaku Yon Jū Roku Maku Kokoro no Ato); "Act 147: Testing the Waters" (第百四十七幕 瀬踏, Dai Hyaku Yon Jū Nana Maku Sebumi); "Act 148: Scarlet Swords" (第百四十八幕 緋剣繚乱, Dai Hyaku Yon Jū Hachi Maku Hiken Ryōran)
23	June 23, 2008	978-4-06-314509-0
"Act 149: Entangled" (第百四十九幕 交錯, Dai Hyaku Yon Jū Kyū Maku Kōsaku); "Act 150: White Sheet, Glowing Under the Moonlight" (第百五十幕 帷、月下に白く, Dai Hyaku Go Jū Maku Tobari, Gekka ni Shiroku); "Act 151: Massacre (Part 1)" (第百五十一幕 鏖＜其の一＞, Dai Hyaku Go Jū Ichi Maku Minagoroshi (Sono Ichi)); "Act 152: Massacre (Part 2)" (第百五十二幕 鏖＜其の二＞, Dai Hyaku Go Jū Ni Maku Minagoroshi (Sono Ni)); "Act 153: Massacre (Part 3)" (第百五十三幕 鏖＜其の三＞, Dai Hyaku Go Jū San Maku Minagoroshi (Sono San)); "Act 154: Massacre (Part 4)" (第百五十四幕 鏖＜其の四＞, Dai Hyaku Go Jū Yon Maku Minagoroshi (Sono Yon)); "Act 155: Evasion" (第百五十五幕 遁, Dai Hyaku Go Jū Go Maku Ton)
24	February 23, 2009	978-4-06-314548-9
"Act 156: Snowfall at Dawn" (第百五十六幕 明風花, Dai Hyaku Go Jū Roku Maku Akenokazabana); "Act 157: Snow, Like Blossoms" (第百五十七幕 雪花, Dai Hyaku Go Jū Nana Maku Setsuka); "Act 158: Snow, Moon, Flowers" (第百五十八幕 雪月花, Dai Hyaku Go Jū Hachi Maku Setsugetsuka); "Act 159: Wind, Petals, Snow, Moon" (第百五十九幕 風花雪月, Dai Hyaku Go Jū Kyū Maku Fūkasetsugetsu); "Act 160: On the Perfection of Anatomy - The Untold Truth" (第百六十幕 改臓肢儀・真説, Dai Hyaku Roku Jū Maku Kaizō Shigi - Shinsetsu); "Act 161: Blizzard (Part 1)" (第百六十一幕 霏々として＜其の一＞, Dai Hyaku Roku Jū Ichi Maku Hihi toshite (Sono Ichi)); "Act 162: Blizzard (Part 2)" (第百六十二幕 霏々として＜其の二＞, Dai Hyaku Roku Jū Ni Maku Hihi toshite (Sono Ni))
25	September 23, 2009	978-4-06-314591-5
"Act 163: Blizzard (Part 3)" (第百六十三幕 霏々として＜其の三＞, Dai Hyaku Roku Jū San Maku Hihi toshite (Sono San)); "Act 164: Blizzard (Part 4)" (第百六十四幕 霏々として＜其の四＞, Dai Hyaku Roku Jū Yon Maku Hihi toshite (Sono Yon)); "Act 165: Blizzard (Part 5)" (第百六十五幕 霏々として＜其の五＞, Dai Hyaku Roku Jū Go Maku Hihi toshite (Sono Go)); "Act 166: Blizzard (Part 6)" (第百六十六幕 霏々として＜其の六＞, Dai Hyaku Roku Jū Roku Maku Hihi toshite (Sono Roku)); "Act 167: Blizzard (Part 7)" (第百六十七幕 霏々として＜其の七＞, Dai Hyaku Roku Jū Nana Maku Hihi toshite (Sono Nana)); "Act 168: Food (Part 2)" (第百六十八幕 糧＜其の二＞, Dai Hyaku Roku Jū Hachi Maku Kate (Sono Ni)); "Act 169: Wings, Without Wind" (第百六十九幕 凪ぎて羽根は……, Dai Hyaku Roku Jū Kyū Maku Nagite Hane wa......)
26	May 21, 2010	978-4-06-310654-1
"Act 170: Mist on the Spider's Web" (第百七十幕 くものいの露, Dai Hyaku Nana Jū Maku Kumo no I no Tsuyu); "Act 171: The Pots (Part 1)" (第百七十一幕 壺＜其の一＞, Dai Hyaku Nana Jū Ichi Maku Tsubo (Sono Ichi)); "Act 172: The Pots (Part 2)" (第百七十二幕 壺＜其の二＞, Dai Hyaku Nana Jū Ni Maku Tsubo (Sono Ni)); "Act 173: The Pots (Part 3)" (第百七十三幕 壺＜其の三＞, Dai Hyaku Nana Jū San Maku Tsubo (Sono San)); "Act 174: The Pots (Part 4)" (第百七十四幕 壺＜其の四＞, Dai Hyaku Nana Jū Yon Maku Tsubo (Sono Yon)); "Act 175: The Last Ten (Part 1)" (第百七十五幕 十掉尾＜其の一＞, Dai Hyaku Nana Jū Go Maku Juttōbi (Sono Ichi)); "Act 176: The Last Ten (Part 2)" (第百七十六幕 十掉尾＜其の二＞, Dai Hyaku Nana Jū Roku Maku Juttōbi (Sono Ni)); "Act 177: The Last Ten (Part 3)" (第百七十七幕 十掉尾＜其の三＞, Dai Hyaku Nana Jū Nana Maku Juttōbi (Sono San))
27	January 21, 2011	978-4-06-310722-7
"Act 178: Raining Chaos (Part 1)" (第百七十八幕 鎖乱＜其の一＞, Dai Hyaku Nana Jū Hachi Maku Samidare (Sono Ichi)); "Act 179: Raining Chaos (Part 2)" (第百七十九幕 鎖乱＜其の二＞, Dai Hyaku Nana Jū Kyū Maku Samidare (Sono Ni)); "Act 180: Raining Chaos (Part 3)" (第百八十幕 鎖乱＜其の三＞, Dai Hyaku Hachi Jū Maku Samidare (Sono San)); "Act 181: Raining Chaos (Part 4)" (第百八十一幕 鎖乱＜其の四＞, Dai Hyaku Hachi Jū Ichi Maku Samidare (Sono Yon)); "Act 182: Sullied Snow (Part 1)" (第百八十二幕 泥雪＜其の一＞, Dai Hyaku Hachi Jū Ni Maku Deisetsu (Sono Ichi)); "Act 183: Sullied Snow (Part 2)" (第百八十三幕 泥雪＜其の二＞, Dai Hyaku Hachi Jū San Maku Deisetsu (Sono Ni)); "Act 184: Raining Chaos (Part 5)" (第百八十四幕 鎖乱＜其の五＞, Dai Hyaku Hachi Jū Yon Maku Samidare (Sono Go))
28	October 21, 2011	978-4-06-310775-3
"Act 185: The Chosen Path (Part 1)" (第百八十五幕 道さだめ＜其の一＞, Dai Hyaku Hachi Jū Go Maku Michi Sadame (Sono Ichi)); "Act 186: The Chosen Path (Part 2)" (第百八十六幕 道さだめ＜其の二＞, Dai Hyaku Hachi Jū Roku Maku Michi Sadame (Sono Ni)); "Act 187: Rudderless (Part 1)" (第百八十七幕 楫を絶え＜其の一＞, Dai Hyaku Hachi Jū Nana Maku Kaji o Tae (Sono Ichi)); "Act 188: Rudderless (Part 2)" (第百八十八幕 楫を絶え＜其の二＞, Dai Hyaku Hachi Jū Hachi Maku Kaji o Tae (Sono Ni)); "Act 189: Soul Fire" (第百八十九幕 霊込, Dai Hyaku Hachi Jū Kyū Maku Tamagome); "Act 190: Heavenly Fire" (第百九十幕 天乱発, Dai Hyaku Kyū Jū Maku Ame Rappa); "Act 191: Beyond Good and Evil" (第百九十一幕 彼岸, Dai Hyaku Kyū Jū Ichi Maku Higan)
29	May 23, 2012	978-4-06-387818-9
"Act 192: Kasha" (第百九十二幕 火車, Dai Hyaku Kyū Jū Ni Maku Kasha); "Act 193: Vigilance (Part 1)" (第百九十三幕 墨守＜其の一＞, Dai Hyaku Kyū Jū San Maku Bokushu (Sono Ichi)); "Act 194: Vigilance (Part 2)" (第百九十四幕 墨守＜其の二＞, Dai Hyaku Kyū Jū Yon Maku Bokushu (Sono Ni)); "Act 195: Vigilance (Part 3)" (第百九十五幕 墨守＜其の三＞, Dai Hyaku Kyū Jū Go Maku Bokushu (Sono San)); "Act 196: One Hundred Dances (Part 1)" (第百九十六幕 焉舞百景＜其の一＞, Dai Hyaku Kyū Jū Roku Maku Enbu Hyakkei (Sono Ichi)); "Act 197: One Hundred Dances (Part 2)" (第百九十七幕 焉舞百景＜其の二＞, Dai Hyaku Kyū Jū Nana Maku Enbu Hyakkei (Sono Ni))
30	February 22, 2013	978-4-06-387869-1
"Act 198: One Hundred Dances (Part 3)" (第百九十八幕 焉舞百景＜其の三＞, Dai Hyaku Kyū Jū Hachi Maku Enbu Hyakkei (Sono San)); "Act 199: Glorious Death in Winter Thunder (Part 1)" (第百九十九幕 寒雷散華＜其の一＞, Dai Hyaku Kyū Jū Kyū Maku Kanrai Sange (Sono Ichi)); "Act 200: Glorious Death in Winter Thunder (Part 2)" (第二百幕 寒雷散華＜其の二＞, Dai Ni Hyaku Maku Kanrai Sange (Sono Ni)); "Act 201: Blue Embracing Indigo" (第二百一幕 藍を抱く青, Dai Ni Hyaku Ichi Maku Ai o Idaku Ao); "Act 202: Blade of Remorse" (第二百二幕 無念刀, Dai Ni Hyaku Ni Maku Munengatana); "Act 203: Where Ferocious Winds Contest" (第二百三幕 いと荒ましき風の競ひに, Dai Ni Hyaku San Maku Itoaramashiki Kaze no Kioi ni); "Act 204: May I Ask About Death" (第二百四幕 未知生、焉知死, Dai Ni Hyaku Yon Maku Imada Sei o Shirazu, Izukunzo Shi o Shiran); "Act 205: In the Forgotten, Fluttering Snow" (第二百五幕 忘れ雪ほどろに, Dai Ni Hyaku Go Maku Wasureyuki Hodoro ni); "Final Act: Manji and Rin" (最終幕 卍と凜, Saishū Maku Manji to Rin)

== English-language volume list ==
No.	Title	English release date	English ISBN
1	Blood of a Thousand	March 1, 1997	978-1-56971-239-9
1. "Prologue: Criminal"; 2. "Conquest"; 2. "Genius"
2	Cry of the Worm	April 1, 1998	978-1-56971-300-6
3. "Fanatic"; 4. "Cry of the Worm Part 1: Path of Fire"; 5. "Cry of the Worm Part 2: Path of Blood"; 6. "Cry of the Worm Part 3: Path of the Sword"
3	Dreamsong	February 10, 1999	978-1-56971-357-0
7. "Dreamsong Part 1"; 8. "Dreamsong Part 2"; 9. "Dreamsong Part 3"; 10. "Dreamsong Part 4"; 11. "Dreamsong Part 5"
4	On Silent Wings	August 25, 1999	978-1-56971-412-6
12. "Rin's Bane Part 1"; 13. "Rin's Bane Part 2"; 14. "On Silent Wings Part 1"; 15. "On Silent Wings Part 2"
5	On Silent Wings II	March 22, 2000	978-1-56971-444-7
16. "On Silent Wings Part 3"; 17. "On Silent Wings Part 4"; 18. "On Silent Wings Part 5"; 19. "On Silent Wings Part 6"; 20. "On Silent Wings Part 7"
6	Dark Shadows	September 27, 2000	978-1-56971-469-0
21. "Dark Shadows Part 1"; 22. "Dark Shadows Part 2"; 23. "Dark Shadows Part 3"; 24. "Food"
7	Heart of Darkness	April 18, 2001	978-1-56971-531-4
25. "Heart of Darkness Part 1"; 26. "Heart of Darkness Part 2"; 27. "Heart of Darkness Part 3"; 28. "Heart of Darkness Part 4"; 29. "Heart of Darkness Part 5"; 30. "Heart of Darkness Part 6"; 31. "Heart of Darkness Part 7"
8	The Gathering	August 22, 2001	978-1-56971-546-8
32. "Mongrel"; 33. "Storm Part 1"; 34. "Storm Part 2"; 35. "Stigma Part 1"; 36. "Stigma Part 2"; 37. "Comrades Part 1"; 38. "Comrades Part 2"; 39. "Comrades Part 3"
9	The Gathering II	December 19, 2001	978-1-56971-560-4
40. "Comrades Part 4"; 41. "Comrades Part 5"; 42. "Comrades Part 6"; 43. "Rage"; 44. "Cloudburst Part 1"; 45. "Cloudburst Part 2"
10	Secrets	June 12, 2002	978-1-56971-746-2
46. "Secrets Part 1"; 47. "Secrets Part 2"; 48. "Secrets Part 3"; 49. "Stigmata"; 50. "Husk"; 51. "Skin Part 1"; 52. "Skin Part 2"
11	Beasts	December 18, 2002	978-1-56971-741-7
53. "Beasts Part 1"; 54. "Beasts Part 2"; 55. "Beasts Part 3"; 56. "Beasts Part 4"; 57. "Beasts Part 5"
12	Autumn Frost	December 31, 2003	978-1-56971-991-6
58. "Autumn Frost Part 1"; 59. "Autumn Frost Part 2"; 60. "Autumn Frost Part 3"; 61. "Autumn Frost Part 4"; 62. "Autumn Frost Part 5"; 63. "Autumn Frost Part 6"; 64. "The Wind and the Heron"; 65. "Cherry Blossom"
13	Mirror of the Soul	August 18, 2004	978-1-59307-218-6
66. "Shadows"; 67. "Mourning Shadows"; 68. "Path of Shadows"; 69. "Thorns"; 70. "Mirror of the Soul Part 1"; 71. "Mirror of the Soul Part 2"; 72. "Mirror of the Soul Part 3"; 73. "Light and Shadow"; 74. "Crossroads"
14	Last Blood	June 1, 2005	978-1-59307-321-3
75. "Last Blood Part 1"; 76. "Last Blood Part 2"; 77. "Last Blood Part 3"; 78. "Last Blood Part 4"; 79. "Last Blood Part 5"; 80. "Confession"; 81. "Twilight Part 1"; 82. "Twilight Part 2"; 83. "Twilight Part 3"
15	Trickster	February 15, 2006	978-1-59307-468-5
84. "Trickster Part 1"; 85. "Trickster Part 2"; 86. "Trickster Part 3"; 87. "Trickster Part 4"; 88. "Trickster Part 5"; 89. "Pity"; 90. "Forsaken"; 91. "Duet"
16	Shortcut	January 3, 2007	978-1-59307-723-5
92. "Cauldron"; 93. "An Open Pit"; 94. "Shortcut Part 1"; 95. "Shortcut Part 2"; 96. "Shortcut Part 3"; 97. "Shortcut Part 4"; 98. "Shortcut Part 5"
17	On the Perfection of Anatomy	June 13, 2007	978-1-59307-782-2
99. "On the Perfection of Anatomy Part 1"; 100. "On the Perfection of Anatomy Part 2"; 101. "On the Perfection of Anatomy Part 3"; 102. "On the Perfection of Anatomy Part 4"; 103. "On the Perfection of Anatomy Part 5"; 104. "On the Perfection of Anatomy Part 6"
18	The Sparrow Net	February 6, 2008	978-1-59307-871-3
105. "The Sparrow Net Part 1"; 106. "The Sparrow Net Part 2"; 107. "The Sparrow Net Part 3"; 108. "The Sparrow Net Part 4"; 109. "Barefoot Part 1"; 110. "Barefoot Part 2"; 111. "Barefoot Part 3"; 112. "Barefoot Part 4"; 113. "Barefoot Part 5"
19	Badger Hole	June 11, 2008	978-1-59307-969-7
114. "Life or Death"; 115. "Badger Hole Part 1"; 116. "Badger Hole Part 2"; 117. "Badger Hole Part 3"; 118. "Badger Hole Part 4"
20	Demon Lair	December 10, 2008	978-1-59582-199-7
119. "Otter Holt Part 1"; 120. "Otter Holt Part 2"; 121. "Otter Holt Part 3"; 122. "Demon Lair Part 1"; 123. "Demon Lair Part 2"; 124. "Demon Lair Part 3"; 125. "Demon Lair Part 4"; 126. "Demon Lair Part 5"; 127. "Demon Lair Part 6"
21	Demon Lair II	July 15, 2009	978-1-59582-323-6
128. "Demon Lair Part 7"; 129. "Demon Lair Part 8"; 130. "Demon Lair Part 9"; 131. "Demon Lair Part 10"; 132. "Demon Lair Part 11"; 133. "Demon Lair Part 12"; 134. "On the Perfection of Anatomy Conclusion"
22	Footsteps	January 13, 2010	978-1-59582-443-1
135. "Footsteps"; 136. "Restless Ghosts"; 137. "Visitors Part 1"; 138. "Visitors Part 2"; 139. "Winter Snow"; 140. "Night Chrysanthemum"; 141. "Companion Part 1"
23	Scarlet Swords	January 26, 2011	978-1-59582-671-8
142. "Companion Part 2"; 143. "Culvert"; 144. "Power and Mist"; 145. "Crimson Snowflake"; 146. "Traces of the Heart"; 147. "Testing the Waters"; 148. "Scarlet Swords"
24	Massacre	October 26, 2011	978-1-59582-751-7
149. "Entangled"; 150. "White Sheet, Glowing Under the Moonlight"; 151. "Massacre Part 1"; 152. "Massacre Part 2"; 153. "Massacre Part 3"; 154. "Massacre Part 4"; 155. "Evasion"
25	Snowfall at Dawn	August 1, 2012	978-1-59582-883-5
156. "Snowfall at Dawn"; 157. "Snow, Like Blossoms"; 158. "Snow, Moon, Flowers"; 159. "Wind, Petals, Snow, Moon"; 160. "On the Perfection of Anatomy: The Untold Truth"; 161. "Blizzard Part 1"; 162. "Blizzard Part 2"
26	Blizzard	March 13, 2013	978-1-61655-098-1
163. "Blizzard Part 3"; 164. "Blizzard Part 4"; 165. "Blizzard Part 5"; 166. "Blizzard Part 6"; 167. "Blizzard Part 7"; 168. "Food: Reprise"; 169. "Wings, Without Wind"
27	Mist on the Spider's Web	September 11, 2013	978-1-61655-215-2
170. "Mist on the Spider's Web"; 171. "The Pots Part 1"; 172. "The Pots Part 2"; 173. "The Pots Part 3"; 174. "The Pots Part 4"; 175. "The Last Ten Part 1"; 176. "The Last Ten Part 2"; 177. "The Last Ten Part 3"
28	Raining Chaos	January 22, 2014	978-1-61655-321-0
178. "Raining Chaos Part 1"; 179. "Raining Chaos Part 2"; 180. "Raining Chaos Part 3"; 181. "Raining Chaos Part 4"; 182. "Sullied Snow Part 1"; 183. "Sullied Snow Part 2"; 184. "Raining Chaos Part 5"
29	Beyond Good and Evil	May 14, 2014	978-1-61655-337-1
185. "The Chosen Path Part 1"; 186. "The Chosen Path Part 2"; 187. "Rudderless Part 1"; 188. "Rudderless Part 2"; 189. "Soul Fire"; 190. "Heavenly Fire"; 191. "Beyond Good and Evil"
30	Vigilance	October 29, 2014	978-1-61655-484-2
192. "Kasha"; 193. "Vigilance Part 1"; 194. "Vigilance Part 2"; 195. "Vigilance Part 3"; 196. "One Hundred Dances Part 1"; 197. "One Hundred Dances Part 2"
31	Final Curtain	April 1, 2015	978-1-61655-626-6
198. "One Hundred Dances Part 3"; 199. "Glorious Death in Winter Thunder Part 1"; 200. "Glorious Death in Winter Thunder Part 2"; 201. "Blue Embracing Indigo"; 202. "Blade of Remorse"; 203. "Where Ferocious Winds Contest"; 204. "May I Ask About Death?"; 205. "In the Forgotten, Fluttering Snow"; 206. "Final Curtain: Manji and Rin"

== English Deluxe Edition volume list ==
No.	Volumes	Release date	ISBN
1	1–3	October 7, 2020	978-1-5067-2099-9
2	4–6	February 17, 2021	978-1-5067-2100-2
3	7–9	August 11, 2021	978-1-5067-2101-9
4	10–12	November 3, 2021	978-1-5067-2655-7
5	13–15	February 23, 2022	978-1-5067-2656-4
6	16–19	June 8, 2022	978-1-5067-2657-1
7	20–22	October 5, 2022	978-1-5067-2658-8
8	23–25	February 8, 2023	978-1-5067-3303-6
9	26–28	July 5, 2023	978-1-5067-3304-3
10	29–31	October 18, 2023	978-1-5067-3305-0

== Bakumatsu Arc volume list ==
No.	Release date	ISBN
1	October 23, 2019	978-4-06-517178-3
2	April 23, 2020	978-4-06-519085-2
3	October 23, 2020	978-4-06-521106-9
4	April 23, 2021	978-4-06-522910-1
5	October 21, 2021	978-4-06-525163-8
6	April 21, 2022	978-4-06-527420-0
7	October 21, 2022	978-4-06-529471-0
8	April 21, 2023	978-4-06-531371-8
9	November 22, 2023	978-4-06-533535-2
10	August 22, 2024	978-4-06-536498-7
