= Doll Girl =

Publication information
- Publisher: Quality Comics; DC Comics
- First appearance: (As Martha Roberts); Feature Comics #27 (December 1939) (As Doll Girl); Doll Man #37 (December 1951) (Unknown); Titans Secret Files #2 (October 2000)
- Created by: Will Eisner

In-story information
- Alter ego: Martha Roberts; Donna Caprese
- Species: Metahuman
- Team affiliations: Freedom Fighters
- Abilities: Size reduction; Peak-level strength; Combat experience; Piloting skills

Doll Girl is a superheroine from the Golden Age of Comics, originally published by Quality Comics and currently part of the DC Comics Universe of characters.

She first appeared as Martha Roberts in Feature Comics #27 (December 1939) and as Doll Girl in Doll Man #37 (December 1951). A new version later appeared in Titans Secret Files #2 (October 2000).

== Fictional character biography ==
=== Martha Roberts ===
Martha Roberts was the daughter of Professor Roberts, who tutored his young protégé Darrel Dane in his home laboratory. During the summer of 1939, Martha was being blackmailed by a criminal named Falco over love letters she had written one of her former college teachers. After imbibing a concoction, Dane found himself shrunk to the height of six inches, but with his normal strength intact. Martha sewed him new clothes to wear, and he began to worry that he might never be able to regain his normal height.

Martha Roberts debuts as Doll Girl in Doll Man #37.

After refusing to pay Falco any more blackmail money, Martha was kidnapped by Falco and rescued by the "doll man". Finding that through intense concentration Dane could affect his height, he decided to begin to fight crime as the Doll Man, often assisted by Martha (who also became his scientific research assistant).

Several years later, while wishing and concentrating about being able to shrink down to aid Doll Man, Darrel also was thinking about the same thing and suddenly, Martha's height and weight dwindled down until she was on the same scale as Doll Man. She began to team with Doll Man as Midge, the Doll Girl. She fights "the Skull, the Druids, the Count de Grasso, and the houngan Dr. Voodoo.

After Quality Comics went out of business in 1956, DC Comics acquired their superhero characters. Doll Man and several other former Quality properties were re-launched in Justice League of America #107 (October 1973) as the Freedom Fighters. As was done with many other characters DC had acquired from other publishers or that were holdovers from Golden Age titles, the Freedom Fighters were located on a parallel world, one called "Earth-X" where Nazi Germany had won World War II. The team were featured in their own series for fifteen issues (1976–1978), in which the team temporarily leaves Earth-X for Earth-One (where most DC titles were set). It was revealed during the Freedom Fighters series that Martha Roberts was now deceased on Earth-X, and Doll Man later encountered the Earth-One version of Roberts. The Earth-One Martha Roberts became a supporting character in the series and also guest-starred in Teen Titans #47 as a reporter.

The Earth-One Martha Roberts appears in Freedom Fighters #13.

Following the Crisis on Infinite Earths, a story that was intended to eliminate the similarly confusing histories that DC had attached to its characters by retroactively merging the various parallel worlds into one, Doll Girl's Earth-X and Earth-One days were erased and her histories were merged as one.

In Uncle Sam and the Freedom Fighters #4 (February 2008), it is revealed that Martha is deceased, killed by cancer. She was unable to get medical treatment because of her small size.

=== Titans Secret Files ===
A version of Doll Man and Doll Girl about whom little has been revealed briefly appeared in Titans Secret Files #2. This Doll Girl also had a cameo in Wonder Woman (vol. 2) #174.

== Powers and abilities ==
As Doll Girl, Martha can shrink through mental concentration to a height of 5 and 1/2 inches. She retained her full-size strength and is a fair unarmed combatant. She can also pilot the small "flying saucer" that the duo used and was able to use other small vehicles as needed.

== Other versions ==
In Kingdom Come, the Doll Man/Doll Girl franchise is represented by a female character named Living Doll, wearing the Doll Girl costume, and is seen sitting on Superman's shoulder acting as a sort of secretary for the Justice League. She is the daughter of the original Doll Man and Doll Girl.

Based on comments by Grant Morrison, the 52's Earth-10 universe is not the pre-Crisis Earth-X.
