= Ray (DC Comics) =

Four fictional characters in the DC Comics universe

The Ray
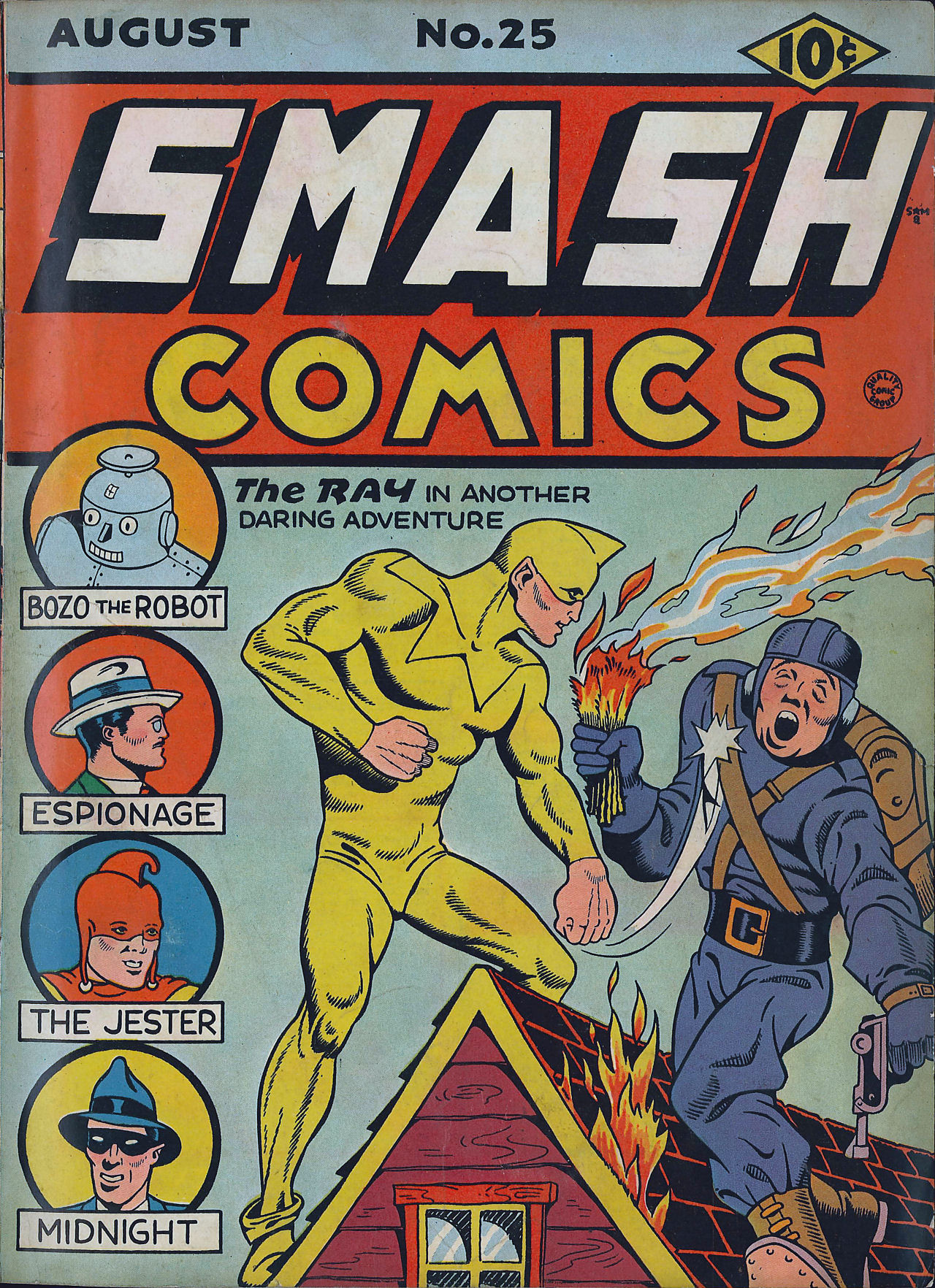
- The original Ray on the cover of Smash Comics #25 (Aug 1941), art by Gill Fox.

Publication information
- Publisher: DC Comics
- First appearance: (Happy); Smash Comics #14 (September 1940) (Raymond); The Ray #1 (February 1992) (Silver); DCU Brave New World (July 2006) (Gates); The Ray #1 (December 2011)
- Created by: (Happy); Lou Fine (Raymond); Jack C. Harris; Joe Quesada (Silver); Justin Gray; Jimmy Palmiotti; Daniel Acuña (Gates); Justin Gray; Jimmy Palmiotti; Jamal Igle

In-story information
- Alter ego: Langford "Happy" Terrill; Raymond Terrill; Stan Silver; Lucien Gates
- Team affiliations: (All); Freedom Fighters; Justice League (Happy); All-Star Squadron (Silver); S.H.A.D.E.
- Abilities: Light manipulation; Magnetism and electricity manipulation; Generation of light and solid light constructs; Conversion to energy form; Invisibility and illusion casting; Telepathic communication; Flight

The Ray is the name of four superheroes in American comic books published by DC Comics. All versions of the character have the superpower of manipulating visible light in some manner.

The first Ray was Langford "Happy" Terrill, a Quality Comics character. When DC Comics later purchased Quality Comics, Happy Terrill was retconned as a member of the Freedom Fighters on Earth-X. The character, created by artist Lou Fine, first appeared in Smash Comics #14 (Sept 1940) and continued in the book until issue #40 (Feb 1943).

Following DC altering much of its continuity and history in the storyline Crisis on Infinite Earths, Happy Terrill was now an inhabitant of the mainstream DC Comics universe and his son Ray Terrill became the second Ray. Later, the character Stan Silver briefly operated as the third hero called the Ray.

In 2011's New 52 relaunch of DC Comics, where fictional history was again restructured, a new character called Lucien Gates was introduced as the Ray. Although historically he is the fourth superhero character to use this name, in The Ray #1 (2012), set in a rebooted continuity, he refers to the origin of Happy Terrill as a story he had heard as a child.

== Fictional character biography ==
=== Langford "Happy" Terrill ===
Langford "Happy" Terrill as The Ray. Art by Jerry Ordway and Rick Hoberg.

Prior to the Crisis on Infinite Earths reboot, Langford "Happy" Terrill is originally described as having been exposed to lightning and sunlight at the same time while ballooning and gains energy-based superpowers. He is able to emit energy from his body and use it to fly through the air.

According to Jess Nevins' Encyclopedia of Golden Age Superheroes, "The Ray fights the Hindu mystic Bela Jat, Cadava the Crumbler, the Mongol warrior Khan, and the pied piper of crime, Stradivarius".

His Post-Crisis origin is more involved. Before World War II, the government established a secret group known as RONOL (Research on the Nature of Light). One RONOL member, Dr. Dayzl, theorized that the light that originated millennia ago where Earth now orbits would eventually circumnavigate the universe and return as a dangerous, conscious entity.

The only way to stop the "Light Entity", Dayzl believed, was to talk to it. Tricking a reporter named "Happy" Terrill into joining them, Dayzl and his assistants staged an upper atmosphere ballooning "accident", making certain Happy was exposed to a genetic "light bomb". Dayzl calculated that Happy's offspring would be a unification of human and light energy, a potential liaison to the Light Entity. Unaware of the truth, Happy used his resulting powers to become the superhero the Ray. Simultaneously, RONOL lost government backing due to Dayzl's unorthodox beliefs. Dayzl's fate remains unknown. In 1950, after learning the truth, Happy vowed to quit his Ray identity.

In February 1946, Happy Terrill and his first wife, Gayle, had a child named Joshua. For a time, Joshua accompanied the Ray on missions as his sidekick Spitfire. However, Joshua was prone to violent outbursts. After accidentally killing his mother in a fit of rage on his birthday in February 1954, Joshua was placed in suspended animation by his father, only to wake up again in the future, still only 8 years old.

After a brief association with his old team the Freedom Fighters in the 1970s, Happy Terrill married a woman named Nadine and settled down. Everything seemed normal until Happy saw his newborn son, Raymond, glowing with crackling energy in the hospital nursery. Happy was convinced Dayzl's theories were correct. He now knew his son would one day have the power to confront the Light Entity. Not wanting to put his wife through torment, Happy told her that the baby had died and then set up his son with a foster father (his brother Thomas).

In the 2008 Freedom Fighters series, Happy is asked by Uncle Sam to ask Neon the Unknown for help. When Neon, completely detached from humanity, refuses, Happy drinks from the waters of his oasis, becoming a new Neon the Unknown, known simply as "Neon".

=== Ray Terrill ===
Ray Terrill was told he was hypersensitive to light and exposure to sunlight would kill him. Privately tutored in his window-darkened home, Ray's most earnest wish was for normalcy. The media called him Night Boy. His only friend during his formative years was his neighbor, Jennifer Jurden. When he was 18, at his supposed father's deathbed, Ray learned his life was a lie. He was not allergic to light, nor did he have to live in darkness. Most disturbing of all, he discovered his true father was the 1940s war-time super-hero, the Golden Age Ray.

=== Stan Silver ===
Stan Silver as the Ray, art by Daniel Acuña.

The reformed Freedom Fighters have a member called the Ray who has similar powers to the Terrills. The new Ray is Stan Silver, and he was described by Justin Gray as being "capable of turning his body into a living laser light" and "the playboy of the group". Stan likes to show off in front of the media.

Working as a foreign correspondent for the Washington Sun, Silver was exposed to upper atmosphere radiation while covering a story, thus gaining power over various forms of light. Recruited by S.H.A.D.E., Silver begins using his powers in the service of his government. He is, however, something of a womanizing egomaniac in his civilian persona. Silver later defects from S.H.A.D.E. to join Uncle Sam's new group of Freedom Fighters.

In Uncle Sam and the Freedom Fighters #6, Silver reveals that he is a double agent still loyal to S.H.A.D.E. He turns on his teammates and kills the Invisible Hood. Immediately after, the colors of his "costume" were inverted, becoming blue instead of yellow.

In Uncle Sam and the Freedom Fighters #7, he battles his former teammates and is defeated by Ray Terrill, and is sent back to Father Time. He is later seen outside the White House with S.H.A.D.E.'s other super-soldiers, who join Father Time in the timestream after the battle ends.

=== Lucien Gates ===
In The New 52 rebooted DC's continuity launched in 2011, a character named Lucien Gates was introduced as the Ray in a miniseries titled The Ray, written by Palmiotti and Gray with art duties by Jamal Igle. It did not feature any of the previous incarnations of the Ray, but instead centered around a new character by the name of Lucien Gates. Remarks made by Lucien referencing Langford's origin and his use of the Ray title in his debut issue indicate that he is not the first hero to be called the Ray as far as the newly rebooted DC universe is concerned. The miniseries debuted in December that year.

Lucien Gates is a Korean-American San Diego County lifeguard who, while on duty, was caught in the path of a particle beam. The beam, accidentally fired from a solar energy cannon commissioned by an unnamed government agency, mutated a number of living organisms before striking Gates. The resulting energy transforms him into an energy manipulator, able to fly at superhuman speed, fire various energy beams, and create illusions. Gates is also a Korean-American adoptee.

Distinctively, Gates cannot direct his flight as is common for airborne superheroes, instead traveling in a straight line as a literal ray of light. To change direction, he must strike a reflective surface, though it does not appear he is bound by the normal mechanics of specular reflection and can "reflect" at any angle (perhaps more akin to a swimmer kicking off from the edge of a pool than true reflection). When necessary, he can reduce his speed and even hover.

== Powers and abilities ==
All versions of the Ray can absorb, store, and process pure light and use the energy to fly and create dazzlingly strong and powerful bursts of light. In his Golden Age appearances, Happy Terrill was able to manipulate other forms of energy such as electricity and magnetism.

The Terrills can control light externally to create illusions and even solid light constructs, as well as render themselves invisible.

Later in Happy's career (while mentoring/antagonizing his son), he was shown to have a greater mastery of his abilities. For example, by using "solid light vibrations", essentially resonating the target's inner ear, he was able to approximate telepathic communication.

Ray Terrill is capable of converting his body completely into light energy. No physical harm can come to him in this form.

Stan Silver's full abilities and powers are largely undocumented. As noted above, he is apparently "capable of turning his body into a living laser light".

Lucien Gates can not become immaterial; rather the light forms a protective armor. To fly, Gates bounces off of reflective surfaces. His thought processes calculate hundreds of options, allowing him to redirect his path at light speed.

== Other versions ==
- An alternate universe version of Ray makes a minor appearance in 52. This version is from Earth-10, a universe similar to Earth-X.
- The 2007 series Countdown: Arena introduces several alternate versions of the Ray. On Earth-6, the former Atom (Ray Palmer) has become his world's Ray, a Nazi Ray exists on "Earth-10" and his closest Earth-50 parallel is prominent Wildstorm Universe character Apollo. Ray's Freedom Fighters are supposed to be the opposition of the fascist JL-Axis (the fascist Ray's costume matches Ray Terril's new uniform), and Apollo is more commonly viewed as a parallel version of Superman (he is placed with the Rays apparently due to his light-based powers).
- A version of the Ray appears in Kingdom Come as one of the heroes loyal to Superman. He is also mentioned in being instrumental in stripping the radiation out of the Kansas soil both for the construction of the Gulag and Superman's reclamation of the land at the end of the story.
- New Super-Man, set in China of the mainstream DC Universe, features a character called the Sunbeam (a Chinese counterpart of the Ray).

== Reception ==
In American Comic Book Chronicles: 1940-1944, comics historian Kurt Mitchell writes that the Golden Age strip "showcased Fine's growing mastery of lighting effects, as well as the wild fight scenes and memorably ugly villains that had by now become trademarks of his style".

== In other media ==
=== Television ===
- The Ray Terrill incarnation of the Ray makes non-speaking background appearances in Justice League Unlimited as a member of the Justice League.
- The Langford Terrill incarnation of the Ray appears in the Batman: The Brave and the Bold episode "Cry Freedom Fighters!", voiced by Tom Kenny. This version is a member of the Freedom Fighters.

=== Arrowverse ===
The Ray Terrill incarnation of the Ray appears in the Arrowverse crossover event "Crisis on Earth-X" and the CW Seed animated series Freedom Fighters: The Ray along with an uncredited appearance in the crossover "Crisis on Infinite Earths", portrayed by Russell Tovey.

=== Film ===
The Ray Terrill incarnation of the Ray appears in Justice League: Crisis on Infinite Earths.

=== Miscellaneous ===
- The Langford and Ray Terrill incarnations of the Ray appear in issue #17 of the Justice League Unlimited tie-in comic. The former is a member of the Freedom Fighters.
- The Ray Terrill incarnation of the Ray makes background appearances in DC Super Hero Girls as a student of Super Hero High.
