= Nobunny =

American musician

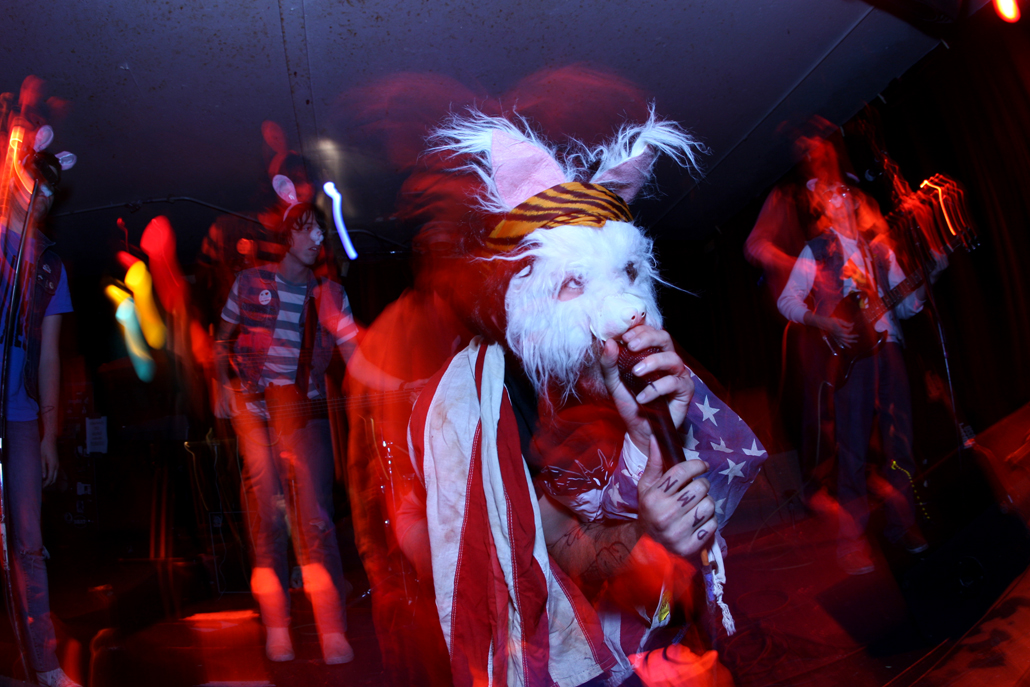

Background information
- Born: Justin Champlin
- Origin: Tucson, Arizona, U.S.
- Genres: Rock; garage rock; garage punk; punk rock; power pop
- Occupation: Musician
- Instruments: Vocals; guitar; bass guitar; piano; keyboards; drums; percussion
- Years active: 2001–2020
- Labels: Bubbledumb; In-Fi; Slovenly; Bachelor; Almost Ready; 1-2-3-4 Go!; HoZac; Burger; Third Man; Goner; People in a Position to Know; Douchemaster
- Member of: The Okmoniks; The Sneaky Pinks
- Formerly of: Hunx and His Punx

Nobunny was the stage persona of musician Justin Champlin, performing under the moniker since 2001. His debut LP, Love Visions, was home recorded and released in 2008 on Bubbledumb Records to positive reviews. It was re-released with 1-2-3-4 Go! Records in 2009 along with a second album, Raw Romance, released by Burger Records. His second official LP, First Blood, was released by Goner Records in September 2010. His last LP, Secret Songs, was released on Goner Records towards the end of 2013.

== Biography ==
While on stage, Nobunny dresses (and undresses) in a bunny mask that is often accompanied by other odd stage-attire choices, such as raw meat, weaves, ball gags, firecrackers, panties, knee pads and coats made of trash. Nobunny released a vinyl single, "Give it to Me", on HoZac Records and a full-length LP, Love Visions, on Bubbledumb Records in 2008. Love Visions was later re-released on 1-2-3-4 Go! Records in 2009 on vinyl and CD. Since the release of his debut LP, Nobunny has been featured in multiple magazines nationwide and has developed a solid fan base across the world. Burger Records released Raw Romance in 2009 on cassette only. Raw Romance contains a few alternate recordings of previous works and several new songs. The initial release was limited to 500 hand-numbered copies on white or blue cassette tapes. It has subsequently been pressed on vinyl and CD. Burger Records has also issued the Love Visions album on cassette twice: once as Love Visions, and once as a split cassette featuring both Love Visions and Raw Romance. Burger Records is also scheduled to put out First Blood on tape and donate the profits to charity.

Nobunny played at Third Man Records in Nashville, Tennessee on May 21, 2010, in a live concert that was recorded to analogue tape and released on vinyl by Third Man Records. On September 21, 2010, Goner Records released Nobunny's official second LP First Blood.

In July 2020, following allegations of sexual abuse and manipulation of underage girls raised against other Burger Records alumni, Nobunny released a statement admitting to using his position in the industry to taking advantage of teenage girls. In this statement, he announced the end of the Nobunny project and his retirement from music.

== Style ==
Nobunny is known for mixing lo-fi garage punk with bubblegum pop and power pop. He has named The Ramones, Hasil Adkins and The Cramps as being influences on his music.

== Discography ==
=== As Nobunny ===
- Live On TV!!! VHS (Not On Label)
- Nobunny And His Fabulous Flys CDr (Solid Gold Records)
- Nobunny Cares CDR (Slash Records)
- World's Lousy With Ideas Vol. 3 7-inch single (Almost Ready Records; contributes the song "Hippy Witch")
- Love Visions LP/CD (1-2-3-4 Go! Records; previously issued by Bubbledumb Records on vinyl only)
- Live Love! CDR (1-2-3-4 Go! Records)
- Love Visions cassette (Burger Records)
- Raw Romance cassette/CD/LP (Burger Records)
- Leap Frog Vol. 2 cassette (Scotch Tapes)
- Motorhead With Me/Give It to Me 7-inch single (Hozac Records)
- Love Visions/Raw Romance split cassette (Burger Records)
- Live at Third Man LP (Third Man Records)
- Brace Face 7-inch EP (Douchemaster Records)
- First Blood LP/CD (Goner Records)
- The Cramps Tribute DVD (self-released)
- Nobunny/Jacuzzi Boys 7-inch single (Scion A/V)
- La La La La Love You 7-inch single (Suicide Squeeze)
- The MaximumRockNRoll EP 7-inch EP (Goner Records)
- Love Visions cassette/LP/CD/six 7-inch box set (Almost Ready Records)
- Secret Songs LP/CD (Goner Records)
- Le Sacre Du Nobunny "Motorhead Mit Mir" (En Allemand) 7-inch single (Red Lounge Records)
- Nightmare Night VHS (Too Hot For TV)
- Trash Like Me 7-inch flexi-disc (Black Hole)
- Singlez And Loosies LP cassette (Rubber Vomit Records + Tripp Tapes)

=== As Justin Champlin ===
- The Okmoniks Compact 33-7 7-inch EP (In-Fi Records) (as part of The Okmoniks)
- Party Fever!!! LP/CD (Slovenly Recordings) (as part of The Okmoniks)
- "I Can't Wait" 7-inch single (Almost Ready Records; previously issued by 1-2-3-4 Go! and Rubber Vomit Records) (as part of the Sneaky Pinks)
- "Loner With a Boner" 7-inch single (Bachelor Records) (as part of the Sneaky Pinks)
- "I'm Punk" 7-inch single (Almost Ready Records) (as part of the Sneaky Pinks)
- Bland Canyon Adventure 10-inch EP (People in a Position to Know) (as part of Golden Boots)
