= First Blood (Nobunny album) =

Studio album by Nobunny
- Released: September 21, 2010
- Genre: Garage rock, bubblegum pop, punk rock, power pop, indie rock
- Length: 26:00
- Label: Goner Records

Professional ratings
Review scores
| Source | Rating |
|---|---|
| KEXP | (Favorable) |
| Punknews.org | (3.5/5) |
| KLYAM | (A) |

First Blood is Nobunny's second full-length album, released on September 21, 2010 on Goner Records. All songs written by Justin Champlin. Drummer and guitarist Jason "Elvis Christ" Testasecca recorded and mixed the album. The album's quality production is a departure from the lo-fi, home recording of Nobunny's debut LP Love Visions. First Blood is a continuation of Love Visions' themes of sexual desire, loneliness, and carpe diem.

== Track listing ==
1. "Ain't It A Shame" - 2:00
2. "(Do The) Fuck Yourself" - 1:24
3. "Blow Dumb" - 2:30
4. "Gone For Good" - 1:50
5. "Pretty Please Me - 1:35
6. "Breathe" - 3:09
7. "Live It Up" - 2:22
8. "Motorhead With Me" - 2:29
9. "Never Been Kissed" - 1:46
10. "Pretty Little Trouble" - 2:10
11. "I Was On (The Bozo Show)" - 3:16
