= List of government agencies in DC Comics =

The following is a list of fictional government agencies, comic book organizations that have been published by DC Comics and their imprints.

== A ==
=== Agency ===
The Agency is an organization that was formed by Amanda Waller to serve as a small, quasi-independent branch of Task Force X. It performed global operations which were vital to the security of American interests. Valentina Vostok brought former NYPD Lieutenant Harry Stein into the Agency as an operative. Adrian Chase and Peacemaker are contract operatives for the Agency.

==== Agency in other media ====
The Agency appears in Batman: The Enemy Within, led by Amanda Waller and consisting of Iman Avesta, Vernon Blake, Mario Fernandez, Roger Harrison, and an assortment of other unnamed agents.

=== A.P.E.S. ===
A.P.E.S. (All-Purpose Enforcement Squad) is a semi-independent U.S. governmental division within the D.E.O., possessing government IDs for multiple agencies ranging from the FBI to Scotland Yard and SMERSH; an agent has described the organisation as possessing more clearance than God. Donald Fite, father of Anita Fite / Empress, and Ishito Maad are their most well-known operatives. Their main headquarters is inside Mount Rushmore.

=== Argent ===
Argent is the domestic branch of Task Force X and a sister organization to the Suicide Squad. Argent is led by Control and consisted mainly of former OSS (Office of Strategic Services) agents. Argent was a powerful agency during most of the Cold War. After confronting and killing a government official responsible for the assassination of John F. Kennedy, Control ordered all records of Argent destroyed and pulled the organization undercover. For years, Argent continued work in secret, but shrunk considerably in size. Eventually, Control died, but his granddaughter, Anne-Marie Vere, pretended that he was still alive to keep the group operating. In the present day, a confrontation with the Suicide Squad exposes the deception and Argent disbands. Known agents of Argent include Control, Falcon, Fleur, Iron Munro, Phantom Lady, and Anne-Marie Vere.

=== A.S.A. ===
The A.S.A. (American Security Agency) is a U.S. government organization that supervised the creation of the Force of July. The chairman of the A.S.A. was B. Eric Blairman. Blairman is later replaced as head of the A.S.A. by Abraham Lincoln Carlyle, who attempted to use Psycho-Pirate's Medusa Mask to get himself elected president. During an internecine war within the U.S. government called the Janus Directive, Carlyle and most of the Force of July are killed in battle. The American Security Agency is made defunct shortly afterwards.

==== A.S.A. in other media ====
A variation of the A.S.A. appears in Black Lightning, consisting of Peter Gambi, Gardner Grayle, Kara Fowdy, Martin Proctor, Percy Odell, Carson Williams, and Sara Grey.

== B ==
=== B.A.A. ===
The B.A.A. (Bureau of Amplified Animals) is a U.S. government agency that monitors and deploys enhanced animal super-operatives. Operatives of the Bureau are Rex the Wonder Dog and Detective Chimp.

=== Bureau of Normalcy ===
The Bureau of Normalcy, formerly the Bureau of Oddities, is an organization dedicated to the weaponization or eradication of entities they deem to be odd. It was introduced in the television series Doom Patrol and based on the Men from N.O.W.H.E.R.E. from the Doom Patrol comics.

== C ==
=== C.B.I. ===
The C.B.I. (Central Bureau of Intelligence) was formerly led by Sarge Steel and also included Danny Chase and his parents, King Faraday, Richard Dragon, and Ben Turner in its stable of agents. Steel is eventually depicted as a Federal Cabinet Secretary of Metahuman Affairs (giving him control of agencies such as the Suicide Squad), until the election of Lex Luthor as president. Luthor appoints Amanda Waller as his replacement until he is exposed as a criminal.

=== Civil Defense Administration ===
The Civil Defense Administration is a U.S. intelligence agency created as a replacement for International Operations. It is led by Ivana Baiul.

=== C.E.M.A. ===
C.E.M.A. (Cosmic Emergency Management Agency) is an interstellar organization tasked to help the survivors of cosmic disasters such as planet-eating monsters.

== D ==
=== Département Gamma ===
Département Gamma is the main French covert ops organization in the DC Comics universe. Known operatives are Andre Chevard (Boy Commandos) founder and leader, Fleur-de-Lis (Global Guardians), Belphegor (Global Guardians), Tin, the Captain, the Professor, and Halfwolf.

=== Department PSI ===
Department PSI (Department for Paranormal Science Investigations) is a rival organization to the International Operations and employer of the superhero team Wildcore. Its director is Antonio Giovanni. When International Operations is dissolved, Department PSI absorbs most of its assets, equipment, and personnel.

=== D.S.I. ===
The D.S.I. (Department of Scientific Investigation) is a government organization dedicated to the investigation of strange phenomena. Known operatives were Darwin Jones, the chief of staff, and Tommy Dane, one of the Young Scienceers.

== E ==
=== E.A.G.L.E. ===
E.A.G.L.E. (Extranormal Activities Garrison for Law Enforcement) is a government agency within the Astro City universe. They are described to normally function as a sort of "clean up crew" for the superheroes ("taking supervillains into custody, guarding damaged property, etc."), but during the Confession storyline they are seen hunting down, and capturing, various superheroes. After the storyline, it is implied that they returned to their normal duties.

== F ==
=== FDAA ===
Introduced in the series The American Way, the FDAA (Federal Disaster Assistance Administration) handles a U.S. government superhero team called the Civil Defense Corps. The FDAA is responsible for using gene therapy to create many of America's heroes as well as "villains" who they have fight the heroes in publicly staged battles. The FDAA periodically unleashes Hellbent, a homicidal and sociopathic supervillain, to assassinate enemies of the United States.

=== Finger, Eye, and Ear ===
The Finger (secret police), the Eye (CCTV monitoring), and the Ear (phone surveillance) are the three branches of overt government surveillance in the dystopian Britain of V for Vendetta.

== G ==
=== G.E.O.R.G.E. ===
G.E.O.R.G.E. (Group for Extermination of Organizations of Revenge, Greed, and Evil) debuted in Blackhawk #228, during that title's attempt to mainstream the Blackhawks as superheroes. G.E.O.R.G.E. opposed the International Crime Combine, a supraorganization made up of operatives from various other criminal organizations some based in the DC Comics Universe, like CYCLOPS and O.G.R.E., and other organizations such as THRUSH and SPECTRE. Known G.E.O.R.G.E. operatives were their leader the Long L, Mister Delta, and the Champ, a trenchcoat-wearing robot.

=== G.O.O.D. ===
G.O.O.D. (Global Organization of Organized Defense) is an international organization. Its operatives include director Barney Ling and field operatives Ben Turner and Richard Dragon.

== I ==
=== International Operations ===
Internal Operations (I.O., IO or I/O) is a fictional U.S. intelligence agency in WildStorm comics. It was originally called International Operations. I.O. (International Operations) was founded in 1964 as a branch of the CIA with the mission to safeguard the United States' interests and safety abroad. It quickly became an independent agency under the leadership of Director Miles Craven. Following the Divine Right incident, the agency was severely weakened. It was shut down by the U.S. government within a year, but in 2004, it was reestablished under the leadership of John Lynch. IO first appeared in WildC.A.T.S. #1 (August 1992) and was created by Brandon Choi and Jim Lee.

== K ==
=== Knightwatch ===
Knightwatch is the military arm of the D.E.O. Knightwatch operatives wore armor resembling the suits worn by Checkmate agents.

==== Knightwatch in other media ====
Knightwatch appears in the seventh season of Arrow. In flash-forwards set in 2040, Connor Hawke is an agent of Knightwatch, who are described as a "good version of A.R.G.U.S."

== L ==
=== LexCorp ===
LexCorp is a government position run by President Lex Luthor.

=== LuthorCorp ===
LuthorCorp is a corporation run by Lex Luthor's father Lionel Luthor in Smallville. One of its bases is based in Smallville, LuthorCorp Fertilizer Plant No. 3 which has underground labs holding secret research into genetically modifying living organisms using meteor rocks with the company's slogan being "We make things grow". Years later, Lex bought the company after he killed Lionel and inherited all of his money.

== P ==
=== Project Atom ===
Project Atom is a U.S. government initiative masterminded by General Wade Eiling and lead scientist Heinrich Megala with the aim of creating a superhero answerable only to the military. The project used a combination of nuclear physics and a unique alloy called Dilustel with quantum properties that was cut from the skin of a captured alien known as the Silver Shield using X-Ionizer technology. The project had only two recorded successes, Captain Atom and Major Force. Megala was also responsible for creating the X-Ionizer technology, which is capable of cutting Captain Atom's skin.

=== Project 7734 ===
Project 7734 is a secret U.S. military black-ops facility commanded by General Sam Lane. Its existence was uncovered by investigative reporter James Olsen's investigations. Like the Human Defense Corps, and Squad K, this project was created to defend humanity against extraterrestrial threats, including Kryptonians. The number of the project itself is a play on a word that can be created on most calculators by simply typing in the number 7734 - turned upside down, it resembles the word "Hell".

=== Project Peacemaker ===
Project Peacemaker is a U.S. government division that was tasked with handling Peacemaker's interaction with other government agencies. After the so-called "Janus Directive", the Project became part of Checkmate and placed under the supervision of the CBI and Sarge Steel.

== Q ==
=== Quorum ===
The Quorum is the clandestine and apparently corrupt department of an unnamed government agency in the DC Comics Universe. Former operatives are Major Force, Mace Gardner (brother of Guy Gardner), Loria a New Blood, the metahuman Sledge, and an army of armored men known as Sweepers. The Quorum sponsored and funded the Blood Pack, a superhero team made up of "New Bloods", in a failed attempt to create a superhuman army based on their DNA.

== R ==
=== Red Shadow ===
Red Shadow is the Russian version of Task Force X. The organization originally consisted of ex-members of the People's Heroes and the Blue Trinity. Later on, other original Russian characters were introduced such as Stalnoivolk, Russia's World War II version of Superman. The Red Shadow operatives were all organized under Amanda Waller's opposite number, a man known only as Major Zastrow. Other Red Shadow operatives were: Pozhar (converts matter into energy), Bolshoi (martial artist), Molotov (explosives expert), Mrs. Gradenko (a were-bear), Yerosha (could alter a person's senses), Lamia (pheromone manipulation), the Blue Trinity (speedsters), and Schreck (a vampiric metahuman).

=== RONOL ===
RONOL (for Research on the Nature of Light) is a pre-World War II agency theorized that the light that originated millennia ago where Earth now orbits would eventually circumnavigate the universe and return as a dangerous, conscious entity. The project leader, Dr. Dayzl, tricked a reporter named Langford "Happy" Terrill into a ballooning accident where a "genetic light bomb" gave Terrill superpowers, abilities he would use to become the Ray. Eventually, Dayzl's unorthodox actions and beliefs came to light and the government terminated the RONOL program.

== S ==
=== S.H.A.D.E. ===
S.H.A.D.E. (Super Human Advanced Defense Executive) is a fictional U.S. military organization that investigates, assesses, and contains paranormal and superhuman activity. Father Time and his S.H.A.D.E. agency exercise martial law over the devastated city of Blüdhaven. Father Time used this posting to carry out S.H.A.D.E.'s other mandate, the harvesting and creation of new metahuman talent. S.H.A.D.E. uses its specially trained metahuman talent to carry out black ops assassinations of threats to the United States and its policies. Several S.H.A.D.E. operatives defect from the organization to form a new version of the Freedom Fighters under the guidance of Uncle Sam, resulting in Sam and his team being declared enemies of S.H.A.D.E., and Father Time and his ally Gonzo the Mechanical Bastard ordering their deaths at the hands of First Strike (see Uncle Sam and the Freedom Fighters). After Father Time turned on Gonzo, he and his troops vanished into the timestream; Uncle Sam and the Freedom Fighters were then made the leaders of S.H.A.D.E.

A new version of S.H.A.D.E. is introduced in the series Frankenstein, Agent of S.H.A.D.E., consisting of Father Time, Frankenstein, Nina Mazursky, the Bride, Khalis, Vincent Velcro, and Warren Griffith.

=== Spyral ===
Spyral (also known as "Second Hand") is a U.N sanctioned international agency, was founded by the German superspy Otto Netz, known as Doctor Dedalus. Spyral specializes in mind erosion, brainwashing, and misdirection. In response to the escalating war between Batman Incorporated and Leviathan, the UN decided to reform Spyral, recruiting Dedalus' daughter Kathy Webb-Kane as leader. Dick Grayson and Helena Bertinelli later joined Spyral.

=== Squad K ===
Squad K is a special response team tasked with apprehending Superman if he should ever turn rogue, and with the apprehension of other Kryptonian criminals. Perseus Hazard, the grandson of Ulysses Hazard, was the group's first commander; after his death, he was replaced by Sergeant Cloud.

=== S.T.O.R.M. ===
S.T.O.R.M. is the agency employing John Stone. It is a tribute to S.H.I.E.L.D. and a precursor to Stormwatch. It appears in the pages of Planetary.

=== Syndicate ===
The Syndicate, led by King Faraday, is a neutral council of experts in the intelligence field considered the world's greatest spies and maintain order between other intelligence agencies. Their base of operations appears to be a safehouse in São Paulo, Brazil. The team appeared in the pages of Grayson.

== T ==
=== Task Force Delta ===
Task Force Delta is a blanket organization that helps to oversee smaller U.S. government covert agencies such as Knightwatch.

=== Task Force X ===
The OSS was dissolved in October 1945 and replaced in 1946 by the CIA. In 1951, seeking to fill the void left by the retired Justice Society of America, President Harry S. Truman created Task Force X. The Task Force had a military and a civilian branch. The military branch called the Suicide Squad was put under the command by General J.E.B. Stuart, who was later succeeded by Rick Flag. The civilian branch called Argent was headed by a former OSS chief known only as Control. Many years later, it was revealed through a conflict with Amanda Waller's Suicide Squad that Control had died and his granddaughter was covertly leading the now-small underground organization.

==== Task Force X in other media ====
Task Force X appears in My Adventures with Superman, led by Amanda Waller and General Sam Lane, and consisting of Agent Slade Wilson as a high-ranking agent, Ethan Avery and Joseph Martin as agents, and robotic OMAC foot soldiers. This version of the organization was formed by the General and Waller after they survived "Zero Day", during which they were attacked by a Kryptonian army that killed their comrades before the army was forced to retreat, leaving their technology behind. Under Checkmate's supervision, the pair subsequently salvaged it for themselves, founded Task Force X for fear of a second alien invasion, established Project Cadmus as a research branch, and investigate Superman's activities due to him possessing similar powers as the Kryptonian army. In the second season, the organization is led solely by Waller.

=== Task Force Z ===
A spin-off of the Suicide Squad, this team of zombified or undead agents was recruited by Two-Face and led by Jason Todd.

== U ==
=== Université Notre Dame des Ombres ===
Université Notre Dame des Ombres (Our Lady of the Shadows University) was originally created to train OSS agents during World War II. Today, it is a N.A.T.O.-sponsored covert intelligence training academy situated on the French Riviera, with an embassy office in Washington D.C. Its last known headmistress was Sandra Knight, the original Phantom Lady. The school's most notable graduates are the Crimson Fox twins and Dee Tyler, the second Phantom Lady.

== W ==
=== World Army ===
In 2011, DC Comics rebooted the continuity of its books in an initiative called The New 52. On Earth 2, the World Army is a global military organization that was created to support the Wonders of the World. Its known members are Amar Khan, Sonia Sato, Sam Lane, Robert Crane, and Stormy Foster. The World Army was organized after Earth 2's Superman, Wonder Woman, and Batman sacrificed their lives to fight off the invasion from Apokolips. They proceed to recruit or form alliances with superpowered individuals to prepare for the next attack from Apokolips.

== See also ==
- List of government agencies in comics
- List of government agencies in Marvel Comics
- List of criminal organizations in DC Comics
- List of teams and organizations in DC Comics
