= Love Visions =

Studio album by Nobunny
- Released: November 25, 2008
- Genre: Garage rock, punk rock, power pop, lo-fi
- Length: 22:50
- Label: Bubbledumb; 1-2-3-4 Go! Records

Nobunny chronology
Love Visions (2008)	Raw Romance (2009)

Love Visions is Nobunny's debut LP album, released in 2008. All the songs were written by Justin Champlin except for "Somewhere New," written by The Yolks.

== Production ==
Champlin recorded the album at home, playing the majority of the instruments himself.

== Artwork ==
The cover is an homage to the Ramones' debut album.

== Critical reception ==
Professional ratings
Review scores
Source	Rating
Now	4/5
Punknews.org	3.5/5 stars

PopMatters called the album "a quick and dirty blast of lo-fi garage rock that would feel right at home on both a Nuggets compilation and a late-70s NYC punk club." AllMusic called it "both undeniably catchy and just a little strange--power pop confection colliding with psycho-trash style." Tiny Mix Tapes called it "stripped-bare, no-frills garage punk." SF Weekly declared it "a sonic wad of doo-wop and bubblegum-punk-pop that's smashed up and oozing for a rechew somewhere beneath an autoshop desk in Rock 'n' Roll High School."

== Track listing ==
1. "Nobunny Loves You"
2. "I Know I Know"
3. "Mess Me Up"
4. "I Am A Girlfriend"
5. "Tina Goes To Work"
6. "Chuck Berry Holiday"
7. "Boneyard"
8. "Somewhere New"
9. "Church Mouse"
10. "It's True"
11. "Don't Know Don't Care"
12. "Not That Good"
