= Father Time (DC Comics) =

Publication information
- Publisher: DC Comics
- First appearance: Seven Soldiers: Frankenstein #3 (April 2006)
- Created by: Grant Morrison (writer); Doug Mahnke (artist)

In-story information
- Species: Metahuman
- Team affiliations: S.H.A.D.E.
- Abilities: Immortality; Enhanced strength Invulnerability

Father Time is a supervillain in publications from DC Comics. The character first appeared in Seven Soldiers: Frankenstein #3 (April 2006), and was created by Grant Morrison and Doug Mahnke.

== Fictional character biography ==
Father Time is the commander of the Super Human Advanced Defense Executive (S.H.A.D.E.), a Patriot Act-funded covert operations group that employs metahumans to combat terrorism. His own concerns appear to have at least as much to do with consolidating power as with national security. He assassinates a presidential candidate applying too much scrutiny on S.H.A.D.E., and replaces him with a double, Gonzo the Mechanical Bastard.

Father Time first appeared in Grant Morrison's Seven Soldiers of Victory: Frankenstein #3, temporarily pressing the undead assassin into S.H.A.D.E. service. During the World War III storyline, Time and S.H.A.D.E. try to stop the rampaging Black Adam, and Adam rips off Time's face. Time is hospitalized, then metamorphoses into a new form.

Father Time is reborn in a new body on New Year's Day to accompany the new year. In Frankenstein, he appears as a young black man wearing a costume resembling the Spirit's, but wearing a bowler hat. The Father Time shown in Freedom Fighters is an elderly man with long hair and a beard. In September 2011, The New 52 rebooted DC's continuity and Father Time still exists in this new timeline, first seen with the appearance of an elementary-age Japanese girl wearing a domino mask.

For most of the Uncle Sam and the Freedom Fighters series, Father Time is depicted as a villain. It is later revealed that he knew the danger Gonzo posed all along, and assembled the new members of the Freedom Fighters to bring Uncle Sam forth, make his new team heroes in the public eye, and defeat Gonzo.

== Powers and abilities ==
Father Time possesses invulnerability and enhanced strength to nigh-superhuman levels, enough to engage the Atomic Knights in battle. At the beginning of each year, he regenerates and takes on a new appearance. In The New 52, Father Time instead regenerates every decade.
