= Uncle Sam (comics) =

Comic book character based on the mascot

- Promotional artwork from DCU Brave New World #1 (August 2006) by Daniel Acuña.

Publication information
- Publisher: Quality Comics (1940–1944); DC Comics (1973–present)
- First appearance: National Comics #1 (July 1940)
- Created by: Will Eisner (writer/artist)

In-story information
- Team affiliations: Freedom Fighters; All-Star Squadron; S.H.A.D.E. Council of Immortals
- Notable aliases: Spirit of America, Minuteman, Brother Jonathan, Johnny Reb, Billy Yank, Patriot, Taylor Samuel Hawke, Samuel Augustus Adams, Samuel Wilson
- Abilities: Superhuman strength Enhanced speed Invulnerability; Limited clairvoyance Size alteration Ability to transport himself and others to The Heartland

Uncle Sam is a superhero appearing in American comic books published by DC Comics. Based on the national personification of the United States, Uncle Sam, the character first appeared in National Comics #1 (July 1940) and was created by Will Eisner.

== Publication history ==
=== Quality Comics ===
National Comics #3 (September 1940). Cover art by Lou Fine.

Uncle Sam first appeared in National Comics #1 (July 1940), which was published by Quality Comics during the Golden Age of Comic Books. He is depicted as a mystical being who was originally the spirit of a slain patriotic soldier from the American Revolutionary War and appears whenever his country needs him. The character was used for a few years from 1940 to 1944, briefly receiving a solo series, Uncle Sam Quarterly. During this time, he had a sidekick named Buddy Smith.

According to Jess Nevins' Encyclopedia of Golden Age Superheroes, "he fights a variety of Axis agents, human and superhuman, from the Black Legion to the shrink-ray-wielding Professor Nakajima. Uncle Sam also fights the mad scientist Dr. Dirge, the King Killer, and the insanity-causing Mad Poet".

=== DC Comics ===
DC Comics acquired the character as part of its acquisition of the Quality characters in the 1950s, and he was used as a supporting character in Justice League of America in the 1970s. This established Uncle Sam as the leader of the Freedom Fighters, a team of former Quality characters that briefly received its own title. This team was initially based on a parallel world called Earth-X, where World War II had lasted into the 1970s.

Uncle Sam's origin was rewritten in The Spectre, where Sam is described as a spiritual entity created through an occult ritual by the Founding Fathers. This "Spirit of America" was initially bound to a talisman and would take physical form by merging with a dying patriot. The new origin states that the Spirit of America had taken human form as the Minute-Man during the Revolutionary War and Brother Jonathan in later conflicts. During the American Civil War, the Spirit of America was split in two and became Johnny Reb and Billy Yank.

The Spirit first assumed its now-familiar Uncle Sam incarnation in 1870, when it resurrected a political cartoonist who had been killed by Boss Tweed. The second host of Uncle Sam fought in World War I. A third (the character's Golden Age incarnation) was a superhero during World War II but vanished at the end of the war, erasing any subsequent appearances from the fictional history of the DC Universe (although most of them had already been erased by the Crisis on Infinite Earths). In The Spectre, the Spirit is resurrected in a new costumed form called the Patriot, but later reverts to Uncle Sam in a Superman issue.

A 1997 Vertigo series features the character with the persona of a street person. A similar notion was suggested by Alan Moore in his 1980s crossover proposal Twilight of the Superheroes; this interpretation was inspired by the satirical novel The Public Burning by Robert Coover, which also features a superheroic version of Uncle Sam.

In Infinite Crisis, the Freedom Fighters are attacked by the Secret Society of Super Villains. Three of the Freedom Fighters, Human Bomb, Phantom Lady, and Black Condor are killed in the battle. Uncle Sam himself seemingly dies at the hands of Sinestro.

The character's latest incarnation appeared in the first issue of Uncle Sam and the Freedom Fighters, and spends the first few issues of this new series attempting to form a new version of the Freedom Fighters. This new Uncle Sam emerges from the Mississippi River at the same time as Father Time is elsewhere planning the future of S.H.A.D.E. with new incarnations of the Freedom Fighters members. Uncle Sam, disturbed by the deadly force used by the new versions of Phantom Lady, Human Bomb, Doll Man, and others, successfully recruits these metahumans into his new Freedom Fighters team, which results in Father Time ordering his remaining S.H.A.D.E. personnel to pursue and kill Uncle Sam and his team.

In The New 52 rebooted DC's continuity, a human African-American version appears in the comic series Human Bomb. One of the S.H.A.D.E leaders he calls delivers an order to capture Michael Taylor.

== Powers and abilities ==
Uncle Sam has demonstrated various powers, including super strength, invulnerability, the ability to alter his size, enhanced speed, and some degree of clairvoyance. He is also shown to be able to transport himself and others to a pocket dimension called The Heartland and travel between universes. Furthermore, Sam's abilities are dependent on the United States' patriotism.

== Other versions ==
- In 1998, DC published under its adult imprint Vertigo a two-issue prestige format comic series, Uncle Sam. It was written by Steve Darnall with painted artwork by Alex Ross. Uncle Sam is depicted as a ragged old man who is tormented by visions of historical episodes and modern aspects of the United States at its worst. He is forced to battle a dark doppelganger of himself based on corruption, deceit, and oppression, with the identity of the United States at stake.
- In an alternate DC timeline appearing in Superman/Batman, Superman and Batman have been raised by Cosmic King, Lightning Lord, and Saturn Queen, the three original members of the Legion of Super-Villains, and have turned the Earth into a totalitarian state. Uncle Sam becomes Green Lantern when Wonder Woman gives him Abin Sur's ring, as Hal Jordan is dead in this reality. When Wonder Woman first encounters this Uncle Sam, he is visually similar to the Uncle Sam from Alex Ross' miniseries; once she uses her magic lasso to reveal the truth to him, he reverts to his classic persona and costume.
- An alternate universe version of Uncle Sam makes a minor appearance in 52. This version is from Earth-10, a universe similar to Earth-X.
- On Earth-11, a world of reversed genders, a female version of Sam named Columbia leads the Freedom Fighters.
- New Super-Man features a character, Flying Dragon General, as an analog of Uncle Sam.

== In other media ==
- Uncle Sam appears in the Batman: The Brave and the Bold episode "Cry Freedom Fighters!", voiced by Peter Renaday.
- Uncle Sam appears as a character summon in Scribblenauts Unmasked: A DC Comics Adventure.
- Uncle Sam appears in Justice League: Crisis on Infinite Earths.
- Uncle Sam appears in Justice League Unlimited #17.

== Analysis ==
The comic character, just like the original poster image it was based on (designed by James Montgomery Flagg for World War I recruitment), served as United States propaganda, although due to the necessity of embedding him in the story, it was less explicit and more complex.
