= Equus (character) =

- Cover of Superman (vol. 2) #206, Equus' first appearance. Art by Jim Lee and Scott Williams.

Publication information
- Publisher: DC Comics
- First appearance: Superman (vol. 2) #206 (August 2004)
- Created by: Brian Azzarello; Jim Lee

In-story information
- Species: Human cyborg
- Abilities: Via cybernetics: Superhuman strength, stamina, and durability; Regenerative healing; Razor-sharp retractable claws

Equus is a comic book supervillain and a cyborg mercenary in the DC Comics universe who serves as an opponent of Superman. Created by writer Brian Azzarello and artist Jim Lee, he first appeared in Superman (vol. 2) #206, which was published in June 2004 as part of the "For Tomorrow" storyline.

== Fictional character biography ==
Equus is a human who underwent extensive modifications and was converted into a cyborg as a prototype for the OMAC Project. Superman first meets Equus after tracing the Vanishing, an event in which his wife Lois Lane and one million people suddenly disappeared, to an unspecified country in the Middle East. Investigating, Superman intervenes in a civil war by taking all the guns from the combatants. The fighting continues however, and in his continued quest to put an end to it, Superman confronts Equus. General Nox, the leader of the rebels, puts an end to the fight between the two beings, telling Superman that his side has won the war, and showing him that the people outside the palace where Superman and Equus had fought were now cheering Nox's name. Although Superman initially stands down, he later appears before Nox, who has obtained a weapon said to be responsible for the Vanishing. Although still operational, it lacks any accuracy, functioning like a shotgun. Superman then appears, demanding to know of the weapon's origins. When Nox informs him that the former king had intended to use it against Nox, and that the king is to be executed, along with more than a dozen other members of the king's regime, Superman intervenes, feeling that the condemned men deserve a trial, again coming to blows with Equus, who carries out the execution. During the fight, Superman rips the claws right out of Equus' right arm, and seemingly defeats him.

Superman then returns to Nox's palace, confronting him with the question of what he intends to do with the weapon, but is attacked by Equus. Superman is less forgiving in this rematch, using his X-ray and microscopic visions to learn much about Equus' enhancements, and physically disabling much of their exterior components. Equus escapes by activating the weapon, causing himself and 300,000 other people to vanish.

Superman subsequently learns that Equus has been working for a mysterious man named Elias Orr. Orr explains to Superman that his employers financed Nox's war and loaned Equus to them. Eventually, Superman tracks all the victims of the Vanishing to Metropia, an artificial paradise within the Phantom Zone. He learns that Equus has also been transported to the Phantom Zone and has allied with General Zod.

Equus reappears under Elias Orr's command in Countdown to Final Crisis (2007), where he battles Karate Kid and Una. After receiving a beating from Karate Kid, Equus severs the railroad tracks on which Karate Kid and Una's train is traveling and tells the police that the derailment was caused by a metahuman attack. Karate Kid and Una eventually are able to beat Equus, disabling him and leaving him without an arm. The arm is retrieved for attachment, and Orr sets the Legionnaires on Buddy Blank's tracks.

In the 2008 Cyborg miniseries, the Teen Titans battle fight numerous clones of Equus and Wildebeest to prevent them from helping Cyborg against the "Cyborg Revenge Squad".

== Powers and abilities ==
Equus is a human who underwent extensive genetic engineering, cybernetic enhancements, hormone therapy, and trans-species implantation as part of the One Man Army Corps (OMAC) project. He possesses enhanced musculature, foot-long claws extending from his knuckles, and a healing factor that enables him to regenerate lost limbs.

== In other media ==
A hologram of Equus appears in the Superman & Lois episode "Of Sound Mind".
