= For Tomorrow =

For Tomorrow may refer to:

- For Tomorrow (song)
- For Tomorrow (comics)
