= All Star Batman =

All Star Batman may refer to:

- All-Star Batman (comic book) (2016–2017), a comic series by Scott Snyder as part of the DC Rebirth brand
- All Star Batman & Robin, the Boy Wonder (2005–2008), a comic series by Frank Miller
