= Superman Unchained =

2013–14 comic book series

- Cover of Superman Unchained #1 (June 2013), art by Jim Lee and Scott Williams.

Publication information
- Publisher: DC Comics
- Schedule: Monthly
- Format: Limited series (formerly ongoing)
- Genre: Superhero
- Publication date: June 2013 – November 2014
- No. of issues: 9
- Main character: Superman

Creative team
- Written by: Scott Snyder
- Penciller: Jim Lee
- Inker: Scott Williams
- Letterer: Sal Cipriano
- Colorist: Alex Sinclair
- Editor(s): Chris Conroy, Matt Idelson

Collected editions
- Hardcover: ISBN 978-1779-526-23-6

Superman Unchained is a 2013–14 comic book miniseries published by the comic book publishing company DC Comics, and featuring the superhero Superman, as he encounters a powerful new opponent named W.R.A.I.T.H. who may be his match. Originally billed as ongoing, the series launched in June 2013 to mark Superman's 75th anniversary, two days before the release of the feature film Man of Steel, and ran for a year and a half. A continuation of DC's 2011 relaunch of its entire monthly line of books known as The New 52, the series was written by Scott Snyder and illustrated by Jim Lee and Scott Williams. The entire story received largely positive reviews.

== Publication history ==
A new Superman title was first rumored by Rich Johnston. Johnston speculated that a series titled Man of Steel, written by Scott Snyder and drawn by Jim Lee would launch in 2013, to coincide with the film of the same name.

DC Comics later announced a new Superman series at the New York Comic Con in autumn 2012, to be written by Scott Snyder with art by Jim Lee.

The official title of the series was revealed as Superman Unchained. To celebrate Superman's 75th anniversary, the series was launched on June 12, 2013, two days before the release of the feature film Man of Steel. The series also featured a back-up feature, written by Scott Snyder and illustrated by Dustin Nguyen.

Snyder has noted that the series, "like Court of Owls for Batman, it's a character piece for Clark—it's going to challenge him to his core". Explaining his approach to Superman Unchained:

"I tried to take all of Superman's greatest strengths and turned them into weaknesses, turning them on their head to challenge him. There are new things, and they will surprise you, it has all the iconic moments you'd want, but it's still classic Superman even though it's fresh and different".

— Scott Snyder,

As part of the 75th anniversary celebration, Superman Unchained #1 (June 2013) shipped with eight variant covers, each one drawn in the style of a different comic book era featuring Superman. Superman Unchained #2 (July 2013) and Superman Unchained #3 (August 2013) also were published in multiple editions bearing variant covers echoing the styles of various periods in Superman history.

The first issue included a double-sized fold-out poster; it fits in as an actual page of the story.

The series was set to conclude in April 2014 with issue #9, but following delays in publication, issues #8 and #9 were cancelled and re-solicited at a later date.

== Plot ==
The prologue of the first issue takes place during the atomic bombing of Nagasaki; the "Fat Man" bomb is revealed to have been a superhuman employed by the U.S. Military.

Superman stops seven satellites from colliding into the Earth, letting an eighth object hit an abandoned military base. Superman initially suspects that Lex Luthor is behind this incident, as this attack is similar to a scheme Luthor had devised a while back. Luthor disavows all knowledge of the attack as years ago someone had stolen his research. He asks Superman if he had considered the cyber-terrorist group Ascension. When Clark Kent writes up an article about the event, Lois Lane informs him that all eight satellites attacks were successfully stopped. Superman investigates the impact site of the eighth satellite and notices that a superhuman had redirected it. After a submarine fires two torpedoes at Superman, General Lane is revealed to be working in a secret military installation, housing a superhuman who has been in the employ of the United States for nearly 75 years.

Superman is in Dubai, United Arab Emirates, to combat a rogue construction machine that has been tampered with by Ascension. To stop the Burj Khalifa from falling, Superman creates a whirlwind of water and freezes it beneath the skyscraper before it can collapse. Superman then goes to the Batcave, where Bruce Wayne is testing a new suit that can manipulate the environment to render him undetectable by Kal-El. After studying a piece of the eighth satellite, Batman has determined that another being with slightly more power than Superman was responsible for stopping its impact. On top of that, Ascension concerns Bruce because they can access and control almost any technology and turn it into a weapon, like the construction robot from earlier. Clark calls Lois and inquires about her father's whereabouts. She mentions that General Lane's mail has been coming from Utah. While Superman was en route to Utah, Lois's plane was taken over by Ascension and crashes into the ocean. At the MAW, a high-security prison off the coast of Metropolis, Lex Luthor constructs a suit of powered armor out of various pieces of a model city and escapes. Once in Utah, Superman confronts General Lane, who has been anticipating his arrival figuring that his daughter would eventually help Superman. General Lane has his men unveil the weapons they had been developing to fight Superman. One gun can fire lasers that use black hole technology. Superman demands to know more about the superhuman, who is called W.R.A.I.T.H. (William Rudolph's Ace In the Hole).

General Lane's men open fire on him as W.R.A.I.T.H. bursts from the ground, stating that he's been waiting a long time to deal with Superman. Superman uses his powers to destroy General Lane's weapons but is stopped by W.R.A.I.T.H who kicks him so hard that he is sent flying and lands in Colorado. When Superman stands up W.R.A.I.T.H lands in front of Superman telling him, he was following the General's orders but wants to take Superman back to his home. General Lane and W.R.A.I.T.H show Superman "the Machine", a research facility dedicated to understanding and implementing the equation technology W.R.A.I.T.H had brought them in the years since his arrival on Earth. Superman learns that W.R.A.I.T.H has been working for America for all these years, eradicating anything the government considered a threat. Lane also criticizes Superman, calling him a coward. Lane argues that while Superman may save people such as the astronauts on the space station he is a mass murderer for not getting involved in political situations. For instance, not toppling dictators and warlords in various countries around the world: "You're deciding to let people live in misery, die suffering. You're killing them. Painfully... Because you're afraid to do the tough things you know you should do". Before Lane could continue, Superman and W.R.A.I.T.H fly to Tokyo to stop an Ascension attack. W.R.A.I.T.H is excited to finally work alongside Superman, while a mysterious person using a crystal recovers Lois's plane. Superman and W.R.A.I.T.H arrive at the attack, but not before Wraith tells Superman that soon he will have to kill him. Lex Luthor captures Jimmy Olsen telling him that since he's Superman's friend, why not be his.

Luthor tells the kidnapped Jimmy Olsen that he knows how Superman will die. Superman and W.R.A.I.T.H continue fighting the Ascension robots. Superman is hit during the fight and starts to bleed, W.R.A.I.T.H tells him that the robots were designed by the Russians for one purpose, to kill Superman. Lois helps the man with the crystal to safety, after which he gives her the gem and tells her Superman won't be alive for much longer. W.R.A.I.T.H and Superman encounter an Ascension video explaining to Superman that he will die in the same place where "the great lie began". Superman and W.R.A.I.T.H continue to fight as they come up with a plan to stop the robots. After the fight, Superman asks W.R.A.I.T.H why is he going to have to kill him. W.R.A.I.T.H tells him that eventually, he will do something that will cross the line and the US Government will need him removed. Perry White calls Clark saying that Jimmy is missing and that Lois' plane has crashed. Lois and the mystery man run away from Ascension guards, but as the man dies saving Lois from a car crash, he gives her the crystal, though she is captured immediately afterward by Ascension. Lex tells Jimmy that Jimmy Olsen himself will cause Superman's death. Lois wakes up in a room where an Ascension hologram tells Lois that they have the same father - General Lane.

In a flashback that runs throughout the fifth issue, Clark Kent and Lana Lang are standing on top of a grain store discussing their astronomy teacher. When they try to jump off the roof, Lana slips with Clark holding her hand. After closing his eyes in panic, Clark realized that he was flying while carrying Lana. Back at his house in Smallville, Clark stumbles upon Jedidiah Colder, whose property he and Lana had been trespassing on, pointing a shotgun at his mother. Colder tells Clark that he saw him floating in the air earlier. Realizing that he's not human, Colder shoots Clark while shouting "No more hiding!"

In the present, Superman brings W.R.A.I.T.H to the Fortress of Solitude after their failure to detect Lois and Ascension. The Ascension hologram reveals himself to Lois as Jonathan Rudolph, grandson of General William Rudolph, the creator of "The Machine". Jonathan shows Lois the Earthstone, a material created through the mixing of some of the rarest and purest stones on Earth. It's a technology far beyond any available to humankind in the 20th or 21st century and seems physically similar to Kryptonite. Ascension attempted to erase the work that Wraith's equation had done to aid humankind in progression, allowing them to develop on their terms. W.R.A.I.T.H notices that Superman doesn't share the technology in the Fortress with the US government. Superman believes that no country should have access to this kind of technology. W.R.A.I.T.H reveals to Superman that he was once ordered to find out who Superman was but refused because his human disguise will not last forever. Stating that as time passes, he will constantly have to change his appearance to look older to blend in: "You're neither here nor there. You live in a limbo that cannot last". W.R.A.I.T.H grabs one of the nearby weapons and alerts General Lane that he has the weapons. At that moment Batman calls Superman that Ascension has launched every nuclear weapon in the world at once.

Superman uses the data that he sent Batman to track Lois hoping she is still with the terrorist group. Superman arrives freeing Lois and notices the Earthstone crystals are similar to the ones that make the Fortress of Solitude. The Ascension leader blows up the base but not before Superman escapes with Lois and an Earthstone crystal. Superman uses one of the Earthstone shards to destroy all of the nukes. Superman lands with Lois trying to catch his breath, commenting on the fact he thought he heard a voice in the crystal. However, W.R.A.I.T.H arrives and attacks Superman. Superman uses a ring that was given to him by Batman to weaken W.R.A.I.T.H enough to beat him, causing W.R.A.I.T.H to fly away. Superman takes Lois to the Fortress of Solitude to try and study the crystal but is interrupted by her father and his Anti-Superman army.

Superman places Lois in a safe area while he puts on a battle suit. He fights but is overwhelmed by the General's machines. Lois escapes and uses the Earthstone crystal to save Superman. Superman opens General Lane's armor suit asking him where W.R.A.I.T.H is. Superman crashes into the Batcave seeing that Batman and Wonder Woman are fighting a losing battle against W.R.A.I.T.H. He fights W.R.A.I.T.H in a struggle that spans the globe. Eventually, their altercation ends up in the center of the Earth. W.R.A.I.T.H realizes that the magnetic field is disrupting his power. Now that both aliens are on an equal playing field, Superman uses his superior fighting ability to win.

Superman flies back to Lois, and Jimmy Olsen is there with the device on his arm. It has a message from Lex Luthor. W.R.A.I.T.H was secretly planning on his people invading and taking over the world. The voice in the crystal was the armada on its way. Lex has a plan to stop them, but it would mean the death of Superman. Inside Jimmy's device is a solar reactor that could charge the entire city of Metropolis. Since Superman absorbs solar radiation, he could incorporate that power, but he would become a bomb. Batman and Wonder Woman call Superman informing him that something in orbit is approaching. Jimmy's device opens up and reveals that there is a needle inside. Superman takes the needle and flies into outer space as all the electronics in the world begin to shut down. While in space, Superman first tries to destroy the ships but is overwhelmed. Before he can inject himself, W.R.A.I.T.H takes the needle and injects himself. He pushes Superman away as he explodes, taking out the entire armada. In the end, Superman captures Lex and Jimmy has the device cut off by A.R.G.U.S.

== Reception ==
Reception to the launch of the title was largely positive. IGN gave the first issue an 8.9 out of 10, saying the issue was "the most entertaining Superman story in some time". Comic Book Resources gave the first issue 4.5 out of 5 stars: "DC has found the right creators to make Superman great again". Newsarama gave the first issue a 7 out of 10, saying there "seemed to lack the same 'punch' from other story arcs".

The entire limited series received largely positive reviews. According to Comic Book Roundup, the entire series received an average rating of 7.9 out of 10 based on 202 reviews.

== Sales ==
Sales of the comic were strong, topping sales charts during the first three months of its publication. The first issue in particular sold more than 250,000 copies and generated $1.25 million in retail sales, estimates ICv2, thus taking the #1 sales slot by a wide margin in a month where DC Comics dominated the top ten spots on monthly sales chart.

== Collected editions ==
=== Hardcover ===
Title	Material collected	Publication date	ISBN
Superman Unchained: Deluxe Edition	Superman Unchained #1-9, material from Superman Unchained Directors Cut #1	December 10, 2014	978-1401245221
