= For Tomorrow (comics) =

2004–05 Superman comic book arc

- Cover of Superman: For Tomorrow Vol. 2 (2005), hardcover edition, art by Jim Lee.

Publication information
- Publication date: June 2004 – May 2005
- Main character(s): Superman; Father Leone; Mr. Orr; Wonder Woman; Zod; Batman

Creative team
- Written by: Brian Azzarello
- Penciller: Jim Lee
- Inker: Scott Williams
- Letterer: Nick J. Napolitano
- Colorist: Alex Sinclair

Collected editions
- Volume 1 hardcover: ISBN 1401203515
- Volume 2 hardcover: ISBN 1401207154
- Absolute Edition: ISBN 140122198X
- Deluxe Edition: ISBN 1401295150

"For Tomorrow" is a 2004–2005 American comic book story arc published in Superman #204–215 by the comic book publishing company DC Comics. Written by Brian Azzarello and penciled by Jim Lee, with inks by Scott Williams, the story begins a year after a million people (including Superman's wife, Lois Lane) mysteriously vanish from the face of the earth. As the Man of Steel tries to solve the puzzle while dealing with his personal loss - as well as guilt over failing to prevent the disaster - a parallel story line concerns a priest questioning his faith and serving as Superman's confessor. This eventually gives way to a plot in which a megalomaniac bent on interplanetary conquest begins his attempt to capture his targets, and fighting through a heavy heart, Superman must stop him.

Coming off of the successful Batman story arc Batman: Hush, Jim Lee's involvement as penciller on this story made it very highly anticipated. Although Azzarello's story received mixed reviews, Lee and Williams' artwork was highly praised, and the series was financially lucrative enough for DC to publish an Absolute Edition hardcover in April 2009.

== Background ==
"For Tomorrow" is told in medias res, centering upon two events that took place prior to the story's start. The first is "The Vanishing", where a million people mysteriously disappeared from the planet, including Lois Lane, leaving only ghostly shadows where they had vanished. The second is Superman's creation of an alternate reality, which he meant to use as a refuge for the people of Earth to use in the event of planet-wide emergency, such as the one that befell Krypton. When creating this reality, Superman also built robots in the likeness of Jor-El, Lara and his civilian identity of Clark Kent to protect it. However, upon its completion, he felt that it was not his place to change the course of a planet's destiny and put the world in the Phantom Zone, erasing his memory of creating it.

== Plot ==
The story opens with Superman struggling with the fact that he could not save all the people that were caught in The Vanishing. He visits Father Leone, a priest suffering from cancer, in his church. Superman tells him how he was in outer space saving Green Lantern Kyle Rayner when The Vanishing occurred, outlining his feelings of guilt as he feels he abandoned Earth when it needed him most.

This is a first of several 'confessionals' between Superman and Leone. At their next encounter, Superman explains how he traced the source of The Vanishing to an unnamed country in the Middle East. In the midst of a war, Superman removes from one side all of their weapons; on the other he faces General Nox, a military leader intent on taking over the country. Nox refuses to stand down and, along with his super-powered minion Equus, fights against Superman's interference. Equus is injured and, in a last-ditch attempt to escape, activates the Vanishing Device, creating a second "Vanishing", which causes himself, Nox, and 300,000 more people to vanish. This leads to Superman having to face the anger of the public and the JLA.

Taking control of the Vanishing Device, Superman and Leone travel to the Fortress of Solitude, where they try to perfect the device so that Superman can vanish himself to discover where the other people were taken. Before he gets a chance to do so, he is confronted by Wonder Woman, who attempts to stop Superman from carrying out his plan. She believes Superman's efforts are likely to result in his death, amounting to a suicide mission. The Fortress of Solitude is also visited by Mr. Orr, who tracked Leone via a painkilling injection Orr administered earlier. Orr is a mercenary who is working for a mysterious group of powerful individuals described by Orr himself as having "80% of the world population working for them in one way or another". Superman fights Wonder Woman and then tells her that the Fortress is set to self-destruct. He also asks her to save Orr and Leone. Moments before the Fortress explodes, he vanishes himself, transporting him to Metropia, the paradise world he had created in the Phantom Zone.

In Metropia, Superman is reunited with Lois Lane. He also learns of General Zod's existence in Metropia. It turns out that it was this Zod who was behind The Vanishing, as he was trying to build an empire in Metropia. The robots that Superman built attack Zod, Equus, who is now working for Zod, and Zod's other followers. The robots are destroyed, which prompts Superman to attack, defeating Equus and Zod. He transports everyone back to Earth and destroys Metropia. During the last moments of the alternate world, Superman tries to help Zod by saving his life, which the latter refuses to allow.

As this is occurring, it is shown that Orr has talked to Leone about Superman. Orr has learned of Leone's cancer and says that he can cure him. The "cure" turns out to be a biological experiment that transforms Leone into an enhanced version of Equus called Pilate. Upon his return to Earth, Superman confronts Leone, who asks Superman to kill him. Horrified at this request, Superman refuses to do so. As Leone continues to argue with him, a recovered Equus attacks, probably thinking that Leone, a construct like himself will help him in fighting Superman. Leone, in a last act of desperation, lunges at Equus, driving them both into a fiery nova, which transports them to an island where they continue to fight. Lois and all the others that disappeared in The Vanishing return to Earth.

Having restored the victims of The Vanishing, Superman has saved the day again. He proceeds to construct a new Fortress of Solitude in the midst of a 'jungle'. Reminiscing about the events, he asks himself, while he has saved countless millions of lives over the years, who will save him when the end comes. With these threads tied, the story ends, but the issues of Orr and the mysterious organization are left unresolved.

== Continuity ==
Equus returns in Countdown to Final Crisis #36 (2007), in which he is trying to instigate a strike on metahumans. The unnamed organization mentioned by Orr is revealed in the 2008 Cyborg limited series to be Project M, which was once part of Checkmate department tasked with researching new human weapons.

== Collected editions ==
The series has been collected into two volumes:

- Volume 1 (collects Superman #204-209, 160 pages, softcover, Titan Books, June 2006, ISBN 1-84576-145-6, DC Comics, May 2006, ISBN 1-4012-0352-3, hardcover, Titan Books, May 2005, ISBN 1-84023-949-2, DC Comics, ISBN 1-4012-0351-5)
- Volume 2 (collects Superman #210-215, 160 pages, softcover, Titan Books, January 2007, ISBN 1-84576-187-1, DC Comics, May 2006, ISBN 1-4012-0448-1, hardcover, Titan Books, September 2005, ISBN 1-84576-184-7, DC Comics, August 2005, ISBN 1-4012-0715-4)

There is also an Absolute Edition:

- Absolute Superman: For Tomorrow (304 pages, hardcover, DC Comics, April 2009, ISBN 1-4012-2198-X)

There is also a trade paperback of the whole story in one single volume, released in February 2013 (ISBN 1-4012-3780-0). The volume went to a second printing in June 2013.

There is also the Superman: For Tomorrow 15th Anniversary Deluxe Edition, published on 4 December 2019, ISBN 978-1-40129-515-8.
