= All Star Batman & Robin, the Boy Wonder =

Comic book series

- Cover of All Star Batman & Robin the Boy Wonder #1; art by Jim Lee and Scott Williams.

Publication information
- Publisher: DC Comics
- Schedule: Irregular
- Format: Ongoing series
- Genre: Superhero
- Publication date: 2005–2008
- Main character(s): Batman; Robin

Creative team
- Written by: Frank Miller
- Penciller: Jim Lee
- Inker: Scott Williams
- Letterer: Jared K. Fletcher
- Colorist: Alex Sinclair
- Editor(s): Brandon Montclare; Bob Schreck

Collected editions
- Volume 1: ISBN 1-4012-1681-1

All Star Batman & Robin, the Boy Wonder is an American comic book series written by Frank Miller and penciled by Jim Lee. It was published by DC Comics, with a sporadic schedule, between 2005 and 2008. The series was to be rebooted under the title Dark Knight: Boy Wonder in 2011, when both Miller and Lee were to finish the last six issues. The series retells the origin story of Dick Grayson, who became Batman's sidekick Robin.

This was the first series to be launched in 2005 under DC's All Star imprint. These series are helmed by renowned writers and artists in the American comic book industry and attempt to retell some of the history of prominent DC Universe characters, but outside of DC Universe continuity, and not be restricted by it, in order to appeal to new and returning readers. Each title under the All Star imprint is set in its own continuity and separate universe. According to Miller, the series takes place in the same continuity as Miller's other Batman-related works, such as The Dark Knight Returns.

Since its initial publication, Miller's writing of All Star Batman has consistently received an overwhelmingly negative critical response, though Lee's artwork has been praised.

== Plot ==
Bruce Wayne and Vicki Vale are at the circus watching the Flying Graysons, an acrobat family consisting of 12-year-old Dick Grayson and his parents. When Dick's parents are shot to death by a hit man, Dick is escorted from the scene by several cops of the Gotham City Police Department in a threatening manner. Batman swiftly subdues the killer, Jocko-Boy Vanzetti and then rescues Dick from the police, damaging both a police cruiser and the car which Vicki and Alfred Pennyworth are in, injuring Vicki in the process. The stern Batman tells Dick that he has been "drafted into a war", and that he will learn much about fighting crime. Batman brings Dick to the Batcave and leaves him there to his own devices, telling him upon leaving that when hungry, Dick may eat the rats and bats in the cave.

After being informed that Vicki has been hospitalized in critical condition, Batman instructs Alfred to contact Clark Kent at the Daily Planet, to request he immediately transport a Parisian doctor who Batman knows as a personal favor. After Alfred provides Dick with food and clothes, Batman and Alfred get into a heated argument, but Batman backs off when Alfred asserts himself.

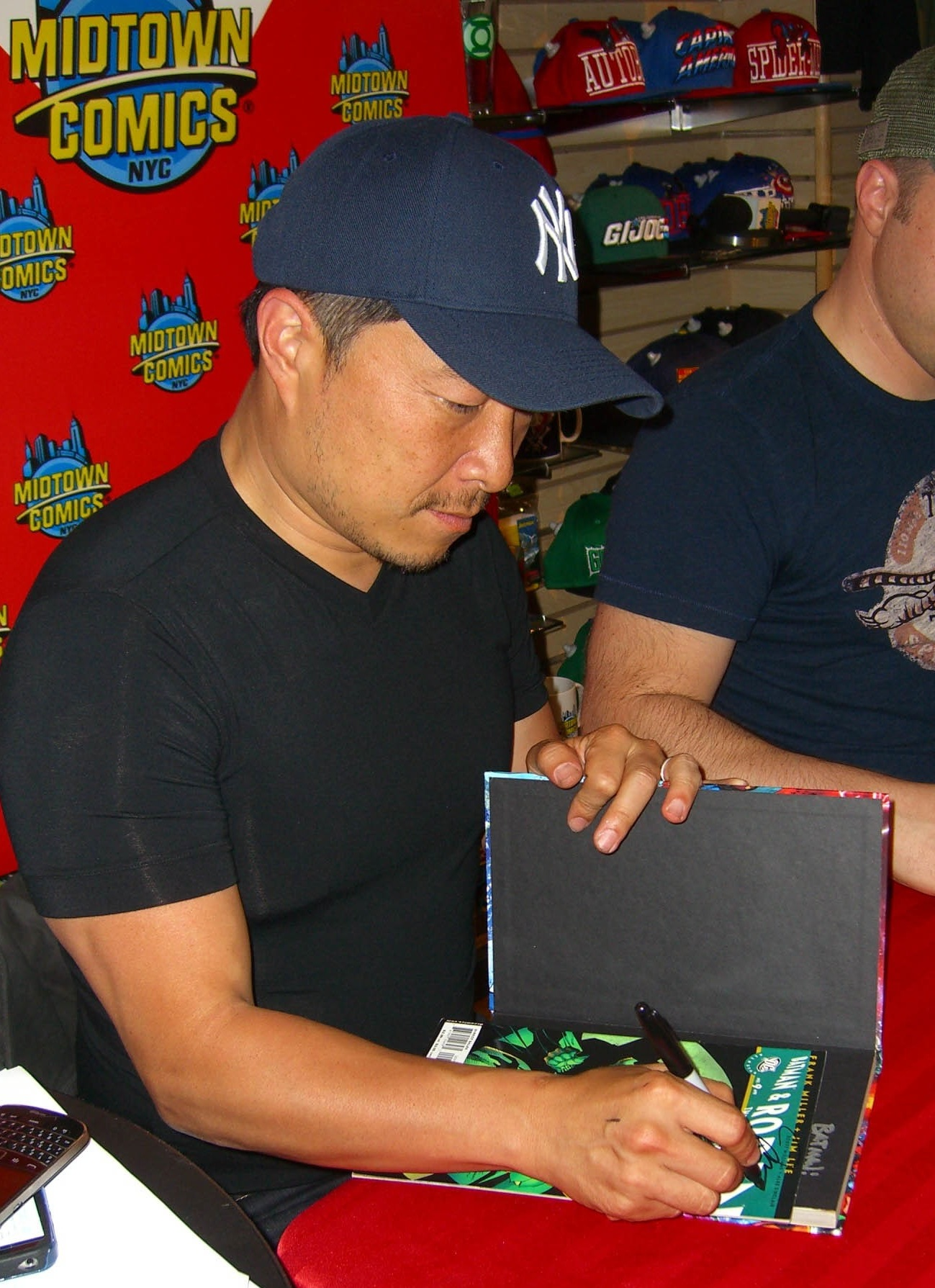
Artist Jim Lee (left) signing a copy of issue #9 at Midtown Comics in Manhattan.

The Justice League, consisting of Superman, Wonder Woman, Plastic Man and Green Lantern, disagree on how to deal with Batman's actions. Wonder Woman wishes to kill him, but agrees to wait until after Green Lantern has had a chance to speak with Batman.

A disturbed Batman spends the subsequent evenings violently dispatching attempted rapists and other criminals until he spots a police cruiser escorting Jocko-Boy Vanzetti away from jail, and returning to Vanzetti the gun he used to murder the Graysons. Batman dispatches the corrupt policeman and beats Vanzetti unconscious.

Batman subsequently comes to the aid of Black Canary, who is fighting a group of thugs. After defeating the criminals, the two have sex, before Batman takes the Canary home, with Vanzetti bound and gagged in the Batmobile's trunk. Batman and Dick manage to force from Jocko-Boy the name of the person who hired him: the Joker. Dick wants to fight crime with Batman, but Batman says he needs a secret identity.

After Batman leaves the cave to dump Jocko-Boy in the river, he then encounters Green Lantern, and addresses him by his surname, "Jordan", bewildering Lantern as to how he knew his true identity. Batman gives Jordan an address to meet him at in 12 hours. Meanwhile, the Joker goes to see Catwoman, and invites her to join him in "some mischief".

Dick creates a costume that includes a hood, basing it on Robin Hood, but Batman points out that an opponent can easily pull the hood down over his head. Batman tells him to lose the hood and names him Robin. Dick receives a new costume made by Alfred.

Batman and Robin adorn themselves in yellow body paint and costumes, and meet Green Lantern in a room painted entirely in yellow, since Green Lantern's power ring has no effect on anything yellow. Lantern tries to persuade Batman that his methods are not acceptable, either to the superhero community or the world at large, but Batman dismisses his concerns, and denies Lantern's claim that Robin is Dick Grayson. Robin then steals Green Lantern's power ring, leading to a fight in which Lantern is nearly killed. After beating Robin and saving Lantern's life Batman then takes Robin to his parents' graves, where they share a moment of mutual grief.

A police officer discovers a beaten and badly bleeding Catwoman. Before vanishing, she passes him a message, that Captain Jim Gordon later passes to Batman. He and Robin find her underground.

Jim Gordon learns his wife has been in an accident, due to her alcoholism. At the same time his daughter, dressed as Batgirl, is fighting crime. The Black Canary robs a group of snuff film makers and proceeds to set them on fire. Batgirl is later arrested, and Jim is shown to be deeply depressed when he calls his former lover Sarah at the suggestion of his daughter.

== Covers ==
The first issue launched with four different covers. Three of them were illustrated by Jim Lee—one sporting Batman, the other Robin and one a sketch variant of Batman. Frank Miller illustrated the fourth. Since then, Frank Miller has drawn variant covers for the series. With the exception of issue #2, the Miller covers are sold in 1:10 ratios. For issue #8 and #9, the variant covers were drawn by Neal Adams. The cover for #10 was drawn by Frank Quitely.

== Continuity ==
The All Star titles are self-contained story arcs existing outside of official DC Comics continuity. Despite sharing a label with Grant Morrison's All-Star Superman, All Star Batman & Robin exists in its own continuity unrelated to other books in the All Star imprint.

Frank Miller stated that All Star Batman & Robin exists in the same continuity as the other storylines in his Dark Knight Universe. This consists of Miller's Batman: The Dark Knight Returns, its sequels Batman: The Dark Knight Strikes Again and The Dark Knight III: The Master Race, Batman: Year One and the Frank Miller/Todd McFarlane collaboration Spawn/Batman. Of these, only Year One is considered canonical to the mainstream DC Universe. This has been proven difficult as The Dark Knight Returns is set during the Cold War with an older Batman, while All Star Batman & Robin features a younger Batman in a more modern setting, specifically 2008. An additional story, titled Holy Terror, Batman!, was also to be included within the same continuity, but in 2010, Miller stated that he was no longer working on the project. He later clarified his statement by explaining that it would feature a new character called The Fixer rather than Batman, and not be published by DC. In 2007, Frank Miller's "Dark Knight Universe" was designated as Earth-31 within the DC Comics multiverse, composed of 52 alternate universes.

== Reception ==
=== Sales ===
The series' first issue sold over 300,000 copies. The once-monthly series was increasingly delayed over time, to the point where only one issue was published in 2006. When issue #5 was released, the series was placed on a regular bi-monthly schedule, with the exception of issue #10, which was postponed from an April 9, 2008 release to an August 27 release, and then to a September 10 release, which it successfully met, only for the book to be recalled due to a printing error that left numerous profanities insufficiently censored. That printing error aside, Jim Lee took full responsibilities for the series' delays, explaining that he was involved with the DC Universe Online video game, and that Miller's scripts had been written some time earlier.

Despite drops in sales since the first issue, All Star Batman & Robin issues regularly topped DC Comics' highest-selling chart on the months when they came out.

=== Critical reception ===
Initially released with great fanfare and much anticipation, All Star Batman has consistently received negative reviews from critics. Nearly all complaints about the series are directed at Frank Miller's writing, specifically his non-traditional interpretation of the main character. In the series to date, Batman is consistently displayed as cruel, amoral, and sadistic, eager to torture and kill criminals and indifferent to harming civilians who get in his way. Infamous examples of this include his verbal and physical abuse of Dick Grayson in an attempt to prevent him from grieving over his parents' deaths, and his throwing a Molotov cocktail into a crowd during a fight.

The infamous and often-repeated line from All Star Batman & Robin #2.

In issue #2 Miller's gritty style of dialogue led the title character to introduce himself to Grayson as "the Goddamn Batman". The phrase was repeated at least once in nearly every subsequent issue of the comic. According to reviewer Brett Weiss, the line "drew derision from fans and critics alike".

Reviewer Peter Sanderson of IGN Comics, while acknowledging that the series is "widely reviled", and opining that DC Comics' publicity for the series was "misleading", suggested that Batman's treatment of Grayson was comparable to a drill sergeant's treatment of a new recruit, but questioned whether this would merely traumatize Grayson further. He nonetheless claimed to be "fascinated" with how this behavior reveals Batman's personality, likening his rough treatment of Grayson to the psychologically frightening experience to which V subjected Evey Hammond in V for Vendetta. Sanderson also pointed out that Miller's view of All Star Batman & Robin as prequels to his graphic novels Batman: The Dark Knight Returns and Batman: The Dark Knight Strikes Again suggests that the darker, grittier take on Batman and his more dysfunctional relationship with Robin make sense when taken in context, and that Batman's rough treatment of Dick Grayson reveals a lot about the inner workings of Batman's personality. Reviewer Brett Weiss, in the Comics Buyer's Guide #1636 (December 2007), gave the first issue of the series high marks for being interesting and edgy, but opined that by issue #6, the series became "a bad joke", citing the series' "absurdly bad, faux-noir dialogue", and presenting Batman "as a psychopath, as opposed to merely dark and disturbed". Weiss praised Jim Lee's art as "gorgeous", but opined that it was wasted on the title, which he saw as "something that seems to be bad on purpose". The series is also known for the recalled issue #10, in which a printing error allowed the word "fuck" to be published uncensored. Unreturned copies were later sold on eBay at inflated prices.

Comics journalist Cliff Biggers, in Comic Shop News #1064 (November 7, 2007), called the series "one of the biggest train wrecks in comics history", saying that Miller disregarded every aspect of Batman's character to tell "a Sin City story in bat-garb". Reviewing issue #7, Biggers excoriated the sequence with Batman and Black Canary as "farcical" and "Tarantinoesque", arguing that Miller's work could not get worse. Biggers gave the issue a "D", explaining that it would be an "F" if not for Jim Lee's art, and suggested that to salvage the work, DC should reprint the book with blank word balloons and let readers submit their own scripts. Reviewing the first three issues of the series, William Gatevackes of PopMatters said that "[Jim Lee's art] is beautiful [but] cannot make up for the writing or the holes in the storytelling". Gatevackes criticized the plot as lacking, saying that "it seems like [Miller is] expanding four issues of story over 20 issues of the book". Gatevackes compared All Star Batman & Robin unfavorably to Miller's previous work: "One is puzzled as to what happened to the Frank Miller who gained his fame on Daredevil, Ronin, and Batman: The Dark Knight Returns. Can he come back? Because until he does, All Star Batman and Robin should be avoided at all costs".

Iann Robinson, writing for CraveOnline, wrote an essay critical of All Star Batman & Robin, calling it "a comic series that just spirals deeper and deeper into the abyss of unreadable. I understand Miller's need to re-invent, but this is just badly done and in poor taste". Robinson commented that "the art by Jim Lee is first rate [and] really wonderful to look at, [but] Frank Miller has stripped Batman of all of his dignity, class, and honor. This isn't the Dark Knight; this is Dirty Harry in a cowl. The worst part is that this is exactly what Batman isn't about. In one fell swoop, Miller has erased all the good he did for Batman with The Dark Knight Returns and Batman: Year One. All of that is just gone".

The book also has its defenders. Jon Morris, writing for The High Hat, named All Star Batman & Robin one of the best superhero comics of 2006, finding All Star's take on Batman "an intriguing alternative take on a character long reimagined to the point of incoherence. Surely the readers as a whole have seen Batman the tortured soul, Batman the awkward father figure, Batman the authoritarian and Batman the zillion-other-paternal character archetypes countless times before under the stewardship of a few dozen other authors; why not for a scant twelve issues have a book about a Batman who might just be what a control-obsessed, Kevlar-suited sadist would be like in real life – which is to say 'distinctly unpleasant'? It's unsavory, sure, but who buys Batman comics because he's warm and cuddly?"

== Unproduced sequel ==
After the series encountered a hiatus of nearly two years, DC Comics announced in April 2010 that Miller and Lee would return to the series in 2011. Instead of falling under the "All Star" imprint, the series was to be re-branded as Dark Knight: Boy Wonder, and would run for six issues, completing the story Miller originally intended to tell. As of 2026, the series has yet to be published.

== Collected editions ==
Title	Material collected	Published date	ISBN
All Star Batman & Robin, the Boy Wonder Volume 1	All Star Batman & Robin, the Boy Wonder #1–9	July 2008	978-1401220082
Absolute All Star Batman & Robin, the Boy Wonder Volume 1	All Star Batman & Robin, the Boy Wonder #1–10	July 2014	978-1401247638
