= Scott Williams (comics) =

American comic book artist and inker

- Born: 1960
- Areas: Penciller, Inker
- Notable works: X-Men; Wildcats; Batman; Superman; All-Star Batman and Robin
- Awards: Inkwell Awards: Joe Sinnott Hall of Fame (2012); Inkwell Awards: Favorite Inker (2026)

Scott Williams (born 1960) is an American comic book artist, best known for his work as an inker, and for his decades-long partnership with artist Jim Lee, both of whom began Homage Studios, collaborating on books including The Uncanny X-Men, WildCATs, Batman, Superman, WildC.A.T.s/X-Men, All-Star Batman and Robin, and Justice League. Williams has also inked the pencils of Whilce Portacio and Marc Silvestri, and books including Gen^{13}.

== Career ==
Regarding his influences, Williams stated in a 2020 interview with SyFy, "I was a big Frank Miller and Klaus Janson fan on Daredevil and their whole run. As I was starting to get professional work and still figuring things out, I literally had Klaus Janson comics laid out next to my drawing table so I could try to see what I could steal. And that's actually what most artists do. They steal stuff and it's a time-honored tradition. There's absolutely nothing wrong with it. If you're a penciler or an anchor out there, and you're trying to figure out what you want to do, you don't have to reinvent the wheel every single time. You can try to figure out what your favorite artists are doing and try to make parts of it your own. What will happen is you will eventually take whatever it is that you're dissecting and you will make it your own and your own style will sort of morph and evolve into something hopefully new. And that's basically what I did. My style came from a failure to adapt to Klaus Janson's style." Other artists Williams cited as influences include Neal Adams and Tom Palmer.

In 2012 Williams received the Sinnott Hall of Fame Award by the Inkwell Awards. His style of inking is done using a brush and a crow quill nib achieving precise thicknesses. He usually inks right over the original pencils of the artist and pays specific attention to highlighting key elements of the penciller's work while adding depth by varying line quality and thickness. In 2026, Williams was awarded the Inkwell Awards Favorite Inker Award.

== Awards ==
- 1993 (nomination) Eisner Award for Best Inker (for X-Men and WildC.A.T.S.)
- 2005 Wizard Fan Award for Favorite Inker (for All-Star Batman and Robin)
- 2012 Sinnott Hame of Fame Inkwell Award
- 2026 Favorite Inker, Inkwell Awards
- 2026 Inkpot Award

== Bibliography ==
- New Mutants Annual #6
- All Star Batman and Robin the Boy Wonder #1-10
- Batman: Hush (Batman #609-619)
- Justice League series 2 #1-6, 8-12
- Superman vol. 2 #204–215
- Superman Unchained #1–9
- Strikeforce: Morituri #1-20 (inker)
