= Jim Lee =

Korean American artist (born 1964)

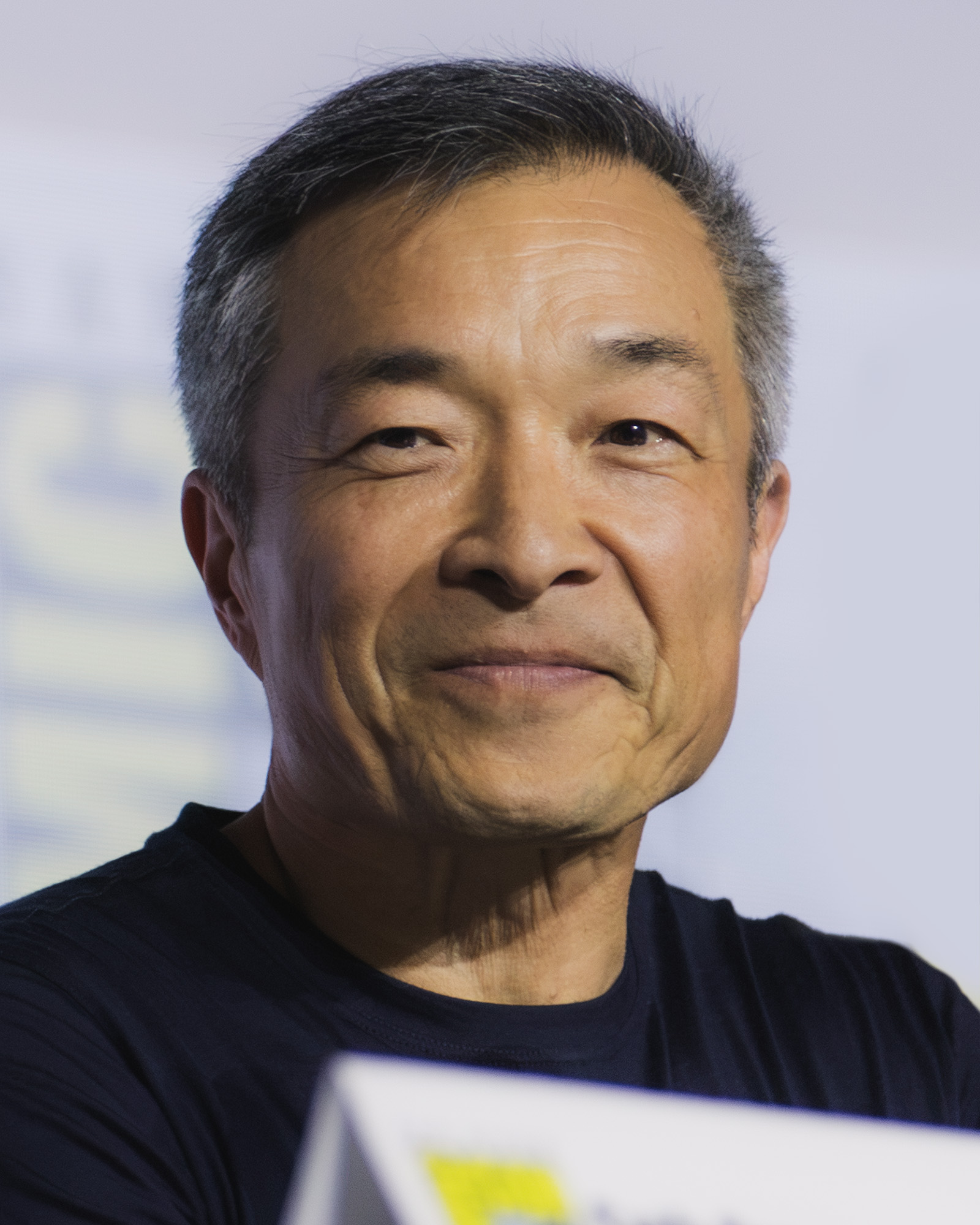
- Lee in 2026
- Born: August 11, 1964 (age 62) Seoul, South Korea
- Areas: Writer, Artist, Publisher
- Notable works: All Star Batman & Robin, the Boy Wonder; Batman: Hush; Fantastic Four vol. 2 The Punisher War Journal; Superman: For Tomorrow; Superman Unchained; Justice League vol. 2 Uncanny X-Men; WildC.A.T.s; X-Men vol. 2
- Awards: Harvey Award (1990); Inkpot Award (1992); Wizard Fan Award (1996, 2002, 2003)

Jim Lee (Korean: 이용철; born August 11, 1964) is a Korean-born American comic book artist, writer, editor, and publisher. As of 2023, he is the president, publisher, and chief creative officer of DC Comics. In recognition of his work, Lee has received a Harvey Award, Inkpot Award and three Wizard Fan Awards.

Lee got his start in the industry in 1987 as an artist for Marvel Comics, illustrating titles such as Alpha Flight and The Punisher War Journal before becoming widely popular through his work on The Uncanny X-Men. On that book, Lee worked with writer Chris Claremont, with whom he co-created the character Gambit. That led to a 1991 spinoff series on which Lee and Claremont were the initial creative team. The debut issue, X-Men #1, which Lee penciled and co-wrote with Claremont, became the best-selling comic book of all time, according to Guinness World Records. Lee's style was later used for the designs of the X-Men: The Animated Series.

In 1992, Lee and several other artists founded the publishing company, Image Comics, to publish their creator-owned comics. Lee published titles such as WildC.A.T.s and Gen^{13} through his studio, WildStorm Productions. In 1998, wanting to spend less time as a publisher and more time illustrating, Lee sold WildStorm to DC Comics, and ran WildStorm as a DC imprint until 2010. During this period, he also illustrated successful titles set in DC's main fictional universe, such as the year-long storylines "Batman: Hush" and "Superman: For Tomorrow"), books (including Superman Unchained), and the New 52 run of Justice League. On February 18, 2010, it was announced that DC Comics had appointed Lee and Dan DiDio as its co-publishers (replacing Paul Levitz). In June 2018, Lee was also appointed the company's chief creative officer, replacing Geoff Johns. In February 2020, when DiDio left the company, Lee became its sole publisher.

Aside from illustrating comics, he has done work as a designer or creative director on other DC products, such as action figures, video games, branded automobiles and backpacks. Outside the comics industry, Lee has designed album covers, as well as the packaging for the General Mills' monster-themed cereal boxes in 2014.

== Early life ==
Jim Lee was born on August 11, 1964, in Seoul, South Korea. In a December 2023 interview, he describes his nostalgic memories of life in that country, where he first began drawing at a young age, using oil pastels with an art teacher who visited his home, and developing a love of Max Fleischer's 1940s animated Superman series. His strongest memory of living in Seoul, however, was when, at the age of 4 or 5, he was hit by a small truck while crossing the street, later regaining consciousness in the hospital in the presence of his father, a doctor. Lee says that the incident increased his parents' sense of protectiveness as he grew older, and summarizes his early years by saying, "Comics. Trauma. Art. That was the be-all, end-all of my childhood."

In the aftermath of the Korean War, Lee's parents desired a better, safer life for their family, and moved to the United States when Lee was in elementary school. They lived in Warren, Ohio, and Youngstown, Ohio, before settling in St. Louis, Missouri, where Lee lived a "typical middle-class childhood". Lee attended River Bend Elementary School in Chesterfield and later St. Louis Country Day School, where he drew posters for school plays. Having had to learn English when he first came to the U.S. instilled in Lee with the sense of being an outsider, as did the "preppy, upper-class" atmosphere of Country Day. As a result, on the rare occasions that his parents bought him comics, Lee's favorite characters were the X-Men, because they were outsiders themselves. Lee says that he benefited as an artist by connecting with characters that were themselves disenfranchised, like Spider-Man, or who were born of such backgrounds, such as Superman, who was created by two Jewish men from Cleveland to lift their spirits during the Depression. Lee also connected with Superman because like Lee, Superman was "the ultimate immigrant", which helped him assimilate into American culture, and provided him a sense of "sanctuary" from the pressures he felt as an immigrant who did not fit in, and the shame he felt as a Korean. For this reason, Superman's practice of wearing eyeglasses in order to effect a disguise was something Lee sympathized with, as he felt that he exhibited an "American side" at school, and then his "Korean side" at home. He developed a desire to one day work in comics between the ages of nine and twelve. Though given a Korean name at birth, he chose the name Jim when he became a naturalized U.S. citizen at age 12.

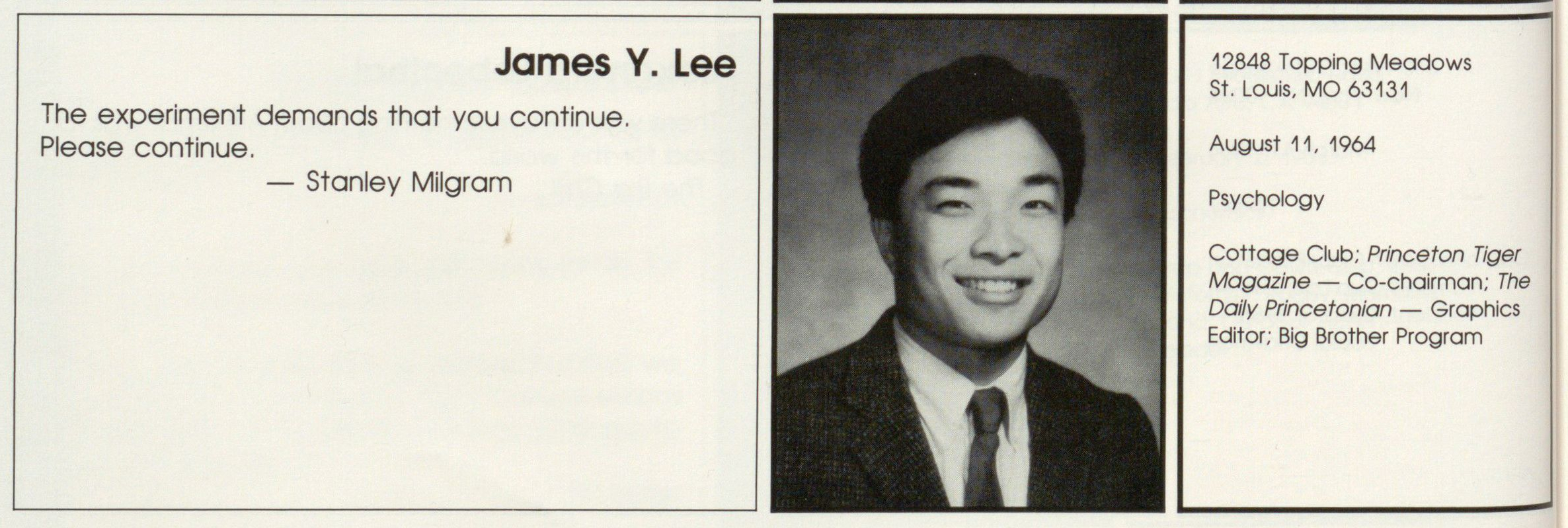
Lee in the Princeton University yearbook, 1986

Lee attended Princeton University. During his junior year in 1984, Lee drew editorial cartoons for the school newspaper, The Daily Princetonian. Lee's classmates predicted in his senior yearbook that he would found his own comic book company. Lee, however, was resigned to following his father's career in medicine, continuing at Princeton by studying psychology, with the intention of becoming a medical doctor. This was largely influenced by the strict expectations of his parents, whom Lee said were "really aggressive in terms of how they wanted me to find true success," owing to views about security and fear of failure that Lee describes as being typical in Korean households.

In 1986, as he was preparing to graduate, Lee took an art class that reignited his love of drawing, and led to his rediscovery of comics at a time when works such as Frank Miller's The Dark Knight Returns and Alan Moore and Dave Gibbons' Watchmen spurred a renaissance within the American comics industry. After obtaining his psychology degree, Lee, having grown to view a career in medicine to a long escalator ride that he did not wish to make, decided to postpone applying to medical school for one year, in order to give himself time to break into comics. When he laid out this plan to his parents, it led to a heated argument that prompted Lee to flee his house. His father pursued him and reconciled with him, expressing understanding of his commitment to his dreams. Lee says that this influenced him to refrain from ever placing the same level of pressure on his own children. Earning the reluctant blessing of his parents, Lee vowed that he would attend medical school if he did not break into the comic book industry in the gap year he allotted for himself. He set up a small drafting table next to his bed, and would spend 8 to 10 hours each day drawing, to the point that he suffered from sore knuckles and a pinched nerve that required his father to give him a shoulder brace.

== Comics career ==
=== Rise to fame at Marvel Comics ===
The samples that Lee initially submitted to various publishers did not find success. When he befriended St. Louis-area comics artists Don Secrease and Rick Burchett, they convinced him he needed to show his portfolio to editors in person, prompting Lee to attend a New York comics convention, where he met editor Archie Goodwin. Goodwin invited Lee to Marvel Comics, where the aspiring artist received his first assignment by editor Carl Potts, who hired him to pencil the mid-list series Alpha Flight, seguéing from that title in 1989 to Punisher: War Journal. Lee's work on the Punisher: War Journal was inspired by artists such as Frank Miller, David Ross, Kevin Nowlan, and Whilce Portacio, as well as Japanese manga.

In 1989, Lee filled in for regular illustrator Marc Silvestri on Uncanny X-Men #248 and did another guest stint on issues 256 through 258 as part of the "Acts of Vengeance" storyline, eventually becoming the series' ongoing artist with issue #268, following Silvestri's departure. During his stint on Uncanny, Lee first worked with inker Scott Williams, who would become a long-time collaborator. During his run on the title, Lee co-created the character Gambit with long-time X-Men writer Chris Claremont.

Lee's artwork quickly gained popularity in the eyes of enthusiastic fans, which allowed him to gain greater creative control of the franchise. In 1991, Lee helped launch a second X-Men series simply called X-Men vol. 2, as both the artist and as co-writer with Claremont. X-Men vol. 2 #1 is still the best-selling comic book of all-time with sales of over 8.1 million copies and nearly $7 million, according to a public proclamation by Guinness World Records at the 2010 San Diego Comic-Con. The sales figures were generated in part by publishing the issue with five different variant covers, four of which show different characters from the book that formed a single image when laid side by side, and a fifth, gatefold cover of that combined image, large numbers of which were purchased by retailers who anticipated fans and speculators who would buy multiple copies in order to acquire a complete collection of the covers. Lee designed new character uniforms for the series, including those worn by Cyclops, Jean Grey, Rogue, Betsy Braddock and Storm. He also created the villain Omega Red. Lee's style of rendering the X-Men was later used for the designs the television program X-Men: The Animated Series. Actor/comedian Taran Killam, who ventured into comics writing with The Illegitimates, has cited X-Men #1 as the book that inspired his interest in comics.

Stan Lee interviewed Lee in the documentary series The Comic Book Greats.

=== Image Comics and WildStorm, return to Marvel ===
Enticed by the idea of being able to exert more control over his own work, in 1992, Lee accepted the invitation to join six other artists who broke away from Marvel to form Image Comics, which would publish their creator-owned titles. Lee's group of titles was initially called Aegis Entertainment before being christened WildStorm Productions, and published Lee's initial title WildC.A.T.s, which Lee pencilled and co-wrote, and other series created by Lee in the same shared universe. The other major series of the initial years of Wildstorm, for which Lee either created characters, co-plotted or provided art for, included Stormwatch, Deathblow and Gen^{13}.

In 1993, Lee and his friend, Valiant Comics publisher Steven Massarsky, arranged a Valiant/Image Comics crossover miniseries called Deathmate, in which the Valiant characters would interact with those of WildStorm, and of Lee's fellow Image partner, Rob Liefeld. The miniseries would consist of four "center books" (each one denoted by a color rather than an issue number), two each produced by the respective companies, plus a prologue and epilogue book. Wildstorm produced Deathmate Black, with Lee himself contributing to the writing. He illustrated the covers for that book, the Deathmate Tourbook and the prologue book, as well as contributing to the prologue's interior inks.

WildStorm would expand its line to include other ongoing titles whose creative work was handled by other writers and artists, some of which were spinoffs of the earlier titles, or properties owned by other creators, such as Whilce Portacio's Wetworks. As publisher, Lee later expanded his comics line creating two publishing imprints of WildStorm, Homage and Cliffhanger (that years later merged and were replaced by a single WildStorm Signature imprint), to publish creator-owned comics by some selected creators of the US comics industry.

Lee and Rob Liefeld, another Marvel-illustrator-turned-Image-founder, returned to Marvel in 1996 to participate in a reboot of several classic characters; the project was known as Heroes Reborn. While Liefeld reworked Captain America and The Avengers, Lee plotted Iron Man and plotted and illustrated Fantastic Four issues #1–6. Halfway through the project, Lee's studio took over Liefeld's two titles, finishing all four series. According to Lee, Marvel proposed continuing the Heroes Reborn lineup indefinitely, but under the condition that Lee would draw at least one of them himself, which he refused to do. Instead, he accepted an offer to re-imagine and relaunch (in the role of editor) three mainstream Marvel Universe titles: Defenders, Doctor Strange, and Nick Fury. Though scheduled to debut in December 1997, these three relaunches never appeared.

Lee returned to WildStorm, where he would publish series such as The Authority and Planetary, as well as Alan Moore's imprint, America's Best Comics. Lee himself wrote and illustrated a 12-issue series called Divine Right: The Adventures of Max Faraday, in which an internet slacker inadvertently manages to download the secrets of the universe, and is thrown into a wild fantasy world.

=== Move to DC Comics ===
Due to declining sales across the U.S. comics industry, and his view that his role as publisher and growing family demands interfered with his role as an artist, Lee left Image Comics and sold WildStorm to DC Comics in late 1998, enabling him to focus once again on art. He drew a "Batman Black and White" backup story for the first issue of Batman: Gotham Knights (March 2000). In 2003, he collaborated on a 12-issue run on Batman with writer Jeph Loeb. "Hush" became a sales success. That same year, Ubisoft released Batman: Rise of Sin Tzu, a side-scrolling beat 'em up video game whose titular villain was designed by Lee, a fact that served as the main draw to the game.

In 2004 Lee illustrated "For Tomorrow", a 12-issue story in Superman by writer Brian Azzarello.

In 2005, Lee teamed with Frank Miller on All Star Batman & Robin, the Boy Wonder, a series plagued by delays, including a one-year gap between the releases of the fourth and fifth issues. Lee himself took full responsibility for the delays, explaining that his involvement with the DC Universe Online video game were the cause, and not Miller's scripts, which had been completed for some time. All-Star also drew controversy for Miller's dialogue, pacing and depiction of the characters, garnering reviews that were mixed to negative, though Lee's art was praised, and the book enjoyed excellent sales. A total of 10 issues were produced of that series, the tenth issue being released on September 24, 2008. In September 2015 Lee indicated the possibility of returning to the book to conclude it with Miller's originally intended ending, but this series was never produced.

Lee continued to run WildStorm as editorial director, sometimes working on both DC and WildStorm properties simultaneously. In September 2006, Lee returned to WildC.A.T.s with Grant Morrison as the writer, but only one issue of that series' fourth volume was published.

Lee provided artwork for the album booklet for Daughtry's 2009 album Leave This Town. In February 2006, it was announced that Lee would be involved with the concept art for the DC Comics online game DC Universe Online. In 2008, Lee was named the Executive Creative Director of the forthcoming game, which at that time was expected to be released in 2009. In February 2010, Lee and Dan DiDio were named Co-Publishers of DC Comics by DC Entertainment President Diane Nelson. According to Lee, this did not indicate another move away from the creative side of comics, as his Co-Publishing duties granted him greater creative involvement in the entire DC line and allow him to illustrate titles. DC announced they were ending the WildStorm imprint in September 2010.

=== 2010s ===
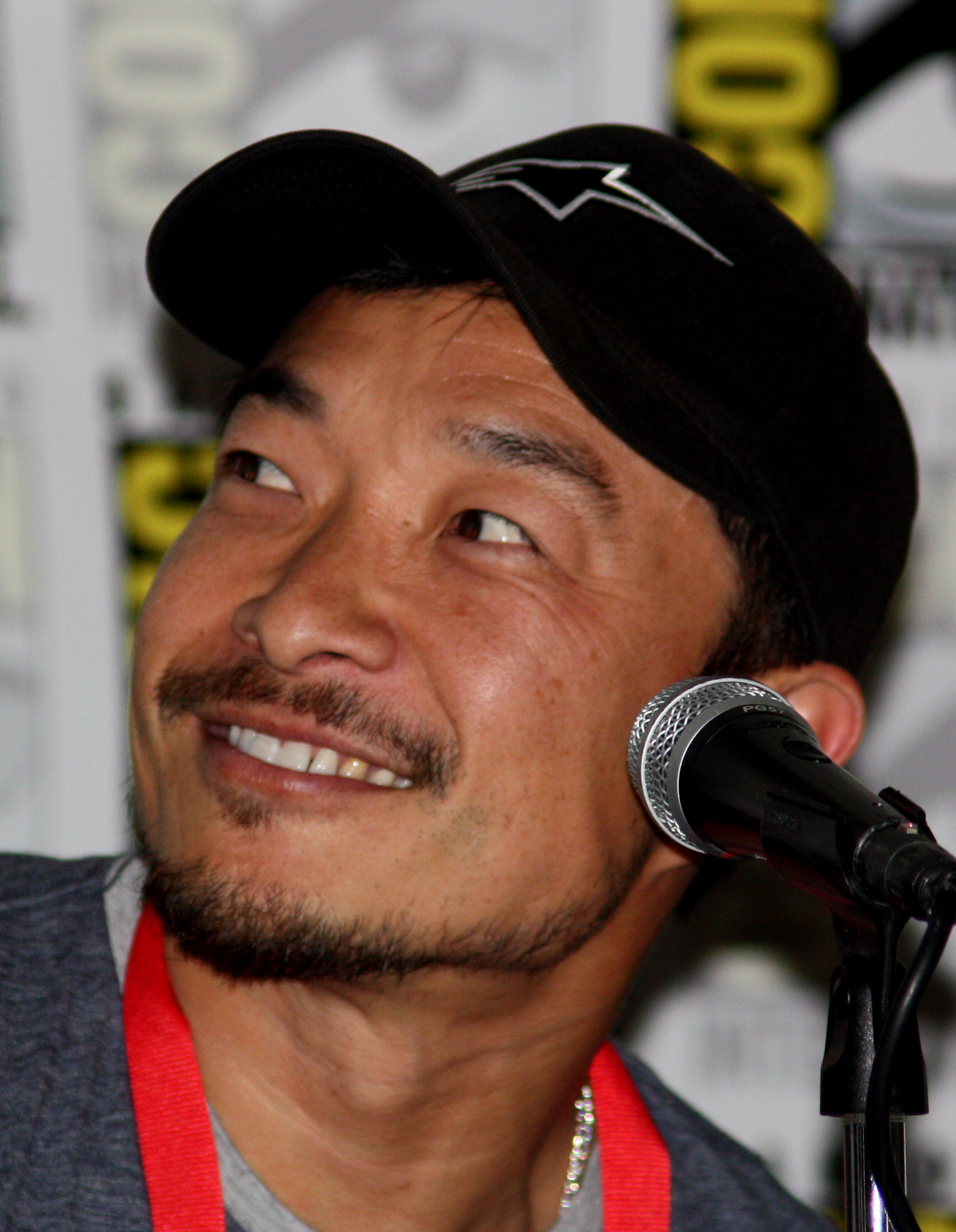
Lee at the 2009 San Diego Comic-Con

In September 2011, DC Comics instituted an initiative called The New 52, in which the publisher cancelled all of its superhero titles and relaunched 52 new series with No. 1 issues, wiping out most of the then-current continuity. Lee and writer Geoff Johns, DC Comics' Chief Creative Officer, were the architects of the relaunch, which was initiated with a new Justice League series, written and illustrated by Johns and Lee, respectively. The series' first story arc was a new origin of the Justice League, which depicted the return of DC's primary superheroes to the team. Lee's illustration for the cover of issue No. 12 drew media attention for its depiction of Superman and Wonder Woman in a passionate embrace, a rendition that Lee said was inspired by Gustav Klimt's painting The Kiss and Alfred Eisenstaedt's 1945 photograph V-J Day in Times Square.

In July 2012, as part of San Diego Comic-Con, Lee and Dan DiDio participated in the production of "Heroic Proportions", an episode of the Syfy reality television competition series Face Off, in which special effects makeup artists compete to create the best makeup according to each episode's theme. Lee and DiDio presented the contestants with that episode's challenge, to create a new superhero, with six DC Comics artists on hand to help them develop their ideas. The winning entry's character, Infernal Core by Anthony Kosar, was featured in Justice League Dark #16 (March 2013), which was published January 30, 2013. The episode premiered on January 22, 2013, as the second episode of the fourth season.

In October 2012, DC Entertainment and Kia Motors America entered a partnership to benefit We Can Be Heroes, a campaign dedicated to fighting hunger in the Horn of Africa. The campaign involves the creation of eight Justice League-inspired vehicles, on whose designs Lee collaborated. Each vehicle is tied thematically to a member of the Justice League, the first of which was a Batman-themed Kia Optima. A Superman-themed version inspired by Lee's art followed in February 2013.

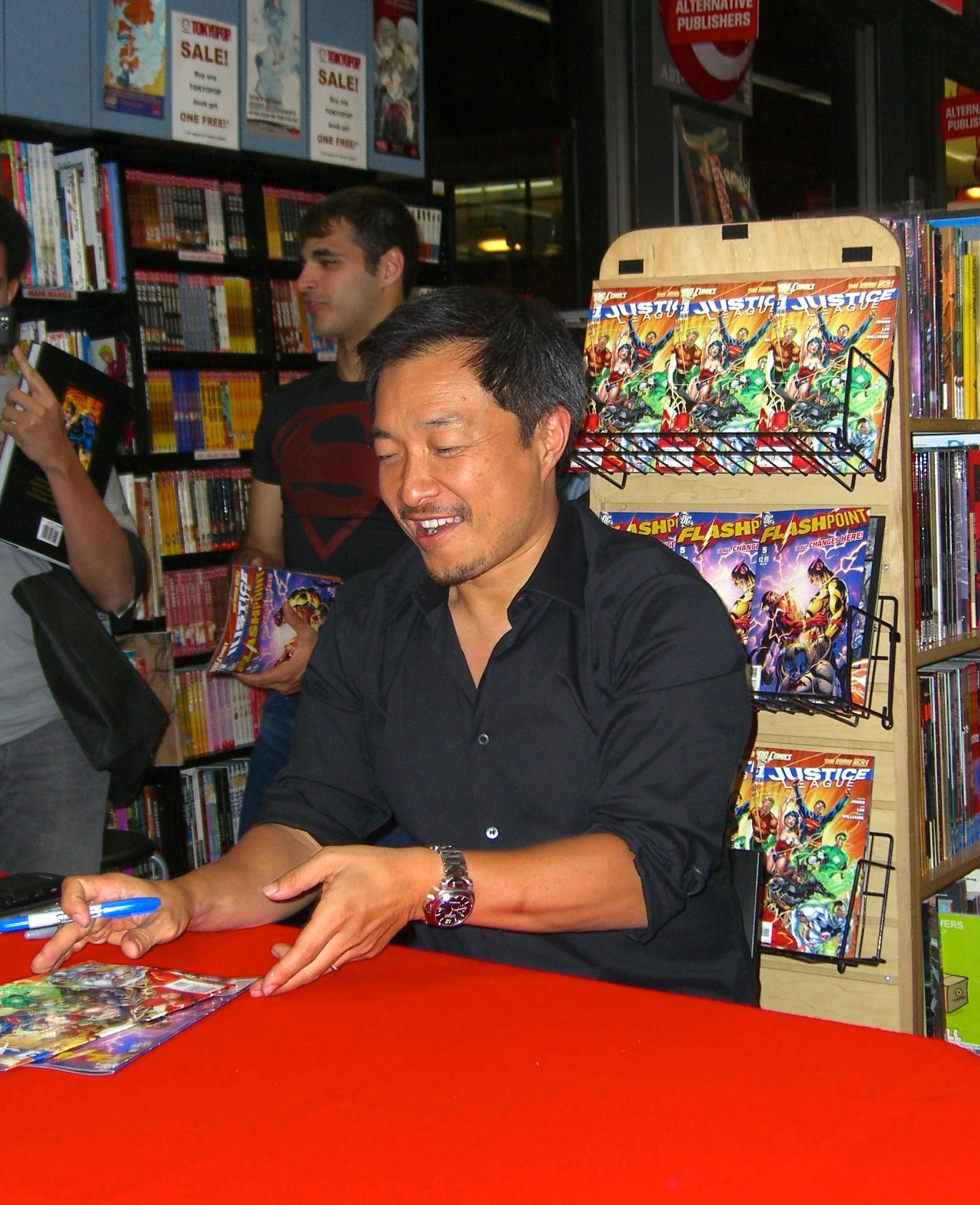
Lee at the August 31, 2011 midnight signing of Flashpoint #5 and Justice League #1 at Midtown Comics, which initiated DC's The New 52 initiative

In 2013, Lee designed a new version of the Mortal Kombat character Scorpion for use in the DC fighting video game Injustice: Gods Among Us.

On May 4, 2013, DC published a Free Comic Book Day sneak preview of Superman Unchained, an ongoing series written by Scott Snyder and illustrated by Lee, which was published on June 12, 2013, and intended to coincide with the feature film Man of Steel, which opened two days later.

In 2013, Lee was announced as a member of a newly formed advisory board of the Comic Book Legal Defense Fund, a non-profit organization founded in 1986 chartered to protect the First Amendment rights of the comics community.

In 2014, General Mills enlisted the help of DC Comics to create new designs for its monster-themed cereals in time for Halloween. The designs, revealed on August 6, consisted of a Boo Berry design by Lee, a Count Chocula design by Terry Dodson, and a Franken-Berry design by Dave Johnson. Describing the task of designing a cartoon character, Lee explained, "Drawing simpler characters is a lot more work and harder than drawing something that's more complicated or has a lot of renderings. Every line counts and every distance between the eyes and the ears, it's all super critical."

In February 2015, DC released The Multiversity: Mastermen, the seventh issue of Grant Morrison's The Multiversity project, which Lee illustrated. That same year, Lee provided designs for a Batman action figure as part of the company's BlueLine Edition series, to be released at that year's San Diego Comic-Con. A Superman figure designed by Lee followed in 2016. November 2015 saw the debut of the miniseries Batman: Europa, on which Lee collaborated with writers Brian Azzarello and Matteo Casali and artist Giuseppe Camuncoli. The book, which was inspired by Lee's time living in Italy, was originally announced by DC in 2004, and intended to feature Lee's painted art over Camuncoli's layouts, but after a series of delays, it was published with conventional artwork as a four-issue miniseries to positive reviews.

In 2016, Lee was the main artist on the one-shot Harley Quinn and the Suicide Squad April Fool's Special sharing art duties on that book with Sean Galloway. That August, DC released the first of eight issues of Lee and writer Rob Williams' new Suicide Squad series, as part of the DC Rebirth relaunch.

In July 2017, Marvel decided to capitalize on Lee's popularity by releasing 29 of its books with covers reprinting Lee's art for its 1992 Series 1 X-Men trading cards.

In March 2018, Lee and writer James Tynion IV launched the series The Immortal Men as part of DC's New Age of Heroes line. That June, following the departure of DC Entertainment's Diane Nelson, and Geoff Johns' stepping down from his role as Chief Creative Officer (CCO) of DC Comics, Lee was named DC's CCO, a role he would assume while continuing to act as publisher with Dan DiDio.

In May and June 2019, Lee, writer Tom King, and CW series actresses Nafessa Williams, Candice Patton, and Danielle Panabaker toured five U.S. military bases in Kuwait with the United Service Organizations (USO), where they visited the approximately 12,000 U.S. military personnel stationed in that country as part of DC's 80th anniversary of Batman celebration.

On June 5, 2019, Lee and the fashion accessory brand HEX launched a Kickstarter crowdfunding campaign for two Batman-branded backpacks designed specifically for comics artists and collectors. The former, the HEX x Jim Lee Artist Backpack, is designed with features specifically for transporting art supplies and portfolios, such as a 11" x 17" dedicated portfolio cases, waterproof pockets for inks and paints, and organizers for brushes and pens. The latter, the HEX x Jim Lee Collectors Backpack, is designed with features for transporting art collections, such as fleece-lined pockets for comics, a poster tube holder, a pocket for the Overstreet Price Guide, and an anti-theft zipper lock. In addition to the Batman artwork by Lee that adorns both backpacks, the collectors version features batarang zipper pulls.

=== 2020s ===
In late February 2020, following the departure of Co-Publisher Dan DiDio, Lee became the sole Publisher of DC Comics. The following month, amid the global COVID-19 pandemic, Lee began a 60-day series of daily sketches, auctioning off the proceeds of each sketch to a different random brick and mortar store that had closed as a result of the pandemic. The endeavor, which was done in partnership with DC and the BINC Foundation, saw the completion of the final sketch in July 2021. That drawing, which depicted Jason Todd, sold for $25,100 on eBay, while the entire campaign raised a total of over $800,000 for beleaguered comics shops.

On November 25, 2021, Lee appeared alongside several other Asian and Pacific Islander celebrities, including actor Simu Liu, tennis player Naomi Osaka, and Top Chef host Padma Lakshmi, in the Thanksgiving Day television program See Us Coming Together: A Sesame Street Special. The program was billed as a celebration of those communities, and introduced the series' first Asian American Muppet, a seven-year-old Korean girl named Ji-Young. The special premiered on HBO Max, PBSKids, Facebook, Instagram, and YouTube, as part of the Sesame Workshop's "Coming Together" initiative, which endeavors to educate children about race, culture, and racial justice. It featured Lee showcasing his illustration of Ji-Young interacting with other Muppets.

Lee was promoted to President of DC Comics in May 2023.

In 2024, Jim Lee's art agent, Albert Moy, publicly announced for the first time in 15 years that Lee was accepting original sketch commissions that would be delivered to customers at conventions at which Lee would be in attendance. The prices ranged from USD $1,000 for 3.25" x 7" head shots in profile, to $25,000 to $35,000 for either full recreations of other artists' covers or 11" by 17", full figure, single character illustrations with substantial backgrounds.

== Technique and materials ==
Lee is known to use F lead for his pencil work. While inking his own pencils on The Punisher War Journal, Lee began using a crowquill nib for the first time. When illustrating full page commissions or sketches, Lee uses the drybrush technique in order to achieve greytone areas with an uneven texture, applying india ink to the paper and then rubbing it with a tissue, or by using a brush to fill in areas of black, and then using the brush to effect drybrush effects after it is nearly depleted of ink. To create white highlights, he uses a Pentel correction fluid pen.

In talking about the artist's work ethic, Lee has said, "Sometimes I wonder if we ever really improve as artists or if the nirvana derived from completing a piece blinds us enough to love what we have created and move on to the next piece. If we could see the work as it is, with years of reflection in the here and now, how many images would end up in the trash rather than on the racks?"

In a March 2024 interview with Agence France-Presse, Lee was asked if AI-generated art was a threat to the comics industry. He replied, "We have to figure out a way to live in a world where it exists, and the source material from which it derives its content is properly credited and compensated. But even if it were accepted and someone were going to pay me to use an AI engine to create work, I just wouldn't do it. I don't create art just so I can have something to get paid for. I love sitting down with a piece of paper and a pencil... I enter this fugue state, hours go by and it feels like 15 minutes, and at the end, I have this incredible sense of satisfaction because I went on this journey and I've created something. Typing something into a prompt and getting something two minutes later? I'm robbing myself of the whole point of why I got into this business."

When asked about his artistic inspirations, Lee cited Neal Adams, John Byrne, Kevin Nowlan, Mike Mignola, Art Adams, Milo Manara, and Barry Windsor-Smith.

== Praise and criticism ==
In the February 1991 issue of Amazing Heroes, writer/artist Barry Windsor-Smith was being interviewed for his Wolverine story "Weapon X'", and touching upon the then-current X-Men comics, Windsor-Smith expressed a positive assessment of Lee, stating:

"I don't particularly read the stuff either, even though there's this great new illustrator on the book named Jim Lee...He's leaps ahead of everybody else as regards new talent. Talk about 'rivet men!" He's a fabulous talent...Jim is new and astonishing. I don't know how old Jim is, I presume he's young, and apart from admiring his wonderful technique — even though it's a trifle overdone; it makes my stuff look like simplicity — I just love the fabulous style that he does it with. I wonder how he can keep that up as a monthly thing for X-Men."

Five years later, however, after having come to regret working on the "Wildstorm Rising" crossover story arc that ran the previous year in the books of Lee's creator-owned studio, WildStorm Productions, Windsor-Smith expressed a different assessment of Lee in an interview with The Comics Journal. Windsor-Smith criticized the depth of the work of artists like Lee and Rob Liefeld, and those whom they influenced (whom he referred to as "the Liefelds and the Lees"), stating:

"Your Jim Lees and all this lot, their product hasn't got anything to do with them, you know? There is no emotional investment...I look at Jim Lee's work, and the guy's learning how to draw. He has some craft to what he does...I don't think it has even crossed their minds that comic books can be a medium for intimate self-expression."

The Comics Journal publisher Gary Groth concurred, stating, "Lee's work is obviously more technically accomplished than Liefeld's, but otherwise it's conceptually comparable." Windsor-Smith added that he had believed in the Image Comics' founders' exodus from Marvel Comics as an important step for creator autonomy and creator rights, and was angered when Lee and Liefeld returned to Marvel to do "Heroes Reborn".

In 2024, following the announcement that Lee would accept commissions to be delivered to customers at conventions, a small subset of fans expressed annoyance for the high prices given by Lee' agent, Albert Moy. A majority of the comics industry expressed support on social media for Lee's right to charge these prices including Bengal, Tom Taylor, Fabian Nicieza, and Mark Brooks. Many comic book writers and artists also shared many stories of Lee's previous generosity on social media. On Twitter, comic book writer Gail Simone shared a story of how Lee drew free charity sketches in order to cover John Ostrander's eye surgery. CBR's Brian Cronin also defended Lee's prices, which he argued were proportionate to the limits placed on his drawing time by his role as DC Comics President, and the level of esteem and demand placed on Lee's art by his status as one of the top artists of all time, much in the same that any business in a free market calculated prices and discounts based on demand. Underscoring this latter point, Cronin observed that Lee was one of only two artists, along with Alex Ross, who had placed in the top five of CBR's 2022 Master Artists List, who were still actively producing comics art. Cronin also pointed out that Lee's art was often re-sold on the secondary market for similar prices, making that pricing on the part of Lee and his agent reasonable. Echoing the arguments of others, Cronin stated that Lee did considerable charity work, and called into question the notion that the prices were motivated by greed. Cronin viewed this criticism as part of the broader practice on the part of the public of devaluing the work of illustrators, arguing that such criticism was not leveled at celebrities who charged fans hundreds of dollars for photo-ops and autographs at fan conventions.

== Personal life ==
Lee is married to Carla Michelle Lee. In 2012, when Carla was pregnant, Lee included a tribute to her in Justice League #5, writing "I LOVE CARLA" on the shattered windshield of a car onto which Batman jumps. As of November 2016, they had nine children, ages 2 to 23.

In the 1990s, Lee bought two pages of Jack Kirby concept art, which Kirby had created for a film adaptation of Roger Zelazny's novel Lord of Light, as part of the cover story to smuggle Americans out of Iran during the 1980 hostage crisis. Lee purchased the art at a Sotheby's auction via Barry Geller, the producer of the faux film, who was selling it to help pay for his child's college tuition. The CIA operation that rescued the Americans remained classified for another 17 years, and thus Lee had no idea of the pages' historical significance, nor did Geller know their true monetary value when he sold them to help pay his son's college tuition (with Kirby's permission). Both Lee and Geller learned of the true story behind the art years later with the rest of the public. In August 2013, four of Lee's children were headed for college, and he and Carla decided to auction off the art through Heritage Auctions in order to pay for their education.

Outside of fan conventions, Lee enjoys traveling and learning new languages. In addition to English and Italian, he speaks some German. He also enjoys scuba diving on occasion.

== Awards and accolades ==
=== Awards ===
- 1990 Harvey Award for Best New Talent
- 1992 Inkpot Award
- 1996 Wizard Fan Award for Favorite Penciller
- 2002 Wizard Fan Award for Favorite Penciller for Batman
- 2003 Wizard Fan Award for Favorite Penciller

=== Other accolades ===
In November 2022, CBR.com published its Top 100 Comic Book Writers and Artists Master List, based on 1,023 ballots cast by readers. This was divided into two sublists, one each for writers and artists, the latter of which ranked Lee at number 4. That result was derived from 33 first place votes for Lee, placing him behind only George Pérez, Jack Kirby, and John Byrne.

== Bibliography ==
=== Interior work ===
==== DC Comics ====
- Action Comics #800 (one page only); #1000 (cover and 12 pages, among other artists) (2003, 2018)
- All Star Batman & Robin, the Boy Wonder #1–10 (2005–08)
- Batman (Vol. 1) #608–619 (2002–03)
- Batman Europa #1 (2015)
- Batman: Gotham Knights (Batman Black and White) #1 (2000)
- Dark Days: The Forge #1 (2017)
- Dark Days: The Casting #1 (2017)
- Detective Comics #1000 (various artists) (2019)
- Harley Quinn (Vol. 2) #0 (2014)
- Harley Quinn and the Suicide Squad April Fool's Special #1 (2016)
- The Immortal Men #1 (2018)
- Just Imagine Stan Lee with Jim Lee creating Wonder Woman (2001)
- Justice League (Vol. 1) #1–6, 9–12 (2011–12)
- Justice League Day, Special Edition, #1 (2018)
- Justice League of America (Vol. 2) #0 (one page only) (2006)
- Legion of Super-Heroes: Millennium #1 (among other artists) (2019)
- The Multiversity: Mastermen #1 (2015)
- The New 52 (Free Comic Book Day) #1 (2012)
- 9-11: The World's Finest Comic Book Writers & Artists Tell Stories to Remember, Volume Two
- Orion (Tales of the New Gods) #12 (2001)
- Suicide Squad, vol. 5, #1–8 (2016)
- Superman (Vol. 2) #204–215 (2004–2005)
- Superman Unchained #1–9 (2013–2014)
- Superman/Batman #26 (two pages, various artists) (2006)

==== Vertigo ====
- Flinch #1 (1999)
- Preacher #50 (1999)
- Weird War Tales (one-shot) (2000)
- 100 Bullets #26 (2001)
- DMZ #50 (2010)

==== WildStorm ====
- Robotech #0 (2002)
- Coup d'état: Sleeper (2004)
- Divine Right: The Adventures of Max Faraday #1–12 (1997–1999)
- The Intimates #1–6 (2005)
- WildC.A.T.s, (Vol. 4) #1 (2006)
- Wildstorm Fine Arts Spotlight: Jim Lee (2006)
- World of Warcraft Convention Exclusive Ashcan (2007)
- Ex Machina #40 (2008)

==== Image Comics ====
- Darker Image #1 (1993)
- Deathblow #1–3; (with Trevor Scott): #0 (1993–96)
- Deathmate Black (among other artists) (1993)
- Divine Right #1–12 (1997–99)
- Gen^{13} #0, 4–7 (1994)
- Grifter/Shi, 2-part miniseries, #1 (with Travis Charest) (1996)
- Moonlight and Ashes: Fire From Heaven, 2-part miniseries, #2 (1996)
- Savage Dragon #13 (1994)
- StormWatch #47 (1997)
- WildC.A.T.s (Vol. 1) #1–13 (1992–94), #19 (1995), #31–32 (1996–97), #50 (1998)
- Wildcats/X-Men: The Silver Age #1 (1997)

==== Marvel Comics ====
- Alpha Flight #51, 53, 55–62, 64 (1987–88)
- Classic X-Men #39 (new backup story) (1989)
- Daredevil Annual #5 (1989)
- Fantastic Four (Vol. 2) #1–6 (1996–97)
- Guardians of the Galaxy #10 (1991)
- Iron Man (Vol. 2) #6 (among other artists) (1997)
- Justice #30 (1989)
- Marvel Comics Presents #33 (1989)
- Spider-Man #10 (co-inker) (1991)
- Punisher Annual #2 (1989)
- The Punisher War Journal #1–12, 17–19 (1988–90)
- St. George #8 (1989)
- Critical Mass #4 (among other artists) (1990)
- Solo Avengers (Mockingbird story) #1 (1987)
- Stryfe's Strike File #1 (among other artists) (1993)
- The Uncanny X-Men #248 (1989), 256–258 (1989–1990), 267–277 (1990–1991)
- Uncanny X-Men 3D #1 (2019)
- What The--?! #5 (1989)
- X-Men (Vol. 2) #1–11 (1991–92)
- X-Men Hot Shots (1996)

==== Marvel Comics / Image Comics ====
- WildC.A.T.s/X-Men: The Silver Age (1997)

==== Compilations ====
- Icons: The DC & Wildstorm Art of Jim Lee (Titan Books, 2010)

=== Cover work ===
==== Aspen ====
- Soulfire #4 (variant cover) (2005)
- Iron and the Maiden #4 (variant cover) (2007)

==== Dark Horse Comics ====
- The Umbrella Academy Dallas #1 (variant cover) (2008)

==== DC Comics ====
- Absolute Superman: For Tomorrow (new cover) (2009)
- Superman/Batman #10 (variant cover) (2004)
- Catwoman: The Movie (2004)
- Countdown to Infinite Crisis (with Alex Ross) (2005)
- Infinite Crisis #1–7 (2005–2006)
- Captain Atom Armageddon #1 (variant cover) (2005)
- Trinity (Vol. 1) #14–18 (2008), #25–27 (2008), #31–33 (2009)
- Final Crisis Secret Files #1 (2009)
- Green Lantern (Vol. 4) #50 (variant cover) (2010)
- Legion of Super-Heroes (Vol. 6) #1–6 (variant covers) (2010)
- DC Universe Online Legends #0 (2010)
- First Wave #6 (variant cover) (2011)
- Action Comics (Vol. 2) #1 (variant cover) (2011)
- Batman (Vol. 2) #2 (variant cover) (2011), #50 (variant cover) (2016)
- Flash (Vol. 4) #3 (variant cover) (2011)
- Team 7 (Vol. 2) #1 (variant cover) (2012)
- Justice League #7-8 (2012)
- Before Watchmen: Comedian #1 (variant cover) (2012)
- Before Watchmen: Minutemen #1 (variant cover) (2012)
- Before Watchmen: Nite Owl #1 (variant cover) (2012)
- Before Watchmen: Rorschach #1 (variant cover) (2012)
- Before Watchmen: Silk Spectre #1 (variant cover) (2012)
- Before Watchmen: Ozymandias #1 (variant cover) (2012)
- Before Watchmen: Dr. Manhattan #1 (variant cover) (2012)
- Before Watchmen: Moloch #1 (variant cover) (2012)
- Before Watchmen Dollar Bill #1 (variant cover) (2013)
- Detective Comics (Vol. 2) #27 (variant cover) (2014)
- The Dark Knight III: The Master Race #1–9 (variant covers) (2015–2017)
- The Dark Knight III: The Master Race Collector's Edition #1–9 (2015–2017)
- Batman/Superman #18 (Flash 75th Anniversary variant cover) (2015)
- New Suicide Squad #9 (Joker 75th Anniversary variant cover) (2015)
- Titans Hunt #1 (variant cover) (2015)
- Dark Knight Returns: The Last Crusade #1 (variant cover) (2016)
- Justice League of America (Vol. 4) #9 (variant cover) (2016)
- Scooby Apocalypse #1–4 (2016)
- Batman (Vol. 3) #19 (Fan Expo Dallas variant cover) (2017), #45 (variant cover) (2018), #50 (variant cover) (2018)
- All-Star Batman #8 (Fan Expo Dallas variant cover) (2017)
- The Wild Storm #1–12 (variant covers) (2017–2018)
- Kamandi Challenge #8 (2017)
- Dark Nights: Metal #1–6 (variant covers) (2017–2018)
- Hawkman Found #1 (variant cover) (2017)
- Wonder Woman/Tasmanian Devil Special #1 (2017)
- Batman: Hush - The 15th Anniversary Deluxe Edition (2017)
- Action Comics (Vol. 3) #1000 (Dynamic Forces variant cover), #1050 (variant cover) (2018)
- Action Comics: 80 Years of Superman Deluxe Edition (2018)
- Batman (Vol. 3) #45, #50, #125 (variant covers) (2018–2022)
- Justice League (Vol. 4) #1–10, 59 (variant covers) (2018–2021)
- Harley Quinn 25th Anniversary Special #1 (2018)
- Sandman Universe #1 (variant cover) (2018)
- Batman / The MAXX: Arkham Dreams #1 (variant cover) (2018)
- The Immortal Men #2–4 (2018)
- Batman: Damned #1–3 (variant covers) (2018–2019)
- Cover #6 (variant cover) (2019)
- Detective Comics: 80 Years of Batman Deluxe Edition (2019)
- Detective Comics (Vol. 3) #1000 (Torpedo Comics variant covers), #1027, #1063, #1065, #1067 (variant cover) (2019–2022)
- SHAZAM! (Vol. 2) #4 (variant cover) (2019)
- RWBY #1 (variant cover) (2019)
- GenLock #1 (variant cover) (2019)
- Wonder Woman (Vol. 5) #750 (variant cover & Torpedo Comics variant covers) (2020)
- Flash (Vol. 5) #750 (2000s variant cover) (2020)
- Robin 80th Anniversary 100-Page Super Spectacular #1 (1940s variant cover) (2020)
- Catwoman 80th Anniversary 100-Page Super Spectacular #1 (2000s variant cover) (2020)
- The Joker 80th Anniversary 100-Page Super Spectacular #1 (1970s variant cover) (2020)
- Green Lantern 80th Anniversary 100-Page Super Spectacular #1 (2010s variant cover) (2020)
- The Joker 80 Years of the Clown Prince of Crime Deluxe Edition (2020)
- Green Lantern: 80 Years of the Emerald Knight Deluxe Edition (2020)
- Robin: 80 Years of the Boy Wonder Deluxe Edition (2020)
- Sweet Tooth: The Return #1 (variant cover) (2020)
- Batman/Catwoman #1-12 (variant covers) (2020-2022)
- Future State: Justice League #1 (Wonder Woman 1984 variant cover) (2021)
- Future State: The Next Batman #4 (variant cover) (2021)
- Green Arrow: 80 Years of the Emerald Archer Deluxe Edition (2021)
- Wonder Woman: 80 Years of the Amazon Warrior Deluxe Edition (2021)
- Batman/Superman: World's Finest #1 (variant cover) (2022)
- Batman: One Bad Day (variant covers) (2022-2023)
- Dark Crisis #1 (variant cover) (2022)
- Harley Quinn: 30 Years of the Maid of Mischief (2022)
- Batman: Hush 20th Anniversary Edition (2022)
- Batman: Gotham Knights - Gilded City #1 (variant cover) (2022)
- The Riddler: Year One #1 (variant cover) (2022)
- Harley Quinn Annual 2022 (variant cover) (2022)
- The Death of Superman 30th Anniversary Special #1 (variant cover) (2022)
- WildC.A.T.s (Vol. 2) #1 (variant cover) (2022)
- Batman & The Joker: The Deadly Duo #2 (variant cover) (2022)
- Batman/Spawn #1 (variant cover) (2022)
- Nightwing (Vol. 4) #100 (variant cover) (2023)
- Aquaman: 80 Years of the King of the Seven Seas The Deluxe Edition (2023)
- Shazam! Fury of the Gods Special: Shazamily Matters #1 (2023)
- Superman: The 85th Anniversary Collection (2023)
- Titans (Vol. 4) #1 (variant cover) (2023)
- Batman: Gargoyle of Gotham #1 (variant cover) (2023)
- Justice League vs. Godzilla vs. Kong #1 (variant cover) (2023)
- Wonder Woman (Vol. 6) #1 (second printing variant cover) & #3 (variant cover) (2023)
- Batman (Vol. 3) #146 (variant cover) (2024)
- Birds of Prey (Vol. 5) #8 (variant cover) (2024)
- Batman and Robin (Vol. 3) #8 (variant cover) (2024)
- Superman (Vol. 7) #13 (variant cover) (2024)
- Batman/Superman Worlds Finest #26 (variant cover) (2024)
- Catwoman (Vol. 5) #64 (variant cover) (2024)
- Nightwing (Vol. 4) #113 (variant cover) (2024)
- Detective Comics (Vol. 2) #1084 (variant cover) (2024), #1113 (variant cover) (2026)
- Batman/Wonderwoman: Truth #1 (variant cover) (2026)
- Suoergirl (Vol. 8) #14 (variant cover) (2026)

==== Dynamite ====
- Red Sonja (Vol. 4) #11 (variant cover) (2006), #12 (2006)
- Boys #30 (variant cover) (2009)
- Red Sonja: Age Of Chaos #1 (variant cover) (2020)

==== Image Comics ====
- Stormwatch #1-3 (1993)
- WildC.A.T.s (Vol. 1) #21 (1995)
- Fire From Heaven #2 (1996)
- Gen 13 Preview Edition (1997)
- C-23 #2 (variant cover) (1998)
- Spawn #150 (variant cover) (2005), #200 (variant cover) (2011)
- Image United #1 (variant cover) (2009)
- Liberty Comics #2 (2009)
- Tyrese Gibsons Mayhem #3 (variant cover) (2009)

==== Marvel Comics ====
- Alpha Flight #65–66 (1989), #69 (1989), #75 (1989), #87–90 (1990)
- Conan the Barbarian #218-220, #232 (cover inks), #242 (1989-1991)
- The 'Nam #34 (1989)
- The Transformers #53 (1989), #67 (1990)
- The Punisher War Journal #14-15 (1990)
- Ghost Rider (Vol. 2) #5 (1990), #26-27 (1992)
- Wolverine #24,#25, #27 (1990)
- Captain America #383 (inks) (1991)
- Guardians of the Galaxy #10 (cover inks) (1991)
- The Uncanny X-Men #252, #254, #256-258, #260-261, #264, #268 (1989–1990), 286 (1992)
- X-Factor #62 (1991)
- Avengers (Vol. 2) #8 (1997)
- Avengers (Vol. 6) #9 (variant cover) (2017)
- Old Man Logan (Vol. 2) #26 (variant cover) (2017)
- Punisher (Vol. 10) #14 (variant cover) (2017)
- X-Men Blue #1 (variant cover) (2017), #7 (variant cover) (2017)
- X-Men Gold #1 (variant cover) (2017), #7 (variant cover) (2017)
- Astonishing X-Men (Vol. 4) #1 (variant cover) (2017)
- Ms Marvel (Vol. 4) #20 (variant cover) (2017)
- Thanos (Vol. 2) #9 (variant cover) (2017)
- Deadpool (Vol. 5) #33 (variant cover) (2017)
- Invincible Iron Man (Vol. 3) #9 (variant cover) (2017)
- Iron Fist (Vol. 5) #5 (variant cover) (2017)
- Generation X (Vol. 2) #4 (variant cover) (2017)
- Uncanny Avengers (Vol. 3) #25 (variant cover) (2017)
- Champions (Vol. 2) #10 (variant cover) (2017)
- Weapon X (Vol. 3) #5 (variant cover) (2017)
- Doctor Strange (Vol. 4) #23 (variant cover) (2017)
- Captain America: Steve Rogers #19 (variant cover) (2017)
- Peter Parker: The Spectacular Spider-Man #2 (variant cover) (2017)
- Mighty Thor (Vol. 2) #21 (variant cover) (2017)
- Black Panther (Vol. 6) #16 (variant cover) (2017)
- Spider-Man (Vol. 2) #18 (variant cover) (2017)
- Venom (Vol. 3) #152 (variant cover) (2017)
- Daredevil (Vol. 5) #23 (variant cover) (2017)
- Defenders (Vol. 5) #3 (variant cover) (2017)
- Amazing Spider-Man (Vol. 4) #30 (variant cover) (2017)
- Royals #5 (variant cover) (2017)
- Cable (Vol. 3) #3 (variant cover) (2017)
- All-New Wolverine #22 (variant cover) (2017)
- Jean Grey #4 (variant cover) (2017)
- Gwenpool #18 (variant cover) (2017)
- Captain America (Vol. 8) #700 (variant cover) (2018)
- DNX #1 (variant cover) (2026)

==== Vertigo ====
- Transmetropolitan #25–26 (1999)
- Codename: Knockout #14 (variant cover) (2002)
- American Vampire #1 (variant cover) (2010)
- Django Unchained #1 (variant cover) (2012)
- Sandman Overture #1 (variant cover) (2013)
- Mad Max Fury Road #1 (variant cover) (2015)
- Sandman Universe #1 (variant cover) (2018)

==== WildStorm ====
- Wildcats (Vol. 2) #1 (variant cover) (1999)
- Star Trek Voyager: False Colors (2000)
- Gen 13 (Vol. 3) #0 (variant cover) (2002)
- Thundercats (Vol. 2) #2 (variant cover) (2002)
- Skye Runner #1–2 (variant covers) (2006)
- Ninja Scroll #1–3 (variant covers) (2006)
- Red Sonja/Claw: Devils Hands #1–2 (variant covers) (2006)
- World of Warcraft #1–6 (2007–2008)
- New Dynamix #1–2 (variant covers) (2008)
- Prototype #1 (variant cover) (2009)
- Modern Warfare 2 Ghost #1 (variant cover) (2009)
- Ex Machina #50 (variant cover) (2010)
- DV8 Gods & Monsters #1 (variant cover) (2010)

=== Writer ===
==== DC Comics ====
- Scooby Apocalyspe #1 (2016)

==== Image Comics ====
- Stormwatch #0 (1993), #3 (1993)
- Darker Image #1 (1993)
- WildC.A.T.s (Vol. 1) #1–9 (1993–1994)
- Kindred #1–4 (1994)
- Stormwatch Sourcebook #1 (1994)
- Savage Dragon (Vol. 2) #13 (1995)
- Divine Right #1–12 (1997–1999)
- Gen 13 Preview Edition (1997)

==== Marvel Comics ====
- Fantastic Four (Vol. 2) #1–12 (plot) (1996–97)
- X-Men Wrath of Apocalypse #1 (1996)

Preceded by Marc Silvestri	Uncanny X-Men artist (with Whilce Portacio from 1991–1992); 1990–1992	Succeeded by Brandon Peterson
Preceded by Chris Claremont	X-Men vol. 2 writer 1992 (with Chris Claremont)	Succeeded by Fabian Nicieza
Preceded by Tom DeFalco	Fantastic Four writer/artist 1996–1997 (with Brandon Choi)	Succeeded by Scott Lobdell (writer); Brett Booth (artist)
Preceded by Terry Kavanagh	Iron Man writer 1996–1997 (with Scott Lobdell and Jeph Loeb)	Succeeded by Kurt Busiek
Preceded by Scott McDaniel	Batman artist 2002–2003	Succeeded by Eduardo Risso
Preceded by Scott McDaniel	Superman artist 2004–2005	Succeeded by Ed Benes
Preceded by Paul Levitz	Publisher of DC Comics (with Dan DiDio from 2010–2020); 2010–present	Succeeded by current
Preceded by Geoff Johns	Chief creative officer of DC Entertainment; 2018–present	Succeeded by current
Preceded by n/a	Justice League vol. 2 artist 2011–2012	Succeeded by Gary Frank and Ethan Van Sciver
