= Acme Press =

British comic book publisher from the 1980s and 1990s

Acme Press Ltd.
- Founded: 1986
- Founders: Richard Ashford, Bambos Georgiou, Richard Hansom, Cefn Ridout
- Defunct: 1995
- Successor: Acme Comics (1991–1995)
- Country of origin: United Kingdom
- Headquarters location: London
- Key people: Ian Abbinnett, Alan Cowsill, Andrew Currie, Nigel Curson
- Publication types: Comic books, magazines, video tapes
- Fiction genres: Science fiction, horror, superheroes, adventure, humor

Acme Press Ltd. (styled as ACME Press), later known as Acme Comics, was a British comic book publisher active from 1986 to 1995. The company's initial publication was Speakeasy, a monthly fanzine of comics news and criticism. Acme published a number of licensed comics featuring the British espionage properties James Bond and The Avengers. The company also published early work by popular British creators like Alan Moore, Brian Bolland, and Warren Pleece, and it published English translations of some European comics. In the latter half of its existence, Acme formed relationships with American independent publishers Eclipse Comics and Dark Horse Comics, enabling Acme's comics to be distributed in the United States.

Acme operated a comics retail location in South London from 1987 to 1995, also sponsoring a gallery in the basement which featured exhibitions of original comic book art.

== History ==
=== Origins ===
Acme Press had its origins in Acme Comics, a comics direct market service set up c. 1984 by Richard Ashford, publisher of the fanzine Speakeasy (launched in 1979). Meanwhile, Bambos Georgiou, Richard "Dick" Hansom, and Cefn Ridout were all contributors to Speakeasy.

Acme Press itself was founded in 1986 as a publishing cooperative by Ashford, Bambos, Hansom, and Ridout. At this point, with the experience of having put out Speakeasy for close to seven years, the founders felt the time was ripe to branch out into monthly comics publishing. Acme Press' editorial board members included Ian Abbinnett, Alan Cowsill, Andrew Currie, and Hansom (who also served as editorial director for the company's entire existence). (Bambos stayed with the company until 1988, Ashford appears to have left around 1989, and Ridout departed in c. 1992.)

In 1986, Acme secured distribution for Speakeasy and its proposed new comics line through Titan Distributors. At that point the co-operative also added Titans employee Nigel Curson to its board. (Curson left the company in 1989.) Under the new distribution arrangement, Speakeasy won the Eagle Award for Favourite Specialist Comics Publication four out of five years, in 1986, 1987, 1988, and 1990.

The first comics title Acme published was Alan Moore's Maxwell the Magic Cat, a four-issue collection of humorous comic strips originally published in the weekly Northants Post (and previously reprinted in Speakeasy). The fourth volume of Maxwell the Magic Cat contained a gallery of Maxwell illustrations by the likes of Kevin O'Neill, David Lloyd, Gilbert Shelton, John Ridgway, Graham Higgins, Phil Elliott, Rian Hughes, and Brian Bolland.

In March 1987 Acme debuted Kiss of Death, a horror comics anthology featuring the artwork of John Watkiss. Kiss of Death was planned as a three-issue limited series but only published two issues. (It was completed in Last Kiss, co-published with Eclipse Comics in 1988.) That year the company also published its first translation: Kogaratsu, a popular Franco-Belgian samurai title by Bosse (Serge Bosmans) and Michetz (Marc Degroide).

Another title published by Acme was 1989's Lea: The Confessions of Julius Antoine, by Serge Le Tendre and Christian Rossi, an English translation of a French comics album; the book was distributed in the U.S. by Fantagraphics Books. Lea won the 1990 UK Comic Art Award for Best Translated Graphic Novel.

The Acme founders split editorial duties on the various titles, French translations were by Hansom, and many books were lettered by Bambos.

=== Retail location ===
Acme opened a retail location, also called Acme Comics, in 1987 at 391 Coldharbour Lane in Brixton, South London. At one point, future comics writer Alan Mitchell worked as Acme's shop manager. Acme sponsored The Basement Gallery below the shop, which held exhibitions by such artists as Dave McKean, John Watkiss, and Frank Bellamy. Acme effectively closed the Basement Gallery during the Frank Bellamy exhibition on September 3, 1989, due to flooding the previous night. The comic shop struggled on till early 1995 when it was closed due to a combination of poor management and low sales.

=== Acme/Eclipse ===
In the late 1980s, Acme Video was formed. In partnership with C.A. Productions, Acme Video produced and sold four comics-related videotapes, called Comic Profiles, on such topics as 2000 AD, Will Eisner, Watchmen, and Alan Moore.

In 1988 the British market for black-and-white comics collapsed. As a result, Acme partnered with the American independent publisher Eclipse Comics ("Eclipse International") to distribute Acme's comics in the American market. Highlights from that era included Power Comics, a four-issue superhero title by writers Don Avenall and Norman Worker, with art by Dave Gibbons and Brian Bolland. The title was originally published in Nigeria in 1975, and the title's character's names was changed from "Powerman" to "Powerbolt" to avoid confusion with the character Luke Cage (also called "Power Man"), published by Marvel Comics. Another notable title from the Acme/Eclipse era was Aces, a five-issue black-and-white anthology of serialized Jazz Age genre stories which were originally published in Europe. Among its features were "Hollywood Eye," by Francois Rivière, Jean-Louis Bouquet, and Philippe Berthet; "Air Mail" by Attilio Micheluzi; and "Morgan" by Antonio Segura and José Ortiz.

In 1989 Acme struck up a relationship with John Brown Publishing, co-publishing with JBP the two-issue anthology Point Blank, which promoted itself as "The Best of European Strip Art". Creators included Ruben Pellejero & Jorge Zentner, and Giancarlo Berardi & Ivo Milazzo. This title was also distributed in the U.S. via Eclipse. Acme also sold Speakeasy to JPB in 1989.

In 1989 Acme acquired the comics license for James Bond. Hiring American artist Mike Grell (with Ashford doing the script adaptation), the company commissioned the official comics adaptation of the newest Bond film, Licence to Kill. After Acme and Eclipse co-published the 44-page, hardcover color graphic novel adaptation they went on to published Grell's three-issue series James Bond: Permission to Die — the first James Bond comic book storyline not adapted from a previous work — from 1989 to 1991.

Acme licensed the British The Avengers television show characters for the three-issue limited series Steed and Mrs. Peel in 1990–1992. The series featured the three-part story, "The Golden Game," in issues #1–3, by Grant Morrison; and a two-part story, "A Deadly Rainbow," in issues #2–3, by Anne Caulfield; both had art by Ian Gibson.

In 1990 Acme teamed with Eclipse to release Eddie Campbell's The Complete Alec, which collected three previous "Alec" publications — Alec (1984), Love and Beerglasses (1985), and Doggie in the Window (1986) — together with some unpublished material. The collection won the 1991 UK Comic Art Award for Best Graphic Novel Collection.

Acme/Eclipse published Velocity #4 in 1991. Written by Gary Pleece and illustrated by Warren Pleece, it was the "first U.S. issue" of what had previously been the brother's self-publishing venture from 1987 to 1989. A satirical collection of stories, there were no recurring characters, but many recognizable caricatures from politics and pop culture.

Acme reorganized in 1991, changing its name from Acme Press to Acme Comics.

=== Dark Horse/Acme ===
Acme's relationship with Eclipse ended in 1992 (Eclipse would go defunct a year later), and Acme struck up a new arrangement with another up-and-coming American black-and-white publisher, Dark Horse Comics. With Dark Horse, Acme acted more as a packager rather than a co-publisher. (The Acme logo was styled to look like a Dark Horse imprint.) The comics the two companies produced were strictly James Bond titles (edited by Hansom) and the nine-issue series Lux & Alby Sign on and Save the Universe, by Martin Millar and Simon Fraser. (Another James Bond story, "Operation Miasma" by Doug Moench and Russ Heath, appeared in the Dark Horse Comics anthology, issue #25, published Sept. 1994.) Co-founder Dick Hansom, though not technically working for Acme at the time, edited Bryan Talbot's The Tale of One Bad Rat, published by Dark Horse in 1994–1995.

Acme's partnership with Dark Horse lasted until 1995.

=== Closure and further careers of the founders ===
Acme went defunct in 1995. Co-founders Ashford, Ridout, and Bambos all found work in the mainstream comics industry for a time.

Bambos left Acme in 1988, moving on to Dave Elliott and Garry Leach's Atomeka Press, where he worked until 1990. During this period he also produced the Blimey! It's Slimer! strip for Marvel UK's The Real Ghostbusters comic. In the early 1990s, he found some work as a cover inker for Marvel Comics.

Ashford appears to have left Acme around 1989. He had latched on with Marvel in 1988, first as an editorial assistant with the company until 1991. He worked freelance as an assistant editor at Marvel from 1991 to 1994, while performing the same duties at DC Comics. Ashford wrote the Marvel title Excalibur in late 1993/early 1994 (succeeding Scott Lobdell in that role), and then edited Marvel's Conan the Adventurer series during its 14-episode run in 1994–1995.

Ridout appears to have left Acme after the Eclipse era. He wrote a two-part Scarlet Witch story in Marvel Comics Presents in 1993, and worked as an editor for Marvel UK (on the Doctor Who: Classic Comics series) in 1994. He wrote the Fury/Black Widow: Death Duty graphic novel (which was edited by Ashford), published by Marvel in 1995.

== Notable creators associated with Acme ==
- Brian Bolland
- John M. Burns
- Eddie Campbell
- Simon Fraser
- Dave Gibbons
- Ian Gibson
- Mike Grell
- Paul Gulacy
- Rian Hughes
- Simon Jowett
- David Lloyd
- Don McGregor
- Martin Millar
- Doug Moench
- Alan Moore
- Grant Morrison
- Warren Pleece
- John Watkiss
- Norman Worker

== Titles published ==
=== Acme Press ===
- Kiss of Death (2 issues, March 1987–c. May 1987) — horror title by John Watkiss
- Kogaratsu: Lotus Blood (1 issue, 1987) — samurai title by Bosse (Serge Bosmans) and Michetz (Marc Degroide); translated from the French by Dick Hansom
- Lea: The Confessions of Julius Antoine by Serge Le Tendre and Christian Rossi (1 issue, 1989); translated from the French edition Les errances de Julius Antoine (Albin Michel, 1985) by Dick Hansom — distributed in the U.S. by Fantagraphics Books
- Maxwell the Magic Cat (4 issues, 1986–1987) by Alan Moore

=== Eclipse/Acme ===
- Aces (5 issues, April 1988–Dec. 1988)
- The Complete Alec by Eddie Campbell (GN, 1990)
- James Bond 007: Licence to Kill by Mike Grell (1 issue, 1989)
- James Bond: Permission to Die by Mike Grell (3 issues, 1989–1991)
- Last Kiss (1 issue, 1988) — 48 p. horror anthology illustrated by John Watkiss
- Power Comics (4 issues, Mar. 1988–Sept. 1988)
- Point Blank (2 issues, 1989) — reprinted from Cairo #32 (Norma Editorial), and Heavy Metal magazine vol. 11, #3 (Fall 1987); co-published with John Brown Publishing
- Rael: Into the Shadow of the Sun (1988) by Colin Wilson — originally published in 1984 in France; English translation by Dick Hansom
- Sam Bronx and the Robots by Serge Clerc (GN, Dec. 1989) — originally published in French in 1981 as Sam Bronx et les Robots; English translation by Dick Hansom
- The Science Service (1 issue, May 1989) by John Freeman and Rian Hughes — "Collection Atomic Comics"
- Steed and Mrs. Peel (3 issues, 1990–1992)
- Stormwatcher (4 issues, Apr. 1989–Dec. 1989) — written by Acme board members Alan Cowsill and Ian Abbinnett; art by board member Andrew Currie
- Velocity by Gary and Warren Pleece (1 issue, Feb. 1991) — labeled issue #4

=== Dark Horse/Acme ===
- James Bond 007: Serpent's Tooth by Doug Moench and Paul Gulacy (3 issues, July 1992–Feb. 1993) — "Serpent's Tooth" (issue #1), "Blooded in Eden" (#2), and "Mass Extinction" (#3)
- James Bond 007: A Silent Armageddon by Simon Jowett and John M. Burns (2 issues, Mar. 1993–May 1993)
- James Bond 007: Shattered Helix by Simon Jowett, David Jackson, and David Lloyd (2 issues, June 1994-July 1994) — conclusion of Silent Armageddon storyline
- James Bond 007: The Quasimodo Gambit by Don McGregor and Gary Caldwell (3 issues, Jan. 1995-May 1995)
- Lux & Alby Sign on and Save the Universe by Martin Millar and Simon Fraser (9 issues, Apr. 1993–May 1994)

== Comic Profiles video tapes ==
In partnership with C.A. Productions

- Comic Profiles 1. 10 Years of 2000 AD — a Video Celebration — featuring Alan Moore, Dave Gibbons, Kevin O'Neill, Alan Grant, Mike McMahon, Pat Mills, John Sanders, Martin Barker, Cam Kennedy, Mike Baron, and Richard Burton
- Comic Profiles 2. Will Eisner — A Life of Sequential Art — featuring Moore, Mills, Gibbons, O'Neill, Art Spiegelman, John Bolton, Trina Robbins, Walt Simonson, Chris Claremont, Bill Sienkiewicz, and many more
- Comic Profiles 3. Watch the Men — Dave Gibbons and Alan Moore — behind-the-scenes interviews with Moore and Gibbons, creators of Watchmen
- Comic Profiles 4. Alan Moore — Iconoclasm at the I.C.A. — 40-minute "chat" with Moore
