= Maxwell the Magic Cat =

British comic strip created by Alan Moore

- The cover of Alan Moore's Maxwell the Magic Cat vol. 1 (Acme Press, 1986). Artwork by Alan Moore under the pseudonym "Jill de Ray".
- Author: Jill de Ray (Alan Moore)
- Current status/schedule: Concluded weekly strip
- Launch date: August 25, 1979
- End date: October 9, 1986 (Note: Not counting one final strip published on December 1, 2016.)
- Publisher(s): Northants Post; Acme Press
- Genre(s): Humour, politics

Maxwell the Magic Cat was a British comic strip written and drawn by Alan Moore under the pseudonym "Jill de Ray". Moore produced the strip for the weekly Northants Post from 1979 to 1986.

Moore originally pitched the Post an adult-oriented strip called Nutter's Ruin, which they rejected, advising him instead to propose a children's strip. Although Maxwell is on the surface intended for children, Moore inserted metafictional and surrealist elements, adult references, and social/political commentary into the strip throughout its run. In fact, the Jill de Ray pseudonym is a pun on the Medieval child murderer Gilles de Rais, something Moore found to be a "sardonic joke".

Moore has stated that he would have been happy to continue Maxwell's adventures almost indefinitely, but ended the strip after the host newspaper the Northants Post ran a negative editorial on the place of homosexuals in the community. Meanwhile, Moore decided to focus more fully on writing comics rather than both writing and drawing them, stating that "after I'd been doing [it] for a couple of years, I realised that I would never be able to draw well enough and/or quickly enough to actually make any kind of decent living as an artist".

== Overview ==
As writer Andrew Edwards observes, "Moore's key theme in the strip is how mankind's own sense of superiority is grossly misguided". The (mostly) five-panel strip features a sardonic talking cat named Maxwell and his human sidekick Norman Nesbit. The human bully Mangler Mullins makes regular appearances as well, as do assorted other cats (and mice).

Influences on the Maxwell strip can be seen in Charles M. Schulz's Peanuts, and British children's strips like Korky the Cat, Bully Beef, and Dennis the Menace. Edwards feels that writer Grant Morrison's run on the American comic book Animal Man was influenced by Moore's work on Maxwell.

== Publication history ==
Maxwell the Magic Cat was published weekly in the Northants Post (based in Moore's hometown), from August 25, 1979, to October 9, 1986, initially earning Moore £10 a week. The strip started on the children's page of the paper but eventually moved to the entertainment section.

From June 1984 to June 1988 the strip was also reprinted in most issues of the British comics fanzine Speakeasy. Speakeasy was itself published by Acme Press, which in 1986–1987 produced a four-issue comic book collection of the strip.

Fourteen Maxwell strips were reprinted in Splat! #2 (March 1987), published by Tom Mason's Mad Dog Graphics.

In December 2016, Moore returned to Maxwell to write and draw one further episode for the Post's final edition.

The Brazilian publisher Pipoca & Nanquim produced a single-volume translated collection of Maxwell in April 2020. It features a foreword by Eddie Campbell, an afterword by Moore, and a gallery of Maxwell illustrations by such artists as Brian Bolland, David Lloyd, and Kevin O'Neill.

== Bibliography ==
- Maxwell the Magic Cat (Northants Post, August 25, 1979–October 9, 1986)
- Maxwell the Magic Cat limited series (Acme Press, 1986–1987):
  - #1 reprints Northants Post strips from August 25, 1979, to June 20, 1981 ISBN 1-870084-00-4
  - #2 reprints Northants Post strips from June 27, 1981, to March 24, 1983 ISBN 1-870084-05-5 — includes the original Nutter's Ruin strip Moore pitched to the Northants Post
  - #3 reprints Northants Post strips from March 31, 1983, to December 12, 1984 ISBN 1-870084-10-1 — contemporary Maxwell illustration gallery by Ian Gibson, Mike Matthews, Hunt Emerson, John Bolton, Garry Leach, and Bryan Talbot
  - #4 reprints Northants Post strips from December 27, 1984, to October 9, 1986 ISBN 1-870084-20-9 — contemporary Maxwell illustration gallery by Kevin O'Neill, David Lloyd, Gilbert Shelton, John Ridgway, Graham Higgins, Phil Elliott, Rian Hughes, and Brian Bolland
- Maxwell, O Gato Mágico — Volume Único (Pipoca & Nanquim, April 2020) ISBN 978-8593695612 — in Portuguese

== See also ==
- List of published material by Alan Moore
