= James Bond (comics) =

Comics based on James Bond

Showcase #43 – Doctor No (Mar/Apr 1963)

James Bond's success after the start of the film franchise in 1962 spawned a number of comic books around the world. Initially, these were adaptations of various movies. In the late 1980s and continuing through to the mid-1990s, however, a series of original stories were also published. After a hiatus in 1996, the Bond comic book publishing license was picked up again and made a revival debut in 2015. The comics were published by various past and present companies, including DC Comics, Marvel, Eclipse Comics, Dark Horse and Dynamite Entertainment.

== English publications ==
=== Adaptations ===
The first James Bond comic book appeared in December 1962 — an adaptation of the first Bond film Dr. No. Originally published by Classics Illustrated in the United Kingdom, it was later reprinted in the United States by DC Comics as part of its Showcase anthology series in January 1963.

The next James Bond comic book did not appear for nearly 20 years, when Marvel Comics published a two-issue adaptation of the 1981 film For Your Eyes Only (which was also published in a single-issue magazine edition and a paperback release). Marvel later adapted the 1983 film Octopussy in magazine format.

In 1989 comic books featuring Bond began to appear on a semi-regular basis for a few years, starting with an adaptation of Licence to Kill published in 1989 by Acme Press/Eclipse Comics and illustrated by Mike Grell, which was published in both trade paperback and hardcover edition. Grell would go on to write the miniseries Permission to Die, the first James Bond comic book storyline not adapted from a previous work, which was published over a two-year period by Acme/Eclipse.

In 1995, Topps Comics obtained the rights to publish an adaptation of the new Bond film, GoldenEye, which was announced as a three-issue miniseries. The second issue of the miniseries was delayed due to concerns over the cover art for the issue, and ultimately Topps chose to discontinue publishing the adaptation, and also canceled plans for an ongoing James Bond comic book series.

A graphic novel adaptation of Charlie Higson's first Young Bond novel SilverFin was released in the UK on October 2, 2008. The book is illustrated by Kev Walker.

Dynamite Entertainment's senior editor Joseph Rybandt, hinted that a graphic novel adaptation of Fleming's first Bond thriller, Casino Royale is in the pipeline, while they work on an original monthly series, but it wasn't officially announced until July 2016 with Van Jensen adapting the novel closely into comic book format and Matthew Southworth illustrating it, aiming for a November release later that year. However, Southworth left the project due to "creative differences", and was replaced with Dennis Calero as the artist, while the cover artwork is provided with by Fay Dalton. After months in the pipeline, Dynamite released the graphic novel on 11 April 2018.

=== Original series ===
==== Dark Horse Comics ====
In 1992, Dark Horse Comics obtained the rights to produce James Bond comics (acquired via the UK publisher Acme Comics, formerly known as Acme Press) and issued a number of limited series and stand-alone stories that began with Serpent's Tooth, a three-issue miniseries published over the course of two years, with an original story written by Doug Moench and illustrated by Paul Gulacy. The second miniseries made of supposedly four issues debuted in 1993, called A Silent Armageddon was delivered by Simon Jowett and John M. Burns, but only two of the planned four issues were released. The miniseries, to this day, remains incomplete in its publication.

Light of My Death was the third Bond story to be published by Dark Horse Comics which, unlike its predecessors, was released alongside different intellectual property franchise titles in four issues, a period piece set in the 1960s written by Das Petrou and illustrated by John Watkiss, including a reprisal appearance of Tatiana Romanova from From Russia with Love.

Following the instalment was a Dark Horse/Acme two-issue miniseries Shattered Helix in 1994, with Jowett returning to pen the story, and the art receiving its illustration by David Jackson and David Lloyd. The next one followed in the footsteps of Light of My Death in its publication vein, released alongside an unrelated franchise title in Dark Horse Comics #25, called Minute of Midnight from Doug Moench and Russ Heath, which was supposed to be setting up a major story arc for a planned ongoing series on Dark Horse's behalf before their rights on the Bond comics were expired.

The last miniseries to be published by Dark Horse/Acme was The Quasimodo Gambit in three issues, an original experience written by Don McGregor, who completed scripting it six years prior to its publication, and illustrated by Gary Caldwell, completing its run in May 1995.

The list of comics published by Dark Horse (many with Acme Comics' packaging) includes:

- Serpent's Tooth (1992–1993) by Doug Moench and Paul Gulacy
- A Silent Armageddon (1993, incomplete) by Simon Jowett and John M. Burns
- Light of My Death (1993, appearing in Dark Horse Comics #8, #9, #10, #11) by Das Petrou and John Watkiss
- Shattered Helix (1994) by Simon Jowett, David Jackson and David Lloyd
- Minute of Midnight (1994, appearing in Dark Horse Comics #25) by Doug Moench and Russ Heath
- The Quasimodo Gambit (1995) by Don McGregor and Gary Caldwell

==== Dynamite Entertainment ====
In October 2014, Dynamite Entertainment acquired the license from Ian Fleming Publications to produce and publish a series of comic books concentrating on Fleming's literary hero in two different timelines. One will be a period piece, expanding on his days prior to the events of Casino Royale with original stories. The other, by Warren Ellis and Jason Masters with a contemporary setting, has been published as a monthly comic since November 2015. The first six-issue story arc was titled Vargr, followed by a second arc titled Eidolon. The monthly ongoing series, as revealed in October 2016, was taken over by writer Benjamin Percy. The title was announced as Black Box, written by Percy and illustrated by Rapha Lobosco.

On 18 June 2018, James Bond Origin was officially unveiled by Dynamite as a long-lasting period-piece series, of which the first issue will be making its debut in September later in the year, with the first story arc being delivered by Jeff Parker and Bob Q. It focuses on a seventeen year old Bond at the height of World War II as he bursts on his way out fighting to survive, thus leading him to make a decision that will change his life forever.

Additional standalone series are also in the pipeline, of which the first in arrival was unveiled as Hammerhead, a six-issue miniseries, bringing new creators Andy Diggle as the writer and Luca Casalanguida as the artist on board, debuting in October 2016. In February 2017, Dynamite unveiled another standalone instalment called Service by creators Kieron Gillen and Antonio Fuso, presenting a 48-page comic book set to come out in May 2017. On 17 April 2017, a new miniseries was announced with Diggle and Casalanguida, along with the rest of the crew returning from Hammerhead in a follow-up, called Kill Chain, offering many variant covers for the first issue, set to debut in the month of July. In August 2017, Dynamite unveiled yet another one-shot Bond comic to be brought by writer and illustrator Ibrahim Moustafa, titled Solstice, set for a November 2017 release. On 4 October 2017, Dynamite announced a new six-issue miniseries entitled The Body written by Ales Kot, debuting in January 2018. On 10 October 2023, Dynamite announced a new ongoing series written by Garth Ennis, debuting in January 2024.

Spin-off miniseries has also been announced in October 2016 with the role of the protagonist given to Bond's known CIA ally, Felix Leiter, starring in his own first ever adventure and solo ride, simply called Felix Leiter, written by James Robinson and illustrated by Aaron Campbell, set to come out sometime in January 2017. On 23 May 2017, another spin-off was announced, Moneypenny, which centers on M's secretary and security agent, Moneypenny herself. On 21 November 2017, a third spin-off was announced aimed for February 2018 release, a 40-page one-shot comic book centered on M himself, exploring his backstory as well as dealing with his past that comes back to haunt him, delivered by creators Declan Shalvey and P.J. Holden.

The list of comics published by Dynamite Entertainment includes:

- James Bond (monthly series) (2015–Present):
  - Vargr (2015) by Warren Ellis and Jason Masters
  - Eidolon (2016) by Warren Ellis and Jason Masters
- Black Box (2017) by Benjamin Percy and Rapha Lobosco
- Hammerhead (2016) by Andy Diggle and Luca Casalanguida
- Service (2017) by Kieron Gillen and Antonio Fuso
- Kill Chain (2017) by Andy Diggle and Luca Casalanguida
- Solstice (2017) by Ibrahim Moustafa
- The Body (2018) written by Ales Kot, illustrated by Luca Casalanguida, Antonio Fuso, Rapha Lobosco, Eoin Marron and Hayden Sherman
- James Bond Origin (2018) by Jeff Parker and Bob Q

Spin-offs:

- Felix Leiter (2017) by James Robinson and Aaron Campbell
- Moneypenny (2017) by Jody Houser and Jacob Edgar
- M (2018) by Declan Shalvey and P.J. Holden

== Swedish publications ==
Swedish comic book publisher Semic Press started a James Bond comic book magazine in 1965, which was simultaneously published in Norwegian, Danish, and Finnish editions. Originally, the contents were derived from the James Bond newspaper strips; translated and edited to fit the comic book format. As time passed the archive of newspaper strip stories was depleted and was reprinted over and over again.

By the early 1980s, Semic decided to acquire rights to produce their own Bond stories directly for the comic book. The first James Bond story produced by Semic was published in Swedish James Bond #1/1982 (Note: Scandinavian comic magazines usually restart the numbering each year.) It was called "Den gyllene triangeln" ("The Golden Triangle"), drawn by Escolano and written by Norwegians Terje Nordberg and Eirik Ildahl under the pseudonym "Johann Vlaanderen." About half a dozen new 24-page black & white stories were produced each year. The main artists were Sarompas, Josep Gual, and Manuel Carmona. The main writers were Sverre Årnes, Jack Sutter, and Bill Harrington.

Between 1982 and 1991, Semic produced 42 comic magazine stories and five (graphic novel) albums, of which three were based on Bond movies. Two of the albums were completely original, never having appeared in the newspaper. Some of the Swedish James Bond comic issues used material from Dark Horse Comics' Bond comics, including one limited series and the 1994 Shattered Helix series.

Eight of these issues were also published in the Netherlands by Semic Press. Attempts were made to sell the Semic Bond stories to other European countries — Spain and Germany for example — but this was limited to only a few episodes.

The episode "Operation: Blücher" from James Bond #12/1984 was written by Norwegian Sverre Årnes and centered on a sunken Nazi ship outside Norway. The plot of this story (minus James Bond) was later adapted into the script for the movie Blücher, released in 1988.

== See also ==
- James Bond comic strips
- Outline of James Bond
