= Jim Baikie =

British comics artist

- Born: James George Baikie; 28 February 1940 Orkney, Scotland
- Died: 29 December 2017 (aged 77) Orkney, Scotland
- Areas: Penciller, Inker
- Notable works: Skizz

James George Baikie (/ˈbeɪki/; 28 February 1940 – 29 December 2017) was a Scottish comics artist best known for his work with Alan Moore on Skizz. He was also a musician.

== Biography ==
Baikie served as a Corporal with the Royal Air Force in 1956–1963 before joining a printing company. Baikie joined Morgan-Grampian studio as an artist in 1964 and was an illustrator for the National Savings Committee in 1965–1966. Balkie was a bass guitarist in bands James Fenda and the Vulcans and Compass among others.

Baikie began his comics career illustrating the romance comic Valentine for Fleetway. Over the next twenty years, he built a solid reputation working for TV comics such as Look-in, including adaptations of The Monkees and Star Trek, all scripted by Angus Allan. He worked extensively in British girls' comics such as June and Jinty. In the 1980s, Baikie drew The Twilight World in Warrior.

In Britain, he is probably best known for collaborating with Alan Moore on Skizz. Baikie was so attached to the character that he went on to both write and illustrate Skizz II and Skizz III for 2000AD. 2000 AD spin-off Crisis saw Baikie produce the art for the New Statesmen story.

Baikie also worked in the United States, on superhero comics such as Batman and The Spectre. In 1986, he co-created Electric Warrior with writer Doug Moench. A new collaboration with Alan Moore was the First American serial in Moores Tomorrow Stories.

== Personal life ==
Baikie married his wife Wendy (née Lawson) in 1961. The couple had five daughters: Jacqueline, Jane, Vanessa, Caitrian, and Ellen. At the time of Baikie's death, they had 12 grandchildren and two great-grandchildren.

== Awards ==
- 1983 Won Society of Strip Illustration's "Best British Adventure Artist" award
- 2000: Won "Best Anthology" Eisner Award for Tomorrow Stories

== Bibliography ==
Comics work includes:

- Marilyn
  - Various strips from c.4 September 1965
- Valentine
  - Various strips from 1964 to 6 September 1969
- Lady Penelope
  - The Monkees
- Star Trek (in TV21 & Joe 90, 1970)
- June
  - Gymnast Jinty, 1972
  - Tilly's Magic Tranny, 1973
- Jinty:
  - "Left-Out Linda", 1974
  - "The Kat and Mouse Game", 1975
  - "Face The Music, Flo!", 1975
  - "Ping-Pong Paula", 1975
  - "Miss No-Name", 1976
  - "Willa on Wheels", 1976
  - "Rose Among the Thornes", 1976
  - "Spell of the Spinning Wheel", 1977
  - "Fran'll Fix It!", 1977
  - "Two Mothers for Maggie", 1977
  - "Wild Rose", 1978
  - "Fran'll Fix It!" (sequel), 1978
  - "The Forbidden Garden", 1979
  - "Village of Fame", 1979
  - "White Water", 1980
- Tammy
  - Glen - Lonely Dog on a Quest 1971
- Judy
  - Trader Tess, 1977
  - First Time Faith, 1979
- CHiPS (in Look-In, 1981)
- Skizz:
  - "Skizz" (with Alan Moore, in 2000 AD #308–330, 1983)
  - "Alien Cultures" (script and art, in 2000 AD #767–775, 1992)
  - "Skizz Book 3" (script and art, in 2000 AD #912–927, 1994–1995)
- Twilight World (in Warrior #14–17, 1983)
- Bloodfang (in Eagle #116–127, 1983)
- Fall Guy (in Look-In, 1984)
- Judge Dredd
  - "The Switch" (with John Wagner/Alan Grant, in 2000 AD #369, 1984)
  - "Oz" (with John Wagner/Alan Grant, in 2000 AD #546 and 569–570, 1987–1988)
  - "Hitman (with John Wagner/Alan Grant, in 2000 AD #571–573, 1988)
  - "In the Bath" (with John Wagner, in 2000 AD #626, 1989)
  - "Little Spuggy's Xmas" (with John Wagner, in 2000 AD #658, 1989)
  - "Midnite's Children" (with John Wagner, in Judge Dredd Megazine #1.01–1.05, 1990–1991)
  - "An Everyday Disaster" (with John Wagner, in 2000 AD #1309, 2002)
- New Statesmen (with John Smith, in Crisis #1–4, #9–12 and #28, 1988–1989)
- Vigilante #17–18 (with Alan Moore, DC Comics, 1985)
- Electric Warrior #1–18 (with Doug Moench, DC Comics, 1986–1987)
- "Clive Barker's Nightbreed" #1–4 (with Alan Grant, Epic comics, 1990)
- Amadeus Wolf: "Cursitor Doom - The Man Who Died Every Day" (with John Tomlinson, in 2000AD Action Special, 1992)
- Tharg's Future Shocks: "Hot Iron" (script and art, in 2000 AD #797, 1992)
- Blackmask (with Brian Augustyn, 3-issue mini-series, DC Comics, 1995)
- Star Wars: Empire's End (with Tom Veitch, 3-issue mini-series, Dark Horse Comics)
- "First American and U.S.Angel" (with Alan Moore, in Tomorrow Stories #1–12, America's Best Comics, 1999–2003)
- Deathblow By Blows (with Alan Moore, Wildstorm, 2000)
- The Victorian #8–11 (with Len Wein, Penny Farthing Press, 2001)
- "The First American: How Come Nobody Likes The First American These Days?" (with Alan Moore, in Tomorrow Stories Special #2, America's Best Comics, 2006)
