= Dennis Janke =

American comic book artist (born 1950)

- Born: April 13, 1950 (age 76) Cleveland, Ohio, U.S.
- Area: Inker
- Pseudonym: Z. Capistance
- Notable works: Superman: The Man of Steel; The Adventures of Superman; Superman
- Collaborators: Jon Bogdanove; Jerry Ordway

Dennis Janke (born April 13, 1950) is an American comic book artist who was active in the industry from the mid-1980s to the mid-2000s, primarily as an inker. He is known for his work on the DC Comics character Superman, particularly his nine-year run as inker on Superman: The Man of Steel.

A freelancer, Janke worked for both DC and Marvel Comics during his career, occasionally penciling covers and stories, but mostly focusing on "finish inking" over other artists' pencils. Janke has worked extensively with pencilers Jon Bogdanove and Jerry Ordway, creating Doomsday with Ordway. With Mark Gruenwald and Paul Neary, Janke co-created Armadillo.

In his career, Janke has also worked on dozens of independent comic books and underground comix, including his own self-published series, Flaming Baloney (published with James R. Blevins c. 1975).

== Biography ==
=== Early life ===
Janke was born on April 13, 1950, in Cleveland, Ohio. He earned his BFA from the Cleveland Institute of Art.

=== Career ===
Janke's first published work was a 1974 illustration in DC Comics' House of Mystery, but his professional career took off a decade later when he was hired to ink Paul Neary on Marvel's Captain America, which he did for two years.

Moving over to DC Comics in 1987, Janke inked the final nine issues of Electric Warrior over Jim Baikie's pencils. Next, he inked the four-issue mini-series The Phantom, pencilled by Joe Orlando and written by Peter David. Around the same time he became the regular inker on The Adventures of Superman and Superman, mostly inking Jerry Ordway's pencils. He then spent nine years as the inker of Superman: The Man of Steel, mostly over Jon Bogdanove. Bogdanove and Janke also illustrated many covers for the Steel solo title during this period. As inker on Superman: The Man of Steel, Janke contributed to, and benefited from the success of, the best-selling 1992-1993 "The Death of Superman" story arc.

Janke's final major run as an inker was for The Spectre in 2002–2003 (over Norm Breyfogle's pencils). Since 2003, Janke's published comics credits have been rare.

Janke is currently at work on a graphic novel.

== Personal life ==
Janke is an amateur poet. He lives in Maine, in a house he was able to pay for with royalties from his work on "The Death of Superman."

== Bibliography ==
=== As writer ===
- (with James R. Blevins) (as Z. Capistance) "Stargazer," Witzend #12 (Wonderful Publishing Company, 1982) — also art
- (with Jerry Ordway) Adventures of Superman #484 (DC Comics, Nov. 1991) — also inks
- (with Roger Stern) Action Comics #671 (DC Comics, Nov. 1991) — also inks
- (with Louise Simonson) Superman: The Man of Steel #6 (DC Comics, Dec. 1991) — also inks
- (with Louise Simonson) "Doomsday for the Fifth Dimension," Action Comics Annual #6 (DC Comics, 1994) — also pencils and Inks

=== As penciler ===
- Adventures of Superman #496 (DC Comics, Nov. 1992) — also co-plot and inks
- "Gangbuster of Suicide Slum," The Legacy of Superman #1 (DC Comics, Mar. 1993)
- "Prologue: Communion," Doomsday Annual #1 (DC Comics, 1995) — also inks
- "Epilogue: Requiem," Doomsday Annual #1 (DC Comics, 1995) — also inks

=== As inker ===
- Captain America (Marvel Comics, 1984-1986)
- Masters of the Universe #1–5 (Star Comics, 1986–1987)
- Electric Warrior #11–18 (DC Comics, 1987)
- The Phantom limited series (DC Comics, 1988)
- The Adventures of Superman (DC Comics, 1988–1989)
- Superman (DC Comics, 1989–1991, 1993)
- "Circle of Fear," Spelljammer #6 (DC Comics/TSR, Feb. 1991)
- Superman: The Man of Steel (DC Comics, 1991-1999)
- "Underworld Unleashed" limited series (DC Comics, Nov.–Dec. 1995)
- Superman's Nemesis: Lex Luthor limited series (DC Comics, Mar.–June 1999)
- Domination Factor: Avengers limited series (Marvel Comics, Nov. 1999–Feb. 2000)
- Batman: The Doom That Came to Gotham limited series (DC Comics, Nov. 2000–Jan. 2001)
- The Spectre (DC Comics, 2002-2003)
- Human Defense Corps issues #4-6 (DC Comics, Oct.–Dec. 2003)

Preceded by Roy Richardson	Captain America inker 1984–1986	Succeeded by John Beatty
Preceded by Pablo Marcos	Electric Warrior inker 1987	Succeeded by N/A (series ended)
Preceded by John Beatty	The Adventures of Superman inker 1988–1989	Succeeded by Art Thibert
Preceded by Brett Breeding	Superman inker 1989–1991	Succeeded by Brett Breeding
Preceded by N/A	Superman: The Man of Steel inker 1991–1999	Succeeded by Tom Nguyen
Preceded by Jim Royal	The Spectre inker 2002–2003	Succeeded by N/A (series ended)
