= Serenade (comics) =

British weekly romance comic

- The cover of Serenade dated 5 January 1963. Art by Ángel Badía Camps.

Publication information
- Publisher: Fleetway Publications; 1962 to 1963
- Schedule: Weekly (Mondays)
- Format: Ongoing series
- Publication date: 22 September 1962 – 9 February 1963
- No. of issues: 21 (Note: Some sources report 25; however, there are only 21 weeks between the first and last issues and only 21 issues have been confirmed by collectors.)

Creative team
- Artist(s): Ángel Badía Camps; Frank M. Lea; Jorge Longarón; Carlos Prunés
- Editor(s): Robert Lewis

Serenade was a British weekly anthology romance comic published by Fleetway Publications from 22 September 1962 to 9 February 1963 (Note: British comics of the time featured their off sale date on the cover). Intended as a companion title to the company's successful Valentine with lavish production values, the comic failed to find an audience and was cancelled after 21 issues.

== Creation ==
Amalgamated Press had found considerable success with a string of romance comics aimed at British teenage girls in the late 1950s, beginning with Marilyn and followed by Roxy and Valentine. At their peak the titles sold up to 500,000 copies, and the company's formidable stable of comics was a key factor in the company being taken over by the Mirror Group in 1959, which led to the juvenile magazine department being rebranded Fleetway Publications. The new owners began to look at launching new titles, including the girls' comics Princess and June, humour title Buster and educational magazine Look and Learn.

Serenade was devised to join the romance comics, under the auspices of Marilyn creator Robert Lewis. It featured high production values compared to its stablemates, with a full cover colour at a time when the other titles were using black-and-white with a single colour overlay, and made extensive use of European art agencies, particularly the Spanish artists of S.I. Bardon. The first story of each issue started on the front cover, with a large splash image at a time when British comics largely focused on fitting in as many frames as possible onto a page. The colour covers have since made Serenade highly collectible.

Inside, the stories were a mix of standalone and serialised romances, typically of two to three pages an issue; while most featured different characters each time, detective Mike O'Hara would recur. The first issue's editorial introduced the comic's features team - music correspondent Johnny Solo; agony aunt Penny; trivia expert and dogsbody Clancy; fashion writer Gillian; and The Editor's indispensable secretary Sally. Aside from the cover, the rest of the comic was in black-and-white; the format was a 32-page newsprint weekly, priced at 6d (the same as Valentine).

Artists contributing to the series included Spaniards Jesús Blasco, Ángel Badía Camps, Florenci Clavé, Roberto González Casarrubio, Carlos Freixas, Eugenio Giner, Jorge Longarón, Josep Maria Miralles, Antonio Bosch Penalva, Carlos Prunés and Manfred Sommer; Italian team Enrico Bagnoli and Antonio Toldo; and British talent such as Shirley Bellwood, Rab Hamilton, Frank Jarvis, Frank M. Lea, Roy Newby and Joan Riley.

== Publishing history ==
The first issue of Serenade was promoted in Roxy, continuing the serial "Bon Voyage" from that title. It included a free flexi disc record featuring a message recorded by Cliff Richard; the second included a booklet containing '101 New Lights On... Cliff Elvis Adam' while the third included 'Helen Shapiro's Hair & Eye Book'. The print run for the first issue was announced at 600,000.

Despite such offerings, Serenade entered into a crowded marketplace - in addition to Fleetway's other romance titles, DC Thomson were fielding the successful Romeo and Jackie, while the explosion of popular music and fashion saw many of the genre's readers tempted away to the growing number of magazines catering for them. As such, Serenade failed to find enough of an audience to keep to its break-even point, and after 21 issues the comic was merged into Valentine in February 1963.

Since 2018, the rights to Serenade have been owned by Rebellion Publishing. In 2023, 2000 AD artist and comics historian David Roach curated an anthology of romance comics for Rebellion's Treasury of British Comics label called A Very British Affair: The Best of Classic Romance Comics in 2023; the collection included the story "Love? Not For Me!" from the 26 January 1963 issue of Serenade, as well as reproducing several of the comic's covers - the splash image for the 13 October 1962 issue, by Badía Camps, was chosen as the cover for the collection.

== Collected editions ==
Title	ISBN	Publisher	Release date	Contents
A Very British Affair: The Best of Classic Romance Comics	9781786187710	Rebellion Publishing	21 March 2023	Material from Serenade 26 January 1963 (a/o)
