= Black Mask =

Black Mask may refer to:

== Film ==
- Black Mask (1935 film), a British crime film directed by Ralph Ince
- The Black Mask (1952 film), an Italian historical adventure film
- Black Mask (1996 film), a movie starring Jet Li, based on the manhua of same name by Li Chi-Tak
  - Black Mask 2: City of Masks, 2002 sequel movie to the 1996 film

== Literature ==
- The Black Mask, a 1905 collection of short stories by E. W. Hornung concerning the gentleman thief A. J. Raffles
- Black Mask (magazine), a pulp magazine launched in 1920 by H. L. Mencken and George Jean Nathan
- Blackmask (comic book), a 1993 three-issue mini-series from DC Comics set in the 1950s

== Characters ==
- Black Mask (character), a foe of the Batman in the DC Comics universe
- Black Mask, a character in Hikari Sentai Maskman
- Black Mask, a minor character in Mad Max: Fury Road

== Other uses ==
- Black Mask (anarchists), the original name of the situationist group later known as Up Against the Wall Motherfuckers
- Black Mask Studios, a comic book and graphic novel publishing company
- Die schwarze Maske (The Black Mask), an opera by Krzysztof Penderecki

== See also ==
- The Lady in the Black Mask, a 1917 novel by Tom Gallon
- Terror of the Black Mask, a 1963 Italian-French adventure film
