= Brian Augustyn =

American comic book editor and writer (1954–2022)

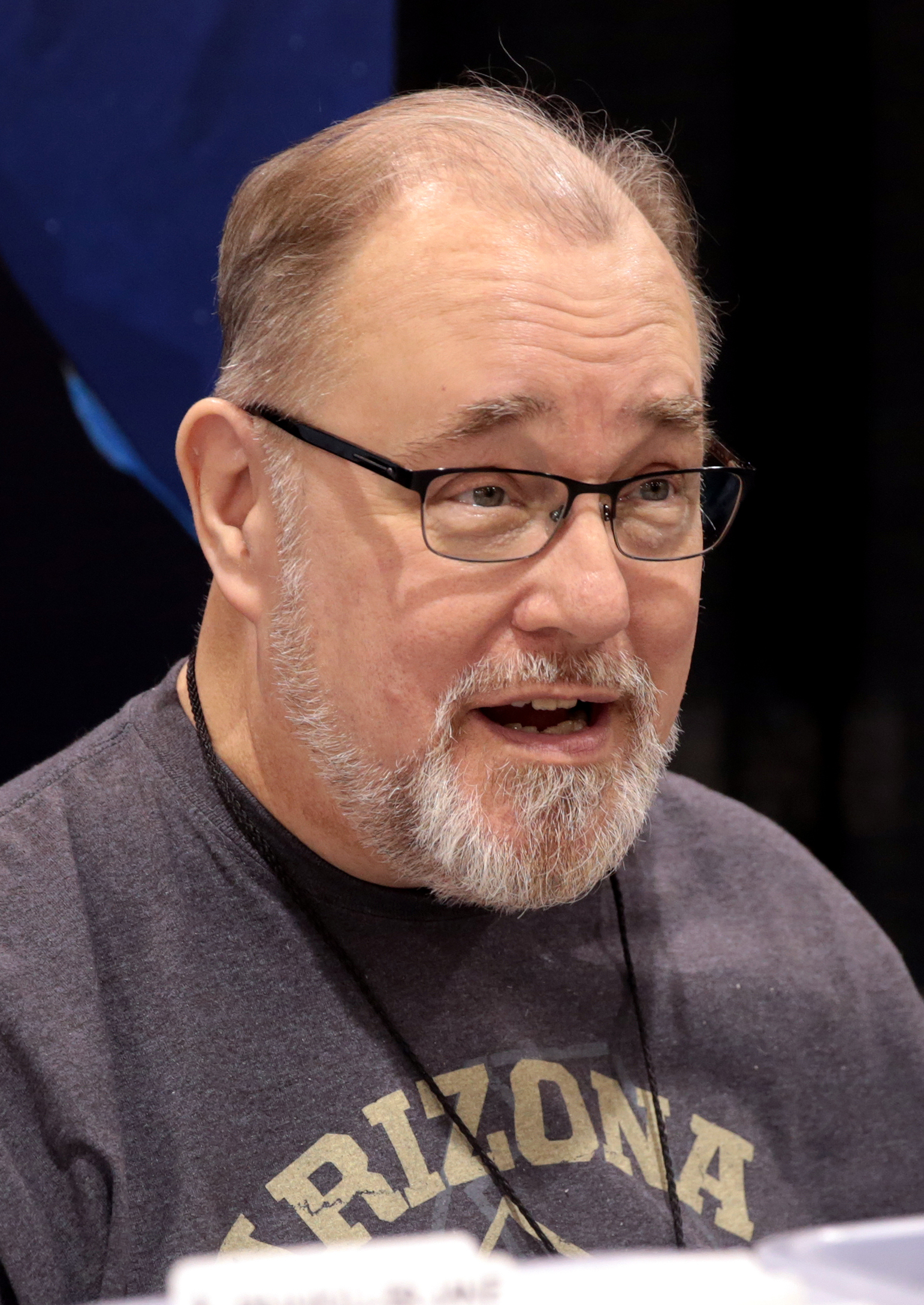
- Augustyn at the 2018 Phoenix Comic Fest
- Born: November 2, 1954 Chicago, Illinois, U.S.
- Died: February 1, 2022 (aged 67) Phoenix, Arizona, U.S.
- Areas: Writer, Editor
- Notable works: The Flash
- Awards: Wizard Fan Award, 1994

Brian Augustyn (November 2, 1954 – February 1, 2022) was an American comic book editor and writer. He often worked as editor or co-writer with writer Mark Waid, such as on The Flash in the 1990s. He wrote Gotham by Gaslight – which imagines Batman tracking Jack the Ripper – the prototype of DC's Elseworlds imprint, which featured versions of their characters in alternate settings.

== Career ==
=== Editing ===
Augustyn got his start in the industry in 1986 as an editor for Tru Studios' Trollords. He then edited Syphons and Speed Racer for NOW Comics in 1987. In 1988, he joined DC Comics, starting out as a co-editor on Action Comics during its period as a weekly title, and later The Flash, Justice League, and the Impact Comics line of titles.

As editor of The Flash beginning in 1989, Augustyn hired Mark Waid as writer in 1992, which led to an acclaimed eight-year run. Other Augustyn/Waid editor/writer partnerships included The Comet (DC/Impact, 1992) and Flash spin-off Impulse (DC, 1995–1996). He won the Wizard Fan Award for Favorite Editor in 1994.

He served as the managing editor of Visionary Comics Studio. He worked as story editor for publisher Red Giant Entertainment and their Giant-Size Comics line of free print comic book titles which debuted in 2014.

=== Writing ===
As a solo writer, Augustyn worked on DC's Gotham by Gaslight, its sequel Batman: Master of the Future, and Black Condor; Marvel's Imperial Guard; Wildstorm Productions' Out There and Crimson; and Dreamwave Productions's Mega Man.

As co-writers, Augustyn and Mark Waid scripted The Crusaders for DC/Impact in 1992, Painkiller Jane and Ash: Cinder & Smoke for Event Comics in 1997, X-O Manowar, vol. 2, for Valiant Comics in 1997–1998, and JLA: Year One for DC in 1998–1999. After leaving his position as editor in 1996, Augustyn teamed with Waid to co-write The Flash in 1996–1997 and 1998–2000. They collaborated on The Life Story of the Flash graphic novel and co-wrote the story in The Flash #142 (October 1998) in which Wally West married Linda Park.

In 2014, Red Giant Entertainment announced that Augustyn was scripting a new Amped comic series which debuted in November as part of the monthly Giant-Sized line.

== Personal life and death ==
Augustyn was born on November 2, 1954. He died from a stroke on February 1, 2022, at the age of 67 and is survived by his wife Nadine and daughters Carrie and Allie.

== Bibliography ==
Comics work includes:

=== As writer ===
==== Archie Comics ====
- New Riverdale:
  - Archie: 1941 #1–5 (co-written by Augustyn and Mark Waid, art by Peter Krause, 2018–2019) collected as Archie: 1941 (tpb, 144 pages, 2019, ISBN 1-68255-823-1)
  - Archie: 1955 #1–5 (co-written by Augustyn and Mark Waid, art by Tom Grummett (#1–2), Rick Burchett (#2 and 5), Ray-Anthony Height (#3 and 5), Derek Charm (#4) and Joe Eisma (#5), 2019–2020)

==== Dark Horse Comics ====
- Hell #1–4
- Star Wars Tales #15

==== DC Comics ====
- Batman:
  - Detective Comics Annual #2: "Blood Secrets" (co-written by Augustyn and Mark Waid, art by Val Semeiks, 1989) collected in Batman: The Dark Knight Detective Volume 4 (tpb, 328 pages, 2021, ISBN 1-77950-749-6)
  - Batman: Legends of the Dark Knight Annual #4: "Citizen Wayne" (co-written by Augustyn and Mark Waid, art by Joe Staton, 1994) collected in Superman/Batman: Alternate Histories (tpb, 224 pages, 1996, ISBN 1-56389-263-4)
  - Gotham by Gaslight (with Mike Mignola, one-shot, DC Comics, 1989)
  - Batman: Master of the Future
- Black Condor #1–12
- Black Mask (with Jim Baikie, 2-issue mini-series, DC Comics, 1995)
- Crimson (with Humberto Ramos, 24 issue series, Wildstorm Comics, 1998)
- Firebrand #1–9
- Gross Point #1: "Welcome to Gross Point" (co-written by Augustyn and Mark Waid, art by S. M. Taggart, anthology, 1997)
- Justice League of America:
  - JLA: Year One #1–12 (co-written by Augustyn and Mark Waid, art by Barry Kitson, 1998) collected as JLA: Year One (tpb, 320 pages, 1999, ISBN 1-56389-512-9; hc, 336 pages, 2017, ISBN 1-4012-7086-7)
- Out There (with Humberto Ramos, Wildstorm Comics, 1998)
- Robin + Impulse (co-written by Waid and Brian Augustyn, art by John Royle, one-shot, 1996)
- Showcase '93 #12
- Showcase '94 #2–4, 10–12
- Showcase '96 #4
- The Flash:
  - The Flash vol. 2 Issues #118–150, 152–159 and 162 are co-written by Waid and Brian Augustyn, 1991–2000) collected as:
    - The Flash by Mark Waid Book Six (collects #119–129, tpb, 440 pages, 2019, ISBN 1-4012-9380-8)
      - Includes the "Overrun" short story (co-written by Augustyn and Mark Waid, art by Óscar Jiménez) from Showcase '96 #12 (anthology, 1996)
      - Includes the "Present Tense" short story (co-written by Augustyn and Mark Waid, art by Paul Ryan) from DC Universe Holiday Bash #1 (anthology, 1997)
      - Includes Flash/Green Lantern: Faster Friends #2 (co-written by Augustyn and Mark Waid, art by Val Semeiks, 1997)
      - Includes the Flash + Nightwing one-shot (co-written by Augustyn and Mark Waid, art by Eduardo Barreto, 1997)
    - The Flash by Mark Waid Book Seven (collects #142–150 and 1,000,000, tpb, 448 pages, 2020, ISBN 1-77950-019-X)
      - Includes the "A Run of Luck" short story (co-written by Waid and Brian Augustyn, art by Kenneth Martinez) from The Flash Secret Files & Origins #1 (1997)
      - Includes the "Burning Secrets" (art by Jim Aparo) and "The Sacrifice" (co-written by Waid and Brian Augustyn, art by Will Rosado) short stories from Speed Force (anthology one-shot, 1997)
      - Includes The Life Story of the Flash prose novel (co-written by Waid and Brian Augustyn, illustrated by Gil Kane and Joe Staton, hc 96 pages, 1997, ISBN 1-56389-365-7; sc, 1998, ISBN 1-56389-389-4)
    - The Flash by Mark Waid Book Eight (includes #152–159 and 162, tpb, 400 pages, 2021, ISBN 1-77951-010-1)
      - Also collects the "Twenty-First Century Rogue" short story (co-written by Waid and Brian Augustyn, art by Ron Lim) from The Flash Secret Files & Origins #2 (1999)
      - Also collects The Flash vol. 2 #151 (framing sequence co-written by Waid and Brian Augustyn and drawn by Paul Pelletier; issue written by Joe Casey and drawn by Duncan Rouleau, 1999)
      - Also collects The Flash vol. 2 #160 (written by Brian Augustyn, drawn by Scott Kolins, 2000)

==== Dreamwave Productions ====
- Duel Masters #1–8
- MegaMan #1–4 (Dreamwave Productions, 2003)
- Warlands: Dark Tide Rising #1–6

==== Impact Comics ====
Titles published by DC Comics' Impact imprint include:

- The Crusaders #1–4, 8 (co-written by Augustyn and Mark Waid, art by Rags Morales and Jeffrey Moore (#8), 1992)
- Crucible #1–6 (co-written by Augustyn and Mark Waid, art by Chuck Wojtkiewicz, 1993)

==== Marvel Comics ====
- Imperial Gurad #1–3 (1997)

==== Other publishers ====
Titles published by various comics publishers include:

- Acclaim:
  - X-O Manowar vol. 2 #1–6 (co-written by Augustyn and Mark Waid, art by Sean Chen and Scot Eaton (#5–6), 1997)
    - Issues #7–13 are written by Brian Augustyn and drawn by Scot Eaton, with Waid credited as "story consultant".
  - Operation: Stormbreaker (co-written by Augustyn and Mark Waid, art by Doug Braithwaite, one-shot, 1997)
- Event:
  - Ash (co-written by Augustyn and Mark Waid, art by Humberto Ramos):
    - Ash #½ (untitled six-page story on pages 7–12, Wizard, 1997)
    - Ash: Cinder and Smoke #1–6 (1997)
  - Painkiller Jane (co-written by Augustyn and Mark Waid, art by Rick Leonardi):
    - Painkiller Jane #1–5 (1997) collected as Essential Painkiller Jane (tpb, 216 pages, Dynamite, 2007, ISBN 1-933305-97-5)
    - Vampirella/Painkiller Jane: "Miss Hemoglobin 1998" (one-shot, Harris, 1998)
- Legend of the Sage #1–4 (Chaos! Comics, 2001)

==== As editor ====
- Action Comics #615–622, 636–642
- Action Comics Weekly #601–642
- Bugs Bunny #1–3
- Blood and Shadows #1–4
- El Diablo #1, 9, 15
- Elongated Man #1–4
- Extreme Justice #0–6
- Green Arrow (vol. 2) #4–20
- Hawkworld #1–3
- Justice League America #0, 61–100, 105–106, 108–113, Annual #6–7
- Justice League Task Force #0–17, 19, 36
- Justice League International #51–68, Annual #4–5
- Justice League Europe #36–50
- Justice League Quarterly #5–11, 13, 15–17
- JLX #1
- Justice Society of America #1–10
- Impulse #1–16, Annual #1
- Metamorpho #1–3
- Outlaws #1–8
- Plastic Man #1–4
- Starman #13–25
- The Comet vol. 2 #1–6, 1991–1992)
- The Darkstars #1–15
- The Fly #1–6
- The Phantom #7–13
- The Ray #0–28
- The Shadow Strikes #1, 21, 23–24
- Triumph #1–4
- Wonder Woman (vol. 2) #67–84

Collected editions:

- Associate editor on collections edited by Mike Gold:
  - The Greatest Batman Stories Ever Told (with Mark Waid, hc, 352 pages, 1988, ISBN 0-930289-35-8; tpb, 1989, ISBN 0-446-39123-9)
  - The Greatest Joker Stories Ever Told (with Mark Waid, hc, 288 pages, 1988, ISBN 0-930289-36-6; tpb, 1989, ISBN 0-446-39125-5)
  - The Greatest Golden Age Stories Ever Told (with Mark Waid and Robert Greenberger, hc, 292 pages, 1990, ISBN 0-930289-57-9)

Preceded by Barbara Kesel	The Flash vol. 2 editor 1989–1996	Succeeded by Paul Kupperberg
Preceded by Mark Waid	The Flash vol. 2 writer 1996–1997 (with Mark Waid)	Succeeded by Grant Morrison and Mark Millar
Preceded by Bob Layton	X-O Manowar vol. 2 writer 1997–1998 (with Mark Waid)	Succeeded by Dwayne McDuffie
Preceded by Mark Millar	The Flash vol. 2 writer 1998–2000 (with Mark Waid)	Succeeded by Pat McGreal
