= James Bond 007: The Quasimodo Gambit =

- James Bond 007: The Quasimodo Gambit #1 (1995). cover art by Chris Moeller.

Publication information
- Publisher: Dark Horse Comics
- Genre: Spy; Action/Adventure
- Publication date: January 1995 – May 1995
- No. of issues: 3
- Main character(s): James Bond

Creative team
- Written by: Don McGregor
- Artist(s): Gary Caldwell
- Letterer(s): Elitta Fell
- Editor(s): Edward Martin III; Dick Hansom; Robert Conte

James Bond 007: The Quasimodo Gambit is a 1995 spy thriller comic book packaged by Acme Comics and published by Dark Horse Comics that features Ian Fleming's secret agent James Bond in the lead. Serialized in three issues, the story is written by Don McGregor and illustrated by Gary Caldwell.

The Quasimodo Gambit was the last Bond comic book to be published by Dark Horse before Topps Comics took over the publishing rights to adapt GoldenEye in 1996, with McGregor as the writer.

== Plot ==
A recent panic from a group of mercenaries cites an arms dealer known as Rifle as a target on behalf of the British Intelligence who has been selling smuggled goods to an unidentified source of buyers, for which Agent 007, James Bond is sent to put a stop to the change of hands with the aid of a Jamaican secret service agent, Nebula Valentine. As they crawl on the shores of a warehouse which was serving as the location of the meeting between the seller and the unknown buyer, Bond attempts to study the place before submitting an assault on Rifle, accompanied by other operatives under the command of his ally, Nebula. On the other side of the region, two individualistic mercenaries named Maximilian "Quasimodo" Steel and his colleague, Ernest "Light Touch" Force, review the abandoned site in the presence of their employer, Reverend Elias Hazelwood, an American pastor.

Rifle arrives in a truck at midnight, with all the weapons contained at the back of the transportation vehicle, starting to perform the exchange. With the operation exposed, Bond makes his move and tries to arrest the arms dealer, allowing the assault team to attack and apprehend everyone in the act. A firefight ensues between the mercenaries and the agents, with Bond himself caught in a brutal clash with Quasimodo in the containment, discovering the presence of countless automatic weapons stashed in boxes that could supply an army. During the action, Rifle is killed by his own truck stolen by Ernest Force who drives it away, which has both Bond and Quasimodo within. After the brawl that nearly would have led fatal outcomes to either of them, Bond manages to escape by jumping into a river nearby, surviving the bullets fired at him by Quasimodo and his accomplice.

After Nebula captures Hazelwood as a suspect, brought to the Jamaican authorities succeeding the incident, the Reverend threatens to file a complaint against her for violent harassment against him and accusing the man without a proof of his link to the gunmen, and is set free due to lack of charges. Unbeknownst to the local Commissioner, Bond authorizes an encoded message to be directly sent to CIA agent Felix Leiter, demanding information and reports of unofficial interests on Reverend Hazelwood, who apparently is the leader of a false religious organization called Disciples of The Heavenly Way, for which Bond suspects he is buying weapons for a possible a terrorist attack.

A night later, Bond infiltrates the main headquarters of Disciples of The Heavenly Way in Jamaica to investigate and gain a clue of whatever Reverend Hazelwood was up to, only to discover that the entire place was, in fact, an army training base. He uncovers a blueprint of an unidentified office building floor and a learns about a meeting with a ganja drugs dealer called Conan "The King" Lash. Meanwhile, Quasimodo has a deal struck with Lash already, who is smuggling explosives disguised as ganja grass boxes and is planning to have them bordered across The United States.

Bond and Nebula travel to the mountains where Lash's compound is found at, in order to learn about the extraction point of the smuggled goods. With the leader of the quarters absent, 007 takes all the information out of the dealer's deputy by force and finds out the place for the goods to be delivered at is called Twisted River in the Georgian swamps in the pace of two nights. Bond later learns of Quasimodo's identity through the description he has given the British authorities for identification, he warns his CIA counterpart, Felix Leiter, of an imminent attack planned by Hazelwood, whom Leiter will be keeping an eye on.

En route to intercept the delivery of munitions at the river, Bond is teamed up with the local coast guards and pursues ganja smuggling ships, with its sailors throwing them overboard so Quasimodo and his men will come to collect their merchandise later from the water. Witnessing them out of suspicions, 007 jumps after them and explores that the grass box is no more than a cover for hidden explosives within. However, he is captured by Ernest Force on the shores and subdued. Quasimodo sadistically tortures Bond in order to gain intelligence out of him, explaining that whatever his adversaries might do to stop him, he is doing God's work by attacking The Beast. Injecting leeches on Bond's skin, he leaves the bugs to drain the blood out of the captive and departs with his merchandise. Bond, overpowering the pain, breaks free and manages to escape once again, leaving no trace behind.

In the next morning, Leiter and Nebula attend the New York Jamaican conference where Reverend Hazelwood was going to be present, whom the agents follow after the event to track his movements, only to be attacked by Quasimodo and his men, who brutally injure Nebula for interfering in their business. Frustrated by the vicious act, Bond takes the matter personally in his hands, promising a payback for how they treated Nebula. Following the clues left behind by past conversations he heard from Quasimodo earlier, the office building blueprint and the mention of The Beast based on religious cults, as well as tracking a lead that has a connection with the Reverend, one woman called Gretchen Blair, tracing her to a building in the Rockfeller Center had three sixes as its number of the address, which leads 007 to realize the attack was going to take place in there and that Blair is merely a mole planted within.

With the aid of Leiter piloting a helicopter, as they witness Quasimodo, Reverend Hazelwood and Ernest Force unloading set of explosives at one of the floors in the building, Bond, dressed in a heavy combat gear, engages in a firefight with the mercenaries by surprise. As the battle is afoot, 007 encounters Ernest Force and they collide with fists in a long lasting wrestle. Before more time was wasted, however, Force detonates himself, giving Bond a little time to take cover and avoid the blast, the whole floor is demolished, fulfilling Hazelwood's plan who watches the explosion out of the building moments before he disappears. Enraged, Bond is left with no choice and objective but pursue Quasimodo and kill him for once and for all to prevent similar future acts of terrorism to be caused by the mercenary and his accomplices. Cornering him at a rooftop, Bond and Quasimodo clash for one last time, providing one another with wounds, only for the former to end up getting the upper hand as he throws the mercenary off the ledge who falls to his death. Sometime later, during the process of healing from his wounds, Bond comforts Nebula, telling her that he settled the score with the man who did her wrong, as they embrace each other with passionate sense of romance.

== Characters ==
- James Bond: A British Secret Intelligence Service agent from the 00-Section sent to investigate unusual activities involving terrorist forces on the shores of Jamaica. He's also known by his codenumber "007".
- Maximilian Steel: Nicknamed "Quasimodo," the titular character and the primary antagonist of the story, who is a former mercenary turned believer in "a Heavenly faith," who also believes to be doing "God's work" by orchestrating an attack in the heart of Rockfeller Center.
- Nebula Valentine: A Jamaican secret service agent assisting Bond during his assignment, using her beauty and skillful strength to achieve her objectives, who later develops romantic feelings for Agent 007.
- Ernest Force: Nicknamed "Light Touch", who is Quasimodo's main accomplice and lifelong friend from a wartime. Both, in turn, work for the religious fanatic Reverend Hazelwood and his organization.
- Felix Leiter: Bond's CIA counterpart and ally who supplies him with information as well as acting as a secondary muscle when needed.
- Rev. Elias Hazelwood: An American pastor and a religious fanatic who formed "Disciples of The Heavenly Way", a faith-based committee which is merely a front for recruiting mercenaries and gunmen to fulfill his hidden agenda by attacking various places worldwide, making Quasimodo his right-hand man.
- Conan Lash: A ganja drugs dealer in Jamaica who calls himself "The King", helps Quasimodo smuggle his weapons disguised as ganja supplements from Jamaica to the United States through the Georgian swamps.
- Jonathan Rifle: An arms dealer who is tasked to sell a large amount of weapons and artillery to Revered Hazelwood's committee with a hidden agenda. He is simply referred to as "Rifle" in the career of his business.
- Gretchen Blair: A member of Hazelwood's committee who is planted in one of Rockfeller Center towers that the reverend schemes to demolish, providing her accomplices with all the access and blueprints to the building.

== See also ==
- James Bond (comics)
- Outline of James Bond
