= Metahuman =

Human with superpowers in DC Universe

Publication information
- Publisher: DC Comics
- First appearance: Invasion! #1 (December 1988)
- Created by: Shana

Characteristics
- Place of origin: Earth
- Inherent abilities: Varies by individual

In the DC Universe, a metahuman is a human or humanoid with superpowers. In American comic books published by DC Comics, the term is used loosely in most instances to refer to any individual, human-like or otherwise, with extraordinary, often paranormal abilities or other attributes, regardless of whether they are cosmic, mutant, scientific, supernatural, skill-based or technological in nature.

The term in comic books published by DC Comics is typically used as a loose government classification of superpowered people and not a descriptor of a character's specific origins. As such it is often applied readily to humanoid and human-looking characters such as Superman (an alien) and Wonder Woman (a near-goddess) just as it is to characters like Metamorpho (a mutated human) and Lilith Clay (a human born with psychic abilities).

Within the metahuman population is a segment of the human population born with a genetic variant called the "metagene". It is this variant that some human beings have to gain powers and other paranormal qualities during freak accidents, or to manifest powers during times of intense psychological distress, effectively making them a subspecies of superhumans living within the population. With the notable exception of its 1951 creation Captain Comet, DC has avoided using the term "mutant" to describe such characters, due to that term's association with the X-Men franchise published by Marvel Comics.

When adapting DC Comics stories for television, video games, and film, some adaptations have attempted to define metahuman more narrowly than the source material. In Birds of Prey and Young Justice, metahumans are treated as a distinct subspecies of humans (akin to mutants in Marvel's X-Men) while others such as the Arrowverse television franchise apply the term exclusively to humans who receive their powers in freak accidents. More recently, the DC Universe film and television franchise has applied the same loose definition as the original comics, applying the term to all manner of extraordinary individuals, especially those officially considered to have powers.

== Coinage ==
The term was first used as a reference to superheroes in 1986 by author George R. R. Martin, first in the Superworld role-playing system, and then later in his Wild Cards series of novels. It was introduced in DC Comics in 1994.

== DC Comics ==
The term "metahuman" was first used by the Dominators, an alien species who attacked Earth during the 1988 series Invasion! The Dominators use this term to refer to any human native of the planet Earth with "fictional superhuman abilities". The prefix "meta-" simply means "beyond", denoting powers and abilities beyond human limits.

=== The metagene ===
The Invasion! miniseries (1988) provided a concept for why humans in the DC Universe would survive catastrophic events and develop superpowers. One of the Dominators discovered that select members of the human race had a "biological variant," which he called the metagene (also spelled "meta-gene"). This gene often lay dormant until an instant of extraordinary physical and emotional stress activates it. A "spontaneous chromosomal combustion" then takes place, as the metagene takes the source of the biostress – be it chemical, radioactive or other similar phenomenon – and turns the potential catastrophe into a catalyst for "genetic change," resulting in metahuman abilities. It is also possible for the metagene to be active from birth, suggesting that it can activate spontaneously and without any prior appearance in the ancestry.

It is possible for individuals skilled in science and biology to manipulate, dampen or modify the activities of the metagene. During Final Crisis, while the Dominators devised a Gene Bomb able to accelerate the metagene activity to the point of cellular and physical instability, an anti-metagene virus was spread as a last-ditch weapon in the invaded Checkmate quarters. This metavirus has the opposite effects of the Gene Bomb, shutting down the metagene and stripping metahumans of their powers for an unspecified amount of time.

==== Origins ====
DC Comics presents two conflicting accounts of the origins of the metagene. The 1995 Xenobrood mini-series shows the alien Vimanian race claim credit for the introduction of superpowered alien genetic matter into human DNA. The Vimanians forced their superpowered worker drones to mate with humanity's ancestors Australopithecus afarensis and Homo erectus to create a race of superpowered slaves.

Later, in Road to Dark Nights: Metal (2017), the Joker revealed to Duke Thomas that the term "meta" originated from a rudimentary hospital program used to automatically flag Nth Metal toxicity found in a person's bloodstream, similar to iron or zinc, with "meta" being short for "metal". This natural toxicity is the "variant" hat changes the individual's DNA, resulting in the metagene and its various heightened abilities and powers.

=== Metahuman as classification ===
The terms "meta" and "metahuman" do not refer only to humans born with biological variants. It can refer to anyone with intrinsic extraordinary powers, no matter the origins, and including those not born with such power. Superman and Martian Manhunter (aliens) as well as Wonder Woman (a near-goddess) and Aquaman (an Atlantean) are referred to in many instances as metahumans. According to Countdown to Infinite Crisis, roughly 1.3 million metahumans live on Earth, 99.5% of whom are considered "nuisance-level". The other 0.5% are what Checkmate considers alpha-, beta- and gamma-level threats. For example, Superman and Wonder Woman are categorized as alpha-level, while Metamorpho is considered a beta-level and Ratcatcher is considered gamma-level.

In 2026, the DC Comics website stated that metahuman was a label rather than a stable taxonomic category: "If you're looking for consistent parameters on what does or doesn't count as a metahuman, you're not gonna find them." Within the comics, the editorial stated that whether being a metahuman was defined by "the scope of the powers or their nature... depends who you ask". Specifically in relation to the films and TV series, it said "The line seems to be drawn at intrinsic powers versus extrinsic powers. If your powers come from an accessory you can take on and off, you're not a metahuman. But if you have a cybernetic implant, that does classify you as a metahuman."

=== Exo-gene ===
The 52 miniseries introduced a toxic mutagen called the Exo-gene (also referred to as the Exogene). It is a toxic gene therapy treatment created by LexCorp for the Everyman Project, which creates metahuman abilities in compatible non-metahumans. The project was controversial, creating unstable heroes that gave Luthor an "off switch" for their powers, creating countless mid-flight deaths.

== Marvel Comics ==
The word "metahuman" is often attributed to the DC Universe, while superhuman beings in the Marvel Universe are referred to as either mutants or mutates. However, both DC and Marvel Comics have made use of the term "metahuman" and "mutant" in their universes. The first use of the term 'metahuman' in the Marvel Universe occurred in New Mutants Annual #3 (1987), in which a Russian security officer describes the protagonists as "metahuman terrorists".

== In other media ==
- In Birds of Prey, metahumans included heroines the Huntress and Dinah Lance. They are treated seemingly as a race or species separate from humans.
- In Smallville, metahumans can occur naturally. However, the majority are the result of exposure to kryptonite, which can give humans superpowers.
- In Young Justice, all metahumans are descended from Vandal Savage. In the third season, humans learn to detect and activate the metagene, resulting in widespread human trafficking.
- In the Arrowverse franchise, "metahuman" is used more narrowly than in the comics, typically referring to a human being who becomes transhuman and has uncanny abilities, often acquired by accident.
- In the continuity of the DC Universe, metahumans existed for 300 years prior to the events of Superman. The series Peacemaker and Creature Commandos establish that the term is used loosely; as in the comics, it is inclusive of cyborgs like Sasha Bordeaux as well as mystics, mutated humans, revenants, aliens, and the otherwise enhanced.

== See also ==
- List of metahumans in DC Comics
- Homo mermanus
- Mutants and mutates, the Marvel Universe equivalents of metahumans
- Superhuman
- Superpower (ability)
- Transhumanism
