= James Bond 007: Serpent's Tooth =

- James Bond 007: Serpent's Tooth #1 (1992) cover art by Paul Gulacy and Egon Selby

Publication information
- Publisher: Dark Horse Comics
- Genre: Spy; Action/Adventure; Science fiction
- Publication date: July 1992 – February 1993
- No. of issues: 3
- Main character(s): James Bond

Creative team
- Written by: Doug Moench
- Artist(s): Paul Gulacy
- Colorist(s): Steve Oliff
- Editor(s): Jerry Prosser

Collected editions
- Serpent's Tooth Paperback: ISBN 1878574787

James Bond 007: Serpent's Tooth is a 1992 spy comic book limited series, packaged by Acme Comics and published by Dark Horse Comics, featuring Ian Fleming's secret agent, James Bond in the lead. Consisting of three issues, it is written by Doug Moench and illustrated by Paul Gulacy. It is also the first comic book in a series of Bond adventures in the run of the publisher.

== Plot ==
=== Part I: Introduction ===
Several years ago, unusual incidents have taken place to the matters of national security when a woman mysteriously went missing in Peru, several scientists went abducted, and the occurrence of manslaughter on a British soil in the Arctic, with a whole ice station of naval maintenance were assassinated, as well as their submarine sabotaged by an unknown group of mercenaries, whose primary plan was to steal all the six nuclear missiles within, which they succeed in.

In present day, while on holiday in Switzerland, James Bond is contacted by M for an urgent assignment to take right after disabling the widow of a downed KGB assassin. Upon his arrival in London, Bond learns that the British Secret Service has lost an operative, Agent 009 in Peru who was investigating the notable submarine incident a few years back. Bond is immediately sent to Peru to meet his contact, Enrique Cruzado, who sends one of his own operatives, Sunny Vasquez, to collect him from the airport. During the driveway to Cruzado's compound, Bond and Sunny are chased by an unknown assailant who unsuccessfully try to eliminate them, mainly aiming for Sunny herself since she and her superior, Cruzado were also the local contacts for 009 when he was on the case.

After they are safely delivered to the compound, Bond is informed by Cruzado that 009 was investigating a corporation called Paradiso Industries, which he suspected it was a front for a biomedical research specializing in genetics, headed by a North American mogul named Indigo. Posing as a Scottish biogeneticist, Derek Pentecost, Bond confronts Indigo at a casino off the shores of Lima he runs and beats him at a game of baccarat, only to capture the mogul's interest who insists to get to know the man who cleaned him out better. Bond, as the supposedly Dr. Pentecost, convinces Indigo to hire him, unveiling he is 'stationed in the same field work', which the latter accepts and arranges a meeting for him the next day.

The following night during an intimate conversation, Sunny briefs Bond about Indigo's background, stating that he carries a rare blood disorder which mimics coldbloodedness, requiring thermal control of a hermetic environment, all caused by a failed experiment. According to theories, the experiment itself merged reptilian chromosomes into his blood, leading him to believe that he is The Great Serpent.

In the next morning, Bond travels to Paradiso Industries to the meeting he's been drawn to and encounters strange-looking twins in white shape, Kane and Abel, who escort him into a trap room, unbeknownst to 007, for a brainwash. As the operation commenced, a loud voice lent by Indigo himself attempted to convert Bond's mind into full obedient subhuman, which he survives, tricking his way out, he escapes, heading to the vault to steal a few envelopes and documents concerning the secrets of the corporation, along with a blood sample in his pocket. After bursting through several corridors and dodging bullets in a firefight, Bond escapes the building and is driven away by Sunny who arrives right on time.

In the aftermath of the incident, Indigo decides to pack up and move out of the place before his sinister operation is fully exposed. Going through his experimental materials he caged in a hidden sector, it was revealed he has resurrected an animalistic race that became extinct: A dinosaur.

=== Part II: Blood in Eden ===
Back in the compound, Bond, Cruzado and Sunny analyze the documents the former stole from Indigo's vaults, which appear to be charts and close up maps on the Ancash Region with circulated targets stamped on selected villages, where several kidnappings of girl children have taken place at, which the villagers claim it was the works of local superstitious figures called Hupias, faceless ghostly vampires of sorts, and Chupas, a strange light in the night sky. Cruzado mockingly dismisses the belief as the locals' version of UFO. 007, without wasting a moment, opts to investigate the entire region, after Major Boothroyd equips him with a few gadgets and a weapon-laden speedboat to ride on the Santa River.

Before departing to surveillance, Bond is contacted by M who tells him that the blood sample he acquired from Paradiso Industries is to that of the vials of 009 himself, injected with unusual chromosomes, much to the shock of everyone. Already highlighted as a threat, Indigo's corporation is demanded to be shut down in immediate action. Meanwhile, back in a hidden lair, Indigo puts his plans into test, only to reveal that he is planning to flood the earth by causing massive sea-quakes, terminate the entire human race and form a new world thereafter, becoming its ruler.

Bond and Sunny head to the Ancash Region to keep an eye out for potential kidnappings. In the middle of the night, a flying saucer, very much in resemblance of an extraterrestrial's UFO, emerges from nowhere. Another local girl, who believes she is chased by a "Chupa" is abducted, and surprisingly enough, Sunny is gone, as well. 007 attempts to fight the saucer by opening fire at it, and is shot at in return, merely making an escape in his speedboat, unsuccessful to apprehend the assailant.

The next few hours has Bond remaining awake with the company of his cigarettes, waiting for the flying saucer to appear, again. On guard, his expectation is fulfilled when he spots one and gives it a chase over the river with the speedboat, only to be confronted by rival gunmen on their own vehicle of the same sorts. After eliminating everyone in sight, using all the weapons attached to the machinery, as well as destroying a saucer in the process, Bond's speedboat is hovered down the waterfalls and destroyed. But, he was able to leap over in time and land to safety with the aid of a parachute. Through the radio transmitter he carried, he contacts Cruzado to prepare his commandos for an assault mission.

The quest afoot, thriving into the jungles, Bond finds a secret entrance to Indigo's lair which is hidden behind the ruins of an Inca temple. Exploring the path inside to the lair, 007 infiltrates "an isle" which is custom made by the hands of man, which Indigo has named "Eden". The center of Eden was a remote island, ordered by Indigo to submerge, covered with solid treads around to protect the diving land against the push of the water's thick waves. In the meantime, Bond comes across animals who were supposed to have gone extinct with the death of the stone age, only to be surprised by an abrupt attacking dinosaur, which, after exhausting efforts, he defeated.

Sneaking deeper inside, Bond discovers that many of the Quinto girls kidnapped years ago from the Ancash villages are located there, and one of them he recognizes as Laya Rio, whom he briefly met as Indigo's travelling companion back at the casino. They are protected inside an electric fence, orchestrating a plan to breach it.

=== Part III: Mass Extinction ===
Indigo sends Kane to cross the outer yard of the fence to tranquilize the dinosaur, assuming it killed the intruder, and cage the animal to neutralize the threat to the other rare creations of The Great Serpent. Bond surprises Kane in an instant drop on a speeding topless jeep, and kills the henchman in a struggling fistfight, taking advantage from the circumstances that allowed the fence to have its gates open and delve deep into it. He tracks down and approaches Laya, informing him of Indigo's motivations, but the latter finds it hard to believe that Indigo is an arachist and believes he has created her and all the other girls he kidnapped, willing to disrupt the world from evil. Bond convinces her that she has been tricked and none of the stories are true and that Indigo seeks nothing but world domination for himself.

Convinced, Laya, by Bond's demand, takes him to the central heart of the computers that control the entire isle of Eden, only to be surprised by Indigo who shows up with armed troops and Kane's twin brother or clone to presume, Abel. Indigo orders the capture of them both but slits the throat of the girl, calling her "ungrateful child," leaving Bond heavily disturbed by the motion. Furthermore, he demonstrates his entire plan of a new world order, seeing himself as a god, flooding the Earth in its entirely, starting with the two American continents. The stolen nuclear missiles years ago were specifically reserved to fire at strategically sensitive places in the world to cause quakes. He orders Abel to lock up Bond and strips him entirely from his weapons.

Managing to provide distraction on the right time, while on a bridge with a large water tank underneath, Bond engages in a hand-to-hand combat with Abel, wrestling, with both ultimately falling down to the water. In result, Abel is captured by a giant octopus as a prey and killed, while Bond makes his way out of the pool, only to be captured by gunmen, again and properly escorted to prison. He is, however, surprised to find out that Sunny is still alive and had broken free, taking out the guards once she was out of the cells. Encouraged, Bond teams up with Sunny to go after Indigo and stop the countdown of the missiles launch, killing as many troops as they can see in the process, while from outside, due to a signal Bond's wristwatch has sent, Cruzado's commandos attack the gunships that escorted Eden from above, taking over the forces for themselves against the isle.

Indigo makes an escape to the main control room, calling in an experiment he transformed from a human body to a giant beast that resembled a neanderthal to kill Bond and Sunny, much to Bond's shock, who identifies the experimented creature as 009. The latter hesitates to take the shot once he also recognizes Bond as a friend and an ally, only to be stabbed in the back by Indigo for being "disobedient". Enraged, 007 races after him, and both of them are caught in an intensive fistfight, while Sunny tries to stop the countdown. At last but not the least, Bond manages to drain the life out of Indigo by sending him across the skull of a dinosaur, whose sharp teeth penetrate the victim's body and kill him for good. Bond ironically calls the scenery "Serpent's Tooth".

With the gunships destroying, sinking down into the water, they all head the treads and cause a flood through a broken glass into Eden that is underneath. Bond and Sunny head to the launch-tubes to escape the place before it is too late, freeing all the abducted Quinto girls and scientists on the way. While Sunny keeps her presence around them, Bond finds a scuba gear and dives into the spreading water to open the tube hatches as well as take control of Indigo's personal escape pod, a small submarine. Before he could reach it, he fights the giant squid from earlier and by the skin of his teeth, defeats the creature. On the last leg of the moment, Bond delivers the submarine in time for the rescue of Sunny and the others, as they manage to evacuate the pod in time.

They were expected out there by a victorious Cruzado and his men, helping up all the girls and the scientists. Leaving Cruzado confused, Bond kidnaps the submarine for himself with Sunny as his companion to enjoy a rather romantic moment they share.

== Characters ==
- James Bond: Agent 007 of the British Secret Service, the main protagonist of the story, who is sent to investigate the disappearance of several scientists as well as the missing nuclear missiles, replacing Agent 009, who himself has gone out of the radar in Peru.
- Sunny Vasquez: A Peruvian secret agent, who is as beautiful as she is deadly, aiding Bond in his mission while on the trail of exploring the hidden agenda behind Paradiso Industries. She is one of the main operatives of elite force unit commander, Senor Enrique Cruzado, who trusts in her capabilities deeply.
- Indigo: The main antagonist of the story, a mysterious man with abnormal chromosomes injected into his blood vial due to a failed experiment. He is said to be a North American, who heads Paradiso Industries, a front for a biomedical research specializing in genetics. Indigo sees himself as The Great Serpent and a god who's willing to create a new world with him as the leader.
- Enrique Cruzado: A commander of a very elite force unit, who trains commandos under very heavy pressure and is placed as an intelligence officer among the Peruvian government on unofficial charts. He was helping 009 investigate Paradiso Industries until the latter went missing and was replaced by 007, whom he provides manpower at the end to unleash a raid onto Indigo's lair.
- Kane and "Abel": Indigo's henchmen who sport a very pale white skin, believed to be either twin brothers or clones of one another. Practically, the primary 'man' is addressed to as Kane, while the second one has no official name until Bond jokingly provides him with one, which is 'Abel'. A play on Cain and Abel by Biblical sense.
- Laya Rio: One of the kidnapped Quinto girls from the Ancash Region who was brainwashed into believing that she is Indigo's creation. She was first seen accompanying "her creator" at his own casino, playing baccarat opposite Bond, whom the latter refers to as Indigo's "lady luck".
- Martika Payna: The widow of a deceased KGB officer, Sergei Payna, who poses as Kristina, a female companion to Bond while on holiday in Switzerland. After revealing herself to 007, they clash, with Bond himself gaining the upper hand, knocking her down unconscious.
- M: The head of the British Secret Service and Bond's superior who assigns him to replace 009 at once.
- Miss Moneypenny: M's personal secretary who doesn't miss the chance to appear flirtatious with Bond.
- Major Boothroyd: The 'Quartermaster' and head of "Q-Division", who arrives in Peru when 007 was in the middle of progression and provides him with handful amount of gadgets and a weapon-laden speedboat. He urges Bond to bring them all back in one piece.
- Agent 009: A fellow 00-agent of Bond's, who has been assigned years prior to Bond's involvement in the case to investigate the disappearance of the Royal Navy submarine and its nuclear missiles, whose last sign came from the Paradiso Industries headquarters. He is experimented upon by Indigo and his scientists to turn into a beast due to the transformation of his blood chromosomes into a neanderthal.

== See also ==
- James Bond (comics)
- Outline of James Bond
