= Skizz =

Comic book strip

- The 2005 trade paperback edition

Publication information
- Publisher: 2000 AD
- Publication date: 1983–1995
- Main character: Skizz

Creative team
- Written by: Alan Moore
- Artist: Jim Baikie

Skizz was a comic strip in 2000 AD which appeared in three installments across more than a decade. The initial run was written by Alan Moore and drawn by Jim Baikie. Two sequels appeared some years later, written and drawn by Baikie.

== Plot ==
Skizz, an alien interpreter, crash lands on Earth and his ship self-destructs to stop it from falling into the wrong hands. He is saved from the military (led by a thuggish South African named Van Owen - an apparent reference to Warren Zevon's "Roland the Headless Thompson Gunner") by a young girl called Roxy.

== Bibliography ==
- Skizz:
  - Skizz (in 2000 AD #308–330, 1983)
  - Alien Cultures (in 2000 AD #767–775, 1992)
  - Skizz Book 3 (in 2000 AD #912–927, 1994–1995)

There have a number of trade paperback releases over the years:

- Skizz:
  - Titan (1989 ISBN 1-85286-135-5)
  - Titan (2002 ISBN 1-84023-450-4)
  - Rebellion Developments (2005 ISBN 1-904265-30-8)
  - DC (2005 ISBN 1-4012-0579-8)
- Skizz II: Alien Cultures:
  - Mandarin (1993 ISBN 0-7493-1638-1 )
