= Powerman (comics) =

- The cover to Powerman #30, art by Brian Bolland.

Publication information
- Publisher: Pikin Press (aka Pican Publications)
- First appearance: Powerman #1 (1975)
- Created by: (writers) Don Avenall and Norman Worker (artists) Dave Gibbons and Brian Bolland

In-story information
- Species: Human
- Place of origin: Nigeria, Earth
- Abilities: Superhuman strength; Flight
Powerman
Publication information
- Schedule: Biweekly
- Format: Ongoing series
- Genre: Superhero
- Publication date: 1975 – 1977
- Main character: Powerman (aka Powerbolt)
Creative team
- Written by: Don Avenall and Norman Worker
- Artist(s): Dave Gibbons and Brian Bolland

Powerman is a British comic book series that was initially distributed in Nigeria in the mid-1970s. Powerman was written by Don Avenall (aka Donne Avenell) and Norman Worker, and illustrated by Dave Gibbons and Brian Bolland. Rendered in a simple style reminiscent of the Golden Age Captain Marvel, the series starred a superhero named Powerman. When the comics were re-published in the United Kingdom the character's name became Powerbolt.

The Powerman comics also feature a backup series called Jango, about a black sheriff.

== Publication history ==
Historically, comics in Nigeria were imported and had white protagonists. An executive from Pikin, a Nigerian advertising agency, approached English art agency Bardon Press Features to discuss the idea of creating a series with a black superhero, that would be used to promote literacy in Nigeria.

Aspiring comic book artists Dave Gibbons and Brian Bolland were connected to Bardon Press Features and were tapped for the job. When Gibbons asked why African creators did not work on the strips, he was told that African artists would likely emerge once comics become popular in Africa. With comics purportedly being new to Nigeria, Bolland recalls this work being created specifically to be "really simple; six panels on a page and [all] the panels had to be numbered". Gibbons also recalls there was difficulty adjusting to writing for a Nigerian culture; for instance, he was told that a fat stomach indicated "success and power" instead of "gluttony or greed" and that having Powerman "always get off with the girls" was not considered sexist.

Gibbons designed the character and the series logo. Gibbons and Bolland were to draw alternate issues, though they worked closely together. Together, they produced one 14-page issue per month, which was published every fortnight. Bolland's first issue was Powerman #2, and he recalls that "soon Dave had drawn his entire story and I had produced just a few pages". This knowledge — "that Dave could produce a page a day... and that I was going to have to do the same" — was a shock, but proved to be "the very best kind of training ground". Ultimately, Bolland "drew around 300 pages of that very straightforward, simple-to-follow work, and I guess the storytelling flowed naturally from that". Even so, he "was always struggling to get the last eight or ten pages finished" and was occasionally helped by friends, including Gibbons and future-2000 AD and League of Extraordinary Gentlemen artist Kevin O'Neill.

By 1977 Powerman dropped to a monthly schedule. In 1988, the British publisher Acme Press reprinted the series to capitalize on the popularity of the artists, both of whose careers had since taken off. Power Comics was a four-issue bimonthly limited series of 32 pages each, and was overseen by Bambos Georgiou. Powerman's name was changed to "Powerbolt" to avoid confusion with the character Luke Cage (also called "Power Man"), published by Marvel Comics. As part of Acme's deal with Eclipse Comics, Power Comics was distributed in the U.S. by the Californian publisher.

== Fictional character history ==
Powerman protects Nigeria from dinosaurs, robots, and other threats. One white character, a dishonest blond property developer, is named Boss Blitzer. Blitzer faces defeat at the hands of Powerman.

== Powers and abilities ==
Powerman has superhuman strength and can fly. His only apparent weakness is snakebite.

== See also ==
- African characters in comics
