= James Bond 007: Minute of Midnight =

Dark Horse Comics #25
- Dark Horse Comics #25 (1994) featuring James Bond 007: Minute of Midnight cover art by Russ Heath.

Publication information
- Publisher: Dark Horse Comics
- Genre: Spy; Action/Adventure
- Publication date: September 1994
- No. of issues: 1
- Main character(s): James Bond

Creative team
- Written by: Doug Moench
- Artist(s): Russ Heath
- Letterer(s): Clem Robins
- Colorist(s): Raymond P. Murtaugh
- Editor(s): Randy Stradley; Edward Martin III

James Bond 007: Minute of Midnight is a 1994 spy thriller comic book featuring Ian Fleming's secret agent, James Bond in the lead, with the story written by Doug Moench and illustrated by Russ Heath, and published by Dark Horse Comics. It is released as part of a double bill alongside an unrelated franchise title Aliens Vs. Predator: Blood Time issued in Dark Horse Comics #25.

== Plot ==
James Bond is sent to Washington DC to spy on a meeting held by a terrorist organization led by a man called Lexis, who plans to hold the world ransom by threatening the globe with sabotaging nuclear power plants, an operation he codenamed "Miasma". After eavesdropping the conversation, Bond delivers the recorded tape to a man called Sykes who works for the CIA, having asked for Agent 007 especially from the British Intelligence due to the man they are after, Lexis, being a British citizen. Sykes also asks Bond to deliver the document and the tape personally back to London in a briefcase, which the former claims to be more secure than transporting it through cryptography.

The next day at an airport in Maryland, Bond meets with a contact named Robert Nagell, who will be his CIA escort from the US soil all the way to Britain. Once they are on board as the plane takes off heading to Lakenheath Airfield, Nagell surprises Bond with a gas leaking grenade and distracts the whole airplane out of its normal measures, revealing himself as a double agent who is after the briefcase Bond is handcuffed to. They struggle in a fistfight while the plane is going out of control in the air. Nagell realizes he failed for the time being when 007 proves to have gained the upper hand; he steals a parachute and leaps out of the aircraft. Bond jumps after Nagell and the struggle ensues once more. He strips the assailant of his parachute and allows him fall to his death. As the plane was still out of control, Bond manages to land the parachute on top of the flying vehicle, entering and clearing the gas from the cockpit. Thereby, taking control of the aircraft, and following the routine as planned.

Upon his arrival at Lakenheath Airfield, Bond is made to rendezvous with Nigel Redditch, who is introduced as a desk hound working for Bill Tanner, the Chief of Staff in the British Intelligence. Redditch takes the briefcase as ordered and delivers a message to 007 from "M" to assassinate Lexis since the CIA was unable to take care of it and given that the target was already in England. At night, Bond locates Lexis at his own estate outside London, and assassinates him from afar with a sniper rifle. Even though, he convinced himself to act like a professional, the scream of Lexis' daughter and her tears over her father's corpse haunts him as he watches her through the scope.

Tanner is now in charge of the British Intelligence since "M" was away due to his diplomatic status. He is attending a summit conference in France, from where he personally sends a message to 007 through Tanner, giving him a week off. Bond, still disturbed by the image he created the night earlier, accepts the vacation and departs. Meanwhile, it is revealed that Sykes and Redditch are part of Lexis' organization as they substitute the real briefcase with a false one on its delivery as well as scheme the abduction of "M".

== See also ==
- James Bond (comics)
- Outline of James Bond
