= Six from Sirius =

- Cover of the 1st issue.

Publication information
- Publisher: Marvel Comics
- Schedule: Monthly
- Format: Miniseries
- Genre: Science fiction
- Publication date: July 1984 – October 1984; December 1985 – March 1986
- No. of issues: 4; 4

Creative team
- Written by: Doug Moench
- Artist(s): Paul Gulacy
- Letterer(s): Six from Sirius; Gaspar Saladino; Six from Sirius II; Jim Novack
- Colorist(s): Paul Gulacy
- Editor(s): Archie Goodwin

Collected editions
- Hardcover: ISBN 1-933305-04-5
- Softcover: ISBN 1933305037

Six from Sirius is an American comic book miniseries created by Doug Moench and Paul Gulacy and published by Marvel Comics through its Epic Comics imprint in 1984. It was followed by a sequel series in 1985 titled Six from Sirius II.

The plot focuses on six intergalactic agents working for a governmental organization.

== Collected editions ==
The series has been collected into a single volume by Dynamite Entertainment:

- Six from Sirius (128 pages, hardcover, July 2005, ISBN 1-933305-04-5, softcover, November 2005, ISBN 1-933305-03-7)
