= Electric Warrior (comics) =

- Cover to issue #1, art by Jim Baikie.

Publication information
- Publisher: DC Comics
- Schedule: Monthly
- Format: Limited series
- Publication date: May 1986 – October 1987
- No. of issues: 18

Creative team
- Written by: Doug Moench
- Artist(s): Jim Baikie
- Inker(s): Jim Baikie, Pablo Marcos, Dennis Janke
- Colorist(s): Tom Ziuko

Electric Warrior is an American comic book series, published by DC Comics in 1986 and 1987. Set outside the continuity of the DC Universe, the series was written by Doug Moench with artwork provided by Jim Baikie. A total of eighteen issues were published.

== Creation ==
In an Interview Moench spoke on the genesis of the character stating,

"Derek Two-Shadow is an extension of myself and my own beliefs. When I was a kid playing cowboys and Indians, I always insisted on being the Indian. They were so much cooler with their long hair in contrast to the cowboys short hair, their bows instead of six-shooters, their feathers and moccasins instead of boots, and their fringe on leggings instead of blue jeans—although I loved the latter. So Derek and all the people living in the Wilderness definitely represented the Native Americans for me."”

Moench in the same interview spoke on the character's design

"The robot warrior's design for the metal hat is meant to look like a headdress. The warrior part of the image came from the Native-American thing, while the electric part came from the future thing.”

== Summary ==
The series in set in a future where the rich (Elites) live in luxury, their lifestyles supported by an array of cybernetic devices and robots, while the poor (Zigs) are forced to struggle for their existence in the lower levels of the city. When one of the robot policemen, known as the Electric Warriors, or Leks, develops self-awareness, it begins to question the correctness of the social order and decides to help the Zigs. This robot is called 9-03, and it falls in love with a Zig crone called Kinsolving, whom he protects from any and all harm. He then helps the Zigs by giving them food and supplies taken from the Elites up above.

At the same time, a man named Derek Two-Shadow is living in the forest with a tribe of natural born natives called Primmies. They have rejected all forms of modern technology. A female scholar, Quintana, is sent into the forest to live with the Primmies and study them. She gets to know Derek Two-Shadow, and learns of his history and life. He was born as a Zig, but escaped to the wilderness when he was still a child. One night, a group of genetic mutants (Genidiots) sneaks into the Primmie camp to steal food. Quintana is startled to see one, and she shoots and kills three of them with her laser pistol. She did not know that the Genidiots were allowed to steal food in exchange for peace between the two factions. With the killing of the three intruders, the peace is broken and the Genidiots will attack. She offers her weapons to defend the village, but since this goes against the Primmie principle of rejecting technology, she is told to leave and never come back.

When the Leks sent to capture 9-03 learn of Kinsolving's close relationship with 9-03, they decide to kidnap her and take her to headquarters for further questioning. 9-03 storms into the Elite leader's office and demands he release Kinsolving. The leader's name is Magistrate Marder. He agrees to free Kinsolving in exchange for letting his techs examine 9-03 and figure out how he became sentient. 9-03 manages to free Kinsolving, but when a group of gunships sent to pursue them fires a warning shot, 9-03 sees that the shot is going to kill a Zig family. He throws himself in front of the shot and saves the Zigs, but he is blown to pieces.

Magistrate Marder has learned about a fleet of what appear to be alien vessels and wishes to fuse man and machine to create a new breed of Electric Warrior, the Synthoids. He had hoped to duplicate 9-03's autonomy and intelligence, but since that failed, he has the Primmies rounded up, captured, then taken to the city where they are converted into cyborgs and most of them die from the shock. Two-Shadow, however, is one of the lucky ones: the components of 9-03 are fused to his body after most of it has been amputated. Upon awakening after his surgery, Derek feels the essence of 9-03 within his altered body, escapes, and finds a component of the robot at Kinsolving's home that he uses to flood his body with nanites and merge 9-03's mind with his own; although they retain their independent brain patterns, they can never again be separated.

The Electric Warrior forces an alliance between the Primmies, Zigs, Genidiots, and Elites to fight the invasion, but when the "aliens" come, they are revealed to be very human – the Electric Warrior's planet had been an experiment set up to determine how civilizations develop. Derek Two-Shadow was actually a resident of Earth who had signed up for the experiment after discovering that his wife had had herself rendered cybernetically immortal. This disgusted him into leaving her forever due to the fact that the surgery required had left horrible scars on her back and her body had been changed so that they could no longer enjoy a normal physical relationship. The Electric Warrior agrees to go back to Earth with the "aliens" to give them their experimental data, while the rest of the people remain behind but in a more mutually beneficial and cooperative peace.
