= Blackmask (comic book) =

- Cover to Blackmask #1.

Publication information
- Publisher: DC Comics
- Schedule: Monthly
- Format: Mini-series
- Publication date: 1993
- No. of issues: 3

Creative team
- Created by: Brian Augustyn; Jim Baikie
- Written by: Brian Augustyn
- Artist(s): Jim Baikie
- Letterer(s): Albert De Guzman
- Colorist(s): Jim Baikie
- Editor(s): Archie Goodwin; Bill Kaplan

Blackmask is a three-issue prestige format mini-series by Brian Augustyn and Jim Baikie published in 1993 by DC Comics.

== Plot ==
Set during the aftermath of the Korean War, the appearance of a masked vigilante known as Blackmask (Daniel "Dan" Cady) in a small American town causes concern for both the police and the Mafia.
