= Valentine (comics) =

British weekly girls' romance comic

- The cover to Valentine, dated 24 August 1963.

Publication information
- Publisher: Amalgamated Press; 1955 to 1959; Fleetway Publications; 1959 to 1969; IPC Magazines; 1969 to 1974
- Schedule: Weekly
- Format: Ongoing series
- Genre: Romance
- Publication date: 19 January 1957 – 9 November 1974
- No. of issues: 922

Creative team
- Written by: Jenny Butterworth
- Artist(s): Shirley Bellwood; Gerry Haylock; Mike Hubbard
- Editor(s): Mike Butterworth

Valentine was a British girls romance comic published weekly by Amalgamated Press, Fleetway Publications and IPC Magazines between 19 January 1957 and 9 November 1974. It ran for 922 issues before merging with Mirabelle.

== Creation ==
The success of Marilyn encouraged Amalgamated Press to produce more romance comics. As editor Peter Lewis and his team were busy on Marilyn, Love Story Library and True Life, experienced boys' adventure writer Mike Butterworth was assigned as editor of the new Valentine. He recruited his wife Jenny as unofficial sub-editor and primary writer for the title. Like the company's other weekly romance comics it was black and white with a third colour on the cover - blue, in Valentine's case. The first issue came with Cyril Stapleton's All-Star Songbook as a free gift.

The pair struck on the hook of basing the stories around contemporary hits by the likes of Malcolm Vaughan, Conway Twitty, Jerry Lee Lewis and Perry Como. Illustrators included Shirley Bellwood and Gerry Haylock, as well as a host of European artists like Carlos Prunez Alvarez and Roberto Casarrubio. Later the list of contributors to Valentine would grow to include such notables as Guido Buzzelli, Víctor de la Fuente, Jesús Blasco, Félix Mas, José Ortiz, José Beá, Ramon Torrents, Jesus Redondo, Carlos Ezquerra and Enrique Badía Romero.

== Publishing history ==
Valentine quickly became a runaway success, and by 1961 was selling 400,000 copies before circulation rose to half a million. The comic stayed fresh as the sixties went on by following the pop charts closely with strips inspired by songs recorded by The McGuire Sisters, Johnnie Ray, Adam Faith, Connie Francis, The Shadows, Eden Kane, Billy Fury, Pat Boone, Brenda Lee, Gerry and the Pacemakers, Cilla Black, The Overlanders, Four Tops, The Beatles, The Easybeats, The Move and many more.

The comic's status as the flagship romance comic Amalgamated Press and - as of the company's 1959 purchase by the Mirror Group - Fleetway Publications was shown as it began absorbing underperforming titles from the group. Having already incorporated T.V. Fan in 1960 it subsumed the short-lived Serenade in February 1963, Roxy six months later and then line grandee Marilyn in 1965.

However, as the sixties ended fashion magazines began to firmly take over from romance comics, while Fleetway was reorganised into IPC Magazines in 1969. Valentine was refreshed by use of the relatively new web offset printing method, with the front and back pages promoted to full colour, and inside an increasing number of pages were switched to fashion features over picture strips. Valentine lasted until November 1974, when it was folded into the magazine-comic hybrid Mirabelle.

In 2018, Rebellion Developments purchased the rights to the pre-1970 Amalgamated Press/Fleetway/IPC comic titles, including Valentine. 2000 AD artist and comics historian David Roach curated an anthology of romance comics for Rebellion's Treasury of British Comics label called A Very British Affair - The Best of Classic Romance Comics in 2023; an avowed fan of British romance comics in general and Valentine in particular, he included 30 strips from the comic in the collection. The collection received positive reviews.
