= Roxy (comics) =

British weekly girls' romance comic

- The cover to Roxy, dated 7 March 1959.

Publication information
- Publisher: Amalgamated Press; 1958 to 1959; Fleetway Publications; 1959 to 1963
- Schedule: Weekly
- Format: Ongoing series
- Genre: Romance
- Publication date: 15 March 1958 – 14 September 1963
- No. of issues: 288
- Editor(s): Robert Lewis

Roxy was a British girls romance comic published weekly by Amalgamated Press and Fleetway Publications between 15 March 1958 and 14 September 1963. It ran for 288 issues before merging with Valentine.

== Creation ==
Amalgamated Press had launched Marilyn in 1957 as the first weekly British comic aimed at teenage girls and women, and was an instant success. Within a year its creator Robert Lewis was tasked with starting up a sister title. Roxy was similar in content to Marilyn, being a 24-page black-and-white comic (with green ink incorporated into the cover in contrast with the red of Marilyn), featuring a mix of serialised and stand alone picture strip and text romance stories. Both titles carried advertising for each other, with Roxy coming out on Mondays and Marilyn on Thursdays.

== Publishing history ==
An initial hook of Roxy was a lead story purporting to be 'told' by a celebrity. The first issue featured Tommy Steele, tying into the issue's launch free gift of a 'Tommy Steel Lucky Guitar' pin-badge. Later 'storytellers' included the likes of jazz musician Joe Henderson, skiffle star Johnny Duncan, trad singer Tony Brent and variety show host Jackie Rae. These stories typically involved a fictional female from the comic's demographic experiencing the kindness of their idol during a brief and chaste encounter. Features typically revolved around pop music; Lonnie Donegan and Dickie Valentine both lent their likenesses to columns. These were later updated, with the likes of Anthony Newley, Billy Fury, Helen Shapiro and The Shadows. Meanwhile, Clancy J. Smith ran Clancy's Cats Club from column "Clancy's Clarion" and Earl Leaf kept readers up to date with the latest happenings in America in "Transatlantic Talk". Roxy even sponsored an annual 'pop prom' concert from 1958; the 1960 edition featured Cliff Richard, Adam Faith and Emile Ford and the Checkmates.

Following the purchase of Amalgamated Press by the Mirror Group and its reconfiguration into Fleetway, the title was one of several to benefit from the use of Spanish and Italian art studios. However, Fleetway also now included the romance titles previously published by rival Pearson. A combination of the influx of titles, increased competition from rival DC Thomson's own romance comics Romeo and Jackie as well as the view that Roxy was falling out of fashion saw the comic absorbed into Valentine from 21 September 1964.

In 2018, Rebellion Developments purchased the rights to the pre-1970 Amalgamated Press/Fleetway/IPC comic titles, including Roxy. 2000 AD artist and comics historian David Roach curated an anthology of romance comics for Rebellion's Treasury of British Comics label called A Very British Affair - The Best of Classic Romance Comics in 2023, and included the strip "Ann and Pam" from the 13 July 1963 edition of Roxy. The collection received positive reviews.
