= Sverre Årnes =

Norwegian writer

Sverre Årnes (born 14 May 1949) is a Norwegian writer who, since 1978, has published 220 book titles, mostly serial novels, about a thousand short stories as well as numerous articles.

He is best known for his serial trilogy Storset saga, which includes the series Jordmoren, Lokketoner, and Hjertets røst. Jordmoren was the first very long Norwegian series, 66 titles, also translated into Polish (Akuzerka). He used a female pseudonym, Sigrid Lunde.

He won a competition, the best serial novel, in 2018; the first title published Oct. 2019. He then moved from Cappelen-Damm to Bladkompaniet.

A native of Møre og Romsdal county's Surnadal Municipality, which consists of a large valley comprising numerous smaller valleys and villages, Sverre Årnes has written the book serial Blodsbånd [Blood Ties] (25 titles, 1994–97, republished 2004–05), Vaterlandsjenta [The Girl from Vaterland] (16 titles, 2003–05) and action thrillers COBRA (8 titles from 1987, twice republished) as well as several adult comic script/stories (including the Phantom and Agent 007).

All the Phantom stories are published in Sweden, Norway, and probably in Australia. Some are published in Finland, and a few in the UK, Hungary, and the Czech Republic.

In addition to another series of novels, Viking, he initiated and wrote the script for the popular comic magazine Olsenbanden, based on characters from a well-known movie serial. He is now making annual scripts to Vangsgutane. He has also written and directed prize-winning short movies, and the script for director Oddvar Bull Tuhus' 1988 theatrical feature Blücher. A recipient in London of the 1986 "Daily Mail Trophy" as writer and director, he was also awarded the 2004 Gold Medal in Austria's Euro film Movie Competition for filmmaking skills as a writer, director, and editor.

In 2003, Sverre Årnes moved with his wife Florlien to her native Philippines, with their daughter Angelina Maria. Since 2012 he has lived in Cebu, Norway, and Gran Canaria.
