= Doug Moench =

American comic book writer (born 1948)

- Born: Douglas Moench; February 23, 1948 (age 78) Chicago, Illinois, U.S.
- Area: Writer
- Notable works: Batman; Coldblood; Deathlok; Detective Comics; Electric Warrior; Lords of the Ultra-Realm; Master of Kung Fu; Moon Knight
- Awards: Eagle Award, 1977; Inkpot Award, 1981

Douglas Moench (/mʌntʃ/; born February 23, 1948, in Chicago, Illinois) is an American writer of comics, novels, short stories, newspaper feature articles, weekly newspaper comic strips, film screenplays and teleplays. He is notable for his Batman work and as the creator of Moon Knight, Deathlok, Black Mask, Harvey Bullock, Electric Warrior, and Six from Sirius; he is also known for his critically acclaimed eight-year run on Master of Kung Fu.

== Early life ==
Moench's first published work was My Dog Sandy, a comic strip printed in his elementary school newspaper. Moench had a fan letter printed in The Amazing Spider-Man issue #17 (Oct. 1964) in which he praised the art of Steve Ditko and others printed in Avengers #51 (April 1968), Captain America #102 (June 1968), and Silver Surfer #14 (March 1970). He began his professional writing career with scripts for Eerie #29 and Vampirella #7 (both cover dated September 1970) and articles for the Chicago Sun-Times. In 1973, he moved to New York City.

== Career ==
Moench began working for Marvel Comics in 1973, with his first story for the company appearing in Chamber of Chills #7 (November 1973). The following year, Moench became the de facto lead writer for the Marvel black-and-white magazine imprint Curtis Magazines. He contributed to the entire runs of Planet of the Apes and Doc Savage, while serving as a regular scribe for virtually every other Curtis title during the course of the imprint's existence. For Marvel's color comic line, Moench wrote the Werewolf by Night title and followed Steve Englehart as writer of Master of Kung Fu. Moench scripted the "Deathlok" feature in Astonishing Tales featuring the character co-created by Rich Buckler. Moench and artist Don Perlin introduced Moon Knight in Werewolf by Night #32 (August 1975). The character of Moon Knight would then go on to be featured in other Marvel titles, eventually getting his own solo series in 1980. Moench and George Pérez launched The Inhumans series in October 1975 while "Weirdworld" was created by Moench and Mike Ploog in Marvel Super Action #1 (January 1976).

Continuing his work for the black-and white magazine line, Moench and Walt Simonson debuted The Rampaging Hulk in January 1977. The series was retitled The Hulk! with issue #10 and switched to a full-color format. Two licensed properties which Moench worked on with Herb Trimpe were Godzilla and Shogun Warriors.

Moench is a frequent and longtime collaborator with comics artist Paul Gulacy. The pair are probably best known for their work on Master of Kung Fu, which they worked on together from 1974 to 1977. Comics historian Les Daniels observed that "Ingenious writing by Doug Moench and energetic art by Paul Gulacy brought Master of Kung Fu new life." In 2010, Comics Bulletin ranked Moench and Gulacy's work on Master of Kung-Fu sixth on its list of the "Top 10 1970s Marvels". Moench and Gulacy later co-created Six from Sirius, Slash Maraud, and S.C.I. Spy, and have worked together on comics projects featuring Batman, Conan the Barbarian and James Bond.

In late August 1982, Moench left Marvel due to disagreements with then editor-in-chief Jim Shooter. He was hired by DC, and from 1983 to 1986 he wrote Batman and Detective Comics. He co-created new villains including Nightslayer in Detective Comics #529 (Aug. 1983) Black Mask in Batman #386 (Aug. 1985), and the Film Freak in Batman #395 (May 1986). He and artist Don Newton produced the story in which Jason Todd replaces Dick Grayson as Robin in Batman #368 (February 1984). His first run on the title ended with issue #400, which featured work by several popular comics artists and included an introduction by novelist Stephen King. In his second run on the title from 1992 to 1998, Moench was one of the writers of the "Knightfall" storyline and wrote Batman #500 in which the character Azrael replaced Bruce Wayne as Batman. The "KnightsEnd" arc which saw the return of Bruce Wayne to the role of Batman was co-written by Moench as well. Other Batman storylines which Moench contributed to include "Contagion", "Legacy", and "Cataclysm".

Working at DC Comics in the 1980s, Moench wrote Omega Men and The Spectre. He was one of the contributors to the DC Challenge limited series in 1986 and co-created Electric Warrior with artist Jim Baikie; Lords of the Ultra-Realm with Pat Broderick; and Slash Maraud with Gulacy.

Moench has frequently been paired with the artist and inker team of Kelley Jones and John Beatty on several Elseworlds graphic novels, including Batman & Dracula: Red Rain and a long run of the monthly Batman comic. In 1994, Moench co-wrote the Batman-Spawn: War Devil intercompany crossover with Chuck Dixon and Alan Grant.

== Personal life ==
Moench and his wife, Debra, have a son, Derek. As of 2018, Moench lives in Pennsylvania.

== Awards and nominations ==
- 1972: Nominated for Chicago Newspaper Guild Award
- 1977: Eagle Award for Favorite Continued Comic Story for Master of Kung Fu #48–51 with Paul Gulacy
- 1978: Nominated at the Eagle Awards for Favourite Single Story for Marvel Premiere #38: The Lord of Tyndall's Quest with Mike Ploog
- 1979: Nominated at the Eagle Awards for Best Comic Book Writer (US), and for Best Continued Story for Captain Marvel #58–62 with Pat Broderick
- 1980: Nominated at the Eagle Awards for Favourite Comicbook Writer
- 1981: Inkpot Award
- 1990: Nominated at the Haxtur Awards for Best Long Comic Strip for Slash Maraud with Paul Gulacy
- 1997: Nominated at the Haxtur Awards for Best Long Comic Strip for Batman Versus Predator II

== Comics bibliography (selected) ==
=== Dark Horse Comics ===
- Dark Horse Comics #25 ("James Bond 007: Minute of Midnight")
- Ghost and The Shadow #1
- James Bond 007: Serpent's Tooth (1992)

=== DC Comics ===
- Arion, Lord of Atlantis #4–11 (1983)
- Batman #0, 360–400, 481–559, 1,000,000 and Annual #10, 12, 13, 17–21 (1983–1986, 1992–1998)
- Batman 80-Page Giant #1 (1998)
- Batman: Blackgate: Isle of Men (1998)
- Batman: Book of the Dead #1–2 (Elseworlds) (1999)
- Batman: Brotherhood of the Bat (Elseworlds) (1995)
- The Batman Chronicles #1–3, 23 (1995–2001)
- Batman: Dark Joker: The Wild (Elseworlds) (1993)
- Batman & Dracula: Red Rain (the first of three Batman vampire Elseworlds graphic novels) (1991)
  - Batman: Bloodstorm (the second Batman vampire Elseworlds saga) (1995)
  - Batman: Crimson Mist (the third Batman vampire Elseworlds saga) (1999)
- Batman: Haunted Gotham #1–4 (Elseworlds) (2000)
- Batman: Hong Kong #1 (2003)
- Batman: Knight Gallery #1 (1995)
- Batman: League of Batmen #1-2 (Elseworlds) (2001)
- Batman: Legends of the Dark Knight #11–15 ("Batman: Prey"), 46–49, 86–88, 137–141, 146–148 (1990–2001)
- Batman: Masterpieces (1998)
- Batman: Outlaws #1–3 (2000)
- Batman Secret Files and Origins (1997)
- Batman: Unseen #1–5 (2009–2010)
- Batman Versus Predator II: Bloodmatch #1–4 (1994–1995)
- Batman-Spawn: War Devil (co-written with Chuck Dixon and Alan Grant) (1994)
- Blackhawk vol. 3 #12–16 (1990)
- Catwoman #0, 25, 38–55 (1994–1998)
- Catwoman: Guardian of Gotham #1–2 (Elseworlds: Batman and Catwoman's roles are reversed) (1999)
- Celebrate the Century Super Heroes Stamp Album #1 (1999)
- COPS #1–15 (1988–1989)
- DC Challenge #3 (1986)
- DC Science Fiction Graphic Novel #7 (adaptation by Moench, Pat Broderick, and Neal McPheeters of the Sandkings novelette by George R. R. Martin) (1987)
- Detective Comics #527–566 (1983–1986)
- Electric Warrior #1–18 (1986–1987)
- Forbidden Tales of Dark Mansion #11 (1973)
- G.I. Combat #163 (1973)
- Green Arrow vol. 2 #86 (1994)
- Green Lantern Corps Quarterly #1–2 (1992)
- Green Lantern: Dragon Lord #1–3 (a Green Lantern mini-series set in ancient China) (2001)
- Heroes Against Hunger #1 (1986)
- House of Mystery #216, 228, 244, 253 (1973–1977)
- House of Secrets #113 (1973)
- JLA: Act of God #1–3 (Elseworlds) (2000-2001)
- Lords of the Ultra-Realm #1–6, Special #1 (co-created by Moench and Pat Broderick) (1986–1987)
- Mister Miracle vol. 2 #14–28 (1990–1991)
- Omega Men #17–20, 22, 23, 25, Annual #1 (1984–1985)
- Our Army at War #271 featuring Sgt. Rock (1974)
- S.C.I. Spy #1–6 (2002)
- Showcase '93 #1–12 (1993)
- Slash Maraud #1–6 (1987–1988)
- The Spectre vol. 2 #1–31, Annual #1 (1987–1989)
- Teen Titans Spotlight #12 (1987)
- The Wanderers #1–13 (1988–1989)
- World's Finest Comics #289–292 (1983)
- Xenobrood #0, 1–6 (1994–1995)

==== Paradox Press ====
- The Big Book of Conspiracies (1995)
- The Big Book of The Unexplained (1997)

=== Eclipse Comics ===
- Aztec Ace
- Nightmares #1–2
- Miracleman #14 (backup story: "Nuclear Spring")
- Total Eclipse #2 (Aztec Ace backup story)

=== HM Communications ===
- More Than Human, in Heavy Metal magazine vol. 2, issues #2 (June 1978), #3 (July 1978), and #4 (August 1978). Adaptation of the Theodore Sturgeon novel of the same name, illustrated by Alex Niño. Trade paperback collection co-published in 1979 by HM Communications and Simon & Schuster as Heavy Metal Presents Theodore Sturgeon's More Than Human

=== Last Gasp ===
- Grim Wit #2

=== Marvel Comics ===
- Adventure into Fear #25–28 (starring Morbius) (1974–1975)
- Astonishing Tales #25–27, 30–31 (Deathlok) (1974–1975)
- Bizarre Adventures #26, 28, 33 (1981–1982)
- Captain Marvel #56, 58–62 (1978–1979)
- Chamber of Chills #7 (1973)
- Conan the Barbarian: The Skull of Set graphic novel (1989)
- Creatures on the Loose featuring Man-Wolf #30–31 (1974)
- The Deep (comic book adaptation of the Columbia Pictures movie) (1977)
- Epic Illustrated #3, 5, 9, 11–13, 33 (1980–1985)
- Fantastic Four #219, 222–231, Annual #15 (1980–1981)
- The Frankenstein Monster #12–17 (1974–1975)
- Ghost Rider vol. 2 #5 (1974)
- Giant-Size Chillers #1 (1975)
- Giant-Size Master of Kung-Fu #1–4 (1974–1975)
- Giant Size Werewolf #2–5 (1974–1975)
- Godzilla #1–24 (1977–1979)
- The Incredible Hulk Annual #9 (1980)
- Inhumans #1–8, 10–12 (1975–1977)
- The Island of Dr. Moreau (comic book adaptation of the American International Pictures film) (1977)
- Ka-Zar vol. 2 #10–20 (1975–1977)
- King Conan #9–15 (1982–1983)
- Kull the Conqueror #16–20 (1976–1977)
- Kull the Conqueror vol. 2 #2 (1983)
- Marvel Classics Comics #13, 16, 19, 21, 22, 25, 27, 29–30, 32–36 (adaptations of classic novels) (1977–1979)
- Marvel Comics Presents #1–8 (Shang Chi, Master of Kung Fu), 26–35 (Coldblood) (1988–1989)
- Marvel Fanfare #24–26 (Weirdworld) (1986)
- Marvel Premiere #17–19 (Iron Fist), #38 (Weirdworld), #41 (Seeker 3000), #61 (Star-Lord) (1974–1981)
- Marvel Spotlight #28–29 (Moon Knight) (1976)
- Marvel Spotlight vol. 2 #1–3 (Captain Marvel), #6-7 (Star-Lord) (1979–1980)
- Marvel Super Special #10 (Star-Lord), #11–13 (Weirdworld) (1979)
- Marvel Two-in-One Annual #6 (1981)
- Master of Kung Fu #21–52, 54–63, 65–101, 103–120 122, Annual #1 (1974–1983)
- Master of Kung Fu: Bleeding Black #1 (1991)
- Shang-Chi: Master of Kung Fu: Hellfire Apocalypse #1–6 (Marvel MAX) (2002–2003)
- Moon Knight #1–15, 17–26, 28–33 (1980–1983)
- Moon Knight: High Strangers #1–4 (1999)
- Moon Knight: The Resurrection #1–4 (1997)
- Moon Knight Special Featuring Master of Kung Fu #1 (1992)
- Shogun Warriors #1–14, 16–20 (1979–1980)
- Thor #303, 308, 310–322, 324–328 (1981–1983)
- The Toxic Avenger #1–11 (based on the Troma Films character) (1991–1992)
- Werewolf by Night #20–43 (1974–1977)
- What If? #16 (featuring "What If Shang Chi Master of Kung Fu Fought on the Side of Fu Manchu?") (1979)
- Wolverine: Doombringer #1 (1997)
- X-Men Unlimited #25 (1999)

==== Curtis Magazines ====
Marvel's black-and-white magazine imprint

- Deadly Hands of Kung Fu #3–14, 16–18, 29, 33, Special #1 (featuring Shang-Chi: Master of Kung Fu) (1974–1977)
- Doc Savage #1–8 (1975–1977)
- Dracula Lives! #2–3, 5–6, 8–12 (1974–1975)
- Haunt of Horror #2–5, 12 (1974–1975)
- The Hulk! #10–22 (1978–1980)
- Kull and the Barbarians #3 (1975)
- Legion of Monsters #1 (1975)
- Marvel Preview #1, #5–6 (adaptation of the Sherlock Holmes story The Hound of the Baskervilles), #8 (Legion of Monsters), #12–13, 18, 21–22, 26, 28, 33 (1976–1980)
- Marvel Super Action #1 (first Weirdworld story) (1976)
- Monsters of the Movies #1, 8 (1974–1975)
- Monsters Unleashed #5–11 (1974–1975)
- Planet of the Apes #1–29 (adaptations of the Apes films and original spinoff tales including the "Terror on the Planet of the Apes" saga) (1974–1977)
- The Rampaging Hulk #1–9 (1977–1978)
- Savage Sword of Conan #5, 9, 13, 14, 180 (1975–1990)
- Savage Tales (featuring Conan and Ka-Zar) #5, 7–8, 11 (1974–1975)
- Tales of the Zombie #2–7, 9–10, Annual #1 (1974–1975)
- Unknown Worlds of Science Fiction #3, 6 (1975)
- Vampire Tales #2, 4–7, 9–11, Annual #1 (1974–1975)

==== Epic Comics ====
- Six from Sirius #1–4 (1984)
- Six from Sirius II #1–4 (1985–1986)

==== Malibu Comics ====
- Rune: Hearts of Darkness #1–3 (1996)

=== Skywald Publications ===
- Nightmare #9–12, 14, Annual #1, Yearbook 1974
- Psycho #5–6, 9, 11, 13, 16

=== TSR, Inc. ===
- R.I.P. Brasher: Avenger of the Dead #1–4

=== Warren Publishing ===
- Eerie #29–30, 35–45, 47, 50, 53–55, 57–58, 72, 78, 109–112
- Creepy #37, 46–47, 49–54, 56–59, 64–66, 68, 71–72, 76, 80, 82, 88
- Vampirella #7, 9, 14–15, 17–20, 24–29, 31, 34, 39

== Non-comics bibliography (selected) ==
Moench wrote book, movie, and music reviews for Fling, and he wrote for several other men's magazines, including Adam, Cavalier, Knight, Man to Man and Swingle. He wrote several articles for Midwest, the Sunday magazine of the Chicago Sun-Times. For the never-published WLS Generation, he interviewed The Who, The Monkees, and The Seeds. Moench wrote an article called "23 on the 23rd" a true story about his own 23rd birthday.

- Batman Masters Collection – Set of 120 trading cards, with front art by artists Scott Hampton, Carl Critchlow, Duncan Fegredo, and Dermot Power. The flip sides of the first 90 cards, when read in order, form a storyline in which Batman fakes his own death. The set provides a look at the posthumous feelings of the residents of Gotham City and Arkham Asylum towards the Dark Knight. A special collector's binder was released for the card set. This card set was reprinted as a 208-page coffeetable book entitled Batman Masterpieces. It contains full-page reproductions of the card art opposite the card's text (so one can still follow the story), art concepts (instructions to the artists) and comments by the artist. Additionally, early sketches have been printed for most of the cards.
- Batgirl: To Dare the Darkness – A young-reader novel that was released with the marketing blitz for the Batman & Robin movie, set immediately after the events of the film.
- Bucky O'Hare – Teleplay for one episode.
- Double Dragon – Series bible for the cartoon released by DiC Entertainment.
- The Forensic Files of Batman – A short story collection about how Batman uses clues found at crime scenes to foil the plans of his most famous villains. Each chapter is a different case presented from the notes, journals, and case files of the Batman, Bruce Wayne, Alfred Pennyworth, and Jim Gordon.
- Mighty Mouse: The New Adventures – Story editor and head writer for the 1980s animated series.
- Red Sonja – Original screenplay for the Red Sonja movie. The movie was later rewritten and changed quite a bit from Moench's version.

Preceded by Mike Friedrich	Werewolf by Night writer 1974–1977	Succeeded by n/a
Preceded by Steve Englehart	Master of Kung Fu writer 1974–1983	Succeeded by Alan Zelenetz
Preceded by John Byrne	Fantastic Four writer 1980–1981	Succeeded by John Byrne
Preceded by Mark Gruenwald and Ralph Macchio	Thor writer 1981–1983	Succeeded by Alan Zelenetz
Preceded by Gerry Conway	Detective Comics writer 1983–1986	Succeeded by Mike W. Barr
Preceded by Gerry Conway	Batman writer 1983–1986	Succeeded by Barbara Randall
Preceded by Len Wein	Mister Miracle vol. 2 writer 1990–1991	Succeeded by n/a
Preceded by Alan Grant	Batman writer 1992–1998	Succeeded by Chuck Dixon
Preceded by Chuck Dixon	Catwoman vol. 2 writer 1997–1998	Succeeded by Devin Grayson
