= Marilyn (comics) =

British weekly girls' romance comic

- The cover to Marilyn, dated 5 September 1959.

Publication information
- Publisher: Amalgamated Press; 1955 to 1959; Fleetway Publications; 1959 to 1965
- Schedule: Weekly
- Format: Ongoing series
- Genre: Romance
- Publication date: 19 March 1955 – 18 November 1965
- No. of issues: 547 or 549 (Note: Comics historian Denis Gifford gives the figure as 547, but the comic's run encompasses 549 weeks. Due to incomplete documentation and archival materials it is unclear currently if the comic was published every week as not all issues were numbered.)

Creative team
- Written by: Eileen Corduroy; Jim Edgar; Barbara Hale; Derek Long; Joan Whitford
- Artist(s): María Barrera; Daniel Billon; Joan Riley; Vicente Roso; Manfred Sommer; K. M. Waterson
- Editor(s): Robert Lewis

Marilyn was a British girls romance comic published weekly by Amalgamated Press and Fleetway Publications between 19 March 1955 and 18 November 1965. It ran for between 547 and 549 issues before merging with Valentine.

== Creation ==
Amalgamated Press editor Robert Lewis had launched the digest-sized Love Picture Library in 1950 and found an unexpected audience with older girls and young women. A companion volume, True Life, joined it in 1952 and was again a strong seller, and in 1955 the company decided to publish Britain's first weekly romance comic. Marilyn was a 24-page newsprint title, featuring duotone front covers (with a red overlay) and monochrome interiors. Inside it featured a mix of picture strips (both standalone and serialised stories), text stories and a smattering of features such as horoscopes and an agony aunt, in the form of Joan Courage. The comic was published every Thursday.

Lewis initially drew the contributors for Marilyn from the Picture Library staff, with scripts written by the likes of Eileen Corduroy, Jim Edgar, Barbara Hale, Derek Long and Joan Whitford (who was also a hugely popular writer of Westerns for Sun, Comet and Knockout under the pen name Barry Ford), and art contributed by Joan Riley and K. M. Waterson. The comic was aimed at working class teenagers and women.

== Publishing history ==
The first issue featured a free "Persian Love Ring". Marilyn was a swift success, so much so that Amalgamated Press swiftly launched more titles, with weeklies Valentine (1957), Roxy (1958) and Serenade (1962). The titles were further enhanced when Fleetway Publications (as Amalgamated Press had become when they were purchased by the Mirror Group in 1960) began employing overseas art studios. María Barrera, Daniel Billon, Vicente Roso and Manfred Sommer were among those to contribute to Marilyn. Susan Brewer has speculated that the title was probably named for actress Marilyn Monroe. Sales reached 400,000 copies, and Marilyn even sponsored a concert on Radio Luxembourg, featuring Ronnie Hilton backed by the Jackie Brown Orchestra. Other tie-ins included Marilyn Screen Test records, in which aspiring starlets could act out a scene with a star by purchasing a record featuring a recording of a male heart-throb's dialogue and a script for the response.

Later issues included celebrity columns, including "Trad Times" and "Jazz Mirror", purportedly edited by Mr. Acker Bilk and Kenny Ball respectively, and by 1964 "Beatlebox" saw The Beatles apparently answering readers' questions; the Fab Four's responses to poems, camera trickery in A Hard Day's Night and Ringo's real name were in fact from the pen of NEMS Enterprises press officer Tony Barrow. However, rival publishers also got in on the act - and the mid-1960s DC Thomson's Jackie and Romeo had successfully eclipsed the Fleetway titles as the fashionable choice. As the oldest title, Marilyn was considered the most dated and was incorporated into Valentine in 1965, where "Beatlebox" would continue.

In 2018 Rebellion Developments purchased the rights to the pre-1970 Amalgamated Press/Fleetway/IPC comic titles, including Marilyn. However, this did not include a complete archive as much of the original artwork and negatives had long been lost, instead having to be scanned from original comics and artwork either from private purchases or loaned by collectors. 2000 AD artist and comics historian David Roach curated an anthology of romance comics for Rebellion's Treasury of British Comics label called A Very British Affair: The Best of Classic Romance Comics in 2023, and noted that even fewer original issues survived than of boys' comics. In the book's introduction he suggested that early issues of Marilyn in particular may no longer exist. He was however able to include four stories from Marilyn in the collection, which received positive reviews.
