= Northampton Herald & Post =

Former British newspaper

Northants Herald & Post
- Front page in new format from 11 July 2013
- Type: Local newspaper
- Format: Tabloid
- Owner: Localworld
- Editor: Steve Scoles
- Founded: 1975; 51 years ago
- Ceased publication: 1 December 2016
- Language: English
- Headquarters: 4 Waterside Way, The Lakes, Northampton NN4 7XD
- Circulation: 45,582
- Price: Free
- Sister newspapers: Wellingborough, Rushden, Kettering and Corby Herald & Post; Market Harborough Herald & Post; Brackley & Towcester Herald & Post
- Website: www.northampton-news-hp.co.uk

Old front page format prior to 11 July 2013

The Northants Herald & Post was a local weekly newspaper distributed free of charge in Northampton, England, and the surrounding towns and villages. The distribution also included the town of Towcester following the closure of local paid-for newspapers. It was closed by owners Trinity Mirror in December 2016.

== Publication history ==
The newspaper was founded as the Northants Post in 1975 by a company managed by businessman and journalist Tony Boullemier, who worked for the Daily Express, where he was chief sub-editor. Boullemier was born in Newcastle and originally trained on news and sport with the Newcastle Journal.

Boullemier and his partners, his wife Marie, Ben Clingain, Richard Pinkham, and for the early years, Richard Meredith, expanded the operation into a group of 16 papers and magazines circulating nearly 400,000 copies a week throughout the east Midlands, before selling the titles to Thomson Regional Newspapers. The group was later sold to Trinity Mirror.

In 2008 Trinity Mirror carried out a shakeup of its UK Midlands operations seeking job cuts and integration. Trinity decided it would either close the title or sell it. The paper was acquired by LSN Media Ltd (LSN standing for Local Sunday Newspapers). LSN Media publish 13 newspapers across three counties, most of them in Northamptonshire and Bedfordshire. Iliffe News & Media Ltd are the owners of LSN (which was acquired in August 2005). Iliffe News & Media are in turn part of the family-owned Yattendon Group, which publishes three daily and nearly 30 weekly paid-for and freesheet newspapers across eastern and central England, notably the Cambridge News, the Burton Mail and the Hertfordshire Mercury series. The company dates back to 1840 and was originally a ribbonmakers.

The paper's offices were originally in Derngate, Northampton, until 2012, when they were relocated to Lakeside, an office park off the Bedford Road on the eastern outskirts of the town.

In January 2013 the Northampton Herald & Post became part of Localworld, which subsequently sold out to Trinity Mirror.

In January 2014 the paper's name was changed to the Northants Herald & Post.

On 1 December 2016 Trinity Mirror closed the title down.

== Other local papers ==
The Herald & Post's main competitor was the weekly Northampton Mercury and Citizen, also delivered free with a circulation of 53,562. This was a cut-down version of the paid-for weekly Northampton Chronicle & Echo which has larger news and editorial sections.

== See also ==
- List of newspapers in the United Kingdom
- Herald & Post e-edition
