= List of James Bond comics =

This is a list of comics featuring James Bond.

== English ==
Title	Year	Publisher	Author(s)	Artist(s)
Doctor No (movie tie-in)	1962	Classics Illustrated (UK); DC Comics (US); Dell Publishing (Europe)	Norman Nodel	
For Your Eyes Only (Note: Marvel published its adaptation of For Your Eyes Only in three formats: a two-issue comic book miniseries, a single-volume magazine-sized edition (as part of its Marvel Super Special series), and as a paperback novel-sized edition by its subsidiary, Marvel Illustrated Books (ISBN 0-9604146-4-9).) (movie tie-in)	1981	Marvel Comics	Larry Hama	Howard Chaykin/Vince Colletta
Octopussy (movie tie-in)	1983	Marvel Comics	Steve Moore	Paul Neary
Licence to Kill (movie tie-in)	1989	Eclipse Comics	Richard Ashford	Mike Grell
Permission to Die	1989–1991	Eclipse Comics	Mike Grell	Mike Grell
Secret Agents (Note: Unauthorized comic book biographies of James Bond actors Sean Connery, Roger Moore, and Timothy Dalton.)	1991–1992	Personality Comics	Delmo Walters, Jr.	Delmo Walters, Jr.
Serpent's Tooth	1992–1993	Dark Horse Comics (many packaged by Acme Comics)	Doug Moench	Paul Gulacy
A Silent Armageddon (incomplete)	1993	Dark Horse Comics (many packaged by Acme Comics)	Simon Jowett	John M. Burns
Light of My Death	1993	Dark Horse Comics (many packaged by Acme Comics)	Das Petrou	John Watkiss
Shattered Helix	1994	Dark Horse Comics (many packaged by Acme Comics)	Simon Jowett	David Jackson/David Lloyd
Minute of Midnight	1994	Dark Horse Comics (many packaged by Acme Comics)	Doug Moench	Russ Heath
The Quasimodo Gambit	1995	Dark Horse Comics (many packaged by Acme Comics)	Don McGregor	Gary Caldwell
GoldenEye (movie tie-in) (incomplete)	1996	Topps Comics	Don McGregor	Rick Magyar
Vargr	2015–2016	Dynamite Entertainment	Warren Ellis	Jason Masters
Eidolon	2016	Dynamite Entertainment	Warren Ellis	Jason Masters
Hammerhead	2016–2017	Dynamite Entertainment	Andy Diggle	Luca Casalanguida
Felix Leiter (spin-off)	2017	Dynamite Entertainment	James Robinson	Aaron Campbell
Black Box	2017	Dynamite Entertainment	Benjamin Percy	Rapha Lobosco
Service	2017	Dynamite Entertainment	Kieron Gillen	Antonio Fuso
Kill Chain	2017	Dynamite Entertainment	Andy Diggle	Luca Casalanguida
Moneypenny (spin-off)	2017	Dynamite Entertainment	Jody Houser	Jacob Edgar
Solstice	2017	Dynamite Entertainment	Ibrahim Moustafa	
The Body	2018	Dynamite Entertainment	Ales Kot	Luca Casalanguida (Issue #1, #6); Antonio Fuso (Issue #2); Rapha Lobosco (Issue #3); Eoin Marron (Issue #4); Hayden Sherman (Issue #5)
M (spin-off)	2018	Dynamite Entertainment	Declan Shalvey	P.J. Holden
Casino Royale (adaptation)	2018	Dynamite Entertainment	Ian Fleming (novel); Van Jensen (adaptation)	Dennis Calero
James Bond Origin	2018–2019	Dynamite Entertainment	Jeff Parker	Bob Q
The Odd Job Epic	2018–2019	Dynamite Entertainment	Greg Pak	Marc Laming (issues #1, #2, #,3); Stephen Mooney (Issue #4, #5, #6)

=== James Bond Jr. ===
Comic adaptation by Marvel based on the animated television serial.

- 1992 #1 The Beginning!
- The Eiffel Missile!
- Earth-cracker!
- Plunder Down Under!
- Dance of the Toreadors!
- original story The Gilt Complex
- Sure as Eggs is Eggs!
- Wave Goodbye to the USA!
- Absolute Zero!
- Friends like these!
- Indian Summer!
- Homeward bound!

=== Junior James Bond Secret Agent 005. ===
A series of comics mostly in Hindi published in India in the Eighties by the now defunct Chitra Bharthi Kathamala. English titles include:

- Thief with a Difference
- International Killer
- Road to the Jail!
- Back to the Jail!
- The Killers!
- The Traitors
- A Band of Robbers

=== Compilation ===
The James Bond 007 Annual

- 6 comic stories, 1965.
- 6 comic stories, 1967.
- Live and Let Die (from novel) 1968.

== Swedish ==
These comics were all published by Semic Press.

Year	#	Swedish Title	English Title
1967	1	Död Och Diamanter	Death and Diamonds – Diamonds Are Forever
1967	2	Risico – De Hänsynslösa Opiumsmugglarna	Risico – The Ruthless Opium Smugglers
1967	3	I Hennes Majestäts Hemliga Tjänst	On Her Majesty's Secret Service
1967	4	Djävulens Trädgård – Man Lever Bara Två Gånger!	Devil's Garden – You Only Live Twice!
1968	5	Dödligt Uppdrag	Fatal Assignment – From A View to a Kill
1968	6	Spionen från öst	The Spy From the East – The Living Daylights
1968	7	Manden Med Den Gyllene Pistole	The Man with the Golden Gun
1968	8	Octopussy – Undervattensdöden	Octopussy – Underwater Death
1968	9	Ubåt Saknad!	Submarine Miss! – The Hildebrand Rarity
1969	10	Operation Spökflyg	The Spy Who Loved Me [Part 1]
1969	11	Skräcknatten	Fright Night – The Spy Who Loved Me [Part 2]
1969	12	Fågelkvinnorna	Bird Woman – The Harpies
1970	13	Dödens Flod	The Dead River – River of Death
1971	14	Goldfinger	Goldfinger
1971	15	Dödligt Toppmöte	Mortal Top Rendezvous – Colonel Sun
1971	16	Leva Och Låta Dö	Live And Let Die
1971	17	Det Gyllene Spöket	The Golden Ghost
1972	18	Högt Spel I Monte Carlo	High Game in Monte Carlo – Casino Royale
1972	19	Dödens Dubbelgångare	Dead Doppelganger- Double Jeopardy
1972	20	Diamantfeber	Diamond Fever – Diamonds Are Forever
1972	21	Stålspionen	Steel Spy – Fear Face
1973	22	Döden På Jamaica	Death at Jamaica- Dr No
1973	23	Bond Avslöjar Stjärnornas Herre	Bond Reveals Star Man – Star Fire
1973	24	?	From Russia With Love
1973	25	Dödligt Budskap	Fatal Message -Trouble Spot
1974	26	?	Thunderball
1974	27	Kondorernas ö	Isle of Condors
1974	28	Ur Dödlig Synvinkel	"From A Fatal Angle" – For Your Eyes Only
1974	29	Droghandlarna	Die with My Boots On
1974	30	Moonraker Betyder Döden	Moonraker
1974	31	Vampyrligan	The League of Vampires
1975	32	?	On Her Majesty's Secret Service
1975	33	Jakten På Det Svarta Guldet	"Hunt for the Black Gold" – The Girl Machine
1975	34	Mannen Med Dengyllene Pistolen	The Man with the Golden Gun
1975	35	?	Beware of Butterflies
1975	36	Risicologan!	Risico
1975	37	?	The Nevsky Nude
1976	38	Man Lever Bara Två Gånger – Djävulens Trädgård	You Only Live Twice – "Devil Garden"
1976	39	?	The Man with the Golden Gun & The Living Daylights
1976	40	Kodnamn: Svart Storm	"Codename: Black Storm" – The Black Ruby Caper
1976	41	Tävling Med Topp-Vinster! Bond På Jättebild!	"Competition with the Top Prize – Bond at Giant Picture!" – Octopussy
1976	42	Bond Blir Indragen I Projekt Fenix!	"Bond Gets in to Line On..." The Phoenix Project
1976	43	Dödligt Uppdrag	"Fatal Commission" – From A View to a Kill
1977	44	Kontraspionaget Slår Till: Intrig På Balkan!	Till Death Do Us Part
1977	45	Ubåt Saknas	The Hildebrand Rarity
1977	46	En Enkel, Acapulco!	The Torch-Time Affair
1977	47	Operation Spökflyg	The Spy Who Loved Me – Part 1
1977	48	Dödsstrålen	Hot-Shot
1977	49	Bäddat För Bond... Skräcknatten	The Spy Who Loved Me – Part 2
1978	50	Nattfågeln Dödligt Uppdrag För Bond!	Nightbird
1978	51	Det Gyllene Spöket	The Golden Ghost
1978	52	Dödligt Kommando	"Fatal Command" – Ape of Diamonds
1978	53	Farligt Uppdrag: Dödens Dubbelgångare	"Dangerous Commission" – Double Jeopardy
1978	54	Trollkarlen + Stålspionen	"Magician + Steel Spy" – Fear Face & When The Wizard Awakes
1978	55	Fågelkvinnorna	"Bird Woman" – The Harpies
1979	56	Moonraker	Moonraker
1979	57	Dödligt Budskap	Fatal Message -Trouble Spot
1979	58	Operation Big Mama	Sea Dragon
1979	59	Dödens Flod	The Dead River – River of Death
1979	60	Döden På Jamaica	Death at Jamaica- Dr No
1979	61	Operation Deathwing	Death Wing
1980	62	Agent 007 Ser Rött	"Agent 007 See Red" – From Russia With Love
1980	63	Operation Xanadu	The Xanadu Connection
1980	64	Goldfinger	Goldfinger
1980	65	Åskbollen	Thunderball
1980	66	Man Lever Bara Två Gånger	You Only Live Twice
1980	67	Operation Shark Bait	Shark Bait – Part 1
1981	68	Högt Spel I Monte Carlo	High Game in Monte Carlo – Casino Royale
1981	69	I Hennes Majestäts Hemliga Tjänst	On Her Majesty's Secret Service
1981	70	Operation KGB	Shark Bait – Part 2
1981	71	Diamantfeber	Diamond Fever – Diamonds Are Forever
1981	72	Kondorernas ö	Isle of Condors
1981	73	Bond Avslöjar Stjärnornas Herre	Bond Reveals Star Man – Star Fire

== Spanish ==
These were all published by Zig Zag.

- Based on Risico (1968) Operation Risk
- The Hildebrand Rarity
- For Your Eyes Only
- original Le Chiffre story, Deadly Gold
- Gold for Le Chiffre
- (1969) Ultra Secret
- original Le Chiffre story Child's Play
- Casino Royale
- Based on "From A View to a Kill Hunting
- first chapter of "Goldfinger novel Mission in Mexico
- Gold and Death
- Relentless pursuit
- Based on Goldfinger novel Fatal Crossroad
- Based on Goldfinger novel The Gold of Fort Knox
- Berlin Intrigue
- Holiday for a Spy
- The Crime at the Discothèque
- Based on novel "Moonraker Sabotage
- Deadly Safari
- Doctor No
- A Beauty in Distress
- From Russia With Love
- Diamonds are Forever
- The C.I.P.E.T. affair
- The Crows
- The Missing Pilot
- Sacrilege
- start of Thunderball SPECTRE
- The Queen of the Bees
- Intrigue in the Arctic
- (1970) The Silk Cord
- The Hand of Fate
- Based on Thunderball Operation Thunder
- Based on Live and Let Die To Live and to Let Die
- Doubles
- The Beach of Flowers
- The Spy Who Loved Me
- Based on On Her Majesty's Secret Service The Arch-Criminal
- On Her Majesty's Secret Service
- You Only Live Twice
- The Man with the Golden Gun
- Death is amused
- The Executioner
- Bait
- Cry of Freedom
- Danger at Dock 4
- The Prince and the Dragon
- A Warm Summer Afternoon
- Bodyguard
- 5 degrees below zero
- The Saboteurs
- A Pleasure Trip
- Mercenaries
- Inferno in Sicily
- Yeti
- The Golden Dolphin
- (1971) The Rally of Death
- Mystery on TV
- The Condemned

== Japanese ==
Before creating Golgo 13, manga artist Takao Saito drew a serial based on the 007 series that was published monthly in Shogakukan's Boy's Life magazine from December 1964 to August 1967. The manga adapted four of Ian Fleming's original novels and were subsequently republished in collected editions under Shogakukan's Golden Comics imprint during serialization. The collected editions were later reprinted in 1981 under the Shogakukan Bunko imprint, and in 2015 under the Big Comics Special imprint.

- Shinuno wa Yatsura Da 死ぬのは奴らだ [Live and Let Die] (Big Comics Special ed.). 2 December 2015. ISBN 9784091874146.
- Sandābōru Sakusen サンダーボール作戦 [Thunderball] (Big Comics Special ed.). 2 December 2015. ISBN 9784091874108.
- Jo'ō Heika no Zero Zero Sebun 女王陛下の007 [Her Majesty's Secret Service] (Big Comics Special ed.). 28 December 2015. ISBN 9784091875402.
- Ōgon no Jū o Motsu Otoko 黄金の銃を持つ男 [The Man with the Golden Gun] (Big Comics Special ed.). 28 December 2015. ISBN 9784091875457.

== Dutch ==
- Anthology Comic – Doctor No
- Semic – Codename: Nemesis
- The Slave Traders
- Operation: Burma
- Liquidate Bond
- Operation: Little
- The Mad Emperor
- Operation Jungle Devils
- Operation: UFO
- Loempea – Licence To Kill (1989)

== Hungarian ==
These comics were all published by Nyomdai.

- Operation Jungle Devils
- Operation: Blücher
- Codename: Romeo
- The Green Death
- Death in Tahiti
- Chinese Puzzle

== Satire comics ==
- Blitz Weasel Studios — The Blonde Avenger, March 1996
- Cottonwood Graphics — Rick O'Shay, Hipshot and Me, 1990
- DC Comics
  - L.E.G.I.O.N. 94 Annual
  - Animaniacs
- Diamond Comics
  - Deathmask
  - The Mystery of Box
- Dark Horse Comics — Light of My Death
- Marvel Comics
  - Laff and Let Die
  - Live And Let Spy
- Studio Chikara — The Barbi Twins Ashcan
- Topps Comics — The Barbi Twins Adventures
- NOW Comics — Married With Children
- Play Value Books
  - Storm Bringer
  - Blackclaw's Doomsday Plot
- The James Bond 007 Fan Club — The Illustrated James Bond, 007
- Titan Books
  - The Golden Ghost
  - Till Death Do Us Part
  - The Phoenix Project
  - Trouble Spot
  - Shark Bait
  - Death Wing
  - Paradise Plot

=== In humour magazines ===
Mad magazine

- #94 April 1965 007 – A MAD Musical
- #165 March 1974 8 "James Bomb" Bomb Movies: Dr No-No, From Russia With Lunacy, Goldfinger Bowl, Thunderblahh, You Only Live Nice, On His Majesty's Secret Shamus, Dollars are Forever, Live and Let Suffer
- #199 Jun 1978 The Spy Who Glubbed Me
- #213 March 1980 $00 Moneyraker
- #229 March 1982 For Her Thighs Only
- #248 July 1984 Remington Steal: Pierce Brosnan before Bond
- #340 Oct/November 1995 If James Bond Were Updated for the Politically-Correct '90s: Pierce Brosnan as the new, PC Bond.
- #365 Jan. 1998 James Bond Villains' Pet Peeves
- #521 June 2013 Casebook "Skyfail" The Battle of the Bonds

Mad Super Special

- #27 1978 "James Bomb" (reprint)

Cracked magazine

- The Beatles meet James Bond
- 1977 The spy who snubbed me
- 1979 Moonwrecker
- A Cracked look at 007
- #306 March 1996 007-Plasticeye
- Collectors edition April 2000 007's Latest Supercool Spy Gadgets
- #342 March 2002, "The World is Not Enough"

== See also ==
- Outline of James Bond

== Sources ==
- 007 Magazine, Issue 34, 1998
- The Bond Files, Andy Lane and Paul Simpson
- Comic Book Checklist & Price Guide 2007: 1961 to Present, Maggie Thompson
- mi6-hq.com, "The Home of James Bond 007"
