= Aaron Campbell =

Aaron Campbell may refer to:

- Aaron Campbell (born 2002), Scottish murderer guilty of the murder of Alesha MacPhail
- Aaron Campbell (voice actor) (born 1991), American voice actor
- Aaron Campbell, illustrator of James Bond: Felix Leiter and other comic books
