= The Losers (2010 film) =

2010 film by Sylvain White

- Theatrical release poster
- Directed by: Sylvain White
- Screenplay by: Peter Berg; James Vanderbilt
- Based on: The Losers by: Andy Diggle; Jock
- Produced by: Joel Silver; Akiva Goldsman; Kerry Foster
- Starring: Jeffrey Dean Morgan; Zoe Saldana; Chris Evans; Idris Elba; Columbus Short; Oscar Jaenada; Jason Patric
- Cinematography: Scott Kevan
- Edited by: David Checel
- Music by: John Ottman
- Production companies: Dark Castle Entertainment; DC Vertigo; StudioCanal; Weed Road Pictures
- Distributed by: Warner Bros. Pictures
- Release date: April 23, 2010
- Running time: 97 minutes
- Country: United States
- Language: English
- Budget: $25 million
- Box office: $29.9 million

The Losers is a 2010 American action comedy film directed by Sylvain White and written by Peter Berg and James Vanderbilt, based on the comic book series by Andy Diggle and Jock. The film features an ensemble cast starring Jeffrey Dean Morgan, Chris Evans, Zoe Saldaña, Idris Elba, Columbus Short, Óscar Jaenada and Jason Patric.

The film received mixed reviews from critics and drew comparisons to The A-Team, a remake of which was released shortly after The Losers premiered.

== Plot ==
The Losers, an elite black-ops team of United States Special Forces operatives, includes team leader Clay, demo expert Roque, heavy weapon specialist Pooch, hacker Jensen, and sniper Cougar. They are sent to Bolivia on a search-and-destroy mission on a compound run by a drug lord.

While painting a target for an upcoming air strike, the Losers spot trafficked children in the compound and try to call off the attack, but their superior, codenamed Max, ignores their pleas. Out of options, the Losers enter the compound, successfully rescuing the children and killing the drug lord.

As a helicopter arrives to pick them up, Max, convinced that they know too much, orders it to be destroyed, unaware that they decided to rescue the children first. The Losers watch as a missile destroys the helicopter. Knowing that the attack was meant to kill them, they fake their deaths and become stranded in Bolivia, lacking the funds and paperwork necessary to go home.

Four months later, Clay is approached by Aisha, a mysterious woman who offers him the chance to kill Max, against whom she wants revenge. He accepts, so she arranges for the group to return to the United States.

In Miami, the group proceeds to attack a convoy supposedly carrying Max, only to discover Aisha has tricked them into stealing a hard drive with Max's secrets. Jensen infiltrates the company that made the drive and steals an algorithm that allows him to access the files.

The drive contains credits for a $400 million transfer in Max's name, which he received for selling "Snukes" or Sonic Nukes – eco-friendly bombs that use sonic waves to destroy an area the same size as a nuclear warhead can, with no fall-out – to international terrorists. Tracing the money flow to the Los Angeles International Port of Entry, which the Losers deduce is Max's base, they form a plan to attack it and kill Max.

While studying the drive, Jensen discovers that their mission in Bolivia was a cover so Max could eliminate the drug lord, who had discovered his plan, and that Aisha is the man's daughter, seeking revenge for his death. After her cover is blown, Aisha shoots Jensen in the arm and escapes. Believing that she might betray them, the Losers decide to speed up their attack on Max's base, only to be betrayed by Roque and captured by Max and Wade, his right-hand man and chief of security.

Aisha returns and ambushes Max's team to rescue the Losers, despite Clay confirming during the fight that he killed Aisha's father. Roque steals Max's plane, loaded with his money, and tries to escape, pursued by Wade on a motorcycle. Cougar shoots the motorcycle's engine, causing a chain reaction that destroys the plane, killing Wade and Roque. Max then kills the scientist responsible for the Snukes' development after revealing that his true intention is to use the Snukes to spark global conflict to gain power.

As Jensen, Cougar, and Aisha help Pooch, who has been shot in both legs by one of Max's security guards, Clay pursues Max to a crane, where Max says that he has activated a Snuke that will destroy Los Angeles, so Clay has to choose between de-activating it or killing Max.

Clay chooses LA, so Max escapes. However, as Clay affirms he now knows what Max looks like, he is sure he will soon find him. Max escapes on a bus where he is robbed by two thugs. His fate afterwards is unknown.

Meanwhile, the Losers help Pooch reach the hospital where his pregnant wife is giving birth to their son, then they attend Jensen's 8-year-old niece's soccer game.

== Cast ==
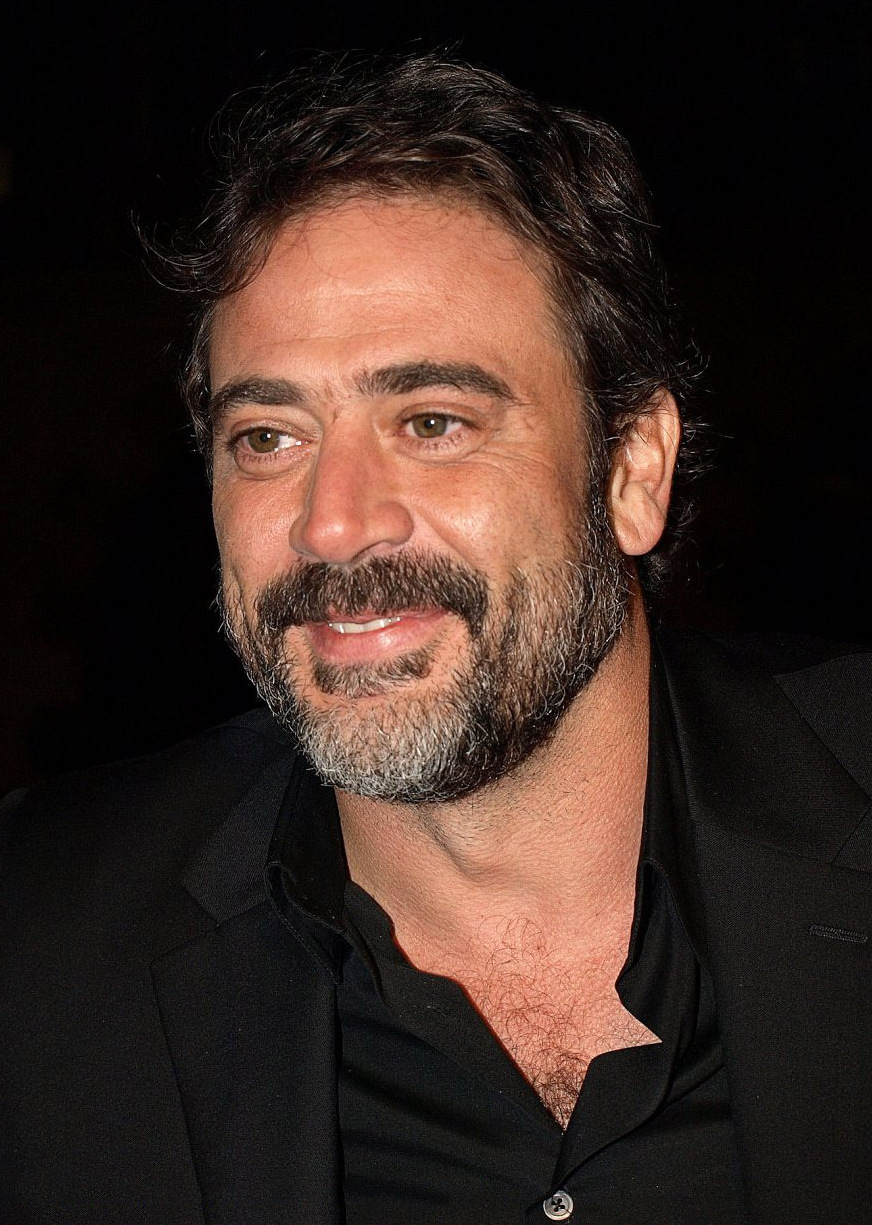
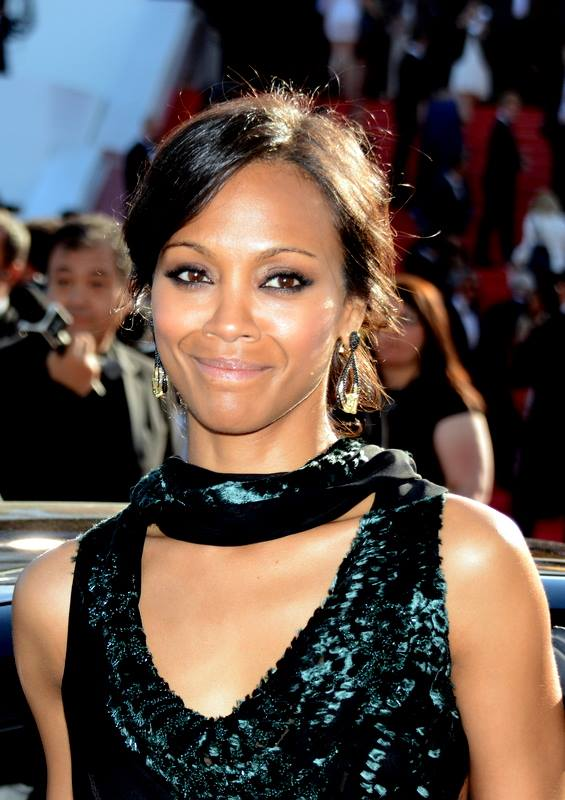
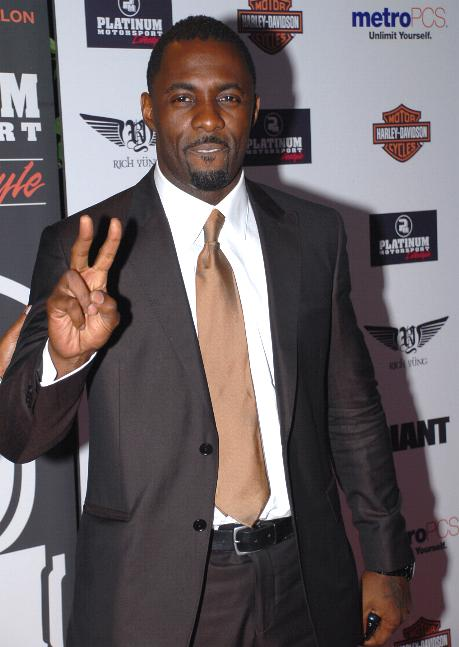
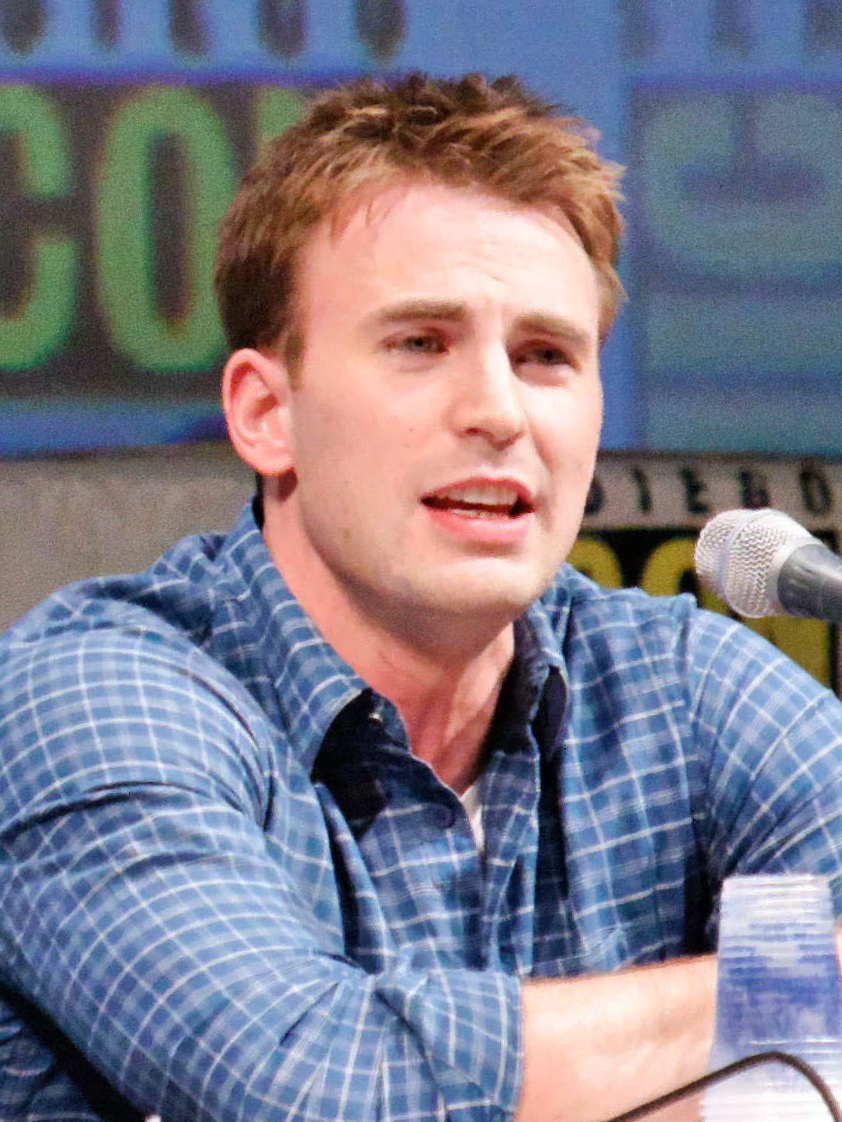
From top to bottom: Jeffrey Dean Morgan, Zoe Saldana, Idris Elba, and Chris Evans
- Jeffrey Dean Morgan as Captain Franklin Clay: A U.S. Army Special Forces lieutenant colonel and the de facto leader of the group. Morgan, who starred in the superhero mystery film Watchmen (2009), felt that playing Clay was far less complicated in comparison to his Watchmen role as Comedian. Because of the radically different approach, Morgan stated that it gave him more freedom and allowed him to be more playful with his character. "This guy has a real, actually much better sense of humor than the Comedian did," said Morgan. "He's not nihilistic. It's completely different. This is much lighter. A much lighter load for me. There's also kind of room for me to interpret this as a project where, in Watchmen, you had to– look, I was playing the Comedian in the most revered comic book ever written. I was confined to that. In this, I could fine-tune a lot of what I thought Frank Clay is and get to play with it a lot more."
- Chris Evans as Captain Jake Jensen: The team's intelligence specialist and computer hacker. Evans professed that portraying the character was considerably different from his previous roles. "He's just a fun guy, you know? He's kind of the comic relief," Evans stated. "He loves life. He's a little nerdy. He's not very smooth... He's not only a fun character because of the energy you get to infuse it with, but who he is, it's kind of against type. I don't really get to play guys who are awkward and uncomfortable at times in certain situations, so it's fun to play him."
- Zoe Saldana as Aisha Al-Fadhil: A native Bolivian woman who offers assistance in locating Max. In preparation for the role, Saldana participated in extensive weapons and physical training. The actress was required to gain a couple of pounds, as she was expected to carry weapons around for eight hours a day. Saldana summated al-Fadhil as a manipulative and mysterious individual. "She's a snake. You don't really know what she's hiding up her sleeve. She definitely had her own prerogative and it's very meaningful for her. She's trying her best to play her cards right, but Jeffrey's character just gets to her. There's just something about him that she's unable to kind of to fill her task, her mission."
- Idris Elba as Captain William Roque: An expert in detonating and deactivating explosives. He is also an expert in knife combat. Elba previously worked with Joel Silver in multiple films, and opined that his ties with Silver helped him sustain a role in the film. "Sylvain White, the director, is someone I've known in the industry, and he said to me 'I've got this thing I'm working on'. And a few directors had looked at the script, and were going to make it, but Sylvain landed it."
- Columbus Short as Sergeant Linwood "Pooch" Porteous: A member who is a specialist in heavy weapons and transportation. He sometimes refers to himself in third person while speaking to the team.
- Oscar Jaenada as Sergeant Carlos "Cougar" Alvarez: The group's sniper. He is precise in long range eliminations and he rarely speaks throughout the film.
- Jason Patric as Max: A corrupt, high ranking government official and arms dealer.
- Holt McCallany as Wade: Max's right-hand man and aide.
- Peter Macdissi as Vikram
- Peter Francis James as Fadhil: The Bolivian drug dealer and terrorist. He is also Aisha's father.
- Tanee McCall as Jolene: Pooch's wife.
- Mark Ginther as Goliath Guard
- Daniel Kalal as Goliath Guard
- Colin Follenweider as Goliath Guard
- Garrett Warren as Goliath Guard
- Rey Hernandez as Armoured Car Guard
- Ernesto Morales as Nabil
- Evan Miranda as Lead Chyron Guard
- Noel Estrella as Indina Thug Leader
- Gunner Wright as Jet Pilot
- Robert Slavonia as Mr. Anderson
- Debbie Ann Rivera as Mr. Anderson's Secretary
- Kirk Sullivan as Transport Helicopter Pilot
- Marcos Davila as Thug on Bus
- Alina M. Salinas as Little Girl at Compound
- Manuel O. Velazquez as Boy with Teddy Bear
- Thomas R. Nunan III as Pentagon Official
- John Galindez as MIG Pilot
- Lindsey Sutton as E.M.T.
- Alan Trudeau as E.M.T.
- Rafael Lopez Diaz as Short Indian Scientist
- Norman Grant as Delivery Room Doctor
- Krissy Korn as Referee

== Production ==
=== Development ===
Tim Story was initially announced as the film's director in 2007. The Losers was thought to be a notable departure from Story's previous work, as he spent considerable time directing the American superhero films Fantastic Four (2005) and Fantastic Four: Rise of the Silver Surfer (2007). An ardent fan of the war film genre, Story sought influences from the war drama Black Hawk Down (2001) and the television miniseries Band of Brothers (2001). "I was looking for a vehicle that would have that edge," he affirmed, "but I didn't want to lose my personality, which is a bit tongue-in-cheek, where the characters have a little fun with each other." Coinciding with Story's arrival, Peter Berg was declared as a producer for The Losers. Berg was originally responsible for conceiving the film's script—ultimately having intentions to direct the film—but later left the project to direct Hancock (2008). Alongside Akiva Goldsman and Kerry Foster, Berg collaborated with longtime partners Sarah Aubrey and John Cameron. Sylvain White replaced Story as director in October 2008. Prior to the revelation, White was developing an adaptation of Rōnin.

A native of Paris, France, White asserted that his fascination of The Losers became evident after drawing parallels to the graphic novels he read as a child. "What appealed to me about The Losers was that it wasn't the typical superhero-with-superpowers thing. It was based on real characters—realistic characters—and based in reality, like a lot of the European graphic novels that I had grown up reading." Jock and Andy Diggle, the creators of the Vertigo comics of the same name, worked closely with White creating for The Losers; the former in particular was sought after by White for help. "From the beginning, even when I was working on the screenplay, I had a really tight dialogue with them — even in trying to visualize some of the scenes. I would talk to Jock often, because he's obviously got an amazing eye, and they came down during production. I'm actually talking to them almost every day right now, talking to Jock in terms of design. We included some of his design work into the design of the movie. I'm not going to give it away, but it's certain little design elements that we use to introduce the characters or transition from one location to the next." The film adapts the first two volumes of the comic book, "Ante Up" and "Double Down" and tells the story in a more linear way than in the comic books. Elements of the story have been left out instead of trying to squeeze the whole story into one film and the director would like to tell the rest of the story if the film does well at the box office.

In February 2009, it was reported that Jeffrey Dean Morgan would headline the upcoming adaptation playing Clay. In March 2009, it was confirmed that Columbus Short will play Pooch, Idris Elba will play Roque and Zoe Saldaña will play Aisha, Chris Evans playing Jensen, and Óscar Jaenada playing Cougar. In August 2009, it was announced that Jason Patric will play Max.

The release date for The Losers was changed on two occasions; it was originally delayed to June 2010—as it roughly coincided with the release of Clash of the Titans (2010)—ultimately reverting to an April release. This occurrence was partially attributed to investment purposes as well as to accommodate reshoots for the film—although reshoots were not needed for the film. "So I think the marketing department decided, 'Let's maybe move to the June date,' but then the April date opened up again and they went back to it. I'm not quite sure how the science of these things work, that's not really my department and I trust the marketing at Warner Bros. to make the best decision for the movie."

=== Filming ===
Principal photography commenced over a period of four months from July to October 2009. Despite the diverse array of settings featured in the film—which included cities such as Miami, Dubai, Mumbai, and Los Angeles—most of principal photography transpired in Puerto Rico. White found its infrastructure and locales to be ideal and convenient, giving them the ability to "cheat" because they had "a variety of terrains within a relatively small distance". "It was staggering what we found when we came to Puerto Rico to scout," recalled Foster. "There is a city, obviously gorgeous beaches, a close approximation of a desert, and a rainforest that was ideal to double for Bolivia." Filming locations in the area include the Arecibo Observatory's tropical environment, which /Film's Peter Scrietta felt that producers used to their advantage.

Color was strongly emphasized in crafting the visuals of the film. Production designer Aaron Osbourne attempted to enhance the colour scheme of the comics, which he noticed that only two to three colours were used to convey the tone of each setting. "Every chapter of the comic books is a new environment distinguished by different colour palettes," explained White. "I really wanted to do that in the movie as well–where every time we are in a new city or country, the aesthetic of the film changes completely, so there is no homogeneous look. It's very eclectic." This meticulous approach was echoed by cinematographer Scott Kevan, who White collaborated with in breaking down the images of various scenes. "We charted the whole movie with certain colour schemes for each location and different shades as we moved from day to night."

== Marketing ==
Promotional artwork for the film was released at Comic-Con, the poster was drawn in the style of the comic book by series artist Jock, and was later recreated photographically with the cast from the film and used as the theatrical release poster.

A four-minute preview of the film was shown at WonderCon.

A special "double volume" collected edition graphic novel was released to tie in with the film adaptation collecting including the volumes Ante Up and Double Down. A second book to collect the rest of the series was also released.

== Release ==
In June 2009, Warner Bros. set a tentative release date of April 9, 2010, for the film. The release date was then pushed back to June 4, 2010, to avoid going up against Clash of the Titans also from Warner Bros. The trailer for the film was released online January 29, 2010, and was shown in theaters with Edge of Darkness. An official photo for the film was released online. The release date was subsequently moved up to April 23, 2010.

== Reception ==
=== Critical response ===
On Rotten Tomatoes, the film has an approval percentage of 47% based on 167 reviews and a rating of 5.20 out of 10. The critics consensus reads: "The Losers is loud, fast, and unrelentingly violent -- but it's also funny and well-acted, which will make all the difference for some action fans." On Metacritic, the film has a score of 44 out of 100 based on 32 critic reviews, meaning "Mixed or Average". Audiences polled by CinemaScore gave the film an average grade of "B" on an A+ to F scale.

Peter Debruge of Variety criticized the film as "the sort of pyro-heavy exercise parodied in Tropic Thunder". He noted that casting against type helps make the team more memorable but complained that despite the polished production, the film offers only a hollow "junk-food high". John Anderson described the film as a good idea pushed to excess, and with all "the freshness of last week's salad bar". Scott Tobias of The A.V. Club complained about the lack of "humility or self-deprecation" in the heroes despite their title. He noted how the film tries so strenuously to be cool and described the film as nothing more than "style for its own sake".

Phelim O'Neill of The Guardian gave the film 3 stars out of 5. He noted similarities to The A-Team and criticized the film for being full of action movie cliches. He praised the film for the lighter comedic touches, and described it as "big dumb fun" overall. His colleague Philip French of The Observer described the film as being in "A-Team territory" with the action sequences being well enough put together but that "it was all done far better in Walter Hill's Extreme Prejudice".

Director Quentin Tarantino offered a positive reaction to the film, calling it "dumb fun."

=== Box office ===
The film played in 2,936 theaters and earned $9,406,348 on its opening weekend at the box office at #4. The film went on to earn $23.5 million in the United States and more than $5 million internationally for a worldwide total of over $29 million. Added to this, it made over $8.2 million on DVD sales in the USA alone, giving it a minimum earning of $37.6 million.

== Home media ==
The film was released on DVD and Blu-ray on July 20, 2010.
