= Green Arrow: Year One =

2007 comic book series

- Cover to Green Arrow: Year One #1, art by Jock.

Publication information
- Publisher: DC Comics
- Schedule: Biweekly
- Format: Limited series
- Genre: Superhero
- Publication date: September - November 2007
- No. of issues: 6

Creative team
- Written by: Andy Diggle
- Artist: Jock

Collected editions
- Green Arrow: Year One: ISBN 1-4012-1687-0

Green Arrow: Year One is a 2007 Green Arrow limited series published by DC Comics. The series is written by Andy Diggle with art by Jock, who had previously worked together on The Losers.

== Plot summary ==
Oliver Queen is a frivolous playboy and a thrill-seeker. After yet another drunken party, he decides to embark on a sea voyage, only to be betrayed by his only friend and trusted bodyguard Hackett. After being thrown overboard, he washes up on an apparently deserted jungle island.

Oliver survives his new environment for months with a makeshift bow and arrows, gradually coming to realize that he is a natural-born bowman. Being stranded on the island teaches him to treasure the simple things in life that he had previously squandered, and for the first time in his life, he feels truly happy.

Things take a turn for the worse when he learns that the island is, in fact, inhabited. A woman who he calls China White has enslaved the island's inhabitants and forced them to grow opium and manufacture heroin. After a tussle with Hackett, her business associate, Oliver is seriously wounded; he is saved from certain death by Taiana, one of the island's natives. Her selfless act of kindness opens Oliver's eyes to the reality that he had taken his life and wealth for granted, and stepped over the underprivileged on his way to the top.

Oliver frees the slaves and takes down White's organization armed only with Howard Hill's bow, which White had held an auction for, and a dozen arrows. When the authorities arrive, Oliver downplays his role in the affair, sacrificing the credit of busting a major drug ring in order to protect the lives of Taiana's people.

To repay his debt to Taiana, Oliver makes it his life's calling to fight for the rights of the downtrodden. Believing that it is not his style to bask in the limelight anymore, he chooses to live a double life as a brash socialite by day and by night, a hero. Upon his return to Star City, he crafts a costume and takes the name Taiana gave him: Green Arrow.

== Collected editions ==
Green Arrow: Year One was first collected in hardcover in 2008 (ISBN 9781401216870) and later as a trade paperback (ISBN 9781401217433) in 2009.

== In other media ==
The limited series served as an inspiration for the regular flashback sequences featured in the live-action TV show, Arrow broadcast on The CW from 2012. Showrunner Marc Guggenheim acknowledged that an original character to the television series, John Diggle, portrayed by David Ramsey, was named in honor of the comic series author Andy Diggle: "We felt like we were drawing enough inspiration for Year One that we felt we should name a character after Andy [Diggle], and so we did". John Diggle's brother Andy Diggle was introduced into the series in season three, portrayed by Eugene Byrd.
