= Faker (comics) =

- Cover to Faker #1 (July 2007)

Publication information
- Publisher: Vertigo
- Schedule: Monthly
- Format: Limited series
- Publication date: September 2007 - February 2008
- No. of issues: 6

Creative team
- Created by: Mike Carey; Jock
- Written by: Mike Carey
- Artist: Jock
- Letterer: Clem Robins
- Colorist: Lee Loughridge
- Editor(s): Shelly Bond; Angela Rufino

Collected editions
- Faker: ISBN 1-4012-1663-3

Faker is a six-issue comic book limited series that started in July 2007 by Vertigo, written by Mike Carey, and with art by Jock.

== Plot ==
Minnesota college students Jessica, Yvonne, Marky and Sack are at a party when an ex-girlfriend of Marky's slips a bottle of "Angel's Kiss" into their drinks. Angel's Kiss turns out to be an experimental medium for liquid data storage. Shortly afterwards, a friend of the four students, Nick Philo, turns up in their dorm. After a bizarre series of events, all five come to realize that "Nick", though possessing a physical body, is not real at all, but is a creation of their minds under the influence of Angel's Kiss.

The five are then abducted by the United States government, the creators of Angel's Kiss, who are now extremely interested in its potential for weapons research as well as data storage. Jessie leads her friends on a breakout of the installation at which they are being held captive, but falls into an entire vat of Angel's Kiss in the process; she emerges transformed in some unknown manner. On the run in the open country, Marky and Yvonne are shot and killed by the soldiers pursuing them. Nick dives into a rural reservoir, and his body dissolves, apparently contaminating all the local drinking water with Angel's Kiss. Jessie ultimately escapes but, returning to her old life, finds herself constantly drinking tap water, in the hope of recreating at least part of the reality of Nick's existence.

== Collected editions ==
The series has been collected into a trade paperback:

- Faker (160 pages, April 2008, Titan Books, ISBN 1-84576-838-8, DC Comics, ISBN 1-4012-1663-3)
