= Jock (cartoonist) =

British comics artist

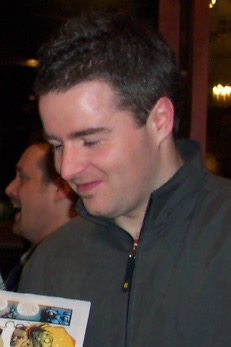
- Jock in 2003
- Born: Mark Simpson; 24 September 1972 (age 54) East Kilbride, Scotland
- Areas: Penciller, Inker
- Pseudonym: Jock
- Notable works: Judge Dredd; The Losers
- Awards: "Best Newcomer" National Comics Award (2001), Inkpot Award (2022)

Mark Simpson (born 24 September 1972), known by the pen name Jock, is a Scottish cartoonist, best known for his work in 2000 AD, The Losers, and more recently Batman and Wolverine. He is also known for Wytches by Image Comics.

== Career ==
=== Comics ===
Jock began his career at British comics magazine 2000 AD, on series including Judge Dredd and Lenny Zero, the latter with writer Andy Diggle.

It was with Diggle that he got his big break in the American comic book market at DC Comics and their Vertigo imprint, working on The Losers and Green Arrow: Year One. Also at Vertigo and with Mike Carey, another former 2000 AD writer, Jock worked on an issue of Hellblazer and the Faker limited series, returning the character John Constantine in the graphic novel Hellblazer: Pandemonium with Jamie Delano. Following his run on Green Arrow he got more work on main DC universe titles, in particular two storylines on Detective Comics, the first featuring Batwoman and the second Batman.

On 9 April 2011 Jock was one of 62 comics creators who appeared at the IGN stage at the Kapow! convention in London to set two Guinness World Records, the Fastest Production of a Comic Book, and Most Contributors to a Comic Book. With Guinness officials on hand to monitor their progress, writer Mark Millar began work at 9am scripting a 20-page black and white Superior comic book, with Jock and the other artists appearing on stage throughout the day to work on the pencils, inks, and lettering, including Dave Gibbons, Frank Quitely, John Romita Jr., Adi Granov, Doug Braithwaite, Ian Churchill, Olivier Coipel, Duncan Fegredo, Simon Furman, David Lafuente, John McCrea, Sean Phillips and Liam Sharp, who all drew a panel each, with regular Superior artist Leinil Yu creating the book's front cover. The book was completed in 11 hours, 19 minutes, and 38 seconds, and was published through Icon on 23 November 2011, with all royalties being donated to Yorkhill Children's Foundation.

=== Movie work ===
Jock has contributed concept paintings and key art to a number of film productions and promotional campaigns, including Hancock, Battleship, Children of Men, Dredd, Batman Begins and X-Men: Days of Future Past. He was the principal concept designer on Dredd. He continued his work with Dredd scriptwriter Alex Garland on Garland's next film, Ex Machina, working on the AI robot Ava. Simpson created concept art for Peter Berg's cancelled adaptation of Dune.

=== Poster art ===
Jock has produced a number of silk screen prints and poster art for Mondo, including The Divide, Zombi 2, The Last House on the Left, West of Memphis, The Dark Knight Rises, The Raid: Redemption, Dredd, Zero Dark Thirty, The Thing, Halloween, and Iron Man 3.

== Awards ==
=== Nominations ===
- 2006 Eisner Award for Best Cover Artist (for The Losers)
- 2012 Stan Lee Award for Best Artist (for Detective Comics)

=== Awards ===
- 2001 National Comics Award for Best New Talent (for "Judge Dredd" in 2000AD, tied with Frazer Irving, for "Necronauts" in 2000AD)
- 2012 Stan Lee Award for Best Ongoing Series (for Detective Comics, with Scott Snyder, Francesco Francavilla)
- MTV The 10 Best Movie Posters of 2010 (#8, for The Losers poster art)
- 2019 SXSW Excellence in Poster Design Winner for Daniel Isn't Real

== Bibliography ==
=== Comics ===
==== 2000 AD ====
- Pulp Sci-Fi: "Reapermen" (with Gordon Rennie, in #1170, 1999)
  - Judge Dredd:
    - "Shirley Temple of Doom" (with John Wagner, in #1193–1196, 2000)
    - "Crossing Ken Dodd" (with John Wagner, in #1214, 2000)
    - "Rampots" (with John Wagner, in #1231, 2001)
    - "Safe Hands" (with Gordon Rennie, in #1273, 2002)
    - "Tartan Terrors" (with Gordon Rennie, in #1540, 2007)
  - Tor Cyan (with John Tomlinson):
    - "Rahab" (in #1295, 2002)
    - "Phage" (in #1296, 2002)
    - "No Such Place" (in #1297–1299, 2002)
- Judge Dredd Megazine (Fleetway):
  - Judge Dredd (with John Wagner):
    - "Dead Ringer" (in vol. 3 No. 65, 2000)
    - "Ten Years" (in vol. 3 No. 70, 2000)
  - Lenny Zero (with Andy Diggle):
    - "Lenny Zero" (in vol. 3 No. 68, 2000)
    - "Dead Zero" (in vol. 4 #1–2, 2001)
    - "Wipeout" (in vol. 4 #14–15, 2002)

==== DC Comics/Vertigo ====
- Hellblazer:
  - "The Game of Cat and Mouse" (with Mike Carey, in No. 181, 2003)
  - Pandemonium (with Jamie Delano, graphic novel, 2010)
- The Losers #1–6, 9–12, 16–19, 23–25, 29–32 (with Andy Diggle, Vertigo, 2003–2006)
- Faker (with Mike Carey, Vertigo, 2007–2008)
- Green Arrow: Year One (with Andy Diggle, DC Comics, 2007)
- Detective Comics:
  - "Cutter" (with Greg Rucka, in #861–863, 2010)
  - "The Black Mirror" (with Scott Snyder, in #871–873, 2011)
  - "Hungry City" (with Scott Snyder, in #876–878, 2011)
  - "My Dark Architect" (with Scott Snyder, in No. 880, 2011)
  - "The Face in the Glass" (with Scott Snyder and Francesco Francavilla, in No. 881, 2011)
- Batman:
  - "A Simple Case" (with Scott Snyder and Brian Azzarello, in #44, 2015)
- "All-Star Batman":
  - "My Own Worst Enemy" (with Scott Snyder, in #1-5, 2016)
  - Cold to the Core (with Scott Snyder, in #6, 2017)
- The Batman Who Laughs #1–7 (with Scott Snyder, DC Comics, 2018–2019)
- Batman: One Dark Knight #1–3 (2022)
- Absolute Batman #15 (2025)

==== Marvel Comics ====
- Dark X-Men: The Beginning #3: "Get Mystique (Slight Return)" (with Jason Aaron, Marvel, 2009)
- Savage Wolverine (writer and artist, with Lee Loughridge, #9-11, 2013)

==== Other publishers ====
- Forty-Five: "Amy Turner" (with Andi Ewington and 44 other artists, graphic novel, Com.x, 2010)
- Immortals: Gods and Heroes: "The Hunt" (script and art, graphic novel, Archaia Studios, 2011)
- Snapshot #1–4 (with Andy Diggle, Image Comics, 2013)
- Wytches (with Scott Snyder, Image Comics, 2014)

==== DSTLRY ====
- Gone (Solo writer and artist, DSTLRY 2023)

=== Cover art ===
- 2000 AD #1203, 1227, 1236, 1254, 1258, 1260, 1266, 1274, 1304, 1318, 1335, 1397, 1450, 1503 (Fleetway/Rebellion Developments, 2000–2006)
- Judge Dredd Megazine vol. 3 No. 77 (Fleetway, 2001)
- Judge Dredd Megazine vol. 4 No. 4, 11 (Fleetway, 2001–2002)
- Judge Dredd vs. Aliens: Incubus No. 4 (Dark Horse, 2003)
- 2000 AD Extreme Edition No. 1 (Rebellion, 2003)
- King James No. 1 (DC Comics, 2004)
- The Losers #7–8, 13–15, 20–22, 26–28 (Vertigo, 2004–2005)
- Batman: Legends of the Dark Knight #177–178 (DC Comics, 2004)
- Detective Comics #797–800, 809–810, 859, 871–881 (DC Comics, 2004–2012)
- Catwoman No. 43 (DC Comics, 2005)
- Batman #642–650, Annual No. 25 (DC Comics, 2005–2006)
- Nightwing #118–124 (DC Comics, 2006)
- Swamp Thing No. 26 (Vertigo, 2006)
- Rush City (DC Comics, 2006–2007)
- Scalped #1–11, 13–17, 21–60 (Vertigo, 2007–2012)
- Push No. 1 (Wildstorm, 2009)
- Thunderbolts No. 127 (Marvel, 2009)
- Die Hard: Year One #1–4 (Boom! Studios, 2009)
- Batman Confidential No. 33 (DC Comics, 2009)
- Deadlocke No. 1 (Dark Horse, 2009)
- Greek Street #3–6 (Vertigo, 2009)
- Azrael #1–3 (DC Comics, 2009–2010)
- Freddy vs. Jason vs. Ash: The Nightmare Warriors #5–6 (Wildstorm, 2009–2010)
- Driver (Wildstorm, 2010)
- Daredevil No. 511 (Marvel, 2011)
- Daredevil: Reborn (Marvel, 2011)
- Incredible Hulks No. 626 (Marvel, 2011)
- Pigs No. 1 (Image, 2011)
- Marvel Universe vs. Wolverine No. 3 (Marvel, 2011)
- Wolverine MAX #1–15 (Marvel, 2012)
- Scalped No. 60 (Vertigo, 2012)
- American Vampire No. 30 (Vertigo, 2012)
- Uncanny No. 1 Variant (Dynamite, 2013)
- Jupiter's Legacy No. 2 Variant (Image, 2013)
- Swamp Thing No. 21 (DC Comics, 2013)
- Superman Unchained No. 8 (DC Comics, 2014)
- Grayson No. 6 (DC Comics, 2015)
- Suiciders No. 1 (DC Comics, 2015)
- Batman/Superman No. 21 (DC Comics, 2015)
- Batman:Europa No. 4 (DC Comics, 2016)
- Superman:American Alien No. 7 (DC Comics, 2016)
- Batman/The Shadow No. 6 (DC Comics, 2017)
- Lucifer No. 1 (Vertigo, 2018)
- Batman:Last Knight on Earth No. 1 (DC Comics, 2019)
- Batman Black and White No. 2 (DC Comics, 2021)
- Venom No. 200 (Marvel, 2021)

=== Tabletop Games ===
- SLA Industries - Nightfall Games (1999)
