= Hellblazer: Pandemonium =

John Constantine, Hellblazer: Pandemonium
- Date: February 10, 2010
- Main characters: John Constantine
- Series: Hellblazer
- Page count: 128 pages
- Publisher: Vertigo

Creative team
- Writers: Jamie Delano
- Artists: Jock
- Letterers: Clem Robins
- Colourists: Jock
- Editors: Pornsak Pichetshote; Casey Seijas; Karen Berger

Original publication
- Date of publication: February 10, 2010
- ISBN: 1-4012-2035-5

Hellblazer: Pandemonium is an original graphic novel featuring the DC Comics character John Constantine, released February 10, 2010 by the DC's Vertigo imprint. The book is intended to mark the 25th anniversary of the first appearance of Constantine in the pages of Swamp Thing and was written by Jamie Delano, the original writer for the character's solo series Hellblazer, with art by Jock.

== Publication history ==
The book has been delayed several times from the originally slated publication date of sometime in 2008. It was eventually released as a hardcover graphic novel by Vertigo in February 2010 (ISBN 1-4012-2035-5) and in the UK by Titan Books in March 2010 (ISBN 1845768655), and subsequently released in paperback by Vertigo in March 2011 (ISBN 1401220398).

== Story ==
The graphic novel is a self-contained story, venturing into the political ground that Jamie Delano is well known for. The story starts with a scene in Iraq, where a small town was bombed. The U.S. Army manages to detain a man said to be responsible. While being interrogated, the man unleashes a supernatural power that kills the soldiers and destroys the camp.

In London, a chance encounter with a young Muslim girl leads a curious Constantine to the British Museum. The museum is suddenly bombed but Constantine and the girl manage to escape. Constantine invites the girl to his home when he suspects she is responsible. However, when they arrive, Constantine is taken by the authorities, having been framed for the bombing. Constantine is later handed over to MI6, where they blackmail him to find the real culprit of the bombing, and send him to Iraq to investigate a supernatural entity plaguing the area. Having no choice, Constantine agrees.

While in Iraq, the Muslim girl shows up again, introducing herself to a surprised Constantine as Aseera Al-Aswari, and is an agent of MI6. She and Constantine drive into an army camp to discuss the events. While on the road, Constantine deduces that the place used to be an ancient city, named Kutha, as well as a Sumerian temple. Aseera tells him he's right, but also that the no one's been in the place for a long time since the war. They finally arrive in the installation and settle down. As night comes, under the cover of darkness, John uses magic to sneak out. He travels to Kutha, where he discovers the city is actually a den of demons, before he is detained by Aseera.

The next day, John and Aseera visit the mysterious detainee locked away. As John examines him, the detainee turns out to be inhuman. In fact, John deduces that the detainee is a djinn. The camp was suddenly attacked by insurgents, and John is able to trap the spirit inside a bottle. The installation was quickly overrun, but John, Aseera, and the djinn escape. They are soon stranded in the middle of the desert with no one to contact. Constantine explains to Aseera that Kutha is actually a city whose people worshiped a god named Nergal. Nergal also happens to be one of Constantine's longtime adversaries. John later invites Aseera to sleep with him when night comes. The next morning, insurgents appear and kidnap both of them. They are later handed over to Nergal.

Nergal welcomes John to Hell, where he begins a monologue explaining that he was collecting the souls of the dead to trap them in Hell, while the djinns were made as workers. Seeing that Nergal is running a casino in Hell, John challenges Nergal to a game of poker for the souls. Nergal and his confidants agree, but if John loses he will find himself "cleaning Nergal's ass with his tongue" for eternity. John cheats his way to victory, and Nergal is forced to free all the souls along with John and Aseera.

With his mission completed, John returns to London for his end of the bargain. In the MI6 headquarters he releases the djinn and intimidates the MI6 officials to free Aseera in Iraq and give her a new life of luxury. Frightened, the officials agree.

== Reception ==
Reviews were positive. Comic Book Resources describes it as a "fun easter egg", saying "a good, solid John Constantine book that looks great. I hoped for a bit more, but if you’re just looking for a decent supernatural tale starring Mr. Constantine, you might want to give this a look.'
