= Guy Ritchie's Gamekeeper =

Comic book series by Guy Ritchie

- Cover to issue #1 of Guy Ritchie's Gamekeeper (March 2007).

Publication information
- Publisher: Virgin Comics
- Format: Ongoing series
- Publication date: March 2007–July 2008

Creative team
- Created by: Guy Ritchie
- Written by: Guy Ritchie, Andy Diggle, Jeff Parker
- Artist(s): Mukesh Singh, Ron Randall, Ron Chan

Guy Ritchie's Gamekeeper is a comic book series from Virgin Comics and film director Guy Ritchie.

== Credits ==
Guy Ritchie's Gamekeeper was created by Guy Ritchie, and the first volume was written by Andy Diggle, with art and color by Mukesh Singh.

The second volume was written by Jeff Parker and illustrated by Ron Randall and Ron Chan, with covers by Singh.

== Story ==
The man known only as Brock lives a quiet existence as a gamekeeper on a secluded Scottish estate. The tranquillity is disrupted when Russian paramilitary mercenaries storm the estate and kill Jonah Morgan, Brock's friend and owner of the estate. To avenge Jonah's death and protect a secret equation, Brock must turn predator and journey deep into an unfamiliar, urban underworld. He is plagued by a dark past and his son's death throughout his journey.

== Publications ==
Issue #1 was released in March 2007. The trade paperback, entitled Guy Ritchie's Gamekeeper: Tooth and Claw, which includes issues #1–5, was released in October 2007.

== Reception ==
The series has received an overall favorable critical reception. A review of issue #1 by Wizard Entertainment praised the artwork and the story for its characterizations and plot twists. Issue #1 received a B+ by Variety blog Bags and Boards, which commended its originality and artwork.

== Adaptation ==
Warner Brothers acquired the film rights to the series for Silver Pictures to produce and Ritchie to direct.
