= Daredevil: Reborn =

Comic book

- Daredevil: Reborn #4 (2011); Cover art by Jock

Publication information
- Publisher: Marvel Comics
- Schedule: Monthly
- Format: Limited series
- Genre: Superhero
- Publication date: 2011
- No. of issues: 4

Creative team
- Written by: Andy Diggle; Antony Johnston
- Artist: Davide Gianfelice
- Colorist: Matt Hollingsworth

Collected editions
- Hardcover: ISBN 978-0-7851-5132-6
- Softcover: ISBN 078515132X

Daredevil: Reborn is a four-issue comic book limited series published by Marvel Comics. Following the events of Shadowland, Matt Murdock has left Hell's Kitchen behind. The story involves Matt entering Mexico, where he deals with a small town's incident. The series was released in 2011 written by Andy Diggle.

== Plot ==
While walking away from New York, Matt arrives at a diner outside a small Mexican town, where he helps a young blind boy fend off bullies, and gives him advice about how to cope with his disability, only to be turned away by the hostile local police. Unable to overcome his curiosity, Matt follows them and discovers a mass grave outside the city, along with a large amount of secret weapons. He discovers that the corrupt police are involved in an illegal trade with a drug smuggler named Calavera. Despite Calavera's mysterious telepathic ability to draw out and exploit Murdock's sins, the ordeal leaves Matt reassured in himself and his responsibilities, and he begins preparations to return to New York and rebuild his legal and vigilante careers.
