= The Losers (Vertigo) =

Comic book by Andy Diggle

- Cover of The Losers #1 (August 2003), art by Jock.

Publication information
- Publisher: Vertigo
- Schedule: Monthly
- Format: Ongoing series
- Genre: Techno-thriller
- Publication date: August 2003 – March 2006
- No. of issues: 32
- Main character(s): Clay; Roque; Jensen; Cougar; Pooch; Aisha

Creative team
- Created by: Andy Diggle; Jock
- Written by: Andy Diggle
- Artist(s): Jock; Shawn Martinbrough; Nick Dragotta; Alé Garza; Ben Oliver
- Letterer: Clem Robins
- Colorist: Lee Loughridge
- Editor(s): Will Dennis; Zachary Rau

Collected editions
- Ante Up: ISBN 1-4012-0198-9
- Double Down: ISBN 1-40120-348-5
- Trifecta: ISBN 1-40120-489-9
- Close Quarters: ISBN 1-40120-719-7
- Endgame: ISBN 1-40121-004-X
- Book One: ISBN 1-4012-2733-3
- Book Two: ISBN 1-4012-2923-9

The Losers is a comic book series written by Andy Diggle and illustrated by Jock, and published by the Vertigo imprint of DC Comics. It ran for 32 issues from August 2003 to March 2006.

The idea was loosely based on the original The Losers for DC Comics, a group of World War II soldiers, although Diggle maintains he has never read a single issue of the original series.

The series was adapted into a film of the same name that was released in 2010.

== Publication history ==
Andy Diggle has talked about the development of the concept, which developed from conversations with editor Will Dennis about doing an original title at Vertigo:

I had to show that I could deliver the goods, first. So we talked about revamping an old DC character of some sort. I wanted to write a contemporary, crime-y, thriller-y—something in that genre. We started trying to think of a character we could revamp for Vertigo. I thought that 'Johnny Double' did exactly that. He was some character from 'Showcase' or something like that. I'd never heard of him, but Azzarello just plucked him from obscurity and revamped him in his cracking little miniseries. That was the model we were thinking of, find something as obscure as that... I was looking at all the online encyclopedias and stuff but we couldn't find anything that worked. One day, Will rang me up and said, 'Hey, have you ever heard of "The Losers"?' And I said, 'Well, actually no, but it's a great title. I could do something with a title like that'. I went straight onto Wikipedia and read up on who the Losers were and all that, but I've still never read any of the original issues. I made it a point not to.

He originally thought about returning to the original and doing a war comic:

[B]ut then it occurred to me—Garth Ennis was already doing War Stories at Vertigo, which already had the World War II angle covered. Howard Chaykin and David Tischman were doing American Century, which was a '50s crime book at Vertigo. Both those bases were already covered, so to hell with it, let's just throw away the original concept, keep the title and come up with something completely new from scratch. The only thing I kept from my original idea was what if it was about a bunch of soldiers who were dead but it turns out they're not really dead, they're just lying low for some reason. It was originally pitched as a four-issue miniseries. It was going to be much more a military crime caper in the tone of Three Kings or Kelly's Heroes. It went through a drastic mutation.

The ongoing monthly comic concluded in 2006 after 32 issues, but was never cancelled. According to Diggle, "everyone always thinks it got cancelled—it was always intended to be two or three years long".

== Plot ==
The Losers' reimagining was set against events surrounding and including the War on Terror. Originally a Special Forces team integrated with the Central Intelligence Agency. In the 1990s, the Losers were betrayed by their handler, Max, and left for dead following the conclusion of their operation. Eager for revenge and the opportunity to remove their names from a secret CIA death list, the Losers regroup and conduct covert operations against the CIA and its interests, uncovering startling operations spearheaded by the enigmatic Max, whose influence within the CIA and U.S. government is unparalleled.

== Characters ==
- Lieutenant Colonel Franklin Clay is the leader, easily identified by a consistent use of black suits without ties. A meticulous planner, initiative-taker and an excellent leader, Clay harbors the largest grudge against Max, at times appearing visibly angry at the mere mention of his name. He is possibly the grandson of Sarge Clay from the original Losers comic book series, as he told his old commanding general: "My grandfather died fighting an Axis that was 'just following orders'".
- Captain William Roque is the second-in-command, easily identified by the large, vertical scar down the right side of his face and icy demeanor. His ruthless thirst for money motivates a majority of his actions, including the serial betrayal of the Losers and many of his underlings. He is known for having a collection of daggers and knives, which he fights with when not using a gun.
- Captain Jake Jensen is the hacker, characterized by his spiky blonde hair, glasses and a conspicuous goatee on his chin. He is known for his motormouth that often gets him into trouble and provides for a variety of conversational tangents. He is able to crack all but the most complex encryption algorithms with ease, and is highly skilled in using most computer and communications systems.
- Sergeant Carlos "Cougar" Alvarez is the sniper, identified by his cowboy hat and haunted demeanor. He is morose and laconic as a result of a traumatic combat incident in Afghanistan.
- Sergeant Linwood "Pooch" Porteous is the pilot, identifiable by his shaved head and laid-back appearance, known to operate any ground, air or sea vehicle with ease. Despite his involvement with the CIA and the Special Forces, he is married with children. He is occasionally mocked by the other Losers, especially Jensen, for referring to himself in the third person.
- Aisha Al-Fadhil is the loose cannon, identified by her eyebrow piercing and tied-back hair. She partners with the Losers in light of their common goal of killing Max. She is skilled in all combat skills, with particular emphasis on melee and reconnaissance, stemming from a harsh upbringing in Afghanistan and Pakistan, primarily fighting as a child against Soviet soldiers during the Soviet–Afghan War. She is a cold-blooded killer who prefers to leave corpses rather than survivors when she engages the enemy.

== Collected editions ==
The complete run has been collected into a series of trade paperbacks. All stories are written by Andy Diggle, with Jock on the majority of art duties:

- Ante Up (collects #1–6, 158 pages, 2004, ISBN 1-4012-0198-9)
- Double Down (with Shawn Martinbrough, collects #7–12, 144 pages, 2004, ISBN 1-4012-0348-5)
- Trifecta (with Nick Dragotta and Alé Garza, collects #13–19, 168 pages, 2005, ISBN 1-4012-0489-9)
- Close Quarters (with Ben Oliver, collects #20–25, 144 pages, 2006, ISBN 1-4012-0719-7)
- Endgame (with Colin Wilson, collects #26–32, 168 pages, September 2006, ISBN 1-4012-1004-X)

In 2010, a "double volume", including both Ante Up and Double Down, was released to tie in with the film adaptation and a second book to collect the rest of the series:

- Book 1 (collects #1–12, 304 pages, ISBN 1-4012-2733-3)
- Book 2 (collects #13–32, 480 pages, ISBN 1-4012-2923-9)

== Reception ==
In the week after the film's release, The Losers: Book 1 topped the New York Times paperback graphic books list.

== Awards ==
In 2004, the series won the Eagle Award for "Favourite New Comicbook" and was nominated for the "Best New Series" Eisner Award. In 2006, Jock was nominated for the "Best Cover Artist" Eisner Award, for The Losers.

== Film adaptation ==
A live-action adaptation of The Losers was released on April 23, 2010. The film was developed by Warner Bros. Pictures and Dark Castle Entertainment. The Losers was directed by Sylvain White, with a screenplay by Peter Berg and James Vanderbilt. Tim Story was considered for directing. The actors starring in the film are Jeffrey Dean Morgan, Zoe Saldaña, Chris Evans, Idris Elba, Columbus Short and Jason Patric.
