= Andy Diggle =

British comic book writer (born 1971)

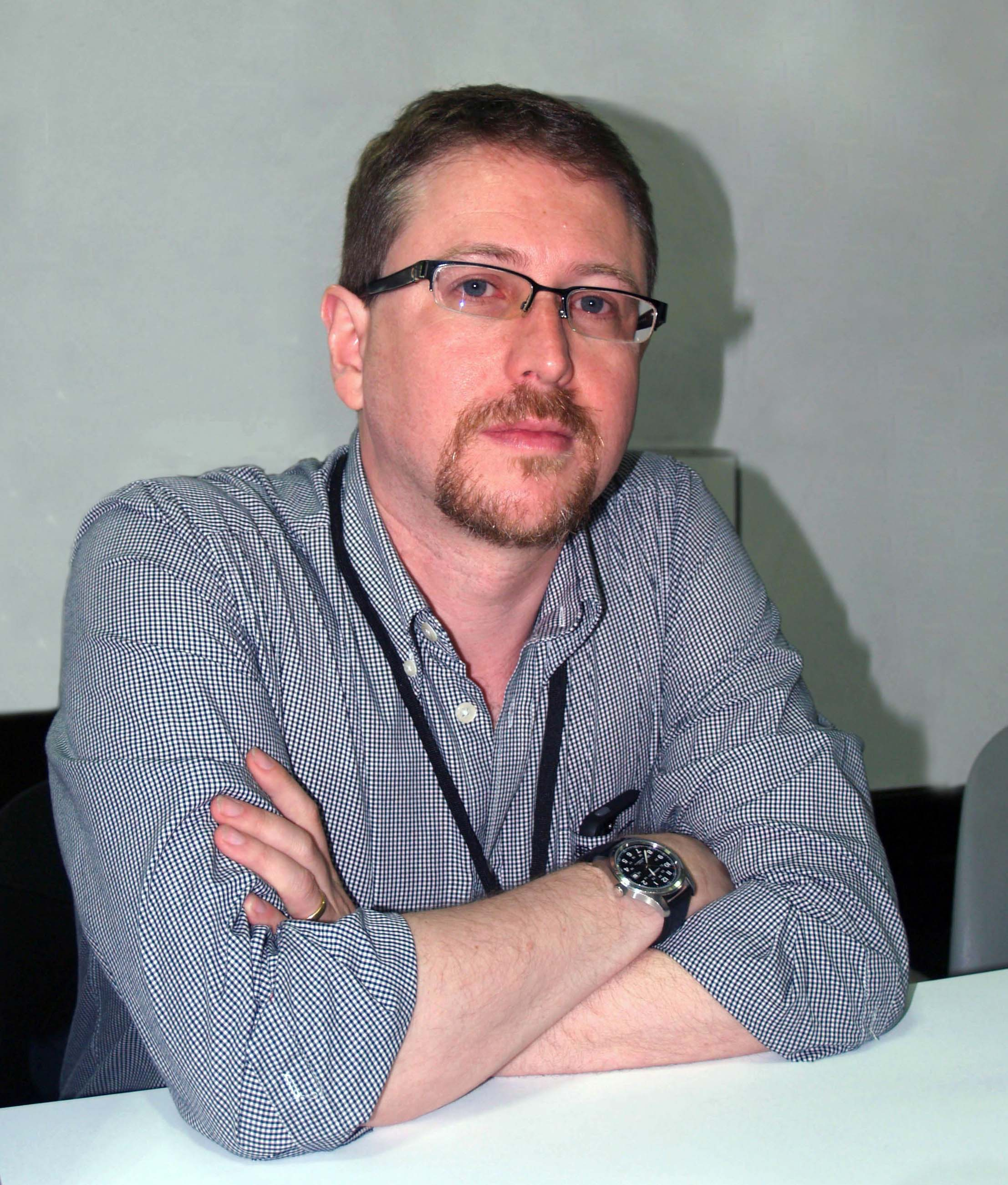
- Diggle at Special Edition NYC
- Born: 22 February 1971 (age 55) London, England
- Areas: Writer, Editor
- Notable works: The Losers; Hellblazer; Green Arrow: Year One; Thunderbolts; Daredevil; Shadowland
- Awards: "Favourite Comics Editor" Eagle Award (2000) "Best New Talent" National Comics Award (2003)

Andrew Diggle is a British comic book writer and former editor of the weekly anthology series 2000 AD. He is best known for his work on Adam Strange and Green Arrow for DC Comics as well as his creator-owned series The Losers and a run on Hellblazer for DC's Vertigo imprint, and for his stints on Thunderbolts and Daredevil at Marvel. Other credits include Gamekeeper for Virgin Comics, written by Diggle on the basis of a concept created by Guy Ritchie, a three-year run on Robert Kirkman's Thief of Thieves at Image, several short arcs written for IDW Publishing's Doctor Who series and two James Bond mini-series for Dynamite.

== Early life ==
Diggle was born in London, England. He became a regular reader of 2000 AD at the age of ten and started reading American comics after picking up an issue of Swamp Thing written by Alan Moore. Diggle graduated from De Montfort University with a degree in media studies, where he later returned to teach a part-time module on comics. For a few years, he worked as an administrator at University College London's Department of Town Planning while maintaining his own comics webzine.

== Career ==
Diggle began his career in comics as an assistant editor on Judge Dredd Megazine in 1997 and, after brief stints as the editor of Megazine and Sonic the Comic, took over the editorial duties of 2000 AD in 2000. Staying with the magazine for two years, Diggle has been credited (most frequently by David Bishop, who originally hired him for Judge Dredd Megazine) for spearheading a return to the "old school" values of 2000 AD. In 2001, Diggle won the Eagle Award in the "Favourite Editor" category. Around the same time, he began contributing to 2000 AD and Judge Dredd Megazine as a writer, creating Snow/Tiger with artist Andy Clarke and the Judge Dredd spin-off Lenny Zero in the first of numerous collaborations with artist Jock, and co-writing the crossover between Judge Dredd and the Aliens franchise with veteran 2000 AD creator John Wagner. In 2002, Diggle left his editorial position to become a full-time writer.

In 2003, Diggle entered the American comic book industry with a Hellblazer spin-off mini-series Lady Constantine for DC Comics' Vertigo imprint. That same year, Diggle and Jock both signed an exclusive 2-year contract with DC and launched the Eagle Award-winning and Eisner Award-nominated series The Losers that was later adapted into a feature film of the same name. In 2004, Diggle wrote the first six issues of a relaunched Swamp Thing ongoing series at Vertigo and made his DC Universe debut with an 8-issue limited series Adam Strange, following up with a creator-owned series Silent Dragon, drawn by Leinil Francis Yu and published via DC's Wildstorm imprint. In 2007, Diggle wrote the inaugural arc for Batman Confidential, an ongoing series set in the early years of Batman's crime-fighting career, reteamed with Jock for Green Arrow: Year One, a mini-series updating the origin of Green Arrow, and took over the writing duties of Vertigo's longest-running ongoing series Hellblazer.

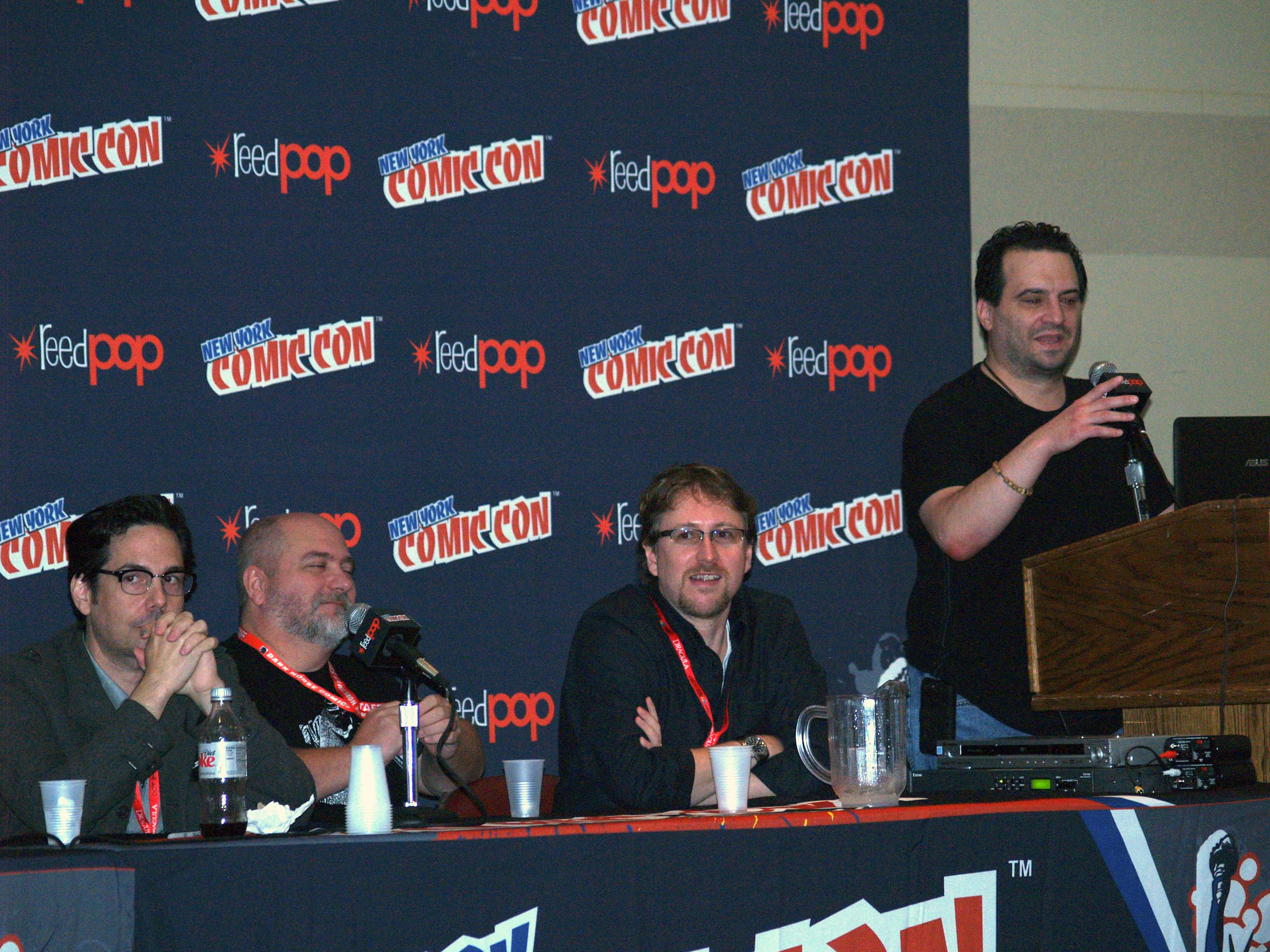
Diggle, third from left, on a Dynamite panel at the 2013 New York Comic Con. To Diggle's left are Dennis Calero and Matt Wagner.

Outside of DC, Diggle wrote Gamekeeper for Virgin Comics, based on a concept by Guy Ritchie, and the webcomic prequel to the Bionic Commando video game after having been hired to script a playable test level during the game's development.

In 2009, Diggle became the writer of Marvel's Thunderbolts, seeing the titular team through the company-wide storyline "Dark Reign" and a crossover with Deadpool. As part of "Dark Reign", Diggle also penned the 5-issue miniseries featuring the villain character Bullseye in the guise of the Avenger Hawkeye. In early 2009, Diggle signed an exclusive contract with Marvel and became the writer of Daredevil following the departure of Ed Brubaker. Diggle's storyline, which began in the Dark Reign: The List—Daredevil one-shot and continued with issue #501 of Daredevil, was initially planned to be told in the ongoing series, but Marvel offered to expand it into a small-scale crossover event for the company's "street-level" characters. The crossover event, titled "Shadowland", ran for three months, with Diggle writing the core 5-issue mini-series and co-writing the tie-in storyline in Daredevil with Antony Johnston. Diggle followed up on "Shadowland" with a 4-issue epilogue mini-series Daredevil: Reborn, drawn by Davide Gianfelice, with whom he subsequently reunited for the western mini-series Six Guns, his last work for Marvel to date.

2010 saw the release of Diggle's first work in the graphic novel format, Rat Catcher, published as part of Vertigo's then-recently launched line of crime books. The following year, he was hired to develop a Volkswagen Scirocco promotional campaign for the Chinese market. In 2012, Diggle returned to British comics with the first fully creator-owned collaboration between himself and Jock, Snapshot, originally serialized in Judge Dredd Megazine and subsequently reprinted for the American market, and a new installment of Lenny Zero, illustrated by Ben Willsher. That same year, he became the "series architect" for IDW Publishing's Doctor Who featuring the adventures of the Eleventh Doctor and joined the "writer's room" of Robert Kirkman's Thief of Thieves series at Image. Later in the year, Diggle and artist Tony Daniel were announced as the new creative team for The New 52 iteration of Action Comics following the departure of writer Grant Morrison and artist Rags Morales. Discussing his plans for the series, Diggle stated that he wanted to put "action" back into Action Comics and bring the character of Superman closer to the "wholesome Christopher Reeve version" as opposed to the more aggressive, hot-headed version introduced during The New 52 initiative. Diggle announced his exit from the title shortly thereafter, one month before the release of his first issue, citing "professional reasons", with Tony Daniel taking over the writing duties.

In 2013, Diggle began writing for Dynamite, starting with the paranormal crime series Uncanny with artist Aaron Campbell. Later in the year, Diggle announced his second creator-owned title at Dynamite, Control, to be drawn by Ben Oliver. The series, described as a "hard-hitting crime comic", was eventually released in 2016 with Oliver-drawn covers and interior art by Andrea Mutti. In addition to his creator-owned work, Diggle has also made several contributions to Dynamite's line of James Bond comics, starting with the 6-issue mini-series James Bond: Hammerhead, illustrated by Luca Casalanguida. In 2018, Diggle penned a one-off tale for DC Comics' Green Lanterns series and launched a new volume of Shadowman at Valiant.

== Personal life ==
Diggle is married to Angela Cruickshank, with whom he co-wrote the crime mini-series Control.

The character of John Diggle, created for The CW series Arrow and later introduced to comics, was named after Andy Diggle in acknowledgement of the influence of Green Arrow: Year One on the TV series' tone and writing. The series' fourth season would later introduce the character of Andy Diggle as John's younger brother.

== Bibliography ==
=== UK publishers ===
==== Work as editor ====
- Judge Dredd Megazine (Fleetway):
  - Judge Dredd Megazine vol. 3 #35–49 (as assistant editor, 1997–1999)
  - Judge Dredd Megazine vol. 3 #50–59, 69–73 (as commissioning editor, 1999–2001)
  - Judge Dredd Megazine vol. 3 #60–68 (as editor, 1999–2000)
- Batman/Judge Dredd: Die Laughing #1–2 (as assistant editor, DC Comics/Fleetway, 1998)
- The Best of 2000 AD Special Edition vol. 2 #1–2 (as reprint editor, Fleetway, 1999–2000)
- Sonic the Comic #169–184 (as editor, Egmont, 1999–2000)
- 2000 AD #1200–1273 (as editor, Fleetway/Rebellion, 2000–2002)

==== Work as writer ====
- Daily Star: "Robomania" (with Ron Smith, episodes #3732–3773 of the daily newspaper strip featuring Judge Dredd, published by Reach plc from March 7 to April 14, 1998)
- Judge Dredd Megazine (anthology, Fleetway/Rebellion):
  - Lenny Zero (with Jock, in vol. 3 #68 and vol. 4 #1–2 + 14–15, 2000–2002) collected in Mega-City Undercover Volume 1 (tpb, 160 pages, 2008, ISBN 1-905437-52-8)
  - Snapshot (with Jock, in #322–330, 2012)
    - Image reprinted the serial for the American market as a 4-issue limited series titled Snapshot (2013)
    - The Image series was subsequently collected as Snapshot (tpb, 104 pages, 2013, ISBN 1-60706-842-7)
- 2000 AD (anthology, Fleetway/Rebellion):
  - Tharg the Mighty: "A Night 2 Remember" (with Jock, one page in 2000 AD's 25th anniversary strip featuring a Judge Anderson cameo, in #1280, 2002)
  - Judge Dredd vs. Aliens: "Incubus" (co-written by Diggle and John Wagner, art by Henry Flint, in Prog 2003 and #1322–1335, 2002–2003)
    - The serial was published in the American market as a 4-issue monthly limited series titled Judge Dredd vs. Aliens: Incubus (Dark Horse, 2003)
    - Collected in the UK by Rebellion as Judge Dredd vs. Aliens: Incubus (hc, 104 pages, 2003, ISBN 1-904265-10-3; tpb, 2007, ISBN 1-905437-14-5)
    - Collected in the US by Dark Horse as Judge Dredd vs. Aliens: Incubus (tpb, 104 pages, 2004, ISBN 1-56971-983-7)
  - Snow/Tiger: "Pax Americana" (with Andy Clarke, in #1336–1342, 2003)
  - Tharg's Future Shocks: "Red Moon" (with Kev Walker, in #1398, 2004)
  - What If...?: "Rogue Trooper" (with Colin Wilson, in #1771, 2012) collected in Rogue Trooper: Tales of Nu-Earth Volume 4 (tpb, 288 pages, 2014, ISBN 1-78108-230-8)
  - Lenny Zero: "Zero's 7" (with Ben Willsher, in #1792–1799, 2012) collected in Mega-City Undercover Volume 3 (tpb, 112 pages, 2016, ISBN 1-78108-458-0)

=== DC Comics ===
- Hellblazer Special: Lady Constantine #1–4 (with Goran Sudžuka, Vertigo, 2003) collected as Hellblazer: Lady Constantine (tpb, 96 pages, 2006, ISBN 1-4012-0942-4)
- The Losers (with Jock, Shawn Martinbrough (#7–8), Nick Dragotta (#13–14), Alé Garza (#15), Ben Oliver (#20–22) and Colin Wilson (#26–28), Vertigo, 2003–2006) collected as:
  - Book One (collects #1–12, tpb, 304 pages, 2010, ISBN 1-4012-2733-3)
  - Book Two (collects #13–32, tpb, 480 pages, 2010, ISBN 1-4012-2923-9)
- Swamp Thing vol. 4 #1–6 (with Enrique Breccia, Vertigo, 2004) collected as Swamp Thing: Bad Seed (tpb, 144 pages, 2005, ISBN 1-4012-0421-X)
- Adam Strange vol. 2 #1–8 (with Pasqual Ferry, 2004–2005)
  - Collected as Adam Strange: Planet Heist (tpb, 192 pages, 2005, ISBN 1-4012-0727-8)
  - Collected in Adam Strange: Between Two Worlds (hc, 400 pages, 2023, ISBN 1-7795-2146-4)
- Silent Dragon #1–6 (with Leinil Francis Yu, Wildstorm, 2005–2006) collected as Silent Dragon (tpb, 144 pages, 2006, ISBN 1-4012-1104-6)
- Batman Confidential #1–6 (with Whilce Portacio, 2007) collected as Batman: Rules of Engagement (hc, 160 pages, 2007, ISBN 1-4012-1481-9; tpb, 2008, ISBN 1-4012-1706-0)
- Hellblazer (with Leonardo Manco, Danijel Žeželj (#238) and Giuseppe Camuncoli (#243–244), Vertigo, 2007–2008) collected as:
  - John Constantine, Hellblazer Volume 20 (includes #230–238, tpb, 328 pages, 2019, ISBN 1-4012-8569-4)
  - John Constantine, Hellblazer Volume 21 (includes #239–244, 247–249 and Hellblazer Special: Lady Constantine #1–4, tpb, 352 pages, 2019, ISBN 1-4012-9212-7)
- Green Arrow: Year One #1–6 (with Jock, 2007) collected as Green Arrow: Year One (hc, 160 pages, 2008, ISBN 1-4012-1687-0; tpb, 2009, ISBN 1-4012-1743-5)
- Vertigo Crime: Rat Catcher (with Víctor Ibáñez, graphic novel, hc, 192 pages, 2010, ISBN 1-4012-1158-5; sc, 2012, ISBN 1-4012-3063-6)
- Mystery in Space: "Transmission" (with Davide Gianfelice, anthology one-shot, Vertigo, 2012) collected in Strange Adventures (tpb, 160 pages, 2014, ISBN 1-4012-4393-2)
- Superman: Action Comics — Hybrid (hc, 200 pages, 2014, ISBN 1-4012-4632-X; tpb, 2014, ISBN 1-4012-5077-7) includes:
  - Young Romance: A New 52 Valentine's Day Special: "Truth or Dare" (with Robson Rocha, anthology, 2013)
  - Action Comics vol. 2 #19: "Hybrid, Part One" (with Tony Daniel, 2013)
    - Despite planning a longer run on the series, Diggle left the title one month before the publication of issue #19.
    - Diggle is also credited as a co-writer in issue #20 and a co-plotter in issue #21, with both issues scripted by Tony Daniel and collected in this volume.
- Green Lanterns Annual #1: "The Lost Lantern" (with Mike Perkins, 2018) collected in Green Lanterns: Superhuman Trafficking (tpb, 136 pages, 2018, ISBN 1-4012-8454-X)
- Batman: Legends of Gotham (with Karl Mostert, one-shot, 2023)
- Batman: Gotham by Gaslight (with Leandro Fernández, Elseworlds):
  - Batman: Gotham by Gaslight — The Kryptonian Age #1–6 (2024–2025) collected as Batman: Gotham by Gaslight — The Kryptonian Age (hc, 208 pages, 2025, ISBN 1-7995-0096-9; tpb, 2026, ISBN 1-7995-0945-1)
  - Batman: Gotham by Gaslight — A League for Justice #1–6 (2025–2026) collected as Batman: Gotham by Gaslight — A League for Justice (hc, 208 pages, 2026, ISBN 1-7995-0262-7; tpb, 2027, ISBN 1-7995-1614-8)

=== Marvel Comics ===
- The Punisher: Silent Night (with Kyle Hotz, one-shot, Marvel Knights, 2006) collected in Punisher: Very Special Holidays (tpb, 120 pages, 2006, ISBN 0-7851-2220-6)
- Thunderbolts (with Roberto de la Torre, Carlos Magno (#129), Bong Dazo (#130–131), Miguel Sepulveda (#133–135) and Pop Mhan (#136), 2009) collected as:
  - Burning Down the House (collects #126–129 and 132, hc, 112 pages, 2009, ISBN 0-7851-3152-3; tpb, 2009, ISBN 0-7851-3166-3)
  - Dark Reign: Deadpool/Thunderbolts (includes #130–131, tpb, 96 pages, 2009, ISBN 0-7851-4090-5)
  - Widowmaker (includes #133–136, hc, 120 pages, 2009, ISBN 0-7851-4006-9; tpb, 2010, ISBN 0-7851-4091-3)
- Dark Reign: Hawkeye #1–5 (with Tom Raney and Andres Guinaldo (#5), 2009–2010) collected as Dark Reign: Hawkeye (tpb, 120 pages, 2010, ISBN 0-7851-3850-1)
  - Issue #5 is co-written by Diggle and Antony Johnston.
- Daredevil: Shadowland Omnibus (hc, 1,112 pages, 2018, ISBN 1-302-91037-X) includes:
  - Dark Reign: The List—Daredevil (with Billy Tan, one-shot, 2009) also collected in Dark Reign: The List (hc, 232 pages, 2010, ISBN 0-7851-4236-3; tpb, 2010, ISBN 0-7851-4806-X)
  - Daredevil (with Roberto de la Torre and Marco Checchetto (#503, 505–507, 510, 512); issues #505–510 and 512 are co-written by Diggle and Antony Johnston, 2009–2010) also collected as:
    - The Devil's Hand (collects #501–507 and the Dark Reign: The List—Daredevil one-shot, tpb, 200 pages, 2010, ISBN 0-7851-4113-8)
    - Shadowland: Daredevil (collects #508–512, hc, 144 pages, 2011, ISBN 0-7851-4990-2; tpb, 2011, ISBN 0-7851-4522-2)
  - Shadowland #1–5 (with Billy Tan, 2010–2011) also collected as Shadowland (hc, 144 pages, 2011, ISBN 0-7851-4762-4; tpb, 2011, ISBN 0-7851-4763-2)
  - Daredevil: Reborn #1–4 (with Davide Gianfelice, 2011) also collected as Daredevil: Reborn (hc, 112 pages, 2011, ISBN 0-7851-5132-X; tpb, 2012, ISBN 0-7851-5133-8)
- Six Guns #1–5 (with Davide Gianfelice, 2012) collected as Six Guns (tpb, 112 pages, 2012, ISBN 0-7851-5819-7)
- Captain America: Living Legend #1–4 (scripted by Diggle and Eddie Robson (#3–4) from a plot by Diggle and Adi Granov, art by Granov (#1) and Agustín Alessio, 2013–2014)
  - The release of the series, initially announced for 2011 as Astonishing Captain America, was delayed due to Adi Granov's commitments as a concept artist for Marvel films.
  - Collected as Captain America: Living Legend (tpb, 104 pages, 2014, ISBN 0-7851-5111-7)

=== Dynamite Entertainment ===
- Uncanny (with Aaron Campbell):
  - Uncanny #1–6 (2013–2014) collected as Uncanny: Season of Hungry Ghosts (tpb, 160 pages, 2014, ISBN 1-60690-462-0)
  - Uncanny Season Two #1–6 (2015) collected as Uncanny Season Two (tpb, 144 pages, 2016, ISBN 1-60690-829-4)
- Control #1–6 (co-written by Diggle and Angela Cruickshank, art by Andrea Mutti, 2016) collected as Control (tpb, 160 pages, 2017, ISBN 1-5241-0268-7)
- James Bond (with Luca Casalanguida):
  - James Bond: Hammerhead #1–6 (2016–2017) collected as James Bond: Hammerhead (hc, 160 pages, 2017, ISBN 1-5241-0322-5; tpb, 2018, ISBN 1-5241-0713-1)
  - James Bond: Kill Chain #1–6 (2017) collected as James Bond: Kill Chain (hc, 160 pages, 2018, ISBN 1-5241-0595-3)
  - James Bond: Reflections of Death: "The Hook" (anthology graphic novel, 128 pages, 2020, ISBN 1-5241-1501-0)

=== Other US publishers ===
- Star Wars Tales #18: "Payback" (with Henry Flint, anthology, Dark Horse, 2003)
  - Collected in Star Wars Tales Volume 5 (tpb, 248 pages, 2005, ISBN 1-59307-286-4)
  - Collected in Star Wars Legends: The Empire Omnibus Volume 3 (hc, 1,056 pages, Marvel, 2025, ISBN 1-3029-5979-4)
- Gamekeeper #1–5 (script by Diggle based on the concept by Guy Ritchie, art by Mukesh Singh, Virgin, 2007)
  - Collected as Gamekeeper (hc, 144 pages, 2007, ISBN 1-934413-16-X; tpb, 2007, ISBN 1-934413-09-7)
  - Collected in Gamekeeper Omnibus (tpb, 256 pages, Dynamite, 2011, ISBN 1-60690-177-X)
- Bionic Commando: Chain of Command (with Colin Wilson, 32-page webcomic, Capcom, 2008)
  - First published in print as Bionic Commando: Chain of Command (2009), a one-shot given away for free with the purchase of the eponymous video game at Capcom's online store.
- Image:
  - Thought Bubble Anthology #1: "November in the North of England..." (with D'Israeli, 2011) collected in Thought Bubble Anthology Collection (tpb, 136 pages, 2016, ISBN 1-5343-0067-8)
  - Liberty Annual '12: "Barren Ground" (with Ben Templesmith, anthology, 2012) collected in CBLDF Presents: Liberty (hc, 216 pages, 2014, ISBN 1-60706-937-7; tpb, 2016, ISBN 1-60706-996-2)
  - Thief of Thieves (with Shawn Martinbrough; issues #14–19 are scripted by Diggle from a plot by Diggle, Robert Kirkman and James Asmus, Skybound, 2013–2016) collected as:
    - Venice (collects #14–19, tpb, 128 pages, 2014, ISBN 1-60706-844-3)
    - The Hit List (collects #20–25, tpb, 128 pages, 2014, ISBN 1-63215-037-9)
    - Take Me (collects #26–31, tpb, 128 pages, 2016, ISBN 1-63215-401-3)
    - Gold Rush (collects #32–37, tpb, 128 pages, 2017, ISBN 1-5343-0037-6)
  - Hardcore #1–5 (script by Diggle based on the concept by Robert Kirkman, art by Alessandro Vitti, Skybound, 2018–2019) collected as Hardcore (tpb, 112 pages, 2019, ISBN 1-5343-1229-3)
- Doctor Who vol. 4 (IDW Publishing):
  - Doctor Who: The Hypothetical Gentleman (tpb, 104 pages, 2013, ISBN 1-61377-579-2) includes:
    - Doctor Who Special: "Eagle of the Reich" (with Mark Buckingham, anthology, 2012)
    - "The Hypothetical Gentleman" (with Mark Buckingham, in #1–2, 2012)
  - "The Eye of Ashaya" (with Josh Adams, in #5–6, 2013) collected in Doctor Who: The Eye of Ashaya (tpb, 104 pages, 2013, ISBN 1-61377-675-6)
  - "Sky Jacks" (co-written by Diggle and Eddie Robson, art by Andy Kuhn, in #9–12, 2013) collected as Doctor Who: Sky Jacks (tpb, 112 pages, 2013, ISBN 1-61377-791-4)
- Valiant:
  - Shadowman vol. 5 (with Stephen Segovia (#1–4), Adam Pollina (#3), Shawn Martinbrough (#4), Doug Braithwaite (#5), Renato Guedes (#6–11) and Eric Battle (#9–11), 2018–2019) collected as:
    - Fear of the Dark (collects #1–3, tpb, 112 pages, 2018, ISBN 1-68215-239-1)
    - Dead and Gone (collects #4–7, tpb, 112 pages, 2018, ISBN 1-68215-287-1)
    - Rag and Bone (collects #8–11, tpb, 112 pages, 2019, ISBN 1-68215-314-2)
    - Shadowman by Andy Diggle: The Deluxe Edition (collects #1–11, hc, 320 pages, 2021, ISBN 1-68215-372-X)
  - Incursion #1–4 (scripted by Alex Paknadel from a plot by Diggle and Paknadel, drawn by Doug Braithwaite, 2019)
- Comixology:
  - Prométhée 13:13 #1–2 (of 4) (with Shawn Martinbrough, digital, 2019)
    - The last two issues were never published by Comixology separately, and the entire story was first released as a digital graphic novel titled Prométhée 13:13 (2020)
    - In 2022, Ablaze Publishing released the entire 4-issue limited series in print via and later collected it as Prométhée 13:13 (tpb, 128 pages, 2023, ISBN 1-68497-105-5)
  - Cold Iron #1–4 (with Nick Brokenshire, digital, 2022) collected in print by Dark Horse as Cold Iron (tpb, 152 pages, 2023, ISBN 1-5067-3087-6)
- The Expanse (Boom! Studios):
  - The Expanse: The Dragon Tooth #1–12 (with Rubine (#1–4) and Francesco Pisa, 2023–2024) collected as The Expanse: The Dragon Tooth (hc, 336 pages, 2026, ISBN 979-8892157377)
  - The Expanse: A Little Death #1–4 (co-written by Diggle and Wes Chatham, art by Francesco Pisa, 2025–2026) collected as The Expanse: A Little Death (tpb, 128 pages, 2026, ISBN 979-8892159975)

Preceded by Steve MacManus	Sonic the Comic editor 1999–2000	Succeeded by Steve MacManus
Preceded by David Bishop	Judge Dredd Megazine editor 1999–2000	Succeeded by David Bishop
Preceded by David Bishop	2000 AD editor 2000–2002	Succeeded by Matt Smith
Preceded by Brian K. Vaughan	Swamp Thing writer 2004	Succeeded by Will Pfeifer
Preceded by Denise Mina	Hellblazer writer 2007–2008	Succeeded by Peter Milligan
Preceded by Christos Gage	Thunderbolts writer 2009	Succeeded by Jeff Parker
Preceded by Ed Brubaker	Daredevil writer 2009–2011	Succeeded by Mark Waid
Preceded by Peter Milligan	Shadowman writer 2018–2019	Succeeded by Cullen Bunn
