= Judge Dredd versus Aliens: Incubus =

2003 comic book crossover

- Judge Dredd versus Aliens: Incubus #1, Dark Horse Comics (March 2003). Art by Greg Staples.
- Publisher: Rebellion Developments (U.K.); Dark Horse Comics (U.S.)
- Publication date: December 2002 – April 2003
- Genre: Science fiction
- Title(s): Judge Dredd versus Aliens: Incubus #1–4 (U.S.); 2000 AD #2003 and #1322–1335 (U.K.)

Creative team
- Writer(s): John Wagner; Andy Diggle
- Artist: Henry Flint
- Colourist: Chris Blythe
- Editor: Matt Smith
- Judge Dredd vs. Aliens: Incubus: ISBN 1-904265-10-3
- Judge Dredd vs. Aliens: Incubus: ISBN 1-56971-983-7

Judge Dredd versus Aliens: Incubus is an intercompany crossover, featuring Judge Dredd and the Xenomorph from the Alien franchise. It was published in 2003, weekly in 2000 AD and as a monthly miniseries by Dark Horse Comics.

== Plot ==
A shoot out in a traffic jam, an all too common occurrence in the teeming and turbulent Mega-City One, inevitably draws the attention of the judges. Carlos Lenning a.k.a. Jeremiah, the anti-judicial activist, is in hot pursuit of Jimson James "Jimmy" Godber, a small-time crook, headed for Eisenhower Hospital. But Godber only arrives inside in time for a chestburster to erupt from his chest. Judge Dredd gets on the case and summons the Verminator team in order to follow up the various leads on the criminal associates of the late Godber.

The Verminators seal off the hospital and begin their search. Meanwhile, the judges learn that Godber had planned to exploit the Aliens for illegal pit fighting and wagering, leading them in turn to Godber's warehouse hideout and a deadly clutch of Alien eggs. They also find Godber's dead neighbor, murdered in revenge for noise pollution, and the dead husks of face huggers. Suddenly Judge Brubaker is ambushed by a live facehugger suddenly hatching from an egg. Leaping to his defense, the Verminators discover that Aliens bleed deadly acid. The Judges have underestimated the danger and are losing control, as the Alien attacks.

As the body count rises steeply, the judges rush back to the hospital where things are just as bad. Evacuating the hospital they eventually eliminate a second alien, but then reassessing the trace evidence leads to the conclusion that there may already be many more Aliens on the loose. Jeremiah's driver, Futsie, is still at large. Futsie has descended into the Undercity where he meets with Mr Bones, the architect of the entire evil plan.

Walking with Futsie ever deeper into his lair, Bones outlines his plan for the 'Incubus' as he calls the Aliens. Bones discovered them during his days as a space pirate and brought some back to serve his scheme for revenge upon Mega-City One. It rapidly becomes clear that there is already a vast hive beneath the city ready to be unleashed.

Throwing Futsie to the monsters, Bones prepares the final stages of his dastardly plan. The Alien hive has been cultivated directly beneath the Grand Hall of Justice and Bones deploys a shaped charge to blow an entry for hordes of killer aliens into the Grand Hall. Things look grim for the judges, even backed by assault squads and the Verminators. Judge Giant, with the command codes, is able to fight his way to the sub-armory to activate the four Mechanismo robo-judges, finally turning the tide and repelling the Aliens back underground.

But in the struggle, the raw recruit Judge Sanchez is taken by the enemy, and Dredd goes in alone to bring her back. They both become infected in the rescue. Dredd and Sanchez must find the way to destroy the Aliens and save themselves. Bones wears a special device to prevent the Aliens from turning upon him. As they escape, Dredd and Sanchez destroy Bones device, leaving Bones to be torn apart by the Aliens. Then upon discovery of the Alien Queen, the source of all the eggs, Dredd and Sanchez open fire upon a nearby geothermal heating tower to Mega-City One above, in hopes of releasing the magma to destroy her. But the geothermal heating tower proves too solidly constructed until Packer, leader of the Verminators, soaring in to the fray, fires upon the geothermal heating tower with her own heavier weaponry. The ensuing magma flow finally wipes out the deadly Alien hordes. Dredd and Sanchez escape and doctors remove the chestbursters just in time before they can erupt. The doctors are eager to study the extracted Alien chestbursters, but thinking better of that idea, Judge Dredd summarily executes the deadly creatures. "I'm just not the motherly type" quips Dredd, sardonically.

== Characters ==
Judges include:

- Judge Dredd
- Judge Giant
- Judge Sanchez, only a month out of the Academy
- Judge Hershey
- Mechanismo
- Judge Brubaker, the first Judge to become infected by the creatures
- Judge Gomer
- Judge Bevan
- Judge Pitt
- Judge Combell

A team of pest controllers (Verminators) also took a prominent role:

- Packer, the leader of the team
- Millar
- Marinello
- Fisk, Marinello's fiancé
- Wilson
- Maier
- Butterman
- Orson
- Shook

Villains include:

- Jimson James "Jimmy" Godber, a small-time crook
- Carlos Lenning (a.k.a. Jeremiah), an anti-judicial activist
- Frank Rimm (a.k.a. Futsie), another activist
- Mr Bones

== Collections ==
Judge Dredd versus Aliens: Incubus has been collected in three volumes:

- Rebellion Developments, paperback, 104 pages, 2003, ISBN 1-904265-10-3
- Dark Horse, paperback, 104 pages, 2004, ISBN 1-56971-983-7
- Rebellion Developments, hardcover, 112 pages, 2007, ISBN 1-905437-14-5

== See also ==
- Predator vs. Judge Dredd
