= James Bond (Dynamite Entertainment) =

Comic book series

- James Bond 007: VARGR (2015); Retailer Incentive #2 Cover Art by Stephen Mooney

Publication information
- Publisher: Dynamite Entertainment
- Genre: Action/adventureSpy
- Publication date: November 2015 – Present
- No. of issues: 101 (as of March 2024 cover date)
- Main character: James Bond

Creative team
- Written by: Warren Ellis; Benjamin Percy
- Artist(s): Jason Masters; Rapha Lobosco
- Letterer: Simon Bowland
- Colorist(s): Guy Major; Chris O'Halloran
- Editor: Joseph Rybandt

Collected editions
- Volume 1: VARGR: ISBN 1606909010
- Volume 2: Eidolon: ISBN 1524102725

James Bond is a line of spy thriller comic book titles by Dynamite Entertainment featuring the eponymous character originally created by Ian Fleming. It is licensed by Ian Fleming Publications and debuted in November 2015. Additional series and graphic novels are planned.

== Publication history ==
=== Monthly series ===
In October 2014, Dynamite Entertainment announced plans to publish monthly James Bond comics as part of a ten-year licensing deal with Ian Fleming Publications in 2015. Warren Ellis was asked by the Fleming Estate to be the writer, and he requested Jason Masters be the artist. Their first six issue story, VARGR, was announced July 2015. Ellis read all the Fleming novels to prepare for the book, and he named Risico as a particular influence. Masters based his design for Bond on Fleming's descriptions, an illustration commissioned by Fleming, and the work of John McLusky, the first artist to draw Bond in a comic. When asked about the meaning of the title, Ellis explained "VARGR is an Old Norse word meaning variously wolf, evildoer or destroyer."

The first was published November 4, 2015 to coincide with the release of Spectre and offered nine variant covers. It was the 69th best selling issue of the month with estimated orders of 35,600. A hardcover collection of the first six issues was released June 21, 2016.

The same day the hardcover was released, Dynamite published the first chapter of Ellis and Masters' follow-up story, Eidolon. as issue #7. The comic features a modern twist on SPECTRE, an evil organization Bond has previously encountered in both novels and films. Ellis developed the plot after reading Umberto Eco's Numero Zero.

On 5 October 2016, Dynamite announced that writer Benjamin Percy was set to pen a story for a future installment in the monthly series, taking over from Warren Ellis. Two months later, the title was unveiled as Black Box, which reset the issue numbering of the eponymous James Bond series from that of the 2015 run. The art is illustrated by Rapha Lobosco, and the comic made its debut on 1 March 2017 as James Bond (2017) issue #1. With the development of the story and the elements used in the first issue, Percy told he was influenced by the film series in writing the structure of the story, The Spy Who Loved Me and Spectre being most of the recognizable citations, while reflecting on the inner thoughts of Bond's psychology he claims to have derived from the novels.

On 16 July 2018, a new ongoing series was announced with Greg Pak and Marc Laming at the helm (Colorist – Rosh, Letterer – Ariana Maher), of which the first story arc is to feature a new iteration of Oddjob envisioned as a Korean secret agent rivaling that of Bond in the field.

On 10 October 2023, another ongoing series was announced with Garth Ennis writing Bond for the first time, joined by Rapha Lobosco on art. The story finds Bond tracking down a deadly substance called Stalvoda, and introduces a new character, an older ex-spy named Archie Tryon.

=== Additional entries ===
On 19 July 2016, Dynamite announced a new miniseries by writer Andy Diggle and artist Luca Casalanguida titled Hammerhead would be released in October. The first issue will have three variant covers. On 26 September 2016, artist Robert Hack revealed his own retro-based variant cover for the first issue exclusive for CBLDF's Retailer Membership. The story with all of its issues will be collected in a hardcover, set to come out on May 3, 2017.

On 20 February 2017, Dynamite announced a one-shot installment in the series titled Service, written by Kieron Gillen and illustrated by Antonio Fuso, and was released in May later that year.

On 17 April 2017, a new miniseries was announced with Diggle and Casalanguida, along with the rest of the crew returning from Hammerhead in a follow-up, called Kill Chain, offering many variant covers for the first issue, set to debut in the month of July.

In August 2017, Dynamite unveiled yet another one-shot Bond comic to be brought by writer and illustrator Ibrahim Moustafa, titled Solstice, set for a November 2017 release.

On 4 October 2017, Dynamite announced a new six-issue miniseries entitled The Body written by Ales Kot, making its debut in January 2018.

=== Adaptations ===
A faithful graphic novel adaptation of the Casino Royale book was planned for hardcover release in November 2016, standalone from either of the established timelines, adapted by Van Jensen and illustrated by Dennis Calero. However, Southworth left the project due to creative differences, and was replaced with Dennis Calero as the artist, while the cover artwork is provided with by Fay Dalton. After months in the pipeline, Dynamite released the graphic novel on 11 April 2018. Dynamite is planning to release the adaptation of next novel Live and Let Die adapted by Van Jensen and illustrated by Kewber Baal on September 11, 2019.

=== James Bond Origin ===
A forthcoming series will be a period piece expanding on Bond's life prior to the events of Fleming's first novel involving his secret agent character, which was officially announced by Dynamite at the 2017 Diamond Summit event, set during World War II with Bond at the beginning of his spy career, originally aimed for release sometime during Fall 2017. On 18 June 2018, James Bond Origin was officially unveiled by Dynamite as an ongoing series, of which the first issue made its debut in September later in the year, with the first story arc being delivered by Jeff Parker and Bob Q.

=== Spin-offs ===
On 3 October 2016, Dynamite announced a spin-off miniseries titled Felix Leiter which stars the eponymous character, written by James Robinson and illustrated by Aaron Campbell and debuted in January 2017. On 23 May 2017, another spin-off was announced, Moneypenny, which centers on M's secretary and security agent, Moneypenny herself, to be written by Jody Houser and illustrated by Jacob Edgar, set for August 2017 release. On 21 November 2017, a third spin-off was announced aimed for February 2018 release, a 40-page one-shot comic book centered on M himself, exploring his backstory as well as dealing with his past that comes back to haunt him, delivered by creators Declan Shalvey and P.J. Holden.

== Plot ==
=== Vargr ===
British Intelligence agent James Bond is assigned by his boss, M, to take up the workload of a deceased fellow agent who was working on a case related to a European drug smuggling syndicate. Following a lead to Berlin, Bond is met by Dharma Reach, who is posing as a CIA contact. She tries to kill him, but fails and escapes. Bond meets with Slaven Kurjak, a rich Serbian scientist who was disabled during the Kosovo War. Kurjak now develops advanced technology for prosthetics. When asked about the unusual drugs spreading across London and Europe, Kurjak directs Bond to a suspicious laboratory. Unbeknownst to 007, Kurjak is the one who sent Dharma to kill him. At the laboratory, Bond engages in a firefight with a Lebanese crime clan. After the battle is over, Bond learns that he was tricked by Kurjak and the Lebanese were not connected to the drugs.

Kurjak sends Bryan Masters to kill Bond at the Berlin MI-6 station. Bond is not there, but Masters kills the staff who are. When Bond arrives at the station, Masters introduces himself as a CIA agent and wants to escort Bond to a secure location since the Berlin Station was ambushed. Although Bond secretly knows Masters is an enemy, they travel together to Kurjak's security resort, where Kurjak's staff are found dead from Kurjak's drug tests, known as "Condition Vargr." Masters attacks Bond, who kills him by injecting him with the drug. Kurjak reveals himself and traps Bond in a sealed chamber. Kurjack explains the drug has been his life's work since the concentration camps in Kosovo. It was supposed to be a cure for cancer, but it kills anyone who uses it. Kurjak now plans to use the drug to control the world. He activates a decontamination cycle process in the chamber and leaves Bond to die, but Bond escapes.

Bond returns to London and reports the incidents. He is sent to liaise with MI-5, who have been quarantining the places where the drug has spread. While looking for the MI-5 team, Bond is attacked by and kills Dharma Reach. With the help of Bill Tanner, Bond traces Reach's prosthetics to a decommissioned Norwegian battleship, the HNoMS Vargr. Bond infiltrates Vargr and discovers the laboratory where Kurjak's drugs are developed. He plants explosive devices but is found by Kurjak and attacked by prosthetic enhanced henchmen. Bond evacuates and detonates the bombs, sinking Vargr. Afterwards, Bond sees an injured Kurjak crawling on the shore and executes him.

=== Eidolon ===
Following the events of the exposure of dark money transferred from the backdoor channels of electronic bank accounts using legitimate company firms as fronts putting into British soil, James Bond is sent to Los Angeles to retrieve a forensic accountant planted by the MI-6 in the Turkish Consulate, Cadence Birdwhistle, to study backchannel financial movement and discovered the leak for which she is targeted by Turkish MIT Service gunmen and other rogue CIA operatives. Equipped with weaponry provided to him by his trustworthy CIA ally, Felix Leiter, Bond takes out the assailants and smuggles Cadence out of the US back to London.

Upon their arrival at Heathrow Airport, Bond and Cadence are attacked by unidentified mercenaries led by a man called Beckett Hawkwood, which they are not aware of, but nevertheless manage to survive due to their containment in a heavily armoured car, which drives them safely back to the MI-6 headquarters at Vauxhall. At debriefing with M, Bond states that the weapons used on them by the mercenaries are C8 Carbines fitted with UGLs which are SAS and SBS standard issue items, both being financed by the MI-5. They also discover that the operation of the financial transfers of dark money are labeled under the name of "Eidolon", which intrigues M into suspecting there might be an obvious connection from a past enemy organization.

Meanwhile, with the aid of Bill Tanner, Cadence discovers the entire chain of the Eidolon transactions that are moved through deep cover MI-5 channels to a final stop that is the Box Tunnel where the country's domestic intelligence service draws an administration from. M sends 007 on an off-records mission to infiltrate the tunnel and investigate the happenings inside, where Bond himself discovers an ongoing attack being planned by a group of secret society. After sparking into a gunfight and slightly missing Hawkwood who flees the scene, Bond abducts one of the injured underlings and tortures the information out of him regarding the entity of Eidolon. It turns out that M's suspicion of the shortcomings was right, as Eidolon is revealed to be a system of SPECTRE stay-behinds initiated during World War II, along with the exposition of Hawkwood's identity, a former apparent war hero, as one of the four global lead assets of the operation.

MI-5 agent, Eve Sharma approaches Bond off-duty later on to discuss a rogue operation's existence in a secret cell within her organization, to which Bond informs her with the truth and the involvement of the SPECTRE stay-behinds. The next day, M, with the company of Cadence and Moneypenny, goes to meet the head of MI-5, Sir Stephen Mackmain and the Intelligence Services Commissioner to discuss the irrelevance of The Hard Rule, a policy that prevents MI-6 agents from carrying firearms on British soil (which was also a problem in the VARGR storyline). During the heated conversation between M and Mackmain, whose hypocrisy in the formation of rule ranged on surface, the latter unveils his true schemes and takes M as well as the rest of the crew as a hostage, with Hawkwood himself eliminating the London Metropolitan Police counter-terrorism unit protecting them. Mackmain's purpose is to resurrect SPECTRE and take over both domestic and foreign intelligence roles worldwide. Just in time, Bond and Eve attack Hawkwood's team and invade into the safehouse where a heavy shootout occurs, killing Mackmain in the process. Hawkwood, however, escapes and Bond gives a pursuit in an intense car chase, but fails to capture Hawkwood.

Reaching his own extraction point, Hawkwood collects and prepares to deploy a volumetric vacuum bomb at the Houses of Parliament to announce the return of SPECTRE. Before ensuing the catastrophe, he also intends to assassinate Cadence to silence her and prevent her from testifying against Mackmain in a political trial. But, he's soon discovered by Bond, who pursues him on the streets of London with Hawkwood behind the wheel of a truck carrying the fuel-air bomb, attempting to drive in to the MI-6 Headquarters and detonate the bomb there. 007 sabotages the truck, and continues the assault on foot when the two men engage in a violent fistfight, with Hawkwood almost gaining the upper hand. Bond, at the nick of time, manages to injure Hawkwood with a knife and manipulates him into taking his own life with self-pity as Bond watches him from afar, smoking his cigarette in relief after the prevention of the terror.

=== Black Box ===
While on a mission to infiltrate the Tokyo underworld, James Bond investigates Saga Genji, a very influential rich tech mogul, who is responsible for the creation of The Black Box, an artificially controlled cubicle device that contains data regarding universal worldwide government secrets involving agencies, organizations and deep cover operations, willing to sell them to the highest bidder. While on pursuit, 007 finds himself being aided by a freelance shadowy assassin going by the name of Selah Sax, a former member of an extinct deep cover British government black ops unit, who herself tends to eliminate other unjustly assassins with the sole determination to protect Britain.

== Collected editions ==
=== Main series ===
| Title | Material collected | Publication date | ISBN |
|---|---|---|---|
| James Bond: Volume 1: VARGR | collects James Bond (2015) #1–6 | July 5, 2016 | 9781606909010 |
| James Bond: Volume 2: Eidolon | collects James Bond (2015) #7–12 | March 7, 2017 | 9781524102722 |
| James Bond: Hammerhead | collects James Bond: Hammerhead #1–6 | May 23, 2017 | 9781524103224 |
| James Bond: Black Box | collects James Bond: Black Box #1–6 | November 7, 2017 | 978-1524104092 |
| James Bond: Kill Chain | collects James Bond: Kill Chain #1–6 | April 17, 2018 | 9781524105952 |
| James Bond: The Body | collects James Bond: The Body #1–6 | October 30, 2018 | 9781524107567 |
| James Bond Origin Vol.1 | collects James Bond Origin #1–6 | May 21, 2019 | 9781524109769 |
| James Bond Origin Vol.2 | collects James Bond Origin #7–12 | July 14, 2020 | 9781524112684 |
| James Bond 007 Vol.1 | collects James Bond 007 #1–6 | August 6, 2019 | 9781524112035 |
| James Bond 007 Vol.2 | collects James Bond 007 #7–12 | November 10, 2020 | 9781524113667 |
| James Bond: Big Things | collects James Bond (2019) #1–6 | October 19, 2021 | 9781524119119 |
| James Bond: Agent of Spectre | collects James Bond: Agent of Spectre #1–5 | August 29, 2023 | 9781524120474 |
| James Bond: Himeros | collects James Bond: Himeros #1–5 | September 12, 2023 | 9781524121730 |
| 007 Book 1: Myrmidon | collects James Bond: 007 (2023) #1–6 | May 7, 2024 | 9781524123208 |
| 007: For King & Country | collects 007: For King & Country #1–6 | March 19, 2024 | 9781524124014 |

=== Spin-off series ===
| Title | Material Collected | Publication Date | ISBN |
|---|---|---|---|
| James Bond: Felix Leiter | collects Felix Leiter #1–6 | March 7, 2017 | 9781524104702 |
| James Bond: Case Files | collects One-shot Specials: SERVICE; MONEYPENNY; SOLSTICE; M | July 17, 2018 | 9781524106782 |

=== Graphic novels ===
| Title | Publication Date | ISBN |
|---|---|---|
| James Bond: Reflections of Death | September 29, 2020 | 9781524115012 |

=== Adaptations ===
| Title | Publication Date | ISBN |
|---|---|---|
| James Bond: Casino Royale | April 24, 2018 | 9781524100681 |
| James Bond: Live And Let Die | December 17, 2019 | 9781524112721 |

== Critical reception ==
According to review aggregator Comic Book Round Up, the first issue received an average score of 7.4/10. Newsarama reviewer David Pepose thought Ellis' version of Bond was the "purest crystallization of the character ... since the original novels" and praised the removal of Bond's bigotry. John McCubbin, reviewing for SnapPow, criticized the comic's pace and Bond's lack of flair while calling Masters' art "the most impressive part about this opening issue." Dom Reardon's cover for the first issue was re-used as the cover for the 21st issue of Bleeding Cool magazine, which was focused on war comics.

== See also ==
- James Bond (comics)
- Outline of James Bond
