= James Bond 007: Service =

- James Bond 007: Service (2017); Cover Art by Jamie McKelvie

Publication information
- Publisher: Dynamite Entertainment
- Genre: Spy; Action/Adventure
- Publication date: 24 May 2017
- No. of issues: 1
- Main character: James Bond

Creative team
- Written by: Kieron Gillen
- Artist: Antonio Fuso
- Letterer: Simon Bowland
- Colorist: Chris O'Halloran
- Editor: Joseph Rybandt

Collected editions
- James Bond 007: Service: ISBN 978-1-5241-0407-8

James Bond 007: Service is a 2017 spy thriller one-shot comic book published by Dynamite Entertainment, featuring Ian Fleming's secret agent character, James Bond in the leading role, written by Kieron Gillen and illustrated by Antonio Fuso. The comic is licensed by Ian Fleming Publications and as such, spun off from the monthly ongoing James Bond series, coming out as a one-off special in the franchise.

== Plot ==
Presumably set after the events of Brexit, a word was received by MI-6 from an unidentified source that the newly appointed U.S. Secretary of State Alexander Thomas was being targeted by a shadowy radical nationalist group after he made a political statement against United Kingdom and their lack of usefulness to the United States in the aftermath of their recent turnouts within their own government.

The trail leads British Intelligence agent, James Bond to Denbigh North, a district in Milton Keynes, to track down the recent residence of a former marine Jack Marshall. But, before 007 could allow himself to Marshall's hotel room, he dodges an explosion wired in the old methods of booby traps commonly employed during World War II. In contact with M, joined by Major Boothroyd they extract Marshall's characteristics as a fantasist who views himself and his group as an auxiliary unit, a combat team that fights an enemy invading Britain, created during the Second World War to defy the powers of Nazi Germany. And Marshall believes Britain needs defending from the likes of Alexander Thomas, hence making the latter "an enemy of the state" from their point of view, therefore reporting what they see as enemy action, including Thomas' comments, to intelligence services using Enigma Code, just like how the actual units used to do during the war.

Having detected a GPS ping around the area, M instructs Bond to an abandoned World War II bunker and informs him to wait for an armed support, since he's not permitted to carry a firearm inside the British soil under the orders of The Hard Rule (a problem that MI-5 kickstarted upon MI-6 agents in the VARGR storyline). However, before the fireteam could get there in time, Bond is knocked unconscious and captured by Marshall's comrades. Convinced that the British Intelligence is infiltrated by pro-EU moles to strip Britain from its own authority, the team urges to kill 007 but Marshall spares and takes him with them along, captive at the Imperial War Museum where U.S. Secretary Thomas was going to hold a press conference.

At the museum, Marshall and his team commence attack and eliminate Thomas' bodyguards, just in time Bond breaks free from his zip-tie handcuffs using a hidden blade in his wristwatch, acquires a Sten submachine gun from a dead goon he terminated in the process and goes after Marshall who already has had Secretary Thomas cornered. Bond takes the shot before Marshall could kill Thomas and saves the latter's life, an act which he believes to persuade Thomas to change his political tactics towards Britain.

== Publication history ==
On 20 February 2017, Dynamite announced a one-shot installment in the series titled Service, set to be written by Kieron Gillen and illustrated by Antonio Fuso, with a release date set for May 2017. For the particular influence of the story, Gillen stated that the current political climate was to play a role in the plot's narrative.
