= James Bond 007: Hammerhead =

- James Bond 007: Hammerhead #1 (2016); Cover Art by Ron Salas

Publication information
- Publisher: Dynamite Entertainment
- Genre: Spy; Action/Adventure
- Publication date: 12 October 2016 - 29 March 2017 (Single issues); 3 May 2017 (Collected Hardback)
- No. of issues: 6
- Main character: James Bond

Creative team
- Written by: Andy Diggle
- Artist: Luca Casalanguida
- Letterer: Simon Bowland
- Colorist: Chris Blythe
- Editor: Joseph Rybandt

Collected editions
- Hardcover: ISBN 1524103225

James Bond 007: Hammerhead is a spy thriller comic book miniseries featuring Ian Fleming's secret agent, James Bond, in the central role of the plot, written by Andy Diggle and illustrated by Luca Casalanguida. It is a standalone story arc that spun off from the ongoing James Bond line published by Dynamite Entertainment and licensed by Ian Fleming Publications, making its debut in October 2016 and finished the course of its storyline in March 2017. A collected edition of all the issues was published in hardback in May 2017.

== Plot ==
After returning from Venezuela to learn that Hunt Engineering, Britain's leading arms manufacturer, was targeted by a mysterious figure going by the codename of 'Kraken', a radical anti-capitalist, whose underlings he was sent to kill, James Bond is assigned on behalf of the British Intelligence to attend the Dubai Arms Fair and make contact with Hunt Engineering where they will be showcasing their newly developed weapons, for which M is under the impression that Kraken will be making another attempt on the firm. Bond meets Victoria Hunt, the daughter of Lord Hunt, the company's owner, who gives him a tour of all the products they have manufactured, including a technically advanced firearm rounds called APHEX and a massively large sized, heavily modified and overdeveloped railgun given the name of 'Hammerhead'.

Bond is invited to a gala held by Lord Bernard Hunt, whom he briefly meets before a sudden hostile attack ensues by masked gunmen in heavy combat armors. Lord Hunt is killed in the process with a headshot by a bullet which 007 identifies as an APHEX round, an off-the-market product manufactured by Hunt Engineering, suspecting the existence of a manipulative insider within the company. Bond manages to kill the assailants and protects Victoria in the process. After identifying the group of attackers, Bond tracks their source down to Al Hajjarah in Yemen and heads over there, escorted by Victoria in her personal jet, in which both have a romantic encounter. Meanwhile, at the Outer Hebrides, a Royal Navy helicopter transporting decommissioned Hunt warheads was shut down and its containment disappeared. Upon learning the news, Bond classifies the attack as a scheme planned and executed by Kraken.

Arriving at the Yemeni airport, Bond acquires a facilitated MI-6 vehicle by the Q-Branch, a gadget-laden Ford Mustang sports car, and drives to the location he tracked the source of the late gunmen down, kills the remaining members of the team, only to find out that their current involvement in the case was to deliver the smuggled goods to Karim Malfakhar. He contacts Bill Tanner to inform him of the grasp he has on the case, who tells him in return that Kraken isn't targeting the warheads but stealing them. Suddenly, Bond's car eliminates the connection with Tanner and enables the auto-pilot mode on its own, making several attempts to kill him. Bond, however, manages to manipulate the car into taking a leap over the edge of a cliff which falls into its own destruction. Among the remains of the vehicle, Bond finds the computer software microchip inserted into the source and identifies it as a product of Hunt Engineering, knowing that Kraken has been keeping an eye on him. Soon thereafter, in the middle of the Yemeni desert, Bond is captured and tranquilized by a group of mobsters led by a man who introduces himself as Malfakhar, the aforementioned smuggler.

Untrusting of his employer, Malfakhar tells Bond he had orders to smuggle a nuclear bomb, unrelated to that of the incident at the Hebrides, and eliminate the British agent. But, his orders from Kraken to wait for further instructions made him suspicious, hence 007 proposes an allegiance with him by revealing to him that the actual nuclear containment is missing, with the casing sent Malfakhar's way for distraction. Using the microchip to extract information from, Bond and Malfakhar track down the nuclear containment into a warhead in custody of The Bodicea, a militarized ship registered to Hunt Engineering, who are preparing to use Hammerhead to fire it at an undisclosed location on Kraken's orders. Bond, Malfakhar and his men engage in a firefight with the ship's crew and take over control of it, preventing Hammerhead from launching the warhead. And in the meantime, Bond comes to deduce the true identity of Kraken.

At the Outer Hebrides, in a nuclear reprocessing facility known as Black Crannog, M and Moneypenny meet the Defence Minister and Victoria Hunt for an official meeting discussion over the matters of public inquiry regarding Kraken's attacks. But, eventually, as Moneypenny is alerted of an attack on the facility, Victoria reveals herself as Kraken and captures them all as her hostages, killing the Defence Minister in the process. She explains her schemes being about restoring the British Empire to its former glory and wipe out the entirety of London and dismantling the current government with the hope of rebuilding it all anew by her own administration.

Bond is extracted by Malfakhar at an undisclosed coordination in the middle of the Outer Hebrides and lands on HMS Vengeance, a Royal Navy ballistic missile submarine, and circulates Black Crannog with a stable plan along with the crew as well as the additional assistance from other Royal Navy battleships to unleash an attack on the base and eliminate Victoria Hunt. As they are to deploy an underwater team for the planned assault, HMS Vengeance is taken over remotely by Victoria's Kraken system and fires a nuclear missile away, giving the team (including 007) thirty minutes to stop the missile before it hits London. However, as they approach the Black Crannog, the entirety of the team was eliminated with the Hammerhead railgun, just in time Bond takes a leap into the sea for his life and survives. Believed dead, Bond sneaks into the base and takes over the Hammerhead, killing whoever comes in his way. Knowing Victoria installed backdoor systems to keep track of her own active artillery with microchips, Bond uses the microchip he acquired from his Mustang earlier to get a lock on the fired warhead and destroys it. He also uses the Hammerhead to kill Victoria for good in her own quarters. Bond finds and rescues M and Moneypenny and all the three escape in an MI-6 helicopter just as the facility is destructed in the blast.

At the debriefing of the mission, M informs Bond that Hunt Engineering is now nationalized and acquired by the British government. Before Bond prepares to leave his office, M stops to congratulate him for his good work, showing the mutual respect both men have towards one another.

== Characters ==
- James Bond: Also known by his code-number 007, Bond is a secret agent in employment of the British Secret Service enlisted inside the 00-Section who is assigned to track down the mysterious enemy known as Kraken threatening Britain's national security and avert the schemes of terror.
- Victoria Hunt: The daughter of Lord Bernard Hunt and, by the beginning, the second-in-command of Hunt Engineering, Britain's leading arms manufacturer, who takes over the company after her father was killed by the Kraken's mercenaries. Over the course of the story, she is revealed to be Kraken herself whose schemes are to nuke London by using nuclear warheads decommissioned by her own company and rest the blame on the government's shoulders with the intention of replacing them with her own administration.
- Karim Malfakhar: A Yemeni smuggler who works anonymously under the moniker The Fox (Al-fanac in Arabic) who was hired by Kraken to ship a nuclear bomb from Zinjibar to Outer Hebrides. However, his distrust of his employer brought him to work alongside Bond and help him prevent a warhead launch out of the Mediterranean district.
- Miles Messervy: The head of the British Secret Service, better known by his codename M, who is primarily concerned in dealing with the foreign threats targeting the safety of Britain. He, along with Miss Moneypenny and the Defence Minister, was lured into capture by Victoria Hunt, who holds him hostage and attempts to persuade him into blaming various terrorist cells for the attack to insert the United Kingdom into World War III with countries whose relationships with the former are unstable.
- Moneypenny: M's personal security agent and secretary, both domestically and overseas, who tends to foresee the safety of her superior as well as the secrets he holds. At the nuclear reprocessing facility, she, at one point, holds a gun at M's head in order to prevent Victoria from extracting secrets from him. She is shot in the shoulder by one of Victoria's armed commandos, but eventually survives and dismisses it as a flesh wound.
- Lord Bernard Hunt: The former CEO of Hunt Engineering and the company's founder/establisher, an influential figure in the world of industries, who claims to have known Bond's father, Andrew Bond, back from the old days of the Vickers armament company and as such speaks highly of him. He is shot in the head and killed by a mercenary hired by Kraken.
- Simon Wallis: Britain's Defence Minister, who is invited for the meeting at the Black Crannog nuclear facility alongside M to discuss the illustration of Hunt Engineering's upcoming public inquiry with Victoria Hunt. He is eventually shot and killed by Victoria.
- Bill Tanner: The MI-6 chief of staff who is responsible with briefing and debriefing the field agents of the newest intel on their hands, and as such is the head of the field operations command.
- Saxon: A radical anti-capitalist state-level computer hacker and cyber terrorist who was hired by Kraken to hack into the database of Hunt Engineering and deliver all the vital information to his employer in Venezuela. He was killed during the raid on his hideout unleashed by Bond.

== Publication history ==
On 19 July 2016, Dynamite announced a new miniseries by writer Andy Diggle and artist Luca Casalanguida titled Hammerhead would be released in October. The first issue will have three variant covers. On 26 September 2016, artist Robert Hack revealed his own retro-based variant cover for the first issue exclusive for CBLDF's Retailer Membership. The comic book with all of its issues will be collected in a hardcover, set to come out on May 3, 2017, and as such will be followed by another installment by the same creators, albeit as a standalone entry likewise, entitled Kill Chain which is set to debut in July 2017.

== See also ==
- James Bond (comics)
- James Bond (Dynamite Entertainment)
- Outline of James Bond
