= James Bond: Felix Leiter =

- Felix Leiter #1 (2017); Cover Art by Mike Perkins

Publication information
- Publisher: Dynamite Entertainment
- Genre: Action/adventureSpy
- Publication date: January to June 2017
- No. of issues: 6
- Main character: Felix Leiter

Creative team
- Written by: James Robinson
- Artist: Aaron Campbell
- Letterer: Simon Bowland
- Colorist: Salvatore Aiala
- Editor: Joseph Rybandt

Collected editions
- Hardcover: ISBN 1524104701

James Bond: Felix Leiter is a 2017 American comic book miniseries published by Dynamite Entertainment. The series features the eponymous character, who primarily appears in Ian Fleming's James Bond novels and their movie adaptations. Written by James Robinson and illustrated by Aaron Campbell, the comic book is a spin-off from the James Bond series also published by Dynamite. The series ran from January to June 2017, and marks the first time that Leiter received a solo adventure in any format.

== Publication history ==
The miniseries was first announced in October 2016. During an interview with entertainment media news site Bleeding Cool, Robinson indicated that he had an idea for a trilogy involving Leiter if the first series performs commercially well, as well as eventually being able to grow into a solo series if the project sold well . A full collected edition of all the issues of the first series was published in hardcover format in November 2017.

== Reception ==
The comic's debut issue received mixed reviews. Per comics review aggregator Comic Book Roundup, the first issue had an average score of 6.5 out of 10 from 9 reviewers. Later issues were received more favorably, and the series' average ranking as a whole became a 7.9 out of 10. Critics praised Campbell's artwork, while criticizing the story's exposition. Critic Stephen Schleicher noted that the comic was "flawed but intriguing," but also indicated his belief that the comic would improve. Fandom Post's Chris Beveridge, who reviewed all six issues, gave the series a "B+" grade.
