= 2003 in comics =

The following events happened in the world of comics in the year 2003.

== Events ==
=== January ===
- First issue of Firebreather by Phil Hester and Andy Kuhn and Invincible by Robert Kirkman (both published by Image)

=== February ===
- In the Batman universe, debut of the series Gotham Central by Greg Rucka and Ed Brubaker and of the miniseries Batgirl: Year One by Scott Beatty and Marcos Martin (DC)
- Aida al confine (Aida at the border) – graphic novel by Vanna Vinci; a ghost story inspired by the true life of the author's grandfather (Kappa edizioni).

=== March ===
- March 16: The final Sunday comic episode of Flash Gordon is published, which also marks the end of the series overall, which had been in continuous production since 1934.
- Fantastic Four: Unstable Molecules by James Sturm (Marvel)
- In Buffy the Vampire Slayer (Dark Horse), the arc "Slayer Interrupted" begins.

=== April ===
- Action Comics #800: Double-sized anniversary issue, "A Hero's Journey," by Joe Kelly, Pascual Ferry, and Duncan Rouleau. (DC Comics)
- Generazioni (Generations) – special album for the Martin Mystere’s 20th anniversary, by Carlo Recagno and various cartoonists; it sees a team-up among the hero, his ancestors Docteur Mystere and Cygale and his robotic version of the future (Bonelli).
- April 19: Webcomic Bigtime Consulting comes to a conclusion

=== May ===
- Il faut tuer Lincoln (Lincoln must be killed) – by Francois Corteggiani and Michel Blanc-Dumont, 13th album of the series Blueberry's youth (Dargaud)
- Le nombre maudit, by André-Paul Duchâteau and Tibet, 67. album of the Ric Hochet series (Le Lombard)
- Pyongyang by Guy Delisle (L’association)

=== June ===
- June 30: in Le temps, the first episode of The Sarcophagi of the Sixth Continent, Volume 1: The Universal Threat, by Yves Sente and Andrè Juliard, is prepublished.
- Wolverine vol. 2 is canceled by Marvel with issue #189.
- Born by Garth Ennis and Darick Robertson (Marvel).
- Superman: Red Son by Mark Millar (DC Elseworlds)
- June 10 - Manhwa Dragon Hunter begins publication
- La balle perdue (The lost bullet) – by Derib, 18th album of the Buddy Longway series (Le Lombard).
- The first episode of Fabio Ciccone's webcomic Magias & Barbaridades is published.

=== July ===
- July 18: The first issue of the Croatian comics magazine Q strip is published. It will last until 2013.
- July 22: Blankets by Craig Thompson (Top Shelf)
- Chaos bleeds, by Christopher Golden, Tom Sniegoski and Cliff Richards, one shot Buffy comics attached to the homonymous videogame (Dark Horse).
- First issue of Runaways, by da Brian K. Vaughan and Adrian Alphona (Marvel).

=== August ===
- August 5: The wolves in the walls by Neil Gaiman and David McKean (HarperCollins)
- First issue of The losers (second series) by Andy Diggie and Jock (Vertigo)
- Death: At Death's Door by Jill Thompson (Vertigo)
- Red by Warren Ellis and Cully Hammer (Wildstorm)
- Thor Vikings by Garth Ennis and Glenn Fabry (Marvel)
- First issue of Troubles, by Mark Millar and Frank Cho (Epic Comics)
- JLA-Avengers by Kurt Busiek and George Perez (coproduction Marvel and DC)
- OK corrral by Jean Giraud (27. album of Blueberry series)
- Tecnodoridi, written by Stefano Vietti; Aristotele Skotos, the main villain of the Nathan Never series, is killed in a duel by the hero (Bonelli).

=== September ===
- September 20: Le fleuve de jade, by Jacques Martin, Rafael Morales and Marc Henniquiau; 23rd album of the Alix series (Casterman).
- September 24: Albert Uderzo is honoured as Commandeur des Arts et Lettres.

=== October ===
- October 16: Asterix and the class act by Goscinny and Uderzo (Dargaud)
- October 18–19: During the Stripdagen in Alphen aan den Rijn John Reid, Bastiaan Geleijnse and Jean-Marc van Tol receive the Stripschapprijs. Gerard Roord, publisher of Illustrated Classics wins the Hans P. Frankfurtherprijs. Henk Sprenger, Wim Meuldijk and Gerrit Stapel are the first people to receive a new award, the Bulletje en Boonestaakschaal.
- October 29: Dick Matena's graphic novel adaptation of Gerard Reve's novel De Avonden starts its serialisation in Het Parool. The comic book adaptation will bring Matena tremendous acclaim and pave the way for more graphic novel adaptations of literary classics.
- Smax by Alan Moore and Gene Ha (Wildstorm)
- Pianet X by Grant Morrison and Phil Jimenez (Marvel)
- Marvel 1602, by Neil Gaiman and Andy Kubert.
- Supreme power by J. Michael Straczynski and Gary Frank (Marvel)
- First issue of The walking dead by Robert Kirkman and Tony Moore (Image)
- Fagin the Jew by Will Eisner (Doubleday)
- Fisrst issue of Monster allergy, by Francesco Artibani and Alessandro Barbucci (Walt Disney iItalia)
- The Italian cartoonist Gipi publishes his first graphic novel, Esterno notte (Exterior night), a collection of six stories about violence and decay, set in Roman suburbs-

=== November ===
- First issue of Teen titans go! (DC comics)
- The sandman: endless night by Neil Gaiman (Vertigo)
- Ultimate six by Brian Michael Bendis and Trevor Hirsine (Marvel)
- Play with fire, paperback collecting various Buffy comics by limited diffusion (Dark Horse)

=== December ===
- December 11: Paolo Aldighieri publishes in his personal blog erladan, one of the first Italian webcomcs.
- December 16: In Topolino the first episode of The Lost Explorers' Trail, by Casty and Giorgio Cavazzano is published. It marks the debut of Eurasia Toft, a Disney version of Lara Croft.
- December 24: The final issue of the Flemish comics magazine Suske en Wiske Weekblad is published.
- Wanted by Mark Millar and J. G. Jones (Top Cow)

=== Specific date unknown ===
- The AOL name was finally dropped from Time Warner, which reverted to the Time Warner name.
- Peter van Straaten wins his third Inktspotprijs for Best Political Cartoon.
- Danish animator comic artist Børge Ring is knighted in the Order of the Dutch Lion.
- In Il vernacoliere, debut of Don Zaucker, by Emiliano Pagani and Daniele Caluri.

== Deaths ==
=== January ===
- January 1: Warren Whipple, American comics artist (continued There Oughta Be a Law!), dies at age 92.
- January 2: Jack Keller, American comics artist (Kid Colt) dies at age 80.
- January 8: Franz Drappier, aka Franz, Belgian comics artist (Hypérion, Lester Cockney, Thomas Noland, continued Jugurtha and Jerry Spring), dies at age 54.
- January 10: Ramón Sabatés, Spanish comics artist (Casimiro Noteví, Agente tel TBI, worked on Los Grandes Inventos de TBO), dies at age 87.
- January 14: Rémy Bordelet, French comics artist (continued Big Bill le Casseur), dies at age 71.
- January 20: Mose, French comics artist (Zano, Roméo), dies at age 85.
- January 28: Leoncio Rojas Cruzat, aka Leo, Chilean comics artist (Macabeo, Castañita, Hurgando el Deporte, Pasionario, Contrafuegos, Solterina), dies at age 83.
- January 30:
  - Les Zakarin, American comic inker (Jerry Iger, Quality Comics), dies at age 73.
  - Guido Zamperoni, aka Guy Zam, Italian comics artist, dies at age 90.

=== February ===
- February 22: George A. Ward, American comic artist (assisted on Pogo), dies at age 82.
- February 26:
  - Carlos Freixas, Spanish comics artist (Pistol Jim, Darío Malbrán Psicoanalista, Elmer King, Tucho, de Canilla a Campeón), dies at age 79.
  - Ram Waeerkar, Indian comic artist (Amar Chitra Katha, Suppandi, Nasruddin Hodja, Pyarela), dies at age 66 or 67.
- February 28: Pete Millar, American comics artist (Drag Cartoons, co-creator of CARtoons Magazine), dies at age 73.

=== March ===
- March 2: Bill Woggon, American comics artist (Katy Keene), dies at age 92.
- March 3: Dave Pascal, American cartoonist and comics artist (The New Yorker), dies at age 84.
- March 11: Frans Verstreken, Belgian publisher, writer and curator (organized the annual Salon van de Vlaamse Humor (Salon of Flemish Comedy) exhibition highlighting work by Flemish cartoonists), dies at age 80.
- March 12:
  - Branco Karabajic, Croatian comics artist and animator (Rolf Kauka comics, Pauli, Familie Mausbein), dies at age 77.
  - Thomas Warkentin, American animator, comics writer (continued Flash Gordon) and comic artist (Star Trek newspaper comic), dies at age 67.
- March 16: Auguste, French comic artist (Les Cromagnonneries), dies at age 62.
- March 22: Fernando Carpucino, Italian painter, illustrator and comics artist, dies at age 80.
- Specific date in March unknown: Angus Scott, British comics artist (assisted on Riders of the Range, Belinda Blue Eyes and Ruggles), dies at age 94.

=== April ===
- April 3: Karel Boumans, aka Kabou, Belgian comics artist (De Avonturen van Olivier, Bert Crak, Roel Harding, Studio Vandersteen, continued De Lustige Kapoentjes), dies at age 71.
- April 4: Rudy Florese, Filipino comic artist, dies at age 56.
- April 9: Jerry Bittle, American comics artist (Geech, Shirley and Son), dies at age 53.
- April 14: Ric Hugo, American comics artist (Soliloquy), dies at age 75 or 76.
- April 14: John Kent, New Zealand cartoonist and comics artist (Varoomshka), dies at age 65.

=== May ===
- May 2: Peter Jackson, British comics artist (London Is Stranger Than Fiction), dies at age 81.
- May 8: Leo Bachle, Canadian comics artist (Johnny Canuck), dies at age 79.
- May 14: Dante Quinterno, Argentine cartoonist and comics artist, (Patoruzú, Isidoro Cañones), dies at age 93.
- May 23: Pierce Rice, American comics artist (worked for Harvey Comics), dies at age 86 or 87.
- May 27: Al Hartley, American comics artist (Archie Comics, Christian comics), dies at age 81.

=== June ===
- June 4: Serafín Rojo Caamaño, Spanish comic artist (Doña Tere, Don Panchito y su Hijo Teresito, El Astronauta Saturnino Chiquiflauta, Tip y Coll, Doña Paca Cotilla, Pintador Talí), dies at age 77.
- June 9: Georges Pichard, French comics artist and writer (Ténébrax, Submerman, Blanche Epiphanie, Paulette).
- June 18: Guy Bara, French cartoonist and comic artist (Max L'Explorateur, Kéké Le Perroquet, Cro-Magnon), dies at age 79.

=== July ===
- July 17: Cosper, Danish comics artist (Morkelige Mr. Mox, Alfredo), dies at age 92.
- July 20: William Woolfolk, American novelist, TV writer and comics writer (worked for DC Comics, Marvel Comics, Archie Comics, Fawcett Comics, Quality Comics, Police Comics, Timely Comics), dies at age 86.
- July 24:
  - Irving Dressler, American animator and comics artist (worked for Sangor Studio and American Comics Group, National Periodicals, Better Publications and St. John Publishing), dies at age 90.
  - Warren Kremer, American comics artist (Harvey Comics), dies at age 82.
- July 31: Guido Crepax, Italian comics artist (Valentina), dies at age 70.

=== August ===
- August 9: Bert Wunderink, Dutch comics artist (Bram en Sijm en de Bende van Zwarte Dolf), dies at age 80.
- August 31: Dave Gerard, American comics artist (Citizen Smith, Will-Yum), dies at age 94.

=== September ===
- September 25: Herb Gardner, American playwright, screenwriter and comics artist (The Nebbishes), dies at age 68 from lung disease.
- Specific date in September unknown: Sergio Boffano, Italian-Uruguayan comic artist (Charoná), dies at age 86.

=== October ===
- October 1: Costas Grammatopoulos, Greek painter, engraver, illustrator, poster designer and comics artist (worked on Classics Illustrated), dies at age 87.
- October 5: Alain Bignon, French comic artist, dies at age 56.
- October 12: Pete Morisi, American comics artist (Thunderbolts), dies at age 75.
- October 14: Ned Riddle, American cartoonist and comics artist (Mr. Tweedy), dies at age 90 and 91.

=== November ===
- November 12: John Tartaglione, American comics artist and inker (Marvel Comics, made comics biographies about John F. Kennedy, Lyndon B. Johnson, Pope John Paul II and Mother Teresa), dies at age 82.
- November 29: Len Lawson, Australian comics artist (The Lone Avenger, The Hooded Rider, Diana, Queen of the Apes) and convicted rapist and murderer, dies at age 76 from a heart attack.
- November 30: Kin Platt, American caricaturist, radio writer, TV writer, animation writer, comics artist (Mr. and Mrs., Supermouse), dies at age 91.

=== December ===
- December 5: Bob Gregory, American comics writer/artist (Donald Duck comics, Hanna-Barbera comics) dies at age 82.
- December 20:
  - Edgar Ley, Chinese-born, Belgian comics artist (Frank, various historical comics), dies at age 85 or 86.
  - Hector Saavedra, Argentine comics artist (Disney comics, Looney Tunes comics), dies at age 49 or 50.
- December 25: Art Wetherell, British illustrator and comics artist, dies at age 42.
- December 26: Bill Harrison, American cartoonist (Guess Who...), dies at age 76.
- December 27: Pete Alvarado, American animator and comics artist (Disney comics, Warner Bros. comics, Hanna-Barbera comics), dies at age 83.
- December 29: Don Lawrence, British comics artist, (Storm), dies at age 75.
- Specific date in December unknown: Oliver Passingham, British comics artist and animator (Leslie Shane, Jane Fortune, Rick Martin, Sally Marsh, Zoe Fair, Rick Random), dies at age 78.

=== Specific date unknown ===
- Allan Borgström, Swedish comics artist (Phili Philin), dies at age 89 or 90.
- Antonio Correa Expósito, Spanish comics artist, dies at age 62 or 63.
- Hank P. Meyer, Dutch comic artist (Opie De Eskimo), dies at an unknown age.

== Exhibitions ==
- Summer–early Fall: "Ohio Cartoonists: A Bicentennial Celebration" (Ohio State University) — includes work by Frederick Burr Opper, Edwina Dumm, Richard F. Outcault, and many of the cartoonists who took Charles N. Landon's Cleveland-based correspondence course and were hired by Landon to create cartoon features for the Newspaper Enterprise Association
- Oct 19, 2003-Sep 7, 2004: "Heroes, Heartthrobs and Horrors: Celebrating Connecticut's Invention of the Comic Book" (Connecticut Historical Society, Hartford, Connecticut) — exhibits on Eastern Color Printing and Funnies on Parade

== Conventions ==
- January 11: FLUKE Mini-Comics & Zine Festival (Tasty World, Athens, Georgia)
- January 25: Big Apple Comic Book Art, and Toy Show I (St. Paul's Church Auditorium, New York City)
- January 31–February 2: Creation Comic Book & Pop Culture Convention (Pasadena, California)
- February 1–2: Alternative Press Expo (Concourse Exhibition Center, San Francisco)
- February 9: Emerald City ComiCon (Qwest Field, West Field Plaza, Seattle, Washington) — first annual event; 2,500 attendees; guests: Erik Larsen, John Cassaday, Scott Morse, Pia Guerra, Darick Robertson, Sean Chen, Greg Rucka, Ford Gilmore, Jim Mahfood, Steve Skroce, Mike Huddleston, Steve Rolston, Ian Boothby, Jay Faerber, Matt Haley, Kathleen Webb, John Lustig, David Hahn, Stefano Gaudiano, Donna Barr, Roberta Gregory, Rick Hoberg, Jason Hall, and Brian Snöddy
- February 28–March 2: MegaCon (Orange County Convention Center, Orlando, Florida) — guests include J. Scott Campbell, Scott McDaniel, Chuck Dixon, Frank Cho, George Pérez, Roy Thomas, Greg Land, Jimmy Palmiotti, Amanda Conner, Robert Rodi, Bart Sears, Brian Pulido, and Adam Hughes
- March 22–24: East Coast Hobby Show 2003 (Ft. Washington Expo Center, Philadelphia, Pennsylvania)
- March 23: Toronto Comic Con I (Toronto Hilton Hotel, Toronto, Ontario, Canada) — first edition of this convention, organized by Paradise Comics
- March 29–30: Planet Comicon (Overland Park International Trade Center, Overland Park, Kansas)
- April: Phoenix Comicon (Glendale, Arizona)
- April 5–6: Dallas Comic Con 2.0 (Richardson Civic Center, Plano, Texas) — guests include Tim Bradstreet, Adam Hughes, Dave Dorman, and Frank Cho, Scott Kurtz, Kerry Gammill, Cal Slayton, and Michael Lark. A collectible program book produced with dual covers by artists Dave Dorman and Adam Hughes.
- April 5: Small Press and Alternative Comics Expo (S.P.A.C.E.) (Ohio Expo Center, Rhodes Center, Columbus, Ohio) — special guests: Dave Sim and Gerhard
- April 25–27: Pittsburgh Comicon (Pittsburgh Expomart, Monroeville, Pennsylvania) — guests include Terry Austin, Terry Moore, Wayne Wise, Adam Hughes, Bill Morrison, Erin Gray, George Pérez, Joseph Michael Linsner, Jim Balent, and Michael Turner
- April 26–27: WonderCon (Moscone Center, San Francisco, California) — convention moves from Oakland
- April 27: MicroCon 2003 (Maplewood Community Center, Maplewood, Minnesota)
- May 2–3: Big Apple Comic Book Art, and Toy Show II (St. Paul's Church Auditorium, New York City) — guest of honor Jim Steranko; other guests: Russ Heath, Billy Tucci, Graig Weich, Tony Isabella, Guy Gilchrist, Jim Krueger, Jamal Igle, Robin Riggs, and Jim Salicrup
- May 2–3: Hershey Comicon I (Cocoaplex Cinema, Hershey, Pennsylvania)
- May 16–18: Motor City Comic Con I (Novi Expo Center, Novi, Michigan) — guests include Aaron Bordner, Mark Bode, Dan Brereton, Norm Breyfogle, Guy Davis, Dan Fogel, Frank Kelly Freas, Laura Freas, Gilbert Hernandez, Jaime Hernandez, Vince Locke, William Messner Loebs, James O'Barr, Jim Pitts, Paul Ryan, William Stout, Billy Tucci, Neil Vokes, and Larry Welz
- May 17: East Coast Black Age of Comics Convention (Philadelphia, Pennsylvania) — 50 attendees; guests include William H. Foster III, Jerry Craft, and Anthony Jappa
- May 23–24: Comics 2003 (Bristol, Avon, England, U.K.) — presentation of the National Comics Awards; guests include Jim Lee, Jeff Smith, Dez Skinn, Mike Conroy, Duncan Fegredo, Steve Yeowell, Gary Spencer Millidge, Phil Winslade, Sean Phillips, Mike Carey, Chris Weston, Chris Francis, Phil Hall, Bryan Talbot, Dave Gibbons, John McCrea, John Cassaday, D'Israeli, Staz Johnson, Gary Erskine, Rich Johnston, Nick Locking, and David Hitchcock
- May 30–June 1: Wizard World East (Pennsylvania Convention Center, Philadelphia, Pennsylvania)
- May 31–June 1: Adventure Con 2 (Knoxville Expo Center, Knoxville, Tennessee)
- June 13–15: Heroes Convention (Charlotte Convention Center, Charlotte, North Carolina) — guests include Bob Almond, Jim Amash, Pat Broderick, Frank Brunner, Sal Buscema, Nick Cardy, Richard Case, Steve Conley, Shane Davis, Kim DeMulder, Todd Dezago, Tommy Lee Edwards, Michael Eury, Tom Feister, Lou Ferrigno, Dick Giordano, Cully Hamner, Scott Hampton, Tony Harris, Irwin Hasen, Adam Hughes, Matt Hughes, Greg Hyland, Jamal Igle, Dan Jolley, Bruce Jones, Nat Jones, Jason Latour, Bob Layton, Jon Lewis, David W. Mack, Pop Mhan, Phil Noto, Jeff Parker, George Pratt, Budd Root, Craig Rousseau, Julie Schwartz, Bill Sienkiewicz, Roxanne Starr, Brian Stelfreeze, Karl Story, Roy Thomas, Rich Tommaso, Tim Townsend, Koi Turnbull, George Tuska, Neil Vokes, Loston Wallace, Daniel Way, and Mike Wieringo
- June 13–14: Lexington Sci-Fi Comic Con (Lexington Convention Center, Lexington, Kentucky)
- June 20–21: Hershey Comicon II (Cocoaplex Cinema, Hershey, Pennsylvania)
- June 22: MoCCA Festival (Puck Building, New York City) — guests include Jessica Abel, Signe Baumane, Amanda Conner, Howard Cruse, Evan Dorkin, Phoebe Gloeckner, Klaus Janson, Denis Kitchen, James Kochalka, Peter Kuper, Jason Little, Patrick McDonnell, Mike Mignola, Bill Plympton, Ted Rall, Jeff Smith, Art Spiegelman, and Craig Thompson
- June 27–July 6: Comica — London International Comics Festival (Institute of Contemporary Arts, London, UK) — first iteration of this event, organized by Paul Gravett; guests include Chris Ware, Charles Burns, Joe Sacco, Warren Ellis, Mike Carey, Posy Simmonds, Frédéric Boilet, Sophie Crumb, David Lloyd, Melinda Gebbie, Peter Hogan, Garry Leach, and Gary Spencer Millidge
- July 12–13: Big-D Collectible Show (Hampton Inn Military Pkwy & Hwy 635 Mesquite, Dallas, Texas) — 1500 attendees
- July 17–20: Comic-Con International (San Diego Convention Center, San Diego, California) — 70,000 attendees; official guests: Brian Azzarello, Charles Berberian, Sal Buscema, Philippe Dupuy, Neil Gaiman, Jackson "Butch" Guice, Nalo Hopkinson, Steve Jackson, Geoff Johns, Larry Lieber, Carla Speed McNeil, Kevin O'Neill, Howard Post, and R.A. Salvatore
- July 18–20: Hawaii All-Collectors Show (Neal Blaisdell Exhibition Hall, Honolulu, Hawaii)
- August: "Cyber CAPTION" (Oxford Union Society, Oxford, England) — guests include Carla Speed McNeil
- August 3: Atlanta Comic Convention (Atlanta Marriott Century Center, Atlanta, Georgia)
- August 8–10: Wizard World Chicago (Rosemont Convention Center, Rosemont, Illinois)
- August 22–24: Fan Expo Canada (Metro Toronto Convention Centre, Toronto, Ontario, Canada) — 20,655 attendees; guests include Leonard Nimoy, Ray Park, Adrian Rayment & Neil Rayment Twins (The Matrix), J. August Richards, Connor Trinneer, Denise Crosby, Brian Michael Bendis, Francisco Herrera, Ed McGuinness, Ken Steacy, Darwyn Cooke, Josh Blaylock, and Fred Gallagher
- August 29–September 1: Dragon Con (Hyatt Regency Atlanta/Marriott Marquis, Atlanta, Georgia) — 20,000+ attendees
- September 4–6: International Comics and Animation Festival (ICAF) (Georgetown University, Washington, D.C.) — guests include Francesca Ghermandi, Stefano Ricci, and Lalo Alcaraz
- September 5–6: Big Apple Comic Book Art, and Toy Show III (St. Paul's Church Auditorium, New York City)
- September 5–7: Small Press Expo (Holiday Inn Select, Bethesda, Maryland)
- September 12–14: Raptus 2003 (Bergen Konferanse Senter, Skandic Hotel Bergen, Bergen, Norway) — 4,500 attendees
- September 20–21: Baltimore Comic-Con (Baltimore Convention Center, Baltimore, Maryland)
- September 20–21: Royalfest 2003 (Gateway Center, Collinsville, Illinois) — 3,000–4,000 attendees
- October 3–5: Adventure Con 2.5 (Gatlinburg Convention Center, Gatlinburg, Tennessee)
- October 4–5: FallCon (Education Building at the Minnesota State Fairgrounds, St. Paul, Minnesota)
- October 17–November 2: FIBDA XIV (Amadora, Portugal)
- October 18–19: Motor City Comic Con II (Novi Expo Center, Novi, Michigan) — guests include Kurt Busiek, Andy Lee, and David W. Mack
- October 19: Los Angeles Comic Book and Science Fiction Convention (Shrine Auditorium Expo Center, Los Angeles, California)
- October 19: Maine Comic Book Spectacular (Verrillo's Convention Center, Portland, Maine)
- October 25–26: Dallas Comic Con ("DCC3") (Plano Centre, Plano, Texas) — guests include Tim Bradstreet, Phil Noto, Adam Hughes, Scott Kurtz, John Lucas, Ben Dunn, Jaime Mendoza, Cal Slayton, and Erik Reeves
- October 31–November 3: Las Vegas Comic-Con (Mandalay Bay Convention Center, Las Vegas, Nevada) — first annual event
- October 31–November 2: Lucca Comics and Games (Fair Point, Lucca, Tuscany, Italy) — 50,000 attendees
- November 1: Comic Festival Winter Special (Holiday Inn, Bloomsbury, London, England, U.K.) — guests include Steven Appleby, Mark Buckingham, John M. Burns, Laurence Campbell, Al Davison, Alex Collier, Mike Conroy, Andy Diggle, Simon Donald, Christian Dunn, Ian Edginton, Carl Flint, Paul Gambaccini, Phil Gascoigne, Ian Gibson, Jon Haward, Morris Heggie, P. J. Holden, Jock, Davey Jones, Euan Kerr, Roger Langridge, Metaphrog, Gary Spencer Millidge, Robbie Morrison, Paul Palmer, Siku, Dez Skinn, Kev F. Sutherland, and Lee Townsend
- November 6–9: Coco Bulles (Culture Palace of Abidjan, Côte d'Ivoire)
- November 7–9: Toronto Comic Con II ("Paradise Comics Toronto Comicon") (National Trade Centre, Queen Elizabeth Building, Toronto, Ontario, Canada) — guests of honor: Jim Starlin and Michael William Kaluta
- November 15–16: Kansas City ComiCon (Shawnee Civic Center, Shawnee, Kansas)
- November 21–23: Wizard World Texas (Arlington Convention Center, Arlington, Texas)
- November 28–30: Big Apple Comic Book Art, and Toy Show IV (Metropolitan Pavilion, New York City)
- November 29–30: Mid-Ohio Con (Hilton Columbus Hotel at Easton Town Center, Columbus, Ohio)
- December 7: Boston Comic Book Spectacular (Boston Radisson Hotel, Amesbury, Massachusetts) — 1,000 attendees

== First issues by title ==
Confidential Assassination Troop
Release: by Tong Li Comics. Writer & Artist: Fung Chin Pang
Fluffy
Release: by Jonathan Cape. Writer & Artist: Simone Lia
Opus
Release: November 23 by The Washington Post Company. Writer: Berkeley Breathed Artist: Berkeley Breathed.

xxxHolic
Release: February 24 by Kodansha. Authors: Clamp.
