= 2017 in comics =

Notable events of 2017 in comics. It includes any relevant comics-related events, deaths of notable comics-related people, conventions and first issues by title.

== Events and publications ==
=== March ===
- March 4–5: During the Stripdagen, comics writer Willem Ritstier receives the Stripschapprijs, while Frits Jonker wins the P. Hans Frankfurtherprijs. The Bulletje en Boonestaakschaal is awarded to Albert van Beek.
- March 24: The Dutch comics series Claire by The Wirojas ends it 29 years of publication in the Belgian women's magazine Flair.
- 31 March to 2 April: WonderCon (Anaheim Convention Center in Anaheim, California).
- March to June: I Will Survive, a webcomic published on DeviantArt by William Borba

=== April ===
- April 9: In Antwerp, Belgium, next to the Central Station the theme park Comics Station is officially opened, which puts a spotlight on various Belgian comics characters.
- April 15: The final issue of the Belgian satirical comics and cartoons magazine Pan is published.
- April 21: Canadian comics artist Gisèle Lagacé makes headlines when she is denied entry near the U.S.-Canadian border for a couple of hours for no particular reason.

=== May ===
- May 8:
  - Ken Bald makes the Guinness Book of Records as the oldest active comics artist in the world. He broke this record before on 4 March 2015.
  - American web comics artist Matt Furie decides to kill off his character Pepe the Frog after it became associated with white nationalism, against his will. The event makes headlines all over the Internet.
- May 11: Hollywood actress Goldie Hawn reveals that, at age 19, she was sexually intimidated by comics artist Al Capp (who died in 1978). According to her he tried inviting her to his casting couch, which she refused, much to his anger. She'd had told this anecdote before in a 1985 interview with Playboy, but only now it receives more media attention.
- May 13: In Kansas City comics store owner James Dale, "Jim", Cavanaugh (Clint's Comics) tries to stop a shoplifter, but is thrown to the ground, hitting his head. He is brought to the hospital, where he dies. He was 66 or 67 years old.

=== July ===
- July 12: The first posthumous The Adventures of Nero story, De Zeven Vloeken, starts serialisation in Knack, eight months after the death of Marc Sleen. The artist of this homage comic is Kim Duchateau.
- July 20–23: San Diego Comic-Con, (San Diego Convention Center, San Diego, California).
- Specific date unknown in July: Archie Comics confirmed that the long-running Sonic the Hedgehog comic book series will be discontinued after their final issue in December 2016 as Archie ended their partnership with Sega, as well as poor reception with the retconned continuity from Ken Penders' departure.

=== August ===
- August 21: Nero receives a comics mural in Middelkerke, Belgium, as part of the local Comic Book Route.

=== September ===
- September 21: The final episode of Aloys Oosterwijk's gag comic Willems Wereld is published.
- September 23: The first Ringo Awards are handed out, voted by comics professionals and fans.
- September 26: Jean-Marc van Tol, John Reid and Bastiaan Geleijnse win the Inktspotprijs for Best Political Cartoon.

=== October ===
- October 12: Margreet de Heer is elected as first Dutch Stripmaker des Vaderlands (Comics Laureate of the Netherlands) for a period of three years.
- October 13: Tubbs Fire: during a fire in Santa Rosa, California, the house of late Peanuts creator Charles M. Schulz burns down to the ground. His widow is saved.

=== November ===
- November 2–3: Second annual WES Feminist Comic Con held in Pakistan.
- November 10–12: Rhode Island Comic Con (Rhode Island Convention Center, Providence, Rhode Island)

=== December ===
- December 17: Iranian cartoonist Ali Dorani, better known as Eaten Fish, is finally released from his detention in a refugee camp in Manus Island, where he spent five years. By making comics and cartoons about his imprisonment, which were smuggled out the camp, he was able to bring international attention to his case, which led to sympathy campaigns that eventually solidified his release.
- December 18: Geneviève Gautier publishes her comic book Les Aventures du Pingouin Alfred. The event receives a lot of media attention since, at age 95, she is the oldest person to ever publish a comic book.

=== Specific date unknown ===
- Amby Vaingankar launches her webcomic series AmbyComics, also known as Gotta Sketch 'Em All.
- Esther González launches her webcomic series Miss Pad Thai.
- Gary Panter releases the graphic novel Songy of Paradise.
- Mimi Pond's graphic novel The Customer is Always Wrong is published.

== Deaths ==
=== January ===
- January 1: Alfonso Wong, Chinese comics artist and animator (Old Master Q), dies at the age of 93.
- January 12: Gerry Gersten, American caricaturist and comics artist (Mad Magazine), dies at age 89.
- January 15: Jean-Luc Vernal, Belgian comics writer (Jugurtha, Ian Kaledine, Tetfol, Brelan de dames, Cranach de Morganloup) and chief editor of Tintin magazine (1977–1988), dies at the age of 72.
- January 17: Pascal Garray, Belgian comics artist (worked for Studio Peyo on new albums by The Smurfs and Benoît Brisefer), dies at age 51.
- January 17: Pascal J. Zanon, Belgian comics artist (Harry Dickson), dies at age 73.
- January 18: Raoul Giordan, French comics artist and half of the Giordan Brothers (Franck Nevil, Tom Tempest, the space family Les Francis, Bob Corton, Vigor and Thierry), dies at age 90.
- January 19: Jan Kruis, Dutch comics artist (Jan, Jans en de Kinderen (Jack, Jacky and the Juniors), dies at the age of 83.
- January 21: John Watkiss, British comics artist (The Sandman, Deadman, Conan the Barbarian), dies of cancer at the age of 55.
- January 25: Jack Mendelsohn, American comics writer, artist (Jacky's Diary) and TV script writer, dies at the age of 90 from lung cancer.
- January 21: Alessandro Biffignandi, Italian illustrator, comics, magazine cover and film poster artist (Rombo Bill, Flambo, Antonin, Agent Special K3, Sergeant Fury), dies at the age of 81.
- January 28: Dan Spiegle, American comics artist (Dell Comics, DC Comics, Marvel Comics), dies at age 96.
- January 28: Joop Wiggers, Dutch comics artist, lay-out designer, entrepreneur and publisher (business associate of Jan Kruis), dies at age 82.

=== February ===
- February 11: Jiro Taniguchi, Japanese manga artist (A Distant Neighborhood), dies at age 69.
- February 15: Fabrizio Busticchi, Italian comics artist (Allan Quatermain comics series, Mister No), dies at the age of 63.
- February 16: Dick Bruna, Dutch children's novelist and illustrator (Miffy), died at age 89.
- February 18: Giacomo Pueroni, Italian comics artist (Jonathan Steele, Harry Moon, Nathan Never, Anjce), dies at age 53.

=== March ===
- March 5: Dave Hunt, American comics artist (DC Comics, Marvel Comics, Disney comics, Hanna-Barbera), dies from cancer at age 74.
- March 5: Jay Lynch, American underground comix artist and writer (Nard n' Pat, Phoebe and the Pigeon People, Bazooka Joe) and editor of the magazine Bijou Funnies, dies at age 72.
- March 12: Murray Ball, New Zealand cartoonist and comics artist (Stanley the Palaeolithic Hero, Footrot Flats), dies at age 78.
- March 12: Stavro Jabra, Lebanese political cartoonist and comics artist, dies at age 70.
- March 16: Skip Williamson, American underground comix artist (Snappy Sammy Smoot), dies at the age of 72.
- March 17: Joost Rietveld, Dutch illustrator and comics artist (comics for the children's magazines Olidin and Okki), dies at age 85.
- March 18: Bernie Wrightson, American comics artist (Bernie Wrightson's Frankenstein, House of Mystery, House of Secrets, co-creator of Swamp Thing), dies at age 68.
- March 21: Gerard Wiegel, Dutch comics artist, illustrator and cartoonist (Professor Cumulus, Flossie, Conny, Tiep, Professor Vliegop, Kimo), dies at the age of 89.
- March 26: Chen Uen, Taiwanese comics artist, dies at age 58.
- March 27: Leone Cimpellin, Italian comics artist (Jonny Logan, Maxmagnus, Plutos, Red Carson, Papero grosso e Fiorello, Gibernetta, Carletto Sprint, Tribunzio, Gigi Bizz, Gianni & Rob-8, Gelsomino, Tam Tam, Nero Fumo, Tom Patapom, Tchak), dies at the age of 91.
- March 29: Knut Westad, Norwegian comic artist (Tåkehauk, Tigalo, worked on The Phantom), dies at age 61.

=== April ===
- April 9: Carolyn Kelly, American comics artist, animator and book designer (continued Pogo), dies at age 68.
- April 10: Chris Roodbeen, Dutch comics artist, illustrator, cartoonist and courtroom artist (Ahmed, De Roemrijke Avonturen van Papom), dies at the age of 87.
- April 15: Martin Greim, American comics writer and artist (Thunderbunny), dies from heart failure at age 74.
- April 23: Leo Baxendale, British comics artist (Little Plum, Minnie the Minx, The Bash Street Kids, The Three Bears, Grimly Feendish, Sweeny Toddler, Willy the Kid), dies at the age of 86.
- April 27: Peter Spier, Dutch writer and illustrator, dies at age 89.
- April 30: Jidéhem, Belgian comics artist (Sophie), dies at the age of 81.
- Specific date unknown: Norberto Firpo, a.k.a. Ácido Nítrico, Argentine journalist and cartoonist (Olegario, Furgon de Cola), dies at age 85.

=== May ===
- May 2: Jay Disbrow, American comics artist, writer, illustrator and lecturer (Blue Bolt Weird Tales of Terror, Spook, Ghostly Weird Stories, Daring Adventures, Eerie Tales, The Flames of Gyro, Aroc of Zenith), dies at the age of 91.
- May 13: James Dale Cavanaugh, American comics store owner (owned Clint's Comics in Kansas City since 1975), dies at age 66 or 67 after being killed trying to stop a shoplifter.
- May 18: Oscar González Guerrero, Mexican comics artist (co-creator of Zor y Los Invencibles and Hermelinda Linda), dies at age 95.
- May 19: Rich Buckler, American comics artist (Deathlok the Demolisher, All-Star Squadron), dies from cancer at the age of 68.
- May 21: Larry Wright, American comics artist (Kit 'N' Carlyle, Wright Angles, Uncle Milton, Motley), dies at age 77.
- May 24: Pierre Seron, Belgian comics artist (Les Petits Hommes), dies at age 75.
- May 25: Marcello Albano, Italian comics artist, writer and musician, dies at age 65.

=== June ===
- June 1: Vic Lockman, American comics artist (Disney comics, Looney Tunes comics, Hanna-Barbera comics, Christian comics), dies at age 89.
- June 4: Rob Gorter, Dutch comics artist, caricaturist and illustrator (Japie, Chris Crack, co-creator of Toon en Toos Brodeloos, Buro Moeilijke Zaken), dies at 71.
- June 5: James Vance, American comics writer (Kings in Disguise), dies of cancer at age 64.
- June 10: Malang Santos, Philippine painter, cartoonist and comics artist (Kosme the Cop, Chain Gang Charlie, Beelzebub), dies at age 89.
- June 18: Carlos Prunés, Spanish comics artist (Fleetway Comics), dies at age 79.
- June 19: Gordon Livingstone, British comics artist (worked for Commando), dies at age 82.
- June 30: Barry Norman, British film critic and comics writer (wrote some scripts for Flook), dies at age 83.

=== July ===
- July 6: Juan Carlos Colombres, a.k.a. Landru, Argentine comics artist and cartoonist, dies at age 94.
- July 6: Galip Tekin, Turkish comics artist (Tuhaf Öyküler, Pı'ya Mektuplar), dies at age 59.
- July 8: Bob Lubbers, American comics artist (Long Sam, Robin Malone, made a comic strip based on The Saint, assisted/continued Tarzan, Secret Agent X-9, Li'l Abner), dies at age 95.
- July 10: Mangesh Tendulkar, Indian cartoonist dies at age 83 from bladder cancer.
- July 12: Sam Glanzman, American comics artist (Hercules, The Lonely War of Willy Schultz, U.S.S. Stevens), dies at the age of 92.
- July 15: Martin Landau, American film and TV actor and cartoonist (continued The Gumps), dies at age 89.
- July 23: Flo Steinberg, American underground comics publisher (Big Apple Comix) and secretary of Stan Lee, dies at age 78 from a brain aneurysm and metastatic lung cancer.
- July 27: Stan Hart, American comics writer and TV comedy script writer (Mad Magazine), dies.

=== August ===
- August 3: Pavel Kantorek, Czech cartoonist, illustrator and natural scientist, professor of physics, dies at age 75.
- August 6: Dick Locher, American comics artist and cartoonist (continued Dick Tracy), dies at the age of 88.
- August 8: Rius, Mexican comics artist (Los Supermachos, Los Agachados, Marx for Beginners, Cuba for Beginners), dies at the age of 83.
- August 11: Lengkuas, Malaysian cartoonist, dies at age 53.
- August 14: Álvaro de Moya, Brazilian comics artist, journalist, TV producer, professor and comics scholar, dies at age 86 or 87.
- August 18: Alfonso Azpiri, Spanish comics artist (Lorna, Mot), dies at age 70.
- August 18: Sergio Zaniboni, Italian comics artist (Diabolik, Speedy Car), dies at age 80.
- August 21: Michel Plessix, French comics artist (Julien Boisvert, Le Vent dans les Saules, Le Vent dans les Sables), dies from a heart attack at age 57.
- August 28: Bert Bus, Dutch comics artist (Olaf Noord, Theban de Eerste Wereldreiziger, Cliff Rendall, Stef Ardoba, Malorix, Russ Bender), dies at age 86.
- August 30: Roger Subirachs y Burgaya, a.k.a. Roger, Spanish comics artist (Vaselín Piula, Emili Piula, Destino Gris, Roberto Ruina), dies at age 60.
- August 31: Jan Romare, Swedish diplomat and comics artist (Ur Igelkotten Huberts Dagbok, Gorilla Gusten, Mullvalden Malte, Ugglan Urban, Pyton, Himlens änglar), dies at age 81.

=== September ===
- September 1: Barry Liebmann, American comedy and comics writer (Mad Magazine, Looney Tunes comics), dies at age 63.
- September 10: Len Wein, American comics writer (co-creator of Wolverine and Swamp Thing), dies at age 69.
- September 12: Bob Moyer, American painter and comics artist (continued Ticklers and Mac), dies at age 93.
- September 27: Hugh Hefner, American magazine publisher, chief editor and cartoonist (Playboy, Trump), dies at age 91.

=== October ===
- October 12: Erwin Moser, Austrian illustrator, novelist and comics artist (Manuel & Didi), dies at age 63.
- October 25: Patrick Jusseaume, French comics artist (Chronique de la Maison le Quéant, Tramp), dies at age 65.

=== November ===
- November 5: Renzo Calegari, Italian comics artist (Storia del West), dies at age 84.
- November 22: Irvin Shope, American painter and comic artist (Rusty Rawlins, Cowboy), dies at age 77.
- November 27: Bob van den Born, Dutch comics artist and cartoonist (Professor Pi), dies at age 90.
- November 29: Fran Hopper, American comics artist (worked for Fiction House), dies at age 95.

=== December ===
- December 5; Carlos Casalla, Argentinian comic artist (El Cabo Savino), dies at age 90.
- December 6:
  - Yves Ker Ambrun, French comics artist (Gaspard le Lézard, Schecksnyder), dies at age 63.
  - Jim Watson, British comic artist (drew war comics for Battle Picture Weekly and Commando), dies at age 85.
- December 7: Alain d'Orange, French comic artist (Marc Leloup, various biographical-historical comics), dies at age 94.
- December 19: Lona Rietschel, German comics artist (Abrafaxe), dies at age 84.
- December 20: Annie Goetzinger, French comics artist and illustrator (Félina, Aurore, La Demoiselle de la Légion d'honneur, Agence Hardy), dies at age 66.
- December 29: Jim Baikie, British comics artist (Judge Dredd, Skizz, Jinty), dies at age 77.

== Exhibitions ==
- October 27–November 12: "Contar o Mundo: Reportagem em Banda Desenhada" (“Tell the World: Comics Reportage“) (Fórum Luís de Camões, Amadora, Portugal) — comics journalism exhibition featuring the work of Joe Sacco, Josh Neufeld, and Ted Rall, among others; part of Amadora BD

== Conventions ==
- March 11–12: Big Apple Comic Con (Penn Plaza Pavilion, New York City) — comics guests: Jim Lee, Neal Adams, Jon Bernthal, Guy Dorian, Jason David Frank, Kathy Garver, Michael Golden, Neil Kaplan, Frank Miller, Arthur Suydam, Mark Texeira, Billy Tucci, Spencer Wilding, Renée Witterstaetter; Stan Lee cancelled due to illness
- March 25–26: Small Press and Alternative Comics Expo (S.P.A.C.E.) (Northland Performing Arts Center, Columbus, Ohio)
- April 1–2: MoCCA Festival (Metropolitan West, New York City)
- April 29: FLUKE Mini-Comics & Zine Festival (40 Watt, Athens, Georgia)
- May 20: East Coast Black Age of Comics Convention (ECBACC) (TECH Freire Charter School, Philadelphia, Pennsylvania)
- June 10–11: Chicago Alternative Comics Expo [CAKE] (Center on Halsted, Chicago, Illinois) — special guests: Gabrielle Bell, Gary Panter, Ron Regé Jr., Kevin Budnik, Emil Ferris, Jesse Jacobs, Ben Passmore, C. Spike Trotman, Jessi Zabarsky
- September 9–10: STAPLE! (Millennium Youth Entertainment Complex, Austin, Texas)
- September 16–17: Small Press Expo (SPX) (Bethesda North Marriott Hotel & Conference Center, North Bethesda, Maryland)
- September 23–24: Thought Bubble Festival (Victoria Hall, exhibition structures outside Leeds Town Hall, Cookridge Street, and Millennium Square, Leeds, England) — guests include Charlie Adlard, Antony Johnston, Gerard Way, Brian K. Vaughan, Jody Houser, Sara Pichelli, Sarah Graley, Alex Norris, Ariela Kristantina, Hannah Berry, Kieron Gillen, and Jamie McKelvie
- September 28–October 1: Cartoon Crossroads Columbus (Columbus, Ohio) – special guests Derf Backderf, Kat Fajardo, Laura Park, Kelly Sue DeConnick, Nilah Magruder, Ann Nocenti
- October 21-22: Massachusetts Independent Comics Expo [MICE] (Lesley's University Hall, Porter Square, Cambridge, Massachusetts) — guests include Kazu Kibuishi, Michael DeForge, and Isabel Greenberg; exhibitors include Josh Neufeld
- November 2–4: International Comic Arts Forum (University of Washington, Seattle, Washington) — guests include Jesús Cossio, Kelly Sue DeConnick, Ramzi Fawaz, Emil Ferris, Gary Groth, Moto Hagio, Nick Sousanis, and Jim Woodring
- November 11: Comic Arts Brooklyn (CAB) (Pratt Institute, Brooklyn, New York) — special guests Alexis Beauclair, Charles Burns, DDOOGG, Jules Feiffer, Emil Ferris, Sophie Goldstein, Bill Griffith, Paul Karasik, Peter Kuper, Miss Lasko-Gross, Jane Mai, Mark Newgarden, Patrick Kyle, Richie Pope, Nicole Rifkin, Simon Hanselmann, Adrian Tomine, Chris Ware, Lale Westvind, Eric Kostiuk Williams, Ron Wimberly, Kelsey Wroten, Gina Wynbrandt
- December 9–10: Comic Arts Los Angeles (Homenetmen Ararat, Glendale, California) — special guest: Michael DeForge

== First issues by title ==
Batman: The Dark Prince Charming
Released November by DC Comics. Writer & Artist: Enrico Marini
Lazarus X+66
Released July by Image Comics. Writer: Greg Rucka Artist: Steve Lieber
Sleepless
Released November by Image Comics. Writer: Sarah Vaughn Artist: Leila del Duca
Spencer & Locke
Released April by Action Lab Comics. Writer: David Pepose Artist: Jorge Santiago, Jr.
Tomb Raider: Survivor's Crusade
Released November by Dark Horse Comics. Writers: Collin Kelly and Jackson Lanzing Artist: Ashley A. Woods
X-Men Blue
Released April by Marvel Comics. Writer: Cullen Bunn Artist: Jorge Molina
X-Men Gold
Released April by Marvel Comics. Writer: Marc Guggenheim Artist: Ardian Syaf
