= Han Peekel =

Dutch singer and presenter (1947–2022)

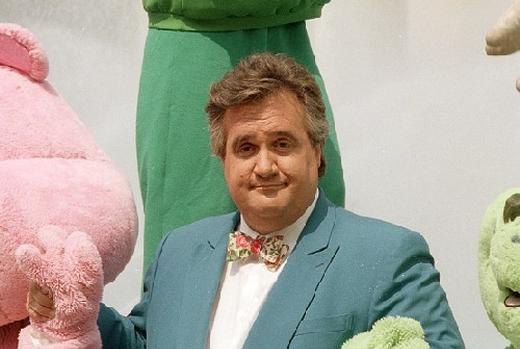
- Born: 6 October 1947; Rotterdam, Netherlands
- Died: 14 December 2022 (aged 75); Sanur, Indonesia
- Occupations: Television producer and television presenter

Han Peekel (6 October 1947 – 14 December 2022) was a Dutch television producer, writer, radio- and television presenter. He was best known as presenter of television programs as Wordt Vervolgd and TV Monument. Peekel also produced television shows and wrote books.

== Biography ==
Peekel started in the 1960s as a singer of Dutch songs and was presenter at Radio Veronica. He became known for his television appearances. The television program Wordt Vervolgd about comics and cartoons started in 1983 and Peekel presented the program for seventeen years. Peekel also collaborated with Wouter Strips and Joop Wiggers on a TV adaptation of Jan Kruis' Jack, Jacky and the Juniors.

From 2009 he was the presenter of TV Monument, a documentary TV series about Dutch TV makers.

On 18 December 2012, Peekel became Knight of the Order of Orange-Nassau for his services to television, radio and cabaret. He received the award from the mayor of Hilversum Pieter Broertjes.

Peekel died of heart failure during a holiday in Sanur at the Indonesian island Bali on 14 December 2022, at the age of 75.

== Comic cameo appearances ==
Peekel had a cameo appearance in the comics

- As a colleague of Jan Tromp in album 12 of Jack, Jacky and the Juniors.
- As a courtier at the court of Maximilian I, Holy Roman Emperor in the Spike and Suzy album De kleine postruiter.
