= Geech =

Geech may refer to:

- Ian McGeechan (born 1946), Scottish rugby union footballer
- Geech (comic strip), an American comic strip that ran from 1982 to 2003
- Geech, a comic book supervillain and adversary of the X-Men, who appeared in Uncanny X-Men #451 (December 2004)
