= The Unchallengable Daitarn 3 =

Japanese anime television series

- 無敵鋼人ダイターン3
- Genre: Mecha
- Creators: Hajime Yatate; Yoshiyuki Tomino
- Director: Yoshiyuki Tomino (chief)
- Character designers: Norio Shioyama; Tomonori Kogawa
- Music: Takeo Watanabe; Yuji Matsuyama
- Country of origin: Japan
- Original language: Japanese
- No. of episodes: 40

Production
- Producers: Haruo Shibue (Nippon Sunrise); Nobuyuki Okuma (Sotsu Agency)
- Production companies: Nagoya TV; Sotsu Agency; Nippon Sunrise

Original release
- Networks: ANN (Nagoya TV, TV Asahi)
- Release: 3 June 1978 – 31 March 1979

Related
- Novel series

Haran Banjō Series
- Written by: Yoshiyuki Tomino
- Published by: Asahi Sonorama
- Imprint: Sonorama Bunko
- Original run: 1989 – 1992

The Unchallengable Daitarn 3 (Japanese: 無敵鋼人ダイターン3, Hepburn: Muteki Kōjin Daitān 3) is a Japanese anime television series produced by Nippon Sunrise.

Between 1989 and 1992, Tomino wrote several spin-off novels, which are collectively known as the Banjō Haran Series (破嵐万丈シリーズ, Haran Banjō Shirīzu; lit. 'Full Vent to the Winds of Destruction Series').

== Plot ==
Sōzō Haran was a brilliant scientist who was conducting research on Mars. He created a form of cyborg life with the ability to think for itself. These cyborgs, dubbed the Meganoids (メガノイド, Meganoido), soon ran out of control and killed Dr. Haran along with his whole family, save his youngest son, the 16-year-old Banjō Haran. Banjō escapes from Mars on a rocket with a solar-powered super robot called Daitarn 3, which was built with special Martian metals.

Now 18 years old and living on Earth in a luxurious mansion, Banjō fights against the Meganoids and their leader, Don Zauser and his second-in-command Koros, with the aid of his faithful butler Garrison, his two gorgeous companions, Reika and Beauty, and an orphan boy named Topo. Together they must stop the evil Meganoids, who aspire to turn all humans into cyborgs and thus "improve" the human race.

== History ==
Some of the staff fresh from Zambot 3 worked with Tomino on the Daitarn 3 project. The suave nature of the hero, Banjō Haran, was a direct attempt at capturing some of the spirit of the James Bond films, which can be seen in the fact almost as much action takes place with Banjo, Reika Sanjō (ex-Interpol agent) and Beautiful Tachibana (also called "Beauty") playing superspies as Banjō fighting against Meganoid robots in Daitarn 3. Other important characters were Garrison Tokida, Banjo's trusted butler, and Toppo, a comic relief-character who gets rescued from a Meganoid-hijacked city block in episode 2, and then stays with Banjō and company for no apparent reason.

There is a light comedic element running through the whole series – the Meganoid foot soldiers exert some of their own personality with banter, bringing a change to the silent drones which permeated super robot series previously.

== Characters ==
=== Main characters ===
- Banjō Haran (破嵐 万丈, Haran Banjō)
- Garrison Tokida (ギャリソン時田, Gyarison Tokida)
- Beautiful "Beauty" Tachibana (ビューティフル・タチバナ, Byūtifuru Tachibana)
- Reika Sanjō (三条 レイカ, Sanjō Reika)
- Toppo (Totta Toda) (トッポ（戸田 突太）, Toppo (Toda Totta))

=== Meganoids ===
- Don Zauser (ドン・ザウサー, Don Zausaa), also spelled Don Zauther, Don Zauker, and Don Zaucer.
- Koros (コロス, Korosu)

=== Other characters ===
- Sōzō Haran (破嵐創造, Haran Souzou)

== Daitarn 3 ==
- Height: 120 meters.
- Weight: 800 tons
- Power source: Solar energy-powered Pulse Ion Engine.

=== Weapons ===
- Daitarn Zanber: A pair of swords stored in the legs.
- Daitarn Fan: A pair of fans used to deflect enemy projectiles.
- Daitarn Javelin: A forked javelin stored in the left leg.
- Daitarn Hammer: A mace on a chain stored in the left leg.
- Daitarn Missile: Missiles launched from within the pelvis.
- Daitarn Snapper: A pair of grappling claws on hooks stored in the hips.
- Daitarn Web: The star on Daitarn 3's torso that can be used like a boomerang.
- Cross Dart: Energy nets stored in the hands.
- Sun Laser: A red solar laser from the forehead orb.
- Daitarn Cannon: A cannon in each foot.
- Daitarn Barrier: A solar powered force field.
- Sun Attack: This attack is usually followed by the "Daitarn Crash" (Daitarn finishes the enemy with a flying downward kick).
  - Sun Attack Scattershot: A modified version of the Sun Attack, which attacks at a weaker but wider arc capable of destroying large numbers of lesser enemies.

=== Alternate forms and vehicles ===
- Daifighter: Daitarn's plane/spaceship form, it can reach speeds of near light speed while in space. It is armed with rockets from the wings, a pair of missile launchers, twin lasers, and a powerful laser on the front called the Daitarn Laser. Length: 80 meters. Width: 50 meters. Max Speed: Mach 20.
- Daitank: As the name suggests, it is the tank-like form of Daitarn. Daitank is armed with a pair of cannons called the Double Cannon, a missile launcher on each side, and a shuriken called the Daitarn Web. Length: 80 meters.
- Mach Patrol: Banjō's police cruiser-like car which can transform into a plane resembles Ford Thunderbird MK6. When in plane form, it is referred to as the Mach Attacker. As Mach Attacker it has a pair of bladed wings called the Mach Blades and balloon-like mines from its rear called the Mach Balloons. As Mach Patrol it can release spikes called the Mach Picks and has a remote controlled box that contains firearms.

== Megaborg and Megaborg-like entities ==
- Sandrake: Appears in episode 1. Powers include a double sided mace, a pink electric ray from the abdomen, spike missiles from the shoulders, a whip on each arm, a sword in the right foot, and a spiked ball from the halves on his shoulders. Appears in Super Robot Wars Alpha 2.
- Neros: Appears in episode 2. Powers include a Chinese sword, a green laser from the right eye, levitation, shoulder missiles, shoulder sonic bombs, right wrist crescent blades, and a mouth flamethrower. Appears in Super Robot Wars Impact.
- Benmel: Appears in episode 3. Powers include punches called the Mega Smack, levitation, a separable double sided ax that can act as a boomerang when in half, and a missile launcher on each side of the head. Appears in various Super Robot Wars titles.
- Des Sander: Appears in episode 4. Powers include a solar powered beam from the scalp called the Death Beam and two grenade launchers on each wrist.
- Brandol: Appears in episode 5. Powers include dual shoulder cannons, launching his head and arm guns, levitation, machine guns all over his body, brick-like grenades, and using his head like a bomb.
- Aneval:
  - Aneval Form 1: Appears in episode 6. It is not really a megaborg as much as it is a mechanical synthetic lion used by Animad; it is later turned into a true megaborg.
  - Aneval Form 2: Appears in episode 6. Powers include levitation, pink eye sonic waves, paw missiles, a mouth flamethrower, and reinforced fangs. It appears in Super Robot Wars Compact 2 and Impact.
- Daston: Appears in episode 7. Powers include a double sided ax, levitation, and can teleport short distances. Appears in Super Robot Wars Impact.
- Jira: Appears in episode 8. Powers include a crystalline body, a crystal sword, and firing crystal shards from her torso.
- Franken: Appears in episode 9. He is not really a megaborg as he is instead a meganoid discipline director with a very tough body.
- Mettenger: Appears in episode 9. Powers include flight, claws, and a launchable drill from the foot. Much like Aneval it does not have a meganoid form. It also appeared in various Super Robot Wars titles with the added ability to release green lightning bolts from the mouth.
- Wong Law: Appears in episode 10. Powers include martial arts skills, nunchucks, speed, levitation, a Chinese sword, and a broadsword.
- Hessler. Appears in episode 11. Powers include toe and knee missiles, electrical surges from the treads on his shoulders, a tank cannon in each shoulder that can combine into a bazooka, and can use his tank treads as coiling tentacles.
- Nibelgun: Appears in episode 11 and was rebuilt in episode 34. It is not really a meganoid as much as it is a triple barreled tank created by Hessler. Powers include three main guns, thick armor, single barreled guns around the bottom, and three double barreled guns at the base of the main guns. Appears in various Super Robot Wars titles.
- Wenner: Appears in episode 12 and is rebuilt in episode 34. Powers include a missile launcher in each pectoral, emitting sonic waves that distort the brain via hypnosis, thirteen remote controlled discs that release flames from their mouth, and levitation.
- Donaun: Appears in episode 13. He is not a megaborg as he is a meganoid imperial guard. He also pilots a robot identical to Neros.
- Miragloa: Appears in episode 13. It is not really a megaborg as it is a 2,800-meter-tall (9,200 ft) carrier ship that produces an illusion field using the underside of its head and launchable "hands" that cause illusions and radio interference.
- Gildon: Appears in episode 14. Because he was killed off in his death battle by Koros under orders from Don Saucer his megaborg form is not shown.
- Jurabird: Appear in episode 14. They are not megaborg as they are actually three gigantic pteranadons buried beneath the Arctic with freezing breath.
- Zenoia: Appears in episode 15. Powers include extendable arms, slime-like tentacles from her waist, flight, probing fingers used to impale enemies in their body, a high resistance to radiation that allows her to resist normal Sun Attacks, red sonic waves from the eyes that can nullify dimensional barriers, and pink eye beams. Appears in Super Robot Wars R.
- Rad: Appears in episode 16. Powers include levitation, a sword, a round shield that launches red fire balls, using its mummy-like bandages to constrict, and energy surges from the body. Unlike other megaborgs it is formed from four meganoid soldiers rather than a single commander.
- Damdes: Appears in episode 17. Powers include yellow eye beams, body curved blades with launchable ones on the shoulders, dual chest missile launchers, levitation, flames from the forehead, using energy from his environment to dramatically increase his body temperature and allow him to resist radiation based attacks, and emitting electrical surges.
- Special First: Appears in episode 18. Powers include flight, a double tipped spear, an electric rope in the side of the spear with coiling abilities, and turning his body in an energy glob. He is not really a meganoid as much as he is a prototype cyborg commanded by Don Zauser.
- Buncher: Appears in episode 19 and was rebuilt in episode 34. Powers include throwing rods, emitting lightning from his back, launchable fists connected by energy, five rockets from the ring on his back, twin rockets disguised as head horns, and regeneration. At his disposal is a large killer saw called the Buttagirun, which appears in Super Robot Wars Alpha 2.
- Death Spider: Appears in episode 20. Powers include flight, lightning bolts from its three ant-like mouths, energy webs from the spinneret, and teleportation for escaping,
- Radik: Appears in episode 21. Powers include levitation, summoning flying buzzsaws from a set of clash cymbals, sharp head horns, and strength.
- Jimmy Dean (not to be confused for the celebrity of the same name): Appears in episode 22. Powers include flight, a broadsword, a comb that spawns star-like missiles and fires needle missiles, and a rose that can become gigantic and consume opponents.
- Jenoba: Appears in episode 23. Powers include homing lava balls from the fingers, summoning giant rock pillars, three remote devices that harvest lava from beneath the Earth's crust, flight, and mouth flames.
- Garu: Appears in episode 24. Powers include agility, needle missiles from the abdomen, a whip, nine missiles stored in the flap on his torso, an ax, and a large fan used to redirect spores.
  - Mutant Mushrooms: Appear in episode 24. Powers include acidic telepathic spores and consuming opponents alive. They are actually experiments created by Garu fueled by the energy within children he kidnaps that ironically destroy him.
- Katroff: Appears in episode 25. Powers include drills all over the body, projectile resistance, and head detachment.
- Magellan: Appears in episode 25. It is actually a large flying aircraft carrier used by Katroff that used artificial intelligence and went rogue. Its weapons included many double barreled turrets and a double barreled energy cannon strong enough to destroy islands and proved much stronger than Daitarn 3's Sun Attack.
- Mileena: Appears in episode 26. Powers include flight, a sword that fires pink bolts that cause mind control, a flamethrower in the pelvis, and constricting hair. Appears in various Super Robot Wars titles.
- Edwin: Appears in episode 27. Powers include a flying carpet, razor cards, a remote cape that emits pink electrical bolts that cause fissures, and a blinding light from his forehead. Appears in Super Robot Wars Reversal. Edwin has a brief cameo in his meganoid form in episode 14 of the original Mobile Suit Gundam.
- Beltori: Appears in episode 28. Powers include an ax, super sonic flight, and converting his body into a swarm of mechanical locusts. Appears in Super Robot Wars Reversal.
- Lisa: Appears in episode 29. Powers include finger electric bolts that can form into a net, twin orange head beams, levitation, spinning very fast, and fusing with Ica to form Giant Combined Megaborg who fires finger beams and a radiation cannon from the torso called the Twin Electron. Appears in Super Robot Wars A in both regular and combined forms.
- Ica: Appears in episode 29. Presumably has the same powers as Lisa. Appears in Super Robot Wars A.
- Mazoni: Appears in episode 30. Her only known power is a double sided spear.
- Zeta: Appears in episode 31. Powers include levitation, bladed discs from the fingers, energy blasts from her composite mirror, five restrainer rings, a redirecting purple energy barrier, and hypnosis from her eyes.
- Trays: Appears in episode 32. Appears in Super Robot Wars A. Powers include a pair of grenade launcher clubs, flight, and summoning kamikaze jets from his torso.
  - Panda Bot: Appears in episode 32. It can only tackle.
  - False Daitarn 3s: Appear in episode 32. They are actually 20 meter clones of Daitarn 3 that can only tackle. They appear in Super Robot Wars Impact.
- Doil: Appears in episode 33. Powers include torso missiles, a missile launcher on each wrist, a pair of pendulum blades on each end of a chain, a broadsword, and super sonic flight.
- Anton: Appears in episode 34. He pilots a robot similar to Wong Law.
- Jiraiya: Appears in episode 35. Powers include a scythe, a large frog with an extendable tongue, a mouth flamethrower, and radiation neutralizing purple acid, and strong breath.
- Phroid, Jaruki, and Taimer: Appear in episode 36 and fuse into one megaborg. Powers include levitation, wrist swords, throwing stars from the mouth of the torso face that emit green electricity, a rocky body, and six swords in each of its three faces.
- Kidowa: Appears in episode 37. Powers include levitation, six swords, a double sided spear, and agility. Appears in Super Robot Wars Alpha 2.
- Blue Bird of Happiness: It is actually a cosmic entity and appears in episode 38. Powers include space flight, teleportation, and a body made of electromagnetic pulses.
- Ume, Take, and Matsu: Appear in episode 38 and fuse into one megaborg called Kouh Sei. Powers include space flight, six arms, green energy bolts from the fingers, laser chains from the wrists, and emitting electrical surges.
- Robot Dinosaurs: Appear in episode 39 and are actually robots used by Nedol. They are each armed with a weapon such as a mace, an ax, or a large flyswatter.
- Nendol: Appears in episode 39. Powers include a highly elastic body, levitation, a 3-tube missile launcher in the left pectoral, and regeneration. Appears in Super Robot Wars R.

== Media ==
=== Novels ===
No.	Title	Author	Publisher	Date	ISBN
1	Haran Banjo War of the roses (破嵐万丈 薔薇戦争)	Yoshiyuki Tomino	Asahi Sonorama	May 1987	9784257010012
2	Haran Banjo Melancholy Museum (破嵐万丈 憂鬱ミュージアム)	Yoshiyuki Tomino	Asahi Sonorama	May 1989	9784257764724
3	Haran Banjo Hit Couple (破嵐万丈 ヒット・カップル)	Yoshiyuki Tomino	Asahi Sonorama	July 1989	9784257764830
4	Haran Banjo From Siberia with Love (破嵐万丈 愛はシベリアから)	Yoshiyuki Tomino	Asahi Sonorama	January 1992	9784257765837

=== Video games ===
Daitarn 3 has made appearances in many Super Robot Wars titles. Daitarn has also appeared in the Harobots series alongside its predecessor, Zambot 3, being able to perform a combination attack with it in some of the games.

Banjo himself has been a significant character is many of the Super Robot Wars titles. One of the most notable appearances was in Super Robot Wars Z2 Saisei-hen where he manages to prevent the death of Shirley Fenette from Code Geass should the player gather enough "Zero points" throughout the game.

In Super Robot Wars V, Banjo reveals that Hokushin, the main villain of Martian Successor Nadesico: Prince of Darkness, is the last living Meganoid.
