= Andrea Kruis =

Dutch comics artist

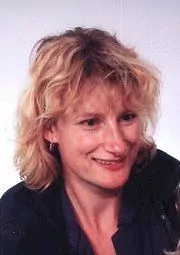
- Born: 22 October 1962 (age 64) Rotterdam, Netherlands
- Area: Artist

Andrea Kruis (born 22 October 1962 in Rotterdam) is a Dutch comics artist. She attended the Minerva Art Academy in Groningen. She illustrated several children's books. Starting in 1991 she creates comics for weekly magazines. Her first book was published in 1998.

She followed the footsteps of her father Jan Kruis, best known for his one-page comic Jan, Jans en de Kinderen (Jack, Jacky & the Juniors). Catootje, the younger bespectacled half of the two daughters, is modelled after Andrea. Her work, although visibly influenced by her father, is softer and more minimalistic than his efforts.

== Bibliography ==
Strips

- 15½ in Margriet (a Dutch magazine).
- Sammie & Muis in Tina (a Dutch magazine).
- Keetje en Waf-Waf in Bobo (a Dutch magazine).
- Grietje in a Groningen newspaper.
- Snuitje in LEGO-books.

Books

- 1998: De kinderen van de Karekiet
