= The Sarcophagi of the Sixth Continent, Volume 2: Battle of the Minds =

The Sarcophagi of the Sixth Continent, Volume 2: Battle of the Minds (Les Sarcophages du Sixième Continent, Tome 2: Le Duel des Esprits)
- Cover to the French-language edition
- Date: October 2004
- Series: Blake and Mortimer

Creative team
- Writers: Yves Sente
- Artists: André Juillard

Original publication
- Language: French

Translation
- Publisher: Cinebook Ltd
- Date: April 2011
- ISBN: 9781849180771
- Translator: Jerome Saincantin

Chronology
- Preceded by: The Sarcophagi of the Sixth Continent, Volume 1: The Universal Threat
- Followed by: The Gondwana Shrine

The Sarcophagi of the Sixth Continent, Volume 2: Battle of the Minds is the seventeenth Blake and Mortimer book in the series.

== Plot ==
Blake, Mortimer and Nasir land at Cape Town, South Africa, where they miss the departure of the ship La Madeleine. Fortunately, Lord Auchentosham, billionaire protector of nature, offers them to join the boat with his seaplane. Once aboard the ship, the three friends explain the reason for their presence to Labrousse. In order to intercept the package of uranium to Singh, they believe Ravi Kuta that their ship was immobilized by the storm of the day before and that they have a serious injury requiring care. Nasir boards the Indian cargo and sabotages its engines, allowing Blake and Mortimer to arrive first at the British Halley base. A radio exchange between the captain of La Madeleine shows the arrival of the British two to Acoka, who orders his men to assault the Halley base.

The next day, Blake and Mortimer land at the base where they are captured by the Indians. Blake manages to escape by dog sled and wanders in a blizzard to the Soviet base. While Major Varitch is about to kill him for pure vengeance, Blake flees on a freighter and joins the French base. Thanks to the invention of the Pr. Labrousse, the Subglacior, the French free their British colleagues. All together, they go to storm the Indian base. Meanwhile, Mortimer takes the Indian base where Acoka explains the functioning of his weapon and tells him that he will be the second guinea pig after Olrik. As he is preparing to enter the sarcophagus, Nasir, until then hidden under the guise of Singh, intervenes. At the same time, the Subglacior emerges in the base, causing a shootout, won by the French and British. Acoka and Radjak take refuge in an electromagnetic cage with Mortimer and Nasir, while earthquakes due to the Central Indian Ridge multiply.

The power supply to the base provided by the Soviets, Blake returns to their base to try and reason with them. In the tunnel he burrows, he convinces Major Varitch's lieutenant, killed by a collapse, to cut the current. In Indian base, a new earthquake plunges Acoka into a fault and seriously injures Radjak. While Labrousse repairs the damaged Subglacior, Radjak explained to Mortimer what Acoka criticized. In India, his love of the Princess Gita made Sushil, his childhood friend, jealous. The night where the two lovers were to meet, he killed the Princess in anger and pretended to Acoka that Mortimer was the murderer. Radjak eventually confessed the truth to his master who executed Sushil. Farmers found the Princess who had survived and Acoka decided to hide the truth, believing it was Mortimer who wanted to kill her. One day, Acoka returned alone, changed from a trip with his daughter. Mortimer then understands that Acoka is actually the Princess Gita.

The Princess reappears and threatens to kill Nasir if the British turn on the current. Once done, she sends the spirit of Olrik to sabotage the Expo but allows Mortimer to use the second sarcophagus if he wants to stop him. Mortimer finds himself in the form of electromagnetic waves in Brussels where he engages with Olrik, but he has a plan: while Labrousse distracts Gita at the base, the two enemies, who made a truce, joined their bodies. The Princess, furious, runs to Nasir to kill him but the Professor shoots her several times.

A new earthquake causes the collapse of the entire base. Mortimer and Nasir Labrousse have just enough time to escape on board the Subglacior, leaving Olrik, but they find themselves crushed by a rock needle over a pile of lava. A big explosion projects them outside where they are stranded on an ice floe. Thanks to the transmitter in the possession of Mortimer, Lord Auchentosham's seaplane manages to locate them. The protagonists gather on La Madeleine to debrief their adventure. On 17 April 1958, Blake, Mortimer and Labrousse are present at the inauguration of the Exposition by the King of the Belgians, Baudouin. In the old Indian Antarctic base, Olrik wakes up in his sarcophagus.

== English publication ==
The first publication in English was by Cinebook Ltd in April 2011.
