= Fokke & Sukke =

Dutch comic strip

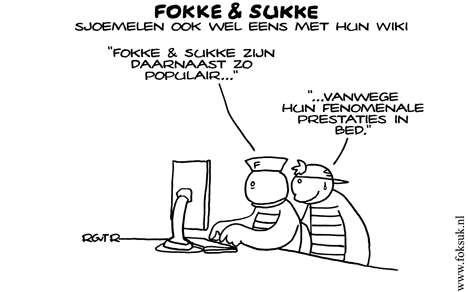
Fokke (left), wearing a sailor's cap, and Sukke (right), wearing a baseball cap backwards. Translation: "Fokke and Sukke also occasionally monkey around with their wiki", first published on 30 August 2007: Fokke: "Another reason for Fokke & Sukke's popularity ..." Sukke: "...is their phenomenal performance in the bedroom."

Fokke & Sukke is a Dutch comic strip created by writer and illustrator Jean-Marc van Tol, and writers John Reid and Bastiaan Geleijnse. The strip is published in the daily newspaper NRC Handelsblad. It has also appeared in other publications.

Fokke & Sukke first appeared in December 1993, in the Dutch student magazine Propria Cures. The one-panel comic, usually featuring humor of a politically incorrect nature, became very popular in the Netherlands. The strip has since appeared in numerous Dutch language publications, as well as over a dozen compilations. In 2003, Fokke & Sukke were awarded the Stripschapprijs, the Netherlands’ premier cartoon award.

The comic strip stars are Fokke, a duck wearing a small sailor's cap, and Sukke, a canary bird wearing a backwards baseball cap. In the tradition of Donald Duck and Porky Pig, neither of them wear pants. Not in the tradition, however, their genitals are clearly (and consistently) shown - sometimes even when they are wearing pants.

In 2006, the strip began to appear in English speaking countries under the title "Duck and Birdie." While the creators have pointed out that "Fokke" and "Sukke" are ordinary West Frisian-language names, they decided to avoid unnecessary controversy and use a name that would not be so easily misunderstood.

As of 1 May 2009, Fokke & Sukke have also started a career in German, appearing daily on the German news website DNews as 'Fokke & Sokke'.
