= The Gondwana Shrine =

The Gondwana Shrine (Le sanctuaire du Gondwana)
- Cover to the French-language edition
- Date: 28 March 2008
- Series: Blake and Mortimer

Creative team
- Writers: Yves Sente
- Artists: André Juillard

Original publication
- Language: French

Translation
- Publisher: Cinebook Ltd
- Date: September 2011
- ISBN: 9781849180948
- Translator: Jerome Saincantin

Chronology
- Preceded by: The Sarcophagi of the Sixth Continent, Volume 2: Battle of the Minds
- Followed by: The Curse of the Thirty Denarii

The Gondwana Shrine is the eighteenth Blake and Mortimer comic book in the series. The book was published in France and Belgium on March 28, 2008.

== Plot ==
In Tanganyika, Professor Heidegang discovers in the lake of the Ngorongoro crater a secret entrance leading to a sort of sanctuary. He seizes a ring as proof of his discovery but menacing men appear and he flees, wounded in the thigh. In London, professor Philip Mortimer, fatigued and suffering from memory problems since his experience in the sarcophagi of Açoka, is recommended by his doctor to rest. Nastasia Wardynska, of the CSIR, brings the results of the analysis of the rock he brought back from Antarctica: it is a 350 million year old gold and diamond rock on which is engraved enigmatic signs that would prove the existence of a civilization at that time.

At the Centaur Club, Mortimer shares his discoveries with his friend Captain Francis Blake, who had to go to France to meet Professor Labrousse, their French meteorologist friend, about his invention, Subglacior II. Mortimer goes to the Daily Mail archives where Mr Stone shows him an article on Dr. Heidegang that says paleontologists Mr and Mrs Leaky had been found delusional and clasping in their hands a ring engraved with the same enigmatic signs. On his return home, Mortimer immerses himself in reading his memories and discovers that the writer and amateur archaeologist Sarah Summertown, with whom he had an adventure in his youth, is a friend of the Leakys. In the archives of the Daily Mail, a mysterious man manages to consult the article on Prof. Heidegang by posing as Mortimer's assistant to Mr Stone. The next day, Mortimer goes to Sarah Summertown for the first time in many years. After having told each other their lives, Sarah agrees to help Mortimer on the condition that she accompany him on her adventure, and later Nastasia imposes her presence on him too.

At the London airport, Mortimer, Sarah and Nastasia board for Nairobi under the surveillance of the mysterious man. In the plane, Sarah talks to them of artifacts engraved with the same enigmatic signs found in the four corners of the world, which could indicate the existence of a civilization at the time of the unique continent of Gondwana. In London, the mysterious man enters Blake's house during the night and threatens the captain with a pistol. He just asks him to listen to what he has to say and gives him his gun as a pledge of good faith. The next day, Blake takes the plane and goes to Antarctica with Professor Labrousse to take a delivery of a mysterious cargo. Meanwhile, the mysterious man is handed a passport, a plane ticket to Nairobi and cash by David Honeychurch, who has received these instructions from his superior Blake. Arriving at his destination, he settles in the same hotel as Mortimer and his two friends, and turns out to be Colonel Olrik in disguise. Meanwhile, Mortimer, Sarah and Nastasia are in the hospital to visit the delirious Dr. Heidegang. Mortimer manages to make contact with Heidegang by speaking German and learns that the guardians of Gondwana demand that the ring be returned to them.

The three friends fly to Arusha, accompanied by Olrik in disguise who has managed to be invited by Nastasia. They find their guide Bombo, with whom they leave the next day in an all-terrain car for the crater of the Ngorongoro. Meanwhile, Olrik helps Uru, a young Maasai at the market, which causes him to fall into a trap. He is recognized by Razul the Bezendjas, his former henchman, who convinces him to team up to share the riches of the lost civilization of Gondwana. With the airship of Youssef, another former accomplice of Olrik, the three criminals can follow without being seen from the car carrying Motimer, Sarah, Nastasia, Bombo and Uru. When crossing a river, Nastasia falls into the water and is carried by the current to a bank downstream where she finds herself facing a lion. Uru, who has followed, fights the lion and eventually kills it before succumbing to his wounds. The young woman now faces a pack of African wild dogs and is saved by shots fired from an airship where she recognizes Olrik without believing it. Mortimer, Sarah and Bombo finally arrive at Nastasia after escaping the charge of a herd of elephants and the overthrow of their car. That evening, they attend the funeral of Uru in his village.

The next day, Mortimer, Sarah, Nastasia and Bombo arrive at the Ngorongoro crater and plunge into the lake to find the secret entrance, not knowing that Olrik and Razul are right behind them. The four adventurers enter the sanctuary where they are quickly encircled by threatening guards, only protected by the ring. A translucent disc called Life tells them that they are in the Sanctuary of Life and then invites them to come forward to discover it. They find themselves in a huge room with an extraordinary machine and Life explains to them: more than 300 million years ago, a civilization developed like theirs, but before the tensions engendered by growing injustices, scientists created an incubator to spawn new individuals if humanity were to disappear, which eventually happened. Olrik and Razul appear and threaten Mortimer, Sarah, Nastasia and Bombo with their weapons. Olrik makes an astonishing revelation: since their experience of the Açoka sarcophagi, Mortimer's body is controlled by the spirit of Olrik while the spirit of Mortimer is stuck in the body of the criminal. The proof is Mortimer's signature, which is related to the mind and not the body. This revelation leads to confusion among the protagonists who no longer know whom to believe and threaten each other. Faced with this distressing spectacle, Life decides to send them back to the outside world, having erased their memory of the place in order to protect the incubator.

On the shore of the lake, Olrik (in the body of Mortimer) is arrested by Captain Blake whom Mortimer (in Olrik's body) had convinced of his good faith in London. All of them board the seaplane of Lord Archibald Mac Auchentoshan, a billionaire protector of nature, which carries the Açoka sarcophagi found by Professor Labrousse in the ruins of the Indian Antarctic base. Mortimer thus regains his own body and proves it thanks to his writing. The sarcophagi are then thrown into the sea, never to be found again.

== English publication ==
The first publication in English was by Cinebook Ltd in September 2011.
