= Mantinge =

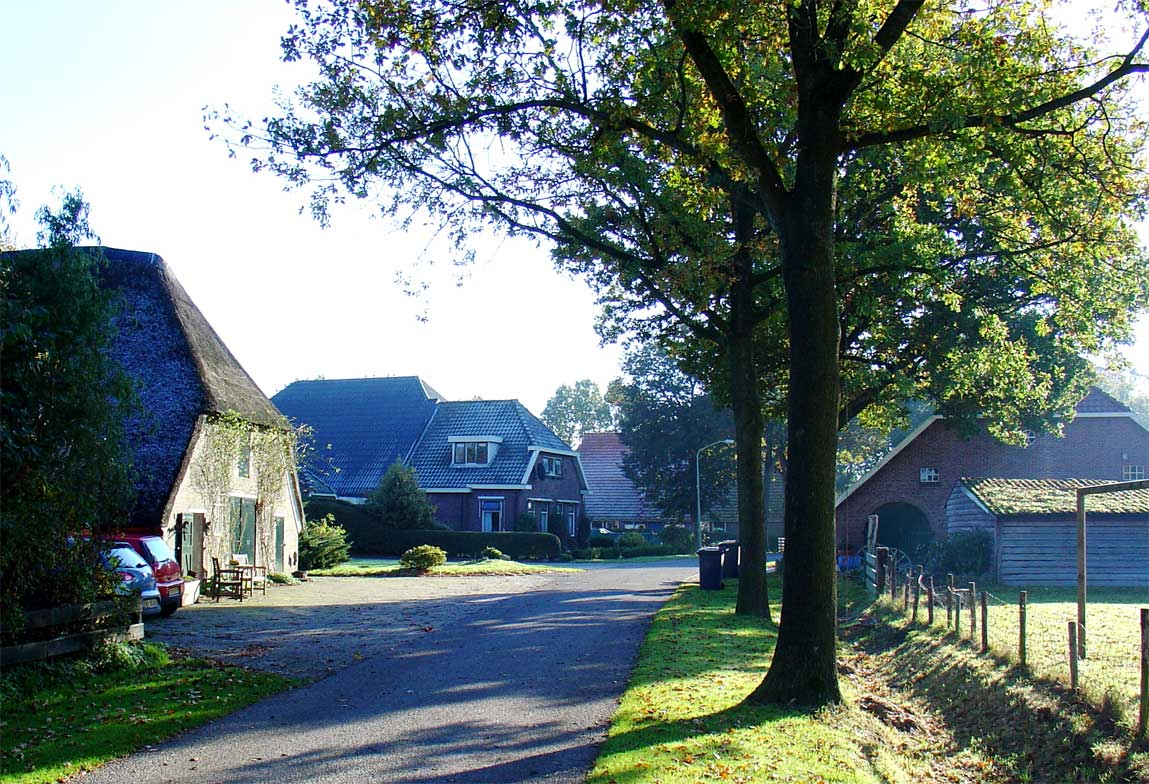
- Village view of Mantinge

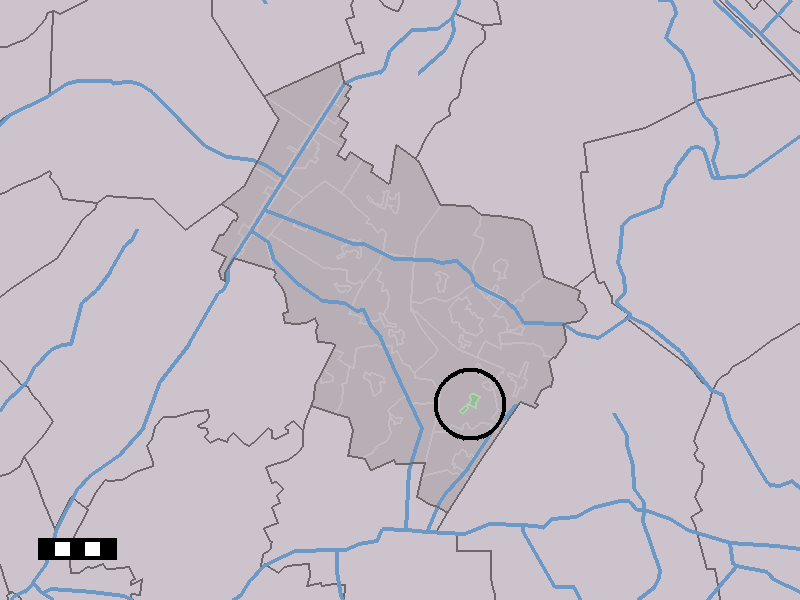
- Mantinge in the municipality of Midden-Drenthe.

- Location in the Netherlands Mantinge (Netherlands)
- Coordinates: 52°48′2″N 6°36′43″E
- Country: Netherlands
- Province: Drenthe
- Municipality: Midden-Drenthe

Area
  - Total: 0.57 km^{2} (0.22 sq mi)
- Elevation: 17 m (56 ft)

Population (2021)
  - Total: 200
  - Density: 350/km^{2} (910/sq mi)
- Time zone: UTC+1 (CET)
  - Summer (DST): UTC+2 (CEST)
- Postal code: 9436
- Dialing code: 0593

Mantinge is a village in the Dutch province of Drenthe. It is a part of the municipality of Midden-Drenthe.

The village was first mentioned in 1335 as Mantinc, and means "settlement of the people of Mante (short for Manfred)".

Mantinge was home to 280 people in 1840. In the 1930s, a work camp was established near the village. On 31 March 1942, it was used by 80 Jewish forced labourers. The food was poor, however the Jewish customs were respected. On 15 July 1942, the labourers were moved to Westerbork transit camp from where most were moved on to the concentration camps.

== Notable people from Mantinge ==
Cartoonist Jan Kruis lived and died here.

== Gallery ==
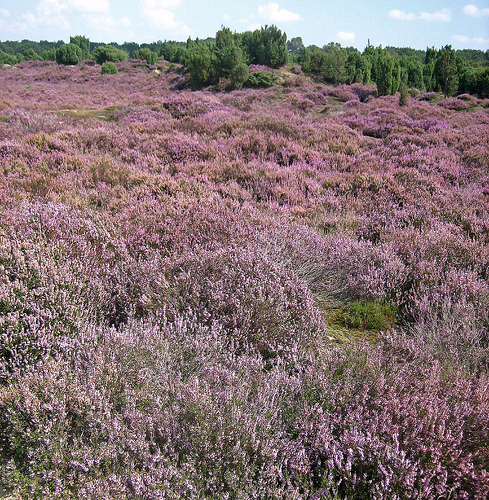
Heath near Mantinge

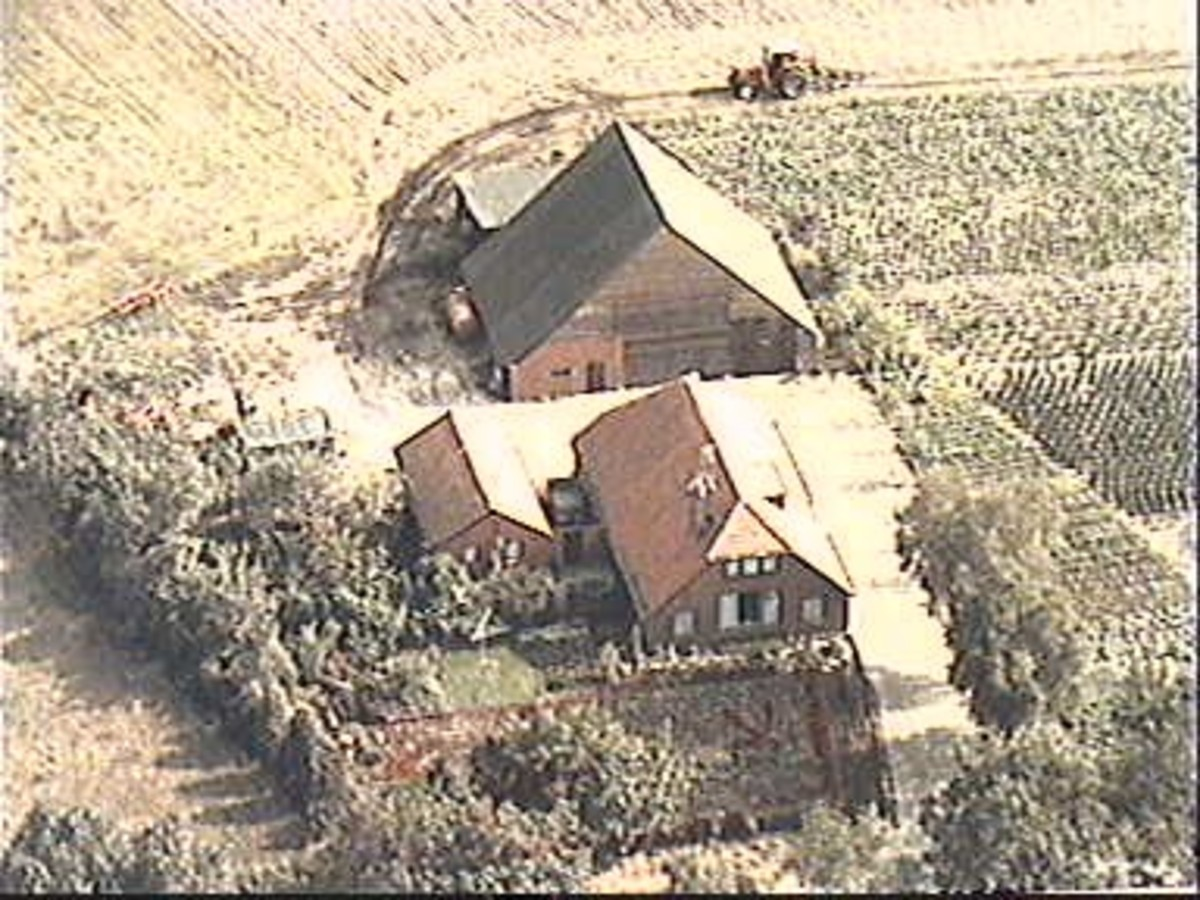
Farm in Mantinge
