= Jerry Bittle =

- Born: October 8, 1949 Wichita, Kansas
- Died: April 9, 2003 (aged 53) Honduras
- Area: Cartoonist
- Notable works: Geech; Shirley and Son

Jerry Bittle (October 8, 1949 – April 9, 2003) was a cartoonist who drew the comic strips Geech and Shirley and Son.

Bittle was born in Wichita, Kansas and was the son of a barber. A graduate of Wichita State University in Kansas, he worked as an editorial cartoonist for the Wichita Eagle and later the Albuquerque Tribune. Bittle moved to Dallas, Texas in 1978 where he worked as a freelance artist and illustrator. He debuted Geech in 1982; it ran in syndication until his death in 2003. Shirley and Son, about life after divorce, debuted in 2000 and also ended after Bittle's death.

Bittle died of a heart attack while on vacation in Honduras. Bittle's family founded the Jerry Bittle Educational Trust in his memory.
