= Dave Pascal =

American cartoonist

Dave Pascal (3 August 1918, Manhattan-3 March 2003, New York City) was an American humorous cartoonist whose work has appeared in The New Yorker and elsewhere. He received the National Cartoonist Society Advertising and Illustration Award for 1968 and their Humor Comic Book Award for 1977.
