= Don Zauker =

Publication information
- Publisher: Vernacoliere
- First appearance: 2003
- Created by: Emiliano Pagani (texts); Daniele Caluri (drawings)

In-story information
- Species: Human
- Team affiliations: Roman Catholic Church

Don Zauker is a fictional comic book character. He was created in 2003 by Emiliano Pagani who writes the text and Daniele Caluri who does the drawings. It was first published and until recently was published by Il Vernacoliere, a satirical monthly magazine printed in Livorno, Italy.

== Character ==
Don Zauker is an old criminal lunatic Catholic exorcist that uses his status to obtain what he wants, which most of the time is sexual intercourse with young ladies and legal impunity. He often complains that the "eight per thousand" contribution and donations are not sufficient to pay for prostitutes or buy him enough Viagra. As a younger man he also had sex with fellow prisoners of some prison. He can be fatally violent and has a shady past, which to date is unknown (although he has said to have been born in the steppe of Kazakhstan), even if the reader can guess he toured the world in his former criminal career, being a convict in many prisons and being sought after by yakuza (even if this could just be some idea his paranoid mind made up). He can be very arrogant with the weak, but turns into a prudent cowardice when faced with influent opponents. The name of the character comes from the Japanese television cartoon series Daitarn 3, whose main villain's name was translated to Don Zauker in the Italian version.

== Relevance ==
Much of the relevance of the satirical character comes from the implied scathing criticism of the Roman Catholic Church, thus it has also been successful in other Catholic countries like France and Spain where it was recently published. Don Zauker is portrayed as sex-obsessed, violent, racist, greedy and occasionally murderous; he constantly takes advantage of the gullibility and submissiveness of Catholic faithfuls. To a part of the Italian population, these are also the most obnoxious flaws of the Roman Catholic Church worshippers, often portrayed as nearly paganish.
