= Fung Chin Pang =

Fung Chin Pang 馮展鵬
- Born: 11 September 1981 (age 45) Hong Kong
- Notable works: Confidential Assassination Troop, La Revanche (2023)

Fung Chin Pang (Chinese: 馮展鵬, born 11 September 1981) is a comic artist and illustrator from Hong Kong.

His work include the manhua series Confidential Assassination Troop, which is about the approach of World War Three and the communications war which proceeds it. It was first published by Tong Li Comics in 2003 and has been released in Hong Kong, Taiwan, Italy, France and Russia. He has released new comic "La Revanche" vol.1 in July 2023.

Pang has also done various illustrations for the novel series, such as Running 5ive (跑攻籃球).

He is the illustrator for the PC game Soul Origin from Valhalla Entertainment.
