= The Sarcophagi of the Sixth Continent, Volume 1: The Universal Threat =

Blake and Mortimer book

The Sarcophagi of the Sixth Continent, Volume 1: The Universal Threat (Les Sarcophages du Sixième Continent, Tome 1: La Menace universelle)
- Cover to the French-language edition
- Date: November 2003
- Series: Blake and Mortimer

Creative team
- Writers: Yves Sente
- Artists: André Juillard

Original publication
- Language: French
- ISBN: 9781849180672

Chronology
- Preceded by: The Strange Encounter
- Followed by: The Sarcophagi of the Sixth Continent, Volume 2: Battle of the Minds

The Sarcophagi of the Sixth Continent, Volume 1: The Universal Threat is the sixteenth Blake and Mortimer book in the series.

== Plot ==
In February 1958, at Simla, Indian warlords came together around Acoka, former risen Emperor of India, who tells them they are developing a "new weapon" that will allow India to take revenge on the West. After his speech, Acoka talks with Major Varitch of the Red Army participating in the operation, and they agree to take revenge on Blake and Mortimer.

Many years ago, the young Philip Mortimer returns for the first time in several years in India to find his parents. In Bombay, he helps a compatriot, Francis Blake, plagued with extremists. The two young men became friends during their journey by train. After having escaped a bomb attack thanks to the fact of having been knocked out of Ambala station, Philip finally gets to Simla, where he finds his parents. The next day, he finds his childhood friend, Sushil, who is very cold with him. Invited to come and listen to the speech of Acoka, the young Scotsman falls in love with Princess Gita. During the reception organized by the Mortimers in honor of their son, Acoka appears suddenly and ordered the guests to leave his country and Philip away from his daughter. Archibald Mortimer, the disappointed by his son's attitude, decides to return him to England the next day. At night, Philip goes on his date with Gita but, arriving late, misses it. The next day, at Simla station, Acoka comes to accuse him of being the cause of the suicide of his daughter and curses him.

Back in February 1958, in London, Mortimer, awakened by a nightmare, is about to join the team of the British Pavilion of the world exhibition of 1958 in Brussels. At the same time, in Antarctica, Professor Anartapur supervises the unloading of a fragile equipment for the Indian base of Gondwana. In a secret underground cavity, he finds Acoka and Major Varitch escorting Colonel Olrik. The Emperor explains to the latter that he will have to work on the plan and that he will win the opportunity of revenge on Mortimer. In Brussels, Mortimer makes Blake visit the British pavilion where a permanent radio contact with the Halley Antarctic base is set up. At the French pavilion, the two friends meet the Professor Labrousse who is about to leave for the French Antarctic base.

On the street, a cyclist passes a message to Blake, which forces him to admit to his friend the real purpose of his visit: a conspiracy against the West by several poor countries linked to a traffic of uranium to the World Expo. The message advises to look on the side of the Congolese pavilion, the two friends decided to take a look. In Antarctica, Acoka is about to send the spirit of Olrik to sabotage Expo thanks to his sarcophagi and the radio link between the British pavilion and the base. Shortly after, in Brussels, all electrical equipment around Blake and Mortimer flashes and stirs, leading to damage in the Congolese pavilion.

Blake and Mortimer then meet their old friend and servant Ahmed Nasir, now the Indian intelligence officer. Together, they conclude that there is a spy in the British pavilion team. Nasir joins the team to find out the traitor, while Blake and Mortimer go to the Soviet and American pavilions, where the strange phenomena recurs until the appearance of the face of Olrik on a screen. The two friends understand that the link between the pavilion and the British base is related to the phenomena and Nasir reveals Badju Singh, the assistant of Mortimer, is the traitor. The same evening, the three friends question him and discover that he exchanges a parcel of uranium with Bert Van den Brand, the foreman of the Congolese pavilion. Arrested thanks to the intervention of the Congolese, Van den Brand tells them that Singh has to go to the Indian Antarctic base on the freighter Ravi Kuta. Blake, Mortimer and Nasir decided to join Professor Labrousse in South Africa to secretly embark with him aboard the ship La Madeleine to the Antarctic.

== English Publication ==
The first publication in English was released by Cinebook Ltd in 2011.
