= Shirley and Son =

American comic strip by Jerry Bittle

- Author(s): Jerry Bittle
- Current status/schedule: Ended
- Launch date: September 27, 2000
- End date: May 25, 2003
- Syndicate(s): United Features Syndicate
- Genre(s): Humor

Shirley and Son was an American comic strip drawn by Jerry Bittle. The strip dealt with the life of eight-year-old Louis, whose parents, Shirley and Roger, are divorced. Louis hopes Shirley and Roger will remarry but they are each getting along with their own lives.

The strip debuted on September 27, 2000, and ended on May 25, 2003, as a result of Bittle's unexpected death.
