= Ramzi Fawaz =

Professor of English

Ramzi Fawaz is an American associate professor of English at the University of Wisconsin–Madison, where he teaches courses in queer and feminist theory, American cultural studies, and LGBTQ literature. He is the author of The New Mutants: Superheroes and the Radical Imagination of American Comics, published in January 2016 by NYU Press, which received the 2012–2013 Center for Lesbian and Gay Studies Fellowship Award for Best First Book Manuscript in LGBT Studies, as well as Queer Forms, published in 2022 by NYU Press. His essays have been published in American Literature, GLQ, Feminist Studies, Callaloo, and ASAP/Journal.

== Life and career ==
Fawaz completed his BA in English Literature and American Studies at the University of California, Berkeley, and completed his graduate education in American Studies at George Washington University. His doctoral research, conducted under the supervision of Melani McAlister and Robert McRuer, examined the cultural politics of superhero comics in the context of postwar American liberalism. He is a former fellow of the Social Science Research Council and the Center for Lesbian and Gay Studies, which awarded him the 2012–2013 CLAGS Fellowship Award. He is also a co-organizer of the Sexual Politics/Sexual Poetics Collective (SPSP), a group of early queer studies scholars working in new directions of the field.

== Work ==
Fawaz states that his work is influenced by queer theory and LGBTQ writers and artists. He is drawn to the idea of cultural production, including the making of visual and written media (e.g. movies, books, comics), and he often explores this through the lens of marginalized and queer groups. According to Fawaz, having been denied civic engagement in other settings, cultural production has become a way for queer people to engage in social and political discourse. He advocates for the importance of comics in society, as they reflect and explore issues like gender and sexuality before the mainstream culture does. Although comics are often disregarded in popular culture, they are able to address these societal issues in an alternative way while staying under the radar.

His first book, The New Mutants: Superheroes and the Radical Imagination of American Comics, explores how the American superhero came to embody the political aspirations of racial, gender, and sexual minorities in the post–World War II period. He argues that the superhero transformed from a symbol of white masculinity in the 1940s and 1950s to a social outcast (often depicted as a mutant) in the early 1960s. This transformation encouraged comic book writers and artists to develop various left-wing political ideals that were not socially acceptable in their work. The powerful mutants and freaks, who were social outcasts, became symbols of social and political aspirations for marginalized groups, including racial and sexual minorities, working-class people, and women in the United States.

== Selected publications ==
Queer Forms (New York: NYU Press, 2022)

The New Mutants: Superheroes and the Radical Imagination of American Comics (New York: NYU Press, 2016).

I Cherish My Bile Duct as Much as Any Other Organ': Political Disgust and the Digestive Life of AIDS in Tony Kushner's Angels in America, Special Issue On the Visceral, edited by Marcia Ochoa, Sharon Holland, and Kyla Wazana Tompkins. GLQ 21.1 (2015): 121–152.

Space, That Bottomless Pit: Planetary Exile and Metaphors of Belonging in American Afrofuturist Cinema. Callaloo 35.4 (2012): 1103–1122.

Where no X-man has Gone Before!' Mutant Superheroes and the Cultural Politics of Popular Fantasy in Postwar America. Special Issue on Speculative Fictions, ed. Priscilla Wald and Gerry Canavan. American Literature 83.2 (Summer 2011): 355–388.
