= Jan Kruis =

Dutch comics artist (1933–2017)

Johannes Andries “Jan” Kruis
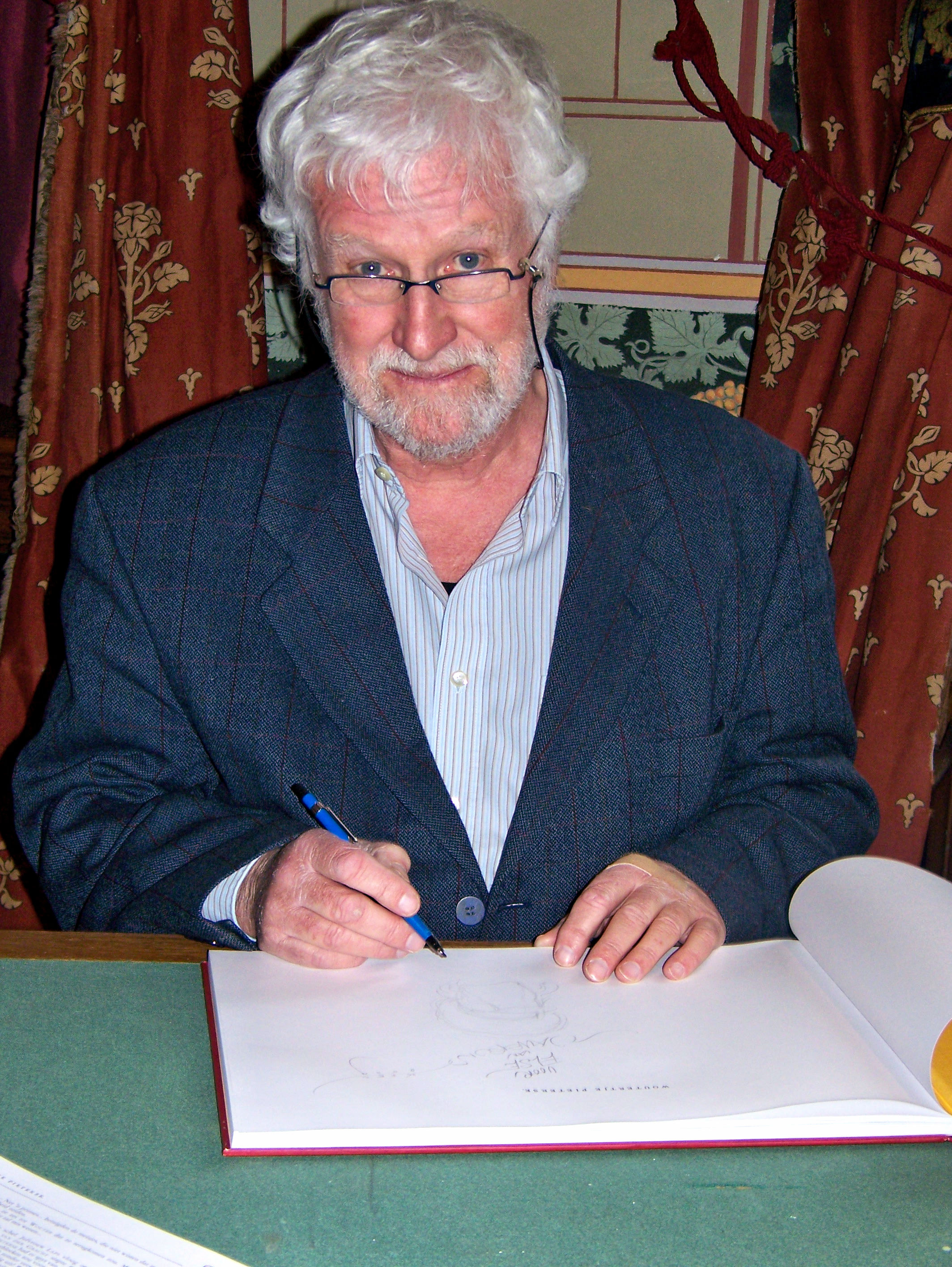
- Born: 8 June 1933 Rotterdam, Netherlands
- Died: 19 January 2017 (aged 83) Mantinge, Netherlands
- Areas: Cartoonist, Writer, Artist
- Notable works: Jack, Jacky and the Juniors
- Awards: Order of the Netherlands Lion (1996)

Johannes Andries "Jan" Kruis (Dutch pronunciation: [jɑŋ ˈkrœys]; 8 June 1933 – 19 January 2017) was a Dutch comics artist best known for the family strip Jack, Jacky and the Juniors (Jan, Jans en de Kinderen).

== Biography ==
He began creating comics as a child. Later he worked for the Dutch comics pioneer Marten Toonder. Kruis started his own comics career drawing Prins Freddie for the magazine De Havenloods, but became famous thanks to his series of one-pagers called Jan, Jans en de Kinderen (Jack, Jacky and the Juniors). It first appeared in the woman's magazine Libelle on December 12, 1970. In German-speaking Switzerland it appeared in the magazine Spick which targeted children and teenagers; and in Germany Favorit published it for some time under the name "Ulli, Ulla und die Kinder". He also had a gag comic named Gregor running in Tintin, between 1965 and 1966, which was later reprinted in Pep. Kruis took over Sjors en Sjimmie from Frans Piët in 1969 and modernized the characters, including a less stereotypical depiction of Sjimmie's black features. The series was later taken over by Jan Steeman.

He was furthermore active as an illustrator of novels, magazines, advertisements and record covers.

Kruis received the Order of the Netherlands Lion in 1996. Two years later he retired. Daughter Andrea Kruis has followed in her father's footsteps.

In 2013 his career was celebrated in a one-off glossy-zine; this includes previously unpublished gags of a comic about an infant punk raised by a gay couple; hence the nickname "Jan, Jan en de Kinderen" ("Jack, Jack and the Juniors").

Jan Kruis died in his hometown Mantinge (Drenthe) at the age of 83. On 20 January 2017, a good friend of the family informed the press about his death on the previous day.

== See also ==
- Jack, Jacky and the Juniors
