= Bastiaan Geleijnse =

Dutch cartoonist and comics artist

Bastiaan Geleijnse (born 8 March 1967, Utrecht) is a Dutch cartoonist and comics artist. He is the winner of the 2004 Stripschapprijs for Fokke & Sukke, with John Reid and Jean-Marc van Tol.

Prior to writing comics, he was a Communications Specialist in McKinsey & Company's Amsterdam office, from 1997 to 2003.
