= Jean-Marc van Tol =

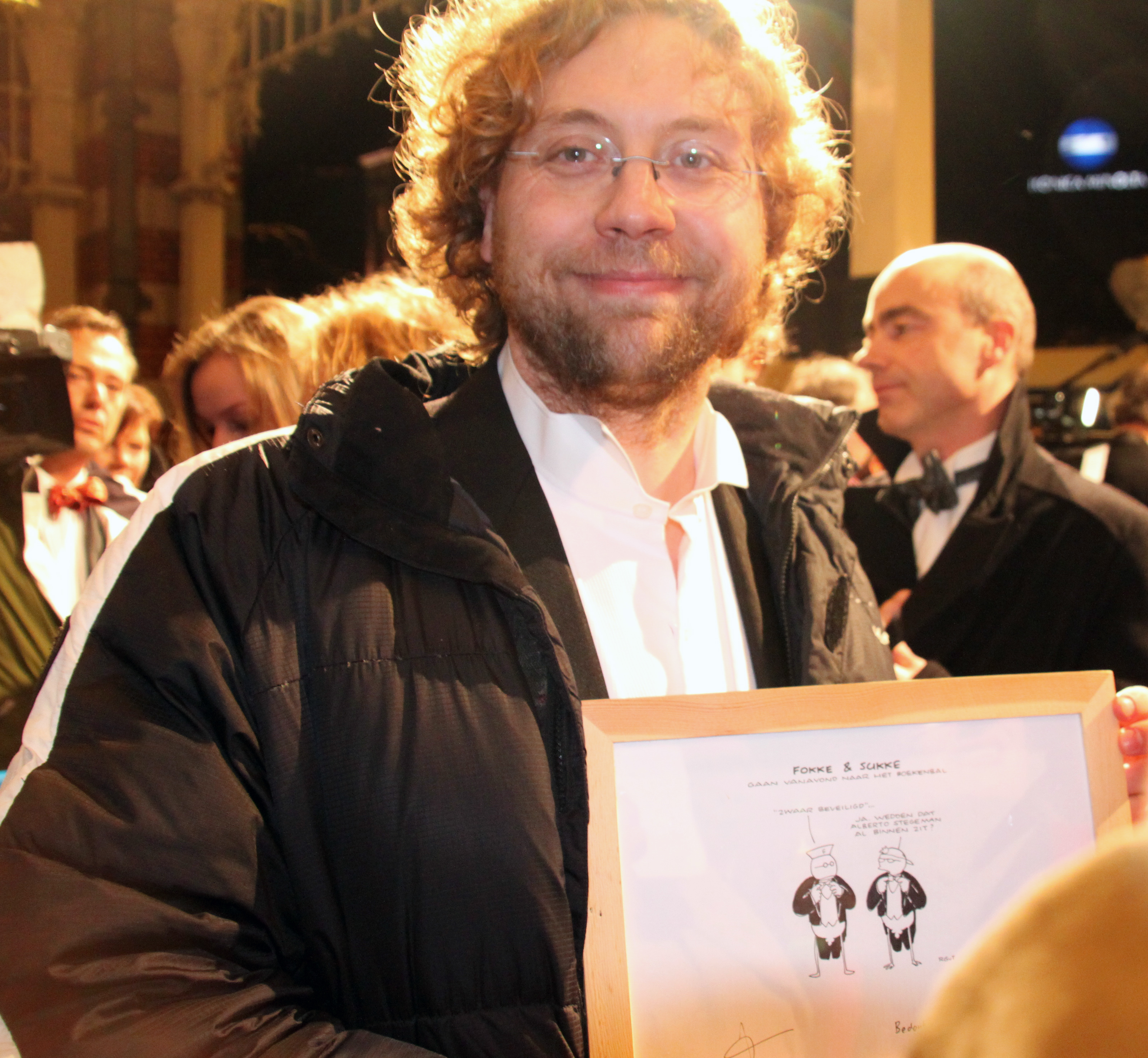
Jean-Marc van Tol

Jean-Marc van Tol (born 6 July 1967, Rotterdam) is a cartoonist. He is the winner of the 2004 Stripschapprijs for Fokke & Sukke, with John Reid and Bastiaan Geleijnse. He also played in the Dutch TV-series Wie is de mol.
