= Il Vernacoliere =

- Editor: Mario Cardinali
- Categories: Politics, social issues, art, humor, culture
- Frequency: monthly
- Total circulation: 43,000
- Founded: 1982; 43 years ago
- Country: Italy
- Based in: Livorno, Tuscany
- Website: Il Vernacoliere.com
- ISSN: 1721-7741
- OCLC: 66387537

Il Vernacoliere is an Italian monthly satirical magazine based in Livorno, Tuscany, Italy, founded in 1982 by editor-director Mario Cardinali. The periodical started to operate as a successor of the pre-existing Livornocronaca, first issued in 1961. Il Vernacoliere is characterised by its absence of advertising, its satirical style, and for the widespread use of the dialect of Livorno. It is now distributed throughout Tuscany, in many newsstands of central Italy, and in selected ones in the rest of Italy.

== History and profile ==
The magazine traces its roots in Livornocronaca, which operated weekly from 1961 to 1969 and which was written in standard Italian. Livornocronaca was issued twice a month from 1969 to 1972, and eventually only monthly with the subtitle Il Vernacoliere. In 1982, the title Livornocronaca was dropped, and the name was changed permanently into Il Vernacoliere. The magazine slowly but steadily gained momentum beyond the borders of the Province of Livorno, and it is now read in most Northern and Central Italy.

Il Vernacoliere is well known for its popular, raw, heavily irreverent political and social satire, written in the dialect of Livorno or, at the very least, with a distinctive Tuscan tinge. The magazine features satirical articles, comics, and an editorial note (in standard Italian), with the occasional addition of opinion pieces. Amongst Italian magazines, Il Vernacoliere is notable for having no advertising, covering all its expenses with the sale of the journal and of the associated gadgets. Its famous locandine, (in English: playbills) are saucy showcases of the main articles of the magazine, to be displayed at newsstands. Their text is written by the Director.

The founder and current Director of Il Vernacoliere is Mario Cardinali. He is also the author of most political satire pieces, written in pure and witty Livorno dialect. Notable Vernacoliere contributors include Federico Maria Sardelli, Daniele Caluri, Max Greggio, Marco Citi, Ettore Borzacchini, and Andrea Camerini.

The periodical is considered to be one of the freest magazines currently published in Italy. According to journalist Camillo Langone, it is an example that, in present-day Italy, satire can be published at a dialectal level only, while not viable in standard Italian.

== See also ==
- List of magazines published in Italy
