= Geech (comic strip) =

American comic strip by Jerry Bittle

- Author: Jerry Bittle
- Current status/schedule: Ended
- Launch date: July 19, 1982
- End date: May 25, 2003
- Syndicate(s): Universal Press Syndicate (1982-2000); United Features Syndicate (2000-2003)
- Genre: Humor

Geech was an American comic strip by Jerry Bittle. The strip showcased the eccentricities and foibles of people in small town America, represented by the fictional city of Grimace, Texas.

== Publication history ==
Geech debuted July 19, 1982. Production of the comic strip ended with the death of Bittle in 2003. Reruns of the strip continue in some papers as "Geech Classics".

== Characters ==
- Geech Dingum — the star of the strip. He is a lazy, unsuccessful, accident prone mechanic at a Merle's Service Station.
- Merle Sisson — Geech's boss. He is the owner as well as a mechanic and is always trying to put Geech to work. Neither Merle nor Geech are very mechanically inclined.
- Ruby Moon — red-haired waitress at the local cafe, who is always looking for a man. She once was married.
- Nadine Puckett — Ruby's best friend, an overweight woman who works as a hairdresser.
- Erma Crosgrain — the unseen nemesis of Ruby and Nadine. Although they are always putting her down and calling her a tramp, they envy the fact that she is able to pick up a man at the bar.
- Artie Beemer — lazy heavy-set man with a recessed hairline and glasses, frequently seen at the bar, and in scenes at home, trying to avoid dieting and housework. He has a wife named Vera and a son named Jake. Artie is often seen taking Jake for a walk, which always seems to end at the doughnut shop.
- Reverend J. C. Meeks — an older clergyman who is as smart-mouthed as everyone else in the comic strip. He is sometimes the target of Merle and Geech's misguided religious questions, such as asking about David and Delilah (a cross between biblical stories of David and Goliath and Samson and Delilah).
- Rabbit T. Fester — surly bar owner, often shortchanging customers and not wanting to chat. He has an ex-wife named Monica, who left him after seven days, but still calls to harass him regularly. Rabbit hired Raymond Flowers, a big bouncer type, to help out around the bar, who has a gentle disposition, especially compared to Rabbit.
- Homer Purvis — runs the local barber shop. He is an elderly man (similar in appearance to the Reverend) who is always falling asleep in church, while driving, and even while cutting people's hair. He is married to Clara.
- Weldon Ledbetter — aspiring country-western singer, and one of Homer's frequent customers, who can never seem to get his sideburns cut evenly.
- The Doctor - The town's chain-smoking physician. Once sued by Ruby when he mistakenly told her she was pregnant.

Geech, Weldon, and Artie belong to the Royal Order of Mystic Ducks, a lodge whose members wear a fez type hat with a duck bill in front. At meetings, they drink beer and throw the bottles, then they duck.
