= John Reid (cartoonist) =

Dutch cartoonist and judge (born 1968)

John Reid (born 1968) is a Dutch cartoonist and judge.

Reid was born in 1968 in Utrecht. Reid makes the cartoon Fokke & Sukke with Bastiaan Geleijnse and Jean-Marc van Tol. Originally, the cartoon was published in the satirical student newspaper Propria Cures. Since 1999, it is published in the national newspaper NRC Handelsblad. Reid, Geleijnse, and Van Tol won the Stripschapprijs in 2003.

Reid studied law. He has been a judge at the court of justice in Alkmaar since 2002. In 2015, he became the new host of the TV show De Rijdende Rechter in which civil disputes are settled. In May 2025 Reid announced the show would be cancelled due to budget cuts at the Dutch public broadcasting system from 2027 onwards.
