= Jack, Jacky and the Juniors =

Dutch comic series written and drawn by Jan Kruis

- Author(s): Jan Kruis; Studio Jan Kruis; Peter Weijenberg; Barbara Stok
- Illustrator(s): Jan Kruis; Studio Jan Kruis (from 1999)
- Current status/schedule: Running
- Launch date: 1970
- Publisher(s): Joop Wiggers; VNU Tijdschriften; DPG Media
- Genre(s): Humor comics; gag cartoon; family comic
- Original language: Dutch

Jack, Jacky and the Juniors (Dutch: Jan, Jans en de Kinderen) is a Dutch comic strip originally made by Jan Kruis for women's weekly magazine Libelle, for whom they've become mascots. It chronicles the events of an average family and has been running since 1970. Since 1999, the gags are made by Studio Kruis.

== Origins ==
The original line-up of the family consisted of Jack, Jacky and their daughters Karlijn and Catootje. A baby-son, Gertje, was introduced in 1993. They also have pets; Lotje, a male dog with a feminine name and a red cat called Edgar. They were later joined by Loedertje, a Siamese cat whose name closely translates as bitch and a white pony named Fury. Other recurring characters are Catootje's best friend Joe, Jacky's cousin Hanna (a single mother by choice), grandad Gerrit and Moeps Pepernoot.

The main characters are modelled after Kruis' own family and pets, except for Jack who in turn inspired his creator. The early gags were originally written for its precursor Gregor and published from December 12, 1970 onwards. Over 60 volumes have been released since 1971. The comic moved with the times, proving that no subject was too weird to be discussed by the family, particularly emancipation. The characters never grew older; actually, some of them dropped a few years in age since the comic was taken over by Studio Kruis.

== Characters ==
=== The family ===
- Jack: began as a traditional-conservative father working nine to five at an oil company. He could've been a successful businessman like his unseen brother Gijs but ultimately chose not to. Jack became a part-time househusband pursuing other interests like writing a book.
- Jacky: began as a traditional housewife, but soon discovered feminism, yoga and - unsuccessfully - vegan food. She formed a political party for women and won a seat at the local elections. It was during this period that Jacky altered her trademark bowler-shaped haircut till the comic's 40th anniversary. After the birth of Gertje she stepped down from politics to become a part-time journalist.
- Karlijn: eldest daughter,(14 years old) is in her graduation-year. She used to be an avid vegetarian with matching soapbox politics, now she's a modern teenager concerned about her reputation at school. Karlijn was involved in short-lived and somewhat controversial relationships, Thomas being the last.
- Catootje: youngest daughter and the main protagonist. She has a close relationship with Joe whom she refers to as her fiance. At dinner she tends to turn down any food that isn't meat and potatoes.

=== Friends, relatives and others ===
- Grandad (Gerrit): Jack's father, a conservative man who never understood why his son gave up on business; he used to dismiss him as an inferior version of Gijs. All seemed to be forgiven with the birth of Gertje, the third male in line at last. Though stuck in his old ways (smoking cigars for instance) he loves his grandchildren, particularly Catootje whom he entertains and educates with reworked fairytales and wartime-stories. Gerrit is close friends with the widowed Moeps Pepernoot, namesake of a distinct character by Kruis.
- Grandma Stien: Jacky's mother, moved to the US after a failed marriage. During visits - including the birth of her grandson - she befriended Grandad. Her adopted American accent didn't go on unnoticed on Catootje.
- Hanna: Jacky's feminist cousin, first appeared in the final stage of her pregnancy. She gave birth to a daughter who was to be named Emmeline Germaine Hedy after early fighters of women's emancipation. Instead Jack had the baby registered as Sientje in tribute of his grand-aunt, an unsung heroine in feminism. Hanna returned for annual sleepovers and assisted Jacky - back in touch with her own feminist beliefs - in founding the women's party. Upon her return from an extended break (apparently caused by the birth of Gertje), Hanna signed in at an online gay-dating agency.
- Harold: rich boy living with his divorced father. Initially showing off his muscles and expensive presents he was fierce competition for Joe. They soon became friends to the extent that they're excluding Catootje from boys-only events.

=== Pets ===
- Edgar: red cat, apparently named after Edgar Allan Poe. As a comic relief he sits on the sofa giving the right look at the right time. During his solo-performances he appears to be a great philosopher.
- Lotje: male dog with a feminine name. He used to relate to the wolf and the fox, but after reading Karlijn's French dictionary he started to believe that he was Napoleon, Diego Maradona, Saint Nicholas or King Willem IV. Meanwhile, Lotje took a keen but unrequited interest in Josephine, Stien's dog.
- Loedertje: Siamese stray-cat who debuted by entering through the sewerage. It took time for the other pets to grow accustomed to her as they once were framed for plundering the fridge. Not having any maternal instincts she had no problem seeing her six kittens (fathered by different cats) sold.
- Fury: white pony, given to Catootje by a befriended farmer after the family traded the big city for the countryside. His dislike of getting washed or being subjected to the art of horseback riding causes Catootje and Jack's no end of grief. Consequently, his role diminished and unlike the other characters he did grow older.
- Anne-Marie: transgender bulldog given to Joe by the family.
- Mops: Moeps' dog, hesitant to admit that she's a bulldog in case it puts people off.
