= Malcolm Shaw =

Malcolm Shaw may refer to:

- Malcolm Shaw (lawyer) (born 1947), British legal academic, author, editor and lawyer
- Malcolm Shaw (rower) (1947–2014), New Zealand-born, Australian representative rower
- Malcolm Shaw (footballer) (born 1995), Trinidadian professional footballer
- Malcolm Shaw (comics) (1946–1984), British comics writer and editor
