= 1991 Pepsi 400 =

15th race of the 1991 NASCAR Winston Cup Series

Race details
- Race 15 of 29 in the 1991 NASCAR Winston Cup Series
- The 1991 Pepsi 400 program cover.
- Date: July 6, 1991
- Official name: 33rd Annual Pepsi 400
- Location: Daytona Beach, Florida, Daytona International Speedway
- Course: Permanent racing facility
- Course length: 2.5 miles (4.0 km)
- Distance: 160 laps, 400 mi (643.737 km)
- Scheduled distance: 160 laps, 400 mi (643.737 km)
- Average speed: 159.116 miles per hour (256.072 km/h)
- Attendance: 80,000

Pole position
Driver	Sterling Marlin	Junior Johnson & Associates
- Time: 47.286

Most laps led
Driver	Ernie Irvan	Morgan-McClure Motorsports
- Laps: 85

Winner
No. 9	Bill Elliott	Melling Racing

Television in the United States
- Network: ESPN
- Announcers: Bob Jenkins, Benny Parsons, Ned Jarrett

Radio in the United States
- Radio: Motor Racing Network

The 1991 Pepsi 400 was the 15th stock car race of the 1991 NASCAR Winston Cup Series season and the 33rd iteration of the event. The race was held on Saturday, July 6, 1991, before an audience of 80,000 in Daytona Beach, Florida at Daytona International Speedway, a 2.5 miles (4.0 km) permanent triangular-shaped superspeedway. The race took the scheduled 160 laps to complete. In the final laps of the race, Melling Racing driver Bill Elliott would manage to mount a late-race charge to the lead, passing for the lead with 13 to go to take his 34th career NASCAR Winston Cup Series victory and his only victory of the season. To fill out the top three, Junior Johnson & Associates driver Geoff Bodine and Robert Yates Racing driver Davey Allison would finish second and third, respectively.

On lap 120 of the race, owner-driver Darrell Waltrip, along with RahMoc Enterprises driver Joe Ruttman, would both be involved in a crash on the track's back straightaway. Waltrip and Ruttman would both slide into the infield grass, and Waltrip's car, after hitting a bump in the infield, would then proceed to go into a series of violent flips, destroying Waltrip's car. Waltrip was not seriously hurt.

== Background ==
The layout of Daytona International Speedway, the venue where the race was held.

Daytona International Speedway is one of three superspeedways to hold NASCAR races, the other two being Indianapolis Motor Speedway and Talladega Superspeedway. The standard track at Daytona International Speedway is a four-turn superspeedway that is 2.5 miles (4.0 km) long. The track's turns are banked at 31 degrees, while the front stretch, the location of the finish line, is banked at 18 degrees.

=== Entry list ===
- (R) denotes rookie driver.

#	Driver	Team	Make
1	Rick Mast	Precision Products Racing	Oldsmobile
2	Rusty Wallace	Penske Racing South	Pontiac
3	Dale Earnhardt	Richard Childress Racing	Chevrolet
4	Ernie Irvan	Morgan–McClure Motorsports	Chevrolet
5	Ricky Rudd	Hendrick Motorsports	Chevrolet
6	Mark Martin	Roush Racing	Ford
7	Alan Kulwicki	AK Racing	Ford
8	Rick Wilson	Stavola Brothers Racing	Buick
9	Bill Elliott	Melling Racing	Ford
10	Derrike Cope	Whitcomb Racing	Chevrolet
11	Geoff Bodine	Junior Johnson & Associates	Ford
12	Hut Stricklin	Bobby Allison Motorsports	Buick
14	Mike Chase	A. J. Foyt Racing	Oldsmobile
15	Morgan Shepherd	Bud Moore Engineering	Ford
17	Darrell Waltrip	Darrell Waltrip Motorsports	Chevrolet
19	Chad Little	Little Racing	Ford
20	Buddy Baker	Moroso Racing	Oldsmobile
21	Dale Jarrett	Wood Brothers Racing	Ford
22	Sterling Marlin	Junior Johnson & Associates	Ford
23	Eddie Bierschwale	B&B Racing	Oldsmobile
24	Mickey Gibbs	Team III Racing	Pontiac
25	Ken Schrader	Hendrick Motorsports	Chevrolet
26	Brett Bodine	King Racing	Buick
28	Davey Allison	Robert Yates Racing	Ford
30	Michael Waltrip	Bahari Racing	Pontiac
33	Harry Gant	Leo Jackson Motorsports	Oldsmobile
41	Larry Pearson	Larry Hedrick Motorsports	Chevrolet
42	Bobby Hillin Jr.	SABCO Racing	Pontiac
43	Richard Petty	Petty Enterprises	Pontiac
47	Greg Sacks	Close Racing	Oldsmobile
49	Stanley Smith (R)	BS&S Motorsports	Buick
51	Jeff Purvis (R)	Phoenix Racing	Oldsmobile
52	Jimmy Means	Jimmy Means Racing	Pontiac
55	Ted Musgrave (R)	U.S. Racing	Pontiac
66	Lake Speed	Cale Yarborough Motorsports	Pontiac
68	Bobby Hamilton (R)	TriStar Motorsports	Oldsmobile
70	J. D. McDuffie	McDuffie Racing	Pontiac
71	Dave Marcis	Marcis Auto Racing	Chevrolet
73	Phil Barkdoll	Barkdoll Racing	Oldsmobile
75	Joe Ruttman	RahMoc Enterprises	Oldsmobile
80	Jimmy Horton	S&H Racing	Ford
90	Wally Dallenbach Jr. (R)	Donlavey Racing	Ford
94	Terry Labonte	Hagan Racing	Oldsmobile
95	Kerry Teague	Sadler Brothers Racing	Chevrolet
98	Jimmy Spencer	Travis Carter Enterprises	Chevrolet

== Qualifying ==
Qualifying was split into two rounds. The first round was held on Thursday, July 2, at 10:00 AM EST. Each driver would have one lap to set a time. During the first round, the top 20 drivers in the round would be guaranteed a starting spot in the race. If a driver was not able to guarantee a spot in the first round, they had the option to scrub their time from the first round and try and run a faster lap time in a second round qualifying run, held on Friday, July 3, at 11:00 AM EST. As with the first round, each driver would have one lap to set a time. For this specific race, positions 21-40 would be decided on time, and depending on who needed it, a select amount of positions were given to cars who had not otherwise qualified but were high enough in owner's points; up to two provisionals were given. If needed, a past champion who did not qualify on either time or provisionals could use a champion's provisional, adding one more spot to the field.

Sterling Marlin, driving for Junior Johnson & Associates, would win the pole, setting a time of 47.286 and an average speed of 190.331 miles per hour (306.308 km/h) in the first round.

Four drivers would fail to qualify.

=== Full qualifying results ===
Pos.	#	Driver	Team	Make	Time	Speed
1	22	Sterling Marlin	Junior Johnson & Associates	Ford	47.286	190.331
2	28	Davey Allison	Robert Yates Racing	Ford	47.391	189.909
3	33	Harry Gant	Leo Jackson Motorsports	Oldsmobile	47.402	189.865
4	11	Geoff Bodine	Junior Johnson & Associates	Ford	47.618	189.004
5	68	Bobby Hamilton (R)	TriStar Motorsports	Oldsmobile	47.659	188.842
6	66	Lake Speed	Cale Yarborough Motorsports	Pontiac	47.679	188.762
7	30	Michael Waltrip	Bahari Racing	Pontiac	47.757	188.454
8	19	Chad Little	Little Racing	Ford	47.765	188.422
9	1	Rick Mast	Precision Products Racing	Oldsmobile	47.784	188.348
10	9	Bill Elliott	Melling Racing	Ford	47.788	188.332
11	4	Ernie Irvan	Morgan–McClure Motorsports	Chevrolet	47.794	188.308
12	3	Dale Earnhardt	Richard Childress Racing	Chevrolet	47.795	188.304
13	5	Ricky Rudd	Hendrick Motorsports	Chevrolet	47.796	188.300
14	8	Rick Wilson	Stavola Brothers Racing	Buick	47.910	187.852
15	12	Hut Stricklin	Bobby Allison Motorsports	Buick	47.920	187.813
16	75	Joe Ruttman	RahMoc Enterprises	Oldsmobile	47.957	187.668
17	7	Alan Kulwicki	AK Racing	Ford	47.964	187.641
18	15	Morgan Shepherd	Bud Moore Engineering	Ford	48.055	187.285
19	20	Buddy Baker	Moroso Racing	Oldsmobile	48.124	187.017
20	17	Darrell Waltrip	Darrell Waltrip Motorsports	Chevrolet	48.128	187.001
Failed to lock in Round 1
21	43	Richard Petty	Petty Enterprises	Pontiac	48.171	186.834
22	25	Ken Schrader	Hendrick Motorsports	Chevrolet	48.188	186.768
23	26	Brett Bodine	King Racing	Buick	48.220	186.645
24	55	Ted Musgrave (R)	U.S. Racing	Pontiac	48.249	186.532
25	42	Bobby Hillin Jr.	SABCO Racing	Pontiac	48.265	186.471
26	6	Mark Martin	Roush Racing	Ford	48.286	186.389
27	49	Stanley Smith (R)	BS&S Motorsports	Buick	48.298	186.343
28	2	Rusty Wallace	Penske Racing South	Pontiac	48.353	186.131
29	51	Jeff Purvis (R)	Phoenix Racing	Oldsmobile	48.378	186.035
30	14	Mike Chase	A. J. Foyt Racing	Oldsmobile	48.439	185.801
31	21	Dale Jarrett	Wood Brothers Racing	Ford	48.444	185.782
32	98	Jimmy Spencer	Travis Carter Enterprises	Chevrolet	48.554	185.361
33	47	Greg Sacks	Close Racing	Oldsmobile	48.593	185.212
34	41	Larry Pearson	Larry Hedrick Motorsports	Chevrolet	48.651	184.991
35	24	Mickey Gibbs	Team III Racing	Pontiac	48.654	184.980
36	10	Derrike Cope	Whitcomb Racing	Chevrolet	48.656	184.972
37	73	Phil Barkdoll	Barkdoll Racing	Oldsmobile	48.689	184.847
38	52	Jimmy Means	Jimmy Means Racing	Pontiac	48.697	184.816
39	71	Dave Marcis	Marcis Auto Racing	Chevrolet	48.774	184.525
40	90	Wally Dallenbach Jr. (R)	Donlavey Racing	Ford	49.063	183.438
41	94	Terry Labonte	Hagan Racing	Oldsmobile	49.147	183.124
Failed to qualify
42	70	J. D. McDuffie	McDuffie Racing	Pontiac	-*	-*
43	23	Eddie Bierschwale	B&B Racing	Oldsmobile	-*	-*
44	80	Jimmy Horton	S&H Racing	Ford	-*	-*
45	95	Kerry Teague	Sadler Brothers Racing	Chevrolet	-*	-*
Official first round qualifying results
Official starting lineup

== Race results ==
Fin	St	#	Driver	Team	Make	Laps	Led	Status	Pts	Winnings
1	10	9	Bill Elliott	Melling Racing	Ford	160	13	running	180	$75,000
2	4	11	Geoff Bodine	Junior Johnson & Associates	Ford	160	4	running	175	$48,325
3	2	28	Davey Allison	Robert Yates Racing	Ford	160	11	running	170	$36,950
4	22	25	Ken Schrader	Hendrick Motorsports	Chevrolet	160	21	running	165	$27,450
5	11	4	Ernie Irvan	Morgan–McClure Motorsports	Chevrolet	160	85	running	165	$36,525
6	7	30	Michael Waltrip	Bahari Racing	Pontiac	160	4	running	155	$17,300
7	12	3	Dale Earnhardt	Richard Childress Racing	Chevrolet	160	8	running	151	$23,200
8	1	22	Sterling Marlin	Junior Johnson & Associates	Ford	160	2	running	147	$17,100
9	13	5	Ricky Rudd	Hendrick Motorsports	Chevrolet	160	8	running	143	$16,500
10	32	98	Jimmy Spencer	Travis Carter Enterprises	Chevrolet	160	2	running	139	$15,800
11	26	6	Mark Martin	Roush Racing	Ford	160	0	running	130	$17,090
12	28	2	Rusty Wallace	Penske Racing South	Pontiac	160	0	running	127	$9,600
13	19	20	Buddy Baker	Moroso Racing	Oldsmobile	160	0	running	124	$9,210
14	17	7	Alan Kulwicki	AK Racing	Ford	160	0	running	121	$14,070
15	25	42	Bobby Hillin Jr.	SABCO Racing	Pontiac	160	0	running	118	$14,480
16	15	12	Hut Stricklin	Bobby Allison Motorsports	Buick	160	2	running	120	$10,440
17	36	10	Derrike Cope	Whitcomb Racing	Chevrolet	160	0	running	112	$14,825
18	31	21	Dale Jarrett	Wood Brothers Racing	Ford	160	0	running	109	$9,810
19	9	1	Rick Mast	Precision Products Racing	Oldsmobile	160	0	running	106	$9,295
20	18	15	Morgan Shepherd	Bud Moore Engineering	Ford	159	0	running	103	$13,730
21	34	41	Larry Pearson	Larry Hedrick Motorsports	Chevrolet	159	0	running	100	$5,510
22	21	43	Richard Petty	Petty Enterprises	Pontiac	159	0	running	97	$8,490
23	3	33	Harry Gant	Leo Jackson Motorsports	Oldsmobile	159	0	running	94	$8,470
24	14	8	Rick Wilson	Stavola Brothers Racing	Buick	158	0	running	91	$8,050
25	39	71	Dave Marcis	Marcis Auto Racing	Chevrolet	157	0	running	88	$7,930
26	38	52	Jimmy Means	Jimmy Means Racing	Pontiac	157	0	running	85	$4,810
27	35	24	Mickey Gibbs	Team III Racing	Pontiac	154	0	running	82	$5,440
28	5	68	Bobby Hamilton (R)	TriStar Motorsports	Oldsmobile	153	0	running	79	$6,070
29	8	19	Chad Little	Little Racing	Ford	150	0	running	76	4,475
30	29	51	Jeff Purvis (R)	Phoenix Racing	Oldsmobile	144	0	running	73	$5,080
31	16	75	Joe Ruttman	RahMoc Enterprises	Oldsmobile	125	0	crash	70	$7,000
32	20	17	Darrell Waltrip	Darrell Waltrip Motorsports	Chevrolet	119	0	crash	67	$5,945
33	30	14	Mike Chase	A. J. Foyt Racing	Oldsmobile	106	0	crash	64	$4,265
34	40	90	Wally Dallenbach Jr. (R)	Donlavey Racing	Ford	89	0	ignition	61	$4,585
35	37	73	Phil Barkdoll	Barkdoll Racing	Oldsmobile	84	0	crash	58	$4,205
36	23	26	Brett Bodine	King Racing	Buick	17	0	engine	55	$6,800
37	24	55	Ted Musgrave (R)	U.S. Racing	Pontiac	12	0	crash	52	$4,745
38	6	66	Lake Speed	Cale Yarborough Motorsports	Pontiac	12	0	crash	49	$6,130
39	33	47	Greg Sacks	Close Racing	Oldsmobile	12	0	crash	46	$4,120
40	27	49	Stanley Smith (R)	BS&S Motorsports	Buick	12	0	crash	43	$4,080
41	41	94	Terry Labonte	Hagan Racing	Oldsmobile	8	0	quit	40	$6,080
Official race results

== Standings after the race ==
Drivers' Championship standings

	Pos	Driver	Points
	1	Dale Earnhardt	2,353
	2	Ricky Rudd	2,207 (-146)
1	3	Ernie Irvan	2,139 (-214)
1	4	Ken Schrader	2,137 (–216)
1	5	Davey Allison	2,124 (–229)
3	6	Darrell Waltrip	2,060 (–293)
	7	Harry Gant	2,000 (–353)
	8	Mark Martin	1,985 (–368)
1	9	Michael Waltrip	1,852 (–501)
1	10	Sterling Marlin	1,841 (–512)
Official driver's standings

- Note: Only the first 10 positions are included for the driver standings.

Previous race: 1991 Miller Genuine Draft 400 (Michigan)	NASCAR Winston Cup Series; 1991 season	Next race: 1991 Miller Genuine Draft 500
