= End of the Line =

End of the Line or The End of the Line may refer to:

- In railway terminology, a train station at the end, or terminus, of a rail line

== Music ==
- End of the Line (album), a box set by The Klinik
- "End of the Line" (Honeyz song)
- "End of the Line" (Traveling Wilburys song)
- "End of the Line", a song by The Allman Brothers Band from Shades of Two Worlds
- "End of the Line", a song by Arch Enemy from Anthems of Rebellion
- "End of the Line", a song by Boy & Bear from Harlequin Dream
- "End of the Line", a song by Concrete Blonde from Mexican Moon
- "End of the Line", a song by DevilDriver from The Fury of Our Maker's Hand
- "End of the Line", a song by Frozen Ghost from Frozen Ghost
- "The End of the Line", a song by Galneryus from Into the Purgatory
- "End of the Line", a song by J. J. Cale from Travel-Log
- "The End of the Line", a song by Metallica from Death Magnetic
- "End of the Line", a song by Negative
- "The End of the Line", a song by The Offspring from Americana
- "End of the Line", a song by Overkill from Under the Influence
- "End of the Line", a song by Pain from Rebirth
- "End of the Line", a song by Roxy Music from Siren
- "End of the Line", a song by Status Quo from In the Army Now
- "The End of the Line", a song by Warmen from Here for None

== Film, television, literature ==
- The End of the Line (1957 film), a crime film by Charles Saunders
- End of the Line (1987 film), a drama film by Jay Russell
- End of the Line (2007 film), a horror film by Maurice Devereaux
- The End of the Line, a 2007 young-adult novel by Gary Crew
- The End of the Line (book), a 2004 book by Charles Clover
- The End of the Line (2009 film), a documentary film based on the book by Charles Clover
- "End of the Line", a 2003 episode of Digimon Frontier
- "End of the Line" (Fear the Walking Dead), a 2019 television episode
- "End of the Line" (Vice Principals), an episode of the American TV series Vice Principals
- "End of the Line", a 1999 episode of Godzilla: The Series
- "The End of the Line" (Never the Twain), a 1983 television episode
- "End of the Line" (New Tricks), a 2011 television episode
- End of the Line..., British comic strip

== See also ==
- Newline or end-of-line character, a special character or sequence of characters signifying the end of a line of text
- Finish line (disambiguation)
