= 1991 Champion Spark Plug 500 =

13th race of the 1991 NASCAR Winston Cup Series

Race details
- Race 13 of 29 in the 1991 NASCAR Winston Cup Series
- The 1991 Champion Spark Plug 500 program cover, featuring Harry Gant.
- Date: June 16, 1991
- Official name: 10th Annual Champion Spark Plug 500
- Location: Long Pond, Pennsylvania, Pocono Raceway
- Course: Permanent racing facility
- Course length: 2.5 miles (4.0 km)
- Distance: 200 laps, 500 mi (804.672 km)
- Scheduled distance: 200 laps, 500 mi (804.672 km)
- Average speed: 122.666 miles per hour (197.412 km/h)

Pole position
Driver	Mark Martin	Roush Racing
- Time: 55.557

Most laps led
Driver	Ernie Irvan	Morgan-McClure Motorsports
- Laps: 38

Winner
No. 17	Darrell Waltrip	Darrell Waltrip Motorsports

Television in the United States
- Network: ESPN
- Announcers: Bob Jenkins, Ned Jarrett

Radio in the United States
- Radio: Motor Racing Network

The 1991 Champion Spark Plug 500 was the 13th stock car race of the 1991 NASCAR Winston Cup Series season and the tenth iteration of the event. The race was held on Sunday, June 16, 1991, in Long Pond, Pennsylvania, at Pocono Raceway, a 2.5 miles (4.0 km) triangular permanent course. The race took the scheduled 200 laps to complete. In the final laps of the race, owner-driver Darrell Waltrip would mount a late-race charge for the lead, passing with 18 laps to go in the race to take his 81st career NASCAR Winston Cup Series victory and his second and final victory of the season. To fill out the top three, Richard Childress Racing driver Dale Earnhardt and Roush Racing driver Mark Martin would finish second and third, respectively.

== Background ==
The layout of Pocono International Raceway, the venue where the race was held.

The race was held at Pocono International Raceway, which is a three-turn superspeedway located in Long Pond, Pennsylvania. The track hosts two annual NASCAR Sprint Cup Series races, as well as one Xfinity Series and Camping World Truck Series event. Until 2019, the track also hosted an IndyCar Series race.

Pocono International Raceway is one of a very few NASCAR tracks not owned by either Speedway Motorsports, Inc. or International Speedway Corporation. It is operated by the Igdalsky siblings Brandon, Nicholas, and sister Ashley, and cousins Joseph IV and Chase Mattioli, all of whom are third-generation members of the family-owned Mattco Inc, started by Joseph II and Rose Mattioli.

Outside of the NASCAR races, the track is used throughout the year by the Sports Car Club of America (SCCA) and motorcycle clubs as well as racing schools and an IndyCar race. The triangular oval also has three separate infield sections of racetrack – North Course, East Course and South Course. Each of these infield sections use a separate portion of the tri-oval to complete the track. During regular non-race weekends, multiple clubs can use the track by running on different infield sections. Also some of the infield sections can be run in either direction, or multiple infield sections can be put together – such as running the North Course and the South Course and using the tri-oval to connect the two.

=== Entry list ===
- (R) denotes rookie driver.

#	Driver	Team	Make
1	Rick Mast	Precision Products Racing	Oldsmobile
2	Rusty Wallace	Penske Racing South	Pontiac
3	Dale Earnhardt	Richard Childress Racing	Chevrolet
4	Ernie Irvan	Morgan–McClure Motorsports	Chevrolet
5	Ricky Rudd	Hendrick Motorsports	Chevrolet
6	Mark Martin	Roush Racing	Ford
7	Alan Kulwicki	AK Racing	Ford
8	Rick Wilson	Stavola Brothers Racing	Buick
9	Bill Elliott	Melling Racing	Ford
10	Derrike Cope	Whitcomb Racing	Chevrolet
12	Hut Stricklin	Bobby Allison Motorsports	Buick
13	Randy LaJoie	Golden Annie Racing	Buick
15	Morgan Shepherd	Bud Moore Engineering	Ford
17	Darrell Waltrip	Darrell Waltrip Motorsports	Chevrolet
19	Chad Little	Little Racing	Ford
21	Dale Jarrett	Wood Brothers Racing	Ford
22	Sterling Marlin	Junior Johnson & Associates	Ford
24	Mickey Gibbs	Team III Racing	Pontiac
25	Ken Schrader	Hendrick Motorsports	Chevrolet
26	Brett Bodine	King Racing	Buick
28	Davey Allison	Robert Yates Racing	Ford
30	Michael Waltrip	Bahari Racing	Pontiac
33	Harry Gant	Leo Jackson Motorsports	Oldsmobile
41	Larry Pearson	Larry Hedrick Motorsports	Chevrolet
42	Bobby Hillin Jr.	SABCO Racing	Pontiac
43	Richard Petty	Petty Enterprises	Pontiac
48	James Hylton	Hylton Motorsports	Chevrolet
52	Jimmy Means	Jimmy Means Racing	Pontiac
55	Ted Musgrave (R)	U.S. Racing	Pontiac
66	Lake Speed	Cale Yarborough Motorsports	Pontiac
68	Bobby Hamilton (R)	TriStar Motorsports	Oldsmobile
70	J. D. McDuffie	McDuffie Racing	Pontiac
71	Dave Marcis	Marcis Auto Racing	Chevrolet
75	Joe Ruttman	RahMoc Enterprises	Oldsmobile
94	Terry Labonte	Hagan Racing	Oldsmobile
97	Geoff Bodine	Junior Johnson & Associates	Ford
98	Jimmy Spencer	Travis Carter Enterprises	Chevrolet

== Qualifying ==
Qualifying was split into two rounds. The first round was held on Friday, June 14, at 3:00 PM EST. Each driver would have one lap to set a time. During the first round, the top 15 drivers in the round would be guaranteed a starting spot in the race. If a driver was not able to guarantee a spot in the first round, they had the option to scrub their time from the first round and try and run a faster lap time in a second round qualifying run, held on Saturday, June 15, at 10:30 AM EST. As with the first round, each driver would have one lap to set a time. For this specific race, positions 16-40 would be decided on time, and depending on who needed it, a select amount of positions were given to cars who had not otherwise qualified but were high enough in owner's points; up to two provisionals were given. If needed, a past champion who did not qualify on either time or provisionals could use a champion's provisional, adding one more spot to the field.

Mark Martin, driving for Roush Racing, would win the pole, setting a time of 55.557 and an average speed of 161.996 miles per hour (260.707 km/h) in the first round.

No drivers would fail to qualify.

=== Full qualifying results ===
Pos.	#	Driver	Team	Make	Time	Speed
1	6	Mark Martin	Roush Racing	Ford	55.557	161.996
2	7	Alan Kulwicki	AK Racing	Ford	55.585	161.914
3	4	Ernie Irvan	Morgan–McClure Motorsports	Chevrolet	55.911	160.970
4	5	Ricky Rudd	Hendrick Motorsports	Chevrolet	55.946	160.869
5	30	Michael Waltrip	Bahari Racing	Pontiac	56.100	160.428
6	10	Derrike Cope	Whitcomb Racing	Chevrolet	56.111	160.396
7	25	Ken Schrader	Hendrick Motorsports	Chevrolet	56.170	160.228
8	33	Harry Gant	Leo Jackson Motorsports	Oldsmobile	56.173	160.219
9	2	Rusty Wallace	Penske Racing South	Pontiac	56.203	160.134
10	28	Davey Allison	Robert Yates Racing	Ford	56.291	159.883
11	8	Rick Wilson	Stavola Brothers Racing	Buick	56.314	159.818
12	15	Morgan Shepherd	Bud Moore Engineering	Ford	56.383	159.623
13	17	Darrell Waltrip	Darrell Waltrip Motorsports	Chevrolet	56.460	159.405
14	94	Terry Labonte	Hagan Racing	Oldsmobile	56.463	159.396
15	9	Bill Elliott	Melling Racing	Ford	56.483	159.340
Failed to lock in Round 1
16	22	Sterling Marlin	Junior Johnson & Associates	Ford	56.586	159.050
17	12	Hut Stricklin	Bobby Allison Motorsports	Buick	56.632	158.921
18	97	Geoff Bodine	Junior Johnson & Associates	Ford	56.680	158.786
19	66	Lake Speed	Cale Yarborough Motorsports	Pontiac	56.682	158.781
20	26	Brett Bodine	King Racing	Buick	56.718	158.680
21	3	Dale Earnhardt	Richard Childress Racing	Chevrolet	56.745	158.604
22	42	Bobby Hillin Jr.	SABCO Racing	Pontiac	56.759	158.565
23	43	Richard Petty	Petty Enterprises	Pontiac	56.811	158.420
24	1	Rick Mast	Precision Products Racing	Oldsmobile	57.033	157.803
25	21	Dale Jarrett	Wood Brothers Racing	Ford	57.073	157.693
26	75	Joe Ruttman	RahMoc Enterprises	Oldsmobile	57.253	157.197
27	98	Jimmy Spencer	Travis Carter Enterprises	Chevrolet	57.268	157.156
28	41	Larry Pearson	Larry Hedrick Motorsports	Chevrolet	57.275	157.137
29	71	Dave Marcis	Marcis Auto Racing	Chevrolet	57.626	156.180
30	19	Chad Little	Little Racing	Ford	57.642	156.136
31	24	Mickey Gibbs	Team III Racing	Pontiac	57.848	155.580
32	55	Ted Musgrave (R)	U.S. Racing	Pontiac	57.859	155.551
33	52	Jimmy Means	Jimmy Means Racing	Pontiac	58.133	154.817
34	68	Bobby Hamilton (R)	TriStar Motorsports	Oldsmobile	58.996	152.553
35	48	James Hylton	Hylton Motorsports	Chevrolet	1:00.526	148.696
36	70	J. D. McDuffie	McDuffie Racing	Pontiac	1:00.715	148.234
37	13	Randy LaJoie	Golden Annie Racing	Buick	-	-
Official first round qualifying results
Official starting lineup

== Race results ==
Fin	St	#	Driver	Team	Make	Laps	Led	Status	Pts	Winnings
1	13	17	Darrell Waltrip	Darrell Waltrip Motorsports	Chevrolet	200	34	running	180	$60,650
2	21	3	Dale Earnhardt	Richard Childress Racing	Chevrolet	200	28	running	175	$43,775
3	1	6	Mark Martin	Roush Racing	Ford	200	6	running	170	$38,875
4	8	33	Harry Gant	Leo Jackson Motorsports	Oldsmobile	200	16	running	165	$22,600
5	18	97	Geoff Bodine	Junior Johnson & Associates	Ford	200	1	running	160	$15,125
6	3	4	Ernie Irvan	Morgan–McClure Motorsports	Chevrolet	200	38	running	160	$17,900
7	7	25	Ken Schrader	Hendrick Motorsports	Chevrolet	200	16	running	151	$13,200
8	16	22	Sterling Marlin	Junior Johnson & Associates	Ford	200	27	running	147	$9,900
9	12	15	Morgan Shepherd	Bud Moore Engineering	Ford	200	0	running	138	$14,300
10	6	10	Derrike Cope	Whitcomb Racing	Chevrolet	200	0	running	134	$19,200
11	23	43	Richard Petty	Petty Enterprises	Pontiac	200	0	running	130	$10,450
12	10	28	Davey Allison	Robert Yates Racing	Ford	200	1	running	132	$14,800
13	11	8	Rick Wilson	Stavola Brothers Racing	Buick	200	0	running	124	$9,900
14	27	98	Jimmy Spencer	Travis Carter Enterprises	Chevrolet	200	12	running	126	$10,600
15	22	42	Bobby Hillin Jr.	SABCO Racing	Pontiac	200	0	running	118	$13,250
16	2	7	Alan Kulwicki	AK Racing	Ford	200	0	running	115	$12,500
17	19	66	Lake Speed	Cale Yarborough Motorsports	Pontiac	200	0	running	112	$9,000
18	5	30	Michael Waltrip	Bahari Racing	Pontiac	200	3	running	114	$8,600
19	25	21	Dale Jarrett	Wood Brothers Racing	Ford	200	0	running	106	$8,250
20	4	5	Ricky Rudd	Hendrick Motorsports	Chevrolet	199	16	running	108	$13,025
21	14	94	Terry Labonte	Hagan Racing	Oldsmobile	199	0	running	100	$7,750
22	26	75	Joe Ruttman	RahMoc Enterprises	Oldsmobile	197	0	running	97	$7,600
23	30	19	Chad Little	Little Racing	Ford	197	0	running	94	$4,550
24	29	71	Dave Marcis	Marcis Auto Racing	Chevrolet	197	0	running	91	$7,350
25	24	1	Rick Mast	Precision Products Racing	Oldsmobile	196	0	running	88	$7,800
26	33	52	Jimmy Means	Jimmy Means Racing	Pontiac	176	1	running	90	$4,400
27	32	55	Ted Musgrave (R)	U.S. Racing	Pontiac	174	1	engine	87	$5,800
28	17	12	Hut Stricklin	Bobby Allison Motorsports	Buick	163	0	engine	79	$6,975
29	37	13	Randy LaJoie	Golden Annie Racing	Buick	154	0	sway bar	76	$4,250
30	31	24	Mickey Gibbs	Team III Racing	Pontiac	145	0	crash	73	$4,850
31	9	2	Rusty Wallace	Penske Racing South	Pontiac	115	0	engine	70	$4,775
32	28	41	Larry Pearson	Larry Hedrick Motorsports	Chevrolet	72	0	camshaft	67	$4,100
33	20	26	Brett Bodine	King Racing	Buick	57	0	oil pan	64	$6,600
34	36	70	J. D. McDuffie	McDuffie Racing	Pontiac	49	0	handling	61	$3,925
35	34	68	Bobby Hamilton (R)	TriStar Motorsports	Oldsmobile	47	0	crash	58	$4,100
36	15	9	Bill Elliott	Melling Racing	Ford	44	0	valve	55	$11,775
37	35	48	James Hylton	Hylton Motorsports	Chevrolet	14	0	engine	52	$3,700
Official race results

== Standings after the race ==
Drivers' Championship standings

	Pos	Driver	Points
	1	Dale Earnhardt	2,037
	2	Ricky Rudd	1,917 (-120)
1	3	Darrell Waltrip	1,842 (-195)
1	4	Ken Schrader	1,817 (–220)
	5	Ernie Irvan	1,814 (–223)
	6	Davey Allison	1,769 (–268)
	7	Harry Gant	1,767 (–270)
1	8	Mark Martin	1,685 (–352)
1	9	Michael Waltrip	1,631 (–406)
1	10	Morgan Shepherd	1,575 (–462)
Official driver's standings

- Note: Only the first 10 positions are included for the driver standings.

Previous race: 1991 Banquet Frozen Foods 300	NASCAR Winston Cup Series; 1991 season	Next race: 1991 Miller Genuine Draft 400 (Michigan)
