= "Pistol" Jim =

Publication information
- Publisher: Gran Chicos; Plaza El Coyote
- First appearance: 1944
- Created by: Carlos Freixas

"Pistol" Jim is a western series of comics created In 1944 by Carlos Freixas and is the most famous of his creations.

== History ==
Carlos Freixas created the series with Emilio Freixas and Ángel Puigmiquel. Jim's adventures appeared in Gran Chicos and later Plaza El Coyote.

== Appearance and main characters ==
"Pistol" Jim is a vigilante, who wears black (like Hopalong Cassidy) and wears the emblem of a revolver on his chest.

He is joined on his adventures by his freckly sidekick Nick Rolly.

Noted amongst the villains he faces, the sophisticated Belle Smith stands out.

== Style ==
In the opinion of the researcher Luis Gasca, "Pistol" Jim combines the influence of the styles of Emilio Freixas and Alex Raymond.
