= Jinty (comics) =

Weekly British comic for girls

- Cover from issue of Jinty, 19 August 1978. Art by Guy Peeters.

Publication information
- Publisher: IPC Magazines, Fleetway Publications
- Schedule: Weekly
- Publication date: 11 May 1974 – 21 November 1981
- No. of issues: 393

Creative team
- Written by: Pat Mills, Malcolm Shaw, Jay Over, Terence Magee
- Artist(s): Phil Gascoine, Guy Peeters, Jim Baikie, Philip Townsend, Keith Robson, Audrey Fawley, José Casanovas, Trini Tinturé, Rodrigo Comos
- Editor: Mavis Miller

Collected editions
- Jinty Vol. 1: The Human Zoo & The Land of No Tears: ISBN 978-1781086247
- Fran of the Floods: ISBN 978-1781086728
- The Concrete Surfer: ISBN 978-1781087633

Jinty was a weekly British comic for girls published by Fleetway in London from 1974 to 1981, at which point it merged with Tammy. It had previously merged with Lindy and Penny in a similar fashion, illustrating the 'hatch-match-dispatch' process practiced by editorial staff in the London comics publisher.

As well as the weekly comic, Christmas annuals were also published. While there were similarities with its Fleetway stablemates Tammy and Misty, each comic had its own focus, with Jinty concentrating on science fiction or otherwise fantastical stories.

== Publishing format ==
As with other girls' comics of the time, Jinty consisted of a collection of many small strips. A typical weekly issue would publish six or seven serial stories, each consisting of around three or four pages of story ending in a cliff-hanger. The first page of the story included a text-box briefly summarizing the story so far, while the final page included a teaser line of text for the next week's episode.

In addition to the serial stories, a few standalone strips were normally published. Usually, these were humorous and featured the same lead character week after week. Alley Cat, Penny Crayon, and others were a single page long, while Sue's Fantastic Fun-Bag! ran to two pages each week. A lead strip in the early days, often taking the cover slot, was The Jinx From St Jonah's, which normally featured a standalone story but occasionally continued it in a subsequent week. An exception to the humour format was the storyteller format, in which the same narrator would each week tell a different spooky or eerie story. In Jinty, that narrator was the character Gypsy Rose. (Note: A Resource on Jinty blog claims that the stories introduced by Gypsy Rose in Jinty were repackaged reprints from The Strangest Stories Ever Told strip which had previously been published in June and Tammy.)

Other features includes a letters page, horoscopes, occasional text stories, feature articles on pop or media stars, and various articles on creative things to make and do.

Jinty was printed on newsprint using at most two colours on internal pages and a four-colour process on the external cover pages.

Jinty also merged with Lindy during 1976 and carried into 1977.

== Contributors ==
Artists and writers were not credited in Jinty. Artists can be identified by their work in other comics, whether girls comics such as Tammy (which moved to a system of crediting creators in the early 1980s) or in boys' comics such as 2000AD, which brought such a policy in from earlier on. In other cases, it is possible to identify the artists from signatures on the comics page. Identification of writers in Jinty is currently dependent on information given by the writers themselves.

Mavis Miller was the editor.

=== Artists ===
Artists featured in the pages of Jinty included:

- Phil Gascoine — in each issue from the very first until the last, from Gail's Indian Necklace to Badgered Belinda. Gascoine was the artist for No Cheers for Cherry, and Fran of the Floods
- Guy Peeters — Land of No Tears, Black Sheep of the Bartons, I'll Make up for Mary, Slave of the Swan, The Human Zoo, Worlds Apart, and Pandora's Box
- Jim Baikie — Left-Out Linda, Face The Music, Flo!, Ping-Pong Paula, Miss No-Name, Willa on Wheels, Rose Among the Thornes, Spell of the Spinning Wheel, Two Mothers for Maggie, Wild Rose, and The Forbidden Garden
- Philip Townsend — Somewhere over the Rainbow, Mark of the Witch!, Children of Stepford, and Song of the Fir Tree
- Carlos Freixas (Valley of the Shining Mist)
- Keith Robson
- Audrey Fawley — Made Up Mandy
- José Casanovas, Trini Tinturé, Rodrigo Comos, and many other Spanish artists
- Christine Ellingham - Concrete Surfer
- Cándido Ruiz Prieto - Kerry in the clouds, and Scepter of the Toltecs.

=== Writers ===
Writers featured included:

- Pat Mills — Land of No Tears, Girl in a Bubble, Concrete Surfer
- Malcolm Shaw — The Robot Who Cried
- Jay Over — Pam of Pond Hill
- Terence Magee — Merry At Misery House

== Themes and key stories ==
While many of the stories published in Jinty were realistically based in everyday life (such as Pam of Pond Hill, an episodic tale of a young girl at a Comprehensive school), it differentiated itself from other comics in printing more stories with a science-fictional or fantastical focus.

- The Robot Who Cried (artist Comos, writer Malcolm Shaw): robot KT-5 is built in the shape of a human girl and escapes to find her freedom and to discover human emotions.
- Girl in a Bubble (artist Phil Gascoine, writer Pat Mills): the sinister Miss Vaal is keeping Helen Ryan in a plastic bubble. This is supposedly because Helen has no immunity to germs, but in reality, Miss Vaal wants to study the effects of being cut off from the outside world.
- Battle of the Wills (artist Trini): a girl discovers a scientist with a duplicating machine that enables her to continue with her gymnastics while her double is forced to do ballet.
- Land of No Tears (artist Guy Peeters, writer Pat Mills): During an operation, lame Cassy Shaw is transported to a future world where people who are less than utterly perfect are treated as second-class citizens. In the hive (children's home) where Cassy ends up, the Gamma girls are slaves who do the cleaning, wear shabby clothes, eat nothing but scraps left by the perfect Alpha girls and are forced to share a cold, grim dormitory. Nevertheless, Cassy quickly revolts against this harsh treatment and urges the Gamma girls to train at sports in order to beat the Alphas and win the Golden Girl award, proving that 'rejects' like them can't safely be despised and humiliated.
- The Human Zoo (artist Guy Peeters, writer Pat Mills): twin girls and their classmates are kidnapped by telepathic aliens to whom humans are mere animals. The treatment the humans receive parallels the treatment meted out to animals on Earth (zoos, circuses, slaughterhouses, bloodsports, vivisection, and beasts of burden).
- Paula's Puppets- Paula Richards' father is convicted of burning down his toy factory for the insurance. The Phillipses, the foster-family Paula is staying with, are wonderful, but the townsfolk ostracise Paula because their jobs depended on the factory. At the burnt-out factory Paula finds some mysterious wax puppets and finds they act like voodoo dolls, and she can make things happen to whoever she makes the puppets resemble. At first, the bitter Paula uses them to exact revenge, but eventually, she realises she can use them to help her father.
- Worlds Apart (artist Guy Peeters): After an accident with a road tanker carrying dangerous chemicals from a secret government research establishment, six schoolgirls find themselves in a series of strange worlds governed by their main characteristics: greed (Sarah), love of sport (Ann), vanity (Samantha), delinquency (Mo), intellectualism (Clare), and fear (Jilly). The only release from these worlds is for its respective creator to die – and this happens when each creator meets her downfall through the very same characteristic that shaped her world.
- Gail's Indian Necklace- Gail falls under the thrall of an evil necklace she buys in a jumble sale. It grants some desires that are unspoken, or socially wrong — if she can't afford something, for example, it makes her steal it.
- The Slave of Form 3B- Nervous Tania is a new pupil at Waverley boarding school, where she comes under the thrall of interfering know-all Stacey. Stacey's discovery that she can exert hypnotic control over the weak-willed Tania leads her down a very dark path. Her early experiments with this newly discovered power merely subject Tania to a series of embarrassing practical jokes; however, soon Tania is doing all of Stacey's assignments, cheating, stealing, sabotaging sports rivals and being systematically cut off from other potential friends and all possible avenues of help. Stacey will stop at nothing to become Waverley's next "Girl of the Year" and, when Tania discovers the truth and tries to fight back, resorts to malevolent tactics of mind control that put Tania's very life in danger...
- Life's a Ball for Nadine: Greystreet School's netball team needs another good player and they find it in the new girl, Nadine Nash. However Nadine is more interested in disco-dancing than netball. Although she eventually joins the team and finds netball helping her disco-dancing and vice versa, she still cares more for disco-dancing than helping the team – until two rivals set out to cheat her at both!
- Creepy Crawley: Top girl Jean Crawley finds herself under threat from a new girl. Jean unleashes the power of an Egyptian scarab brooch to get rid of her rival. Before long, however, the brooch is using Jean to launch an invasion of insects.
- A Spell of Trouble: Carrie Black comes from a long line of witches. But trouble looms in the form of her cousin, Angela White.
- Child of the Rain: After a trip to the Amazon rainforest, Gemma West (who had previously hated rain), finds that she is filled with a mysterious energy when it rains.
- Minnow: For some strange reason, Minna's mother is against her learning to swim. Furthermore, Minna begins to experience terrifying visions of drowning, but despite it, she defies her mother and has secret swimming lessons.
- Gertie Grit, the Hateful Brit! — In Roman times, the ghastly Gertie Grit steals a druid's talisman that can send her through time. Wherever Gertie lands, she changes the course of history.
- Who's That in My Mirror? — Magda Morrice has the face of an angel but the heart of a devil. She schemes her way to anything she wants and her pretty face belies it all to everyone. But when she her way into acquiring a mirror she fancies, she is surprised to find that it reflects two images of her! The second face takes a hand in helping Magda with her schemes, but it also grows increasingly ugly, evil-looking and frightening. Magda realizes what is happening, and decides to change so the reflection will be pretty too. But she soon finds she cannot change the things she has started without getting into trouble.
- The Mystery of Martine — when Martine Freeman starts playing the part of a deranged, obsessive woman in a play called "the Demon Within", her behaviour changes and she starts behaving like the deranged woman in real life. Almost as if ...there WAS a demon within.
- The Haunting of Form 2b Form 2b is mysteriously reverting to a Victorian pattern.
- Then there were 3... — Ten girls hire a narrow boat, and weird things start happening.
- Spirit of the Lake — Karen Carstairs and her mother find themselves unpaid help when they come to stay with their relatives, the Grahams. And snooty cousin Cynthia sneers at Karen for not being able to skate while she is the best skater in the county. But then a fairy godmother appears in the form of the mysterious woman on the lake who starts teaching Karen to skate.
- Mark of the Witch!: Emma Fielding is persecuted because of the "black streak" that has made her family the village outcasts for generations. She puts up with it as long as possible, but finally snaps and decides to be the bad person the villagers claim she is.
- Spell of the Spinning Wheel — After Rowan Lindsay pricks her finger on an evil spinning wheel, any humming noise sends her to sleep. This starts interfering with her running career. To make matters worse, her mother needs the wheel to earn money for the family, so it can't be gotten rid of.
- Sceptre of the Toltecs- Jenny Marlow's archaeologist parents return from Mexico with a strange, golden eyed girl named Malincha, who possesses strange powers.
- Sue's Fantastic Fun-Bag!- At a jumble sale. Sue Lawton notices a handbag that came from the Mysterious Orient. Her mother does not think much of it, but Sue buys it and calls it Henrietta, saying it has personality. Sue eventually catches on that Henrietta is a magic handbag. She can put spells on things that Sue puts into her. So Sue has to be careful what she puts in there. If Henrietta does not like what is put into her or gets mischievous over it, Sue or someone else will pay the price.
- Pandora's Box — Vain, self-centred Pandora Carr is confident she has acting talent, but her witchy guardian insists on giving her a box of magic potions to help her along.
- The Forbidden Garden — Set in a future world where mankind has poisoned the earth so no plants can grow, creating a grim, disciplined world ruled by castes and strict rationing of limited supplies, and harsh measures such as killing pets to stretch food supplies and imprisonment for curfew breakers and water-stealers. Amid this bleakness Laika Severn discovers an oasis of fertility in the Forbidden Zone and breaks the law to grow a flower for her dying sister. Unfortunately growing the flower requires breaking the stern laws of the period. If Laika is discovered, she will be sent to a detention centre.
- Slave of the Mirror — Mia Blake finds an old mirror in her house and it makes her turn against her sister. The mirror possesses her and makes her destroy things in the house, sabotaging her sister's attempt to run a boarding house.
- Wenna the Witch — Wenna is persecuted in a village that still believes in witches.
- Daughter of Dreams- Sally Carter is a wall-flower until she makes up an imaginary friend, Pauline Starr. Her imagination is so strong she can see her new friend clearly – so clearly in fact that Pauline comes to life! Pauline helps to shake up Sally's life by getting her to do more lively things so she can make more friends.
- Children of Edenford — Insane headmistress Purity Goodfellow is obsessed with perfection. To this end she turns her pupils into glazed-eyed docile zombies by feeding them drugged food.
- The Zodiac Prince — The King of the Zodiac sends his son to hand out gifts to any girl he pleases.
- A Girl Called Gulliver — Gwenny Gulliver is looking after the last of the Lilliputians.
- Alice in a Strange Land — Alice Jones is considered a wet blanket until she and her classmates crash-land in a Peruvian jungle and find themselves prisoners of a weird Inca culture.
- Almost Human — Xenia is an alien who looks entirely human. As her planet is dying from lack of water, her mother and father take her for a picnic on Earth and then leave her there, with a communication pendant so that they can stay in contact with her. They think she will do well on Earth because she is stronger, faster, and more intelligent than humans are; but what they don't know is that her alien life-force is too strong for earth life, and anything that she touches will be zapped stone dead! Then a lightning strike hits her and drains enough of her life force that she no longer kills Earth creatures with her lightest touch, but her vital energies ebb lower and lower until she is herself at death's door.
- The Girl Who Never Was: Conceited Tina Williams learns a humility lesson when she is cast into a parallel world ruled by magic. Then disaster strikes when Tina unwittingly casts a forbidden spell. She must return to her own world, or face a sentence of eternity as a statue.
- Guardian of White Horse Hill — Janey Summers is an orphan, with foster parents who she is hoping will go on to adopt her. However, life with her new family is not easy, but things change for the better when she meets a mysterious white horse no one else can see, and who can make Janey invisible to those around her when seated on the back of the horse.
- When Statues Walk... — Viking statues come to life to stop Laura Ashbourne from helping a beautiful woman she can see in a mysterious pendant – but things are not what they seem.
- Destiny Brown — Destiny Brown is the seventh child of a seventh child. When she turns 14, Destiny develops powers of precognition.
- Cursed to be a Coward! — Marnie Miles is being harassed by a deranged gypsy woman who foretells that she will "end up in blue water". Marnie takes this to mean she will drown someday — and the gypsy woman is determined to make sure that she does.
- House of the Past — Time-travel to 1933.
- Horse from the Sea — an actual horse from the sea, who appears every time the heir of Penrose is in danger.
- Golden Dolly, Death Dust! — Miss Marvell the witch is threatening all green things with her "death dust". So two girls, along with their corn dolly (which comes to life) must find all the ingredients to make a counter spell.
- The Haunting of Hazel — When Hazel arrives in the village of Black Crag, she finds that the Black Crag in question has been casting a shadow over the village for centuries. Then Hazel finds she has a connection with the Crag that might put an end to its evil.
- The Valley of Shining Mist — Debbie Lane has been so psychologically damaged by the abuse from her adoptive family that she has become wild and thieving and has no confidence, which is reflected in a stammer. Then Debbie discovers confidence and can talk properly when she discovers the magical Valley of Shining Mist. But she soon finds that she has to learn to function that way outside the valley as well.
- Dance Into Darkness — Della Benson envies the disco dancing ability of Rozelle and wishes she could dance like that. Rozelle tells Della that she will be able to – if she is willing to pay the price. The price is that Della must carry the curse that Rozelle's family has suffered since Medieval times — a curse that turns the victim into a creature of darkness. They can only live in the dark, and cannot stand light, which blinds them, and they cannot even function in the daytime without wearing dark glasses. For Della, there is an additional problem with the curse – whenever she hears disco music, she cannot stop dancing until it stops.
- Shadow on the Fen — Linden James and her family have just moved to the village of Wychley Green. Linden misses her old home and isn't making friends because they think she's standoffish. But then a girl from the 17th century appears. Her name is Rebecca Neville and her evil cousin, Matthew Hobley "The Witchfinder", has accused her of witchcraft. Rebecca moves in with Linden, but soon there are warning signs that Hobley has followed Rebecca into the 20th century. And Linden, who is confident that Hobley can't stir up people against Rebecca in this period because people no longer believe in witches, is soon to learn otherwise.
- Sea-Sister: When Jane Bush and her parents move into Viewpoint Cottage, they repair the wall with a stone slab, not realising it comes from the village of Ullapool, lost a hundred years before. Helen, a spirit from the drowned village, is sent to retrieve the slab.

Some published stories show a strong environmental concern.

- Fran of the Floods (artist Phil Gascoine): The earth has gotten hotter, which melts ice caps and evaporates oceans, and triggers worldwide torrents of rain that never seem to stop. Dams break down, people on lower levels start to flee as their towns vanish under the ever-rising waters, parts of the coast return to the sea, and then there are power cuts, food shortages, stockpiling, panic buying and looting, fuel shortages and stoppages, and higher levels are being swamped with refugees. During a school concert, the waters overcome the reservoir and come rolling in. In the ensuing chaos, Fran is separated from her parents and best friend Jill, and thinks they have died. She sets out on a dangerous journey north to Scotland to be reunited with her sister June, accompanied by a young girl called Sarah and her pet rabbit Fluffy.
- Jassy's Wand of Power (artist Keith Robson): this time, climate change has led to a drought. Jassy has a quasi-supernatural power of dowsing for water, but finds herself the focus of unwelcome attention as a water diviner in a society where such talents are regarded as "witchcraft"
- The Goose Girl (artist Keith Robson): Glenda is at constant war at her mother over birds — the former is a born ornithologist and the latter has a pathological hatred of birds.
- The Green People (artist Phil Gascoine): the protagonist fights against plans to build a new road, which will endanger her newly acquired telepathic friends from a forgotten green and subterranean race.
- The Big Cat — Ruth protects a cheetah from a cruel circus owner by disappearing with it, hiding it in an abandoned warehouse while she works at a nursery to pay for its food. But the owner is not pleased.
- Friends of the Forest — Sally Harris is trying to save a deer from being put in a circus.
- The Birds — inspired by the Alfred Hitchcock film of the same name, a chemical factory is opened, and causes the birds to start acting strangely, attacking animals and people.

Some stories focused on disabilities.

- Blind Ballerina: A girl is determined to become a ballerina, even though she is blind. Cited by comics writer Alan Moore as "cynical and possibly actually evil."
- Blind Faith — A blind horse is taught to show-jump.
- Clancy on Trial — After an accident, nobody expects Clancy Clarke to walk again. When she does (with her cousin's help) her grandfather decides to test her determination to see if she will make a worthy heir.
- Curtain of Silence — cycling star Yvonne Berridge thinks of nothing but winning — until the day she becomes mute and a prisoner in an Iron Curtain country. She is forced to cycle for the country under another identity (that of a lookalike who drowned) but is determined to escape.
- Finleg the Fox — Lame Una Price is sent to the Dray family at Blindwall Farm in the hope of a country cure for her poor health. But the Drays are not very welcoming, nor do they welcome Finleg, the fox Una befriends.
- The Darkening Journey- Thumper the dog has been separated from his blind mistress and sets out in search of her, suffering from bouts of blindness himself after a head injury.
- Wild Horse Summer — Daphne has been mute since an accident. While on holiday with relatives she befriends a wild horse, but a farm hand wants to destroy it, considering it dangerous.
- Willa on Wheels: The story of Willa, who uses a wheelchair.

Other stories covered ground seen in many traditional girls' comics.

Humour stories included:

- Bird-Girl Brenda — Brenda suddenly gains the ability to fly.
- Do-It-Yourself Dot — Dot is good at making things — make sailboats, ventriloquist dummies, jigsaw puzzles, etc. The trouble is, her inventions don't always work out as she planned.
- Dora Dogsbody(artist José Casanovas) — Dora is adopted by the Sneddons — to be the dogsbody in their dog hotel. But Dora always ends up having the last laugh on the Sneddons.
- Food for Fagin- Olivia Twist is allowed to have a dog — on condition that it doesn't cost much to feed. But Olivia soon finds she has seriously underestimated the appetite of her new dog, Fagin.
- Fran'll Fix It! (artist Jim Baikie): Fran Anderson, better known as Fran the Fixer, styles herself as a problem solver who can fix anything and her catchphrase is "‘s easy!". But it is not always as easy as Fran thinks, for her ideas of fixing things are crazy, madcap ones. For the most part they work out, but there is typically mayhem along the way, and sometimes things backfire on Fran. She has been expelled from several schools because of her ‘fixing', and her father threatens to pack her off to her aunts Toni and Chloe (or Tooth and Claw as Fran calls them) if it happens again. Luckily, her ability to use ventriloquism gets her out of trouble.
- Gaye's Gloomy Ghost — a funny regular feature with Gaye and Sir Roger, the ghost of a medieval knight who has problems with understanding modern times.
- Her Guardian Angel — Laughs galore with reckless Roz and her overzealous guardian angel, Gabby.
- The Jinx of St Jonahs — Katie Jinx is jinx by name, jinx by nature.
- The Snobs and the Scruffs — Each week the snobs from Snobville Academy try to prove their superiority over the scruffs from Scruffley Secondary next door: "We snobs are always on top! It's time those common scruffs realized that!" But the scruffs always win in the end.

Historical stories included:

- Bound for Botany Bay — Artistic Betsy Tanner and her father are transported to Australia.
- Merry at Misery House (Writer: Terence Magee)- In the 1920s Merry Summers is wrongly convicted of theft and is sent to a reformatory dubbed "Misery House", for the cruel, heartless and brutal personal. But however harsh they may be, they have met their match in Merry Summers, who refuses to let their cruelty change her chirpy ways or stop her smiling. But there is more than just cruelty afoot; Merry eventually discovers that House is running illegal rackets on top of its other evils. When Merry's rebelliousness puts this at risk, the Warden is prepared to go as far as murder to stop her.
- Slaves of the Candle — Victorian maidservant Lyndy Langtree stumbles across a candle-making racket operated by Mrs Tallow. Mrs Tallow uses child slave labour to make her candles and then uses her candle business to steal valuables. To silence Lyndy, Mrs Tallow frames her for theft as well as kidnapping her. Since there is now a very substantial price on Lyndy's head, escape will be pointless – but Mrs Tallow has underestimated the resourcefulness and determination of the girl who is determined to clear her name as well as shut down the candle racket.

More traditional stories included:

- 7 Steps to the Sisterhood — New girl Shelley Vernon is delighted to receive an invitation to join the secret society of the school, but she must pass seven tests if she is to join.
- A Boy Like Bobby — chaos when Tessa befriends two brothers.
- Alley Cat — A humor strip depicting the adventures of an alley cat and his human foes, the wealthy Muchloots.
- Always Together... — three orphans pretend to be gypsies to prevent welfare from breaking them up.
- Angela Angel-Face — sneaky, sweet-faced Angela Palmer becomes embroiled in a plot to kidnap a Meringarian princess. (This story is reprinted from Sandie.)
- Angela's Angels — A hospital soap opera focusing on Sister Angela Rodd and her six budding student nurses: Sharon, Lesley, Jo, Susannah, Helen and Liz, who are known at Spilsbury General Hospital as Angela's Angels.
- Badgered Belinda: Belinda Gibson is being bullied at a boarding school. On the brink of running away, she chooses to stay and secretly care for a set of orphaned badgers.
- Barracuda Bay — Susan Steven finds herself on the wrong side of some crooks when she goes on a treasure hunt in the Bahamas.
- Bet Gets the Bird!: Bet visits old Mrs Carter, a friend of her grandmother, and learns that Mrs Carter is going into a home and can't take her beloved parrot, Rosy Posy, with her. Bet asks Mrs Carter to let her take Rosy Posy, planning to find a home for Rosy Posy with one of the day girls at her boarding school, but when Rosy Posy's squawks get her mistakenly enrolled as one of the pupils, Bet has to hide the parrot and keep up the pretence of a pupil named Rosy Posy at the school.
- Black Sheep of the Bartons
- Bridey Below the Breadline — Bridey's father has been imprisoned after being wrongly accused of starting the Great Fire of London. Can Bridey's breadmaking help to clear him?
- Casey, Come Back! — Orphan Josie Stanton feels unloved by her stern grandfather, who shatters her world completely when he sells her beloved dog, Casey.
- Champion in Hiding — Mitzi Morris is forced to live with her horrible Aunt Shirley, who does not treat her well. Mitzi has to hide her dog Firefly from Aunt Shirley as she is determined to train him as a sheepdog champion, but Aunt Shirley is being paid to prevent this.
- Cinderella Smith: In all the years since Cindy Smith's mother died, her life has been a succession of flats and hotels. This time, Dad means Cindy to have a settled home while he is away, so he sends Cindy to live with her elderly and wealthy cousins, Jemima and Agnes. But the cousins abuse Cindy, forcing her to sleep in a shabby attic, making her wear tatty second hand clothes, not feeding her properly, and making her do all the work around the house. Luckily, Cindy finds a bit of respite from the hardships of her new life when she becomes a model, aided by her friend Kay's family.
- Combing Her Golden Hair — Tamsin Tregorren finds a silver comb that belonged to her mother which shows her visions and leads her to frolic in the water like a dolphin despite never having learned to swim. Eventually she is brought to the sea where she meets her mother, who is a mermaid, and who wants her to come and live in the sea too.
- Come Into My Parlour — Jody Sinclair is made to wear a cat's-paw necklace by an evil witch, who uses it to get revenge on the descendants of a judge who hanged her wicked ancestor. At first she is made to do things against her will as if she were a puppet, but her inconvenient conscience is eventually eliminated by changing her personality entirely.
- Concrete Surfer — Jean Everidge migrated with her parents to Australia, as Ten Pound Poms. Now Jean has returned alone to be looked after by relatives, with her parents making their way back slowly in failure. By contrast her cousin, Carol, is a winner: popular, rich, top of the class at school. And she means to keep it that way too, or so Jean suspects. There is one thing that Jean can shine at: skateboarding, or surfing the concrete waves.
- Daddy's Darling — Lee Simons has been living a sheltered life with her overprotective father. Then wartime forces Lee's father to send her to the village school and he finds he must take in evacuees.
- Daisy Drudge and Milady Maud — Through mischance, Lady Daisy de Vere is mistaken for a servant, Maud, and ends up in a cruel household where even the other servants mistreat her. Meanwhile, Maud is sent to the finishing school Daisy was supposed to attend, and finds the high life not as good as it appears to be.
- Darling Clementine- Promising water-skier Clemantine "Clem" is in hospital in a coma. Uncle Dave, having witnessed the accident from the wrong vantage-point, thinks Clem's cousin Ella deliberately caused Clem's accident, but the true culprit is Clem's snooty arch-rival, Val Lester.
- Desert Island Daisy — Victorian maidservant Daisy finds that class distinctions still apply, even when she and her employers become castaways on a desert island.
- Diving Belle — Highdiver Belle McBain loses her nerve after her father is presumed killed following an ocean diving accident. Then a gypsy diving instructor tells Belle she must learn to dive again as fast as possible, because an important mission depends on it.
- Dracula's Daughter — Mr Graves, an authoritarian grammar school master, disapproves of the free-and-easy methods at his daughter's school. So when Mr Graves becomes the headmaster, he forces his strict grammar-school methods down its throat in an over-zealous crusade to reform it into a strict grammar school.
- Face the Music, Flo! — Flo Carroll is afraid her brother's pursuit of a singing career will ruin him, and sets out after him.
- Fancy Free! — Fancy Cole is the most difficult pupil at Stockbotham Comprehensive. When Fancy runs away in search of a better life, she meets an old man who helps her discover caring, responsibility, and to grow up considerably.
- For Peter's Sake! — In pre-WWII Britain, Corrie and Dawn Lomax are delighted when they are presented with a baby brother, Peter. But then disaster strikes, when their father dies in a work accident, then Peter falls ill. As money is tight and Mrs Lomax has no time for her daughters, she accepts an invitation to send Corrie to Granny Mackie in Drumloan, Scotland. Granny has a pram called Old Peg, which has a reputation in the community for possessing curative powers for infants — any sick infant rocked in Old Peg seems to recover immediately. When Granny dies, Corrie finds a note in Old Peg saying "Push it to Peter", and the pram is equipped for a long journey. So Corrie begins a long journey of pushing Old Peg all the way from Scotland to Peter in London, sleeping in her at night, and having all sorts of adventures, mishaps and dangers on the way. She also has to keep ahead of the law, as she has been reported missing in Drumloan.
- Freda, False Friend: Freda is torn by conflicting loyalties when her policeman father orders her to spy on a friend's father, who is suspected of criminal activities.
- Freda's Fortune — Freda Potter thinks her dreams have come true when she wins a pony, but then come two big problems: Costs of maintaining the pony and snobby Susan Hamlin, who can't stand competition.
- Go on, Hate Me! — Hetty Blake loves athletics, especially running. When she and her friend Carol are picked for a relay at their athletics club, she starts training hard and pushes Carol to do the same. Carol ends up collapsing and is rushed to hospital, where she reveals that she has a heart condition that she had not told Hetty about and does not have long to live. Before Carol dies, she makes Hetty promise to win the relay and to look after her younger sister, Jo. Unfortunately, Jo overhears the guilt-stricken Hetty blaming herself and causes Hetty to become the victim of a hate campaign when she starts spreading the word around that Hetty caused Carol's death by driving Carol too hard. Worse, Hetty is stuck looking after Jo — and Jo is adamant about staying so she can make Hetty's life miserable.
- Gwen's Stolen Glory — Gwen Terry has no confidence in herself, is repeatedly teased by her classmates, and her father is on an invalid's benefit, so the family cannot afford a decent home. She envies the popular and confident Judith Langham, who has just been accepted for drama school. When the taunts go too far, the distraught Gwen runs away and falls over a cliff. Judith goes to the rescue, but through a series of unexpected turns, everyone thinks that it was Gwen who saved Judith, who is now unconscious after a fall. Gwen now has everything she dreamed of: popularity, admiring friends, Judith's place in the drama school, and a better home thanks to the gratitude of the Langhams. When Judith comes to, she has lost her memory, so it looks like Gwen's glory is sealed. But there is a price – Gwen cannot forget that it was really Judith who saved her life. Her troubled conscience gives her no peace of mind and she is ashamed at the depths she has sunk to, so all her new-found gains cannot give her full happiness.
- Gypsy Rose's Tales of Mystery and Magic - Gypsy Rose is the narrator of a long-running series of one-shot stories, in which she is often called in to solve a supernatural conundrum.
- Holiday Hideaway — Mr Jones has had to cancel his holiday because his business collapsed, but is too embarrassed to admit it to his neighbours. So he hides his entire family in the house and pretends they are on holiday.
- I'll Make up for Mary
- Is This Your Story? — One of Jinty's more unusual features. It was a true-life feature, and each week it would run a complete story that was based on common problems among girls. But unlike the teen magazines, it was not based on letters that readers had sent in where they recount their real-life experiences or outline a problem. The stories were composites of common real-life problems. If any reader had encountered a situation similar to the one in the story, they would see themselves in that story. If not, it might be a situation they were familiar with or a warning if they did encounter one.
- Jackie's Two Lives — Jackie Lester is discontented and fed up at missing out because her family is poor. One day, an argument with her family has Jackie running off, and she nearly gets run over by the rich Mrs Mandell, who has just moved into the district. Under pretext of making amends for the near-accident, Mrs Mandell lures Jackie away and turns her into a double of her late daughter, Isabella. Isabella had died because of her mother's obsession with her winning a riding trophy, and now that same obsession is putting Jackie's life in danger.
- Kerry in the Clouds: Kerry dreams of becoming an actress. But does she have what it takes or is she just a dreamer?
- Knight and Day — Pat Day is removed from her foster family because her natural mother, Mrs Knight, suddenly wants her back after years of ignoring her. But Pat soon finds that her mother only wants her so they can get a council flat, and her stepsister Janet is spiteful.
- Left-Out Linda — Linda feels unwanted and unloved when her mother remarries.
- Made-up Mandy — Mandy Mason works as a cleaner and caretaker at the glamorous Natalie Sylvan beauty salon run by the horrible Miss Agate and her crony Odile. Mandy makes life a little easier for herself and her fellow worker Nikki by using her knowledge of makeup and various clothes and wigs to disguise herself as various girls, each with their own personality.
- Make Believe Mandy- Mandy Miller is abused by her family who seem to hate her and compare her unfavorably with her sister Dinah. Mandy's only escape from reality is dressing-up in the clothes her family's second-hand clothes shop receives and imagining that she is a different person, and she particularly loves to pretend that she is a princess. Then one day, she answers an advert for an audition for a princess in an amateur play, and the producer, Miss Madden, promises Dinah a better life if she passes a series of tests of character – testing honesty, kindness, loyalty, self-sacrifice, courage and other virtues.
- Mike and Terry — A daredevil private detective and his girl helper go on the trail of criminal extraordinaire, the Shadow.
- Miss No-Name — Lori Mills loses her memory and becomes ensnared by Ma Crabb and her daughter Stella, who abuse her and force her into crime. For good measure, Ma Crabb cuts off Lori's hair so nobody recognises her as the missing girl in the papers.
- No Cheers for Cherry — Cherry Campbell's aunt brings her to her family theatre houseboat with the promise of drama training for the fame that Cherry wants. In reality, the family just want Cherry as an unpaid servant.
- No Medals for Marie: Marie Smart is being blackmailed into losing deliberately by her jealous godmother.
- No Time for Pat — a tear-jerker of a story about a girl who is living on borrowed time and using it to help a wheel-chair bound girl at the orphanage.
- Nothing to Sing About — When singing idol Gary Davis dies, his daughter Linette vows to shut all singing out of her life. Of course, expelling singing from her life isn't as easy as that.
- Pam of Pond Hill — Pam Watts brings us stories of what happened when she was a first-year at Pond Hill Comprehensive. These usually deal with bullies, problem pupils, teachers, family and friendship problems, brushes with the law, accidents and catastrophes, school trips, Christmas chaos, and even the occasional hint of the supernatural, all told in Pam's own words and her own language.
- Ping Pong Paula — Table tennis player Paula Pride is a real-life ping pong ball between her separated parents. Worse is to follow when rival Myra Glegg starts playing dirty tricks on Paula.
- Prisoner of the Bell — Susie Cathcart can't be bothered with education; her attitude is that life is for fun and she will manage fine without O Levels. The only lesson Susie does care for is gym and she has a natural talent for gymnastics. Then Grandmother Cathcart comes to live with the family, and brings a bell that she uses to summon Susie. The bell soon seems to have a strange power over Susie; every time she hears it, she goes into a trance. Gran begins to use the bell to force her to do her homework, meaning to force Susie into her own mould of being an assiduous, dedicated, brilliant scholar, as well as interfering with Susie's gymnastics, which she considers "useless".
- Prisoners of Paradise Island — Sally Tuff is a tough trainer in order to see her hockey team wins the International Schoolgirl Championship. Then the girls are taken to a luxury island and only Sally realises their hosts are trying to make sure they don't win by over-indulging them.
- Race for a Fortune — When Katie McNab's Uncle Ebenezer dies, his will dictates that whichever relative reaches his home village of Yuckiemuckle first, under their own steam and starting without any money, will inherit his fortune. And so the race to Yuckiemuckle begins, between Katie and her roller skates, and her snobby cousins Caroline and Rodney, who pull every dirty trick they can to sabotage her and get there first.
- Rose among the Thornes — Rose Smith and her grandmother are the only people who know their relatives, the Thornes, are planning to redevelop the village and make a fortune.
- Sally Was a Cat — Sourpuss Sally Biggs wishes she could change places with her cat – and then finds the cat comes from a long line of witches' cats and can therefore oblige her!
- Save Old Smokey! — the battle to save a steam engine.
- She Shall Have Music: Lisa Carstairs is a talented pianist and a selfish, self-obsessed girl who cares nothing for anyone or anything except her piano. Her father works hard at keeping his business together but it comes to an end with a crash, when his business partner flees the country and leaves Mr Carstairs with the associated debts. Everything has to be sold to pay for it, including Lisa's beloved piano — but she refuses to let that stop her from becoming a successful pianist.
- Sisters at War! — sibling rivalry.
- Slave of the Swan — The amnesiac Katrina Vale is taken advantage of by a ballet mistress who wants revenge on Katrina's mother.
- Snobby Shirl the Shoeshine Girl! — Shirley Lomax is a super-snob and her father decides to teach her a lesson by turning her out to shine shoes for a living.
- Somewhere Over The Rainbow — Dorothy and Max are an orphaned brother-sister pair who run away from the state care they are put into when their mother is killed. Inspired by the Wizard of Oz song, they travel from the south of England all the way to Scotland, hoping to find happiness at a care home called Rainbow's End.
- Song of the Fir Tree — Solveig Amundsen and her brother Per are two Norwegian children who are prisoners in a Nazi concentration camp. They and their mother (now dead) have been sent there by Grendelsen, a rich and powerful man whom Mrs Amundsen accidentally found out was a traitor who had betrayed their Resistance group. Solveig is the stronger one, with spirit, strength and determination to survive and make it back home, while Per has a weaker constitution. The end of the war comes and the Allies liberate the camp. But Solveig recognises Grendelsen among the Norwegian officials who have come to collect them. Realising he has come to silence them, Solveig and Per go on the run, with Grendelsen in relentless pursuit. And all the while Solveig sings the song of the fir tree to keep her brother's spirits up.
- Stage Fright — Linda Roberts' father lands a good job as a gamekeeper — but on the bizarre condition that Linda stay at the manor and train as an actress.
- Stefa's Heart of Stone — Stefa Giles and Joy Brett have been the closest of friends since they were toddlers. Then Stefa has her first experience of losing a loved one when Joy succumbs to a terminal illness. Taking a cue from a statue in her garden which seems impervious to everything thrown at it, Stefa resolves to turn her heart into stone so she will never again experience such pain.
- Sue's Daily Dozen — Sue Baker finds a book in the old cottage that she has moved into with her sister, and brings back the recipes of the "Daily Dozen," to the joy of the locals. They were invented by Granny Hayden, the local wise woman, and the recipes in the book turn out to be more like magic spells, but very positive and homely ones intended to spread positive effects in the local community.
- Tale of the Panto Cat — In Daisy Green Youth Club, Verna is known as "the original panto cat". She is conceited, bossy, domineering and self-centered. She walks over everyone to have everything her way.
- Tansy of Jubilee Street — Tansy Taylor keeps a diary of the goings-on in Jubilee Street where she lives, and her school and home. These include sibling rivalry with her brother Simon, which gets even worse when Simon pairs up with his friend Peter Saint.
- Tearaway Trisha — Trisha's careless riding puts a girl in hospital. Now Trisha is putting on three cycle shows to raise money for an operation.
- Tears of a Clown: Kathy Clowne is the victim of relentless bullying. Her worst enemy, Sandra, is making sure Kathy gets no chance to prove her only talent — long distance running.
- The Bow Street Runner — Beth Speede has been the errand girl of Bow Street since she could walk. Then a gypsy's prophecy, which Beth interprets to mean that her father's life depends on her running up to speed, has her take up cross country running. But there is a spiteful rival out to spoil things for her.
- The Changeling — Katy Palmer lives a miserable life with her brutal uncle and his shabby flat. He puts Katy out to work in the stables, little realising that this is the only time she gets some joy. Unfortunately the stables job and riding are cutting into homework time, and Katy is constantly in trouble at school because of it. Then Katy's uncle puts her to work as a dishwasher, which robs Katy of her only joy. At this, Katy runs away and boards a train to Ryechurch. On the train she meets another Katy, Katy Blair, who is on her way to Ryechurch to meet her uncle and aunt, whom her lawyer has only just traced. Then the train crashes, and the accident leaves Katy Blair apparently dead. Desperation drives Katy to steal her suitcase and take her place at Ryechurch so she can finally have a happy life with loving parents. But Katy soon finds she cannot have real happiness because she is living a lie. This story only lasted three issues
- The Christmas Spirit — Julie is fed-up with being the butt of jokes because her surname is Christmas. She tries to find the Christmas spirit for her brother's sake but isn't having much luck – until she finds shelter in a snowstorm and things begin to happen.
- The Disappearing Dolphin — an underwater archaeological dig becomes a dolphin attraction.
- The Ghost Dancer: Ferne Ashley's mother, Martina Kerr, is a famous ballerina and her father a famous composer. When Ferne passes the audition to her mother's old ballet school with Madame Naninska, her short-tempered father starts an argument while driving instead of watching the road, and Ferne's mother gets killed in the ensuing crash. Ferne blames Dad for Mum's death, and decides to punish him by pretending to be crippled so he can't see the joy of her dancing. But being at a ballet school means that there is temptation on all sides to just give in and start dancing. One night, Ferne slips out to some Roman ruins to secretly dance in them, as her mother used to do. Unfortunately one of the pupils spots her, and it adds to a rumour that the ghost of Ferne's mother is haunting the school.
- The Girl the World Forgot — Shona Owens thinks of little but the pleasures in life until she and her dog Scuffer are stranded on a deserted island and find themselves on the steep learning curve on the struggle for survival, while her parents (who also survived the accident) believe that she is dead.
- The Kat and Mouse Game — Everyone avoids Kat Morgan at Barton Grange Ballet School because they all know she is a selfish, bullying girl who grabs all the best chances there are in the school, along with everything else she wants. Meanwhile, new girl Letitia (her last name is not established) arrives. She was not keen on coming because she is a shy girl and happy to be the only ballet pupil in her village because of it. She only agreed to enrol at Barton Grange at the urging of her ballet teacher, who says the school can provide far better tuition for her talent than she can. Shyness also makes Letitia gullible and naïve, so she proves easy prey for Kat's false show of friendship. Kat has quickly realised what a sap Letitia is, and so she is taking advantage of Letitia to turn her into her personal handmaid. She also nicknames Letitia “Mouse”, and it sticks.
- The Perfect Princess — Princess Victoria of Burmania is such a horror that her father disinherits her and has two British girls competing for her crown. Naturally, a heated three-way rivalry ensues.
- The Sweet and Sour Rivals — Suzie Choo's parents run a new Chinese restaurant, the newly opened Choo's Chinese Restaurant. Abigail Beaton's family owns the Riverside Cordon Bleu Restaurant, which is the snobbiest restaurant in town and charges the highest prices. Abigail is just as snooty as the restaurant and recruits help from class bullies Janet and Debbie to find ways to bring Suzie and her restaurant down. Fortunately Suzie has a friend too – Mandy Mead – who thought her school was as dull as dishwater until Suzie joined the class.
- The Venetian Looking Glass — the protagonist finds a hand mirror which starts to control her life and wreak its revenge, ultimately being revealed as due to an angry ghost.
- The Winning Loser — Jean and Alice Fisher try to get a replacement vase for their gran, who is comatose. Alice finds one going as a second prize in a tennis match, but has to learn to play tennis and go up against Selena, an arrogant girl who is always poking fun at her. At the tennis match, Alice starts playing a bit too well against Selena and could end up with first prize instead of the second prize she wanted for her gran. So she has to face a choice at the match – her pride or her gran?
- Toni on Trial — Toni Carr joins her mother's old athletics club, but finds herself an outcast because her mother was disgraced when she was accused of stealing a trophy. Toni is determined to get at the truth.
- Too Old to Cry!- An orphan runs away from a cruel orphanage, but the evil matron is in pursuit.
- Tricia's Tragedy — Tricia Hunt becomes a slave to her cousin Diana Lloyd because she blames herself for an accident that left Diana blind. But Mr Hunt thinks something is fishy, especially when it becomes apparent that the Lloyds are trying to stop Tricia winning a vital swimming trophy.
- Two Mothers for Maggie
- Village of Fame — Sue Parker spins tall tales for a little excitement in her dreary village, despite its name – Fame. Then Major Grenfield rents out the old manor to Mr Grand of IBC TV studios, who wants to film the day-to-day life of the villagers. But Sue is not keen on cameras being installed everywhere in Fame, and her suspicions prove justified when she discovers the lengths that Grand will go to with his publicity stunts to increase ratings. But nobody listens to Sue's warnings about because of her reputation for too much imagination. Luckily, she gains an ally in Grand's niece Mandy.
- Waking Nightmare – Phil Carey befriends and tries to hide a strange girl from the authorities.
- Wanda Whiter than White — Wanda White's over-strictness in telling the truth is making her a tell-tale. However, Wanda is not as innocent as she appears to be — she is on probation for stealing, and is going to such extreme lengths with honesty in an attempt to salve her conscience.
- Waves of Fear — Claire Harvey starts experiencing crippling claustrophobia, and her fear starts ruining her life, as she is frequently bullied and her parents are disgusted at having a "coward" for a daughter.
- White Water — Mr Mason is drowned and his daughter Bridie lamed when their boat "White Water" sinks. Bridie vows there will be a new "White Water."
- Wild Rose — Rose Harding is very happy in the circus she has been brought up in, but when she learns that the family who brought her up aren't her real family, she sets out to find her true parents.

Serials imported from the merger with Lindy:

- Diana's Dolphins — the Dobson family run a dolphinarium, but Dad doesn't want the girls to find this out when he sends Diana to a posh school, in case they look down on her.
- Dragonacre — the environment of Dragonacre is threatened when a Mr Barker wants to buy it for development. To save it, Kerry Ward and her friends have to find £2000. It is then that they discover that the legend of real dragons at Dragonacre was not just a legend.
- Hard Days For Hilda — Skivvy Hilda works at a posh hotel in London, bullied by the sadistic manager.
- Jumping Jenny — Jenny gets off to a bad start at her new school when she is wrongly branded a sneak and sent to Coventry. A teacher discovers her talent for hurdling when she tries to run away, but how can she even get into the team while she is in Coventry?
- Milk-Round Maggie — Maggie Marvin wins the title of Milk-Round Miss and treats her friends at Paradise Place to a day at the seaside, but a yob called Crispin threatens to ruin things with his thoughtless behavior.
- Hettie High and Mighty! - Snobby Hettie King arrives at Dock End School, and quickly proves to be a nasty troublemaker who is extremely cunning at getting her own way. Hettie is also a brilliant hockey player, but hockey captain Janie Downs naturally doesn’t want her on the team - unfortunately, she has no choice but to put up with Hettie, as winning the hockey championship is the only way they can afford to stop Dock End from closing down.

== See also ==
- British girls' comics
