= Carlos Freixas =

Spanish cartoonist and illustrator (1923–2003)

- Born: Carlos Freixas i Baleitó; October 31, 1923 Barcelona, Spain
- Died: February 26, 2003 (aged 79)
- Notable works: "Pistol" Jim

Carlos Freixas i Baleitó, also known as Carles Freixas i Baleitó, (Barcelona, October 31, 1923 - February 26, 2003) was a Spanish cartoonist and illustrator whose most famous creation was "Pistol" Jim.

== Biography ==
=== Beginnings ===
The son of draughtsman Emilio Freixas, from whom he learned the rudiments of the trade, Freixas studied at the School of Art of San Jorge before apprenticing in a scenography workshop.

Along with his father, he worked on the magazine Lecturas and launched an independent publication, ''The Mosquito Collection'', in which Ángel Puigmiquel also participated.

=== Time in Argentina ===
In 1947, Carlos Freixas accepted an offer of Editorial Molino Argentina and was established for almost a decade in Buenos Aires. He collaborated with the Pan American School of Art and published in countless magazines, such as Patoruzito and Aventuras.

=== British comics ===
In the 1970s and 1980s, Freixas illustrated comic strips in British girls' comics like June (Angie’s Angel, My Family, My Foes!, and Wild Girl of the Hills), Jinty (The Valley of the Shining Mist), and Princess vol. 2 (Miranda's Magic Dragon).
