= 1991 Miller Genuine Draft 400 (Michigan) =

14th race of the 1991 NASCAR Winston Cup Series

Race details
- Race 14 of 29 in the 1991 NASCAR Winston Cup Series
- The 1991 Miller Genuine Draft 400 program cover, featuring Rusty Wallace. Artwork by NASCAR artist Sam Bass.
- Date: June 23, 1991
- Official name: 23rd Annual Miller Genuine Draft 400
- Location: Brooklyn, Michigan, Michigan International Speedway
- Course: Permanent racing facility
- Course length: 2 miles (3.2 km)
- Distance: 200 laps, 400 mi (643.737 km)
- Scheduled distance: 200 laps, 400 mi (643.737 km)
- Average speed: 160.912 miles per hour (258.963 km/h)
- Attendance: 90,000

Pole position
Driver	Michael Waltrip	Bahari Racing
- Time: 41.296

Most laps led
Driver	Davey Allison	Robert Yates Racing
- Laps: 107

Winner
No. 28	Davey Allison	Robert Yates Racing

Television in the United States
- Network: CBS
- Announcers: Ken Squier, Ned Jarrett, Chris Economaki

Radio in the United States
- Radio: Motor Racing Network

The 1991 Miller Genuine Draft 400 was the 14th stock car race of the 1991 NASCAR Winston Cup Series season and the 23rd iteration of the event. The race was held on Sunday, June 23, 1991, before an audience of 90,000 in Brooklyn, Michigan, at Michigan International Speedway, a two-mile (3.2 km) moderate-banked D-shaped speedway. The race took the scheduled 200 laps to complete. At race's end, Robert Yates Racing driver Davey Allison would manage to dominate the late stages of the race to take his 11th NASCAR Winston Cup Series victory and his third victory of the season. To fill out the top three, Bobby Allison Motorsports driver Hut Stricklin and Roush Racing driver Mark Martin would finish second and third, respectively.

== Background ==
The layout of Michigan International Speedway, the venue where the race was held.

The race was held at Michigan International Speedway, a two-mile (3.2 km) moderate-banked D-shaped speedway located in Brooklyn, Michigan. The track is used primarily for NASCAR events. It is known as a "sister track" to Texas World Speedway as MIS's oval design was a direct basis of TWS, with moderate modifications to the banking in the corners, and was used as the basis of Auto Club Speedway. The track is owned by International Speedway Corporation. Michigan International Speedway is recognized as one of motorsports' premier facilities because of its wide racing surface and high banking (by open-wheel standards; the 18-degree banking is modest by stock car standards).

=== Entry list ===
- (R) denotes rookie driver.

#	Driver	Team	Make
1	Rick Mast	Precision Products Racing	Oldsmobile
2	Rusty Wallace	Penske Racing South	Pontiac
3	Dale Earnhardt	Richard Childress Racing	Chevrolet
4	Ernie Irvan	Morgan–McClure Motorsports	Chevrolet
5	Ricky Rudd	Hendrick Motorsports	Chevrolet
6	Mark Martin	Roush Racing	Ford
7	Alan Kulwicki	AK Racing	Ford
8	Rick Wilson	Stavola Brothers Racing	Buick
9	Bill Elliott	Melling Racing	Ford
10	Derrike Cope	Whitcomb Racing	Chevrolet
11	Geoff Bodine	Junior Johnson & Associates	Ford
12	Hut Stricklin	Bobby Allison Motorsports	Buick
15	Morgan Shepherd	Bud Moore Engineering	Ford
17	Darrell Waltrip	Darrell Waltrip Motorsports	Chevrolet
19	Chad Little	Little Racing	Ford
20	Buddy Baker	Moroso Racing	Oldsmobile
21	Dale Jarrett	Wood Brothers Racing	Ford
22	Sterling Marlin	Junior Johnson & Associates	Ford
23	Eddie Bierschwale	B&B Racing	Oldsmobile
24	Mickey Gibbs	Team III Racing	Pontiac
25	Ken Schrader	Hendrick Motorsports	Chevrolet
26	Brett Bodine	King Racing	Buick
28	Davey Allison	Robert Yates Racing	Ford
30	Michael Waltrip	Bahari Racing	Pontiac
33	Harry Gant	Leo Jackson Motorsports	Oldsmobile
35	Bill Venturini	Venturini Motorsports	Chevrolet
36	H. B. Bailey	Bailey Racing	Pontiac
41	Larry Pearson	Larry Hedrick Motorsports	Chevrolet
42	Bobby Hillin Jr.	SABCO Racing	Pontiac
43	Richard Petty	Petty Enterprises	Pontiac
49	Stanley Smith (R)	BS&S Motorsports	Buick
52	Jimmy Means	Jimmy Means Racing	Pontiac
55	Ted Musgrave (R)	U.S. Racing	Pontiac
66	Lake Speed	Cale Yarborough Motorsports	Pontiac
68	Bobby Hamilton (R)	TriStar Motorsports	Oldsmobile
70	J. D. McDuffie	McDuffie Racing	Pontiac
71	Dave Marcis	Marcis Auto Racing	Chevrolet
75	Joe Ruttman	RahMoc Enterprises	Oldsmobile
79	Donny Paul	Paul Racing	Oldsmobile
89	Jim Sauter	Mueller Brothers Racing	Pontiac
90	Wally Dallenbach Jr. (R)	Donlavey Racing	Ford
94	Terry Labonte	Hagan Racing	Oldsmobile
98	Jimmy Spencer	Travis Carter Enterprises	Chevrolet

== Qualifying ==
Qualifying was split into two rounds. The first round was held on Friday, June 21, at 3:30 PM EST. Each driver would have one lap to set a time. During the first round, the top 20 drivers in the round would be guaranteed a starting spot in the race. If a driver was not able to guarantee a spot in the first round, they had the option to scrub their time from the first round and try and run a faster lap time in a second round qualifying run, held on Saturday, June 22, at 11:00 AM EST. As with the first round, each driver would have one lap to set a time. For this specific race, positions 21-40 would be decided on time, and depending on who needed it, a select amount of positions were given to cars who had not otherwise qualified but were high enough in owner's points; up to two were given. If needed, a past champion who did not qualify on either time or provisionals could use a champion's provisional, adding one more spot to the field.

Michael Waltrip, driving for Bahari Racing, would win the pole, setting a time of 41.296 and an average speed of 174.351 miles per hour (280.591 km/h) in the first round.

Two drivers would fail to qualify.

=== Full qualifying results ===
Pos.	#	Driver	Team	Make	Time	Speed
1	30	Michael Waltrip	Bahari Racing	Pontiac	41.296	174.351
2	11	Geoff Bodine	Junior Johnson & Associates	Ford	41.466	173.636
3	6	Mark Martin	Roush Racing	Ford	41.479	173.582
4	28	Davey Allison	Robert Yates Racing	Ford	41.555	173.264
5	7	Alan Kulwicki	AK Racing	Ford	41.590	173.119
6	3	Dale Earnhardt	Richard Childress Racing	Chevrolet	41.788	172.298
7	5	Ricky Rudd	Hendrick Motorsports	Chevrolet	41.797	172.261
8	25	Ken Schrader	Hendrick Motorsports	Chevrolet	41.809	172.212
9	12	Hut Stricklin	Bobby Allison Motorsports	Buick	41.828	172.133
10	22	Sterling Marlin	Junior Johnson & Associates	Ford	41.878	171.928
11	10	Derrike Cope	Whitcomb Racing	Chevrolet	41.934	171.698
12	1	Rick Mast	Precision Products Racing	Oldsmobile	41.973	171.539
13	17	Darrell Waltrip	Darrell Waltrip Motorsports	Chevrolet	41.982	171.502
14	21	Dale Jarrett	Wood Brothers Racing	Ford	42.043	171.253
15	15	Morgan Shepherd	Bud Moore Engineering	Ford	42.058	171.192
16	71	Dave Marcis	Marcis Auto Racing	Chevrolet	42.082	171.095
17	42	Bobby Hillin Jr.	SABCO Racing	Pontiac	42.104	171.005
18	26	Brett Bodine	King Racing	Buick	42.117	170.952
19	4	Ernie Irvan	Morgan–McClure Motorsports	Chevrolet	42.134	170.883
20	9	Bill Elliott	Melling Racing	Ford	42.154	170.802
Failed to lock in Round 1
21	66	Lake Speed	Cale Yarborough Motorsports	Pontiac	41.584	173.144
22	33	Harry Gant	Leo Jackson Motorsports	Oldsmobile	41.760	172.414
23	2	Rusty Wallace	Penske Racing South	Pontiac	41.816	172.183
24	98	Jimmy Spencer	Travis Carter Enterprises	Chevrolet	41.860	172.002
25	41	Larry Pearson	Larry Hedrick Motorsports	Chevrolet	41.980	171.510
26	94	Terry Labonte	Hagan Racing	Oldsmobile	42.002	171.420
27	8	Rick Wilson	Stavola Brothers Racing	Buick	42.024	171.331
28	20	Buddy Baker	Moroso Racing	Oldsmobile	42.067	171.156
29	68	Bobby Hamilton (R)	TriStar Motorsports	Oldsmobile	42.103	171.009
30	24	Mickey Gibbs	Team III Racing	Pontiac	42.107	170.993
31	75	Joe Ruttman	RahMoc Enterprises	Oldsmobile	42.131	170.895
32	89	Jim Sauter	Mueller Brothers Racing	Pontiac	42.156	170.794
33	90	Wally Dallenbach Jr. (R)	Donlavey Racing	Ford	42.161	170.774
34	55	Ted Musgrave (R)	U.S. Racing	Pontiac	42.168	170.746
35	35	Bill Venturini	Venturini Motorsports	Chevrolet	42.179	170.701
36	43	Richard Petty	Petty Enterprises	Pontiac	42.260	170.374
37	49	Stanley Smith (R)	BS&S Motorsports	Buick	42.301	170.209
38	19	Chad Little	Little Racing	Ford	42.351	170.008
39	23	Eddie Bierschwale	B&B Racing	Oldsmobile	42.542	169.245
40	36	H. B. Bailey	Bailey Racing	Pontiac	42.770	168.342
Provisional
41	52	Jimmy Means	Jimmy Means Racing	Pontiac	43.094	167.077
Failed to qualify
42	70	J. D. McDuffie	McDuffie Racing	Pontiac	-*	-*
43	79	Donny Paul	Paul Racing	Oldsmobile	-*	-*
Official first round qualifying results
Official starting lineup

== Race results ==
Fin	St	#	Driver	Team	Make	Laps	Led	Status	Pts	Winnings
1	4	28	Davey Allison	Robert Yates Racing	Ford	200	107	running	185	$90,650
2	9	12	Hut Stricklin	Bobby Allison Motorsports	Buick	200	27	running	175	$41,925
3	3	6	Mark Martin	Roush Racing	Ford	200	12	running	170	$37,650
4	6	3	Dale Earnhardt	Richard Childress Racing	Chevrolet	200	14	running	165	$30,950
5	19	4	Ernie Irvan	Morgan–McClure Motorsports	Chevrolet	200	4	running	160	$24,725
6	8	25	Ken Schrader	Hendrick Motorsports	Chevrolet	200	12	running	155	$23,550
7	13	17	Darrell Waltrip	Darrell Waltrip Motorsports	Chevrolet	200	12	running	151	$15,300
8	7	5	Ricky Rudd	Hendrick Motorsports	Chevrolet	200	2	running	147	$18,600
9	15	15	Morgan Shepherd	Bud Moore Engineering	Ford	199	0	running	138	$18,750
10	22	33	Harry Gant	Leo Jackson Motorsports	Oldsmobile	199	1	running	139	$17,450
11	20	9	Bill Elliott	Melling Racing	Ford	199	0	running	130	$17,300
12	14	21	Dale Jarrett	Wood Brothers Racing	Ford	199	0	running	127	$12,825
13	10	22	Sterling Marlin	Junior Johnson & Associates	Ford	199	0	running	124	$10,275
14	30	24	Mickey Gibbs	Team III Racing	Pontiac	198	0	running	121	$9,725
15	17	42	Bobby Hillin Jr.	SABCO Racing	Pontiac	198	0	running	118	$15,175
16	16	71	Dave Marcis	Marcis Auto Racing	Chevrolet	198	0	running	115	$10,750
17	23	2	Rusty Wallace	Penske Racing South	Pontiac	198	0	running	112	$6,925
18	21	66	Lake Speed	Cale Yarborough Motorsports	Pontiac	198	0	running	109	$10,500
19	31	75	Joe Ruttman	RahMoc Enterprises	Oldsmobile	197	0	running	106	$9,585
20	25	41	Larry Pearson	Larry Hedrick Motorsports	Chevrolet	197	0	running	103	$7,270
21	34	55	Ted Musgrave (R)	U.S. Racing	Pontiac	197	0	running	100	$7,800
22	29	68	Bobby Hamilton (R)	TriStar Motorsports	Oldsmobile	197	0	running	97	$7,135
23	37	49	Stanley Smith (R)	BS&S Motorsports	Buick	196	0	running	94	$5,925
24	5	7	Alan Kulwicki	AK Racing	Ford	196	0	running	91	$12,715
25	26	94	Terry Labonte	Hagan Racing	Oldsmobile	196	0	running	88	$8,555
26	38	19	Chad Little	Little Racing	Ford	196	0	running	85	$5,435
27	41	52	Jimmy Means	Jimmy Means Racing	Pontiac	195	0	running	82	$5,385
28	33	90	Wally Dallenbach Jr. (R)	Donlavey Racing	Ford	195	0	running	79	$5,325
29	12	1	Rick Mast	Precision Products Racing	Oldsmobile	194	0	running	76	$7,965
30	28	20	Buddy Baker	Moroso Racing	Oldsmobile	193	0	running	73	$5,150
31	27	8	Rick Wilson	Stavola Brothers Racing	Buick	192	0	running	70	$7,720
32	24	98	Jimmy Spencer	Travis Carter Enterprises	Chevrolet	188	0	engine	67	$7,625
33	40	36	H. B. Bailey	Bailey Racing	Pontiac	187	0	running	64	$4,870
34	1	30	Michael Waltrip	Bahari Racing	Pontiac	185	1	valve	66	$10,450
35	36	43	Richard Petty	Petty Enterprises	Pontiac	166	0	valve	58	$7,360
36	18	26	Brett Bodine	King Racing	Buick	121	0	engine	55	$7,290
37	32	89	Jim Sauter	Mueller Brothers Racing	Pontiac	104	0	piston	52	$4,680
38	39	23	Eddie Bierschwale	B&B Racing	Oldsmobile	86	0	rocker arm	49	$4,635
39	2	11	Geoff Bodine	Junior Johnson & Associates	Ford	70	8	oil pan	51	$17,910
40	35	35	Bill Venturini	Venturini Motorsports	Chevrolet	64	0	camshaft	43	$4,550
41	11	10	Derrike Cope	Whitcomb Racing	Chevrolet	2	0	engine	40	$12,950
Official race results

== Standings after the race ==
Drivers' Championship standings

	Pos	Driver	Points
	1	Dale Earnhardt	2,202
	2	Ricky Rudd	2,064 (-138)
	3	Darrell Waltrip	1,993 (-209)
1	4	Ernie Irvan	1,974 (–228)
1	5	Ken Schrader	1,972 (–230)
	6	Davey Allison	1,954 (–248)
	7	Harry Gant	1,906 (–296)
	8	Mark Martin	1,855 (–347)
1	9	Morgan Shepherd	1,713 (–489)
1	10	Michael Waltrip	1,697 (–505)
Official driver's standings

- Note: Only the first 10 positions are included for the driver standings.

Previous race: 1991 Champion Spark Plug 500	NASCAR Winston Cup Series; 1991 season	Next race: 1991 Pepsi 400
