= End of the Line... =

British comic book story

- Ann Summerton is menaced by Lord Vicary and Brock in a panel from the 14 October 1978 issue of Misty; art by John Richardson.

Publication information
- Publisher: IPC Magazines; Rebellion Developments
- Schedule: Weekly
- Title(s): Misty; 12 August to 18 November 1978
- Formats: Original material for the series has been published as a strip in the comics anthology(s) Misty.
- Publication date: 12 August – 18 November 1978
- Main character(s): Anne Summerton; Lord Vicary; Laila Summerton; Andrew Summerton

Creative team
- Writer(s): Malcolm Shaw
- Artist(s): John Richardson

Reprints
- Collected editions
- Misty Vol. 2: ISBN 9781781086001

"End of the Line..." is a British comic strip published by IPC Magazines in the girls' comic anthology title Misty between 12 August and 18 November 1978. Written by Malcolm Shaw with art by John Richardson, the story revolves around Ann Summerton, who begins seeing visions of her dead father while travelling on the London Underground. Like many of the stories featured in Misty, the serial had strong supernatural elements.

== Creation ==
Writer Malcolm Shaw had worked for IPC since 1969, working with Pat Mills to create Jinty in 1974 before relaunching Mirabelle in 1977. He had taken over as Misty editor in 1978, and wrote several of the title's best-remembered serials including "The Sentinels" and "The Four Faces of Eve". Artist John Richardson rarely drew serials, but had worked extensively in British girls' comics since the 1960s, particularly with a series of covers for IPC's Tammy. While he contributed several self-contained stories to Misty, "End of the Line..." was his only continuing story in the comic. He would later contribute to 2000 AD.

== Publishing history ==
The story was published in fourteen black-and-white four-page episodes from 12 August and 18 November 1978. Misty was among the former IPC titles purchased by Rebellion Developments in 2016, and the company began reprinting selected Misty stories under their Treasury of British Comics imprint soon afterwards. "End of the Line..." was included in the second book in the series, paired with "The Sentinels".

== Plot summary ==
After teenager Ann Somerton's father Andrew is killed during construction of the new Windsor Line for the London Underground, her mother Lilian receives a substantial amount of compensation. Ann, her mother and her mother's new boyfriend - Neville Chandler, who Ann believes is only interested in getting the large insurance pay-out - are invited to join the Mayor's party on the line's maiden train. Passing through a tunnel, Ann sees a vision of her father as one of a gang of ragged workers and faints. This draws the attention of a journalist from the Daily Globe, who begins to investigate. No-one believes her story, but Ann begins dreaming of her father, begging her to help. She returns to the line alone and has another vision, this time seeing her father being beaten by sinister figures. Desperate to find more, she visits her father's old friend Mr. Carstairs, an expert on the Underground, and learns of the old Prince Albert line in the same place decades before, which was covered up after a tunnel collapsed.

Meanwhile, the journalist and his photographer venture into the tunnels, only to vanish. Ann spots a photograph of Victorian industrialist Lord Vicary in a magazine, and recognises him as the ringleader in her visions, and - despite her mother's increasingly histrionic attempts to get her to stop her daughter's obsession - returns to the Windsor Line after speaking to Globe editor Franklin, who instigates a police search of the tunnel. However, while Ann sees the two newsmen now among the workers, the police don't. After a spell committed to Stapleton Clinic, Ann pretends there was nothing behind her visions, and requests a visit to Vicary Hall, now a stately home that allows guided tours. She discovers Vicary conducted secretive botanical experiments and had a dim view of the growing worker's rights movement before disappearing in the Prince Albert Line disaster.

Ann is later able to return to the Windsor Line in secret, but is accosted by the demonic Vicary before escaping with the help of an Underground worker. She follows them back to the ruins of the Albert Line. Using his botany research, Vicary and his right-hand thug Brock have prolonged their own lives and kidnapped her father and his workmates as well as others to build them an underground town. Ann is captured too, and finds Vicary is using drugs to keep control. With the aid of Vicary's abused maid Lucy, Ann is able to get to her father. The police meanwhile are drilling in the Underground as they search for Ann, having found a picture taken by the photographer that corroborates her story. Falling masonry kills Vicary as he prepares to attack Ann.

The captives are freed, while those exposed to Vicary's drug are found an island where they can live, with the government covering the incident up so they can live in peace. Andrew returns to his family, sending Neville packing, and Ann has her father back.

== Collected editions ==
Title	ISBN	Publisher	Release date	Contents
Misty Vol. 2	9781781086001	Rebellion Developments	15 November 2017	Material from Misty 4 February to 22 April & 12 August to 18 November 1978

== Reception ==
The inclusion of "End of the Line..." in the second of Rebellion's Misty collections attracted largely positive reviews. A Resource on Jinty considered the story "one of Misty's more underrated serials". Win Wiacek was also effusive reviewing the story, considering it "[e]vocative and dripping tension" Julia Round has suggested the story was influenced by the 1972 British horror film Death Line, and that the oppressed servants of Vicary were influenced by Shaw's left-leaning political views.

Broken Frontier's Andy Oliver however felt it was one of the weaker stories from the first three Misty compilations; while praising Richardson's artwork, he described the story as "a little muddled in focus and perhaps a touch overlong as well". Ian Keogh was also reserved while reviewing the collection for Slings & Arrows, feeling the story was predictable and fanciful, but feeling Shaw's "unconventional writing" kept it interesting.
