= Trini Tinturé =

Spanish cartoonist and illustrator (1935–2024)

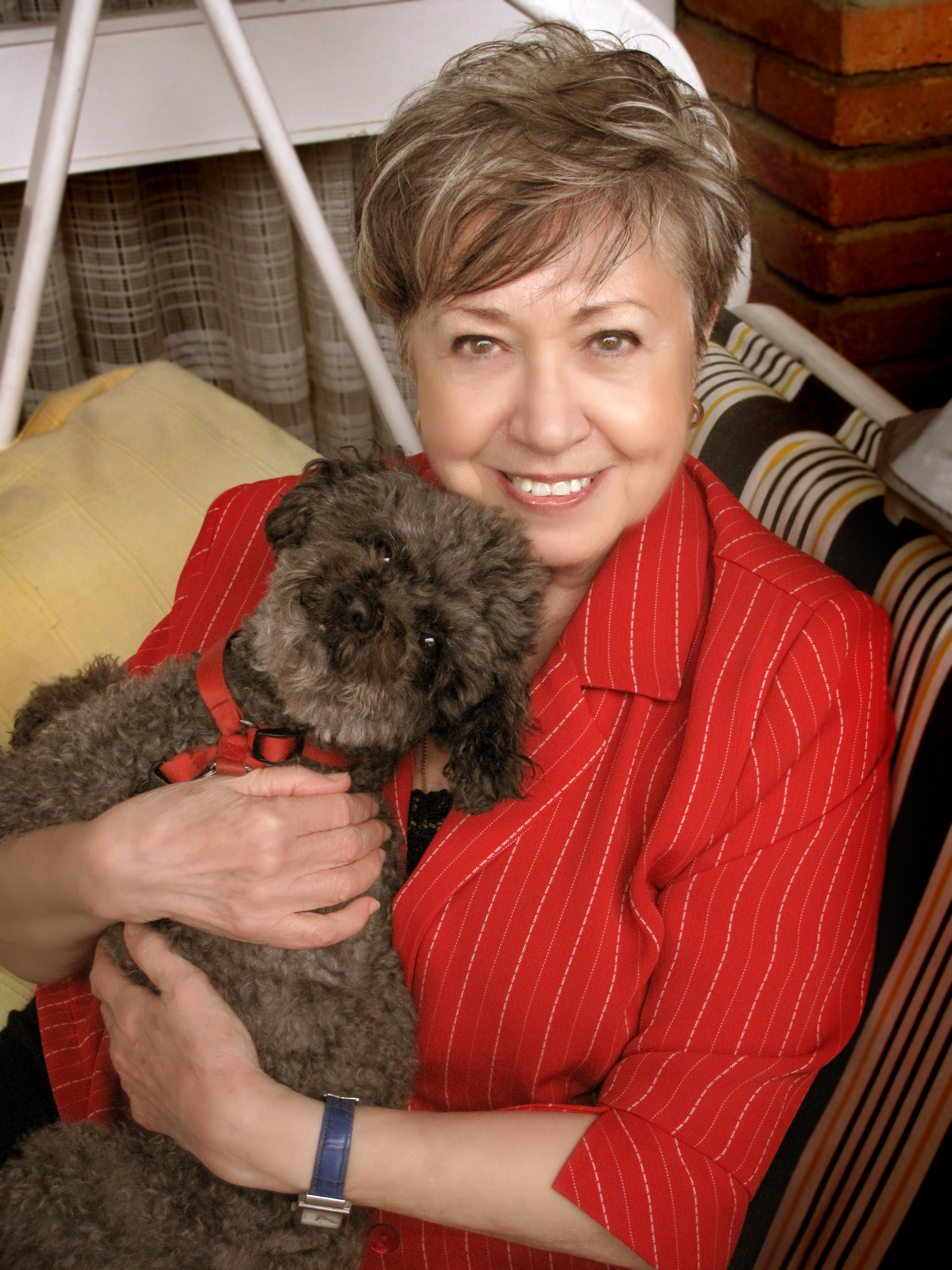
- Tinturé in 2010
- Born: Trinidad Tinturé Navarro; 6 August 1935 Lleida, Spain
- Died: 17 January 2024 (aged 88) Barcelona, Spain
- Notable works: Emma es encantadora
- Collaborators: Andreu Martín; Francisco Pérez Navarro
- Awards: Grand Prize, Cómic Barcelona (2023)

Trini Tinturé (née Trinidad Tinturé Navarro; 6 August 1935 – 17 January 2024) was a Spanish cartoonist and illustrator. Her work has a prominent place in the history of 20th-century comics. She worked mainly for the foreign market. She specialized in comics aimed at girls and teenagers, among which Emma es encantadora (Emma is charming) (1981), her most representative work in Spain, created in collaboration with the scriptwriter Andreu Martín, stands out. She was honored with the Grand Prize at the 2023 Barcelona International Comic Fair.

== Early life and education ==
Trini Tinturé was born in Lleida, 6 August 1935, at the start of the Spanish Civil War. Her family of six lived on the income of her father, who had a carpentry workshop.

From a very early age, she showed a fondness for drawing. Though her training was limited to being self-taught, in 1955, Tinturé was awarded the first medal for artistic drawing by the Círculo de Bellas Artes in her hometown.

== Career ==
In 1957, she went by train to Barcelona, where a great-aunt of hers lived. There, Tinturé had no problems finding work as a cartoonist in small publishing houses (Gráficas Soriano; Indedi), contributing to publications for children and adolescents. She also tried working in advertising agencies. In 1960, she joined the publishing house Editorial Bruguera where she drew for the magazines Celia and Sissi. From there, she made the leap to the foreign market through the agency Creaciones Editoriales. Her comics, such as Biggi, Jurtz, Jamp Shop, Tina, and Twinkle, were published in magazines in Germany, Austria, and the United Kingdom. Her comics series for foreign markets include Jinty, Oh, Tinker!, and Curly.

From 1981, with scriptwriters Andreu Martín and Francisco Pérez Navarro, Tinturé developed her most popular series, Emma es encantadora, for the magazine Lily. In 2015, the 33rd Barcelona International Comic Fair dedicated an exhibition under the title "Autoras del cómic femenino en el franquismo 1940/1970" in which Tinturé's works were included. In 2023, the 41st Barcelona International Comic Fair awarded the Grand Prize to Tinturé.

== Death ==
Trini Tinturé died on 17 January 2024, at the age of 88.

== Style ==
Armando Matías Guiu has described the tenderness of Tinturé's drawings.

== Awards and distinctions ==
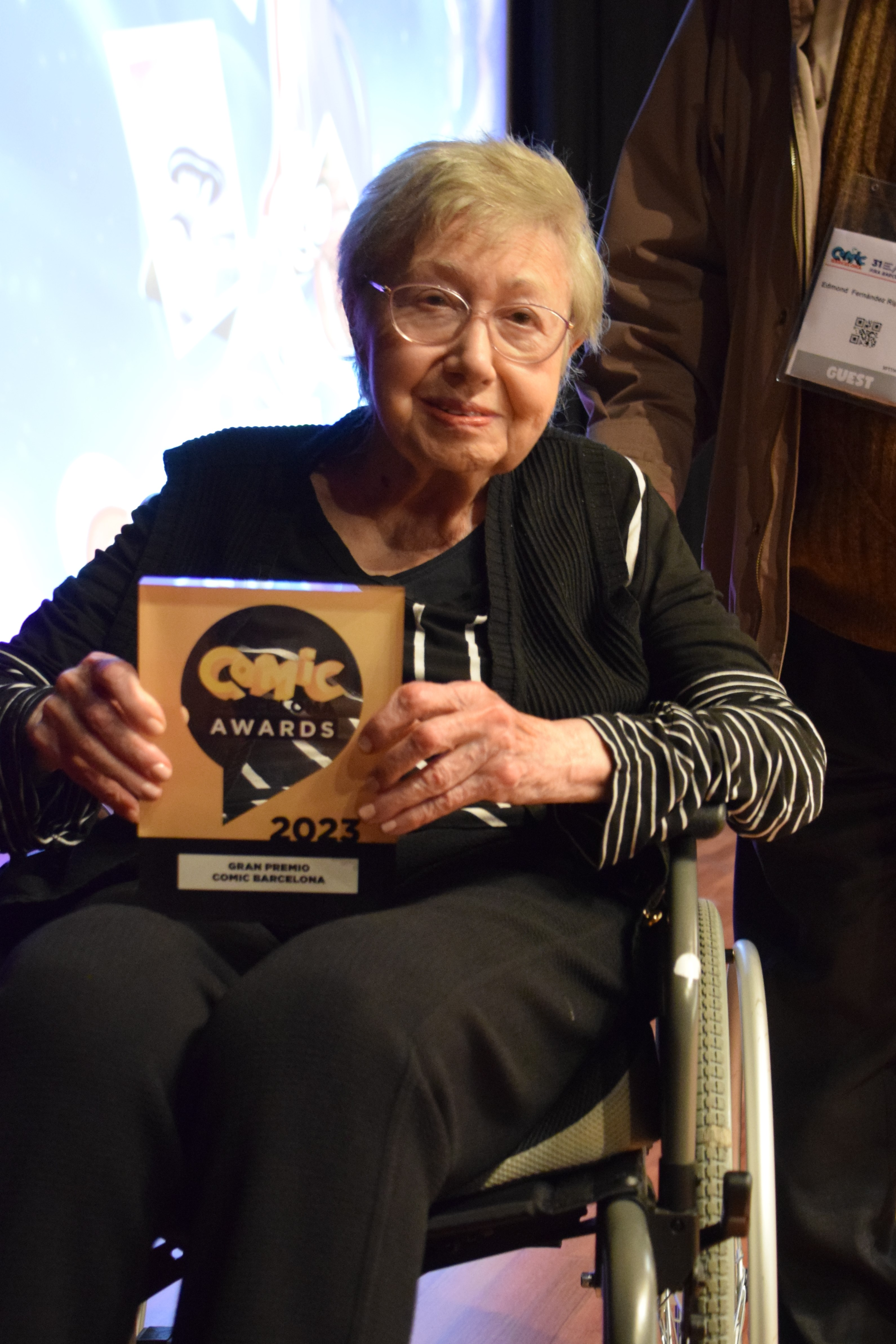
Tinturé at Cómic Barcelona, 2023

- 2023, Grand Prize, Cómic Barcelona
- 2015, Haxtur Award, for the "author we love", for her entire career
- 1955, First Medal, Círculo de Bellas Artes, for artistic drawing

== Selected works ==
- 1985, Violeta, series, Lily Extra, Bruguera
- 19??, Un sombrero para un hada, strip Lamp Shot
- 196?, June, series, Oh, Tinker!
- 196?, No molesten por favor strip, Selección Romántica, Marco
- 1981, Emma es encantadora (scriptwriters, Andreu Martín & Pérez Navarro), series, Lily, Bruguera
- 1983, Emma (scriptwriters, Andreu Martín & Pérez Navarro), series, Joyas Literarias Juveniles/Azul, Bruguera
- 1965, El verdadero amor (scriptwriter, Ralph Reagan), strip, Fans, no. 15
- 1963, Curly, series, Twinkle
- 1961, De riguroso incógnito, (scriptwriter, Victoria Sau), strip, 17 años, Marco
- 1959, El perfume de la felicidad (scriptwriter, Trini Tinturé), strip, Piluchi, Hispano Americana
