= Phil Gascoine =

British comics artist

- Phil Gascoine at the London Comics Festival, 2004
- Born: 8 June 1934
- Died: August 2007 (aged 73)
- Area: Artist

Phil Gascoine (8 June 1934 – August 2007) was a British comics artist, best known for his work in comics such as Jinty, Bunty, and Battle Action, for which he drew The Sarge.

== Biography ==
On leaving school at the age of 15, Phil Gascoine worked in various London art studios until leaving to do his National Service. On his return, his first comic book work was on a series of pocket-sized comics based on TV medical drama Emergency Ward Ten.

His comics career covered 45 years of work on varied titles as a freelancer, in the British, American, and European comics markets.

He died in August 2007 after a short illness.

== Partial bibliography ==
For a more complete list of credits, see Downthetubes.net.

=== IPC ===
- Battle Action
  - The Sarge
  - Sailor Sam
  - The Wilde Bunch
  - The News Team
- Jinty
  - No Cheers for Cherry
  - Badgered Belinda

=== DC Thomson ===
- Commando

=== Other ===
- Look-in
  - Knight Rider
  - Robin of Sherwood
- Wendy

=== Marvel ===
- Punisher
- Knights of Pendragon
- Genetix

=== DC Comics ===
- The Unknown Soldier (1988–1989)
- Shade, the Changing Man
