= Straight (racing) =

Part of a race track which is straight

In many forms of racing, a straight or stretch is a part of the race track in which the competitors travel in a straight line for any significant time, as opposed to a bend or curve. The term is used in horse racing, motor racing and track and field athletics.

In athletics, a typical 400 m track features two straights and two bends. The final straight before the finish line is known as the home straight, or the pit straight in Formula One, while the other is known as the back straight.

In motor racing, both the pit lane and finish line are often located on the longest straight on the circuit. Notable exceptions are the 6 km Mulsanne Straight at Le Mans, which is at the opposite side of the circuit; and at the Silverstone Circuit, which has the pit lane on the Hamilton Straight, rather than the Hangar Straight.

In the United States the home straight in athletics, and also the straight part of a motor racing track, is sometimes referred to as a straightaway. The final straight is sometimes known as the home stretch.
