= Finish line =

Finish line may refer to:

== Sports ==
- The line denoting the physical ending point for a racing sport

== Film and television ==
- Finish Line (1989 film), a television film starring Josh Brolin
- Finish Line, a 2008 television film starring Scott Baio and Taylor Cole
- The Finish Line (game show), a British quiz show
- "Finish Line" (The Price Is Right), a segment game from The Price Is Right
- "Finish Line" (The Flash), an episode of The Flash

== Songs ==
- "Finish Line" (Yasmin song), 2011
- "Finish Line", by Lou Reed from Set the Twilight Reeling, 1996
- "Finish Line", by Elton John and Stevie Wonder from The Lockdown Sessions, 2021
- "Finish Line", by Rita Ora, 2022
- "Finish Line", by Skillet from Victorious, 2019
- "Finish Line", by Trippie Redd from Trip at Knight, 2021
- "Finish Line", by White Lies from Five, 2019
- "Finish Line/Drown", by Chance the Rapper from Coloring Book, 2016
- "The Finish Line", by Axium from The Story Thus Far, 2004
- "The Finish Line", by Michael Angelo Batio from No Boundaries, 1994
- "The Finish Line", by Snow Patrol from Eyes Open, 2006
- "The Finish Line", by Train from Save Me, San Francisco, 2009

== Other uses ==
- "Finish Line" (comics), a 2020 DC Comics The Flash storyline
- Finish Line, Inc., an American athletic retailer

== See also ==
- End of the Line (disambiguation)
- Finishing Line, a Singaporean Chinese television series
- The Finishing Line (1977), a short film produced by British Transport Films
- The Finnish Line (2024), an American television film produced by Hallmark Media
