= Malcolm Shaw (comics) =

British comics writer and editor

- Born: 5 December 1946 Scotland
- Died: 4 December 1984 (aged 37)
- Area: Writer
- Notable works: British girls' comics
- Spouse: Brenda Ellis

Malcolm Campbell Shaw (5 December 1946 – 4 December 1984) was a British comics writer and editor, involved in many girls' comics such as Jinty, New Mirabelle, and Misty.

== Biography ==
Shaw grew up in Paisley in Scotland, an only child, and studied at Glasgow University before moving into journalism. His comics career began when he took a job at DC Thomson in Dundee. In 1968 he left the company and moved to London, beginning a job as sub-editor at Fleetway (IPC) in 1969. In 1970 he met his wife Brenda Ellis.

Shaw met comics writer and editor Pat Mills at IPC and the duo worked together to launch Jinty in 1974. Shaw also edited and contributed a great deal to New Mirabelle, which was launched in February 1977. He then took over the editorship of Misty shortly after its launch in 1978, and remained in this position for the bulk of the comic's run.

In 1977 Shaw wrote six of the earliest Judge Dredd stories for 2000 AD. He also wrote the 34-episode series Return to Armageddon for that comic (1980–1981).

Shaw gave up editorship of Misty and his staff job at Fleetway in 1979 to go freelance and travel with his young family. They moved to Castelldefels near Barcelona in Catalonia, Spain, alongside many of the Spanish artists who had worked on the same comics.

In 1981, the family moved back to London, and Shaw began developing children's magazine BEEB.

Shaw had suffered from ulcerative colitis since the age of twelve and died of cancer on 4 December 1984, a day before his thirty-eighth birthday.

== Bibliography ==
Shaw wrote a number of serials for British girls' comics, including The Robot Who Cried (Jinty), The Sentinels (Misty), The Four Faces of Eve (Misty), and End of the Line (Misty). Based on his left-wing politics and interests in science fiction, literature and mythology, he is the likely author of many other girls’ comics stories that combine similar themes.
