= Insufferable =

American comic book series

- Promotional art by Peter Krause.

Publication information
- Publisher: Thrillbent
- Schedule: Weekly
- Format: Ongoing series
- Genre: Superhero
- Publication date: May 2012
- No. of issues: 68

Creative team
- Written by: Mark Waid
- Artist: Peter Krause
- Letterer: Troy Peteri
- Colorist: Nolan Woodard

Insufferable is an American comic book series written by Mark Waid and digitally published by Waid's Thrillbent label. The series, described by Waid as a "dramedy", follows Joshua Cross, of Van Meter Iowa, the dedicated hero Nocturnus, and his arrogant, egotistical former sidekick Galahad, who are forced to reunite to tackle a new case. Insufferable reunited Waid with his Irredeemable creative team, artist Peter Krause and colorist Nolan Woodard. The series began publication on May 1, 2012, as Thrillbent's launch title.

== Publication history ==
Insufferable was first announced at the Chicago Comic & Entertainment Expo in April 2012 as the first series to be released on Waid's new online digital comic publishing platform Thrillbent.

The first issue of Insufferable was released on May 1 on Thrillbent. The comic reunites Waid with his creative team from the finished comic series Irredeemable; artist Peter Krause, colorist Nolan Woodard, and letterer Troy Peteri. Waid designed the comic specifically for digital release as opposed to comics which are designed for print and also released digitally. Remarking on the flexibility of digital comics allowing long, short, and one-off series, Waid stated: "I can see [Insufferable] ending at some point, but I also see how we can do sequels".

Unlike traditional print comics, Insufferable is intended to be released in a 4 x 3 landscape format to allow pages to fit comfortably on standard horizontal monitors and similar viewing devices. Speaking about the format decision, Waid said: "I hate, with a white hot passion, digital comics where I only get to see a little bit of the screen as I go and I have to scroll around to get the sense of what the whole page [is]". Waid claimed that releasing the comic digitally was the only option available, as he was not able to afford the cost of releasing it in print, and was selling off his collection of print comics to raise funds for the venture. Additionally he financially partnered with comic writer and television producer John Rogers, and provides his collaborators, like Krause, with co-ownership, trading initially lower rates of payment for potential larger future gains if the series is a success. Waid claimed that if the series was successful and profitable, future releases in print would be possible. In October 2013, issues 1-8 were collected in print.

Volume 2 finished on November 30, 2013, and the first issue of volume 3 was released on November 12, 2014 after a one-year absence. Releases have not followed the weekly schedule as was planned, with the 16th issue being released on April 22, 2015.

== Development ==
In April, Waid described the setting as what happens when a hero has a kid sidekick who grows up to be a "completely ungrateful, self-aggrandizing", "douchebag", who "will not shut up about how much of a genius he is and how the world is a better place now that [the hero team] are broken up because now he can do it all the way he wanted to do it". The series follows the events that force the hero and the former sidekick to reunite in spite of their mutual hatred for one another.
