= Plutonian =

Plutonian may refer to:

- Plutonian, of or relating to the astronomical object Pluto
- The Plutonian, a character in Irredeemable
- A mineral from Pluto (as well as a species) on the TV series "Rick and Morty"

== See also ==
- Plutoid, any trans-Neptunian dwarf planet, for which the name 'plutonian' had originally been proposed
