= Marcio Takara =

Comic book artist

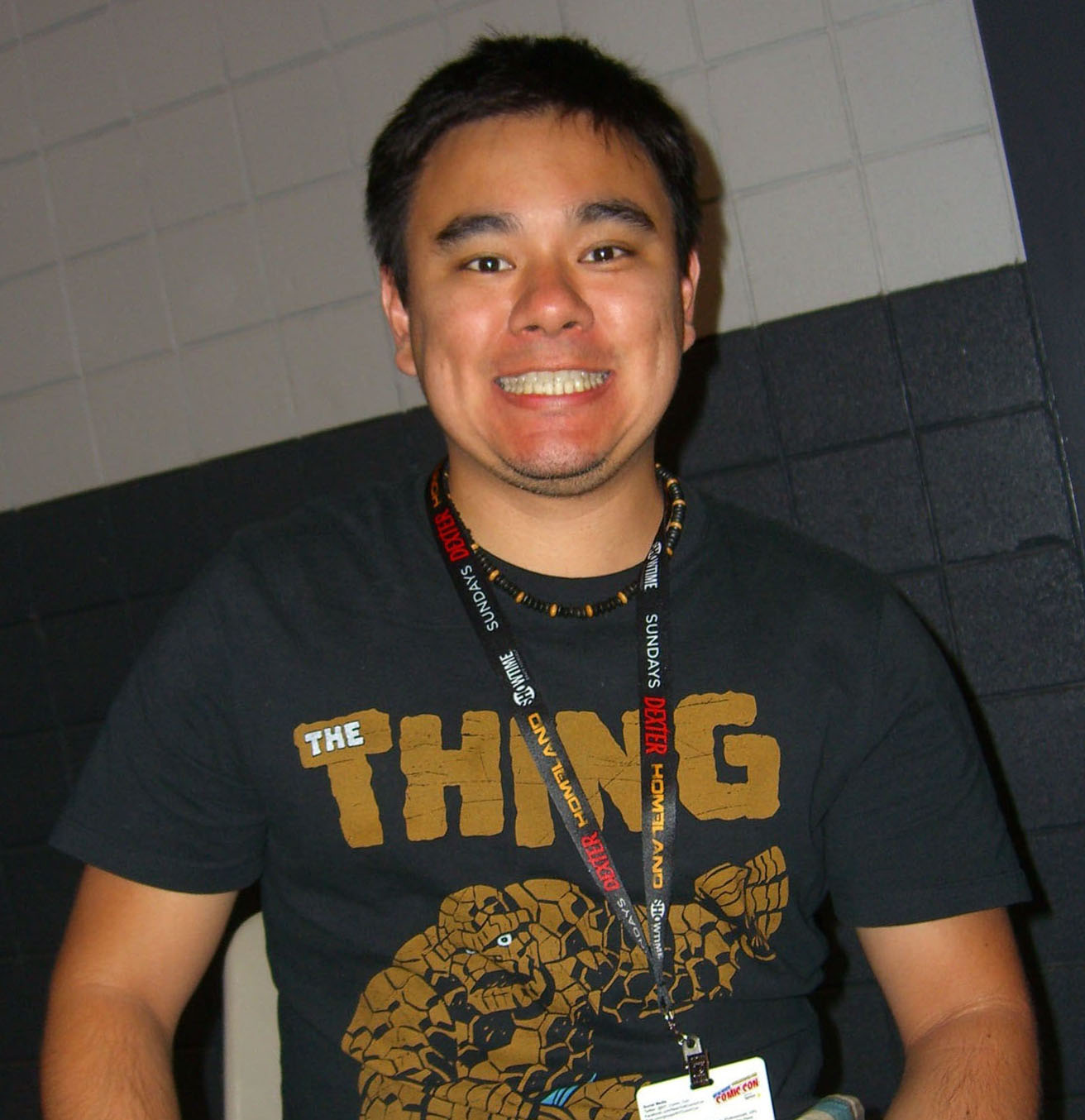
- Takara at the 2011 New York Comic Con
- Areas: Penciller, Inker
- Notable works: The Incredibles: Family Matters, Incorruptible

Marcio Takara is a comic book artist known for his work on books such as Incorruptible, The Incredibles: Family Matters and Dynamo 5.

== Career ==
Marcio Takara has been working with comics since 2006.

Takara has named Stuart Immonen and Jim Lee among his artistic influences.

From 2010 to 2011, Takara worked on Incorruptible for Boom! Studios, providing art for 16 issues in total beginning with Irredeemable No. 11. As of 2014, he is currently working on Captain Marvel for Marvel Comics.

Takara has been working as a comic artist professionally since 2006 for several publishers like Boom! Studios, Image Comics, Marvel and DC Comics.

== Reception ==
Rich Johnston from bleedingcool.com praised Marcio's artwork in Family Matters comparing it to Kyle Baker and stating it has "wonderfully composed pages that make real emotional points, emphasis funny gags, and give a real sense of reality to these 2D versions of 3D CGI characters."

== Technique and materials ==
Takara begins his pages with 7 in × 5 in (180 mm × 130 mm) ink thumbnail sketches with which he shows his overall ideas to his editor. When he begins the actual pencils, he keeps them "loose", because he will eventually ink over them himself, and does not require greater specificity. The penciling stage is the fastest stage for Takara, who does all of his pencil work with an HB 0.5 mechanical pencil, completing two or three penciled pages a day, sometimes even inking all three by the end of the day, which he does with Micron pens ranging in size from .005 to 1.0, Pentel brush pens and cheap brushes for filling in large black areas.

== Personal life ==
In 2011, Takara moved from Toronto to Rio de Janeiro. Previously, he lived for eight years in Toronto, Canada.

According to his social media postings as of 2025, Takara stated his most recent projects include: "Detective Comics, "Nightwing", "Green Arrow", "Hellblazer" and Hawkman for DC Comics. "Captain Marvel", All-New Wolverine", "Daredevil", "Jessica Jones" and "Wolverine" for Marvel Comics. He also stated that he is a huge fan of Diet Coke.

== Selected bibliography ==
- The Incredibles: Family Matters (with writer Mark Waid, March to June 2009)
