= Incorruptible =

Incorruptible may refer to:

- French frigate Incorruptible, launched in 1795
- Incorruptible (album), studio album by the American heavy metal band Iced Earth
- Incorruptible (comics), American comic book series
- Incorruptibility

== See also ==
- Corruption
- Data corruption
