= Jim Zub =

Canadian comic book writer, artist, and art instructor

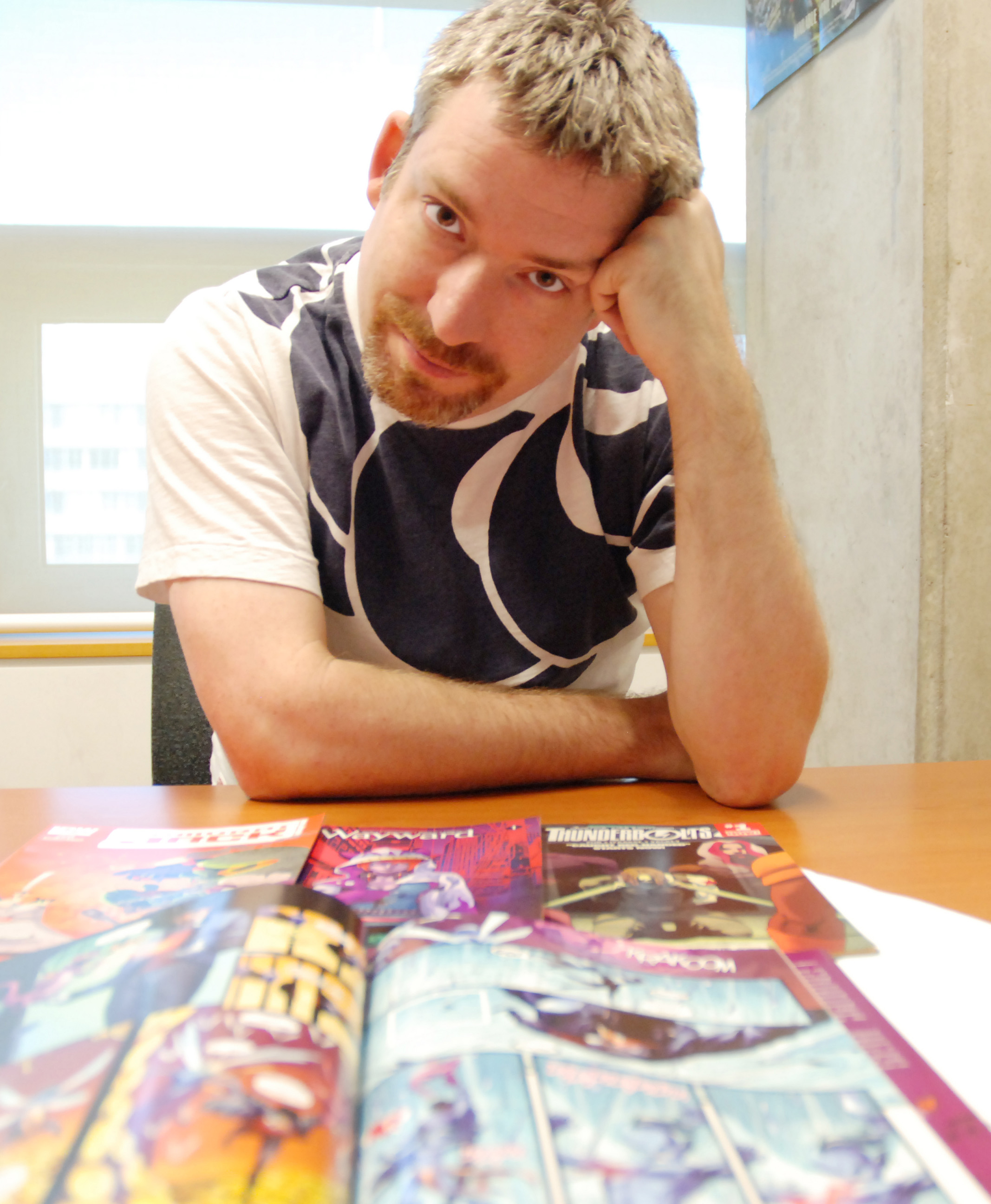
- Born: Jim Zubkavich; May 18, 1976 (age 50)
- Occupation: Comic book writer
- Writing career
- Language: English
- Years active: 2001–present
- Genres: Fantasy, action, superhero
- Notable awards: Full list
- Website: jimzub.com

Jim Zubkavich, known professionally as Jim Zub, is a Canadian comic book writer, artist, and art instructor best known for creating comics Skullkickers (2010), Wayward (2014), and Glitterbomb (2016) for Image Comics, writing on the series Thunderbolts (2016), Uncanny Avengers (2017), and spearheading the reboot of Conan the Barbarian (2023) for Titan Comics. As well as writing and creating comics, Zub is the former program co-ordinator and art professor at Toronto's Seneca College.

== Early life ==
Jim Zub is Canadian. He grew up watching Spider-Man cartoons as a kid, and soon after fell in love with comics. He has stated that Stan Lee was a big influence on him, specifically by giving his superheroes flaws.

== Career ==
Jim Zub created his first comic, Makeshift Miracle, in 2001, followed by a nine-year stint at UDON Entertainment as a colorist, illustrator, project manager, writer and editor where he wrote various Street Fighter comic books.

In 2010, Zub launched Skullkickers at Image Comics. A creator-owned sword & sorcery action-comedy, Skullkickers ran for thirty-three issues completing six volumes. The series came to an end in 2015.

In 2013, Zub wrote Samurai Jack comics for IDW and Cartoon Network. Initially intended as one five-issue arc, the comic ran twenty issues, ending in 2015.

In 2014, Zub launched Wayward at Image Comics with art by co-creator Steven Cummings. His first creator-owned book since Skullkickers, Wayward is described as Buffy The Vampire Slayer set in Japan." A teen coming-of-age story injected with Japanese myth and the supernatural. The series spanned 30 issues and six trade paperback volumes before coming to an end on October 31, 2018.

Zub and IDW partnered up for Dungeons & Dragons: Legends of Baldur's Gate #1-5 in 2014, followed up by Dungeons & Dragons: Shadows of the Vampire #1-5 in 2016, Dungeons & Dragons: Frost Giant’s Fury #1-5 in 2017, and Dungeons & Dragons: Evil At Baldur’s Gate #1-5 in 2018.

In 2016, Zub and French-Canadian artist Djibril Morissette-Phan launched Glitterbomb at Image Comics, a four-part mini-series about a struggling actress trying to regain fame in a sexist, abusive industry. A second four-part mini-series, Glitterbomb: The Fame Game, launched in 2017.

Zub started writing for Marvel in 2016 with Thunderbolts, followed by Uncanny Avengers in 2017. He created a new hero, villains, and new backstories in the 16-part Avengers: No Surrender in 2018, as well as taking over Champions with #19, and creating a new Canadian Hero, Snowguard. Also in 2018, Zub wrote the four-part Wolverine miniseries, Mystery in Madripoor.

In August of 2018, Zub teamed up with writer Patrick Rothfuss and artist Troy Little to write a Dungeons & Dragons/Rick & Morty crossover mini-series, titled Rick and Morty vs. Dungeons & Dragons #1-4. Zub co-wrote, with Sarah Stern and with art by Little, Rick and Morty vs. Dungeons & Dragons: Chapter II: Painscape; the follow-up series was published from September to December 2019. The Rick and Morty vs Dungeons and Dragons Deluxe Edition, by Rothfuss, Zub, and Little, was nominated for the 2022 "Best Graphic Album—Reprint" Eisner Award.

In late 2018, it was announced that Zub, along with writers Mark Waid and Al Ewing, would reunite for Avengers: No Road Home, being called a "spiritual successor" to their previous collaboration, Avengers: No Surrender." Art will be done by Paco Medina and Sean Izaakse. The series began in February 2019.

From December 2022 to March 2023, Zub returned to Oni Press to write the Cthulhu Mythos crossover mini-series Rick and Morty vs. Cthulhu #1-4.

Since August 2023, Zub has been the flagship comic writer for Conan the Barbarian, owned by Heroic Signatures and published in English by Titan Comics.

== Personal life ==
Zub and his wife, Stacy King, live in Toronto. In addition to writing comics, from 2004 to 2024 Zub was a professor at Toronto's Seneca College teaching classes in Layout and Design, Character Animation, and Animation History.

== Awards and nominations ==
Year	Award	Category	Nominated work	Result
2002	Web Cartoonists’ Choice Awards	Best Newcomer	NA	Won
2011	YALSA	Great Graphic Novels	Skullkickers Vol. 1	Won
2011	Joe Shuster Canadian Comic Award	Outstanding Writer	NA	Nominated
2012	Joe Shuster Canadian Comic Award	Outstanding Writer	NA	Nominated
2013	Joe Shuster Canadian Comic Award	Outstanding Writer	NA	Nominated
2013	Animex	Animex Honorary Award	NA	Won
2013	Harvey Awards	Special Award for Humor	Skullkickers	Nominated
2014	Harvey Awards	Special Award for Humor	Skullkickers	Nominated
2016	YALSA	Great Graphic Novels for Teens	Wayward Vol. 1	Won
2018	Joe Shuster Canadian Comic Award	Outstanding Writer	NA	Won
2022	Eisner Awards	Best Graphic Album—Reprint	Rick and Morty vs Dungeons & Dragons Deluxe Edition	Nominated

== Bibliography ==
=== BOOM! Studios ===
- Adventure Time Comics #4
- Munchkin #1-4

=== DC Comics ===
- Batman: Urban Legends #20
- Legends of the Dark Knight 100 Page Super Spectacular #1
- Let Them Live!: Unpublished Tales from the DC Vault #1
- Suicide Squad: Amanda Waller #1
- SFX-Pop! (anthology)

=== Dark Horse Comics ===
- Conan / Red Sonja #1-4

=== Dynamite Comics ===
- Li'l Sonja #1
- Pathfinder #1-12
- Pathfinder: City of Secrets #1-6
- Red Sonja and Cub #1
- Unbreakable Red Sonja #1-5

=== IDW ===
- Samurai Jack #1-20 collected as:
  - Volume 1 (collects #1-4, TPB, 120 pages, 2014, ISBN 978-1613778944)
  - Volume 2 (collects #5-10, TPB, 120 pages, 2014, ISBN 978-1631401312)
  - Volume 3 (collects #11-15, TPB, 120 pages, 2015, ISBN 978-1631402456)
  - Volume 4 (collects #16-20, TPB, 120 pages, 2015, ISBN 978-1631403804)
- Dungeons & Dragons limited series:
  - Dungeons & Dragons: Legends of Baldur's Gate #1-5 collected in Volume 1 (collects #1-5, TPB, 124 pages, 2015, ISBN 978-1631402500)
  - Dungeons & Dragons: Shadows of the Vampire #1-5 collected in Volume 1 (collects #1-5, TPB, 120 pages, 2016, ISBN 978-1631407666)
  - Dungeons & Dragons: Frost Giant's Fury #1-5 collected in Volume 1 (collects #1-5, TPB, 128 pages, 2017, ISBN 978-1631409288)
  - Dungeons & Dragons: Evil At Baldur's Gate #1-5 collected in Volume 1 (collects #1-5, TPB, 120 pages, 2018, ISBN 978-1684053353)
  - Dungeons & Dragons: Mindbreaker #1-5 collected in Volume 1 (collects #1-5, TPB, 2022, ISBN 978-1-68405-888-4)
  - Dungeons & Dragons: Fortune Finder #1-5
  - Dungeons & Dragons: Infernal Tides #1-5
- Stranger Things and Dungeons & Dragons #1-4 (co-written with Jody Houser) collected as
  - Volume 1 (collects #1-4, TPB, 96 pages, 2021, ISBN 978-1506721071)
- Other collected editions:
  - Dungeons & Dragons: Days of Endless Adventure (March 2020, ISBN 978-1-68405-275-2) which collects Legends of Baldur's Gate, Shadows of the Vampire and Frost Giant's Fury
  - Dungeons & Dragons: Best of Minsc & Boo (April 2022) which collects Legends of Baldur's Gate #1, Shadows of the Vampire #2, Evil at Baldur's Gate #1, and Evil at Baldur's Gate #5

=== Image Comics ===
- Skullkickers #1-34 collected as:
  - Volume 1 (collects #1-5, TPB, 144 pages, 2011, ISBN 1607063662)
  - Volume 2 (collects #6-11, TPB, 144 pages, 2011, ISBN 1607064421)
  - Volume 3 (collects #12-17, TPB, 144 pages, 2012, ISBN 1607066122)
  - Volume 4 (collects #18-23, TPB, 160 pages, 2013, ISBN 1607067668)
  - Volume 5 (collects #24-29, TPB, 144 pages, 2014, ISBN 1632150336)
  - Volume 6 (collects #30-33 & #100, TPB, 144 pages, 2015, ISBN 1632153432)
  - Skullkickers Super Special (2022)
- Wayward #1-30 collected as:
  - Volume 1 (collects #1-5, TPB, 144 pages, 2015, ISBN 978-1632151735)
  - Volume 2 (collects #6-10, TPB, 136 pages, 2015, ISBN 978-1632154033)
  - Volume 3 (collects #11-15, TPB, 128 pages, 2016, ISBN 978-1632157010)
  - Volume 4 (collects #16-20, TPB, 136 pages, 2017, ISBN 978-1534300538)
  - Volume 5 (collects #21-25, TPB, 136 pages, 2018, ISBN 978-1534303508)
  - Volume 6 (collects #26-30, TPB, 152 pages, 2018, ISBN 978-1534308749)
- Glitterbomb #1-4 collected as:
  - Volume 1 (collects #1-4, TPB, 136 pages, 2017, ISBN 978-1534300514)
- Glitterbomb: The Fame Game #1-4 collected as:
  - Volume 1 (collects #1-4, TPB, 120 pages, 2018, ISBN 978-1534304901)

=== Marvel Comics ===
- Thunderbolts (2016-2017) #1-12 collected as:
  - Volume 1 (collects #1-6, TPB, 144 pages, 2017, ISBN 978-0785196686)
  - Volume 2 (collects #7-12, TPB, 144 pages, 2017, ISBN 978-0785196693)
- Uncanny Avengers #26-30 collected as:
  - Volume 5 (collects #26-30, TPB, 112 pages, 2018, ISBN 978-1302906450)
- Avengers:
  - Avengers #675-690 collected as:
    - Avengers: No Surrender (collects #675-690, TPB, 352 pages, 2018, ISBN 978-1302911454)
      - The following year, Marvel released a "spiritual sequel" by the same writing team in the form of a weekly 10-issue limited series that introduced Conan the Barbarian into the Marvel Universe:
        - Avengers: No Road Home #1–10 (with Mark Waid, Paco Medina, Sean Izaakse and Carlo Barberi (#8), 2019) collected as Avengers: No Road Home (tpb, 256 pages, 2019, ISBN 1-302-91485-5)
  - Marvel's Avengers: Road to A-Day (112 pages, Marvel Comics, 2020, 978-0-7851-9465-1) collects:
    - Marvel's Avengers: Hulk (one-shot, 2020)
    - Marvel's Avengers: Iron Man (one-shot, 2020)
    - Marvel's Avengers: Thor (one-shot, 2020)
  - Avengers #1.MU
  - Avengers Unlimited Infinity Comic #14-16, 27-32
  - Avengers: Child Life #1
  - Avengers: Tech-On #1-6
- Alpha Flight: True North #1
- Black Panther and the Agents of Wakanda #1-8
- Champions Vol. 2 (2016-2019) #19-27, Vol. 3 (2019) #1-10 collected as:
  - Champions Volume 4: Northern Lights (collects #19-21 and Infinity Countdown: Champions #1-2, TPB, 112 pages, 2018, ISBN 978-1302909826)
  - Champions Volume 5: Weird War One (collects #22-27, TPB, 176 pages, 2019, ISBN 978-1302915056)
  - Champions by Jim Zub Volume 1: Beat the Devil (collects #1-5, TPB, 136 Pages, 2019, ISBN 1302916718)
  - Champions by Jim Zub Volume 2: Give and Take (collects #7-10, TPB, 112 Pages, 2019, ISBN 1302916726)
- Conan the Barbarian (Vol. 3) #13-25
- Conan: Serpent War #1-4
- Devil's Reign: Omega #1
- Empyre: Avengers #1-3
- Figment #1-5
- Figment 2 #1-5
- Heroes Reborn: Young Squadron #1
- Hunt for Wolverine: Mystery in Madripoor #1-4
- Infinity Countdown: Champions #1-2
- Infinity Warps #1-2
- Investing in Each Other! #1
- Life of Wolverine #1
- Marvel Comics #1000 (Blade Week, illustrated by Nick Bradshaw, anthology, 2019) collected in Marvel Comics 1000 (hc, 144 pages, 2020, ISBN 1-302-92137-1)
- Moon Knight: Black, White & Blood #3
- Ms. Marvel (Vol. 4) #38
- Murderworld (112 pages, Marvel Comics, 2023, 9781302947224) collects:
  - Murderworld: Avengers
  - Murderworld: Spider-Man
  - Murderworld: Wolverine
  - Murderworld: Moon Knight
  - Murderworld: Game Over
- Predator: Black, White & Blood #3
- Savage Sword of Conan (Vol. 2) #7-9
- Secret Empire: United #1
- Secret Warps: Arachknight Annual

=== Oni Press ===
Rick and Morty limited series:

- Rick and Morty vs. Dungeons & Dragons #1-4 (co-written with Patrick Rothfuss) collected in Volume 1 (collects #1-4, TPB, 120 pages, 2019, ISBN 978-1684054169)
- Rick and Morty vs. Dungeons & Dragons: Chapter II: Painscape #1-4 (co-written with Sarah Stern) collected in Volume 2 (collects #1-4, TPB, 2020, ISBN 978-1620106907)
- Rick and Morty vs. Dungeons & Dragons: The Meeseeks Adventure #1 (2022)
- Rick and Morty vs. Cthulhu #1-4 collected in Volume 1 (collects #1-4, TPB, 112 pages, 2023, ISBN 9781637152218)

Other collected editions:

- Rick and Morty vs. Dungeons & Dragons: Deluxe Edition (September 2021, ISBN 978-1-62010-875-8) which collects Rick and Morty vs. Dungeons & Dragons #1-4 & Rick and Morty vs. Dungeons & Dragons: Chapter II: Painscape #1-4, and Rick and Morty vs. Dungeons & Dragons: The Meeseeks Adventure
- Rick and Morty vs. Dungeons & Dragons: The Complete Adventures (October 2022, ISBN 9781684056491) which collects Rick and Morty vs. Dungeons & Dragons #1-4 & Rick and Morty vs. Dungeons & Dragons: Chapter II: Painscape #1-4, and Rick and Morty vs. Dungeons & Dragons: The Meeseeks Adventure

=== Titan Comics ===
- Conan the Barbarian (2023) #0-present
- Conan: Battle of the Black Stone #0-4
- Conan: Scourge of the Serpent #0-4

=== UDON Entertainment ===
- Exalted #0-5
- Makeshift Miracle Vol. 1: The Girl From Nowhere
- Makeshift Miracle Vol. 2: The Boy Who Stole Everything
- Street Fighter Unlimited #1, Annual #1
- Street Fighter II Turbo #8
- Street Fighter Masters: Elena #1
- Street Fighter Legends: Ibuki #1-4
- Street Fighter Legends: Cammy #1-4
- Super Street Fighter #3, 5-6

=== Valiant Comics ===
- Shadowman #8, 11
