= Makeshift Miracle =

- Author: Jim Zub
- Illustrator: Shun Hong Chan
- Website: http://makeshiftmiracle.keenspot.com/
- Current status/schedule: Concluded
- Launch date: September 26, 2011
- End date: July 9, 2014
- Publisher: UDON Entertainment
- Genre(s): Fantasy, Coming-of-age

Makeshift Miracle is a surreal fantasy coming-of-age webcomic created by Jim Zub, suitable for young teen readers.

== History ==
=== The Makeshift Miracle ===
Initially titled The Makeshift Miracle, the story was originally serialized online three pages per week on Mondays, Wednesdays, and Fridays as a webcomic from September 10, 2001 until its conclusion on March 4, 2003.

In February 2002, The Makeshift Miracle became one of the launch titles part of the web comics umbrella known as Modern Tales and stayed as a part of the MT archive structure until it finished its run. In July 2003, The Makeshift Miracle was offered for 99 cents as a complete digital graphic novel through Bitpass. It was the second comic content offered for sale through Bitpass, the first being Scott McCloud's story, The Right Number.

In November 2006, The Makeshift Miracle was released in print as a 200 page graphic novel published by UDON Entertainment, making it the first wholly creator-owned content published by the Toronto based comic company. The published version of Makeshift Miracle has been remastered for print, with crisper line art and higher quality lettering than its original 72 dpi web comic version.

=== Makeshift Miracle ===
On September 26, 2011, in cooperation with UDON Entertainment, Zubkavich relaunched the title in an expanded and revised format as Makeshift Miracle, featuring new art drawn by Shun Hong Chan. Serialized online like its original incarnation, Makeshift Miracle was updated twice a week, every Monday and Friday. The relaunched title ended its run on July 9, 2014.

Since the title's inception, UDON Entertainment has collected the first six chapters of Makeshift Miracle into a graphic novel titled The Girl From Nowhere, published on June 5, 2012, and the remaining seven chapters into a sequel Titled The Boy Who Stole Everything, published on January 20, 2015.

== Plot ==
Colby Reynolds is a disillusioned youth who's got a lot on his mind. His views on the world are changing and the negative aspects of his awkward teenage years are staring him full in the face.

His parents go away on a vacation, leaving him with more time alone than he's ever had before. Feeling a bit adventurous, he wanders around the city, seeing it for the first time really by himself. Feeling compelled on some strange level, he ventures to the outskirts of the city and relaxes under the stars, absorbing the stillness of the moment. That is, until something crashes from the night sky, nearly killing him.

The source of the crash is a girl named Iris, who seems to have no memory of her past or recollection of how she got there. Stranger still, she seems to have brought quite a bit of trouble to Colby's life, as he finds himself drifting aimlessly through strange daydreams and discovering a tree growing in his living room. After a harsh argument with Iris over her inability to explain any of the weird events, Colby finds a passageway to "somewhere else" and decides to confront whatever comes next head on by climbing in.

Colby's nosey friend Blake comes by the house to say hello and finds a lot more than he bargained for. An oddly clad man named Esurio is at the house, looking for Colby, with Iris nowhere to be found. Esurio seems to have found something interesting while investigating the field where Iris crashed, and he's looking for answers from our protagonist.

Once Esurio realizes that Colby's out of sight, he focuses his efforts on Blake and offers to help Blake's childhood dreams be fulfilled. Dreams that he's buried out of fear, regret and bitterness. Scared or desperate, Blake decides to play Esurio's bluff on the small chance that he may be telling the truth. After all, being a powerful King is better than being a scared teenager in a big world.

Colby found a new landscape that isn't in any atlas. According to an old man he's met there named Veridicus, this land is a "snare for the dreams that people have in their youth". Dreamworld or not, Colby has crossed over in body and soul, making it just as dangerous as anywhere "real".

== Similarities to Other Works ==
Zub openly admits that Neil Gaiman is an influence and many of the elements, such as the mask and dream themes, can be seen in Gaiman's The Sandman series.

== Main characters ==
=== Colby Reynolds ===
Colby is a young teenage boy on the cusp of maturity learning to deal with his thoughts and feelings. Mostly introverted, he doesn't seem to relate well to the other students at his high school.

=== Blake Matthews ===
Blake is one of Colby's only friends at school. He's become a bit of a fixture, seemingly gravitating towards Colby as someone to pal around with.

=== Iris ===
Iris is a mysterious young girl who (quite literally) comes crashing into Colby's life out the blue. She has no memories of who she is or where she's come from.

=== Esurio ===
A mysterious goggled man from the dream realm who knows the secret that binds Colby and Iris together.
