= Wayward (comics) =

Fantasy comic book series

- Cover art for Wayward Vol. 1 by Steven Cummings and Tamra Bonvillain.

Publication information
- Publisher: Image Comics
- Schedule: Monthly
- Format: Ongoing series
- Genre: Fantasy
- Publication date: August 2014 - October 2018
- No. of issues: 30
- Main character: Rori Lane

Creative team
- Created by: Jim Zub; Steven Cummings
- Written by: Jim Zub
- Artist: Steven Cummings
- Penciller: Steven Cummings
- Inker: Steven Cummings
- Letterer: Marshall M. Dillon
- Colorist(s): John Rauch; Tamra Bonvillain

Collected editions
- SC Vol 1 (#1–5): ISBN 978-1632151735
- SC Vol 2 (#6–10): ISBN 978-1632154033
- SC Vol 3 (#11–15): ISBN 978-1632157010
- SC Vol 4 (#16–20): ISBN 978-1534300538
- HC Vol 1 (#1–10): ISBN 978-1632154736
- HC Vol 2 (#11-20): ISBN 978-1534302174

Wayward is a comic book series written by Jim Zub, drawn by Steven Cummings, colored by Tamra Bonvillain, with flats by Ludwig Olimba, and letters by Marshall Dillon. Its publication, by Image Comics, began in 2014 and ended in 2018.

== Publication history ==
Image Comics announced that Wayward would be released in August 2014. Often pitched as the modern Buffy the Vampire Slayer, Wayward was initially successful enough to warrant a reprint of both the first and second issues. Issue 30 has been confirmed to be the final issue.

== Plot ==
Rori Lane, a young woman, moves to Tokyo from Ireland where she starts school and tries to establish herself and re-connect with her mother. She is quickly caught up in supernatural events, forming alliances and trying to defend herself and her loved ones from mythical monsters.

== Characters ==
Ayane
A "cat girl" formed from the spirit energy of a group of stray Japanese cats.

Inaba Kami
A kitsune ronin warrior who prefers to stay in her human form.

Nikaido Kazuaki
A homeless teen boy who absorbs emotional energy and can release it in waves of calm or destruction.

Ohara Emi
A teen girl who can control and manipulate man made objects/materials.

Rori Lane
The protagonist of Wayward. A half Japanese, half Irish teenager with the power to see and manipulate 'threads' of power and destiny.

Segawa Touru
A teen boy hacker who can control electronic networks and machines with his mind.

Shirai Tomohiro
A teen boy who eats spirits to survive and augment his abilities.

== Reception ==
Wayward was overall a well-reviewed title with an average rating of 8.7/10 from 215 critic reviews over its 30-issue span.

== In other media ==
The American board game company IDW Games announced on May 18, 2017, that they were collaborating with Wayward author Jim Zub on a board game modeled after the comic book. The game is to be fully cooperative, with players assuming the roles of the comic's heroes fighting to defeat villains controlled by the game. Jon Gilmour was announced as designer for the Wayward board game.

It has also been announced that rights have been acquired by United Kingdom company Manga Entertainment in order to develop a Japanese animated or live action series.

== Collected editions ==
Trade paperbacks
Title	Material collected	Publication date	ISBN
Wayward – Vol. One: String Theory	Wayward #1–5	March 25, 2015	978-1632151735
Wayward – Vol. Two: Ties That Bind	Wayward #6–10	August 26, 2015	978-1632154033
Wayward – Vol. Three: Out From the Shadows	Wayward #11–15	May 25, 2016	978-1632157010
Wayward – Vol. Four: Threads and Portents	Wayward #16–20	March 1, 2017	978-1534300538
Wayward – Vol. Five: Tethered Souls	Wayward #21–25	February 6, 2018	978-1534303508
Wayward - Vol. Six: Bound to Fate	Wayward #26–30	December 11, 2018	978-1534308749

Deluxe hardcovers
Title	Material collected	Additional material	Publication date	ISBN
Wayward – Book One	Wayward #1–10	Issue #1–10 Cover Illustrations; Design Sketches; Essay on Japanese Culture	November 19, 2014	978-1632154736
Wayward – Book Two	Wayward #11–20	5-part Wayward connected cover poster from #11–15; Issue #11–20 Cover Illustrations; Design Sketches; Essay on Japanese Monster Mythology	April 19, 2017	978-1534302174
Wayward – Book Three	Wayward #21–30	5-part Wayward connected cover poster from #26–30; Issue #21–30 Cover Illustrations; Design Sketches; Essay on culture and mythology	May 28, 2019	978-1534312098
