= Pantheon High =

Manga series

- Cover of Pantheon High vol. 1 (2007), art by Steven Cummings
- Genre: Fantasy
- Author: Paul Benjamin
- Illustrator: Steven Cummings, Megumi Cummings
- Publisher: (United States) (United Kingdom) Tokyopop
- Original run: 2007–2008
- Volumes: 3

Pantheon High is an original English-language manga written by Paul Benjamin and illustrated by Steven Cummings, with inking by Cummings' wife, Megumi. It is published in the United States and United Kingdom by Tokyopop.

== Plot ==
Pantheon High is a school for the demi-god children of various deities. Among the many attending the school is the troubled daughter of Tyr, the (seemingly) suicidal son of Hades, the popular daughter of the Egyptian sun God Ra, and the extremely lucky son of Benten, the Japanese goddess of luck, love and the arts. Several of the more amoral children develop a plan to become full blown gods, leaving only a few of the students to oppose them.

Book two begins with two of the protagonists attending another school as the repercussions of the Pantheon High events are still being worked out. Once again, popular cliques and abusive students cause minor problems. Additionally, once everyone returns to Pantheon High, the protagonists discover a plot by four evil gods—Chronus, Susano, Set, and Loki—that could result in the destruction of their friends and all other divinities.

Book three features the four protagonists chasing down three of the villains from the first volume, who escaped captivity in volume 2. At the same time, the masterminds of all the evil deeds thus far complete their plans and brainwash all the other students as well as their divine parents. The protagonists must return to Pantheon High to fight to free their friends and save all the pantheons.

=== Gods ===
It is mentioned in the preview for second book that despite the fact that only children of Egyptian, Norse, Japanese, and Greek gods go to Pantheon High, children of Aztec, Indian, Hawaiian and Mesopotamian deities go to rival school Gilgamesh High. A Chinese pantheon has been mentioned, but the student from that pantheon turned out to be a morphed Loki.

All gods in the series are incredibly powerful compared to a normal mortal, and their power is concentrated in an "icon", a weapon or item that symbolized themselves, like Zeus' thunderbolts, Hades' helm, Thor's hammer (Mjölnir). When the icon is broken, the immortal disappears, but immortals can apparently have their icons replaced or taken and not disappear.

So far, it is unknown if the rest of the world knows of the gods. Modern day vehicles are seen parked side by side with other more exotic forms of transportation, such as flying boats and war-elephants.

== Main characters ==
- Aziza el Ra: Aziza is the daughter of Ra, the sun god that is the head of the Egyptian pantheon. A popular cheerleader, she has the power to control her internal temperature, which comes in good use many times. She is also very arrogant, looks down on her classmates and is quite self-absorbed. Over time, however, she mellows out and becomes a kinder person.
- Grace Morgenstern: Grace is the daughter of Tyr, the Norse God of war, but unlike her father, Grace likes to study and finds it pointless to fight. As a 'Tyrspawn', it is foretold she will lose a hand, which effects her deeply in multiple aspects of the story. She's the classic straight A+ student.
- Griffin Pierce: Griffin is the son of Hades, the Greek lord of the Underworld (not to be confused with Thanatos, the personification of death). His mortal mother is dead and he lives with foster parents. Griffin wants to be with his birth parents, so he comes across as what would be considered suicidal. He spreads the rumor he has a 'death touch', which isn't exactly true. He can however inflict poetic justice on an opponent, such as giving them swirlies in a toilet (Son of Argus' punishment) or barraging them with dodgeballs (Abby's punishment). He was killed thrice in the 1st volume, but was sent back to the living by Charon (mythology) because his dad wanted him to live.
- Yukio Takahashi: Son of the Japanese luck goddess Benten. Yukio has excellent grades despite never studying thanks to his supernatural luck, and is a sports star as well. His typical teenage maleness interferes with his luck; at one point he crashes into a wall during battle as a female adversary had become attractively over-exposed.

== Minor characters ==
- Principal Prometheus: The principal of Pantheon High, and a Titan. Tries to convince the school board to bring back an old punishment (having an eagle rip out their livers, mimicking the punishment imposed on him by Zeus.) The mastermind of all the evil plots; is returned to his old punishment following the exposure of his plot and his murder of Ra at the end of the series.
- Mr. Heimdallson: The hall monitor, son of Heimdall. Eaten by Jormundgand, the Midgard serpent and brother of Fenrir.
- Tierce: The school's mascot, a chimera. Initially fierce and dangerous, he becomes meek and more like a dog after Grace defeats him.
- Coach Hercules: The famous hero and son of Zeus. He's the gym teacher and coach for the school
- Chris Lokispawn: Loki's child, whose gender is unknown. Even less can be said with their gender neutral name and ability to shapeshift. It leaves it even more ambiguous when they say they doesn't use the locker rooms, saying "I don't need a locker room to change" and "this place smells like anus", when referring to the boy's locker room. They avoid the eagle torture by moving their liver to the outside and severing their nerves. Eventually they escape and help the kids, but Yukio remarks that "He..er...she...er...Chris is only looking out for Chris." Chris additionally helps the protagonists several times in Volume 3.
- Fadil el Set: Son of Set, Egyptian god of evil, chaos, and the desert. Known for being a gangsta wanna-be, though he lives in Beverly Hills. Chris Lokispawn reveals that his "gangsta talk" is more torture than having to have their liver ripped out. He is the only one to actually get the torture of having his liver ripped out.
- Abby: Daughter of Cronus, ruler of the Titans (not Chronos, the Greek god of time). She is known for her violent temper and immense dislike of Griffin, whom she constantly calls "pervert." She is also known for her third eye, symbolizing her father also being the brother of the Cyclopes. She is incredibly tough, being both the MVP on the Tlachtli team and having unbreakable skin. This skin saves her from the eagle torture. However, she can be damaged through blunt force.
- Yutaka: son of Susano, Japanese god of storms, thunder, and evil. He is quite full of himself, and only pretends to like Aziza to get her to drink the enchanted ambrosia. However, she gets too hot and she boils the potion, initially starting the four's downfall. His father looks nothing like him, however, resembling a samurai. He electrocutes the eagle sent to torture him.
- Joanna el Isis: Daughter of Isis, Egyptian goddess of magic, motherhood and fertility. She is a friend of Aziza and Katya as well as being a fellow cheerleader. She is a powerful sorceress who can summon the winds and sands of the Nile as well as other mystical feats. She and Katya had a falling out over Yukio, who they were both attracted to because of his luck powers. However Yukio made them patch things up. She helped Yukio and Katya defend Tierce from a rival school and helped Aziza and Yukio fight off the friends of the evil demi-gods. Has a magical scarab so she can contact her mother. At the Homecoming Dance she ends up with Todd Templeton.
- Katya el Bastet: Daughter of the cat-goddess Bastet. A friend of Aziza and Joanna and a cheerleader. She has a human form (but still has cat ears), and also a feral form for fighting. She has a psychic link with her familiar, a cat Scarab. Had a falling out with Joanna over Yukio, who they were both attracted to because of his luck powers. However Yukio made them patch things up. She helped Yukio and Joanna defend Tierce from a rival school and helped Aziza and Yukio fight off the friends of the evil demi-gods. At the Homecoming Dance she ends up with Einar Thorson.
