= Peter Krause (artist) =

American illustrator and comic book artist

- Area: Penciller

Peter Krause is an American illustrator and comic book artist. He is best known for his work on various DC Comics titles, most notably the Superman-related titles and a three-year run on The Power of Shazam! with Captain Marvel and the Marvel Family.

== Biography ==
Krause, a graduate of the University of Minnesota, is married with three children and currently works as a freelance illustrator. Krause's comics work appeared at least as early as 1986. In 2009, Krause collaborated with writer Mark Waid on an independent series entitled Irredeemable for Boom! Studios.
