= Mark Waid =

American comic book writer, born 1962

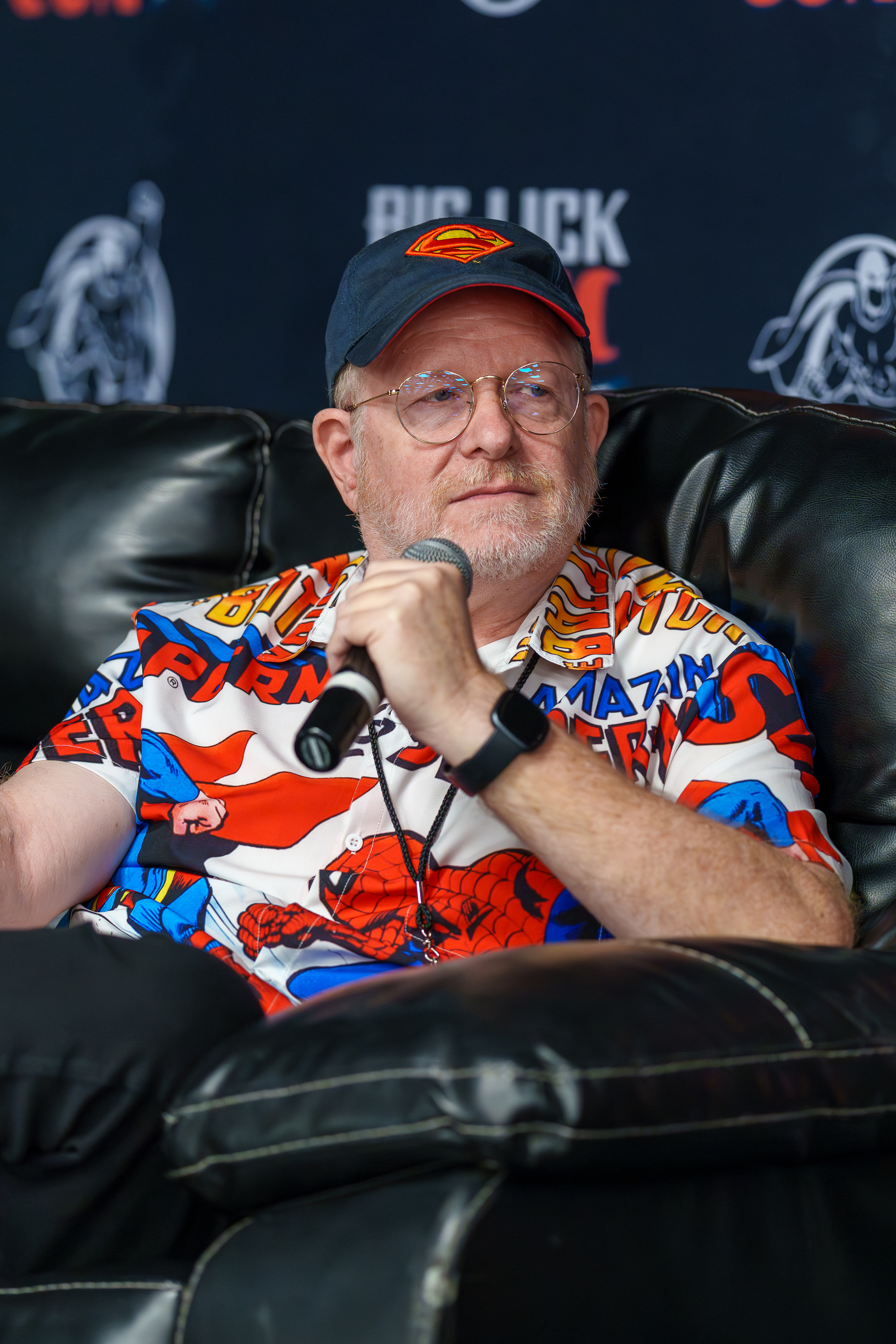
- Waid at Big Lick Comic Con in Roanoke, Virginia in 2026
- Born: March 21, 1962 (age 64) Hueytown, Alabama, U.S.
- Areas: Writer, Editor
- Notable works: The Flash; Captain America; Kingdom Come; JLA: Year One; JLA: Tower of Babel; Fantastic Four; Superman: Birthright; 52; Irredeemable; Daredevil; Batman/Superman: World's Finest
- Awards: Inkpot Award (2012)

Mark Waid (/weɪd/; born March 21, 1962) is an American comic book writer best known for his work on DC Comics titles The Flash, Kingdom Come and Superman: Birthright as well as his work on Captain America, Fantastic Four and Daredevil for Marvel. Other comics publishers he has done work for include Fantagraphics, Event, Top Cow, Dynamite, and Archie Comics.

From August 2007 to December 2010, Waid served as Editor-in-Chief and later Chief Creative Officer of Boom! Studios, where he also published his creator-owned series Irredeemable and Incorruptible.

In October 2018, Waid joined Humanoids Publishing as Director of Creative Development before being promoted to Publisher in February 2020. Waid left Humanoids to return to freelancing in 2022.

== Early life ==
Waid was born in Hueytown, Alabama. He stated in a 2000 interview that "the single most influential-to-my-craft story I ever read" was Adventure Comics #369–370 (1968), the two-part "Legion of Super-Heroes" story by Jim Shooter and Mort Weisinger that introduced the villain Mordru.

== Career ==
=== 1980s–1990s ===
Waid entered the comics field during the mid-1980s as an editor and writer on Fantagraphics Books' comic book fan magazine, Amazing Heroes. Waid's first comic book story "The Puzzle of the Purloined Fortress", an eight-page Superman story, was published in Action Comics #572 (Oct. 1985).

In 1987, Waid was hired as an editor for DC Comics where he worked on such titles as Action Comics, Doom Patrol, Infinity, Inc., Legion of Super-Heroes, Secret Origins, and Wonder Woman, as well as various one-shots including Batman: Gotham by Gaslight. With Gotham by Gaslight, and in tandem with writer Brian Augustyn, Waid co-created DC's Elseworlds imprint.

In 1989 Waid left editorial work for freelance writing assignments. He worked for DC's short-lived Impact Comics line where he wrote The Comet and scripted dialogue for Legend of the Shield.

In 1992 Waid began the assignment which would bring him to wider recognition in the comics industry, when he was hired to write The Flash by editor Brian Augustyn. Waid stayed on the title for an eight-year run. He wrote a Metamorpho limited series in 1993 and created the character known as Impulse in The Flash (vol. 2) #92 (July 1994). Impulse was launched into his own series in April 1995 by Waid and artist Humberto Ramos. In November of that same year, Waid and Howard Porter collaborated on the Underworld Unleashed limited series, which served as the center of a company-wide crossover storyline.

His first major project for Marvel Comics was as one of the writers of the "Age of Apocalypse" crossover. He later co-created the Onslaught character for the X-Men line.

Marvel editors Ralph Macchio and Mark Gruenwald hired him as Gruenwald's successor as writer of Captain America, during which Waid was paired with artist Ron Garney. Waid and Garney garnered critical praise for their run on the title, remaining on it until the title was relaunched with a different creative team as part of the 1996–1997 "Heroes Reborn" storyline. Rob Liefeld offered Waid the opportunity to script Captain America over plots and artwork by his studio, but Waid declined. That storyline ran a full year, after which Waid and Garney returned to the title for another relaunched series, Captain America volume 3, issues #1–23. Waid also wrote the short-lived spin-off series Captain America: Sentinel of Liberty from 1998 to 1999, having written 10 of the 12 issues (skipping issues #7 and 10).

In 1996, Waid and artist Alex Ross produced the graphic novel Kingdom Come. This story, set in the future of the DC Universe, depicted the fate of Superman, Batman, Wonder Woman, and other heroes as the world around them changed. It was written in reaction to the "grim and gritty" comics of the 1980s and 1990s. DC Comics writer and executive Paul Levitz observed that "Waid's deep knowledge of the heroes' pasts served them well, and Ross' unique painted art style made a powerful statement about the reality of the world they built." Many of the ideas introduced in Kingdom Come were later integrated into the present-day DC Universe, and Waid himself wrote a follow-up to the series, The Kingdom.

Waid and writer Grant Morrison collaborated on a number of projects that would successfully reestablish DC's Justice League to prominence. Waid's contributions included JLA: Year One, as well as work on the ongoing series. The two writers developed the concept of Hypertime to explain problems with continuity in the DC Universe, which was first introduced in The Kingdom.

=== 2000s ===
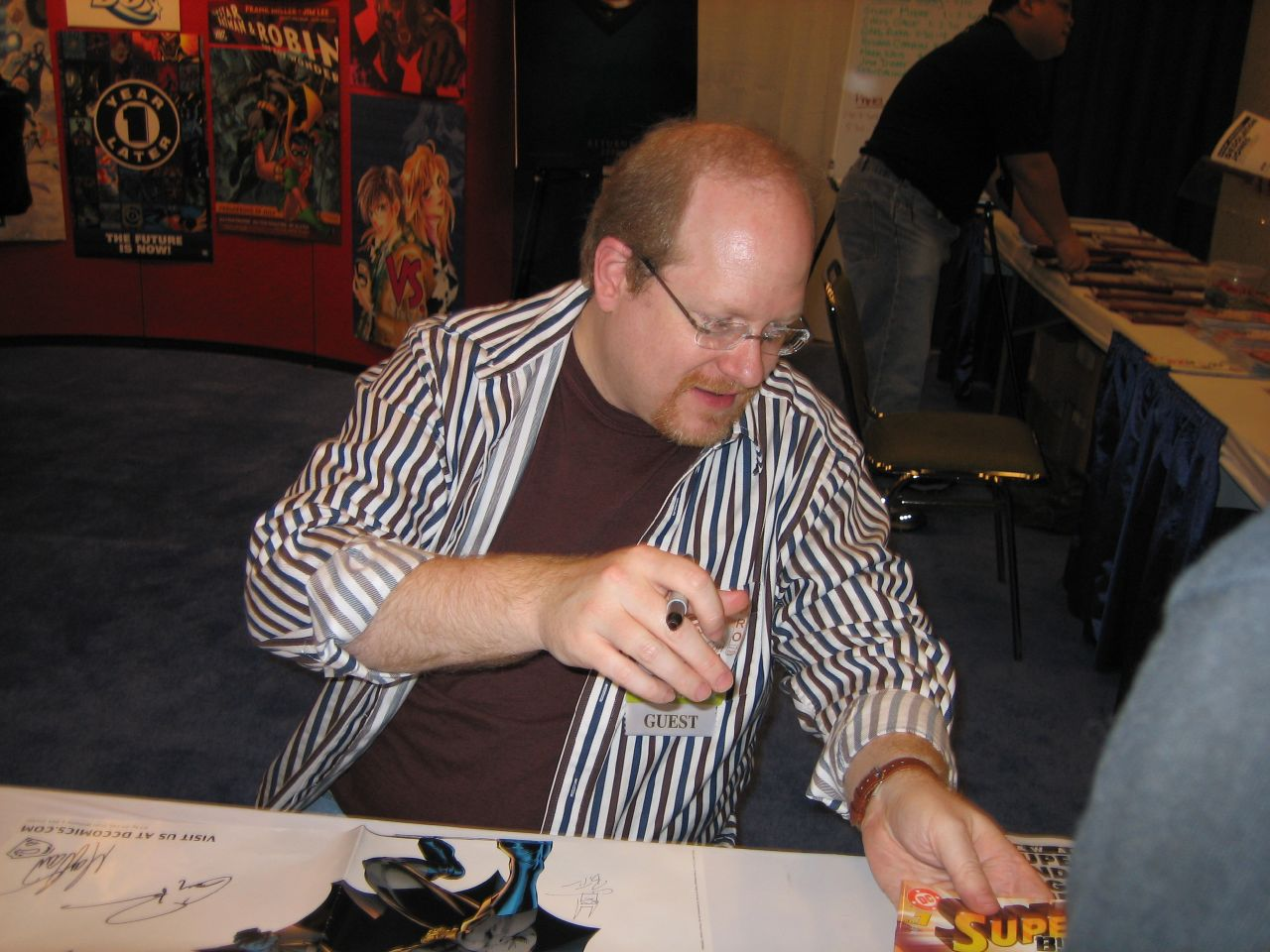
Waid at Wondercon 2006

Waid collaborated with artists Bryan Hitch and Paul Neary on JLA and the JLA: Heaven's Ladder (Oct. 2000) one-shot.

In 2000, Waid co-wrote a series named Empire with Barry Kitson, whose protagonist was a Doctor Doom-like supervillain named Golgoth who had defeated all superheroes and conquered the world. The series was originally published by Gorilla Comics, a company formed by Waid, Kurt Busiek and several others, but the company folded after only two issues were published. Empire was completed under the DC Comics label in 2003 and 2004. Waid wrote the first year of Crossgen's Ruse series.

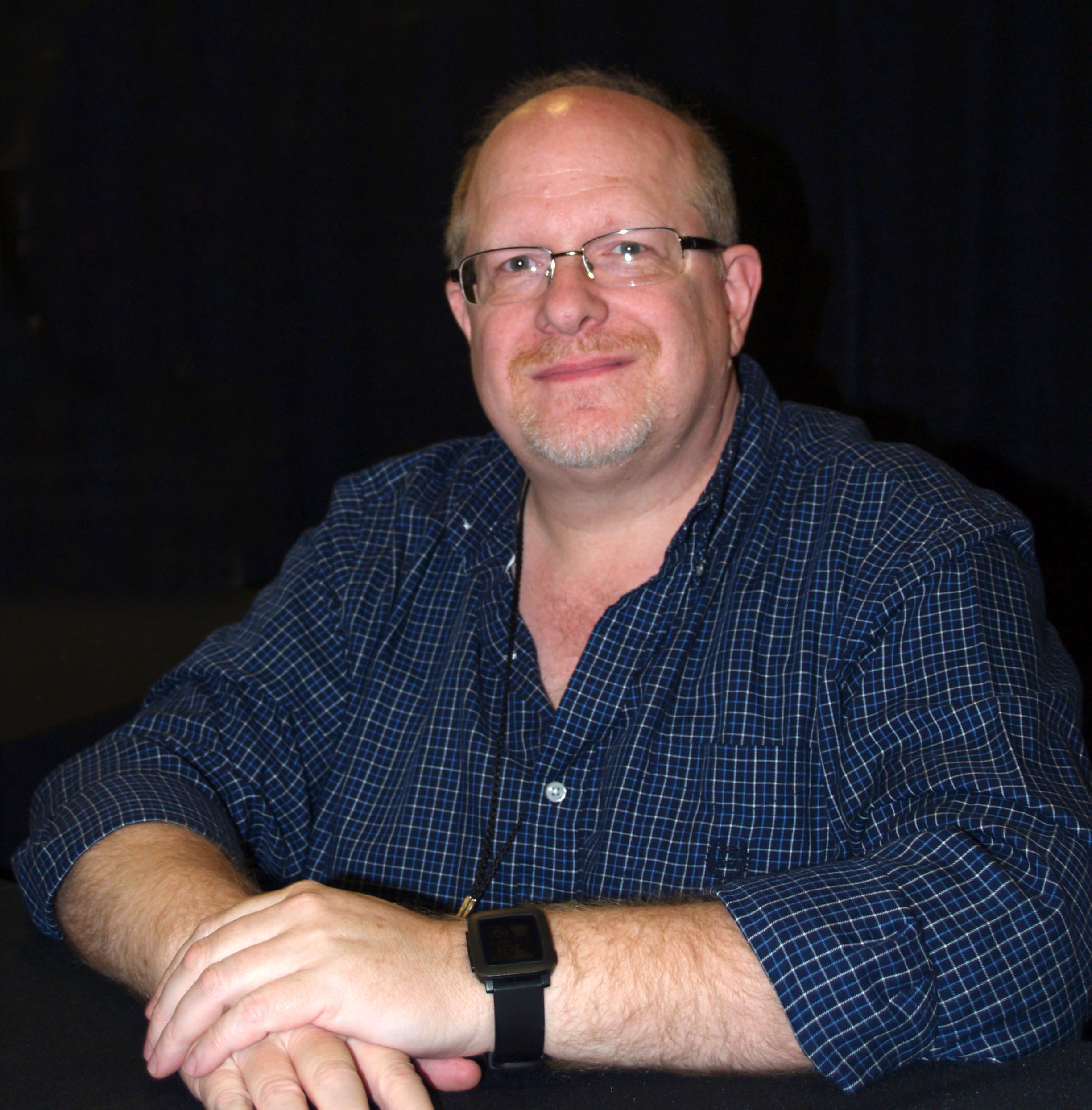
Waid at the East Coast Comicon in Secaucus, New Jersey

Waid began an acclaimed run as writer of Marvel's Fantastic Four in 2002 with his former Flash artist Mike Wieringo, with Marvel releasing their debut issue, Fantastic Four vol. 3 #60 (Oct. 2002) at the promotional price of 9 cents U.S. By June 2003, Marvel publisher Bill Jemas tried to convince Waid to abandon his "high-adventure" approach to the series, and making the book into, in Waid's words, "a wacky suburban dramedy where Reed's a nutty professor who creates amazing but impractical inventions, Sue's the office-temp breadwinner, the cranky neighbor is their new 'arch-enemy,' etc." Waid, who felt that this was too much of a departure from what he had been hired to write, initially declined. After some discussion with editor Tom Brevoort, Waid found a way to make the requested changes, but by then, the decision had been made to fire Waid and Wieringo from the series. The resulting fan backlash led to Waid and Wieringo's reinstatement on the title by that September. Waid and Wieringo completed their run on Fantastic Four with issue #524 (May 2005), by which time the previously relaunched series had returned to its original numbering.

In 2003 Waid wrote the origin of the "modern" Superman with Superman: Birthright, a twelve-part limited series which was meant to be the new official origin story of the Man of Steel. Birthright contained several characters and elements from the Silver and Modern Age Superman comic books and homages to Superman: The Movie and the Smallville television series.

Waid returned to writing Legion of Super-Heroes in December 2004, teaming again with Barry Kitson. He finished his run on the series with issue #30 (July 2007). In 2005, Waid signed a two-year exclusive contract with DC Comics. He co-wrote the 52 limited series with Grant Morrison, Geoff Johns, Greg Rucka, and Keith Giffen that lasted for one year and covered the events that take place during the year in the DC Universe following Infinite Crisis. Another project for DC was a new launch of The Brave and the Bold with artist George Pérez, and a brief return to The Flash.

On July 27, 2007, at San Diego Comic-Con, Boom! Studios announced that Waid would join Boom! as Editor-in-Chief the following month. As his non-creator assignments at DC lapsed, he stated that all his future creator-owned work will be with Boom!.

Waid was promoted to Chief Creative Officer of BOOM! Studios in August 2010. That December, Waid announced he would be leaving that role, and return to freelance work, though he would continue writing for the publisher.

In the late 2000s Waid worked on the Spider-Man creative team, writing several issues of The Amazing Spider-Man, including a meeting between Spider-Man and Stephen Colbert in The Amazing Spider-Man #573 (Dec. 2008).

=== 2010s ===
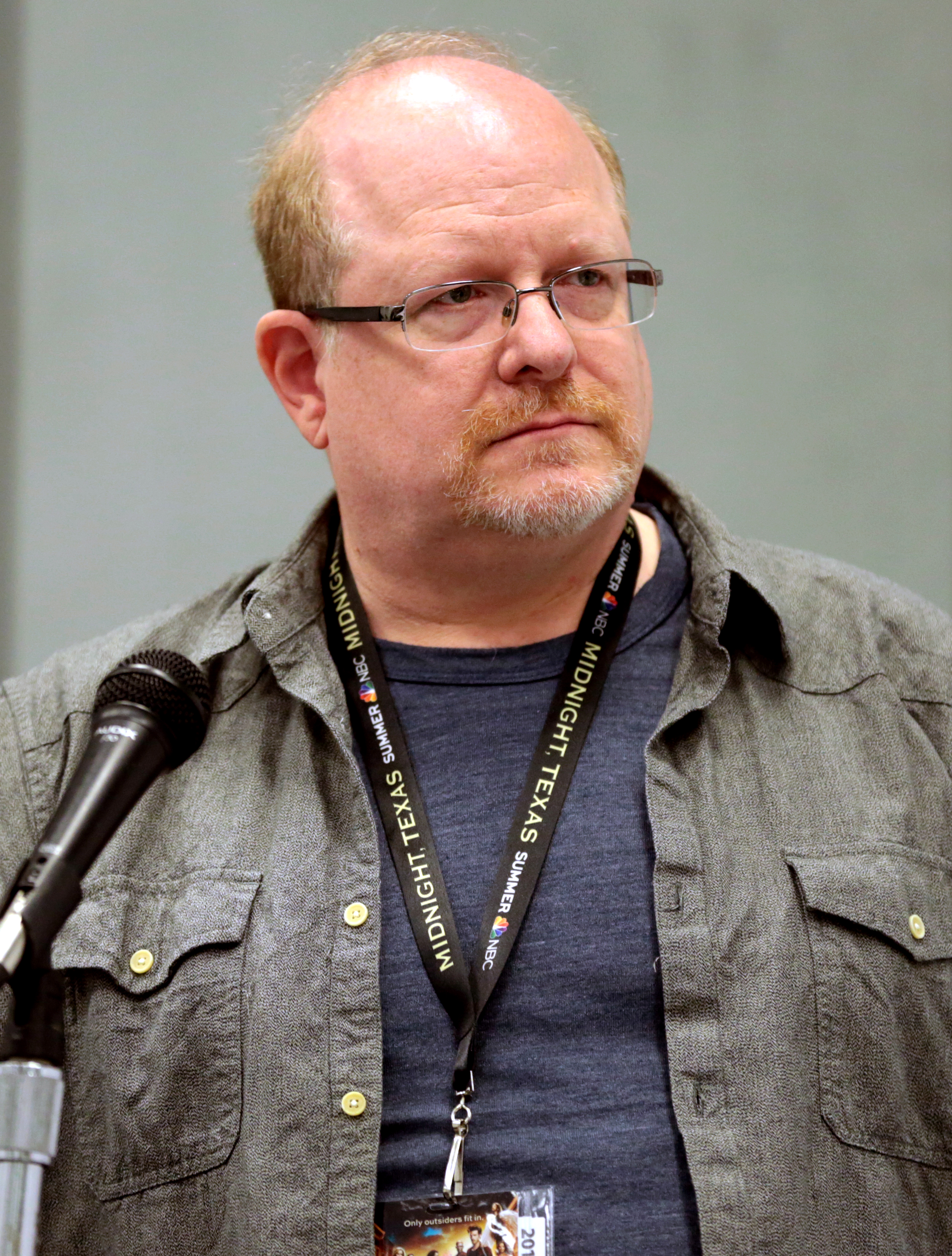
Waid at WonderCon 2017

Waid scripted the opening of "The Gauntlet" storyline in issue #612 (Jan. 2010). Waid wrote the Doctor Strange mini-series Strange, and several series for Boom! Studios, notably Irredeemable with artist Peter Krause and its spinoff Incorruptible. In July 2011 Marvel relaunched a monthly Daredevil series with Waid on writing duties. Waid and artist Paolo Rivera garnered positive reviews for their work on the title, and earned multiple 2012 Eisner Awards, including Best Continuing Series and Best Single Issue for issue #7. In addition, Waid won Best Writer for his work on Daredevil, as well as his work on Irredeemable, and Incorruptible. Waid received a "Best Writer" Harvey Award as well for his Daredevil work. In November 2012, Waid and artist Leinil Francis Yu launched The Indestructible Hulk series for Marvel.

In 2011, Waid established a free digital comics website Thrillbent, launching the site with the title Insufferable. An essay posted on October 2, 2013, by Waid, titled "An Open Letter To Young Freelancers", generated attention within the comics industry with The Hollywood Reporter describing it as "an important commentary on business practices that are in a state of flux at publishers both large and small." In 2014, Waid launched new series for Daredevil and The Hulk with artists Chris Samnee and Mark Bagley respectively. In December 2014, Waid's S.H.I.E.L.D. title began and it introduced several characters from the television series Agents of S.H.I.E.L.D. into the Marvel comics universe. He later wrote All-New, All-Different Avengers, Black Widow, and The Avengers.

Waid and artist J. G. Jones produced Strange Fruit for Boom! Studios in July 2015.

In 2016, Waid and artist Humberto Ramos co-created The Champions for Marvel. The following year, Waid returned to the Captain America series beginning with issue #695 working with artist Chris Samnee. A new Doctor Strange series was launched by Waid and Jesus Saiz in 2018. Waid also launched with artist Javier Garrón a Ant-Man and the Wasp miniseries to tie into the release of the 2019 film of the same name.

At the 2018 New York Comic Con, Humanoids Publishing announced it was creating an imprint called H1 whose contributing creators included Waid.

On April 9, 2019, Marvel announced that Waid would write a five-issue miniseries featuring the Invisible Woman, her first solo series since her debut in 1961.

=== 2020s ===
In December 2021, it was announced that Waid would be writing a new ongoing for DC entitled Batman/Superman: World's Finest, with Dan Mora serving as artist and beginning publication in March 2022. The events of World's Finest would later set up the events of Batman vs Robin and "Lazarus Planet", also written by Waid.

In April 2022, Waid was reported among the more than three dozen comics creators who contributed to Operation USA's benefit anthology book, Comics for Ukraine: Sunflower Seeds, a project spearheaded by IDW Publishing Special Projects Editor Scott Dunbier, whose profits would be donated to relief efforts for Ukrainian refugees resulting from the February 2022 Russian invasion of Ukraine. Waid teamed up with artist Gabriel Rodriguez (artist) to produce an original story with new characters created specifically for the anthology.

In November 2022, it was announced that Waid and Mora would be working on a new ongoing Shazam! series, beginning publication in May 2023. Mora departed from interior work with issue 6, while Waid left writing duties with issue 9.

In April 2023, it was announced that Waid would be writing two new projects for DC set to launch in July 2023. The first is a three-issue DC Black Label miniseries entitled Superman: The Last Days of Lex Luthor, illustrated by Bryan Hitch. It is a spiritual successor to Birthright. The second is a six-issue miniseries entitled World's Finest: Teen Titans, illustrated by Emanuela Lupacchino.

In February 2024, it was announced that Waid would be writing Absolute Power, a 4-issue event miniseries that would conclude the Dawn of DC publishing initiative and lead directly into the DC All-In initiative. The series reunites Waid with artist Dan Mora and follows Amanda Waller, having teamed up with Failsafe and the Brainiac Queen, as she seek to put an end to the metahuman population of the DC Universe, once and for all.

In July 2024, it was announced Waid would be reuniting with Chris Samnee for Batman and Robin: Year One, a 12-issue series set to begin publication in October 2024.

== Legal issues ==
In September 2018 writer Richard Meyer, the creator of the YouTube channel Diversity & Comics, filed a civil lawsuit in Texas against Waid, claiming defamation and tortious interference on Waid's part. Meyer accused Waid of convincing Antarctic Press not to publish Meyer's graphic novel Jawbreakers. Waid launched a GoFundMe campaign to raise money to fight the suit, and denied having anything to do with Antarctic Press' decision, a statement verified in deposition by the publisher of Antarctic Press. Waid's fellow comics creators Neil Gaiman, Kurt Busiek, Dan Slott and Yanick Paquette contributed to his campaign, while artist Ethan Van Sciver began a similar campaign for Meyer which quickly surpassed Waid's in funding. Waid filed for the case to be dismissed. In December 2020, Meyer voluntarily withdrew the lawsuit and reached a confidential agreement.

== Personal life ==
As of 2019, Waid lives in Los Angeles. He previously lived in Los Angeles from 2002-2014 before moving to Indiana to open a comic book shop; after the shop closed, he moved back to Los Angeles in 2019.

== Bibliography ==
Preceded by William Messner-Loebs	The Flash writer 1992–1997 (with Brian Augustyn in 1996–1997)	Succeeded by Grant Morrison; Mark Millar
Preceded by Barry Kitson	L.E.G.I.O.N. '93 writer 1993 (with Barry Kitson)	Succeeded by Tom Peyer
Preceded by Robert Loren Fleming	Valor writer 1993–1994	Succeeded by Kurt Busiek
Preceded by Michael Jan Friedman	Justice League Task Force writer 1994–1995	Succeeded by Christopher Priest
Preceded by Tom McCraw	Legion of Super-Heroes writer 1994–1995 (with Tom McCraw)	Succeeded by Tom Peyer; Tom McCraw
Preceded by Fabian Nicieza	Deadpool writer 1994	Succeeded by Joe Kelly
Preceded by n/a	Impulse writer 1995–1997	Succeeded by William Messner-Loebs
Preceded by Mark Gruenwald	Captain America writer 1995–1996	Succeeded by Rob Liefeld; Jeph Loeb
Preceded by Fabian Nicieza	X-Men writer 1996	Succeeded by Scott Lobdell
Preceded by Mike Carlin	Ka-Zar writer 1997–1998	Succeeded by Christopher Priest
Preceded by James Robinson	Captain America writer 1998–1999	Succeeded by Dan Jurgens
Preceded by Grant Morrison; Mark Millar	The Flash writer 1998–2000 (with Brian Augustyn)	Succeeded by Geoff Johns
Preceded by Grant Morrison	JLA writer 2000–2002	Succeeded by Joe Kelly
Preceded by Adam Warren	Fantastic Four writer 2002–2005	Succeeded by J. Michael Straczynski
Preceded by Gail Simone (The Legion)	Legion of Super-Heroes writer 2005–2007	Succeeded by Tony Bedard (Supergirl and the Legion)
Preceded by Mike Grell; Mike Baron	The Brave and the Bold writer 2007–2008	Succeeded by J. Michael Straczynski
Preceded by Joey Cavalieri	The Flash writer 2007–2008	Succeeded by Tom Peyer
Preceded by Andy Diggle	Daredevil writer 2011–2015	Succeeded by Charles Soule
Preceded by Jason Aaron (The Incredible Hulk)	Hulk writer 2012–2014	Succeeded by Gerry Duggan
Preceded by Jonathan Hickman	The Avengers writer 2015–2018	Succeeded by Jason Aaron
Preceded by Nathan Edmondson	Black Widow writer 2016–2017	Succeeded by Jen and Sylvia Soska
Preceded by Bill Mantlo	Champions writer 2016–2018	Succeeded by Jim Zub
Preceded by Nick Spencer	Captain America writer 2018	Succeeded by Ta-Nehisi Coates
Preceded by Donny Cates	Doctor Strange writer 2018–2020	Succeeded by Jed MacKay (Strange vol. 3)
