= Incorruptible (comics) =

Comic book series (2009–2012)

- Incorruptible #1 (December 2009). Cover art by John Cassaday and colors by Laura Martin.

Publication information
- Publisher: Boom! Studios
- Schedule: Monthly
- Genre: Superhero
- Publication date: December 2009 – May 2012
- No. of issues: 30
- Main character(s): Max Damage; Louis Armadale; Alana Patel; Jailbait

Creative team
- Written by: Mark Waid
- Artists: Horacio Domingues (#5); Marcio Takara (#11–27); Damian Couceiro (#28–30)
- Pencillers: Jean Diaz (#1–4); Horacio Domingues (#6–10)
- Inkers: Belardino Brabo (#1–4); Juan Castro (#6–10); Michael Babinski (#10)
- Letterer: Ed Dukeshire
- Colorists: Andrew Dalhouse (#1–9); Nolan Woodard (#10–30)
- Editors: Matt Gagnon (#1–21); Shannon Waters (#22–30)

Incorruptible is an American comic book series written by Mark Waid and published by Boom! Studios. The series follows former supervillain Max Damage in his quest to become a superhero. The book is a spin-off of another Waid comic, Irredeemable, which follows the transformation of a superhero into a supervillain. Incorruptible #1 was published on December 16, 2009, and the series ended in May 2012, after thirty issues. Marcio Takara is the longest-serving artist on the series, having provided art for sixteen issues since Incorruptible #11 in October 2010. The series concluded alongside Irredeemable in May 2012.

== Publication history ==
Initial pre-publication publicity for Irredeemable, the parent series of Incorruptible, utilized the tagline "Mark Waid is Evil! Mark Waid is Irredeemable!", which culminated with the release of a limited edition "Mark Waid is Evil" t-shirt at the 2009 New York Comic Con. Promotion for Incorruptible follows a similar vein, with the use of the tagline "Mark Waid was Evil, Mark Waid is Incorruptible"

Incorruptible #1 was first released in December 2009 with pencils provided by Jean Diaz, ink by Belardino Brabo and colors by Andrew Dalhouse. Two alternate covers were provided for the issue: the first by John Cassaday, with colors by Laura Martin, and the second by Tim Sale, with inks by Paul Azaceta and colors by Matthew Wilson. A third limited-edition cover drawn by Jeffrey Spokes was also made available, appearing on one in every ten copies of the book.

Diaz and Brabo left the series after issue four (March 2010), with Horacio Domingues taking on art duties for Incorruptible #5 (April 2010). Starting with issue six (May 2010), Domingues provided pencils, with inks by Juan Castro. Incorruptible #10 (September 2010) saw the departure of colorist Dalhouse, replaced by Nolan Woodard, and the addition of Michael Babinski on inks. Issue eleven (October 2010) saw Babinski, Domingues and Castro leave the series, replaced by Marcio Takara as the sole artist.

On February 3, 2012, Waid announced that he was bringing both Irredeemable and Incorruptible to an end with issues #37 and #30 respectively in May 2012. Waid stated that he was "stretched thin right now both personally and professionally", and that Max Damage's character arc was reaching its end.

== Development ==
Incorruptible was developed as a spin-off to the comic series Irredeemable that follows the premise of what happens when a supervillain becomes a superhero. In September 2009, newcomer Neil Edwards had been announced as artist on the series, but by the time of release of the first issue, he had been replaced by Jean Diaz. Before the launch of the series, the central character of Max Damage had been intended to rename himself to Max Daring as a superhero. In a November 2010 interview, Waid confirmed that the name change had been abandoned as he felt that, unlike the Plutonian to whom branding would be important, Max "could not possibly care less what anyone else in the world thinks of him" and he would not be interested in adopting a heroic moniker.

In August 2010, Waid stated that he preferred writing Incorruptible to Irredeemable, saying "Max is just funnier. There's just no humor in 'Irredeemable.' To make 'Irredeemable' work well, I have got to look into ugly, ugly parts of my soul.".

Starting in Irredeemable #19 (November 2010) and continuing through to Irredeemable #27 (July 2011), the Plutonian is finally defeated by an alien force, captured, and taken off world. Waid wanted to remove the Plutonian from Earth in order for Max to be able to "establish himself as the law" in Incorruptible. Waid confirmed that the Plutonian would make his debut in the Incorruptible comic in Incorruptible #22, the Plutonian's return leading to a confrontation with Max. In August 2011, Waid confirmed a new sidekick for Max, "Hate Crime", the reformed villain "Safeword"—Max's third sidekick after "Jailbait" and "Headcase".

== Plot ==
=== Volume 1 (#1–4) ===
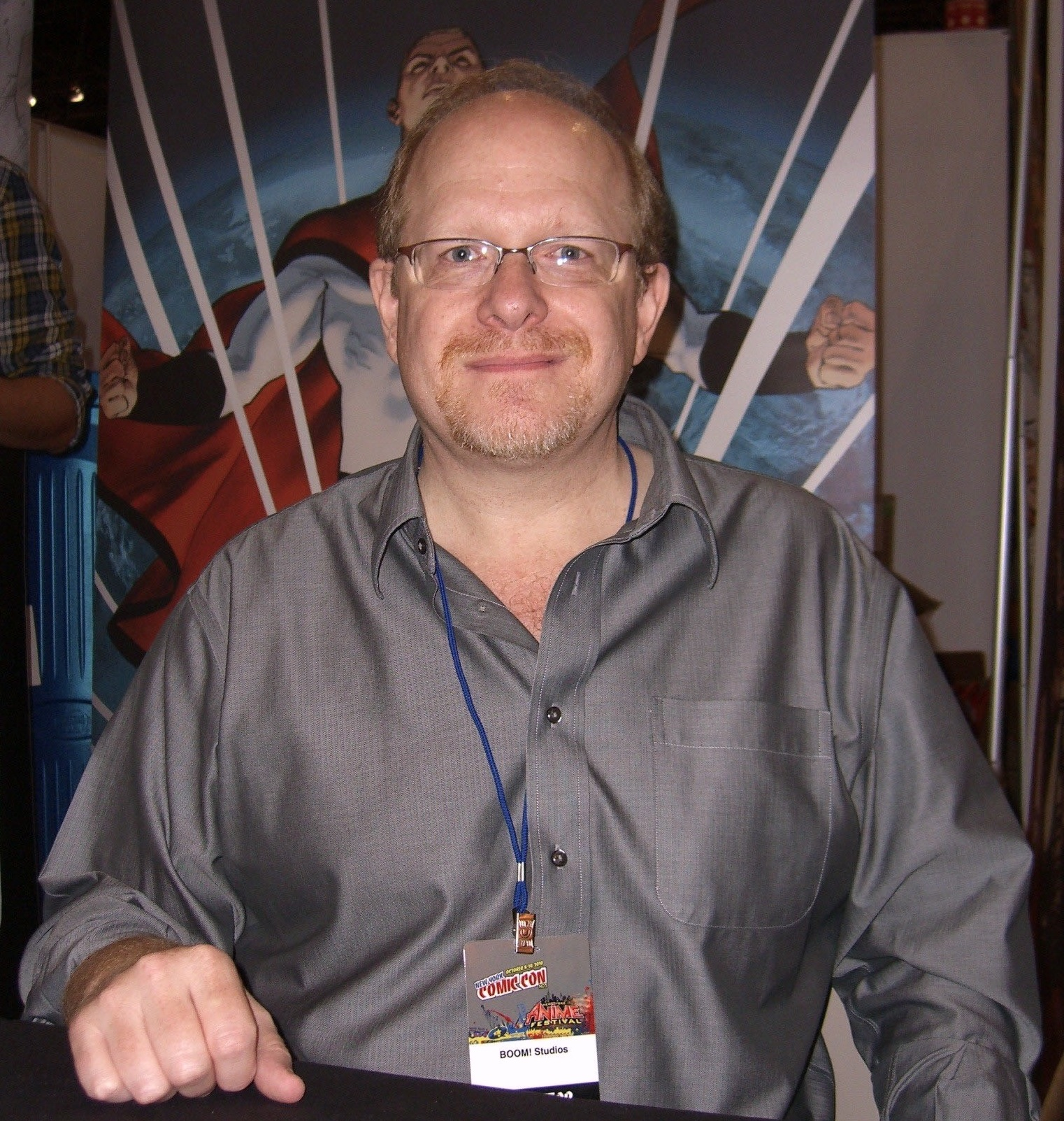
Mark Waid in October 2010. Waid wrote all 30 issues of Incorruptible.

In the month since the former superhero, Plutonian, began his rampage across Earth, supervillain Max Damage has disappeared and is presumed dead. After his gang commit a robbery, Max suddenly reappears and subdues them for arrest. Max returns to his base and destroys all of the possessions and money he stole, and refuses to have sex with his underage lover, Jailbait. Max tells Lieutenant Louis Armadale that he wants to go straight and asks for his help. Max first goes after Origin, a supervillain offering to empower ordinary humans in exchange for money. Origin requires money to buy a teleporter from the villain Amberjack to escape Earth. Later, Max tells Armadale about why he decided to become a hero. On the day that Plutonian began his attack, Max was about to unleash a deadly plague that would kill billions, out of anger against ordinary people who possess the ability to taste, smell and feel - sensations his powers prevent. However, before he could release the plague, Plutonian attacked, killing millions. Max realized that without the Plutonian, the world needed a new hero. In the present, Max goes after Amberjack. Amberjack uses his giant robot to attack Max. Max throws Amberjack's teleporter at Jailbait who knocks it towards the robot, sending it away. Jailbait realizes that Max intended to send her away and leaves, disregarding Max's protestations that he wanted to send her somewhere safe.

=== Volume 2 (#5–8) ===
Max rescues a young girl named Annie from her kidnappers. He forces her to wear Jailbait's costume and accompany him on patrol, eventually revealing he is using her to convince his enemies that Jailbait is still with him, fearing that otherwise she will become a target. The ruse fails and Armadale gives Max a box containing Jailbait's finger, sent by the villain Deathgiver. Max confronts Deathgiver and distracts him while Armadale frees Jailbait. Max fights with Deathgiver and his henchmen while Armadale tries to stop a distraught Jailbait from leaping to her death. Armadale fails but Max manages to catch her in time, though she suffers injuries. Meanwhile, Annie returns home to find her family murdered by the racist Diamond gang. Max and Armadale take Jailbait to hospital. Annie, there with her family, recognizes Armadale and realizes that the young girl is Jailbait. She steals Jailbait's costume and flees. Max confronts members of the Diamond gang who reveal they have been told his secrets by someone who survived Plutonian's destruction of Sky City. Max falls asleep in the hospital and when he awakens, he is shot by a Diamond gang-member, his powers revealed to reset when he sleeps, rendering him temporarily mortal. Annie, dressed as Jailbait, takes out Max's assassin. She makes Max promise to protect her forever before injecting him with adrenalin to keep him alive long enough for his powers to activate and heal his injuries. After attacking the Diamond gang members that sent Max's assassin, Max and Annie discover that they knew his vulnerability through a manuscript written by Alana Patel, the Plutonian's former girlfriend.

=== Volume 3 (#9–12) ===
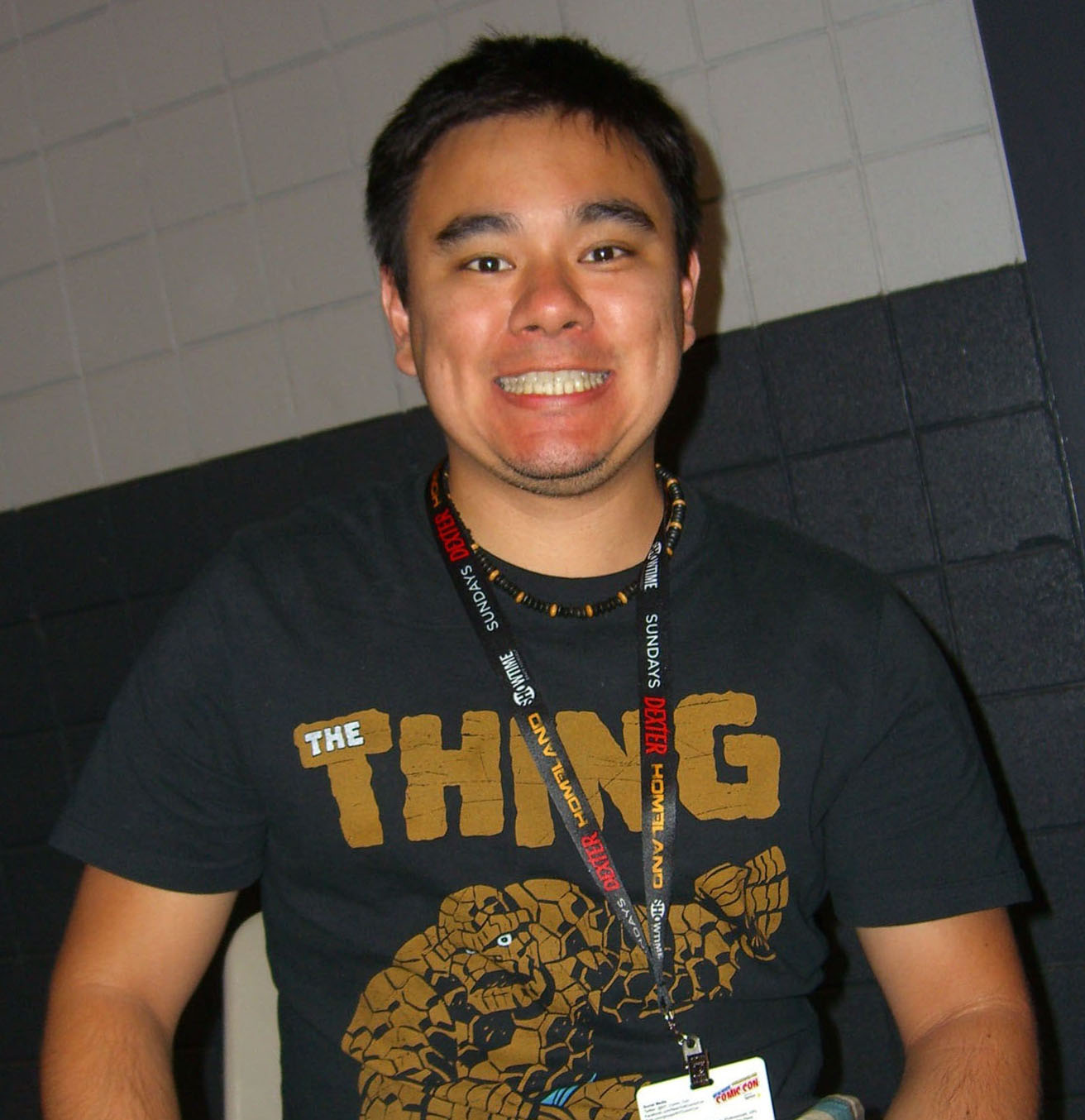
Marcio Takara in October 2010. Takara was the longest serving artists on the series, providing art for 16 issues in total beginning with Irredeemable #11.

Max and Annie travel to Alana's apartment, but find only Diamond gang members who tell them that Alana is at their skyscraper. Max sees Alana bound at the top of the building and climbs up to her while Annie sneaks in from the ground floor against Max's wishes. Max finds that the "Alana" on the building is a mannequin, while Annie is attacked by the real Alana. Annie convinces Alana she is not the real Jailbait, who had tortured her in the past, and ends up getting drunk with her. Max attacks the Diamond gang, led by Senator Swain, who have sent a massive assault vehicle named "Retribution" to destroy Coalville, Max's home city. While travelling to face "Retribution", Alana reveals that she blames herself for Plutonian's rampage after outing his secret civilian identity, Dan Hartigan. Max tells her that it is not her fault and asks her to help him do good. Meanwhile, Swain goes on television and accuses Max of leading the Diamond gang and sending out Retribution, asking everyone to work together to kill him. Alana informs the news that Swain leads the Diamond gang, causing Swain's boss, Hayes Bellamy, to detonate an explosive in Swain's building, killing Swain and his followers. Max meanwhile faces Retribution, managing to lift it. The vehicle activates legs to walk, but they are less protected than the body and Max is able to break them. Retribution's operators threaten to activate a nuclear device, but Armadale uses confiscated supervillain weapons to breach the vehicle's armor and the drivers are arrested. Alana and Max agree to work together.

=== Volume 4 (#13–16) ===
Alana confides her current situation in Hayes Bellamy, unaware of his involvement with the Diamond gang. Max has been working on a plan to stop Plutonian, forgoing sleep for days and becoming erratic. Annie sneaks away and fights the villain Arsonol, defeating him but really attempting to get herself killed. Max arrives and goes with her to visit her family's graves where she reveals a gravestone in her own name, declaring her old life dead. Max reveals his plan to stop Plutonian, which Armadale and Alana agree will work and will gain Max his redemption. Before he can enact it however, the Vespan, an alien race, telepathically announces to the world that they have captured the Plutonian and he is no longer a threat. In the wake of Plutonian's defeat, the world celebrates. Max chases after and captures Joe Bonn, a pickpocket, but he is confronted by the Paradigm, a group of surviving superheroes, who want to arrest him. After a brief fight, the Paradigm offers Max a membership to help rebuild the world. Max chooses to refuse unless they can repair Coalville first. They agree to create a machine to purify the local water for drinking. Annie arrives, but is accused of being a poser by Paradigm member Qubit and Max tells her that they cannot be partners, causing her to run away. After meeting up with Armadale, Annie incapacitates him and steals the powerful gun he had previously used against Retribution. Meanwhile, Hayes reveals his plan to distract the poor and hungry from his life of wealth and luxury by creating incidents such as the Diamond gang and now he intends to use Max. Max and the Paradigm successfully create the water purification device, but Annie returns and shoots Qubit, killing him. Max tells Annie that he is taking her in for murder. Qubit's ally Kaidan summons a water deity to revive him and they finish building the water purifier. When it is activated, the water turns to blood. After tasting it, Max recognizes it as goat blood, part of a spell by Nebuchadnezzar Grass and his mother Loretta, sorcerers hired by Hayes to cause disruption. Max defeats the pair. Annie is imprisoned for murder.

=== Volume 5 (#17–20) ===
After their home is attacked by civilians, Alana takes Max to meet Hayes and hear his proposal. Hayes offers Max a base, weapons and funding for his cause, but Max refuses, believing the funding should be spent helping those in need. After leaving Hayes, Max is attacked by the villains Tumult, Safeword and Charlie Hustle. When Max begins to win, Safeword uses her power to force Max to stop, and they flee. When Max recovers, Bellamy agrees to fund the repair of the city if Max can bring him one honest man to run it. Alana accepts for Max. Max later wonders if Bellamy knows why the villains did not finish him while he was incapacitated. Max recruits Armadale to help him find Mike Whelan, a former federal prosecutor to become the city manager. Meanwhile, Charlie, Safeword and Tumult are revealed to be working for Hayes. They are attending a gathering of several supervillains planning to cause chaos. Alana, having discovered a secret about Hayes, is subdued with gas. Max finds Mike, but he refuses to help, revealing that Max killed his son. The supervillains begin causing death and destruction around Coalville. Max holds Mike hostage while he attempts to convince Mike to take the job. Alana is captured by the villains who attempt to sexually assault her. Safeword uses her power to make them all stop and frees Alana, having been a fan of her since she was a child. While Max is still attempting to convince Mike, Charlie Hustle attacks him, ripping out Mike's heart. Charlie then uses a gas-bomb on Max to make him fall asleep, using knowledge unintentionally provided by Alana. Max is taken to Hayes, who takes advantage of Max's power reset to repeatedly shoot him, put him to sleep and then start again. Armadale, having been sober for years, falls back on alcohol after learning that Max killed Mike's child. Hayes continues to torture Max, claiming he will use him to cause destruction to continue his own plans. Jailbait suddenly attacks, killing Hayes and his men before freeing Max. Jailbait then leaves.

=== Volume 6 (#21–24) ===
Max begins building an unknown structure. Armadale tells Max that whatever happened before the Plutonian's rampage does not matter if they are to survive, commending Max for not sliding back into old habits as Armadale did with alcohol. A gathering of villains contemplate what to do, bored of their unchallenged crimes. The villain St. Lucifer appears over Coalville in his ship and captures the villainous gang. Armadale attempts to gather his police force, only to find they have all abandoned their jobs. Max ignores Lucifer's ship and continues to build. Lucifer offers the villains, including Jailbait, the opportunity to serve him when he conquers Coalville, the last city with any type of infrastructure. Max finds and incarcerates Charlie in the building he has created; a jail. St. Lucifer sends his minions to kill Max, hoping to present his head to the Plutonian as a peace offering, but before he can act, Plutonian arrives and attacks Max, demanding to know Alana's location. Max proves a match for Plutonian as their battle is broadcast on the news. Plutonian demands to know where Alana is, unable to hear or see her, but Max claims that she is smart enough to hide from Plutonian. Max thanks Plutonian for inspiring him to become a better person, and then requests that Plutonian leave Coalville. Max says something to the Plutonian which causes him to agree to the request and leave. The news covers Max's victory as Coalville cheers him. With Coalville now considered the only safe place thanks to Max, the combined U.S./Chinese forces move in to turn the city into a high-security, military complex, and enlist Max to their cause. St. Lucifer's villain gang attacks the nuclear plant to seize control of Coalville's power. Max decides that the only way to get what he wants - the freedom to protect Coalville independently in his own way - is to ally with Lucifer and evict the military.

=== Volume 7 (#25–30) ===
In a flashback to Max's childhood twenty-two years earlier, Max is a son to a wealthy, but uncaring family. He is very close to his younger neighbor Katy. Max attempts to capture the Wolf Boy, a child said to live in the woods. When Max springs his trap, the child is revealed to be a young Plutonian who cripples Max. Max recuperates and then runs away from home, but he stays in contact with Katy. He embarks on a life of crime, is disowned by his family, and ultimately stops writing to Katy out of shame at his life. During a robbery, Max is captured by the now-public superhero Plutonian, who recognizes Max as the child who attempted to trap him and crushes his hands out of anger. While Max heals, he rationalizes that in a post-Plutonian world, he must gain power. Max contacts Origin and is given his superhuman abilities. Max sets out to prove that Plutonian is hiding his true self—the brutal Wolf Boy—but consistently fails to beat him because of the lack of sleep required to give him enough strength to compete. Elsewhere Katy watches the beginning of Plutonian's rampage in Sky City as she reads Max's last letter. In the present, Max teleports away with Qubit. Armadale investigates a murder case. Armadale observes the city, finding that the citizens are working to restore their previous way of life and that order is being maintained by Hate Crime, St. Lucifer, and Max. Armadale reveals that the murder case is his own, and his investigation shows that the city can survive without him. Armadale shoots himself. Lucifer blames Armadale's death on Bill Henrie, a man with evidence that a lethal radioactive cloud is approaching Coalville, to prevent the information becoming publicly known. After learning the truth, Max coerces Bill into revealing the evidence on television, believing that it will bring people together. Instead the citizens descend into criminal activity. Max takes Bill back to his prison for safety, but it is suddenly attacked by a superpowered Alana. Max and Alana fight while the citizens of Coalville break into Max's prison, believing it to be a shelter from the lethal radiation cloud. Alana convinces Max that he failed to be the leader the citizens of Coalville needed, and she blames herself for not giving him the guidance he required. After returning to his prison and seeing it in flames, Max states that there is no more hope as the Plutonian has destroyed the world, but that he will not give up. Lucifer is killed by the villain Dr. Cobra after seeking out his weather machine. Max realizes that his no tolerance style of crime fighting has caused problems and kept people at a distance, and decides to change. He seizes control of Lucifer's gang and prepares to deal with the impending radiation, but it is completely removed by the Plutonian (in Irredeemable #36). With Coalville safe, Max decides to not carry all of the responsibility alone and grows closer to the citizens of the city, finally sharing his thoughts and stories with them. He refuses to reunite with Jailbait while she is under age, but reveals he is counting the days until her eighteenth birthday. He tells Jailbait that he will no longer stand up against things, but stand up for them.

== Characters ==
=== Central ===
Max Damage
A former supervillain turned superhero. As a villain, Max is bitter against normal humans because his powers take away his sensations. As Max prepared to unleash a deadly plague that would kill billions, he was interrupted by the start of Plutonian's rampage. Witnessing this event inspires Max to become a hero he believes the world needs. Max possesses varying degrees of superhuman strength and invulnerability, with their effectiveness increasing the longer he remains awake. Sleeping resets Max's power to normal human levels as his metabolism slows, but within an hour of waking his skin becomes virtually indestructible and his strength begins to increase, but as a result he loses any sensation of touch, smell and taste. Following training, Max is capable of staying awake for days or even weeks without sleep, but still suffers the effects of sleep deprivation, reducing his ability to think coherently or concentrate, and causing him to suffer hallucinations. The limit of Max's power is undefined, but it can grow to at least allow him to fight Plutonian as an equal. However, attaining this level of power requires Max to stay awake for weeks. Max is given his powers as a result of being submerged in an unknown liquid, dubbed the "chem-bath", as part of a scientific procedure conducted by the supervillain scientist Origin; Max is Origin's only successful patient. Some specially made gases can instantly render Max unconscious, resetting his powers and making him vulnerable. Max does not understand how to be a hero, and so does the opposite of what he did as a supervillain. This causes him to enforce a strict moral code, including never lying.
The 2011 story arc, "Redemption", details Max's childhood before receiving his powers, revealing his real name is Evan Cousins and he is the son of a wealthy, but distant family. Max attempts to capture the "Wolf Boy"-a supposed urban legend but in actuality a young Plutonian-which results in him being badly injured. After healing, Max leaves home to get away from his parents and embarks on a life of crime. Max is close to his neighbor Katy, each treating the other as a sibling, but he stops contacting her as is ashamed of her knowing about his criminal acts. The intervention of, then-public superhero, Plutonian in one of his crimes inspires Max to pursue power and no longer be a victim. After purchasing a super power treatment from Origin, he renames himself Max Damage and makes it his mission to expose what he believes is Plutonian's true nature as the brutal and feral "Wolf Boy".
Louis Armadale
A lieutenant in the Coalville Police department and a recovered alcoholic. He agrees to help Max on his road to redemption but keeps the arrangement secret from the rest of the police. Though reluctant to work with Max due to his criminal past, Armadale comes to consider Max his friend. He relapses into alcohol after he discovers that Max, while still a supervillain, had murdered Mike Whelan's son. After St. Lucifer is put in charge of Coalville, Armadale is promoted to police commissioner. He remains an alcoholic, ignoring some crimes and acting as an informant for St. Lucifer. After ensuring that the citizens of Coalville will work together to keep the city running, Hate Crime can substitute for Max, and that St. Lucifer will keep vital services in order, he determines it is morally justifiable to commit suicide and shoots himself.
Alana Patel
A radio engineer and the Plutonian's former girlfriend. She gains fame because of her relationship with Plutonian, but when he reveals his secret identity as her coworker Dan Hartigan, Alana outs the truth out of anger at his deception. As Plutonian's girlfriend, she was frequently kidnapped and tortured by Max. After Plutonian's fall, she is captured by the Diamond Gang to use as an offering for Plutonian, but she escapes with Max and Headcase. Alana works with Max in his efforts to rebuild Coalville, but wary of his instability from lack of sleep, unwittingly provides information about his weaknesses to his enemies. Max ends their partnership after he realizes she is the source of the information. Waid stated that Alana is looking for redemption through Max for her role in Plutonian's fall. Alana uses the resources abandoned by Max to help the villain Safeword reform and start her career as the hero Hate Crime. After being accused of needing to "sidekick" because of her relationship to Plutonian and Max, she goes into hiding. Alana returns in Issue #28, empowered with the same abilities as Max after undergoing the same "chem-bath" procedure that gave him his powers.
Jailbait/Terri
Jailbait is Max's sidekick and underage girlfriend. After Max reforms, he refuses to continue his illegal relationship with her. Jailbait refuses to give up her criminal lifestyle, clashing with Max's new ideology. She is captured by the villain Deathgiver, who removes one of her fingers. Believing Max no longer wants her, she attempts suicide but is saved by Max. In Issue 7, she willingly leaves Max, realizing they can no longer be together. Jailbait returns in Issue 20, saving Max following his capture and torture by Hayes. She tells Max that he saved her. Following the return of St. Lucifer, she joins his new gang of villains, and begins an affair with him. She also has affairs with other men.

=== Recurring ===
Charlie Hustle
A short supervillain who possesses superhuman speed. He wears a football outfit including helmet. Hustle initially works as a henchman for Bellamy. When Max tries to recruit Mike Whelan to run Coalville, Charlie rips out Mike's heart, and uses a special gas to render Max unconscious, allowing him to be captured by Bellamy. Charlie is eventually captured by Max and incarcerated in his super jail. In jail, his legs are kept broken to prevent him from using his powers. After Max's prison is destroyed, Max kicks him, sending him soaring off into the distance.
Hayes Bellamy
A billionaire businessman who uses crime and destruction to distract the general populace from noticing his wealth and luxury life in the Plutonian-ravaged Coalville. After he discovers Max's weakness and has him kidnapped and tortured, Bellamy's compound is assaulted by Jailbait and he is killed.
Headcase/Annie
The second person to be called Jailbait, taking on the role initially against her will. She willingly becomes the new Jailbait after the Diamond gang brutally kill her family. Max renames her Headcase, disliking her use of the Jailbait name, and she begins wearing a red version of Jailbait's costume. After the loss of her family, she states that "Annie" is dead, referring to herself only as Headcase. Headcase engages herself in dangerous situations attempting to get herself killed. Annie kills Paradigm member Qubit, fearing he will convince Max to abandon her, and Max arrests her for murder. Qubit is magically revived and Max instead tries to have Annie committed for psychiatric help, but with no hospitals remaining, he is forced to have Armadale imprison her.
Safeword/Hate Crime
An African-American, female supervillain, who possesses the magical ability to make people stop whatever actions they are doing by saying "Stop", leaving them temporarily immobilized, stunned or confused. Safeword initially works for Bellamy with Hustle and Tumult, but after witnessing the other supervillains slaughter civilians without anyone able to stop them, she decides to distance herself from them. When they prepare to sexually assault their hostage, Alana Patel, Safeword immobilizes the villains and escapes with Alana. Safeword decides to become a crimefighter, renaming herself Hate Crime, because "I hate crime". In July 2011, Waid stated that Hate Crime would become Max's third sidekick, after Jailbait and Headcase.
St. Lucifer
An international, powerful, aristocratic supervillain who inspires terror in the lower-tier supervillains. Possesses a genius intellect and is capable of creating advanced technology. After witnessing Max's victory over Plutonian, Lucifer abandons his plan to kill Max and accepts his offer to share Coalville, with Lucifer running the city's infrastructure for Max. St. Lucifer is killed off-panel by the villain Dr. Cobra.

== Reception ==
Doug Zawisa of Comic Book Resources positively received the first issue of Incorruptible, awarding it 3.5 out of 5 stars. Zawisa compared it favorably to Irredeemable, labeling it "engaging" and praising Waid for making the characters "not only interesting, but compelling". Diaz's art also received positive mention as "solid, detailed, and rugged." Miguel Perez of IGN awarded the issue a "Good" score of 7.5 out of 10, claiming Incorruptible's " long road to redemption to be more interesting than that of Irredeemable." Perez was however critical of the art, stating "there were at least three occasions where Max's face looked completely different. In fact, the only way I could tell for sure that it was the same character was the white streak in his hair and the leather jacket." Perez also criticized Max's design as "generic bad ass." Comics Bulletin offered a mixed response providing a mean score of 2.8 out of 5 based on three reviewers: Jason Sacks, Chris Kiser, and Danny Djeljosevic. Sacks and Kiser appreciated the concept with Sacks offering calling it a perfect companion to Irredeemable. Djeljosevic however, claimed the plot lacked "nuance" and surprise. Sacks and Djeljosevic were critical of Diaz's art as "inconsistent" and Max's design. Countering, Kiser appreciated the art as a "simple, iconic superhero art style."

Incorruptible Volume 3 was well received by Comics Bulletin critic Mike Prezatto, who appreciated the intricate, gradual changes of Max into a better, more heroic persona as "relatable". Prezatto offered mixed praise of the art, calling it inconsistent, citing repeated change in creative teams behind the series. Prezatto preferred Takara's "bold style" to Domingues' work and felt that the series "would step up a notch in quality" if Takara became a long-term artist. Prezatto awarded the volume 3.5 out of 5.

Dave Powell of Comics Bulletin awarded Incorruptible Volume 4 a score of 3.5 out of 5, praising Waid for mixing "the psychological drama seamlessly with action and plot." Powell offered some criticism of Takara's art, stating "while Marcio Takara's art works very well in this trade, sometimes it wears thin for me. The characters are a little stiff at times...some of you will LOVE the art. Some of you will call me an idiot for feeling there's a tiny bit missing in it." However, Powell "enjoyed" the color work of Nolan Woodard, saying "when the action hits, color explodes off the page." Summarizing, Powell called the volume "a solid, exciting, and visually pleasing Trade Paperback."

== Film adaptation ==
On March 17, 2022, it was announced that Netflix will be adapting the comic book into a feature film, combining both Irredeemable and Incorruptible. Jeymes Samuel is set to direct from a screenplay by Kemp Powers. Jay-Z will produce the film.

== Collected editions ==
Title	Material collected	Release date	ISBN
Incorruptible Vol. 1	Incorruptible #1–4	June 1, 2010	1-60886-015-9
Incorruptible Vol. 2	Incorruptible #5–8	October 12, 2010	1-60886-028-0
Incorruptible Vol. 3	Incorruptible #9–12	February 1, 2011	1-60886-039-6
Incorruptible Vol. 4	Incorruptible #13–16	July 5, 2011	1-60886-056-6
Incorruptible Vol. 5	Incorruptible #17–20	November 1, 2011	1-60886-057-4
Incorruptible Vol. 6	Incorruptible #21–24	May 1, 2012	1-60886-084-1
Incorruptible Vol. 7	Incorruptible #27–30	August 7, 2012	1-60886-085-X
Incorruptible Omnibus	Incorruptible #1-30 and Irredeemable #32-33	October 29, 2020	978-1684156092

Prior to the release of the Omnibus, issues #25–26 were only collected in the Irredeemable Volume 9 trade paperback.
