= Steven Cummings =

American comic book artist

- Areas: Penciller, Inker
- Notable works: Pantheon High; CSI: Intern at Your Own Risk

Steven Cummings is an American comic book artist.

== Biography ==
Presented his first professional work by DC Comics editor Bob Schreck, Steven Cummings penciled an unpublished inventory issue of Green Lantern featuring John Stewart. This work opened the doorway for Gene Pool (a graphic novella written by Marv Wolfman and Len Wein through IDW Publishing).

Since then Cummings has worked for Marvel Comics on Elektra and New Excalibur. He has also worked with DC Comics editor Joey Cavalieri on Flash (written by Geoff Johns and featuring the Mirror Master), the Deadshot mini-series and Batman: Legends of the Dark Knight (on which he did both the pencils and the inks). Kenzer & Company, Arcana Studio, Th3rdWorld Studios and Devil's Due Publishing have also contracted him to do covers for their books.

Beyond the U.S. direct market, Steven Cummings had a graphic album published in Europe by Les Humanoïdes Associés. As well, Cummings, along with writer Paul Benjamin, has developed a manga, Pantheon High, for TokyoPop. Pantheon High marks the debut of his wife, Megumi Cummings, as his inker. This book also features Cummings' first printed zip-a-tone work as well as hand-colored cover.

He drew the manga CSI: Intern at Your Own Risk for Tokyopop written by Sekou Hamilton. Like all his manga work, CSI is also created with the help of his wife Megumi. He has also worked on art for Canada's Udon Entertainment.

Steven Cummings also shares a forum at PaperFilms' Forum (a site run by Jimmy Palmiotti, Amanda Conner and Justin Gray).

== Bibliography ==
Cover to Pantheon High Volume 01 illustrated by Steven Cummings and written by Paul Benjamin

=== Comics ===
- Green Lantern (inventory issue, DC Comics, 2002)
- MORE FUND COMICS (graphic novel/anthology – Kamen short story, Sky-Dog Press, September 2003)
- Gene Pool (with Marv Wolfman and Len Wein, graphic novella, IDW Publishing, October 2003, ISBN 1-932382-12-7)
- Elektra #32-34 (Marvel Comics, January to March 2004)
- The Darkness Vol. 2, #9 (Top Cow Productions, May 2004)
- The Flash #212 (with Geoff Johns, DC Comics, July 2004)
- Deadshot (with Christos Gage, 5-issue mini-series, DC Comics, December 2004 to April 2005)
- New Excalibur #4-5 (Marvel Comics, February to March 2006)
- Batman: Legends of the Dark Knight #204-206, #213 (DC Comics, April to May, December 2006)
- Pantheon High Manga (TokyoPop, February 2007)
- Star Trek: The Manga #2: To Boldly Go (果敢に進行, Kakan ni Shinkou) (TokyoPop, September 2007)
- CSI: Intern at Your Own Risk (with Sekou Hamilton, Tokyopop, September 2009)
- Wayward (ongoing series, Image Comics, August 2014-October 2018)

=== Covers ===
- Gene Pool (IDW Publishing, October 2003)
- Knights of the Dinner Table #104 (Kenzer & Company, June 2005)
- Starkweather Graphic Novel (Arcana Studio, August 2005)
- Paradox #1 (Arcana Studio, November 2005)
- Dead Men Tell No Tales #3 (Arcana Studio, November 2005)
- G.I. Joe Vs Transformers: The Art of War #5 (Devil’s Due Publishing, July 2006)
- Pantheon High Manga (TokyoPop, February 2007)
- Omega Chase #1-2 (Th3rdWorld Studios, 2007)
