= Irredeemable =

Comic book series

- Irredeemable #1 (April 2009). Cover art by John Cassaday and colors by Laura Martin.

Publication information
- Publisher: Boom! Studios
- Schedule: Monthly
- Genre: Superhero
- Publication date: April 2009 – May 2012
- No. of issues: 37
- Main character(s): Plutonian; Qubit; Bette Noir; Survivor; Gilgamos; Volt; Kaidan; Modeus

Creative team
- Written by: Mark Waid
- Artist(s): Peter Krause (24 issues); Diego Barreto (20 issues); Eduardo Barreto (1 issue)
- Letterer: Ed Dukeshire
- Colorist: Andrew Dalhouse
- Editor: Matt Gagnon

Irredeemable is an American comic book series written by Mark Waid, drawn by Peter Krause and Diego Barreto, and published by Boom! Studios. The series follows the fall of the world's greatest superhero, the Plutonian, as he begins slaughtering the population of Earth. His former allies, the superhero group The Paradigm, attempt to find a way to stop his rampage while dealing with their own feelings of betrayal and hopelessness. Irredeemable #1 premiered in April 2009, and the series ended in May 2012, after thirty-seven issues and one special. Peter Krause was the artist for the first twenty-four issues, after which Diego Barretto took over as artist. A spin-off, Incorruptible, was released in December 2009, which follows one of the Plutonian's greatest enemies, Max Damage, on his journey to become a superhero in the wake of Plutonian's fall. Waid brought both series to a conclusion in May 2012.

== Publication history ==
Initial pre-publication publicity utilized the tagline "Mark Waid is Evil! Mark Waid is Irredeemable!", which culminated with the release of a limited edition "Mark Waid is Evil" tee-shirt at the 2009 New York Comic Con. On February 23, 2009, Boom! Studios released a trailer, by Craig Kennedy at CK Creative, for the series on YouTube and posted the first 7 pages of the first issue on the company website.

The first issue, which included an afterword by Grant Morrison, featured a cover by John Cassaday, a 1-in-4 variant cover by Barry Kitson, and a 1-in-50 incentive cover signed by Mark Waid with artwork by Jeffrey Spokes. The incentive variants by Spokes for the first 12 issues of the series spelled out "Irredeemable", with one letter being featured on each cover. A silver holofoil edition, limited to 500 copies with a cover stating "Mark Waid is Evil", was released at the 2009 Emerald City Convention. The first issue sold out of Diamond Comics Distribution on the day of release, which caused the publisher to immediately solicit a second printing of the comic. The second printing's cover is a sketch version of Kitson variant and a 1-in-20 incentive reprinting of the Spokes cover, not signed by Waid.

In April 2011, Krause announced that he would be leaving the series to focus on opportunities outside of comics. Krause claimed that he made the decision in February 2011 after finding himself facing stress and deadlines from multiple commitments. These commitments resulted in art duties for multiple issues of the series being shared between Krause, who drew pages involving the Plutonian, and Diego Barreto, who drew pages relating to the Paradigm. Starting with Irredeemable #29 in September 2011, Krause officially left the series, being replaced by Diego and his father Eduardo Barreto.

On February 3, 2012, Waid announced that he was bringing both Irredeemable and Incorruptible to an end with issues #37 and #30 respectively in May 2012. Waid stated that he was "stretched thin right now both personally and professionally", and that the cast of Irredeemable were moving naturally towards the series ending he had planned, and so Waid desired to "go out big and grand". Waid did not rule out revisiting the Irredeemable series in the future to explore some of the characters but intimated that this would not be possible for some of them, following the series' end.

== Creation and development ==
"What if you go from, you know, Captain America to Doctor Doom? What if you go from Superman to Lex Luthor? How do you go from being the greatest hero in the world—someone that everybody knows, and everybody loves, and everyone recognizes—to the greatest villain in the world? What is that path? It's not a light switch, it's not an on-off switch, it's not something that you wake up one day and just become evil."

— Mark Waid on the basis for Irredeemable

Irredeemable is author Mark Waid's third and "most complex" story concerning the "cost of superheroics" or the "path of villainy". Kingdom Come concerned the "ethical price of heroism" and Empire premised the ultimate failure of superheroes, but Irredeemable is "about how the lessons we learn about right and wrong as children can become warped and twisted when challenged by the realities of the adult world." Waid realized that the concept was one he could never properly explore at either DC or Marvel Comics, a "Twilight of the Superheroes"-style story revolving around the premise of "how does a man go from being the world’s greatest superhero to its greatest supervillain?"

Waid's premise stems from the rejection of the idea that, in "superhero comics, pretty much everyone who’s called upon to put on a cape is, at heart, emotionally equipped for the job." He expounds of this by stating that:

The beauty of Superman is that he can deal with that level of adulation without it going to his head, without it warping him, but he's a very special individual. We presume, whenever we write superheroes and we come up with superhero origins, that anybody who gets the powers of a superhero — even if they are like Spider-Man and they've got things they've got to work out that issue and responsibility and power and responsibility — we assume that they eventually have the emotional makeup it takes to overcome these things. Well, what if you gave that level of power to someone who, at heart, didn't have that emotional capability?

Waid further notes that, "by the classic superhero rules," heroes can't concern themselves with what people think of them, but that if "you are so far removed as to not care what people think of you, it takes one less step to not care what people think."

During the 2011 San Diego Comic-Con, Waid stated that he had developed ideas for ending the story but had no end issue planned while sales of the book continued. During the same event, he added that he did not have any intention of rehabilitating the Plutonian character or redeeming him for his actions, saying "There's no hope for Plutonian...but that said, I never actually said the title Irredeemable refers to Plutonian."

== Plot summary ==
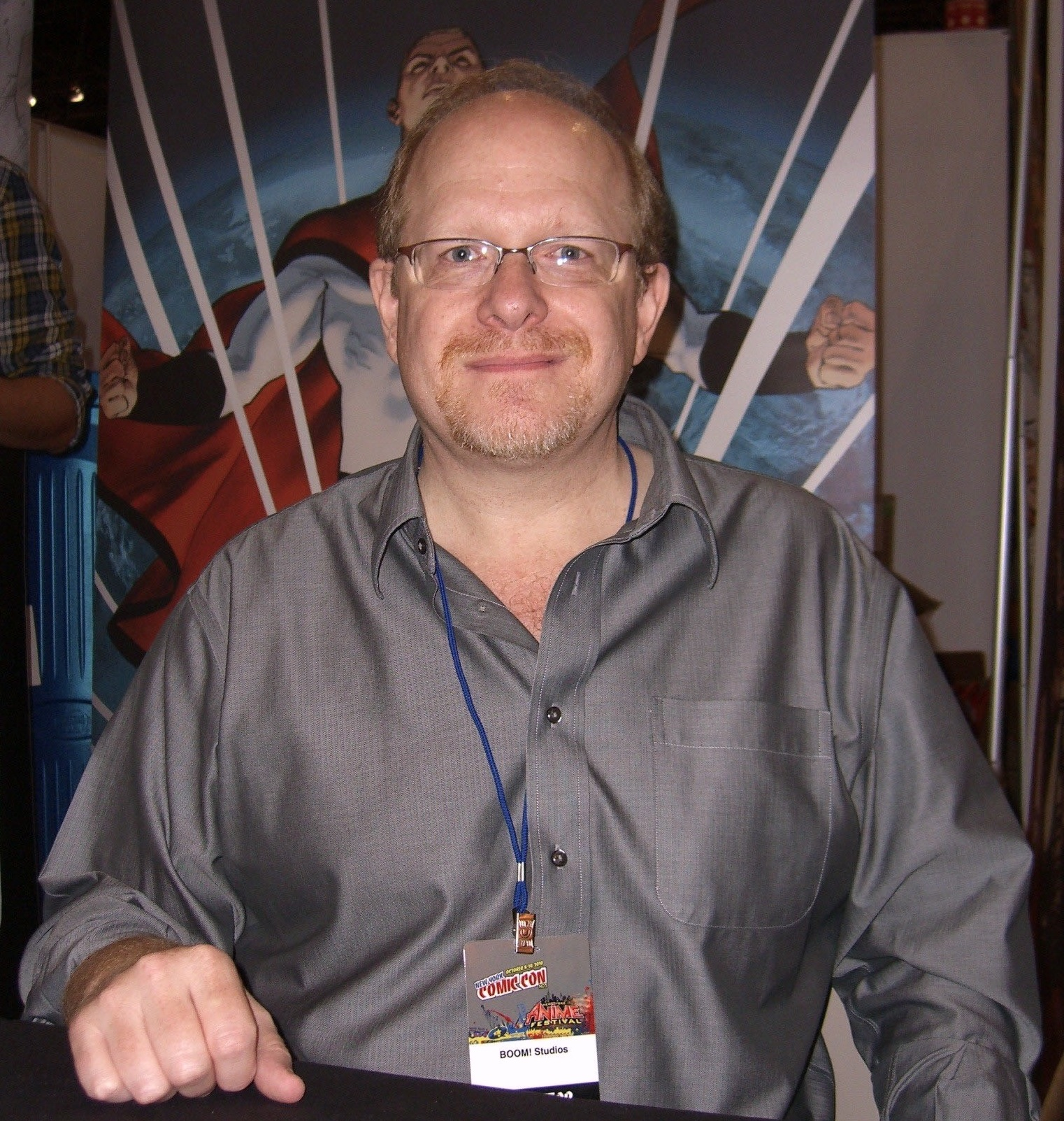
Mark Waid in October 2010. Waid wrote all 37 issues of Irredeemable.

=== Volume 1 (#1–4) ===
The Plutonian, a powerful being once thought to be the world's greatest superhero, has now become its greatest supervillain. He has destroyed Sky City—the metropolis he once protected—and murdered millions of people across the globe. The series starts with the Plutonian killing his former ally, the Hornet, and his entire family. The remaining superheroes, the Paradigm—Bette Noir, Scylla, Charybdis (Cary), Volt, Qubit, Gilgamos, and Kaidan—search for the reason behind Plutonian's change by speaking to his former sidekick Samsara, whom Plutonian lobotomized with his heat vision.

Former enemies of Plutonian attempt to work with him, but they immediately betray him when he offers a way to earn his trust, resulting in a self-destruct of the facility in which they are meeting. The resulting explosion kills Scylla and injures Cary, superhero brothers who are observing the villains.

The United Nations offer Plutonian their subservience, hoping to avoid his wrath. The Plutonian takes offense when, after speaking to the Singaporean representative, he realizes that the decision is made out of fear. In response, Plutonian sinks Singapore into the ocean. Meanwhile, Qubit searches for Modeus, the Plutonian's nemesis, using multiple robots designed to look and think like the villain.

=== Volume 2 (#5–8) ===
Qubit and the other heroes discover Modeus' location within Plutonian's citadel. Plutonian is alerted to the heroes' hidden location and attacks them. Cary waits to confront Plutonian while the others teleport into his lair. Cary reveals that he is aware that Plutonian, when he was still a hero, used alien technology recovered from an invasion to buy the silence of a scientist who was a vociferous Plutonian critic due to the latter's tight control of said technology. Plutonian thought the technology was safe and believed the scientist to be sincere in his criticism, but subsequent tampering released a virus that resulted in the deaths of many children. Plutonian tried to conceal his involvement in the event, but when Samsara learned the truth, Plutonian snapped, enraged that no matter what he attempts to do, people are terrified of him.

Plutonian attempts to kill Cary, but Cary reveals that his brother's death has made him significantly more powerful. The rest of the Paradigm returns, having failed to locate Modeus, but they have recovered Plutonian's captive Encanta. The group witness Cary beat Plutonian into submission. Plutonian flees and hides in Samsara's grave.

=== Volume 3 (#9–12) ===
Qubit teleports to his base with Encanta, believing she may know how to find Modeus. Encanta details how Modeus had her cast a spell that would put him in the "safest place on Earth". Samsara's restorative powers revive him in his grave to Plutonian's gratitude, but it is revealed that Modeus secretly possesses Samsara's body. Meanwhile, in response to Cary's new power, the US military summons the demon Orian to destroy the heroes entirely. Orian kidnaps Bette to use as bait and learns of her secret past by threatening her husband Gil's life. Bette reveals that she had an affair with Plutonian before his fall, using a magical candle that renders Plutonian mortal to allow them to have sex. Bette stole a piece of the candle wax, but she did not tell the other Paradigm members about it, fearing that her affair would be exposed. The Paradigm confront Orian, but even Cary is unable to compete with his power. The military captures the team, except for a fleeing Bette, and Cary, who is dragged away by Orian into his own dimension.

=== Volume 4 (#13–15) ===
Encanta is teleported from Qubit's lab by a rogue Modeus robot that is revealed to be in possession of Scylla, who is still alive. Cary and Orian return to Earth, agreeing to work together to kill Plutonian. Bette liberates Qubit, Kaidan, and Volt from prison, but she finds that Gil has already escaped. The group teleport to Bette's home to retrieve the wax fragment that she has crafted into a bullet, but Gil has already taken it. Cary, Orian, Gil, and Bette confront Plutonian. While they fight, Modeus/Samsara pushes Volt over a cliff to his death. Bette shoots at Plutonian with the wax bullet, but Qubit uses his portals to redirect the bullet and kill Orian, having correctly surmised that Orian intended to invade Earth after Plutonian's death. Plutonian and Samsara retreat, and the Paradigm shun Qubit for wasting the opportunity to stop Plutonian. It is revealed that Qubit retrieved the wax bullet after it killed Orian.

=== Volume 5 (#16–19) ===
At Volt's funeral, Kaidan discovers she can summon the spirits of her fallen comrades. For their alliance with Orian, Cary destroys the controls for the US nuclear arsenal, making them dependent on the Paradigm's power. Elsewhere, Modeus/Samsara offers Plutonian a chance to undo his actions. Kaidan realizes that Scylla is alive when she fails to summon his spirit. Modeus/Samsara and Plutonian travel to Sky City with a magical gem. Plutonian laments that only Modeus could figure out how to use the gem to restore Sky City, and he reminisces about the time he realized that Modeus was in love with him. Plutonian reveals that he is aware of Modeus' possession of Samsara and burns off Samsara's face. Qubit shows Kaidan and Cary a recording made by Hornet prior to his death, detailing a deal he made with the aliens the Vespan when they invaded Earth; the locations of habitable alien worlds in exchange for them leaving Earth alone, but returning to subdue the Plutonian if he ever turned evil. Hornet activated the signal to the Vespan before he was killed. The Vespan arrive and subdue Plutonian with advanced technology. The rogue Modeus robot and Encanta find the injured Modeus/Samsara and transfer Modeus into the robot's body. Plutonian is taken off world, kept passive in an artificial reality where he is still a hero.

=== Volume 6 (#20–23) ===
Cary takes credit for Plutonian's defeat and offers amnesty to supervillains that join the Paradigm to help rebuild the Earth. Plutonian is fitted with an exoskeleton to put his unconscious body to work mining on an alien world; the Vespan find they cannot awaken him from his fantasy. Qubit confronts Cary, accusing him of not searching for Scylla out of fear of losing his new power. Cary threatens to tell the world that Qubit spared Plutonian's life. Modeus plots to return Plutonian to Earth. In space, the Vespan realize that they cannot contain the Plutonian, and send him to Gehnom, an insane asylum in the heart of a sun.

On Earth, Cary uses the telepathic villain Burrows to interrogate the villains seeking amnesty to determine if their motives are pure. Qubit has Burrows secretly scan Cary and learns enough to deem him as big a threat as Plutonian. Modeus kidnaps Kaidan to force Qubit into an alliance to recover Plutonian. On Gehnom, Plutonian wakes from his fantasy to find the Auroran, a heroic figure from his dream, is present in the waking world.

=== Volume 7 (#24–27) ===
Qubit and Modeus travel to the Vespan homeworld and coerce Plutonian's location from the Vespan ambassador by threatening to disable the portal technology they employ that is based on Qubit's designs. On Gehnom, Plutonian and Auroran work together to escape the asylum, fighting their way through the inmates until they face Mordanse, a bestial alien. They negotiate an alliance with Mordanse to escape, and they are later joined by another alien, Kurne.

On Earth, Cary tricks Burrows into revealing that he has been reading Cary's mind, learning of his increasing instability and anger. On Gehnom, Plutonian's group are joined by the aliens Cutter and Mallus, the latter of whom can punch a person through time. Before they escape, Plutonian confronts Auroran about why he resembles the first person Plutonian ever saved. Auroran is unveiled as a shape-shifting symbiote feeding on Plutonian's dreams. Plutonian kills Auroran and travels with his group to the portal that will lead them from Gehnom. There, they find Qubit and Modeus waiting. Qubit remotely destroys all of his teleportation technology to prevent Plutonian's escape. Plutonian notices a blur and realizes that it is himself from the immediate future, sent back in time by Mallus' power. While Qubit believed he had teleported Plutonian's allies away, the future Plutonian had gathered his allies and traveled through the Gehnom portal to Earth. The present Plutonian fades away and Modeus' robot body falls apart, leaving Qubit and Mallus trapped on Gehnom.

=== Volume 8 (#28–31) ===
Witnessing Plutonian's return, the public turn against the Paradigm for promising Earth was safe. Plutonian's group assaults the new Paradigm, but stands aside as their villain recruits attack Cary for bringing them to Plutonian's attention. After peering into Plutonian's mind, Burrows hangs himself. Plutonian leaves, taking some of the villain recruits with him, whom he later kills. Chinese and Japanese representatives meet with the US President to reveal their plan to kill Plutonian, which will result in the death of two billion people. Plutonian locates Bette and brings her into his group.

Elsewhere, Kaidan escapes Modeus' imprisonment, summoning Scylla's spirit to fight his mindless body. Scylla's body is killed during the battle. Kaidan and Scylla's freed spirit find Gil and recruit him to locate Elliott, Scylla and Cary's triplet brother, to stop Cary. Cary meets with Elliott, who has become a priest and abandoned his powers. Bette repeatedly attempts suicide but is saved by the Plutonian. China, Japan, and the US launch their plan, releasing two towering creatures from a hidden facility, causing widespread destruction and billions of deaths. Scylla, Gil, and Kaidan find Elliott with Cary, and Gil kills Cary to transfer his power into Elliott, not knowing that Cary is the source of the power. Once Cary has died, the power is lost.

Cutter confronts Bette and is revealed to be possessed by Modeus. He takes possession of Bette and discards Cutter's body. Elsewhere, the two towering alien creatures confront Plutonian, claiming to be his parents.

=== Volume 9 (#32–33) ===
The creatures take Plutonian to the end of time and existence, intending to leave him there. Plutonian asks them to explain how he came to be. The creatures reveal themselves as the Eleos, a race of interdimensional beings that explore and record universes. During their mission to Earth years prior, they find humans to be interesting and sacrifice a part of themselves to create a probe to explore humanity. The probe is inadvertently transformed into an infant human in response to the strong emotions of a mother who had killed her child. He is later raised by Bill Hartigan, the only foster parent who is not afraid of Plutonian's powers and trains him to be a selfless superhero. After learning of his wife's inoperable cancer, Bill and his wife are killed in an accident that Plutonian believes was suicide.

Plutonian reveals that he hates his enemy Max Damage more than anyone because Max saw Plutonian as a child when he lived in the wilderness as the "wolf boy" and inspired his first act of unrestrained anger. The Eleos accept that Plutonian now feels remorse, but they abandon him at the end of time, refusing to absolve him of his crimes. Qubit and Max Damage teleport to Plutonian and return him to Earth.

=== Volume 10 (#34–37) ===
The final panel of Irredeemable from Issue #37, showing the essence of the Plutonian character inspiring the creation of the comic book superhero Superman by Jerry Siegel and Joe Shuster.

Qubit amplifies Mallus' powers to allow him to rapidly recreate his teleportation technology and escape Gehnom. Returning to find Earth devastated by radiation, and believing humanity will become extinct within three generations, Qubit recruits Max as muscle and seeks out Plutonian. When Qubit offers to make Plutonian even stronger in order to remove the radiation, Max abandons the plan and leaves.

Qubit's efforts to remove the radiation fail. During a conversation about how Modeus helped create the radiation as a child, Plutonian realizes that he has possessed Cutter and flies after Bette, believing Modeus will hurt her. Modeus/Bette sends Kurne after Gil and Kaidan, and captures Mordanse. Plutonian returns, but Modeus uses Bette's gravity manipulation to overpower Plutonian. Modeus uses his power to brutally beat Plutonian when his advances are rejected, but Plutonian finds himself unable to harm Bette's body. Gil leads Kaidan and Scylla to the Garden of Eden. Kaidan and Scylla debate planting the seeds of the Tree of Life, granting immortality to humanity and immunity from the radiation but condemning them to an eternity of torture by Plutonian and preventing Kaidan from summoning the dead. Qubit confronts Modeus/Bette and convinces Plutonian to kill her body, admitting the hypocrisy of his no-killing rule. Modeus transfers himself into Qubit but is left trapped by Qubit's mental safeguards. Qubit uses Modeus' memories to discover how to stop the radiation, and Plutonian retrieves the knowledge of Bette's powers, necessary to stop the radiation. Plutonian confronts Qubit about his promise of redemption after using his time-observing power to discover that Mallus was killed sending Qubit to Earth.

Qubit teleports the magic wax bullet into Plutonian's heart as a final threat, forcing Plutonian to use the last of Bette's gravity-warping energy to absorb the deadly radiation by racing around the planet as fast as possible. The plan succeeds, and the radiation is removed, but the combined energy was too much for the Plutonian, and it fatally ravages his body. Qubit reveals his true plan to redeem Plutonian: by using his portals to transport Plutonian's original essence, as created by the Eleos, into parallel universes to give it a chance to be remade into something good.

In one universe, the essence inspires two young boys, implied to be Jerry Siegel and Joe Shuster, to create the ultimate comic superhero, drawing a character similar in appearance to Superman.

== Characters ==
=== Central ===
The Plutonian
A Superman-like supervillain who was the world's first and formerly greatest superhero. His origin is initially unknown even to himself; he provides alternating stories such as being an alien or an orphaned mutant. Issue #32 details how the Plutonian came to be, created by members of an alien race sent to study Earth: the Eleos. Intrigued by the diversity and intensity of human emotions, the aliens crafted a probe using a piece of themselves, to study humans more closely. The probe is drawn to the powerful emotions of a mentally imbalanced woman seeking redemption after murdering her child. In response the probe is transformed into an infant human. The mother repeatedly fails to reenact her crime on the invulnerable infant and ultimately kills herself—the young Plutonian is placed into foster care. Given the name Dan Anderson, he is repeatedly moved through foster homes by parents fearful of him after discovering his abilities. Bill Hartigan, his final foster parent, accepts Dan's powers and trains him to be a selfless hero. Bill creates the superhero identity of Plutonian (named for Piety, Loyalty, Utility, Truthfulness, and Order) and the civilian identity of Dan Hartigan for him. Bill and his wife die in a car crash after Dan informs him of his wife's terminal cancer; Dan suspects that the accident was actually a suicide. Following Bill's death, Dan becomes the Plutonian, donning a costume bearing a symbol on his chest similar to the design embedded on the front door of one of his foster homes. After the Plutonian confesses to his girlfriend Alana Patel that he and Dan Hartigan are the same person, Alana reveals his secret out of anger that she has been fooled. He also engages in an affair with fellow superhero Bette Noir.

Unable to cope with criticism levied against him by various people including Dr. Seabrook—who criticizes him for withholding seized alien technology—Plutonian provides Seabrook with a sample of the technology. The technology proves fatal and unleashes a virus that kills hundreds of children before it is stopped. Plutonian attempts to conceal his involvement, but his mistake combined with his increasing resentment of humanity culminates when his sidekick Samsara is informed of Plutonian's involvement by Seabrook's colleagues. The Plutonian snaps, lobotomizes Samsara, and destroys his home of Sky City, killing 3.5 million people in thirty minutes. Plutonian maintains an obsession with Bette after their affair: crafting art in her image, dressing his captive sex-slave Encanta in her clothes, and forcing a couple to have sex; the man resembling Plutonian and the woman dressed like Bette.

The Plutonian's powers are not physical but psionic, enabling him to subconsciously manipulate matter on an atomic level: allowing him to heat or freeze the air, see through objects, fly, render himself virtually indestructible, possess super strength and heightened senses, and make opponents more susceptible to damage. Modeus hypothesizes that if the Plutonian is made aware of his true abilities he would be able to alter probability, see through time and reverse entropy, concluding "and that's just if he moves from kindergarten to grade school." After meeting with his Eleos creators, Plutonian's powers are expanded. He gains a sixth digit on each hand like the Eleos, and learns how to alter his density to become intangible, remotely ignite explosions by manipulating quantum matter, negate inertia to the point he can stop Earth's moon rotating, view an individual's history by using their mind as a focal point to see through time, and to detect raw materials within a planet and draw them to the surface by will.

==== The Paradigm ====
A group of superheroes and the Plutonian's former teammates. Established four years before the beginning of the series by the Plutonian, Bette Noir, Qubit, Charybdis, Scylla, Metalman, Hornet, and Kaidan. The surviving members work together to discover a means to stop the Plutonian's rampage.

Bette Noir
A female crime fighter who augments her uncanny aim with customized ammunition for dealing with specific threats. Her bullets are capable of blowing buildings apart. Married to Gilgamos, but has an affair with the Plutonian prior to his fall. As a result of the affair, Bette possesses candle wax capable of rendering the Plutonian a mortal man, used to allow them to consummate their relationship. She attempts to kill the Plutonian with a bullet crafted from the magic wax but fails due to Qubit's interference. Unable to deal with the guilt of allowing millions to die by not acting sooner, she goes into hiding. Bette is discovered by the Plutonian in Irredeemable #29, living a hedonistic lifestyle while awaiting death. Bette is later possessed by Modeus. In Issue #35, Modeus unlocks Bette's true potential, physics altering gravity singularities. Bette was unaware of her full abilities, using them only to enhance single bullets. By chemically altering Bette's frontal lobe, Modeus gains enough strength to manipulate gravity on a scale capable of overpowering the Plutonian's ability to fly or move. Modeus is able to use her power to open wormholes of limitless range, enabling him to consume entire star systems, granting Bette's body enough power to physically injure and overwhelm the Plutonian. According to Modeus, each blow capable of injuring Plutonian requires the death of a single star system. At Qubit's request, Bette's body is eventually destroyed by Plutonian.
Charybdis/Survivor/Cary
Twin and partner of Scylla. Cary possesses energy manipulation and projection powers, and he is the source of the power that Scylla employs. Following Scylla's apparent death, his share of their power is returned to Cary, who adopts the codename Survivor. With his restored strength, Cary is capable of equaling the Plutonian's power. Cary is jealous of his brother's relationship with Kaidan. Her rejection of Cary's own advances, combined with his increasing responsibilities leading the Paradigm, and power lead to him becoming unstable, causing Kaidan and Qubit to plot against him, fearing he is more dangerous than Plutonian. Issue #30 shows that Cary and Scylla were triplets with their brother Elliott. Cary shared his power equally among his brothers but cannot take it back until their death. Cary is killed by Gil in Issue #31 and all of his and Elliott's power is lost as a result.
Gilgamos/Gil
A two-thousand-year-old, winged warrior married to Bette Noir. Possesses superhuman strength and capable of unsupported flight. In the events surrounding the Paradigm's arrest, Gilgamos lost his wings. While the first was lost in combat against Orian, he tore the second off himself after being incarcerated by the US government, using the bones within to pick the lock of his cell. Following an unsuccessful attempt to kill the Plutonian and the revelation of his wife's infidelity, Gilgamos leaves the team and wanders the Earth alone. Gil returns in Issue #29 when Kaidan and Scylla's ghost bring him out of retirement.

Kaidan/Keiko
Of Japanese ancestry, the women of Kaidan's family can summon powerful spirits of folklore through verbal storytelling to fight on their behalf. Kaidan is initially limited to summoning the spirits of Japanese folklore, but while mourning Volt's death, she begins reminiscing about her lost comrades and unexpectedly summons their ghostly forms. Kaidan and fellow member Scylla are in love, to the chagrin of his brother Cary.

Qubit
Possesses a genius intellect and is capable of mentally rearranging component machinery to form whatever device he imagines, including teleportation technology. Dispassionate and logical, he acts as the voice of reason and conscience for the team, refusing to kill unless necessary. He repeatedly refuses to kill the Plutonian, insisting that he can be redeemed, going so far as to purposely save Plutonian's life.
Scylla
Twin and partner of Cary. He is romantically involved with Kaidan. Scylla possesses the ability to siphon Cary's energy and use it himself, allowing him to generate energy blasts and fly, but in doing so he diminishes Cary's own power. While investigating a gathering of villains attempting to join forces with Plutonian, he is caught in an explosion and seemingly killed. His brain-dead but living body is later shown to be in the possession of Qubit's rogue Modeus robot and later Modeus himself. When Kaidan cannot summon his ghost, she realizes that Scylla is still alive. Scylla returns as a ghost in Issue #29 after Kaidan frees his spirit by killing his body. He later reveals that he and Cary are not twins but triplets. Following the death of his mind, his share of Scylla's power is split evenly between Scylla and their brother Elliott. Scylla willingly returns to the spirit world to save Kaidan from the alien Kurne, promising to return to her.
Volt
An African-American hero empowered by alien energy during the Vespan invasion. He is capable of emitting powerful electrical discharges from his hands, and flight via controlled release of energy from his hands. He loses the ability to fly after the Plutonian tears off his left arm. When Modeus, in the body of Samsara, deems Volt a threat to Qubit's plan to save the Plutonian, he pushes Volt off a cliff to his death.

=== Recurring ===
Cutter
A green, female alien. Cutter is a telekinetic self-mutilator whose self-harm is inflicted on others rather than herself. Plutonian takes her as a lover after returning to Earth. Issue #31 reveals that Modeus has taken possession of Cutter at an unspecified point. Modeus transfers himself to Bette Noir before hurling Cutter's body from the top of a building.

Kurne
A muscular, purple alien that Plutonian meets on Genhom. Possesses super strength, invulnerability and several mouths on his back which speak incessantly and utter conflicting messages that only Kurne can hear. He is driven insane by the mouths until Plutonian, able to detect their voices, binds them to prevent them speaking. He joins with Plutonian and accompanies him to Earth. Modeus manipulates Kurne into hunting down the remaining Paradigm members by disguising subliminal messages as commands from his back-mouths. He is left trapped in the spirit world after being dragged there by Scylla's ghost.
Modeus
The Plutonian's nemesis. Modeus possesses a genius intellect and an extreme affinity for technology. Modeus disappears for unknown reasons years before the events depicted in the comic. In Issue #9, it is shown that Modeus had Encanta cast a spell that transformed him into pure information, and Modeus then transported himself into Samsara's gem. Although he resides in Samsara's body he is only able to take control after Plutonian lobotomizes Samsara. In Issue #17, it is revealed that Modeus is in love with Plutonian, but his extreme psychopathy and lack of empathy results in him expressing his feelings by trying to destroy everything else that could divert Plutonian's attention from himself: Sky City, his friends and his loved ones. Plutonian eventually admits that he knows Modeus has possessed Samsara's corpse because he recognizes Modeus' mannerisms. Plutonian maims Modeus-Samsara's face. Encanta transfers his essence from Samsara into Qubit's rogue Modeus robot. He contemplates being transferred into Scylla's body but decides against it in favor of his emotionless robot body. Modeus pursues Plutonian to an intergalactic asylum to rescue him but is left stranded there while Plutonian returns to Earth. At an unknown point he takes possession of Plutonian's alien lover Cutter, and then Bette Noir. Modeus later explains that he possessed Bette to combine the body Plutonian desired with his own spirit he deems worthy of Plutonian. Modeus uses Bette's hidden power, unlocked by Modeus, to rape the Plutonian. After Plutonian destroys Bette's body, Modeus transfers himself into Qubit, but his actions are anticipated and he is left trapped by Qubit's mental safeguards. As a child, Modeus helps create the radiation that causes Plutonian's parents self-imprisonment. He is shown to have also introduced Max Damage to Origin, the man who provided Max with his powers, to create another factor in his plans against Plutonian.
Mordanse
A white, beast-like creature capable of altering its form. Possesses super-strength, flight, and invulnerability, and can emit sonic blasts from his mouth. He joins with the Plutonian on Genhom and accompanies him to Earth. Modeus later captures Mordanse in an energy sphere, turning him into a powerful sonic explosive that is expended trying to kill Qubit.
Orian
An extra-dimensional, demonic hunter who has fought the Paradigm in the past and was only defeated because of the Plutonian. He is summoned by the US military to counter the Paradigm and keep them from turning rogue like the Plutonian. He makes an alliance with Survivor to kill Plutonian with Bette's wax candle-coated bullet. While Orian restrains Plutonian for the shot, Qubit creates tiny portals to redirect the bullet and kill Orian instead, knowing that Orian plans to invade Earth.
Samsara
The Plutonian's former sidekick. Samsara is empowered by a mystical crystal embedded in his forehead that enables him to create simple temporary constructs of mystical energy, and which protects him from "mortal harm," making him virtually immortal. Samsara cannot regrow lost tissue or limbs but the crystal keeps him alive long enough for any wound to close naturally. When Samsara discovers the Plutonian is responsible for an accidental viral outbreak that killed thousands of children, Plutonian, enraged that his closest friend has turned on him, lobotomizes Samsara with his eye beams. Samsara's powers keep him alive, but the damaged brain tissue cannot heal, leaving him brain damaged. Effectively dead, he is buried. He eventually returns, claiming his gem healed his mind, and joins Plutonian. It is revealed that his body has been possessed by Plutonian's nemesis, Modeus, as a means to get close to, and manipulate the former hero. Plutonian admits that he has known about the possession since the start, and disfigures Samsara's face to prevent it eliciting sympathy from him. Modeus later abandons the body after being transferred into a robot facsimile of himself.

=== Minor ===
Burrows
A mind-reader and former villain recruited into the new Paradigm after Plutonian's imprisonment. After Plutonian's return, Burrows reads his mind. Traumatized by what he sees, he hangs himself. It is later shown that it was reading Modeus' mind in Cutter's body that caused his suicide.
Elliott
Cary and Scylla's brother, the third of the triplets. As a teenager he starts a heroic career with his brothers but grows disillusioned with how their actions result in death and tormented victims, becoming a priest instead and ignoring his abilities. After Scylla's death, a portion of his power fed into Elliott, increasing his own power. After the source of their power, Cary, is killed, Elliott's power is seemingly lost.
Encanta
A magic villain who uses amulets and other paraphernalia to accomplish her spells. She is kidnapped by the Plutonian (who uses her as a sex slave), and recovered by Qubit to learn the location of Modeus. Years prior to the Plutonian's rampage, Encanta uses her abilities to transform Modeus, at his request, into pure information, allowing him to possess the body of Samsara. She is later retrieved from Qubit by Modeus so that she can transfer him into a new body.
Hornet
A former policeman who relies on skill and gadgets to fight crime. Hornet and his family are murdered by Plutonian at the beginning of the series. Despite his initial resentment of Plutonian for revealing himself to the world as Hornet was about to make his debut, the two come to be partners, with Hornet considering "Tony" his best friend. In Irredeemable #18, it is revealed that Hornet had become suspicious of Tony after he mentions Hornet's wife by name; information Hornet had never shared with him. During an alien invasion years prior to the Plutonian's fall, Hornet makes a secret deal with the aliens, trading them teleportation technology and the locations of various Earth-like worlds in exchange for them not only sparing Earth, but returning to subdue the Plutonian if his fears are realized. Before he dies, he activates a beacon to summon the aliens.
Mallus
An alien that Plutonian meets on Genhom. He possesses a limited chronokinetic ability to facilitate time travel, sending a person through time by punching them, sending someone back further the harder he hits them. He is left trapped on Genhom with Qubit when Plutonian leaves for Earth. Qubit amplifies Mallus' powers to allow greater control over time, but Mallus is unable to endure the process and dies.
Max Damage
One of Plutonian's main enemies during his heroic career, Max is a supervillain who gains superhuman abilities the longer he remains awake. Plutonian harbors particular hatred for him after the two met as teenagers while Max was still unpowered and Plutonian lived in the wild. As adults, Max reminds Plutonian of that time of which he is ashamed.
The Eleos
A race of towering aliens possessing vast abilities including those of the Plutonian. They explore, record, and safeguard the knowledge of all time across multiple universes. Two of the Eleos who were assigned to explore Earth thirty-five years before the events of Irredeemable are responsible for the creation of the Plutonian, creating a probe to explore the unique emotions of humanity which is ultimately transformed into the supervillain.
Agent Nine
Paradigm member. Mentioned in passing by Qubit as being "off the grid" during the Plutonian's initial rampage.
Citadel
Paradigm member. Killed by the Plutonian's heat vision alongside Metalman.
Gazer
Paradigm member. Possesses telepathic powers capable of extending his "sight and hearing" by linking with the minds of others.
Inferno
Paradigm member. Real name Martin Reber. A "Wall Street billionaire" turned vigilante; he possesses a reputation as an excellent tactician. Punched through the head and killed during the Plutonian's initial rampage.
Metalman
Possesses superhuman durability. He is torn in half by the Plutonian while defending a school of children from his initial rampage.

== Reception ==
Initial critical reception for the series was positive, the first issue receiving 3.5 out of 5 stars from Comic Book Resources, complimenting the way the art worked with the story, and 4 out of 5 stars from Major Spoilers. John Hardick of The Express-Times describes the series as "on its way to becoming one of the best books of the year". Stephen Joyce at Comics Bulletin praised the writing, characters and art (in particular the coloring) in the first issue, concluding "This is an amazing book! I cannot stress how much I truly enjoyed it." Although the second issue was less action-packed Joyce still thought it was a "great story" and despite only being two installments in he says "I’m willing to bet that this story becomes a classic once it is completed".

=== Accolades ===
Year	Award	Category	Recipient	Result	Ref.
2010	Eisner Award	Best Continuing Series	Irredeemable (Mark Waid and Peter Krause)	Nominated	
2010	Eisner Award	Best Writer	Mark Waid (shared for Irredeemable and The Incredibles)	Nominated	
2010	Eisner Award	Best Cover Artist	John Cassaday (shared for Irredeemable and The Lone Ranger)	Nominated	
2010	Harvey Award	Best Writer	Mark Waid	Nominated	
2010	Harvey Award	Best New Series	Irredeemable	Nominated	
2011	Harvey Award	Best Writer	Mark Waid	Nominated	
2012	Eisner Award	Best Writer	Mark Waid (shared for Irredeemable, Incorruptible, and Daredevil)	Won	

== Collected editions ==
Volume	Material collected	Release date	ISBN
Irredeemable Vol. 1	Irredeemable #1–4	October 6, 2009	1-934506-90-7
Irredeemable Vol. 2	Irredeemable #5–8	March 23, 2010	1-60886-000-0
Irredeemable Vol. 3	Irredeemable #9–12	July 6, 2010	1-60886-008-6
Irredeemable Vol. 4	Irredeemable #13–15 and Irredeemable Special #1	November 9, 2010	1-60886-029-9
Irredeemable Vol. 5	Irredeemable #16–19	February 1, 2011	1-60886-040-X
Irredeemable Vol. 6	Irredeemable #20–23	June 7, 2011	1-60886-054-X
Irredeemable Vol. 7	Irredeemable #24–27	October 4, 2011	1-60886-055-8
Irredeemable Vol. 8	Irredeemable #28–31	February 7, 2012	1-60886-082-5
Irredeemable Vol. 9	Irredeemable #32–33 and Incorruptible #25–26	June 5, 2012	1-60886-083-3
Irredeemable Vol. 10	Irredeemable #34–37	September 4, 2012	1-60886-275-5
Irredeemable Definitive Edition	Irredeemable #1-12	September 20, 2011	978-1608860715
Irredeemable Premier Edition Vol. 1	Irredeemable #1-8	November 17, 2015	978-1608867882
Irredeemable Premier Edition Vol. 2	Irredeemable #9-15 and Irredeemable Special #1	June 21, 2016	978-1608868704
Irredeemable Premier Edition Vol. 3	Irredeemable #16-23	January 3, 2017	978-1608869152
Irredeemable Premier Edition Vol. 4	Irredeemable #24-31	August 10, 2017	978-1608869787
Irredeemable Premier Edition Vol. 5	Irredeemable #32-37 and Incorruptible #25-26	May 17, 2018	978-1684151257
Irredeemable Omnibus	Irredeemable #1-37, Irredeemable Special #1 and Incorruptible #25-26	July 23, 2020	978-1684155460

== Film adaptation ==
On May 5, 2016, Deadline Hollywood announced that 20th Century Fox was producing a feature film adaptation of the comic book written by Tommy Wirkola and directed by Adam McKay.

On March 17, 2022, it was announced that Netflix will be adapting the comic book into a feature film, combining both Irredeemable and Incorruptible. Jeymes Samuel is set to direct from a screenplay by Kemp Powers. Jay-Z will produce the film, with Wirkola and McKay no longer attached.

== Incorruptible ==
In December 2009, a spin-off titled Incorruptible was released, chronicling the reformation of former supervillain—and one of Plutonian's greatest enemies—Max Damage, into a hero after he witnesses the atrocities committed by Plutonian. The series finished in June 2012 with issue #30.

== See also ==
- Brightburn
- Homelander
- Omni-Man
- Pantheon (Lone Star Press)
- Squadron Supreme
- Watchmen
