= Picture bible =

Picture bible or Picture Bible may refer to:

- Bible moralisée, a form of Medieval illustrated bible
- The Picture Bible, 1978, a comic-strip version of the Christian bible
