= The Brick Bible =

Lego illustrations of Bible stories

- "Adam and Eve" from the original Brick Testament website
- Available in: English
- Creator: Elbe Spurling
- Website: www.thebrickbible.com
- Commercial: No
- Launched: October 2001; 25 years ago
- Current status: Inactive

The Brick Bible (originally published as The Brick Testament) is a project created by Elbe Spurling in which Bible stories are illustrated using still photographs of dioramas constructed entirely out of Lego bricks.

The Brick Testament project began as a website in October 2001 that featured six stories from the Book of Genesis, and is completely unaffiliated with The Lego Group. The website contains over 400 illustrated stories, from both the Old and New Testaments, and over 4,500 images. As of 2009, the website had had over two million visitors. Several hardcover Brick Testament books have been published. The US retailer Sam's Club withdrew The Brick Bible from sale in November 2011 due to complaints from customers that the book contained "vulgar and violent" content.

== See also ==
- The Action Bible
- The Manga Bible: From Genesis to Revelation
