= Mark Waid bibliography =

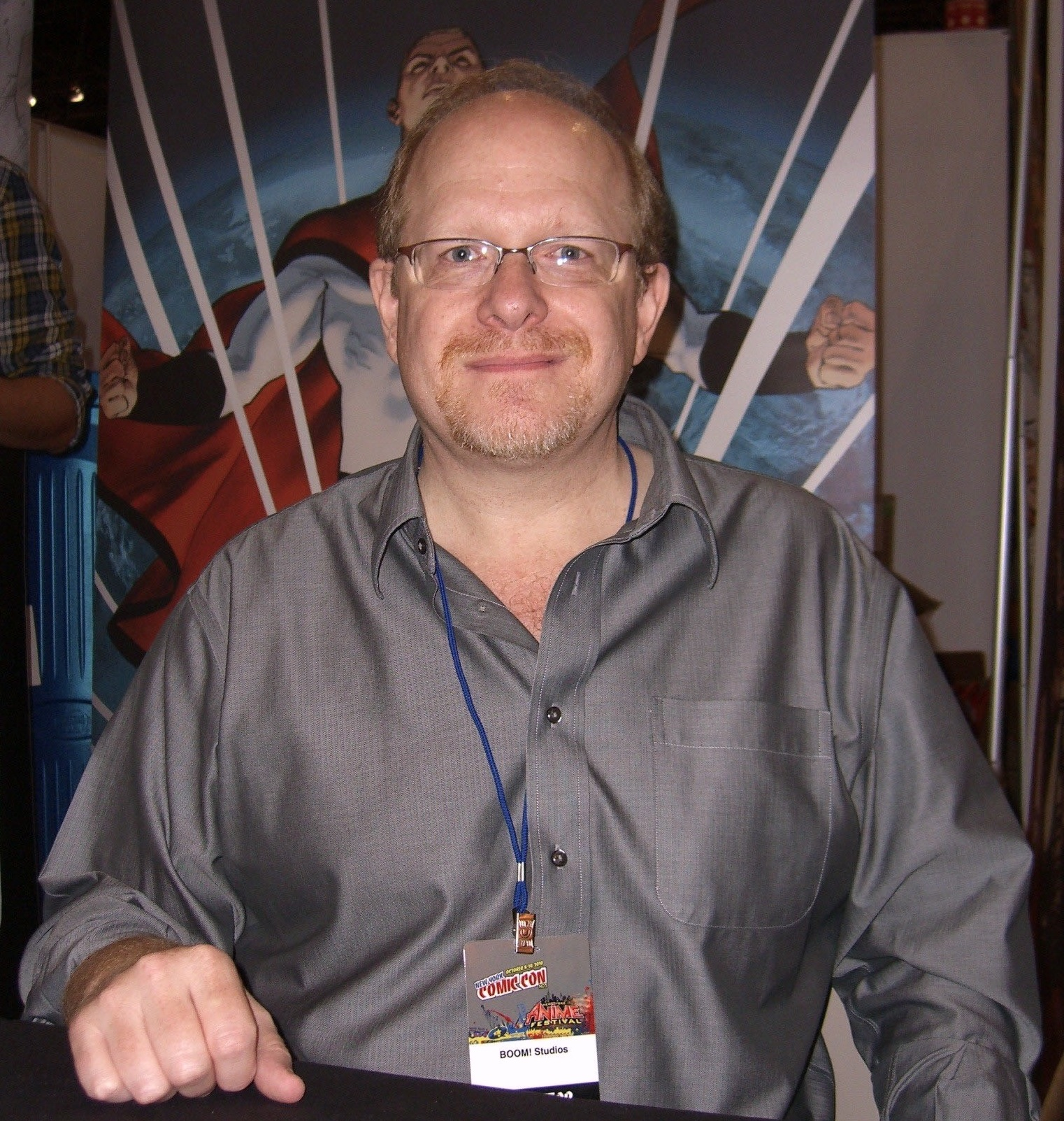
- Waid at the New York Comic Con in Manhattan, October 10, 2010.
- Active period: 1983–present

Publishers
- DC Comics: 1985–present
- Marvel Comics: 1994–present
- Boom! Studios: 2005–present

This is a bibliography of American comic book writer Mark Waid, who is known for his work on DC Comics titles The Flash, Kingdom Come and Superman: Birthright as well as his work on Captain America, Fantastic Four and Daredevil for Marvel. From August 2007 to December 2010, Waid served as Editor-in-Chief and later Chief Creative Officer of Boom! Studios, where he also published his creator-owned series Irredeemable and Incorruptible. In 2012, Waid, along with fellow comic book writer John Rogers, founded Thrillbent, a platform for digital comics that hosted a number of series written by Waid himself. In October 2018, Waid joined Humanoids Publishing as Director of Creative Development before being promoted to Publisher in February 2020. In addition to that, Waid has written for a variety of American comics publishers, including Fantagraphics, Event, Top Cow, Dynamite and Archie Comics.

== Early work ==
Titles written and/or edited by Waid early in his career include:

- Fantagraphics:
  - Amazing Heroes #32–33, 38, 41, 48–50, 53, 58, 60, 62, 66, 68, 78–79, 87, 89, 91–92, 96, 98 (as contributing writer, fanzine, 1983–1986)
    - Waid is also credited as "guest editor" in Amazing Heroes #91 ("Special Post-Crisis Issue") and as "managing editor" in issues #102–108 (1986)
  - Focus on George Pérez: "The Keen Teens" (article co-written by Waid and R. A. Jones for the retrospective book, 120 pages, 1985, ISBN 0-930193-09-1)
  - Honk! #1–3 (with Kim Thompson and Andrew Christie (#2–3) — as "contributing editor"; magazine about alternative comics edited by Tom Mason, 1986–1987)
    - Issue #2 features "The Late Night World of Drew Friedman", an interview conducted by Waid and accompanied by samples of Friedman's work.
- Independent Comics Group:
  - The Official Crisis on Infinite Earths Index + The Official Crisis on Infinite Earths Cross-Over Index (co-written by Waid and Lou Mougin, one-shots, 1986)
  - The Legion of Super-Heroes Index #1–5 (co-written by Waid and Andrew MacLaney, 1986–1987)
- Eddy Current #1: "A Chat with Ted McKeever" (one-page interview conducted by Waid, Mad Dog, 1987)
- Comics Week #1–4 (as editor; magazine produced by Mike Fisher and published by Paragon Q, 1987)

== DC Comics ==
Titles published by DC Comics include:

=== As writer ===
- Superman:
  - Action Comics:
    - "The Puzzle of the Purloined Fortress!" (with Rick Hoberg, in #572, 1985)
    - "The 'Monumental' Menace of Metropolis!" (with Paris Cullins, in #576, 1986)
    - "Burden of Proof" (with Tom Grummett, in #737, 1997)
  - Superboy: The Comic Book #7: "Murmurs of the Heart!" (with Jim Mooney, 1990)
  - The Silver Age of Superman: The Greatest Covers of Action Comics from the '50s to the '70s (features commentary from Waid; hc, 152 pages, Abbeville Press, 1995, ISBN 0-89660-055-6)
  - Adventures of Superman #536 + Action Comics #723 + Superman: The Man of Steel #58 + Superman vol. 2 #114: "Identity Crisis" (co-written by Waid and Tom Peyer, art by Chris Renaud, Curt Swan, Steven Butler and Chris Marrinan, 1996)
  - Superman: The Man of Steel #73: "Gang War" (dialogue; plot by Louise Simonson, art by Scot Eaton, 1997)
  - Superman: Birthright #1–12 (with Leinil Francis Yu, 2003–2004) collected as Superman: Birthright (hc, 304 pages, 2004, ISBN 1-4012-0251-9; tpb, 2005, ISBN 1-4012-0252-7)
  - Superman/Batman Secret Files & Origins: "Young Luthor in Smallville" (with Renato Guedes, co-feature in one-shot, 2003) collected in Superman/Batman Omnibus Volume 1 (hc, 1,208 pages, 2020, ISBN 1-77950-029-7)
  - Dark Nights: Death Metal — The Last Stories of the DC Universe: "Man of Tomorrow" (with Francis Manapul, anthology one-shot, 2020) collected in Dark Nights: Death Metal — War of the Multiverses (tpb, 176 pages, 2021, ISBN 1-77951-006-3)
  - Superman: Red and Blue #4: "Namrepus" (with Audrey Mok, anthology, 2021) collected in Superman: Red and Blue (hc, 272 pages, 2021, ISBN 1-77951-280-5; tpb, 2022, ISBN 1-77951-747-5)
  - Superman: Kal-El Returns Special: "The Concert That Ate Gotham" (with Clayton Henry, co-feature, 2023) collected in Superman: Kal-El Returns (tpb, 232 pages, 2023, ISBN 1-77952-058-1)
  - Tales from Earth-6: A Celebration of Stan Lee: "Make War No More" (with Kevin Maguire, anthology one-shot, 2023)
  - Superman: The Last Days of Lex Luthor #1–3 (with Bryan Hitch, DC Black Label, 2023–2025)
- Legion of Super-Heroes:
  - Focus: "Historical Perspective: The Wanderers" (text article in the free promotional one-shot, 1987)
  - Valor #9, 11–19 (with Paris Cullins (#9), Jeffrey Moore (#11–13) and Colleen Doran, 1993–1994)
  - Legionnaires #16 (with Chris Gardner) and Annual #1 (script by Waid from a plot by Waid and Ty Templeton, art by Paul Pelletier and Jeff Moy, 1994)
  - Legion of Super-Heroes vol. 4 #59: "War on Weber's World, Part Six" (script by Waid from a plot by Waid and Tom McCraw, art by Stuart Immonen, 1994)
  - Legion of Super-Heroes: End of an Era:
    - Legionnaires #17–18: "Parts One and Four" (with Chris Gardner; issue #18 is scripted by Waid from a plot by Waid and Tom McCraw, 1994)
    - Legion of Super-Heroes vol. 4 #60–61: "Parts Three and Six" (with Stuart Immonen, 1994)
  - Legion of Super-Heroes vol. 4 (co-written by Waid, Tom McCraw and Tom Peyer (#68–71), art by Stuart Immonen (#0), Lee Moder, Chris Renaud (#67) and Jason Armstrong (#70), 1994–1995) collected as:
    - Legionnaires Book One (includes #0 and 62–68, tpb, 384 pages, 2017, ISBN 1-4012-6866-8)
      - Also collects Legionnaires #0 (co-written by Waid and Tom McCraw, art by Jeff Moy, 1994)
      - Also collects Legionnaires #19 (script by Tom Peyer from a plot by Waid and Tom McCraw, art by Jeff Moy, 1994)
    - Legionnaires Book Two (includes #69–71 and Annual #6, tpb, 392 pages, 2018, ISBN 1-4012-7381-5)
      - Also collects Legionnaires Annual #2 (co-written by Waid, Tom McCraw and Tom Peyer, art by Jeff Moy, 1995)
  - Legion of Super-Heroes vol. 5 (with Barry Kitson, Leonard Kirk + Dave Gibbons (#4), Kevin Sharpe (#8), Georges Jeanty (#9), Ken Lashley (#12 and 14) and Adam DeKraker, 2005–2007) collected as:
    - Starting with issue #16, the series changed its title to Supergirl and the Legion of Super-Heroes; issues #20–22 are co-written by Waid and Tony Bedard.
      - Teenage Revolution (collects #1–6, tpb, 200 pages, 2005, ISBN 1-4012-0482-1)
        - Includes Teen Titans/Legion Special (co-written by Waid and Geoff Johns, art by Joe Prado and Ivan Reis, 2004)
      - Death of a Dream (collects #7–13, tpb, 200 pages, 2006, ISBN 1-4012-0971-8)
      - Strange Visitor from Another Century (collects #14–19, tpb, 144 pages, 2006, ISBN 1-4012-0916-5)
      - Adult Education (collects #20–25, tpb, 192 pages, 2007, ISBN 1-4012-1244-1)
      - The Dominator War (collects #26–30, tpb, 128 pages, 2007, ISBN 1-4012-1442-8)
- Action Comics Weekly #641: "The 'Pow! Zap! Wham!' Contract" (with Curt Swan, anthology, 1989)
- Aquaman vol. 3 #1, 3, 5: "Time and Tide" (serialized text article on Aquaman's publication history, 1989) reprinted in Aquaman: The Legend of Aquaman (tpb, 176 pages, 2018, ISBN 1-4012-7793-4)
- Secret Origins vol. 2 #40: "IF U CN RD THS" (with Mark Badger, anthology, 1989) collected in DC's Greatest Detective Stories Ever Told (tpb, 232 pages, 2021, ISBN 1-77950-594-9)
  - The story is co-scripted by Waid and Dan Raspler — collectively credited as "Rusty Wells" — from a plot by Andy Helfer.
- Batman:
  - Detective Comics Annual #2: "Blood Secrets" (co-written by Waid and Brian Augustyn, art by Val Semeiks, 1989) collected in Batman: The Dark Knight Detective Volume 4 (tpb, 328 pages, 2021, ISBN 1-77950-749-6)
  - Batman: Legends of the Dark Knight Annual #4: "Citizen Wayne" (co-written by Waid and Brian Augustyn, art by Joe Staton, 1994) collected in Superman/Batman: Alternate Histories (tpb, 224 pages, 1996, ISBN 1-56389-263-4)
  - Batman in Barcelona: Dragon's Knight (with Diego Olmos, one-shot, 2009) collected in Batman International (tpb, 168 pages, 2010, ISBN 1-4012-2649-3)
  - Batman vs. Robin #1–5 (with Mahmud Asrar and Scott Godlewski (#3–4), 2022–2023) collected as Batman vs. Robin (hc, 248 pages, 2023, ISBN 1-77951-859-5)
- The Flash:
  - The Flash TV Special: "Meet Kid Flash" (with Darick Robertson and David A. Williams, co-feature, 1991)
  - The Flash vol. 2 (with E. Craig Brasfield (Annual #4), Greg LaRocque, Michael T. Collins (#66), Travis Charest (Annual #5), Sal Velluto (#72), Mike Wieringo, Phil Hester (Annual #6), Barry Kitson (#84), Kris Renkewitz (#89), Carlos Pacheco (#94, 99–100), Salvador Larroca (#95–100), Óscar Jiménez, David Brewer (Annual #8), Roger Robinson (#103–104), Ron Lim (#105), Anthony Castrillo (#112–114), Jim Cheung (#115 and 117), Sergio Cariello (#118), Paul Ryan, Pop Mhan (#142–144), Josh Hood (#1,000,000) and Paul Pelletier; Annual #5 is co-written by Waid and Craig Boldman, issues #69–70 are co-written by Waid and Gerard Jones, issues #102–105 and 1,000,000 are co-written by Waid and Michael Jan Friedman, issues #118–150, 152–159 and 162 are co-written by Waid and Brian Augustyn, 1991–2000) collected as:
    - The Flash by Mark Waid Book One (collects #62–68 and Annual #4–5, tpb, 368 pages, 2016, ISBN 1-4012-6735-1)
      - Includes the "Generations" framing story (art by Mike Parobeck) from The Flash 50th Anniversary Special (1990)
    - The Flash by Mark Waid Book Two (collects #69–79 and Annual #6, tpb, 432 pages, 2017, ISBN 1-4012-6844-7)
      - Includes Green Lantern vol. 3 #30–31 (co-written by Waid and Gerard Jones, art by Mark D. Bright, 1992)
      - Includes the "Half an Inch" short story (art by Patrick Zircher) from Justice League Quarterly #10 (anthology, 1993)
    - The Flash by Mark Waid Book Three (collects #80–94, tpb, 368 pages, 2017, ISBN 1-4012-7392-0)
    - The Flash by Mark Waid Book Four (collects #0, 95–105 and Annual #8, tpb, 368 pages, 2018, ISBN 1-4012-7821-3)
    - The Flash by Mark Waid Book Five (collects #106–118 and Impulse #10–11, tpb, 368 pages, 2018, ISBN 1-4012-8460-4)
    - The Flash by Mark Waid Book Six (collects #119–129, tpb, 440 pages, 2019, ISBN 1-4012-9380-8)
      - Includes the "Overrun" short story (co-written by Waid and Brian Augustyn, art by Óscar Jiménez) from Showcase '96 #12 (anthology, 1996)
      - Includes the "Present Tense" short story (co-written by Waid and Brian Augustyn, art by Paul Ryan) from DC Universe Holiday Bash #1 (anthology, 1997)
      - Also collects Green Lantern/Flash: Faster Friends #1 (written by Ron Marz, drawn by Ron Lim, Tom Grindberg, Jeff Johnson, Bart Sears and Andy Smith, 1997)
      - Includes Flash/Green Lantern: Faster Friends #2 (co-written by Waid and Brian Augustyn, art by Val Semeiks, 1997)
      - Includes the Flash + Nightwing one-shot (co-written by Waid and Brian Augustyn, art by Eduardo Baretto, 1997)
    - The Flash by Mark Waid Book Seven (collects #142–150 and 1,000,000, tpb, 448 pages, 2020, ISBN 1-77950-019-X)
      - Includes the "A Run of Luck" short story (co-written by Waid and Brian Augustyn, art by Kenneth Martinez) from The Flash Secret Files & Origins #1 (1997)
      - Includes the "Burning Secrets" (art by Jim Aparo) and "The Sacrifice" (co-written by Waid and Brian Augustyn, art by Will Rosado) short stories from Speed Force (anthology one-shot, 1997)
      - Includes The Life Story of the Flash prose novel (co-written by Waid and Brian Augustyn, illustrated by Gil Kane and Joe Staton, hc 96 pages, 1997, ISBN 1-56389-365-7; sc, 1998, ISBN 1-56389-389-4)
      - Includes "The Speed of Life" short story (art by Pop Mhan) from The Flash 80-Page Giant #1 (anthology, 1998)
    - The Flash by Mark Waid Book Eight (includes #152–159 and 162, tpb, 400 pages, 2021, ISBN 1-77951-010-1)
      - Also collects the "Twenty-First Century Rogue" short story (co-written by Waid and Brian Augustyn, art by Ron Lim) from The Flash Secret Files & Origins #2 (1999)
      - Also collects The Flash vol. 2 #151 (framing sequence co-written by Waid and Brian Augustyn and drawn by Paul Pelletier; issue written by Joe Casey and drawn by Duncan Rouleau, 1999)
      - Also collects The Flash vol. 2 #160 (written by Brian Augustyn, drawn by Scott Kolins, 2000)
      - Also collects The Flash vol. 2 #161 and 163 (written by Pat McGreal, drawn by Paul Pelletier (#161) and Ron Lim (#163), 2000)
  - Impulse #1–6, 8–17, 19–21, 23–27 (with Humberto Ramos, Anthony Williams (#14–15) and Craig Rousseau (#21), 1995–1997)
    - Issues #1–6 and 8–12 are collected in Flash/Impulse: Runs in the Family (tpb, 376 pages, 2021, ISBN 1-77950-948-0)
    - In addition to writing the ongoing series, Waid penned a number of short stories for various anthologies published by DC:
      - Robin + Impulse (co-written by Waid and Brian Augustyn, art by John Royle, one-shot, 1996)
      - Secret Origins 80-Page Giant: "Actual Reality" (with Humberto Ramos, anthology one-shot, 1998)
      - Green Lantern 80-Page Giant #2: "The Lantern's Apprentice" (with Mike McKone, anthology, 1999)
      - DC Universe Holiday Bash #3: "No, Bart, There is No Santa Claus" (co-written by Waid and Devin K. Grayson, art by Craig Rousseau, anthology, 1999) collected in A DC Universe Christmas (tpb, 160 pages, 2000, ISBN 1-56389-640-0)
  - Flash/Green Lantern: The Brave and the Bold #1–6 (co-written by Waid and Tom Peyer, art by Barry Kitson, 1999–2000) collected as Flash/Green Lantern: The Brave and the Bold (tpb, 144 pages, 2001, ISBN 1-56389-708-3; hc, 2019, ISBN 1-4012-8813-8)
  - Green Lantern Secret Files & Origins #2: "Green Lantern and the Flash Fight Axis Smugglers!" (with Joe Staton) — "The Star Sheriffs" (with Gil Kane) — "My Enemy Before Me!" (with Georges Jeanty, co-features, 1999)
  - All-Flash (with Daniel Acuña, Joe Bennett, Ian Churchill, Manuel García, Karl Kerschl, one-shot, 2007) collected in The Fastest Man Alive: Full Throttle (tpb, 208 pages, 2007, ISBN 1-4012-1567-X)
  - The Flash vol. 2 #231–236 (with Daniel Acuña (#231–232), Freddie E. Williams II and Doug Braithwaite, 2007–2008) collected as The Flash: The Wild Wests (hc, 160 pages, 2008, ISBN 1-4012-1828-8)
  - Infinite Halloween Special: "The Speed of Life" (with Ryan Sook, anthology one-shot, 2007)
  - The Flash #800: "The Max in the Mirror" (with Todd Nauck, co-feature, 2023)
- Justice League of America:
  - Justice League Quarterly (anthology):
    - "Be Careful What You Wish for!" (with Mike McKone, in #5, 1991)
    - "Take My Wife—Please!" (with Eduardo Baretto, in #6, 1992)
    - "Double Trouble" (with Rod Whigham, in #8, 1992)
    - "Frenzy" (with Rod Whigham, in #9, 1992)
    - "Time and Chance!" (with Rod Whigham) and "When Titans Date" (with Ty Templeton, in #10, 1993)
    - "Negative Feedback" (with Tony Daniel and Daniel Rodriguez, in #12, 1993)
  - Justice League Task Force #13–15, 0, 17–20 (with Sal Velluto; issues #18–20 are co-written by Waid and Christopher Priest, 1994–1995)
    - Issues #13–14 are collected in Wonder Woman and the Justice League America Volume 2 (tpb, 192 pages, 2017, ISBN 1-4012-7400-5)
  - Justice League: A Midsummer's Nightmare #1–3 (co-written by Waid and Fabian Nicieza, art by Jeff Johnson and Darick Robertson, 1996) collected as JLA: A Midsummer's Nightmare (tpb, 128 pages, 1996, ISBN 1-56389-338-X; hc, 2017, ISBN 1-4012-7432-3)
  - JLA: Year One #1–12 (co-written by Waid and Brian Augustyn, art by Barry Kitson, 1998) collected as JLA: Year One (tpb, 320 pages, 1999, ISBN 1-56389-512-9; hc, 336 pages, 2017, ISBN 1-4012-7086-7)
  - JLA (with Howard Porter, Arnie Jorgensen (#20–21), Mark Pajarillo (#32–33), Steve Scott (#46), Bryan Hitch, Mike S. Miller (#51, 56–58) and Cliff Rathburn (#60); issue #32 is co-written by Waid and Devin K. Grayson, 1998–2002) collected as:
    - The Deluxe Edition Volume 3 (includes #18–21, tpb, 344 pages, 2013, ISBN 1-4012-3832-7)
    - The Deluxe Edition Volume 4 (includes #32–33 and 43–46, tpb, 384 pages, 2014, ISBN 1-4012-4385-1)
    - The Deluxe Edition Volume 5 (collects #47–60 and JLA: Heaven's Ladder, tpb, 448 pages, 2014, ISBN 1-4012-4750-4)
    - Tower of Babel (collects #18–21, 32–33 and 43–46, hc, 280 pages, 2021, ISBN 1-77950-951-0)
      - Includes the "Lost Pages" segment (art by Steve Scott) from JLA Secret Files & Origins #3 (2000)
  - JLA: Heaven's Ladder (with Bryan Hitch, tabloid-sized graphic novel, 72 pages, 2000, ISBN 1-56389-753-9)
- Green Lantern:
  - Green Lantern vol. 3 #19: "Strange Schwartz Stories" (text article on Green Lantern's publication history, 1991)
  - Green Lantern Corps Quarterly #2: "Two-Minute Warning" (with Ty Templeton, anthology, 1992)
- DC Silver Age Classics (series of one-shot reprints of classic issues):
  - Detective Comics #225: "Classics Comments" (text article on the debut of Martian Manhunter, 1992)
  - House of Secrets #92: "Classics Comments" (text article on the debut of Swamp Thing, 1992)
- Justice Society of America:
  - Justice Society of America vol. 2 #1 (untitled text article on the publication history of the Justice Society of America, 1992)
  - National Comics: "Fair Play" (with Aaron Lopresti, one-shot, 1999)
    - Collected in The Justice Society Returns (tpb, 256 pages, 2003, ISBN 1-4012-0090-7)
    - Collected in JSA Omnibus Volume 1 (hc, 1,224 pages, 2014, ISBN 1-4012-4761-X)
  - All-Star Comics 80-Page Giant: "Steam Engine" (with Adam DeKraker, anthology one-shot, 1999)
- L.E.G.I.O.N. '93 #49–50, 52–60, Annual #4 (with Barry Kitson, Scott Kolins (#52), Val Semeiks (#56), Stephen B. Jones (#58 and 60) and Arnie Jorgensen (#59), 1993)
  - Issues #49–50, 52–55 and 57–60 are scripted by Waid from a plot by Waid and Barry Kitson.
- DC Universe: Trinity #1–2: "L.E.G.I.O.N." (with Barry Kitson, anthology, 1993)
- Metamorpho vol. 2 #1–4 (with Graham Nolan, 1993)
- The Ray vol. 2 #8: "The Main Man" (plot assist; written by Christopher Priest, art by Howard Porter, 1995)
- Underworld Unleashed #1–3 (with Howard Porter, 1995) collected as Underworld Unleashed (tpb, 176 pages, 1998, ISBN 1-56389-447-5)
- Kingdom Come #1–4 (with Alex Ross, 1996) collected as Kingdom Come (tpb, 232 pages, 1997, ISBN 1-56389-330-4; Absolute Edition, hc, 340 pages, 2006, ISBN 1-4012-0768-5)
- Gross Point #1: "Welcome to Gross Point" (co-written by Waid and Brian Augustyn, art by S. M. Taggart, anthology, 1997)
- The Kingdom (series of one-shots bookended by two issues of the eponymous limited series):
  - The Kingdom (tpb, 232 pages, 2000, ISBN 1-56389-567-6) collects:
    - New Year's Evil: Gog (with Jerry Ordway, one-shot, 1998)
    - The Kingdom #1–2 (with Mike Zeck, 1999)
    - The Kingdom: Kid Flash (with Mark Pajarillo, one-shot, 1999)
    - The Kingdom: Nightstar (with Matt Haley, one-shot, 1999)
    - The Kingdom: Offspring (with Frank Quitely, one-shot, 1999)
    - The Kingdom: Planet Krypton (with Barry Kitson, one-shot, 1999)
    - The Kingdom: Son of the Bat (with Brian Apthorp, one-shot, 1999)
- Elseworlds 80-Page Giant: "Silver Age Elseworlds" (with Ty Templeton, anthology one-shot, 1999) collected in Elseworlds: Justice League Volume 2 (tpb, 424 pages, 2017, ISBN 1-4012-6855-2)
- Wild Times: Wetworks: "Still Waters Run Deep" (with Aaron Lopresti, one-shot, Wildstorm, 1999)
- Silver Age (fifth-week event released as a series of one-shots and miscellaneous publications):
  - Silver Age: "Pawns of the Invincible Immortal!" (with Terry Dodson, one-shot, 2000)
  - Silver Age: Dial H for Hero: "The One-Man Justice League" (with Barry Kitson, one-shot, 2000)
  - Silver Age 80-Page Giant: "S.O.S. to Nowhere!" (with Eduardo Baretto, anthology one-shot, 2000)
  - Silver Age Secret Files & Origins: "The Secret of the H-Dial" (with Jim Mooney, co-feature in one-shot, 2000)
- Empire vol. 2 #1–6 (with Barry Kitson, 2003–2004) collected as Empire (tpb, 208 pages, 2004, ISBN 1-4012-0212-8)
  - The series was preceded by the release of Empire #0 which reprinted the material previously published under Image.
  - In 2014, Waid re-released the existing issues and continued the series on Thrillbent, his own platform for digital comics.
- DC Comics Presents: The Atom: "Ride a Deadly Grenade!" (with Dan Jurgens, co-feature in one-shot, 2004)
- 52 (co-written by Waid, Grant Morrison, Geoff Johns and Greg Rucka, art by various artists from layouts by Keith Giffen, 2006–2007) collected as:
  - Volume 1 (collects #1–13, tpb, 304 pages, 2007, ISBN 1-4012-1353-7)
  - Volume 2 (collects #14–26, tpb, 304 pages, 2007, ISBN 1-4012-1364-2)
  - Volume 3 (collects #27–39, tpb, 304 pages, 2007, ISBN 1-4012-1443-6)
  - Volume 4 (collects #40–52, tpb, 326 pages, 2007, ISBN 1-4012-1486-X)
  - Omnibus (collects #1–52, hc, 1,216 pages, 2012, ISBN 1-4012-3556-5)
- DC Universe: Origins (tpb, 160 pages, 2010, ISBN 1-4012-2646-9) includes:
  - 52:
    - "The Origin of Wonder Woman" (with Adam Hughes, co-feature in #12, 2006)
    - "The Origin of Elongated Man" (with Kevin Nowlan, co-feature in #13, 2006)
    - "The Origin of Metamorpho" (with Eric Powell, co-feature in #14, 2006)
    - "The Origin of Steel" (with Jon Bogdanove, co-feature in #15, 2006)
    - "The Origin of Black Adam" (with J. G. Jones, co-feature in #16, 2006)
    - "The Origin of Lobo" (with Keith Giffen, co-feature in #17, 2006)
    - "The Origin of the Question" (with Joe Bennett, co-feature in #18, 2006)
    - "The Origin of Animal Man" (with Brian Bolland, co-feature in #19, 2006)
    - "The Origin of Adam Strange" (with Kevin Nowlan, co-feature in #20, 2006)
    - "The Origin of Green Lantern" (with Ivan Reis, co-feature in #22, 2006)
    - "The Origin of Wildcat" (with Jerry Ordway, co-feature in #23, 2006)
    - "The Origin of Booster Gold" (with Dan Jurgens, co-feature in #24, 2006)
    - "The Origin of Nightwing" (with George Pérez, co-feature in #25, 2006)
    - "The Origin of Hawkman and Hawkgirl" (with Joe Bennett, co-feature in #26, 2006)
    - "The Origin of Black Canary" (with Howard Chaykin, co-feature in #27, 2006)
    - "The Origin of Catman" (with Dale Eaglesham, co-feature in #28, 2006)
    - "The Origin of Metal Men" (with Duncan Rouleau, co-feature in #30, 2006)
    - "The Origin of Robin" (with Freddie E. Williams II, co-feature in #31, 2006)
    - "The Origin of Blue Beetle" (with Cully Hamner, co-feature in #32, 2006)
    - "The Origin of Martian Manhunter" (with Tom Mandrake, co-feature in #33, 2006)
    - "The Origin of Zatanna" (with Brian Bolland, co-feature in #34, 2006)
    - "The Origin of Power Girl" (with Adam Hughes, co-feature in #36, 2007)
    - "The Origin of Firestorm" (with Jamal Igle, co-feature in #37, 2007)
    - "The Origin of Red Tornado" (with Phil Jimenez, co-feature in #38, 2007)
    - "The Origin of Mister Terrific" (with Ethan Van Sciver, co-feature in #39, 2007)
    - "The Origin of Starfire" (with Joe Benitez, co-feature in #41, 2007)
    - "The Origin of Green Arrow" (with Scott McDaniel, co-feature in #42, 2007)
    - "The Origin of Plastic Man" (with Ethan Van Sciver, co-feature in #43, 2007)
    - "The Origin of Batman" (with Andy Kubert, co-feature in #46, 2007)
    - "The Origin of the Teen Titans" (with Karl Kerschl, co-feature in #47, 2007)
    - "The Origin of the Birds of Prey" (with Nicola Scott, co-feature in #48, 2007)
    - "The Origin of the Justice Society of America" (with Don Kramer, co-feature in #49, 2007)
    - "The Origin of the Justice League of America" (with Ivan Reis, co-feature in #51, 2007)
  - Countdown to Final Crisis:
    - "The Origin of the Joker" (with Brian Bolland, co-feature in #31, 2007)
    - "The Origin of Two-Face" (with Mark Chiarello, co-feature in #27, 2007)
- The Brave and the Bold vol. 3 (with George Pérez, Jerry Ordway (#11–13) and Scott Kolins (#14–16), 2007–2008) collected as:
  - The Lords of Luck (collects #1–6, hc, 160 pages, 2007, ISBN 1-4012-1503-3; tpb, 2008, ISBN 1-4012-1588-2)
  - The Book of Destiny (collects #7–12, hc, 160 pages, 2008, ISBN 1-4012-1838-5; tpb, 2009, ISBN 1-4012-1861-X)
  - Demons and Dragons (collects #13–16, hc, 168 pages, 2009, ISBN 1-4012-2190-4; tpb, 2010, ISBN 1-4012-2191-2)
- Countdown to Mystery #8: "The Fifty-Minute Hour" (with Michael O'Hare, co-feature, 2008) collected in Doctor Fate: Countdown to Mystery (tpb, 160 pages, 2008, ISBN 1-4012-1840-7)
- Wonder Woman: 80th Anniversary 100-Page Super Spectacular: "Dear Diana..." (with José Luis García-López, anthology one-shot, 2021)
- Batman/Superman: World's Finest #1–ongoing (with Dan Mora, Travis Moore (#6, 18-19), Emanuela Lupacchino (#12), Gleb Melnikov (#30), Adrian Gutierrez (#31-33, 35-37, 40-43), Fran Galan (#34), Clayton Henry (#38-39), and Dan McDaid (2025 Annual #1); 2022–present)
  - The Devil Nezha (collects #1–5, hc, 160 pages, 2023, ISBN 1-77951-840-4; tpb, 2024, ISBN 1-77952-470-6)
  - Strange Visitor (collects #6–11, hc, 176 pages, 2023, ISBN 1-77952-048-4; tpb, 2024, ISBN 1-77952-716-0)
  - Elementary (collects #12–17, hc, 168 pages, 2024, ISBN 1-77952-477-3; tpb, 2024, ISBN 1-77952-978-3)
  - Return to Kingdom Come (collects #20-24, hc, 144 pages, 2024, ISBN 1-77952-748-9; tpb, 2024, ISBN 1-77952-939-2)
  - Secret Origins (collects #18-19, 25, 2024 Annual #1, hc, 176 pages, 2025, ISBN 1-79950-031-4; tpb, 152 pages, 2025, ISBN 1-79950-033-0)
  - IMPossible (collects #26-31, hc, 144 pages, 2025, ISBN 1-79950-189-2; tpb, 2025, ISBN 1-79950-192-2)
  - Total Eclipso (collects #31-34 and Green Lantern/Green Arrow: World's Finest Special #1, hc, 168 pages, 2025, ISBN 1-79950-526-X; tpb, 2025, ISBN 1-79950-527-8)
  - 20,000 Leagues (collects #35-37, 40-43, hc, 208 pages, 2026, ISBN 1-79950-618-5; tpb, 2026, ISBN 1-79950-619-3)
- Tales from Dark Crisis (hc, 224 pages, 2023, ISBN 1-77951-854-4) includes:
  - Dark Crisis: The Dark Army (framing sequence, with Freddie E. Williams II, anthology one-shot, 2023)
  - Dark Crisis: Big Bang (with Dan Jurgens, one-shot, 2023)
- Lazarus Planet (hc, 336 pages, 2023, ISBN 1-77952-333-5) includes:
  - Lazarus Planet: Alpha (with Riccardo Federici, one-shot, 2023)
  - Lazarus Planet: Omega (with Riccardo Federici and Mike Perkins, one-shot, 2023)
- Shazam!
  - Shazam! vol. 4 #1–9 (with Dan Mora, Goran Sudžuka (#7-8) and Emanuela Lupacchino (#9), 2023–2024)
    - Thunderstruck (collects #1–6, tpb, 136 pages, 2024, ISBN 1-77952-511-7)
  - Knight Terrors: Shazam! #1–2 (with Roger Cruz, 2023) collected in Knight Terrors: Terror Titans (tpb, 176 pages, 1998, ISBN 1-56389-447-5)
- World's Finest: Teen Titans #1–6 (with Emanuela Lupacchino, 2023–2024) collected in World's Finest: Teen Titans (hc, 288 pages, 2024, ISBN 1-77952-568-0)

==== Impact Comics ====
Titles published by DC Comics' Impact imprint include:

- The Shield:
  - The Legend of the Shield #1–12 (with Grant Miehm, 1991–1992)
  - The Web Annual #1: "High Stakes" (with Turner Allen, co-feature, 1992)
- The Comet vol. 2 #1–10, 12–18, Annual #1 (with Tom Lyle, Kevin J. West, Turner Allen (#7, 9, Annual) and Cooper Smith (#17), 1991–1992)
- Impact Christmas Special (anthology, 1991) featured several stories written by Waid:
  - "The Gift of the Magi" (framing sequence, with Carmine Infantino)
  - "Miracle on Farm Road 139" (with Tom Lyle)
  - "Immaculate Deception" (with Grant Miehm)
- The Crusaders #1–4, 8 (co-written by Waid and Brian Augustyn, art by Rags Morales and Jeffrey Moore (#8), 1992)
- Crucible #1–6 (co-written by Waid and Brian Augustyn, art by Chuck Wojtkiewicz, 1993)

==== Amalgam Comics ====
Titles published under Marvel/DC Comics' Amalgam label include:

- The Amalgam Age of Comics Volume 1 (tpb, 160 pages, 1996, ISBN 1-56389-295-2) includes:
  - JLX (co-written by Waid and Gerard Jones, art by Howard Porter, one-shot, 1996)
  - Super-Soldier (with Dave Gibbons, one-shot, 1996)
- The Amalgam Age of Comics Volume 2 (tpb, 160 pages, 1996, ISBN 0-7851-0240-X) includes:
  - Magneto and the Magnetic Men (co-written by Waid and Gerard Jones, art by Jeff Matsuda, one-shot, 1996)
- Return to the Amalgam Age of Comics Volume 1 (tpb, 160 pages, 1997, ISBN 1-56389-382-7) includes:
  - Super-Soldier: Man of War (written and drawn by Dave Gibbons from a plot by Waid and Gibbons, one-shot, 1997)

=== As editor ===
Associate editor:

- On titles edited by Roy Thomas:
  - Secret Origins vol. 2 #23–30 (1988) (Note: The Floronic Man story in issue #23 is co-edited by Waid and Greg Weisman.)
  - Young All-Stars #10–17, Annual #1 (1988) (Note: Issue #17 is co-edited by Waid and Dan Raspler.)
  - Infinity, Inc. #48–53, Annual #2 (1988)
  - Crimson Avenger #1–4 (1988)
- On titles edited by Karen Berger:
  - Who's Who in the Legion of Super-Heroes #1–7 (1988)
  - Wonder Woman vol. 2 #36–40 (1989–1990)

Story editor:

- Tales of the Teen Titans #91 (1988)
- Who's Who Update '88 #1–4 (1988)
- Secret Origins vol. 2 #31–50, Annual #2–3, Special (1988–1990) (Note: Issues #48–50 is co-edited by Waid and Michael Eury.)
- Daily Planet: Special Invasion Edition #1 (1988)
- Christmas with the Super-Heroes #1–2 (1988–1989)
- Action Comics Weekly #636–642 (1989) (Note: Waid only edited the Phantom Lady story in issues #636–641 of this anthology series. Issue #642 is co-edited by Waid and Brian Augustyn.)
- Aquaman Special #1 (1989)
- Kissyfur #1 (1989)
- Doom Patrol vol. 2 #26–32 (1989–1990) (Note: Issue #32 is co-edited by Waid and Art Young.)
- Legion of Super-Heroes vol. 3 #1–6 (1989–1990) (Note: Issue #6 is co-edited by Waid and Michael Eury.)
- Gotham by Gaslight: A Tale of the Batman #1 (1989)

Collected editions:

- Associate editor on collections edited by Mike Gold:
  - The Greatest Batman Stories Ever Told (with Brian Augustyn, hc, 352 pages, 1988, ISBN 0-930289-35-8; tpb, 1989, ISBN 0-446-39123-9)
  - The Greatest Joker Stories Ever Told (with Brian Augustyn, hc, 288 pages, 1988, ISBN 0-930289-36-6; tpb, 1989, ISBN 0-446-39125-5)
  - The Greatest Golden Age Stories Ever Told (with Brian Augustyn and Robert Greenberger, hc, 292 pages, 1990, ISBN 0-930289-57-9)
- Associate editor on collections edited by Richard Bruning:
  - The Private Files of the Shadow (hc, 132 pages, 1989, ISBN 0-930289-37-4)
  - Superman Archives Volume 1 (hc, 280 pages, 1989, ISBN 1-4012-0630-1)
  - Green Arrow: The Longbow Hunters (tpb, 164 pages, 1989, ISBN 0-930289-38-2)
  - Justice League: A New Beginning (tpb, 196 pages, 1989, ISBN 0-930289-40-4)
  - The Art of Walter Simonson (tpb, 212 pages, 1989, ISBN 0-930289-41-2)
  - Hawkman (tpb, 164 pages, 1989, ISBN 0-930289-42-0)
  - Batman: Year Two (tpb, 108 pages, 1990, ISBN 0-930289-49-8)
- Legion of Super-Heroes: The Great Darkness Saga (tpb, 212 pages, 1989, ISBN 0-930289-43-9)
- Secret Origins of the World's Greatest Super-Heroes (tpb, 148 pages, 1990, ISBN 0-930289-50-1)

== Archie Comics ==
Titles published by Archie include:

- Archie's Pals 'n' Gals (with Chris Allan, anthology):
  - "Moose" (in #222, 1991) collected in Archie 1,000-Page Comics Blow-Out (tpb, 1,002 pages, 2015, ISBN 1-62738-945-8)
  - "Duh-Hic" (in #223, 1991) collected in Archie 1,000-Page Comics Celebration (tpb, 1,004 pages, 2014, ISBN 1-61988-956-0)
- Riverdale High #5: "Meet the New Coach" (with Stan Goldberg, anthology, 1991) collected in Archie 1,000-Page Comics Shindig (tpb, 1,004 pages, 2016, ISBN 1-62738-805-2)
- Archie 3000 #16: "Schoofball, You Bet!" (co-written by Waid and Chris Allan, art by Dan Parent, anthology, 1991) collected in Archie 3000 (tpb, 224 pages, 2019, ISBN 1-68255-841-X)
- Veronica #16 (co-written by Waid and Chris Allan, art by Dan Parent, anthology, 1991) collected in Archie and Friends All-Stars Volume 1 (tpb, 96 pages, 2009, ISBN 1-879794-43-8)
- The Fox (with Dean Haspiel):
  - The Fox #1–4 (of 5) (Red Circle, 2013–2014) collected as The Fox: Freak Magnet (tpb, 144 pages, 2014, ISBN 1-936975-93-9)
  - The Fox vol. 2 #1–5 (Dark Circle, 2015) collected as The Fox: Fox Hunt (tpb, 136 pages, 2018, ISBN 1-68255-887-8)
- New Riverdale:
  - Archie vol. 2 (with Fiona Staples (#1–3), Annie Wu (#4), Veronica Fish, Thomas Pitilli (#11–12), Joe Eisma, Pete Woods and Audrey Mok, 2015–2018) collected as:
    - Volume 1 (collects #1–6, tpb, 176 pages, 2016, ISBN 1-62738-867-2)
    - Volume 2 (collects #7–12, tpb, 176 pages, 2016, ISBN 1-62738-798-6)
    - Volume 3 (collects #13–17, tpb, 144 pages, 2017, ISBN 1-68255-993-9)
      - Issues #13–16 are co-written by Waid and Lori Matsumoto.
    - Volume 4 (collects #18–22, tpb, 144 pages, 2017, ISBN 1-68255-970-X)
    - Volume 5 (collects #23–27, tpb, 144 pages, 2018, ISBN 1-68255-929-7)
    - Volume 6 (collects #28–32, tpb, 144 pages, 2018, ISBN 1-68255-869-X)
      - Issues #28–32 are co-written by Waid and Ian Flynn.
  - Jughead vol. 3 #15–16 (co-written by Waid and Ian Flynn, art by Derek Charm, 2017) collected in Jughead Volume 3 (tpb, 144 pages, 2017, ISBN 1-68255-956-4)
- Archie: 1941 #1–5 (co-written by Waid and Brian Augustyn, art by Peter Krause, 2018–2019) collected as Archie: 1941 (tpb, 144 pages, 2019, ISBN 1-68255-823-1)
- Archie: 1955 #1–5 (co-written by Waid and Brian Augustyn, art by Tom Grummett (#1–2), Rick Burchett (#2 and 5), Ray-Anthony Height (#3 and 5), Derek Charm (#4) and Joe Eisma (#5), 2019–2020)

== Marvel Comics ==
Titles published by Marvel include:

- X-Men:
  - Deadpool: Sins of the Past #1–4 (with Ian Churchill, Lee Weeks (#2) and Ken Lashley (#3–4), 1994)
    - Collected in Deadpool Classic Volume 1 (tpb, 264 pages, 2008, ISBN 0-7851-3124-8)
    - Collected in Deadpool and X-Force Omnibus (hc, 872 pages, 2017, ISBN 1-302-90830-8)
  - X-Men: The Age of Apocalypse Omnibus (hc, 1,072 pages, 2012, ISBN 0-7851-5982-7) includes:
    - Uncanny X-Men #320–321 (dialogue; plot by Scott Lobdell, art by Roger Cruz (#320) and Ron Garney (#321), 1995) also collected in X-Men: The Age of Apocalypse Prelude (tpb, 264 pages, 2011, ISBN 0-7851-5508-2)
    - X-Men: Alpha (script by Waid from a plot by Waid and Scott Lobdell, art by Roger Cruz and Steve Epting, one-shot, 1995) also collected in X-Men: The Complete Age of Apocalypse Volume 2 (tpb, 376 pages, 2006, ISBN 0-7851-1874-8)
    - X-Men: Omega (script by Waid from a plot by Waid and Scott Lobdell, art by Roger Cruz, one-shot, 1995) also collected in X-Men: The Complete Age of Apocalypse Volume 4 (tpb, 368 pages, 2006, ISBN 0-7851-2052-1)
  - X-Men vol. 2 (with Jeff Matsuda (#49), Pasqual Ferry (#51) and Andy Kubert; issues #49 and 56 are scripted by Waid from plots by Scott Lobdell, 1996) collected as:
    - X-Men: The Road to Onslaught Volume 2 (includes #49, tpb, 440 pages, 2014, ISBN 0-7851-8830-4)
    - X-Men: The Road to Onslaught Volume 3 (includes #51–52, tpb, 448 pages, 2015, ISBN 0-7851-9005-8)
      - Includes X-Men Unlimited #10 (written by Waid, art by Nick Gnazzo and Frank Toscano, anthology, 1996)
    - X-Men: The Complete Onslaught Epic Volume 1 (includes #53–54, tpb, 256 pages, 2007, ISBN 0-7851-2823-9)
      - Includes the Onslaught: X-Men one-shot (co-written by Waid and Scott Lobdell, art by Pasqual Ferry and Adam Kubert, 1996)
    - X-Men: The Complete Onslaught Epic Volume 3 (includes #55, tpb, 248 pages, 2008, ISBN 0-7851-2825-5)
    - X-Men: The Complete Onslaught Epic Volume 4 (includes #56, tpb, 264 pages, 2009, ISBN 0-7851-2826-3)
      - Includes the Onslaught: Marvel Universe one-shot (co-written by Waid and Scott Lobdell, art by Adam Kubert and Joe Bennett, 1996)
    - X-Men/Avengers: Onslaught Omnibus (includes #53–56, Onslaught: X-Men and Onslaught: Marvel Universe, hc, 1,296 pages, 2015, ISBN 0-7851-9262-X)
  - Deadpool vol. 3 #27: "Continuity Spontinuity" (with John McCrea, co-feature, 2014) collected in Deadpool: The Wedding (tpb, 168 pages, 2014, ISBN 0-7851-8933-5)
  - Marvel #5: "Wolverine" (with Lucio Parillo, anthology, 2021) collected in Marvel (Treasury Edition, 216 pages, 2021, ISBN 1-302-92092-8; tpb, 2022, ISBN 1-302-93413-9)
- Captain America:
  - Captain America: Man without a Country (tpb, 456 pages, 2016, ISBN 0-7851-9510-6) collects:
    - Captain America #444–454 (with Ron Garney, 1995–1996)
    - Captain America: The Legend: "Scenes We Never Saw" (with Dan Jurgens, anthology one-shot, 1996)
  - Captain America vol. 3 (with Ron Garney, Dale Eaglesham (#6–7), Andy Kubert, Doug Braithwaite (#13), Lee Weeks (#18) and Patrick Zircher (#23), 1998–1999) collected as:
    - To Serve and Protect (collects #1–7, tpb, 176 pages, 2002, ISBN 0-7851-5082-X; hc, 192 pages, 2011, ISBN 0-7851-5082-X)
    - American Nightmare (collects #8–13, hc, 248 pages, 2011, ISBN 0-7851-5084-6)
      - Includes Iron Man/Captain America Annual '98 (script by Waid from a plot by Kurt Busiek and Roger Stern, art by Patrick Zircher, 1998)
    - Red Glare (collects #14–19, hc, 200 pages, 2011, ISBN 0-7851-5894-4)
      - Waid asked to remove his name from issue #14 due to heavy editorial interference.
    - Land of the Free (includes #20–23, tpb, 160 pages, 2013, ISBN 0-7851-6753-6)
      - Issue #23 features dialogue by Jay Faerber over story by Waid.
  - Captain America: Sentinel of Liberty #1–6, 8–9, 11–12 (with Ron Garney, Doug Braithwaite, Cully Hamner (#8), Walter A. McDaniel (#11) and Anthony Williams (#11–12), 1998–1999)
    - "The Great Pretender" co-feature in issue #5 is scripted by Brian K. Vaughan from a plot by Waid.
    - The entire 12-issue series is collected as Captain America: Sentinel of Liberty (hc, 360 pages, 2011, ISBN 0-7851-4963-5)
  - Captain America: Red, White & Blue: "American Dream" (with Mike Huddleston, anthology graphic novel, hc, 192 pages, 2002, ISBN 0-7851-1033-X; sc, 2007, ISBN 0-7851-2897-2)
  - Captain America #600: "The Persistence of Memorabilia" (with Dale Eaglesham, co-feature, 2009) collected in Captain America: Road to Reborn (hc, 176 pages, 2009, ISBN 0-7851-4174-X; tpb, 2010, ISBN 0-7851-4175-8)
  - Captain America: Man Out of Time #1–5 (with Jorge Molina and Karl Kesel (#2–3), 2011) collected as Captain America: Man Out of Time (hc, 144 pages, 2011, ISBN 0-7851-5128-1; tpb, 2011, ISBN 0-7851-5129-X)
  - Captain America (with Chris Samnee and Leonardo Romero (#701–704), 2018) collected as:
    - Home of the Brave (collects #695–700, tpb, 136 pages, 2018, ISBN 1-302-90992-4)
    - Promised Land (collects #701–704, tpb, 112 pages, 2018, ISBN 1-302-90993-2)
  - Marvel Comics #1000 (untitled text piece with an illustration by John Cassaday, anthology, 2019) collected in Marvel Comics 1000 (hc, 144 pages, 2020, ISBN 1-302-92137-1)
- Spider-Man:
  - Spider-Man 2099 Special: "Eye Spy" (with Joe St. Pierre, co-feature, 1995) collected in Spider-Man 2099 vs. Venom 2099 (tpb, 280 pages, 2019, ISBN 1-302-91621-1)
  - Spider-Man Team-Up #1: "Double or Nothing" (co-written by Waid and Tom Peyer, art by Ken Lashley, anthology, 1995)
    - Collected in Spider-Man: The Complete Clone Saga Epic Volume 5 (tpb, 472 pages, 2011, ISBN 0-7851-5009-9)
    - Collected in Spider-Man: The Clone Saga Omnibus Volume 2 (hc, 1,288 pages, 2017, ISBN 1-302-90798-0)
  - Marvel Holiday Special 1996: "Not a Creature Was Stirring" (with Pat Olliffe, anthology one-shot, 1996)
  - Spider-Man: House of M #1–5 (with Salvador Larroca, 2005)
    - Collected as Spider-Man: House of M (tpb, 120 pages, 2006, ISBN 0-7851-1753-9)
    - Collected in House of M: Spider-Man, Fantastic Four and X-Men (hc, 344 pages, 2009, ISBN 0-7851-3881-1)
  - Spider-Man Family #7: "Looter's Quest" (co-written by Waid and Todd Dezago, art by Karl Kesel, anthology, 2008) collected in Spider-Man Family: Itsy-Bitsy Battles (tpb, 104 pages, 2008, ISBN 0-7851-2988-X)
  - The Amazing Spider-Man:
    - New Ways to Die (hc, 192 pages, 2009, ISBN 0-7851-3217-1; tpb, 2009, ISBN 0-7851-3244-9) includes:
      - "Fifth Stage" (with Adi Granov, co-feature in #568, 2008)
      - "Lo, There Shall Come, This Man... This Candidate!" (with Pat Olliffe, co-feature in #573, 2008)
    - Death and Dating (hc, 184 pages, 2009, ISBN 0-7851-3394-1; tpb, 2010, ISBN 0-7851-3418-2) includes:
      - "Unscheduled Stop" (with Marcos Martín, in #578–579, 2009)
      - "Platonic" (with Barry Kitson, in #583, 2009)
    - 24/7 (hc, 176 pages, 2009, ISBN 0-7851-3396-8; tpb, 2010, ISBN 0-7851-3420-4) includes:
      - "24/7" (with Mike McKone and Barry Kitson (#594), in #592–594, 2009)
    - Died in Your Arms Tonight (hc, 192 pages, 2009, ISBN 0-7851-4459-5; tpb, 2010, ISBN 0-7851-4485-4) includes:
      - "My Brother's Son" (with Colleen Doran, co-feature in #600, 2009)
      - "No Place Like Home" (with Mario Alberti, in #601, 2009)
    - The Gauntlet Volume 1 (hc, 176 pages, 2010, ISBN 0-7851-4264-9; tpb, 2010, ISBN 0-7851-3871-4) includes:
      - "Power to the People!" (with Paul Azaceta, in #612–614, 2010)
    - The Gauntlet Volume 3 (hc, 136 pages, 2010, ISBN 0-7851-4611-3; tpb, 2010, ISBN 0-7851-4612-1) includes:
      - "Scavenging" (co-written by Waid and Tom Peyer, art by Paul Azaceta, in #623–624, 2010)
    - Origin of the Species (hc, 232 pages, 2011, ISBN 0-7851-4621-0; tpb, 2011, ISBN 0-7851-4622-9) includes:
      - "Origin of the Species" (with Paul Azaceta, in #642–646, 2010)
      - "J. Jonah Jameson: The Musical" (with Paul Azaceta, co-feature in #647, 2010)
  - Peter Parker: Unemployed (co-written by Waid and Tom Peyer, art by Todd Nauck, free digital mini-comic, 2010)
    - First published in print as a co-feature in The Amazing Spider-Man #628 (2010)
    - Collected in The Amazing Spider-Man: The Gauntlet Volume 4 (hc, 152 pages, 2010, ISBN 0-7851-4613-X; tpb, 2011, ISBN 0-7851-4614-8)
  - The Amazing Spider-Man: Family Business (co-written by Waid and James Robinson, art by Gabriele Dell'Otto and Werther Dell'Edera, graphic novel, hc, 112 pages, 2014, ISBN 0-7851-8440-6; sc, 2018, ISBN 0-7851-8441-4)
- The Avengers:
  - The Avengers (with Mike Wieringo (#400) and Mike Deodato, Jr., 1996) collected as:
    - X-Men: The Complete Onslaught Epic Volume 1 (includes #400–401, tpb, 256 pages, 2007, ISBN 0-7851-2823-9)
    - X-Men: The Complete Onslaught Epic Volume 3 (includes #402, tpb, 248 pages, 2008, ISBN 0-7851-2825-5)
  - All-New, All-Different Avengers (hc, 424 pages, 2017, ISBN 1-302-90409-4) collects:
    - Free Comic Book Day 2015: Avengers (with Mahmud Asrar, one-shot, 2015)
    - The Avengers vol. 6 #0: "Eidetic" (with Mahmud Asrar, co-feature, 2015)
    - All-New, All-Different Avengers #1–15, Annual #1 (with Adam Kubert and Mahmud Asrar, 2016)
    - Free Comic Book Day 2016: Civil War II: "Buzzed" (with Alan Davis, co-feature in one-shot, 2016)
  - The Avengers vol. 6 (with Mike del Mundo, Barry Kitson, Phil Noto (#7–8), Jesús Saiz (#672 and 674) and Paco Diaz + Javier Pina (#673); issues #7–8 are co-written by Waid and Jeremy Whitley, 2017–2018) collected as:
    - Unleashed — Kang War One (collects #1–5, tpb, 144 pages, 2017, ISBN 1-302-90611-9)
    - Four (collects #1.1–5.1, tpb, 112 pages, 2017, ISBN 1-302-90261-X)
    - Unleashed — Secret Empire (collects #6–11, tpb, 136 pages, 2017, ISBN 1-302-90612-7)
    - Avengers/Champions: Worlds Collide (collects #672–674 and Champions vol. 2 #13–15, tpb, 136 pages, 2017, ISBN 1-302-90613-5)
    - No Surrender (collects #675–690, hc, 352 pages, 2018, ISBN 1-302-91145-7; tpb, 2018, ISBN 1-302-91146-5)
      - Starting with issue #675, the series changed its format to a weekly title co-written by Waid, Al Ewing and Jim Zubkavich, drawn by Pepe Larraz, Kim Jacinto, Paco Medina and Sean Izaakse (#682)
      - The following year, Marvel released a "spiritual sequel" by the same writing team in the form of a weekly 10-issue limited series that introduced Conan the Barbarian into the Marvel Universe:
        - Avengers: No Road Home #1–10 (with Paco Medina, Sean Izaakse and Carlo Barberi (#8), 2019) collected as Avengers: No Road Home (tpb, 256 pages, 2019, ISBN 1-302-91485-5)
- Ka-Zar vol. 3 (with Andy Kubert, John Cassaday (#-1), Pino Rinaldi (#6), Louis Small, Jr. (#12) and Aaron Lopresti (#13), 1997–1998) collected as:
  - Volume 1 (collects #1–7 and -1, tpb, 208 pages, 2011, ISBN 0-7851-4353-X)
    - Issue #-1 is scripted by Andy Jozefowicz from a plot by Waid and Todd Dezago.
    - Includes the Ka-Zar short story (art by Andy Kubert) from Tales of the Marvel Universe (anthology one-shot, 1997)
  - Volume 2 (includes 8–14, tpb, 216 pages, 2012, ISBN 0-7851-5992-4)
- Fantastic Four:
  - Fantastic Four (with Mike Wieringo, Mark Buckingham (vol. 3 #65–66), Casey Jones (#501–502), Howard Porter (#503–508) and Paco Medina (#514–516); issues #514–516 are co-written by Waid and Karl Kesel, 2002–2005) collected as:
    - Ultimate Collection: Fantastic Four by Waid and Wieringo Volume 1 (collects vol. 3 #60–66 and The Avengers #400, tpb, 208 pages, 2011, ISBN 0-7851-5655-0)
    - Ultimate Collection: Fantastic Four by Waid and Wieringo Volume 2 (collects vol. 3 #67–70 and 500–502, tpb, 200 pages, 2011, ISBN 0-7851-5658-5)
    - Ultimate Collection: Fantastic Four by Waid and Wieringo Volume 3 (collects #503–513, tpb, 272 pages, 2011, ISBN 0-7851-5657-7)
    - Ultimate Collection: Fantastic Four by Waid and Wieringo Volume 4 (collects #514–524, tpb, 256 pages, 2011, ISBN 0-7851-5661-5)
    - Fantastic Four by Waid and Wieringo Omnibus (collects vol. 3 #60–70 and 500–524, hc, 896 pages, 2018, ISBN 1-302-91382-4)
  - Marvel Comics Presents vol. 3 #2: "Liftoff" (with Djibril Morissette-Phan, anthology, 2019) collected in Tales through the Marvel Universe (tpb, 216 pages, 2020, ISBN 1-302-91746-3)
  - Invisible Woman #1–5 (with Mattia de Iulis, 2019–2020) collected as Invisible Woman: Partners in Crime (tpb, 112 pages, 2020, ISBN 1-302-91697-1)
  - Fantastic Four: Antithesis #1–4 (with Neal Adams, 2020–2021) collected as Fantastic Four: Antithesis (Treasury Edition, 144 pages, 2021, ISBN 1-302-92863-5; tpb, 2023, ISBN 1-302-91996-2)
  - Fantastic Four vol. 6 #35: "Stars" (with Paul Renaud, co-feature, 2021) collected in Fantastic Four: The Bride of Doom (tpb, 192 pages, 2021, ISBN 1-302-92049-9)
- Wha... Huh? (with Jim Mahfood, among other writers, one-shot, 2005) collected in Secret Wars Too (tpb, 208 pages, 2016, ISBN 1-302-90211-3)
- Doctor Strange:
  - Strange vol. 2 #1–4 (with Emma Ríos, 2010) collected as Strange: The Doctor is Out (tpb, 104 pages, 2010, ISBN 0-7851-4425-0)
  - Doctor Strange vol. 5 (with Jesús Saiz, Javier Pina (#6–8, 11), Andres Guinaldo (#7–8), Kevin Nowlan + Butch Guice + Daniel Acuña (#10) and Barry Kitson, 2018–2019) collected as:
    - Across the Universe (collects #1–5, tpb, 112 pages, 2018, ISBN 1-302-91233-X)
    - Remittance (collects #6–11, tpb, 152 pages, 2019, ISBN 1-302-91234-8)
    - Herald (collects #12–17, tpb, 136 pages, 2019, ISBN 1-302-91457-X)
    - The Choice (collects #18–20, tpb, 112 pages, 2020, ISBN 1-302-91458-8)
  - Doctor Strange: Surgeon Supreme #1–6 (with Kev Walker, 2020)
    - Issue #7 was solicited for a June 2020 release, delayed due to the COVID-19 pandemic, and ultimately cancelled.
    - Collected as Doctor Strange: Surgeon Supreme — Under the Knife (tpb, 136 pages, 2020, ISBN 1-302-92105-3)
- Ruse vol. 2 #1–4 (with Mirco Pierfederici, CrossGen, 2011) collected as Ruse: The Victorian Guide to Murder (tpb, 96 pages, 2011, ISBN 0-7851-5586-4)
- Daredevil (with Paolo Rivera, Marcos Martín (vol. 3 #1, 4–6), Kano (vol. 3 #8), Khoi Pham (vol. 3 #10.1 and 13), Marco Checchetto (vol. 3 #11), Chris Samnee, Mike Allred (vol. 3 #17) and Javier Rodríguez (vol. 3 #28–29, 34; vol. 4 #1.50, 6–7), 2011–2015) collected as:
  - Daredevil by Mark Waid Volume 1 (collects vol. 3 #1–10 and 10.1, hc, 288 pages, 2013, ISBN 0-7851-6806-0)
    - Includes The Amazing Spider-Man #677 (written by Waid, art by Emma Ríos, 2012)
  - Daredevil by Mark Waid Volume 2 (collects vol. 3 #11–21, hc, 296 pages, 2014, ISBN 0-7851-8479-1)
    - Includes Avenging Spider-Man #6 and The Punisher vol. 9 #10 (co-written by Waid and Greg Rucka, art by Marco Checchetto, 2012)
  - Daredevil by Mark Waid Volume 3 (collects vol. 3 #22–36 and Indestructible Hulk #9–10, hc, 384 pages, 2014, ISBN 0-7851-9023-6)
  - Daredevil by Mark Waid Volume 4 (collects vol. 4 #1–10 and 1.50, hc, 312 pages, 2016, ISBN 0-7851-9534-3)
    - Includes the 4-issue limited series Daredevil: Road Warrior (written by Waid, art by Peter Krause, 2014)
  - Daredevil by Mark Waid Volume 5 (collects vol. 4 #11–18 and 15.1, hc, 216 pages, 2016, ISBN 1-302-90060-9)
  - Daredevil by Mark Waid Omnibus Volume 1 (collects vol. 3 #1–27, 10.1, The Amazing Spider-Man #677, Avenging Spider-Man #6 and The Punisher vol. 9 #10, hc, 728 pages, 2017, ISBN 1-302-90426-4)
  - Daredevil by Mark Waid Omnibus Volume 2 (collects vol. 3 #28–36, vol. 4 #1–18, 1.50, 15.1, Daredevil: Road Warrior #1–4 and Indestructible Hulk #9–10, hc, 768 pages, 2018, ISBN 1-302-90898-7)
- Avengers vs. X-Men Infinite #1 (with Stuart Immonen) — Infinite #6 (with Carlo Barberi) — Infinite #10 (with Reilly Brown, digital, 2012) collected in Avengers vs. X-Men (hc, 568 pages, 2012, ISBN 0-7851-6317-4)
- Hulk:
  - Indestructible Hulk (with Leinil Francis Yu, Walter Simonson (#6–8), Matteo Scalera (#9–13), Kim Jacinto (#13–15), Mahmud Asrar (#14 and 16), Miguel Sepulveda (#17–18) and Joe Bennett (#19–20), 2012–2014) collected as:
    - Agent of S.H.I.E.L.D. (collects #1–5, hc, 136 pages, 2014, ISBN 0-7851-6831-1; tpb, 2014, ISBN 0-7851-6647-5)
    - Gods and Monster (collects #6–10, hc, 144 pages, 2013, ISBN 0-7851-6832-X; tpb, 2014, ISBN 0-7851-6648-3)
    - S.M.A.S.H. Time (collects #11–15, hc, 136 pages, 2014, ISBN 0-7851-8884-3; tpb, 2014, ISBN 0-7851-8885-1)
    - Humanity Bomb (collects #16–20, hc, 144 pages, 2014, ISBN 0-7851-5480-9; tpb, 2015, ISBN 0-7851-8949-1)
    - Indestructible Hulk by Mark Waid: The Complete Collection (collects #1–20, tpb, 504 pages, 2017, ISBN 1-302-90800-6)
  - Hulk vol. 2 #1–4 (with Mark Bagley, 2014) collected in Hulk by Mark Waid and Gerry Duggan: The Complete Collection (tpb, 504 pages, 2018, ISBN 1-302-91319-0)
- Age of Ultron #10.AI (with André Lima Araújo, 2013)
  - Collected in Age of Ultron (hc, 504 pages, 2013, ISBN 0-7851-5565-1)
  - Collected in Age of Ultron Companion (tpb, 200 pages, 2014, ISBN 0-7851-8485-6)
- Original Sin:
  - Original Sin #0 (with Jim Cheung and Paco Medina, 2014) collected in Original Sin (hc, 392 pages, 2014, ISBN 0-7851-9069-4; tpb, 240 pages, 2015, ISBN 0-7851-5491-4)
  - Original Sin #3.1–3.4: "Hulk vs. Iron Man" (co-written by Waid and Kieron Gillen, art by Mark Bagley and Luke Ross, 2014)
    - Collected as Original Sin: Hulk vs. Iron Man (tpb, 104 pages, 2014, ISBN 0-7851-9156-9)
    - Collected in Original Sin Companion (hc, 968 pages, 2015, ISBN 0-7851-9212-3)
- S.H.I.E.L.D. vol. 3 (with Carlos Pacheco (#1), Humberto Ramos (#2), Alan Davis (#3), Chris Sprouse (#4), Mike Choi (#5), Paul Renaud (#6), Greg Smallwood (#7), Paco Medina (#8), Lee Ferguson (#9), Evan Shaner (#10), Howard Chaykin (#11) and Joe Bennett (#12), 2015) collected as:
  - Perfect Bullets (collects #1–6, tpb, 144 pages, 2015, ISBN 0-7851-9362-6)
  - The Man Called D.E.A.T.H. (collects #7–12, tpb, 136 pages, 2016, ISBN 0-7851-9363-4)
- Star Wars: Princess Leia #1–5 (with Terry Dodson, 2015) collected as Star Wars: Princess Leia (tpb, 120 pages, 2015, ISBN 0-7851-9317-0)
- Black Widow vol. 7 #1–12 (with Chris Samnee, 2016–2017) collected as Black Widow by Waid and Samnee: The Complete Collection (tpb, 504 pages, 2020, ISBN 1-302-92129-0)
- Champions vol. 2 (with Humberto Ramos, 2016–2018) collected as:
  - Because the World Still Needs Heroes (collects #1–12, tpb, 296 pages, 2019, ISBN 1-302-91794-3)
  - Worlds Collide (collects #13–18 and The Avengers #672–674, tpb, 200 pages, 2021, ISBN 1-302-92326-9)
- Ant-Man and the Wasp #1–5 (with Javier Garrón, 2018) collected as Ant-Man and the Wasp: Lost and Found (tpb, 112 pages, 2018, ISBN 0-7851-9462-2)
- Marvel Comics Presents vol. 3 #2: "This Man, This Gorilla" (with Djibril Morissette-Phan, anthology, 2019) collected in Tales through the Marvel Universe (tpb, 216 pages, 2020, ISBN 1-302-91746-3)
- History of the Marvel Universe #1–6 (with Javier Rodríguez, 2019–2020) collected as History of the Marvel Universe (Treasury Edition, 232 pages, 2020, ISBN 1-302-91774-9; tpb, 2021, ISBN 1-302-92829-5)
- Secret Warps: Soldier Supreme Annual: "Symbol of Liberty" (with Alex Lins, co-feature, 2019) collected in Secret Warps (tpb, 168 pages, 2019, ISBN 1-302-91776-5)
- Marvels Snapshots: Captain Marvel (with Claire Roe, one-shot, 2021) collected in Marvels Snapshots (hc, 264 pages, 2021, ISBN 1-302-92496-6; tpb, 2023, ISBN 1-302-93415-5)
- Fallen Friend: The Death of Ms. Marvel: "Champion" (with Humberto Ramos, co-feature, 2023)
- Marvel Age #1000: "Machine Learning" (with Alessandro Cappuccio, co-feature, 2023)

== Image Comics ==
Titles published by Image include:

- Wildstorm Rarities: "Thinking Big" (co-written by Waid and H. K. Proger, art by Mat Broome, anthology one-shot, 1994)
- Empire (with Barry Kitson, published under the short-lived Gorilla imprint and later continued under DC Comics and Thrillbent):
  - Shockrockets #1: "A Walk in the Park" (co-feature, 2000)
  - Empire #1–2 (2000)
- Hunter-Killer (co-created by Waid and Marc Silvestri; written by Waid; published by Top Cow):
  - Hunter-Killer #0–12 (with Marc Silvestri, Eric Basaldua (#7–8) and Kenneth Rocafort, 2005–2007) collected as Hunter-Killer (tpb, 336 pages, 2008, ISBN 1-58240-647-2)
  - CyberForce/Hunter-Killer #1–5 (with Kenneth Rocafort, 2009–2010) collected as CyberForce/Hunter-Killer (tpb, 160 pages, 2010, ISBN 1-60706-104-X)
- City of Heroes #1–3 (with David Nakayama, Top Cow, 2005) collected in City of Heroes (tpb, 160 pages, 2005, ISBN 1-58240-545-X)
- Jersey Gods #3–4, 6–7: "Tales from the Great War" (with Joe Infurnari, co-feature, 2009)
- Liberty Annual '11: "Being Normal" (with Jeff Lemire, anthology, 2011) collected in CBLDF Presents: Liberty (hc, 216 pages, 2014, ISBN 1-60706-937-7; tpb, 2016, ISBN 1-60706-996-2)

== CrossGen ==
Titles published by CrossGen include:

- Sigil (with Scot Eaton, Paul Pelletier (#15) and Andrea Di Vito (#17), 2001–2002) collected as:
  - The Marked Man (includes #11–14, tpb, 208 pages, 2002, ISBN 1-931484-07-4)
    - Issue #11 is written by Barbara Kesel and drawn by Scot Eaton, with Waid credited for "plot assist".
    - Also collects CrossGen Chronicles #4 (written by Waid, art by George Pérez, anthology, 2001)
  - The Lizard God (includes #15–19, tpb, 160 pages, 2002, ISBN 1-931484-28-7)
- Crux:
  - Crux (with Steve Epting, Paul Pelletier (#6) and Andy Smith (#11), 2001–2002) collected as:
    - Atlantis Rising (collects #1–6, tpb, 176 pages, 2002, ISBN 1-931484-14-7)
    - Test of Time (collects #7–12, tpb, 160 pages, 2002, ISBN 1-931484-36-8)
  - CrossGen Chronicles #8 (with Esteban Maroto, anthology, 2002)
  - Crux #16: "The Dig, Part One" (co-written by Waid and Chuck Dixon, art by Rick Magyar, co-feature, 2002)
- Ruse (with Butch Guice, Jeff Johnson (#5) and Paul Ryan (#11), 2001–2002) collected as:
  - Enter the Detective (includes #1–6, tpb, 160 pages, 2002, ISBN 1-931484-19-8)
  - The Silent Partner (includes #7–12, tpb, 160 pages, 2003, ISBN 1-931484-48-1)
    - Issues #10–12 are scripted by Scott Beatty from a plot by Waid and Beatty.
- Negation: BOHICA! (tpb, 192 pages, 2002, ISBN 1-931484-30-9) includes:
  - Negation Prequel (co-written by Waid and Tony Bedard, art by Paul Pelletier, one-shot, 2001)
  - Negation #1–2 (co-written by Waid and Tony Bedard, art by Paul Pelletier, 2002)
- Saurians: Unnatural Selection #1–2 (co-written by Waid and Tony Bedard, art by Andrea Di Vito, 2002)

== Boom! Studios ==
Titles published by Boom! Studios include:

- Zombie Tales Volume 1 (tpb, 144 pages, 2007, ISBN 1-934506-02-8) includes:
  - Zombie Tales: "If You're So Smart..." (with Carlos Magno, anthology one-shot, 2005)
  - Zombie Tales: Oblivion: "Luther" (with Mark Badger, anthology one-shot, 2005)
- Potter's Field (tpb, 112 pages, 2010, ISBN 1-934506-60-5) collected as:
  - Potter's Field #1–3 (with Paul Azaceta, 2007)
  - Potter's Field: Stone Cold (with Paul Azaceta, one-shot, 2009)
- Cthulhu Tales #4: "In the Pi of the Beholder" (with Chee Yang Ong, anthology, 2008) collected in Cthulhu Tales: The Whisper of Madness (tpb, 112 pages, 2009, ISBN 1-934506-51-6)
- The Incredibles:
  - The Incredibles vol. 2 #1–4 (with Marcio Takara, 2009) collected as The Incredibles: Family Matters (hc, 128 pages, 2009, ISBN 1-60886-525-8; tpb, 2009, ISBN 1-934506-83-4)
  - The Incredibles vol. 3 (co-written by Waid and Landry Q. Walker, art by Marcio Takara and Ramanda Kamarga, 2009–2010) collected as:
    - City of Incredibles (collects #0–3, hc, 112 pages, 2010, ISBN 1-60886-529-0; tpb, 2010, ISBN 1-60886-503-7)
    - Revenge from Below (collects #4–7, tpb, 112 pages, 2010, ISBN 1-60886-518-5)
- Irredeemable (with Peter Krause, Diego Barreto, Eduardo Barreto (#29) and Damian Couceiro (#30–31, 34), 2009–2012) collected as:
  - Volume 1 (collects #1–4, tpb, 112 pages, 2009, ISBN 1-934506-90-7)
  - Volume 2 (collects #5–8, tpb, 112 pages, 2010, ISBN 1-60886-000-0)
  - Volume 3 (collects #9–12, tpb, 112 pages, 2010, ISBN 1-60886-008-6)
  - Volume 4 (collects #13–15, tpb, 112 pages, 2010, ISBN 1-60886-029-9)
    - Includes Irredeemable Special (written by Waid, art by Paul Azaceta, Emma Ríos and Howard Chaykin, 2009)
  - Volume 5 (collects #16–19, tpb, 128 pages, 2011, ISBN 1-60886-040-X)
  - Volume 6 (collects #20–23, tpb, 128 pages, 2011, ISBN 1-60886-054-X)
  - Volume 7 (collects #24–27, tpb, 128 pages, 2011, ISBN 1-60886-055-8)
  - Volume 8 (collects #28–31, tpb, 128 pages, 2012, ISBN 1-60886-082-5)
  - Volume 9 (collects #32–33 and Incorruptible #25–26, tpb, 128 pages, 2012, ISBN 1-60886-083-3)
  - Volume 10 (collects #34–37, tpb, 128 pages, 2012, ISBN 1-60886-275-5)
  - Omnibus (collects #1–37, Irredeemable Special and Incorruptible #25–26, tpb, 896 pages, 2020, ISBN 1-68415-546-0)
- Incorruptible (with Jean Diaz, Horacio Domingues (#5–10), Marcio Takara and Damian Couceiro (#28–30), 2009–2012) collected as:
  - Volume 1 (collects #1–4, 128 pages, tpb, 2010, ISBN 1-60886-015-9)
  - Volume 2 (collects #5–8, 128 pages, tpb, 2010, ISBN 1-60886-028-0)
  - Volume 3 (collects #9–12, 128 pages, tpb, 2011, ISBN 1-60886-039-6)
  - Volume 4 (collects #13–16, 128 pages, tpb, 2011, ISBN 1-60886-056-6)
  - Volume 5 (collects #17–20, 128 pages, tpb, 2011, ISBN 1-60886-057-4)
  - Volume 6 (collects #21–24, 128 pages, tpb, 2012, ISBN 1-60886-084-1)
  - Volume 7 (collects #27–30, 128 pages, tpb, 2012, ISBN 1-60886-085-X)
  - Omnibus (collects #1–30 and Irredeemable #32–33, tpb, 720 pages, 2020, ISBN 1-68415-609-2)
- The Unknown Omnibus (tpb, 208 pages, 2019, ISBN 1-68415-467-7) collects:
  - The Unknown #1–4 (with Minck Oosterveer, 2009) also collected as The Unknown Volume 1 (hc, 112 pages, 2010, ISBN 1-934506-97-4; tpb, 2010, ISBN 1-60886-043-4)
  - The Unknown: The Devil Made Flesh #1–4 (with Minck Oosterveer, 2009) also collected as The Unknown Volume 2 (tpb, 112 pages, 2011, ISBN 1-60886-046-9)
- The Traveler (co-created by Waid and Stan Lee; written by Waid with Tom Peyer as the co-writer in issues #5–12, art by Chad Hardin, 2010–2011) collected as:
  - Volume 1 (collects #1–4, 128 pages, tpb, 2011, ISBN 1-60886-050-7)
  - Volume 2 (collects #5–8, 128 pages, tpb, 2011, ISBN 1-60886-062-0)
  - Volume 3 (collects #9–12, 128 pages, tpb, 2012, ISBN 1-60886-063-9)
- Steed and Mrs. Peel: A Very Civil Armageddon (tpb, 128 pages, 2013, ISBN 1-60886-306-9) collects:
  - Steed and Mrs. Peel #0: "The Dead Future" (with Steve Bryant, 2012)
  - Steed and Mrs. Peel vol. 2 #1–3 (script by Caleb Monroe from a story by Waid, art by Will Sliney, 2012)
- Strange Fruit #1–4 (with J. G. Jones, 2015–2016) collected as Strange Fruit (hc, 128 pages, 2017, ISBN 1-60886-872-9)

== Thrillbent Comics ==
Titles published by Thrillbent, a platform for digital comics co-founded by Waid, include:

- Luther (with Jeremy Rock, one-shot, 2012)
- Insufferable (with Peter Krause):
  - Insufferable #1–34 (2012)
    - Published in print by IDW Publishing as Insufferable #1–8 (2015)
    - The print version was subsequently collected by IDW Publishing as:
      - Insufferable Volume 1 (tpb, 120 pages, 2016, ISBN 1-63140-511-X)
      - Insufferable Volume 2 (tpb, 104 pages, 2016, ISBN 1-63140-609-4)
  - Insufferable vol. 2 #1–32 (2013)
    - Published in print by IDW Publishing as Insufferable: On the Road #1–6 (2016)
    - Collected as Insufferable: On the Road (tpb, 128 pages, 2016, ISBN 1-63140-734-1)
  - Insufferable vol. 3 #1–20 (2014–2015)
    - Published in print by IDW Publishing as Insufferable: Home Field Advantage #1–4 (2016–2017)
    - Collected as Insufferable: Home Field Advantage (tpb, 104 pages, 2017, ISBN 1-63140-878-X)
- Cthulhu Calls (Waid's script form 2004, storyboarded and annotated by Yves Bigerel, 2012)
- Pax Arena #1–8 (written by J. L. Mast, drawn by Geoffo, 2012)
- City of the Dead #1–2 (written by Karl Kesel, drawn by Ron Randall, 2012)
- Recipe for Disaster (written and drawn by Erik Lundy, one-shot, 2013)
- The Pandas Show (written by J. L. Mast, drawn by Mast and Geoffo):
  - The Walking Pandas #1–2 (2013)
  - The Pandas Show (one-shot, 2013)
- You Think You're So Smart (with Pat Lewis, one-shot, 2013)
- Clown Stories (written by Tom Peyer, drawn by Chee):
  - Clown in the Mirror (one-shot, 2013)
  - Clown Party (one-shot, 2013)
- Arcanum #1–16 (written by John Rogers, drawn by Todd Harris, 2013)
- The Eighth Seal #1–9 (written by James Tynion IV, drawn by Jeremy Rock, 2013–2015)
- The Damnation of Charlie Wormwood (co-written by Christina Blanch and Chris Carr, drawn by Chee):
  - The Damnation of Charlie Wormwood #1–28 (2013)
  - The Damnation of Charlie Wormwood vol. 2 #1–16 (2014)
- The Endling (written by Jonathan Larsen, drawn by Cecilia Latella):
  - The Endling #1–20 (2013)
  - The Endling vol. 2 #0–20 (2014)
- Moth City (written and drawn by Tim Gibson):
  - Moth City Season One #1–19 (2013)
  - Moth City Season Two #1–14 (2013–2014)
- Prodigal #1–11 (written by Geoffrey Thorne, drawn by Todd Harris, 2013)
- Albert the Alien (written by Trevor Mueller, drawn by Gabriel Bautista):
  - Albert the Alien #1–8 (2013–2014)
  - Albert the Alien vol. 2 #1–9 (2014–2015)
  - Albert the Alien: Using the Hall Pass (one-shot, 2014)
  - Albert the Alien Goes to the Movies (one-shot, 2014)
  - Albert the Alien: Origins (one-shot, 2014)
  - Albert the Alien: Cat Encounters (one-shot, 2014)
  - Albert the Alien: Halloween Misadventures (one-shot, 2014)
  - Albert the Alien: Earth (Mis)Adventures (one-shot, 2014)
  - Albert the Alien vol. 3 #1–14 (2015–2016)
- Mini Comics Included (anthology):
  - Literary Commandos (co-written by Steve Seeley and Michael Moreci, drawn by Paul Tucker, one-shot, 2013)
  - Superbeasts (written by Tim Seeley, drawn by Clint Hilinski, one-shot, 2013)
  - The Omega Family #1–2 (co-written by Steve Seeley and Michael Moreci, drawn by Paul Tucker (#1) and Tom Scioli (#2), 2013–2014)
  - Deadstar Divas (written by Tim Seeley, drawn by Sean Dove, one-shot, 2013)
  - Prime-8s (co-written by Steve Seeley and Michael Moreci, drawn by Brent Schoonover and Kyle Latino, one-shot, 2013)
  - Warlords of Wor #1–3 (co-written by Brandon Michael Barker and Eric Scot Lemons, drawn by Cory Hamscher (1), Brian Level (#2) and Tom Scioli (#3), 2013)
  - Colt Noble (written by Tim Seeley, drawn by Clint Hilinski, one-shot, 2013)
- In the Pi of the Beholder (with Dennis Culver, one-shot, 2013)
- Valentine #1–71 (written by Alex de Campi, drawn by Christine Larsen, 2013–2015)
- Varney the Vampire #1–2 (written by Scott Massino, drawn by Scott Kolins, 2014)
- Empire vol. 3 #1–21 (with Barry Kitson, 2014–2015) published in print by IDW Publishing as Empire: Uprising #1–4 (2015)
  - Three more print issues of Empire: Uprising were solicited before the digital series was put on indefinite hiatus.
  - The print version was collected by IDW Publishing as Empire: Uprising Volume 1 (tpb, 104 pages, 2015, ISBN 1-63140-441-5)
- The House in the Wall #1–11 (co-written by James Tynion IV and Noah J. Yuenkel, drawn by Eryk Donovan, 2014)
- Motorcycle Samurai #0–4 and 2014 San Diego Comic-Con Special (written and drawn by Chris Sheridan, 2014)
- Everstar #1–12 (written by Becky Tinker, drawn by Joie Brown, 2014)
- Aw Yeah Comics! #1–6 (written and drawn by Art Baltazar and Franco Aureliani, 2014)
- Santa Claus: Private Eye #1–12 (written by Jeremy Bernstein, drawn by Michael Dorman, 2014)
- Ninjasaur #1–4 (written and drawn by Jason Horn, 2015)
- Stiletto #1–3 (written and drawn by Palle Schmidt, 2015)
- The Best Thing #1–12 (written by Seanan McGuire, drawn by Erica Henderson, 2015)
- Strangers in Paradise (digital version of the series previously published in print; written and drawn by Terry Moore):
  - Strangers in Paradise #1–3 (2015)
  - Strangers in Paradise vol. 2 #1–13 (2015)
  - Strangers in Paradise vol. 3 #1–32 (2015–2016)
- Spacebat #1–6 (written and drawn by Chris Sheridan, 2015)
- Johnny Zombie Christmas (written by Karl Kesel, drawn by David Hahn, one-shot, 2015)
- 4 Seconds (written by Paul O'Connor, drawn by Karl Kesel, graphic novel, 2016)
- Like Giants (with Jason Muhr, one-shot, 2016)

== Other publishers ==
Titles published by various comics publishers include:

- Acclaim:
  - X-O Manowar vol. 2 #1–6 (co-written by Waid and Brian Augustyn, art by Sean Chen and Scot Eaton (#5–6), 1997)
    - Issues #7–13 are written by Brian Augustyn and drawn by Scot Eaton, with Waid credited as "story consultant".
  - Operation: Stormbreaker (co-written by Waid and Brian Augustyn, art by Doug Braithwaite, one-shot, 1997)
  - Solar, Man of the Atom: Hell on Earth #2 (plot assist; written by Christopher Priest, drawn by Patrick Zircher, 1998)
- Event:
  - Ash (co-written by Waid and Brian Augustyn, art by Humberto Ramos):
    - Ash #½ (untitled six-page story on pages 7–12, Wizard, 1997)
    - Ash: Cinder and Smoke #1–6 (1997)
  - Painkiller Jane (co-written by Waid and Brian Augustyn, art by Rick Leonardi):
    - Painkiller Jane #1–5 (1997) collected as Essential Painkiller Jane (tpb, 216 pages, Dynamite, 2007, ISBN 1-933305-97-5)
    - Vampirella/Painkiller Jane: "Miss Hemoglobin 1998" (one-shot, Harris, 1998)
- Gatecrasher (script by Waid from a plot by Waid and Jimmy Palmiotti, art by Amanda Conner, Black Bull):
  - Gatecrasher: Ring of Fire #1–4 (2000) collected as Gatecrasher: Ring of Fire (tpb, 96 pages, 2000, ISBN 0-9672489-1-4)
  - Gatecrasher #1–6 (2000–2001)
- Occupational Hazards #1: "Leave Room for Balloons" (script by Rick Beckley from a story by Waid, art by Hal Saville, anthology, CD Comics, 2000)
- Writer's Block 2003 (untitled six-page segment, with David Miller, anthology one-shot, 2003) collected in The Writer's Block (tpb, 128 pages, CreateSpace, 2011, ISBN 1-4662-6026-2)
- Voltron: Defender of the Universe vol. 3 #10–11: "The Origin of Emperor Zarkon" (with Clément Sauvé (#10) and Kalman Andrasofszky (#11), co-feature, Devil's Due, 2004)
- Dark Horse:
  - BMWFilms.com's The Hire #3: "Hijacked" (with Claude St. Aubin, anthology, 2005) collected in BMWFilms.com Presents: The Hire (tpb, 96 pages, 2006, ISBN 1-59307-183-3)
  - Harlan Ellison's Dream Corridor Volume 2: "The Silver Corridor" (adapted by Waid and Ty Templeton, art by Gene Ha, story created for the tpb, 168 pages, 2007, ISBN 1-59307-494-8)
- ACTOR Comics Presents: "True Tales of Horror from the Convention Trail" (prose story with illustrations by Rodolfo Migliari, anthology graphic novel, 152 pages, 2006, ISBN 0-9785008-1-4)
- Legendary (script by Waid from a story by Eric Church and Stephen J. Skelton, art by Martin Montiel Luna, graphic novel, 96 pages, Spark Unlimited, 2008, ISBN 0-615-21233-6)
- The Rocketeer (IDW Publishing):
  - Rocketeer Adventures #2: "It Ain't the Fall That Kills Ya..." (with Chris Weston, anthology, 2011) collected in Rocketeer Adventures Volume 1 (hc, 128 pages, 2011, ISBN 1-61377-034-0)
  - The Rocketeer: Cargo of Doom #1–4 (with Chris Samnee, 2012) collected as The Rocketeer: Cargo of Doom (hc, 104 pages, 2013, ISBN 1-61377-565-2)
  - The Rocketeer/The Spirit: Pulp Friction #1–4 (with Paul Smith, Loston Wallace and J. Bone, 2013) collected as The Rocketeer/The Spirit: Pulp Friction (hc, 104 pages, 2014, ISBN 1-61377-881-3)
- Legendary:
  - Shadow Walk (script by Waid from a story by Waid, Max Brooks and Thomas Tull, art by Shane Davis, graphic novel, 128 pages, 2013, ISBN 0-7851-5397-7)
  - The Rise and Fall of Axiom (with Ed Benes, graphic novel, 144 pages, 2016, ISBN 1-937278-73-5)
- Dynamite:
  - The Green Hornet vol. 5 (with Daniel Indro (#1–3) and Ronilson Freire, 2013–2014) collected as:
    - Bully Pulpit (collects #1–6, tpb, 160 pages, 2013, ISBN 1-60690-439-6)
    - Birth of a Villain (collects #7–13, tpb, 176 pages, 2014, ISBN 1-60690-498-1)
  - Doctor Spektor: Master of the Occult #1–4 (with Neil Edwards and Roberto Castro (#3–4), 2014) collected as Doctor Spektor: Master of the Occult (tpb, 136 pages, 2015, ISBN 1-60690-561-9)
  - The Damnation of Charlie Wormwood #1–5 (as editor; co-written by Christina Blanch and Chris Carr, drawn by Chee, 2014–2015)
    - Print version of the digital series initially released on Thrillbent; Waid's editorial duties reportedly consisted of physically recutting the art for publication.
    - The print version was subsequently collected by Source Point Press as The Damnation of Charlie Wormwood (tpb, 270 pages, 2019, ISBN 1-945940-49-2)
  - Justice Inc.: The Avenger #1–6 (with Ronilson Freire; issues #5–6 are co-written by Waid and Christopher Sequeira, 2015) collected as Justice, Inc.: The Avenger (tpb, 144 pages, 2016, ISBN 1-60690-995-9)
- Captain Kid #1–5 (co-written by Waid and Tom Peyer, art by Wilfredo Torres and Brent Peeples (#4), Aftershock, 2016–2017) collected as Captain Kid: Super-People Problems (tpb, 120 pages, 2017, ISBN 1-935002-86-4)
- Mine! (A Celebration of Liberty and Freedom for All Benefiting Planned Parenthood): "Gloria Richardson" (with John Broglia, anthology graphic novel, hc, 304 pages, ComicMix, 2018, ISBN 1-939888-66-2; sc, 2018, ISBN 1-939888-65-4)
- Destiny 2 Comic #3–4: "Warmind" (co-written by Waid and David A. Rodriguez, art by Kris Anka, free digital comics, Bungie, 2018) collected in Destiny Comic Collection Volume 1 (hc, 144 pages, 2019, ISBN 1-945683-95-3)
- Mae #8 (with Gene Ha, Lion Forge, 2018) collected in Mae Volume 2 (tpb, 176 pages, 2019, ISBN 1-5493-0280-9)
- Humanoids Publishing:
  - Ignited (co-written by Waid and Kwanza Osajefyo, art by Philippe Briones):
    - H1: Ignition (a Free Comic Book Day one-shot, 2019)
    - Ignited (with issues #9–10 released digitally, 2019–2021) collected as:
      - Triggered (collects #1–4, tpb, 100 pages, 2019, ISBN 1-64337-564-4)
      - Fight the Power (collects #5–10, tpb, 140 pages, 2021, ISBN 1-64337-799-X)
  - We are Humanoids: "The Incal" (with Stéphane Roux, anthology one-shot, 2020)
- Ahoy Comics:
  - Steel Cage: "Noah Zark" (with Lanna Souvanny, anthology one-shot, 2019)
  - The Wrong Earth: Confidence Men (with Leonard Kirk, one-shot, 2022) collected in The Wrong Earth: The One-Shots (tpb, 152 pages, 2022, ISBN 1-952090-20-2)
- Previews #408: "The First Supper" (with David Lapham, eight-page co-feature commissioned by Bad Idea, magazine published and distributed by Diamond, 2022)
