= Siku (comics) =

British-Nigerian comic artist

- Born: Ajibayo Akinsiku; September 9, 1965 (age 61) Leicester, England
- Areas: Penciller, Inker, Colourist
- Pseudonym: Siku
- Notable works: Judge Dredd; Tales of Telguuth; The Manga Bible

Siku is the pseudonym of British and Nigerian artist and writer Ajibayo Akinsiku, best known for his work in 2000 AD.

== Biography ==
Siku studied design and printing at the Yaba's School of Art, and theology at the London School of Theology. Siku's fully painted work (particularly on Judge Dredd and the Pan-African Judges stories) has been appearing in 2000 AD and the Judge Dredd Megazine since 1991.

He also created The Manga Bible: From Genesis to Revelation, an adaptation of Today's New International Version of the Holy Bible into manga format. Siku is also a theologian. His book Batman is Jesus is a narrative theological perspective of the life and work of Jesus Christ.

== Bibliography ==
Comics work includes:

- Anderson: Psi Division: "Reasons to Be Cheerful" (with Alan Grant, in Judge Dredd Megazine (vol. 2) No. 11, 1992)
- Judge Hershey: "Asylum" (with Robbie Morrison, in Judge Dredd Megazine (vol. 2) #25–26, 1993)
- One-Off: "Rapid Growth" (with Chris Standley, in Judge Dredd Megazine (vol. 2) No. 35, 1993)
- Pan-African Judges:
  - "Pan-African Judges" (with Paul Cornell, in Judge Dredd Megazine (vol. 2) #44–49, 1993–1994)
  - "Fever of the Gods" (script and art, in Judge Dredd Megazine (vol. 3) #6–13, 1995–1996)
- Judge Dredd:
  - "The Strange Case of Bill Clinton" (with John Wagner, in Judge Dredd Megazine (vol. 2) No. 72, 1995)
  - "Whatever Happened to Bill Clinton?" (with John Wagner, in Judge Dredd Megazine (vol. 2) No. 81, 1995)
  - "Fetish" (with John Smith, in Judge Dredd Megazine (vol. 3) #26–30, 1997)
  - "The Bouncey Brat Heist" (with John Wagner, in Judge Dredd Megazine (vol. 3) No. 42, June 1998)
  - "When the El Breaks" (with John Wagner, in 2000 AD #1099, June 1998)
  - "Vidspex" (with John Wagner, in Judge Dredd Megazine (vol. 3) No. 44, August 1998)
  - "Revenge of Trapper Hag" (with John Wagner, in 2000 AD #1165–1166, October 1999)
  - "Shakespeare at War" (with Alan Grant, in 2000 AD #1174, January 2000)
  - "Pumpkin Eater" (with Alan Grant, in 2000 AD #1180–1182, February–March 2000)
  - "Cube Life" (with John Wagner, in 2000 AD #1203, July 2000)
  - "Someone in the House" (with John Wagner, in 2000 AD #1205, August 2000)
  - "Kicking the Habit" (with John Wagner, in 2000 AD #1243, May 2001)
  - "A Tree Grows in Elia Kazan" (with John Wagner, in 2000 AD No. 302, July 2002)
  - "Meatmonger " (with John Smith, in 2000 AD #1365–1370, November–December 2003)
- Harlem Heroes: "Cyborg Death Trip" (inks, with writer Michael Fleisher and pencils by Kev Hopgood in 2000 AD #933–939, 1995)
- Witch World: "The Dark Man" (with Gordon Rennie, in 2000 AD #1050–52, 1997)
- Sinister Dexter (with Dan Abnett):
  - "The Mating Game" (in 2000 AD #1066, 1997)
  - "Whack the Dinosaur" (in 2000 AD #1075, 1997)
  - "Dressed to Kill" (in 2000 AD #1078, 1998)
  - "Suddenly, Genghis" (in 2000 AD #1271, 2001)
- Sláine: "The Swan Children" (with Pat Mills, in 2000 AD # 1112–1114, 1998)
- Downlode Tales: "Syn City" (with Dan Abnett in 2000 AD #1127, 1999)
- Pulp Sci-Fi:
  - "Female of the Species" (with Robbie Morrison, in 2000 AD #1149, 1999)
  - "Chronvicts" (with Gordon Rennie, in 2000 AD #1172, 1999)
- Tharg's Future Shocks: "Space Dust" (with Andrew Ness, in 2000 AD #1190, 2000)
- Tales of Telguuth (with Steve Moore):
  - "Music of the Spheres" (in 2000 AD #1193, 2000)
  - "Men of Snakewood" (in 2000 AD #1197, 2000)
  - "The Transfiguration of Tesro Karnik" (in 2000 AD #1227–29, 2001)
  - "The Oscillations of Taramasellion" (in 2000 AD #1235–36, 2001)
  - "The Hunting of the Veks" (in 2000 AD #1249, 2001)
  - "The Vileness of Scromyx" (in 2000 AD #1258–1260, 2001)
  - "The Infinite Return of Varkor Gan" (in 2000 AD # 1263, 2001)
  - "The Atrocities of Pagafruuz Jeel" (in 2000 AD #1283, 2001)
- Kane & Abel (in Front magazine, 2003)
- Far From Faith: Orions Becoming #1 (by Brambletyne Productions, 2006)
- The Manga Bible: Extreme (2007, Hodder & Stoughton, ISBN 0-340-91046-1)
- The Manga Bible: From Genesis to Revelation (2008, Galilee Trade, ISBN 0-385-52431-5)
