= Empire (comics) =

Comic book limited series

Publication information
- Publisher: Gorilla Comics (Image Comics); DC Comics; Thrillbent (IDW Publishing)
- Schedule: Monthly
- Format: Limited series
- Genre: Superhero
- Publication date: Gorilla; May and September 2000; DC; September 2003 – February 2004; Thrillbent/IDW; May 2015
- No. of issues: 6 (plus issue #0)

Creative team
- Created by: Mark Waid; Barry Kitson
- Written by: Mark Waid
- Penciller: Barry Kitson
- Inker: James Dean Pascoe
- Letterer: Comicraft
- Colorist: Badass
- Editor(s): Joey Cavalieri; Harvey Richards

Collected editions
- Empire: ISBN 1-4012-0212-8

Empire is an American comic book limited series created by Mark Waid and Barry Kitson. It was published between 2000 and 2004 by Gorilla Comics (an Image Comics imprint) and DC Comics, then sold to Thrillbent and IDW Publishing in 2015.

The protagonist is a Doctor Doom-like supervillain named Golgoth who has defeated all superheroes and conquered the world, but must now contend with internal power struggles.

== Publication history ==
The series was originally published in 2000 by Gorilla Comics, a company formed by Mark Waid, Kurt Busiek and several others, but the company folded after only two issues were produced. Empire was finished at DC Comics in 2003–2004, although it remains in its own fictional universe and is not part of the DC Universe (as yet). The already published two comic books were collected in a #0 and then the rest of the story was told over six issues.

In April 2014, the rights to the series reverted to Waid and Kitson and the series returned under Waid's Thrillbent comics platform. A sequel series, Empire: Uprising, debuted in 2015. It was cancelled after four issues, ending on a cliffhanger.

== Characters ==
- Golgoth is the Emperor of the world. He is human and at the beginning of the series, it is revealed that his wife is dead but his daughter is still alive. He is ruthless and ensures the loyalty of his Ministers through the use of a highly addictive booster drug called Eucharist. His powers seemingly come from his armour; he is never in the series seen without his mask. His powers include hand blasts and teleportation, a technology that greatly helped him in his fight against the world.
- Delfi is Golgoth's daughter who resides in the Empire's citadel and is treated by the Emperor and its people as a secluded princess. Golgoth keeps his business and ruthlessness secret from her and she seemingly knows nothing about his real actions. She spends the majority of her day studying or reading books that are recommended to her by the Emperor. The girl, however, reveals herself to be not as innocent as first suspected as the series progresses.
- Xanna is Minister of Execution. She is the Emperor's chief assassin but, being bored with her position (because the Emperor has killed most of his enemies), she chooses to ponder the origins of the Eucharist drug.
- Tumbril is Minister of Discipline and the Emperor's chief Torturer who uses pain and fear to extract information from the enemies of the Empire.
- Lohkyn is the newly appointed Minister of Espionage and is the character whose point of view the reader sees through much of the series. He develops a secret sexual relationship with Delfi.
- Lucullan is The Minister of War. He is known for frequently fumbling his words. He first met Golgoth in Australia 10 years prior to the events of issue #0.
- Kafra is the head of the Ministry of Information. Kafra has been modified and bound to his workstation for the purpose of co-ordinating and editing the news of the world to best represent the intentions and goals of the Empire.
- Sebirus is the Emperor's Domestic Advisor and an old friend of the Emperor. He knew the Emperor's wife before she died, and is close to Delfi. Due to his friendship and loyalty to the Emperor, he believes that he is the only indispensable member of the cabinet.
- Endymion is a superhero and Golgoth's greatest opponent. He was reportedly slain by Golgoth some time before the beginning of the story.

== Collected editions ==
The complete mini-series has been collected into a trade paperback, Empire ISBN 1-4012-0212-8, and reprinted in Empire ISBN 978-1-63140-305-7.

== Awards ==
- 2004: Nominated for "Best Limited Series" Eisner Award
