= The Manga Bible: From Genesis to Revelation =

Manga adaptation of the Bible

Front cover

The Manga Bible: From Genesis to Revelation is an original English-language manga adaptation of the Bible created by British artist Ajinbayo "Siku" Akinsiku, who was responsible for the concept and the art and the scripter Akin Akinsiku. It was released in July 2007 by Galilee Trade. They summarize the narrative of the Bible in a 200-page graphic novel including the Old Testament and the New Testament. With their work, they combine the Western and the Japanese culture to tell the Bible in a new way. The book is especially aimed at readers between the ages of 15 and 25. Church representatives were praising the graphic novel, as opening up the ideas of the Bible to a new target group. Ajinbayo Akinsiku was born in England and grew up in Nigeria; he now lives again in England. He thus represents different cultures in his artistic work, which becomes also apparent in The Manga Bible. He became known for his work on 2000 AD and Judge Dredd.

== Background ==
The text and quotes in The Manga Bible are from The Holy Bible, Today's New International Version that was first published in 2004. For those people who want to read further in the Bible, the artists have included "Want to know more?" links indicating the references that help to find the passage in the original scripture. Those links are also a good indicator for the reader to know which passages from the original Bible are included in The Manga Bible and which passages were left out. At the end of the book commentaries about key scenes are included. They give away some of the ideas that inspired Siku and Akin to write The Manga Bible, as well as the influences they had during the process. There are also sketches included that show the development of the art process.

Siku is one of many artists living in the West who has been open to the manga style in his work and he uses it in his own way. He is influenced by his own cultural background, thereby creating a manga in English based on a book commonly associated with Western culture, namely the Bible.

== Japanese influence ==
By using manga, Siku is not just influenced by the Japanese comic style, but also by its aesthetics and culture, with which manga is closely connected. One of those aesthetic concepts is a three-part development called shin-gyo-so. It comes from the Japanese calligraphy, where the formal alphabet of kanji is represented by shin. The semi-formal characters are called kana and stands for the gyo. Finally, the least formal script is the cursive and is represented by the so. This formula is also applied in other aspects of the Japanese culture, for example in gardens or tea ceremonies. Applying this concept to The Manga Bible, the book can be seen as an informal Bible, whereas the Bible in the church would be the formal one and the Bible people read at home would be seen as semi-formal. Within the manga itself, Siku also uses different levels of formality; there are pages, where he stays within the panels and other times where no panels at all exist. To illustrate the disorder of a war or the prophecies of the revelation, he also uses the technique of bleeding, which means that the drawing appears to continue over the edge of the page.

Another example for the close connection between the Japanese culture and its aesthetic is shown in the silent wandering of Jesus through the wilderness, triggering on the sensory memory of the reader. Siku describes the appearance of Jesus for example as "a Samurai stranger, who's come to town, in a silhouette". He also works with facial expressions of his characters. When the Egyptians are punished with the death of their first born, because the Israelites are not freed, Siku draws the characters with a facial expression that also elicits compassion in the reader, an effect that is often used in manga.

== Narrative ==
The Manga Bible is a summary of the Bible, which implies that many parts are left out, altered a bit, or only partially used. The text and the drawings are based on the original scripture, but they also use free interpretation. Even though many of the important stories from the Bible are included, there are also some that would be expected, but are left out. For example, the building of the Tower of Babel and the whole Book of Esther are missing, In the Old and the New Testament only about half of the books are used as a source for The Manga Bible. Many of the books that are left out would give only little to the development of the narrative, such as the Leviticus or books from the second part of the Old Testament, such as Micah or Habakkuk. This is mostly due to the style of manga, where the use of epic stories and action play an important role. Thus, The Manga Bible focuses on books that provide action and it also shows the violence and sexuality that is portrayed in the Bible. In the Book of Joshua the bloody fall of the Israelites' enemies is shown. The weakness of different characters is illustrated with the examples of the moral downfall of David with Bathshebe or when Samson is deceived to give away the secret of his power.

In The Manga Bible's rendition of the Old Testament entitled "The Book of God's People", Moses narrates the story of Genesis to a group of children. For a less conventional narrative style, the chronology of the books is sometimes changed or parts of one book are inserted in another one. So that for example the Book of Jonah is put between the two Books of Kings. The Book of Jonah is called "A Comedy Short" and is supposed to bring comic relief between the heavy issues of war and destruction that are persistent in the Old Testament. To emphasize the difference Siku uses a subgenre of manga called super deformed, in which the drawing is very simple or minimalist.

The story line is set up with many traditional images from the Bible. Siku shows the reader how the relationship between God and the people changed over the course of the Old Testament, so that he would no longer talk to his chosen people directly. After the Exodus, the Book of Judges plays a prominent role. The Book of Ruth is drawn in a different style and is mostly told as a love story. The stories of Samson and David are developed in more detail. The Old Testament ends with Prophets such as Daniel and leads over to the New Testament.

The second part, consisting of the New Testament is shorter than the first. The story of Jesus' birth is only told through the three kings, who were ordered by King Herod to look for a newborn. The events between the first encounter of Jesus with his disciples and his death are told in less than thirty pages, including the Parables of the Good Samaritan, the Unforgiving servant and the Prodigal Son. Those Parables are also drawn in a more informal style to indicate that the stories are, although important, not necessarily part of the overall chronology. This summary of Jesus' life requires many omissions, such as of the miracle of the loaves and fish, or most of the Parables. The narrative after the death of Jesus is mostly taken from the Acts of the Apostles.

The Book of Revelation differs from the rest of the New Testament, because it contains mostly visions and prophesies. Siku represents this by telling the revelation through the dreams of a girl in a hospital in the 21st century.

There are also several examples where contemporary ideas come in. In the Book of Job, Job asks himself, how he could have deserved his faith, when a bomb labeled "Fat Man" hits his house. Siku also includes maps in the Old Testament for example to show the journey of the Exodus. In the New Testament Jesus is tempted by the devil, who promises him the power over the world represented by contemporary New York and parts of other modern cities.

The book also makes use of irony or jokes, for example, when Adam sees the tree of good and evil in the Garden of Eden and his response is "Cool!". Noah later loses count of the animals heading to the ark, when he is up to 11,344, so he has to start all over again.

== Reception ==
The critique that Siku does not use a traditional style of manga, but rather a style that is close to English independent comics, appears in several reviews. The Manga Bible is definitely influenced by the English culture, especially because it retells the story of a book that most people in the West are at least somewhat familiar with.

Another point of critique is that The Manga Bible is too wordy for a traditional manga; Siku sees the need for that in the fact that he condenses the Bible in a 200-page graphic novel. To convey the message, more text is needed, or it would be difficult to follow the story line. It was also pointed out that due to the dense summary, the story moves in a fast pace and causes some theological flaws in The Manga Bible.

While most manga fans and reviews seem to be disappointed by the book and point out its weaknesses, the church praised the work. They see it as a book that opens up new ways of looking at the Bible. The archbishop of Canterbury, Rowan Williams, says about The Manga Bible: "It will convey the shock and freshness of the Bible in a unique way."

Siku himself sees in Jesus a superhero and not the traditional blond Christ that people know from Hollywood movies. He is currently working on a three-volume book called The Manga Jesus. The first volume was released in November 2008.

== See also ==
- The Action Bible
- The Brick Bible
