= Sergio Cariello =

Brazilian artist (born 1964)

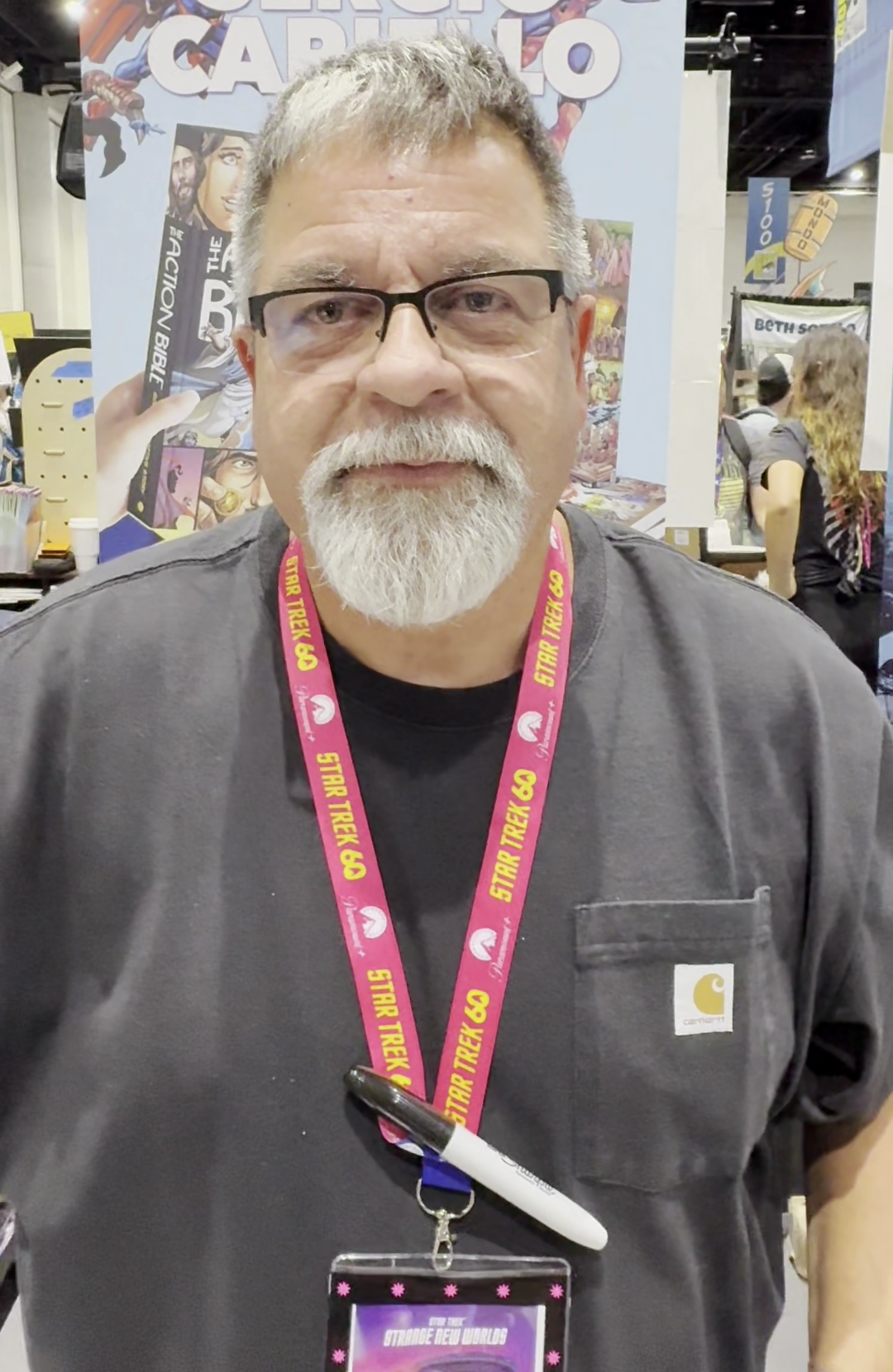
- Cariello in 2026
- Born: Sergio Cariello; April 23, 1964 (age 62) Recife, Brazil
- Area: Artist
- Notable works: The Lone Ranger; The Action Bible; Son of Samson

Sergio Cariello (born April 23, 1964) is a Brazilian-American comic book artist. He has done work for many major comic publishers through his career, including Marvel Comics and DC Comics, as well as popular independent companies like CrossGen Comics and Dynamite Entertainment. He is the younger brother of comics artist Octavio Cariello.

== Career ==
Sergio Cariello knew he wanted to be a cartoonist at age 5. At age 11 he created "Frederico, the Detective," a weekly comic strip for his local paper. He wrote and drew the whole strip himself. It ran until he was 14.

Cariello worked on his first comic book, "Dagon, the Worlds of HP Lovecraft," while attending the Joe Kubert School of Cartoon and Graphic Art. During his second year at the school, Virginia Romita hired him as a Bullpen Letterer at Marvel Comics. While there he was given pencilling assignments on Daredevil and Marvel Comics Presents: Spellbound.

When Pat Garrahay moved from Marvel to DC Comics, he offered Cariello pencilling duties on Deathstroke. At DC he also did work on Guy Gardner, Steel, Wonder Woman, Green Lantern, the Flash, Young Heroes in Love, Blue Beetle, Batman, and Azrael, among others.

When work slowed down, he got a teaching job at the Kubert School and taught several courses over 7 years. Currently, Cariello is pencilling and inking The Lone Ranger for Dynamite Entertainment. He finished the eighth installment of his Son of Samson series with writer Gary Martin for Zondervan. He has also illustrated The Action Bible, conceived as an updated version of André LeBlanc's The Picture Bible for David C. Cook Publishing, which was released on September 1, 2010.

== Selected bibliography ==
A selected bibliography of Sergio Cariello's comics work as interior artist.

- Batman/Wildcat #1-3 (DC Comics, 1997)
- Catwoman/Wildcat #1-4 (DC Comics, 1998)
- Batman: Legends of the Dark Knight #127-131 (DC Comics, 2000)
- Azrael: Agent of the Bat #69-100 (DC Comics, 2000–2003)
- Crux #25, 28-30, 32-33 (CrossGen, 2003–2004)
- Sojourn #34 (CrossGen, 2004)
- Deathstroke #41-51 (DC Comics, 2004–2005)
- The Lone Ranger #0-25 (Dynamite Entertainment, 2006–2011)
- Son of Samson volumes 1-8 (Zondervan, 2007–2010)
- The Action Bible (David C. Cook Publishing, 2010)
- The Christ (Kingstone Media, 2010)
- Captain America: Hail Hydra #1 (Marvel, 2011)
- DC Retroactive: Superman - The '80s #1 (DC Comics, 2011)
