= André LeBlanc (artist) =

Haitian comics artist

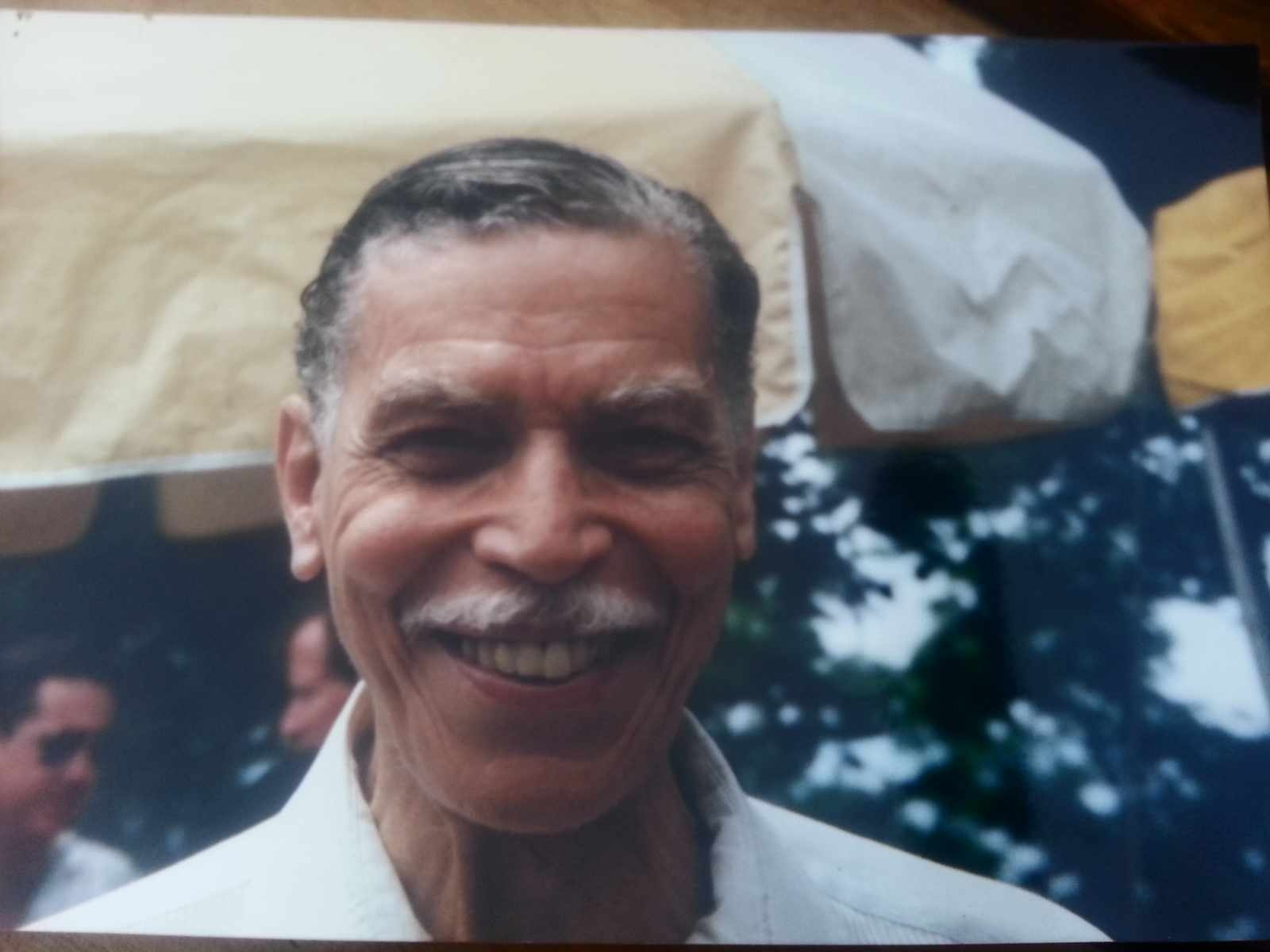
- Born: January 16, 1921 Haiti
- Died: December 21, 1998 (aged 77)
- Area: Cartoonist
- Notable works: The Picture Bible
- Awards: Southern Cross Award

André LeBlanc (January 16, 1921 – December 21, 1998) was a Haitian artist who worked on comic strips and comic books of the 1940s and 1950s. He was an instructor at New York's School of Visual Arts.

== Early life ==
André LeBlanc was born in Haiti, but moved to the United States in the 1920s after his father was killed in Cuba.

== Career ==
LeBlanc worked as an assistant with Will Eisner on The Spirit and with Sy Barry on The Phantom. He also contributed to the Flash Gordon, Apartment 3-G and Rex Morgan, M.D. newspaper strips.

LeBlanc is also known as the illustrator of the 1979 epic The Picture Bible published by David C. Cook. He drew for King Comics' Mandrake the Magician comic book. His various features for comic books included Dr. E.Z. Duzit, Intellectual Amos.

In the Brazilian market, he created the jungle girl Morena Flor, published in daily strips and in the comic book Capitão Atlas. Edicão Maravilhosa, the Brazilian version of Classics Illustrated, where he adapted classics of Brazilian literature. He also illustrated books by the Brazilian writer Monteiro Lobato.

== Personal life ==
In 1944, he moved to Brazil and married a Brazilian woman named Elvira.

== Awards ==
LeBlanc's illustrations brought him the Southern Cross Award, the highest honor that can be given to a Brazilian citizen.
