= The Action Bible =

2010 comic book

Front cover

The Action Bible is a retelling of the Christian Bible in comic book form written and edited by Doug Mauss and illustrated by Sergio Cariello for David C. Cook, published in 2010. Andre LeBlanc's 1978 The Picture Bible was a major influence on the project.

The Action Bible has been translated into 29 languages and is distributed in 32 countries by David C. Cook. An excerpt from the Bible, The Story of Jesus, is available in more than 50 languages and has been distributed in more than 51 million copies in 97 countries. It is also available as a mobile app from Youth for Christ.

== See also ==
- The Manga Bible: From Genesis to Revelation
- The Picture Bible
