= The Picture Bible =

1978 comic strip illustrated by Andre LeBlanc

1978 hardback cover

The Picture Bible is a comic strip telling of the Bible edited by Iva Hoth with illustrations by Andre LeBlanc. It was first published in full colour form by David C. Cook in 1978.

LeBlanc's The Picture Bible was an influence on The Action Bible by Sergio Cariello for David C. Cook, 2010.
