= Batman: Mask of the Phantasm =

1993 film by Eric Radomski and Bruce Timm

- Theatrical release poster
- Directed by: Eric Radomski; Bruce Timm
- Screenplay by: Alan Burnett; Paul Dini; Martin Pasko; Michael Reaves
- Story by: Alan Burnett
- Based on: Batman by; Bob Kane; Bill Finger (Note: Uncredited); Batman: The Animated Series by; Eric Radomski; Bruce Timm
- Produced by: Benjamin Melniker; Michael Uslan
- Starring: Kevin Conroy; Dana Delany; Hart Bochner; Abe Vigoda; Stacy Keach; Mark Hamill
- Edited by: Al Breitenbach
- Music by: Shirley Walker
- Production company: Warner Bros. Animation (Note: Animation services provided by Dong Yang Animation and Spectrum Animation)
- Distributed by: Warner Bros.
- Release date: December 25, 1993
- Running time: 76 minutes
- Country: United States
- Language: English
- Budget: $6 million
- Box office: $5.8 million

Batman: Mask of the Phantasm is a 1993 American animated superhero film directed by Eric Radomski and Bruce Timm, and written by Alan Burnett, Paul Dini, Martin Pasko, and Michael Reaves. It is based on Batman: The Animated Series (1992–1995), which was itself based on the DC Comics superhero Batman. It is also the first film of the DC Animated Universe and the only one to receive a theatrical release. Kevin Conroy, Mark Hamill, Efrem Zimbalist Jr., Bob Hastings and Robert Costanzo reprise their voice roles from the series, joined by Dana Delany, Hart Bochner, Stacy Keach, Abe Vigoda, Dick Miller and John P. Ryan.

Produced between the first and second seasons of the series, the film follows Batman as he reconciles with a former lover, Andrea Beaumont, and faces a mysterious vigilante, the titular Phantasm, who is murdering Gotham City's crime bosses. The plot partly mirrors Mike W. Barr's "Batman: Year Two" comic book story arc, with the Reaper from it loosely inspiring the Phantasm character made for the film, while also borrowing elements from the "Batman: Year One" arc, recounting how Bruce Wayne became Batman and his first attempts to fight crime.

Originally planned for a direct-to-video release, Warner Bros. Pictures ultimately gave Mask of the Phantasm a theatrical release, condensing its production into a strenuous eight-month schedule. The film was the first theatrical feature film produced by Warner Bros. Animation, and was released through the studio's Family Entertainment label on December 25, 1993, to generally positive reviews from critics, who praised the stylized animation, voice performances, story, and music.

Due to the decision to release it in theaters on short notice, Mask of the Phantasm failed at the box office. After its release on home media, it became financially successful. Until the limited release of Batman: The Killing Joke in 2016, Mask of the Phantasm was the only animated Batman film to be given a theatrical release, as well as the only one to receive a full theatrical release until The Lego Batman Movie in 2017.

== Plot ==
A young Bruce Wayne, after years of training abroad, vows to fight crime in Gotham City in memory of his murdered parents. While he is initially successful in thwarting robberies, he is disappointed that criminals are unafraid of him and seeks an intimidating disguise. He also begins a relationship with Andrea Beaumont after they meet at the Gotham Cemetery while she pays respects to her mother. Though conflicted about whether to honor his promise to his parents or pursue a happy life with Andrea, Bruce eventually proposes to her. However, Andrea abruptly leaves Gotham with her father, businessman Carl Beaumont, ending the engagement in a Dear John letter. Heartbroken, Bruce commits to a new life as a vigilante crime fighter, converting a cavern under Wayne Manor into a base and assuming the mantle of Batman for ten years.

In the present day, Batman interrupts mobster Chuckie Sol and his associates plotting to launder counterfeit money. Sol escapes but dies after crashing his car during a confrontation with the Phantasm, a masked vigilante resembling the Grim Reaper. Witnesses see Batman at the scene, leading councilman Arthur Reeves to vow to have him arrested. Mobster Buzz Bronski visits Sol's grave at the Gotham Cemetery, where he is murdered by the Phantasm, whom Bronski's bodyguards mistake for Batman. While investigating the scene of Bronski's death, Batman lingers by his parents' grave, where he encounters Andrea, who deduces his identity.

Batman discovers that Sol, Bronski, and another mobster named Salvatore Valestra were bankrolled by Carl Beaumont. He interrogates Andrea, who claims no knowledge of Carl's whereabouts. After learning of Sol's and Bronski's deaths, the elderly and ailing Valestra fears Batman will kill him next. He seeks help from his former ally, Councilman Arthur Reeves, but is rebuffed. In desperation, he turns to the Joker, offering him $5 million to kill Batman, and reminds him that the killer will be after him next. The Phantasm goes to confront Valestra in his penthouse, only to find that he has already been killed by the Joker. Instead of saving Valestra, the Joker rigged a camera to the mob boss's body to identify the mysterious killer. The Joker then remotely triggers rigged explosives, but the Phantasm escapes and avoids capture by Batman. Responding to the blast, the police pursue Batman, who eventually eludes them with last-minute help from Andrea.

Andrea admits to Bruce that her father worked for Valestra and was forced to take her into hiding in Europe because he was unable to repay money that he had embezzled from the mob. Carl later accumulated a fortune and offered to repay the mob, but they refused to lift the hit on him. Andrea says that she returned to Gotham to stop Carl from killing his former partners. Bruce and Andrea consider resuming their relationship, despite Bruce's uncertainty. Bruce later examines an old photograph of the mobsters and recognizes that Valestra's enforcer was the Joker before his disfigurement. (Note: As revealed in The New Batman Adventures episode "Beware the Creeper," the Joker's disfigurement occurred at Ace Chemicals five years after Batman's debut.) The Joker confronts Reeves, accusing him of ordering the murders to hide his mob connections, but a call from Andrea interrupts them and shifts the Joker's suspicion onto her. Reeves is poisoned with Joker's toxin and taken to the hospital, where Batman forces him to confess that he previously worked as the Beaumonts' lawyer and helped them hide from the mob. Carl refused to bankroll Reeves's first struggling election campaign, so Reeves revealed his location to Valestra in exchange for the mob's support. Batman visits Andrea's apartment in her absence and intercepts a message for her from the Joker, who implies that he knows that Andrea is the Phantasm, then survives the Joker's bombing of the apartment. Batman determines that the Joker, the now last surviving former member of Valestra's mob, killed Carl Beaumont on the mob's order and that Andrea has gone after him.

Andrea confronts the Joker at his hideout, the abandoned Gotham World's Fair, where he attempts to trap and kill her, but she is saved by Batman, who unsuccessfully pleads with her to stop. The Joker tries to escape but is incapacitated by Batman and surrenders to Andrea, who bids Bruce farewell before disappearing with the Joker as the fair explodes. (Note: The Batman & Robin Adventures Annual #1 (November 1996), which acts as a direct sequel to Mask of the Phantasm, revealed that Andrea escapes the explosion through the sewers. As she contemplates whether to kill the Joker, she loses her grip on him and he gets washed away through the sewage river.) Bruce survives and is later consoled in the Batcave by Alfred, who assures him that he could not have stopped Andrea's self-destructive revenge, before discovering that Andrea has left her locket containing an old picture of Bruce and her as a couple. A sorrowful Andrea departs Gotham on an ocean liner, and Batman resumes his watch over the city.

== Voice cast ==
- Kevin Conroy as Bruce Wayne / Batman
- Dana Delany as Andrea "Andi" Beaumont
- Hart Bochner as City Councilman Arthur Reeves
- Stacy Keach as Carl Beaumont and the Phantasm
- Abe Vigoda as Salvatore "The Wheezer" Valestra
- Dick Miller as Charles "Chuckie" Sol
- John P. Ryan as Buzz Bronski
- Efrem Zimbalist Jr. as Alfred Pennyworth
- Bob Hastings as Commissioner James "Jim" Gordon
- Robert Costanzo as Detective Harvey Bullock
- Mark Hamill as The Joker
- Jane Downs as Party Guest #1
- Pat Musick as Announcer
- Vernee Watson-Johnson as Party Guest #2
- Ed Gilbert as Doctor, Police Dispatch, Jake and Dougan
- Peter Renaday as Additional Voices
- Jeff Bennett as Burton Earny, Helicopter Cop #1, Police Officer and Laughing Biker Thug
- Charles Howerton as Helicopter Cop #2 and Thug
- Thom Pinto as News Camera Operator
- Marilu Henner as Veronica Vreeland
- Neil Ross as Biker Thug
- Arleen Sorkin as Mrs. Bambi (uncredited)
- Judi M. Durand as World of the Future Fair Announcer (uncredited)
- Dan Castellaneta as Additional Voices (uncredited)
- Tress MacNeille as Additional Voices (uncredited)

== Production ==
Impressed by the success of the first season of Batman: The Animated Series on Fox, Warner Bros. Pictures assigned Alan Burnett to write a story for a full-length animated film. The original idea for the film was to have Batman being captured by his enemies at Arkham Asylum and face a kangaroo court in which the villains try him for making them what they are. The idea's concept, however, was considered "too brainy", as it required Batman to be immobile for a long time, so the idea was later used in the series' episode "Trial", which was aired after the film's release. Although the Joker does play a pivotal role in the film, it was Burnett's intention to tell a story far removed from the television series' regular rogues gallery. Burnett also cited he "wanted to do a love story with Bruce because no one had really done it on the TV show. I wanted a story that got into his head." Members of the creative team have claimed that they did not intend for the Joker to appear in the film; Paul Dini has contradicted this, stating that the Joker's role was always part of the story from the beginning of the film's production. The writers were highly cautious of placing the Joker in the film, as they did not want any connection to Tim Burton's 1989 film Batman, but writer Michael Reaves said, "We then realized that we could make his appearance serve the story in a way that we never could in live-action." In order to keep the Joker as a solo threat, Bruce Timm and Burnett convinced frequent Animated Series writer Dini to not use Harley Quinn in the film for that reason (although Arleen Sorkin did a bit part in the film voicing a minor character). The same technique was previously used in the episodes "The Strange Secret of Bruce Wayne" and "Joker's Wild". Conversely, the episode "Harley's Holiday" featured Harley Quinn and did not feature the Joker.

Aiding Burnett in writing the script were Martin Pasko, who handled most of the flashback segments; Reaves, who wrote the climax; and Dini, who states he "filled in holes here and there". Orson Welles' 1941 classic Citizen Kane served as an influence for the flashbacks, a story about loss and the passage of time. According to Kevin Conroy, Andrea Beaumont was named after voice director Andrea Romano. The character of Hazel, the cook robot of the World of the Future Fair, was named by Burnett after Hazel the Maid (portrayed by Shirley Booth), The Saturday Evening Post protagonist of cartoonist Ted Key's TV series Hazel. On the other hand, the design of the Phantasm went into 20 different versions until one was found which convinced the film's crew. According to Burnett, the Phantasm was like the Grim Reaper with a cape, although the idea was to make her resemble the Ghost of Christmas Yet to Come of Charles Dickens' novel A Christmas Carol, something that even the Joker mentions in the finished version of the film.

"It was basically an expanded episode. We boarded the script and did all of our designs and shipped it overseas. We were treating it with more quality, but we originally didn't intend it for the big screen."

— Eric Radomski on Warner Bros.' decision to release the film theatrically

Early in production, Warner Bros. decided to release Phantasm theatrically, rather than straight to video. That left less than a year for production time (most animated features take well over two years from finished story to final release). Due to this decision, the animators had to adjust the layout of scenes in order to accommodate the widescreen theatrical aspect ratio. The studio granted the filmmakers a large amount of creative control.

Warner Bros. also increased the production budget to $6 million, which gave the filmmakers opportunities for more elaborate set pieces. The opening title sequence featured a flight through an entirely computer-generated (CGI) Gotham City. As a visual joke, sequence director Kevin Altieri set the climax of the film inside a miniature automated model of Gotham City, where Batman and the Joker are giants. This was an homage to a mainstay of Batman comic books of the Dick Sprang era, often featuring the hero fighting against a backdrop of gigantic props (they would later do another homage to Sprang's works in The New Batman Adventures episode "Legends of the Dark Knight"). From start to finish, the film was completed within eight months. The film's animation was provided by regular Batman: The Animated Series overseas studios: Dong Yang Animation in South Korea and Spectrum Animation in Japan. While most of the animation was done by Dong Yang, Spectrum handled the layout work.

The film's plot heavily resembles the 1987 storyline "Batman: Year Two", written by Mike W. Barr and illustrated by Alan Davis and Todd McFarlane. Bruce Timm called "Year Two" an "accidental inspiration" when designing the Phantasm, stating that he did not consciously base the Phantasm's look on the visually and thematically similar "Year Two" villain the Reaper, while Alan Burnett said he modeled Phantasm's modus operandi after the Spider-Man villain Mysterio, namely "the idea of someone who could disappear into smoke." Conversely, in May 2017, Barr stated he believed Mask of the Phantasm's similarities with "Year Two" were intentional, claiming, "I dropped by the offices of the BTAS staff twice [and] each time I dropped by I saw a guy—a different guy each time—industriously typing away, with a copy of Batman: Year Two open beside him. That was when I first became aware of their use of 'Year Two' [for the film]," with the early designs of the Phantasm in particular convincing him to bring up the matter of financial compensation to Paul Levitz at DC Comics. After telling Levitz, "I really want to keep this in the family," Barr was given a portion of the film's earnings, as well as money for the creation of the Phantasm herself.

== Themes ==
Paul Dini intended each of the flashbacks into Batman's love life to "have a tendency to get worse, when you hope things will get better." Bruce's relationship with Andrea, which at first shows promise, eventually turns into turmoil. At first, Bruce and Andrea are set for marriage, but then Bruce is given a farewell note from Andrea cutting off their relationship. This seals Bruce's decision to become Batman after he had previously forsaken it to settle down with her. Richard Corliss of Time felt this scene paralleled Andrea's decision to avenge her own parents and reject love when she finds her own father murdered. Both events transform the two people (Bruce becomes Batman, Andrea becomes the Phantasm). One scene depicts Bruce Wayne at his parents' tombstone saying, "I didn't count on being happy." According to Reaves, this scene was to be a pivotal moment in Bruce's tragic life, as he denies himself the opportunity to live a normal life. Reaves also stated: "When Bruce puts on the mask for the first time, [after Andrea breaks their engagement], and Alfred says 'My God!' he's reacting in horror, because he's watching this man he's helped raise from childhood, this man who has let the desire for vengeance and retribution consume his life, at last embrace the unspeakable."

== Music ==
The soundtrack was composed by Shirley Walker, the main composer for The Animated Series. Walker cited the score as a favorite among her own compositions. In an interview with Cinemusic.com, Walker explained that the "Latin" lyrics used in the main title were actually names of key Warner Bros. staff read backwards. The song "I Never Even Told You" was written by Siedah Garrett and Glen Ballard, and performed by Tia Carrere. Hans Zimmer, who would later compose the score for Christopher Nolan's The Dark Knight Trilogy and Batman v Superman: Dawn of Justice, played the synthesizer on the score.

The score was originally released on December 14, 1993, by Reprise Records. On March 24, 2009, La-La Land Records released a limited expanded edition. The release includes all tracks found on the original release with some tracks expanded. It also features almost 30 minutes of previously unreleased material.

== Marketing ==
In December 1993, two novelizations were released. One was a young readers book written by Andrew Helfer, the other an adult-oriented novelization authored by Geary Gravel.

DC Comics released a comic book adaptation written by Kelley Puckett and drawn by Mike Parobeck. The comic book adaptation was later included with the VHS release. Kenner, who had already released toys for the cartoon series, produced several tie-in figures for the film, including Joker and the Phantasm (packaged unmasked, spoiling a pivotal plot point in the film). Batman & Robin Adventures Annual #1: Shadow of the Phantasm is a comic book sequel to the film. It was written by Dini and released in 1996. In 2015, a DC Collectibles action figure 2-pack featuring Batman and Phantasm was released.

== Home media ==
Mask of the Phantasm was released on LaserDisc in April 1994 and on VHS in May of the same year. The VHS was reissued in April 2003 as part of a three-tape pack with Batman & Mr. Freeze: SubZero and Batman Beyond: Return of the Joker. Mask of the Phantasm was first released on DVD in December 1999 as a snap case and in October 2005 as a keep case with the insert. The film was re-released in April 2004 as a three-disc DVD box set that included SubZero and Return of the Joker. That version is currently out of print. Warner Home Video re-released the film again in February 2008 as a double feature DVD with SubZero.

The film was released as part of the Warner Archive Collection on Blu-ray on July 25, 2017, featuring new high definition transfers in 16:9 and open matte 4:3 presentations. The film was also included in the Blu-ray release of the Batman: The Complete Animated Series box set in late 2018.

The film was released on Ultra HD Blu-ray on September 12, 2023. It featured a 26-minute documentary about the legacy of Kevin Conroy, who died 9 months prior to the 4K re-release.

== Reception ==
=== Box office ===
Batman: Mask of the Phantasm opened on Christmas Day, 1993 in the United States in 1,506 theaters, accumulating $1.2 million over its first 2 days. The film went on to gross $5.8 million in the domestic total box office intake. The filmmakers blamed Warner Bros. Pictures for the unsuccessful marketing campaign, which is commonly attributed to the rushed production schedule due to the studio's last-minute decision to release the film theatrically. Despite this, Mask of the Phantasm eventually turned a profit with its various home media releases.

=== Critical response ===
Mask of the Phantasm is possibly the best Batman movie ever made; it certainly has the best story... That movie will always stand up against time and it's a testament to the quality of the show that Bruce (Timm) launched in 1992.

— producer Michael Uslan

On the review aggregator website Rotten Tomatoes, 83% of 58 critics' reviews are positive, with an average rating of 7.1/10. The website's consensus reads: "Stylish and admirably respectful of the source material, Batman: Mask of the Phantasm succeeds where many of the live-action Batman adaptations have failed." Metacritic, which uses a weighted average, assigned the film a score of 65 out of 100, based on 18 critics, indicating "generally favorable" reviews.

Empire cited it as the best animated film of 1993, and felt its plot was better than those of Tim Burton's Batman and Batman Returns. TV Guide Magazine was impressed with the Art Deco and noir design that was presented. In addition the film's climax and Batman's escape from the Gotham City Police Department were considered to be elaborate action sequences. Richard Harrington of The Washington Post agreed with overall aspects that included the animation, design, dialogue and storyline, as well as Shirley Walker's film score. Gene Siskel and Roger Ebert regretted not having viewed the film during its theatrical release and gave it a positive review on their television series, At the Movies, when the film was released on home media, with Siskel feeling that Phantasm was better than Batman Returns and Joel Schumacher's Batman Forever, and only slightly below Batman.

However, Chris Hicks of the Deseret News felt "the picture didn't come alive until the third act" feeling that the animators sacrificed the visuals for the storyline. Leonard Klady of Variety had mixed reactions towards the film, but his review was negative overall. He felt the overall themes and morals were clichéd and cited the animation to be to the "point of self-parody".

In a 2010 list, IGN ranked Mask of the Phantasm as the 25th best animated film of all time. That same year, IGN also stated it was "the Dark Knight's best big screen story" until Batman Begins. In 2011, Total Film also named Mask of the Phantasm as one of the greatest animated films of all time, coming in at 47th out of 50. Time ranked Phantasm as one of the 10 best superhero films ever in 2011. In 2017, Screen Rant named the film the best Batman film of all time. In 2018, Paste magazine called the film "the greatest Batman movie". In 2022, Empire magazine named Mask of the Phantasm the best Batman film. Also in 2022, nearly 30 years after its release, Rolling Stone placed Mask of the Phantasm at number 19 on its list of the 50 Greatest Superhero Movies of All Time, being the only traditionally animated film included, the third-best animated superhero film and the second-best Batman film of all time, behind only The Dark Knight (number 8).

Mask of the Phantasm was cited as an example of a film that effectively personified the character's "inner bubble" and psyche by actor Robert Pattinson, who portrayed Batman in the Matt Reeves film The Batman (2022).

To commemorate the film's 20th anniversary, a screening of the film was held in Santa Monica with cast members Kevin Conroy, Dana Delany and Mark Hamill in attendance. To commemorate the film's 25th anniversary, Fathom Events rereleased the film for one day on November 12, 2018.

=== Accolades ===
Alongside The Lion King and The Nightmare Before Christmas, Mask of the Phantasm was nominated for an Annie Award in the category of Best Animated Feature, but lost to the former.

== Bibliography ==
- Bruce Timm; Erick Nolen-Weathington (June 2004). Modern Masters Volume 3: Bruce Timm (Paperback). A detailed analysis on the works of Bruce Timm, the director of this film. TwoMorrows Publishing. ISBN 978-1-893905-30-6.
- Andy Helfer (December 1, 1993). Batman: Mask of the Phantasm – The Animated Movie, A Novelization (Paperback). Novelization of the film. Skylark. ISBN 978-0-553-48174-7.
- Geary Gravel (December 1, 1993). Batman: Mask of the Phantasm (Mass Market Paperback). Novelization of the film. Bantam Books. ISBN 978-0-553-56581-2.
- Kelley Puckett (December 1993). Batman: Mask of the Phantasm; Comic book adaptation of the film (Paperback). Mike Parobeck (illustrator). DC Comics. ISBN 978-1-56389-122-9.
