= Spectrum Animation =

Japanese animation studio

Spectrum Animation was an animation studio in Japan, made up of former TMS Entertainment employees. Spectrum animated several episodes of Batman: The Animated Series.

On the commentary track for "Heart of Ice" on the Batman: The Animated Series, Volume One DVD, producer Bruce Timm stated that Spectrum was responsible for airbrushing Mr. Freeze's helmet in every frame that featured him. Such attention to detail ultimately drove the studio to bankruptcy; most of their staff members are now working for Production I.G.

Frank Paur (director, "Vendetta", Batman: The Animated Series) praised Spectrum's animation. "We wanted to keep the show heavy on the mist, the rain. I wanted reflections, mist, gentle rain to play up the whole motif. I was really worried at first that it would go to a bad studio."

Moreover, Spectrum was credited for providing overseas animation work for a few DIC Entertainment productions such as Captain N: The Game Master (2nd season), Bill & Ted's Excellent Adventures, and Madeline.

== Episode list ==
The episodes of Batman: The Animated Series that were animated by Spectrum Animation Studio are:

- "On Leather Wings"
- "P.O.V"
- "It's Never Too Late"
- "Vendetta"
- "Heart of Ice"
- "Beware the Gray Ghost"
- "Robin's Reckoning, Part 1"

== Awards ==
Emmy Award – Robin's Reckoning, Part 1
1993 Outstanding Animated Program (For Programming Less Than One Hour)

== Layout services ==
Spectrum Animation provided layout services for the following episodes of Batman: The Animated Series. However, Dong Yang did the animation for these episodes.

- "Almost Got 'I'm"
- "See No Evil"
- "The Laughing Fish"
- "Robin's Reckoning, Part 2"
- "Tyger Tyger"
- "Zatanna"
- "Shadow of the Bat, Part 1"
- "Shadow of the Bat, Part 2"
- "His Silicon Soul"
- "Fire from Olympus"
- "The Worry Men"
- "Sideshow"

Spectrum and Dong Yang Animation both worked on the animation for the feature film Batman: Mask of the Phantasm. Dong Yang did the animation for Mask of the Phantasm, and Spectrum did the layout services.
