= Defending Your Life =

1991 US romantic comedy-fantasy film by Albert Brooks

- Theatrical release poster
- Directed by: Albert Brooks
- Written by: Albert Brooks
- Produced by: Michael Grillo
- Starring: Albert Brooks; Meryl Streep; Rip Torn; Lee Grant; Buck Henry
- Cinematography: Allen Daviau
- Edited by: David Finfer
- Music by: Erroll Garner; Michael Gore
- Production company: The Geffen Film Company
- Distributed by: Warner Bros.
- Release date: March 22, 1991
- Running time: 111 minutes
- Country: United States
- Language: English
- Budget: > $20 million
- Box office: $16.4 million

Defending Your Life is a 1991 American romantic comedy-fantasy film about a man who finds himself on trial in the afterlife, where proceedings examine his lifelong fears, to determine whether he will be (yet again) reincarnated on Earth, or move on to the next phase of existence. Written, directed by, and starring Albert Brooks, the film also stars Meryl Streep, Rip Torn, Lee Grant, and Buck Henry. Despite comedic overtones, the film also contains elements of drama and allegory.

== Plot ==
Los Angeles advertising executive Daniel Miller dies in a car accident on his 39th birthday, and is sent to Judgment City, an area for the recently deceased. The city is a waiting area staffed by bureaucrats who, having themselves moved on to their current new universal phase, pass judgement on the latest arrivals who will have their lives (or most recent lives) on Earth judged over a week-long or so hearing, each before two judges. Amenities and activities are provided, from calorie-free, all-you-can-eat buffets to bowling alleys and comedy clubs.

Daniel's defense attorney, Bob Diamond, explains that people from Earth use so little of their brains that they spend most of their lives functioning based on their fears. If the court determines that Daniel has conquered his fears, he will be sent on to the next phase of existence. Otherwise, his soul will be reincarnated on Earth to live another life in another attempt at moving past his fears.

At Daniel's tribunal, Diamond argues that Daniel should move on to the next phase, but his formidable opponent, prosecutor Lena Foster, takes the opposing argument. Each uses video-like footage from select days in Daniel's life to make their case to the judges.

During his stay in Judgment City, Daniel meets and falls in love with Julia, a woman who recently died, who lived a seemingly perfect life of courage and generosity. Following each day's proceedings, Daniel and Julia spend time exploring Judgment City, including the Pavilion of Past Lives (hosted by a version of Shirley MacLaine, famous for her outspoken belief in reincarnation), where people can see all their past lives, often quite shockingly dichotomous.

In the meantime, things do not go well for Daniel. Foster shows a series of episodes in which Daniel never managed to overcome his fears and various other destructive decisions and mishaps. At the same time, Diamond vigorously attempts to portray Daniel's actions more positively, sometimes praising his client's "restraint" and "thoughtfulness".

Before the last day of Daniel's hearing, Julia asks Daniel to spend the night with her, but he declines despite his strong feelings for her. Foster plays footage of Daniel's previous night with Julia over Diamond's objections the next day. Foster argues this underscores Daniel's fear and lack of courage. The next day, the court ruled that Daniel will return to Earth, while Julia is judged worthy to move on. Before saying goodbye, Diamond comforts Daniel with the knowledge that the court is not infallible and that just because Foster won does not mean she is right, but Daniel remains disappointed.

Daniel boards a tram poised to return to Earth when Julia yells to him from a different tram. He manages to unstrap himself, claw open a door, and race to Julia's tram, but she cannot open the door. He clings to the outside of the moving vehicle, banging on the door and trying to pry it open. They tell each other they love each other. The scene pulls back to show that the entire event is being watched on closed-circuit TV by Diamond, Foster, and the judges in the chamber where Daniel's hearing occurred. Diamond remarks to Foster, "Brave enough for you?" and she gives him a slight smiling acknowledgment. One judge whispers to the other, then sends a message ordering the tram doors to open. Daniel and Julia are reunited, applauded by the other passengers, and embrace as they are allowed to move on to the next phase of existence together.

== Cast ==
- Albert Brooks as Daniel Miller
- Meryl Streep as Julia
- Rip Torn as Bob Diamond
- Lee Grant as Lena Foster
- Buck Henry as Dick Stanley, Daniel's substitute attorney
- George D. Wallace as Daniel's Judge
- Lillian Lehman as Daniel's Judge
- S. Scott Bullock as Daniel's Father
- Carol Bivins as Daniel's Mother
- Susan Walters as Daniel's Wife
- Gary Beach as Car Salesman

Shirley MacLaine has a cameo appearance as the holographic host of the "Past Lives Pavilion"—a reference to her publicly known belief in reincarnation.

== Production ==
Brooks worked on the story for over two years. "I wanted the equation to be a non-religious, non-heaven-like after-life," he said. "And I think the most interesting thing about the movie is what it says about the earth...Self-examination got a bad rap with all the yuppies turning inward. I think it's an important thing to do." An early draft of the script included a different ending where Daniel is sent back as a horse, but Brooks found himself gradually drawn into the love story aspect of the plot and rewrote it accordingly.

Streep was announced for the cast in November 1989. Brooks explained, "I'm friends with Carrie Fisher and they worked together in Postcards From The Edge and we had dinner. Meryl joked and said, 'Is there a part for me?' I said, 'Yeah, right.' I would never have thought of her because I thought she was so unapproachable. But she's remarkably approachable. She's so average it's ridiculous. And so funny!" Brooks rewrote the part for Streep. "Comedy is rhythms. Writing is rhythms," he explained. "If you're writing and you have a specific person in mind, the imitative part of you copies that person a little bit and you get closer to that person's rhythms than your own."

Filming began on February 12, 1990. A January 1990 news release described the plot as "a fantasy about overcoming fears" where Streep and Brooks play people who are separately on trial, but further details about the plot were not released publicly. In January 1991, more details about the plot were released, describing it as involving "a neurotic advertising executive who dies in a car accident and then must defend his earthly actions before a kind of reincarnation review board".

Some scenes were shot at Mile Square Park in Fountain Valley, Irvine, and Anaheim, California. A scene where comedian Roger Behr plays "the worst comedian in the history of civilization" was filmed at The Comedy Store in West Hollywood. During production, around 1,000 extras were hired by WB at a cost of $200,000.

The film was released on March 22, 1991.

== Reception ==
The film received overwhelmingly positive reviews from critics and holds a 92% rating on review aggregator Rotten Tomatoes based on 48 reviews, with a weighted average of 7.7/10. The consensus summarizes: "With Defending Your Life, writer-director-star Albert Brooks softens his trademark caustic humor -- and proves he's every bit as funny when he's tugging heartstrings."

Variety called it an "inventive and mild bit of whimsy" in which Brooks has a "little fun with the Liliom idea of being judged in a fanciful afterlife, but he doesn't carry his conceit nearly far enough." Roger Ebert called it "funny in a warm, fuzzy way" and a film with a "splendidly satisfactory ending, which is unusual for an Albert Brooks film." The New York Times called it "the most perceptive and convincing among a recent spate of carpe diem films"—a reference to films such as Dead Poets Society (1989), Field of Dreams (1989) and Ghost (1990). Richard Schickel wrote:

Defending Your Life is better developed as a situation than it is as a comedy (though there are some nice bits, like a hotel lobby sign that reads, WELCOME KIWANIS DEAD). But Brooks has always been more of a muser than a tummler, and perhaps more depressive than he is manic. He asks us to banish the cha-cha-cha beat of conventional comedy from the mind and bend to a slower rhythm. His pace is not that of a comic standing up at a microphone barking one-liners but of an intelligent man sitting down by the fire mulling things over. And in this case, offering us a large slice of angel food for thought.

Bob Mondello, on NPR, said, "The result is not just his most mature comedy yet, but the best American comedy in years." J.Hoberman, in The Village Voice, called it "Pure pleasure. Funny, deft, impressive comedy."

The film was not a box office success, grossing about $16 million in the United States, with a budget of over $20 million. It received three Saturn Award nominations, for Best Actress (Meryl Streep), Best Fantasy Film, and Best Writing (Albert Brooks).

The American Film Institute recognized the film by nominating it for its AFI's 100 Years...100 Laughs award.

Regarding the response from fans over the years, Brooks told Rolling Stone, "I've gotten thousands and thousands of letters of people who had relatives that were dying, or they were dying themselves, and the movie made them feel better. I guess it's because it presents some possibility that doesn't involve clouds and ghostly images."

== Video releases ==
Defending Your Life was released on VHS and LaserDisc in October 1991. Warner Home Video released the film on DVD on April 3, 2001, in a cardboard snap case. It features 1.85:1 anamorphic widescreen formatting, subtitles in English, French, Spanish and Portuguese, cast and crew information, and the film's theatrical trailer. Warner re-released the film in 2008 in a two-pack DVD set with Brooks' Looking for Comedy in the Muslim World.

In December 2020, Warner Archive Collection re-released the movie on DVD. The Criterion Collection released it on Blu-ray on March 30, 2021, featuring a new 4K restoration supervised by Brooks himself.

== See also ==
- List of films about angels
- What Dreams May Come, a 1978 novel by Richard Matheson, adapted into a 1998 film of the same name starring Robin Williams, explores similar themes.
- Eternity (2025) explores similar themes.
