= Pat Broderick =

American comics artist

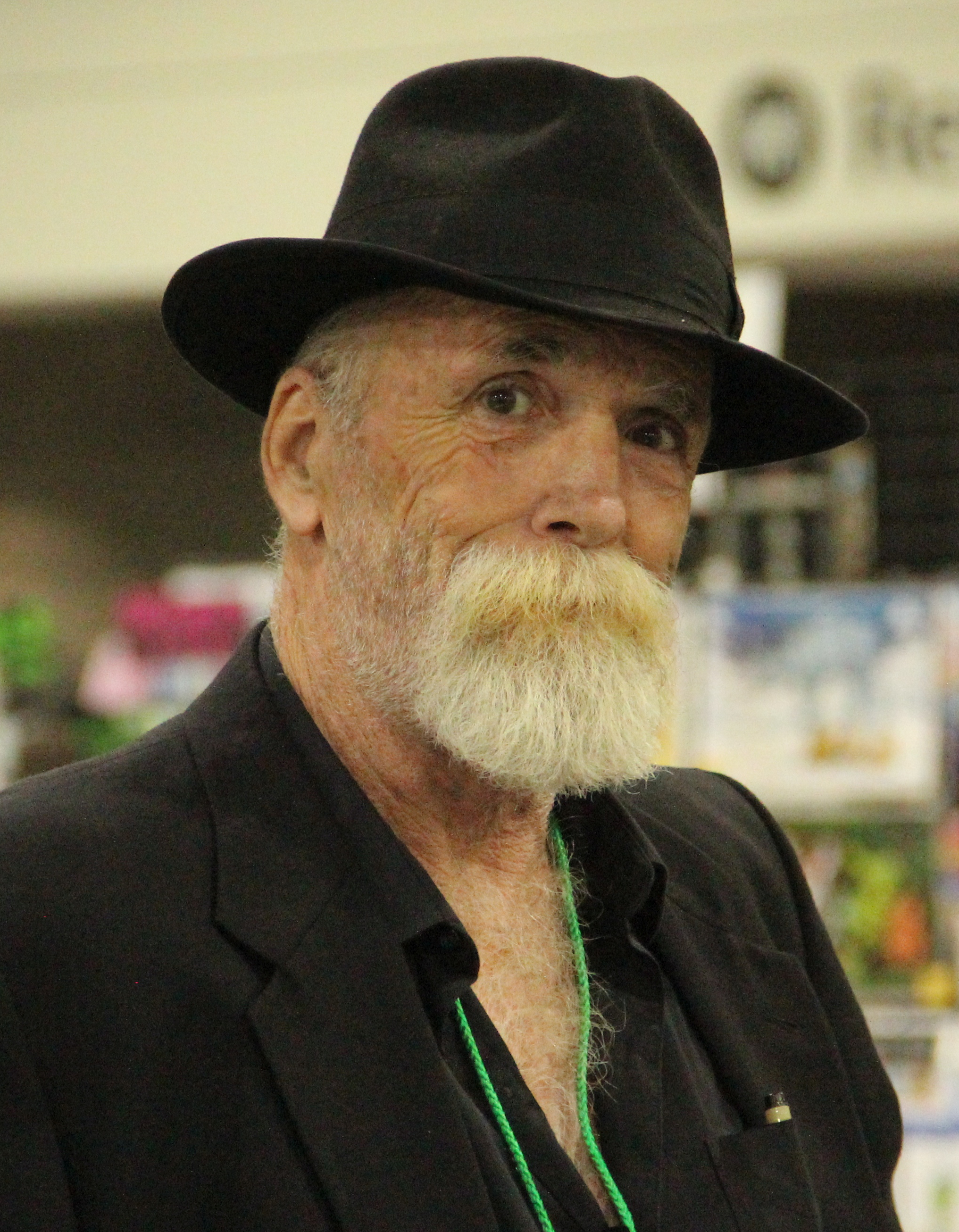
- Broderick in 2018
- Born: November 26, 1953 (age 72)
- Area: Penciller
- Notable works: "Batman: Year Three"; Captain Atom; Doom 2099; The Fury of Firestorm; Green Lantern; Micronauts; Swamp Thing

Pat Broderick (born November 26, 1953) is an American comics artist, known for his work on the Micronauts and Alpha Flight for Marvel Comics, and Legion of Super-Heroes, Captain Atom and Green Lantern for DC Comics. Broderick also pencilled the four-part "Batman: Year Three" storyline, written by Marv Wolfman, which detailed the first meeting of Batman and Dick Grayson as well as Tim Drake's first appearance.

== Career ==
=== Comics ===
Soon after graduating from high school in Tampa, Florida, Broderick flew to New York in the early 1970s to compete in DC Comics' junior bullpen program, a nationwide art and writing contest held at the July 4 convention at the Commodore Hotel. Presenting his work to DC editors Sol Harrison and Joe Orlando, Broderick was almost immediately placed in the junior bullpen program and drew filler pages and short stories for various 100 Page Super Spectaculars. During this period, Broderick also worked for Neal Adams and Dick Giordano's Continuity Associates as a member of the Crusty Bunkers.

In 1975, after sporadic work with DC and Marvel, Broderick joined the team at Atlas Comics. His time at Atlas was short-lived, and Broderick soon found himself back at Marvel, working on various titles for their black-and-white line, Curtis Magazines. This led to working on Captain Marvel and then The Micronauts. He drew the Micronauts series from #19 (July 1980) to #34 (Oct. 1981).

Writer J. M. DeMatteis and Broderick created the Creature Commandos in Weird War Tales #93 (November 1980). In 1981, he abruptly left Marvel for DC. As he said in a 2003 interview, "Jim Shooter had all but informed me that, in his opinion, my art sucked and that I would never get another raise there, regardless of how well my books were selling. So one quick phone call to DC and I was in." Broderick was one of the artists on the double-sized Justice League of America #200 (March 1982). He and writer Gerry Conway launched The Fury of Firestorm in June 1982. In 1984, Broderick drew the early issues of Sun Runners written by Roger McKenzie and published by Pacific Comics and Eclipse Comics Broderick briefly drew the Batman feature in Detective Comics in 1985. Captain Atom, a Charlton Comics character purchased by DC, was given an ongoing series in March 1987 which was written by Cary Bates and drawn by Broderick. Writer Marv Wolfman and Broderick created Tim Drake in the "Batman: Year Three" story. Broderick drew the Swamp Thing series from 1989 to 1990 and then launched the Green Lantern volume 3 series with Gerard Jones.

After ten years at DC, Broderick's relationship with that company soured. According to him, he "was being abused by [his] editors, Andy Helfer and Kevin Dooley, and was really just fed up with their attitude." Shooter was no longer at Marvel which offered him work again and Broderick returned, where he worked as the regular penciller first on Alpha Flight and Doom 2099.

=== Advertising ===
In 1995, Broderick turned to advertising full-time, moving to Dallas to lead the in-house creative department at Tracy Locke and Partnership. The company handled packaging, print, and television ads for PepsiCo, Frito-Lay, Pizza Hut, FedEx, Harrah's Casinos, and Hasbro. This led to design work for DNA Productions on the 2001 movie, Jimmy Neutron: Boy Genius.

=== Later career ===
In 2003, Broderick returned to comics with the short-lived Future Comics. He was scheduled to work on the title Peacekeepers, but it was never published, and Future went out of business shortly thereafter. In 2004, Devil's Due Publishing revived Micronauts, with Broderick returning to the title. He drew three issues before it was cancelled. That same year, Broderick was a member of the animation department faculty at Tampa's International Academy of Design and Technology.

Broderick was elected an Inkwell Awards Ambassador in January 2018. In August 2018, Broderick was elevated to Special Ambassador status. His term of service ended in May 2020.

== Art style ==
Broderick is known for his detailed, expressive art, and his characters' large eyes. There is some resemblance between Broderick's art and Michael Golden's late 1970s style. Broderick has acknowledged his admiration of Golden's work.

Through his career, Broderick has often teamed with inker Bruce Patterson on such titles as Alpha Flight, Green Lantern, Detective Comics, Legion of Super-Heroes, and Captain Planet and the Planeteers.

== Bibliography ==
=== Atlas/Seaboard Comics ===
- Blazing Battle Tales #1 (1975)
- Phoenix #3 (1975)
- Planet of Vampires #1–2 (1975)

=== DC Comics ===
- Batman #256–258; #436–439 (1974–1989)
- The Brave and the Bold #113–114 (three pages each) (1974)
- Captain Atom #1–19, 21–28, Annual #1–2 (1988–1989)
- COPS #1–2, 5–10, 13 (1988–1989)
- DC Science Fiction Graphic Novel #7 ("Sandkings" adaptation) (1987)
- Detective Comics #442 (one page); #490–491, 547–552 (1974–1985)
- The Flash #303–304 (1981)
- The Fury of Firestorm #1–7, 10–17, 22 (1982–1984)
- G.I. Combat #260 (1983)
- Green Lantern vol. 3 #1–8, 13, 19–24 (1990–1992)
- House of Mystery #226 (three pages) (1974)
- Justice League of America #111 (three pages); #200 (1974–1982)
- Legion of Super-Heroes vol. 2 #284–287, 309 (1982–1984)
- Legion of Super-Heroes vol. 3 #46–47, 49 (1988)
- Lords of the Ultra-Realm #1–6, Special #1 (1986–1987)
- New Guardians #10–12 (1989)
- The New Teen Titans vol. 2 #35 (1987)
- Ragman vol. 2 #1–8 (1991–1992)
- Secret Origins vol. 3 #9 (2015)
- Shazam! #13 (four pages) (1974)
- Swamp Thing vol. 2 #90–93, 95–97, 99–100, Annual #4 (1988–1990)
- Sword of the Atom Special #3 (1988)
- The Unexpected #218 (1982)
- Warlord #79, Annual #4 (1984–1985)
- Weird War Tales #93, 107–108 (1980–1982)
- Who's Who in the DC Universe #3–7, 11, 14 (1990–1991)
- Who's Who in the Legion of Super-Heroes #1 (1988)
- Who's Who: The Definitive Directory of the DC Universe #2–5, 7, 16 (1985–1986)
- Who's Who: Update '87 #1–2, 4 (1987)
- Who's Who Update '88 #1, 4 (1988)
- The Witching Hour #81 (1978)
- World's Finest Comics #225 (one page) (1974)

==== Milestone Media ====
- Blood Syndicate #32 (1995)

==== Paradox Press ====
- The Big Book of Bad (1998)
- The Big Book of Conspiracies (1995)
- The Big Book of Little Criminals (1996)
- The Big Book of the Weird Wild West (1998)
- The Big Book of Urban Legends (1994)

=== Devil's Due Publishing ===
- Micronauts vol 2 #1–3 (2004)

=== Eclipse Comics ===
- Sun Runners #4–5 (1984–1985)

=== Marvel Comics ===
- Alpha Flight #109–112, 114–120, 122–124, Special #1 (1992–1993)
- Battlestar Galactica #10 (1979)
- Captain Marvel #55–62 (1978–1979)
- Captain Planet and the Planeteers #3–4 (1991–1992)
- Crazy Magazine #68–69, 75, 77 (1980–1981)
- Deadly Hands of Kung Fu #18, 25 (1975–1976)
- Deathlok Annual #1 (1992)
- Doom 2099 #1–8, 10–12, 14–15, 17–30 (1993–1995)
- Haunt of Horror #3 (1974)
- Marvel Comics Presents #118 (1992)
- Marvel Fanfare #25–26 (Weirdworld) (1986)
- Marvel Holiday Special #3 (1994)
- Marvel Premiere #23–24 (Iron Fist) (1975)
- Marvel Spotlight vol. 2 #1–3 (Captain Marvel) (1979)
- Marvel Team-Up #91 (1980)
- Master of Kung Fu #70 (1978)
- Micronauts #19–34 (1980–1981)
- Punisher vol. 3 #5–6 (1996)
- Quasar #30 (1992)
- Red Sonja vol. 3 #5–6 (1985)
- Rom: Spaceknight Annual #1 (1982)
- The Sensational Spider-Man '96 #1 (1996)
- Spider-Man #62 (1995)
- Spider-Man and X-Factor: Shadowgames #1–3 (1994)
- Unknown Worlds of Science Fiction #6 (one page) (1975)
- What If...? #19 (Spider-Man) (1980)

=== Pacific Comics ===
- Sun Runners #1–2 (1984)

=== Shadow House Press ===
- Shadow House #1–5 (1997–1998)

Comic book series
| Preceded by George Tuska | Captain Marvel penciller 1978–1979 | Succeeded by n/a |
| Preceded by Howard Chaykin | Micronauts penciller 1980–1981 | Succeeded by Val Mayerik |
| Preceded by n/a | The Fury of Firestorm penciller 1982–1984 | Succeeded by Rafael Kayanan |
| Preceded by Gene Colan | Detective Comics penciller 1985 | Succeeded by Klaus Janson |
| Preceded by n/a | Captain Atom penciller 1987–1989 | Succeeded by Rafael Kayanan |
| Preceded by Jim Aparo | Batman penciller 1989 | Succeeded by Jim Aparo |
| Preceded by Thomas Yeates | Swamp Thing vol. 2 penciller 1989–1990 | Succeeded by Mike Hoffman |
| Preceded by n/a | Green Lantern vol. 3 penciller 1990–1992 | Succeeded by Joe Staton |
| Preceded by Tom Morgan | Alpha Flight penciller 1992–1993 | Succeeded by Jim Reddington |
| Preceded by n/a | Doom 2099 penciller 1993–1995 | Succeeded by David G. Klein |
