= Batman: Year Three =

Storyline

- Cover of Batman 436 (Early Aug 1989), art by George Pérez
- Publisher: DC Comics
- Publication date: August – September 1989
- Genre: Superhero
- Title(s): Batman #436–439
- Main character(s): Batman; Nightwing; Boss Zucco; Tim Drake

Creative team
- Writer: Marv Wolfman
- Penciller: Pat Broderick
- Inker: John Beatty

"Batman: Year Three" is a comic book storyline published by DC Comics, which explores Batman's third year as a crimefighter. It was written by Marv Wolfman and pencilled by Pat Broderick and originally appeared in Batman #436–439 (Aug – Sept 1989), which were published semi-monthly and featured covers by George Pérez.

The plot involved the origin of the first Robin and his initial interactions with Batman. It also includes sequences set in the (when it was originally published) contemporary 1989 Batman continuity, a period in which Batman recovers from the recent death of the second Robin (Jason Todd), Dick Grayson (the original Robin) returns to Gotham City after a long absence and Boss Zucco (the individual responsible for the death of Grayson's parents) is paroled. Additionally, the storyline features the first appearance of Tim Drake, who would later become the third Robin.

The story is a sequel of sorts to the previous "Batman: Year One" and "Batman: Year Two" storylines (which were all edited by Dennis O'Neil, but produced by different creative teams) and is the last in the sequence. Unlike its predecessors Batman: Year Three had not been collected in a standalone trade paperback, though it can be found as part of Batman: The Caped Crusader Vol. 2. However, in early 2025 it was announced that the storyline would be collected in a hardcover "Deluxe Edition" and releasing in August of that year.

== Storyline ==
The story begins when Batman is watching a mob boss. Then, a helicopter flies in and attempts to gun Batman down. Batman is able to chase the helicopter but fails to capture the people in it. Later, Dick Grayson is in the Batcave looking at some of his and Bruce Wayne's investigations, during his time as the first Robin. He then realizes that Bruce had gotten rid of everything that had to do with Jason Todd, due to his apparent demise. Later, in the Gotham Municipal Court House, lawyers are discussing Anthony Zucco and Dick Grayson's childhood, debating whether or not they should release him. Then, Dick finds out that Alfred Pennyworth fears for Bruce's sanity. He immediately dons the Nightwing costume to find Batman.
