= Tim Drake =

DC Comics character

- Tim Drake on the cover of Robin: A Hero Reborn trade paperback (January 1991). Art by Brian Bolland.

Publication information
- Publisher: DC Comics
- First appearance: As Tim Drake: Batman #436 (August 1989); As Robin: Batman #442 (December 1989); As Red Robin: Red Robin #1 (August 2009)
- Created by: Marv Wolfman (writer); Pat Broderick (artist)

In-story information
- Full name: Timothy Jackson Drake
- Species: Human
- Team affiliations: Batman family Teen Titans; Young Justice; Batman Incorporated; Justice League
- Partnerships: Batman; Dick Grayson; Spoiler/Batgirl; Superboy (Conner Kent); Wonder Girl; Kid Flash; Static; Batgirl/Black Bat; Sparrow; Blue Beetle
- Notable aliases: Robin; Red Robin; Batman; Drake
- Abilities: Genius-level intellect; Expert martial artist and hand-to-hand combatant; Highly skilled acrobat and gymnast; Skilled detective; Master strategist, tactician, and field commander; Proficient in utilizing high-tech equipment and weapons

Timothy Jackson "Tim" Drake is a superhero appearing in American comic books published by DC Comics, commonly in association with the superhero Batman. Created by Marv Wolfman and Pat Broderick, he first appeared in Batman #436 (August 1989) as the third character to assume the role of Batman's crime-fighting partner and sidekick Robin. Following the events of Batman: Battle for the Cowl in 2009, he adopted the identity of Red Robin. In 2019, Tim returned to his original Robin persona and briefly used the mononym "Drake".

As a young boy, Tim was in the audience the night Dick Grayson's parents were murdered, and later managed to discover the identities of Batman and the original Robin through their exploits. Following the death of the second Robin, Jason Todd, and after witnessing Batman spiral into darkness, Tim attempted to convince Dick to resume the role of Robin, stating that "Batman needs a Robin". However, Dick refused to return to being Batman's sidekick, so Tim was appointed as the third Robin instead. Neal Adams redesigned the entire Robin costume specifically for Tim Drake's character, with the sole exception of the redesigned "R" logo by Norm Breyfogle.

Subsequent stories emphasize Tim's superior detective skills compared to the previous two Robins, which make him more similar to Batman. He led his own superhero team, Young Justice, and later succeeded Dick as the leader of the Teen Titans. He was briefly followed in the role of Robin by Stephanie Brown, and later for a longer period by Batman's biological son, Damian Wayne, during the time Tim operated as Red Robin. Tim has been shown to have a close friendship with Superboy. Tim's most high-profile romantic pairing has been with fellow superhero and Robin Stephanie Brown.

In 2011, Tim Drake was ranked 32nd in IGN's Top 100 Comic Book Heroes. He has also been featured in various adaptations, including several television series, such as those set in the DCAU, Young Justice (2010–2022), and Titans (2018–2023), as well as the Batman: Arkham video game series.

== Publication history ==
Tim Drake was created to succeed Jason Todd as Robin after DC killed off Todd in their story A Death in the Family. Named after Tim Burton, director of the then-upcoming 1989 film, Tim first appeared in 1989's Batman: Year Three by writer Marv Wolfman and penciler Pat Broderick, before having his origin detailed in Batman: A Lonely Place of Dying, a crossover story between the ongoing series Batman and New Titans, written by Wolfman and penciled by George Pérez and Jim Aparo (the latter with inks by Mike DeCarlo), in which he first introduced himself to Dick Grayson and impressed the former Robin with his skills. This led Grayson and later Alfred Pennyworth, Bruce Wayne's butler, to support Tim's request to be Batman's new partner. Not wanting to make the same mistake as he did with Jason Todd, Batman had Tim endure an intensive period of training that was never given to his predecessors. As such, Tim remained a non-superhero supporting character for the first year of his regular appearances in the Batman title, mainly operating in the Batcave.

According to Wolfman, Tim was created to stand out from Grayson and Todd by having high intellect, a strong sense of justice and family outside of Batman's own.

The ensuing Tim Drake storylines, authored by Alan Grant and penciled by Norm Breyfogle, coupled with the 1989 release of Burton's Batman, spurred sales of both Batman and Detective Comics. For the latter title, Grant attested in 2007 that "when the Batman movie came out, the sales went up, if I recall correctly, from around 75,000 to about 675,000." 1989-90 was indeed the "Year of the Bat:" Capital and Diamond City Distributors reported that the Year One-inspired Batman: Legends of the Dark Knight dominated four out of the five spots for preorders (not total sales and second printings). The only exception was the third preorder spot, snagged by Batman #442, the conclusion to Tim Drake's "A Lonely Place of Dying" storyline. The "Year of the Bat" continued into the first half of 1990. Preorders for Batman and Detective Comics issues featuring a revived Joker and Penguin began to compete with, and even edged out, the last three parts of Grant Morrison's and Klaus Janson's Gothic storyline in Legends. Todd McFarlane's Spider-Man arrived in the second half of 1990, inaugurating six months of Spidermania (or Mcfarlamania, depending on the reader). DC closed out 1990 with vendors under-ordering issues, prompting the publisher to push Batman #457 and the first part of the Robin mini-series into second and then third printings. The next year, 1991, witnessed the ascension of Chris Claremont's, Jim Lee's, and Scott Williams's X-Men against Magneto, as well as Fabian Nicieza's and Rob Liefeld's X-Force, into the top of the preorder rankings. The only exception to this X-mania was, again, Tim Drake and the sequel to the Robin miniseries, the first variant issue of which garnered the third spot, firmly wedged between variant issues of X-Force and X-Men. The mini-series pitted solo Robin against the Joker, in response to fan demands for a matchup since "A Death in the Family". The 1990s comics booming bust had begun. In a supplemental interview with Daniel Best, Alan Grant added that "every issue from about that time [after the 'Year of the Bat'] that featured Robin sales went up because Robin did have his fans." Although both Grant and Breyfogle initially believed that their Anarky character could potentially become the third version of Robin, they were quick to support the editorial decision to focus on Drake. The social anarchist duo adopted the character as their own in the early 1990s, during Grant's shift to libertarian socialism but before his late 1990s emphasis on Neo Tech. Breyfogle agreed that "it was a big thing to bring in the new Robin, yes. I know my fans often point specifically to that double-page splash where his costume first appears as a big event for them as fans and I usually have to point out to them that Neal Adams was the one who designed the costume. The 'R' symbol and the staff were all that was mine." In the "Rite of Passage" storyline for Detective Comics, Grant and Breyfogle intertwined Drake matching wits with Anarky; a criminal and anthropological investigation into an apocryphal Haitian Vodou cult (revealed by Batman, asserting anthropological and investigative authority, as a front for extortion and crony capitalism); the murder of Drake's mother by vilified cult leaders; the beginning of Drake's recurrent nightmares and trauma; as well as the perspective of a child of one of the cult's Haitian followers, unknowingly and inadvertently orphaned by Batman at the end of the four-issue arc.

Tim Drake eventually transitioned from preadolescence to adolescence, becoming the third Robin throughout the storylines "Rite of Passage" and "Identity Crisis", with all issues scripted by Alan Grant and penciled by Norm Breyfogle. Story arcs that included Drake only in subplots or featured his training in criminal investigation, such as "Crimesmith" and "The Penguin Affair", were either written or co-written by Grant and Wolfman, with pencils by Breyfogle, Aparo, and M. D. Bright. Immediately afterwards, the character starred in the five-issue miniseries Robin, written by Chuck Dixon, with interior pencils by Tom Lyle and cover art by Brian Bolland. The new Batman and Robin team went on their first official mission together in the story "Debut", again written by Grant and penciled by Breyfogle. Lauren R. O'Connor contends that, in early Tim Drake appearances, writers such as Grant and Chuck Dixon "had a lexicon of teenage behavior from which to draw, unlike when Dick Grayson was introduced and the concept of the teenager was still nascent. They wisely mobilized the expected adolescent behaviors of parental conflict, hormonal urges, and identity formation to give Tim emotional depth and complexity, making him a relatable character with boundaries between his two selves." In the Robin ongoing series, when Drake had fully transitioned into an adolescent character, Chuck Dixon depicted him as engaging in adolescent intimacy, yet still stopped short at overt heterosexual consummation. This narrative benchmark maintained Robin's "estrangement from sex" that began in the Grayson years. Erica McCrystal likewise observes that Alan Grant, prior to Dixon's series, connected Drake to Batman's philosophy of heroic or anti-heroic "vigilantism" as "therapeutic for children of trauma. But this kind of therapy has a delicate integration process." The overcoming of trauma entailed distinct identity intersections and emotional restraint, as well as a "complete understanding" of symbol and self. Bruce Wayne, a former child of trauma and survivor guilt, guided "other trauma victims down a path of righteousness." Tim Drake, for example, endured trauma and "emotional duress" as a result of the death of his mother (his father was in a coma and on a ventilator). Drake contemplated the idea of fear, and overcoming it, in both the "Rite of Passage" and "Identity Crisis" storylines. Grant and Breyfogle subjected Drake to recurrent nightmares, from hauntings by a ghoulish Batman to the disquieting lullaby (or informal nursery rhyme), "My Mummy's dead...My Mummy's Dead...I can't get it through my head," echoing across a cemetery for deceased parents. Drake ultimately defeated his preadolescent fears "somewhat distant from Bruce Wayne" and "not as an orphan." By the end of "Identity Crisis", an adolescent Drake had "proven himself as capable of being a vigilante" by deducing the role of fear in instigating a series of violent crimes.

As the character continued to appear in the main Batman titles, the original Robin miniseries was followed by the four-issue miniseries Robin II: The Joker's Wild!(December 1991-February 1992) and the six-issue miniseries Robin III: Cry of the Huntress (December 1992-March 1993) both also written by Dixon. Due to the success of these miniseries, DC launched the first ongoing monthly Robin series in its history, once again written by Dixon, with Tim Drake as its main adolescent character. The ongoing series continued for over 15 years, ending with issue #183. Mike Mullins on Newsarama has stated:

Throughout [the entire Robin series], the character of Robin has been captured consistently, showing him to step up to greater and greater challenges. Robin is a character who shows initiative and is driven to do what he views as right. He knows he is living up to a legacy left by Dick Grayson and strives to not disappoint Bruce Wayne, Batman. Tim is a more natural detective than previous Robins and is talented with computers, which allows him to stand in his unique spotlight. Unlike his predecessors, Tim is not the most proficient combatant and has had to work on his fighting technique, taking up the bo staff to give him an edge that Batman does not need. Tim almost always seeks to analyze a problem and outthink his opponent but has shown the ability to win a fight when necessary.

During this period, the character also featured prominently in the comic series Young Justice, written by Peter David, as a core team member from 1998 to 2003. Subsequently, Tim Drake also became a prominent team member in the new incarnation of Teen Titans written by Geoff Johns, from 2003 to 2011.

The ongoing series Robin (vol. 4) was written by Chuck Dixon until issue #100, in which the series was handed off to Jon Lewis. Lewis's run as a writer concluded with issue #120. Bill Willingham wrote the series for issues #121-147. As part of DC Comics' "One Year Later" relaunch initiative, in which the events of all ongoing titles skipped forward one year, Adam Beechen took over as writer on Robin with issue #148. Later, a return to the title by Dixon was aborted abruptly upon his departure from DC again. The final nine issues of the series were written by Fabian Nicieza, tying into the then-ongoing "Batman R.I.P." storyline.

Following the miniseries Batman: Battle For the Cowl, Tim Drake took on the new identity of the Red Robin as the character Damian Wayne was made the new Robin. The character began starring in a new Red Robin ongoing series, written for its first twelve issues by Christopher Yost and thereafter by Fabian Nicieza. The series was canceled along with the rest of DC's publishing line for The New 52 reboot.

In The New 52 period, Tim Drake primarily appeared as a main character in the Teen Titans series, with some guest appearances in the Batman titles, under the superhero name Red Robin. Tim was also the main character in the 26-issue weekly series Batman and Robin Eternal alongside the other former Robins. Meanwhile, a version of Tim from five years into the future was also a main character in the weekly series The New 52: Futures End; this alternate-future version of Tim would become the title character in the subsequent Batman Beyond series up until its relaunch with DC Rebirth.

As of the DC Rebirth relaunch, Tim Drake became the main character in the series Detective Comics written by James Tynion IV where it was reinvented as a team book. The character featured in issues #934-940 and #965-981, with some flashback appearances in the interim.

The character has subsequently become a main character in the relaunched Young Justice series written by Brian Michael Bendis.

The character received widespread media attention when it was revealed that he was bisexual in DC's relaunch initiative Infinite Frontier through Batman: Urban Legends #6 (August 2021), written by Meghan Fitzmartin. This reveal made Tim notable for being one of the most prominent LGBT characters in comic books. He subsequently received a story in DC Pride 2022 and his own Tim Drake: Pride Special before DC announced a new ongoing series written by Fitzmartin. The series, Tim Drake: Robin, launched on September 27, 2022 and ran for 10 issues, ending on June 27, 2023. He also was concurrently a main character in the series Batman written by Chip Zdarsky. He was featured in issues starting from #125, and in "The Toy Box" backup story starting from issue #131.

Tim Drake: Robin received a nomination for Outstanding Comic Book at the 34th GLAAD Media Awards.

== Fictional character biography ==
=== Introduction ===
Tim Drake is the son of Jack Drake and Janet Drake, coming from the same social class as Bruce Wayne. When he was a young child, he visited the circus for the first time with his parents. The Drakes asked the Flying Graysons for a photo together, resulting in a momentary bond between Tim and Dick Grayson as they met for the first time. Dick Grayson's parents were murdered that night, as witnessed by Tim from the audience.

Growing up, Tim's parents were frequently absent for months at a time as they traveled around the world on archaeological digs and thus he was left in a boarding school with relatively little adult supervision. By the age of nine, Tim, who had a very sharp intellect, had deduced the identities of Batman and Robin as Bruce Wayne and Dick Grayson, after witnessing a gymnastic maneuver by Robin that he previously saw Grayson display in the Haly Circus. Inspired by the heroes' exploits, Tim trained himself in martial arts, acrobatics, detective skills, and scholastics to better himself both physically and intellectually, though having no intention of joining Batman one day, mainly for his self-fulfillment. When Tim reached the age of thirteen, he saw that Batman had grown reckless and violent following the second Robin (Jason Todd)'s murder by the Joker. Reasoning that "Batman needs a Robin", Tim at first approached Dick Grayson – who had since become Nightwing – to ask him to become Robin again. Dick refused, but Tim's actions in an encounter with Two-Face prompted him and Alfred Pennyworth to see Tim as a potential third Robin. Batman agreed to mentor Tim, train him, and use his assistance in the Batcave, but at first refused to involve Tim in the field out of concern for the boy's safety, not wanting a repeat of Jason's fate. After a series of events culminating in Tim's mother's death, his father's paralysis, and Tim rescuing Batman in an encounter with the Scarecrow, Batman eventually enlisted him as the third Robin at the age of fourteen.

=== Robin (vol. 2) (1989–2009) ===
Before joining Batman as the third Robin, Tim Drake was given a modern redesign of the Robin costume and sent to train abroad with numerous experts to refine his martial arts. When Bruce Wayne retires after Knightfall, Robin goes solo to defend Gotham City. Robin would eventually go on to co-star with other teenaged superheroes in Young Justice and Teen Titans. He also made guest appearances in other DC comic books such as Nightwing and Azrael.

Robin would also become increasingly closer to fellow teen vigilante Stephanie Brown, also known as the Spoiler. Although at first, he regarded her as reckless in operating without Batman's guidance, the two would eventually become romantically involved. For a brief period when Tim's father found out about him being Robin and he retired from the role, Stephanie temporarily replaced him as the new Robin.

Following the death of his father in Identity Crisis (2004) and the presumed death of Stephanie in Batman: War Games (2004–2005), Tim relocated to Blüdhaven, the city where Nightwing fights crime, for a period of time to escape the "ghosts" of Gotham City and to stay close to his stepmother Dana Winters, who was admitted into a Blüdhaven clinic after going into psychological shock over Captain Boomerang killing Jack Drake.

Tim Drake was then given another redesign of the Robin costume with a red and black color scheme. The colors are those of Superboy's costume, in tribute to Superboy following his death in Infinite Crisis (2005).

Once Dick takes over the role of Batman after Bruce's apparent death in Batman R.I.P. and Final Crisis, he fires Tim from the Robin mantle and gives it to Damian Wayne, due to Dick believing he and Tim are equals. Tim, believing that Bruce is still alive, assumes the identity of Red Robin and leaves Gotham City to go on a worldwide search for Wayne.

=== Red Robin (2009–2011) ===
Red Robin, which was launched in late 2009, depicted Tim Drake's search to find evidence that Bruce Wayne was still alive after cutting himself off from the rest of the Bat-family. He was approached by Ra's al Ghul's assassins, who were also interested in finding out what happened to Batman. At the same time, Tamara "Tam" Fox, Lucius Fox's daughter, has been sent to find Tim Drake to bring him back to Gotham. Tim goes to Iraq and manages to discover definitive proof that Bruce was alive and lost in time, but was ambushed by an assassin from the Council of Spiders. He manages to drive himself and Pru (one of the assassins working for Ra's al Ghul, who had become an ally of Tim's) to Tam's hotel room, and they are promptly abducted by the League of Assassins.

Although initially reluctant, Tim Drake allied with Ra's before nearly bleeding to death due to their encounter with the Council of Spiders. He was put in charge of the League of Assassins by Ra's and used the time to simultaneously plan how to stop the Council of Spiders and destroy the League of Assassins. After failing to foil all but one of the Council's assassination attempts, Tim realizes that the Council will be attacking the League's base, and realizes that he left Tam in danger at the base. Rushing back to base, he simultaneously manages to delay the Council of Spiders, blow up the League's base, and escape with Tam.

After crippling Ra's' League of Assassins, Drake returns to Gotham City to overthrow Ra's' plans to use Hush (surgically altered to resemble Bruce Wayne) to gain control of the Wayne family resources and destroy all that Batman held dear by directing his assassins to target all of the Batman's associates. Realizing that these attacks are a smokescreen and that the real target is coercing Hush to sign away Wayne Enterprises, Red Robin decides to confront Ra's head-on. He calls upon all of his friends to protect the various targets. Drake has since moved back to Gotham City and reestablished ties with his family and friends.

After Bruce Wayne's return, Tim begins to aid his plans for expanding their mission globally with Batman, Inc. Tim is eventually appointed as the head of the newest incarnation of the Outsiders that now serve as Batman Inc.'s black-ops wing. Red Robin eventually rejoins the Teen Titans and takes over leadership from Wonder Girl. He remains the team's leader during their climactic battle against Superboy-Prime and the new Legion of Doom.

Following an adventure with the Black Bat where he faces Ra's al Ghul's sister, Tim stalks and attempts to kill a revived Captain Boomerang during the Brightest Day. Though Tim ultimately stops himself from killing Boomerang, he is chastised by Batman for his actions.

=== The New 52 (2011–2016) ===
In September 2011, The New 52 rebooted DC's continuity. In this new timeline, Teen Titans (vol. 4) #0 revealed Tim Drake's new origin, showing a large departure from his original origin, removing his connections to Dick Grayson's origin story. In The New 52, Tim is a talented athlete and computer genius who comes close to discovering Batman's identity, but never totally figures it out. When Tim finds the Batman and gets rejected for the role of sidekick, he decides to bring the Batman to him, by hacking the Penguin's bank account and donating millions of dollars, thus putting his family in danger. The Penguin's goons come after Tim and his family, but Batman saves them. Tim's parents are forced to go into witness protection, but they believe Tim deserves better and ask Bruce to take care of him for them. The Witness Protection Program renames him "Tim Drake", and he takes on the identity of the "Red Robin", rather than that of "Robin", out of respect to Jason Todd. In later issues, he is shown to be a founding member of the Teen Titans as well as their leader and he shows feelings for Wonder Girl which are reciprocated.

Tim was unwilling to meet with the rest of the Bat-family at the Batcave after he was infected with the Joker's new compound "HA". He was present when Damian was killed by the Heretic and admitted to Bruce that even though he had a dysfunctional relationship with Damian that he did grieve for him. He was also at the final battle between Batman and the Heretic when Talia killed her son's clone and blew up Wayne Tower.

Tim was also part of the Bat-family's assembled team which went to Apokolips to retrieve Damian's body. As their mission focused on retrieving Robin, Tim, Jason, and Barbara wore costumes that resembled Damian's colors and each wore a Robin symbol. Following the completion of their mission and the revival of Damian, he handed him the Robin symbol on his suit to welcome Damian back to life and the role of Robin.

In the pre-Convergence timeline of Futures End, refugees from Earth-2 are given a signal from Brother Eye, which allows them into the Earth-0 Universe, but start a war when Darkseid follows them, leading to the deaths of the Teen Titans, except for Drake. Tim abandons his Red Robin mantle and becomes a bartender until an attack by Brainiac, where changes to the timeline are made. Brainiac is captured, and Terry McGinnis dies at the hands of Brother Eye's Batman-Joker hybrid. Tim dons Terry's suit, travels back in time, and prevents Brother Eye from sending the signal to Earth-2, creating a new future. Tim is launched into the new future, 35 years later, where he becomes the new Batman and destroys a weakened Brother Eye.

=== DC Rebirth (2016–2021) ===
In DC Rebirth, Tim Drake still operates under the Red Robin alias. He gains a new and third overall Red Robin suit similar to his first Robin suit except with two "R"s as his logo instead of one. It is revealed later on in Detective Comics #965 that Tim Drake's origin story has reverted to that of the original universe, where he discovers Batman and Robin's identities after Jason Todd's death and became Robin before adopting the Red Robin persona.

Tim is primarily featured in Detective Comics as part of Batman and Batwoman's new team in Gotham, along with Orphan, Spoiler, and Clayface. Batman and Batwoman were preparing this group to combat enemies known as the Colonists, later revealed to be a military group under the command of Batwoman's father, Jacob Kane, who have modeled themselves after Batman in a more violent matter. After the team rescues Batman and Tim hacks their database to discover their plans, Jake sends two waves of Bat-Drones to take down the "League of Shadows", which will kill hundreds of innocents in the process. As his teammates evacuate the locations the drones were sent to, Tim hacks the drone's mission directive to make himself the sole target, knowing that the drones will stop once the target is eliminated.

While Tim manages to take down the first wave of drones, he is killed apparently by the second wave, devastating the Bat-family and his former Teen Titans teammates. However, just before Tim was blasted by the second wave, he is teleported to an unknown place by Mr. Oz and kept prisoner. Tim swore that his friends will find him.

Later, Batman learns from Ascalon, a robotic entity created by the Order of St. Dumas, that Tim is still alive, with Batman resolving to find Tim.

In Mr. Oz's prison, Tim is forced to relive his memories of the past. Realizing that Oz is using Kryptonian technology, Tim easily hacks into it and frees himself as Oz reveals himself to be Jor-El and disappears. As he tries to find a way out, Tim finds Batman but discovers this version of Batman is Tim Drake from the Titans Tomorrow future. Unable to accept a future where he decides to become Batman, Tim is forced to aid his older self in evading and containing a freed Doomsday. Tim learns from his future self that Dick, Jason, and Damian all tried to be Batman, but either retired or was forced to be put down by Tim (in the case of Damian). After Doomsday is lured back to his cell, both Tims teleport out of Jor-El's prison and arrive in Gotham in the Titans Tomorrow future. Before being sent back, Tim is asked by his future self to apologize to Conner Kent, but the younger Tim has no idea who Conner is, although he later admits that the name is tugging at his heart, though he does not know why. Tim is incapacitated by his future self, as the latter decides to go back in time to kill Batwoman, the apparent cause of Tim becoming Batman. Tim returns to Gotham and is reunited with the Bat-family, but warns them about future Tim.

After a battle with Ulysses Armstrong and Brother Eye, Tim leaves Gotham to investigate the alternate timelines, and Tim's restored memories of his past friends from Young Justice. This leads him to Metropolis, where he is reunited with Wonder Girl and Impulse, and meets Teen Lantern and Jinny Hex. The five young heroes later travel to Gemworld, where they are reunited with Superboy and meet Princess Amethyst. Soon lost in the multiverse, Young Justice struggles to return home, with Tim taking on the new identity of Drake during an attack by his Earth-3 counterpart. However, this identity was retired shortly after returning to his universe, and Tim returned to being Robin.

=== Infinite Frontier (2021–2023) ===
Following Infinite Frontier, Tim's history is smoothed over again, restoring his pre-New 52 histories as Batman's third apprentice and re-establishing him as having been Robin since that time. In Batman: Urban Legends, it is revealed that he and Stephanie Brown broke up off-panel and he reconnected with a friend from high school, Bernard Dowd. Bernard is kidnapped, sending Tim on a rescue mission while still trying to understand what he truly desires from life. During the rescue, Bernard tells Robin that his friend Tim helped him come out and understand himself, prompting Robin/Tim to realize his own identity as a bisexual man. Afterward, out of costume, Bernard asks Tim on a date, which Tim accepts. Tim would later tell Bruce (and the rest of the Batman Family off panel) about his breakup with Stephanie and new relationship with Bernard before moving to the Gotham marina on his own. Tim Drake plays a minor role in assisting Batman during the "Joker War" and "Fear State" events.

In Tim Drake: Robin, Tim lives on a house boat while working to forge his own path away from Batman. However, shortly after his move, Tim/Robin gets framed for a crime he didn't commit while investigating a series of murders happening to the marina residents. He works with Darcy Thomas/Sparrow (a former initiate in the We Are Robins movement) and Detective Williams to find the real culprit. But this is made more difficult by the appearance of glowing animals and mudlike creatures that take the form of trusted friends and family. Tim ultimately realizes that all these events are linked to a villain obsessed with him, with things coming to a head when Bernard gets kidnapped. Tim confronts the villain, a metahuman who uses the codename Moriarty and who dubs themselves Tim's nemesis. Tim defeats Moriarty and saves Bernard, and the couple confirm their commitment to each other.

In the main Batman comics written by Chip Zdarsky, Tim Drake learns the existence of Failsafe (a robot that Zur-En-Arrh created in case Batman killed someone) and meets Zur-En-Arrh for the first time. He tries assisting Batman as well as Zur-En-Arrh (who temporarily took over Batman's body), but watches helplessly as Failsafe teleports Batman to a different universe. Tim Drake goes through multiple universes, and finally rescues Batman. He comes into conflict with Batman when Batman starts being aggressive toward his enemies, and fights Damian Wayne. He is temporarily captured by the villains, but escapes and helps Batman save the day. Tim Drake finds Bruce Wayne again after he escapes from his prison, and convinces Bruce to open up and rely on his family again. Tim Drake helps Batman and the Bat-family rescue Damian and defeat Zur-En-Arrh. Bruce Wayne builds a new home for the Bat-family calling it the Pennyworth Manor as a new base after regaining his money.

== Characterization ==
Tim Drake's character has been officially described as being a "self-made" hero who adopted the role of Robin following Jason Todd's death, is a fan of the Batman/Robin duo enough, and is noted for his compassion as a superhero. Additionally, he is described as possessing an analytical mind and highly intelligent, his detective abilities comparable to Batman.

== Skills and abilities ==
Similar to Batman, Tim Drake possess no inherent super-powers and instead relies of a combination of physical abilities and technology; As Robin, Tim Drake underwent training from numerous characters (Batman primarily, Dick Grayson, Henri Ducard, Cassandra Cain, and Lady Shiva). Due to this training, he is proficient in numerous martial arts: Aikido, Karate, Boxing, Judo, Kung Fu, Tai Chi, Krav Maga, and esoteric Tibetian martial styles which include healing arts (which utilize pressure points). In battle, he also favors a bo staff. These abilities would improve as Red Robin, making him an expert martial artist.

Compared to Batman's other male proteges ("Robins"), the character's analytical mind and intelligence is highlighted; considered a genius with an IQ of 142, he is considered a highly apt detective that allows skills in and forensic science and criminology, highly skilled in computer operation and hacking, and is knowledgeable in various fields of science; he displayed knowledge in biology, engineering, and genetics apt enough to attempt at re-cloning Superboy and designing one of the Bat-Family's base-of-operations. He is considered a natural leader, having led various teams, and is fluent in several other languages including Cantonese, Russian, Spanish and German.

== Costumes ==
Tim Drake's original Robin costume had a red torso, yellow stitching and belt, black boots, green short sleeves, gloves, and pants. He wore a cape made of Kevlar and Nomex that was black on the outside and yellow on the inside. This costume was different from that of his predecessors in that it provided increased protection with an armored tunic and gorget, long boots, an emergency "R" shuriken on his chest in addition to the traditional batarangs and a collapsible bo staff as the character's primary weapon.

Following Infinite Crisis and 52, Tim Drake modified his costume to favor a mostly red and black color scheme in tribute to his friend Superboy (Kon-El), who died fighting Earth-Prime's Superboy. This Robin costume had a red torso, long sleeves, and pants, with a cape that was black on the outside and yellow on the inside. It also had yellow stitching and a matching belt, a black domino mask, gloves, and boots. It bears a striking resemblance to Bob Kane's unused design for Batman.

Tim Drake resumed the motif of a red and black costume when he took on the identity of the Red Robin. The Red Robin costume consisted of a long-sleeved red tunic, along with black boots, tights, gloves, cape, and cowl. It also included a black-and-gold utility belt that carries Drake's weaponry, such as his bo staff and throwing discs. After Drake's confrontation with Ra's al Ghul in Red Robin #12, the costume was slightly altered with spiked gauntlets, a cropped tunic, and a new utility belt.

The theme of a red and black costume continued in 2011 with Tim Drake's New 52 Red Robin outfit. The costume was altered considerably, as it was a single-piece red and black costume, with assorted belts on his waist and legs. The full cowl was replaced with a black domino mask, similar to his previous two Robin costume designs. His chest harness was attached to a set of rocket-powered wings, designed by Virgil Hawkins a.k.a. Static, that allow the Red Robin the ability to fly. He continued to use his bo staff and other assorted equipment.

In the 2016 DC Rebirth relaunch, Tim Drake maintains the role of the Red Robin. This Red Robin costume serves as a homage to his first Robin costume. His costume is returned to a similar look as his original Robin costume consisting of a red torso, yellow utility belt, black pants, green short sleeves, gloves, and boots. He also has a new cape that is black on the outside and yellow on the inside, similar to the Robin cape. While his Red Robin suit is similar to his first Robin suit, it has two "R"s as his logo instead of one, to show that he is no longer Robin and now the Red Robin. The mask is similar to his New 52 domino mask. His bo staff remains his primary weapon.

With the revived Young Justice series, Tim has returned to the identity of Robin. His new costume shares similarities with his DC Rebirth suit; however, it has various adjustments and revisions. His suit still has the red torso, black pants, and armored sleeves; however, his pants now merge into split-toed boots with green highlights, losing the green leg guards. He has replaced the bulkier arm guards with smaller arm guards with blades similar to Damian Wayne's Robin suit. His cape, while still black and gold, is now scalloped to look similar to his later OYL cape. Tim's double-R logo has been replaced with his original single "R" logo. He continues to use a bo-staff as his primary weapon.

For a brief period in Young Justice, Tim adopted the Drake identity, wielding a bo staff and wearing a capeless brown suit with black on the arms and boots and gold accents, before returning to his original Robin costume in Young Justice (vol. 3) #19.

In the 2025 Batman series, Tim Drake takes on a significantly redesigned costume, sporting a more angular red-and-yellow design and missing the prominent green of other Robin costumes. The "R" logo is yellow, and more angular than previous designs. This costume is designed to match with the new Batman costume from the same series.

== Other versions ==
- An alternate timeline version of Tim Drake who became Batman following Bruce Wayne's death appears in Titans Tomorrow.
- An alternate timeline version of Tim Drake who became Batman following Terry McGinnis' death appears in The New 52: Futures End. He founded a bar named the Wounded Duck Bar and uses it as his base of operations.
- An alternate universe version of Tim Drake appears in DC Comics Bombshells. This version is a former prisoner of Katherine-Webb Kane's orphanage, where he was forced to build robots for the Axis powers.
- An alternate universe version of Tim Drake appears in Nightwing: The New Order.
- An alternate universe version of Tim Drake appears in DCeased. This version was infected by the Anti-Life Equation and subsequently killed by Batman.

== In other media ==
=== Television ===
- Tim Drake as Robin appears in media set in the DC Animated Universe (DCAU). Similarly to Jason Todd, this version displays a rebellious personality and was originally a street thief whose father Steven Drake was killed by Two-Face.
  - Tim first appears in The New Batman Adventures, voiced by Mathew Valencia.
  - Tim appears in the Superman: The Animated Series episode "Knight Time", voiced again by Mathew Valencia.
  - Tim makes guest appearances in Static Shock, voiced by Eli Marienthal in the episode "The Big Leagues" and Shane Sweet in "Future Shock".
  - Tim makes a non-speaking cameo appearance in the Justice League episode "Hereafter". Additionally, an alternate timeline version of Tim makes a cameo appearance in "The Savage Time".
- Tim Drake as Robin appears in Young Justice, voiced by Cameron Bowen. This version is a member of the Team whose costume is primarily based on that of his appearance in "One Year Later". In the third and fourth seasons, Outsiders and Phantoms, he joins Batman Inc. and the Outsiders respectively.
- Tim Drake as Robin appears in the Teen Titans Go! episode "The Best Robin", voiced by Scott Menville. This version is a member of Team Robin.
- Tim Drake as Robin appears in Titans, portrayed by Jay Lycurgo. This version is a delivery boy who idolizes Batman. After deducing Nightwing's identity and following Jason Todd / Robin's death, Drake approaches the former to become the new Robin and join the Titans, but is turned down. Nonetheless, he assists them in finding Jonathan Crane and a resurrected Todd, only to be killed by the former. In the afterlife, Tim meets and joins forces with Donna Troy and Hank Hall to escape. Eventually, Drake rejoins the Titans to help them save Gotham City from Crane and is invited by Nightwing to join the team in San Francisco. In the fourth season, Tim becomes the new Robin and enters a relationship with Bernard Fitzmartin, a S.T.A.R. Labs scientist and ally of the Titans.
- Tim Drake as Robin makes a non-speaking cameo appearance in the Harley Quinn episode "Batman Begins Forever".

=== Film ===
- The DCAU incarnation of Tim Drake / Robin appears in Batman Beyond: Return of the Joker, voiced by Dean Stockwell as an adult and again by Mathew Valencia as a teenager. In flashbacks, he was kidnapped, tortured, and brainwashed by the Joker and Harley Quinn, who turned him into a miniature version of the former nicknamed Joker Jr. and secretly embedded stolen Project Cadmus technology into him. Batman and Batgirl eventually rescued him, but Drake killed the Joker during the confrontation and was left traumatized. Over the course of two decades, Drake received treatment and therapy from Dr. Leslie Thompkins, was forced into retiring as Robin by Batman, got married, and found work as a communications engineer. He is later possessed by the Joker via the Cadmus technology, but is freed by Terry McGinnis / Batman II. While recovering in the hospital, Drake reconciles with the original Batman and approves of McGinnis as a worthy successor to Bruce Wayne.
- The DCAU incarnation of Tim Drake / Robin appears in Batman: Mystery of the Batwoman, voiced again by Eli Marienthal.
- Tim Drake as Red Robin appears in the Batman Unlimited film series, voiced by Yuri Lowenthal.
- A young, alternate universe version of Tim Drake appears in Batman: Gotham by Gaslight, voiced by Tara Strong.
- A Feudal Japan-inspired incarnation of Tim Drake / Red Robin appears in Batman Ninja, voiced by Kengo Kawanishi in Japanese and Will Friedle in English.
- Tim Drake appears in Batman: Death in the Family, voiced by Nick Carson. Based on the viewer's choices, Tim can save Jason Todd / Red Robin from Two-Face and convince him not to kill him. Following this, Todd reforms and adopts Tim as his sidekick, Bat Kid.
- Tim Drake as Red Robin appears in Batman Ninja vs. Yakuza League, voiced by Kengo Kawanishi in Japanese and Nathan Wilson in English.
- Tim Drake as Robin appears in Batman: Knightfall, voiced by Jack Griffo.

=== Video games ===
- Tim Drake as Robin appears in Batman: Dark Tomorrow, voiced by Jonathan Roumie.
- Tim Drake as Robin appears as a playable character in Batman: Rise of Sin Tzu, voiced by Scott Menville.
- Tim Drake as Robin appears in DC Universe Online, voiced by Wil Wheaton.
- Tim Drake as Robin appears as a playable character in Young Justice: Legacy, voiced again by Cameron Bowen.
- Tim Drake as Robin and Red Robin appears as a character summon in Scribblenauts Unmasked: A DC Comics Adventure.
- Tim Drake as Red Robin appears in the mobile version of Injustice: Gods Among Us.
- Tim Drake as Robin appears in Infinite Crisis, voiced again by Cameron Bowen.
- Tim Drake as Red Robin makes a cameo appearance in Cyborg's ending in Injustice 2 as a member of the Teen Titans who was killed years prior.
- Tim Drake as Robin appears as a playable character in Gotham Knights, voiced by Sloane Morgan Siegel.
- Tim Drake as Robin appears as an obtainable outfit in Fortnite: Battle Royale. Additionally, his Red Robin suit appears as an unlockable alternative style.

==== Lego ====
- Tim Drake as Robin appears as a playable character in Lego Batman: The Videogame, voiced by James Arnold Taylor.
- Tim Drake as Robin and Red Robin appears as a playable character in Lego Batman 2: DC Super Heroes, voiced by Charlie Schlatter.
- Tim Drake as Robin appears as a playable character in Lego Batman 3: Beyond Gotham, voiced again by Charlie Schlatter.
- Tim Drake as Robin appears as a non-playable character in Lego Dimensions, voiced again by Scott Menville.
- Tim Drake as Red Robin appears as a playable character in Lego DC Super-Villains, voiced again by Cameron Bowen.

==== Batman: Arkham ====
Tim Drake as Robin appears in the Batman: Arkham series. This version is darker and gritter than his comics counterpart, a decision made by the developers to have him fit in with the series' overall tone. Additionally, he dates, and later marries, Barbara Gordon.

- Robin first appears in Batman: Arkham City, voiced by Troy Baker. He initially makes a minor appearance in the story mode as an NPC before becoming a playable character in the Harley Quinn's Revenge DLC and several challenge maps. Furthermore, his Red Robin suit and Dick Grayson's Robin costume from Batman: The Animated Series appear as alternate skins.
- A mind-controlled Robin appears as a boss in Batman: Arkham City Lockdown.
- Robin appears in Batman: Arkham Knight, voiced by Matthew Mercer. He initially appears as a "Dual-Play" character in the story mode and the Batgirl: A Matter of Family DLC before becoming a playable character in the A Flip of the Coin DLC, as well as in challenge maps. Moreover, his classic, New 52, and One Year Later suits from the comics and Dick Grayson's Robin costume from the 1960s Batman television series all appear as alternate skins.
- Robin makes a minor appearance in Batman: Arkham VR, voiced by Tom Austen.

=== Miscellaneous ===
- The DCAU incarnation of Tim Drake appears in Batman Beyond (vol. 2). Despite being freed from the Joker's control by Batman II, Drake struggles to maintain his sanity. Bruce Wayne later offers him a job at Wayne Incorporated as a communications expert, with Tim accepting on the condition that Bruce not involve him in further vigilantism and pay for his children's college tuition.
- The Injustice incarnation of Tim Drake / Red Robin appears in the Injustice: Gods Among Us prequel comic as a new member of the Teen Titans. Following the Joker destroying Metropolis and Superman killing him in retaliation, the Titans join Superboy in fighting Superman. However, Superboy is mortally wounded, and the Titans are forced to exile themselves to the Phantom Zone to save him.
- The Injustice incarnation of Tim Drake / Red Robin appears in the Injustice 2 prequel comic, during which he is killed by General Zod amidst Batman's Insurgency's effort to rescue the Titans from the Phantom Zone.

== Collected editions ==
Tim Drake's earliest appearances as Robin were reprinted in trade paperback form shortly after their original publication. However, the ongoing series Robin was not regularly reprinted in trade paperbacks until the beginning of Bill Willingham's run as a writer with issue #121. The entire series was reprinted from that point onwards, as was its successor ongoing series Red Robin. All trade paperbacks from this period have since gone out of print.

Up until 2026, Robin (vol.4) #23-120 were never fully republished in trade paperback, though select issues have been republished in other collections that had multi-series crossover arcs (such as Robin (vol.4) #27-30 being collected in the Batman: Contagion trade paperback).

Beginning in 2015, DC began publishing new editions of trade paperbacks collecting Robin-centric stories starring Tim Drake. These collections began with the story arcs "Rite of Passage" and "Identity Crisis", and continued onward to include the three Robin miniseries and begin collecting the Robin ongoing series. Publication of these trade paperbacks stopped after five volumes.

DC began releasing Tim's first series (written by Chuck Dixon and Alan Grant) as paperback compendium collections under the name Robin: Tim Drake, starting in 2024. These releases contain previously collected material, crossover issues not previously included in the original trade paperback releases, and for the first time, republishing Robin (vol.4) issues never before reprinted in trade paperback. The entire Red Robin series has also been included in the compendium collection, containing previously collected material and crossover issues not included in the original trade paperback releases.

Title	Material collected	Release date	ISBN
Original trade paperback collections
Robin: A Hero Reborn	Batman #455-457, Robin #1-5	June 1991	978-1-56389-029-1
Robin: Tragedy and Triumph	Detective Comics #618-621, Robin II: The Joker's Wild! #1-4	November 1993	978-1-56389-078-9
Robin: Flying Solo	Robin (vol. 4) #1-4, material from Showcase '94 #5-6	July 2000	978-1-56389-609-5
Robin: Unmasked!	Robin (vol. 4) #121–125	September 2004	978-1-4012-0235-4
Robin/Batgirl: Fresh Blood	Robin (vol. 4) #132–133; Batgirl (vol. 2) #58–59	September 2005	978-1-4012-0433-4
Robin: To Kill a Bird	Robin (vol. 4) #134–139	April 2006	978-1-4012-0909-4
Robin: Days of Fire and Madness	Robin (vol. 4) #140–145	August 2006	978-1-4012-0911-7
Robin: Wanted	Robin (vol. 4) #148–153	March 2007	978-1-4012-1225-4
Robin: Teenage Wasteland	Robin (vol. 4) #154–162	November 2007	978-1-4012-1480-7
Robin: The Big Leagues	Robin (vol. 4) #163–167	March 2008	978-1-4012-1673-3
Robin: Violent Tendencies	Robin (vol. 4) #170–174; Robin/Spoiler Special #1	December 2008	978-1-4012-1988-8
Robin: Search for a Hero	Robin (vol. 4) #175–183	August 2009	978-1-4012-2310-6
Red Robin: The Grail	Red Robin #1–5	April 2010	978-1-4012-2619-0
Red Robin: Collision	Red Robin #6–12, Batgirl (vol. 3) #8	September 2010	978-1-4012-2883-5
Red Robin: The Hit List	Red Robin #13–17	June 2011	978-1-4012-3165-1
Red Robin: 7 Days of Death	Red Robin #18–21, 23–26, Teen Titans (vol. 3) #92	March 2012	978-1-4012-3364-8
Tim Drake: Robin Vol. 1	Tim Drake: Robin #1-6, "Elephant in the Room" (from DC Pride: Tim Drake Special #1)	September 26, 2023	978-1-77952-057-9
Tim Drake: Robin Vol. 2	Tim Drake: Robin #7-10, Urban Legends #4-6, and #10	April 16, 2024	978-1-77952-491-1
New edition trade paperback collections
Robin Vol. 1: Reborn	Batman #455–457, Detective Comics #618–621 and Robin #1–5	November 2015	978-1-4012-5857-3
Robin Vol. 2: Triumphant	Batman #465, 467–469, Robin II: The Joker's Wild! #1–4 and Robin III: Cry of the Huntress #1–6	March 2016	978-1-4012-6089-7
Robin Vol. 3: Solo	Robin (vol. 4) #1–5, Robin Annual #1–2 and material from Showcase '93 #5–6, 11–12	December 2016	978-1-4012-6362-1
Robin Vol. 4: Turning Point	Robin (vol. 4) #6–13, #0 and material from Showcase '94 #5–6	July 2017	978-1-4012-6587-8
Robin Vol. 5: War of the Dragons	Robin (vol. 4) #14–22, Robin Annual #3 and Detective Comics #685–686	January 2018	978-1-4012-7512-9
Compendium collections
Robin: Tim Drake Compendium Book One	Batman #455-457, #465-469, #480, Detective Comics #618-621, Robin (vol. 1) #1-5, Robin II: The Joker's Wild! #1-4, Robin III: Cry of the Huntress #1-6, Robin (vol. 2) #1-5, Robin Annual #1-2, Superman (vol. 2) #70, Superman: The Man of Steel #14, and stories from Batman 80-Page Giant #2 and Showcase '93 #1-6, #11-12	July 23, 2024	978-1-77952-593-2
Robin: Tim Drake Compendium Book Two	Robin (vol. 2) #6-30, Robin Annual #3–4, Azrael: Agent of the Bat #15-16, Batman: Shadow of the Bat #48-49, Detective Comics #685-686, #695-696, Catwoman #25, #31-32, Green Arrow #105, Showcase '94 #5-6, The Batman Chronicles #2, #4	December 22, 2026	978-1-79950-984-4
Red Robin: Tim Drake Compendium	Robin (vol. 2) #175-183, Red Robin #1-26, Batman: The Return of Bruce Wayne #1-6, Blackest Night: Batman #1-3, Bruce Wayne: The Road Home: Red Robin #1, Superman/Batman #62, Batgirl #8, Teen Titans #92, Batman #709, and Gotham City Sirens #22	August 25, 2026	978-1-79950-884-7

== Other collected editions ==
- Batman: A Lonely Place of Dying
- Batman: Knightfall Vol. 2: Knightquest (new edition) (Robin (vol. 4) #7)
- Batman: Knightfall Vol. 3: KnightsEnd (new edition) (Robin (vol. 4) #8–9 and 11–13)
- Batman: Zero Hour (Robin (vol. 4) #10)
- Batman: Prodigal (Robin (vol. 4) #11–13)
- Robin: 80 Years of the Boy Wonder (Robin (vol. 4) #25-26)
- Batman: Contagion (Robin (vol. 4) #27–30)
- Batman: Legacy (Robin (vol. 4) #31–33)
- Robin, the Boy Wonder: A Celebration of 75 Years (Robin (vol. 4) #46)
- Batman: Cataclysm (Robin (vol. 4) #52-53)
- Batman: No Man's Land Vol. 1 (modern edition) (Robin (vol. 4) #54)
- Batman: No Man's Land Vol. 2 (modern edition) (Robin (vol. 4) #67)
- Batman: No Man's Land Vol. 3 (modern edition) (Robin (vol. 4) #68–72)
- Batman: No Man's Land Vol. 4 (modern edition) (Robin (vol. 4) #73)
- Batman Arkham Asylum Special (Robin (vol. 4) #85)
- Batman: New Gotham Vol. 2: Officer Down (Robin (vol. 4) #86)
- Bruce Wayne: Murderer? (Robin (vol. 4) #98–99)
- Batman: War Games Vol. 1 (modern edition) (Robin (vol. 4) #121, 126–129)
- Batman: War Games Vol. 2 (modern edition) (Robin (vol. 4) #130–131)
- Teen Titans Vol. 5: Life and Death (Robin (vol. 4) #146–147)
- Batman: The Resurrection of Ra's al Ghul (Robin (vol. 4) #168–169 and Annual #7)
- Batman: Gotham Shall Be Judged (Red Robin #22)
- Tim Drake: Pride Special #1 (Urban Legends #4-6, 10 and "Elephant in the Room")

== See also ==
- Alternative versions of Robin
- List of Batman supporting characters
- List of DC Comics characters
