= Andrea Beaumont =

Phantasm
- Andrea Beaumont as the Phantasm, on a splash page in Batman/Catwoman #2 (January 2021), art by Clay Mann.

Publication information
- Publisher: DC Comics
- First appearance: Batman: Mask of the Phantasm
- First comic appearance: Batman: Mask of the Phantasm – The Animated Movie #1 (January 1994)
- Created by: Alan Burnett; Paul Dini; Bruce Timm

In-story information
- Full name: Andrea "Andi" Beaumont
- Species: Human
- Abilities: Skilled martial artist; High-tech costume: bodysuit with Kevlar covering, mask with voice modifier, bladed gauntlet, artificial fog manipulation system; Expert illusionist

Andrea Beaumont, also known as the Phantasm, is a supervillain and antiheroine created by Alan Burnett and Paul Dini, and designed by Bruce Timm. Beaumont first appeared as the main antagonist in the 1993 DC Animated Universe (DCAU) film Batman: Mask of the Phantasm, where she was established as the fiancée of Bruce Wayne/Batman. Dana Delany provided the voice work for Andrea and Stacy Keach provided the electronically modified voice of her "Phantasm" alter ego; Keach also provided the voice of Andrea's father, Carl.

Andrea Beaumont / Phantasm has made occasional appearances in various DCAU media. In December 2020, Beaumont made her main DC Universe comic book debut in Tom King's Batman/Catwoman 12-issue maxiseries.

== Mask of the Phantasm ==
=== Character design ===
Phantasm character art from the film's style guide.

In keeping with Batman: The Animated Series' film noir inspiration and "Dark Deco" visual style, Bruce Timm created Andrea's civilian design to reference women's fashion from the 1940s, including: red hair in a long bob (reminiscent of Lauren Bacall), "sweater girl" sweaters, high-waisted pencil skirts, wrap dresses, and pumps.

Timm designed the Phantasm's costume to reflect Alan Burnett's initial description of a Grim Reaper-esque character. Burnett wanted the villain to be reminiscent of the Ghost of Christmas Future, a similarity that the Joker mentions in the film. Timm went through approximately 20 different character designs for the Phantasm before creating a version that would evolve into the final design. Five alternate designs for the Phantasm's costume were featured in HBO's "First Look" television preview for Mask of the Phantasm.

Described by Timm as resembling a "tall, gaunt Death character", the Phantasm's costume is hooded and features a metal, skull-like mask. The Phantasm carries a large blade, reminiscent of a scythe, in her right hand. The blade was not part of Timm's original design, and was added later at Burnett's insistence. The character's left glove houses a chemically-based, artificial fog-generating device that the Phantasm uses for stealth, combat, and intimidation. At various points in Mask of the Phantasm, the Phantasm's manipulation of fog makes it appear that the character has supernatural powers, such as intangibility and the ability to vanish. These smoke-filled appearances were influenced by the Marvel Comics supervillain Mysterio.

The Phantasm's facade is completed by a masculine voice provided by Stacy Keach, which was digitally altered in post-production to be deeper and echo. Portions of Keach's unmodified performance can be heard in Mask of the Phantasm's theatrical trailer, including the Phantasm's signature phrase: "Your angel of death awaits". The Phantasm's on-screen presence is accompanied by an eerie theme composed by Shirley Walker that prominently features the theremin.

=== Role ===
The screenwriters of Batman: Mask of the Phantasm included Alan Burnett, Martin Pasko, Paul Dini, and Michael Reaves. Pasko wrote many of the flashback sequences (including those featuring Andrea and Reaves) and the final showdown between Batman, the Phantasm, and the Joker. Andrea is based loosely on a combination of Judson Caspian (the Reaper) and his daughter Rachel, characters from the four-issue 1987 "Batman: Year Two" comic book storyline that ran in Detective Comics #575-578. According to Kevin Conroy, Andrea was named after voice director Andrea Romano.

Andrea Beaumont unmasked.

In Mask of the Phantasm, producer Alan Burnett "wanted to do a big love story with Bruce because we hadn't really done it on the TV show. I wanted a story that got into his head". Burnett centered Andrea in his conception of the film's story: "We wanted to make a big movie story. We were telling a story about 'the girl who got away'. The one woman who could have stopped Bruce from ever becoming Batman". The resulting narrative, which dealt with Bruce's decision to become and remain Batman, hinged on Bruce and Andrea's relationship.

Andrea's role in Mask of the Phantasm corresponds with that of the femme fatale from hardboiled detective fiction and Hawksian woman from film noir. Burnett felt that the film's narrative should be removed from Batman's traditional rogues gallery. The fact that Andrea is revealed as the main villain in a plot twist is a convention of the femme fatale stock character.

Andrea serves as a foil for Batman. The characters are very similar; they both don an intimidating costume and speak to the gravestones of their parents (as if holding a conversation with the deceased). The paralleling of their characters — most importantly the death of their parents at the hand of criminals — highlights how different they are: Though they both became vigilantes, Andrea chose to become a killer, following a warped code of "eye for an eye" justice, while Bruce chose a code of ethics that forbids killing.

=== Plot ===
Andrea Beaumont, as she appeared in the animated film Batman: Mask of the Phantasm (1993).

Andrea Beaumont is the daughter of financier Carl Beaumont and his late wife Victoria. She meets fellow Gotham University student and billionaire Bruce Wayne, and they fall in love. Bruce vacillates between the promise he made to his murdered parents to fight crime versus starting a married life with Andrea, which he feels his parents would have wanted for him. Bruce dons a mask and leather jacket to stop a truck hijacking, but the robbers mock him instead of being intimidated. Bruce decides to marry Andrea and abandon crime-fighting, instead pledging part of his inheritance to the Gotham City Police Department. The two explore a grotto on his property, later to become the Batcave, and Andrea accepts Bruce's proposal.

Andrea learns that her father is a criminal, having set up dummy corporations for Mafia boss Sal Valestra and his associates Chuckie Sol and Buzz Bronski. When the mobsters find evidence of skimming, Carl and Andrea flee to Europe. Andrea breaks off her engagement with Bruce, who buries his sorrows by becoming Batman. Andrea and her father bounce around Europe before settling on the Mediterranean coast.

Carl's former lawyer, Arthur Reeves — the sole keeper of the family’s flight secrets — sells the Beaumonts' whereabouts to the mob in return for money to finance his Gotham City Council run. Although Carl returns the stolen funds, the mobsters order his death. Their button man, Jack Napier (later to become the Joker) is sent to deal with him. Leaving, he passes by Andrea. She tells him her father paid them back, but Napier ignores her. Andrea screams when she sees her father's corpse.

Abandoning any hope of reconciliation with Bruce, Andrea spends years training herself to exact revenge on her father's murderers. She returns to Gotham as the Phantasm, with a smoke generator, scythe-bladed gauntlet, and a voice changer embedded in her mask, which makes her voice sound like her father's. She kills Sol and Bronski. Batman had thwarted Sol's plan to flood Gotham with fake money and is blamed for the killings of Bronski and Sol. Reeves demands peace and, over Commissioner Gordon's objections, orders the GCPD to hunt Batman. Andrea visits her mother's grave. Batman, also drawn to his parents' grave, sees her and flees, but Andrea guesses his secret identity. She rebuffs his questions about the mobsters and Carl Beaumont. Valestra's appeal to Reeves for protection from Batman fails, so he seeks out the Joker to kill Batman.

The Phantasm breaks into Valestra's home to murder him, only to find Joker has already done so and set a trap for Batman. Andrea changes out of her costume and helps Batman escape. She lies to Bruce that the Phantasm is her father and that she is trying to stop his killing spree. They spend the night together. Meanwhile, Reeves is visited by Joker, who needles Reeves over his past dealings with Valestra, and reveals the new vigilante, not Batman, is responsible for the killings. He also suggests that Reeves either carried them out himself or hired someone to protect his career... just as Andrea calls Reeves' office to cancel their date. Joker gleefully remarks how Carl's daughter called just as they were discussing him, poisoning Reeves near-lethally with Joker venom. Batman sneaks into Reeves' room and forces him to confess to betraying Carl, before leaving Reeves to his hysteria.

The Phantasm tracks the Joker to his hideout at the derelict Gotham World Fairgrounds, but he has guessed her identity and anticipated the attack. They battle, and the Joker lures her to a giant turbine. Batman intervenes before the blades can crush the Phantasm. She attempts to justify her actions by relating them to Bruce's vow, and Batman begs her to leave. She disappears in a cloud of smoke. Batman and the Joker fight to the brink of exhaustion when the fairground - rigged with explosives - detonates and begins to crumble. The Phantasm reappears, saying, "One way or another, it ends tonight". With the Joker in her power, the Phantasm disappears with her captive.

Escaping the fairground through the sewers, Batman grieves that he couldn't save Andrea. Alfred assures Bruce that while he's kept above vengeance's influence, Andrea chose her path, and Bruce alone couldn't have changed it. Suddenly noticing a glimmer, Bruce races toward it to find Andrea's locket left for him, revealing she survived. She stands alone at night on the deck of an ocean liner. A male partier attempts to make conversation, but notices her solemnity and asks if she wants to be alone, to which she replies, "I am."

== DCAU animation and comics ==
Her first real appearance was in the movie adaptation mini comic that came with the VHS release (this comic was a digest size) and was released in December 1993. Simultaneously, there was a Prestige Format which was the traditional sized comic. Both of these books had the same red cover. There was a newsstand edition which featured a different cover.

=== Adventures ===
The Phantasm makes her first returning appearance in "Shadow of the Phantasm", a story in the comic Batman & Robin Adventures Annual #1 (November 1996). In a direct sequel to Mask of the Phantasm, Andrea and Batman defeat Arthur Reeves, who - having been driven mad with a permanent grin on his face by the Joker as the doctors were unable to fully treat him - is determined to exact revenge on Beaumont and Batman, who he finally learns is Bruce Wayne, with Reeves falling to his death.

In 2004's Batman Adventures: Shadows and Masks, Andrea goes undercover in Black Mask's organization, the False Face Society. During this story arc, she meets Bruce (who was also infiltrating the organisation as his criminal disguise "Matches Malone") at Wayne Manor and asks him not to interfere with her operation. He coldly rebukes her, calling her a "killer". She eventually fights Batgirl and has her captured and put in a water tank to kill her only for her to be freed by Bruce who was present there and then later tries to kill Black Mask.

=== Superman: The Animated Series ===
Delany later voiced Lois Lane and teamed up with Kevin Conroy again for the three-part Superman: The Animated Series crossover, "World's Finest." In these episodes, Lois found herself in a love triangle with Superman and Batman. According to Delany, Batman was drawn to Lois "because she had Andrea’s voice." This subtle detail proved that Bruce still held a deep love for Andrea long after the events of Batman: Mask of the Phantasm, simply because Lois reminded him of her.

=== "Epilogue" ===
The Phantasm makes a cameo appearance in the Justice League Unlimited episode "Epilogue" (2005). Years after Bruce Wayne's retirement, Amanda Waller hires the now-elderly Andrea to murder Terry McGinnis' parents and recreate the original Batman's origin. However, when Andrea realizes what she's been hired to do, she refuses Waller's contract.

=== Batman Beyond 2.0 ===
The Phantasm returns in "Mark of the Phantasm", a seven-part storyline in the 2015 digital comic Batman Beyond 2.0 (set after the Batman Beyond animated series). At the secret behest of Amanda Waller, Andrea seeks out the great grandnephew of Joe Chill, Jake Chill (a.k.a. the Vigilante), for the murder of Terry McGinnis' father. Beaumont is charged with killing Jake before Terry learns of Jake's guilt, in an effort to remove any temptation for Terry to attempt the same.

After an initial attempt on Jake's life fails due to Terry's intercession, Andrea visits Bruce in the Batcave. Bruce reveals that he searched for Andrea years earlier and attempts to convince her that it is not too late for them. Andrea acknowledges that, despite their similarities, they are at loggerheads: "I do things Batman can't. I always have". Beaumont abandons her second attempt on Jake's life when he accidentally dies from exposure to Joker venom.

== DC Universe ==
Andrea Beaumont, in her mainstream canon debut, in Batman/Catwoman #1 (December 2020, DC Comics), art by Clay Mann.

Andrea Beaumont/Phantasm made her comic debut in Batman/Catwoman limited series by writer Tom King and artist Clay Mann in December 2020. Previously revealed in 2019, posted on Twitter by King and Mann, the image of the Phantasm included Batman and Catwoman reflected in the Phantasm's scythe, in addition to the text "She awaits you" (a reference to the Phantasm's catchphrase) and the series title.

DC Comics describes Beaumont's role in one of three timelines featured in the comic: "And in the present, Bruce and Selina's union is threatened by the arrival of one of Batman's past flings, Andrea Beaumont, a.k.a. Phantasm. Beaumont's return calls into question how each character chooses to operate in their costumed, and personal, lives, and any move by Phantasm could change the fate of Bruce and Selina's future".

== In other media ==
- The Phantasm appears as a playable character in Lego DC Super-Villains via downloadable content.
- Andrea Beaumont appears in Batman: Arkham Shadow, voiced by Amber Hood.

== Action figures ==

In conjunction with the release of Mask of the Phantasm in 1993, Kenner released a Phantasm action figure. The toy was packaged with Phantasm's mask and cloak off, revealing the villain's secret identity, and — apocryphally — spoiling the plot twist for audiences. This model was later re-released as part of a "Rogues Gallery" box set, but with the costume's grey and black coloring transposed.

In 2016, DC Collectibles released a new action figure in their 6-inch highly-articulated toy line based on Batman: The Animated Series, packed with a re-release of the Batman figure from the series. This figure is more precisely sculpted and has more articulation, though does not include an unmasked Beaumont portrait or feature seen in the 4-inch figure.
