= Geary Gravel =

American novelist

Geary Gravel is an American science fiction author and professional sign language interpreter. He lives in western Massachusetts and has written thirteen books.

== Bibliography ==
=== Autumnworld Mosaic ===
- The Alchemists (1984; nominated for Philip K. Dick Award for best novel)
- The Pathfinders (1986) (sequel to Alchemists)

=== War of the Fading Worlds ===
- A Key for the Nonesuch (1990)
- Return of the Breakneck Boys (1991) (sequel to Nonesuch)

=== Hook ===
- Hook: A Novel for Young Readers (1992) (novelization based on the Steven Spielberg Motion Picture)

=== Batman ===
- Mask of the Phantasm (1993) (novelization based on Batman: Mask of the Phantasm)
- Shadows of the Past (1993) (novelization based on Batman: The Animated Series)
- Dual to the Death (1994) (Batman: The Animated Series)
- The Dragon and the Bat (1994) (Batman: The Animated Series)
- Batman and Mr. Freeze (1997) (A Golden Book)

=== Might and Magic ===
- The Dreamwright (1995) (a Might and Magic novel)
- The Shadowsmith (1996) (sequel to Dreamwright)

=== Edgar Rice Burroughs Universe ===
- John Carter of Mars: Gods of the Forgotten (2021) (authorized sequel to the Mars series of Edgar Rice Burroughs)

=== Short Fiction ===
- "Old Toad" in Tales of the Witch World 2 (1988)
- "Jason Gridley of Earth: Across the Moons of Mars" in Red Axe of Pellucidar (2022)
- "John Carter of Mars: Swords of the Mind" in A Princess of Mars: Shadow of the Assassins (2024)
