= Batman: Year Two =

1987 Detective Comics story arc

"Year Two"
- Cover of the 2002 re-issue of the collected edition, Batman: Year Two - Fear the Reaper.
- Publisher: DC Comics
- Publication date: June – September 1987
- Genre: Superhero
- Title(s): Detective Comics #575–578
- Main character(s): Batman; Reaper; Leslie Thompkins; Joe Chill

Creative team
- Writer: Mike W. Barr
- Penciller(s): Alan Davis; Todd McFarlane
- Inker(s): Paul Neary; Alfredo Alcala; Todd McFarlane
- Letterer(s): Richard Starkings; Agustin Mas; John Costanza; Todd Klein
- Colorist: Adrienne Roy
- Editor: Dennis O'Neil

Batman: Year Two is an American four-part, 1987 comics story arc featuring Batman, written by Mike W. Barr and illustrated by Alan Davis, Paul Neary, Alfredo Alcala, Mark Farmer, and Todd McFarlane. It originally appeared in the American comic book Detective Comics #575–578, published by DC Comics.

The story was initially a treatment by Barr titled "Batman: 1980", but it was released as Batman: Year Two to coincide with the release of Frank Miller's Batman: Year One. A similar Batman: Year Three would later be released.

This story was collected as a trade paperback in 1990. In 2002, DC Comics published a second printing of the trade paperback, this time with the addition of the 1991 one-shot sequel Batman: Full Circle included, with the new edition retitled as Batman: Year Two – Fear The Reaper (ISBN 1-56389-967-1). Elements of the story were incorporated into the 1993 film Batman: Mask of the Phantasm, including the concept of a masked vigilante waging war on criminals and having a personal connection to Bruce Wayne. The book was rereleased, along with Batman: Year One, in one volume in 2024.

== Plot ==
Batman is an established vigilante in Gotham City. Captain Gordon is Police Commissioner, and through an appearance on a talk show, explains that Batman is working with the Gotham Police Department. During the interview, the host reflects on the anniversary of the final sighting of Gotham's first vigilante, the Reaper.

Leslie Thompkins, who helped raise Bruce Wayne after his parents were murdered, introduces him to Rachel Caspian, a charity worker and aspiring nun. The two develop a romantic relationship. Rachel's father, Judson Caspian, is the original Reaper, driven to fight criminals after the death of his wife at the hands of one. After observing that crime is still rampant in Gotham, the retired vigilante returns to his Reaper costume and foils several crimes through the use of lethal force.

The Reaper's activities soon draw the attention of Batman, and the two fight. The Reaper's experience and weaponry (including his use of guns) prove too much for Batman, who is left bloodied, broken, and forced to flee before he is killed. Returning to Wayne Manor, Wayne admits that his skills in unarmed combat are not enough, and that perhaps the only way to confront a killer like the Reaper is by using a firearm -- something he has never done. Wayne retrieves the gun that killed his parents, which he has secretly kept as a reminder of his promise to fight crime. He prepares for the coming re-match.

Batman's vendetta against the Reaper leads to a falling out with Gordon, whom Batman nearly wounds to prevent him from arresting someone he considers his personal prey. Gordon misinterprets this action as Batman following in the Reaper's murderous footsteps and soon deploys his forces against both Batman and the Reaper.

As the Reaper lays waste to Gotham's underworld, several crime lords discuss the situation. Batman interrupts the meeting and proposes they join forces against the Reaper. The crime lords agree, but only if Batman cooperates with their handpicked agent. That individual is Joe Chill, the man who shot Thomas and Martha Wayne. Batman schemes to take Chill's life once the Reaper is disposed of, while he also lays the groundwork for his life after Batman by asking Rachel to marry him. She accepts. Secretly, the bosses instruct Chill to murder Batman once the Reaper is dealt with.

During a battle with the Reaper, the bosses are killed, and Batman's true plan is revealed to Commissioner Gordon. The Reaper is presumed dead, and Batman takes an unconscious Chill to one of his safe houses, and then to the site of the murder of the Waynes. There he reveals his identity and threatens him with the gun. Chill questions whether Batman has the nerve to pull the trigger, but before he has a chance, the Reaper re-emerges and shoots Chill himself. Now aware of Batman's identity, the Reaper beckons him to a final confrontation in the frameworks of the unfinished building housing the Wayne Foundation. Batman and the Reaper fight to a standstill, and Batman, gaining the upper hand, discovers the Reaper is Judson before he falls to his death.

Realizing that the way of the gun is not for him, Batman places Chill's gun in the cornerstone of the building, to be sealed away for good when construction is completed.

Bruce returns to Rachel, who is distraught over the news that her father was the Reaper. She produces her nun's habit from the closet and calls off the engagement, choosing to atone for her father's sins by devoting herself to the church. Bruce returns to prowling Gotham's streets in his role as Batman.

== Batman: Full Circle ==
A 1991 one-shot sequel, Batman: Full Circle, was also written by Barr and illustrated by Alan Davis. Years later, the story centers on Joe Chill's son assuming the Reaper's mantle. The story reunites most of the cast of Year Two and incorporates Robin (the Dick Grayson version) into the story.

Emulating the Reaper's mission of zero tolerance towards criminals and using his original costume and weapons, Chill Jr., in collaboration with his sister Marcia, attempts to lure Batman into a confrontation where they would finally dispose of the Dark Knight with a different weapon. The arrival of Chill's son, Joey, hampers Chill's schemes. Chill Jr. witnessed his father's death at the original Reaper's hands, but he could not make out Bruce Wayne's unmasked face. Overcome with grief, Chill seeks revenge on Batman. Batman faces personal issues with Rachel Caspian, who has returned to Gotham convinced the Reaper is her father reborn. Chill and his sister use this to their advantage, plaguing Rachel with encounters as a way to cast doubt in her and Batman's minds that he is the returned Judson Caspian (Joe Chill Sr.'s body was stolen before it could be taken into custody at the end of Year Two). The Reaper also uses an explosive to destroy the cornerstone of the Wayne Foundation building, freeing his father's gun.

Chill captures Batman and unmasks but does not recognize the unconscious crimefighter, Batman having applied elaborate makeup and hair dye to alter his appearance. Chill subjects Batman to a video reel and a hallucinogenic drug that reduces Batman to a quivering wreck suffering from survivor's guilt. Chill has Batman poised at the top of a pedestal overlooking a pool of acid, forcing him to watch a video where a young boy's parents are killed in front of him and then the boy subsequently thanks God he did not die himself. Chill hopes that Batman will kill himself from the resulting guilt. When Marcia, who saw her father as a thug who abused her mother and cared nothing for the revenge plot, tries to double-cross Chill to deliver Batman to mob boss Morgan Jones. Chill slashes Marcia, apparently killing her. Robin arrives and coaxes Batman out of his hallucinogenic haze. Batman defeats the Reaper. As Batman holds the unmasked Chill over the acid pool, urged by Robin to drop him, Chill's son Joey reveals himself and his father's identity. Bruce spares Chill Jr.'s life, reflecting that what began with Joe Chill and Thomas Wayne should end with their 'grandsons', Joey and Dick. After the police arrive and Chill is taken away in an ambulance, Batman throws Chill's gun into the ocean.

== In other media ==
The DC Animated Universe film Batman: Mask of the Phantasm adopted elements of the storyline, and also combines it with elements of "Batman: Year One" showing Batman's personal connection with original character Phantasm inspired by the Reaper.
