= Dong Yang Animation =

South Korean animation studio

Dong Yang Animation Co., LTD
- Industry: Animation
- Founded: 1981; 45 years ago
- Headquarters: South Korea

Dong Yang Animation Co., LTD is a South Korean animation studio that was founded in 1981 and contributed animation production services to many famous American animated shows since the late 1980s throughout the 1990s and the 2000s. It supplied its 2D Animation and 3D Animation services to major film studios like Warner Bros., Disney, Hanna-Barbera, Filmation, DIC Entertainment, Saban Entertainment and Film Roman.

== Projects ==
Among their most famous works are: Captain N: The Game Master, The Real Ghostbusters, The Karate Kid, Captain Planet, Batman: The Animated Series, Mighty Max, The Sylvester & Tweety Mysteries, Gargoyles, Batman: Mask of the Phantasm, Superman: The Animated Series, 101 Dalmatians: The Series, The New Batman Adventures (Won the 1998 Emmy Award for Animated Program), Freakazoid! (Won the 1998 Emmy Award for Animated Program), Histeria!, Animaniacs, Johnny Bravo, Big Guy and Rusty, Spider-Man Unlimited, Batman Beyond (Won the 2001 Emmy Award for Animated Program), Totally Spies!, Justice League, The Zeta Project, Static Shock, The Proud Family, He-Man and the Masters of the Universe, Xiaolin Showdown, Mucha Lucha, The Zula Patrol and The Batman.
