= Keep case =

Type of optical disc packaging

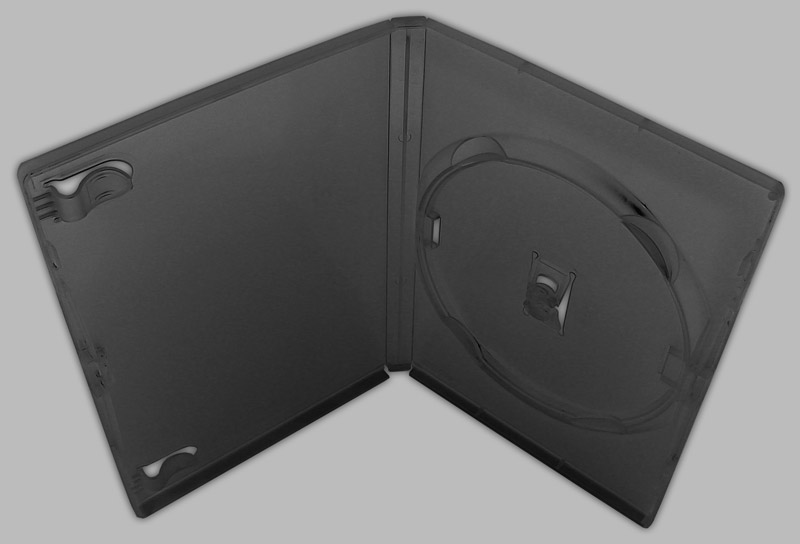
Standard black keep case

A keep case or poly-box is a type of packaging, most commonly used with DVDs and Blu-ray videos (and sometimes CDs).

Besides DVD-Video films, keep cases are very common with most disc-based video games since the PlayStation 2 although many modern systems use custom sizes, colours or molds and paint such as the Xbox Ones case, Blu-Ray discs also uses a one of a few custom Blu-Ray cases. Keep cases are also found on many PC titles (although many use CD Dual cases or thicker keep cases), and MP3-CD audiobooks (all use discs that are the same basic dimensions as a DVD).

== Products using keep cases ==
The first products to be released in keep cases were VHS tapes, though most were stored in less expensive pressboard sleeves. In the days before video games were released on optical media, cartridges would rarely come packaged in specially designed plastic keep cases with lugs inside to hold the instruction manual, as opposed to pressboard boxes. Cartridges and cards for the Master System platform were the first video games to be packaged in any kind of keep case. The vast majority of Sega Genesis/Mega Drive games would come in a plastic keep case (roughly the size of a VHS case), but they were later packaged in pressboard boxes as a cost-cutting measure. Before the standard and commonly used DVD case was invented, early CD-ROM-based video games such as Sega CD and early PlayStation titles would often come in a thicker and taller jewel case. These have been reputed to break very easily. Since the PlayStation 2, most major console-based video game software is packaged in some sort of keep case, including Nintendo DS cartridge titles and Sony PSP titles.

Full size
Product	Color	Size	Notes
Audio CD discs	Majority black, all other colors possible	142mm x 125mm x 9.9mm	Usually for audiobooks and student educational materials issued after mid 2000s.
Video CD discs	Majority black, all other colors possible		
DVD videos	Majority black, all other colors possible	190mm x 135mm x 15mm	Case thickness varies, although typically 15mm.
Blu-ray videos	Blue, pink, purple, black or clear	171.5mm x 135mm x 13mm	Rarely for individual discs. Used primarily for some Blu-ray/DVD combo packs.
PC CD-ROM games	Majority black or clear, all other colors possible		Usually for CD-ROM games issued after mid 2000s.
PC DVD-ROM games	Majority black or clear, all other colors possible		
Master System My Card games	Black		
PlayStation games	Navy blue		Only used for one game, Metal Gear Solid in the United States as part of a set.
PlayStation 2 games	Navy blue or black (Note: Blue in PAL regions from 2001 onward; some PAL releases have variant colors, such as silver for Platinum releases, red for games that require Buzz controllers, white for select SingStar games and Gran Turismo 4 (also white in Japan), and clear for Metal Gear Solid 2.)		Most contain a memory card slot
Dreamcast games	Black or orange		Select titles in Japan only.
GameCube games	Black (Note: Some games have variant colors in PAL regions such as blue (Super Mario Sunshine), red (Mario Kart: Double Dash), or silver (Player's Choice titles).)		North America/Europe. Most contain a memory card slot.
Xbox games	Lime green (Note: Platinum Hits (North America) come in silver, Xbox Classics (PAL regions) in green, Xbox Magazine demos in slim clear cases.)		
Xbox 360 games	Translucent lime green (Note: Platinum Hits games come in translucent grey, Kinect games in translucent purple, Xbox Magazine demos and Scene It? Lights, Camera, Action in slim clear.)		
Wii games	White (Note: Some games have variant colors such as red (New Super Mario Bros. Wii), yellow (Mario & Sonic at the London 2012 Olympic Games), and black (Pandora's Tower in Europe and Japan).)	190mm x 135mm x 14mm	
Wii U games	Bright cerulean (Note: Some games have variant colors such as red (the North American versions of Mario Kart 8 and Super Mario Maker), green (New Super Luigi U), and yellow (the PAL version of Super Mario Maker).)	190mm x 135mm x 14mm	

Smaller size
Product	Color	Notes
Audio CD discs	Translucent orange or clear	Used for some audiobooks and MP3 CD's issued after 2006.
Video CD discs	Majority clear, all other colors possible	
DVD videos	Black or clear	Rarely used for single discs, Black cases usually used for bonus features DVD in some Blu-ray and HD-DVD movie compilation packs. Clear cases used for some DVD music concert albums.
Blu-ray videos	Blue, often translucent. Other colors are used for some titles.	
High Fidelity Pure Audio Blu-ray songs & albums	Clear	
Blu-ray 3D	Translucent blue, some later titles have clear cases	Some cases have the Blu-ray 3D logo
Ultra HD Blu-ray videos	Black, Red, Blue, Yellow, Green, Purple & Orange	
HD DVD videos	Red, Orange, Yellow, Green, Blue, Purple & Pink, often translucent	
PlayStation 3 games	Translucent white (Note: Greatest Hits games in the Americas come in opaque red, and Platinum Hits games in Europe come in silver.)	
PlayStation 4 games	Translucent blue (Note: Greatest Hits games come in opaque red.)	
PlayStation 5 games	Translucent blue	
Xbox 360 games	Translucent green	Used for select reissued Xbox 360 titles after backwards compatibility was added to the Xbox One, Left handed case, Both Xbox 360 and Xbox One logos are embossed onto the top
Xbox One games	Translucent green	Left handed case, The Xbox One logo is embossed onto the top. Later issues lack the embossment, and have full size liner notes with "Xbox One" on the liner itself.
Xbox Series X games	Translucent green	Left handed case. An updated Xbox logo, in white, is embossed onto the top. There is also a black sticker of the "Series X" logo on the upper right corner of the case. Later issues lack the embossment, and have full size liner notes with "Xbox Series X" on the liner itself.

Larger size
Product	Color	Notes
VHS videos	Majority black and white, all other colors possible	
Betamax videos	Majority black and white, all other colors possible	
Many Famicom games	Black	
Nintendo Switch games	Black	Only used for the limited edition issue of Disney Classic Games: Aladdin and The Lion King
Master System cartridge games	Black	
Many Sega Genesis games	Black	
Neo Geo games	Black	
Early CD-I games	Gray	ABS case with a cardboard sleeve
Some 3DO games	Black	Snap case

Proprietary size
Product	Color	Size	Notes
GameCube games	Clear	149mm x 107mm x 17mm	Japan, also used for Game Boy Player startup disc in North America. Most contain a memory card slot.
Nintendo DS games	Black (Note: White for DSi-only games. Select Mario titles are red since 2010.)	135mm x 122mm x 15mm	North America/Japan, most contain a slot for Game Boy Advance cartridges or DS options pak.
Nintendo DS games	Clear	135mm x 122mm x 20mm	Europe, most contain a slot for Game Boy Advance cartridges or DS options pak.
(New) Nintendo 3DS games	White (Note: Select Mario games are red.)	135mm x 122mm x 12mm	Regular 3DS Games in all Regions; New 3DS exclusive Games only in Japan and North America
New Nintendo 3DS games	Black	135mm x 122mm x 14mm	Europe
Nintendo Switch games	Clear	170mm x 104mm x 10mm	Has tabs on right side above cartridge slot to keep any included printed materials in place
Nintendo Switch 2 Games	Red	170mm x 104mm x 10mm	
PlayStation Portable games	Clear	168mm x 99mm x 14mm	
PlayStation Vita games	Blue	135mm x 105mm x 12mm	

== Structure ==
=== Materials and features ===
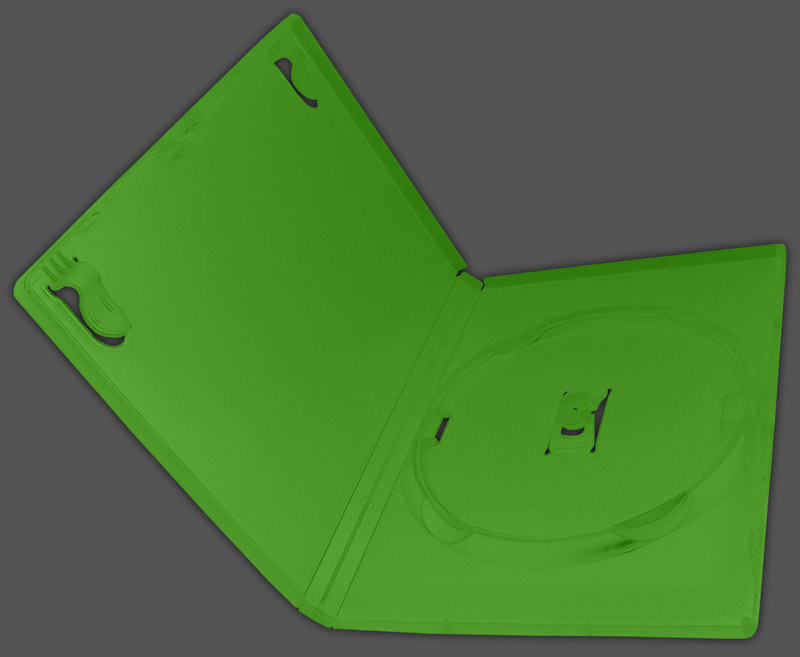
Lime green keep case used for most Xbox games

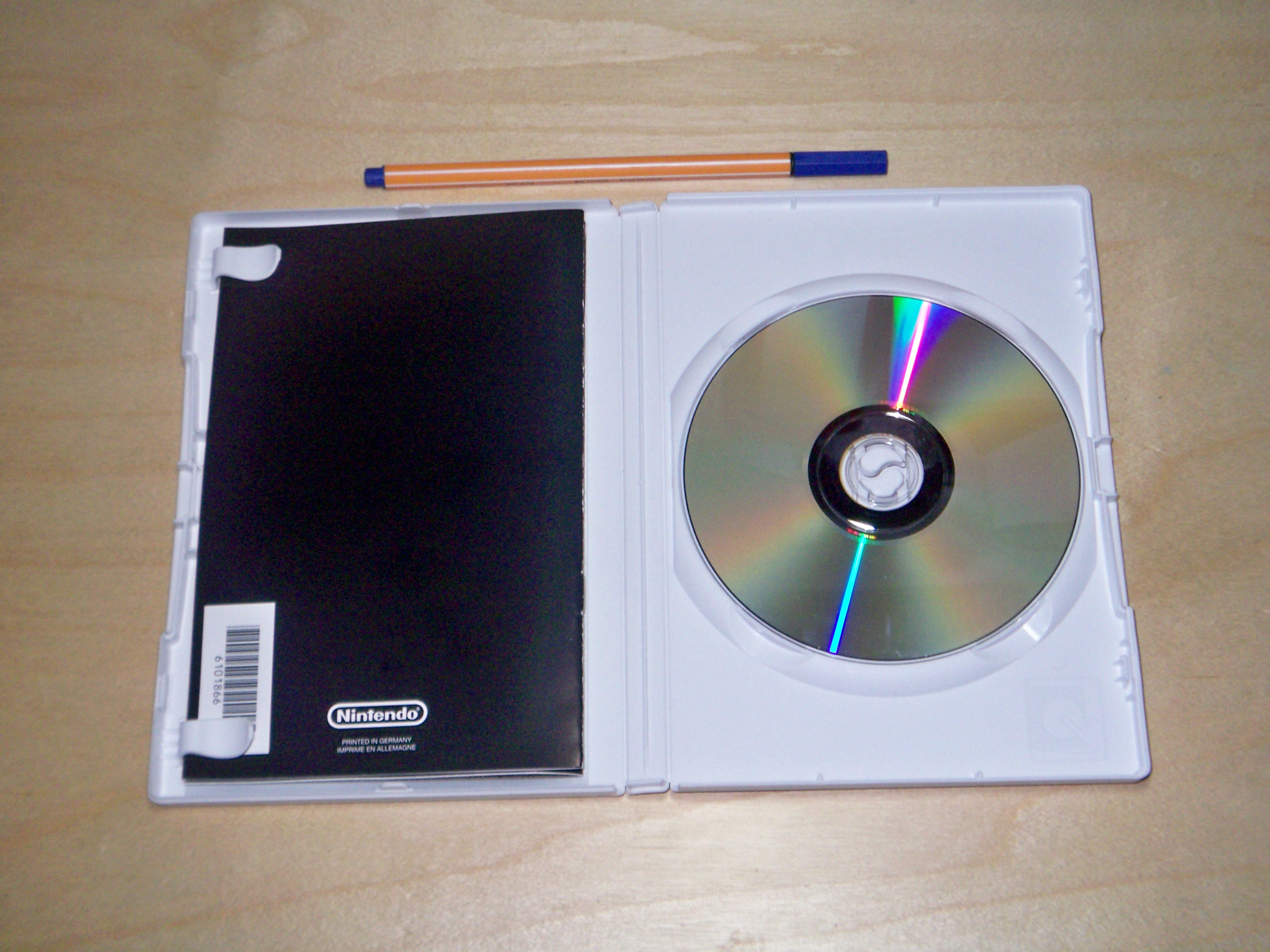
Wii keep case

The cases are made of soft, clear or colored, polypropylene plastic with a transparent polyethylene outer jacket, usually with a printed paper sleeve behind it. A variety of colors are produced, including black, white, red and clear. On the inside are sets of clips that may hold a booklet or additional sheets of paper with extra information. The DVD is held into place with a small protrusion (a "hub") which fits into the hole in the DVD. For console games like the PlayStation 2 and GameCube, an extra protrusion is available for storing memory cards.

=== Types of hubs ===
The structural differences between a CD and a DVD have led many manufacturers to study different hub designs for keeping the DVD (or the DVDs, in multi-disc cases) in place: unlike CDs, which are made from one layer of plastic material, DVDs have two layers, which are thinner (so that together they reach the same thickness of a CD) and not bonded all the way to the center. As a result, a DVD hub is weaker than a CD's, and may be damaged if stored in a case which is designed for CDs only.

In addition to "pluck hubs" (which are often a simple evolution over the classical "crown of teeth"), "push-to-release" hubs are very common: in this case the hub is made in such a way that simply pushing on it with a finger compresses its component parts, thus shrinking the space it occupies and releasing the disc center; under normal situations the release cannot occur accidentally and requires someone to push on the hub (this is obviously more difficult to obtain in slim and ultra-slim cases, where in fact pluck hubs may be preferred to push-type ones).

=== Damage risk ===
The larger size of the keep case compared to the CD jewel box means that if the disc becomes detached from the center hub, it can move around inside the box, and the playable surface can be scratched by the hub. This can be a problem during shipping.

The center "pluck hubs" are designed to keep a disc in place while shipping, but can be too tight for normal home use. Because of this, the disc can be damaged upon removal due to excess warping. However, the edges of the center hub can be permanently bent in slightly to allow for a looser fit. Discs are then able to slip out easily, ideal for the home shelf.

=== Physical dimensions ===
==== Case ====
The height and width of a (closed) keep case are fixed at 190 mm (7.5 in) and 135 mm (5.3 in), respectively. The thickness may vary to accommodate more discs ("multi" case) or to require less shelf space ("slim" or "thin" case). For a typical single-disc case, it is 15mm.

A keep case, thus, approximates the Video Software Dealers Association recommendation that a single-disc DVD-Video package have the same height as a VHS tape (187 mm) and the same width as a CD jewel case (142 mm). These dimensions are similar to digest size magazines.

==== Paper sleeve ====
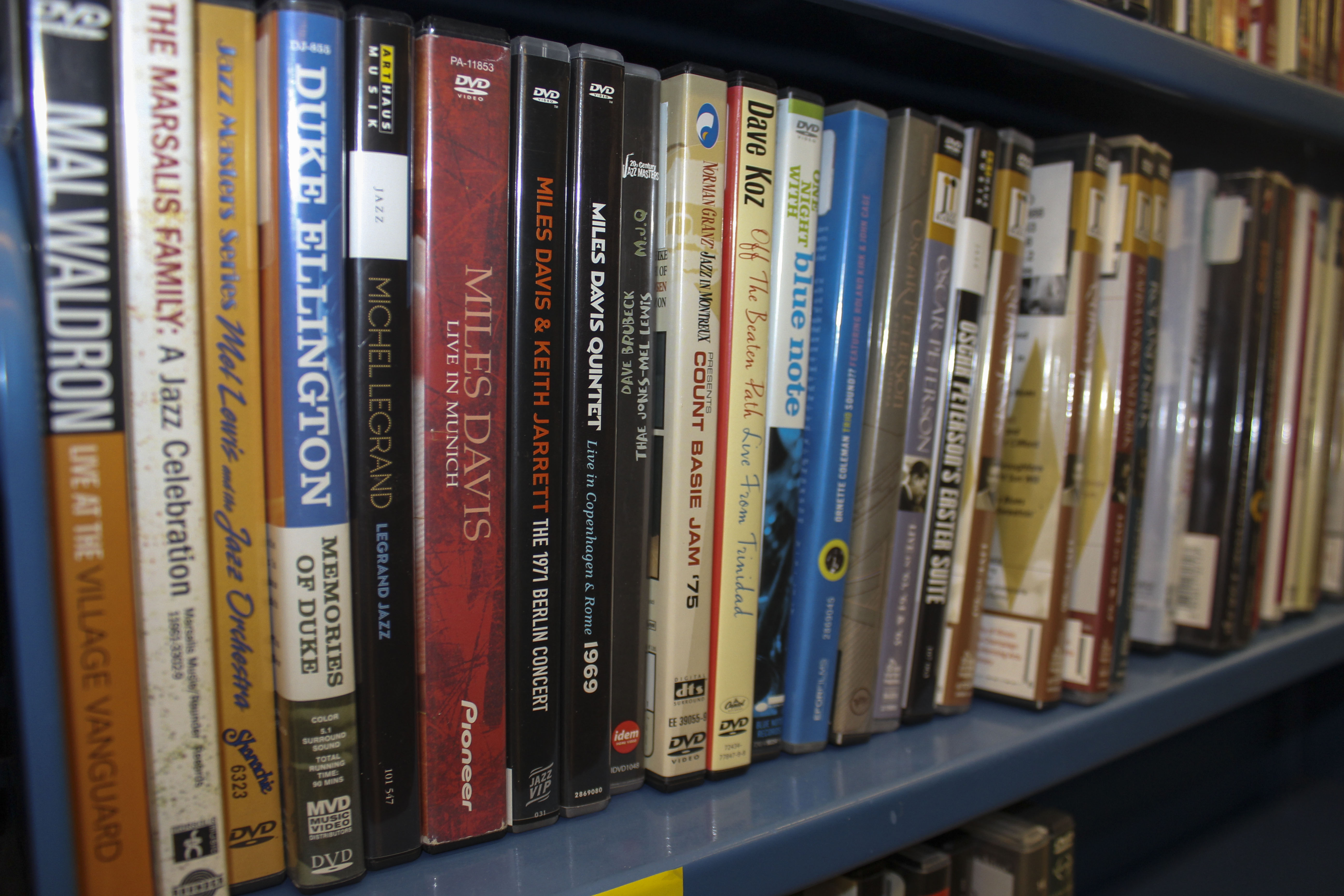
Keep cases with printed sleeves (a.k.a. DVD case inserts): text and colors are printed on the paper/card stock which is held in place between transparent thin plastic and opaque thicker plastic.

The printed paper sleeve for a standard DVD case can be printed on a standard A4 sheet of paper which, after cropping, can be slipped into the outer jacket. The paper room on the front and back panels of the case is 129.5mm × 183mm and spine panels have a width of 14mm or less. This gives 273mm × 183mm as resulting maximum overall dimensions for the printout (which is less than the 297mm × 210mm of an A4 paper sheet).

==== Inserts ====
Booklet inserts or leaflet material, when folded closed, should measure to a maximum of 120mm × 180mm. This usually includes a digital copy code for a digital locker service or a downloadable content code, if included.

Similar, though not identical, packaging is used for commercial Blu-ray Disc titles and was used for HD DVD titles. However, the dimensions of the cases are somewhat different, about 19 mm shorter. The individual cases are color-coded, with blue being used for Blu-ray and red for HD DVD, and the format displayed prominently on a stripe above the cover art.

=== Empty cases and do-it-yourself ===
In addition to the industrial usages reported above, empty keep cases are available at retail stores, which can serve for instance as a replacement for broken cases or for DVDs containing personal video recordings or data. Common brands are Maxell, Memorex, TDK, Verbatim, NexPak, US Digital Media and Amaray. Some vendors, e.g. TDK and Infiniti, also sell recordable DVDs individually packed in keep cases.

== See also ==
- Optical disc packaging
