= Reaper (DC Comics) =

Reaper is the name of several characters in the DC Comics universe, primarily appearing as enemies of Batman.

== Publication history ==
The pre-Crisis Reaper debuted in Batman #237 (December 1971) and was created by Dennis O'Neil. The character was inspired by science-fiction writer Harlan Ellison suggesting to O'Neill that he writes a story about Nazi war criminals.

Created by writer Mike W. Barr and designed by artist Alan Davis, the Judson Caspian version of the Reaper first appeared in Detective Comics #575 (June 1987), the first part of the four-part Batman: Year Two storyline. After the changes in DC continuity that Zero Hour established, Year Two, Joe Chill's death and the Reaper are erased. Chill was back in continuity after 2005's Infinite Crisis. An unidentified Reaper appears in The New 52, a 2011 reboot of the DC Comics universe.

== Fictional character biographies ==
=== Dr. Benjamin Gruener ===
Dr. Benjamin Gruener is a German Jew who was placed in a concentration camp run by Colonel Kurt Schloss. He kills Schloss at a Halloween parade and seemingly dies battling Batman when he falls off the edge of a dam.

In Tony S. Daniel's "Batman: Life After Death" story arc, Hugo Strange resurrects Gruener and manipulates him into becoming a mass murderer. However, Batman makes Gruener see that Strange is using him before leaving.

=== Judson Caspian ===
Reaper

Publication information
- Publisher: DC Comics
- First appearance: Detective Comics #575 (June 1987)
- Created by: Mike W. Barr (writer); Alan Davis (artist)

In-story information
- Alter ego: Judson Caspian
- Species: Human
- Abilities: Spiked leather armor Scythe-shaped weapons with hidden firearms

Judson Caspian is a socialite by day and a vigilante by night. After losing his wife to a robber in the streets, he becomes the Reaper, targeting public menaces and murdering them with a scythe. He has a run-in with Green Lantern Alan Scott before traveling to Europe and disappearing.

Several decades later, Caspian reassumes the Reaper identity and battles Batman. Batman works with the mob and Joe Chill to battle the Reaper, who eventually kills Chill. Caspian is later killed in a battle with Batman after choosing to fall off a ledge.

=== Joe Chill Jr. ===
Reaper
- Cover to Batman: Full Circle by Alan Davis.

Publication information
- Publisher: DC Comics
- First appearance: Batman: Full Circle

In-story information
- Alter ego: Joe Chilton III
- Species: Human
- Abilities: Spiked leather armor Sickle-shaped weapons with hidden firearms

In the 1991 one-shot sequel Batman: Full Circle, Chill's son Joe Jr. briefly assumes the mantle of Reaper as part of a plan to drive Batman insane. He eventually unmasks Batman, but does not recognize him. Chill attempts to mentally break Batman, who escapes and spares him.

=== The New 52 ===
In The New 52, the Reaper is an inmate of Blackgate Penitentiary. He is among those who escape in a breakout orchestrated by Bane.

=== DC Rebirth ===
In DC Rebirth, an unnamed criminal takes up the mantle of the Reaper.

=== DC All In ===
In DC All In, an unnamed Reaper is introduced as a judge for the White Church courthouse. He and Two-Face work together to maintain order in Gotham's criminal underworld.

== Equipment ==
As the Reaper, Judson Caspian wears a hooded black cloak with armored red leather or cuir bouilli, which prevents bullets and punches from affecting him. The knees and elbows of the red leather armor are tipped with spikes that add more power to blows Caspian inflicts. Caspian also wears a skull-shaped mask with hooks on the mouth to cover up the lower part of the face and red glowing eyes. The Reaper also wields two scythe-shaped weapons, with various other lethal implements contained in the spiked shafts of both weapons. The haft contains a handgun and smoke pellets. The scythes are stored in inverted sheaths on his back, under his cloak.

== See also ==
- Andrea Beaumont
