= Snap case =

Optical disc packaging

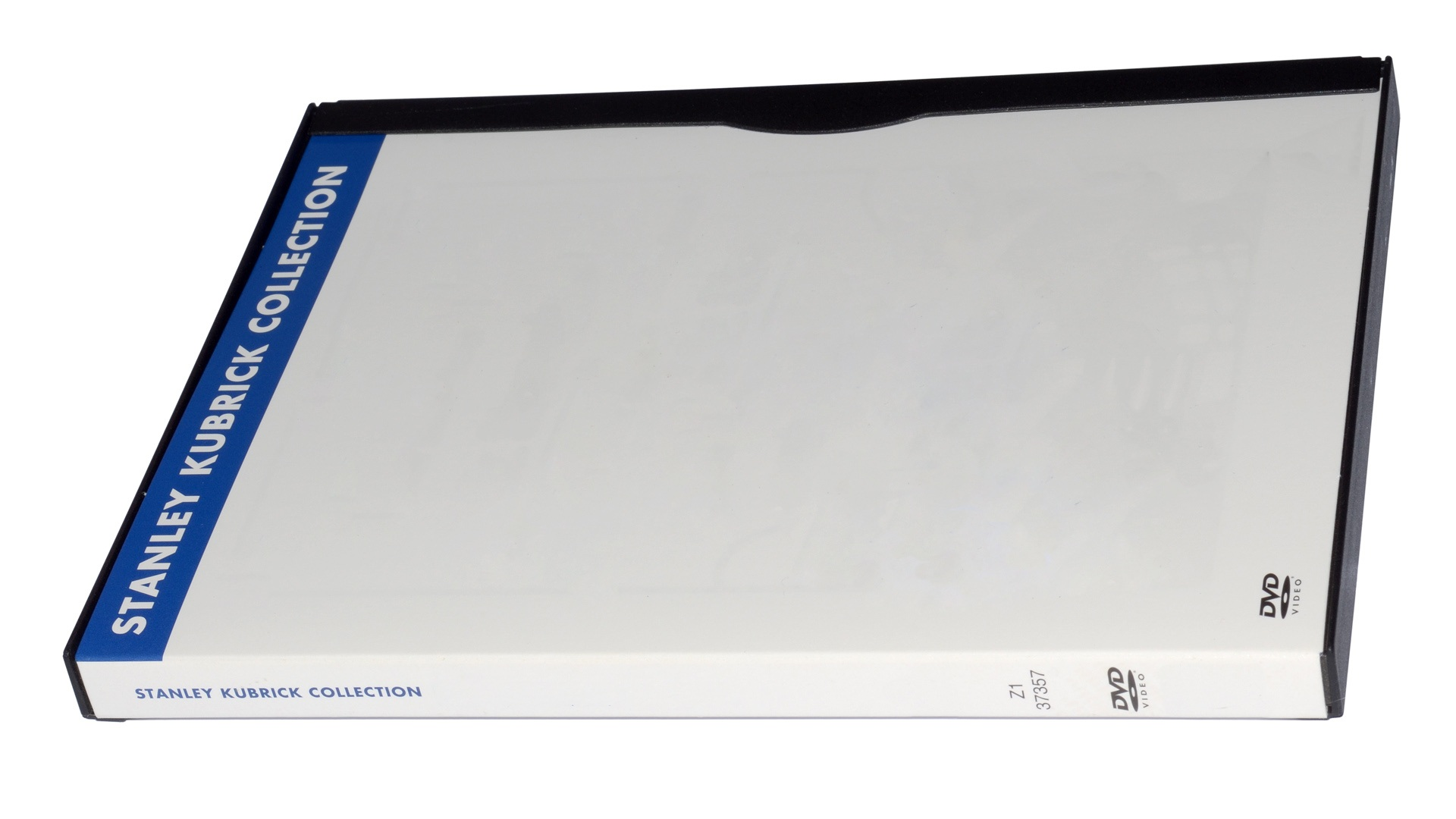
Outside of a DVD snap case. (This would normally feature artwork and text which has been digitally edited out of this photograph.)

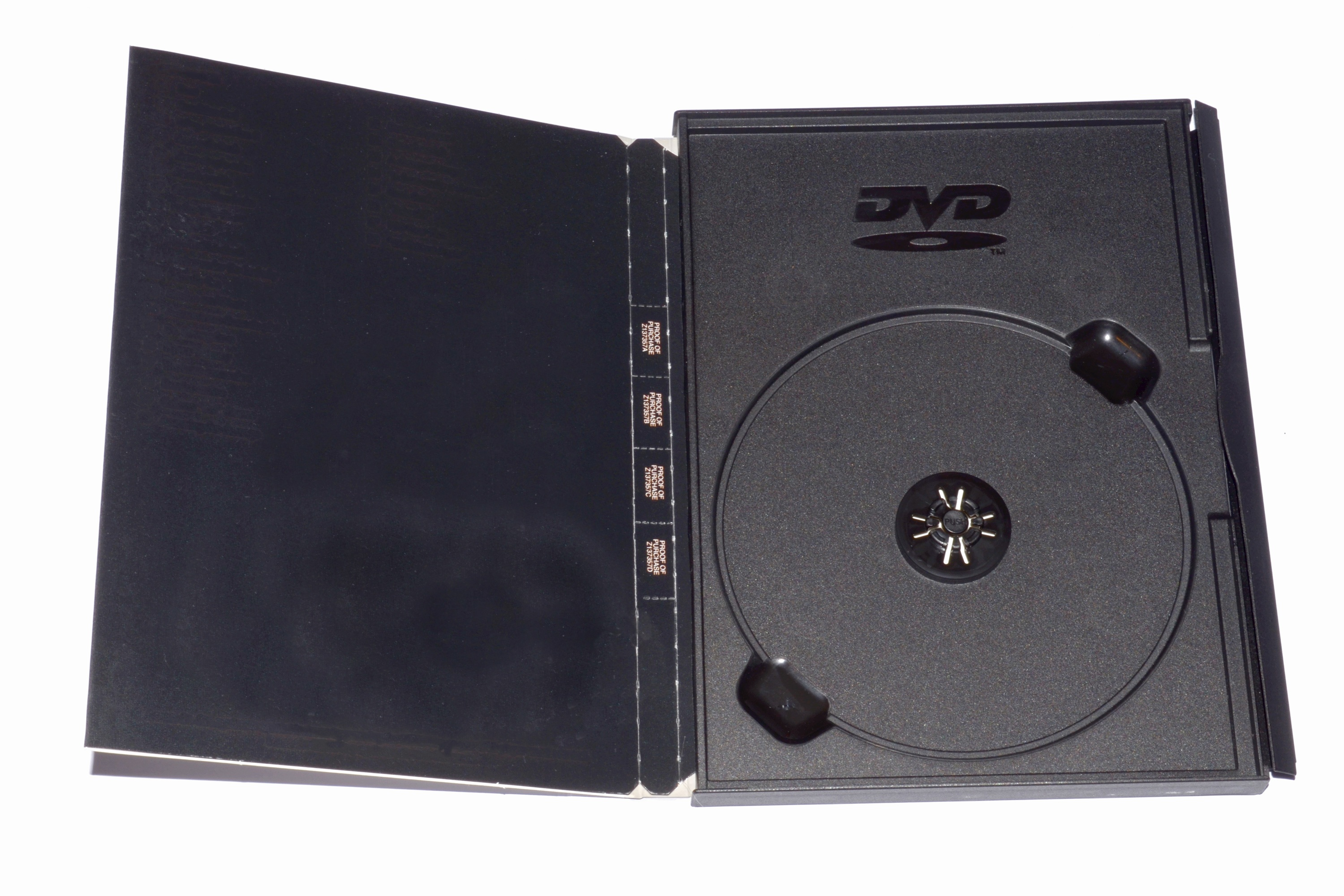
The inside of the same snap case, with the artwork also edited out.

A snap case is a type of optical disc packaging, used for DVDs and CDs, also known as a paperback case, Ivy Hill Snapper, "snapper case", or FLP case.

It consists of a paperboard flap (where the cover art is printed) which is held closed by a narrow plastic strip which has a "snap" closure. The strip is part of a single piece of plastic which forms the disc tray, and protective edges at the top and bottom. The "hinge" is simply created by the thinness of the plastic along the back right corner. The closure forms the right edge of the package and wraps as a single rigid piece around to the front in an L shape (as viewed from either end). Bumps on the inside of the top and bottom edges of the tray fit into notches on the end of the closure in order to create the snap.

It was patented in 1992 by Ivy Hill Packaging, a Time Warner subsidiary that made cardboard LP sleeves and CD longboxes. It allowed them to have an eco-friendly case option which used little plastic and allowed the printing of graphics on the inside cover. It also made good financial sense as it repurposed cardboard-manufacturing machinery still onsite. It was originally used as a prestige format in a square case for Warner Music Group CD-Singles from 1993 to 1997 (when WMG was still Time Warner controlled), but was later adapted as rectangular case for video disc media, starting with Video CD in 1994, then DVDs from 1997 to 2004. The DVD case was mainly used by Time Warner's Warner Home Video unit, including releases from Warner Bros. Pictures, as well as sister companies New Line Home Video and HBO Home Video, as well as various associated labels; MGM/UA Home Video also used this type of packaging for their first DVD releases from 1997, then quit in December 1997 before switching to keep cases in January 1998, (MGM/UA's product was distributed by Warner Home Video at the time, but both companies ended their distribution deal in 1999 after legal battling). The packaging was also used for companies who had third-party distribution deals with Warner, such as Icon Film Distribution in the United Kingdom.

Time Warner gradually switched to DVD keep-cases in 2004 when they sold Ivy Hill to Cinram, who later dropped the format in 2005 due to a lack of interest. By the mid 2000s, Time Warner had switched to a new form of keep case, which reduced the amount of plastic used by removing some non-structural plastic which formed the recycling symbol in the case. The snap case also had an issue where the closure's glue could possibly separate from the case and proved to be less resilient in retail settings, with new product being more vulnerable to damage from shipping and unpacking (as the case and disc could easily be damaged by a utility knife or other retail unpacking tool, which a keep case could repel with only front case damage).

== See also ==
- Jewel case
- Keep case
