= List of Batman Beyond episodes =

This is the list of episodes for the Kids' WB series Batman Beyond.

== Series overview ==
Season	Episodes	Originally released	
Season	Episodes	First released	Last released
1	13	January 10, 1999	May 22, 1999
2	26	September 17, 1999	September 23, 2000
3	13	May 27, 2000	December 18, 2001

== Episodes ==
=== Season 1 (1999) ===
No. overall	No. in season	Title	Directed by	Written by	Original release date	Prod. code	U.S. viewers (millions)
1	1	"Rebirth"	Curt Geda	Story by : Alan Burnett; Teleplay by : Alan Burnett & Paul Dini	January 10, 1999	001	4.16
2	2	"Rebirth"	Curt Geda	Story by : Alan Burnett; Teleplay by : Stan Berkowitz	January 10, 1999	002	4.16
Part 1: In 2019, Bruce Wayne, the original Batman, retires following issues on his last mission. In 2039, a now elderly Bruce rescues high-school student Terrence "Terry" McGinnis from a gang of thugs, who is shocked to discover his secret identity. When Terry's father is murdered for stumbling upon on an illegal project being conducted by Bruce's company, now run by Derek Powers, Terry seeks Bruce's help to investigate the matter. Part 2: Terry steals a high-tech Batsuit from Bruce, in order to pursue Powers. Bruce is reluctantly forced to help Terry, when he learns Powers is selling a deadly nerve gas to a foreign power, its shipment being overseen by his bodyguard Mr. Fixx, the man who murdered Terry's father. The move not only cements a partnership between Bruce and Terry, bringing forth a new Batman, but also has repercussions for Powers when he attempts to prevent the crime fighter interfering his plans.
3	3	"Black Out"	Dan Riba	Robert Goodman	January 30, 1999	003	N/A
Terry, now working for Bruce, faces off against notorious shapeshifting mercenary Inque. The pair suspect Powers is seeking an important government contract by using her to sabotage Foxteca, a rival company formed by Lucius Fox's son. The matter soon leads to a tense situation when Inque infiltrates the Batcave to stop their interference.
4	4	"Golem"	Butch Lukic	Hilary J. Bader	February 6, 1999	004	N/A
Willie Watt, a high school nerd who has been bullied one too many times, steals a construction robot from his father to scare his chief tormentor, Nelson Nash. But when Batman tries to stop the robot, a freak accident causes its control system to become bonded to Willie mentally, giving him more power than he ever dreamed of in his life.
5	5	"The Winning Edge"	Yukio Suzuki	Rich Fogel	April 10, 1999	005	N/A
Batman investigates when Bruce discovers a new illegal patch called "Slappers" being used by some of Hill High's students contains the super steroid Venom. Initially suspecting Bruce's old enemy Bane, Batman discovers someone else is involved, after learning an elderly Bane is bedridden after years of using Venom.
6	6	"Dead Man's Hand"	Dan Riba	Stan Berkowitz	March 20, 1999	006	N/A
Following a breakup with his girlfriend Dana, Terry encounters the beautiful Melanie, who falls in love with him. At the same time, Terry's work as Batman sees him pursuing the Royal Flush Gang, an old foe of Bruce's who have returned to Neo-Gotham, unaware that Melanie is one of its members, a secret that he soon finds out.
7	7	"Meltdown"	Curt Geda	Written by : Hilary J. Bader & Alan Burnett; Story by : Hilary J. Bader	February 13, 1999	007	N/A
Powers agrees to provide Victor Fries, a former foe of Bruce's, with a new body that can mitigate his mutated condition. Fries takes advantage of his new life to seek redemption, until his condition begins to reassert itself. Batman is forced to step in when Powers tries to kill him and examine his body for answers, after hoping the treatment can avert a transformation he is undergoing.
8	8	"Heroes"	Butch Lukic	Rich Fogel	February 20, 1999	008	N/A
Following an experiment that goes awry, a group of scientist gain superhero powers and form The Terrific Trio. Although a media sensation in Neo-Gotham, Batman finds himself going up against them when the scientist begin to discover their condition was not an accident, especially when the military tries to get rid of them.
9	9	"Spellbound"	Butch Lukic	Robert Goodman	May 1, 1999	009	3.6/17
Terry is convinced a fellow student, Chelsea, was not herself when she dumps her father's priceless antique in a nearby river. After others begin exhibiting strange behaviours, both he and Bruce discover they were all victims of a villain called Spellbinder, who is using hypnotic technology to orchestrate a string of robberies.
10	10	"Shriek"	Curt Geda	Stan Berkowitz	March 13, 1999	010	N/A
Powers bails out Walter Shreeve, a sound engineer on the verge of bankruptcy, so he can use his acoustic technology to drive Bruce insane and reduce his control over Wayne-Powers. Terry is forced to become a detective to prove his mentor is being targeted, only to become involved in stopping Shreeve, who operates now as Shriek with an acoustic powered suit.
11	11	"A Touch of Curaré"	Dan Riba	Hilary J. Bader	May 15, 1999	011	3.6/14
A deadly assassin named Curaré arrives in Neo-Gotham, on a contract to assassinate Sam Young, the city's District Attorney. In protecting him as Batman, Terry finds himself encountering Sam's wife Barbara Gordon, the former Batgirl turned Police Commissioner, leading to surprising revelations about her past with Bruce.
12	12	"Disappearing Inque"	Curt Geda	Stan Berkowitz	May 8, 1999	012	3.9/17
A fired cryogenics worker frees Inque, after falling in love with her. After Batman attempts to stop her escape, Bruce reveals she is in need of chemicals that can help her recover her human shape, as her mutated condition now prevents this. But in going after her, Bruce is forced to take drastic action when Terry's life is endangered.
13	13	"Ascension"	Yukio Suzuki	Robert Goodman	May 22, 1999	013	4.0/20
Powers is forced to hand over control of Wayne-Powers to his son Paxton, after learning his condition is worsening. After a board meeting over this leads to Powers being exposed as Blight, a villain whom Batman had dealings with before, Paxton attempts to use the situation to his own benefit, even if it means permanently removing his father from his life.

=== Season 2 (1999–2000) ===
No. overall	No. in season	Title	Directed by	Written by	Original release date	Prod. code
14	1	"Splicers"	Curt Geda	Evan Dorkin & Sarah Dyer	September 18, 1999	016
Sam Young attempts to outlaw a new body modification trend amongst teenager in Neo-Gotham called splicing, combining human DNA with that of animals, after finding it causes a rise in aggressive behaviour. The process' creator, Dr. Abel Cuvier, soon attempts to prevent his work being stopped, prompting Terry to stop this as Batman, and forming a bond with Bruce's dog Ace.
15	2	"Earth Mover"	Dan Riba	Story by : Stan Berkowitz & Alan Burnett; Teleplay by : Stan Berkowitz	September 25, 1999	015
Terry is forced to become Batman to protect a fellow student, Jackie Wallace, and her foster father Bill, when they are attacked by man-shaped creatures made of earth. In investigating the motives for the attack, Batman discovers everything is linked to an accident with Jackie's biological father and the dumping of nuclear waste.
16	3	"Joyride"	Butch Lukic	Stan Berkowitz	October 2, 1999	014
A group of Jokerz steal a prototype military vehicle, whereupon they go on a rampage of destruction across Neo-Gotham. Batman is forced to team up with the vehicle's designer, who reveals the vehicle uses a nuclear reactor that they found has a design flaw. Batman must shut it down, before the reactor goes critical and triggers a nuclear explosion.
17	4	"Lost Soul"	Butch Lukic	Stan Berkowitz	October 9, 1999	017
The virtual soul of deceased tycoon Robert Vance is revived by his grandson Bobby, whereupon he becomes a literal "ghost in the machine" to take over systems in Neo-Gotham. When Terry loses his Batsuit to Vance's control, he is forced to use Bruce's equipment to stop him, especially when Vance intends to download himself into Bobby's body to come back to life for real.
18	5	"Bloodsport"	Dan Riba	Rich Fogel	October 23, 1999	018
A cybernetically enhanced big-game hunter called the Stalker arrives in Neo-Gotham, with plans to hunt down his latest prey - Batman. Terry soon finds his life in jeopardy with the Stalker's tactics, though even when he manages to evade them, matters are made worse when his brother Matt is abducted as bait to lure him into a deadly trap.
19	6	"Hidden Agenda"	Curt Geda	Story by : Shaun McLaughlin & Hilary J. Bader; Teleplay by : Hilary J. Bader	October 16, 1999	019
Terry is concerned when his friend Max Gibson, a fellow Hill High student, reveals she has created a program to identify who the new Batman is. Matters soon worsen when Max is targeted by a gang of Jokerz, neither aware that their leader is Carter Wilson, another Hill High student, who seeks revenge against Max for outperforming him at school.
20	7	"Once Burned"	Butch Lukic	Stan Berkowitz	November 6, 1999	020
Batman is surprised when Ten returns to Neo-Gotham and attempts to rob a group of criminals who run a high-stakes poker game. When Terry meets Ten's alter ego, Melanie, she reveals she is having to steal to rescue the Royal Flush Gang from a group of Jokerz, leaving Terry conflicted over whether he should trust her as Batman, if it means risking his relationship with Dana.
21	8	"Hooked Up"	Dan Riba	Robert Goodman	November 13, 1999	021
Terry investigates a spate of teenage runaways turning up comatose in hospital, soon learning all the victims became addicted to virtual reality fantasies. When Max offers to help, she soon risks putting her friend in danger, after Batman discovers the VR simulations are the product of Spellbinder, as part of a new scheme to rob people.
22	9	"Rats"	Curt Geda	Rich Fogel	November 20, 1999	022
Dana finally has enough of Terry standing her up on dates, so is surprised when she learns she has a secret admirer in the form of Patrick Fitz - a young man with a rat-like appearance, who controls Neo-Gotham's rat population in the sewer. When Terry learns Dana is missing, he becomes Batman to search for her, and soon discovers Patrick is unwilling to let her go.
23	10	"Mind Games"	Butch Lukic	Alan Burnett	December 4, 1999	023
Terry finds himself mysterious visited by visions of a young girl named Tamara, whom he saved from a car accident with her parents. He and Bruce discover the girl was taken from her family because of her extraordinary physic powers, and that her captors, a group of equally powerful physics known as the Brain Trust, have little care for her well-being.
24	11	"Revenant"	Kyung-Won Lim	Hilary J. Bader	December 11, 1999	024
Hill High is plagued by events believed to be caused by a ghost, but Terry discovers they are the work of Willie Watt. Visiting him, he learns Watt has developed powerful new psychic/extrasensory abilities. Exposed by this meeting, Watt escapes, and returns to Hill High to exact revenge against those who wronged him in the past.
25	12	"Babel"	Curt Geda	Stan Berkowitz	January 8, 2000	025
Shriek returns to Neo-Gotham to seek revenge on Batman, using his sound engineering skills to create a device that can impact the speech of the city's citizens. With everyone unable to speak properly because of this, Shriek offers to return things to normal if Batman gives himself up, forcing Terry to determine what value he holds to being a hero.
26	13	"Terry's Friend Dates a Robot"	Dan Riba	Story by : Paul Dini; Teleplay by : John P. McCann	January 15, 2000	026
Howard Groote, a student seeking to be popular, purchases a female synthoid he names Cynthia, programmed to be fully devoted to him. However, Terry discovers her creation was not only illegal, but her programming has made her highly possessive of Howard, which soon leads him to fear for the safety of his fellow students when they attend a party at Howard's house.
27	14	"Eyewitness"	Butch Lukic	Story by : Rich Fogel; Teleplay by : Hilary J. Bader	January 22, 2000	027
Commissioner Gordon informs Bruce she must arrest Terry, after she witnessed Batman killing deranged bomber Mad Stan. However, Terry insist he is innocent, prompting his mentor to investigate whilst he evades the police. Bruce soon determines someone is attempting to frame his protege, after finding security footage of the incident is distorted.
28	15	"Zeta"	Dan Riba	Robert Goodman	April 8, 2000	028
Terry is surprised when government agents go after a teacher at Hill High, whom he noticed was behaving oddly. Both he and Max soon find out the teacher is actually a sophisticated sythoid called Zeta, programmed for covert operations. But when Batman intervenes to assist in capturing it, he learns Zeta has a conscience, leaving him concerned over what to do. Note: This episode leads into the spin-off series The Zeta Project.
29	16	"The Last Resort"	Curt Geda	Stan Berkowitz	March 4, 2000	029
Parents in Neo-Gotham willingly turn to a new reform program called "the Ranch" to help deal with their troubled children. However, Terry discovers evidence that the program's creator, Dr. David Wheeler, is tormenting the Ranch's residents with brainwashing, prompting him to seek evidence by infiltrating the reform facility itself.
30	17	"Final Cut"	Butch Lukic	Story by : Hilary J. Bader & Alan Burnett; Teleplay by : Hilary J. Bader	February 5, 2000	030
Curaré decimates the League of Assassins to avoid being killed for her past failure. Her last target is Mutro Botha, who happens to be in Neo-Gotham. To prevent being attacked, Botha coerces Batman to protect him, having planted a bomb in the city. With Bruce out of town, Terry turns to Max for aid in overcoming a dangerous situation.
31	18	"Armory"	Kyung-Won Lim	John P. McCann	March 11, 2000	031
Weapons designer Big Jim Tate loses his job, and becomes desperate for money to support his family that he soon turns to a life of crime. Batman finds himself attempting to stop him steal components for a new weapon, which Tate is selling as part of an illegal arms deal, unaware of the danger he is placing his family in.
32	19	"Sneak Peek"	Dan Riba	Story by : Alan Burnett; Teleplay by : Stan Berkowitz	March 25, 2000	032
Arrogant reporter Ian Peek is a hit sensation in Neo-Gotham for his expose pieces on several famous residents, thanks to a hi-tech belt that allows him to become incorporeal and thus spy on them. When Peek manages to get footage of Batman's secret identity, he threatens to expose his secret on his television program, leaving Terry concerned for his future.
33	20	"Plague"	Butch Lukic	Rich Fogel	April 15, 2000	033
Master criminal False-Face, able to disguise his physical appearance, steals a deadly virus and has it smuggled into Neo-Gotham for his employers, a criminal organization named Kobra. Batman becomes involved in the search for the virus, when he learns the government has brought in his old foe the Stalker to help find it before Kobra unleashes it on the public.
34	21	"The Eggbaby"	James Tucker	Story by : Hilary J. Bader & Alan Burnett; Teleplay by : Hilary J. Bader	April 1, 2000	034
Terry finds his life complicated when he is forced to look after a computer-simulated "baby" as part of a school project. Which makes things hard for him as Batman when he goes after a family of jewel thieves, whose matriarch is seeking to recover and reunite with a collection of priceless rubies they once stole before with their husband. Note: This episode later went on to win Bruce Timm the 2001 Daytime Emmy Award for Outstanding Special Class Animated Program.
35	22	"April Moon"	Butch Lukic	Story by : Stan Berkowitz & James Tucker; Teleplay by : Stan Berkowitz	April 22, 2000	035
Batman finds himself facing a gang of street punks committing robberies with the aid of bionic implants created by bionics designer Peter Corso. However, he learns Corso is doing so because the gang are holding his wife to ransom. Learning the implants have a kill-switch that can destroy them, Batman is forced to find it out when Corso is reluctant to endanger his wife.
36	23	"Payback"	Kyoung-Won Lim	Robert Goodman	May 13, 2000	036
Batman is forced to intervene when a figure calling themselves Payback targets several individuals across Neo-Gotham. A link is discovered between Payback's victims, and several troubled teenagers who belong a therapy group at the Gotham Youth Counseling Center, leading Terry to go undercover in order to uncover Payback's identity.
37	24	"Sentries of the Last Cosmos"	Dan Riba	John Shirley & Rich Fogel	May 6, 2000	037
Simon Harper, creator of the VR game Sentries of the Last Cosmos, recruits three of its best players to fight off against a real-life threat from "The Dark Regent". However, Batman finds them destroying a database in Gotham's Hall of Records, leading him to uncovering truths behind the game itself, and a major deception on Harper's part. Note: This episode featured a character who was inspired by the real-life writers Bruce Vilanch and Gary Gygax.
38	25	"Big Time"	James Tucker	Story by : Robert Goodman & Tom Ruegger; Teleplay by : Robert Goodman	October 7, 2000	038
Terry decides to help his old friend Charlie "Big Time" Bigelow, recently released from prison, get a job at Wayne-Powers. However, Charlie is working for a gang of thieves who seek to steal a plant growth chemical for a rival company. When Batman foils the heist, Charlie is accidentally exposed to the chemical, mutating him, and leading him into a violent rage against his partners.
39	26	"Untouchable"	Dan Riba	Hilary J. Bader	September 23, 2000	039
Batman finds himself facing a villain called the Repeller who is stealing isotopes for some criminal clients. Bruce recognizes the forcefield technology they use as the same from a medical project Wayne-Powers is conducting with immune-deficient patients. Terry investigates the project's staff, but finds himself being attracted to a young female patient in the process.

=== Season 3 (2000–2001) ===
No. overall	No. in season	Title	Directed by	Written by	Original release date	Prod. code
40	1	"Where's Terry?"	Yukio Suzuki	Rich Fogel	May 27, 2000	040
During a date, Terry spots a suspicious person heading into Neo-Gotham's abandoned subway tunnels, and investigates as Batman, only to walk into a trap created by Shriek. When Bruce discovers Terry is not responding to his calls, he is forced to search for him, reluctantly accepting help from Max who is equally concerned for her friend's safety.
41	2	"Ace in the Hole"	James Tucker	Hilary J. Bader	August 19, 2000	041
Bruce is surprised when Terry reveals that Ace went wild and ran from him after seeing a strange man. The pair soon learn the man is Ronny Boxer, an individual responsible for promoting illegal dog fights. Whilst Terry pursues him, Bruce reflects back on the events that led to him meeting Ace, neither aware Boxer also knows the dog as well.
42	3	"King's Ransom"	Butch Lukic	Rich Fogel	September 16, 2000	042
King of the Royal Flush Gang becomes disillusioned with his role, and so leads the gang to kidnap Paxton after he double-crosses them over a job. However, Paxton decides to use the gang to his own ends, offering them vast riches if they can help strengthen his position by eliminating Bruce Wayne, just as he and Terry discover how corrupt he has become as head of Wayne-Powers.
43	4	"Betrayal"	Kyung-Won Lim	Story by : Stan Berkowitz & Robert Goodman; Teleplay by : Stan Berkowitz	December 9, 2000	043
Big Time returns to Neo-Gotham with a new partner, Major, but goes behind his back to have Terry kidnapped so they can resume their old friendship. As Bruce works to bring him his Batsuit, Terry is forced to confront his friend over his criminal actions, all while keeping alive when Big Time's actions are not well received by Major.
44	5	"Out of the Past"	James Tucker	Paul Dini	October 21, 2000	044
Bruce is surprised on his birthday when he is reunited with his former lover Talia al Ghul, who offers him a chance to regain his youth with a Lazarus Pit. In a moment of weakness, Bruce accepts, but soon regrets the decision. However, he and Terry soon learn Talia is not all she seems to be, and that Bruce has been led into a trap by an old foe of his past.
45	6	"Speak No Evil"	Dan Riba	Stan Berkowitz	November 4, 2000	045
Batman encounters a genetically enhanced gorilla called Fingers, who was spliced with human levels of intelligence. Fingers reveals he was captured and sold by animal conservationist James Van Dyle, and is seeking him out for answers about his mother. Batman agrees, when he learns Van Dyle's animal preserve is a front for poaching.
46	7	"Inqueling"	Butch Lukic	Hilary J. Bader	September 30, 2000	046
Inque is betrayed by her latest employer, Winchell, who weakens her body with an experimental weapon, leading her to contact her daughter Deanna for help. Batman is soon after her, when he learns about Winchell's involvement with Inque, and discovers mother and daughter are breaking into mutagenic labs for ingredients for a cure.
47	8	"Unmasked"	Kyung-Won Lim	Hilary J. Bader	December 18, 2001	047
At a school fundraiser, Max argues that Terry should tell those he loves about his role as Batman. To counter her point, Terry recounts to her about a mission in which he accidentally exposed his identity to a young child named Miguel Diaz. When Diaz was kidnapped by Kobra in hopes of identifying Batman, Terry attempts to rectify his mistake by rescuing the kid. Note: This episode was scheduled to air on September 14, 2001, but was replaced by a re-airing of "Hooked Up" due to its terrorism-related content in the wake of the September 11 attacks earlier that week. The episode would instead premiere on Cartoon Network's Toonami block.
48	9	"Curse of the Kobra"	James Tucker	Rich Fogel	February 3, 2001	048
49	10	"Curse of the Kobra"	Dan Riba	Story by : Rich Fogel; Teleplay by : Stan Berkowitz	February 10, 2001	049
Part 1: After failing to stop Kobra stealing a powerful thermal bomb from a government building, Terry is sent by Bruce to see his old friend Kairi Tanaka to brush up on his combat skills. In doing so, Terry befriends one of her other students, a young man named Zander, who joins him and Max for a dinner break. However, neither are aware Zander is not who they seem to be. Part 2: With Max kidnapped by Zander, the current leader of Kobra, an injured Terry focuses on rescuing her. However, both find themselves working together when they learn Kobra is splicing its members with stolen dinosaur DNA, with Zander hoping to use the stolen bomb to alter Earth's climate for his new creations to survive.
50	11	"The Call"	Butch Lukic	Story by : Paul Dini & Alan Burnett; Teleplay by : Rich Fogel & Hilary J. Bader	November 11, 2000	050
51	12	"The Call"	Butch Lukic	Story by : Paul Dini & Alan Burnett; Teleplay by : Stan Berkowitz	November 18, 2000	051
Part 1: Bruce is surprised when his old ally Superman arrives in the Batcave, seeking help to root out a traitor in the Justice League. Terry agrees to assist as Batman, whereupon he finds some hostility to his presence. But as he investigates Superman's claim, he soon has his suspicions when something happens during a League mission. Part 2: With evidence showing Superman has gone rogue, Batman rallies assistance from the League when another member backs up his suspicions. But when confronting the Kryptonian, they soon learn something is off about him. Only by persisting in their efforts to stop him does Batman and the League discover the truth behind Superman's recent actions and the real traitor.
52	13	"Countdown"	Kyung-Won Lim	Rich Fogel & Paul Dini	April 7, 2001	052
Zeta returns to Neo-Gotham with his new companion Ro to look for his creator. However, a run-in with NSA agents trying to capture him leads Zeta to be captured by Mad Stan. Batman comes to Ro's aid to help her locate Zeta, only to learn that Stan is using her friend as a walking time-bomb in his latest destructive plot.

== Film ==
Title	Directed by	Written by	Movie No.	Released
Batman Beyond: Return of the Joker	Curt Geda	Paul Dini	003	December 12, 2000
After having seemingly died nearly four decades ago, the Joker mysteriously reappears in Gotham City. Now fully aware of all of the original Batman's secrets, he begins targeting people close to both Bruce and his successor Terry. Terry starts to investigate and discovers the details of what happened on the night that Bruce battled the Joker for the last time. When Joker plans to use a military defense satellite to destroy Gotham City, a climactic showdown begins between the original Batman's successor and his deadliest nemesis.

== Short ==
No.	Title	Directed by	Written by	Original release date
1	"Darwyn Cooke's Batman Beyond"	Darwyn Cooke	Darwyn Cooke	April 23, 2014
Bruce Wayne and Terry McGinnis confront a very familiar foe.

== Crossovers ==
Batman Beyond has had multiple crossovers with other series in the DC Animated Universe.

The Zeta Project

No.	Title	Directed by	Written by	Original release date
8	"Shadows"	Tim Maltby	Rich Fogel	April 7, 2001
The destruction caused by a fight between Zeta and Infiltration Unit 7 causes Batman to believe that Zeta is endangering his companion Ro.

Static Shock

No.	Title	Directed by	Written by	Original release date
40	"Future Shock"	Vic Dal Chele	Stan Berkowitz	January 17, 2004
Static is sent 40 years into the future, where he has to help the Batman of that era, Terry McGinnis, save a captured superhero: Static's future self.

Justice League Unlimited

No.	Title	Directed by	Written by	Original release date
12	"The Once and Future Thing Part 1: Weird Western Tales"	Dan Riba	Dwayne McDuffie	January 22, 2005
Batman, Wonder Woman, and Green Lantern chase Chronos into the past, where they team up with some of the greatest DC heroes of the Old West. After defeating stolen future tech in that era, they again follow Chronos to the future. Warhawk, a member of the future Justice League, is revealed to be the son of Green Lantern and Hawkgirl.
13	"The Once and Future Thing Part 2: Time Warped"	Joaquim Dos Santos	Dwayne McDuffie	January 29, 2005
Batman, Green Lantern, and Wonder Woman chase Chronos into the Neo-Gotham City of Batman Beyond, just in time to face a battle with a group of Jokerz beside that era's Justice League. The time travelers are taken to the Justice League Unlimited refuge. An older Bruce Wayne reveals the street gang they fought together was enhanced by Chronos, who led them to kill the rest of the League of that era. The combined heroes defeat the retooled Jokerz, and Batman traps Chronos in a time loop of him arguing with his wife right before he began time traveling.
26	"Epilogue"	Dan Riba	Dwayne McDuffie	July 23, 2005
In the future of Batman Beyond, Amanda Waller reveals to an older Terry McGinnis she created the project "Batman Beyond" to continue Bruce Wayne's work. Though initially Terry believed that he was a clone of Bruce Wayne, Waller states that Bruce is instead Terry's biological father. The truth being revealed to Terry allows him to let go of his anger and fear. He calls his long-time girlfriend Dana in preparation to ask her to marry him. Note: The episode acts as the Justice League season finale, as a crossover, and as the final Batman Beyond episode. It contains many references to prior episodes of Justice League, Batman Beyond and Batman: The Animated Series such as the death of Terry's father, Ace from the episode "Wild Cards", the future Justice League, much of Terry's rogues gallery, the Gray Ghost and Andrea Beaumont. The final scene also bears a resemblance to the first scene of "On Leather Wings" (the first episode of Batman: The Animated Series).
