= Batman (Terry McGinnis) =

Fictional DC comics character

Terry McGinnis Batman
- Terry McGinnis as Batman

Publication information
- Publisher: DC Comics
- First appearance: Batman Beyond "Rebirth, Part 1 (1999)"
- First comic appearance: Batman Beyond #1 (March 1999)
- Created by: Paul Dini (writer); Bruce Timm (character designer); Alan Burnett (story) (based on Batman by Bob Kane and Bill Finger)
- Voiced by: Will Friedle

In-story information
- Full name: Terrence McGinnis
- Species: Human
- Team affiliations: Justice League Unlimited; Batman Family
- Partnerships: Bruce Wayne (genetic/surrogate father); Barbara Gordon; Dick Grayson (comics); Damian Wayne (comics); Matt McGinnis (brother); Helena Wayne (half-sister); Mary McGinnis (mother); Warren McGinnis (legal father)
- Notable aliases: Batman Beyond; Batman of the Future; The Tomorrow Knight
- Abilities: Skilled martial artist, street fighter, and hand-to-hand combatant; Expert detective; Utilizes high-tech equipment and weapons; High intellect

Terrence "Terry" McGinnis, also known as Batman Beyond or Batman of the Future after his animated television series to distinguish him from his predecessor Bruce Wayne, is a superhero appearing in media published by DC Entertainment. The character was created by Bruce Timm and Paul Dini and first appeared in the pilot episode of Batman Beyond (1999–2001) set in the DC Animated Universe, voiced by Will Friedle.

Terry is the vigilante known as Batman in the future, having taken over the mantle after the aging Bruce Wayne retired. A separate version of the character was introduced in the 2023 Murphyverse graphic novel Batman: Beyond the White Knight.

== Publication history ==
McGinnis was created for the Batman Beyond animated television series, as a continuation of Batman: The Animated Series and The New Batman Adventures originally meant as a character for the DCAU. For a long time, he was not considered a character for the main DC Universe. Countdown to Final Crisis introduced Earth-12, an alternate universe with its version of Terry McGinnis and other Beyond-like characters. In times, it is revealed that this universe is where the DCAU situates. Superman/Batman (comic book) #22 (2005, which predates Superman/Batman Annual 4) was the first comic to depict McGinnis as existing in the future of Batman and the characters of the mainstream comic book DCU. In Batman #700, Terry's mentor is not Bruce, but Damian Wayne, who had become the third Batman after Bruce Wayne and Dick Grayson (in other words, Terry would be the fourth Batman).

The 2010 story Superman/Batman Annual #4 returned to the DCAU Terry's story, as later did a 2011 Batman Beyond miniseries. In 2012, DC began publishing three Terry-related comic books: Batman Beyond and Justice League Beyond most prominently, though the character also appears in Superman Beyond. Terry officially entered mainstream DC continuity in the 2014 New 52 maxiseries, The New 52: Futures End. It has since then produced two separate comic book series, the first in 2015, where Tim Drake replaced Terry as Batman; and the second one in 2016, as part of DC Rebirth, where Terry has become Batman once again inheriting the cowl from the 2nd Batman Damian Wayne. Terry's story continued in the Batman Beyond series with Batman Beyond (vol.6) published in 2016, Batman Beyond: Neo-year series from 2022, and then the Batman Beyond: Neo-Gothic series 2023.

== Fictional character biography ==
=== Batman Beyond ===
Terry was born in Gotham City to Warren and Mary McGinnis, a research scientist at Wayne-Powers and an astronomer at Astro-Tech, respectively. As a friend of the youthful racketeer Charlie "Big Time" Bigelow, Terry as a small-time criminal had numerous run-ins with the Gotham City Police at age fourteen, while his parents were going through a divorce, even serving a three-month stint in juvenile hall.

A teenage Terry McGinnis; from the animated series Batman Beyond.

Twenty years after Batman's disappearance from Gotham, due to Bruce Wayne's retirement on account of a cardiovascular disease, Terry finds himself on the run from the Jokerz, another street gang, who have modelled themselves after the long-dead legendary criminal, the Joker. Terry flees onto the grounds of Wayne Manor, where an aged Bruce comes to his defense and together they subdue and ward off the Jokerz. The strain of the fight places substantial stress on Bruce's weak heart, so Terry helps Bruce into the mansion and gets him his medication; Bruce proceeds to fall asleep afterward. Terry attempts to leave, but Bruce's dog Ace stops him with hostility. He then tries to call his father but then notices a bat stuck inside a grandfather clock. As he tries to free it he stumbles upon the entrance to the Batcave and realizes that Bruce was the city's heroic Dark Knight. He is then forced out by an enraged Bruce.

Terry returns home to find his father murdered, ostensibly by the Jokerz. He later discovers that Derek Powers (who has assumed leadership of a merged Wayne-Powers) ordered Warren's death after the latter discovered Powers' plan to mass-produce biological weapons. Powers' right-hand man, Mr. Fixx, leads a raid on the McGinnis home and shoots Warren McGinnis. (In the comic books, he orders one of his henchmen, Jake Chill, who is a great grand-nephew of Joe Chill, the one who murdered Bruce's parents, to shoot Warren). Terry then seeks Bruce's assistance in bringing Powers down, but cannot convince the old man to inflict swift justice - Bruce is still shaken from an ordeal 20 years earlier of having relied on a handgun for self-defense (the event that forced him to retire as Batman for good), as well as the traumatic event of the Joker's death and Tim Drake's psychological torture in the flashbacks of Batman Beyond: Return of the Joker and the limitations of his age. Bruce suggests that Terry take the evidence against Powers to Police Commissioner Barbara Gordon, his former partner and the retired Batgirl. However, after Powers reclaims the evidence in a violent scuffle, Terry takes matters into his own hands and steals Bruce's last, advanced Batsuit, which had caught his eye. Despite some initial mistrust, their similar backgrounds and the risks of a pandemic that Powers' viral weapons might cause convince Bruce to aid Terry. Terry successfully derails Powers' plan, exposing him to his weapons in the process, resulting in his mutation into Blight.

Reminded by Terry of why he started crime-fighting and convinced that there is still a need for a Batman, Bruce accepts Terry as his protégé and successor, training him as Gotham's new Dark Knight under the cover of being a hired personal assistant. In addition, Bruce assists Terry in the field, primarily by keeping in continual contact with him from the Batcave, while also helping him out in the field occasionally and if necessary. Beyond the vigilante duties as Batman, Terry is also Bruce's chauffeur and assists with Bruce's daily business and personal tasks at his home and office, which also allows him to earn money to support his family. Terry's youth and history as a juvenile delinquent provide the perfect cover, ensuring no one suspects he is Batman. As a result, he doesn't have to emulate Bruce by pretending to be shallow and irresponsible to protect his identity. This unique background motivates him to offer redemption to criminals who show genuine remorse, directly contrasting with Bruce's deep-seated hatred for those who harm the innocent. In time, the pair develops a bond of trust and respect and confides in each other not only in their mutual missions but also in life issues as well, much like father and son. Bruce would even trust Terry over Barbara Gordon's words when the villain Spellbinder frames Terry for murder with another one of his illusions. While getting his own unique rogues' gallery, in addition to contending with some of his mentor's former foes including the resurrected Joker, Terry also makes allies, such as high school student Maxine Gibson, and despite initial hostility between them, even Commissioner Gordon herself (in the comics, he also eventually meets and works with Bruce's other ex-partner, the former Robin/Nightwing, Dick Grayson). He also meets Bruce's old allies Superman and the Justice League, even being offered full-time membership after he saves them from Starro's world takeover scheme. However, he turns it down, preferring to remain a reserved member and work alone as his mentor did.

After Powers' criminal identity is exposed and he finally brings retribution to his father's killer, Terry decides to continue his role as Batman, aware of the differences he makes and to atone for his past sins, in the hope that it is his chance at redemption. Later in his career as Batman, after Bruce began suffering from kidney failure, he ran a DNA test for suitable donors and discovered that not only was he a suitable match, but the perfect one. He then learns that he is the biological son of his mentor, who had discovered the truth himself sometime before but kept quiet out of respect for Warren, who raised Terry. Seeking answers, Terry then has a confrontation with an elderly Amanda Waller, Bruce's acquaintance from his days with the Justice League, who reveals that she engineered his origin to create a replacement Batman for Bruce. Terry learns that Bruce is his biological father; Waller used nanotechnology to ensure that Bruce’s DNA overwrote the DNA in Warren McGinnis' reproductive cells. She had intended to take things one step forward and recreate the tragic circumstances that drove Bruce into becoming Batman (by hiring the Phantasm to murder the young boy's parents in front of him), but her hired assassin refused at the last minute, forcing Waller to cancel the project, although Warren's eventual murder by criminals ironically cemented Terry's destiny to become the next Batman. In conclusion, Waller tells Terry that while he does not possess Bruce's level of deduction and analytical skills, he does possess the same heart. Initially disillusioned with who he was, Terry eventually reconciles with the truth and continues to have a relationship with Bruce, while also planning on proposing to his longtime girlfriend, Dana Tan. He is also revealed to have joined the Justice League, but like Bruce before him, he is only a part-time member.

=== Project Batman Beyond ===
In the Justice League Unlimited episode "Epilogue", which takes place 15 years after Batman Beyond, Terry has become a remarkable superhero in his own right, whose life as Batman mirrors his predecessor's, even oddly resembles him, and later discovers the truth about his paternity. When Bruce requires tissue for the cloning of a kidney to transplant, Terry is checked for compatibility. To his surprise, his DNA is similar to Bruce's. After hesitating for a time, he runs a DNA test and finds out that Bruce is his biological father. Terry seeks Amanda Waller, the only person in the world he believes can answer his questions, before confronting Bruce. As he does so, he imagines scenarios where he leaves the people vital to himself because he believes his life was a lie.

Terry vents some of his frustration about Bruce and his plans to Waller, only to be surprised when Waller reveals that it was not Bruce responsible for Terry's genetic makeup – it was her doing, without Bruce's consent or even his express knowledge.

Decades earlier, Waller was the government liaison to the Justice League, and she saw that Batman was the most capable member of the League; despite lacking any powers, his willpower, physical strength, and acute intelligence made him the most balanced and reliable fighter in the entire League. In addition, based on his compassion for the dying original Royal Flush Gang member, Ace, Batman's virtue makes him the League's conscience. Because of this, Waller slowly began to respect and trust Bruce Wayne. However, Waller noticed Batman was getting older and increasingly unable to handle the day-to-day intensities of crimefighting. She knew that one day Batman would have to retire, or he'd be killed on duty. Fearing a world without someone like Batman, she decided to create a new one.

Waller, with old connections to Project Cadmus, gathered the technology necessary for her movement, codenamed "Project Batman Beyond." Bruce's DNA was obtained in Gotham City, where his arm got grazed after intercepting a gang war—a small blood sample on a piece of gauze left at the scene of it. Years later, in Neo Gotham, after Bruce retired, she found a couple that was psychologically identical to his parents. Warren McGinnis was called in to get a routine flu shot that actually was a nanotech solution to replace the DNA in his reproductive system with that of Bruce Wayne's, turning Warren into Bruce's surrogate. A year later, Mary McGinnis gave birth to Terry, who was biologically a child of her and Bruce.

Waller executed the final phase of her plan when Terry was eight years old: hiring an assassin — Andrea Beaumont, Bruce Wayne's former fiancée and the enigmatic Phantasm — to kill Terry's parents so that the trauma of seeing his parents murdered in front of him might motivate Terry to someday become a hero equivalent to Batman, during which Mary was again pregnant. However, Beaumont stalled at the last minute and realized that murdering in Batman's name would dishonor his legacy. Reluctantly realizing that Beaumont was right, Waller cancelled the project, resulting in Terry's brother (and potential successor) Matt being born later: it is implied that these events were what caused Terry's parents' later separation after Warren discovered that the children were not his and accused Mary of infidelity. Nevertheless, eight years later, by chance, Terry's father was murdered, and the young teen encountered Bruce, sealing Terry's fate forever. Waller's admission of guilt and affirmation of Terry's destiny allowed him to overcome his anger and bitterness. Terry then decided to propose to his longtime girlfriend, Dana, and fully accepts his role as Batman. Knowing that Bruce is innocent and believing that he is also oblivious of their relation, as Terry was, Terry decides not to tell Bruce of what he discovered but privately acknowledges him as his father alongside Warren, who was still his father via surrogacy.

According to episode co-writer Dwayne McDuffie, Bruce, as a master detective, despite having no involvement with Waller's plan, becomes aware that Terry and Matt are his genetic offspring at some point after Terry assumes the role of Batman as he has been treating Terry's injuries by then, and figures out the machinations of Waller and Project Cadmus because they are the only people with such means; however, he never brings it up out of respect for Warren McGinnis, including avoiding confronting Waller about it, and because he wants Terry to be his own man: in the comics, he slowly comes to accept and love both Terry and Matt as his sons privately.

This project was used in the Batman Beyond original comic book miniseries, with the Beyond version of Hush being a twisted clone of Dick Grayson, created after the original Grayson was badly injured in a fight; Waller had reasoned that a clone of Grayson would be easier to control than one of Bruce, but the new Grayson went insane, killing most of Batman's survived-but-retired villains and nearly triggering a new earthquake before he was defeated by Terry, the original Grayson, and the new Catwoman.

=== DC Main Universe ===
The Batman Beyond concept became DC Comics canon in the pages of Superman/Batman issues 22 and 23, wherein Bizarro is transported to an alternate reality somewhere in Hypertime, which resembled the Batman Beyond-era Gotham City, with Batman Beyond in action with the 1999 animated black-and-red costume and the 1992 Batplane from the original animated series. This version of the character is in radio contact with Bruce Wayne, but was referred to as "Tim". The Batman Beyond cameo was enough to garner a DC Direct action figure, the character's first in years, listed as "Tim Drake".

Also, in Countdown to Final Crisis, former Robin Jason Todd, former Wonder Girl Donna Troy, Green Lantern Kyle Rayner, and Bob the Monitor travel to "Earth-12," which resembles the DCAU's future. They witness from the rooftops someone in a Batman Beyond costume defeating members of the Jokerz gang (although they do not know who is under the mask of the future Batman), to which Jason Todd says, "Huh. The more things change, the more they stay the same." The group speculates that either Tim Drake or Dick Grayson is under the mask. However, The Monitor confirms it is indeed McGinnis.

Dan DiDio announced in a July 2009 questions segment with Newsarama that Terry McGinnis would be appearing within DC Comics again in the future.

The Batman Beyond miniseries began its run on June 16, 2010, set in 2039 Neo-Gotham, revolving around the assassination of anyone who had anything to do with Bruce Wayne's Batman, foe or friend. Dan DiDio stated that this "Terry McGinnis mini-series" is in response to the interest expressed by the "fans of the character." It was penned by Adam Beechen, a non-DCAU Batman television writer. According to Beechen before the comic was completed, the comic book arc as to open the door for the "legendary" DCAU to enter into the mainstream DC Universe (comics), tying into both continuities. The series took place after McGinnis defeated the reborn Joker and picked up where Bruce Timm initially left off, but years before Terry learns that Bruce Wayne is his biological father.

In 2010, Terry appeared alongside Superman in the oversized issue Superman/Batman Annual 2010, which picks up after their first meeting together taking place in the DCAU, and also jibing with the DCU.

Terry became officially part of the DCU canon in 2010 debuting in Batman #700 by Grant Morrison as a baby.

On October 6, 2010, it was announced at New York Comic-Con that Batman Beyond would start as an ongoing series in January 2011. The series ended with only eight issues in August. However, a new series, Batman Beyond Unlimited, served as a return to the Beyond universe. The title features Superman Beyond, Justice League Beyond, and Batman Beyond, starring McGinnis.

Terry McGinnis officially entered mainstream DC continuity in the 2014 New 52 maxiseries, The New 52: Futures End.

== Relationships ==
=== Bruce Wayne ===
Despite his role as the second Batman, Terry leads a very different, far less privileged life than Bruce. In addition to coping with his father's death, Terry struggles to keep his double life secret from his mother and younger brother. Because of his responsibilities as Batman and personal assistant to Bruce, he is not afforded the same licenses the Robins enjoyed and is expected to be on the call whenever he is needed. As a result, Terry is just barely successful at balancing out his dual life, on several occasions prompting both men to reconsider Terry's reliability. This is evidenced by him being perpetually sleepy during the day, struggling to stay awake for school or to have time for his family and girlfriend, who gets frustrated with his constant "leaving" their dates early to the point of multiple break-ups.

Terry and Bruce develop unspoken respect for each other, with Terry regarding Bruce as a surrogate father, not knowing his biological connection to Bruce at first. This is demonstrated in the episode "Sneak Peek" where Terry pays reporter Ian Peek a visit to plead on Bruce's behalf.

Even though the stern attitude of Bruce with Terry is meant to ensure that he pushes Terry both emotionally and physically, and even though Bruce can at times be very emotionally distant to the young Batman, there are occasions where he also shows genuine concern and love for Terry. In one instance he defended Terry to Commissioner Barbara Gordon when Shriek held Gotham hostage in exchange for Batman's life.

In the Justice League Unlimited episode "The Once and The Future Thing: Time Warped", set in an altered timeline by Chronos, Bruce is shocked and saddened after Terry is killed by the Jokerz.

In turn, Bruce initially treats Terry the same way he treated his wards Dick Grayson and Tim Drake. In time, Terry grows into the cowl, and Bruce grows to accept him as his heir to the Batman legacy, demonstrating a great deal of faith in him despite his criminal past; in the episode "Eyewitness", when Spellbinder framed Terry for murder, Bruce trusted Terry's claims of innocence even after Barbara Gordon told Bruce that she had seen Terry kill a man. Over time, the generally private Bruce Wayne even told Terry about some of his old enemies and adventures as Batman, such as his old relationship with Selina Kyle, with Terry also doing his independent research into individuals such as Talia al Ghul, although Bruce never discussed the Joker due to the intensely personal nature of his confrontations with the villain and the traumatic final fight they had. Because of their relationship, Terry occasionally brings out Bruce's sense of humor.

The twist about Bruce and Terry's hidden genetic relationship to each other seems to be foreshadowed in a number of episodes: at the end of "The Call", Superman implied he knew of Terry's true heritage.

=== Family members ===
Terry values his mother, Mary McGinnis, and his younger brother, Matt, are the closest family he has left. At the time of his death, Warren McGinnis was divorced from his wife and their sons split between them; Terry with his father, Matt with his mother. After the divorce, Terry's relationship with his father is shown in the episode "Rebirth" to be strained. The last time they spoke Terry and his father had a heated argument, something Terry is never completely able to forgive himself for (despite years later discovering Warren was not his biological father). Like Thomas Wayne, Warren's death inspired Terry to fight crime as Batman. After Warren's death, Terry moves back in with his mother and brother.

Even though there exists an obligatory spark of sibling rivalry and tough love between himself and Matt, Terry would be there to raise his brother's spirits when he was feeling down, notably in the episode "Revenant" when Matt reminisces about their father. The Justice League Unlimited episode "Epilogue" shows that an eight-year-old Terry bears a strong resemblance to Matt, indicating that Matt, like Terry, is also Bruce Wayne's son genetically. Matt is also an obsessive Batman fan, which is ironic considering that he never realizes his brother and the hero he idolizes are the same and is oblivious of his biological relationship to the original Dark Knight.

As far as Mary and Matt are concerned, Terry is simply employed by Bruce Wayne to run errands during the series, finding the idea of Terry being Batman to be absurd, ridiculing him when he once attempts to reveal his secret in the episode "Sneak Peek".

In the Justice League Unlimited episode "Epilogue", Terry tells Bruce Wayne that he never once doubted that Warren McGinnis loved him with all his heart, and would have taught Terry right from wrong if the young man had been willing to listen.

In September 2011, The New 52 rebooted DC's continuity. In this new timeline, Matt McGinnis is aware of his brother's secret identity after Terry revealed it to him when he rescued Matt from a crumbling bridge. He becomes more active in assisting both Tim and Terry when they take on the mantle of Batman and possibly hopes to inherit the mantle himself one day. However, in Rebirth, Matt became the new Robin instead inspired by Damian Wayne. Their mother is also deceased as a result of Futures End.

=== Friends and colleagues ===
==== Max Gibson ====
Maxine "Max" Gibson, a classmate of Terry's and later one of his closest friends, is an African American girl with short dyed pink hair who attends Hamilton Hill High School with Terry. Her parents are separated, and she has one older sister who often works late hours. Max is exceptionally intelligent and talented with computer programming, even among her peers. She initially suspects Terry of being the leader of the Jokerz, but after the real leader's identity is exposed she deduces Batman's secret identity and becomes his unofficial sidekick; while Bruce and Terry both refuse to let her take on a Robin-esque role, Terry jokingly calls Max his "Alfred".

==== Dana Tan ====
Terry flirted with several girls throughout the show, but his main love interest has always been Dana Tan, his Chinese-American long-time girlfriend. In the episode "Big Time", she recognizes Charlie "Big Time" Bigelow by sight, suggesting that Dana and Terry knew each other since their early teens, although in "Rebirth", Terry's mother notes that Dana, Terry's "friend", left him her number, suggesting that they became a couple over the course of the series. Despite their commitment to each other, their relationship is strained as Terry struggles early on as Batman to balance his dual obligations. The two have been on the verge of breaking up several times, especially before Terry meets Melanie Walker, AKA Ten of the Royal Flush Gang, but despite being close to breaking up several times over, Dana manages to forgive Terry for his absences, believing that Terry sees Bruce Wayne as a father-figure and doesn't want to fail him. The two are usually shown together many times through the series, including the film Batman Beyond: Return of the Joker.

However, as the Justice League Unlimited episode "Epilogue" reveals, Terry ultimately grows into full acceptance of his role as Batman, and somewhere along the line discloses his secret to Dana. Despite knowing his secret, Dana shows to have accepted his double life and is willing to be with him, even if her safety is threatened. She is also frustrated with the fact that they have been dating for years and have not married. Although it takes him some time to get over his fears for her safety in the event that his identity is ever compromised, the episode ends with Terry planning to propose to her.

In the comics, it was revealed that Dana had a brother named Doug who led an assault on Gotham as the leader of the Jokerz. Dana requests Terry and Bruce's help in finding him, but Doug manages to kill thousands of people by sending a large group of Jokerz as suicide bombers around the city. Doug confronts Dana and her family in the hospital (after he fractured their father's skull), but before Doug can kill them, Bruce manages to call Batman in to save the Tans, eventually resulting in Doug's death. Batman's rescue led Dana to figure out that Terry was Batman and what his connection to Bruce was. Bruce and Terry trusted Dana enough to keep the secret, and Dana's family agrees to implant Bruce with Doug's liver to save Bruce from dying of liver failure.

==== Melanie Walker/Ten ====
In the midst of a spat with Dana, Terry meets Melanie Walker and the two become extremely attracted to one another instantly; however, Terry is crushed when he learns she too leads a double life: as Ten, the youngest member of the latest incarnation of the Royal Flush Gang. He discards a note Melanie had left him without reading it, choosing to be with Dana instead in his anger due to the betrayal, leaving Melanie apparently oblivious that her enemy and love interest are the same person.

Terry has additional encounters with Ten and the Royal Flush Gang; each time, he advises her to turn straight, showing that he still cares deeply about her. Their relationship is somewhat reminiscent of the one the original Batman had with Catwoman, and Bruce even notes it. Melanie is later shown to have gone straight and has abandoned the life of a criminal for a normal one.

In a comic book series based from the continuity of the animated series, Melanie is now enrolled in Terry and Dana's college, continuing the love triangle between them. After Batman and Ten stop Inque and Queen from stealing Two-Face's coin, Terry accuses Melanie of stealing the coin, leading the two to break up as Melanie accepts that she can never get Terry to trust her again no matter what she does.

In the 2016 DC Rebirth series of Batman Beyond, Melanie, at that time under rehab supervision by Jack Ryder, burgles Wayne Manor for a picture of Terry, who had moved there with Matt after his mother's death. She later helps Terry against Dr. Stanton, who assumed his son Kenny's identity as Payback, and then against a new Scarecrow. In the course of the latter fight, Terry is forced to unmask himself to calm his mind-controlled brother, thus revealing his secret identity to Melanie, and she is subsequently introduced to the Bat Family.

==== Commissioner Barbara Gordon ====
Terry upholds tradition by forging an alliance with Gotham City's police commissioner, Barbara Gordon, formerly Batgirl/Oracle and the daughter of Jim Gordon. The alliance starts out on an uneasy and sour note, as Barbara never fails to take Terry's juvenile record into account and believes he is too reckless for the role of Batman. The fact that Terry occasionally ruins police stakeout operations by intervening without fully assessing the situation sometimes worsens their relationship. In addition to this, Barbara, actually the last of the Bat-Family to retire from vigilantism, revealed she and Bruce were romantically involved at one point after her ex-boyfriend Dick Grayson left Gotham, but his unwavering focus on his mission strained their relationship and put it to an end, thus having a new Batman appears to have opened up old wounds for her.

Barbara is reluctant to assist the new Batman and to have a teenager as Gotham's new protector and sternly warns him to stay away from police matters. The film Batman Beyond: Return of the Joker revealed that Barbara remains haunted by the torture that Tim Drake long ago suffered at the hands of the Joker. She advises Terry to give up being Batman, and once tries to arrest him after he is framed for murder by Spellbinder; however, when the truth comes out, Barbara rewards Terry with a civic service award as an apology. Barbara eventually relents, however, upon realizing that she could not deter him any more than she could have been deterred from being Batgirl.

Barbara eventually warms up to Terry, assisting him when Bruce is put out of action by a revived Joker. She states that she hopes Terry would avoid the lonely existence that Bruce leads. However, Barbara's attitude is different from Jim Gordon's, and she notes once that she is "not [her] father", never working as closely with Terry as her father did with Bruce.

In the comics, Barbara works closer with Terry than in the animated series and gives him the necessary information about the criminals they face. She even gives him the opportunity to take the villains down before calling in for police support. She becomes more involved when Terry starts working with her former lover, Dick Grayson. At one point, she and Dick tell Terry that her relationship with Bruce went to shambles because Barbara was seeing both at the same time, while keeping her affair with Bruce secret from Dick. Eventually, this reached the breaking point when Barbara became pregnant from Bruce, who then decided to tell Dick without gaining her consent. Because Barbara would not relent from crimefighting, she suffered a miscarriage, all of which resulted in the bitter end of her participation as a member of the Bat-Family.

In 2011's New 52 reboot of the series, Barbara is slightly younger than she was in the animated series (still retaining her red hair) and isn't hesitant to work with Terry likely due to the extreme circumstances the world was put in thanks to Futures End. When Terry was presumed dead and Tim Drake was Batman, her role as the tech expert was similar to Bruce's role to Terry's Batman.

==== Dick Grayson ====
Though Terry never met Batman's former sidekick that was Robin and Nightwing in the animated series, the two did get the chance to meet in the tie-in comic. They work together to bring down Hush (who was a failed clone of Grayson), and Dick helped Terry with handling the Jokerz bombing Gotham and Undercloud. Though Dick was uninvolved in the superhero community for quite some time after losing his eye during a fight between Batman and the Joker, Terry has inspired him to return to the spotlight. When a GCPD detective outs Dick as Nightwing to the public, Terry and Max try to make the public think otherwise by having Terry interrogate the detective as a disguised, older Nightwing while Max plants alibis on the internet. Dick admits the truth to the public without jeopardizing his allies' secrets.

After learning how Bruce impacted Dick and Barbara's romance, Terry loses trust in Bruce and chooses Dick to be his new mentor. Terry finds working with Dick easier than Bruce, because unlike the latter Dick reminds Terry of his commitment to his family and to his education.

Terry also managed to convince the Justice Lord counterpart of Dick to aid him in battling Lord Superman. After Lord Superman is defeated, Dick and Terry's counterpart are inspired by Terry to continue Bruce's legacy and begin their version of Batman Beyond. Dick becomes T's mentor for fighting criminals.

==== Tim Drake ====
After Bruce is attacked by a reborn Joker, who had returned through mysterious means and left for dead in the Batcave and Terry himself by the Joker's Jokerz while he was hanging out with his girlfriend. Terry becomes increasingly suspicious and after pressing Commissioner Barbara Gordon, learns of Tim's tragic past as to how and why he was forced to give up being the second Robin following his kidnapping, torture and psychotic break at the hands of the original Joker and being turned into a miniature version of him. Terry later learns that Tim is the new Joker, albeit unknowingly: prior to his death, the original Joker implanted a microchip containing his DNA and consciousness onto Tim. Terry ultimately defeats the new Joker and frees Tim from the programming. Terry then visits Tim in the hospital as the latter is recovering and gains respect and gratitude from him for saving his life; Tim acknowledges Terry to be worthy of the Batman mantle.

==== T ====
T is Terry's counterpart in the Justice Lords timeline. In this timeline, Terry became estranged from his parents and became a member of the Jokerz. He was also dating the Justice Lord counterpart of Melanie, who was also part of the Jokerz.

When Terry arrives in his reality in the Justice Lords Beyond story arc, he is disgusted by T's personality and actions as a Joker. He's also upset that T is distant from his parents and doesn't take advantage of his dad being alive in this reality. In the event, Terry's near-sacrifice at the hands of Lord Superman and courage convince T to turn his life around. T and this reality's Dick Grayson assist Terry in escaping and taking on Lord Superman. When Lord Superman is defeated, T gives Terry the chance to talk to his father in return for his actions. T and Dick are inspired by Terry to continue Batman's legacy and he becomes this reality's version of Batman.

Terry makes frequent visits to monitor T's progression as a hero and becomes increasingly impressed with his progress. He also takes the time to make visits with T's father. When Rewire blackmails Batman into giving him access to the Justice Lords timeline, Bruce destroys the portal.

==== Charlie Bigelow ====
Charlie "Big Time" Bigelow is a con artist who dragged Terry into a life of crime. In the episode "Big Time", Terry reveals his background with Charlie to Max, explaining that the same felony which landed him in prison for three months had Charlie put away for three years. Guilt-ridden, Terry would e-mail Charlie periodically while he was in prison. When Charlie is finally released, Terry convinces Bruce to give him a job at Wayne-Powers. This turns out to be a ploy by Charlie to aid in a corporate espionage scheme, during which Charlie is exposed to an experimental growth compound and mutated into a monstrous form.

Despite Terry's friendship with Charlie and the regret that his time in jail did not reform him, subsequent events in the episode "Betrayal" make clear that Charlie saw Terry merely as hired muscle, and thus he does not care of ruining lives such as Terry's for his own selfish ends. Terry finally lets go of his guilt toward Charlie and sees him for the threat and enemy he really is.

=== With other superheroes ===
Terry grew up admiring other superheroes of his day, the Justice League Unlimited. Eventually, he is recruited by Superman to root out a traitor in the team, which turns out to be Superman himself, under the control of the extraterrestrial creature Starro. Though the rest of the team at first distrusts him due to his perceived inexperience, Terry gains their trust by saving their lives and freeing Superman from the alien's mind control. However, he says that he would prefer to be like his mentor and only partially serve on the Justice League.

When Static is sent 40 years into the future from the time of the Static Shock series, he is forced to work with Terry to rescue Static's future self from Kobra. While Terry doubts his abilities at first, he eventually develops respect for him.

Terry seems to have rejoined, as later episodes of Justice League Unlimited show him as a regular member. In the JLU episode "The Once and Future Thing, Part 2: Time Warped", Terry fights alongside Static (of that era) and Warhawk, with Bruce being the tactical leader, along with the time traveling members from the past, including Bruce's counterpart as Batman. He is killed in the episode, though his death is undone by the original Batman's actions. The encounter between the succeeding and the original Batman has slightly altered the future, since the elderly Bruce mentioned that he had no memory of meeting the former during time travel during his tenure as Batman before the timeline's alteration, as the latter became aware that he would have a successor. However, the original Batman still not knowing about Terry and how they would meet, because Terry was masked, and the original Batman had avoided learning details about his future, thereby preserving much of the Batman Beyond continuity but with one exception that Bruce would anticipate meeting and train this successor after he retired in the new timeline evidently in the episode "Epilogue".

== Powers, abilities, and equipment ==
Even before receiving training from Bruce, Terry appeared to be at least a well-able street fighter. In the pilot episode "Rebirth", he can fend off several Jokerz without aid, and appears to have been a member of his high school's wrestling team before being kicked out because he feuded with obnoxious teammate Nelson Nash. As expected of Batman, he engages in regular, rigorous training to minimize his reliance on the Batsuit: under Bruce's tutelage, Terry has honed his body to at least Olympic levels.

Terry has engaged in combat outside of the Batsuit in various instances. His training has granted him exceptional reflexes, enabling him to evade gunfire and make impressive leaping attempts, whether in or out of the Batsuit. In one instance, without the suit's aid, Terry survives a fall from several stories high by bouncing off a pillar that is about to crush him and lands on his feet. Terry even defeats his suit in single combat when it is controlled by the computerized consciousness of a deceased business mogul, armed only with the equipment in Bruce's vintage utility belt. Fifteen years after the last episode of Batman Beyond, as Terry reaches his thirties, he can get through Amanda Waller's security systems and overpower her guards without the aid of his suit, suggesting that his skills are paralleling Bruce's when he was in his prime.

In "Epilogue", Waller comments that Terry has inherited several of Bruce's qualities: he possesses a high intellect (though Waller notes that Bruce is still the brighter of the pair) and has grown into Bruce's physical stature and build, having been significantly leaner than Bruce was as Batman during the series. Terry tends to rely on Bruce for the intellectual details when in the field, but he has received an amount of detective training from Bruce, allowing him to perform such feats as tracking down Shriek or determining a link between Joker and Tim Drake when Bruce was incapacitated, proving that he is skilled if not a master detective like Bruce. After reaching adulthood, it appears that Terry has become an expert detective that even Superman would contact him for consultations instead of Bruce, who has completely retired from superheroics and only provides Terry fatherly support like Alfred Pennyworth.

As Batman, Terry emulates Bruce's deep, harsh tone. He does this of his own accord, to separate the entities of Terry and Batman (Terry can be heard using his "Batman voice" outside of the Batsuit in the episodes "Shriek" and "Future Shock"). Will Friedle has stated that he believes Terry's "Batman voice" is not just to strike terror into the hearts of criminals, but also to conceal his adolescence.

Though Bruce had taunt opponents when he was Batman, Terry, however, being a wisecracker, is far more talkative than his predecessor (reflecting Friedle's background as a comedic actor): on one occasion, he was able to put the revived Joker off-balance to the point of blind fury and proves that he is a worthy opponent to the Clown Prince. Terry is also capable of using a rather convincing Brooklyn accent when undercover. Terry is a skilled motorcyclist, seen hijacking a Jokerz motorcycle in "Rebirth" and subsequently using it for his own throughout the series, and has also demonstrated considerable skill in handling a flight-capable Batmobile.

=== Terry McGinnis' Batsuit ===
The Batsuit worn by Terry is the last incarnation created by Bruce before his retirement. It possesses retractable glider wings under the arms and jet thrusters in the boot heels, a built-in rebreather, and a two-way audio-visual link with the Batcomputer, allowing Terry to keep in contact with Bruce for superior tactical planning. Additionally, the suit includes active camouflage and has various built-in gadgets.

=== Prototype Batsuit ===
In the later comics, when Terry's suit was heavily damaged, Bruce gave him a spare prototype Batsuit to join the Justice League on a mission. The most notable feature was a cape, and while the suit gave him identical physical abilities, its sensors and communication capabilities were less advanced.

=== Lord Batman's Synthetic Kryptonite Batsuit ===
While on a mission into the parallel universe where the Justice Lords reside, Terry found an alternate version of his Batsuit (hidden in the compartment where Bruce kept the prototype suit) built by Lord Batman before his death to counter Lord Superman's powers and abilities, the extra enhancements included force fields, holographic projections, and it featured synthetic kryptonite as a weapon. After defeating Lord Superman, he and Dick Grayson started upgrading his own suit with the enhancements. The upgrades include a new pair of wings on Terry's Batsuit to help him gain better capability in flight, but Bruce rejects the new wings.

=== The Bat Armor ===
Seen only twice in the series, the Bat Armor is donned by Bruce in an encounter with Inque, who had kidnapped Terry and was holding him hostage. It is a retractable powered exoskeleton composed of heavy plate armor that enhances the survivability of the wearer, boosting their physical strength and resilience to superhuman levels greater than that of the Batsuit. When retracted, Bruce was able to wear a trench coat over it and not look like he had any considerable increase in body mass, although activating the armor shredded the trench coat in the process.

Bruce created the Bat Armor years earlier in light of his increasing heart problems as a possible replacement for the Batsuit; however, during testing, using the armor nearly gave him a heart attack and he was forced to abandon that option. Understandably, Bruce only uses the Bat Armor in dire circumstances.

== Other versions ==
An alternate version of Terry appears in the 2022-2023 miniseries Batman: Beyond the White Knight. In this continuity, Terry is the 17-year-old son of Warren and Miyako McGinnis, having already gained a criminal record in his youth. 12 years after Bruce Wayne had been imprisoned for his actions as Batman, Terry hunts down Mr. Fixx for killing his father and gets arrested, but released to Derek Powers, who tells Terry that he will help him find whoever killed Warren. Terry is assigned to steal the Beyond Batsuit from the ruins of the Batcave, then hunts down Bruce on Powers' orders, believing him to have ordered the murder. Bruce escapes with the intervention of Duke Thomas but is injured, while Terry confronts Powers on how Bruce knows they are working together; leading Powers to show Terry "the Project"; a massive an army of mech-suits built using items Terry stole as Batman as a basis, and classified video of Superman to convince Terry to continue working for him on the pretense of an "invasion." However, remembering how his father told him that Powers needed to be stopped before his death, Terry goes off to the Wayne-Powers building. There, he tries explaining to Bruce that he wanted answers and not to hurt him before being interrupted by Powers. Wayne reveals that he knows Powers murdered Warren McGinnis and that he knew Terry was wearing the suit, causing Terry to become enraged and start destroying the facility, which results in Powers becoming doused in a substance turning him into Blight, while Terry steals a flash drive Bruce had dropped. After reviewing it, Terry stops Powers from attacking the Batmobile (which had Bruce and an injured Dick Grayson inside), fighting him until the suit is hacked and he is sent to attack the fleeing Batmobile, before tearfully fighting Bruce against his will, nearly killing him before being stopped by Bat-family members, and the suit programming overrides with the help of an AI copy of Jack Napier. Terry is allowed to keep the suit by Bruce as the Bat-family and GCPD launch an assault on Wayne-Powers. While freeing Jack/Joker's daughter Jackie from imprisonment, Terry faces Powers again, using trickery to disable the device to control the suit, but refuses to kill Powers, instead locking him in a regeneration chamber. Terry is later seen talking to Bruce and Barbara Gordon.

== In other media ==
=== DCAU tie-in comics ===
In addition to having his own comic book, Terry McGinnis appeared in Superman Adventures #64, chasing a futuristic version of Brainiac.

=== Film ===
- Terry McGinnis / Batman appears in Justice League: Crisis on Infinite Earths, voiced again by Will Friedle.
- Terry McGinnis / Batman appears in the 2024 fan film Batman Beyond: Year One, portrayed by Ryan Potter.

=== Television ===
- Terry McGinnis makes guest appearances in The Zeta Project, Static Shock, and Justice League Unlimited.
- Terry McGinnis / Batman makes a non-speaking cameo appearance in the Batman: The Brave and the Bold episode "Night of the Batmen!".
- Terry McGinnis / Batman appears in a special episode of DC Nation Shorts created for Batman's 75th anniversary.
- Terry McGinnis / Batman makes non-speaking cameo appearances in the Teen Titans Go! episodes "Sandwich Thief" and "Huggbees".
- Terry McGinnis / Batman appears in the Robot Chicken episode "May Cause One Year of Orange Poop".

=== Video games ===
- Terry McGinnis / Batman appears in the Batman Beyond: Return of the Joker tie-in game.
- Terry McGinnis / Batman appears as a skin for Batman in the Batman: Arkham and Injustice series.
- Terry McGinnis appears as a playable DLC character in Lego Batman 3: Beyond Gotham, voiced by Troy Baker.
- Terry McGinnis / Batman appears as a character summon in Scribblenauts Unmasked: A DC Comics Adventure.
- Terry McGinnis / Batman appears as a playable skin in the online multiplayer game Fortnite.
- Terry McGinnis / Batman appears as a useable figure in the Teen Titans Go! tie in game Teen Titans Go Figure!

== See also ==
- Batman Beyond
- Batman Beyond: Return of the Joker
- Batman Beyond (comics)
