= Batman Beyond =

American animated television series (1999-2001)

- Also known as: Batman of the Future
- Genre: Superhero; Cyberpunk
- Created by: Paul Dini; Bruce Timm; Alan Burnett
- Based on: Batman by: Bob Kane; Bill Finger (uncredited)
- Showrunner: Bruce Timm
- Written by: Alan Burnett; Paul Dini; Stan Berkowitz; Rich Fogel; Hilary Bader
- Voices of: Will Friedle; Kevin Conroy; Cree Summer; Lauren Tom; Stockard Channing; Angie Harmon
- Composers: Shirley Walker; Lolita Ritmanis; Michael McCuistion; Kristopher Carter
- Country of origin: United States
- Original language: English
- No. of seasons: 3
- No. of episodes: 52 (list of episodes)

Production
- Executive producer: Jean MacCurdy
- Producers: Alan Burnett; Paul Dini; Glen Murakami; Bruce Timm
- Running time: 21–22 minutes
- Production companies: Warner Bros. Family Entertainment; Warner Bros. Television Animation

Original release
- Network: Kids' WB (Note: Episodes 1–2 pilot aired on The WB and episode 47 aired on Cartoon Network)
- Release: January 10, 1999 – December 18, 2001

Related
- The New Batman Adventures; The Batman (TV series); The Zeta Project; DC Animated Universe television series

Batman Beyond (also known as Batman of the Future in some territories) is an American animated cyberpunk superhero television series based on the DC Comics superhero Batman, and serving as the sequel to both Batman: The Animated Series and The New Batman Adventures. Created and developed by Paul Dini, Bruce Timm, and Alan Burnett and produced by Warner Bros. Television Animation, the series began airing on January 10, 1999 on The WB's Sunday Night lineup as a two-part pilot.

The series follows the exploits of teenager Terry McGinnis, who becomes the new Batman for the city of Gotham in the near future. Terry is aided and mentored by the retired Batman, Bruce Wayne, as he faces a variety of criminals including several new supervillains. Despite being conceived as a kid-friendly Batman series by Warner Bros. Animation, it ended up being darker than its predecessor Batman: The Animated Series, yet went on to receive critical acclaim and gained a cult following.

Batman Beyond ran for three seasons, concluding with a direct-to-video film, Batman Beyond: Return of the Joker. The decision to end production on the series came due to Warner Bros. Animation opting to favor pushing forward production for the Justice League animated series, though with Batman Beyond featuring crossovers with additional shows in the DC Animated Universe.

== Plot ==
In the then-future year of 2019, Bruce Wayne is in his sixties and still fighting crime as Batman, despite suffering recurring health issues relating to his age and past injuries. During a rescue of a kidnapped heiress, Bruce suffers a heart attack and, at the risk of being killed by a criminal, betrays his cardinal rule by threatening him with a gun, the weapon used to murder his parents and motivate him to become Batman in the first place. Realizing that he will inevitably have to break his strict code to never kill for survival if he continues to fight crime, Bruce reluctantly decides to permanently retire from crime fighting to avoid becoming a killer. By this point, his butler and confidant, Alfred Pennyworth, and additional colleagues, such as Lucius Fox and James Gordon, have since died of natural causes while his partners, Dick Grayson, Barbara Gordon and Tim Drake are still alive and have moved on after retiring from their crime-fighting duties as Nightwing, Batgirl and Robin, respectively. All of his rogues' gallery, if not still incarcerated or residing at Arkham Asylum, are either reformed members of society, missing or in exile, or dead. Bruce has also severed ties with Superman and the Justice League. After being ousted from leadership of Wayne Enterprises, Bruce Wayne lost his family legacy to a corporate takeover by Powers Technology, resulting in the birth of Wayne-Powers under the ruthless control of Derek Powers.

Twenty years later, Bruce lives alone in Wayne Manor with only the company of his Great Dane, Ace. One night, rebellious teenager Terry McGinnis is chased by thugs onto the lawn of Wayne Manor, and he and Bruce fight them together, but Bruce has another heart attack shortly afterwards. Terry takes Bruce inside and takes care of him. Exploring the mansion, Terry discovers the Batcave and asks Bruce to let him take up his mantle.

Terry's decision to become Batman stems from sharing a similar origin story to Bruce, in that his father, Warren McGinnis, is murdered after learning of an illegal weapons project being conducted at Wayne-Powers. Bruce grants Terry a high-tech Batsuit he made shortly before and used up until his retirement, granting him increased strength and agility, flight capabilities, stealth, and enhanced sensor systems, with Bruce allowing him to use it not only to get justice for his father's murder, but also to prevent the illegal weapon being manufactured being sold to a foreign power. His actions lead to Bruce accepting him as the new Batman and providing him cover for his work under the pretense of Terry doing part-time work for him outside of school hours. Despite the two having moments where they differ in methods they also gain respect for each other's work as Batman.

Terry mainly lives with his remaining family—his mother, Mary, who was divorced from Warren around the time of his death; and his brother, Matt—while dating fellow student Dana Tan, though his life as Batman creates complications to their relationship. Alongside Bruce, Terry is aided in his life by Max Gibson, a close friend and highly intelligent student who uncovers his secret several weeks after he becomes Batman, serving in a role similar to Alfred Pennyworth. Apart from Max, Terry's role as Batman is also known to Barbara Gordon, who aided Bruce as Batgirl before parting ways with him to become the Gotham City Police Department's police commissioner following her father's death. While initially at odds with Terry—and less tolerant of him compared to her father, who greatly trusted Bruce during his time as Batman—due to his young age, perceived recklessness, and an old grudge towards Bruce for his cold behaviour towards her and his other partners during his time as Batman, she develops a begrudging respect towards him, even allowing him to assist her when needed. Like Bruce, Terry develops his own rogues' gallery amongst the criminals he brings to justice, and also faces some of Bruce's own surviving enemies.

== Characters ==
=== Main characters ===
- Terry McGinnis / Batman (voiced by Will Friedle) is the current Batman and a former juvenile delinquent. Under the pretense of doing errands for Bruce, Terry fights crime as the new Batman. In Justice League Unlimited, he discovers that he is genetically Bruce Wayne's son and was meant to be his successor as Batman.
- Bruce Wayne (voiced by Kevin Conroy) is the original Batman and Terry's mentor and armourer. During his final mission as Batman, Bruce suffered a heart attack that forced him to use a gun in self-defense. Abhorred by this, he hung up his cape and cowl. At some point, Wayne Enterprises merged with Powers Technology, with Derek Powers becoming CEO. When Terry becomes the new Batman, Bruce monitors his activities from the Batcave. Following the presumed death of Derek Powers and the arrest of Paxton Powers, Bruce retakes control of Wayne Enterprises.
- Maxine "Max" Gibson (voiced by Cree Summer) is a genius high schooler and friend of Terry's. She discovers his secret identity early on in the series, and from then on occasionally helps Batman in an Alfred-like role.
- Ace (vocal effects provided by writer Robert Goodman's dog) is Bruce Wayne's pet Great Dane, who was formerly a stray before Bruce encountered and adopted him. Fiercely loyal to Bruce and distrustful of Terry at first, he eventually develops an improving bond with Terry as the series progresses.

=== Terry's family ===
- Warren McGinnis (voiced by Michael Gross) is Terry's father. Warren worked as a research scientist at Wayne-Powers. When Warren and his wife got a divorce, he gained custody of Terry. Warren is killed by Mr. Fixx at the start of the series.
- Mary McGinnis (voiced by Teri Garr) is the mother of Terry and the ex-wife of Warren. She works as an astronomer at Astro-Tech. After Warren is killed by Mr. Fixx, Terry moves in with his mother.
- Matt McGinnis (voiced by Ryan O'Donohue) is Terry's younger brother. Always looking to get his brother in trouble, Matt is ironically a big fan of Batman.

=== Recurring characters ===
- Dana Tan (voiced by Lauren Tom) is Terry's girlfriend. She is Chinese American and had a hard time accepting his responsibilities as Bruce Wayne's employee initially, but became more understanding regarding his frequent absences.
- Barbara Gordon (voiced by Stockard Channing in season 1, Angie Harmon in seasons 2 and 3 and Batman Beyond: Return of the Joker, Tara Strong as the young Barbara Gordon/Batgirl in Return of the Joker) is the police commissioner of Gotham and the former Batgirl. She is the daughter of former police commissioner James Gordon and assumed the position following his death.
- Melanie Walker / Ten (voiced by Olivia d'Abo) is a member of the Royal Flush Gang and an on-off love interest of Terry.
- Sam Young (voiced by Paul Winfield) is a Gotham district attorney and Barbara's husband.
- Howard Groote (voiced by Max Brooks) is a nerdy student at Hamilton Hill High School.
- Bobbi "Blade" Sommer (voiced by Melissa Disney) is the most popular girl at Terry's school. She is portrayed as being stereotypically shallow and manipulative.
- Chelsea Cunningham (voiced by Yvette Lowental in earlier appearances, Rachael Leigh Cook in later appearances) is a Hamilton High student and the former girlfriend of Nelson Nash.
- Nelson Nash (voiced by Seth Green) is an athlete and bully at Terry's school, who eventually matures and becomes more friendly towards him during the series. He seems to be popular with girls, but never has a steady girlfriend.

=== Supporting characters ===
- Justice League Unlimited is the series' incarnation of the Justice League.
  - Superman (voiced by Christopher McDonald) is a founding member of the Justice League and an old friend of Bruce Wayne.
  - Aquagirl (voiced by Jodi Benson) is an Atlantean princess and daughter of Aquaman.
  - Big Barda (voiced by Farrah Forke) is a former member of the Female Furies of Apokolips.
  - Kai-Ro / Green Lantern (voiced by Lauren Tom) is a Tibetan boy and the Green Lantern of Space Sector 2814.
  - Micron (voiced by Wayne Brady) is an African-American superhero similar to Ray Palmer / Atom.
  - Warhawk (voiced by Peter Onorati) is the son of Green Lantern (John Stewart) and Hawkgirl and successor of Hawkman.
- Zeta (voiced by Gary Cole in his first appearance, Diedrich Bader in later appearances) is an android created by the government for infiltration and assassination who becomes a fugitive on the run from the NSA after unexpectedly developing a conscience. He later received a spin-off series, The Zeta Project.
  - Rosalie "Ro" Rowan (voiced by Julie Nathanson) is a teenage runaway who joins Zeta in his quest for freedom.

=== Villains ===
- Derek Powers / Blight (voiced by Sherman Howard) is a megalomaniacal businessman and father of Paxton Powers, whose company Powers Technology merged with Wayne Enterprises years before, around the time of Wayne's retirement as Batman. After accidentally being exposed to an aerosolized viral mutagen he created when Wayne's successor interfered, Powers is treated with radiation, which combines with it to give him a translucent skeletal appearance and radiation-based powers. He is forced to have artificial skin coated over his body to conceal his condition as a stopgap measure while finding a cure.
  - Mr. Fixx (voiced by George Takei) is Derek Powers' right-hand man who killed Warren McGinnis for learning sensitive information about Powers' nerve gas. He is later killed in a crash during his fight with Batman.
  - Dr. Stephanie Lake (voiced by Linda Hamilton) is a Wayne-Powers scientist. She works with Derek Powers to perform cloning experiments with Mr. Freeze.
  - Miss Winston (voiced by Tress MacNeille) is Powers' aid and confidante. She remains his only ally after Paxton exposes his secret.
- Paxton Powers (voiced by Cary Elwes in "Ascension", Parker Stevenson in "King's Ransom") is the estranged son of Derek Powers who takes over his position as CEO of Wayne-Powers after exposing his secret identity. Unlike his father, Paxton neglects his duties as CEO and squanders the company's money for his leisure. Paxton is arrested after his collusion with the Royal Flush Gang is exposed, with Bruce Wayne retaking control of his company.
  - Sable Thorpe (voiced by Gabrielle Carteris) is Paxton Powers' personal assistant, driver, bodyguard, and masseuse. She is revealed to be in a relationship with the King of the Royal Flush Gang. The two conspire to steal Paxton's secret collection of stolen pre-Columbian antiques and eventually elope together.
  - Mr Mendez (voiced by Miguel Sandoval) is a co-conspirator of Paxton, in his plan to overthrow his father. Mendez posed as a protester who crashed the board meeting that angered Powers, to the point that he exposed himself as Blight. He and several others would then later assist Paxton in attempting to kill his father.
- The Jokerz are a violent street gang who dress and act in the tradition of Joker. Unlike the original Joker, they are merely teenage delinquents who enjoy vandalism and petty crime. The Jokerz also appeared in the mainstream comics continuity.
  - J-Man's Jokerz Faction is the first faction of the Jokerz are first seen in the series premiere "Rebirth". They are seen committing petty pranks and harassment before Mr. Fixx frames them for the murder of Warren McGinnis. This branch of the Jokerz has appeared throughout the series since.
    - J-Man (voiced by Bruce Timm) is a member of the Jokerz who closely resembles the original Joker.
    - Dottie (voiced by Lauren Tom in "Rebirth", Pauley Perrette in "Golem", Cree Summer in "Curse of the Kobra") is a member of the Jokerz who wields a spiked rubber chicken.
    - Smirk (voiced by Michael Rosenbaum) is J-Man's "right-hand clown".
    - Coe (voiced by Scott Valentine) is a member of the Jokerz who wears a jester's hat and wields a baseball bat.
    - Spike (voiced by Joe Lala in "Golem", Mark Slaughter in "Bloodsport") is a member of the Jokerz who wields an acid-laced cream pie.
    - Scab (voiced by Marc Worden) is a member of the Jokerz who wields a giant boxing glove on his right hand.
    - Top Hat (voiced by Bruce Timm) is a member of the Jokerz who resembles the Penguin.
    - Lee (voiced by Ethan Embry) is a student at Hamilton Hill High School who dropped out and temporarily joined the Jokerz.
  - Terminal's Jokerz Faction is the second faction of the Jokerz. Introduced in the episode "Hidden Agenda", they are shown committing more violent and arsonist acts than the first group.
    - Carter Wilson / Terminal (voiced by Michael Rosenbaum) is a student at Hamilton Hill High School who was obsessed with being the best at everything he did and led the second group of Jokerz in an attempt to kill Max Gibson.
    - Trey (voiced by Omar Gooding) is Terminal's "right-hand clown". He dropped out of school in the 6th grade to join the Jokerz. He used to be a member of J-Man's gang, but eventually joined Terminal's gang.
    - Tayko (voiced by Cree Summer) is a gymnast and a member of Terminal's branch of the Jokerz.
    - Weasel (voiced by Will Friedle) is a member of Terminal's branch of the Jokerz who wields various weapons, most prominently a flail.
  - The Third Jokerz Faction is introduced in Batman Beyond: Return of the Joker, where they work for Joker. An alternate timeline iteration of the Jokerz appear in the Justice League Unlimited episode "The Once and Future Thing, Part Two: Time, Warped", now working for Chronos and enhanced with superpowers and cybernetics. Their enhancements are undone when Batman prevents Chronos' alterations to the timeline.
    - Chucko (voiced by Don Harvey) is the masked leader of the Jokerz who wields a bazooka. In Justice League Unlimited, Chucko wields a double-bladed laser sword and has a hovering ball in place of legs. Chronos learns that Chucko was giving away information to the future Justice League and sends him back in time to the Cretaceous–Paleogene extinction event, killing him.
    - Bonk (voiced by Henry Rollins in Batman Beyond: Return of the Joker, Adam Baldwin in Justice League Unlimited) is a powerful, but surly enforcer for the Jokerz. The Joker kills him after being resurrected. In Justice League Unlimited, Bonk is equipped with a massive hammer that comes out of his arm.
    - Delia and Deidre Dennis (both voiced by Melissa Joan Hart), collectively referred to as the Dee Dees, are acrobats and the twin granddaughters of Harley Quinn. In Justice League Unlimited, the Dee Dees wield electric whips and possess the ability to duplicate themselves.
    - Ghoul (voiced by Michael Rosenbaum) is a gothic member of the Jokerz who wields various weapons housed in a plastic pumpkin. In Justice League Unlimited, Ghoul has a retractable spinning blade in his right arm.
    - Woof (vocal effects provided by Frank Welker in Batman Beyond: Return of the Joker, Dee Bradley Baker in Justice League Unlimited) is a Jokerz thug spliced with a spotted hyena. In Justice League Unlimited, Woof possesses cybernetic arms.
- Inque (voiced by Shannon Kenny) is a freelance criminal who gained shapeshifting abilities from a mutagenic treatment, being able to become black, ink-like liquid. She is shown to be vulnerable to immersion in water (which can disperse her substance and hampers her ability to re-form) and freezing temperatures.
  - Aaron Herbst (voiced by William H. Macy) is a disgruntled worker at Gotham Cryogenics where Inque was kept while frozen in a block of Ice. He develops an unhealthy admiration for her, rants to her about his problems, and is then fired after being caught on camera. Inque betrays Herbst, giving him half of the treatment that she was subjected to. Herbst ends up like Inque was, trapped in confinement and attended by someone as annoying as him.
  - Deanna Clay (voiced by Azura Skye) is Inque's estranged young adult daughter. Despite her mother setting up a trust fund for her, she does not live within her means and racks up huge amounts of debt.
- Willie Watt (voiced by Scott McAfee) is a nerdy student at Hamilton Hill High School who was constantly picked on by bullies at school, has unrequited feelings for Bobbi, and forced to deal with his overbearing father at home. He later gains telekinesis after bonding with the GoLeM (Galvanized Lifting Machine), a construction robot.
- Victor Fries / Mr. Freeze (voiced by Michael Ansara) is an ice-based villain and a former enemy of Batman who Derek Powers used in cloning experiments. When Victor's body deteriorates, leaving him only being able to survive in temperatures below -50 degrees, he escapes and obtains a new freeze suit. Freeze battles Blight and Batman, during which he chooses to die in the collapse of Blight's compound.
- The Terrific Trio are a group of scientists who were transformed into superpowered beings during an apparent lab accident. They attempt to use their powers for the benefit of society, but their conditions slowly drove them into insanity when it was discovered that their friend Dr. Hodges knew about the dangers of the experiment and it was rendering them unstable. Batman was able to defeat them. In Batman Beyond Unlimited #16, a new version of the Terrific Trio was formed consisting of Earth Mover, Plastic Man, and Zeta.
  - Mike Morgan / Magma (voiced by Robert Davi) is a humanoid lava creature with super-strength.
  - Mary Michaels / Freon (voiced by Laura San Giacomo) is a gaseous woman with ice-like powers.
  - Stewart Lowe / 2-D Man (voiced by Jeff Bennett) is a flat individual with stretching capabilities.
- Walter Shreeve / Shriek (voiced by Chris Mulkey) is a sound engineer who works for Derek Powers. He develops a special suit which allows him to manipulate sound. During a fight with Batman, Shreeve's suit is damaged, rendering him deaf. Though he develops a special headset to compensate for his hearing loss, the incident drives him insane and vengeful against Batman.
  - Ollie (voiced by Michael Rosenbaum) is a splicer of indeterminate species and Shriek's henchman.
- Charlie "Big Time" Bigelow (voiced by Stephen Baldwin in the first appearance, Clancy Brown in the second appearance) is a hoodlum and former friend of Terry McGinnis. Because of a previous incident that got them in trouble with the police, Terry only got four months in a youth correction center, while Charlie was old enough to be tried as an adult and received four years in prison. Charlie later reunites with Terry and is exposed to experimental chemicals that mutate him into a deformed monster.
- Richard Armacost (voiced by Robert Patrick) is an executive at the agricultural company Agri-Chem who was jailed for insider trading.
  - Karros (voiced by William H. Macy) is a mercenary and high-tech specialist employed by Agri-Chem.
- The Royal Flush Gang are a gang themed after playing cards founded by the original Batman's archenemy, the Joker, whose predecessors had fought him and his Justice League colleagues. They consist of:
  - King (voiced by George Lazenby) is the leader of the Royal Flush Gang.
  - Donna Walker / Queen (voiced by Amanda Donohoe in the first appearance, Sarah Douglas in later appearances) is the ex-wife of King. She and King break up after their arrest and King's affair with Sable.
  - Melanie Walker / Ten (voiced by Olivia d'Abo) - See above
  - Jack (voiced by Scott Cleverdon in the first appearance, Nicholas Guest in later appearances) is the son of King and Queen.
  - Ace is a strong silent android.
- Bane is a former enemy of Batman who was rendered frail and bedridden by constant use of the steroid Venom.
  - Jackson Chappell (voiced by Larry Drake) is Bane's personal attendant, who illegally produces and distributes Venom in the form of arm patches called Slappers.
- Mason Forrest (voiced by Ian Ziering) is a student at Hamilton Hill High School, and a player on its sports team; the High Hill Hawks. Along with his friends, they use Slappers to meet Coach Creager's expectations.
  - Dirk (voiced by David Walsh) is one of Mason's friends.
  - Jody (voiced by Marc Worden) is one of Mason's friends.
- Ira Billings / Spellbinder (voiced by Jon Cypher) is a bitter and underpaid psychologist at Terry's high school who commits crimes using sophisticated virtual reality systems and his knowledge of the human mind.
- The Society of Assassins are a secret group of assassins.
  - The Master Assassin (voiced by Victor Rivers) is the head of the Society of Assassins.
  - Curaré (voiced by Melissa Disney) is a silent member of the Society of Assassins who wields a laser-sharpened scimitar.
  - Mutro Botha (voiced by Tim Curry) is the last surviving member of the Society of Assassins who tries to blackmail Batman into protecting him from Curaré.
- Dr. Abel Cuvier (voiced by Ian Buchanan) is a doctor who starts a trend in infusing animal biology with human DNA known as "Splicing". Cuvier later injects himself with heavy doses of his vials and mutates himself into a genetic chimera with hawk, snake, and tiger traits. During the battle, Batman injects Cuvier with all the vials that he had, mutating him further into a monstrous form. Shortly afterward, Cuvier is caught in an explosion and presumed dead while his splicer followers had their modifications undone. In the second volume of the Batman Beyond tie-in comic, Cuvier is revealed to have survived and regressed to his first chimera form.
  - Raymond / Ramrod (voiced by Ice-T) is a delinquent spliced with bighorn sheep DNA and one of Cuvier's henchmen.
  - King Cobra (voiced by Tim Dang) is a delinquent spliced with king cobra DNA and one of Cuvier's henchmen.
  - Tigress (voiced by Cree Summer) is a woman spliced with tiger DNA and one of Cuvier's henchmen.
- The T's are a rival gang of the Jokerz. They are led by Fat T (voiced by Kevin Michael Richardson).
- Tony Maychek / The Earthmover (voiced by Stephen Collins) is an industrial worker who was transformed into a skeletal earth-manipulating creature after being buried in radioactive waste. He seeks revenge on his former business partner who abandoned him and raised his daughter as his own. The Earthmover later commits suicide by bringing down the cavern he resides in on top of himself.
- Robert Vance (voiced by Stacy Keach) is a businessman who created a virtual consciousness based on himself to guide his company after his death.
- The Stalker (voiced by Carl Lumbly) is a notorious African hunter who was enhanced with cybernetic implants after an encounter with a black panther that broke his spine.
- Mad Stan (voiced by Henry Rollins) is an anti-government terrorist who specializes in explosives.
- Ratboy (voiced by Taran Noah Smith) is a teenage runaway with rat-like features and the ability to telepathically control rats.
- The Brain Trust are a group of villainous psychics who forcibly recruit children with mental talents.
  - Bombshell (voiced by Kate Jackson) is a member of the Brain Trust who can generate explosive projectiles from her hands.
  - Invulnerable Man (voiced by Victor Rivers) is a member of the Brain Trust who can make himself invulnerable using telekinesis.
  - Edgar Mandragora (voiced by Brian Tochi in the first appearance, John Rhys-Davies in later appearances) is a member of the Brain Trust who possesses telepathy and telekinesis. Justice League Unlimited reveals that his father is the crime lord Steven Mandragora, who killed Helena Bertinelli's parents when she was young.
- Dr. David Wheeler (voiced by John Ritter) is the head of a "resort" for troubled kids called "the Ranch". Instead of helping the teenagers, he breaks their will by putting them in the ISO (an isolation room) and collects money from their guardians.
- James "Jim" Tate / Armory (voiced by Dorian Harewood) is a weapons designer working for a large defense contractor who is also the stepfather of one of Terry's friends Jared. After losing his job to Paxton Powers, Jim builds advanced weapons and armor and becomes the supervillain Armory to make ends meet.
- Istivan Hegedesh (voiced by Corey Burton) is a weapons designer at ForceTech and an old friend of Jim Tate.
- Ian Peek (voiced by Michael McKean) is the host of "The Inside Peek", a popular tabloid newscast, Ian Peek uses an experimental belt he stole that allows him to phase through solid objects, enabling him to uncover any celebrity's secrets and use them to boost ratings on his show. He nearly reveals both Terry and Bruce's secret identities, but ultimately loses control of his powers. Peek becomes permanently intangible and falls to the center of the Earth despite Batman's attempt to save him.
- Ma Mayhem (voiced by Kathleen Freeman) is the leader of a dysfunctional family of thieves.
  - Carl and Slim (voiced by Mark Rolston and Andy Dick respectively) are Ma Mayhem's sons.
- Cynthia (voiced by Shiri Appleby) is a synthoid (robot) illegally modified to resemble an attractive red haired teenage girl and commissioned by Howard Groote. Cynthia was designed to be possessive of Howard, becoming violent to anyone who approaches him or interferes in their relationship.
- Kobra is a terrorist organization bent on world domination. Its members include:
  - Zander (voiced by Alexis Denisof) is the heir of the organization's leadership, who was created by Kobra scientists to be the perfect leader. He quickly becomes attracted to Max, deciding to make her his queen. However, his plans are foiled by Batman and he is presumed dead when his air base crashes to the ground.
    - Dr. Childes (voiced by Xander Berkeley) is a high-ranking Kobra member who was in charge of Zander's upbringing.
  - Kobra One (voiced by Kerrigan Mahan) is a high-ranking Kobra leader.
  - Falseface (voiced by Townsend Coleman) is a thief-for-hire who can temporarily alter his appearance to resemble anyone he wants, with his normal appearance being disfigured and easily recognizable.
- The April Moon Gang are a gang of delinquents who wear retractable armor. They kidnapped Peter Corso's wife April Moon to give them cybernetic enhancements.
  - April "Moon" Corso (voiced by Daphne Zuniga) is a nurse and Peter Corso's wife. While it assumed that Harold and his friends kidnapped April for Dr. Corso to give them cybernetic enhancements. Batman and her husband later discovered that she was in on Harold's plot for a share of the loot, even having a relationship with him, when the two witness them kissing. Her fate afterwards is unknown.
  - Bullwhip (voiced by Jason Nash) is the leader of the April Moon Gang. Harold is a man who learned about Dr. Peter Corso's work with cybernetics while undergoing wrist replacement surgery. He blackmailed Corso into giving him and his friends cybernetic enhancements by kidnapping his wife April Moon. Bullwhip received retractable metal whips in his wrists. Unbeknownst to him and his gang, Corso rigs their implants with voice activated fail safes. Triggered by the command word; April Moon, that Batman uses to defeat his gang. He escapes and runs to Corso, demanding further upgrades. He lays himself on the surgeon's operating table, unaware that a vengeful Corso knows about his wife's infidelity with him. Harold is placed under anesthesia as Corso prepares to use a drill on him.
  - Terrapin (voiced by Ethan Embry) is a member of the April Moon Gang who can cover his body in robotic armor.
  - Knux (voiced by Johnny Galecki) is a member of the April Moon Gang who wields forearm-mounted hammers.
  - Kneejerk (voiced by Eric Michael Cole) is a member of the April Moon Gang who can produce chainsaws from his wrists and knees.
- Simon Harper (voiced by Tristan Rogers) is the producer of the role-playing video game Sentries of the Last Cosmos. Harper sends his Sentries to destroy any records of the true creator of the game, Eldon Michaels, who is suing him.
- Kenny Stanton / Payback (voiced by Adam Wylie as Kenny, Bill Fagerbakke as Payback) is a troubled, yet gifted child who was neglected by his father Dr. Stanton due to his work as a psychiatrist. Kenny believes that the only way his father would be able to spend time with him is to solve his patients' problems for him by taking revenge on his father's patients' tormentors. To this end, Kenny builds powered exoskeleton armed with an advanced laser cutter and takes the identity of Payback, intending to stand up for himself and other children. After being defeated by Batman, Kenny is arrested as Batman advises his father to reconcile with him.
- Ronny Boxer (voiced by Bill Smitrovich) is the head of a ring of underground dog fights. He experimented with an experimental growth hormone called Cerestone to create large, monstrous dogs.
- Doctor Suzuski / The Repeller (voiced by Gedde Watanabe) is a Wayne-Powers scientist who developed an experimental suit that could repel matter and used it to become a supervillain.
- Ra's al Ghul (voiced by David Warner) is the immortal leader of the League of Assassins, who possessed his daughter Talia after his body became too damaged to be healed.
  - Talia al Ghul (voiced by Olivia Hussey) is Ra's al Ghul's daughter.
- James van Dyle (voiced by Reiner Schöne) is a poacher who masquerades as an animal activist.
- The Major (voiced by Jon Polito) is a Gotham crime lord who took in Big Time and used him as his muscle.

=== Other characters ===
- The National Security Agency (NSA) is a counter-terrorism organization. The NSA initially appears in Batman Beyond and also appears in The Zeta Project, where its members attempt to capture Zeta.
  - Agent James Bennet (voiced by Joe Spano in the first appearance, Kurtwood Smith in later appearances) is an NSA officer.
  - Agent West (voiced by Michael Rosenbaum) is a bumbling NSA agent who follows Agent Bennet on their mission to hunt down Zeta.
  - Agent Lee (voiced by Lauren Tom) is an NSA agent who is frequently partnered with West, and questions her mission and Zeta's innocence. She is later convinced of Zeta's innocence and quits Bennet's team.
- Jackie Wallace (voiced by Lindsay Sloane) is a friend of Terry McGinnis and Dana Tan from Hamilton High, daughter of Tony Maychek, and the adoptive child of Bill Wallace.
- Bill Wallace (voiced by Dan Lauria) is an industrialist who is former business partner of Tony Maychek and adoptive father of Jackie Maychek following Tony's apparent death.
- Bobby Vance (voiced by Rider Strong) is Robert Vance's grandson.
- The Sentries of the Last Cosmos are ardent players of an in-depth virtual reality role-playing game. They consist of Corey Cavalieri (voiced by Chris Demetral), Dempsey (voiced by Seth Green), and Burfi (voiced by Alex Thomas Jr.).
- Tamara Caulder (voiced by Mara Wilson) is a young girl who is targeted by the Brain Trust due to her powerful telepathic abilities.
- Darius Arthur Kelman a.k.a. "Dak" (voiced by Eli Marienthal) is a young runaway who idolizes Batman's rogues gallery until the day he helped Batman defeat Shriek.
- Miguel Diaz (voiced by Sean Marquette) is a child who Kobra targeted because he knew Batman's secret identity.
- Dr. Peter Corso (voiced by Ed Begley Jr.) is a bionics specialist who designed the technology used by the April Moon Gang.
- Mr. Tan (voiced by Clyde Kusatsu) is Dana Tan's father. He disapproves of her relationship with Terry McGinnis because of his past as a juvenile delinquent.
- Kairi Tanaga (voiced by Takayo Fischer) is Terry McGinnis and Zander's martial arts instructor who previously trained alongside Bruce Wayne. She is later killed in battle with Zander.
- Bunny Vreeland (voiced by Lynne Moody) is the daughter of one of Bruce Wayne's closest friends, Veronica Vreeland, and the last person the original Batman saved prior to his retirement.
- Dr. Gray Stanton (voiced by Mitch Pileggi) is a counselor at the Gotham Youth Counseling Center. Due to him being busy, he neglected his son Kenny.
- Fingers (voiced by Malachi Throne) is a gorilla who was captured by poacher James van Dyle and spliced with human DNA, giving him human-level intelligence and the capability of speech. After Dyle's arrest, Fingers returns to Africa, vowing to protect his home from human aggressors.
- Dr. Price (voiced by Wendie Malick) is a scientist and vehicle designer who works for the U.S. Army.

== Episodes ==
Season	Episodes	Originally released	
Season	Episodes	First released	Last released
1	13	January 10, 1999	May 22, 1999
2	26	September 17, 1999	September 23, 2000
3	13	May 27, 2000	December 18, 2001

=== Crossovers ===
The third season of Batman Beyond featured the two-part episode "The Call" with (for the first time) a futuristic Justice League, a springboard for the Justice League animated series. The setting and characters of Batman Beyond were also briefly revived in Static Shock during the episode "Future Shock" in which Static is accidentally transported 40 years into the future.

Justice League Unlimited revisited the Batman Beyond world twice in 2005. The first was in "The Once and Future Thing" (Part 2), which featured Batman, Wonder Woman and Green Lantern transported 50 years into the future to stop Chronos with the help of the future Justice League (Terry McGinnis, Static, and Warhawk).

The second time was meant to be the de facto series finale for Batman Beyond: the episode "Epilogue" reveals that Bruce Wayne is Terry McGinnis's biological father. The story, set 15 years after Batman Beyond, centers on Terry (now in his early 30s) tracking down an elderly Amanda Waller. Waller explains that, even though she grew to trust and respect Batman, she was aware of him aging, getting slower, and getting weaker, thus accepting the idea of either Bruce retiring or being killed at some point. Finding the idea of a world without Batman unacceptable, Waller used her Project Cadmus connections to gather the technology for "Project Batman Beyond", whose goal was to physically create a new Batman, starting with a secretly collected sample of Bruce Wayne's DNA. Some years after Bruce retired, Waller found a young Neo-Gotham couple—the McGinnises—with psychological profiles nearly identical to those of Bruce's parents and gave Warren McGinnis a nanotech solution to rewrite his reproductive material with that of Bruce. The eventual result was his wife Mary McGinnis giving birth to Terry, a child sharing the genetic traits of his mother and Bruce Wayne. When Terry was eight years old, Waller employed an elderly Andrea Beaumont as an assassin to kill Terry's family, hoping the trauma would put him on the path to becoming Batman. However, Beaumont could not commit the act, arguing that she would be doing something against what Bruce stood for. Waller eventually conceded that Beaumont had been right and abolished the project altogether. Eight years afterward, Warren would be murdered because of Derek Powers, and Terry would meet Bruce by happenstance—resulting in Terry becoming Batman's successor. Waller concludes by reminding Terry that he is Bruce's son, not his clone, and that, despite the circumstances of his existence, he still has free will to live out his own life; Although not his clone she later tells Terry how he is not even close to as smart as Bruce Wayne but he does have his heart. Terry comes to terms with his revelations, and continues in being Batman. With a new sense of purpose, Terry plans to propose to Dana, while continuing his life of crimefighting.

=== Animation ===
In order to complete the series, Warner Bros. Animation outsourced Batman Beyond to Dong Yang Animation, Koko Enterprises and Seoul Movie (a subsidiary of TMS) in Seoul, South Korea. While the South Korean studios animated the series' episodes, the feature film Batman Beyond: Return of the Joker was animated by TMS Entertainment in Tokyo, Japan.

== Soundtrack ==
Batman Beyond

Soundtrack album by Shirley Walker, Kristopher Carter, Lolita Ritmanis, Michael McCuistion
- Released: August 31, 1999
- Length: 39:58
- Label: Rhino Entertainment

Professional ratings
Review scores
Source	Rating
Allmusic	4/5 stars

Released on August 31, 1999, the soundtrack to Batman Beyond features many of the same composers who worked on the previous animated Batman shows. The music style is more industrial, with some metal influence, to tie in with the show's futuristic cyberpunk genre.

Batman Beyond
No.	Title	Composer	Length
1.	"Batman Beyond (Main Title)"	Kristopher Carter	1:00
2.	"Cold vs. Hot"	Lolita Ritmanis	3:12
3.	"Terrific Trio vs. Rocketeers"	Michael McCuistion	1:50
4.	"Bat-Slapped in Store"	Kristopher Carter	1:16
5.	"Farewells"	Lolita Ritmanis	2:44
6.	"Batman Defeats Chappell"	Kristopher Carter	2:14
7.	"Batman Chases Inque"	Kristopher Carter	2:43
8.	"Yachting with the Card Gang"	Shirley Walker	2:09
9.	"Batman's First Fight"	Michael McCuistion	2:57
10.	"The Legacy Continues"	Michael McCuistion	1:24
11.	"Hotel Scuffle"	Shirley Walker	1:57
12.	"Trouble in the Museum"	Shirley Walker	1:46
13.	"Inque Escapes!"	Kristopher Carter	1:22
14.	"Nuclear Lab Destruction"	Michael McCuistion	1:54
15.	"Golem Chases Shoppers"	Shirley Walker	2:00
16.	"Willie Defeated"	Shirley Walker	2:37
17.	"Genetic Theft"	Michael McCuistion	1:29
18.	"Joker Chase"	Lolita Ritmanis	3:08
19.	"Move to the Groove"	Lolita Ritmanis	1:16
20.	"Batman Beyond (End Credits)"	Shirley Walker	1:00

== Reception ==
Den of Geek, when listing the best episodes of the series, wrote that "Batman Beyond's first year on the air represents the show at its most realized form. It's the only season of the show that's written at the same level of quality as Batman: The Animated Series. Not to say that later seasons don't have their moments, but it seemed like the writers approached Beyond as a Saturday morning cartoon during seasons two and three, whereas during season one, they most certainly did not." Creator Bruce Timm has stated Batman Beyond is the most uneven series of the main DC Animated Universe shows, particular in regard to the latter two seasons. Greg Weisman commented that while the series was well made, it felt more like a Spider-Man series and much less like Batman. Batman Beyond was cited by actor Jacob Bertrand, who voice-acted Bam the Batmobile in Batwheels, as his introduction to the Batman franchise.

=== Accolades ===
Over the course of its three-season run, Beyond was nominated ten times for Annie Awards and nine times for Emmy Awards in various categories, of which it won three Annies and two Emmys. Also, IGN, The Escapist, Comic Book Resources and some other websites placed Batman Beyond on their lists of best animated series.

== Home media ==
=== VHS ===
Some episodes of the series were released on VHS from 1999 to 2000, including the series' premiere (as Batman Beyond: The Movie), and select episodes as five VHS volumes containing three episodes per tape (the same contents as the individual DVD volume releases, see below), and the direct-to-video film Batman Beyond: Return of the Joker (edited version).

=== Season DVDs ===
DVD name	Release date	Episodes	Additional information
The Complete First Season	March 21, 2006	13	Special features: creators' commentary on two key episodes; Inside Batman Beyond: Meet the Series' Creators; Music of the Knight: Enjoy Score-Only Versions of Key Scenes.
The Complete Second Season	October 24, 2006	26	Special features: creators' commentary on two key episodes; Inside Batman Beyond: The Panel – In-Depth Dialogue with the Show's Creators. DVD art designed by Jesse Stagg at RDI.
The Complete Third Season	March 20, 2007	13	Special features: Inside Batman Beyond; featurettes on four episodes by producers, directors and Will Friedle. DVD art designed by Jesse Stagg at RDI.
The Complete Series	November 23, 2010	52	Special features: creator commentaries, season retrospectives, bonus 9th disc with 95 minutes of new special features, Secret Origin: The Story of DC Comics documentary and three all-new, all-revealing featurettes.

=== Individual DVDs ===
DVD name	Release date	Episodes	Additional information
Batman Beyond: Return of the Joker (edited version, 73 min.)	December 12, 2000	1	Commentary by the filmmakers*; behind-the-scenes documentary; deleted scenes; animation tests; music video Crash by Mephisto Odyssey featuring Static-X; animated character bios; interactive menus; production notes; trailers; scene access; subtitles: English and French.
Batman Beyond: Return of the Joker (uncut version, 76 min.)	April 23, 2002	1	Commentary by the filmmakers*; behind-the-scenes documentary; deleted scenes; animation tests; music video Crash by Mephisto Odyssey featuring Static-X; animated character bios; interactive menus; production notes; trailers; scene access; subtitles: English and French.
Batman Beyond: The Movie	May 18, 1999	6	Compilation of the first six episodes (by production order, not by air date) of the series: "Rebirth" (Parts 1 and 2), "Golem", "Dead Man's Hand", "Meltdown", and "The Winning Edge"
Batman Beyond: School Dayz and Spellbound	March 2, 2004	6	Contains the episodes: "Golem", "Heroes", "Spellbound", "Shriek", "Disappearing Inque", and "Hooked Up", plus all of the episodes as one long movie
Batman Beyond: Tech Wars and Disappearing Inque	March 2, 2004	6	

- *Note: The audio commentaries for both the edited and uncut versions of Batman Beyond: Return of the Joker were provided by the same contributors; however, both versions are slightly different from each other.

=== Blu-ray ===
Batman Beyond was released on Blu-ray on October 29, 2019. The four-disc set includes all 52 episodes and the uncut version of Batman Beyond: Return of the Joker. Forty-one of the episodes and Return of the Joker were remastered. The remaining 11 episodes were an upconversion.

== Spin-off ==
A spin-off from Batman Beyond, an animated series called The Zeta Project, featured the android Zeta from the Batman Beyond episode "Zeta", who was redesigned to possess a more humanoid appearance. Batman would guest star in the episode "Shadows". The super villain Stalker was to have appeared in The Zeta Project episode "Taffy Time", but ultimately did not do so. The second-season episode "Ro's Gift" has an appearance by the Brain Trust from the Batman Beyond episode "Mind Games". Terry McGinnis/Batman was originally slated to appear in this episode as well, but was cut since Bruce Timm and company were working on Justice League.

== In other media ==
=== Books ===
Batman Beyond: Return of the Joker, a novelization of the feature film written by Michael Teitelbaum, was released on November 1, 2000.

Two Batman Beyond books for young readers were released on November 14, 2000: Batman Beyond: New Hero in Town and Batman Beyond: No Place Like Home, followed by two more, released on May 28, 2002: Batman Beyond: Hear No Evil and Batman Beyond: Grounded.

=== Toys ===
In 1999, Hasbro released a Batman Beyond Toyline with sub-lines. In 2000, Burger King included Batman Beyond toys in their kids' meals.

In 2023, Bandai Namco released DC versions of the Vital Bracelet Digital Monster (Vital Hero in the USA) toy line. These included many heroes and villains from the DC universe along with a bundle-only Batman-themed card. The Batman card contains multiple versions of Batman and Robin including Terry McGinnis.

=== Films ===
A direct-to-video feature film, Batman Beyond: Return of the Joker, was released on December 12, 2000. The original release was censored for elements of violence and death following the Columbine High School massacre, though a second, uncensored version was later released. Nevertheless, it received critical acclaim for its story, voice acting, animation and score. A second Batman Beyond film, focusing on the origins of Terry McGinnis, multiple clones of Bruce Wayne, and the appearance of an elderly Selina Kyle, was planned by Bruce Timm and Glen Murakami, though it was never scripted, as it never went beyond a 45-minute impromptu plotting session between the two. The project was scrapped due to the dark tones and controversies surrounding Batman Beyond: Return of the Joker. Despite this, the plot elements were eventually reworked into the second-season finale of Justice League Unlimited titled "Epilogue" (which was intended to be the series finale until the show was renewed for a third and final season) where Terry discovers his genetic origins. Amanda Waller planted Bruce Wayne's DNA into Warren McGinnis through his routine flu shot and later helps create a copy of Bruce Wayne; Selina Kyle is briefly mentioned in passing.

Among the live action films proposed between the critical failure of Batman & Robin and the reboot of the Batman franchise was Batman Beyond. In August 2000, Warner Bros. announced that it was developing a live-action film adaptation with Boaz Yakin attached to co-write and direct. The TV series' creators, Dini and Alan Burnett, were hired to write a screenplay for the feature film, with Neal Stephenson as consultant. Yakin hoped to cast Clint Eastwood as the retired Batman. By July 2001, a first draft was turned in to the studio, and the writers were waiting to see if a rewrite would be needed. The studio, also exploring other takes of Batman in development, eventually placed Batman Beyond on hold in August 2001, but ultimately canceled the proposal. Yakin reportedly wanted the film to be dark, nihilistic, and with swearing and violence, and not the PG-13 film the studio wanted.

In January 2019, rumors began to circulate that Warner Animation Group was developing an animated Batman Beyond film following the critical and commercial success of Sony Pictures Animation's Spider-Man: Into the Spider-Verse, but was later reported that no such film was in the works. In the later August interview with DC Universe, Paul Dini revealed that Warner Bros. continues to express interest in a film adaptation but have put emphasis on other projects. Actor Tyler Posey has expressed interest in playing Terry McGinnis in the possible film adaptation. In June 2020, Michael Keaton entered talks to play an elderly Bruce Wayne, reprising his role from Tim Burton's Batman (1989) and Batman Returns (1992), in the DCEU film The Flash, which was set for release in 2023. According to The Hollywood Reporter, Warner Bros. hopes for Keaton to return for multiple DCEU films in a way "akin to the role played by Samuel L. Jackson as Nick Fury in the Marvel Cinematic Universe, something of a mentor or guide or even string-puller". Keaton was officially confirmed to return in August of the same year. In December 2022, it was announced that Christina Hodson, writer of The Flash and the cancelled Batgirl film, had been hired to write a script for a live-action Batman Beyond film. The plot would have involved an aged Bruce Wayne, continuing the plot threads from his appearance in The Flash, and would have included the return of Michelle Pfeiffer's Catwoman. Development on the film was shelved after James Gunn and Peter Safran were appointed as co-heads of DC Studios. In January 2023, Gunn and Safran stated that there is potential for a future multiverse project in which they may incorporate Keaton's incarnation of Batman.

In March 2023, it was reported that an animated Batman Beyond film had been put into development, written by Daniel Casey and serving as WB's answer to Spider-Man: Into the Spider-Verse. However, the project was put into commission under the leadership of Walter Hamada, who served as DC Films president from 2018 to 2022, and it is currently unknown if it is still happening under Gunn and Safran's direction, though Jeff Sneider of The Hollywood Reporter noted that nobody who was working on the project was told it was cancelled.

In December 2023, a Batman Beyond fan film titled Batman Beyond: Year One was being developed, with Michael Yu writing, co-producing, and directing the film, with Ryan Potter cast as Terry McGinnis / Batman. Potter previously portrayed Gar Logan / Beast Boy / Changeling in the HBO Max television series Titans (2018-2023). Batman Beyond: Year One was crowdfunded through Indiegogo and was released on YouTube on November 16, 2024. In October 2024, during Los Angeles Comic Con, additional casting was revealed, including Isabelle Hahn as Melanie Walker, Fiona Dorn as Dottie, Justin Vancho as Spike, and Koki Tomlinson as Jack Walker, with the story taking inspiration from the pilot episode of Batman Beyond.

=== Video games ===
A "Batman of the Future" character pack featuring the Terry McGinnis Batman with all its trademark gadgets (such as the flying suit and the ability to turn invisible) and other Batman Beyond-era characters were revealed to be PS3/PS4-exclusive DLC for Lego Batman 3: Beyond Gotham.

=== Animation ===
In April 2014, a Batman Beyond short by Darwyn Cooke premiered at WonderCon. The short, which saw Will Friedle and Kevin Conroy reprise their roles, sees Batman (Terry McGinnis) battle a Batman android (resembling the design from The New Batman Adventures) in the Batcave with help from the elderly Bruce Wayne and the Batmobile (resembling the design from Batman: The Animated Series). Once defeated, Batman and Bruce look out to see and prepare to fight seven additional invading androids resembling the designs from Beware the Batman, The Batman, Batman: The Brave and the Bold, The Dark Knight Returns, Batman (1989 film), Batman (1960s TV series), and the original design by Bill Finger. Though the androids' source is unstated, they are reminiscent of the story arc from Batman: The Animated Series involving the computer program HARDAC, implying its return.

Batman Beyond is alluded in Teen Titans Go! In the episode "Sandwich Thief", Robin travels to the future to his future self, Nightwing's apartment where a poster of the Batman Beyond Batman can be seen, indicating that Nightwing admires this incarnation of Batman.

== See also ==
- Batman Beyond comic book
- Batman Beyond: Return of the Joker, a spin-off movie
- Batman Beyond: Return of the Joker, a spin-off video game
- Batman Beyond: Year One, a fan film
