= Batman Beyond: Return of the Joker (video game) =

2000 video game

- North American PlayStation box art
- Developer: Kemco
- Publisher: Ubi Soft
- Series: Batman
- Platforms: Game Boy Color, PlayStation, Nintendo 64
- Release: PlayStation: NA: October 30, 2000; EU: December 15, 2000; AU: May 2001; Game Boy Color: NA: November 15, 2000; Nintendo 64: NA: December 13, 2000; EU: December 15, 2000
- Genre: Scrolling beat 'em up
- Mode: Single-player

Batman Beyond: Return of the Joker, known as Batman of the Future: Return of the Joker in Europe, is a scrolling beat 'em up video game developed by Kemco and released by Ubi Soft for the Game Boy Color, PlayStation and Nintendo 64 in 2000 and 2001. The game is based on the animated film of the same name, which in turn was based on the TV series Batman Beyond. Players act as the new Batman Terry McGinnis, who takes over the position of the retired Bruce Wayne and fights against the Jokerz gang led by the recently revived Joker. Throughout the game, Batman fights the villain's cronies, who steal tech components from various laboratories and corporations in Gotham City. Joker uses them to take control of a missile-shooting satellite, which he plans to destroy the entire city with.

Although presented at the 2000 E3 convention, Batman Beyond: Return of the Joker received sparse pre-release coverage. It garnered overwhelmingly negative critical reviews for its Nintendo 64 and PlayStation versions, and a mixed reception for the Game Boy Color release. Despite some positive comments towards its multiple-batsuit mechanic and cutscenes, the game was heavily criticized for its outdated and repetitive beat 'em up style, low enemy AI, the uselessness of weapons and suits, amateurish graphics, and poor sound. The unbalanced challenge was also condemned; Game Boy Color and Nintendo 64 versions were reported to be beaten within a few hours, while the PlayStation was stated to become excessively difficult by the second stage, made worse by lack of a password system.

== Gameplay ==
An example of gameplay in Batman Beyond: Return of the Joker

Batman Beyond is a side-scrolling beat 'em up game similar to Streets of Rage, Final Fight, and Double Dragon. The player, through four stages (The Air and Space Museum, Bruce Wayne Enterprises, Arkham, and the Jolly Jack Toy Factory) acts as the new Batman Terry McGinnis, whose foes are members of the Jokerz gang and range from werewolves to giant robots with spinning arms that fall off to harm Batman. The PlayStation and Nintendo 64 versions allow the player to select and switch between four suits, three of them (Standard, Offensive, and Defensive) available from the start. All of them hold different abilities and weapons. The Standard suit gives Batman a variety of jumps, attacks, defenses, and three weapons: a Magnetic Nunchaku that can be charged to deal extra damage, a Staff that can kill enemies in fewer hits, and a fast-moving Discus that can slice through foes. The Offensive increases Batman's punching power but at the cost of being able to defend, Defensive increases his ability to protect himself at the cost of less attack power, and the Nimble suit increases Batman's maneuverability, allowing him to perform acrobatic jumps and glide in the air. In the Game Boy Color release, there is no suit-changing mechanic; Batman has a set of punches, kicks and uppercuts, and weapons such as the Dark Knight Staff and Nun Chucks.

== Plot ==
It is the middle of the 21st century, 20 years since Batman was publicly last seen in Gotham City. The metropolitan area's research and development lab, named Air & Space, is taken over by a gang of self-described "Jokerz", which Terry McGinnis, the new Batman replacing the retired Bruce Wayne, is alerted to via an emergency signal. Batman gets to the lab and finds Benjamin Knox and one of the Jokerz; Benjamin instructs the gang member to handle the console while he fights Batman. The member screws it up, and all of the gang members leave with only the memory board. Terry reveals this is the third time a stealing of high-tech equipment has occurred, making Bruce suspect a group named the Jokerz are responsible.

It is then revealed the Joker has been revived and is leading the group. After his cronies' efforts produce nothing more than stealing a single memory board, he hatches a plan to distract the guards of Wayne Enterprises while the thieves steal equipment from the building. The robbery occurs as Bruce publicly announces returning to leadership of the corporation, and involves the Joker taking the former superhero hostage. Commissioner Barbara Gordon informs Terry that while all the guests are safe, Bruce is in the Joker's clutches. With the property under Joker's control, his minions disable the security system. Terry, as Batman, gets to the top of the building and meets the Joker in person for the first time before fighting with Woof the Hyena-Man. Meanwhile, Chucko obtains a component needed for Joker's plan, Joker frees Bruce, and all the Jokerz escape.

Batman, against the will of Bruce, searches for clues at the now-abandoned Arkham Asylum, where the Joker was formerly imprisoned. Not expecting to notice anyone, he finds the Jokerz searching around for more essential components. The Joker appears again "reminiscing" of his time in the asylum, and is accompanied by Ghoul of which Batman fights. As Batman is about to fight the Joker after defeating Ghoul, the Joker announces he will "burn everything to ashes" and storms off. When Batman returns to his headquarters, he finds Bruce unconscious.

Informing Barbara about the situation, Batman tells her about Bruce's recent strange behavior. Barbara informs him that, 40 years ago, the Joker captured Bruce's sidekick Tim Drake, also known as Robin, and altered his personality to turn him into "Joker Junior". Although his memory was recovered within a year, Bruce, out of life-long guilt of the situation, prohibited Tim from being Robin ever again. After leaving, Tim became a high-level communications engineer.

Batman goes to Tim's laboratory for information, but instead finds the Joker. He reveals he is using the stolen parts, as well as communication codes coerced out of Tim, to take control of one of the US governments' orbiting defense satellites, of which he will shoot missiles at Gotham City. Batman suspects the Jokerz' hideout is in Jolly Jack Candy Factory, as Joker had a jar of jelly beans from the location, and goes there. Batman gets to the basement of the factory, fighting Chucko and the Dee Dee sisters along the way, and finds Joker already having control of the satellite and mind-controlling Tim. The Joker reveals himself to actually be Tim with the Joker's microchip of his DNA in his brain. Batman defeats the Joker, stops the satellite, and frees Tim from the Joker's mind-control, although the news reports the Batman and Joker disappearing.

== Development and release ==
Developed by Kemco, Batman Beyond: Return of the Joker is based on the direct-to-video film of the same name. The film was released on October 24, 2000, and was an adaptation of the television series Batman Beyond. It is the only Batman Beyond video game ever made. Kemco first presented Game Boy, PlayStation and Nintendo 64 versions of Batman Beyond: Return of the Joker at E3 2000. Kemco joined with Ubisoft to publish Batman Beyond: Return of the Joker. The PlayStation version was released in North America on October 30, 2000, and Europe on December 15, while the Game Boy Color port was released on November 15. The Nintendo 64 version released on December 13, 2000, in North America. The PlayStation version was released by Jack of All Games in Australia in May 2001.

Preview coverage from publications was very low. Only IGN covered the E3 presentation, and were the first to reveal certain aspects of the game, as well as several screenshots and videos of it. This included its 3D action fighting genre, the source material it was based on, the plot, and the fact that Batman fights in "hallways and narrow rooms" against clown enemies armed with big weapons. The website claimed that despite its popular license, it had skepticism towards it lack of innovation with its genre and that Batman's suit and weapons did not inflict any more damage than the regular punches and kicks. It was also critical towards the poor translation from Japanese to English in the press materials. Nintendo Power's only bit of coverage of the Nintendo 64 version before its release was a one-page article in the October 2000 issue.

== Reception ==
Reception

Review scores
Publication	Score		
Publication	GBC	N64	PS
AllGame	2.5/5	2.5/5	2/5
Electronic Gaming Monthly	N/A	1.5/10	3/30
EP Daily	N/A	N/A	4/10
Game Informer	N/A	N/A	0.5/10
GameFan	N/A	49/100; 70/100; 61/100; 61/100	N/A
GameRevolution	N/A	F	N/A
IGN	6/10	2/10	2/10
Jeuxvideo.com	N/A	6/20	5/20
MeriStation	N/A	N/A	5.8/10
N64 Magazine	N/A	16%	N/A
Next Generation	N/A	N/A	1/5
Nintendo Power	N/A	5.6/10	N/A
Official Nintendo Magazine	N/A	66%	N/A
PlayStation Official Magazine – UK	N/A	N/A	1/10
Official U.S. PlayStation Magazine	N/A	N/A	0.5/5
Super Game Power	N/A	N/A	8/10
Video Games (DE)	4/5	N/A	N/A
64	45%	65%	N/A
Game Boy Power	90%	N/A	N/A
N64 Gamer	N/A	13%	N/A
Total Game Boy	65%	N/A	N/A
Video Gamer	N/A	1/10	N/A

Reviews of the Nintendo 64 and PlayStation versions of Batman Beyond: Return of the Joker were overwhelmingly negative. Sources such as Electronic Gaming Monthly, Game Informer, GameRevolution, and IGN gave extremely low scores and comparisons to Superman 64 (1999). In January 2006, Electronic Gaming Monthly ranked the PlayStation version as the tenth worst-reviewed game in the magazine's entire run, the Nintendo 64 release listed as one of only five honorable mentions. In its 2023 ranking of every North American N64 game, Hard Drive called Return of the Joker the worst title on the console, saying it was a "devastatingly bad brawler that’s as devoid of redeeming qualities as Bruce Wayne is parents." Even the least cynical critics expressed disappointment, concluding only beginner gamers, beat-'em'-up enthusiasts, and fans of the source material would enjoy it for a short time. The Game Boy Color version was more well-received, although covered less and with generally mixed reviews. Its most enthusiastic critic was Total Game Boy's Ian Osborne, who called it one of the best beat 'em ups on the handheld console.

The most frequent complaint was the repetitive and basic gameplay, which amounted to nothing more than repeatedly defeating enemies and collecting keys. The game's left-to-right Final Fight-esque beat 'em up genre was considered outdated and unoriginal. AllGame and 64 felt its slow pace added to the problem, and The Electric Playground criticized the lack of a two-player mode, a staple of other beat-'em-ups. IGN and N64 Gamer condemned Batman's limited number of attacks, specifically the lack of combo moves. An IGN review of the Game Boy Color version, argued the incorporation of multiple paths added originality to the old-fashioned formula, but the experience was still linear, because the paths all lead to the same destination.

Reviews of the Nintendo 64 and Game Boy Color versions revealed beating them in a very short of amount time, most commonly within one-to-two hours. On the other hand, reviews of the PlayStation reported a difficulty spike by the second level, and claimed it was very hard, made worse by the lack of a save feature. Some reviewers attributed the short length and easy challenge to another commonly brought-up aspect, the enemies' low intelligence. GameRevolution and N64 Magazine claimed the Defensive suit was overpowered to the point where enemies and bosses, even the final Joker, were defeated within seconds. In the PlayStation version, an EGM writer revealed an inability to come in contact with enemies, yet the "incredibly stupid" foes still manage to hit the player even when moving.

Some praise went towards the different bat suits. Some critics stated they added some strategy, excitement and replay value to the overall monotonous experience. Conversely, the weapons and costumes were considered useless and Batman's kick the most useful attack. Nix was mixed towards the Game Boy Color's weapons, finding all of them lacking in range and the Nun Chucks "horribly weak", although stated that the Dark Knight Staff was useful.

The graphics were widely consider sub-standard, consisting of character models, animations, backgrounds, textures, and environments that were lacking in detail and polygons. Even a favorable review from Super Game Power acknowledged the visuals' simplicity, such as the lack of animation and variation in the appearances of enemies and environments. GameFan and GameRevolution opined it failed to capture the show's unique art style. The music and sound were also met with criticism, specifically towards its lack of sound effects, absence of the film's voice acting, and uninspired ear-piercing rock music that constantly loops a "screeching" guitar line. IGN found the Game Boy Color's visuals "serviceable" but "limited" and "sickly choppy", especially when multiple sprites were on screen. His praises were targeted at Batman's "sharp and fierce" sprite and the animations where he lets out his wings, while a major negative was set on the expressionless, "blocky and corny" enemies.

Reviews were more positive towards the cutscenes. N64 Magazine suggested the Nintendo 64's cutscenes looked and like an episode of the television series. Critics of the Game Boy version, released only weeks before the film, were excited by the plot provided by the cutscenes. However, the cutscenes were still the subject of criticism from reviewers that found them "primitive", laughably bad, amateur-looking, and filled with inaccuracies to the source material.

== See also ==
- List of video games notable for negative reception
