= Ryan Potter =

American actor (born 1995)

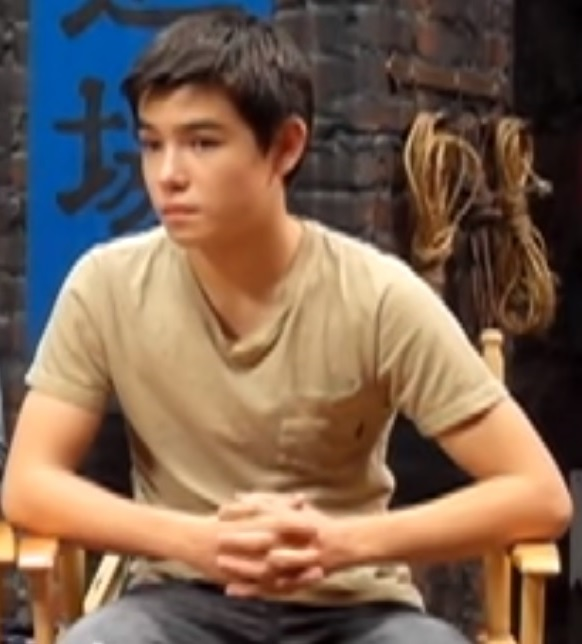
- Potter in 2011
- Born: Ryan Kenichi Hagimoto; September 12, 1995 (age 31); Portland, Oregon, U.S.
- Occupations: Actor; martial artist
- Years active: 2010–present
- Known for: Big Hero 6 Titans; Supah Ninjas
- Relatives: James Lew (step-father)

Ryan Potter (born Ryan Kenichi Hagimoto; September 12, 1995) is an American actor and martial artist. He made his acting debut as the lead of the Nickelodeon action comedy series Supah Ninjas (2011–2013). As a voice actor, he voiced Hiro Hamada in the animated superhero film Big Hero 6 (2014), its television series sequel (2017–2021) and the Disney+ series Baymax! (2022). Potter also portrayed Gar Logan / Beast Boy on the DC Universe / HBO Max superhero series Titans (2018–2023).

== Early life ==
Potter was born Ryan Kenichi Hagimoto in Portland, Oregon on September 12, 1995. His father, Keiji Hagimoto, is Japanese, while his mother, Jordanna Alex Potter-Lew, is an American, of paternal English, German, and Swedish descent, and maternal Russian Jewish and Ukrainian Jewish ancestry. Shortly after his birth, Potter’s family returned to Tokyo, Japan, where he was raised, until returning to the United States with his mother just before his 7th birthday. He was then raised by his single mother and changed his name to her maiden name.

In 2014, his mother remarried to Chinese-American martial artist and Hollywood stuntman James Lew, making Potter his stepson. Potter's first language was Japanese; however, he is no longer fluent.

At the age of eight, he began studying White Tiger kung fu, a discipline which he would continue to pursue throughout his teenage years. Other childhood interests reportedly included baseball, skateboarding, and playing the drums.

== Career ==
In 2010, Potter began his acting career at the age of 13 when he received a leaflet in his kung fu class announcing Nickelodeon was looking for teenagers to star in a new martial-arts themed program entitled Supah Ninjas. After a few days of considering an acting career, Potter decided to audition, eventually landing the series' lead role of Mike Fukanaga, a typical American teen who discovers that he is descended from a long line of ninjas. In March 2012, Nickelodeon announced it had renewed Supah Ninjas for a second season.

Following the premiere of Supah Ninjas in January 2011, he became one of Nickelodeon's popular young stars, featured in numerous teen magazines and making personal appearances in the network's special Nickelodeon's Worldwide Day of Play and its reboot of Figure It Out, as well as an appearance on its sister network's broadcast of the 2011 TeenNick HALO Awards. In March 2012, Potter began a recurring role on Fred: The Show, portraying Fred's best friend.

Potter later voiced Big Hero 6 protagonist Hiro Hamada and reprised his role in the animated series based on the film and Kingdom Hearts III. The film would later go on to win "Best Animated Feature" at the 2015 87th Academy Awards.

Potter was also lobbying for the role of Tim Drake and created a concept fight scene using the character's signature bō staff as an audition. He ended the video with a challenge to Ben Affleck to cast him as Robin. He was then cast as Beast Boy in the DC Universe / HBO Max series Titans.

From 2020 to 2022, he voiced the character Kenji Kon in Jurassic World: Camp Cretaceous on Netflix.

In 2024, Potter was announced to be starring in a fan film based on the Warner Bros. animated series Batman Beyond titled Batman Beyond: Year One, with Potter set to play the lead role of Terry McGinnis / Batman.

== Advocacy ==
In 2011, Potter founded the organization Toy Box of Hope, a charity which holds an annual holiday collection drive for children in homeless shelters and transitional living facilities in the Los Angeles area. During the second annual event in 2012, Potter spoke of the focus of the organization, stating "[W]hat we want to do is provide bedsheets, jackets and toys to [homeless shelters], so these kids are like, 'Wow, someone cares, there's hope.'" In 2012, Potter was reportedly planning to expand Toy Box of Hope to include a "Birthday Party Box" program.

In June 2012, Potter became one of the youngest celebrities to lend his voice to California's No H8 Campaign in support of same-sex marriage. When explaining his involvement, 16-year-old Potter stated, "I know what it feels like to be bullied. And I will not tolerate the thought of anyone, for any reason, being bullied. It starts with young people, and it can end with young people. As we learn to embrace our diversity, we become stronger, more tolerant. The differences are beautiful. The differences matter. It's what makes life an adventure."

== Filmography ==
=== Film ===
Year	Title	Role	Notes
2014	Senior Project	Peter Hammer	Main role
2014	Big Hero 6	Hiro Hamada	Voice role
2015	Underdog Kids	Eric Barret	
2016	Throne of Elves	Fish	Voice role; English dub
2018	Running for Grace	Jo	Main role
2024	Batman Beyond: Year One	Terry McGinnis / Batman	Lead role; Fan film

=== Television ===
Year	Title	Role	Notes
2011–2013	Supah Ninjas	Mike Fukanaga	Main role
2012	Figure It Out	Himself	Panelist, 9 episodes
2012	Fred: The Show	Bryan	2 episodes
2016	Lab Rats: Elite Force	Riker	Recurring role
2017–2021	Big Hero 6: The Series	Hiro Hamada	Main voice role
2018–2023	Titans	Garfield Logan / Beast Boy	Main role; story writer: "Dude, Where’s My Gar?"
2019	Where's Waldo?	Koichi	Guest voice role; episode: "Big in Japan"
2020–2022	Jurassic World Camp Cretaceous	Kenji Kon	Main voice role
2022	Baymax!	Hiro Hamada	Main voice role; miniseries
2025	Star Wars: Visions	Ron	Guest voice role; episode: "The Lost Ones"

=== Audio ===
Year	Title	Role	Notes
2020	We Are Not Free	Shigeo "Shig" Ito	Audiobook; Chapter 2

=== Video games ===
Year	Title	Voice	Notes
2014	Disney Infinity: Marvel Super Heroes	Hiro Hamada	
2015	Disney Infinity 3.0	Hiro Hamada	
2019	Kingdom Hearts III	Hiro Hamada	
2025	Disney Speedstorm	Hiro Hamada	
