= Senior Project (film) =

- Directed by: Nadine Truong
- Written by: Jeremy Lin
- Produced by: Fabienne Wen; Stephanie Gauger; Yaron Kaplan
- Starring: Ryan Potter; Vanessa Marano; Kyle Massey; Meaghan Martin; Sterling Beaumon; Lana Mckissack; Margaret Cho
- Cinematography: Kobi Zaig
- Edited by: Youssef Delara
- Music by: Aaron Symonds
- Release date: 2014
- Running time: 84 minutes
- Country: United States
- Language: English

Senior Project is a 2014 film directed by Nadine Truong and written by Jeremy Lin. It stars Ryan Potter.

== Premise ==
A new kid at school hiding a secret must work with his classmates on a senior project.

== Cast ==
- Ryan Potter as Peter Hammer
- Vanessa Marano as Samantha "Sam" Willow
- Kyle Massey as Andy
- Meaghan Martin as Natalia Bell
- Sterling Beaumon as Spencer Grace
- Lana McKissack as Jill
- Margaret Cho as Ms. Ghetty
- Katalina Viteri as Tiffany
- Lynn Telzer as Jennifer

== Development ==
A successful KickStarter campaign for the film was launched by 16-year-old writer Jeremy Lin. Donating $1 gave backers a 'Spiritual Connection' and $5000 allowed them to appear as extras.

Lin was given the chance to pitch his script to screenwriter and investor Fabienne Wen at a film workshop. Brion Hambel and Paul Jenson then came on board as producers.

The first clip from the film was released on 8 April 2014. A video from the last day of the set was released on 27 October 2013.

The trailer was released on 27 May 2014.

== Release ==
The film has been released on iTunes and Amazon Video.
