= Royal Flush Gang =

DC Comics supervillains

- The Royal Flush Gang as depicted on the cover of Justice League of America (vol. 2) #35 (September 2009). Art by Eddy Barrows.

Publication information
- Publisher: DC Comics
- First appearance: Justice League of America #43 (March 1966)
- Created by: Gardner Fox (writer); Mike Sekowsky (artist)

In-story information
- Member(s): Ace; King; Queen; Jack; Ten; Wild Card or Wildcard (some versions); Joker (some versions)

The Royal Flush Gang is a group of supervillains appearing in American comic books published by DC Comics. The group, which debuted in Justice League of America #43 (March 1966), use a playing card theme. Their code names are based on the cards needed to form a royal flush in poker: Ace, King, Queen, Jack, and Ten. Joker occasionally affiliates himself with the gang, but is not a consistent member. The group returned to battle the Justice League of America many times, and also appeared in other comics, including Wonder Woman, Formerly Known as the Justice League and Superman.

The gang has also appeared in many animated television adaptations, including The Super Powers Team: Galactic Guardians in 1985, Batman Beyond in 1999 and 2000, Justice League in 2003 and 2005, and Batman: The Brave and the Bold in 2009 and 2010.

The Royal Flush Gang also made appearances in the live-action Arrowverse TV shows Arrow in 2012 and The Flash in 2015 and 2021. The comic book versions seen in the 2013 Forever Evil storyline were redesigned to resemble their appearance in Arrow.

== Publication history ==
The Royal Flush Gang first appeared in Justice League of America #43 in March 1966 under the leadership of Amos Fortune and were created by Gardner Fox and Mike Sekowsky.

== Fictional team history ==
=== First Gang: Clubs ===
The first Royal Flush Gang, Mike Sekowsky

The original Royal Flush Gang was Professor Amos Fortune's childhood gang. King was a man named Kerry, Queen was a woman named Queenie, Jack was an unnamed man, and Ten was a strongman named Thomas Dillon. With Fortune himself as Ace, they fought the Justice League, using Fortune's luck-altering technology to realize the fortune-telling significance of playing cards.

After Fortune abandoned the Gang, a new Ace became the leader and they attempted to steal four paintings containing clues to a hidden treasure, but were thwarted by Joker's manipulations. Most of them then abandoned their criminal careers, although Jack briefly joined the Secret Society of Super Villains as "Hi-Jack".

Fortune's gang wore costumes based on the suit of clubs, but when they fought the Joker, the second Ace convinced them to change them to the suit of spades.

In the pages of JLA Classified, it was revealed the original Royal Flush Gang (sans Fortune) reunited to fight the "Detroit Era" Justice League and their successors in the second gang. In this battle, the original King, Queen and Ten were all killed.

=== Second Gang: Spades ===
The second Royal Flush Gang was formed by Green Lantern villain Hector Hammond in Justice League of America #203. Hammond led the group as "Wildcard". This version wore costumes based on the suit of spades. The gang split up and went on to have separate criminal careers before re-establishing themselves, without Hammond. They were twice hired by Maxwell Lord as part of his manipulation of Justice League International. Later, they were reorganized and reoutfitted by a successor to the Gambler masquerading as the Joker.

The membership of this group consists of:

- King (Joe Carny): The so-called "King of the Hoboes", Carny also suffered from lung disease. As Hammond's agent, he wore a costume that technologically enhanced his charisma to the point of mind control. During the Invasion! storyline, King gains immortality from the Dominators' metagene bomb.
- Queen (Mona Taylor): Taylor was originally a Broadway star whose alcoholism destroyed her career. As Hammond's agent, she wielded a sceptre that cast realistic illusions. After the Gambler reoutfitted the team, she began employing a wrist shooter that fires razor sharp spades.
- Jack (name unknown): Originally a gigolo, he became a fugitive after inadvertently killing a client while attempting to steal her jewelry. As Hammond's agent, he wielded an energy sword. The Gambler replaced his left eye with a cybernetic laser weapon.
- Ten (Wanda Wayland): Wayland was a test pilot fired for refusing her employer's sexual advances. As Hammond's agent, she wore a costume with energy blasters in its gloves. She has enhanced reflexes, and carries explosive playing cards.
- Ace: The first Ace ("Derek Reston") was an android resembling an African-American man. A second Ace (Ernie Clay) was recruited by King and used a strength-enhancing exoskeleton provided by the Gambler. In Starman and Infinite Crisis, the team was once again employing the robot Ace.

King, Queen and Ten also have blaster-pistols. The Gang fly on hovering playing cards. In the Gang's appearances in Teen Titans, Ten had organized runaways as "Ten's Little Indians", a gang of thieves dressed as the two through nine of spades and armed with bows and trick arrows.

King later leaves the Royal Flush Gang to find a better job, while the remaining Royal Flush Gang members meet with Brain Wave and the other supervillains in a mountainous cave to consider reforming the Secret Society of Super Villains. When the villains leave the cave, they were all defeated by the Justice League as Brain Wave is revealed to be Martian Manhunter in disguise.

=== Third Gang: All Suits ===
In the post-Crisis DC Universe, there were multiple active, costumed members, some of whom derived their outfits and codenames from cards with pip values lower than ten. The Royal Flush Gang is now an organization that reaches across America, with cells in major cities. Instead of five members, each "cell" has fifty-two, split into four suits run by the "court cards". The Aces of Clubs, Diamonds, Hearts, and Spades are all androids. Each member has a playing card value, and those who rise or fall in the Gang's esteem gain or lose a "pip".

Stargirl's father Sam Kurtis was a "Two of Clubs". Upon defeating her dad, she transitioned from the Star-Spangled Kid identity to Stargirl in JSA: All-Stars.

In Infinite Crisis #2 (2005), the Joker tortures and kills the leadership of a local Spades cell of the Royal Flush Gang from an unspecified city, after being rejected by the Society for his "instability". The King is the last one left alive and he mocks the Joker for being rejected. The Joker kills the King with an electrical blast to the face. The dead gang is left in the ruins of a casino.

A new version of the Royal Flush Gang appears in Justice League of America (vol. 2) #35. This version is working under the authority of Amos Fortune, who is addressed by other members as "Wild Card". In the following issue, Fortune gives a history of the gang. It seems to combine the first and third gangs' histories/characteristics, with Fortune indicating that he was always running the group in some capacity. Ace of Spades is a man named Ernest Clay, Jack of Spades was a replacement for one that was a former gigolo, King of Spades was Joe Carny again, Queen of Spades was Mona Taylor, Six of Spades is an unnamed woman, and Ten of Spades was Wanda Wayland again.

Another cell of the expanded version, this one stylized as a street gang, appear as members of the Society in Villains United and several of its tie-ins in other comics. Ace of Spades was an unnamed buff man in sunglasses, Jack of Spades was Deuce Canyard, King of Spades was an unnamed man in a crown and sunglasses, Queen of Spades is a woman in a ponytail and sunglasses, and Ten of Spades is an unnamed orange-haired woman in sunglasses. It is unclear what ties the third gang has or had—if any—to its predecessors and successors.

A branch of the Royal Flush Gang based in Las Vegas, Nevada appeared in Zatanna #4. Rather than using a playing card motif, each member of the Vegas branch is modeled after a member of the Rat Pack, including Frank Sinatra, Sammy Davis Jr., and Dean Martin. It is unclear if there are still 52 cells throughout the country, or 52 members in total. A lower ranked member mentions that there are four Queens, but Fortune states that the group is constantly growing.

=== The New 52 ===
The Royal Flush Gang are reintroduced in "The New 52" continuity reboot, consisting of the android Ace, King of Spades, Queen of Spades, and Jack of Spades. With help from Technician, the Justice League defeated the Royal Flush Gang.

Another incarnation of the Royal Flush Gang appears in the "Forever Evil" storyline, consisting of Ace of Spades, King of Spades, Jack of Clubs, Queen of Clubs, and Ten of Clubs. The Royal Flush Gang members later appear as members of the Secret Society of Super Villains. The Royal Flush Gang confronts the Rogues and tells them to surrender in exchange for Golden Glider's life. The Rogues rescue Golden Glider and escape in an armored truck. Ace of Spades is later attacked and killed by Johnny Quick.

Another incarnation of the Royal Flush Gang attacks Superman when his identity of Clark Kent is exposed. King is an unnamed man who is the leader of the Royal Flush Gang, Queen is an unnamed woman who is the second-in-command of the Royal Flush Gang, Jack is an unnamed Man, and Ace and Ten are an unnamed sister and brother. The Royal Flush Gang are defeated by Superman and left for the police.

=== DC Rebirth ===
In 2016, DC Comics implemented a relaunch of its books called DC Rebirth, which restored its continuity to a form much as it was prior to The New 52. The Royal Flush Gang are redesigned to resemble their Batman Beyond counterparts. They are among the many villains aiming to kill Batman to stop Two-Face from revealing information. They descend on KGBeast and ask him the location of Batman and Duke Thomas. KGBeast throws a bomb onto the bottom of their playing card, presumably to take out his rivals in stopping Batman.

=== Dawn of DC ===
In the 2022-23 limited series Punchline: The Gotham Game, the Royal Flush Gang, consisting of the King and Queen of Hearts (married couple Rex and Regina Quintain), Jack, 1-0, and Bluff (son of the King and Queen of Diamonds), are taken over by Punchline and help her to manufacture and distribute her drug XO in Gotham.

== Other versions ==
Joseph Carny / King appears in Kingdom Come. This version is a member of Lex Luthor's Mankind Liberation Front and Vandal Savage's immortal protégé. Despite leaving the Royal Flush Gang, he carries a cigarette pack with playing card markings and speaks in metaphors drawn from card games.

== In other media ==
=== Television ===
==== Animation ====
- The Royal Flush Gang appears in The Super Powers Team: Galactic Guardians episode "The Wild Cards", with King voiced by Eugene Williams, Queen voiced by Arlene Golonka, Jack voiced by Jerry Houser, and Ten voiced by Lynne Moody. This version of the group were originally thieves until they were recruited by the Joker under the alias of Ace.
- Three incarnations of the Royal Flush Gang appear in series set in the DC Animated Universe (DCAU).
  - The first incarnation appears in Batman Beyond, with King voiced by George Lazenby, Queen voiced by Amanda Donohoe in the first season and Sarah Douglas in all subsequent appearances, their son Jack voiced by Scott Cleverdon in the first season and Nicholas Guest in the third season, and their daughter Melanie Walker / Ten voiced by Olivia d'Abo, while Ace is silent. This version of the group is a multi-generational crime family who use high-tech, playing card-themed weapons and an android serving as Ace. Additionally, they previously encountered Bruce Wayne as the original Batman, who nearly succeeded in disbanding the gang's predecessors. Throughout their appearances, the gang battle Batman (Terry McGinnis), who falls in love with Melanie and eventually motivates her to leave the group. Following this, the gang struggle to maintain their power and work with their employer Paxton Powers to assassinate Wayne, only to be thwarted by Batman. In the aftermath, Ace is destroyed, King and Queen are arrested, the former is revealed to have been pursuing an affair with Powers's secretary due to an inferiority complex stemming from being compared unfavorably to his late predecessor and father-in-law, and Melanie bails Jack out of jail and helps him get a job at the restaurant she works at.
  - The second incarnation appears in the Justice League episode "Wild Cards", with King voiced by Scott Menville, Queen by Tara Strong, Jack by Greg Cipes, Ten by Khary Payton, and Ace by Hynden Walch. This version of the group are Project Cadmus-trained, metahuman teenagers, with King possessing pyrokinesis, Queen metallokinesis, Jack elasticity, Ten superhuman strength, and Ace psionic abilities. The Joker finds them, turns them into his Royal Flush Gang, and pits them against the Justice League on live television while he secretly uses Ace to drive millions of viewers insane. After the Leaguers capture most of the gang, Batman discovers the Joker kept a collar that Ace's government handlers used to control her as insurance against her. An enraged Ace subsequently puts him in a catatonic state before disappearing.
  - The third incarnation appears in a flashback in the Justice League Unlimited episode "Epilogue", with Ace voiced again by Hynden Walch while the rest of the gang are silent. This version of the group was formed by a lonely and depressed Ace, who developed reality-warping powers. She used them to turn four random people into a new Royal Flush Gang to play with her, but they chose to abandon her and turned to crime. Their powers are puns based partially on their names: King is a massive head with small limbs resembling Egg Fu and Marvel Comics character MODOK who possesses a flying throne and eye beams; Queen was transformed from a man and given enhanced strength; Jack is a samurai transformed from a black man; and Ten is a woman with extendable whip-like hair evocative of Bo Derek's character from 10. While the Justice League battled the empowered criminals, Cadmus member Amanda Waller revealed that Ace was dying due to an aneurysm and a possible psychic backlash caused by her death could kill millions. Batman volunteered to kill her before that could happen and confronted her, but Ace knew he had no intent to do so. After briefly explaining her backstory to him, she asked him to keep her company until she died. Batman accepted. Ace's peaceful death harmed no one, and restored the remaining gang members to normal.
- The Royal Flush Gang appear in Batman: The Brave and the Bold, with Ace voiced by Diedrich Bader and Jack by Edoardo Ballerini while King and Queen are silent. This version of the gang are Old West bandits.
- The Royal Flush Gang appear in the DC Super Hero Girls episode "#AwesomeAuntAntiope".

==== Live-action ====
- Three incarnations of the Royal Flush Gang appear in series set in the Arrowverse:
  - The first incarnation appears in the Arrow episode "Legacies", with Derek Reston / King portrayed by Currie Graham, Kyle Reston / Ace by Kyle Schmid, Teddy Reston / Jack by Tom Stevens, and Derek's unnamed wife / Queen by Sarah-Jane Redmond. This version of the group is a family of bank robbers who wear hockey masks marked with their respective playing card. Additionally, Derek previously worked for Queen Industries before its CEO Robert Queen outsourced jobs to China and the Reston family lost their home as a result. Feeling guilty, Oliver Queen tries to persuade Derek to right his own wrongs, but is forced to stop the Restons when they attempt to rob another bank. In the ensuing confrontation, Derek is fatally shot while the rest of the family are arrested. During Derek's final moments, Oliver reveals his secret identity to him to show the former that he always had his best interests at heart. Derek admits what he did was wrong and he should not have gotten his family involved before dying in Oliver's arms.
  - Two incarnations of the Royal Flush Gang appear in The Flash.
    - The first make a non-speaking cameo appearance in the episode "The Sound and the Fury", consisting of unnamed, masked motorcycle thieves King, Queen, and Ace who are swiftly apprehended by the Flash.
    - The second appear in the eighth season, consisting of metahumans Mona Taylor / Queen (portrayed by Agam Darshi) as the group's leader with psychic abilities; King (portrayed by Ryan Jefferson Booth) who has super-strength; Jake Fox / Jack (portrayed by Eston Fung) who can shoot lasers from his eyes; and Wanda Wayland / Ten (portrayed by Megan Peta Hill) who is an expert hand-to-hand combatant.
- Sam Kurtis appears in Stargirl, portrayed by Geoff Stults. After disappearing in the pilot episode, he resurfaces in the episode "Shining Knight", ostensibly to reconnect with his daughter Courtney Whitmore, though he secretly attempts to steal her locket and sell it off for money. However, her stepfather Pat Dugan realizes Kurtis' true intentions and confronts him, telling him to never return.

=== Film ===
- The second incarnation of the Royal Flush Gang appears in Justice League: Doom, with King voiced by Jim Meskimen, Queen voiced by an uncredited Grey DeLisle, Jack voiced by an uncredited Robin Atkin Downes, Ten voiced by Juliet Landau, and Ace voiced by Bruce Timm. This version of the group have similar or altered abilities from the comics' original version. King wields an electric scepter while Queen wields cards she can throw with high strength and accuracy.
- The Batman: Beyond incarnation of the Royal Flush Gang appears in the fan film Batman Beyond: Year One, with Melanie Walker / Ten portrayed by Isabelle Hahn, Jack portrayed by Koki Tomlinson, and an unnamed member portrayed by D.Y. Sao.

=== Miscellaneous ===
- The Royal Flush Gang appears in issue #2 of the Justice League Unlimited tie-in comic book.
- The Royal Flush Gang appear in Batman: The Brave and the Bold #6.
- Kyle Reston / Ace appears in issue #23 of the Arrow tie-in comic book.
