= Batman Beyond: Year One =

2024 American superhero fan film

- Release poster
- Directed by: Michael Yu
- Screenplay by: Michael Yu
- Based on: Batman Beyond by: Paul Dini; Bruce Timm; Alan Burnett
- Produced by: Philip McElroy; Michael Yu; Erin-Elizabeth Miller
- Starring: Ryan Potter; Isabelle Hahn; Fiona Dorn; Justin Vancho; Koki Tomlinson
- Cinematography: Ian Hussey
- Edited by: Kevin Hickman
- Music by: Alexander Arntzen
- Production companies: Lumis Entertainment; M Suite Media Production
- Distributed by: YouTube
- Release date: November 16, 2024
- Running time: 14 minutes
- Country: United States
- Language: English
- Budget: $54,622

Batman Beyond: Year One is a 2024 American superhero fan film written, co-produced, and directed by Michael Yu, based on the animated series Batman Beyond. It stars Ryan Potter as Terry McGinnis / Batman, alongside Isabelle Hahn, Fiona Dorn, Justin Vancho, and Koki Tomlinson.

== Premise ==
Under the supervision of a now-retired Bruce Wayne, high schooler Terry McGinnis balances crime fighting and budding relationships in a futuristic Neo Gotham City.

== Cast ==
- Ryan Potter as Terry McGinnis / Batman
- Isabelle Hahn as Melanie Walker / Ten
- Justin Vancho as Spike
- Fiona Dorn as Dottie
- D.Y. Sao as Flush Gang Henchman
- Erin-Elizabeth Miller as Young Woman
- Koki Tomlinson as Jack Walker

An uncredited Roger Craig Smith voices Bruce Wayne. He had previously voiced the character in multiple projects.

== Production ==
In December 2023, a Batman Beyond fan film titled Batman Beyond: Year One was being developed, with Michael Yu writing, co-producing, and directing the film, with Ryan Potter cast as Terry McGinnis / Batman. Potter previously portrayed Gar Logan / Beast Boy / Changeling in the HBO Max television series Titans (2018-2023). In October 2024, during Los Angeles Comic Con, additional casting was revealed, including Isabelle Hahn as Melanie Walker, Fiona Dorn as Dottie, Justin Vancho as Spike, and Koki Tomlinson as Jack Walker, with the story taking inspiration from the pilot episode of Batman Beyond.

== Release ==
Batman Beyond: Year One was crowdfunded through Indiegogo and was released on YouTube on November 16, 2024.
