= List of Batman: The Animated Series episodes =

Batman: The Animated Series is an American television series produced by Warner Bros. Animation based on the DC Comics superhero Batman. Originally, 85 episodes aired on Fox from 1992 to 1995. A further 24 episodes were aired under the title The New Batman Adventures after the show moved to The WB. Both series have since aired together on various other networks, including Cartoon Network, Boomerang, Jetix, and The Hub. Each episode is a TV half-hour (22 minutes plus commercials).

== Series overview ==
Season	Episodes	Originally released		
Season	Episodes	First released	Last released	Network
1	65	September 5, 1992	September 17, 1993	Fox Kids
2	20	May 2, 1994	September 15, 1995	Fox Kids

== Episodes ==
Note: This article lists the episodes in their DVD release order, rather than by their original air dates, because the original air dates severely differed from production order.

=== Season 1 (1992–93) ===
- 65 episodes were produced for Season 1 because it is the minimum number of episodes necessary for a TV series to be successfully syndicated. 60 episodes were initially aired during the 1992–1993 television season from September 1992 to May 1993. The final five episodes of Season 1 were held back until September 17, 1993.
- Episodes 1 to 28 were released on DVD in the Batman: The Animated Series Volume One set, episodes 29 to 56 in the Volume Two set, and episodes 57 to 85 in the Volume Three set.

No. overall	No. in season	Title	Directed by	Written by	Original release date
1	1	"On Leather Wings"	Kevin Altieri	Mitch Brian	September 6, 1992 (primetime); September 24, 1992 (weekday)
A mysterious bat-like creature suddenly appears over Gotham City, terrorising both its residents and the city's police. Batman soon finds himself accused of being the creature itself, but the Dark Knight suspects the creature is not natural. His suspicions soon lead him to scientist Kirk Langstrom, whose research with his father-in-law has involved experiments with bats. After a giant bat-like creature attacks a security guard at Phoenix Pharmaceuticals, Batman is blamed for the incident, prompting Detective Harvey Bullock to assemble a task force to capture him, despite Commissioner Gordon's objections. Believing he has been framed, Batman investigates a series of robberies at pharmaceutical companies, recovering a recording of the creature and a mysterious fur sample. Bruce Wayne visits the Gotham City Zoo, where bat expert Dr. Robert March and his colleagues, Dr. Kirk Langstrom and his wife Francine, agree to examine the evidence. Returning to the zoo, Batman confronts Langstrom, who reveals that he developed an experimental serum intended to create a new species combining human and bat characteristics. Having tested the formula on himself, Langstrom became addicted to its effects and began stealing chemicals to sustain his transformation. Langstrom transforms into the monstrous Man-Bat and after subduing the creature, Batman takes Langstrom to the Batcave and develops an antidote, restoring him to human form before returning him to Francine. Note: Based on the comic-book story "Challenge of the Man-Bat" from Detective Comics #400 (June 1970), "Man or Bat" from Detective Comics #402 (August 1970) and "Marriage: Impossible" from Detective Comics #407 (January 1971) by writer Frank Robbins and artist Neal Adams.
2	2	"Christmas with the Joker"	Kent Butterworth	Eddie Gorodetsky	November 13, 1992 (weekday); December 27, 1992 (primetime)
On Christmas Eve, Dick wants Bruce to enjoy Christmas, but he believes there's work to do. That night, the Joker escapes from Arkham Asylum and takes over Gotham City's airwaves, announcing a Christmas special featuring Commissioner Gordon, Harvey Bullock, and Summer Gleeson as hostages. Threatening to kill them at midnight, Joker challenges Batman and Robin to find his hideout. They follow his broadcast signal to an observatory, where they narrowly escape a deadly cannon attack. After discovering a clue involving a discontinued toy, Batman realizes that Joker is hiding inside an abandoned toy factory. There, Batman and Robin battle an assortment of deadly toys and Joker's henchmen before discovering the hostages suspended above melted plastic. Batman rescues them and apprehends Joker, allowing Bruce and Dick to return to Wayne Manor to celebrate Christmas together and watch It's a Wonderful Life.
3	3	"Nothing to Fear"	Boyd Kirkland	Henry T. Gilroy and Sean Catherine Derek	September 15, 1992
Batman finds himself investigating a spate of mysterious attacks at Gotham University that have left victims suffering serious panic attacks brought on by fear. His investigation soon leads him to encounter the culprit, the Scarecrow who has been robbing the university. At the same time, Bruce Wayne is troubled by an encounter with Dr. Long, an old acquaintance of his father, who accuses Bruce of disgracing the Wayne family name. Batman learns the Scarecrow uses a powerful fear-inducing chemical that causes victims to experience hallucinations of their greatest fears. During their confrontation, Batman is exposed to the toxin and begins experiencing disturbing visions of his father, who says he is a failure. Batman eventually discovers that the Scarecrow is targeting the university out of revenge for his dismissal as a professor. Batman pursues Scarecrow aboard a fleeing blimp as his hallucinations worsen. Batman overcomes his fear, realizing he is a good hero and man. After following Scarecrow to a chemical plant, Crane becomes a victim of his own fear toxin. In the aftermath, Bruce visits his parents' graves.
4	4	"The Last Laugh"	Kevin Altieri	Carl Swenson	September 22, 1992
The Joker once more causes chaos in Gotham City by subjecting people to a cloud of laughing gas, allowing him to plunder the city while the gas's victims are left paralysed with laughter and on the verge of dying. After Bruce's butler, Alfred Pennyworth, is infected with the toxin, he becomes Batman once more to stop the Joker and his crime wave, in hopes of acquiring the means to create an antidote to save Alfred and all of Gotham. Note This is the first episode to feature Efrem Zimbalist Jr. (replacing Clive Revill) as the voice of Alfred.
5	5	"Pretty Poison"	Boyd Kirkland	Story by : Paul Dini and Michael Reaves; Teleplay by : Tom Ruegger	September 14, 1992
Bruce is surprised when his friend Harvey Dent, the city's District Attorney, announces he has become engaged to his new girlfriend Pamela Isley. After meeting her, Bruce becomes concerned when Dent suddenly collapses in the restaurant, and doctors find he has been poisoned. As Batman, he swiftly works to find the culprit involved in this and secure the antidote needed to cure Harvey, but is shocked when he learns who it is.
6	6	"The Underdwellers"	Frank Paur	Story by : Tom Ruegger; Teleplay by : Jules Dennis and Richard Mueller	October 21, 1992
A string of bizarre robberies take place across Gotham, leaving the police baffled about who is involved. Batman decides to investigate and discovers to his shock that all the robberies have involved a band of homeless children living in Gotham's sewers. Delving into the matter deeper, he soon learns the children are doing the crimes at the bidding of one person - a man calling himself the Sewer King.
7	7	"P.O.V."	Kevin Altieri	Story by : Mitch Brian; Teleplay by : Sean Catherine Derek and Laren Bright	September 18, 1992
Following a botched police operation, Officers Wilkes and Renee Montoya, along with Harvey Bullock, are questioned by Internal Affairs. All three note that Batman turned up when things went wrong, but was captured by the smugglers they were pursuing. After all three are suspended, Montoya attempts to track down where Batman was taken to bring down the smugglers' ringleader.
8	8	"The Forgotten"	Boyd Kirkland	Jules Dennis, Richard Mueller, and Sean Catherine Derek	October 8, 1992
Bruce goes undercover to investigate a spate of disappearances amongst Gotham's homeless, but is ambushed. His kidnappers not only leave him with amnesia, but also imprisoned in a chain gang mining camp. Whilst he attempts to recover his memory, Alfred, using the Batwing, attempts to track him down when he realises he is in trouble and needs his other 'suit'.
9	9	"Be a Clown"	Frank Paur	Ted Pedersen and Steve Hayes	September 16, 1992
Mayor Hamilton Hill's neglected son Jordan stows away in the truck of a clown his father hired after Hill turns his birthday party into a political gathering. Batman is forced to track him down for his father's sake, after he discovers Joker took the place of the real clown in an attempt to kill Hill for his recent insulting remarks about him in a news interview.
10	10	"Two-Face, Part 1"	Kevin Altieri	Story by : Alan Burnett; Teleplay by : Randy Rogel	September 25, 1992
Mobster Rupert Thorne attempts to prevent Harvey Dent from being a constant problem against him by finding something he can use to blackmail him. In the meantime, Dent is facing increased pressure with his re-election campaign, and slowly turns to a psychiatrist who determines that he is developing a split personality. Thorne soon learns of this and attempts to confront him over it, only to create a series of events that will change Dent for the worse.
11	11	"Two-Face, Part 2"	Kevin Altieri	Randy Rogel	September 28, 1992
Dent, now disfigured down one side of his face and lost in his split personality disorder, becomes Two-Face and starts robbing Thorne's illegal business out of revenge, using a two-headed coin to make his decisions. Batman, feeling guilty for not saving him, finds himself trying to stop his former friend before it is too late, upon learning Dent is intent on killing Thorne after humiliating him, even if his former girlfriend is placed in jeopardy.
12	12	"It's Never Too Late"	Boyd Kirkland	Story by : Tom Ruegger; Teleplay by : Garin Wolf	September 10, 1992 (weekday); January 17, 1993 (primetime)
Years ago, as a child, mob boss Arnold Stromwell was involved in an accident that cost his brother his leg. Now facing defeat in a mob war with Thorne, he is surprised when Batman intervenes on his brother's behalf to save him from himself. For the first time in his life, Stromwell is forced to see what his life of crime has done to him and face the guilt he has held for his brother's accident.
13	13	"I've Got Batman in My Basement"	Frank Paur	Sam Graham and Chris Hubbell	September 30, 1992
Amateur detective Sherman Grant and his friend Roberta find themselves coming to Batman's aid when they stumble across him pursuing the Penguin and his men for a stolen Fabergé egg. Forced to help him recover in the basement of his home from poison gas, Sherman and his friends soon have to protect him and the stolen egg from the Penguin when he comes looking for them.
14	14	"Heart of Ice"	Bruce Timm	Paul Dini	September 7, 1992
Batman investigates a series of thefts at GothCorp committed by Mr. Freeze, a mysterious criminal armed with a freezing gun, and discovers that he is assembling a massive ice cannon. After confronting Freeze during another robbery, Batman rescues an injured henchman who has been abandoned by his employer. Investigating Freeze's connection to GothCorp, Batman discovers that he is Victor Fries, a former scientist who placed his terminally ill wife Nora in cryogenic suspension until a cure could be found. When GothCorp CEO Ferris Boyle discovered the unauthorized experiment, he ordered it shut down and caused an accident that left Fries unable to survive outside freezing temperatures. Seeking revenge, Freeze attacks a humanitarian awards dinner honoring Boyle, using his cannon to encase the building in ice. Batman escapes Freeze's captivity and intervenes before he can kill Boyle, defeating him by shattering his helmet with hot soup. Batman subsequently exposes Boyle's actions and leaves Freeze imprisoned in a specially designed, snowing cell at Arkham Asylum. There, Freeze tearfully apologizes to Nora, who is memorialized in a snowglobe, for failing to avenge her, while Batman watches sympathetically. Note: This episode won the series a 1993 Daytime Emmy Award for Outstanding Writing in an Animated Program. Due to the episode's acclaim the story was adapted into the mainstream DC continuity with the one-shot Batman: Mr. Freeze (May 1997) written by Paul Dini and drawn by Mark Buckingham, becoming the defninive Mr. Freeze origin story.
15	15	"The Cat and the Claw: Part 1"	Kevin Altieri	Story by : Sean Catherine Derek and Laren Bright; Teleplay by : Jules Dennis and Richard Mueller	September 5, 1992
Bruce finds himself instantly attracted to the charms and beauty of Selina Kyle, unaware that she works as Catwoman, a cat burglar who has been hitting places across Gotham. However, she also has a fondness for all things feline, and soon becomes concerned when a terrorist group known as The Red Claw builds a base within a mountain lion sanctuary she seeks to protect.
16	16	"The Cat and the Claw: Part 2"	Dick Sebast	Story by : Sean Catherine Derek and Laren Bright; Teleplay by : Jules Dennis and Richard Mueller	September 12, 1992
Bruce is shocked to discover Selina's secret identity whilst working as Batman, but soon pairs up with her when both learn the Red Claw has serious plans for Gotham. To their horror, the pair learn the group's leader, a woman calling herself Red Claw, intends to steal a viral plague from a military train and threatens to use it to receive a hefty ransom from the city, prompting Batman and Catwoman to work together to stop this.
17	17	"See No Evil"	Dan Riba	Martin Pasko	February 24, 1993
Batman investigates a series of jewelry thefts committed by an invisible criminal. The thief is Lloyd Ventrix, Lloyd Ventrix, a con artist recently released from prison, who uses a special invisibility suit to pose as his daughter Kimberly's imaginary friend, Mojo, without his ex-wife's knowledge. Ventrix hopes to take custody of Kimberly, but Helen refuses to allow him near her. Batman traces the stolen technology to a Wayne Enterprises research project and discovers that prolonged exposure to the suit's material causes severe psychological damage. After learning that Helen plans to move away with Kimberly, Ventrix attempts to abduct his daughter, prompting Batman to intervene. Ventrix escapes in an invisible car, leading Batman on a chase through Gotham before confronting him on a rooftop. Batman ruptures a water tower, revealing Ventrix's location and allowing him to subdue him. Later, Kimberly receives a visit from Batman, who reassures her that she and her mother are safe. Kimberly's mother believes Batman to be another imaginary friend of hers.
18	18	"Beware the Gray Ghost"	Boyd Kirkland	Story by : Dennis O'Flaherty and Tom Ruegger; Teleplay by : Garin Wolf and Tom Ruegger	November 4, 1992
Simon Trent, an actor best known for his role as The Gray Ghost on television, faces bankruptcy and depression due to his declining career. Bruce was a childhood fan of Trent who loved The Gray Ghost himself. At the same time, Gotham is rocked by a string of bombings. Bruce realizes the bombings mirror a lost episode of the show, so Batman visits Trent, requesting a copy of the episode from him. Trent soon joins forces with him as the Gray Ghost. The Mad Bomber is revealed to be a toy collector, who has been bombing buildings using a toy. Batman and Gray Ghost stop him, the story brings newfound attention and success to Simon. Bruce visits him at a signing one day and has him sign his collectible. Guest Star: Adam West as the voice of Simon Trent.
19	19	"Prophecy of Doom"	Frank Paur	Story by : Dennis Marks; Teleplay by : Sean Catherine Derek	October 6, 1992
Bruce becomes suspicious of a cult a close friend has joined called the Brotherhood, founded by the "mystic" Nostromos, who claims to foresee great disasters in the future. Bruce joins the cult to investigate and finds an attempt on his life. As Batman, he swiftly identifies Nostromos as a con artist who is rigging near-fatal accidents to gain the confidence of Gotham's wealthiest citizens. He soon determines Nostromos plans to con them out of their fortune, and is forced to prevent this.
20	20	"Feat of Clay: Part 1"	Dick Sebast	Story by : Marv Wolfman and Michael Reaves; Teleplay by : Marv Wolfman	September 8, 1992
Matt Hagen, a skilled actor, is forced by Roland Daggett to help him eliminate executive Lucius Fox, so he can take over Wayne Enterprises. Hagen poses as Bruce Wayne and attempts to murder Fox. Fox survives but tells the media Bruce was behind it. Hagen is forced to receive an addictive face cream known as Renuyu, which can temporarily restore his disfigured face following a car accident years ago. Eager for more, he attempts to steal the cream until Daggett's men force-feed him the stuff as punishment, in an attempt to murder him. Batman fails to identify how Fox could pose as Wayne. Bruce visits Lucious, who is terrified of him. As Bruce is arrested, Hagen is found, alive but entirely made of clay.
21	21	"Feat of Clay: Part 2"	Kevin Altieri	Story by : Marv Wolfman and Michael Reaves; Teleplay by : Michael Reaves	September 9, 1992
Released on bail, Bruce resumes his investigation into Daggett. Meanwhile, Hagen discovers that his exposure to Renuyu has transformed him into a shapeshifting mutant capable of turning into anyone. Horrified by his condition and his acting career now over, Hagen wants to kill Daggett. He heartbrokenly tells his friend that he's no longer even a man. Batman learns that Hagen is Clayface and is seeking revenge and that Daggett intends to promote Renuyu during a TV interview with Summer Gleeson. Hagen infiltrates the studio disguised as an audience member, an older lady, and publicly confronts him. Batman intervenes and during their battle plays footage of all of Hagen's previous film roles to remind him of the man he used to be and still can be. This causes Clayface to uncontrollably shift between his former roles. Clayface seemingly dies after being electrocuted, while Daggett is arrested and the charges against Bruce are dropped. However, Batman later discovers that electricity has little effect on Clayface's substance and suspects that Hagen staged his death. Outside the hospital, Hagen's friend Teddy mourns his apparent passing, unaware that a nearby woman is Clayface in disguise.
22	22	"Joker's Favor"	Boyd Kirkland	Paul Dini	September 11, 1992 (weekday); January 31, 1993 (primetime)
Charlie Collins, a mild-mannered Gotham City accountant, encounters the Joker during a road rage incident and narrowly escapes death after promising to perform a favor for him. Two years later, Charlie has relocated to Ohio and changed his name, but Joker tracks him down and demands his assistance in attacking a testimonial dinner honoring Commissioner Gordon. Charlie reluctantly agrees but secretly alerts Batman using a makeshift Bat-Signal. At the dinner, Joker and Harley Quinn incapacitate the police with nerve gas and attach a bomb to Gordon before abandoning Charlie, leaving him to die. Batman arrives and saves Gordon, defeating the Joker's henchmen and Harley, although the Joker escapes. Charlie confronts him in an alleyway and threatens to kill them both with a stolen bomb, refusing Batman's pleas to stop. Terrified, Joker surrenders all information he has on Charlie, who reveals the bomb to be a harmless firework. Batman arrests the humiliated Joker, while Charlie happily returns to his family. Note: This episode marks the first appearance of Harley Quinn, the Joker's accomplice and love interest. Her appearance proved popular with fans of the Batman comics, later leading to her being incorporated into the comic book series as a result, along with other DC media franchises.
23	23	"Vendetta"	Frank Paur	Michael Reaves	October 5, 1992
Harvey Bullock is horrified when he is arrested for kidnapping an informant who was helping him on a case. Despite disliking him for his mistrust, Batman believes Bullock to be an honest cop who was set up. Investigating the kidnapping, he discovers the real kidnapper is Killer Croc, whom Bullock once arrested. Finding Croc harbors a vendetta against him for this, and the kidnap victim, Batman, must save them from certain death.
24	24	"Fear of Victory"	Dick Sebast	Samuel Warren Joseph	September 29, 1992
Dick Grayson is surprised when a friend of his at college suddenly has a panic attack during a football match. Later that night, Dick, working as Robin, suffers a panic attack when working with Batman. The pair investigate and discover that both he and his friend were subjected to a fear chemical invented by the Scarecrow, who has been using it to fix sporting matches in order make sizeable wagers on them.
25	25	"The Clock King"	Kevin Altieri	David Wise	September 21, 1992
Former businessman Temple Fugate, an efficiency expert calling himself the Clock King, seeks revenge on Mayor Hill during his re-election campaign. Years ago, when an attorney, Hill, advised Fugate to change his work routine for once in his life, a decision that cost him his company and his sanity. Batman discovers the Clock King is intent on not only discrediting Hill, but killing him to complete his revenge.
26	26	"Appointment in Crime Alley"	Boyd Kirkland	Gerry Conway	September 17, 1992
Daggett, once more seeking to expand his business empire, hires a pair of arsonists to help him destroy one of Gotham's poorest neighborhoods, nicknamed "Crime Alley". At the same time, Bruce is heading to the area as Batman to see Leslie Thompkins, a doctor who helped him in his youth cope with the loss of his parents, for an annual event he conducts, only to come across Daggett's scheme when Thompkins is kidnapped. Note: Based on the comic-book story "There Is No Hope in Crime Alley" from Detective Comics #457 (March 1976) by writer Dennis O'Neil and artist Dick Giordano.
27	27	"Mad as a Hatter"	Frank Paur	Paul Dini	October 12, 1992
Jervis Tetch, a scientist developing mind control devices at Wayne Industries, develops a relationship with his office secretary, Alice. But his love for her is ruined when her boyfriend reconciles with her for an earlier argument, and they become engaged. Enraged, Tetch dons the mantle of the Mad Hatter, using his mind-control devices to make Alice his, prompting Batman to stop him.
28	28	"Dreams in Darkness"	Dick Sebast	Judith and Garfield Reeves-Stevens	November 3, 1992 (weekday); December 20, 1992 (primetime)
Batman finds himself pursuing the Scarecrow, who is planning to poison Gotham's water supply with a new batch of fear toxin. But the Dark Knight becomes subjected to it and is committed to Arkham Asylum for his own safety. With his fears amplified and suffering from dark hallucinations, Batman finds he must overcome the toxin's effects, escape from Arkham, and stop Scarecrow before Gotham suffers a similar fate. Note: Loosely based on "Batman: The Last Arkham" of Batman: Shadow of the Bat #1–4 (June–September 1992) by Alan Grant, with the substitutions of Scarecrow for Victor Zsasz and Dr. Bartholomew for Jeremiah Arkham.
29	29	"Eternal Youth"	Kevin Altieri	Beth Bornstein	September 23, 1992
Bruce is surprised when he receives an invite to the Eternal Youth Health Spa, and gives it to Alfred to enjoy along with his friend Maggie. When both do not return, Bruce discovers several rich industrialists have also disappeared upon visiting the spa. Visiting the spa as Batman, he soon discovers all its guests have been turned into wooden plants by Poison Ivy, who blames their companies for destroying plant life.
30	30	"Perchance to Dream"	Boyd Kirkland	Story by : Laren Bright and Michael Reaves; Teleplay by : Joe R. Lansdale	October 19, 1992 (weekday); March 14, 1993 (primetime)
Batman is investigating a new crime when he suddenly wakes up as Bruce one morning to find his life has been completely changed. Not only are his parents still alive, but his life as Batman no longer exists, and Dick does not live with him, and Selina is engaged to him. Batman exists to fight crime, but is a separate individual. Bruce seems willing to accept this new life until reading the newspaper reveals something is deeply wrong.
31	31	"The Cape and Cowl Conspiracy"	Frank Paur	Elliot S. Maggin	October 14, 1992
Gordon requests Batman's help to track down a cache of stolen aid bonds that were taken by master trapper Josiah Wormwood. Meanwhile, Josiah is hired by his former friend Baron Jozek, who seeks revenge on Batman for humiliating him during a dinner party he was attending. Batman soon finds Josiah seeking to entrap him, claiming he can only escape certain death if he parts with his cape and cowl. Note: Based on the comic-book story "The Cape and Cowl Death Trap!" from Detective Comics #450 (August 1975) written by Elliot S. Maggin.
32	32	"Robin's Reckoning, Part 1"	Dick Sebast	Randy Rogel	February 7, 1993 (primetime); May 17, 1993 (weekday)
Batman and Robin put a stop to a group of gangsters sabotaging a construction yard as part of an extortion racket. When one of them later reveals their boss is Billy Marin, Batman orders Robin not to accompany him on the search for the culprit. Curious, Robin uses the Batcomputer to find out why, and discovers Marin is the alias of Tony Zucco, the man who killed his parents, John and Mary Grayson. Notes: The flashbacks to Robin's origin story are based on Detective Comics #38 (March 1940) by writer Bill Finger and artist Bob Kane.; This episode won the 1993 Primetime Emmy Award for Outstanding Animated Program (for Programming Less Than One Hour).
33	33	"Robin's Reckoning, Part 2"	Dick Sebast	Randy Rogel	February 14, 1993 (primetime); May 18, 1993 (weekday)
Robin, furious at Batman for his deceit, heads out into Gotham to track down Zucco, determined to get vengeance on him. Meanwhile, Batman, whilst searching for Zucco, recalls the memories he had of taking in Dick as an adopted son, helping him with his grief, and his original efforts to find Zucco. Neither he nor Robin has any idea of what will happen when they finally track Zucco down to an old amusement park.
34	34	"The Laughing Fish"	Bruce Timm	Paul Dini	January 10, 1993 (primetime); April 27, 1993 (weekday)
Joker creates a new toxin that affects only fish, mutating them with smiling faces similar to his own, before seeking to get them copyrighted so he can legally claim royalties. When Gotham's copyright offices reveal that they can't do this, Joker targets them for revenge. Batman attempts to prevent this, but when this fails, he attempts to pursue the Joker, especially when Bullock deduces his hideout. Note: This episode is based on three Batman comics, blended; "The Joker's Five-Way Revenge" from Batman #251 (September 1973) written by Dennis O'Neil with art by Neal Adams, followed by "The Laughing Fish" and "Sign of the Joker!" from Detective Comics #475–476 (February–March 1978), both by the writer Steve Englehart with art by Marshall Rogers.
35	35	"Night of the Ninja"	Kevin Altieri	Steve Perry	October 26, 1992
A mysterious ninja is targeting Wayne Enterprises, whom Batman discovers to be a disgraced martial arts student named Kyodai Ken. Years ago, Bruce and Ken trained in the same dojo under a wise sensei, until Ken tried to rob the dojo. Bruce intervened, leading to Ken being expelled for his dishonourable behaviour. Batman deduces that Ken is robbing his company as vengeance for being dishonored by him.
36	36	"Cat Scratch Fever"	Boyd Kirkland	Story by : Sean Catherine Derek; Teleplay by : Buzz Dixon	November 5, 1992
Catwoman is shocked when her pet cat Isis goes missing, and attempts to look for her. She soon learns Isis was snatched by a group led by Professor Milo, who has designed a viral plague for Daggett to help further his business interests. When the virus infects Catwoman, Batman comes to her aid, intent on finding the antidote needed to save the life of the woman who loves him.
37	37	"The Strange Secret of Bruce Wayne"	Frank Paur	Story by : David Wise; Teleplay by : Judith & Garfield Reeves-Stevens	October 29, 1992 (weekday); February 28, 1993 (primetime)
Bruce and Alfred travel to Yucca Springs resort, after a close friend, a prominent judge, is injured after thugs try to blackmail her over the contents of a mysterious tape recording. Both find the resort is run by a psychiatrist Hugo Strange, who has developed a machine that exposes a person's darkest secrets. Realizing Strange has uncovered his secret, Bruce works to sabotage his plan to auction this off to Joker, Penguin, and Two-Face. Note: Based on the comic stories "The Dead Yet Live" and "I Am the Batman!" from Detective Comics #471–472 (August–September 1977) by writer/artist Steve Englehart. Dr. Strange's scheme in this episode was also used in the plot of Batman Forever.
38	38	"Heart of Steel: Part 1"	Kevin Altieri	Brynne Stephens	November 16, 1992
Several robberies occur at major companies, including Wayne Enterprises, and Bruce Wayne, as Batman, discovers the thief is a walking mechanical briefcase. After failing to catch it, Bruce meets with his old friend Karl Rossum, a robotics expert who lost his daughter to a vehicle accident years ago. He also meets Rossum's assistant, Randa Duane, and Rossum's ultimate creation: a prototype AI known as Holographic Analytical Reciprocating Digital Computer (HARDAC). Bruce invites Duane to dinner. Around the same time, certain important members of the public start acting unlike themselves and become distant. Most surprising is when Duane unexpectedly leaves Wayne Manor while Bruce is on the phone, and the Batcave security system turns on Batman.
39	39	"Heart of Steel: Part 2"	Kevin Altieri	Brynne Stephens	November 17, 1992
Batman manages to free himself from the Batcave's security system and bring it back under his control, although he fails to track down Ms. Duane. Barbara Gordon approaches Batman to inform him of her father's sudden change in behavior. A brutal fight between Batman and Harvey Bullock ensues, during which Batman damages Bullock and discovers him to be an android, revealing that the real Bullock and James Gordon have gone missing. Batman knows who the culprit is: HARDAC. Batman must stop the evil supercomputer before it completes its replacement plan.
40	40	"If You're So Smart, Why Aren't You Rich?"	Eric Radomski	David Wise	November 18, 1992 (weekday); January 3, 1993 (primetime)
Edward Nygma creates the popular video game Riddle of the Minotaur for his employer, but his superior, Daniel Mockridge, fires him after he sues for royalties. Nygma vows revenge and adopts the identity of the Riddler. While Batman sympathizes with Nygma's grievance, he and Robin must stop the Riddler before he kills Mockridge in a life-sized version of the Minotaur maze with a working minotaur.
41	41	"Joker's Wild"	Boyd Kirkland	Paul Dini	November 19, 1992
Cameron Kaiser builds a casino hotel themed around the Joker called "The Joker's Wild". From Arkham Asylum, the Joker sees this on the news and is enraged. He escapes from Arkham again with one thought – destroying the casino – unaware that this is exactly what Kaiser wants him to do.
42	42	"Tyger Tyger"	Frank Paur	Story by : Michael Reaves and Randy Rogel; Teleplay by : Cherie Wilkerson	October 30, 1992
Selina Kyle is kidnapped by the villainous genetic engineer Emile Dorian and transformed into a humanoid cat, providing his man-cat hybrid named Tygrus with a mate. Batman attempts to rescue Selina, but is captured and used to test Dorian's greatest creation, as Tygrus hunts Batman through the island's jungles.
43	43	"Moon of the Wolf"	Dick Sebast	Len Wein	November 11, 1992
Batman investigates the appearance of a werewolf-like creature in Gotham, not realizing that the monster happens to be one of Bruce Wayne's associates — Anthony Romulus, ex-Olympic champion. Behind the scheme is twisted chemist Professor Milo. Note: Based on the comic story of the same name by Len Wein and Neal Adams from Batman #255 (April 1974).
44	44	"Day of the Samurai"	Bruce Timm	Steve Perry	February 23, 1993
Kyodai Ken kidnaps Kairi Tanaga, star pupil of Yoru-sensei, the martial arts instructor who taught both Kyodai and Bruce. The ninja's ransom for her is a scroll which reveals the location of the fabled Death Touch technique.
45	45	"Terror in the Sky"	Boyd Kirkland	Story by : Steve Perry and Mark Saraceni; Teleplay by : Mark Saraceni	November 12, 1992
When a giant bat ransacks a Gotham harbor, Batman suspects that Kirk Langstrom has recreated the forbidden Man-Bat formula and is taking it again. Kirk's wife, Francine, does not share his suspicion of her husband and leaves him. As he investigates, Batman discovers that this Man-Bat is not Kirk after all. Note: Loosely based on "Man-Bat Over Vegas," initially presented in Detective Comics #429, by writer/artist Frank Robbins, with several alterations including changes to keep the plot appropriate for the family-friendly rating of the television show.
46	46	"Almost Got 'Im"	Eric Radomski	Paul Dini	November 10, 1992
The Joker, Killer Croc, the Penguin, Two-Face, and Poison Ivy meet at a poker table, each telling a tale of a time when they almost defeated Batman. At the same time, Harley Quinn is about to kill Catwoman after she rescues Batman from the Joker's electric chair, and Batman must save her. Notes: Inspired by a four-issue story arc in Batman #291–294 (1977), entitled "Where Were You on the Night Batman Was Killed?" In each of the four issues, one of Catwoman, Riddler, and the Joker all recount their claims to have killed Batman. However, the plot for "Almost Got 'Im" is different (six stories in the show and four completely different ones in the comic book), with only the Joker as an overlapping antagonist.; Two-Face's strategy in "Almost Got 'Im" (strapping down Batman to a giant coin and flipping the coin in the air) comes from Batman #81 (February 1954). The concept of the giant penny itself originated in World's Finest Comics #30 (September 1947), in a secondary tale featuring a lesser-known villain, the Penny Plunderer.
47	47	"Birds of a Feather"	Frank Paur	Story by : Chuck Menville; Teleplay by : Brynne Stephens	February 8, 1993
Veronica Vreeland is looking for a way to create a splash with her next high society party and arrives at the idea of inviting a famous reformed criminal, the Penguin, who she finds to have comical fish-out-of-water mannerisms. Veronica convinces the Penguin to attend her party, intending him to be a laughingstock, but she begins to genuinely like him. For his part, the Penguin falls in love with her until he overhears that he is being used as the butt of a joke.
48	48	"What Is Reality?"	Dick Sebast	Marty Isenberg and Robert N. Skir	November 24, 1992 (weekday); March 7, 1993 (primetime)
Seeking to prove that he is the superior mind, the Riddler lures Batman into a riddle-solving contest inside a virtual reality game to save Commissioner Gordon's life. While solving the riddles and escaping the Riddler's traps, Batman learns that he can manipulate the virtual reality landscape much like the Riddler does.
49	49	"I Am the Night"	Boyd Kirkland	Michael Reaves	November 9, 1992 (weekday); December 13, 1992 (primetime)
On the anniversary of the death of Bruce's parents, Batman accompanies Leslie Thompkins to Crime Alley to place roses on the spot where they were gunned down. Meanwhile, Commissioner Gordon is on a stakeout to arrest Jimmy "The Jazzman" Peake during a drug smuggling operation. Batman had promised to be there, but arrived late to find the police caught in a gun battle. He helps defeat the gangsters and arrest the Jazzman, but not before Gordon is severely wounded. The incident traumatises Batman, and he contemplates giving up his crime-fighting career. However, the Jazzman has escaped prison, intending to carry out his vendetta against Gordon, who had sent him to prison six years before.
50	50	"Off Balance"	Kevin Altieri	Len Wein	November 23, 1992
While following Count Vertigo's trail, Batman encounters Talia al Ghul, the daughter of the head of the Society of Shadows, who was sent by her father Ra's al Ghul to prevent the capture of a sonic drill that the Count stole. After his identity is accidentally revealed to Talia, Batman is unsure as to where her true loyalties lie. Note: This episode is a direct adaptation of "Into the Den of the Death-Dealers" from Detective Comics #411 (May 1971) by writer Dennis O'Neil with art by Bob Brown.
51	51	"The Man Who Killed Batman"	Bruce Timm	Paul Dini	February 1, 1993
When small-time gang member Sidney "Sid the Squid" Debris seemingly kills Batman by accident, his newfound reputation vaults him into the upper stratum of the criminal element in Gotham. He meets the Joker and Rupert Thorne, neither of whom believes his claim that everything happened by pure luck. Sidney soon begins to realise that his reputation is a greater liability than an asset.
52	52	"Mudslide"	Eric Radomski	Story by : Alan Burnett; Teleplay by : Steve Perry	September 15, 1993
Clayface's body is no longer stable and rapidly falling apart. A scientist he knew from his movie star days is working on a remedy, but Hagen is forced to steal money to pay for the expensive components of the remedy, and one of his targets is Wayne Biomedical Labs.
53	53	"Paging the Crime Doctor"	Frank Paur	Story by : Mike W. Barr and Laren Bright; Teleplay by : Randy Rogel & Martin Pasko	September 17, 1993
Matthew Thorne, a doctor who lost his medical license and was subsequently forced into becoming the "crime doctor" by his older brother, crime boss Rupert Thorne, must perform delicate surgery on Rupert. He can't do it alone and kidnaps Leslie Thompkins to assist. Batman discovers Leslie's disappearance and rushes to track her down – and has an additional interest in Matthew because he was a medical school classmate of Bruce Wayne's father, Thomas.
54	54	"Zatanna"	Dick Sebast and Dan Riba	Paul Dini	February 2, 1993
When the glamorous magician Zatanna is framed for a robbery during her act, Batman swings to her defense. Zatanna is grateful, though a little puzzled, by Batman's commitment to proving her innocence. Still, the two heroes unite and use the skills her father Zatara taught them to expose and combat the culprit: an evil illusionist named Montague Kane.
55	55	"The Mechanic"	Kevin Altieri	Story by : Steve Perry and Laren Bright; Teleplay by : Randy Rogel	January 24, 1993
Thanks to an accident during a high-speed chase, the Batmobile is virtually demolished. When Batman takes the car to his mechanic, Earl Cooper, the Penguin discovers the repair shop and tampers with the Batmobile, putting it under his control. Note: The Penguin's scheme in this episode was adapted from a part of the plot for the film Batman Returns.
56	56	"Harley and Ivy"	Boyd Kirkland	Paul Dini	January 18, 1993
When the Joker fires Harley for her incompetence, she tries going on a crime spree of her own, joining up with Poison Ivy, and the two become Gotham's Queens of Crime, much to the Joker's displeasure.
57	57	"Shadow of the Bat: Part 1"	Frank Paur	Brynne Stephens	September 13, 1993
When Commissioner Gordon is framed with allegations of taking bribes from Rupert Thorne, his daughter Barbara pleads with Batman to attend a rally on the commissioner's behalf. But when Batman disappears after finding the person behind the frame-up, Barbara takes the law into her hands as Batgirl.
58	58	"Shadow of the Bat: Part 2"	Frank Paur	Brynne Stephens	September 14, 1993
Robin discovers that Gil Mason is in league with the underworld and goes to investigate him. He encounters Batgirl, and together they learn that Mason is working with Two-Face to take out Gordon and have Batman (as Matches Malone) captured.
59	59	"Blind as a Bat"	Dan Riba	Story by : Mike Underwood and Len Wein; Teleplay by : Len Wein	February 22, 1993
The Penguin steals an experimental helicopter from an air show, causing an explosion that temporarily blinds Bruce Wayne. Batman knows he won't be able to wait until his vision returns to apprehend the Penguin, and builds a high-tech visor to grant him a limited form of vision.
60	60	"The Demon's Quest: Part 1"	Kevin Altieri	Dennis O'Neil	May 3, 1993
Talia al Ghul and Robin are both kidnapped, forcing Batman and Ra's al Ghul into an uneasy truce to rescue them. Note: A direct adaptation of "Daughter of the Demon" from Batman #232 (June 1971) and "The Demon Lives Again" from Batman #244 (September 1972), both by Dennis O'Neil and Neal Adams.
61	61	"The Demon's Quest: Part 2"	Kevin Altieri	Story by : Dennis O'Neil and Len Wein; Teleplay by : Len Wein	May 4, 1993
After freeing Talia from her father's clutches and escaping from an avalanche, Batman and Robin follow their only clue – the word "Orpheus". After discovering that "Orpheus" is Al Ghul's private satellite that passes over the Sahara, the duo travels to his desert stronghold. There, Batman learns that Al Ghul is planning to detonate bombs in Lazarus Pits throughout the world, killing billions of people in an attempt to restore natural balance. Note: A direct adaptation of "Daughter of the Demon" from Batman #232 (June 1971) and "The Demon Lives Again" from Batman #244 (September 1972) by Dennis O'Neil and Neal Adams.
62	62	"His Silicon Soul"	Boyd Kirkland	Marty Isenberg and Robert N. Skir	November 20, 1992
When a robotic Batman impersonator appears in Gotham City, the real Batman deduces that Karl Rossum (from "Heart of Steel") is involved and confronts the inventor of HARDAC, who knows nothing of any surviving robots produced by the supercomputer. After the robotic Batman experiences an identity crisis and realises it is not the real Batman, its programming takesover and it begins restoring HARDAC's program so the computer can resume its campaign to replace humans with robots.
63	63	"Fire from Olympus"	Dan Riba	Story by : Paul Dini; Teleplay by : Judith & Garfield Reeves-Stevens	May 24, 1993
Believing himself to be the reincarnation of Zeus, Maximillian Zeus steals an experimental electric cannon, planning to use it to rule from his skyscraper, "Mount Olympus", high above Gotham City.
64	64	"Read My Lips"	Boyd Kirkland	Story by : Alan Burnett and Michael Reaves; Teleplay by : Joe R. Lansdale	May 10, 1993
A new gang has made its debut by committing slickly-executed crimes masterminded by gang leader Scarface, but Scarface turns out to be a puppet handled by his "dummy", the Ventriloquist.
65	65	"The Worry Men"	Frank Paur	Paul Dini	September 16, 1993
Wealthy socialite Veronica Vreeland returns from Central America, bringing tiny handmade dolls for all her friends. According to native legend, once placed under a pillow, the dolls do the sleeper's worrying for them. However, they are actually made by the Mad Hatter and contain small, mind-controlling microchips.

=== Season 2 (1994–95) ===
Due to the show's success, the Fox network executives ordered a second season of 20 more episodes while the 65 episodes of the first season were still airing. Season 2 featured Robin more prominently; eleven of the 20 episodes were given the onscreen title The Adventures of Batman & Robin.

After airing five of the 20 episodes in May 1994, the network reduced the series to airing only weekly on Saturday mornings. Ten more episodes were broadcast in this format in September–November 1994 under the Adventures of Batman & Robin title. Once these fifteen episodes had premiered (the final five were held back until September 1995), the weekday slot was restored to include reruns of the entire series. All previous episodes were shown under the new title for all remaining airings on Fox, as well as several VHS releases.

The entirety of Season 2 was released on DVD as part of the Batman: The Animated Series Volume Three set alongside the final nine episodes of Season 1.

No. overall	No. in season	Title	Directed by	Written by	Original release date
66	1	"Sideshow"	Boyd Kirkland	Story by : Michael Reaves; Teleplay by : Michael Reaves and Brynne Stephens	May 3, 1994
En route to an upstate prison, Killer Croc escapes and leads Batman on a dangerous chase through the wilderness. After throwing Batman temporarily off his trail, the reptile-man takes refuge with a group of retired circus freaks and befriends them under false pretenses. When Batman arrives, Croc and the performers band together to capture him. Note: Loosely based on "A Vow from the Grave", from Detective Comics #410 (April 1971), by writer Dennis O'Neil and artist Neal Adams. This episode adapted the comic book story with the inclusion of a separate Killer Croc story.
67	2	"A Bullet for Bullock"	Frank Paur	Michael Reaves	September 14, 1995
Someone has put a hit out on Gotham's toughest cop, Harvey Bullock. After surviving several near hits, Bullock realizes he has no choice but to ask his arch-rival Batman to help him discover who is behind the murder attempts. During their investigation, Bullock learns that his gruff and mean-spirited manner has created enemies in the unlikeliest people. Notes: Based on the comic of the same name from Detective Comics #651 (October 1992), by writer Chuck Dixon and artist Graham Nolan.; This episode won the 1996 Daytime Emmy Award for Outstanding Music Direction and Composition.
68	3	"Trial"	Dan Riba	Story by : Paul Dini and Bruce Timm; Teleplay by : Paul Dini	May 16, 1994
Gotham's new district attorney Janet Van Dorn is no fan of vigilante Batman, but both end up captured by Batman's rogues gallery after a prison riot in Arkham Asylum. They are then put on trial by the Joker (judge) and Two-Face (prosecutor) with the Ventriloquist as bailiff and a plainly biased jury of Poison Ivy, Harley Quinn, the Mad Hatter, Killer Croc, the Scarecrow, and the Riddler. Though clearly a kangaroo trial, Van Dorn is told that if she serves as Batman's defense attorney and proves that Batman is not the cause of these villains' criminal behavior, they will both be set free. But the villains have little intention of following through on their deal. Note: Based on the "Hothouse" story from Batman: Legends of the Dark Knight #42–43 (February–March 1993) and by writer John Francis Moore and artist P. Craig Russell.
69	4	"Avatar"	Kevin Altieri	Michael Reaves	May 9, 1994
Ra's al Ghul steals a mystic Egyptian scroll donated to the Gotham Museum by Bruce Wayne. Batman and Talia must join forces to prevent her mentally unstable father from unlocking the scroll's mystic secrets of life and death. Their quest takes them to a hidden temple deep beneath the Egyptian desert where Batman battles an ancient sorceress.
70	5	"House & Garden"	Boyd Kirkland	Paul Dini	May 2, 1994
Poison Ivy has not only been released from Arkham Asylum but has also married her doctor and settled down to help him raise his two sons. It would appear that Ivy has gone straight and that her old days as a criminal are over, but wealthy bachelors are being struck down by an unknown toxin, leaving Batman questioning Ivy's innocence.
71	6	"The Terrible Trio"	Frank Paur	Story by : Alan Burnett and Michael Reaves; Teleplay by : Michael Reaves	September 11, 1995
Three wealthy, bored youths seek new thrills by becoming master criminals. As animal-themed robbers Fox, Shark, and Vulture (masters of land, sea, and air), the Terrible Trio pick Gotham clean until they come to the attention of Batman.
72	7	"Harlequinade"	Kevin Altieri	Paul Dini	May 23, 1994
The Joker steals an atomic bomb and it is up to Batman and Robin to find and stop him, with Harley Quinn's help.
73	8	"Time Out of Joint"	Dan Riba	Story by : Alan Burnett; Teleplay by : Steve Perry	October 8, 1994
The Clock King returns to continue his vendetta against Mayor Hill. This time, the time-obsessed criminal hopes to murder Hill with the help of a stolen invention that allows him to warp time and travel at super speed. Securing a second device from its creator, Batman and Robin take on the Clock King in a high-speed battle for the mayor's life.
74	9	"Catwalk"	Boyd Kirkland	Paul Dini	September 13, 1995
Anxious to take up her old ways as Catwoman, Selina Kyle joins the Ventriloquist to humiliate Veronica Vreeland. But the real victim is Catwoman herself, who Scarface has secretly set up to take the fall for another robbery.
75	10	"Bane"	Kevin Altieri	Mitch Brian	September 10, 1994
Batman comes face-to-face with his most powerful adversary yet: the chemically-enhanced assassin Bane. Originally hired by Rupert Thorne to kill Batman, Bane plans to control Thorne's criminal empire once Batman is destroyed. Note: This episode is a loose adaptation of "Batman: Knightfall" (April 1993–August 1994).
76	11	"Baby-Doll"	Dan Riba	Paul Dini	October 1, 1994
A washed-up actress named Mary Louise Dahl has become bitter and insane after falling into obscurity and having a condition that prevents her body from growing to adulthood. She kidnaps her former co-stars, resentful of their continued success, and holds them prisoner on the abandoned stage of her old show. While Robin works fast to free the actors from Mary's explosive death trap, Batman pursues her through a deadly carnival funhouse.
77	12	"The Lion and the Unicorn"	Boyd Kirkland	Diane Duane, Peter Morwood and Steve Perry	September 15, 1995
The Red Claw organization kidnaps Alfred, seeking a code for arming a weapon of mass destruction that he knows from his days as a British secret agent.
78	13	"Showdown"	Kevin Altieri	Story by : Kevin Altieri, Paul Dini and Bruce Timm; Teleplay by : Joe R. Lansdale	September 12, 1995
Ra's al Ghul remembers a time in his past (the Wild West of the 1880s) in which Jonah Hex stopped him and his son Arkady Duvall's plan to destroy the transcontinental railroad using a war blimp. Note: This was Elizabeth Montgomery's final role before her death on May 18, 1995.
79	14	"Riddler's Reform"	Dan Riba	Story by : Alan Burnett, Paul Dini and Randy Rogel; Teleplay by : Randy Rogel	September 24, 1994
Vowing to turn over a new leaf, the Riddler is hired to work for a toy company. But Batman suspects that the Riddler is still obsessed with outsmarting and defeating him.
80	15	"Second Chance"	Boyd Kirkland	Story by : Paul Dini and Michael Reaves; Teleplay by : Gerry Conway	September 17, 1994
Just before Harvey Dent is to undergo surgery to fix the damage to his face in the hopes that it will give him the mental stability needed to erase his Two-Face persona, he is kidnapped by a gang with an unknown leader. Batman and Robin split up to find who abducted Bruce Wayne's old friend, suspecting that the Penguin or Rupert Thorne may be behind the kidnapping.
81	16	"Harley's Holiday"	Kevin Altieri	Paul Dini	October 15, 1994
Harley Quinn is released back into society after being given a clean bill of mental health by Arkham Asylum. However, a misunderstanding at a clothing store leads to her returning to crime. Batman and Robin attempt to help her before she lands herself back in confinement.
82	17	"Lock-Up"	Dan Riba	Story by : Paul Dini; Teleplay by : Marty Isenberg and Robert N. Skir	November 19, 1994
Lyle Bolton, the new head of security at Arkham, is fired for his atrocious mistreatment of the inmates. Six months later, Bolton becomes the vigilante Lock-Up and decides to put behind bars those who he feels are responsible for the city's ruin.
83	18	"Make 'Em Laugh"	Boyd Kirkland	Paul Dini and Randy Rogel	November 5, 1994
Using microchips stolen from the Mad Hatter, the Joker brainwashes famous comedians into committing crimes to ruin their reputations. The comedians had served as the judges who tossed the Joker out of the Gotham Comedy Competition the year before, and the Clown Prince of Crime wants revenge.
84	19	"Deep Freeze"	Kevin Altieri	Story by : Paul Dini and Bruce Timm; Teleplay by : Paul Dini	November 26, 1994
Mr. Freeze is sprung from Arkham by aging billionaire Grant Walker, who is looking to replicate his immortality. Batman and Robin infiltrate the billionaire's underwater city and combat both high-tech robots and Mr. Freeze himself, who has decided to do Walker's bidding and cover the Earth in a new ice age.
85	20	"Batgirl Returns"	Dan Riba	Michael Reaves and Brynne Stephens	November 12, 1994
While Bruce is in Europe on a Wayne Enterprises business trip, the theft of a jade cat statue occurs at Gotham State University. Barbara Gordon investigates as Batgirl, only to run into Catwoman, who claims she is also investigating and that the theft was not her style. The two team up to find the statue, with Robin tailing them, and Roland Daggett is revealed to be involved.

== See also ==
- The New Batman Adventures
- Batman: Mask of the Phantasm
- Batman & Mr. Freeze: SubZero
- Batman Beyond: Return of the Joker
- Batman: Mystery of the Batwoman
