= Heart of Ice =

- Batman: The Animated Series episode
- Episode no.: Season 1 Episode 14
- Directed by: Bruce Timm
- Written by: Paul Dini
- Based on: Batman by Bob Kane (credited) and Bill Finger (uncredited)
- Original air date: September 7, 1992

Guest appearances
- Michael Ansara as Dr. Victor Fries / Mr. Freeze; Mari Devon as Summer Gleeson; Mark Hamill as Ferris Boyle

Episode chronology
← Previous "I've Got Batman in My Basement"	Next → "The Cat and the Claw: Part 1"

"Heart of Ice" is the fourteenth episode of the first season of American animated television series Batman: The Animated Series, first aired on September 7, 1992, written by Paul Dini, and directed by Bruce Timm. This episode features the first appearance in the series of Mr. Freeze. In the comics, Freeze first appeared as “Mr. Zero” in Batman #121 in February 1959, with this episode providing a complete overhaul of his character, going from a gimmick-based villain of little regard to a nuanced tragic villain. The episode also introduces Freeze's wife Nora Fries and his motivation to find a cure for her terminal illness, both of which were later carried over to the comic books. The episode begins a four-episode and one film story arc for Freeze that continues in "Deep Freeze", the feature film Batman & Mr. Freeze: SubZero, The New Batman Adventures episode "Cold Comfort" and is concluded in the Batman Beyond episode "Meltdown".

"Heart of Ice" is one of the most acclaimed episodes of the series, and won a Daytime Emmy Award for Outstanding Writing in an Animated Program.

== Plot ==
Mr. Freeze, as he appears in the episode

Batman follows a strange trail of heists at various GothCorp offices, all by the same man: Mr. Freeze, a strange individual clad in a powerful suit and armed with a "freezing gun", a weapon that fires a beam capable of freezing anything into sheets of ice. Batman pieces together the stolen items and discovers that Freeze is building a massive ice cannon that is nearly complete, save for a single vital piece of equipment from GothCorp. Acting rapidly, he arrives at the GothCorp offices in time to engage Freeze, only to be partially frozen by him. As Freeze and his henchmen escape, he orders they leave behind one of their own, his legs accidentally frozen by Freeze's weapon. Batman chooses to help the man rather than chase Freeze.

After using a special chemical bath to revive the man, Batman (who has himself developed a cold from the encounter) visits GothCorp CEO Ferris Boyle as Bruce Wayne, hoping to learn who might have a grudge against the company. Boyle says the only person he can think of is dead: a former employee and research scientist whose funding was cut. He apparently died in a laboratory accident. Later that night, during a dinner where Boyle is to be presented with a humanitarian prize, Batman sneaks into the GothCorp security offices, and finds a tape from the accident. It is a recording of an experiment conducted by cryogenics scientist Victor Fries. He has placed his terminally ill wife Nora in cryogenic stasis until he can find a cure for her condition. Boyle arrives and orders the experiment to be ended, correctly claiming it is unauthorized and draining his company's funds, confirming Victor was indeed stealing. However, Boyle callously ignores Fries' warning that turning off the equipment would sentence Nora to death, and in the ensuing scuffle kicks Fries into a table of cryonic chemicals. As Batman watches the tape, Freeze (now revealed to be Fries himself having survived the accident) sneaks up behind him and captures him with his cold gun. Freeze confirms to Batman that the accident left him unable to live outside of sub-zero conditions. Batman tries to reason with Freeze over how Freeze intends to destroy the man who ruined his life, even if anyone else gets killed in the process, but Freeze refuses to give up his plan.

Leaving Batman, Freeze arrives with his completed cannon at the humanitarian prize dinner. He fires the immense weapon at the building, slowly freezing it from bottom to top. After Batman escapes from captivity and attacks the cannon, Freeze kicks open a fire hydrant and freezes the water to get to the floor where Boyle is. Once there, he freezes Boyle from the waist down before Batman intervenes. Freeze ends up overpowering Batman until he takes a thermos filled with hot chicken soup (which Alfred had provided for his cold) and breaks it on Freeze's helmet to shatter it and induce thermal shock. Afterwards, Batman hands over the tape with the evidence of Boyle's crimes to Summer Gleeson, and leaves the still half-frozen Boyle with a disgusted sneer — "Goodnight... humanitarian."

Freeze is taken to Arkham Asylum and put in a sub-zero cell designed to hold him. The episode ends with Freeze tearfully gazing at a music box of Nora and begging her forgiveness for, in his wrongfully revenge-driven mind, failing to avenge her, while Batman watches sympathetically from outside.

== Voice cast ==
- Kevin Conroy as Bruce Wayne / Batman
- Efrem Zimbalist Jr. as Alfred Pennyworth
- Michael Ansara as Dr. Victor Fries / Mr. Freeze
- Mari Devon as Summer Gleeson
- Mark Hamill as Ferris Boyle

=== Additional voices ===
- Michael Bell
- Robert David Hall
- John Mariano

== Production ==
This is the first episode of Batman: The Animated Series directed by Bruce Timm and written by Paul Dini. During the show's development, Timm, Dini and Mitch Brian discussed revamping certain Batman villains and Mr. Freeze came up. Timm suddenly had an idea that "Freeze gets critically wounded when his cryogenics experiment goes awry. From that point on, he considers himself 'dead,' dead to emotions, dead to humanity, literally 'cold as ice,' inside as well as out". The team decided to make a character generally disliked by comic fans into an impactful villain, "a character who was as emotionally cold as he was physically". As Dini wrote the script, he came up with the image of a weeping Freeze in his cell, with his tears freezing and turning into snowflakes, and decided that the best way to create the character's motivations was to make it emotionally charged, in a way that Timm described that "combined my 'dead, cold, emotionless' Freeze with his 'bleeding heart' Freeze". While originally planned for the episode's ending, the scene of the crying wound up not appearing, and Timm and Dini mentioned that if they could go back and do any episode again, they would do "Heart of Ice" and would include this. It was, however, used in the film Batman & Robin (1997).

Timm first thought of Anthony Hopkins and Anthony Zerbe to play Mr. Freeze, but later came up with Michael Ansara to voice the character. Ansara initially clashed with Timm, who wanted Freeze to sound like a robot, without showing any emotion; Ansara said that this would make the character sound too flat. He eventually found the right voice, however.

Batman says "My God!" while watching the tape, which was unusual in a cartoon, as the censors considered any mention of religion or any expletive inappropriate. Timm mentioned on the DVD commentary for the episode that he considers it strange they never caught it. When Toon Disney aired this episode, the network removed the phrase. They also removed Freeze's line, "I'd kill for that."

The police officer in the scene which introduces Mr. Freeze was voiced by Bob Hastings, who voiced Commissioner Gordon. Mark Hamill, who voiced Ferris Boyle, later made the first of many appearances as the Joker in the DC Animated Universe (DCAU). He originally got the role of Boyle and offered to play one of the villains. When Tim Curry dropped out of the role of the Joker, Hamill got the part.

== Legacy ==
In February 2002, to celebrate the tenth anniversary of Batman: The Animated Series, polls were held at the website The World's Finest to determine the best episode of the show. "Heart of Ice" was the winner and so received its own subsite, complete with exclusive comments on the episode provided by Bruce Timm, Paul Dini, and other officials behind the show. In 2005, Wizard Magazine selected this episode as the best of the series.

This episode is widely considered the best individual episode of Batman: The Animated Series. Some fans considered the execution for "Heart of Ice" to be "nearly flawless," with both comic and animation fans appreciating the revamp of Mr. Freeze. This episode provided such a burst in the popularity of the character that his comics' counterpart had his origins retconned to more closely resemble this episode. This brought about his resurrection in the comics and introduced Nora Fries to the comics as well, with the one shot Batman: Mr. Freeze written by Paul Dini and illustrated by Mark Buckingham. His origin was also used in the 1997 film Batman & Robin, which featured Freeze as one of its primary villains.

The episode was included among the extra features of the two-disc and Blu-ray editions of the film Batman: Gotham Knight.

The plot and premise of the episode are integrated into Mr. Freeze's origin in the 2011 video game Batman: Arkham City (also written by Paul Dini) - in one of his interview tapes with Hugo Strange, Freeze recounts the events that led him to become a supervillain and the story closely resembles the episode. The 2014 Batman: Arkham Origins DLC campaign "Cold, Cold Heart" incorporated several elements of "Heart of Ice" like Ferris Boyle.

In Injustice 2, Mr. Freeze (who is a special skin of fellow ice villain Captain Cold) alludes heavily to the episode, mentioning how he misses being able to feel and also how determined he is to cure Nora's condition.

The Harley Quinn episode "Thawing Hearts" is heavily influenced to the episode, with Mr. Freeze trying to find a cure for Nora. After Harley Quinn accidentally unfreezes Nora, Freeze forces Harley to help him. Poison Ivy successfully finds a cure, but reveals that due to Nora's rare blood type, someone else has to take it and give Nora a blood transfusion, which will kill them. Freeze willingly sacrifices himself to revive Nora.
