= Nora Fries =

Fictional character

- Nora Fries with Mr. Freeze as seen on the cover art of Detective Comics #1014 (October 2019). Art by Doug Mahnke.

Publication information
- Publisher: DC Comics
- First appearance: As Nora: Batman: The Animated Series: "Heart of Ice"; First comic appearance: Batman: Mr. Freeze (May 1997); As Lazara: Batgirl #70 (January 2006); As Mrs. Freeze: Detective Comics #1014 (October 2019)
- Created by: As Nora: Paul Dini (writer); Bruce Timm (artist); As Lazara: Andersen Gabrych (writer); Pop Mhan (artist); As Mrs. Freeze: Peter J. Tomasi (writer); Doug Mahnke (artist)

In-story information
- Species: Homo magi (current); Human (originally)
- Partnerships: Mr. Freeze
- Notable aliases: Lazara; Mrs. Freeze
- Abilities: As Lazara: Resurrection; Pyrokinesis; As Mrs. Freeze: Cold adaptation; Cryokinesis

Nora Fries is a character appearing in American comic books published by DC Comics. She was created by Paul Dini and Bruce Timm for Batman: The Animated Series, in which she is depicted as the terminally ill wife of Dr. Victor Fries, who cryogenically freezes her and becomes the supervillain Mr. Freeze to find a cure for her condition. Nora is later adapted into the mainstream comic book canon and revived as a supervillain under the aliases Lazara and Mrs. Freeze.

Nora Fries made her live-action debut in the 1997 film Batman & Robin, portrayed by Vendela Kirsebom. She has also appeared in the second season of Gotham, portrayed by Kristen Hager; the 2018 Arrowverse crossover event Elseworlds, portrayed by Cassandra Jean Amell; and Batwoman, portrayed by Jennifer Higgin.

== Fictional character biography ==
=== DC Animated Universe ===
Nora's origin is in the episode "Heart of Ice", where she only appears as a cameo. In backstory revealed in the episode, Nora was married to Victor Fries, a GothCorp cryogenics researcher, but was diagnosed with a terminal illness. Victor resorts to cryogenically freezing Nora until he can devise a cure. However, GothCorp CEO Ferris Boyle, seeing the project as a waste of money, attempts to personally shut down Nora's life support; the resulting struggle exposes Victor to chemicals that render him unable to survive outside subzero temperatures. Designing a suit and weaponry, Victor swears to avenge Nora and would have murdered Boyle had Batman not intervened.

While she was left as presumed dead in "Heart of Ice", later events would bring her back. In the film Batman & Mr. Freeze: SubZero, Victor is shown to have transferred Nora to a remote cave in the Arctic. A submarine crew accidentally damages her chamber. Victor murders the crew before bribing an old colleague into helping him kidnap Barbara Gordon so he can extract her organ via an Allograft procedure (it is unspecified which organ but is hinted to be a vital one in which the donor will not live, presumably the heart) to keep Nora alive. Batman intervenes and rescues Gordon, and Nora is eventually cured by Dr. Lyle Johnston of Wayne Enterprises.

In The New Batman Adventures episode "Cold Comfort", Nora is said to have waited for the presumed dead Victor for some time before eventually marrying her doctor Francis D'Anjou. This subplot is expanded upon in volume two of The Batman Adventures tie-in comic series, in which D'Anjou stages his abduction and death to frame Victor and make Nora hate him. After D'Anjou is defeated and arrested by Nightwing, Nora reunites with Victor in the Arctic Circle, revealing she never truly loved D'Anjou, but their reunion is cut short when Victor is seemingly killed fighting Batman after his head falls into the ocean. After talking to the incarcerated D'Anjou and Victor's adoptive Inuit son Koonak, Nora returns to the Arctic Circle to find her husband's remains. In the sequel comic series Batman: The Adventures Continue, Nora dies after her terminal illness returns.

=== Comic books ===
Freeze helps Nyssa al Ghul by creating a machine for the Society that can also be used to capture Batgirl. In return, Nyssa has offered to help him restore his wife using the Lazarus Pit. Though Nyssa has told him the pit needs to be adjusted for Nora, Batgirl convinces Freeze that Nyssa has no intention of reviving her at all, and he throws Nora into the pit himself.

Because of all the years of being altered and broken, Nora absorbs the pit's alchemy, acquiring the powers to conjure flame and reanimate the dead. She becomes a supervillainess, calling herself Lazara. Mr. Freeze manages to stop her by freezing her once again.

In The New 52 continuity reboot, Nora is not romantically involved with Victor, but is instead a young woman who, because of a terminal heart condition, was cryogenically preserved in the 1940s by Wayne Enterprises. Victor initially works on a cure out of scientific curiosity but eventually grows obsessed with Nora, conjuring up a false image of them together in his head. When Bruce Wayne orders security to remove him from Nora's presence, a fight breaks out and Victor is exposed to his own cryogenic chemicals, turning him into Freeze.

In DC Rebirth, Nora's history is retconned to be similar to her original depiction. She was the wife of Victor Fries (having a career as a talented ballerina) but discovered she had incurable cancer. It is also revealed that Victor is indirectly responsible for his wife's predicament: she had asked him for hospice care so she could live out her final years in peace, but he instead sedated and forcibly subjected her to cryogenic preservation.

In Year of the Villain, Victor revives Nora with a treatment Lex Luthor devised; in the process, Nora develops the same altered physiology as her husband; after he creates a suit and weapon similar to his own for her to use, she assumes the mantle of Mrs. Freeze. The two set out on a lengthy criminal spree across Gotham, but Nora ultimately abandons Victor to freely indulge in her growing addiction to supervillainy.

== Other versions ==
An alternate universe version of Nora Fries appears in the DC Graphic Novels for Young Adults novel, Victor and Nora: A Gotham Love Story, written by Lauren Myracle and with art by Isaac Goodhart, released in November 2020. This version's full maiden name is Elinor Grace Faria.

== Powers and abilities ==
In the continuities where she became Lazara, Nora possesses the ability to produce fire and raise the dead.

In the continuities where she became Mrs. Freeze, she shares her husband's inability to survive outside of sub-zero temperatures.

== In other media ==
=== Television ===
- Nora Fries appears in a photograph depicted in The Batman episode "The Big Chill".
- Nora Fries appears in the second season of Gotham, portrayed by Kristen Hager. Upon discovering her husband Victor is cryogenically freezing human subjects in his attempts to cure her terminal illness, Nora is taken into Jim Gordon and Harvey Bullock's custody before becoming a patient of Leslie Thompkins. Victor kidnaps Nora and Thompkins and attempts to perform a cryogenic treatment on the former that he believes will save her. However, Nora sabotages the experiment and allows the chemicals to kill her as she refuses to live in a world where Victor is either dead or in prison.
- Nora Fries appears in TV series set in the Arrowverse, portrayed by Cassandra Jean as a young woman and by Jennifer Higgin as an old woman:
  - First appearing in "Elseworlds", this version is an Arkham Asylum inmate who is released from her cryostasis after John Deegan causes a mass breakout. While looking for a way to get her body temperature back to 196 degrees below zero, she fights Killer Frost before Oliver Queen forces her to retreat.
  - Nora returns in Batwoman. After receiving a cure for her disease and apparently losing Victor, she became an old woman and came into the care of her sister Dora Smitty (portrayed by June B. Wilde).
- Nora Fries appears in Harley Quinn, voiced by Rachel Dratch. In the episode "Thawing Hearts", Mr. Freeze forces Harley Quinn and her crew to create a cure for Nora. Poison Ivy successfully does so, but reveals that due to Nora's rare blood type, someone else has to take it and give Nora a blood transfusion, which will kill them. Freeze willingly sacrifices himself to revive Nora. From the episode "Bachelorette" onwards, Nora becomes a wild, promiscuous party animal, having affairs with Maxie Zeus, Swamp Thing, and Captain Cold, as she attempts to make up for the time she spent being frozen. In the fourth season, she joins the Legion of Doom as Ivy's assistant.

=== Film ===
Nora Fries appears in Batman & Robin, portrayed by Vendela Kirsebom. This version suffers from an advanced form of the fictional illness, MacGregor's Syndrome. In the course of the film, it is discovered that Alfred is also suffering from MacGregor's Syndrome; Nora's disease is at Stage Four, but Alfred's condition is only Stage One, and Freeze's research has allowed himn to cure Stage One and make progress on a cure for Stage Two where no other researchers are even close. Poison Ivy attempts to kill Nora by disconnecting her cryogenic tube so that she can manipulate Mr Freeze to assist in her plans of global destruction, but Batman is able to reconnect the power. After asking Freeze to share with him the cure for Stage One, Batman assures Freeze that his wife will be moved to the labs at Arkham Asylum so that Freeze can continue his research while in captivity.

=== Video games ===
Nora Fries appears in Batman: The Enemy Within. This version's body is kept in the Pact's hideout, of which her husband Mr. Freeze is a member.

==== Batman: Arkham ====
Nora Fries appears in the Batman: Arkham franchise:

- Nora first appears in Batman: Arkham City, in which Professor Hugo Strange has her cryo-chamber brought to the eponymous mega-prison. The Joker initially has his men hold Nora hostage to coerce Mr. Freeze into creating a cure for the Titan formula that is slowly killing him, until Batman secures Nora's chamber for Victor.
- A young Nora appears in the Batman: Arkham Origins DLC "Cold, Cold Heart", in which her disease is stated to be Huntington's disease. Similarly to the Batman: The Animated Series episode "Heart of Ice", Victor used GothCorp's resources in an attempt to save Nora, but GothCorp CEO Ferris Boyle kidnaps her while attacking Victor, inadvertently turning the latter into Mr. Freeze in the process. Freeze goes on a violent quest to rescue Nora from Boyle before Batman eventually subdues Boyle and saves Nora.
- Nora appears in the Batman: Arkham Knight "Season of Infamy" DLC side mission "In From the Cold", voiced by Cissy Jones. After Freeze refuses to aid the Arkham Knight and Scarecrow in their campaign against Batman, the Arkham Knight's militia kidnap Nora in retaliation. Batman rescues Nora, but is forced to awaken her due to her cryo-chamber being damaged. To his and Freeze's surprise, Nora refuses to return to cryostasis, revealing she was aware of her husband's actions while she was frozen and urging him to stop dedicating all of his time and resources to her. Upon reuniting with Nora, Freeze removes his helmet and joins her in leaving Gotham to spend their final days in peace.
- An alternate universe version of Nora named Nora Frias makes a minor non-speaking appearance in Suicide Squad: Kill the Justice League as the cryogenically frozen wife of Victoria Frias / Mrs. Freeze.

=== Miscellaneous ===
- Nora Fries' younger sister Dora Smithy appears in Gotham Girls. She seeks revenge on Nora's husband, Victor Fries, for keeping her sister in a coma, only to end up like Victor by the series finale.
- Nora Fries appears in Smallville Season 11.
