= Heart of Steel (Batman: The Animated Series) =

- Batman: The Animated Series episodes
- The title card from the episode
- Episode nos.: Season 1 Episodes 39 and 40
- Directed by: Kevin Altieri
- Written by: Brynne Stephens
- Based on: Batman by Bob Kane (credited) and Bill Finger (uncredited)
- Original air dates: November 16, 1992; November 17, 1992

Guest appearances
- Jeff Bennett as HARDAC; Leslie Easterbrook as Randa Duane; William Sanderson as Karl Rossum

Episode chronology
← Previous "The Strange Secret of Bruce Wayne"	Next → "If You're So Smart, Why Aren't You Rich?"

"Heart of Steel" is a two-part episode of Batman: The Animated Series, the thirty-eighth and thirty-ninth produced, dealing with a supercomputer named H.A.R.D.A.C. (Holographic Analytical Reciprocating DigitAl Computer) and its attempts to replace Gotham citizens with robotic duplicates before initiating an AI takeover. These were the first Batman scripts to be written by Brynne Stephens, who wrote a total of 7 episodes. The episodes were directed by series regular Kevin Altieri, and originally aired on November 16 and 17, 1992.

== Plot ==
=== Part 1 ===
A woman leaves a briefcase behind at Wayne Enterprises, seemingly deliberately. That night, it grows mechanical limbs and steals microchips from a safe in the research and development department. An alarm goes off, alerting Bruce, who changes into his Batman costume and investigates. He struggles with the robot, eventually chasing it to the roof, where it fires a rocket with the microchips into the sky. Batman takes a hang glider from a rooftop storage unit and pursues it until it is recovered by the woman from the beginning of the episode, who shoots down the glider and escapes.

The next day, Bruce begins to investigate the stolen microchips. He tells Alfred these microchips are a technology called 'wetware', the first stage in the development of self-aware computers. Lucius Fox tells him that the only other company who could compete with Wayne Enterprises in that field is Cybertron Industries, run by the reclusive Karl Rossum. Bruce goes out to Cybertron to meet Rossum, who shows him a giant prototype supercomputer called H.A.R.D.A.C., as well as introducing him to his assistant, Randa Duane. Unable to find out more, Bruce makes a date with Randa and leaves. Once he is gone Duane speaks to H.A.R.D.A.C., who scolds her for not getting design specifications that it needed. H.A.R.D.A.C. is then shown building a humanlike robot with a male form, whose face is not revealed. While Randa is removing her workwear, H.A.R.D.A.C. states that people are beginning to become suspicious and that it must accelerate its activities. The computer tells Randa that the next duplicant is ready and the unknown male-formed robot emerges from a hatch on H.A.R.D.A.C.'s side, its identity hidden in shadow.

At the Gordon residence, Barbara Gordon is doing homework while Commissioner Gordon reads the newspaper. The doorbell rings and a robot version of Gordon appears, tasering him unconscious and attempting to replace him, though Barbara is immediately suspicious. In the meantime, Randa picks Bruce up from Wayne Enterprises and they go to Wayne Manor, though she manages to leave her makeup compact behind. Like the briefcase before it, the compact grows legs and begins stealing files from a computer. When Bruce is alerted to the theft, he abruptly leaves his date with Randa, whom H.A.R.D.A.C. tells that the theft has been unsuccessful, and that the files that it wants are at Wayne Manor. She knocks Alfred unconscious and, using specialized goggles, locates the Batcave and informs H.A.R.D.A.C. of Batman's secret identity.

Bruce returns home, discovers the unconscious Alfred, and immediately dons his Batman costume and proceeds to the Batcave. When he attempts to use the Batcomputer it goes haywire, and suddenly the mechanical arms which previously supported his hang glider descend upon him, dragging him up into the darkness.

=== Part 2 ===
Barbara soon discovers something's wrong with her father. She turns to Batman, who broke free from the mechanical arms. Bullock appears and fights with the Dark Knight. Batman fights back and pushes him against the bat signal. It is revealed that Bullock is an android and that the real Bullock has been kidnapped. Batman leaves to find Gordon and Bullock at Cybertron Industries. Barbara decides to go to Cybertron Industries to find and save her father on her own. Meanwhile, Batman frees Bullock and Gordon but is intervened by a robot run by H.A.R.D.A.C. Barbara arrives at Cybertron Industries, but a robot captures her and takes her to the supercomputer. Batman manages to free himself and fights the robots, causing destruction through the facility. H.A.R.D.A.C. states that many of its core systems have been damaged and that its plan had failed, just before it explodes, either through the damage it had taken or by activating a self-destruct sequence. Batman and the others manage to get out just in time before the whole place is blown up.

== Voice cast ==
- Kevin Conroy as Bruce Wayne / Batman and Batman Duplicant
- Efrem Zimbalist Jr. as Alfred Pennyworth
- Bob Hastings as Commissioner Gordon
- Robert Costanzo as Harvey Bullock
- Lloyd Bochner as Hamilton Hill
- Brock Peters as Lucius Fox
- Melissa Gilbert as Barbara Gordon
- Jeff Bennett as HARDAC
- Leslie Easterbrook as Randa Duane
- William Sanderson as Karl Rossum

== Trivia ==
The name 'Rossum' refers to R.U.R. (Rossum's Universal Robots), a Czech play by Karel Čapek, where the term 'robot' was first coined. Randa is seen driving a car early in the first episode with the license number 'RUR'.

Karl Rossum is modeled on the Blade Runner character J.F. Sebastian, who is also a roboticist portrayed by William Sanderson. In this storyline, the fake humans are called "duplicants;" while in Blade Runner, they were called "replicants."

"Cybertron" may be a reference to the home planet of the primary characters of the Transformers franchise.

== Reception ==
The A.V. Club gave the episode an A−, singling out the depiction of Barbara Gordon as being particularly strong.
