= The Cat and the Claw =

- Batman: The Animated Series episodes
- Title card for Part 1
- Episode nos.: Season 1 Episodes 15 and 16
- Directed by: Kevin Altieri (Part 1) and Dick Sebast (Part 2)
- Story by: Sean Catherine Derek and Laren Bright
- Teleplay by: Jules Dennis and Richard Mueller
- Based on: Batman by Bob Kane (credited) and Bill Finger (uncredited)
- Editing by: Joe Gall
- Original air dates: September 5, 1992 (Part 1); September 12, 1992 (Part 2)
- Running time: 22 minutes

Guest appearances
- Adrienne Barbeau as Selina Kyle / Catwoman; Kate Mulgrew as Red Claw

Episode chronology
← Previous "Heart of Ice"	Next → "See No Evil"

"The Cat and the Claw" is a two-part episode of Batman: The Animated Series, directed by Kevin Altieri and Dick Sebast, which aired on September 5 and September 12, 1992, respectively. Although the episodes were produced consecutively as the 15th and 16th episodes of the first season, the first part aired as the series premiere and was separated from the second part, which was the eighth episode aired.

The plot introduces Catwoman, who tries to purchase land for a mountain lion reserve but a group of terrorists led by Red Claw thwart her, so she and Batman have to put aside their differences in order to stop Red Claw.

== Plot ==
=== Part 1 ===
Catwoman admires her prize

During the night, Catwoman steals a diamond necklace but Batman spots her. She escapes, but her cat, Isis, is nearly run over by a truck, only being saved by Batman's timely intervention. Catwoman calls Isis to her using a whistle, hugs her and blows a kiss to Batman who in turn, whistles softly.

Later, at an animal rights celebrity auction, Catwoman's alter ego, Selina Kyle, outbids other women for a date with Bruce Wayne, Batman's alter ego. Suddenly, gunfire is heard and Bruce goes away to become Batman. He stops the terrorists who are attacking the police. Commissioner Gordon tells Batman that Red Claw, the most ruthless terrorist leader in the world is in Gotham City.

The next day, Bruce meets Selina at her apartment. Suddenly, Selina's lawyer, Martin, calls to inform her that Multigon International, an international company, has taken the land which she purchased for a mountain lion reserve. Bruce arranges a meeting with Multigon's chairman, Stern. Stern tells them that Multigon is planning to build a major resort and there is nothing he can do about it. When Bruce and Selina leave, Red Claw appears, telling Stern to have someone keep an eye on Selina.

The same night, Batman grills a mob boss for information on Red Claw while Catwoman breaks into Multigon. She takes pictures of their real plans for the major resort but a security camera gives away her presence to Red Claw. The terrorists break the door down but Catwoman escapes into the ventilation system. A terrorist corners her but she escapes into another airway. He follows her but her caltrops prick his limbs. The rest of the terrorists catch up to her but she climbs up a rope to the rooftop. She blocks the door using a wooden plank but the terrorists shoot it down. Catwoman makes a daring dash past Red Claw, flips over and leaps towards the next rooftop. Her hands grasp the ledge and Isis jumps over to safety. Red Claw fires a missile at Catwoman, the force of the blast knocks her over.

Batman swings by and saves her. Catwoman kisses him to show her gratitude. When they land on another rooftop, Batman tries to unmask her but she tells him to "keep the mystery". He replies that either he unmasks her or the police to which she tells him not to deny their connection. Batman tells her the law separates them, hurting her feelings. He tries to comfort her but she throws him over, though he grabs a protruding ledge in time. She tells him never to trifle with a woman's affections until next time and he replies that there will be a next time.

Catwoman returns home, unmasks herself and tells Maven, her secretary, that she might save the mountain lions yet. They are unaware that one of Red Claw's terrorists is watching and listening to them. He says, "But who is going to save you?"

=== Part 2 ===
The mob boss tells Batman there is a train heist that night, but none of Gotham's criminals are initiating it. Batman asks Gordon, who deduces it might be a government train. Batman finds the train but Red Claw and her terrorists are already there. Red Claw steals a can of viral plague, threatening to release it knowing Batman won't allow it, allowing Red Claw to escape.

The next day, Bruce drives Selina to lunch when two of Red Claw's terrorists repeatedly bump into Bruce's car. Bruce turns around, driving towards them. The terrorists swerve away, driving off the bridge. Bruce and Selina return home and change into Batman and Catwoman, respectively. Bruce finds Isis's body hair on his jacket, deducing Catwoman's identity. Catwoman goes to the resort, taking pictures of the terrorists when two of them find her. Batman knocks them out, takes Catwoman with him and run away. However, Red Claw captures them, ties them in a shelter, releasing the plague on them. They break free and Batman pours petrol all over before throwing a grenade on it. The heat from the flames destroy the plague while the flames burn the resort. Commissioner Gordon and his policemen arrest the terrorists while Red Claw attacks Catwoman from behind until a mountain lion pounces on her and hits her off the cliff, injuring her.

Catwoman returns home and finds Maven gone. Batman emerges from the shadows, telling her Maven left because the terrorists were after both of them. Catwoman asks him why he didn't tell the police that he found her. He says that he didn't want her to be arrested like a common criminal. She asks him whether he cares or not, leaning forward to kiss him but he handcuffs her saying, "More than you'll ever know."

== Voice cast ==
- Kevin Conroy as Bruce Wayne / Batman
- Bob Hastings as Commissioner Gordon
- Adrienne Barbeau as Selina Kyle / Catwoman
- Herb Edelman as Mr. Stern
- Kate Mulgrew as Red Claw
- Mary McDonald Lewis as Maven
- Frank Welker as Isis
- Neil Ross as Dealer

=== Additional voice ===
- Steve McGowan

== Reception ==
The episodes have been called "a great start to the series" with people praising the Catwoman and Batman/Selina Kyle and Bruce Wayne dynamic, however, the animal reserve/terrorist aspect of the episodes were not well-liked, with IGN thinking it "played heavily on the environmental card". Bruce Timm himself claimed that he was "never crazy" about the series' depiction of Catwoman, singling out the environmentalist/animal rights activist aspect of the character.
