= On Leather Wings =

- Batman: The Animated Series episode
- The title card from the episode
- Episode no.: Season 1 Episode 1
- Directed by: Kevin Altieri
- Written by: Mitch Brian
- Based on: Batman by Bob Kane (credited) and Bill Finger (uncredited)
- Original air date: September 6, 1992

Guest appearances
- Marc Singer and Frank Welker as Kirk Langstrom / Man-Bat; René Auberjonois as Dr. Robert March; Pat Musick as Female Lab Technician; Meredith MacRae as Francine Langstrom

Episode chronology
← Previous —	Next → "Christmas with the Joker"

"On Leather Wings" is the first episode of Batman: The Animated Series. It originally aired on the Fox network in the United States on September 6, 1992. It was written by Mitch Brian and directed by Kevin Altieri. This was the first episode of the series to feature the villain Man-Bat, and was also Man-Bat's first screen appearance. In comics, Man-Bat first appeared in 1970. Although "On Leather Wings" was the first episode of the series to be produced, it was the second to be broadcast, following "The Cat and the Claw, Part 1", which premiered just the day before.

== Plot ==
When something resembling a giant bat is seen in the skies over Gotham City and later attacks a guard at Phoenix Pharmaceuticals, Batman is considered the culprit. Detective Harvey Bullock asks Mayor Hamilton Hill for permission to form a tactical squad to capture Batman, which was denied by Commissioner Gordon, who does not believe Batman is responsible. Hill authorizes the strike force, with District Attorney Harvey Dent promising to put Batman in jail if Bullock catches him.

Believing he was set up, Batman investigates and finds out there were two similar robberies at other pharmaceutical companies. Batman infiltrates Phoenix Pharmaceuticals, unknowingly alerting the security guards, who call the police. As he investigates, Bullock's strike force arrives at the scene, just as Gordon tells him another pharmaceutical company was just robbed across town, proving Batman's innocence. Batman escapes the squad with the only recovered clues: a recording of the guard's attack and a fur sample.

The next day, Bruce Wayne visits the Gotham Zoo to ask bat expert Dr. Robert March about the mysterious fur and recording, but he is reluctant to help. March's daughter and assistant, Francine, and her husband, Dr. Kirk Langstrom, promise Bruce to analyze them both for him. Later March calls to give results of the analysis: the sound is a combination of starlings and brown bats, where the fur sample is also from. When the Batcomputer rules both creatures out, Batman heads to the zoo to further investigate March, where he finds Kirk Langstrom working late; Kirk explains that after they discovered a formula that could create a new species, something neither man nor bat, he had tested it by taking it himself, and quickly became so addicted to it that he lost control and was pushed by the new “creature inside him” to steal the chemicals needed to complete the formula.

Soon after he finishes his explanation, Kirk transforms into a giant bat-like creature, known as the Man-Bat, horrifying both Batman and Francine. Man-Bat escapes the zoo, but Batman grapples with him, and the two engage in a fierce struggle over Gotham. Batman eventually overpowers Man-Bat and takes him back to the Batcave, where he creates a chemical to reverse the effects of Kirk's serum. Batman returns the restored Kirk to Francine at the zoo, who is told by Batman that the chemical is out of his system; however, the Man-Bat may not truly be gone.

== Voice cast ==
- Kevin Conroy as Bruce Wayne / Batman and Police Blimp Pilot
- Bob Hastings as Commissioner Gordon
- Richard Moll as Harvey Dent, Security Guard and Batcomputer
- Lloyd Bochner as Hamilton Hill
- Robert Costanzo as Detective Bullock
- Clive Revill as Alfred Pennyworth and Police Blimp Radioman
- Marc Singer and Frank Welker as Dr. Kirk Langstorm / Man-Bat
- René Auberjonois as Dr. Robert March
- Pat Musick as Female Lab Technician
- Meredith MacRae as Dr. Francine Langstrom

== Production ==
Bruce Timm states that he wanted Batman: The Animated Series to focus on "mystery, mood, drama as well as superhero action sequences" and that Man-Bat fit into those categories perfectly. In an interview, he says, "Man-Bat was chosen specifically [for the first episode] because he wasn't familiar to very many people outside of comic book fans. Nobody had any preconceived notions about him. It wasn't like the Joker, where you had to deal with people expecting him to be Jack Nicholson or Cesar Romero".

== Reception ==
Lon Grahnke of the Chicago Sun-Times gave the episode two stars, but added that his six-year-old son thought the premiere was "awesome". Jim Bullard of the St. Petersburg Times wrote: "The episode is extremely well-written and drawn — an unusual combination in cartoons. The result is a unique, memorable style".
