= Christmas with the Joker =

- Batman: The Animated Series episode
- Episode no.: Season 1 Episode 2
- Directed by: Kent Butterworth
- Written by: Eddie Gorodetsky
- Based on: Batman by Bob Kane (credited) and Bill Finger (uncredited)
- Original air date: November 13, 1992

Guest appearance
- Mark Hamill as The Joker

Episode chronology
← Previous "On Leather Wings"	Next → "Nothing to Fear"

"Christmas with the Joker" is the second episode of Batman: The Animated Series. It originally aired on the Fox network in the United States on November 13, 1992. It was written by Eddie Gorodetsky and directed by Kent Butterworth.

The episode marks the series' first appearance of The Joker, as well as the first time the character would be voiced by Mark Hamill; he would go on to voice the character for many years in various animation works and video games. It would also mark Dick Grayson/Robin's first appearance in the series as well.

== Plot ==
On Christmas Eve, The Joker escapes from Arkham Asylum using a rocket hidden inside a Christmas tree. Batman and Robin begin patrolling Gotham City to search for him, with Robin being skeptical of this particular patrol being worthwhile, opting to relax and get into the holiday spirit at Wayne Manor. After finding Gotham to be uncharacteristically peaceful, the Dynamic Duo return to Wayne Manor to watch It's a Wonderful Life when they discover that Joker has hijacked Gotham's television signals. He announces that he is going to broadcast his assault on Gotham as a Christmas special. Joker is speaking to a "live" studio audience consisting of cardboard cutouts of Gotham's various public servants, including Batman and Robin. Joker tells the camera that because he does not have a family to spend the holidays with, he has kidnapped Commissioner Gordon, Summer Gleeson, and Harvey Bullock to serve as one. Joker tells the camera that if Batman cannot track him down by midnight, he will kill the three hostages.

Using the Batcomputer, Batman accesses Gotham's electrical mainframe and pinpoints the location of Joker's signal by tracking power surges. Joker's hired thugs, Donner and Blitzen, blow up one of Gotham's bridges, just as the 11:30 train is about to cross. Gleeson reveals that her mother is on the train, prompting a taunt from Joker. Batman and Robin hurry to intercept the train. Robin uncouples the passenger cars, while Batman rescues the engineer just in time for the train to careen off the blown-up tracks and into the valley below. Batman determines that Joker's signal is coming from the observatory at the top of Mt. Gotham. The Caped Crusaders head to the top of the mountain, and discover a radio transmitter left by the Joker. Joker reveals that he has replaced the observatory's telescope with a cannon, which he fires upon Batman and Robin.

As Batman draws the cannon's fire, which starts to shoot randomly at the city, Robin breaks into the observatory to disable the cannon. Upon entering, Robin discovers a number of Joker robots with gun fingers, who start firing upon him. Robin is quickly able to destroy the robots, allowing him to neutralize the cannon with a detonator.

Joker then gives the Dynamic Duo a clue to his hideout by broadcasting footage of Summer Gleeson opening a "Betty Blooper" doll. Batman recalls that these dolls are no longer sold, as Laffco, the toy company that produced them, has been out of business for the last fourteen years, and deduces that the Laffco factory must be the Joker's hideout. Once they enter the factory, Joker, who has anticipated their arrival, sends out several giant robot nutcracker soldiers, which they dispose of rather easily. Suddenly, a number of toy planes fly towards them. Batman smashes most of the planes with a baseball bat, and Robin manages to catch the remaining planes in an oil barrel. Donner and Blitzen suddenly appear with machine guns and begin firing upon the duo. Using his grappling hook, Batman ascends to a higher level and hides behind a pile of gigantic teddy bears. At first, Donner and Blitzen are unsure of where the Dark Knight went, but they resume firing once they see his cape move across the bear pile. But the cape is actually concealing one of the teddy bears, which falls over the railing and lands on the two thugs, pinning them to the ground.

Batman leaps back down to the ground, telling Robin to keep an eye out for the Joker. Suddenly, a large pair of curtains are drawn back, revealing Joker, who has Gordon, Gleeson, and Bullock dangling over a vat of hot molten plastic. Joker threatens to cut the rope hoisting the hostages unless Batman opens his "present", a package wrapped in Batman-symbol wrapping paper. Batman opens the package to discover a spring-loaded pie, which splatters all over his face, to the Joker's hysterics. After wiping the pie off, Batman advances on his nemesis, leading Joker to cut the rope. Batman makes a tremendous leap, catching the bundled hostages and pushing them out of the way of the vat. Batman grabs the Joker, but fails to hold him as he was apparently wearing two sweaters, and simply wriggles out of one of them. Batman chases a howling Joker up a catwalk. Just as Joker is making his escape, he slips on a loose roller skate and topples over the catwalk railing. Batman grabs him by the leg, narrowly saving him from plunging into the vat. Batman sneers, "Merry Christmas, Joker", to which Joker angrily retorts, "Bah Humbug".

Bruce Wayne and Dick Grayson retire to Wayne Manor to watch a taped copy of It's A Wonderful Life, given to them by Commissioner Gordon. Meanwhile, Joker spends Christmas in a straitjacket, alone in his cell. However, being the Joker, he remains upbeat, singing "Deck the Halls", laughs hysterically, and ends the episode by saying, "Merry Christmas".

== Voice cast ==
- Kevin Conroy as Bruce Wayne / Batman (credited), Donner (uncredited)
- Robert Costanzo as Detective Harvey Bullock (credited), Blitzen (uncredited)
- Bob Hastings as Commissioner Jim Gordon
- Clive Revill as Alfred Pennyworth
- Mark Hamill as The Joker
- Mari Devon as Summer Gleeson (credited), Woman (uncredited)
- Loren Lester as Dick Grayson / Robin

== Production ==
This is the only episode written by Eddie Gorodetsky, as well as the only one directed by Kent Butterworth.

Tim Curry was originally intended to voice the Joker, but his performance was seen as "too scary" by the Batman: The Animated Series producers and he was replaced after recording three episodes. At the 2017 Fan Expo Canada, Curry claimed he developed bronchitis during the initial recording sessions, which contributed to him being replaced. John Glover, who later voiced the Riddler, also auditioned for the Joker role. Ultimately, the role was given to Mark Hamill, who worked to craft a multifaceted laugh for the Joker that could change to reflect the Joker's current mood, likening it to a musical instrument. Hamill, who found himself to be the biggest fan of the Batman comics among the cast, credited the laughs he had honed on stage in Amadeus with landing him the role. Hamill's take on the Joker is considered to be groundbreaking for the voice-acting industry and led to Hamill having an enormously successful voice-acting career.

== Reception ==
Leonard Pierce of The A.V. Club gave the episode a B rating, writing, "I can't rate this episode too highly, since it's pretty inconsequential and technically not very well-executed, especially compared to what came before it. It's also got a lot of padding. It could easily be 15 minutes and far tighter...But it's a funny, charming piece of work, by no means a failure, and it provides some memorable lines and the beginning of two relationships—Batman and the Joker and Batman and Robin—that are essential to the show's development. It does what it needs to do quite well, and for that reason, I can't rate it too poorly, either."
