= Batman & Mr. Freeze: SubZero =

1998 direct-to-video animated superhero film directed by Boyd Kirkland

- Home video release poster
- Directed by: Boyd Kirkland
- Written by: Boyd Kirkland; Randy Rogel
- Based on: Batman by Bill Finger and Bob Kane
- Produced by: Boyd Kirkland; Randy Rogel
- Starring: Kevin Conroy; Michael Ansara; Loren Lester; Efrem Zimbalist Jr.; Mary Kay Bergman
- Edited by: Al Breitenbach
- Music by: Michael McCuistion
- Production company: Warner Bros. Animation
- Distributed by: Warner Home Video
- Release date: March 17, 1998
- Running time: 66 minutes
- Country: United States
- Language: English

Batman & Mr. Freeze: SubZero is a 1998 American animated superhero film, the second film based on Batman: The Animated Series, taking place between the end of the show and the start of The New Batman Adventures. Kevin Conroy and Michael Ansara reprise their respective roles from the series as the two title characters while Mary Kay Bergman replaces Melissa Gilbert as the voice of Batgirl. It was produced by Warner Bros. Animation as a marketing tie-in with Batman & Robin and was animated overseas by Koko Enterprises and Dong Yang Animation in South Korea. The film received positive reviews from critics and won the Annie Award for Best Home Video Animation.

== Plot ==
Since his last encounter against Batman, (Note: Depicted in the episode Deep Freeze.) Victor Fries has made a home for himself in an Arctic cave with a newly adopted Inuit son, Koonak, and polar bears Notchka and Shaka. His wife, Nora, remains in her cryogenic chamber while he seeks a cure for her illness. A research submarine surfaces through the frozen floor of the cave, shattering Nora's containment vessel and causing her to rapidly deteriorate. Fries freezes the submarine crew and returns to Gotham City, enlisting his old colleague Dr. Gregory Belson to help find a cure.

Belson determines that Nora's only chance at survival is an organ transplant, but due to her rare blood type there are no suitable donors. Fries declares they will use a live donor, even if it means killing an innocent person, and bribes a reluctant Belson into compliance with a promise of gold that will end his current financial problems. After learning that Barbara Gordon (Batgirl) is a perfect match, Fries kidnaps her while she is on a date with Dick Grayson (Robin). Barbara is taken to an abandoned oil platform, where Fries and Belson falsely tell her they need her for a blood transfusion to save Nora.

Back in Gotham, Bruce Wayne (Batman) and Dick investigate Barbara's kidnapping, which leads them on the trail of Belson, whose wrecked car Bruce had discovered earlier in a deep puddle on the night of his disappearance despite no rain. They investigate Belson's home and track Belson's broker, Dean Arbagast, who explains Belson's debts to them. In the process, Belson calls Arbagast from the oil platform, allowing them to learn where Fries has taken Belson and Barbara. They also deduce Fries's plan from a list of supplies used for an organ transplant that Belson left behind. As they head for the oil rig in the Batwing, Barbara realizes Fries and Belson have been lying to her and escapes with the help of Koonak, who Fries had falsely promised that Barbara would not be harmed. Batman and Robin arrive and confront Fries and Belson, who accidentally starts a fire by shooting at the fuel tanks. Fries traps Batman and Robin and orders Belson to perform the operation despite the fire spreading rapidly across the rig, but Belson pushes Fries under some falling debris and attempts to escape, only to end up crushed and killed by the falling helipad while driving a speedboat.

Batman and Robin escape and free Fries with Barbara's help and he in turn, despite his leg having been broken, helps them with saving Nora and Koonak, but while everyone else is put onto the Batwing, Batman is unable to save Fries, who plummets to his apparent death. Batman makes it back to the Batwing and they fly away just as the rig finally explodes. Fries, however, is revealed to have survived, and swims to safety with the bears.

Sometime later, Fries has returned to the Arctic, and sees on a television in a research station that while the world believes him dead, Nora has been revived after an organ transplant funded by Wayne Enterprises, moving him to tears of joy as he walks away with his polar bears.

== Voice cast ==
- Michael Ansara as Dr. Victor Fries / Mr. Freeze
- Kevin Conroy as Bruce Wayne / Batman
- Loren Lester as Dick Grayson / Robin
- Mary Kay Bergman as Barbara Gordon / Batgirl
- Efrem Zimbalist Jr. as Alfred Pennyworth
- Bob Hastings as Commissioner James Gordon
- George Dzundza as Dr. Gregory Belson
- Marilu Henner as Veronica Vreeland
- Dean Jones as Dean Arbagast
- Mari Devon as Summer Gleeson
- Liane Schirmer as Lieutenant Renee Montoya
- Robert Costanzo as Detective Harvey Bullock
- James Smith as Detective Galpern
- Lauren Tom as Mariko
- Rahi Azizi as Koonak
- Townsend Coleman, Brian George, Ed Gilbert, Carl Lumbly, Tress MacNeille, Neil Ross, Randy Thompson as Additional Voices

== Production ==
The film was completed in 1997 as a tie-in to Joel Schumacher's Batman & Robin (which also featured Mr. Freeze as the main villain and Batgirl as one of the protagonists). Its release date, however, was pushed back to 1998 after the poor reception of Schumacher's film. Boyd Kirkland and Randy Rogel produced and wrote the film, both of whom had previously worked on numerous episodes of Batman: The Animated Series. According to series developer Bruce Timm, who was not involved with the film, he stated he would not have brought Nora back to life, considering her dead since going under cryonic stasis. When he discovered that Nora Fries was to be brought to life in the film, he was forced to drop the idea of adapting Glen Murakami's story "White Christmas" in The New Batman Adventures episode "Holiday Knights", as it would have been required to have Nora dead, as in the original issue written by Murakami. The New Batman Adventures episode "Cold Comfort" would address the events of the film.

It was the final Batman direct-to-video film to use cel animation.

== Reception ==
=== Critical response ===
Based on 12 reviews collected on Rotten Tomatoes, 92% of critics have given the film a positive review, with an average rating of 6.6/10.

TV Guide praised the film for being "more enjoyable — and far less campy — than Joel Schumacher's first two live-action Batman movies." In addition, the magazine stated that "Though clearly aimed at kids, there's also plenty to keep adult viewers entertained, not the least of which are the amusingly curvaceous drawings of several dishy dames and the exaggerated muscularity of Batman & Robin."

DVD Talk noted that the film was a solid adventure that played out like an extended Batman: The Animated Series episode, praising the character of Mr. Freeze but criticizing the simplistic plotting and scripting.

== Release ==
SubZero was originally slated for a release on July 15, 1997, and to be cross-promoted with Planet Hollywood and Six Flags Theme Parks, but due to the poor reception of Batman & Robin it was delayed and did not see release until March 17, 1998. Trailers for the film, narrated by the late Tony Jay, were featured on Warner Home Video's VHS releases in 1997 and 1998, including Eraser (1996), Batman & Robin, Selena (1997), and Warner Bros. Family Entertainment titles such as Space Jam, Free Willy 3: The Rescue, Wild America (1997), The Bugs Bunny/Road Runner Movie, and A Rat's Tale (1997). The film made its television premiere on January 15, 1999 on Cartoon Network's Toonami block.

The film was included in the 2018 Blu-ray release of Batman The Complete Animated Series box set.

== Sequel ==
After the success of this film, Warner Bros. greenlit the production of another film, entitled Batman: Arkham. Boyd Kirkland was attached to write and direct. The film would have Batman and Robin facing off against a collection of Arkham Asylum escapees, in addition to Batman finding himself falling in love with a new character, planned to be voiced by Angie Harmon. The main cast of Batman: The Animated Series was attached to reprise their roles. Steven E. Gordon also drew some art concept for the film. However, the film was eventually canceled in favor of Batman Beyond: Return of the Joker (which also featured Harmon as a much older Barbara Gordon, with Tara Strong voicing young Barbara in the flashback sequence), while Batman: Arkham eventually became the name of a successful video game series by Rocksteady Studios and featured Conroy as the voice of Batman.

The fourth and final film of the original run of the DCAU, Batman: Mystery of the Batwoman, based on The New Batman Adventures, was released in 2003.
