= Perchance to Dream (Batman: The Animated Series) =

- Batman: The Animated Series episode
- Title card from "Perchance to Dream"
- Episode no.: Season 1 Episode 30
- Directed by: Boyd Kirkland
- Written by: Laren Bright and Michael Reaves (story); Joe R. Lansdale (teleplay)
- Based on: Batman by Bob Kane (credited) and Bill Finger (uncredited)
- Original air date: October 19, 1992

Guest appearances
- Adrienne Barbeau as Selina Kyle / Catwoman and Martha Wayne; Roddy McDowall as Jervis Tetch / The Mad Hatter; Diana Muldaur as Dr. Leslie Thompkins

Episode chronology
← Previous "Eternal Youth"	Next → "The Cape and Cowl Conspiracy"

"Perchance to Dream" is the 30th episode of Batman: The Animated Series. It was written by noted horror author Joe R. Lansdale and originally aired on October 19, 1992. In this episode, Bruce Wayne awakes in a seemingly idyllic dream world where his parents are still alive and someone else is Batman. The title is taken from the famous soliloquy from Shakespeare's Hamlet. The episode received acclaim from both fans and critics, and is often regarded as one of the best episodes of the series.

== Plot ==
Batman pursues a group of criminals into a warehouse where he is blinded by a flash of light and knocked unconscious. He awakens in bed as Bruce Wayne, with no memory of how he came to be there.

It becomes clear that something is wrong: there is no Batcave beneath Wayne Manor, and Alfred knows nothing of Bruce's alter ego or Robin. Furthermore, Bruce's parents are still alive, and he is engaged to Selina Kyle, who has no knowledge of her own double life as Catwoman. He can find no evidence of his adventures as Batman and begins doubting his sanity – especially when he sees another "Batman" in action while on an outing with Selina.

Bruce meets with long-time confidante Leslie Thompkins, who tells him that his thoughts of being Batman are merely delusions arising from his guilt and feelings of unworthiness at having such an easy life. He starts to settle into his new reality, which appears to embody everything he has ever wanted, until he discovers that the words in both a newspaper and books from his library are garbled and illegible.

Bruce heads to Gotham Cemetery, evading policemen who are attempting to take him into custody. A storm rises as he climbs a bell tower and finds himself face-to-face with Batman. Bruce demands answers, saying he knows he is in a dream world, as reading is a function of the left side of the brain, while dreams are a function of the right, making it impossible to read in a dream. The two struggle and Bruce unmasks the imposter as the Mad Hatter who confirms Bruce's assertion. He further explains that Bruce's secret identity has not been compromised as he is only a dream version of the villain and the real one cannot see into the dream world which Bruce cannot escape from, but Bruce suspects there is a way through which he can, suddenly leaping from the belfry to his apparent death.

Bruce awakens back in the warehouse as Batman with the Mad Hatter’s dream machine attached to his head. He escapes and overpowers the villain, demanding an explanation. The Mad Hatter tells him that he was merely trying to give Batman a perfect life so he would stay out of his. Batman turns him over to the police and leaves, facing reality once more.

== Voice cast ==
- Kevin Conroy as Bruce Wayne / Batman and Thomas Wayne
- Bob Hastings as Commissioner Gordon
- Efrem Zimbalist Jr. as Alfred Pennyworth
- Adrienne Barbeau as Selina Kyle / Catwoman and Martha Wayne
- Brian Cummings as Reporter
- Roddy McDowall as Jervis Tetch / The Mad Hatter
- Diana Muldaur as Dr. Leslie Thompkins

== Reception ==
"Perchance to Dream" is a very highly regarded episode of Batman: The Animated Series. It received a positive review and an "A−" mark from The A.V. Club. The Animated Batman refers to it as "an astonishing tour de force... the best episode of the series", and Retrojunk calls the battle between Bruce Wayne and Batman "one of the saddest and most humanistic conclusions in the history of animated television".

Kevin Conroy, the voice of Batman, considered this his favorite episode of the series. Troy Baker, who voices the character in the Lego and Telltale video games and several animated films, has also claimed this.
