= Dick Sebast =

American film director

- Occupations: Animator; director; television director

Richard Sebast is an American director, story director, animator, and television producer known for working at companies such as Disney, Hanna-Barbera, Warner Bros., Marvel, MGM, and Universal Animation Studios.

== Career ==
Dick Sebast began his career in 1972 at Walt Disney Productions as an animator on Winnie the Pooh and Tigger Too, The Many Adventures of Winnie the Pooh, and as writer/animator on The Rescuers.

He then joined Hanna-Barbera and worked as a story director on Challenge of the Superfriends, The Ri¢hie Ri¢h/Scooby-Doo Show, and The Fonz and the Happy Days Gang.

He then joined Ruby-Spears Productions and did development and story direction on various projects including, Thundarr the Barbarian, The Plastic Man Comedy/Adventure Show, Goldie Gold and Action Jack, Dragon's Lair, Mister T, Chuck Norris: Karate Kommandos, and Sectaurs.

His next project was as a storyboard artist, character designer and sequence director on the feature animated film, Rover Dangerfield. He directed nine episodes of the first season of Batman: The Animated Series for which he won an Emmy as the director of the episode, "Robin's Reckoning, Part 1".

Following this, he produced and directed the first season of Sonic the Hedgehog for DIC Entertainment. He worked as a storyboard artist on the 1994 TV series, Spider-Man, which he followed up as the producer/director of The Incredible Hulk TV series for New World Animation.

He directed The Secret of NIMH 2: Timmy to the Rescue, which was released in 1998.

Later he was a storyboard artist on The Legend of Tarzan series for Walt Disney TV Animation and was a director on the TV series Max Steel for Sony Television (Adelaide Productions) and The Mummy for Universal Cartoon Studio.

From 2004 to 2005, he was a director on the Ultimate Avengers II and Doctor Strange direct-to-video features for Marvel Entertainment/Lionsgate. In 2006, he joined Universal Animation Studios as the director of a number of episodes of The Land Before Time: The Series.
