= Mitch Brian =

American filmmaker and screenwriter

- Born: October 15, 1961 (age 64); Hutchinson, Kansas, U.S.
- Education: California State University, Northridge
- Occupations: Screenwriter, director, professor
- Years active: 1980s–present
- Employer: University of Missouri–Kansas City
- Organization: UMKC
- Notable work: Batman: The Animated Series; Rules of Prey; Seven Days in May (remake)

Mitch Brian (born October 15, 1961) is an American television writer, screenwriter and film director. He has sold, optioned or written on assignment more than 25 scripts to major studios, networks and independent production companies. Having grown up in Hutchinson, Kansas, he attended film school at California State University, Northridge.

== Career ==
In Los Angeles he worked as a story analyst until being hired to write a pair of low-budget films. He later sold the spec script Cold Sweat to Universal/Imagine and then worked as a co-creator on Warner Bros. Animation’s Batman. In addition to co-writing the series bible, he wrote the episodes “On Leather Wings,” “POV” and “Bane.” After writing an episode for CBS’s Viper he adapted John Sanford’s crime-thriller Rules of Prey for Dino De Laurentiis.

Brian teamed up with Kevin Willmott and wrote Shields Green & The Gospel of John Brown, which was sold to Chris Columbus' 1492 Pictures.The two went on to write the Native-American drama Civilized Tribes for 20th Century Fox. They then wrote two screenplays for producer Oliver Stone: Little Brown Brother, about the Philippine–American War, and a biography of Custer based on Michael Blake’s novel Marching to Valhalla. They also wrote two miniseries for NBC, House of Getty and the 70's, which was produced in 2000.

Brian adapted Thomas Hardy’s Far From the Madding Crowd for New Line and producer Geena Davis and then sold the screenplay 21 about World War I fighter ace Frank Luke to 20th Century Fox. He wrote an episode for HBO's unproduced series about Jefferson & Adams called Patriots and adapted Detour: A Hollywood Story for ABC and executive producer James Ellroy about the Lana Turner-Johnny Stompanto scandal. He then adapted Bob King’s fictional military memoir Spooky 8 for FX.

He and Robert Schwentke co-wrote an adaptation of David Morrell’s horror novel The Totem for Mission Entertainment and revised Phoenix’s Last Voyage of the Demeter, about the ill-fated ship that transported Dracula to England in Bram Stoker’s novel. They also worked on Touchstone’s action-thriller Labor Day and adapted Noah Gordon’s novel The Physician.

Most recently, Brian wrote a remake of the political thriller Seven Days in May. As a director, his films include the award winning shorts Hang Ups, James Ellroy’s Stay Clean and Rhubarb Pie.

== Other ventures ==
He is currently a teaching professor at University of Missouri-Kansas City.

His plays “Maul of the Dead” and “Sorority House of the Dead” are published by Dramatic publishing.

His play based on Roger Corman's “A Bucket of Blood” premiered March 21, 2012 at The Living Room. "The Temperamental Artist or A Bucket of Blood" was published by Dramatic Publishing in 2013.

In 2012 his short story “Last Night at the Rialto” was included in the Akashic Books anthology “Kansas City Noir."

His play "Dracula: A Song of Love and Death" had its world premiere in Kansas City on October 12, 2018. It was a co-production by Kansas City Actors Theatre and the UMKC Theatre Department's MFA program.

== Jetpack Pictures ==
In 2013 he formed Jetpack Pictures with Todd Norris to produce commercials, documentaries and music videos. They have produced and directed music videos for Tiny Horse, The Grisly Hand, The Latenight Callers and Katy Guillen and The Girls.

== Screenwriting ==
=== Television ===
- Batman: The Animated Series (1992, 1994)
- Viper (1994)
