= Kevin Altieri =

American television producer

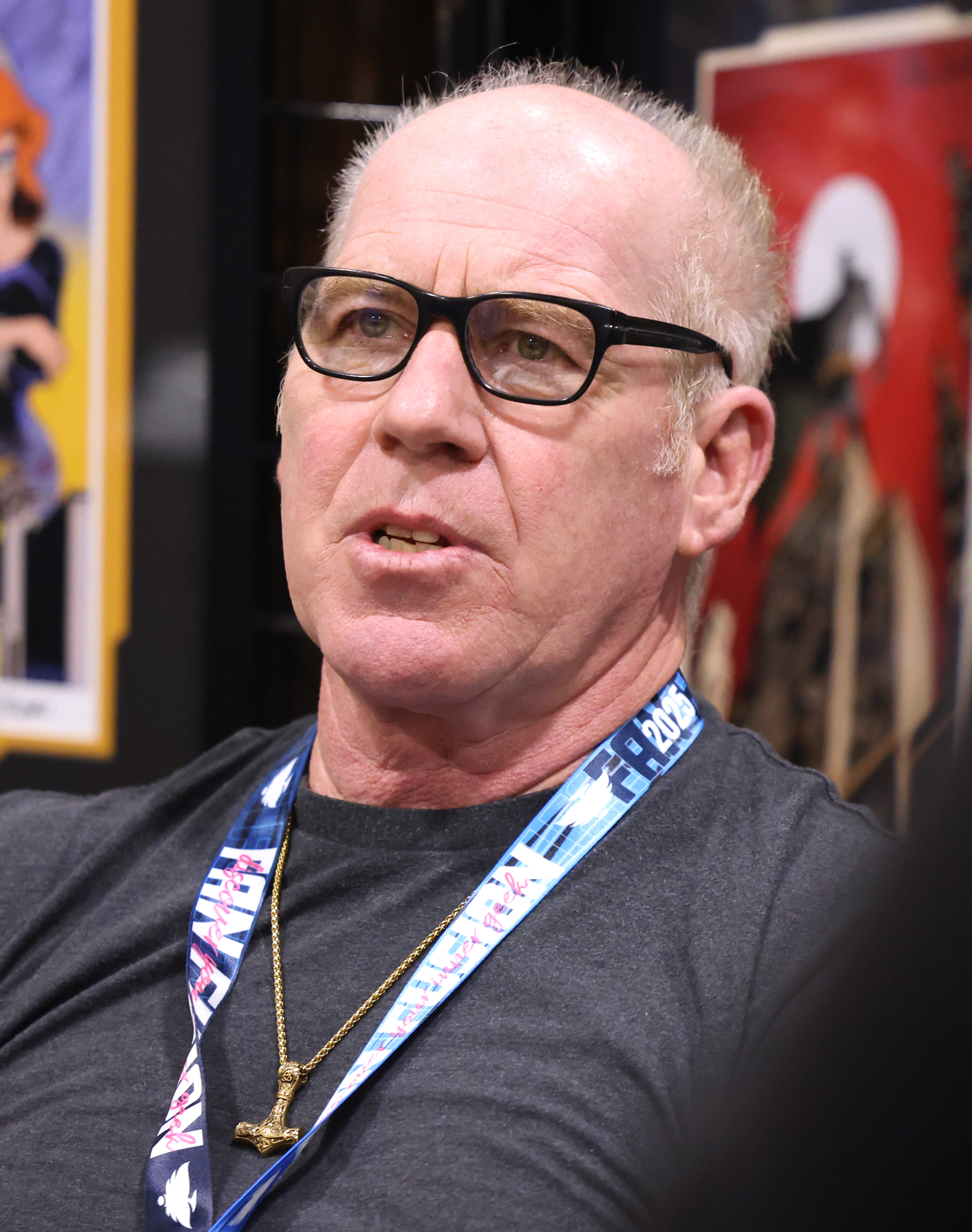
- Altieri in 2025
- Occupation: Television director
- Years active: 1986–present

Kevin Altieri is an American television director of animated cartoons. Altieri's directorial works include episodes of C.O.P.S., Batman: The Animated Series and Stripperella.

Altieri co-directed the music video for Pearl Jam's "Do the Evolution" with Todd McFarlane.

Altieri directed the five-minute pilot for Rat Bastard, a cartoon based on the Crucial Comics series of the same name; the short was produced by Imagine Entertainment and pitched to UPN in 2000.

== Partial filmography ==
=== Television ===
Year	Title	Role
1986	Rambo: The Force of Freedom	Story direction
1988	COPS	Director
1989	ALF Tales	Director
1992	Batman: The Animated Series	Director
2003	Stripperella	Director, producer
2008–2009	The Spectacular Spider-Man	Director
2010–2011	G.I. Joe: Renegades	Director
2014	Transformers: Rescue Bots	Director
2017–2018	Stretch Armstrong and the Flex Fighters	Director

=== Film ===
Year	Title	Role
1984	Exterminator 2	Storyboard artist
1993	Batman: Mask of the Phantasm	Storyboard design, sequence director
2000	Gen^{13}	Director, screenwriter
2002	Treasure Planet	Additional visual development
