= Batman: The Animated Series =

American animated television series

- Also known as: The Adventures of Batman & Robin
- Genre: Superhero; Action; Adventure; Thriller; Mystery; Psychological drama
- Created by: Eric Radomski; Bruce W. Timm
- Based on: Batman by Bob Kane (credited) and Bill Finger (uncredited)
- Developed by: Bruce W. Timm; Paul Dini; Mitch Brian
- Showrunners: Eric Radomski; Bruce W. Timm
- Written by: Sean Catherine Derek (season 1); Martin Pasko (season 1); Paul Dini; Michael Reaves; Randy Rogel; Brynne Stephens
- Directed by: Andrea Romano (voice director)
- Voices of: Kevin Conroy; Clive Revill; Efrem Zimbalist Jr.; Loren Lester; Bob Hastings; Robert Costanzo; Mark Hamill; Arleen Sorkin
- Theme music composer: Danny Elfman; Shirley Walker
- Composers: Shirley Walker; Harvey Cohen; Lolita Ritmanis; Michael McCuistion; Stuart Balcomb; Richard Bronskill; Carl Johnson; Kristopher Carter; Carlos Rodriguez; Wayne Coster
- Country of origin: United States
- Original language: English
- No. of seasons: 2
- No. of episodes: 85 (list of episodes)

Production
- Executive producers: Jean MacCurdy; Tom Ruegger
- Producers: Alan Burnett; Paul Dini; Eric Radomski; Bruce W. Timm
- Running time: 22 minutes
- Production companies: Warner Bros. Animation; Warner Bros. Family Entertainment

Original release
- Network: Fox Kids
- Release: September 5, 1992 – September 15, 1995

Related
- The New Batman Adventures; Batman Beyond; Justice League; Justice League Unlimited; Batman: Caped Crusader

Batman: The Animated Series (often shortened as Batman TAS or BTAS) is an American animated superhero television series based on the DC Comics superhero Batman. Developed by Bruce Timm and Eric Radomski, and produced by Warner Bros. Animation, it originally aired on Fox Kids from September 5, 1992, to September 15, 1995, with a total of 85 episodes. Mid-way through the series' run, it was re-titled The Adventures of Batman & Robin.

Batman: The Animated Series has received widespread acclaim since its release and was hailed as a groundbreaking superhero show, receiving praise for its writing, art design, voice acting, orchestrated soundtrack, and modernization of its title character's source material. Its critical success led to the show winning multiple Daytime Emmy Awards, as well as the Primetime Emmy Award for Outstanding Animated Programming.

After the series ended its original run, a follow-up titled The New Batman Adventures began airing on Kids' WB in 1997 as a continuation of the series, featuring a revamped animation style. Airing for 24 episodes, it has often been included in the same syndicated re-run packages and home media releases as the final season. Batman: The Animated Series also became the first in the continuity of the shared DC Animated Universe, which spawned further animated TV series, feature films, comic books, and video games helmed by much of the same creative talent, including the 1993 theatrical film Batman: Mask of the Phantasm.

== Series overview ==
Season	Episodes	Originally released		
Season	Episodes	First released	Last released	Network
1	65	September 5, 1992	September 17, 1993	Fox Kids
2	20	May 2, 1994	September 15, 1995	Fox Kids

Batman: The Animated Series follows Bruce Wayne and his superhero alter ego Batman as he fights crime in Gotham City while also exploring the lives of city residents impacted by crime and corruption. Although the series centers on Batman's battles with various villains, it delves into their complex backgrounds, revealing the personal struggles and thus making them more "relatable." For instance, a scientist attempts to force someone to love him, while a former star tries to relive her lost fame. While action is a major part of the show, it also addresses themes and social issues such as mental illness, loss, divorce, patent law, insurance fraud, homelessness, class prejudice, age discrimination, typecasting, prison abuse, and animal testing.

The series adapts classic Batman comic book stories into episodes. Notable examples include "The Laughing Fish", which brought Joker's antics from Detective Comics #475-476 to animation as he attempts to copyright Jokerized fish. In "The Cape & Cowl Conspiracy," Batman faced deadly traps inspired by Detective Comics #450. "Moon of the Wolf" sees Batman investigating werewolf attacks based on Batman #255. "The Demon's Quest" introduced Ra's Al Ghul from Batman #232 and #244. "Two-Face" delved into Harvey Dent's backstory, while "A Bullet for Bullock" had detective Harvey Bullock teaming up with Batman to solve a dangerous case.

=== In other media ===
Sixteen minutes of animated segments in the video game The Adventures of Batman & Robin for the Sega CD are sometimes referred to as a "lost episode" of the series. These segments are intended to be interspersed between gameplay elements of an early-1990s video game, so the sound, color and story are not the same quality as the actual television program. Additionally, because Sega did not have to follow the censorship rules of the show, the fights were somewhat more violent than those in the animated series. Many of the show's voice actors reprised their roles for the game, and are thus in the lost episode. Similar cutscenes appear throughout the video games Batman: Vengeance and Batman: Rise of Sin Tzu.

== Production ==
=== Development ===
In 1990, following the success of the Tiny Toons series, Warner Bros. Animation president Jean MacCurdy announced to the animation team that Warner wanted to develop several of its licenses, including Batman. Rumours about Batman related TV series appeared as early as January of 1990.

Following this news, Bruce Timm was tasked with designing Batman, and Eric Radomski was assigned to design the sets. Radomski, who knew Batman primarily from the 1966 series and the 1989 Tim Burton film, was particularly inspired by the latter. At the request of MacCurdy, Timm and Radomski, who had never worked together before, produced a silent short film called The Dark Knight's First Night in about six weeks to pitch the series to Fox. They decided to draw inspiration from the 1940 Superman series and received assistance from the studio Lightbox Animation. Fox greenlit the project before they saw the short, but this led to Timm and Radomski taking charge of the project, despite having no prior experience producing a series. Since the series had no writers at this stage, MacCurdy recruited Alan Burnett, who was considering leaving animation due to his frustration with the restrictions imposed by the Broadcast Standards and Practices department. It was the short film, along with MacCurdy's assertion that the series would feature guns and fighting, that convinced Burnett to participate. At the time, animated series were generally not very diverse, being mainly aimed at children and constrained by numerous restrictions, especially concerning violence. The production had to navigate these censorship guidelines; although weapons could be shown and characters could shoot, the series was not allowed to depict bullet holes or show characters dying, for example.

Unlike most other animated series, the artists, directors, and writers worked closely together to ensure effective communication. Each writer received a "scripture bible" written by Timm, along with writers Paul Dini and Mitch Brian, to outline the overall vision of the series and its characters.

=== Visual style and themes ===
Originally, the series was partly inspired by Tim Burton's blockbuster Batman (1989), which portrayed Batman's universe as darker than in previous adaptations. The series also took influence from Burton's sequel film, Batman Returns (1992). The creators abandoned some of the gothic aspects of the film, instead incorporating more Art Deco elements inspired by 1940s-era New York, coining this unique aesthetic "Dark Deco." Without a precise temporal setting, the city features a blend of 1940s cars, police "blimps," and futuristic helicopters, alongside Batman's advanced vehicles, while television broadcasts are shown in black and white. The backgrounds were drawn on black paper to create darker settings, whereas white paper is typically used. Radomski issued a standing order to the animation department that all backgrounds be painted using light colors on black paper as opposed to the industry standard of dark colors on white paper.

The series employs "vintage" colors, partly inspired by the 1940s Superman cartoons, as well as film noir classics like The Cabinet of Dr. Caligari (1921), Citizen Kane (1941), and Metropolis (1927). Background designer Ted Blackman cited Eyvind Earle and Bruce McCall as influences, particularly for their ability to depict "cartoonish settings." The distinctive visual combination of "noir" imagery and Art Deco design was dubbed "Dark Deco" by the producers.

The show depicts outright physical violence against antagonists, including realistic firearms (though only one character, Commissioner Gordon, was ever depicted as having been shot, in the episode "I Am the Night"). First-time producers Timm and Radomski reportedly encountered resistance from studio executives, but the success of Burton's first film allowed the embryonic series to survive long enough to produce a pilot episode, "On Leather Wings", which, according to Timm, "got a lot of people off our backs".

=== Animation and character design ===
For the first 65 episodes, Warner Bros. Animation outsourced the series to several animation studios around the globe. These studios included Spectrum Animation, Sunrise (Studio 6), Studio Junio, and Tokyo Movie Shinsha in Japan; Dong Yang Animation, Koko Enterprises Ltd., and AKOM in South Korea; Jade Animation in Hong Kong; Blue Pencil in Spain; and Network of Animation (NOA) in Canada. Tokyo Movie Shinsha (TMS) also animated the opening credits for the first season. However, AKOM was fired due to inconsistent animation quality in several episodes, such as "Cat Scratch Fever" and "Moon of the Wolf."

Much of the short film The Dark Knight's First Night was reused for the series introduction. Its final shot, showing Batman overlooking Gotham City with a lightning bolt behind him, evokes both the cover of Frank Miller's Batman: The Dark Knight Returns (1986) and the closing scene of the 1989 Batman film. The credits omit the series title, as Bruce Timm and Tom Ruegger believed Batman's iconic nature made it unnecessary. This decision reflects the creators' intent to tell a story through visuals alone, avoiding expositional dialogue. Similarly, each episode features a unique intertitle, typically designed by Radomski, which conveys themes or significant events without the use of words, staying true to the series' visual storytelling approach.

For season 2, titled The Adventures of Batman & Robin, the twenty episodes were primarily animated by Dong Yang, with exceptions including "A Bullet for Bullock," "Avatar," and "Baby Doll," animated by Studio Junio, and "The Terrible Trio," animated by Jade Animation. The opening credits initially display the season's name before showing several scenes from season one, retaining only the bank explosion from the original credits.

Timm described feeling frustrated by having to realistically draw animated characters in his previous projects: "I knew that at twenty-four drawings per second, each little line had to be drawn thousands of times; the more lines on a character, the less time an animator has to draw those lines correctly, especially on a television budget and schedule. The result: bad animation." As a result, the characters were simplified to facilitate animation—everything had to be reduced to the essentials. For example, instead of Two-Face's plaid shirt, he wears a suit with one side white and the other black to emphasize his internal conflict. Poison Ivy does not wear a leaf-covered costume; instead, she dons a simple one-piece outfit.

During pre-production, character designer Kevin Nowlan stated that his challenge was to convey as much as possible with as few lines as possible. He also mentioned that real people served as inspirations, such as Rhea Perlman for Jesse and George Will for The Ventriloquist. Initially, Nowlan designed The Penguin and The Riddler based on the 1966 Batman series, but his designs were ultimately rejected. Instead, The Penguin's appearance was modeled after his depiction in the film Batman Returns, featuring deformities and slicked-back black hair. Similarly, Catwoman adopted Michelle Pfeiffer's blonde hair. Bruce Wayne's design was inspired by Walter M. Baumhofer's Doc Savage and Dick Tracy, created by Chester Gould. The appearance of the Gray Ghost was largely inspired by the hero The Shadow. Other character inspirations include the Mad Bomber, who was based on Timm, while Charlie Collins was based on Burnett. Harvey Bullock's appearance was inspired by one of the criminals Batman fights in the short film The Dark Knight's First Night. Mr. Freeze was designed by comic concept artist Mike Mignola. In an interview with Back Issue! magazine, Mignola related, "I doubt I spent more than 20 minutes on that. As I recall, I had some old book on the history of DC Comics and there was an old drawing of Mr. Freeze there (that) looked very simple (could have been from the '50s or early '60s), and I just pretty much copied it. I might have done something with the goggles or eyebrows, but that's probably it."

=== Casting ===
The series is notable for its voice cast, with numerous well-known actors providing voices for a variety of recognizable villains. Most notable was Mark Hamill, previously famous for his role as Luke Skywalker in the original Star Wars trilogy, whose prominence as a voice actor was heightened through his "cheerfully deranged" portrayal of the Joker. The role was originally given to Tim Curry, but he developed bronchitis during the initial recording sessions. John Glover, who later voiced the Riddler, also auditioned for the Joker role. Hamill, who found himself to be the biggest fan of the Batman comics among the cast, credited the laughs he had honed on stage in Amadeus with landing him the role. The recording sessions, under the supervision of voice director Andrea Romano, were recorded with the actors together in one studio instead of undergoing separate recordings, as is typical. This method would later be employed for all subsequent series in the DC Animated Universe. Al Pacino was considered to voice Two-Face in the series, but he declined the offer; Richard Moll was instead cast in the role. Other actors included Ron Perlman as Clayface, Roddy McDowall as the Mad Hatter, David Warner as Ra's al Ghul, Michael York as Count Vertigo, Kate Mulgrew as Red Claw, George Murdock as Boss Biggis, Ed Asner as Roland Daggett and George Dzundza as the Ventriloquist. Romano initially wanted Christopher Lee to voice Ra's al Ghul, but since he could not work out his schedule to voice the character, Warner was cast instead.

=== Writing and voice recording ===
One of the intentions of the series was to make the audience feel empathy for Batman's enemies, so even if Batman were to win, the episode was not necessarily a happy ending. Some characters notably had their stories reworked, while others were created for the series. Supposed to appear in a single episode, Harley Quinn remains one of the most successful and impactful characters created in the Batman mythos. First appearing in the episode "Joker's Favor," she serves as the Joker's assistant and sidekick. The character is partly based on the one played by Arleen Sorkin, a friend of Paul Dini, during a dream sequence in an episode of Days of Our Lives. Paul Dini wanted to put a henchwoman with the Joker, similar to what was seen in the 1966 Batman series. Her real name is Harleen Quinzel, and she is named Harley Quinn in reference to the character Harlequin from the commedia dell'arte, whose costume shape she is modeled after. Her black and red colors are inspired by the character Daredevil from the 1940s.

=== Soundtrack ===
The series initially took a variation of music written by Danny Elfman for the Burton films as its theme; later episodes of the series used a new theme with a similar style by Shirley Walker, an occasional collaborator of Elfman. The score of the series was influenced by Elfman's work on the Burton films, as well as the music of 1940s film noir. Walker's work on The Flash series (1990) caught the attention of Timm. Although initially hesitant, she joined the project after being impressed by the show's art and character depth. While collaborating with Elfman to incorporate his Batman film score, she also created her own "memorable" theme for the series.

Walker's approach to composing was notably sophisticated. She crafted character-specific themes based on traits, voice acting, and design, mirroring the techniques of composers like John Williams and Howard Shore. Beyond Batman: The Animated Series, she went on to contribute to Superman: The Animated Series and Batman Beyond, helping to define the sound of the DC Animated Universe.

== Characters ==
=== Main characters ===
- Bruce Wayne / Batman (voiced by Kevin Conroy): The Dark Knight, protector of Gotham City and alter ego of Bruce Wayne.
- Dick Grayson / Robin (voiced by Loren Lester): Batman's loyal protégé and former circus performer and college student.
- Alfred Pennyworth (voiced by Efrem Zimbalist Jr.): Batman's trusted butler and confidant.
  - Clive Revill voiced Alfred in the first three episodes production-wise.
- James Gordon (voiced by Bob Hastings): Gotham City's Police Commissioner and Batman's ally.
- Harvey Bullock (voiced by Robert Costanzo): Gotham City Police detective known for his tough, no-nonsense approach to crime fighting.

=== Supporting characters ===
- Renee Montoya (voiced by Ingrid Oliu in season one, Liane Schirmer in season two): A dedicated officer of the Gotham City Police Department.
- Lucius Fox (voiced by Brock Peters): A high-ranking officer at Wayne Enterprises and a key ally to Batman.
- Summer Gleeson (voiced by Mari Devon): A reporter for the Gotham Gazette.
- Barbara Gordon / Batgirl (voiced by Melissa Gilbert): Commissioner Gordon's daughter and a vigilante in her own right.
- Dr. Leslie Thompkins (voiced by Diana Muldaur): A compassionate physician who often helps Batman and his allies.
- Mayor Hamilton Hill (voiced by Lloyd Bochner): The mayor of Gotham City, occasionally at odds with Batman.
- Veronica Vreeland (voiced by Marilu Henner): A socialite who occasionally interacts with Bruce Wayne and Batman.
- Karl Rossum (voiced by William Sanderson): A scientist and inventor, sometimes involved in shady dealings.
- Jonah Hex (voiced by Bill McKinney): A bounty hunter from the Old West who makes a brief appearance in Gotham.
- Zatanna Zatara (voiced by Julie Brown): A powerful magician and occasional ally of Batman.
- Simon Trent / Gray Ghost (voiced by Adam West): A retired actor who once portrayed a hero on television, later helping Batman.

=== Villains ===
Batman's rogues gallery includes various iconic villains: The Joker, Poison Ivy, Penguin, and more.

- Jack Napier / The Joker (voiced by Mark Hamill): Batman's arch-nemesis and greatest foe, known for his chaotic and unpredictable nature.
- Dr. Harleen Quinzel / Harley Quinn (voiced by Arleen Sorkin): A former psychiatrist turned Joker's accomplice and unpredictable villain.
- Oswald Cobblepot / Penguin (voiced by Paul Williams): A crime boss with a fascination for birds and umbrellas.
- Harvey Dent / Two-Face (voiced by Richard Moll): A former district attorney who turns to crime after an accident disfigures half of his face.
- Selina Kyle / Catwoman (voiced by Adrienne Barbeau): A cat burglar who has a complex relationship with Batman.
- Dr. Pamela Isley / Poison Ivy (voiced by Diane Pershing): A botanist turned villain with the power to control plants and toxins.
- Dr. Jonathan Crane / Scarecrow (voiced by Henry Polic II): A psychologist who uses fear as his weapon.
- Edward Nygma / Riddler (voiced by John Glover): A villain obsessed with riddles and puzzles.
- Ra's al Ghul (voiced by David Warner): A master of martial arts and environmental zealot with plans to destroy humanity.
- Talia al Ghul (voiced by Helen Slater): The daughter of Ra's al Ghul, often in conflict with Batman due to her father's ideals.
- Dr. Victor Fries / Mr. Freeze (voiced by Michael Ansara): A scientist turned villain who attempted to save his wife with cryogenic technology.
- Matthew "Matt" Hagen / Clayface (voiced by Ron Perlman): A shapeshifting criminal whose appearance is tied to his tragic past.
- Waylon Jones / Killer Croc (voiced by Aron Kincaid): A mutant with a crocodile-like appearance who turns to crime.
- Jervis Tetch / Mad Hatter (voiced by Roddy McDowall): A villain obsessed with mind control and Alice in Wonderland.
- Arnold Wesker / The Ventriloquist and Scarface (voiced by George Dzundza): A meek man with a dangerous alter ego, Scarface, his ventriloquist dummy.
- Dr. Robert Kirkland "Kirk" Langstrom / Man-Bat (voiced by Marc Singer and Frank Welker): A scientist who can transform into a bat-like creature.
- Bane (voiced by Henry Silva): A formidable foe who physically and mentally challenges Batman.

=== Supporting villains ===
- Roland Daggett (voiced by Ed Asner): A wealthy businessman involved in shady dealings.
- HARDAC (voiced by Jeff Bennett): A rogue AI determined to replace humanity with robots.
- Hugo Strange (voiced by Ray Buktenica): A psychiatrist turned villain obsessed with Batman.
- Lloyd Ventrix (voiced by Michael Gross): A villain known as Mirror Man who uses his ability to create mirrors for criminal acts.
- Kyodai Ken (voiced by Robert Ito): A skilled martial artist with a vendetta against Bruce Wayne.
- Mary Louise Dahl / Baby-Doll (voiced by Alison La Placa): A former child star with a tragic condition, often using her appearance for evil.
- Dr. Emile Dorian (voiced by Joseph Maher): A scientist who engages in unethical experiments.
- Red Claw (voiced by Kate Mulgrew): A mysterious international terrorist leader.
- Boss Biggis (voiced by George Murdock): A gangster with grand ambitions.
- Sewer King (voiced by Michael Pataki): A villain who controls a group of mutants in the Gotham sewers.
- Temple Fugate / Clock King (voiced by Alan Rachins): A villain obsessed with time and punctuality.
- Maximillian "Maxie" Zeus (voiced by Steve Susskind): A criminal with delusions of godhood.
- Rupert Thorne (voiced by John Vernon): A powerful gangster and businessman in Gotham City.
- Lyle Bolton / Lock-Up (voiced by Bruce Weitz): A former prison guard who takes justice into his own hands.
- Professor Achilles Milo (voiced by Treat Williams): A mad scientist known for creating dangerous weapons.
- Count Werner Vertigo (voiced by Michael York): A criminal mastermind who uses vertigo-inducing technology to control his victims.
- Tony Zucco (voiced by Thomas F. Wilson): A gangster involved in various illegal activities.

== Release ==
=== Television broadcasts ===
Produced by Warner Bros, Batman: The Animated Series features episodes that are typically 22 minutes long, fitting into half-hour time slots. The first season consisted of 65 episodes, and initially premiered in primetime on the Fox network. It began with a special broadcast of the first episode, "On Leather Wings," on September 6, 1992, to promote its upcoming debut on Fox Kids, and to elevate its appeal to a wider audience beyond children. The regular primetime schedule started on December 13, 1992, with the episode "I Am the Night," airing Sundays at 7 PM ET, and the final airing of the series in this primetime block concluding with the episode "Perchance to Dream" on March 14, 1993. The season concluded on September 16, 1993.

The Adventures of Batman & Robin logo

Before all 65 episodes of the first season had aired, Fox renewed the show for a second run of 20 episodes. Seeking to attract younger audiences, particularly boys, the studio required Robin to appear in every episode, leading to changes in the show's visual style, storylines, and title. The series was rebranded as The Adventures of Batman & Robin and later spawned The New Batman Adventures (1997–1999). This shift also influenced planned storylines, including a scrapped episode featuring Catwoman and Black Canary due to Robin's absence.

The Hub Network aired the series from September 6, 2011, to November 29, 2013. The channel aired a 10-episode marathon of the series on July 20, 2012, to coincide with the theatrical release of The Dark Knight Rises and even created an animated version of one of the film's trailers, featuring Kevin Conroy and Adrienne Barbeau re-dubbing Batman and Catwoman's dialogue from the trailer.

=== Home media and streaming ===
The home media releases of the series began with VHS tapes distributed by Warner Home Video in the mid-1990s. These VHS releases were primarily episodic compilations, including titles like The Legend Begins (1992), The Penguin, and Joker's Return (1997), each featuring a selection of episodes centered around specific villains. DVD releases of the series began in the early 2000s, starting with Volume One, which included the first 28 episodes. This was followed by Volume Two, Volume Three, and Volume Four, all subtitled The New Batman Adventures. A complete series box set, featuring all 109 episodes along with commentaries, featurettes, and behind-the-scenes content, was released in 2008.

On October 30, 2018, Warner Bros. released a remastered–Blu-ray edition to celebrate the show's 25th anniversary. This set included all episodes in high-definition, as well as the animated films Batman: Mask of the Phantasm (1993) and Batman & Mr. Freeze: SubZero (1998) as bonus features. The Blu-ray collection also offered digital copies, new featurettes, and collectible art cards.

On September 15, 2018, the series was added to the DC Universe streaming service, featuring both standard-definition and high-definition options. After DC Universe transitioned to a comics-exclusive platform, the series moved to HBO Max on January 1, 2021, as part of WarnerMedia's library.

== Reception ==
=== Critical reception ===
Batman: The Animated Series holds a perfect score on Rotten Tomatoes, with all 21 critics giving it a positive review. The Animated Series is hailed as a landmark in animated television, particularly in the superhero genre, reimagining Gotham City through a film noir lens, and modernizing Batman into a contemporary animated format. The decision to paint animation cels on blackboards to enhance its dark and nocturnal atmosphere was lauded as a groundbreaking visual choice that distinguished it from conventional animated shows. Critics unanimously praised the series for its mature tone, storyline, voice acting, visual aesthetic, and fidelity to the source material; Kevin Conroy's performance as Batman was repeatedly singled out for praise. Scott Mendelson of Forbes praised the series as the best superhero TV show, highlighting its grounded, life-sized drama and realistic portrayal of villains with relatable motivations. Mendelson also discussed how the series addresses real-life issues such as divorce and homelessness, showcasing its maturity and intelligence. Its emphasis on character-driven stories and adult themes has solidified its enduring appeal and established it as the quintessential Batman portrayal. Maya Phillips' of The New York Times highlighted the series' impact on how Batman was portrayed in future media; much like the 1989 film Batman, the series departed from previous campy versions, embracing a darker, more mature narrative influenced by Frank Miller's comics while balancing serious themes with humor. The review applauded the series for revitalizing classic villains and introducing memorable characters like Harley Quinn, cementing its influence on subsequent Batman adaptations, and foreseeing the franchise's enduring popularity across different media platforms.

=== Accolades ===
Award	Year	Category	Nominee(s)	Result	Ref.
Annie Awards	1992	Best Animated Television Program		Nominated	
Annie Awards	1994	Best Animated Television Program		Nominated	
Annie Awards	1994	Best Individual Achievement for Creative Supervision in the Field of Animation	Bruce Timm and Eric Radomski	Nominated	
Annie Awards	1994	Best Individual Achievement for Story Contribution in the Field of Animation	Paul Dini	Nominated	
Annie Awards	1994	Best Achievement for Voice Acting	Mark Hamill	Nominated	
Annie Awards	1995	Best Animated Television Program		Nominated	
Annie Awards	1995	Best Individual Achievement for Music in the Field of Animation	Shirley Walker	Nominated	
Daytime Emmy Awards	1993	Outstanding Animated Program	Jean MacCurdy, Tom Ruegger, Alan Burnett, Eric Radomski, Bruce Timm, Boyd Kirkland, Kevin Altieri, and Frank Paur	Nominated	
Daytime Emmy Awards	1993	Outstanding Writing in an Animated Program	Paul Dini, Martin Pasko, Michael Reaves, and Sean Catherine Derek (for "Heart of Ice")	Won	
Daytime Emmy Awards	1993	Outstanding Film Sound Editing	Thomas Milano, Bob Lacivita, Mark Keatts, Matthew A. Thorne, Aaron L. King, Robert Hargreaves, Jeff M. Sliney, Mike Dickeson, and Russell Brower	Nominated	
Daytime Emmy Awards	1993	Outstanding Music Direction and Composition	Harvey Cohen (for "Cat Scratch Fever")	Nominated	
Daytime Emmy Awards	1993	Outstanding Music Direction and Composition	Shirley Walker (for "Feat of Clay: Part 2")	Nominated	
Daytime Emmy Awards	1994	Outstanding Animated Program	Jean MacCurdy, Tom Ruegger, Alan Burnett, Eric Radomski, Bruce Timm, Frank Paur, and Dan Riba	Nominated	
Daytime Emmy Awards	1994	Outstanding Writing in an Animated Program	Alan Burnett, Laren Bright, Michael Reaves, Paul Dini, Brynne Stephens, Randy Rogel, and Martin Pasko	Nominated	
Daytime Emmy Awards	1995	Outstanding Film Sound Editing	Mark Keatts, Tom Maydeck, Russell Brower, Robert Hargreaves, Matthew A. Thorne, John Hegedes, Daryl B. Kell, J.J. George, and Mike Dickeson	Nominated	
Daytime Emmy Awards	1995	Outstanding Music Direction and Composition	Shirley Walker	Nominated	
Daytime Emmy Awards	1996	Outstanding Music Direction and Composition	Harvey Cohen and Shirley Walker (for "A Bullet for Bullock")	Won	
Daytime Emmy Awards	1996	Outstanding Sound Editing – Special Class	Robert Hargreaves, Matthew A. Thorne, Russell Brower, Mike Dickeson, Bob Lacivita, Tom Maydeck, Mark Keatts, John Hegedes, Patrick Rodman, and Kelly Ann Foley	Won	
Daytime Emmy Awards	1996	Outstanding Sound Mixing – Special Class	Harry Andronis, Matthew A. Thorne, and Tom Maydeck	Nominated	
Online Film & Television Association Awards	2019	Television Hall of Fame: Productions		Inducted	
Primetime Emmy Awards	1993	Outstanding Animated Program (For Programming One Hour or Less)	Jean MacCurdy, Tom Ruegger, Alan Burnett, Eric Radomski, Bruce Timm, Randy Rogel, and Dick Sebast (for "Robin's Reckoning: Part 1")	Won	
Saturn Awards	1993	Best Genre Television Series		Nominated	
Young Artist Awards	1994	Best Youth Actor in a Voice-Over Role: TV or Movie	Scott McAfee	Nominated	

== Legacy ==
Batman: The Animated Series has appeared on several "best of lists" for top animated series. In 1992, Entertainment Weekly ranked the series as one of the top television series of the year. IGN listed the series as the best adaptation of Batman anywhere outside of comics, the best comic book television show of all time, and the second-best animated series of all time (after The Simpsons). Wizard magazine also ranked it No. 2 of the greatest animated television shows of all time (again after The Simpsons). TV Guide ranked it the seventh-greatest cartoon of all time.

In his reference book, Batman: The Complete History, Les Daniels described The Animated Series as coming "as close as any artistic statement has to defining the look of Batman for the 1990s." Animation historian Charles Solomon gave the series a somewhat mixed assessment, commenting that "the dark, Art Deco-influenced backgrounds tended to eclipse the stiff animation and pedestrian storytelling" and concluding that the series "looked better in stills than it did on the screen."

Several new characters and other revamped backstories introduced in the series later made their way into comics and other media. Most notable was Harley Quinn, who was initially introduced in the Batman: The Animated Series episode "Joker's Favor", with the character being inspired and voiced by Arleen Sorkin. The character made her canonical comic book appearance in 1999 and is now one of the most popular characters in DC universe. The show is also known for the reinvention of Mr. Freeze in the episode "Heart of Ice" , where he was changed from a laughing stock to a tragic villain.

The dark atmosphere, mature themes, and even some of the voice cast from the series are employed in the Batman: Arkham video game series. Kevin Conroy and Mark Hamill reprise their respective roles in Rocksteady Studios Main Trilogy (Arkham Asylum, Arkham City, and Arkham Knight), with Arleen Sorkin and Robert Costanzo also reprising their character roles respectively in both Asylum and Arkham Origins. Furthermore, the first two games are co-written by series veteran Paul Dini. Also, Batman's design and costume in The Animated Series are featured as an alternate skin in Batman: Arkham City. These skins are available as downloadable content; they were also available in pre-orders at GameStop and a valid membership to Power-Up Rewards. There are also Animated-inspired alternate skins for Catwoman, Nightwing, and Robin. Actor Robert Pattinson, who portrays Batman in The Batman (2022), has cited Batman: Mask of the Phantasm as an example of Batman media that effectively captured the character's psyche in a fashion he hoped his interpretation would emulate. The series is a key inspiration for the 2024 animated series Batman: Caped Crusader, again developed by Bruce Timm.

== Related media ==
=== Canceled projects ===
A Catwoman spin-off series based on Batman: The Animated Series was briefly considered by the Fox network in the early 1990s. Despite some initial production work, the project was eventually canceled. Another continuation of the series was in development as an audio podcast drama, with most of the original cast returning along with writer Alan Burnett, but the project was put on hold following Kevin Conroy's passing.

=== Feature films ===
- Batman: Mask of the Phantasm (1993) – based on The Animated Series; the film started production as a direct-to-video release, but was ultimately changed into a theatrical release. Although the film was not a financial success upon its initial release, it earned widespread acclaim and has since become a commercial success through its various home media releases.
- Batman & Mr. Freeze: SubZero (1998) – a direct-to-video release, which was produced as a tie-in to the 1997 film Batman & Robin. SubZero's release was delayed until the following year due to Batman & Robin failing to meet commercial and critical expectations.

=== Follow–ups ===
The DC Animated Universe (DCAU) began with Batman: The Animated Series in 1992, which became a critical and fan favorite. Its success led to Superman: The Animated Series (1996), followed by The New Batman Adventures, which debuted in 1997 as a direct sequel to BTAS with a revamped animation style to align with Superman: The Animated Series. The sequel also featured several crossovers with Batman's world.

This sequel served as a bridge between the Fox-era Batman and later DCAU spinoffs on The WB and Cartoon Network. Though initially a distinct series, it is now regarded as the third season of Batman: The Animated Series, bringing the Batman storyline into alignment with the broader universe and paving the way for future series like Justice League and Batman Beyond. The DCAU continued to expand with the kid-friendly Static Shock and Zeta Project, further expanding its world. In 2001, Justice League united Superman, Batman, and five other heroes, leading to Justice League Unlimited—a sprawling series that celebrated DC Comics by introducing a vast array of characters and storylines.

=== Comic adaptations ===
Batman: The Animated Series was accompanied by a tie-in comic book, The Batman Adventures, which followed the art style and continuity of the show rather than other Batman comic books. This comic series, through various format changes reflecting the evolving world of the show and its spin-offs, outlasted the series itself by nearly a decade. It was ultimately canceled in 2004 as part of a broader effort to conclude the DC Animated Universe. One notable milestone of The Batman Adventures was the first official comic appearance of the character Harley Quinn in issue No. 12, which has since become highly sought after by collectors and fans. DC announced in February 2020 that Paul Dini, Alan Burnett and artist Ty Templeton would be leading a new miniseries titled Batman: The Adventures Continue, set to be published in April 2020. This new series is based on the animated series and follows shortly after its conclusion, featuring Tim Drake as he adjusts to his role as the new Robin alongside Batman.

=== Novels ===
There was also a short-lived series of tie-in novels, adapted from episodes of the series by science fiction author Geary Gravel. To achieve novel length, Gravel combined several related episodes into a single storyline in each novel. The novels included:

- Shadows of the Past ("Appointment in Crime Alley", "Robin's Reckoning" two-parter) (1993)
- Mask of the Phantasm (Batman: Mask of the Phantasm) (1993)
- Dual to the Death ("Two-Face" two-parter, "Shadow of the Bat" two-parter) (1994)
- The Dragon and the Bat ("Night of the Ninja", "Day of the Samurai") (1994)

=== Video games ===
Several video games based on the animated continuity were released during the 16-bit game-machine era, using The Adventures of Batman & Robin second season branding. Konami developed a game for the Super Nintendo Entertainment System (SNES), while Sega released versions of the game for the Genesis/Mega Drive, Mega-CD, and Game Gear. The SNES, Genesis/Mega Drive, and Game Gear versions were side-scrolling action games, while the Mega-CD version featured a 3-D driving adventure. All the games had art true to the series, while Sega's versions featured art elements directly from the show's creators. The CD version has over 20 minutes of original animated footage comparable to the most well-crafted episodes, with the principal voice actors reprising their roles.

There was also a game made for the Game Boy based on the series and created around the same time. Developed and published by Konami, this game was distinctive in the fact that it still used the earlier Batman: The Animated Series moniker instead of The Adventures of Batman & Robin second season title given to the other games.

In Lego DC Super-Villains, a downloadable content level was released, based on the Batman: Mask of the Phantasm film, and contained some characters from the show, including the Batman: The Animated Series version of Batman, The Joker, Harley Quinn, Two-Face, Andrea Beaumont as The Phantasm, The Mad Hatter, Man-Bat, and Captain Clown. Kevin Conroy and Mark Hamill reprise their roles as Batman and Joker respectively.

=== Merchandise ===
In the 1990s, toy manufacturer Kenner released a range of action figures and vehicles inspired by the television series. Aimed primarily at children, these toys have become real collector's items twenty years later. To commemorate Batman's 75th anniversary, DC Collectibles released a line of articulated figurines in October 2014, featuring the characters from the series. These are not toys but rather collectible figurines. 22 characters were released by the end of 2015.
