= Static Shock =

American animated TV series (2000–04)

- Genre: Action-adventure, Comedy, Science fiction & Superhero
- Based on: Static by Dwayne McDuffie, Denys Cowan, Michael Davis, Derek T. Dingle, Christopher Priest, Milestone Media & DC Comics
- Developed by: Christopher Simmons (season 2)
- Voices of: Phil LaMarr, Jason Marsden, Kevin Michael Richardson & Michele Morgan
- Theme music composer: Stanley Clarke (season 1), Richard Wolf (season 2), & Lil' Romeo & Master P (seasons 3–4)
- Opening theme: Theme (seasons 1–2) & "Static Shock Superhero" Theme (seasons 3–4)
- Composers: Stanley Clarke (season 1), Richard Wolf (seasons 2–3), Max Gousse (season 4) & Derryck "Big Tank" Thornton (season 4)
- Country of origin: United States
- Original language: English
- No. of seasons: 4
- No. of episodes: 52 (list of episodes)

Production
- Executive producers: Jean MacCurdy (seasons 1–2) & Sander Schwartz (seasons 2–4)
- Producers: Scott Jeralds (seasons 1–2), (seasons 3–4) & Swinton O. Scott III (seasons 3–4)
- Editors: Joe Gall (seasons 2–4) & Derrick Mitchell (season 3)
- Running time: 22 minutes
- Production companies: Warner Bros. Family Entertainment; Warner Bros. Animation (Note: Credited as Warner Bros. Television Animation from 2000 to 2003.)

Original release
- Network: Kids' WB
- Release: September 23, 2000 – May 22, 2004

Related
- The New Batman/Superman Adventures; DC animated universe television series

Static Shock is an American animated superhero television series based on the Milestone Media/DC Comics superhero Static. It premiered on September 23, 2000, on the WB Television Network's Kids' WB programming block. Static Shock ran for four seasons, with 52 half-hour episodes in total. The show revolves around Virgil Hawkins, a 14-year-old boy who uses the secret identity of "Static" after exposure to a mutagen gas during a gang fight which gave him electromagnetic powers. It was the first time that an African-American superhero was the titular character of their own broadcast animation series. (Note: Although Static was not the first black superhero to feature on a television show, Static Shock was the first series to have an African-American superhero as its lead character.)

Static Shock was produced by Warner Bros. Animation from a crew composed mostly of people from the company's past shows, but also with the involvement of two of the comic's creators, Dwayne McDuffie and Denys Cowan. Static Shock had some alterations from the original comic book because it was oriented to a pre-teen audience. Although originally not intended to be part of the DC Animated Universe, it was incorporated into it in the second season.

The show approached several social issues, which was positively received by most television critics. Static Shock was nominated for numerous awards, including the Daytime Emmy. Some criticism was directed towards its humor and animation, which was said to be unnatural and outdated. The series also produced some related merchandise, which sold poorly; McDuffie cited the low sales as one of the main factors behind the series' cancellation. In spite of this, its popularity revived interest in the original Milestone comic and introduced McDuffie to the animation industry.

== Plot ==
Virgil Hawkins is a 14-year-old boy who lives with his older sister Sharon and their widowed father Robert in Dakota City. He attends high school with his best friend Richie Foley, and has a crush on a girl named Frieda. He also has a dispute with a bully named Francis Stone, nicknamed "F-Stop." A gang leader named Wade recently helped Virgil, hoping to recruit him, but Virgil is hesitant, as he knows his mother died in an exchange of gunfire between gangs. Wade eventually leads Virgil to a restricted area for a fight against F-Stop's crew, but it was interrupted by police helicopters. During the dispute with the police, chemical containers explode, releasing a gas called Quantum Vapor that causes mutations among the people in the vicinity (this event was later known as the "Big Bang"). As a result, Virgil obtains the ability to create, generate, absorb, and control electricity and magnetism—he takes up the alter-ego of "Static". The gas also gives others in the area their own powers, and several of them become supervillains known as "Bang Babies". Static fights the villains Bang Babies and also the occasional machinations of Edwin Alva whose company Alva Industries created the Quantum Vapor.

== Characters ==
- Virgil Hawkins / Static (voiced by Phil LaMarr) – A high school student in Dakota City. As a result of accidental exposure to an experimental mutagen in an event known as the Big Bang, he gained the ability to control and manipulate electromagnetism, and uses these powers to become the superhero "Static". Countless others who were also exposed also gained a wide variety of mutations and abilities, and Static spends much of his time dealing with these "Bang Babies", many of whom use their abilities in selfish, harmful, and even criminal ways.
- Richie Foley / Gear (voiced by Jason Marsden) – Virgil's best friend and confidant. At first, he merely provides support for his friend, making gadgets for him and helping protect his secret identity. In the third season, Richie develops superhuman intelligence from prolonged passive exposure to the Big Bang gas and becomes the superhero Gear.
- Robert Hawkins (voiced by Kevin Michael Richardson) – A social worker who runs the Freeman Community Center as head counselor. He is a widower and the single father of two teenagers—Virgil and Sharon. A strict but caring and genuinely understanding parent, he dislikes gangs and the destructive attitudes of most Bang Babies, and his work at the community center is motivated by a desire to counteract their bad influence.
- Sharon Hawkins (voiced by Michele Morgan) – Virgil's older sister, who attends college, but she still lives at home. She volunteers at a hospital, and counsels young people at the Freeman Community Center. While they do argue frequently, Sharon and Virgil really do care about each other and are quick to come to the other's defense if one of them is in danger.
- Adam Evans / Rubberband Man (voiced by Kadeem Hardison) – A Bang Baby whose body structure consists of shapeable rubber. He is the younger brother of Ebon. Rubberband Man first appears as a tragic villain when he goes after an opportunistic record producer who stole one of his songs. He subsequently breaks out of prison, but decides not to pursue a criminal career. He and Sharon eventually start dating, with Sharon helping Adam turn over a new leaf. He and Virgil initially clash, but Virgil comes to accept Adam's relationship with his sister, and they become allies in crime-fighting, with Adam becoming an older-brother figure to Virgil.
- Francis Stone / Hot-Streak (voiced by Danny Cooksey) - A Bang Baby who was an enemy of Virgil long before they gained their respective superpowers. Prior to the "Big Bang," Francis was a local bully and gang leader known as "F-Stop". He and his gang would antagonize Virgil, being stopped only by his rival Wade. As a result of the Big Bang, he gained pyrokinesis that allow him to ignite fire at will, which lead to him and Static clashing on a daily basis.
- Ivan Evans / Ebon (voiced by Gary Anthony Sturgis) – The head of a large group of Bang Babies called "The Meta-Breed" and the series' main antagonist. Ebon is an unusually powerful metahuman able to create portals and manipulate pure darkness and shadows.

== Production ==
The series was produced by Warner Bros. Animation based on the Milestone Media/DC Comics character Static. Its supervising producer was Alan Burnett, and Scott Jeralds was the main producer under executive producers Jean MacCurdy and Sander Schwartz. The production team consisted mostly of people who were involved with Batman: The Animated Series and Superman: The Animated Series, but also included Static's co-creator Denys Cowan. Although the show hired the comic series' co-creator Dwayne McDuffie as story editor and writer, McDuffie had no direct involvement on the development of Static Shock. The idea of a Static series first emerged with DC's editor-in-chief Jenette Kahn during the time McDuffie was working for Milestone under Kahn. In 1993, Kahn proposed to adapt some Milestone comics; Burnett was hired to write a pilot episode for an X-Men-esque series with Milestone superheroes called The New Guard. After attempts to produce several other Milestone projects, Static was eventually the series "they went for". By the time Milestone and DC drafted their contract over DC distributing Milestone comics, the characters were from separate fictional universes. However, when crossovers between Static Shock and other DC animated series were suggested, it was established that they were from the same DC Animated Universe—"rather than having to muck around with multiple dimensions, or whatever."

Although McDuffie stressed that the show remains loyal to "the spirit and the tone" of the comic book, some changes were done because of its timeslot and target audience of pre-teens. (Note: Leonard Pierce of the A.V. Club even considered it to be "the most kid-oriented of all the [DC animated universe] franchise's shows," and "much more appealing to a younger audience than Batman, Superman, or Justice League", for example.) For example, guns appeared less frequently, Richie is not explicitly portrayed as homosexual, (Note: Dwayne McDuffie commented on this issue, "It'll never come up in the show because it's Y-7 but as far as I'm concerned, Richie is gay [...]. The way I dealt with Richie's homosexuality was to write him aggressively and unconvincingly announcing his heterosexuality whenever possible ('Wow! Look at those girls in the swimsuits! I sure like girls!'), while Virgil rolled his eyes at the transparency of it".) and he is Virgil's confidant instead of Frieda. Virgil is also younger in the animated series, his costumes and use of his powers are different from the original, and his mother is dead in the show despite the fact that she is alive in the comics. The latter change was done because producers had the intention "to focus on a strong, complex relationship between an African-American father and son." Nevertheless, McDuffie was concerned by the change because he originally intended to oppose the stereotype of black people not having a complete nuclear family. However, McDuffie said "that [it] worked out okay" as the crew could use the absence of Virgil's mother to create a "couple of great stories". Virgil's father, Robert, "for all intents and purposes, is a new character", as he was reconceptualized as a social worker. The same goes for Richie, who is described as an amalgam of different characters from the original comic. For the villains, Hotstreak was reused from the Static comics, Edwin Alva was brought from another Milestone's series—Hardware—, and the Meta-Breed was created for the series.

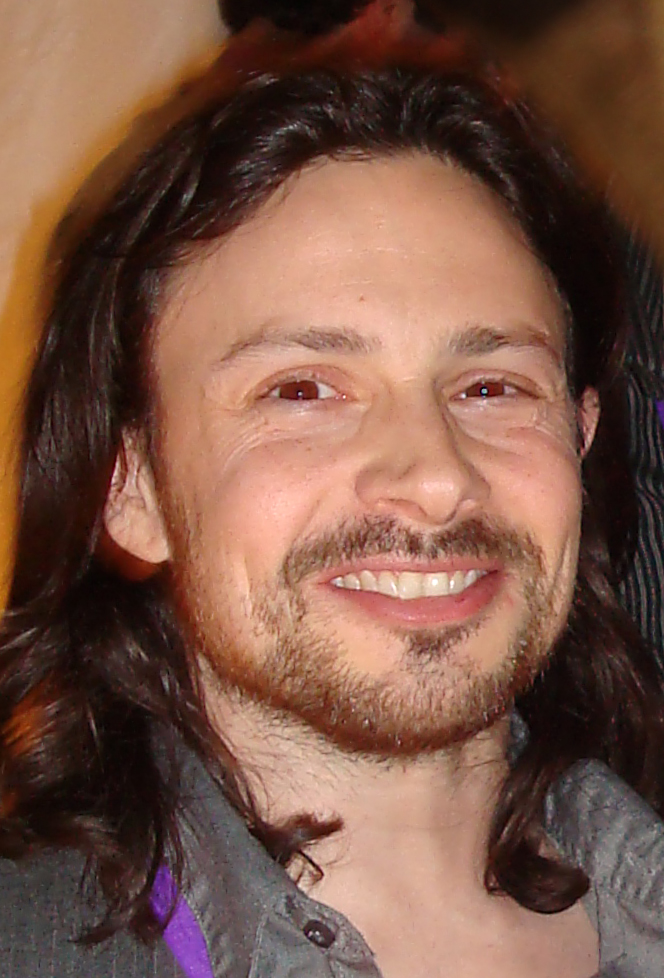
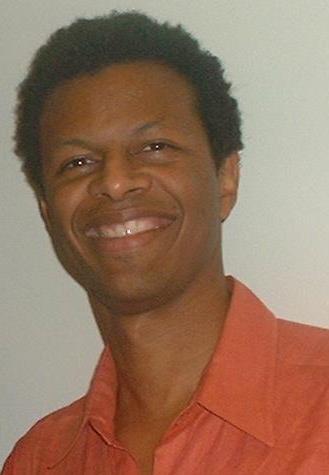
The third season marks Richie becoming the superhero Gear. This was done partially because it was becoming hard to fit him into the story and the producers wanted to keep the "chemistry" between voice actors Phil LaMarr (right) and Jason Marsden.

The third season saw some of the biggest changes; in addition to Richie's superpowers and a new opening, Static changed his costume. Cowan stated that the change was done to give his clothes a "feel of the comic book", while McDuffie said it represented a growth that Virgil was passing through. This maturation made possible to "explore some of the darker places in his world," and to have more varied conflicts, as the villains have also become more mature. He described it is as "a natural outgrowth of all that, as is the new, more naturalistic look of the show." This change followed the second-season premiere—"The Big Leagues"—when Static meets Batman and Robin. Burnett said, "after that show, everybody went, 'Let's go in that direction.'" Writer John Semper Jr. commented, "of course, I always lean toward the dramatic ... But the same old light-hearted Static spirit is still there." Richie gains superpowers because it was becoming hard to fit him into the story and the producers wanted to keep the "chemistry" between voice actors Phil LaMarr and Jason Marsden. There was also a positive response from children in focus groups so "[t]he answer seemed pretty obvious."

The series' music director was Richard Wolf, while he, Stanley Clarke and Max Gousse were the composers, and Kennard Ramsey was the orchestrator. For action sequences, Wolf wanted to use "real adrenaline-pumping beat" of 125 beats per minute; however, hip hop music usually only reached 110 beats. The predominant score was electronica with hip hop-type and DMX-type vocals. R&B and old school hip hop melodies were also used depending on the scenes, and each character had a specific theme. Wolf composed the opening theme for the first two seasons. Starting from the third season, the show had a new opening theme, written by Master P and Lil' Romeo and performed by the latter.

Static Shock's episodes handle different issues, including gangs, gun violence, homelessness, bullying, racism, mental illness, bigotry, and drugs. Other episodes also featured the subject of Hanukkah and Christmas celebrations. The series was also marked by several crossover episodes with characters from the DC Animated Universe like Superman, Green Lantern, the Justice League, and the Batman Beyond cast. Several episodes also featured guest voice actors, including basketballers (like Shaquille O'Neal and Karl Malone) and musicians, such as the B2K group, Romeo Miller, and AJ McLean. Guest crew was also featured, including cartoonist Rick Hoberg as storyboard artist, and Paul Dini and John Ridley as writers.

== Episodes ==
Season	Episodes	Originally released		
Season	Episodes	First released	Last released	Network
1	13	September 23, 2000	May 12, 2001	Kids' WB
2	11	January 26, 2002	May 4, 2002	Kids' WB
3	15	January 25, 2003	June 21, 2003	Kids' WB
4	13	January 17, 2004	May 22, 2004	Kids' WB

== Release ==
Static Shock aired on the Kids' WB programming block of The WB from September 23, 2000, until May 22, 2004. The first African American superhero–centered television series, it ran a total of 52 episodes. The series later premiered on Cartoon Network, starting in December 2001, and on Disney XD in February 2009. The first six episodes were released to DVD on September 28, 2004, in a single volume entitled "The New Kid". The complete first season was made available for download on iTunes on July 4, 2011. In 2017, Warner Bros. started to release Static Shock's complete seasons on manufacture on demand DVDs as a part of the Warner Archive Collection. The first season was published on March 28; the second season on May 23; the third on January 30, 2018; and the fourth on April 13, 2018. Starting in September 2018, all episodes of the series have been made available on the DC Universe digital streaming service. The series began streaming on HBO Max sometime in 2021, but was removed from the service on January 1, 2025, thus making it one of two DCAU series currently not available on HBO Max (the other series being The Zeta Project). In addition, the entire series is available for digital purchase, either individually or in a complete series pack such as on iTunes.

Static Shock was an extremely popular show, granting its new renewal for a second season just a month after its debut. As of December 2000, it was the highest-rated preteen show (from 2 to 11 years old) among all networks on its timeslot, and the third highest on the Kids' WB! lineup. From its debut to July 2003, the show secured the second post among boys aged 6 to 11 years. Ratings increased after Richie Foley obtained superpowers; McDuffie affirmed that this is what secured the renewal for a new season. Indeed, the show's third season was its most popular and was the second best-rated Saturday morning program among boys aged 6 to 11 years, and tweens and male tweens aged 9 to 14. From February to April 2003, ratings regularly performed over the 4.0 stake among the public aged 9 to 14 years; it even reached the 6.4 mark in May. Static Shock's last season was only surpassed by the children's anime Pokémon, and the show's reruns on Cartoon Network were only surpassed by the adult animated sitcom Family Guy. Static Shock was the only program on Cartoon Network to be among the top 30 most watched kids shows in a week of October 2004. It was also the best rated program of the channel among kids on a week of January 2005, and the best rated show on Cartoon Network's Miguzi block as of March 2005. For the 2004–05 season, it was the 18th most watched Saturday morning children's show of all networks. Static Shock was ultimately cancelled due to the low production of merchandise.

== Reception ==
=== Accolades ===
Static Shock's episode "The Big Leagues" earned director Dave Chlystek a nomination for Outstanding Achievement for Directing in an Animated Television Production at the 2002 Annie Awards. This episode was also nominated for a Golden Reel Award for Best Sound Editing in Television Animation in 2003. That same year, McDuffie and Burnett were awarded the Humanitas Prize in the Children's Animation Category for the episode "Jimmy". At the 30th Daytime Emmy Awards in 2003, the show was nominated for Special Class Animated Program and Richard Wolf was nominated for Achievement in Music Direction and Composition. At the 31st Daytime Emmy Awards in 2004, both the animated series and Wolf were again nominated for the same categories—this time, Wolf won the award.

=== Reviews ===
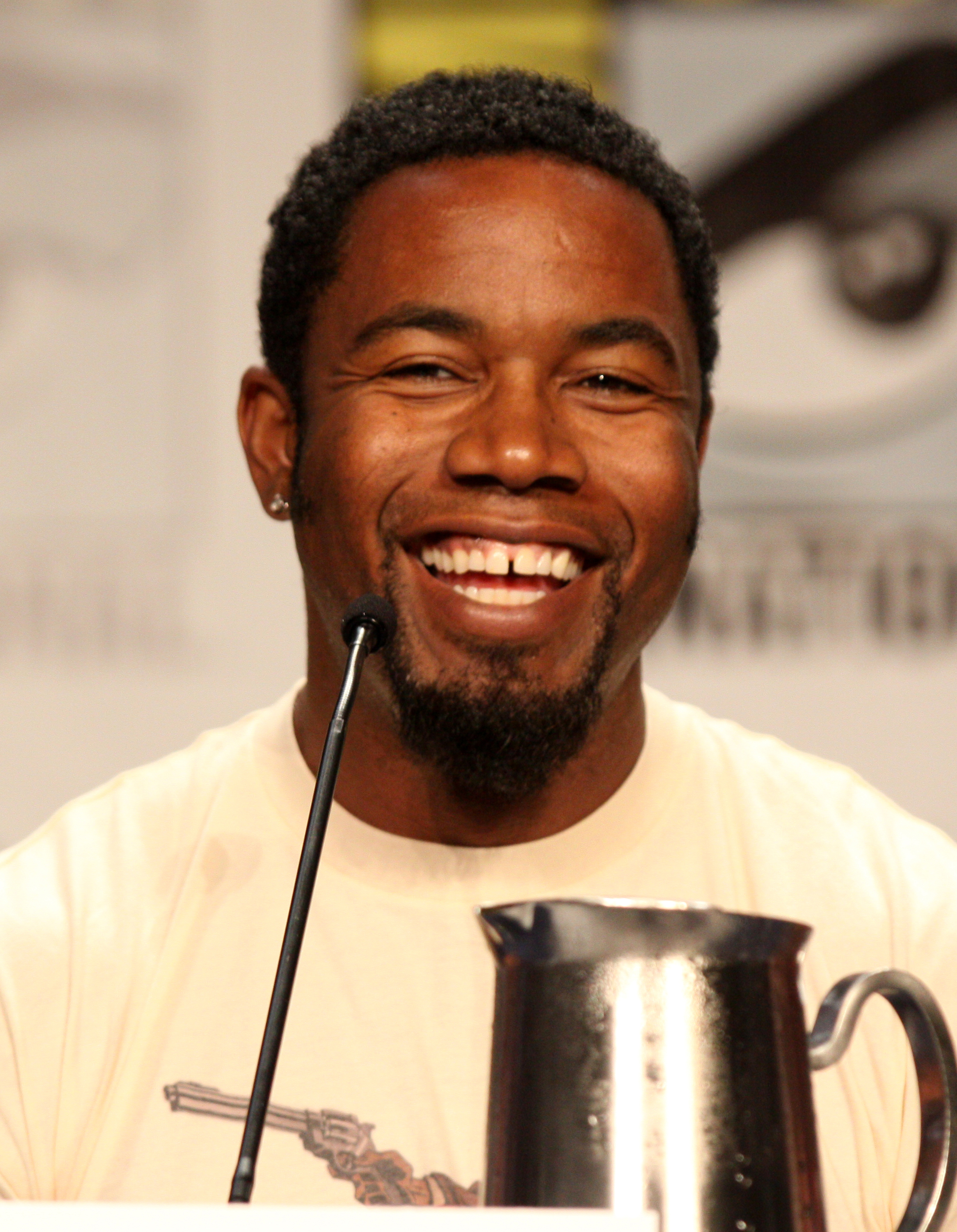
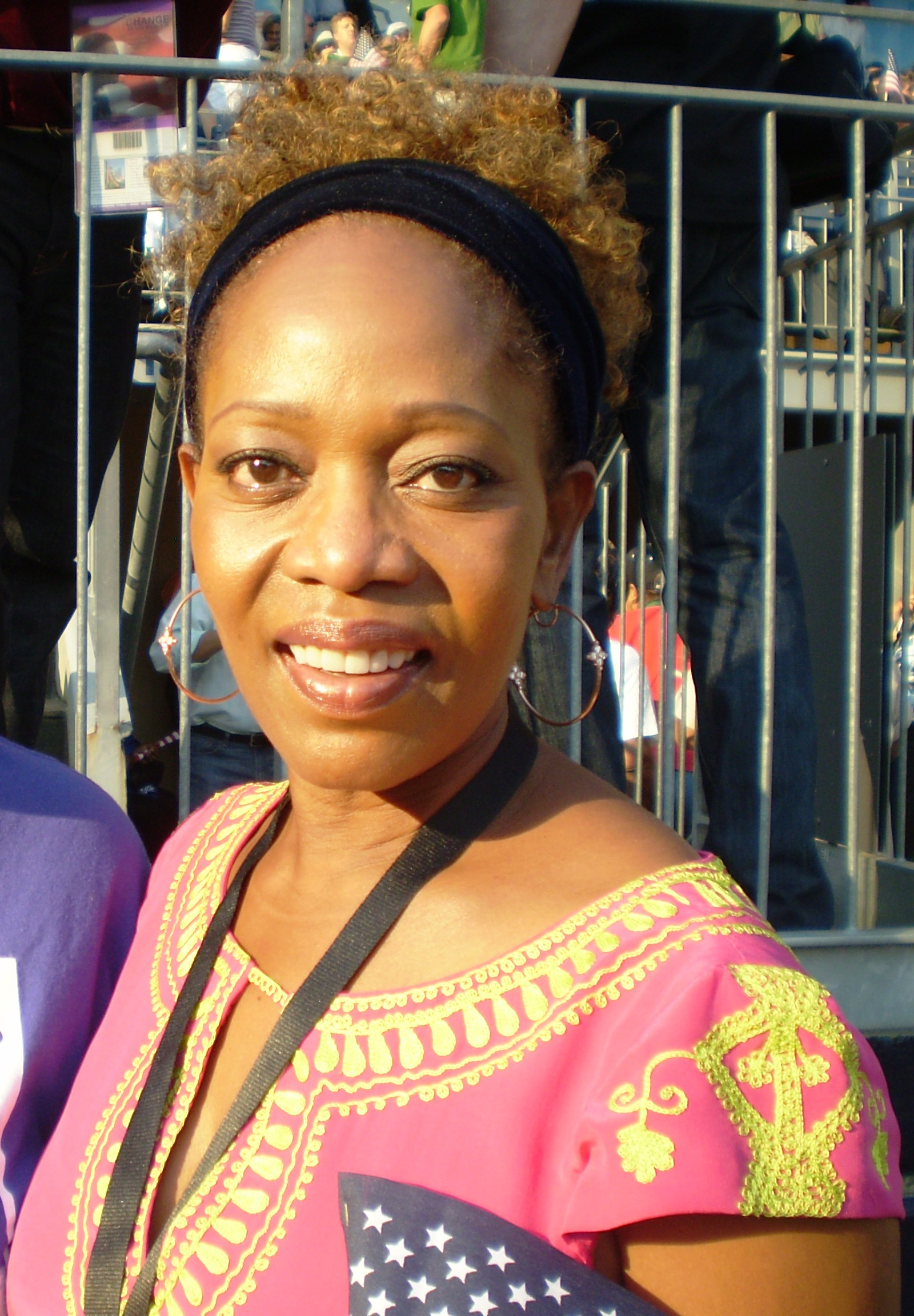
Although he noted that Static Shock did not feature the very first African-American superhero, Andy Mangels affirmed it was the first to have a diverse roster of characters and cast members as well. For example, Michael Jai White (left) portrays Osebo in the episode "Static in Africa", while Alfre Woodard appears as Virgil's mother in "Flashback".

The review aggregator Rotten Tomatoes only provides an average score for the series' first season; it reports a 75% approval rating based on eight reviews. Leonard Pierce of The A.V. Club described it as "a surprising and sometimes rewarding success". October 2001 issue of Wizard listed the 100 best cartoon shows ever as selected by their readers, with Static Shock ranked at number 88. Jonathon Dornbush, in a 2014 Entertainment Weekly article, included it among the nine best comics-based animated TV series. He asserted, "Static Shock didn't have quite the name recognition of its DC brethren when it debuted, but the show proved it could stand alongside the greats." Charlie Jane Anders, for io9, ranked it 91st on a list of the best science fiction and fantasy shows; she commented, "amidst a glut of superhero cartoons, this is one of the most memorable."

In The Superhero Book, Andy Mangels praised Static Shock's multicultural approach, while Emily Ashby from Common Sense Media lauded it for encouraging diversity. Mangels declared that "Static Shock provides solid superheroic entertainment and a role model and promotion of diversity for not only African-American viewers, but for audiences of all colors and ages." Writing for Entertainment Weekly, Monique Jones praised the series for a positive depiction not only of an African American superhero but of an African country—Ghana. Jones also commended how the series incorporated social issues in "an easily digestible" way without having to "sugarcoat" them. Lynne Heffley of Los Angeles Times commented it "isn't your typical Saturday-morning cartoon series", praising its themes and electing the episode "Jimmy"—about gun violence—as an example. Evan Levine, writing for Rome News-Tribune, asserted that "the series is at its best when it confronts issues actually facing kids."

Jones commended Virgil's portrayal as an everyman teenager, while Ashby appreciated Virgil's "relatable" character. Colby Lanham of Comic Book Resources said Virgil "was perhaps the most human of many superheroes on television at the time" and considered the series was canceled too soon. Ashby was also positive to the fact that Virgil usually counted on dialogues before going into action; this action was also praised by John Sinnott of DVD Talk, who said it is "something that most animated heroes never think to do." Ashby also applauded Virgil's "surprising depth of character" to not follow a gang but to use his powers for good.

While Levine praised "its bright, cartoony visuals [that] are a notch above those of many other animated series," Sinnott considered some of the animation to be "a little stilted." Sinnott called it "a fun series overall", but considered some jokes to be "a little stale". Neil Dorsett of DVD Verdict was generally disappointed; he called voice acting "very standard", and said that "artwork and animation are also both behind the times". Dorsett also criticized Virgil's one-lines, which "invites, like many other elements of the series, comparison to Spider-Man." He, however, pondered that his opinion may come from a bad first impression: "Although there are lots of things to nitpick about the show, there's not really anything wrong with it." Both Sinnott and Dorsett compared it unfavorably to the original comic book.

Entertainment Weekly's Ken Tucker questioned why The WB made a TV show based on a cancelled, poorly-sold comic and criticized the "uttering tired, condescending lines" professed by Virgil. Nancy Imperiale Wellons from the Orlando Sentinel said "Virgil has a believable relationship with his family -- including a strong father figure -- but the show's pacing lags." Paul Schultz wrote for the New York Daily News that "Many of the characters -- the conservative, the annoying sister -- are cliches." Thelma Adams criticized the show in the New York Post; first she called it "formulaic but appealing" and ultimately dubbed it "lame".

== Legacy ==
The show's popularity led to new demand for Milestone's Static comics: the first four issues of it were reissued as Static Shock: Trial by Fire in 2000 and a miniseries, Static Shock!: Rebirth of the Cool, was released between January and September 2001. It also led to the production of an unreleased video game, toys, and books. In May 2003, Midway Games announced the production of a platform game based on the show for the Game Boy Advance. Although it was displayed at the Electronic Entertainment Expo, the game was later cancelled. For a period starting on July 4, 2004, Subway Restaurants released a series of toys based on the TV series to be offered in the United States and Canada. On September 1, 2004, Scholastic Corporation published two tie-in children's books written by Tracey West.

McDuffie's work on Static Shock placed him in the circles of animated series, and he became a writer and producer for shows like Justice League, Teen Titans, Justice League Unlimited, and Ben 10: Alien Force. McDuffie was responsible for diversifying the DC animated universe's Justice League by including black and female characters. Moreover, Arie Kaplan credits McDuffie and his co-writers for giving "a depth and complexity" the group was lacking since the 1970s. A future, older version of Virgil appeared in the Justice League Unlimited episode "The Once and Future Thing, Part 2: Time, Warped" in January 2005.

== Home media ==
As part of the DC Animated Universe, a compilation DVD was released on DVD on September 28, 2004.

The Complete First Season was released on DVD on March 28, 2017. The Complete Second Season was released on DVD on May 23, 2017. The Complete Third Season was released on DVD on January 30, 2018. The Complete Fourth Season was released on DVD on April 13, 2018.
