= Milestone Returns =

Ongoing DC Comics series

- Official cover for Milestone Returns #0

Publication information
- Publisher: DC Comics
- Genre: Superhero
- Publication date: September 2020 – February 2025
- Main character: Earth-M (Milestone Universe)

Milestone Returns or Earth-M is a relaunch of American comic books published by DC Comics that began in September 2020. The line features reimagined versions of the fictional characters and shared universe of Milestone Media by Denys Cowan, Michael Davis, Derek T. Dingle and Dwayne McDuffie.

== Publication history ==
=== Background ===
In a January 2015 interview, writer Reginald Hudlin discussed a relaunch of Milestone Media Group, along with surviving co-founders Denys Cowan and Derek Dingle. The following July, DC Comics announced the creation of "Earth-M" within their multiverse, which would be home to the earlier Milestone characters as well as new ones, and that one or two Earth M imprint titles would be published annually, as well as miniseries and one-shots. No further developments took place until October 2017, when it was revealed that Milestone would be returning in 2018 with five titles, including Milestone (featuring Icon and Rocket), a new Static series, Duo (based on the character Xombi), and two other new titles: Earth-M and Love Army. Charlotte Fullerton, Dwayne McDuffie's widow who inherited his 50% share in the original Milestone Media company, sued in August 2017 over being excluded from the revived company despite the new Milestone taking over the original's Milestone IPs.

=== Development ===
In 2020, Earth-M was retitled as Milestone Returns, with the initial issue being published in September. An extended version was published in February 2021. The issues are available in print, digitally, and on DC Universe Infinite since April 2021.

== Setting ==
Milestone Returns is set in Earth-M, which is officially non-canon to the DC Universe. In Dark Crisis: Big Bang, Earth-M is designated as Earth-93 in the Multiverse.

In Earth-M, famous characters like Static, Icon, Rocket, Hardware, and several others have new origin stories related to the Big Bang, the event that happened in Dakota City. While they still do not know each other, the enigmatic Dharma prepares them in secret for a war to come.

== List of titles ==
Title	Issue(s)	Writer(s)	Artist(s)	Colorist(s)	Premiere date	Finale date	Ref.
=== Prelude ===
Milestone Returns	#0	Reginald Hudlin; Greg Pak	Ryan Benjamin; Denys Cowan; Scott Hanna; Don Ho; Jim Lee; Jimmy Palmiotti; Khoi Pham; Bill Sienkiewicz	Hi-Fi; Alex Sinclair; Chris Sotomayor	September 13, 2020		
Milestone Returns: Infinite Edition	#0	Reginald Hudlin	ChrisCross; Denys Cowan; Nikolas Draper-Ivey; Bill Sienkiewicz; Juan Castro	Nikolas Draper-Ivey; Wil Quintana; Chris Sotomayor	February 24, 2021		
=== Year 1 ===
Static: Season One	#1–6	Vita Ayala	ChrisCross	Nikolas Draper-Ivey	June 15, 2021	March 1, 2022	
Icon and Rocket: Season One	#1–6	Reginald Hudlin	Doug Braithwaite; Andrew Currie; Scott Hanna	Brad Anderson	July 27, 2021	March 22, 2022	
Hardware: Season One	#1–6	Brandon Thomas	Denys Cowan; Bill Sienkiewicz	Chris Sotomayor	August 10, 2021	May 31, 2022	
=== Year 2 ===
Blood Syndicate: Season One	#1–6	Geoffrey Thorne	Juan Castro; ChrisCross	Wil Quintana	May 10, 2022	October 25, 2022	
Duo	#1–6	Greg Pak	Scott Hanna; Khoi Pham	Chris Sotomayor	May 17, 2022	October 18, 2022	
Milestones in History	#1	Steve Barnes; Pat Charles; Amy Chu; Melody Cooper; Tananarive Due; Karyn Parsons; Alice Randall; Touré	Eric Battle; Francesco Francavilla; Mike Gustovich; Ray-Anthony Height; Don Hudson; Jamal Yaseem Igle; Arvell Jones; Jose Marzan Jr. Maria Laura Sanapo; Dominike "Domo" Stanton; Ron Wilson	Michael Atiyeh; Dan Brown; Andrew Dalhouse; Eva de la Cruz; Francesco Francavilla; Hi-Fi; Emilio Lopez; Chris Sotomayor	June 21, 2022		
=== Year 3 ===
Static: Shadows of Dakota	#1–7	Vita Ayala	ChrisCross	Nikolas Draper-Ivey	February 7, 2023	November 28, 2023	
Icon vs. Hardware	#1–5	Leon Chills; Reginald Hudlin	Denys Cowan; Yasmin Flores Montanez	John Floyd; Chris Sotomayor	February 14, 2023	November 7, 2023	
Milestone 30th Anniversary Special	#1	Nikolas Draper-Ivey; Evan Narcisse; Geoffrey Thorne; Stephanie Williams	Juan Castro; ChrisCross; Nikolas Draper-Ivey; Anthony Fowler Jr. Sean Damien Hill; Atagun Ilhan; Yasmin Flores Montanez; Norm Rapmund; Dexter Vines	Nikolas Draper-Ivey; Romulo Fajardo Jr. Noelle Giddings; Wil Quintana; Chris Sotomayor	March 21, 2023		
New Talent Showcase: The Milestone Initiative	#1	Ashley Allen; Julio Anta; Greg Burnham; Natham Cayanan; Jordan Clark; Cheryl Lynn Eaton; Morgan Hampton; Jarred A. Lujan; Jarod Rhys Pratt; Jerome Rhett; Dorado Quick; Zipporah Smith	Tiahn Ankum; Anthony Fowler Jr.; Wade von Grawbadger; Scott Hanna; Daimon Hampton; Atagun Ilhan; John Livesay; Gregory Maldonado; Jose Marzan Jr.; Yasmin Flores Montanez; Petterson Oliveria; Roberto Poggi; Andrea Rosales; Lucas Silveira; Marcus Smith; Charles Stewart III; Le Beau Underwood; Dexter Vines; Kameron White; Walden Wong	Michael Atiyeh; Andrew Dalhouse; Nick Filardi; Luis Guerrero; Alex Guimarães; Hi-Fi; Chris Sotomayor; Bryan Valenza	June 6, 2023		
Static Team-Up: Anansi	#1	Evan Narcisse	Jose Marzan, Jr. Charles Stewart III	Luis Guerrero	June 13, 2023		
=== Year 4 ===
Milestone Universe: The Shadow Cabinet	#1–4	Joseph P. Illidge	Darryl Banks; Atagun Ilhan	TBA	November 20, 2024	February 2025	

== Collected editions ==
Title	Material collected	Pages	Publication date	ISBN
Static: Season One	Milestone Returns: Infinite Edition #0; Static: Season One #1–6	200	February 1, 2022	ISBN 1779514212, 978-1779514219
Icon and Rocket: Season One	Milestone Returns: Infinite Edition #0; Icon and Rocket: Season One #1–6	192	June 28, 2022	ISBN 1779515529, 978-1779515520
Hardware: Season One	Milestone Returns: Infinite Edition #0; Hardware: Season One #1–6	192	October 4, 2022	ISBN 1779515138, 978-1779515131
Blood Syndicate: Season One	Blood Syndicate: Season One #1–6	152	April 11, 2023	ISBN 1779518439, 978-1779518439
Duo	Duo #1–6	186	April 25, 2023	ISBN 1779518455, 978-1779518453
Static: Shadows of Dakota	Static: Shadows of Dakota #1–7; Static Team-Up: Anansi	200	February 6, 2024	ISBN 1779518552, 978-1779518552
Icon vs. Hardware	Icon vs. Hardware #1–5	192	February 6, 2024	ISBN 177952305X, 978-1779523051
Milestone Universe: The Shadow Cabinet	Milestone Universe: The Shadow Cabinet #1-5; Milestone 30th Anniversary Special #1	208	August 19, 2025	ISBN 978-1799505372
