= List of Static Shock episodes =

This article consists of a list of episodes of the animated series Static Shock.

== Series overview ==
Season	Episodes	Originally released		
Season	Episodes	First released	Last released	Network
1	13	September 23, 2000	May 12, 2001	Kids' WB
2	11	January 26, 2002	May 4, 2002	Kids' WB
3	15	January 25, 2003	June 21, 2003	Kids' WB
4	13	January 17, 2004	May 22, 2004	Kids' WB

== Episodes ==
=== Season 1 (2000–01) ===
No. overall	No. in season	Title	Directed by	Written by	Storyboarded by	Original release date	Prod. code
1	1	"Shock to the System"	James Tucker	Christopher Simmons	Scott Jeralds, Brandon McKinney, Pat McEown, James Tucker and Marcus Williams	September 23, 2000	385–551
Virgil Hawkins is a smart, funny teen who tangles with school gang leader Francis Stone, also known as "F-Stop." The leader of another school gang, Wade, protects Virgil sometimes, but says he can't be there all the time for him. Wade asks Virgil to join his gang, but Virgil does not want to be a part of it because a gang's gunfire killed his mother, Jean. Wade tells Virgil to show up at the docks. Virgil is afraid to decline, so he shows up. When Virgil arrives at the docks, Wade's gang gives him a gun as F-Stop's gang shows up. A gang fight ensues. Virgil throws the gun in the river and hides as the police arrive. As soon as the police get there, they start shooting, hitting some gas canisters and causing gas to spread all over the docks. Virgil runs home and, the next day, discovers he can control and manipulate electricity and anything metallic. He goes over to his best friend Richie's house, and they pick out a costume and a superhero name for Virgil, resulting in the introduction of a new hero by the name of Static.
2	2	"Aftershock"	Dan Riba	Story by : Stan Berkowitz and Alan Burnett; Teleplay by : Stan Berkowitz	Bret Blevins, Dave Chlystek and Keith Giffen	September 30, 2000	385–552
As a result of previous episode's explosion, metahumans (a.k.a. Bang Babies) are everywhere and most of them are committing crimes. Virgil begins to fight crime as Static, and when F-Stop returns, now possessing the metahuman ability to control fire and renaming himself "Hotstreak", Virgil is ready to beat him once and for all, but loses his first fight. Virgil also learns that Alva and the Mayor were responsible for the gas that caused the metahuman mutations, and tries to prove it by sneaking into Alva's office to find proof - but winds up fighting off an army of Alva's henchmen. Virgil ultimately defeats the henchmen and takes a disk that contains proof. Later, as Static fights Hotstreak again, the disk with all of Alva's information on it gets destroyed. However, Static powers up and finally defeats Hotstreak.
3	3	"The Breed"	Denys Cowan	Christopher Simmons	Rick Hoberg, Rafael Rosado and Mike Swanigan	October 7, 2000	385–553
Derek Barnett, a popular school athlete, asks Virgil for help for tutoring. He begins to head home after, and it is revealed that he is a Bang Baby, turning into a mass of ionic energy. Terrified and unable to control his abilities, he is recruited into the Meta-Breed, a group of evil Bang Babies. They consist of leader Ebon, who can manipulate shadows; Talon, who is part bird; and Shiv, who can change his hands into weapons.
4	4	"Grounded"	James Tucker	Len Uhley	Pat McEown, Brandon McKinney and Marcus Williams	October 14, 2000	385–554
While analyzing a part of an amoeba mutated by the Big Bang, Virgil and Richie become locked in school late at night with the protesting journalism class, led by Frieda.
5	5	"They're Playing My Song"	Dan Riba	Dwayne McDuffie	Bret Blevins, Dave Chlystek and Keith Giffen	November 11, 2000	385–555
A metahuman named Adam Evans, aka Rubberband Man, attempts to get revenge on Ice Pack, a rapper who stole a song he wrote.
6	6	"The New Kid"	Denys Cowan	Story by : Stan Berkowitz and Alan Burnett; Teleplay by : Rodney Vaccaro	Rick Hoberg, Rafael Rosado and Mike Swanigan	November 18, 2000	385–556
Virgil gets accepted into the Vanmoor Institute only to discover that students Specs and Trapper work for Edwin Alva and are manipulating him into helping build a robot to capture Static. After defeating them, Virgil gets a new friend and ally in his fellow student Daisy Watkins.
7	7	"Child's Play"	James Tucker	Stan Berkowitz	Pat McEown, Brandon McKinney and Marcus Williams	December 2, 2000	385–557
A young boy, Dwayne, discovers that he was affected by the Big Bang, and is able to manifest his thoughts into reality. His stepbrother, Aaron, exploits these abilities for his own benefit.
8	8	"Sons of the Fathers"	Dan Riba	Christopher Simmons	Bret Blevins, Dave Chlystek, Keith Giffen and Matthew Youngberg	December 9, 2000	385–558
Richie invites Virgil to spend the night at his house. Unfortunately, his father Sean arrives home early, and is racist towards Virgil and his family. Richie runs away out of anger and shame, and is captured by Ebon. It takes the combined efforts of Static, Mr. Foley, and Mr. Hawkins to save Richie. Mr. Foley apologizes and resolves to change his ways.
9	9	"Winds of Change"	James Tucker	Len Uhley	Pat McEown, Brandon McKinney and Marcus Williams	December 16, 2000	385–560
Richie's tendency to live vicariously through Static starts to get on Virgil's nerves. Virgil starts trying to him by spending more time with Daisy. This causes Richie to get slightly jealous. Meanwhile, a heavyset Dakota bully begins exhibiting wind-based powers. He creates a costume and becomes a villain known as Slipstream. When Static and Slipstream are fighting at a waterpark, Richie tries to help bring down Slipstream, but ends up causing a waterslide to collapse onto Static. After this, Virgil and Richie get into a fight and part ways. However, after realizing the pointlessness of their arguing, they get back together and take down Slipstream.
10	10	"Bent Out of Shape"	Dan Riba	Dwayne McDuffie	Bret Blevins, Dave Chlystek and Keith Giffen	January 27, 2001	385–561
Rubberband Man escapes from jail and becomes "Stringer", a rapper who is dating Virgil's older sister, Sharon. Once Static realizes Stringer is Rubberband Man, the latter runs away and blames Static for ruining his new life. He attacks Static and unmasks him, but before he can look, Puff and Onyx, meta-humans who decided to become bounty hunters for cash incentives, intervene.
11	11	"Junior"	Denys Cowan	Story by : Alan Burnett and Dwayne McDuffie; Teleplay by : Dwayne McDuffie	Rick Hoberg, Rafael Rosado and Mike Swanigan	February 10, 2001	385–559
Edwin Alva Jr., does whatever he can to earn his father's respect, even going so far as to discover a method to control the effects of the Big Bang fluid. However, Alva completely dismisses his son, causing him to become angry and harness the gas's power to become the villain Omnifarious, targeting everything his father holds dear with extremely dangerous and catastrophic results. Static attacks Omnifarious, who recognizes him as Alva's son, while he discovers Static's secret identity using his X-ray vision and threatens to reveal it. When he sees Static working with his father against him, Omnifarious becomes angry and overdoses on the gas, turning to stone.
12	12	"Replay"	Denys Cowan	Story by : Brooks Wachtel; Teleplay by : Len Uhley	Bret Blevins, Rick Hoberg and Mike Swanigan	March 3, 2001	385–562
While battling Replay, a meta-human capable of duplicating himself, a freak accident permits him to make a copy of Static. The doppelgänger ruins Static's name. The entire city mistakes the doppelganger for Static and declares him to be public enemy number one, while the real Static fights to restore his own name.
13	13	"Tantrum"	James Tucker	Christopher Simmons	Pat McEown, Brandon McKinney and Marcus Williams	May 12, 2001	385–563
A purple monstrosity goes on several rampages through the city while Virgil struggles with the memorial service of his late mother while still recovering from her death.

=== Season 2 (2002) ===
No. overall	No. in season	Title	Directed by	Written by	Storyboarded by	Original release date	Prod. code
14	1	"The Big Leagues"	Dave Chlystek	Len Uhley	David J. Chlystek, Scott Jeralds, Eddie Lin, Pat McEown and Marcus Williams	January 26, 2002	385–611
Static teams up with Batman and Robin after Joker comes to Dakota to recruit Bang Babies. Note: As of this episode, Static Shock is officially integrated into the DC Animated Universe. Prior to this episode, the series did not feature any other DC Comics characters and was largely standalone.
15	2	"Power Play"	Joe Sichta	Dwayne McDuffie	James Fuji, Brandon McKinney, Joe Sichta and Kuni Tomita	February 2, 2002	385–609
Richie bumps into an old man in an alleyway, who gives him the ability of energy manipulation. He uses his powers to become a superhero named "Push", but panics when they begin to fade. The old man then reappears and introduces himself as Ragtag, a Bang Baby with the ability to grant others superpowers. Richie is desperate to keep being a hero, and eventually joins forces with Run and Jump - teens who Ragtag gave the gifts of super-speed and teleportation, respectively - to commit crimes on the old man's behalf in exchange for more "hits" of power.
16	3	"Brother-Sister Act"	Joe Sichta	Len Uhley	Ryan Anthony, Tim Maltby, Joe Sichta and Kuni Tomita	February 9, 2002	385–603
When Robert Hawkins leaves town and puts Sharon in charge of the house, Virgil is less than happy, and becomes especially worried when Sharon begins to deduce his secret identity. To make matters worse, two new Bang Babies have begun a crime spree: Boom, a teenager with a loudspeaker in his chest that allows him to shoot concussive sound-wave blasts, and his younger sister Mirage, who has the ability to manipulate light to create illusions. Upon discovering that Mirage is a reluctant partner in her older brother's plots, Static tries to work with her to stop Boom while simultaneously keeping Sharon from discovering his secret.
17	4	"Static Shaq"	Denys Cowan	Christopher Simmons	Ryan Anthony, Denys Cowan, Keith Giffen, Rick Hoberg, Scott Jeralds, Samuel Montes, Sebastian Montes, Raphael Rosado, Clint Taylor and Kirk Van Wormer	February 16, 2002	385–604
Static is hunted by the Ruff Pack, who nearly discover his secret identity. Meanwhile, Shaquille O'Neal (voiced by himself), an old friend of Robert Hawkins, comes to Dakota and helps Static fight the villains.
18	5	"Frozen Out"	Dave Chlystek	Len Uhley	David J. Chlystek, Jen Graves, Pat McEown, Eddie Lin and Marcus Williams	February 23, 2002	385–605
The holiday season is upon Dakota, and Virgil is trying to balance attending various parties for his friends of different faiths. Complications arise when a Bang Baby named Permafrost, who has powerful cryokinetic abilities, causes trouble around. It is eventually revealed that she is a homeless girl named Maureen Conner, who suffers from mental problems stemming from her mother's death and stepfather's neglect and is unable to control her powers. Static eventually finds Maureen and, rather than fighting her, offers her aid. Maureen calms down and accepts help from a local pastor, which in turn teaches Virgil the true meaning of the holidays.
19	6	"Sunspots"	Denys Cowan	Stan Berkowitz	Denys Cowan, Rick Hoberg, Scott Jeralds and Brandon McKinney	March 2, 2002	385–601
A series of sunspots cause Static to lose control of his powers, which become a problem when Hotstreak goes on a rampage.
20	7	"Pop's Girlfriend"	Denys Cowan	Christopher Simmons	Denys Cowan, Keith Giffen, Rick Hoberg, Samuel Montes, Sebastian Montes and Kirk Van Wormer	March 9, 2002	385–607
Static comes into conflict with police officer Trina Jessup, who suspects him of having stolen vials of quantum vapor. Trina is also dating Robert Hawkins, and when he grounds Virgil after learning about the incident. As such, Virgil must break out of confinement to fight Royce and Frankie, two teenage delinquents who were responsible for the theft, as well as several insects whom they unintentionally mutated.
21	8	"Bad Stretch"	Joe Sichta	Dwayne McDuffie	Tim Maltby, Brandon McKinney, Joe Sichta and Kuni Tomita	March 23, 2002	385–606
Rubberband Man returns as a hero. Everybody doubts him due to his criminal past, but he proves himself to have really been redeemed when Ebon (his older brother) comes to invite him into the Metabreed and frames him for his own crimes.
22	9	"Attack of the Living Brain Puppets"	Dave Chlystek	Len Uhley	David J. Chlystek, Eddie Lin, Pat McEown and Marcus Williams	April 6, 2002	385–608
In an effort to win the class president election, a high-school Bang Baby named Madelyn Spaulding uses her mind control powers to convert almost everyone in Dakota into a zombie-like state.
23	10	"Duped"	Denys Cowan	Len Uhley and Christopher Simmons	Denys Cowan, Keith Giffen, Rick Hoberg, Samuel Montes, Sebastian Montes and Kirk Van Wormer	April 27, 2002	385–613
Adam enlists the help of AJ McLean from the Backstreet Boys to get a recording deal. However, a jealous competitor, Replikon (voiced by Coolio), wants to reap the fame and winnings for himself, and uses his shapeshifting abilities to disguise himself as McLean.
24	11	"Jimmy"	Joe Sichta	Story by : Alan Burnett and Dwayne McDuffie; Teleplay by : Dwayne McDuffie	James Fuji, Brandon McKinney, Joe Sichta and Kuni Tomita	May 4, 2002	385–612
After being mercilessly tormented and pranked by a group of bullies, a troubled teen named Jimmy Osgood uses his father's gun in an attempt to take revenge, only to accidentally shoot Richie in the leg. With the help of a psychologist, Virgil must deal with the shock and guilt for not preventing the incident.

=== Season 3 (2003) ===
No. overall	No. in season	Title	Directed by	Written by	Storyboard by	Original release date	Prod. code	K9–14 viewers (in millions)
25	1	"Hard as Nails"	Rich Collado (animation timing), Fred Miller (animation timing), Swinton O. Scott III (animation timing)	Paul Dini	Chuck Drost, Keith Giffen, Rick Hoberg, Brandon McKinney and Kirk Van Wormer	January 25, 2003	385–851	N/A
Lured by Poison Ivy and Harley Quinn, a young Bang Baby, Allie Langford / Nails, travels to Gotham City in hopes of finding a cure for her powers. Static and Batman once again team up to resolve the case and help Nails at the same time.
26	2	"Gear"	Rich Collado (animation timing), Fred Miller (animation timing), Karen Peterson (animation timing), Swinton O. Scott III (animation timing)	Story by : Alan Burnett; Teleplay by : Dwayne McDuffie	Patrick Archibald, Mark Howard, Frank Paur, Alex Soto and Clint Taylor	February 1, 2003	385–853	N/A
In a delayed effect of the Big Bang, Richie manifests the ability of superhuman intelligence from prolonged exposure to the quantum vapor. He is disappointed because his abilities are hardly as flashy as Static's, but when the Meta-Breed decide to kidnap Virgil, Richie is forced to become the superhero Gear to rescue him.
27	3	"Static in Africa"	Jeff Hall (animation timing), Herb Moore (animation timing), Swinton O. Scott III (animation timing)	Dwayne McDuffie	Vic Dal Chele, Dan Fausett, Romeo Francisco, Larry Houston and Kuni Tomita	February 8, 2003	385–852	N/A
When the Hawkins family goes on a vacation to Ghana, Static teams up with the legendary African hero Anansi to stop a group of bandits led by the leopard Osebo from stealing an ancient African treasure.
28	4	"She-Bang"	Rich Collado (animation timing), Fred Miller (animation timing), Karen Peterson (animation timing), Swinton O. Scott III (animation timing)	Story by : Alan Burnett; Teleplay by : Len Uhley	Vic Dal Chele, Dan Fausett, Romeo Francisco, Larry Houston and Kuni Tomita	February 15, 2003	385–855	N/A
Static encounters a sassy, female teenage superhero named She-Bang, who is also classmates with him in her civilian identity. Static and Gear learn that she is a genetically engineered superhuman, and the company that created her now wants her back.
29	5	"The Usual Suspect"	Jeff Hall (animation timing), Herb Moore (animation timing), Karen Peterson (animation timing), Swinton O. Scott III (animation timing)	Len Uhley	Chuck Drost, Keith Giffen, Rick Hoberg, Brandon McKinney and Kirk Van Wormer	February 22, 2003	385–854	N/A
Static and Gear fight a destructive monstrous meta-human who is taking revenge on individuals who angered a well-known bully, Marcus Reed, at school.
30	6	"A League of Their Own, Part 1"	Jerilyn Dever (animation timing), Karen Peterson (animation timing), Herb Moore (animation timing), Brian Hogan (animation timing), Jeff Hall (animation timing), Brian Sheasley (animation timing)	Story by : John Semper Jr. and Ernie Altbacker; Teleplay by : Ernie Altbacker	Vic Dal Chele, Dan Fausett, Romeo Francisco, Kuni Tomita, James Yang and Larry Houston	March 1, 2003	385–858	1.15
A cosmic storm strikes the Watchtower of the Justice League, draining it of its power and sending it hurtling towards Earth. Static is brought in to recharge it, but unbeknownst to all, the power outage enabled a piece of Brainiac to escape the League's containment and infiltrate the station's computer system. After the Justice League is called away, Static and Gear discover Brainiac lurking inside the computers and soon face the fight of their lives.
31	7	"A League of Their Own, Part 2"	Jerilyn Dever (animation timing), Jeff Hall (animation timing), Brian Hogan (animation timing), Karen Peterson (animation timing), Brian Sheasley (animation timing)	Dwayne McDuffie	Chuck Drost, Rick Hoberg, Brad Rader, Alan Wan, Brandon McKinney and Kirk Van Wormer	March 8, 2003	385–860	1.35 (Note: This episode also received 0.93 million viewers with teens aged 12-17.)
Static and the Justice League think Brainiac has been defeated, but in fact he has survived and taken control over Richie and the League. Now Static has to devise a plan to free his best friend without harming him.
32	8	"Showtime"	Rich Collado (animation timing), Jerilyn Dever (animation timing), Fred Miller (animation timing), Karen Peterson (animation timing), Swinton O. Scott III (animation timing)	Story by : Alan Burnett; Teleplay by : Courtney Lilly	Chuck Drost, Rick Hoberg, Brandon McKinney, Jay Oliva, Brad Rader and Kirk Van Wormer	March 22, 2003	385–857	N/A
When sleazy TV producer Bernie Rast wants to make a series about Static, it drives a wedge between Static, who acts as a show off for the camera, and Gear, who is jealous of the attention Static is getting. When a new meta-human with much stronger and more powerful electromagnetic abilities shows up, Static is seen on live TV multiple times. Static and Gear have to put aside their arguing to come up with a solution to stop him.
33	9	"Consequences"	Denys Cowan, Tom McLaughlin (animation timing)	Christopher Simmons	Denys Cowan, Keith Giffen, Rick Hoberg, Samuel Montes, Sebastian Montes and Kirk Van Wormer	April 5, 2003	385–610	1.27 (Note: This episode also received 0.87 million viewers with teens aged 12-17.)
Daisy gets hurt in a fight between Puff, Onyx, and Static, and falls into a coma. Static blames himself because he tried to show off instead of focusing on her safety. He tries to hunt down the two villains, destroying everything in his path. Rubberband Man succeeds in cooling him down. Puff and Onyx soon learn that Static has gone on a destructive rampage to hunt them down. They decide to use this as an advantage to ruin his reputation, and do that by going on a rampage of their own to drive Static's anger to the top. Note: This episode was intended to be broadcast as part of the second season, but was later aired in the third season. As a result, the animators failed to amend the design of characters to reflect their new appearances, creating continuity errors.
34	10	"Romeo in the Mix"	Jerilyn Dever (animation timing), Jeff Hall (animation timing), Karen Peterson (animation timing), Bob Tyler (animation timing)	Story by : Rhonda Smiley; Teleplay by : Len Uhley	Mark Howard, Clint Taylor, Frank Paur, Barry Caldwell, Alex Soto and Brian Hogan	April 19, 2003	385–862	1.09 (Note: This episode also received 0.77 million viewers with teens aged 12-17.)
Bernie Rast convinces Lil Romeo (voiced by himself) to make a music video in Dakota, promising his favorite superhero, Static, will be there. But when Lil Romeo dresses in a Static costume for the video, he is mistakenly captured by Leech, a power-absorbing meta-human who has been kidnapping Bang-Babies to temporarily absorb their abilities. Static, Lil Romeo and Gear have to rescue the other Bang-Babies and put the Leech behind bars for good.
35	11	"Trouble Squared"	Dave Chlystek, Cullen Blaine (animation timing), Tom McLaughlin (animation timing)	Christopher Simmons	David J. Chlystek, Keith Giffen, Eddie Lin and Marcus Williams	April 26, 2003	385–602	N/A
Alva hires Specs and Trapper to do grunt work on the research project to cure his son; unsatisfied with this, they develop combat-powered exoskeleton suits to catch Static. They nearly succeed, but in the battle, a lot of the research equipment is destroyed. Specs and Trapper get fired, and kidnap Alva Jr. to blackmail their former boss, who now needs the help of Static to get his son back. Note: This episode was intended to be broadcast as part of the second season, but was later aired in the third season. As a result, the animators failed to amend the design of characters to reflect their new appearances, creating continuity errors.
36	12	"Toys in the Hood"	Jerilyn Dever (animation timing), Brian Hogan (animation timing), Brian Sheesley (animation timing), Rich Collado (animation timing), Karen Peterson (animation timing), Fred Miller (animation timing)	Story by : John Semper Jr. and Ernie Altbacker; Teleplay by : John Ridley	Chuck "Kirk" Drost, Brandon McKinney, Rick Hoberg, Kuni Tomita, Patrick Archibald and Kirk "Chuck" Van Wormer	May 3, 2003	385–863	1.53 (Note: This episode also received 0.81 million viewers with teens aged 12-17.)
Static teams up with Superman when his old nemesis Toyman appears in Dakota to find and locate his doll Darci after she escaped from him. It soon becomes clear that Darci intends to take over Daisy's life by assuming a new body based on her, and Static and Superman must work together to rescue her.
37	13	"The Parent Trap"	Jerilyn Dever (animation timing), Jeff Hall (animation timing), Fred Miller (animation timing), Rich Collado (animation timing), Karen Peterson (animation timing), Robert Tyler (animation timing)	Len Uhley	Vic Dal Chele, Dan Fausett, Larry Houston, Kuni Tomita and Romeo Francisco	May 24, 2003	385–861	N/A
She-Bang returns to Dakota and learns Static and Gear's secret identities after following them to the Gas Station of Solitude. She enlists their help in locating her parents, Jonathan and Dolores Vale, who have mysteriously gone missing in the wake of a large villain capable of absorbing mass and matter appearing in Dakota.
38	14	"Flashback"	Jeff Hall (animation timing), Herb Moore (animation timing), Karen Peterson (animation timing), Swinton O. Scott III (animation timing), Brian Sheesley (animation timing)	John Semper Jr.	Patrick Archibald, Mark Howard, Roy Smith, Alex "Suave" Soto and Clint Taylor	June 7, 2003	385–856	0.69 (12-17) (Note: with teens aged 12 through 17)
Five years ago, Dakota was hit by gang riots following a mass blackout, during which Static's mother, paramedic Jean Hawkins, was killed by a stray bullet. In the present, as Virgil struggles with his lack of memories of Jean, a new meta-human, Nina Crocker, seeks out Static and Gear's help as Ebon is pursuing her for her time-manipulating abilities. Gear invents a device that enables her to control her powers, but Ebon steals it. As Static attempts to recover it, he accidentally sends himself, Gear, Nina, and Ebon back in time to the riots, where he meets Jean as Ebon attempts to recreate the Big Bang on a larger scale.
39	15	"Blast From the Past"	Jerilyn Dever (animation timing), Bob Tyler (animation timing), Fred Miller (animation timing), Rich Collado (animation timing), Karen Peterson (animation timing)	Story by : Adam Beechen; Teleplay by : John Semper Jr. and Adam Beechen	Mark Howard, Clint Taylor, Marcus Williams, Tim Maltby, Frank Paur, Alex Soto and Chris Rutkowski	June 21, 2003	385–859	1.02 (Note: This episode also received 0.74 million viewers with teens aged 12-17.)
Static reluctantly teams up with a retired electricity-manipulating/controlling superhero from the sixties, Soul Power, to defeat his old enemy Professor Menace. Static does not see eye-to-eye with Soul Power's methods or outdated campy style, but they eventually become allies and Static helps him take down Professor Menace. Soul Power officially retires and leaves the superhero job of protecting Dakota to Static.

=== Season 4 (2004) ===
No. overall	No. in season	Title	Directed by	Written by	Storyboarded by	Original release date	Prod. code	K9–14 viewers (in millions)
40	1	"Future Shock"	Victor Dal Chele	Stan Berkowitz	Vic Dal Cele, Larry Houston Productions and Brandon McKinney	January 17, 2004	257–371	N/A
Static, after assisting Batman and Robin with a mission, is accidentally sent 40 years into the future, where he has to help the Batman of that era, Terry McGinnis, save Static's future self from Kobra.
41	2	"She-Back!"	Mark Howard	Len Uhley	Patrick Archibald, Vinton Heuck and Clint Taylor	January 24, 2004	257–372	1.04
When She-Bang returns to Dakota, her loud and expressive personality clashes with Static and Gear's established dynamic. Meanwhile, Madelyn Spaulding experiences a change in her meta-human condition, replacing her former mind-control abilities with new telekinetic ones. She breaks several other meta-humans out of jail in an attempt to get revenge on Static.
42	3	"Out of Africa"	Victor Dal Chele	Dwayne McDuffie	Dan Fausett, Larry Houston Productions and Rick Hoberg	January 31, 2004	257–373	N/A
Anansi visits Dakota in an attempt to stop Osebo and his new allies, Onini and Mmboro, from obtaining a golden spider which is the source of his powers. Static and Gear get caught up in the mix as they have to save Sharon, whom Dr. Anokye entrusted with the spider for protection and whom Osebo subsequently kidnaps.
43	4	"Fallen Hero"	Chuck Drost	Story by : John Semper Jr. Teleplay by : Stan Berkowitz	Jennifer Graves, Brandon McKinney and James K. Yang	February 7, 2004	257–374	N/A
Static faces off against his idol, Green Lantern, when he seemingly begins to commit robberies all over Dakota. However, he discovers that Sinestro is responsible, having stolen power from Green Lantern.
44	5	"Army of Darkness"	Mark Howard	John Semper Jr.	Patrick Archibald, Frank Paur and Clint Taylor	February 14, 2004	257–375	N/A
Static and Gear must do battle with the Nightbreed, a group of Bang Babies who have a lethal reaction to sunlight. Under Ebon's leadership, they intend to blanket Dakota City in darkness.
45	6	"No Man's an Island"	Mark Howard	Ralph Soll	Patrick Archibald, Jay Oliva and Frank Paur	February 21, 2004	257–378	N/A
In an attempt to revive his son, Edwin Alva kidnaps Static, Hot-Streak, Talon, Gear, and Rubberband Man. Static and Hot-Streak, handcuffed together, must cooperate to escape and rescue their fellow captives.
46	7	"Hoop Squad"	Victor Dal Chele	Len Uhley and David Garber	Dan Fausett, Rick Hoberg, Larry Houston Productions and Kuni Tomita	February 28, 2004	257–376	N/A
Static meets a team of basketball players (guest stars NBA players Steve Nash, Yao Ming, Karl Malone, and Tracy McGrady) who moonlight as superheroes. The Hoop Squad teams up with Static to rescue Gear, who has been kidnapped by evil scientist Dr. Odium.
47	8	"Now You See Him..."	Chuck Drost	Dwayne McDuffie	Jennifer Graves, Brandon McKinney and James K. Yang	March 13, 2004	257–377	N/A
A teenager, Eddie Felson, steals a time-manipulating device that grants him super-speed, which he uses in an attempt to win Daisy's romantic affection. He learns Static and Gear's identities and blackmails them into leaving him alone so that he can win Daisy over.
48	9	"Where the Rubber Meets the Road"	Chuck Drost	Matt S. Wayne	Jennifer Graves, Brandon McKinney and James K. Yang	March 27, 2004	257–380	N/A
Rubberband Man must overcome his dyslexia to disarm a powerful fusion reactor that Specs and Trapper stole from Alva Industries.
49	10	"Linked"	Victor Dal Chele	Story by : John Semper Jr. and Robert Goodman; Teleplay by : Robert Goodman	Dan Fausett, Rick Hoberg and Larry Houston Productions	May 1, 2004	257–379	N/A
Successful football player, Dulé Jones, keeps his Bang Baby status largely secret. The only one who knows is his former fellow gang member Troy, who attempts to expose him out of jealousy as Static and Gear get caught up in the middle of it.
50	11	"Wet and Wild"	Mark Howard	Len Uhley	Patrick Archibald, Jay Oliva and Frank Paur	May 8, 2004	257–381	N/A
After being captured by Static and Gear, Aquamaria agrees to be given the experimental cure for the mutagenic gas that transformed her into a Bang Baby. However, Hot-Streak sabotages the process, causing her to become unstable and unable to solidify her form. In an angry rage, she threatens all of Dakota.
51	12	"Kidnapped"	Victor Dal Chele	John Semper Jr.	Dan Fausett, Rick Hoberg and Larry Houston Productions	May 15, 2004	257–382	N/A
Alva fires employee Karen Roberts, who was charged with the task of discovering Static's identity, since he no longer wants to know it with his son now revived. However, Roberts goes against orders and uncovers Static's identity herself, kidnapping his father and blackmailing him into stealing parts from Alva Industries as part of her plan to take control of all technology on Earth.
52	13	"Power Outage"	Chuck Drost	Story by : Alan Burnett and John Semper Jr. Teleplay by : John Semper Jr.	Chuck Drost, Jennifer Graves, Brandon McKinney, Kirk Van Wormer and James K. Yang	May 22, 2004	257–383	N/A
All the Bang Babies in Dakota, including Static and Gear, find themselves reverting to normal, having unknowingly been exposed to the cure for the mutagenic gas. However, many of the Bang Babies, including Ebon and Hot-Streak, seek to reverse this and break into the labs that created the gas. Static and Gear find themselves forced to prevent a new disaster, especially when Ebon and Hot-Streak inadvertently create a new problem.

== Crossovers ==
No.	Title	Directed by	Written by	Original release date
12	"The Once and Future Thing Part 1: Weird Western Tales"	Dan Riba	Dwayne McDuffie	January 22, 2005
Batman, Wonder Woman, and Green Lantern chase Chronos into the past, where they team up with some of the greatest DC heroes of the Old West. After defeating stolen future tech in that era, they again follow Chronos to the future. Warhawk, a member of the future Justice League, is revealed to be the son of Green Lantern and Hawkgirl.
13	"The Once and Future Thing Part 2: Time Warped"	Joaquim Dos Santos	Dwayne McDuffie	January 29, 2005
Batman, Green Lantern, and Wonder Woman chase Chronos into the Neo-Gotham City, just in time to face a battle with a group of Jokerz beside that era's Justice League. The time travelers are taken to the Justice League Unlimited refuge. An older Bruce Wayne reveals the street gang they fought together was enhanced by Chronos, who led them to kill the rest of the League of that era. The combined heroes defeat the retooled Jokerz, and Batman traps Chronos in a time loop of him arguing with his wife right before he began time traveling.
