= Static (DC Comics) =

DC Comics character

- Static as depicted in Static: Season One #6 (March 2022). Art by Nikolas Draper-Ivey.

Publication information
- Publisher: DC Comics
- First appearance: Icon #1 May 1993 (preview); Static #1 June 1993 (full appearance)
- Created by: Dwayne McDuffie; Denys Cowan; Christopher Priest; Michael Davis; Derek T. Dingle

In-story information
- Alter ego: Virgil Ovid Hawkins
- Species: Metahuman
- Team affiliations: Justice League; S.T.A.R. Labs; Teen Titans; Young Justice; Heroes; Shadow Cabinet
- Partnerships: Kid Flash; Aquagirl (Lorena Marquez); Wonder Girl; Robin; Blue Beetle; Miss Martian
- Notable aliases: Static
- Abilities: List: Electromagnetic phenomena generation and manipulation (colored light violet); Electromagnetic manipulation; Electromagnetic energy field manipulation; Generation of electrostatic force-fields; Electrokinesis; Electrogenesis; Electroreception; Electrocommunication; Energy absorption and redirection/transmutation; Flight via electrostatic disc plate; Keen scientific mind; Expert strategist; Technopathy/Technokinesis/Mechanokinesis (via manipulation of electrical signals); Regenerative healing; Electricity/Lightning empowerment; Electricity absorption; Electricity manipulation; Electrical energy manipulation; Electric charge manipulation; Electricity element control; Lightning manipulation; Lightning element control; Magnetic empowerment; Electronic disruption; Psionic immunity; Manipulation of subatomic particles; Data manipulation

Static (Virgil Ovid Hawkins) is a superhero appearing in American comic books published by DC Comics. The character was created by Milestone Comics founders Dwayne McDuffie, Denys Cowan, Michael Davis, Derek T. Dingle, and Christopher Priest. The character first appeared in a 3-page preview in Icon #1 (May 1993) with his first full appearance in Static #1 (June 1993), written by McDuffie and Robert L. Washington III and illustrated by John Paul Leon. He is a member of a fictional subspecies of humans with superhuman abilities known as metahumans. Not born with his powers, Hawkins' abilities develop after an incident exposes him to a radioactive chemical called "Quantum Juice", turning him into a "Bang Baby" (a sub-category of metahuman).

The character drew much inspiration and was in fact designed to represent a modern-era Spider-Man archetype. After the closing of Milestone Comics, Static was incorporated into the DC Universe and became a member of the Teen Titans.

Static has made numerous appearances in other forms of media. The character has been featured in various animated series, including Static Shock, a version of the storyline made slightly more suitable for a younger audience, as well as animated films and video games.

== Publication history ==
Static on the cover of Static #1 (May 1993), his solo series debut. Art by Denys Cowan and Jimmy Palmiotti.

An African-American teenager, Static was a key character of Milestone Comics, an independently owned imprint of DC Comics founded by Dwayne McDuffie, Denys Cowan, Michael Davis, Derek T. Dingle, and Christopher Priest with a greater representation of minority heroes. Originally developed for Marvel Comics, Static would become a main staple of the Milestone line. When initially creating the first five characters for Milestone Comics, it was decided that Static should be a teenage hero, similar to Marvel's Spider-Man. Static's civilian identity, Virgil Hawkins, was named after Virgil D. Hawkins, a black man who was denied entrance to the University of Florida's law school due to his race in 1949. The character's superhero identity was suggested by Priest (who co-developed the original Milestone bible with McDuffie), inspired by the song "Static" by James Brown.

The character was introduced in one of the first four titles of comic books published by Milestone in 1993. His early adventures were written by Dwayne McDuffie and Robert L. Washington III, and penciled by John Paul Leon. Virgil Hawkins was fifteen years old when he became Static. In the comics, Virgil's family consists of his father, Robert, who works at Paris Island Hospital; his mother, Jean; and his sister, Sharon. Virgil attends Ernest Hemingway High School in the city of Dakota with his friends: Frieda Goren, Richard "Rick" Stone, Larry Wade, Chuck, Felix, and Daisy Watkins. In the guise of Static, Virgil eventually rescues Rick from danger. Not unlike Spider-Man, the character has a propensity for witty banter and humor, especially when engaged with opponents. In addition, Virgil utilizes his knowledge of science and pop culture in various battles and scenarios as Static.

McDuffie described the character:

"Like any other awkward 15-year-old, Virgil Hawkins worries about pocket money, getting beaten up, and drugs. But recently, he's had even more on his mind: stuff like his powers, his secret identity, and drugs. Because, when innocents are in danger, and Virgil can slip away from class, the geeky youth becomes Static, the dashing, adventurous superhero!"

During the 2019 DC FanDome, Static voice actor Phil LaMarr stated:

"Virgil is what I always wanted as a comic book kid growing up: Black Spider-Man. A good (comic-book) story can make you live it, feel it, and when it does, it resonates on a whole other level. It was so real world, and a textured story removed from the 1930s 'We are exhibiting the world'. I felt like it was drawn by somebody who lived in a building I could go into. It touched on archetypes as a comic fan that I loved, but also touched on my life as a Black man in the real world".

A self-professed geek, Virgil is portrayed as avid comic book and video game fan, something that was retained for his animated incarnation. In the comics, Virgil regularly visits the local comic store, in addition to creating fan comics with his friends, and participates in HeroClix-style and other tabletop role-playing games. In addition, he has been shown to be an avid video gamer at several points in both his series and the Teen Titans. In the 2001 miniseries Static Shock: Rebirth of the Cool, it is shown that at that point in time, Virgil is into collecting Pokémon cards and he likes Pikachu (the flagship Pokémon of the franchise, who also possesses electric abilities).

In an interview, former Teen Titans writer Geoff Johns expressed interest in having Static as part of the team: "I really wanted Static on the team, but there's so much red tape there that every time I requested it DC said 'not yet' and so I never got to have him" and later stating he had plans for the character since Teen Titans #1 (vol. 3). Any obstructions were eventually resolved and Static appeared in the Terror Titans, with his Milestone continuity folded in the mainstream New Earth continuity.

Static joined to the mainstream DC Universe where he would be added to the Teen Titans. Static made his first canonical DC Universe appearance in Terror Titans #4, battling Rose Wilson in the final round of the Dark Side Club Tournament.

Static was expected to receive his own series in 2011. The series was to be written by Felicia Henderson and drawn by Scott McDaniel, but was cancelled before the first issue could be released following the death of Static's creator, Dwayne McDuffie. However, a very limited one-shot titled Static Shock Special was released in June 2011, written by Henderson and drawn by Denys Cowan. Batwoman artist JH Williams III provided the one-shot's cover. A new series featuring Static titled Static Shock was launched in September 2011 as part of DC's relaunch after the Flashpoint event. The book is written by John Rozum and drawn by Scott McDaniel, who also co-wrote. As part of an effort to better integrate Static into the mainstream DCU, the title takes place in New York City rather than Dakota.

A new Static Shock digital comic series was released in February 2021.

=== Collected Editions ===
Title	Format	Material collected	Release date	ISBN
Static Shock Rebirth of the Cool	TPB	Static #1-4 and Static Shock!: Rebirth Of The Cool #1-4	2 June 2009	978-1779511775
Brave And The Bold Milestone	TPB	The Brave And The Bold #24-26, Hardware #16, Static #12, and Xombi #6	23 February 2010	978-1401226541
Static Shock Vol 01: Supercharged	TPB	Static Shock #1-8	3 July 2012	978-1401234843
Milestone Compendium One	TPB	Blood Syndicate #1-12, Hardware #1-12, Icon #1-10, Static #1-8; Xombi #0-11, and Shadow Cabinet #0	1 February 2022	978-1779513106
Static: Season One	Hardcover	Static Season One #1-6	7 June 2022	978-1779514219
Milestone Compendium Two	TPB	Blood Syndicate #13-23; Hardware #13-21; Icon #11-21; Static #9-20; Shadow Cabinet #1-4; Steel #6-7, Superboy #6-7, Superman: The Man of Steel #35-36 and Worlds Collide #1.	31 January 2023	978-1779514950
Static: Season One	TPB	Static Season One #1-6	30 May 2023	978-1779520128
Static Up All Night	DC Graphic Novels for Young Adults	Static Up All Night	7 November 2023	978-1779510518
Milestone Compendium Three	TPB	Deathwish #1-4, Blood Syndicate #24-27, Hardware #22-28, Icon #22-27, Static #21-25, Shadow Cabinet #5-13, and Kobalt #1-14	6 February 2024	978-1779526090
Static: Season One	DC Compact	Static Season One #1-6	27 May 2025	978-1799501541
Milestone Compendium Four	TPB	Blood Syndicate #28-32, Hardware #29-38, Icon #28-37, Static #26-31, Xombi #12-21, Shadow Cabinet #14-17, My Name is Holocaust #1-5, and The Long, Hot Summer #1-3	17 June 2025	978-1799500261
DC Finest: Static: Playing with Fire	DC Finest	Static #1-15, Superman: The Man of Steel #36, Superboy #7, and Worlds Collide #1	7 October 2025	978-1799502944
Milestone Compendium Five	TPB	Blood Syndicate #33-35, Hardware #39-50, Icon #38-42, Static #32-45, Wise Son: The White Wolf #1-4, Heroes #1-6, Static Shock!: Rebirth of the Cool #1-4, and Milestone Forever #1-2	16 June 2026	978-1799508328

== Fictional character biography ==
=== Dakota Verse ===
Virgil Hawkins as the teen superhero Static, as appeared in his original costume on a cover of his first eponymous series in 1994; art by M.D. Bright.

Doused with an experimental chemical during a gang war he was caught up in, high school student Virgil Ovid Hawkins gains a variety of electromagnetic powers and becomes a costumed crusader against crime. Like most teenaged heroes in the Spider-Man mold, he is often overwhelmed by the combined responsibilities of his career as a superhero and typical adolescent problems.

A resident of the city of Dakota, Virgil first gained his electromagnetic powers at a huge showdown between the gangs of the city, when he hoped to get revenge on a gang member who had been bullying him. The authorities arrive and release tear gas with what they believe to be a harmless radioactive marker so that any gang members would not escape arrest. The cops do not know the marker had been further spiked with an experimental mutagen called Quantum Juice (Q-Juice). This event ultimately came to be known as the "Big Bang". Those who were exposed came to be referred to as "bang babies" because the Big Bang was their metahuman birth.

When the agency behind the experiment tried to capture him, he fights back, discovering that he has gained the ability to generate, manipulate, and control electromagnetism. Virgil names himself "Static" and, armed with his wits and powers, became a superhero. For the most part, Virgil keeps his secret from his family, but his friend, Frieda Goren, learns his identity when he attempts to protect her from becoming a prize in a small skirmish between gangs.

Virgil is aided by friends Rick Stone and Larry Wade. He shows romantic interest in his friend and confidante Frieda Goren, but she is involved with Larry Wade. He dates a girl named Daisy Watkins, but his 'responsibilities' as Static interfere with their dates too many times and Daisy calls their relationship off. In STATIC SHOCK: Rebirth of the Cool, Virgil is involved with a girl named Madison, but Frieda ends up fighting with her over him.

Static confronts numerous bang babies and other super powered adversaries: Hotstreak, Tarmack, Holocaust, Commando X, Puff, Coil, Snakefingers, Rift, The Swarm, Dr. Kilgore, Rubberband Man, Brat-atat-tat, Prometheus, Run, Jump & Burn, Boom Box, Powerfist, LaserJet, etc. Other Bang-Babies that Static has encountered include Virus, D-Struct, and Hyacinth.

==== Static Shock: Rebirth of the Cool ====
In the mini-series Static Shock: Rebirth of the Cool, it is revealed that Virgil has given up his superhero career as Static. He enjoys his time being a normal civilian again, but on occasion misses being a superhero where his friend and confidant Frieda gets him to begrudgingly admit.

Virgil eventually returns to his superhero persona after being persuaded by many of his fellow superheroes, including Blitzen and Hardware, for one final battle.

After the final battle with a man named John Tower who is later revealed to have been the first and greatest superhero in the Milestone Universe, Virgil decides to fully return to his career as Static. Virgil then informs Frieda it likely won't be on a full-time basis as it was before.

==== Working with other heroes ====
Later in the comic line, Static is aided by allies: the Shadow Cabinet, the Blood Syndicate, and DCPD officer Captain Summers, who has a big interest in police cases involving Bang-Babies. Static teams up with Page, the sidekick to Kobalt, to stop a maddened Bang-Baby who had become half-fly. Static takes a moment to scold Page, who, in his opinion, seems more concerned with making excuses over their initial meet up than what was more important, stopping the danger.

Static ends up joining the unofficial group called Heroes. Multiple superheroes come together to protect the town of Iberia from a dam break. Many innocent citizens perish, but the heroes are still recognized for their efforts in saving the survivors and doing what they could. Static appears among the group, quips "You started the X-Men without me", and talks his way onto the team. Minutes later, the Shadow Cabinet, now corrupt, sends a death squad after a few of his newfound friends.

=== DC Universe ===
In Final Crisis, Orion kills his father Darkseid, destabilizing the space-time continuum and threatening the existence of both the Dakotaverse and the mainstream DC universe. Dharma harnesses energy from the entity Rift to merge the two universes, creating an entirely new continuity. Only Dharma, Icon, and Superman are aware that Dakota and its inhabitants ever existed in a parallel universe.

==== Dark Side Club ====
In the prelude to Final Crisis, Darkseid hires the Terror Titans to capture Static, along with a number of other Bang Babies, for use in metahuman death matches in the Dark Side Club. During his tenure in captivity, Virgil is subjected to the Anti-Life Equation and entered into the tournaments. He quickly becomes champion and reigns undefeated for a time, though he proves difficult to control. To Clock King's displeasure, he has to be restricted to the lower levels, where he is kept locked up and heavily sedated. In an attempt to entice Rose Wilson and make a profit, Clock King releases Static and sets him against Rose in the ring. After a drawn-out fight, Static emerges the winner, but briefly breaks free of control before being sedated once more. Static is eventually freed by Rose and takes revenge against his former captors, electrocuting Lashina and her cohorts as they try to escape. He also briefly duels with fellow electricity-wielder Dreadbolt, defeating and binding him in metal along with the other Terror Titans. In his final appearance he's seen joining up with Miss Martian and Aquagirl, planning their next move.

==== Joining the Teen Titans ====
After the Crisis has ended, Static and the other Dark Side Club survivors arrive at Titans Tower to rest. Wonder Girl, the current leader of the team, offers all of the young heroes spots on the team roster, but most of them, including Terra and Zachary Zatara, decline. While exploring the Tower, Virgil strikes up a chemistry with Aquagirl, a teenaged superheroine who was briefly a member of the team during 52. During a conversation with Virgil, she claims that she enjoyed her time with the team, and wishes to join up again, a statement that influences his decision to do the same. He also playfully insults Kid Devil and Jaime Reyes after they attempt to talk to him, mocking Kid Devil over his recent loss of his abilities. He claims that he was abducted by the Terror Titans months beforehand, and realizes that his family must believe him to be dead. Believing he has no place to go for the time being, Static decides to become a Titan and live at the Tower until he can get his life together.

Later, when crazed former Titan Jericho possesses Cyborg and attacks the Titans, Static thwarts him by releasing an electromagnetic pulse that overloads Cyborg's body, saving the rest of the team in the process.

When former Titan Raven shows up at Titans Tower injured and unconscious, Static assists Justice Society of America member Doctor Mid-Nite in helping treat her, using his abilities to sedate Raven when a demon emerges from her body.

==== Return to Dakota ====
Virgil finally decides to see his family again after learning that a deadly virus has been infecting citizens of Dakota, including Sharon. After returning home, Virgil reunites with his family as well as Frieda, and learns that his girlfriend Madison has left him during his absence. He discovers that whoever created the virus is also selling limited supplies of the vaccine, and attacks the lab where it is being made. Upon breaking into the facility, Static is surprised and knocked out by Holocaust.

After refusing to help Holocaust in his pursuits, Static is imprisoned in a specialized containment unit alongside Aquagirl, Wonder Girl, and Bombshell. Holocaust informs the heroes that he plans to kill them and weaponize their abilities to sell them, but is ambushed by the rest of the Titans before this can happen. Holocaust easily defeats them, only to be confronted by Cyborg, who has recruited former Titans Kid Flash and Superboy.

The three hold off Holocaust long enough for Virgil and the others to escape, and ultimately the combined might of all ten Teen Titans is enough to defeat the villain once and for all. After this, Virgil reconciles with Frieda and tells her that he has tricked his family into believing that he has taken part in a quantum physics fellowship, thus giving him an excuse to live in San Francisco with the rest of the Titans. He also makes one last attempt to win back Madison, but she silently rejects him. After this, Virgil and the other Titans decide to head home, with Superboy and Kid Flash as members again.

After a mission to another dimension to rescue Raven, Virgil returns home to find that he no longer has his powers. Furious and scared over his situation, as well as his inability to help Miss Martian awaken from her coma, Virgil attempts to leave the Tower and return to Dakota. He is stopped by Cyborg, who tells Virgil that he will be of no help to anyone back home without his abilities, and tells him that he has arranged for Virgil to be taken to Project Cadmus to find a way to get his powers back. Superboy offers to travel to Cadmus to support his friend, but Virgil tells him that the Titans need him now. Following a farewell breakfast, Static leaves for Cadmus, with Wonder Girl assuring him that he will always have a place on the team.

=== The New 52 ===
Static's 2011 redesign and cover of his second key solo series (Static Shock #1), art by Scott McDaniel.

Following The New 52 continuity reboot, Virgil and his family leave Dakota for New York after an unspecified tragic incident that, among other things, left his sister, Sharon, as two separate, identical entities. Hardware gives Virgil a new costume and modified flying disk (made up of six smaller, hexagonal disks which can re-arrange formation) that enables the two to remain in contact despite living in different cities. Hardware also gives him an internship at S.T.A.R. Labs as an after school job. During his first major battle, Static defeats the villain Sunspot and earns the attention of a criminal syndicate known as the Slate Gang.

Static Shock was cancelled as of issue #8 as part of DC's "Second Wave" of The New 52 titles and replaced by an alternative title.

In Teen Titans, Virgil designs the cape and wing apparatus of Red Robin's new costume while at S.T.A.R.

Later, while recuperating at S.T.A.R. Labs from a previous battle, the Titans seek Virgil's help in curing Kid Flash, whose cells Virgil discovers are rapidly deteriorating as a result of an alteration of his powers. Virgil provides Kid Flash with a new costume (based on a personal sketch for a variant of the Flash's costume) containing materials that realign his molecules while stabilizing his powers, saving Kid Flash in the process.

=== 2021 Milestone Returns ===
Milestone Returns created a new version of Static, combining ideas from previous Static comics and the Static Shock TV series. Several villains original to the series - Ebon, Onyx, Shiv, and Talon - were incorporated into the comics, and pre-existing villains Puff and D-Struct were redesigned to resemble their animated counterparts. Additionally, Rick Stone was renamed Richie Foley and given his animated version's powers and status as the superhero Gear.

Starting in Milestone Returns #0, which takes place in the alternate universe of Earth-93 (also known as Earth-M), 16-year-old Virgil Hawkins goes to a Black Lives Matter protest in the city of Dakota with his friends Frieda and Daisy, where the police use unstable, untested tear gas created by Alva Industries, inadvertently causing the "Big Bang" and granting several people metahuman powers. Curtis Metcalf, a long-time employee of Alva Industries, anticipates Alva will blame him for the incident and goes into hiding. Virgil is found unconscious after the Big Bang and wakes up in the hospital, being watched by his parents and sister. While he is physically unharmed, he stays home from school, getting used to controlling his new powers.

When he returns to school two weeks later, he sees the school bully Francis Stone, now calling himself "Hotstreak", harassing other students. Virgil uses his powers in front of other students to stop Hot-Streak, stopping well before an officer comes to intervene. When the officer comes to see what is going on, Hot-Streak says he slipped. Elsewhere in Dakota, a classmate of Virgil's, Darius, livestreams about the people who have transformed, being called Bang-Babies by the media. Meanwhile, a man named Holocaust starts building an army of metahumans.

In Static: Season One, the day after Virgil's fight with Hot-Streak, several students save for him and Virgil's friends believe someone else fought the bully. Seeking revenge, Hot-Streak attacks Virgil at his home, lighting it on fire. Virgil successfully keeps the damage to a minimum and defeats Hot-Streak once more, but his family develop concerns over his powers while he fears having to fight Hot-Streak again. Virgil contacts Metcalf, having met him previously during an "Inventors of Tomorrow" event, during which the latter informs him of a storage locker he owns. As Virgil explores the locker, the police arrive, believing him to be Metcalf. He dons a mask and suit, grabs as many items as he can carry, and escapes the police. Arriving home, Virgil modifies the suit.

After being captured by government armed forces and joining them in exchange for immunity, Hot-Streak helps them kidnap several Bang Babies. Virgil attempts to stop them, but is stopped by Darius. Hot-Streak and Agent Jones attempt to take Virgil from his home, but his parents bar the pair from entering. With the neighborhood watching, Hot-Streak and Jones are forced to leave empty-handed. As Virgil resolves to rescue the captured Bang Babies, Sharon provides him with glucose tablets so he can re-energize and an emergency line to her. With help from Darius, Frieda, and Ritchie, Virgil finds the facility containing the Bang Babies and takes the name Static.

Upon entering the facility, Virgil fights Hot-Streak, but is able to defend himself and restrain the latter. After Darius locates the Bang Babies, Virgil frees them, but a separate group of Bang Babies hired by the government attempt to stop the breakout. They attack Static, but he defeats them, convincing them that they need to work together. Sending forces to stop him, Jones uses an intercom to warn Virgil to surrender, but Richie discovers the location of Jones' servers, allowing Virgil to overload them while the others escape.

Days later, the Hawkins family reluctantly approve of Virgil becoming a superhero, with Sharon providing him with an updated suit. As the media attempt to spin a story about the Bang Babies attacking the government, Virgil hijacks the signals and tells the truth of what happened.

=== Return to the DC Universe ===
Static subsequently appeared in Batman/Static: Beyond, a limited series that explores a future version of the character alongside Terry McGinnis. The original series was conceived as part of the Milestone 30th-anniversary material and featured an adult Static meeting Batman Beyond. The six-issue Batman/Static: Beyond series was published in 2025–2026, with Evan Narcisse writing and Nikolas Draper-Ivey providing art. The series was collected in August 2026.

The newer Batman/Static: Beyond further establishes Static as a character capable of operating alongside DC's major heroes rather than existing solely within an isolated Milestone setting. The story places Static and Batman Beyond in a futuristic conflict that expands on their earlier meeting while exploring the consequences of their respective approaches to crime-fighting. The six-issue series concluded in 2026.

During 2025 and 2026, DC also began formally integrating the modern Milestone continuity into the main DC Universe. The New History of the DC Universe, written by Mark Waid, established a revised historical framework for the DCU. Its subsequent one-shot, The New History of the DC Universe: The Dakota Incident, expanded upon the history of Dakota and established how Static, Icon, Rocket, Hardware and other Milestone characters fit into the modern DC Universe.

The Dakota Incident incorporates elements from both the original 1990s Milestone continuity and the Milestone Returns continuity. The Big Bang is once again associated with a protest rather than the gang-war scenario used in the original comics, while other elements of the earlier mythology are retained. DC described the new continuity as combining important elements from the 1993–1997 Milestone era and the later Milestone Returns stories rather than treating either version as completely discarded.

The story also establishes the relationship between the Milestone heroes and the DC Universe in greater detail. Although Milestone characters had previously crossed over with DC heroes in stories such as with stories like "Worlds Collide", The Dakota Incident provides a new continuity framework in which the Dakota heroes exist as part of the history of the DC Universe. Static therefore becomes part of the same broader superhero continuity as Superman, Batman, the Titans and the Justice League, while retaining the distinctive social and cultural setting of Dakota City.

Following The Dakota Incident, Static returned to a prominent role in the DC Universe. DC announced that Virgil would become a major character in New Titans beginning with issue #38, following his appearance in DC K.O.: The Kids Are All Fight Special. New Titans #37 includes a short story bridging Virgil's recent appearances with his upcoming involvement with the Titans.

In New Titans #38, Static encounters Jon Kent, the current Superman, as the Titans prepare to confront a threat emerging in the Amazon rainforest of Brazil. Static becomes a key member of the team's mission and is drawn into the Titans' ongoing conflicts and relationships. The storyline represents Virgil's first major DC Universe storyline following his reintroduction through The Dakota Incident.

== Powers and abilities ==
Static and Black Lightning discuss the differences between their abilities while facing an enemy ("The Brave and the Bold" vol. 3 #24). Art by Howard Porter.

Static's powers allow him to control electromagnetic phenomena, in particular allowing him to manifest and manipulate both electrical and magnetic energy—Static's powers could be best described as superconductor electromagnetism; the latter is one of the four fundamental forces of the universe.

Static's powers center around electromagnetism, making him part of both the Earth's and the Sun's respective electromagnetic fields, as well as capable of generating, attracting, absorbing, repelling, channeling, storing, releasing, manipulating, and projecting electromagnetic energy. He can choose to keep the electromagnetic (EM) energy that he currently holds in his body by controlling the electric current--amperage and voltage--for whenever and whatever he wants to use it for. Static's body can generate raw electromagnetic energy, in any form within the electromagnetic spectrum (i.e. regular EM energy into electrical energy, via the photovoltaic effect), which he can control at will for various purposes.

Such uses commonly include magnetizing objects (even able to stop speeding-bullets in mid-air), electrocuting opponents, levitating objects (such as manhole-covers or his self-built metal saucer for use in flight) and people, restraining or adhering people/objects to various surfaces in the form of "static cling", generating "taser punches-&-kicks" (even "taser noogies") with effects similar to a stun gun and at times enough power to send opponents flying during close combat (once even punching a huge bang-baby made of molten magma through a brick wall), various electromagnetic displays as well as electromagnetic constructs, like nets or cages, blinding flashes, generating thrown "ball lightning", producing electromagnetic pulses to incapacitate electronical devices (especially when they're the main weapons used outnumbering enemies), and generating electromagnetic force fields (or assemble magnetized-metals into material barriers) to shield himself from attacks, even stopping bullets in mid-air. In the comic book series, Static has displayed the ability to manipulate subatomic particles, in particular electrons; in at least one instance, he has used this ability as an offensive attack to easily knockout a villain with the villain's own electrons, and in another instance, making an intangible enemy tangible. He can also electrocute nearby enemies.

As well as releasing surges of electromagnetic energy, which he can do from any part of his body, Static can also drain sources of electricity, such as power lines, batteries and fuse boxes to recharge/replenish his own energy supply. He has also displayed the ability to regenerate his powers after being completely drained by energy-draining villains. Whenever Static has used his powers to a high degree, or experience any other such large energy-drain, he will also experience a sudden, acute sense of fatigue, as his electromagnetic powers are tied into his own bioelectric energy levels.

Static can also sense and feel-out sources of electromagnetic energy, like an electromagnetic sensory perception ability, enabling him to tell if a seemingly-abandoned area is actually hot-or-not, and where there is metals (although it is, as-yet, unknown whenever-or-not Static is also capable of magnetoreception, like homing pigeons and sharks can).

In the animated series, Static's powers grant him resistance or immunity to forms of mind control due to his bioelectric field acting as a shield. This trait was adapted into the comic book mythos; within the comics, teammate Miss Martian has even been unable to track him telepathically. In Terror Titans, Static is shown to have resistance to Darkseid's Anti-Life Equation, coming back to his senses.

Static has repeatedly displayed the ability to absorb and alter energy from enemy attacks and redirect the energy at said enemy, even radiation, as certain kinds of radiation are electromagnetic radiation (see the electromagnetic spectrum, Gamma rays, Microwaves, etc.); in Teen Titans, he has even absorbed Kryptonite radiation from a poisoned Superboy and redirected it at an enemy. Static is able to use his powers to generate microwave energy to generate heat to combat ice attacks. He's also able to listen-in on radio waves, allowing him to listen to music, and even the police radio broadband; he can also use them to home-in on custom-made tracking-devices.

Static can use his powers in combination with items, like wire, assembled à la a cat's cradle, like the wire in filament in an Incandescent light bulb, to create powerful bursts of light, he calls "Nova Burst:, for the same tactical use like a flashbang grenade, to blind and disorientate opponents. Such a tactic is most effective against adversaries like Ebon (who is vulnerable to light), similar to his "Nova Ball", and against most people (save for the blind), but less-so against opponents like Aquamaria, whose body is transparent. Static can also use his powers to make bioelectric auras visible.

Virgil Hawkins is a gifted student with a particular interest in the sciences. He is a talented inventor and a natural strategist. Tim Drake has stated that Virgil's understanding of molecular and sub-atomic structures rivals the Flash.

Static's body has been shown to automatically heal itself, even from what would otherwise be lethal wounds, when drawing in large amounts of energy from a nearby energy source and energy to matter conversion.

Virgil also possesses an almost fanboyish knowledge of comic books, role playing games, pop culture, and science fiction.

Following the events of "Flashpoint", Static is given a new flying disk that now contains a holographic interface and is capable of collapsing into separate pieces or re-configuring into various forms for various uses and applications. In addition to allowing Static to remain in contact with Hardware, the disk also displays charts and other information relevant to the mission at hand. Virgil has also begun using a three-piece, detachable Bō-staff, both activated-by—and used in conjunction with—his powers, for use in close-ranged fighting.

=== Weaknesses ===
Static's primary weaknesses are insulators; wood, cloth, rubber, glass, fibreglass, plastics and ceramics, etc., as his powers have little or no effect on them, as shown in his battle with Rubberband-Man. Wood seems to be the one he has the most difficulty with, as it cannot be electromagnetically manipulated, levitated or damaged (though Static can use his powers to ignite wood and cloth, and to melt glass and plastic, etc.). This can, however, be gotten-around if objects (metals, etc.) that he can manipulate are available (i.e. while wood-itself doesn't conduct electricity, if a piece of wood has a metal nail embedded in it, he can levitate it, via the metal nail), and certain materials, while they may not, themselves, be conductors of electricity and electromagnetism, are subjectable to static electricity.

As mentioned above, his electromagnetic powers are tied into his own bioelectric energy levels; whenever Static has used his powers to a high degree, or experience any other such large energy-drain, he will also experience a sudden, acute sense of fatigue and must re-charge from a pre-existing source of electricity to supplement his depleted energy levels if he cannot have the time to restore them through rest.

== Supporting characters ==
Static's supporting cast varies between incarnations, but Virgil's relationships with his family and friends remain an important part of the character. In the original Milestone comics, Virgil's parents are Robert and Jean Hawkins, and his older sister is Sharon. Virgil's closest friends include Frieda Goren, Rick Stone and Larry Wade, while Daisy Watkins is one of his romantic interests. Frieda is particularly important to the original series because she discovers Virgil's secret identity and becomes his principal confidante.

- Robert Hawkins: Virgil's father. In the original comics he works at Paris Island Hospital, while later versions give him different professions and responsibilities. Robert and Jean are generally presented as protective parents whose relationship with Virgil becomes complicated by his decision to become a superhero. In Static: Season One, the Hawkins family becomes aware of Virgil's activities considerably earlier than in the original series and eventually accepts his decision to become Static.
- Jean Hawkins: Virgil's mother. She is alive in the original Milestone comics and in the 2021 Milestone Returns continuity. In Static Shock, Jean was killed during the Dakota riots several years before the series begins, leaving Robert to raise Virgil and Sharon. The animated version of Jean's death forms an important part of the television series' characterization of Virgil and his family.
- Sharon Hawkins: Virgil's older sister. She is a recurring member of his family and, depending on the continuity, is involved in counseling, medicine or other forms of community work. In the 2021 comics, Sharon plays an active role in helping Virgil manage the physical demands of his powers and assists him during his first major attempt to rescue other Bang Babies.
- Frieda Goren: One of Virgil's closest friends and his principal confidante in the original Milestone comics. She discovers his secret identity after witnessing his attempt to protect her during one of his early adventures. Frieda subsequently helps Virgil maintain his double life and becomes one of the most important people in his civilian life. Her relationship with Virgil also develops a romantic dimension in later stories. In the 2021 continuity, Frieda remains one of Virgil's closest friends and accompanies him to the protest that leads to the Big Bang.
- Rick Stone: One of Virgil's friends. In the original comics, Rick is part of Virgil's civilian circle and assists him on several occasions. In the 2021 Milestone Returns continuity, he is reimagned as Richie Foley and transforms him into the superhero Gear, incorporating elements from Static Shock. This version therefore combines the role of the original comic character with the identity and superhero status established by the animated series.
- Larry Wade: One of Virgil's friends in the original Milestone series. He is also involved romantically with Frieda, creating a complicated relationship between the three characters. Larry represents an important part of Virgil's civilian life, which frequently conflicts with the demands of being Static.
- Daisy Watkins: Another of Virgil's friends and, in the original series, becomes his girlfriend. Virgil's repeated inability to balance his relationship with his responsibilities as Static eventually contributes to the end of their relationship. Daisy also appears in the 2021 Milestone Returns continuity, where she is one of Virgil's friends present at the protest that triggers the Big Bang.
- Holocaust: One of Static's major recurring enemies. He is a powerful Bang Baby who seeks to organize other metahumans into an army. He appears in both the original Milestone mythology and subsequent versions of Static, although aspects of his characterization and role differ between continuities. In the 2021 storyline, he begins building an army of metahumans following the Big Bang.
- Hot-Streak: Originally kniwn as Martin Scaponi, is Static's oldest and most recognizable enemy across multiple versions of the character. He is a teenager who gains fire-based powers during the Big Bang. In the 2021 continuity, going by Francis Stone, he is already known to Virgil as a school bully before their powers emerge, and their rivalry becomes one of the first major conflicts of Virgil's career as Static.

== Other versions ==
Static appears as a major character in the 2010 limited series Milestone Forever, a project designed to detail the final fates of the Milestone launch characters prior to entering DC's continuity. In Static's tale, Virgil is retired and pursuing a career in medicine. Rick (now known by his television moniker of "Richie") is also now working as a director in Los Angeles and is open about his homosexuality. Ten years later, Virgil has become a doctor and married Frieda; their two children, Larry and Sadie, inherited his electrical abilities.

== In other media ==
=== Television ===
- Static appears in series set in the DC Animated Universe (DCAU), voiced by Phil LaMarr.
  - Static first appears as the titular protagonist of Static Shock. This version is a fourteen-year-old honors student at Dakota Union High School who lives with his widowed father and social worker, Robert Hawkins, and his sister Sharon Hawkins, a university student and counselor at the Freeman Community Center. Additionally, Virgil's mother, paramedic Jean Hawkins, was killed five years prior to the series during the Dakota Riots. Similar to the comics, Virgil gains his powers while reluctantly taking part in a gang war and getting caught in an explosion caused by mutagenic gas called "Quantum Vapor" in an event that would later be dubbed the "Big Bang" by the media. Everyone exposed to the gas gained powers and became known as "Bang Babies", with Virgil gaining electromagnetic powers and going on to become Static to battle villainous Bang Babies.
  - An adult Static appears in the Static Shock episode "Future Shock" and the Justice League Unlimited episode "The Once and Future Thing, Part 2: Time, Warped". As of the future setting of preceding DCAU series Batman Beyond, he has joined the Justice League.
- Static appears in Young Justice, voiced by Bryton James. This version is one of several teens who were abducted and experimented on by the Reach, through which he acquired his powers after they activated his latent meta-gene. After being rescued by the Team, he and three other abductees are transferred to S.T.A.R. Labs' custody, but they escape and are later recruited by Lex Luthor to help the Light combat the Reach until Arsenal tells them the truth about Luthor. After working with Black Lightning to thwart the Reach's invasion of Earth, Static studies under his tutelage and joins the Team. Two years later, during Young Justice: Outsiders, Static has honed his powers further with Black Lightning's help before going on to join the Outsiders.
- Static makes a cameo appearance in the Teen Titans Go! episode "Four Hundred".
- A live-action Static Shock program by Warner Bros. from Reginald Hudlin was to be developed as part of the company's new Blue Ribbon Content digital division, and were eyeing Jaden Smith for the title role. Actor Tyler James Williams said in an interview that Smith was cast as Static, but this was not confirmed by Blue Ribbon Content or Warner Bros.

=== Film ===
- Virgil Hawkins makes a non-speaking cameo appearance in Justice League: War. This version's appearance is similar to his Young Justice counterpart.
- When asked if Static would receive a feature film set in the DC Animated Universe as part of the DC Universe Animated Original Movies, producer James Tucker responded that there was interest. However, there have been no further discussions for such a project.
- At DC FanDome held in August 2020, a live-action Static Shock film was revealed to be in development. The project will be a collaboration between DC Films, Warner Bros. Pictures, and Milestone Media. By October of the same year, Michael B. Jordan joined the production team as co-producer alongside Reginald Hudlin. Jordan's company, Outlier Society, will serve as one of the production studios and Randy McKinnon was picked to write the film in March 2021.
- An animated film about Static and other Milestone heroes is currently in development at Warner Bros. Animation.
- In July 2025, when asked whether Static would appear in the DC Universe, franchise co-creator James Gunn stated that there are no immediate plans due to rights issues.

=== Video games ===
Cover of cancelled Static Shock Game Boy Advance video game.

- In May 2003, Midway Games announced the production of a platformer Static Shock video game for the Game Boy Advance, developed by Vicarious Visions. While the game was displayed at the Electronic Entertainment Expo, it was later cancelled.
- Static appears in DC Universe Online as part of the Lightning Strikes DLC. This version is a member of the Teen Titans.
- Static appears as a downloadable playable character in the mobile version of Injustice: Gods Among Us.
- Static was intended to appear as a playable character in Injustice 2 before ultimately being cut.

=== Miscellaneous ===
In 2022, DC Comics, Milestone Media, and Warner Bros. Discovery partnered with Ally Financial and NASCAR to debut a sponsorship and new Static-based paint scheme for Alex Bowman's No. 48 Chevrolet Camaro ZL1 1LE for Hendrick Motorsports, in support of DC's The Milestone Initiative program.
