= DC Animated Universe =

Shared fictional universe

- Created by: DC Comics; Warner Bros. Animation
- Original work: Batman: The Animated Series (1992–1995)
- Owners: Warner Bros. Entertainment (Skydance)
- Years: 1992–2006; 2017–2019
- Based on: Characters by DC Comics

Print publications
- Comics: List of comics

Films and television
- Films: List of films
- Short films: List of short films
- Television series: List of television series

Games
- Video games: List of video games

The DC Animated Universe (DCAU), also referred to as the Timmverse or Diniverse by fans, is a shared fictional universe based on DC Comics properties and media franchise produced by Warner Bros. Animation. It began with Batman: The Animated Series in 1992 and ended with Justice League vs. the Fatal Five in 2019. The associated media franchise includes theatrical and direct-to-video feature films, shorts, comic books, video games, and other multimedia adaptations.

The DC Animated Universe has been praised for its storytelling, voice acting, animation, and maturity, with several of its shows listed among the greatest animated television series of all time. It has also influenced the mainstream DC Comics in various ways, such as introducing new characters, revamped backstories, and character designs.

== List of DC Animated Universe media ==
While there are many animated projects based upon DC Comics characters, the DC Animated Universe consists of TV series and films that spin off from Batman: The Animated Series. While the series is largely standalone, two characters outside of the normal Batman canon, Zatanna and Jonah Hex, would guest star. However, the first series to indicate a shared continuity with other well-known characters was Superman: The Animated Series, in which the title character encounters heroes such as Batman, the Wally West version of Flash, the Green Lantern Kyle Rayner, Aquaman, and Doctor Fate. The follow-up sequel to Batman: The Animated Series, titled The New Batman Adventures would feature an art style revamp similar to Superman: The Animated Series, and these two shows would feature crossovers. Both of those shows would be followed by Batman Beyond, which featured an elderly, retired Bruce Wayne passing on the mantle to Terry McGinnis, the Batman of the future.

After Batman Beyond's third season, the Justice League show followed, which starred Batman, Superman, Wonder Woman, The Flash (Wally West), Green Lantern (John Stewart), Martian Manhunter (J'onn J'onzz), and Hawkgirl. After two seasons, the series was rebranded as Justice League Unlimited, a successor series which expanded the League roster and was the final series set in the DC Animated Universe.

In between these shows was also Static Shock, which told the story of Virgil Hawkins and showcased a different aspect of the DC Animated Universe. It was the first time an African American superhero was the titular character of his own animated show. It explored many diverse stories and characters throughout its run. Another show that aired was The Zeta Project, which was a spin-off series based on the character Zeta from the Batman Beyond episode of the same name, an android who is on the run from NSA agents. The Zeta Project is largely unconnected to the larger DC Animated Universe, with Zeta appearing in one episode of Batman Beyond following his introduction and Batman appearing in one episode of The Zeta Project.

=== Television series ===
The DC Animated Universe consists of the following animated television series:

Series	Season	Episodes	Originally released			Showrunner(s)	Connections
Series	Season	Episodes	First released	Last released	Network	Showrunner(s)	Connections
Batman: The Animated Series	1	65	September 5, 1992	September 17, 1993	Fox Kids	Bruce Timm	Starting point for the DC Animated Universe; Introductions: Zatanna ("Zatanna") and Jonah Hex ("Showdown")
Batman: The Animated Series	2	20	May 2, 1994	September 15, 1995	Fox Kids	Bruce Timm	Starting point for the DC Animated Universe; Introductions: Zatanna ("Zatanna") and Jonah Hex ("Showdown")
Superman: The Animated Series	1	13	September 6, 1996	February 15, 1997	Kids' WB	Bruce Timm	Crossovers with The New Batman Adventures: "World's Finest", "Knight Time", and "The Demon Reborn"; Introductions: Lobo ("The Main Man"), Wally West ("Speed Demons"), Doctor Fate ("The Hand of Fate"), Steel ("Heavy Metal"), Green Lantern Corps ("In Brightest Day..."), and Aquaman ("A Fish Story")
Superman: The Animated Series	2	28	September 8, 1997	May 2, 1998	Kids' WB	Bruce Timm	Crossovers with The New Batman Adventures: "World's Finest", "Knight Time", and "The Demon Reborn"; Introductions: Lobo ("The Main Man"), Wally West ("Speed Demons"), Doctor Fate ("The Hand of Fate"), Steel ("Heavy Metal"), Green Lantern Corps ("In Brightest Day..."), and Aquaman ("A Fish Story")
Superman: The Animated Series	3	13	September 19, 1998	February 12, 2000	Kids' WB	Bruce Timm	Crossovers with The New Batman Adventures: "World's Finest", "Knight Time", and "The Demon Reborn"; Introductions: Lobo ("The Main Man"), Wally West ("Speed Demons"), Doctor Fate ("The Hand of Fate"), Steel ("Heavy Metal"), Green Lantern Corps ("In Brightest Day..."), and Aquaman ("A Fish Story")
The New Batman Adventures	1	24	September 13, 1997	January 16, 1999	Kids' WB	Bruce Timm	Crossovers with Superman: The Animated Series: "Girl's Night Out"; Introductions: Etrigan ("The Demon Within") and Creeper ("Beware The Creeper")
Batman Beyond	1	13	January 10, 1999	May 22, 1999	Kids' WB	Bruce Timm	Crossovers with The Zeta Project: "Countdown" "Plague"; Introductions: Infiltration Unit Zeta ("Zeta") and Justice League Unlimited ("The Call"); aswell as Agent Bennet and Ro.
Batman Beyond	2	26	September 17, 1999	May 27, 2000	Kids' WB	Bruce Timm	Crossovers with The Zeta Project: "Countdown" "Plague"; Introductions: Infiltration Unit Zeta ("Zeta") and Justice League Unlimited ("The Call"); aswell as Agent Bennet and Ro.
Batman Beyond	3	13	August 19, 2000	December 18, 2001	Kids' WB	Bruce Timm	Crossovers with The Zeta Project: "Countdown" "Plague"; Introductions: Infiltration Unit Zeta ("Zeta") and Justice League Unlimited ("The Call"); aswell as Agent Bennet and Ro.
Static Shock	1	13	September 23, 2000	May 12, 2001	Kids' WB	Dwayne McDuffie	Integrated into the DCAU from Season 2 onwards; Crossovers with The New Batman Adventures: "The Big Leagues", "Hard as Nails"; Justice League: "A League of Their Own", "Fallen Hero"; Superman: The Animated Series: "Toys in the Hood"; The New Batman Adventures and Batman Beyond: "Future Shock"
Static Shock	2	11	January 26, 2002	May 4, 2002	Kids' WB	Dwayne McDuffie	Integrated into the DCAU from Season 2 onwards; Crossovers with The New Batman Adventures: "The Big Leagues", "Hard as Nails"; Justice League: "A League of Their Own", "Fallen Hero"; Superman: The Animated Series: "Toys in the Hood"; The New Batman Adventures and Batman Beyond: "Future Shock"
Static Shock	3	15	January 25, 2003	June 21, 2003	Kids' WB	Dwayne McDuffie	Integrated into the DCAU from Season 2 onwards; Crossovers with The New Batman Adventures: "The Big Leagues", "Hard as Nails"; Justice League: "A League of Their Own", "Fallen Hero"; Superman: The Animated Series: "Toys in the Hood"; The New Batman Adventures and Batman Beyond: "Future Shock"
Static Shock	4	13	January 17, 2004	May 22, 2004	Kids' WB	Dwayne McDuffie	Integrated into the DCAU from Season 2 onwards; Crossovers with The New Batman Adventures: "The Big Leagues", "Hard as Nails"; Justice League: "A League of Their Own", "Fallen Hero"; Superman: The Animated Series: "Toys in the Hood"; The New Batman Adventures and Batman Beyond: "Future Shock"
The Zeta Project	1	12	January 27, 2001	August 11, 2001	Kids' WB	Robert Goodman	Crossovers with Batman Beyond: "Shadows" and "Ro's Gift"
The Zeta Project	2	14	March 23, 2002	August 17, 2002	Kids' WB	Robert Goodman	Crossovers with Batman Beyond: "Shadows" and "Ro's Gift"
Justice League	1	26	November 17, 2001	November 9, 2002	Cartoon Network	Bruce Timm	Introductions: Metamorpho ("Metamorphosis")
Justice League	2	26	July 5, 2003	May 29, 2004	Cartoon Network	Bruce Timm	Introductions: Metamorpho ("Metamorphosis")
Justice League Unlimited	1	13	July 31, 2004	January 29, 2005	Cartoon Network	Bruce Timm	Crossovers with Static Shock and Batman Beyond: "The Once and Future Thing"; Batman Beyond: "Epilogue"
Justice League Unlimited	2	13	February 5, 2005	July 23, 2005	Cartoon Network	Bruce Timm	Crossovers with Static Shock and Batman Beyond: "The Once and Future Thing"; Batman Beyond: "Epilogue"
Justice League Unlimited	3	13	September 17, 2005	May 13, 2006	Cartoon Network	Bruce Timm	Crossovers with Static Shock and Batman Beyond: "The Once and Future Thing"; Batman Beyond: "Epilogue"

=== Feature films ===
The DCAU continuity also includes the following feature films:

Film	U.S. release date	Director	Screenwriters	Release	Notes
Batman: Mask of the Phantasm	December 25, 1993	Eric Radomski and Bruce Timm	Story by: Alan Burnett; Screenplay by: Alan Burnett, Paul Dini, Martin Pasko and Michael Reaves	Theatrical	Continuation of Batman: TAS
Batman & Mr. Freeze: SubZero	March 17, 1998	Boyd Kirkland	Boyd Kirkland and Randy Rogel	Direct-to-DVD	Continuation of Batman: TAS
Batman Beyond: Return of the Joker	December 12, 2000 (edited version) April 23, 2002 (uncut version)	Curt Geda	Story by: Paul Dini, Glen Murakami and Bruce Timm; Screenplay by: Paul Dini	Direct-to-DVD	Continuation of Batman Beyond, Batman: TAS, and The New Batman Adventures
Batman: Mystery of the Batwoman	October 21, 2003	Curt Geda	Story by: Alan Burnett; Screenplay by: Michael Reaves	Direct-to-DVD	Continuation of Batman: TAS and The New Batman Adventures
Batman and Harley Quinn	August 14, 2017	Sam Liu	Story by: Bruce Timm; Screenplay by: Bruce Timm and Jim Krieg	Direct-to-DVD	Continuation of Batman: TAS and The New Batman Adventures
Justice League vs. the Fatal Five	March 29, 2019 (WonderCon Anaheim) March 30, 2019	Sam Liu	Story by: Eric Carrasco; Screenplay by: Eric Carrasco, Jim Krieg and Alan Burnett	Digital HD, DVD and Blu-ray	Continuation of Justice League Unlimited

=== Short films ===
Film	U.S. release date	Director	Screenwriters	Notes
The Dark Knight's First Night	1991	Bruce Timm & Eric Radomski	Story by : Bruce Timm; Teleplay by : Eric Radomski	A short film which acted as the developmental pilot for Batman: TAS.
Justice League: The First Mission	2000	James Tucker	Story by: Bruce Timm	A short film which acted as the developmental pilot for Justice League.
Chase Me	October 21, 2003	Curt Geda	Paul Dini and Alan Burnett	A short film with no dialogue based on The New Batman Adventures.
Batman Beyond	April 20, 2014	Darwyn Cooke	Darwyn Cooke	A short film based on Batman Beyond created by Darwyn Cooke for Batman's 75th anniversary. The short features the original voice cast of the show, as well as cameos of robotic batmen from The New Batman Adventures, The Batman, Batman: The Brave and the Bold, Beware the Batman, The Dark Knight Returns, Michael Keaton's Batman, Adam West's Batman, and the original comic book Batman from 1939.

=== Digital series ===
Series	Season	Episodes	Originally released		
Series	Season	Episodes	First released	Last released	Network
Lobo	1	14	June 15, 2000	September 14, 2000	warnerbros.com
Gotham Girls	1	11	July 27, 2000	December 14, 2000	warnerbros.com
Gotham Girls	2	10	June 5, 2001	October 9, 2001	warnerbros.com
Gotham Girls	3	10	July 16, 2002	November 19, 2002	warnerbros.com

== Offshoot material ==
The DCAU also includes tie-in materials such as comic books, video games, and direct-to video films with a similar animation style; however, their continuity is disputable. While they are sometimes marketed as being part of the DCAU, some of these works have contradictory elements or are written by a different team.

For instance, many of the DCAU tie-in comics were written by a different team than the animated crew, such as the Ty Templeton penned The Batman Adventures comic series. However, some of the comics, such as the Batman: The Adventures Continue comics were written by the animated series writers, Paul Dini and Alan Burnett. Per the opinion of Bruce Timm, who has commented about the continuity of the DCAU comics previously, said "we didn't have any direct input on the comics...DC never solicited our opinions on what they were doing, nor would we have had time to give them notes if they had--I learned very early on not to get my nose bent out of joint if they did something in the comics we would never have done--my own personal way of dealing with it was to consider only the animated episodes themselves as true canon-which means that even Mad Love wasn't purely canonical until we adapted it for the animated series."

In terms of feature films, the 2006 feature film Superman: Brainiac Attacks has been stated by writer Duane Capizzi that it was not intended to be part of the DCAU, despite using the same animation style and many of the voice actors from Superman: The Animated Series.

=== Cancelled projects ===
An animated series based on the Teen Titans comic books was planned for the DC Animated Universe during the mid-1990s, but was ultimately scrapped, however the team was confirmed to exist in the universe in the Static Shock (which was also not initially intended to be part of the DCAU until the second season) episode "Hard as Nails" with Robin confirmed to be a member by Batman. Instead a Teen Titans series not related to the DC animated universe was released. Also, after the success of Batman: The Animated Series in the early 1990s, Fox approached producer Bruce Timm to create a spin-off series focusing on Catwoman, but the project never materialized.

In 1998, writer John P. McCann had been tasked with coming up with a Lobo animated series in the DC Animated Universe, with Brad Garrett set to reprise his role as the character, but the show had been cancelled right before production. A few elements of the show would find its way in the 2000 Lobo webseries, an online Flash animated series starring Lobo, the galactic bounty hunter, however whether the webseries is part of the official DCAU is unclear. A wax statue with the same character design as Lobo in this series appeared in an episode of Gotham Girls which somewhat support that the webseries is part of the official DCAU, although this is still disputed. Unlike the other shows set in the DCAU, it has graphic violence, sexual content, strong profanity, and a lack of tie-ins with the greater DCAU.

Before the release of Batman Beyond: Return of the Joker, a third animated feature based on Batman: The Animated Series was planned, entitled Batman: Arkham. The film was supposed to be a follow-up for Batman & Mr. Freeze: SubZero, and Boyd Kirkland was attached to write and direct; but the project was soon scrapped. A second Batman Beyond movie was planned for release but was finally scrapped due to the dark tones and controversies of Return of the Joker in 2001. Around 2003, during the production of Batman: Mystery of the Batwoman, Warner Bros. approached Kirkland to write a Catwoman direct-to-video feature film as a tie-in with the 2004 live-action film. Although the script was written, the project was soon scrapped after the poor reception of the live-action film.

Also, a direct-to-video feature-length animated film entitled Justice League: Worlds Collide was planned to connect Justice League with its follow-up Justice League Unlimited, but the production was finally cancelled in 2004, and the script was later rewritten for the animated film Justice League: Crisis on Two Earths, removing all connections to the DCAU.

In the early 2020s, Warner Bros. Animation approached Bruce Timm with the idea of producing a revival of Batman: The Animated Series set after the events of The New Batman Adventures, but Timm refused to develop a Batman show that was a continuation to The Animated Series, only being interested in a revival of Justice League that Warner wasn't interested in, with Timm opting to develop instead a new Batman series, that being Batman: Caped Crusader.

=== Comic books ===
Many of the DCAU productions have also had comic books created based on the characters of the various series, though their continuity is disputable. The comics are:

Year	Title	Issues
1992	The Batman Adventures (vol. 1)	#1–36; Mad Love; Holiday Special; Batman: Mask of the Phantasm; Annuals (#1–2)
1993	Superman & Batman Magazine	#1–8
1995	Batman and Robin Adventures	#1–25; Annuals (#1–2); Batman & Mr. Freeze: Sub-Zero; Dark Claw Adventures
1996	Superman Adventures	#1–66; Annual; World's Finest; Superman vs. Lobo; Exclusive Edition (Superman '64 prequel)
1996	Two-Face: Two of a Kind	#0
1997	Adventures in the DC Universe	#1–19; Annual
1998	The Batman Adventures: The Lost Years	#1–5
1998	Batman: Gotham Adventures	#1–60
1998	Batgirl Adventures	One-Shot
1999	Batman Beyond (vol. 1)	#1–6
1999	Batman Beyond (vol. 2)	#1–24; Return of the Joker
1999	Claritin Syrup Presents Batman	One-Shot
2001	Gotham Knights	#14 (backstory by Paul Dini)
2002	Gotham Girls	#1–5
2002	Justice League Adventures	#1–34 #1-8 (Burger King miniseries)
2003	Batman Adventures (vol. 2)	#1–17
2003	Batman: Shadow of Sin Tzu	#1–260
2004	Batman: Harley and Ivy	#1–3
2004	Justice League Unlimited	#1–46
2010	Batman Beyond (vol. 3)	#1–6
2010	Superman/Batman Annual	#4
2011	Batman Beyond (vol. 4)	#1–8
2011	Superman Beyond	#0–20
2012	Justice League Beyond	#1–25
2012	Batman Beyond Unlimited	#1–18
2013	Batman Beyond 2.0	#1–40
2013	Justice League Beyond 2.0	#1–24
2013	Batman Beyond Universe	#1–16
2015	Batman Beyond (vol. 5)	#1-16
2015	Scooby Doo Team Up	#12, #17, #23, #24 (series uses DCAU character models but ignores the lore)
2016	Batman/TMNT Adventures	#1-6
2016	Batman Beyond (vol. 6)	#1-50; Rebirth
2016	Love is Love	Harley and Ivy story by Paul Dini
2016	Harley Quinn	#17-26 (backstory by Paul Dini) (used the art style and character models but has been stated before its follow-up mini-series "Harley loves Joker" to be in continuity to the current main universe instead)
2017	Harley Quinn and Batman	#1-5 (a prequel to the 2017 animated film Batman and Harley Quinn)
2017	Batman and Harley Quinn	#1-7 (a sequel to the 2017 animated film of the same name)
2018	Harley loves Joker	#1-2 (used the art style and character models, is also a follow-up to the Harley Quinn main series backstory but is then hinted to be in continuity to the main comic universe in Harley Quinn #42 with the "next issue" area and then is stated to be in the main universe by its official description)
2020	Batman: The Adventures Continue Season One	#1-8 (print); 17 (digital)
2021	Batman: The Adventures Continue Season Two	#1-7
2021	Justice League: Infinity	#1-7
2023	Batman: The Adventures Continue Season Three	#1-8
2026	Batman/Static Beyond	#1-6

== Recurring cast and characters ==
List indicators

This section includes characters who will appear or have appeared in in the franchise.

- An empty grey cell indicates the character was not in the film, or that the character's official presence has not yet been confirmed.
- ^{A} indicates an appearance through archival footage or audio.
- ^{C} indicates a cameo role.
- ^{P} indicates an appearance in onscreen photographs.
- ^{U} indicates an uncredited appearance.
- ^{V} indicates a voice-only role.
- ^{Y} indicates a younger version of the character.

Character	TV Series								Films					
Character	Batman: The Animated Series	Superman: The Animated Series	The New Batman Adventures	Batman Beyond	Static Shock	The Zeta Project	Justice League	Justice League Unlimited	Batman: Mask of the Phantasm	Batman & Mr. Freeze: SubZero	Batman Beyond: Return of the Joker	Batman: Mystery of the Batwoman	Batman and Harley Quinn	Justice League vs. the Fatal Five
Heroes and Allies
Bruce Wayne Batman	Kevin Conroy	Kevin Conroy	Kevin Conroy	Kevin Conroy	Kevin Conroy	Kevin Conroy	Kevin Conroy	Kevin Conroy	Kevin Conroy	Kevin Conroy	Kevin Conroy	Kevin Conroy	Kevin Conroy	Kevin Conroy
Dick Grayson Robin/Nightwing	Loren Lester	Mentioned	Loren Lester	Mentioned			Cameo	Cameo		Loren Lester	Mentioned		Loren Lester	
Barbara Gordon Batgirl	Melissa Gilbert	Mentioned	Tara Strong	Stockard Channing, Angie Harmon			Cameo	Mentioned		Mary Kay Bergman	Angie Harmon, Tara Strong (flashback)	Tara Strong		
Tim Drake Robin		Mathew Valencia	Mathew Valencia	Mentioned	Eli Marienthal, Shane Sweet		Cameo	Mentioned			Dean Stockwell, Mathew Valencia (flashback)	Eli Marienthal		Cameo
Alfred Pennyworth	Efrem Zimbalist Jr., Clive Revill	Efrem Zimbalist Jr.	Efrem Zimbalist Jr.		Efrem Zimbalist Jr.		Efrem Zimbalist Jr.		Efrem Zimbalist Jr.	Efrem Zimbalist Jr.		Efrem Zimbalist Jr.		
Commissioner James Gordon	Bob Hastings	Bob Hastings	Bob Hastings	Cameo	Bob Hastings				Bob Hastings	Bob Hastings	Mentioned	Bob Hastings		
Detective Harvey Bullock	Robert Costanzo	Robert Costanzo	Robert Costanzo		Robert Costanzo				Robert Costanzo	Robert Costanzo		Robert Costanzo		
Clark Kent Superman		Tim Daly	Cameo	Christopher McDonald	George Newbern		George Newbern	George Newbern						George Newbern
Lois Lane		Dana Delany	Cameo	Mentioned			Dana Delany	Dana Delany						
Kara In-Ze Supergirl		Nicholle Tom	Nicholle Tom					Nicholle Tom				Mentioned		
Jimmy Olsen		David Kaufman					David Kaufman	Cameo						
Jonathan Kent		Mike Farrell					Mike Farrell							Mentioned
Martha Kent		Shelley Fabares					Shelley Fabares							
Jor-El		Christopher McDonald					Cameo	Christopher McDonald						Mentioned
Terry McGinnis Batman				Will Friedle	Will Friedle	Will Friedle		Will Friedle			Will Friedle			
Dana Tan				Lauren Tom				Lauren Tom			Lauren Tom			
Wally West Flash		Charlie Schlatter			Michael Rosenbaum		Michael Rosenbaum	Michael Rosenbaum						
John Henry Irons Steel		Michael Dorn						Phil LaMarr						
John Stewart Green Lantern					Phil LaMarr		Phil LaMarr	Phil LaMarr						Mentioned
Shayera Hol Hawkgirl					Maria Canals		Maria Canals	Maria Canals						Mentioned
J'onn J'onzz					Carl Lumbly		Carl Lumbly	Carl Lumbly						Mentioned
Virgil Hawkins Static					Phil LaMarr			Phil LaMarr						
Diana of Themyscira Wonder Woman		Mentioned			Mentioned		Susan Eisenberg	Susan Eisenberg						Susan Eisenberg
Villains
Jack Napier The Joker	Mark Hamill	Mark Hamill	Mark Hamill	Cameo	Mark Hamill		Mark Hamill	Mentioned	Mark Hamill		Mark Hamill	Mentioned	Mentioned	Mentioned
Harleen Quinzel Harley Quinn	Arleen Sorkin	Arleen Sorkin	Arleen Sorkin	Cameo	Arleen Sorkin		Arleen Sorkin				Arleen Sorkin		Melissa Rauch	Cameo
Pamela Lillian Isley Poison Ivy	Diane Pershing		Diane Pershing		Diane Pershing		Diane Pershing						Paget Brewster	Cameo
Ra's al Ghul	David Warner	David Warner		David Warner										
Oswald Cobblepot The Penguin	Paul Williams	Paul Williams	Paul Williams	Cameo				Mentioned				David Ogden Stiers		
Edward Nygma The Riddler	John Glover	John Glover	John Glover	Cameo							Cameo			
Rupert Thorne	John Vernon											John Vernon		
Jervis Tetch The Mad Hatter	Roddy McDowall	Roddy McDowall	Roddy McDowall	Cameo							Cameo			
Bane	Henry Silva	Henry Silva	Henry Silva	Cameo								Héctor Elizondo		
Dr. Jonathan Crane The Scarecrow	Henry Polic II		Jeffrey Combs											
Victor Fries Mr. Freeze	Michael Ansara		Michael Ansara	Michael Ansara				Mentioned		Michael Ansara	Cameo			
Arnold Wesker Ventriloquist and Scarface	George Dzundza		George Dzundza				Cameo			Cameo				
Selina Kyle Catwoman	Adrienne Barbeau		Adrienne Barbeau	Cameo				Mentioned				Mentioned		
Harvey Dent Two-Face	Richard Moll		Richard Moll	Cameo			Cameo				Cameo			Bruce Timm
Matt Hagen Clayface	Ron Perlman		Ron Perlman				Ron Perlman							
Temple Fugate The Clock King	Alan Rachins							Alan Rachins						
Garfield Lynns Firefly			Mark Rolston				Mark Rolston							
Lex Luthor		Clancy Brown					Clancy Brown	Clancy Brown						
Mercy Graves		Lisa Edelstein					Lisa Edelstein	Lisa Edelstein						
Darkseid		Michael Ironside					Michael Ironside	Michael Ironside						
Brainiac		Corey Burton			Corey Burton		Corey Burton	Corey Burton						
Kalibak		Michael Dorn					Michael Dorn	Michael Dorn						
Granny Goodness		Ed Asner						Ed Asner						
Winslow P Schott Jr Toyman		Bud Cort			Bud Cort		Corey Burton	Bud Cort						
John Corben Metallo		Malcolm McDowell					Corey Burton	Malcolm McDowell						
Rudy Jones Parasite		Brion James					Brian George	Brian George						
Sinestro		Ted Levine			Ted Levine		Ted Levine	Ted Levine						
Lobo		Brad Garrett					Brad Garrett							
Claire Selton Volcana		Peri Gilpin					Peri Gilpin	Cameo						
General Hardcastle		Charles Napier						Charles Napier						
Gorilla Grodd							Powers Boothe	Powers Boothe						

=== Comics ===
The Batman Beyond comic series is a loose adaptation of the Batman Beyond franchise, intended to fit the character and storylines from the series into the mainstream DC continuity. The miniseries began in June 2010, under the title Future Evil. In August 2010, the series was announced to continue following the completion of the first arc as an ongoing series. That series concluded alongside the entire line of ongoing monthly DC Comics superhero books during the 2011 revamp and relaunch, titled The New 52.

Superman Beyond, a one-shot comic set in the same universe as Batman Beyond, was released in 2011.

Batman Beyond Unlimited, a title chronicling the adventures of the future Justice League introduced in the DCAU, was released in February 2012. This series published monthly triple-sized issues, containing three stories of Terry McGinnis, Clark "Cal" Kent, and the future Justice League Unlimited, respectively.

Batman Beyond Universe succeeded Unlimited in August 2013, condensing to double-monthly issues upon the elderly Superman's rejoining the future Justice League.

Terry McGinnis was the central figure in The New 52: Futures End weekly series.

In 2015–2016, DC Comics and IDW Publishing released a jointly produced, six-issue miniseries comic titled Batman/TMNT, where the New 52 Batman encounters the IDW incarnation of the Teenage Mutant Ninja Turtles. The success of this miniseries inspired a similar crossover story, with Batman's DCAU incarnation meeting the Amazing Adventures comic version of the 2012 CGI series' Turtles. Titled Batman/TMNT Adventures, the concept was first announced in late July 2016 and scheduled for a six-issue release starting November 9, 2016.

A comic book continuation of seven-issues of Justice League Unlimited, called Justice League Infinity, was released monthly between July 2021 and January 2022; the series is set after the show's finale and explores the consequences of Darkseid's disappearance and the League clashing with their alternate universe counterparts.

== Outside media ==
=== Video games ===
Several DCAU tie-in video games were released to correspond with the various animated television series and films. Some of these games have original plots, while others follow previous stories; their status in DCAU continuity is unknown. The games are:

Year	Title	Platforms
1993	Batman: The Animated Series	Game Boy
1994	The Adventures of Batman & Robin	Super NES, Mega Drive/Genesis, Sega CD/Mega-CD, Game Gear
1997	Superman	Game Boy
1999	Superman	Nintendo 64
2000	Batman Beyond: Return of the Joker	Game Boy Color, PlayStation, Nintendo 64
2001	Batman: Chaos in Gotham	Game Boy Color
2001	Batman: Gotham City Racer	PlayStation
2001	Batman: Vengeance	PlayStation 2, Game Boy Advance, GameCube, Xbox, Windows
2002	Justice League: Injustice for All	Game Boy Advance
2002	Static Shock (canceled game)	Game Boy Advance
2002	Superman: Shadow of Apokolips	PlayStation 2, GameCube
2003	Batman: Rise of Sin Tzu	Xbox, PlayStation 2, Game Boy Advance, GameCube
2003	Justice League: Chronicles	Game Boy Advance
2003	Superman: Countdown to Apokolips	Game Boy Advance
2016	View-Master Batman Animated VR	iOS, Android

Six of these games feature voice acting from the casts of the original shows. These are: The Adventures of Batman and Robin (Sega CD/Mega-CD version), Superman, Batman Vengeance, Superman: Shadow of Apokolips, Batman: Rise of Sin Tzu, and View-Master Batman Animated VR. The Sega CD/Mega-CD game, The Adventures of Batman and Robin, also features animation from one of the studios that worked on Batman: The Animated Series.

=== The Heart of Batman ===
A 90-minute documentary film was released on October 16, 2018, as part of the Batman: The Complete Animated Series Deluxe Limited Edition and Batman: The Complete Animated Series Blu-ray/Digital box set, and was later made available on the official Warner Bros. Entertainment YouTube channel.

== See also ==
- Arrowverse (2012–23)
- DC Extended Universe (2013–23)
- DC Animated Movie Universe (2013–24)
- DC Universe (2024–present)
