= Michael Davis (comics creator) =

American comics artist (born 1958)

- Born: April 29, 1958 (age 68)
- Areas: Artist, writer
- Notable works: Milestone Media
- Awards: Inkpot Award (2013)

Michael Davis (born April 29, 1958) is an American comics artist, writer, and one of the co-founders of Milestone Media.

== Career ==
Davis entered the comics industry in the late 1980s through authoring an advice column for the Comic Buyer's Guide. Around this time he also founded Bad Boy Studios to mentor younger creators. In 1989, he collaborated as an artist with Tim Conrad on the series Etc. for DC Comics' Piranha Press.

In 1992, Davis co-founded Milestone Media, a company focused on creating black superheroes, founding it alongside Dwayne McDuffie, Denys Cowan, and Derek T. Dingle. Davis contributed to the creation of characters including Hardware, Static, Icon, and the Blood Syndicate, but focused more on the business side of the venture, with Dingle.

After leaving Milestone in 1994, he launched Motown Machine Works, where he was joined by Cowan. He served as president/CEO of Motown Animation & Filmworks but left in 1996. He was also President of Animation for Magic Johnson Entertainment. In 2006 he created The Guardian Line comic for Urban Ministries. He has written regular columns for the website ComicMix and "From the Edge" for Bleeding Cool. Davis was inducted into The Harvey Awards Hall Of Fame.

== The Black Panel ==
Michael Davis started the Black Panel, a mix of Black and non-Black members of the entertainment industry, at San Diego Comic-Con in 1997. Comics are one of the essential parts of the panel.

On April 11, 2025, Michael Davis participated in a 90-minute live interview about The Black Panel and himself, conducted at the Zennie62 YouTube Channel.
