= Derek T. Dingle =

American editor (born 1961)

- Born: November 2, 1961 (age 64); New York City, U.S.
- Occupations: Editor and publishing executive
- Years active: 1983–present
- Known for: Co-founding Milestone Media
- Title: Editor-in-chief of Black Enterprise

Derek T. Dingle (born November 2, 1961) is an American editor and publisher known for co-founding Milestone Media and being the editor-in-chief of Black Enterprise.

== Early life ==
Dingle was born in New York City on November 2, 1961. He received a bachelor's degree in journalism from Norfolk State University and also studied magazine management at New York University.

== Career ==
He became an assistant editor at Black Enterprise magazine in 1983, and was promoted several times, eventually serving as managing editor from 1987 until 1990. That year, he left the publication and became a staff writer at Money magazine.

In 1993, Dingle co-founded Milestone Media with Dwayne McDuffie, Denys Cowan, Michael Davis, and Christopher Priest. They intended to publish comic books with more diverse stories than other comic book companies at the time. Dingle served as president and CEO of the company.

Dingle returned to Black Enterprise in 1999 as editor-at-large. That year, he published the book Black Enterprise Titans of the B.E. 100s: Black CEOs Who Redefined and Conquered American Business. Dingle was given the first exclusive print interview with US President Barack Obama in February 2009. He was subsequently invited to a presidential roundtable on Air Force One in July 2009. As of 2014, Dingle was editor-in-chief and co-chief content officer of Black Enterprise.

== Awards and nominations ==
In 2013, Dingle received an Inkpot Award. He and the other Milestone founders were included in the Harvey Awards Hall of Fame in 2020.
