= Judge Dredd (board game) =

Board game

Judge Dredd, subtitled "The Game of Crime-Fighting in Mega-City One", is a board game published by Games Workshop (GW) in 1982 that is based on the dystopian comic series Judge Dredd that appeared in the British comic magazine 2000 AD. It was designed by Ian Livingstone, the co-founder of Games Workshop.

In 2022, Rebellion republished the game, alongside the Richard Halliwell games, Block Mania and Mega-Mania.

== Description ==
Judge Dredd is a board game for 2–6 players where each players takes on the role of a Judge in Mega-City One.

=== Components ===
The game box contains:

- 16" x 22" mounted gameboard (in two pieces)
- 54 Action cards
- 21 Sector cards
- 28 Perp cards
- 28 Crime cards
- 6 Judge cards
- 24 page card album
- 6 player pawns
- 4-page rulebook
- six-sided die

=== Gameplay ===
==== Set-up ====
Each player chooses a Judge and takes a token. There are always six crimes occurring in the city at any time. Six Sector cards are flipped over to reveal the location of the current batch of crimes, then a Crime card is placed face up at each location along with a facedown Perp card.

==== Movement phase ====
All players move 1 or 2 Sectors towards Sectors where the current crimes are located.

==== Arrest phase ====
When a player arrives at the crime scene, the Perp card is flipped over and the player tries to make an arrest. Each Judge has a base arrest value of 5. The player rolls the die, and adds the Judge's Arrest rating supplemented by any special cards the player wishes to play. This total must equal or exceed the sum of the Crime card's value, the Perp card's value and a die roll. Other players can play cards to assist either the arresting Judge or the Perp.

If the Judge fails to make the arrest, the Judge's token is placed in the Intensive Care Area of the Justice Department Hospital sector, and the player loses their next turn. The Crime and Perp cards remain on the board.

If the Judge makes a successful arrest, the Crime and Perp cards are placed face-up in front of the arresting player. A new Sector card is flipped over, and a new Crime and Perp card are added to the board, bringing the total number of active crimes back up to six.

=== Victory conditions ===
When the Sector deck is empty and all Perps on the board have been arrested, players add up the values of all of the Crime and Perp cards they collected during the game. The player with the most points is the winner.

== Publication history ==
The Judge Dredd comic by Pat Mills first appeared in the monthly British comics anthology 2000 AD in 1977. Five years later, GW acquired the license to produce a Judge Dredd board game, which was designed by Ian Livingstone, with artwork by Brian Bolland and Ian Gibson.

GW also produced several other Judge Dredd products, including

- Judge Dredd: The Role-Playing Game (1985),
  - two adventures for the role-playing game: Judgement Day (1986) and Slaughter Margin (1987)
- the board game Block Mania (1987)
  - a Block Mania expansion, Mega-Mania (1987)

== Reception ==
In Issue 25 of Abyss, Jon Schuller called this "a remarkable little board game ... the atmosphere of the game makes it particularly fun because players can identify with the odd characters and situations easily and really develop a mood and feeling of good-hearted competition." Schuller concluded, "I heartily recommend Judge Dredd. It is easy to learn and quick to play, and just a whole lot of fun if you like strategy games which are not too heavy-handed and deadly serious."

Richard Meadows reviewed Judge Dredd for White Dwarf No. 35 (also published by GW), giving it an overall rating of 9 out of 10, and stated that "Judge Dredd is a good game for some light relaxation for both Dredd fans and those who have never heard of him. It is admirably successful in its aims: it doesn't set out to be a game of deep skills and great complexity; it sets out to be simple, playable and as enjoyable as reading your favourite comic book - and if Judge Dredd is your favourite comic-book hero, so much the better."

Paul Cockburn reviewed Judge Dredd for Imagine magazine, and called it "a fine game, with excellent opportunities for player inter-action and fine balance. If you like mayhem, this has to be a winner".

In Issue 76 of Dragon (August 1983), Michael Gray thought the game "captures the theme" through the "appealing artwork." However, Gray found Judge Dredd could be "quite a frustrating exercise" because of the propensity of players to gang up on someone who appears to be winning. He didn't think this was a terribly complex game, warning players that "it takes no brainpower to play." He concluded with ambivalence, saying, "Judge Dredd is fun, but other games are fun and have more going for them as well."

Steve Jackson reviewed Judge Dredd in Space Gamer No. 67. Jackson commented that "If you're a Judge Dredd fan, you'll buy it no matter what the reviews say, so be comforted; you will like it. In fact, it works both ways; I became a fan after reading through the game. If you don't read Judge Dredd, you might still enjoy it as a beer-and-pretzels game (albeit a long one), if you can handle the steep imported price tag."

== Reviews ==
- Jeux & Stratégie #18
- Adventure Gaming #13
