= Dark Future =

Board game

Original game box, 1988

Dark Future is a post-apocalyptic miniatures wargame published by Games Workshop in 1988.

== Description ==
Dark Future is a Mad Max-like game of vehicular combat set in an alternate world.

=== Setting ===
The game is set in a fictional alternate world United States in 1995, ten years after the American government privatised all police forces. The country has been divided into Policed Zones – mainly large cities – and Non-Policed Zones, mainly the highways and areas between cities. Ecological disaster has overtaken the country as well, with the Great Lakes having shrunk to a fraction of their size, and the Midwest turned into a desert. The players take on the role of mercenaries called "Sanctioned Operatives" or "Ops", who are hired for a variety of missions on the unpoliced highways.

=== Game Components ===
The large 36" box comes with:

- 104-page 2-holed punched illustrated rulebook with perforated pages
- "Read Me First" quickplay rules
- 17 sections of interlocking laminated track
- 4 plastic cars with interchangeable weapons
- 4 plastic motorcycles
- markers
- counters
- acetate range ruler
- three six-sided dice, one slightly larger than the others
- two ziplock bags for counter storage

=== Gameplay ===
Vehicles can move at their rated speed each turn, and can accomplish a variety of actions while moving including drifting, U-turning, accelerating, braking, reversing, regaining control, ramming, and firing weapons.

=== Scenarios ===
The book includes eight scenarios of increasing tactical complexity.

== Publication history ==
In the late 1980s, GW game designer Marc Gascoigne was designing a post-apocalyptic role-playing game called Dark Future that was set in the United States. At the same time, Richard Halliwell was designing a miniatures vehicular combat board game using many of the rules he had developed for the Judge Dredd board game Slaughter Margin. When Gascoigne's role-playing game project was shelved, his post-apocalyptic setting in the United States was grafted onto Halliwell's vehicular combat game. The merger, featuring artwork by Tony Ackland, Dave Andrews, John Blanche, Mark Craven, Carl Critchlow, Colin Dixon, David Gallagher, Pete Knifton, Mike McVey, Tim Pollard, Bil Segwick, Andrew Wildman, and Nick Williams, was published by GW in 1988 as Dark Future. At the same time, Citadel Miniatures released a line of metal miniatures that could be used with the game.

Later the same year, GW also published a game expansion, White Line Fever, that featured more vehicles and weapons, and more tactics. Several more rules expansions and scenarios were also published in various issues of White Dwarf.

In 1990, GW published an anthology of Dark Future short stories titled Route 666, edited by David Pringle. This was followed by a number of Dark Future novels, including the Demon Download Cycle supposedly penned by a Sanctioned Operative named "Jack Yeovil" (actually Kim Newman): Demon Download (1990), Krokodil Tears (1990), and Comeback Tour (1991). Reissues were published by Boxtree Ltd in 1993, and were followed by Dark Future: Route 666 (1994), a novel expanded from Newman's story in the anthology of the same name. From 2005–2007, Black Flame published a number of new novels as well as republishing some of the original GW and Boxtree books. The timeline of the original Demon Download Cycle was updated from the 1990s to the 2020s.

In May 2019, a video game adaptation, Dark Future: Blood Red States, was released. According to the review aggregate website Metacritic, it received "generally favorable reviews".

== Reception ==
In the September 1989 edition of Dragon (Issue 149), Jim Bambra admired the physical components of the game, which he called "impressive." He concluded, "gamers looking for a fast-playing game of highway combat will find the Dark Future game worthy of recommendation."

In the April–May 1990 edition of Challenge (#43), John Theisen liked the simple game mechanics and the high-quality game components. But, considering the very high price of the game ($48 in 1990), he was disappointed "by a lack of versatility in design. There are only three types of vehicle and only 16 types of weapon." He pointed out that more vehicles and weapons were available in the White Line Fever supplement, but said, "as a customer, I'd be pretty perturbed to find myself shelling out 48 bucks only to find out that I need to spend another $16(!) to get what should have been included in the first place." Theisen concluded, "All in all, Dark Future is a good game — but not a great one."

In the February–March 1989 edition of Games, Matthew Costello called it "fast-paced, straight-forward in its Mad Max confrontations. And I hope that all of this automotive mayhem is therapeutic. Because it certainly is fun".

== Reviews ==
=== Game reviews ===
- Casus Belli #48
- Computer and Video Games

=== Fiction reviews ===
==== Demon Download ====
- Simon Ings

==== Krokodil Tears ====
- Simon Ings
- Sweet Despise

==== Comeback Tour ====
- Simon Ings

==== Ghost Dancers ====
- Ian Braidwood
- Buzzsprout

== Rules expansions and scenarios ==
=== White Dwarf ===
- 100: "Highway Warriors!" - preview
- 102: Preview
- 103: "Illuminations" - Review of Carl Critchlow, Thrud the Barbarian and Dark Future Artist.
- 104: "Redd Harvest" - Scenario
- 105: "Street Fighter" - Rules for extra-vehicular combat
- 106: "A Day at the Races" - New car types and equipment for racers.
- 107: "White Line Fever": Advanced Manoeuvres, and rules for Trikes and motorcycle combinations
- 108: "White Line Fever": Advanced Shooting
- 110: "Tournament Rules" - Simplified rules for quick play
- 112: "St. Louis Blues" - Scenario
- 124: Dead Man's Curve, part 1 - Advanced rules for campaigns, weather, darkness, psychosis, salvage, experience
- 125: Dead Man's Curve, part 2 - More advanced rules for success, fame, recruitment, cybernetics, hacking and gamemasters.

=== Challenge ===
- 52: "Sand Cats" - Scenario

== Dark Future fiction ==
=== Anthologies ===
- Route 666 (short story anthology), edited by David Pringle, GW (1990)

=== Demon Download Cycle ===
- Demon Download by Kim Newman/Jack Yeovil, GW (1990); Boxtree Ltd (1993); Black Flame (2005)
- Krokodil Tears by Kim Newman/Jack Yeovil, GW (1990); Boxtree Ltd (1993); Black Flame (2006)
- Comeback Tour by Kim Newman/Jack Yeovil, GW (1991); Boxtree Ltd (1993); Black Flame (2007)

=== Other novels ===
Route 666, Boxtree Ltd edition (1993), by Kim Newman (writing as Jack Yeovil)

- Ghost Dancers by Brian Stableford (writing as Brian Craig), GW (1991); Boxtree Ltd (1991) – Based on the story "Kid Zero and Snake Eyes" in the anthology Route 666.
- Dark Future: Route 666 by Kim Newman (writing as Jack Yeovil), GW (1993); Boxtree Ltd (1994); Black Flame (2006) – A novel expanded from the short story "Route 666", originally published in GW's anthology of the same name.

=== Black Flame revival ===
- Golgotha Run by Dave Stone, Black Flame (2005)
- American Meat by Stuart Moore, Black Flame (2005)
- Jade Dragon by James Swallow, Black Flame (2006)
- Reality Bites by Stuart Moore, Black Flame (October 2006, ISBN 1-84416-408-X)

=== Unpublished novels ===
A final book, United States Calvary, was promised in Comeback Tour (2007) but was never produced. A finished manuscript for a novel titled Violent Tendency by Eugene Byrne was lost when the writer's computer crashed.

== See also ==
- Battlecars, an earlier battling car game by Games Workshop.
- Car Wars, created by Steve Jackson Games in 1980.
