= Judge Dredd Companion =

Role-playing game supplement

Cover art by Christos Achilleos, 1987

Judge Dredd Companion is a supplement published by Games Workshop (GW) in 1987 for Judge Dredd: The Role-Playing Game, itself based on the Judge Dredd comics.

== Description ==
The Judge Dredd Companion supplies new material for gamemasters to use in their Judge Dredd role-playing campaigns. The book includes:

- new rules, including optional supernatural abilities and superhero abilities
- more background details of Mega-City One
- two short encounters called "Code 14s"
- a short solo adventure for a new player, "On the Beat"
- two full-length adventures for more experienced players:
  - "Channel 9 Crime Time Special"
  - "Fear and Loathing in Mega-City One"

== Publication history ==
Judge Dredd first appeared in the British comics anthology 2000 AD in 1977. GW acquired the license to produce Judge Dredd: The Role-Playing Game, and published the game in 1985. Over the next year, GW produced only one piece of supporting material, the adventure Judgement Day. In 1987, two years after the role-playing game had been released, GW published a number of Judge Dredd items, including the adventures Citi-Block and Slaughter Margin, and the supplement Judge Dredd Companion, a 120-page hardcover book with bound-in maps and cut-out components designed by Marc Gascoigne, with illustrations by Christos Achilleos.

== Reception ==
In Issue 4 of The Games Machine, John Woods was happy to see the Judge Dredd Companion — he liked the Judge Dredd role-playing game and felt that it had been underserved by GW. He thought the production values were very good, and the two full-length scenarios were "the high spots of the book." He also complimented the new rules about the supernatural "Exorcism Division". He concluded, "All in all, there's a lot here that will please all Judge Dredd fans. [...] The Judge Dredd Companion is recommended for any Judge Dredd GM's collection."

In Issue 35 of Challenge, John A. Theisen also thought this was material long overdue, and highly recommended it, saying, "If you respect Law and Order (well, Law anyway), you better pick up a copy of this — quick, before a Judge runs you in for loitering!"

== Reviews ==
- Casus Belli #43 (Feb 1988)
