= Richard Halliwell (game designer) =

British game designer (1959–2021)

- Born: 29 March 1959
- Died: 1 May 2021 (aged 62)
- Occupation: Game designer

Richard Fretson Halliwell (29 March 1959 – 1 May 2021) was a British game designer who worked at Games Workshop (GW) during their seminal period in the 1980s, creating many of the games that would become central to GW's success.

== Career ==
=== Early games ===
As teenagers living in Lincoln, England in the 1970s, Richard Halliwell and his school friend Rick Priestley liked to play tabletop miniature wargames. In 1979, while still in school, they decided to create a set of rules for a fantasy miniatures wargame they called Reaper. Halliwell and Priestley found a small company, Tabletop Games, that was willing to publish their small booklet but had no sales outlet. They contacted Bryan Ansell of Asgard Miniatures in Nottingham; he put them in touch with the Nottingham Model Soldier Shop, who agreed to sell Reaper.

With one rulebook for sale, Halliwell and Priestley collaborated on a second effort, a science fiction miniatures wargame titled Combat 3000, also published by Tabletop, that used 15mm/25mm "space marine" miniatures from Asgard.

About this time, Bryan Ansell, with financial backing from Games Workshop, left Asgard Miniatures to form Citadel Miniatures in Newark. Halliwell got a job there, but found that he also liked to travel abroad frequently, and soon stepped back from fulltime employment, preferring to do odd jobs and freelance work for Citadel, usually as a mould maker.

=== Imperial Commander ===
During this time (in 1981), he and Ansell collaborated on the rules for a science fiction wargame called Imperial Commander that featured a titanic struggle between two vast forces. It was again published by Tabletop Games. It is a 15mm science fiction war game, based on the range of metal Laserburn miniatures available from Tabletop Games. The game still has a small but enthusiastic following. Battles take place between an oppressive, galaxy spanning "Imperium" and the religious, fanatic "Red Redemption". Players take in turns to move, fight and command armies of between twenty and fifty miniature figures each, and following the rules, tabletop games lasting a few hours are played. This type of war game is played on a tabletop with miniature figures, vehicles and scenery. Two or more players are required. An updated version of this game, called Imperial Commander 2 was in development; however, it was never published because of copyright issues.

The background of Imperial Commander and the rule system of Laserburn are an influence on Games Workshop's Warhammer 40,000 tabletop game which was developed when Ansell and Halliwell were at Games Workshop and Citadel Miniatures. In addition it has been a major influence on the development of the Beamstrike rule set.

=== Warhammer ===
By 1982, Bryan Ansell wanted to create a set of rules for miniatures wargames that would drive sales of Citadel's miniatures. Halliwell, as a freelance employee, had plenty of time on his hands, and was given the task of writing the rules. He came up with the idea of an overarching fantasy campaign set on a continent called Lustria. Like his previous game, Imperial Commander, this would feature a never-ending war between titanic forces. Once Halliwell was finished with the rules, Rick Priestley and Tony Ackland developed the product, and it was released by sister company Games Workshop in 1983 as Warhammer The Mass Combat Fantasy Role-Playing Game. On the development process, Priestley said, "It was actually my colleague Richard Halliwell who was originally commissioned to write it. I developed it with him, because we often worked on things together". Mechanics of the game were derived from their earlier game Reaper.

Halliwell was on the development team of the second edition of Warhammer Fantasy Battle in 1984, as well as Warhammer Fantasy Roleplay in 1986, and the third edition of Warhammer in 1987. Halliwell and Ansell, with Priestley as editor, wrote Ravening Hordes: The Official Warhammer Battle Army Lists in 1987.

=== Other GW games ===
In 1987, Halliwell stepped away from the Warhammer universe to develop several other projects. GW had produced Judge Dredd: The Role-Playing Game in 1985, a dystopian post-apocalyptic role-playing game based on the Judge Dredd comics. In 1987, Halliwell designed a tongue-in-cheek combat game called Block Mania that was set in the Judge Dredd universe, in which residents of two city blocks must cause as much harm as possible to each other before the Judges arrive to restore order. He followed this with Mega-Mania, a four-player expansion, and Slaughter Margin, a Judge Dredd adventure scenario. He also helped design Citi-Block, a Judge Dredd supplement. After the 2020 rerelease of Block Mania and Mega-Mania, the UK print magazine Tabletop Gaming highlighted that "Richard Halliwell knew his source material well, ensuring it's all thematically bang-on, and satisfying to die-hard Dredd fans. But it feels more like a curious relic, a collector's piece, than something which seriously deserves to take tabletop time away from newer, player-friendlier games".

In 1988, Halliwell worked with Marc Gascoigne to design Dark Future, a Mad Max-like combat board game featuring a violent car race across North America. PCGamesN highlighted that "Dark Future drew on the marvellous design instincts of Richard Halliwell, then just a year away from publishing Space Hulk and introducing the word 'overwatch' to the sci-fi gaming lexicon".

In 1989–1990, Halliwell reached the height of his game design career, winning two Origins Awards in two years. In 1989, he was the "sole designer credited" on the first edition of Space Hulk, a tense and suspenseful tactical science fiction miniatures game in which the dangerous alien lifeforms known as Genestealers have infested a derelict ship drifting in space, and the heroic Space Marines must board the ship to accomplish a given goal. At the 1990 Origins Awards, Space Hulk was named Best Fantasy or Science Fiction Boardgame of 1989.

The following year, Halliwell collaborated with Matt Forbeck and Jervis Johnson to produce two Space Hulk expansions, Deathwing, and Genestealer. At the 1991 Origins Awards, Genestealer won Best Fantasy or Science Fiction Boardgame of 1990. The following year, Halliwell helped design Space Hulk Campaigns, a set of new scenarios for his Space Hulk game.

== Life after Game Workshop ==
Following his successes, Halliwell left GW and stepped away from game design. Graeme Davis posted on Twitter on May 3, 2021, that Richard Halliwell had died.
