= Judge Dredd: The Role-Playing Game =

Tabletop science fiction role-playing game

Judge Dredd
The Role-Playing Game
- 1st edition boxed set, 1985
- Designers: Marc Gascoigne; Rick Priestley
- Publishers: Games Workshop
- Publication: 1985 1st edition, boxed set; 1989 2nd edition, hardback
- Genres: Science fiction
- Systems: Custom
- ISBN: 978-1869893620

Judge Dredd: The Role-Playing Game is a science fiction role-playing game published by Games Workshop in 1985. A second edition was published in 1989.

== Contents ==
Judge Dredd is a comic book superhero system in which the player characters are super-police officers, "Judges", in a wretched future society. Based on the popular British comic-book series, the game is grim but humorous. The 1st edition has a "Judge's Manual" (player's book, 72 pages) and a "Game Master's Book" (128 pages); they are combined in the one-volume 2nd ed. Characters are created with basic skills and learn further abilities as these skills increase. The GM's section covers scenarios, crimes, and criminals in detail, plus there is an index of Mega-City slang. The 2nd edition is indexed and includes the hand-to-hand and vehicle combat rules from the Judge Dredd Companion.

== Description ==
Judge Dredd: The Role-Playing Game, was published under license by Games Workshop in the 1980s and used a rules system created specifically for the game, which resembled GW's Warhammer Fantasy Roleplay. Players create a starting character by rolling eight Characteristics: Strength (S), Initiative (I), Combat Skill (CS), Drive Skill (DS), Technical Skill (TS), Street Skill (SS), Medical Skill (MS), and Psi Skill (PSI). Strength is rolled on a table using a 10-sided die and is a value rated from 2 to 4: 2 is "Average" (1-6, or 60%), 3 is "Strong" (7-9, or 30%), and 4 is "Very Strong" (10, or 10%); this stat also doubles as the character's Hit Points. The other stats are derived by rolling two 10-sided dice and adding 20 points, generating a result between 22 and 40; there is a maximum of 100 points in each Characteristic. A character who rolls a starting score of 30 or more in a Characteristic starts play with a Special Ability (like Quick Draw Lawgiver Pistol or Jump Lawmaster Cycle) and gain an additional one per every 10 points above 30. Characters who score a natural or enhanced 40 or more in the Technical, Medical or Psi Skills may start respectively as Specialist Tech-, Med-, or PSI-Judges and gain unique Special Abilities.

The box set rules (1985) came with a Game Master's Book (game rules and background data), a Judge's Book (player's manual), 2 maps and a set of cardboard figure sheets, and a set of five polyhedral dice (one each of 4-, 6-, 8-, 10- and 12-sided dice). The Judge's Companion (1987), featuring artwork of PSI-Judge Anderson on the cover, was a rules expansion and adventure anthology that came in softcover and hardcover editions. The later hardbound edition of the Judge Dredd rulebook (1989) combined the Game Master and Judge's Books into one volume and added some content from the Judge's Companion.

== Publication history ==
Judge Dredd - The Roleplaying Game was written by Rick Priestley, with a cover by Terry Oakes, and was published by Games Workshop in 1985 as a boxed set containing two books (128 pages and 72 pages), a large color map, a cardstock miniatures sheet, and dice. The second edition was published by Games Workshop in 1989 as a 142-page hardcover book.

Games Workshop stopped making and supporting the game system in 1992 and dropped it from their catalogue. They later lost the license to the property in 1995 and had to destroy all non-sold stock in their warehouse.

=== Support ===
Games Workshop published a Judge Dredd map expansion detailing a housing block called Citi-Block. This contained conversion rules for its use as a Hiveworld in the Warhammer 40K wargame.

Their in-house gaming magazine, White Dwarf featured articles and adventures for the RPG. They also published a rules supplement and sold limited-edition themed miniatures for their Blood Bowl game (a fantasy version of American football set in their Warhammer Fantasy universe) which included a team of Judges and a team of Fatties.

Additional material for the RPG included the adventures Judgement Day and Slaughter Margin. Judgement Day concerned a plot by traitors and brainwashed sleeper agents both within and outside the Justice Department to destroy Mega City One. The Judges have to find them before they release a weaponized virus that was made immune to current treatment. Slaughter Margin's plot was about a cell of Nippon City survivors seeking to avenge the destruction of their Megacity during President Booth's Atomic War by nuking Mega City One in retaliation. The Judges have to work with Japanese Judges from Hondo City before the terrorists set off their bombs.

Block Mania (1987), a wargame set in Mega City 1, was based on the Judge Dredd "Block War" storyline. Players represent the Citi-Defence forces of one of two Housing Blocks (named after historical figures Sammy Fox and Buddy Holly). Each Block is fighting a "Block War" against neighboring rival Housing Blocks using their arsenal of advanced weapons. Successful attacks penetrate armor or damage interior spaces and reduce the Block's structural integrity. The winner is the last Block left intact. This was expanded with additional rules and game pieces from the Mega-Mania box set (1987) (which added the Sly Stallone, and Richard Nixon Blocks) and the Happy Hour article featured in White Dwarf #94.

Games Workshop also produced a range of licensed figures for the setting. Citadel Miniatures made Judge Dredd figures and sold them in 3-piece blister packs. Judge Dredd and PSI-Judge Anderson figures came in two-piece "hero" packs - one figure shows the character standing and another shows the character seated on a Lawmaster cycle. A special limited-edition 77-piece box set for use with the Slaughter Margin adventure module was also available for £40; many were later reused for their Warhammer 40K line. The Judge Dredd license was then taken on by Wargames Foundry who continues to produce a range of figures and paints for their line of 2000 AD characters.

== Reception ==
Jason Kingsley reviewed Judge Dredd - The Role-Playing Game for White Dwarf #73, giving it an overall rating of 10 out of 10, and stated that "All in all, Judge Dredd - The Role-Playing Game is an excellent product, for detail, value and content. Dredd fans will be pleased with it."

The Games Machine reviewed Judge Dredd - The Role-Playing Game and stated that "The game captures the atmosphere and tone of the comic extremely well. Any roleplayer who enjoys Judge Dredd's adventures should get a lot of fun out of it."

In his 1990 book The Complete Guide to Role-Playing Games, game critic Rick Swan thought the "generous amount of artwork from the comics" made this game "as much fun to read as to play. However, as almost all of the rules are directed to violent encounters, the game lacks depth and it's not likely to sustain long campaigns." Despite this, Swan awarded the game a rating of 3 out of 4, saying, "But in small doses, Judge Dredd is undeniably exciting, even for players who have never laid eyes on the comics."

Paul Pettengale, the editor of the British games magazine Arcane, did a retrospective review of Judge Dredd: The Role-Playing Game in 1996, stating that "This was a highly professional [...] system of game mechanics, and it is still easily the most enjoyable set of rules I've played." Later that year, Arcane published a readers' poll to determine the 50 most popular roleplaying games of all time, and Judge Dredd was ranked 21st. Pettengale commented: "This is one of the best roleplaying systems ever created. It oozes atmosphere and spits out gritting violence and playability, and generally makes for a very good time indeed. The excellent way in which the rules are laid out (and written), helps referees to start running the game almost straight out of the box. In our eyes, it should have featured in the top ten."

== Reviews ==
- GameMaster Publications #2 (Dec., 1985)
- Dark Realm Magazine (Vol 1, Issue 1 - 1987)
- Comics Feature #43
