= Slaughter Margin =

Tabletop role-playing game supplement

Slaughter Margin is an adventure and supplement published by Games Workshop (GW) in 1987 for Judge Dredd: The Role-Playing Game, itself based on the Judge Dredd comics.

== Description ==
Slaughter Margin is a boxed set that includes a complete scenario book, geomorphic floorplans and maps for locations in Mega-City One, and four sheets of counters, three overlay sheets, and eight sheets of players' aids.

== Publication history ==
The Judge Dredd role-playing game was first published under license by GW in 1985. Over the next two years, GW only published two supplements, Citi-Block and Judge Dredd Companion, and one adventure, Judgement Day. Slaughter Margin followed, being both a scenario and a supplement that included a 48-page scenario book written by Richard Halliwell, with art by Gordon Moore, and cardstock maps and extras.

== Reception ==
In White Dwarf #89, Richard Halliwell stated that "There's a lot in the Slaughter Margin box. It's certainly more than just a single Judge Dredd adventure with a few floor plans."

In the August 1987 edition of Casus Belli (#40), Pierre Rosenthal found both good and bad things in this package. He called the scenario superb. Likewise, he thought that all of the extras were of excellent quality. But he pointed out that the included extras were not necessary to play the scenario, and asked why the two elements -- the adventure, and the city plans and counters — had not been sold as two separate products, pointing out that by combining the two, "What was an inexpensive scenario then becomes an expensive supplement."
