= Xuasus =

Spanish comics artist

Xuasus is the pseudonym of Spanish comic book artist Juan Jesus Garcia (Mieres, 1968).

== Biography ==
Xuasus' chunky, fully painted style was admired by David Bishop, editor of the Judge Dredd Megazine, in the early 1990s, and the artist was commissioned to work on a number of well-known characters, including Judge Dredd, Judge Anderson, Judge Hershey and the Brit-Cit Brute. Xuasus has also contributed to the Teenage Mutant Ninja Turtles and Victor titles.

His latest contribution is the "Waccy Baccy Races" series for the magazine Wasted in collaboration with Alan Grant. He now combines his work in comics with film projects.

He worked as a matte painter and VFX Art Director on the cities of Jerusalem and the Castle of Kerak on Kingdom of Heaven. He also created the virtual Waterfall City for Dinotopia and was a matte painter on Troy, Rome and Harry Potter II. He now works in Vancouver, Canada as a matte painter.

== Works ==
=== Bibliography ===
Comics work includes:

- Judge Hershey (in Judge Dredd Megazine vol.2 #12, 1992)
- Judge Dredd (in Judge Dredd Megazine vol.2 #19, 21, 27-29 & 34-35, 1993)
- Judge Anderson (in Judge Dredd Megazine vol.2 #54-56, 1994)
- Teenage Mutant Ninja Turtles
- Commando
- Victor
- X-Bow
- France Routes
- Bonty
- La Nueva Espana
- Wild Crew
- Lletres Asturianes

=== Partial filmography ===
- 300: Rise of an Empire
- Seventh Son
- Percy Jackson: Sea of Monsters
- The Lone Ranger
- Man of Steel
- Jack the Giant Slayer
- Life of Pi
- Sherlock Holmes: A Game of Shadows
- The Borgias
- Priest
- Fast Five
- Battle Los Angeles
- Piranha
- Kingdom of Heaven
- Inkheart
- The Golden Compass
- Underdog
- Rome
- Troy
- Harry Potter II
- Dinotopia
