= Kim Raymond =

British comic book artist and animator (born 1957)

Kim Raymond (born 1957) is a British comic book artist and animator. Best known in the UK as a contributor to the Judge Dredd series of comics in the 2000 AD series, newspaper comic strips appearing in the first UK newspaper to be printed in full colour, Today, and The Daily Star. He is also one of the first UK born artists to obtain international recognition for developing commercial Disney art originating from the UK.

== Early life ==
Kim Raymond was born in Woking, Surrey to parents Eric, an ex-navy communications engineer working in the domestic television industry and Patricia Raymond, a nurse.

His early love of comics was of home-grown UK titles such as The Beano, Tiger and Lion, and more significantly, TV(Century)21, a spin-off title accompanying the puppet TV series of Gerry Anderson.

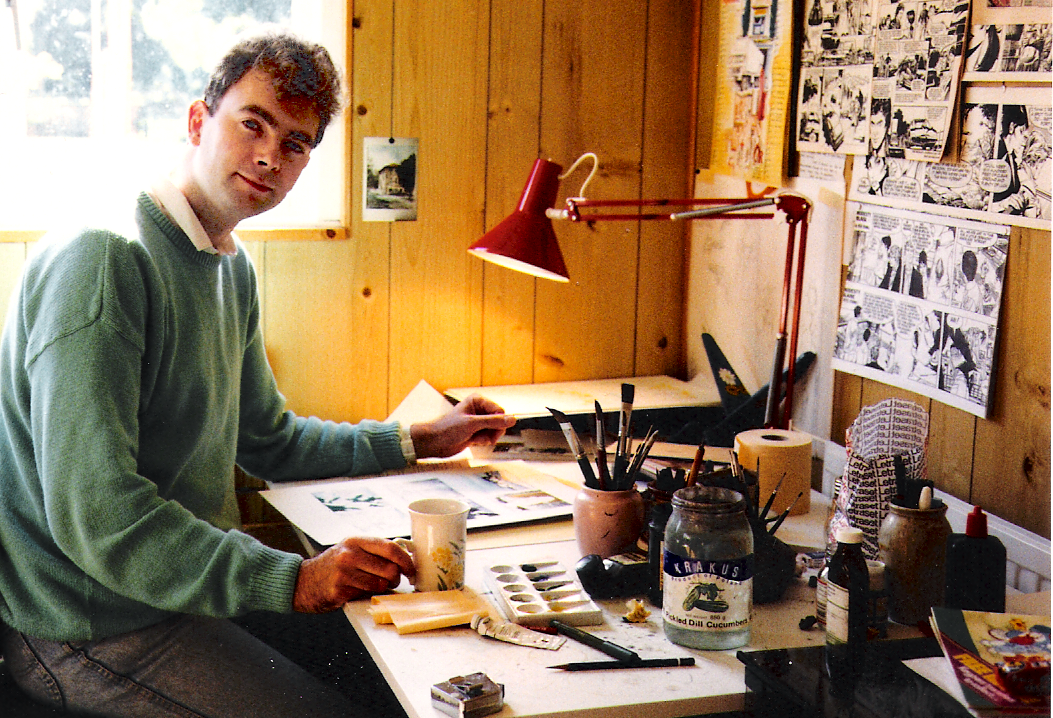
Kim Raymond at his studio in Surrey - mid 1980s

British artist Frank Bellamy contributed regularly to TV21 and later drew a daily comic strip for The Mirror newspaper, Garth. This had a major influence on the ambitions of Raymond, along with the growing availability of Marvel comics in the UK such as Spiderman, The Silver Surfer and Thor.

After three years studying animation at art college in Surrey he took his interest to The Walt Disney Company in London, and began as a junior artist in the Character Merchandising Division. But after a year decided to pursue a career in comics, approaching the agent of David Wright, illustrator of the daily newspaper strip Carol Day, through his son Patrick Wright, at the time himself illustrating Modesty Blaise for the London Evening Standard.

== UK Comics ==
Raymond started his comic career working for Dundee-based DC Thomson on girls' titles such as Mandy and Tracy. Later he progressed to boys comics for IPC London, on M.A.S.K., Robo machines, Starcom and then later Tharg's Future Shocks and Judge Dredd in black and white in the early eighties.

His ability to draw women well and with confidence eventually led him to contribute to the exploits of Judge Anderson, Psi Division, in Judge Dredd. He confesses that he was heavily influenced by Jim Holdaway, the first Modesty Blaise artist; Romero, a Spanish artist who took up the mantle on Modesty Blaise after Holdaway’s untimely death, Frank Bellamy, and Ron Smith, who twice helped him with advice and guidance in his early and later comic career. Smith was also a regular Dredd artist and a co-contributor to the City of the Damned epic on which Raymond also worked, illustrating three episodes. His final comic work appeared over several years in the two daily national newspaper strips, Checkout Girl (The Daily Star) and Roy of the Rovers (Today Newspaper).

== Disney ==
In the late eighties it became clear to Kim Raymond that the UK comics industry was becoming more ‘licensed properties’ with little room to create new characters, so he returned to the area of work that had a huge legacy for him in terms of drawing quality, the art of Walt Disney.

He worked for several years as a freelance contributor, and then in 1992 created Character Magic Ltd. in order to further develop both the quality of work that he was producing and also service the large licensee base that he was consulted to engage with by Disney. After further masterclass training in both the US and Paris, Raymond became the leading UK Disney Character artist and in 1999 he began working for The Disney Stores Europe as a consultant.

He currently holds the position of Senior Principal Artist working for the U.S. parent company at Disney in London and is responsible for many Disney art successes.
