= Batman/Judge Dredd: Judgment on Gotham =

Graphic novel by John Wagner, Alan Grant and Simon Bisley

- Judgment on Gotham, cover art by Simon Bisley.
- Date: December 1991
- Main characters: Batman; Judge Dredd; Judge Death; Scarecrow; Psi-Judge Anderson; Mean Machine Angel
- Page count: 60 pages
- Publisher: DC Comics; Fleetway Publications

Creative team
- Writers: Alan Grant; John Wagner
- Artists: Simon Bisley
- Letterers: Todd Klein
- Colourists: Simon Bisley
- Editors: Steve MacManus; Dennis O'Neil
- ISBN: 1-56389-022-4

Batman/Judge Dredd: Judgment on Gotham is the first of four Batman and Judge Dredd crossover comic books, published by DC Comics and Fleetway Publications in 1991. It was written by John Wagner and Alan Grant, with art by Simon Bisley.

== Publication history ==
Judgment on Gotham was released as a graphic novel in 1991 (ISBN 1-56389-022-4) and has been reprinted a number of times since.

In February 2026, Rebellion announced that a special Anniversary Edition would be published to celebrate the 35th anniversary of the original publication; this new edition will "be reprinted in a larger format than ever before, but will use brand new scans of the original printing film from 1992 – carefully restored by Rebellion’s experienced reprographics teams – to present Bisley’s groundbreaking fully-painted artwork in a glorious new light." The publication date is 15th July 2026. As well as the standard hardback edition, a limited run of 1,000 exclusive hardback editions was made available through the webstore - this edition featured an alternative cover design and omitted all cover text, including the title and creative credits.

- Standard Hardback: ISBN 9781837867585
- Webstore Exclusive Hardback: ISBN 9781837868377

== Synopsis ==
Judge Death makes a dimensional jump to Gotham City, murdering two lovers and a police officer. Batman defeats Death, who flees in spirit form. Among the remains of his host body, Batman finds a dimensional jump belt that he accidentally activates, transporting him to Mega-City One, where he is confronted by Mean Machine Angel. As Mean Machine attacks Batman, they are both confronted by Judge Dredd. Mean Machine flees to Gotham using the belt, then wanders into the city looking for Judge Death.

In Mega-City One, Dredd arrests Batman for possession of illegal weapons (the contents of his utility belt) and accuses him of vigilantism. Batman is frustrated at his inability to explain himself to Dredd, until telepath Judge Anderson scans Batman's mind to ensure that Death is not "hiding" in his brain, and explains Death's nature and motives to Batman. Batman insists on returning to Gotham immediately, and Dredd insists on Batman first serving a 20-year sentence for his "crimes". Batman breaks his bonds and punches Dredd to the floor, before being subdued by several other Judges. Anderson breaks Batman out of custody and drives him to a functioning dimensional gate. Dredd calls for them to be stopped and, when this fails, follows them to Gotham.

In Gotham, Batman's enemy the Scarecrow, and his henchman, Benny, break into the City Morgue to steal the raw materials for his hallucinogenic "fear-toxin". Promised a "feast of fear" in exchange, the Scarecrow becomes partners with Judge Death. After killing Benny, Death attempts to turn on the Scarecrow, who stops him with a dose of his fear toxin (exposing Death to visions of cute, fluffy bunnies and My Little Ponies) and directs him to a heavy metal concert featuring a band called Living Death. Meanwhile, Mean Machine demolishes a bar and is directed to the same concert.

As Death slaughters the heavy metal band, Batman, Anderson, and Dredd appear. In the battle that follows, Death is on the verge of killing Dredd when Batman uses a batarang to destroy his physical body while Anderson imprisons his spirit in her mind. Mean Machine, stuck in a berserk frenzy that demolishes the stage, is subdued after a pinpoint shot from Dredd destroys the mood-controlling dial on his head. The Scarecrow is likewise captured.

Dredd prepares to take Anderson and Mean Machine back to Mega-City One, and insists that Batman come along to complete his "sentence". They are close to blows when Anderson persuades Dredd to drop the charges against Batman, especially since she warns that Death must be delivered to proper containment before he successfully breaks free from her mind. As they depart, Dredd admits that Batman is a "bit of a tough guy", implying some respect.

== Character handling ==
In this version, the Scarecrow is given a ghoulish, almost phantom-like look, as compared to his contemporary appearance in DC Comics wherein his costume resembled that of a conventional scarecrow.

Alec Worley, who wrote a trilogy of novellas chronicling Cassandra Anderson's first year as a Judge, wrote in his foreword to the omnibus edition that he first became captivated by her character based on her appearance in Judgement on Gotham, noting that Bisley had chosen to draw her as "more like a musclebound Tori Amos than the chic Debbie Harry lookalike she had been under Brian Bolland".

== Reception ==
Igor Goldkind was 2000 AD's marketing consultant at the time and recalls one successful event:

I also organised more professional press conferences before major signings and national comic book signing tours, which hadn't really been done on a big scale in this country before. I remember the Judge Dredd vs. Batman graphic novel signing launch at the Virgin Megastore at Oxford Circus in London amazed even the police with the numbers that lined up around the block to get their book signed by Simon Bisley, John Wagner and Alan Grant. The store manager said it was a bigger draw than when David Bowie had done a signing the month previously.

Judgment on Gotham won a number of comics industry awards, including the 1992 UK Comic Art Award for Best Original Graphic Novel. In addition, Bisley's work on the book garnered him the Best Artist Eisner Award and UK Comic Art Award for 1992. Judgment on Gotham was also nominated for the 1992 Eisner Award for Best Graphic Album: New, losing out to Will Eisner's To the Heart of the Storm.

== Other Batman/Judge Dredd crossovers ==
This was the first of four joint adventures, all by the same writers – the other three were:

- Batman/Judge Dredd: Vendetta in Gotham (1993), art by Cam Kennedy
- Batman/Judge Dredd: The Ultimate Riddle (1995), art by Carl Critchlow and Dermot Power
- Batman/Judge Dredd: Die Laughing #1-2 (1998), art by Glenn Fabry and Jim Murray
