= Judge Anderson =

Fictional comics character

- Judge Anderson in "The Jesus Syndrome" (art by Arthur Ranson)

Publication information
- Publisher: IPC Media/Rebellion Developments
- First appearance: 2000 AD #150 (February 1980)
- Created by: John Wagner; Brian Bolland

In-story information
- Full name: Cassandra Anderson

Judge Cassandra Anderson is a fictional law enforcer and psychic appearing in the British science fiction comics 2000 AD and the Judge Dredd Megazine. Created by writer John Wagner and artist Brian Bolland, Anderson made her debut as a supporting character in the Judge Dredd story "Judge Death" (2000 AD #150, February 1980). The character's popularity with readers led to her starring in her own series, Anderson: Psi-Division, which (since 1988) has been written almost exclusively by Alan Grant, often working with artist Arthur Ranson until 2005; Boo Cook drew a majority of the stories until 2012, since which a number of different artists have worked on the strip. In 2012, the character appeared in the film Dredd, played by Olivia Thirlby.

== Publication history ==
John Wagner created both Judge Death and Judge Anderson for the Judge Dredd story "Judge Death", the latter helping introduce the Psi-Judges, which were seen as a natural progression. A popular misconception is that artist Brian Bolland based the character on Debbie Harry, due to the mistaken belief that he had recently drawn the singer into an advertisement for the Forbidden Planet 2 store in London. 2000 AD's former editor Kelvin Gosnell has recounted that the comic's assistant editor Deirdre Vine at the time was the inspiration for the character, having been surreptitiously photographed across the office and the snap then given to Bolland who was told to, "Make Anderson look like that."

Shortly afterwards, Alan Grant began to co-write Judge Dredd with Wagner. When Anderson got her own series, Wagner and Grant also co-authored those stories. This collaboration lasted until 1988, when their differences of opinion about how to develop Dredd's character came to a head while planning the last episode of the Judge Dredd story "Oz". After that, Grant wrote Anderson's stories on his own, while Wagner wrote Dredd's.

Grant later said: "A lot of Anderson counts among what I think of as my best work. The fact that I've had one of the best storytellers in the business, Arthur Ranson, along for most of the ride makes it even more memorable for me."

== Fictional character biography ==
Like the mythical Cassandra (the sister of Paris of Troy), Judge Anderson (b. 2080) has psychic powers, chiefly telepathy and precognition. These abilities made her a member of Mega-City One's 'Psi Division' of Judges.

The character debuts during the first attack by Judge Death of the Dark Judges (a group of nihilistic undead Judges). During this encounter, Anderson is possessed by Judge Death but then thwarts him by having herself entombed in "Boing", a tough but porous material. This lasts until the Dark Judges free her to release Judge Death, whereafter Anderson returns to active duty. She is instrumental in stopping this first attack by the Dark Judges, as well as several others. Due to being possessed and manipulated by them, Anderson develops a personal hatred of the Dark Judges.

Anderson is prominent in her Division and gains Dredd's respect. Unlike Dredd, she is a critic of the weaknesses in the judicial system of Mega-City One, has a sense of humour, forms personal friendships with fellow Judges, and permits herself doubt and remorse. However, she is still capable and willing like any Judge of using extreme or lethal force against anyone, men, women or children when necessary. Because her determination is similar to Dredd's, the two of them co-operate effectively on several missions.

In the story "Engram", Anderson regains memories of an abusive father and is shocked to learn that her Division was responsible for blocking them from her mind in the first place. This, together with the events of "Leviathan's Farewell" (concerning the suicide of her friend Judge Corey), "Shamballa", "The Jesus Syndrome" and "Childhood's End", prompts Anderson to resign from the judicial system. After several adventures in outer space, she returns to Mega-City One. Dredd and Anderson are both considered veterans and regarded with awe by less experienced judges.

Later, after a deadly run-in with Judge Death, Anderson falls into a coma and is infected with the psychic Half-Life virus. A team of Psi-Judges succeeded in rescuing Anderson, but the Half-Life passes to Judge Gistane, who is then tortured by the mad Judge Fauster. When Half-Life is unleashed on the city, causing a wave of mass murder, Anderson stops it. Since she awoke from her coma, Anderson is now 60 (as of 2018). Being a Psi prevents her from using drugs and treatments Street Judges use to stay active despite aging. Because of this, Anderson expects to age beyond usefulness.

== Alternative comic versions ==
- In 1994 DC Comics began publishing the short-lived title Judge Dredd – Legends of the Law, which featured their own version of Dredd. Issues 1–4 featured Anderson as a cadet in a story called "The Organ Donors" (1994–1995), written by John Wagner and Alan Grant and illustrated by Brent Anderson and Jimmy Palmiotti. (Note that the Anderson in the Judge Dredd and Batman crossover stories is the original 2000 AD version of the character.)
- In 2012 issue #2 of IDW Publishing's new Judge Dredd title included Anderson. IDW gave Anderson her own comic in 2014. That lasted for four issues.
- In 2016 the Judge Dredd Megazine published stories based on the version of Anderson which had appeared in the 2012 film Dredd, in issues 377 to 379. "The Deep End" was written by Alec Worley, with art by Paul Davidson. "Judgement Call" was written by Worley, with art by Lee Carter.

== Bibliography ==
The following stories feature Judge Anderson and were printed in 2000 AD and the Judge Dredd Megazine.

=== Anderson as a main character ===
- Judge Dredd:
  - "Judge Death", written by John Wagner, art by Brian Bolland, in 2000 AD #149–151 (1980)
  - "Judge Death Lives", written by John Wagner and Alan Grant, art by Brian Bolland, in 2000 AD #224–228 (1981)
- Judge Anderson:
  - "The Haunting", written by Alan Grant, art by Kim Raymond, 2000 AD Annual 1984 (1983)
- Judge Dredd:
  - "City of the Damned", written by John Wagner and Alan Grant, art by Steve Dillon (episodes 1, 5–7, 12–13), Ron Smith (2–3, 10, 14), Kim Raymond (4, 11) and Ian Gibson (8–9), in 2000 AD #393–406 (1984)
- Judge Anderson:
  - "The Mind of Edward Bottlebum", written by John Wagner and Alan Grant, art by Ian Gibson, Judge Dredd Annual 1985 (1984)
- Anderson: Psi Division
  - "Revenge" (also known in reprints as "Four Dark Judges"), written by Alan Grant and John Wagner, art by Brett Ewins (episodes 1–7), Cliff Robinson (8–10, 12) and Robin Smith (11), in 2000 AD #416–427 (1985)
  - "A Fistful of Denimite", written by Alan Grant, art by Ian Gibson, in Judge Dredd Annual 1986 (1985)
  - "The Possessed", written by Alan Grant (as R. Clark), art by Brett Ewins, in 2000 AD #468–478 (1986)
  - "Golem", written by Alan Grant, art by Enric Romero, in 2000 AD Annual 1987 (1986)
  - "Hour of the Wolf", written by Alan Grant, art by Barry Kitson and Will Simpson, in 2000 AD #520–531 (1987)
  - "Dear Diary", illustrated text story by Peter Milligan, art by Eddy Cant, in 2000 AD Annual 1988 (1987)
  - "A Soldier's Tale", written by Alan Grant, art by Mike Collins, in Judge Dredd Annual 1988 (1987)
- Judge Dredd:
  - "The Undercity", written by John Wagner and Alan Grant, art by Ian Gibson, in the Daily Star 5 May 1988 – 3 August 1988
- Judge Corey:
  - "Leviathan's Farewell", written by Alan Grant, art by Mick Austin, in 2000 AD Sci–Fi Special 1988 (1988)
- Anderson: Psi Division:
  - "Colin Wilson Block", written by Alan Grant, art by Ian Gibson, in 2000 AD Winter Special 1988 (1988)
- Judge Dredd:
  - "The Monster Maker", written by John Wagner and Alan Grant, art by Mike Collins, in the Daily Star 31 October 1988 – 30 January 1989
- Anderson: Psi Division:
  - "Contact", written by Alan Grant, art by Mark Farmer, in 2000 AD #607–609 (1988–1989)
  - "Beyond the Void", written by Alan Grant, art by Mick Austin, in 2000 AD #612–613 (1989)
  - "Helios", written by Alan Grant, art by David Roach, in 2000 AD #614–622 (1989)
  - "Triad", written by Alan Grant, art by Arthur Ranson, in 2000 AD #635–644 (1989)
  - "The Prophet", written by Alan Grant, art by David Roach, in 2000 AD #645–647 (1989)
  - "The Random Man", written by Alan Grant, art by Carlos Ezquerra, in 2000 AD #657–659 (1989)
  - "Confessions of a She–Devil", written by Alan Grant, art by Mick Austin, in 2000 AD Annual 1990 (1989)
  - "The Screaming Skull", written by Alan Grant, art by David Roach, in 2000 AD #669–670 (1990)
  - "Shamballa", written by Alan Grant, art by Arthur Ranson, in 2000 AD #700–711 (1990) (set before "Judge Dredd: Necropolis" in #674–699)
  - "Exorcise Duty", illustrated text story by Andy Lanning/Dan Abnett, art by Anthony Williams (pencils) and Andy Lanning (inks), in Judge Dredd Annual 1991 (1990)
  - "Engram", written by Alan Grant, art and co–plotting by David Roach, in 2000 AD #712–717 and #758–763 (1991)
- Batman / Judge Dredd:
  - Judgement on Gotham, written by John Wagner and Alan Grant, art by Simon Bisley, graphic novel (ISBN 1-56389-022-4) (1991)
- Anderson: Psi Division:
  - "The Most Dangerous Game", illustrated text story by Mark Millar, art by Dermot Power, in Judge Dredd Yearbook 1992 (1991)
  - "Blythe Spirit", written by Alan Grant, art by David Roach, in the Judge Dredd Megazine (volume 2) #8 (1992)
  - "Reasons to Be Cheerful", written by Alan Grant, art by Arthur Ranson (episode 1) and Siku (2), in Judge Dredd Megazine (vol. 2) #10–11 (1992)
  - "The Witch? Report", written by Alan Grant, art by Arthur Ranson, in Judge Dredd Megazine (vol. 2) #14 (1992)
  - "Baby Talk", written by Alan Grant and Tony Luke, art by Russel Fox, in Judge Dredd Mega Special #5 (1992)
  - "George", written by Alan Grant, art by Russell Fox, in Judge Dredd Yearbook 1993 (1992)
  - "The Jesus Syndrome", written by Alan Grant, art by Arthur Ranson, in Judge Dredd Megazine (vol. 2) #22–24 (1993)
  - "Childhood's End", written by Alan Grant, art by Kev Walker, in Judge Dredd Megazine (vol. 2) #27–34 (1993)
- Anderson: Psi:
  - "Voyage of the Seeker", written by Alan Grant, art by Mark Wilkinson, on back of poster, free gift with Judge Dredd Megazine (vol. 2) #37 (1993)
  - "Postcards from the Edge", written by Alan Grant, art by Steve Sampson (episodes 1, 10–11), Tony Luke (2, 8), Charles Gillespie (3, 9), Arthur Ranson (4), Xuasus (5–7), in Judge Dredd Megazine (vol. 2) #50–60 (1994)
  - "Postcard to Myself", written by Alan Grant, art by Steve Sampson, in Judge Dredd Megazine (vol. 2) #73 (1995)
- Anderson: Psi Division:
  - "Something Wicked", written by Alan Grant, art by Steve Sampson (episodes 1–3) and Charles Gillespie (4–7), in Judge Dredd Megazine (vol. 2) #74–80 (1995)
  - "Satan", written by Alan Grant, art by Arthur Ranson, in Judge Dredd Megazine (vol. 3) #1–7 (1995)
  - "The Protest", written by Alan Grant, art by Arthur Ranson, in Judge Dredd Megazine (vol. 3) #14 (1996)
  - "Wonderwall", written by Alan Grant, art by Steve Sampson, in 2000 AD #1045–1049 (1997)
  - "Crusade", written by Alan Grant, art by Steve Sampson, in 2000 AD #1050–1061 (1997)
  - "Danse Macabre", written by Alan Grant, art by Angel Unzueta, in 2000 AD #1076 (1998)
  - "Witch", written by Alan Grant, art by Steve Sampson, in 2000 AD #1087–1089 (1998)
  - "The Great Debate", written by Alan Grant, art by Steve Sampson, in 2000 AD #1090 (1998)
  - "Lawless", written by Alan Grant, art by Trevor Hairsine, in 2000 AD #1102–1103 (1998)
- Batman / Judge Dredd:
  - Die Laughing, written by John Wagner and Alan Grant, art by Glenn Fabry (issue #1) and Jim Murray (issue #2), two-part miniseries (1998)
- Anderson: Psi Division:
  - "Horror Story", written by Alan Grant, art by Steve Sampson, in 2000 AD #1132–1137 (1999)
  - "Semper Vi", written by Alan Grant, art by Steve Sampson, in 2000 AD #1140 (1999)
  - "R*Evolution", written by Alan Grant, art by Arthur Ranson, in 2000 AD #1263–1272 (2001)
- Judge Death:
  - "My Name is Death", written by John Wagner, art by Frazer Irving, in 2000 AD #1289–1294 (2002)
- Anderson: Psi Division:
  - "Half–Life", written by Alan Grant and Tony Luke, art by Arthur Ranson, in Judge Dredd Megazine #214–217 (2003)
  - "WMD", written by Alan Grant, art by Arthur Ranson, in Judge Dredd Megazine #221–226 (2004)
  - "Lock–in", written by Alan Grant, art by Arthur Ranson, in Judge Dredd Megazine #227–230 (2005)
  - "City of the Dead", written by Alan Grant, art by Arthur Ranson, in Judge Dredd Megazine #231–236 (2005)
  - "Lucid", written by Alan Grant, art by Arthur Ranson, in Judge Dredd Megazine #238–241 (2005)
  - "Big Robots", written by Alan Grant, art by Dave Taylor, in Judge Dredd Megazine #257–264 (2007)
  - "Wiierd", written by Alan Grant, art by Boo Cook, in Judge Dredd Megazine #272–276 (2008)
  - "Biophyle", written by Alan Grant, art by Boo Cook, in Judge Dredd Megazine #277–278 (2008)
  - "House of Vyle", written by Alan Grant, art by Boo Cook, in Judge Dredd Megazine #300–304 (2010)
- Cadet Anderson: Psi Division:
  - "Big Girls Don't Cry", written by Alan Grant, art by Patrick Goddard, in 2000 AD #2011 (2010)
  - "Teenage Kyx", written by Alan Grant, art by Carlos Ezquerra, in 2000 AD #1734–1739 (2011)
- Anderson: Psi Division:
  - "The Trip", written by Alan Grant, art by Boo Cook, in Judge Dredd Megazine #309–313 (2011)
- What If..?
  - "...Cassandra Anderson Hadn't Become a Judge?" written by Alan Grant, art by Robin Smith, in 2000 AD #1773 (2012)
- Cadet Anderson: Psi Division:
  - "Algol", written by Alan Grant, art by Steve Yeowell, in 2000 AD #1780–1785 (2012)
- Anderson: Psi Division:
  - "Stone Voices", written by Alan Grant, art by Boo Cook, in Judge Dredd Megazine #327–331 (2012)
  - "The Hades Trip", text story by George Pickett, in Judge Dredd Megazine #330 (2012)
- Judge Dredd:
  - "The Pits", written by Alan Grant, art by Jon Davis-Hunt, in Judge Dredd Megazine #332 (2013)
- Cadet Anderson: Psi Division
  - "One in Ten", written by Alan Grant, art by Carlos Ezquerra, in 2000 AD #1833–1839 (2013)
- Anderson: Psi Division
  - "Dead End", written by Alan Grant, art by Michael Dowling, in Judge Dredd Megazine #343–349 (2013–2014)
    - Sequel to "Algol" and "One in Ten."
  - "Horror Comes to Velma Dinkley", written by Alan Grant, art by Darren Douglas, in 2000 AD Winter Special 2014
- Judge Dredd
  - "Dark Justice", written by John Wagner, art by Greg Staples, in 2000 AD Prog 2015 and #1912–1921 (2014–2015)
- Anderson: Psi Division
  - "Mutineers", written by Emma Beeby, art by Andrew Currie, in Judge Dredd Megazine #359–360 (2015)
  - "Too Much Information", text story by Alec Worley, in Judge Dredd Megazine #361 (2015)
  - "Tower of Skin", text story by Andrew Hawnt, in Judge Dredd Megazine #373 (2016)
  - "The Candidate", written by Emma Beeby, art by Nick Dyer and Ben Willsher, in 2000 AD #1993–1999 (2016)
  - "A Dream of Death", written by Alan Grant, art by David Roach, in 2000 AD #2000 (2016)
  - "Dragon Blood", written by Alan Grant, art by Paul Marshall, in Judge Dredd Megazine #380–384 (2017)
  - "Hag Team", written by Dan Abnett, art by Dani and John Charles, in 2000 AD Free Comic Book Day prog (2017)
  - "NWO", written by Alan Grant, art by Paul Marshall, in Judge Dredd Megazine #385–390 (2017)
  - "Undertow", written by Emma Beeby, art by David Roach (episodes 1–4) and Mike Collins and Cliff Robinson (from episode 5) and Jose Villarrubia (colours on all episodes), in 2000 AD #2073–2080 (2018)
  - "SPA Day", written by Maura McHugh, art by Emma Vieceli & Barbara Nosenzo, in 2000 AD Sci-Fi Special 2018
  - "Jordan Ramzy's Kitchen Nightmare", written by Alan Grant, art by Inaki Miranda and Eva de la Cruz, in Judge Dredd Megazine #400 (2018)
  - "Death's Dark Angels", written by Alan Grant, art by Jake Lynch, in 2000 AD #2100 (2018)
  - "Spellcraft", written by Alec Worley, art by P.J. Holden and Gary Caldwell, in 2000 AD #2130 (2019)
  - "Martyrs", written by Emma Beeby, art by Aneke and Barbara Nosenzo, in 2000 AD #2137–2144 (2019)
  - "The Dead Run", written by Maura McHugh, art by Patrick Goddard and Pippa Mather, in Judge Dredd Megazine #410–414 (2019)
  - "Judge Death: The Movie", written by Alan Grant, art by Jake Lynch and Jim Boswell, in 2000 AD #2150 (2019)
  - "First-Class Citizen", written by Cavan Scott, art by Paul Davidson and Len O'Grady, in 2000 AD #2183 (2020)
  - "No Country for Old Psis", written by Maura McHugh, art by Steven Austen and Barbara Nosenzo, in Judge Dredd Megazine #424 (2020)
  - "Early Warning", written by Cavan Scott, art by Paul Davidson and Len O'Grady, in 2000 AD #2206 (2020)
  - "Deep Burn", written by Cavan Scott, art by Paul Davidson and Matt Soffe, in 2000 AD #2233 (2021)
  - "All Will Be Judged", written by Maura McHugh, art by Anna Morozova and Pippa Bowland, in 2000 AD Sci-Fi Special 2021
  - "Be Psi-ing You", written by Maura McHugh, art by Lee Carter, in 2000 AD #2250 (2021)
    - This story was originally printed with incomplete artwork, and was reprinted with the completed art in the supplement to the Judge Dredd Megazine #445 (2022).
  - "Dissolution", written by Maura McHugh, art by Lee Carter, in Judge Dredd Megazine #445–447 (2022)
  - "Half of a Heaven", written by Paul Cornell, art by Emma Vieceli and Barbara Nosenzo, in 2000 AD Sci-Fi Special 2022
  - "Allied Forces", written by Honor Vincent, art by Boo Cook, in Judge Dredd Megazine #448 (2022)
  - "The Wolf & The Dragon", written by Alec Worley, art by Patrick Goddard and Jim Boswell, in Judge Dredd Megazine #460 (2023)
  - "The Game Within", written by Torunn Gronbekk, art by Kieran McKeown and Pippa Bowland, in 2000 AD #2362 (2023)
  - "The Seer", written by Alex de Campi, art by Silvia Califano & Matt Soffe, in Best of 2000 AD Free Comic Book Day issue (2025)
  - "Flowers of Evil", written by Alex de Campi, art by Rob Richardson, first episode in 2000 AD #2450, second episode in Judge Dredd Megazine #484 (2025)
  - "Hell Night at the Cine-Pit", written by Alec Worley, art by Ben Willsher, in Judge Dredd Megazine #485-488 (2025–26)
  - "The Parade of Death", written by Maura McHugh, art by Joe Currie, in 2000 AD Annual 2026 (2025)
  - "The Void", written by Liam Johnson, art by Rob Richardson, in 2000 AD #2488–2493 (2026)
  - "Egregore", written by Liam Johnson, art by Simon Fraser & Gary Caldwell, in 2000 AD #2506 (2026)

=== Anderson as a supporting character ===
- Judge Dredd:
  - "The Apocalypse War", written by John Wagner and Alan Grant, art by Carlos Ezquerra, in 2000 AD #245–270 (1982)
  - "The Graveyard Shift," written by John Wagner and Alan Grant, art by Ron Smith, in 2000 AD #335–341 (1983)
  - "Silence Isn't Golden," written by John Wagner, art by Ron Smith, in the Daily Star 17 August 1985
  - "Tomb of the Judges," written by John Wagner and Alan Grant, art by Ian Gibson, in 2000 AD #496–498 (1986)
  - "Bride of Death," written by John Wagner and Alan Grant, art by Ian Gibson, Daily Star 1 January – 19 March 1987
  - "A Guide to Mega-City Law," written by John Wagner and Alan Grant, art by Ian Gibson, Daily Star 19 June – 12 September 1987 (18–22 August only)
  - "A Total Near Death Experience," written by Alan Grant, art by Barry Kitson, in 2000 AD #629–630 (1989)
  - "And the Wind Cried," written by Alan Grant, art by Mike Collins and Peter Ventner, in 2000 AD #637 (1989)
  - "Necropolis", written by John Wagner, art by Carlos Ezquerra, in 2000 AD #674–699 (1990)
  - "Nightmares," written by John Wagner, art by Steve Dillon, in 2000 AD #702–706 (1990)
  - “Death Aid,” written by Garth Ennis, art by Carlos Ezquerra, in 2000 AD #711–720 (1990–1991)
  - "Cult of the Thugee," written by Alan Grant, art by Glyn Dillon, in Judge Dredd Mega-Special #4 (1991)
  - "Return of the Assassin," written by John Wagner, art by Cam Kennedy, in 2000 AD #1141–1147 (1999)
  - "The Trial," written by John Wagner, art by Simon Davis, in 2000 AD #1148–1150 (1999)
  - "Trial of Strength," written by John Wagner, art by Neil Googe and Stephen Baskerville (inks 2), in 2000 AD #1151–1152 (1999)
  - "War Games," written by John Wagner, art by Neil Googe (episode 1), Mike McMahon (2) and Charlie Adlard (3), Andy Clarke (pencils 4–5), Stephen Baskerville (inks 4–5), Colin Wilson (6–7), in 2000 AD #1153–1159 (1999)
  - "Endgame," written by John Wagner, art by Charlie Adlard, in 2000 AD #1160–1164 (1999)
  - "Placebo," written by Rufus Dog, art by John McCrea, in free supplements to 2000 AD #1405 and Judge Dredd Megazine #224 (2004)
  - "Judgement," written by Gordon Rennie, art by Ian Gibson, in 2000 AD #1523–1528 (2007)
- Tharg the Mighty: "A Night 2 Remember," relevant page written by Andy Diggle, art by Jock, in 2000 AD #1280 (2002)
- Judge Dredd:
  - "Serial Serial," written by John Wagner, art by Colin MacNeil, in 2000 AD #1950–1954 (2015) (third episode only)
  - "End of Days", written by Rob Williams, art by Colin MacNeil, Henry Flint and Chris Blythe, in 2000 AD #2184–2199 (2020)
  - "Apotheosis," written by Mike Carroll and Maura McHugh, art by James Newell and Jim Boswell, in 2000 AD Sci-Fi Special 2021
  - "Fear City," written by Karl Stock, art by Dan McDaid & Jack Davies, in Judge Dredd Megazine #491 (2026)

== Collected editions ==
The Judge Anderson, Anderson: Psi Division and Anderson: Psi stories (and also Judge Corey) are being collected in order of their original publication in a series of trade paperbacks:

- Judge Anderson: The Psi Files Volume 1, Rebellion Developments, 2009, ISBN 978-1-906735-22-7
  - "Revenge" (also known as "Four Dark Judges"), written by Alan Grant, art by Brett Ewins (episodes 1–7), Cliff Robinson (8–10, 12) and Robin Smith (11), in 2000 AD #416–427 (1985)
  - "The Possessed", written by Alan Grant (as R. Clark), art by Brett Ewins, in 2000 AD #468–478 (1986)
  - "Hour of the Wolf", written by Alan Grant, art by Barry Kitson and Will Simpson, in 2000 AD #520–531 (1987)
  - "Contact", written by Alan Grant, art by Mark Farmer, in 2000 AD #607–609 (1988–1989)
  - "Beyond the Void", written by Alan Grant, art by Mick Austin, in 2000 AD #612–613 (1989)
  - "Helios", written by Alan Grant, art by David Roach, in 2000 AD #614–622 (1989)
  - Judge Corey: "Leviathan's Farewell", written by Alan Grant, art by Mick Austin, in 2000 AD Sci–Fi Special 1988 (1988)
  - "Triad", written by Alan Grant, art by Arthur Ranson, in 2000 AD #635–644 (1989)
  - "The Prophet", written by Alan Grant, art by David Roach, in 2000 AD #645–647 (1989)
  - "The Random Man", written by Alan Grant, art by Carlos Ezquerra, in 2000 AD #657–659 (1989)
  - "The Screaming Skull", written by Alan Grant, art by David Roach, in 2000 AD #669–670 (1990)
  - "Engram", written by Alan Grant, art and co–plotting by David Roach, in 2000 AD #712–717 and #758–763 (1991)
  - "The Haunting", written by Alan Grant, art by Kim Raymond, 2000 AD Annual 1984 (1983)
- Judge Anderson: The Psi Files Volume 2, Rebellion Developments, 2012, ISBN 978-1-907992-95-7
  - "Shamballa", written by Alan Grant, art by Arthur Ranson, in 200AD #700-711 (1991)
  - "Blythe Spirit", written by Alan Grant, art by David Roach, in Judge Dredd Megazine 2.08 (1992)
  - "Reasons to Be Cheerful", written by Alan Grant, art by Arthur Ranson and Siku, in Judge Dredd Megazine 2.10 - 2.11 (1992)
  - "The Witch? Report", written by Alan Grant, art by Arthur Ranson, in Judge Dredd Megazine 2.14 (1992)
  - "The Jesus Syndrome", written by Alan Grant, art by Arthur Ranson, in Judge Dredd Megazine 2.22 - 2.24 (1993)
  - "Childhood's End", written by Alan Grant, art by Kevin Walker, in Judge Dredd Megazine 2.27 - 2.34 (1993-4)
  - "Voyage of the Seeker", written by Alan Grant, art by Mark Wilkinson, on back of poster, free gift with Judge Dredd Megazine 2.37 (1993)
  - "Postcards from the Edge", written by Alan Grant, art by Steve Sampson (episodes 1, 10–11), Tony Luke (2, 8), Charles Gillespie (3, 9), Arthur Ranson (4), Xuasus (5–7), in Judge Dredd Megazine 2.50–2.60 (1994)
  - "Postcard to Myself", written by Alan Grant, art by Steve Sampson, in Judge Dredd Megazine 2.73 (1995)
  - "The Mind of Edward Bottlebum", written by John Wagner and Alan Grant, art by Ian Gibson, Judge Dredd Annual 1985 (1984)
  - "A Fistful of Denimite", written by Alan Grant, art by Ian Gibson, in Judge Dredd Annual 1986 (1985)
  - "Golem", written by Alan Grant, art by Enric Romero, in 2000 AD Annual 1987 (1986)
  - "A Soldier's Tale", written by Alan Grant, art by Mike Collins, in Judge Dredd Annual 1988 (1987)
- Judge Anderson: The Psi Files Volume 3, Rebellion Developments, 2013, ISBN 978-1-78108-106-8
  - "Something Wicked", written by Alan Grant, art by Steve Sampson (episodes 1–3) and Charles Gillespie (4–7), in Judge Dredd Megazine 2.74–2.80 (1995)
  - "Satan", written by Alan Grant, art by Arthur Ranson, in Judge Dredd Megazine 3.1–3.7 (1995)
  - "The Protest", written by Alan Grant, art by Arthur Ranson, in Judge Dredd Megazine 3.14 (1996)
  - "Wonderwall", written by Alan Grant, art by Steve Sampson, in 2000 AD #1045–1049 (1997)
  - "Crusade", written by Alan Grant, art by Steve Sampson, in 2000 AD #1050–1061 (1997)
  - "Danse Macabre", written by Alan Grant, art by Angel Unzueta, in 2000 AD #1076 (1998)
  - "Witch", written by Alan Grant, art by Steve Sampson, in 2000 AD #1087–1089 (1998)
  - "The Great Debate", written by Alan Grant, art by Steve Sampson, in 2000 AD #1090 (1998)
  - "Lawless", written by Alan Grant, art by Trevor Hairsine, in 2000 AD #1102–1103 (1998)
  - "Dear Diary", illustrated text story by Peter Milligan, art by Eddy Cant, in 2000 AD Annual 1988 (1987)
  - "Colin Wilson Block", written by Alan Grant, art by Ian Gibson, in 2000 AD Winter Special 1988 (1988)
  - "Confessions of a She–Devil", written by Alan Grant, art by Mick Austin, in 2000 AD Annual 1990 (1989)
  - "Exorcise Duty", illustrated text story by Andy Lanning/Dan Abnett, art by Anthony Williams (pencils) and Andy Lanning (inks), in Judge Dredd Annual 1991 (1990)
- Judge Anderson: The Psi Files Volume 4, Rebellion Developments, 2014, ISBN 978-1-78108-236-2
  - "Horror Story", written by Alan Grant, art by Steve Sampson, in 2000 AD #1132–1137 (1999)
  - "Semper Vi", written by Alan Grant, art by Steve Sampson, in 2000 AD #1140 (1999)
  - "R*Evolution", written by Alan Grant, art by Arthur Ranson, in 2000 AD #1263–1272 (2001)
  - "Half–Life", written by Alan Grant and Tony Luke, art by Arthur Ranson, in Judge Dredd Megazine #214–217 (2003)
  - "WMD", written by Alan Grant, art by Arthur Ranson, in Judge Dredd Megazine #221–226 (2004)
  - "Lock–in", written by Alan Grant, art by Arthur Ranson, in Judge Dredd Megazine #227–230 (2005)
  - "City of the Dead", written by Alan Grant, art by Arthur Ranson, in Judge Dredd Megazine #231–236 (2005)
  - "The Most Dangerous Game", illustrated text story by Mark Millar, art by Dermot Power, in Judge Dredd Yearbook 1992 (1991)
  - "Baby Talk", written by Alan Grant and Tony Luke, art by Russel Fox, in Judge Dredd Mega Special 1992 (1992)
  - "George", written by Alan Grant, art by Russell Fox, in Judge Dredd Yearbook 1993 (1992)
- Judge Anderson: The Psi Files Volume 5, Rebellion Developments, 2016, ISBN 978-1-78108-446-5
  - "Lucid", written by Alan Grant, art by Arthur Ranson, in Judge Dredd Megazine #238–241 (2005)
  - "Big Robots", written by Alan Grant, art by Dave Taylor, in Judge Dredd Megazine #257–264 (2007)
  - "Wiierd", written by Alan Grant, art by Boo Cook, in Judge Dredd Megazine #272–276 (2008)
  - "Biophyle", written by Alan Grant, art by Boo Cook, in Judge Dredd Megazine #277–278 (2008)
  - "House of Vyle", written by Alan Grant, art by Boo Cook, in Judge Dredd Megazine #300–304 (2010)
  - "The Trip", written by Alan Grant, art by Boo Cook, in Judge Dredd Megazine #309–313 (2011)
  - "Stone Voices", written by Alan Grant, art by Boo Cook, in Judge Dredd Megazine #327–331 (2012)
  - "What If … Cassandra Anderson Hadn't Become a Judge?" written by Alan Grant, art by Robin Smith, in 2000 AD #1773 (2012)
  - "Horror Comes to Velma Dinkley", written by Alan Grant, art by Darren Douglas, in 2000 AD Winter Special 2014

The Judge Dredd stories are being collected, in order, in the series Judge Dredd: The Complete Case Files.

The Judge Death story "My Name Is Death" was reprinted in a graphic novel of the same title by Rebellion in 2005, ISBN 1-904265-73-1.

The Cadet Anderson stories were reprinted in volume 88 of Judge Dredd: The Mega Collection in May 2018 (a total of seven volumes of that collection collect Anderson stories).

== In other media ==
=== Novels ===
Mitchel Scanlon has written three Judge Anderson novels that have been published by Black Flame:

- Fear the Darkness (February 2006)
- Red Shadows (May 2006)
- Sins of the Father (February 2007)

Anderson also appears as a supporting character in Judge Dredd novels:

- Dread Dominion by Stephen Marley (May 1994)
- Dredd Vs Death by Gordon Rennie (October 2003)

Alec Worley has written three novellas published by Abaddon Books, featuring Anderson in her rookie year as a Judge, collected in the omnibus edition Judge Anderson: Year One, ISBN 978-1781085554 (June 2017):

- Heartbreaker (October 2014)
- The Abyss (December 2015)
- A Dream of the Nevertime (June 2017)

Three more novellas by different authors were published separately, and later published together in the omnibus Judge Anderson: Year Two in 2019:

- Bigger Than Biggs by Danie Ware (December 2018)
- Devourer by Laurel Sills (March 2019)
- Flytrap by Zina Hutton (August 2019)

In 2025 Anna Smith Spark wrote Anderson Versus Death, set in the third year of Anderson's career.

=== Radio ===
- Judge Dredd: Crime Chronicles - Double Zero (January 2010) written by James Swallow and produced by Big Finish Productions; Anderson was voiced by Louise Jameson.

=== Film ===
Olivia Thirlby portrays Anderson in the 2012 film Dredd, as a Cadet Judge assigned to Dredd for her final assessment. She has attempted to take the Judge aptitude test since she was nine, but her latest attempt to become a Judge saw her fail to pass by 3%, although her powers are such a significant potential asset that the board feels that it is worth testing her in the field to be evaluated directly.

=== Computer game ===
Anderson appeared as a playable character in the Dredd Vs Death videogame in 2003.

== Awards ==
- 1983: Won "Character Most Worthy of Own Title" Eagle Award
- 1986: Nominated for "Favourite Supporting Character" Eagle Award

== See also ==
- Orlok the Assassin
- History of Mega-City One
