= Judgement Day (Judge Dredd: The Role-Playing Game) =

Role-playing game adventure

Cover art by Brett Ewins, 1988

Judgement Day is a 1986 role-playing game adventure, the first one published by Games Workshop for Judge Dredd: The Role-Playing Game, which itself is based on the comic Judge Dredd.

== Plot summary ==
Judgement Day is an adventure set in the then-future of 2018 that is set both in Mega-City One and on the prison moon Titan that orbits Jupiter. The evil Judge Cal, former tyrant ruler of Mega-City One, had his personality saved on a microchip before his death. The players must find the microchip and prevent it from being used, which would lead to the return of Judge Cal and his nefarious plans.

The adventure is divided into four chapters:

1. A Shot in the Dark: The players discover the body of a med-judge in the Labyrinth district
2. The Killer Fleas: The players try to visit the household of the dead med-judge, now quarantined due to an infestation of killer insects.
3. Trouble on Titan: The players travel to the prison moon of Titan
4. Cal Has Risen: The players try to protect Chief Justice McGruder from Cal.

== Publication history ==
Games Workshop (GW) first published Judge Dredd: The Role-Playing Game in 1985. The following year, GW released the game's first adventure, Judgement Day. The 32-page book was written by Marcus L. Rowland, with a cover by Brett Ewins. It also included 16 pages of player aids and cardstock miniatures of non-player characters.

== Reception ==
Jason Kingsley reviewed Judgement Day for White Dwarf #75, giving it an overall rating of 9 out of 10, and stated that "Judgment Day is a solidly produced, value-for-money scenario, with well realised plot lines and individualised NPCs. Its plot is clever though slightly off-beat, but very much in keeping with the rest of Judge Dredd's world."
