= Citi-Block =

Role-playing game supplement

Citi-Block is a supplement published by Games Workshop in 1987 for the near-future dystopian science fiction role-playing game Judge Dredd: The Role-Playing Game.

== Publication history ==
Citi-Block was written by Richard Halliwell, Carl Sargent, Alan Merrett, and Graeme Davis, with art by Gordon Moore and Dave Andrews, and was published by Games Workshop in 1987 as a boxed set with a 20-page booklet and 12 color cardstock sheets (four pages of cut-out props and eight 11" x 16" floor plans.)

== Contents ==
Citi-Block contains full-color building floor plans marked in 25mm/1-inch squares, including rules for how to design typical Mega-City blocks, as well as rules for how to use the supplement with Warhammer 40,000. The floor plans include eight 11” x 17” layouts printed in full color on thin cardstock:

- two of motorways and foot corridors
- one of small offices
- one helipad/hoverbus stop
- one sky-rail station
- one entrance plaza (for an office building or residential block)
- one enclosed landscaped garden
- an empty area enclosed by walls

Also included are two 11” x 17” sheets of thicker card stock, printed with various cut-out details like desks, cars, plants, and phone booths.

== Reception ==
In Issue 35 of Challenge, John A. Theisen called the floor plans useful for anyone who was having trouble visualizing a Mega-City Block, and found they were well-structured, easy to use and well-planned.

In the July 1989 edition of Dragon (Issue #135), Ken Rolston called the floor plans "perfectly designed for role-playing displays." He liked the suggestion of "a worn, shabby future" and suggested they could be used for games outside of Judge Dredd, although their less-than-pristine look made them "less useful for far-future settings like the Star Trek game or Star Wars games, unless used for scenarios on backwater or frontier planets." He called the charts and guidelines for creating a Mega-City block in the rulebook "admirably detailed and specific, and are an essential supplement for anyone running a Judge Dredd game campaign." Rolston concluded, "As floor plans for role-playing displays, the Citi-Block pack is good-looking, utilitarian, flexible, and suitable for many near-future SFRPGs."

== Other reviews and commentary ==
- White Dwarf (Issue 95 - Nov 1987)
- Australian Realms #3
