= Block Mania (board game) =

1987 board game

- Designers: Richard Halliwell
- Illustrators: Dave Andrews, Chris Baker, Colin Dixon, and Brett Ewins
- Publishers: Games Workshop
- Publication: 1987; 38 years ago
- Players: 2
- Based on: Judge Dredd

Block Mania is a board game published by Games Workshop in 1987 and based on the Judge Dredd comics.

== Gameplay ==
Block Mania is a 2-player board game set in the Judge Dredd universe in which residents of two city blocks must cause as much damage as possible to each other before the Judges come to restore order. Weapons include spray paint, guns, flamethrowers and heavy lasers. The winner is the player whose block is the least damaged at the end of the game.

Richard Halliwell in White Dwarf #93 stated that "Eliminating as many of the neighbours as possible helps. This seemed like a totally splendid notion in its own right, so the rules were designed to be as simple and unobstructive as possible, while keeping the game going at a suitably fast pace."

== Publication history ==
Block Mania was designed by Richard Halliwell, with artwork by Dave Andrews, Chris Baker, Colin Dixon, and Brett Ewins, and published by Games Workshop in 1987. The same year, Games Workshop also released an expansion game, Mega-Mania, that allowed up to four players to play. More rules and tiles titled Block Mania: Happy Hour were published in the October 1987 edition of White Dwarf.

== Reception ==
In the December 1987 edition of Casus Belli (Issue #42), Pierre Lejoeux thought that the Block Mania rules "perfectly capture the atmosphere of the comic strip." His only negative comment was that the game could only be played by two players, and he highly recommended buying the Mega-Mania expansion, reasoning that "If a war between two blocks is already so destructive, how much more between four blocks?"
