= Mega-Mania =

Board game

Mega-Mania is a board game published by Games Workshop in 1987 as an expansion for Block Mania based on the Judge Dredd comics.

== Gameplay ==
Based on the two-player game Block Mania set in the Judge Dredd universe, Mega-Mania is an expansion that includes two additional blocks, allowing play for up to four players. In the game, residents of different city blocks must cause as much harm as possible to each other before the Judges arrive to restore order. Weapons include spray paint, guns, flamethrowers and heavy lasers. The winner is the player whose block is the least damaged at the end of the game.

Designer Richard Halliwell in White Dwarf #93 stated that "Mega-mania [...] points up the fascinating possibilities of the endgame as the players gang up against the overall leader and possible victory can change hands several times over quite a small number of turns."

== Publication history ==
Games Workshop published the two-player combat game Block Mania in 1987. This was quickly followed the same year by the expansion Mega-Mania, designed by Richard Halliwell, with artwork by Dave Andrews, Chris Baker, Colin Dixon, and Brett Ewins. A further expansion with more rules and tiles titled Block Mania: Happy Hour was published in the October 1987 edition of White Dwarf.

== Reception ==
In the December 1987 edition of Casus Belli (Issue #42), Pierre Lejoeux liked Block Mania but highly recommended the Mega-Mania expansion, reasoning that "If a war between two blocks is already so destructive, how much more between four blocks?"
