= Judge Dredd =

Fictional comic book character

- Illustration by Carlos Ezquerra

Publication information
- Publisher: Former; IPC Media (Fleetway), 1977–2000; Current; Rebellion Developments, 2000–present
- First appearance: 2000 AD no. 2 (5 March 1977) (Note: The cover date was actually the last day on which the issue was on sale, so the issue would have been published in the previous week.)
- Created by: John Wagner (writer); Carlos Ezquerra (artist); Pat Mills (editor)

In-story information
- Full name: Joseph Dredd
- Team affiliations: Mega-City One Justice Department; Luna 1 Justice Department
- Notable aliases: The Dead Man
- Abilities: Expert marksman; Expert hand-to-hand combatant; Bionic eyes grant 20/20 night vision and reduced blinking rate

Judge Joseph Dredd is a fictional character created by writer John Wagner and artist Carlos Ezquerra. He first appeared in the second issue of the British weekly anthology comic 2000 AD (1977). He is the magazine's longest-running character, and in 1990 he got his own title, the Judge Dredd Megazine. He also appears in a number of film and video game adaptations.

Judge Dredd is a law enforcement and judicial officer in the dystopian future city of Mega-City One, which covers most of the east coast of North America. He is a "street judge", empowered to summarily arrest, convict, sentence, and execute criminals. Judge Dredd stories often satirise American and British culture, with a focus on authoritarianism and police brutality.

Judge Dredd made his live-action debut in 1995 in Judge Dredd, portrayed by Sylvester Stallone. Later, he was portrayed by Karl Urban in the 2012 adaptation Dredd. In audio dramas by Big Finish Productions, Dredd is voiced by Toby Longworth.

== Publication history ==
When comics editor Pat Mills was developing 2000 AD in 1976, he brought in his former writing partner, John Wagner, to develop characters. Wagner had written a Dirty Harry-style "tough cop" story, "One-Eyed Jack", for Valiant, and suggested a character who took that concept to its logical extreme. In a 1995 interview, Wagner said: "When Pat was putting together 2000 AD, we realised from the success of "One-Eyed Jack" this was the kind of story the paper should have – a really hard, tough cop."

Mills had developed a horror strip called Judge Dread (named after the stage name of British ska and reggae artist Alexander Minto Hughes), before abandoning the idea as unsuitable for the new comic; but the name, with the spelling modified to "Dredd" at the suggestion of sub-editor Kelvin Gosnell, was adopted by Wagner. According to Mills, the name Joseph – given to Dredd in a story written by Mills which appeared in "prog" (short for programme or issue) no. 30 – refers to where he went to school, St Joseph's College, Ipswich.

The task of visualising the character was given to Carlos Ezquerra, a Spanish artist who had worked for Mills before on Battle Picture Weekly. Wagner gave Ezquerra an advertisement for the film Death Race 2000, showing the character Frankenstein (played by David Carradine) clad in black leather on a motorbike, as a suggestion of Dredd's appearance. Ezquerra added body-armour, zips, and chains, to which Wagner initially objected, commenting that the character looked like a "Spanish pirate." Wagner's initial script was rewritten by Mills and drawn up by Ezquerra. The hardware and cityscapes Ezquerra had drawn were far more futuristic than the near-future setting originally intended; in response, Mills set the story further into the future, on the advice of his art assistant Doug Church. The original launch story written by Wagner and drawn by Ezquerra was vetoed by the board of directors for being too violent. (Note: The story was eventually published in Judge Dredd Annual 1981.) A new script was needed for the first episode.

By this stage, Wagner had quit, disillusioned that a proposed buy-out of the new comic by another company, which would have given him and Mills a greater financial stake in the comic, had fallen through. Mills was reluctant to lose Judge Dredd and farmed the strip out to a variety of freelance writers, hoping to develop it further. Their scripts were given to a variety of artists as Mills tried to find a strip which would provide a good introduction to the character. This Judge Dredd would not be ready for the first issue of 2000 AD, launched in February 1977.

Judge Dredd's first appearance, in an advertisement in 2000AD #1 (26 February 1977). Art by Mike McMahon, from a story later published in #6.

The story chosen to introduce the character was submitted by freelance writer Peter Harris, (Note: A complete list of Harris's work for 2000 AD can be found at his entry on the 2000ad.org website.) and was extensively re-written by Mills, who added a new ending suggested by Kelvin Gosnell. It was drawn by newcomer Mike McMahon. The strip debuted in prog 2. Around this time Ezquerra quit and returned to work for Battle. There are conflicting sources about why. Ezquerra says it was because he was angry that another artist had drawn the first published Judge Dredd strip. Mills says he chose McMahon because Ezquerra had already left, having been offered a better deal by the editor of Battle.

Wagner soon returned to the character, starting in prog 9. His storyline, "The Robot Wars", was drawn by a rotating team of artists (including Ezquerra), and marked the point where Dredd became the most popular character in the comic, a position he has rarely relinquished. Judge Dredd has appeared in almost every issue since, (Note: Except issues #109, 155, 1100 and 1138.) most of the stories written by Wagner (in collaboration with Alan Grant between 1980 and 1988).

In 1983, Judge Dredd made his American debut with his own series from publisher Eagle Comics, titled Judge Dredd. It consisted of stories reprinted from the British comic, but since 2012 IDW Publishing has published a variety of Judge Dredd titles featuring original stories. Since 1990, Dredd has also had his own title in Britain, the Judge Dredd Megazine. With Wagner concentrating his energies on that, the Dredd strip in 2000 AD was left to younger writers, including Garth Ennis, Mark Millar, Grant Morrison, and John Smith. Their stories were less popular with fans, and sales fell. Wagner returned to writing the character full-time for 2000 AD in 1994.

Judge Dredd has also been published in a long-running comic strip (1981–1998) in the Daily Star, and briefly in Metro from January to April 2004. These were usually created by the same teams writing and drawing the main strip, and some of the Daily Star strips have been collected into two hardback volumes. Originally published in black and white, some of the Daily Star strips were subsequently coloured and published in Metal Hammer magazine in the 1990s.

Almost all (Note: Excluded from the Complete Case Files series were the stories "America" (Megazine vol. 1 #1–7), "America II" (Megazine vol. 3 #20–25), and "Beyond Our Kenny" (vol. 1 #1–3). They are collected in two other trade paperbacks under the titles Judge Dredd: America and Judge Dredd: The Art of Kenny Who?) of the stories from both 2000 AD and the Judge Dredd Megazine are currently being reprinted in their original order of publication in a series of trade paperbacks. Stories from the regular issues of 2000 AD and the Megazine are collected in a series entitled Judge Dredd: The Complete Case Files. This series began in 2005 and is still ongoing, reaching its fiftieth volume in May 2026. Stories from special holiday issues and annuals appeared in Judge Dredd: The Restricted Files. This four-volume series began in 2010 and concluded in 2012.

In 2012, Dredd was one of ten British comic characters commemorated in a series of stamps issued by the Royal Mail.

Between 2015 and 2018, Hachette Partworks published a fortnightly partwork collection of hardback books entitled Judge Dredd: The Mega Collection. This included not only Judge Dredd stories but also a variety of spin-off stories set in the same universe.

== Character and appearance ==
Judge Dredd from his first published story, as drawn by Mike McMahon in 1977. The character's appearance has remained essentially unchanged since, except for a more prominent jawline.

Joe Dredd is the most famous of the Street Judges that patrol Mega-City One, empowered to instantly convict, sentence, and sometimes execute offenders. Dredd is armed with a "Lawgiver", a pistol programmed to recognise only his palm-print and capable of firing six types of ammunition, a daystick, a boot knife and stun or gas grenades. His helmet obscures his face, except for his mouth and jaw. He rides a large "Lawmaster" motorcycle equipped with machine-guns, a powerful laser cannon, and full artificial intelligence capable of responding to orders from the Judge and operating itself.

In an interview, Ezquerra commented on how he designed the character, stating he received the basic description of "a menacing policeman dressed in black and driving a motorbike." He later described his process on creating the character: "When I create a character, I'll do it fairly quickly, the longer you stay working on an idea, the more chances you have to spoil it and Dredd was not an exception. I draw the essentials: grim face, black suit, menacing helmet (based on the Greeks), protections, and gun readily available when sitting on the bike, after that I started to embellish the protections and bike with symbols, maybe a couple of days in total."

Dredd's entire face is never shown in the strip. This began as an unofficial guideline, but soon became a rule. As John Wagner explained: "It sums up the facelessness of justice − justice has no soul. So it isn't necessary for readers to see Dredd's face, and I don't want you to".

On rare occasions, Dredd's face has been seen in flashbacks to his childhood; but these pictures lack detail. In an early story, Dredd is forced to remove his helmet and the other characters react as if he is disfigured, but his face was covered by a faux censorship sticker. In prog 52, during Dredd's tenure on the Lunar Colonies, he uses a 'face-change' machine to impersonate the crooked lawyer of a gang of bank robbers.

In Carlos Ezquerra's original design, Dredd had large lips, "to put a mystery as to his racial background". Not all of the artists who worked on the strip were told of this. Mike McMahon drew Dredd as a black man, while Brian Bolland and Ron Smith drew him as white. The strip was not yet printed in colour, and this went unnoticed. The idea was dropped.

Time passes in the Judge Dredd strip in real time, so as a year passes in life, a year passes in the comic. The first Dredd story, published in 1977, was set in 2099, 122 years in the future, and so stories published in 2026 are set 122 years in the future, in 2148. Consequently, as former editor Alan McKenzie explains, "every year that goes by Dredd gets a year older – unlike Spider-Man, who has been a university student for the past twenty-five years!". Therefore, Dredd was 38 when he first appeared, but is now 86–87 years old, with 68–69 years of active service (2079–2148), and for almost 30 years Dredd's age and fitness for duty were recurring plot points (in prog 1595 (2008), Dredd was diagnosed with benign cancer of the duodenum).

How Dredd's aging would be addressed was a source of reader speculation until 2016, when writer Michael Carroll and artist Ben Willsher published the story "Carousel", in which Dredd is ordered to undertake rejuvenation treatment that restores him to his physical prime. Regarding the possible death of the character, in an interview with Empire in 2012 Wagner said: "There could be many ways to end it, but the probability is that I won't still be around when it happens! I would love to write it, but I can't see it happening. I'll leave the script in my will".

=== Weapon ===
The Lawgiver is a fictional weapon used by the Judges including Judge Dredd. The Lawgiver is a self-loading handgun featuring manual and automatic focusing and targeting, plus a built-in computer capable of controlling its operation. An in-line gunsight shows the view directly down the barrel. A Lawgiver can only be operated by its designated Judge owner, whose palm print is programmed into the gun's memory. Any attempt by a non-designated user, even another Judge, to fire a Lawgiver causes the weapon to self-destruct (a feature introduced by writer Malcolm Shaw).

The gun fires six different kinds of rounds, which a Judge can switch via voice command:

- Standard execution – A standard bullet.
- Heat Seeker or Hot Shot – Heatseeker rounds lock onto the target's heat source.
- Ricochet – A bullet coated with rubber. Ricochet rounds can bounce off solid surfaces while retaining enough kinetic energy to penetrate flesh. This enables the Judge to, for example, kill a perp who is using a human shield, bouncing their shot off a back wall and hitting the target from behind.
- Incendiary – A napalm round.
- Armour Piercing – Useful against robots and armoured opponents.
- High-Explosive (Hi-Ex) – An explosive shell.

As well as the usual six rounds listed above, a stun shot has also been depicted in the comic, and a variety of other rounds have been shown in the films.

== Setting ==
Dredd's first stories take place in the year 2099, 122 years after their publication date in 1977. His regular stories are generally set 122 years after their real-world publication date (unless otherwise stated as a flashback or prequel story), so that stories published in 2026 are set in 2148.

The setting of Judge Dredd is a dystopian future Earth damaged by a series of international conflicts; much of the planet has become radioactive wasteland, and so populations have aggregated in enormous conurbations known as 'mega-cities'. The story is centred on the megalopolis of Mega-City One, on the east coast of North America. Within Mega-City One, extensive automation (including intelligent robots) has rendered the majority of the population unemployed. As a consequence, the general population is prone to embracing any fashion or craze they encounter. Mega-City One is surrounded by the inhospitable "Cursed Earth", a radioactive desert populated by outlaws and mutants. Much of the remaining world's geography is somewhat vague, although other mega-cities are visited in the strip.

The majority of Mega-City One's population lives in gigantic towers known as City Blocks, each holding some 50,000 people. Each is named after some historical person or TV character, usually for comic effect. A minority live in "mopads" - an evolution of the mobile home, and constantly travel Mega-City One's extensive road network. Mega-City One extends from Boston to Charlotte; but extended into Florida before the Apocalypse War laid waste to the southern sectors. At its height, the city contained a population of about 800 million; after the Apocalypse War, it was halved to 400 million.

=== The Judge system ===
Street Judges act as police, judge, jury, and executioner. Capital punishment in Mega-City One is rarely used, though deaths while resisting arrest are commonplace. Numerous writers have used the Judge System to satirize contemporary politics.

Judges, once appointed, can be broadly characterised as "Street Judges" (who patrol the city), and administrative (office-based) Judges. The Justice Department is responsible not only for law enforcement, but is also the government, since the United States was overthrown in 2070 following the Third World War, which devastated much of America. The Judges are a ruling class, the ordinary citizens having no participation in government except at the municipal level. Dredd was once offered the job of Chief Judge, but he refused it.

The Judge System has spread world-wide, with various super-cities possessing similar methods of law enforcement. As such, this political model has become the most common form of government on Earth, with only a few small areas practicing civilian rule.

== Fictional character biography ==
In 2066, Joseph Dredd and his older (by twelve minutes) "brother" Rico Dredd are cloned from the DNA of Chief Judge Fargo, the founder of the Judge System, who was said to have died in the line of duty years before. Their growth is artificially accelerated in gestation so they are "born" with the physiological and mental development of a five-year-old child, with appropriate knowledge and training already implanted in their brains. The last name "Dredd" is chosen by the genetic scientist who created them, Morton Judd, to "instill fear in the population."

In 2070, the corrupt President Robert Linus Booth starts World War III, also known as the Atomic Wars, and the Judges move to restore order to the panic-stricken public. Cadets Joe Dredd and Rico Dredd are temporarily made full judges to help restore order under the supervision of Judge Kinnison, despite being physically and mentally only nine years old. They make their first kills stopping a rape gang but are unable to prevent Kinnison's death in action. During the war, they discover their clone-father Eustace Fargo is still alive, hidden by higher ranking judges. Seeing them as kin, Fargo recruits Joe and Rico to be his temporary bodyguards. He openly tells them his doubts regarding the Justice Department, wondering if the system has taken away "life, liberty, and the pursuit of happiness" while trying to instill strict order and control. Three weeks later, Fargo is placed in suspended animation and the Dredd brothers return to the Academy. After the Battle of Armageddon in 2071, President "Bad Bob" Booth is captured, tried for war crimes, and sentenced to suspended animation. In the wake of World War III, the office of the President is retired and the Judges now have full control over what is left of America.

Distinguishing themselves, the Dredds are fast tracked through the Academy of Law. Rico graduates at the top of their class in 2079, with Joseph graduating second. Joe's final assessment is done under the supervision of Judge Morphy, who is impressed with the young man and passes him. Joe later discovers Rico has embraced corruption, engaging in multiple crimes including murder, justifying his actions by saying Judges are thugs and killers by nature. Rico asks Joe to help him cover his crimes, but Joe arrests his brother instead, sentencing him to 20 years of hard labour on the penal colony on Saturn's moon Titan (a typical punishment for corrupt Judges). Joe Dredd continues operating as a judge, quickly gaining a reputation throughout the city as a formidable and incorruptible law enforcement agent. In 2099, Rico Dredd returns to Earth after serving his 20-year sentence. He comes after Joe for revenge, challenging him to a fast draw. No longer used to Earth's gravity, Rico loses and Joe shoots him dead in self-defence. Visibly upset, Joe insists he be the one to carry his brother's body away.

Over the decades, Joe Dredd becomes a major force protecting Mega-City One and is sometimes the biggest catalyst in preventing its destruction. Offered the opportunity to become Chief Judge in 2101, Dredd declines, preferring to serve on the streets enforcing the law, though he does temporarily serve in other senior positions. In "Tour of Duty", Dredd is appointed to the Council of Five, Mega-City One's highest governing body below the Chief Judge, on which he serves for two years (2132 to 2134). On several occasions, he saves his city from conquest or destruction by powerful enemies, and in 2114, he saves the entire world during the Fourth World War.

In 2107, Dredd loses his eyes in combat during the story City of the Damned. He has them replaced with bionic eyes that grant him night vision. In 2112, he suffers near-fatal wounds when a battle causes him to fall into a lake of acidic chemicals, burning his entire body. Later, he undergoes rejuvenation treatment, healing him and adding more vitality than a man his age would normally have. In 2130, Dredd is diagnosed with cancer of the duodenum, though it was benign. In 2138, at 72 years old, Dredd undergoes another "rejuve" treatment after being ordered to do so. It is specified that his entire epidermis, vascular, and muscular tissue are rebuilt on a cellular level, once again restoring some lost youth and vitality. He turns down an offer for a full treatment that would rebuild his internal organs and skeleton.

Although Dredd holds his duty above every other priority, this devotion is not blind. On two occasions (in "The Robot Wars" and "Tale of the Dead Man"), Dredd resigns from the force on principle, but both times he later returns, believing the Judge System, while imperfect and vulnerable to corruption, is the best protection that currently exists for people. In 2113, Dredd insists the Justice Department gamble its existence on a referendum to prove its legitimacy. In 2116, he risks 20 years imprisonment with hard labour when he challenges the policy of a Chief Judge. In 2129, Dredd threatens to resign if the Chief Judge does not change the city's harsh anti-mutant apartheid laws.

In 2129 (2000 AD #1535), Dredd is present when his clone-father Eustace Fargo is revived from cryogenic suspension, only to die later the same day. Before Fargo dies, he calls for Dredd to be at his side and admits his conclusion that the Judge system was a mistake that killed the American Dream, that it was meant to fix things but not last forever. Since Joe and Rico Dredd are his blood, Eustace hopes they will fix his mistakes, implying they should replace the Judge System with something else (he was unaware Rico Dredd had gone renegade and later died by Joe's hand). After Eustace Fargo dies, Dredd decides not to share the man's final words.

In more recent years, Dredd has met other Fargo clones such as Kraken and Nimrod. He has also developed a family of sorts with the introduction of two younger clones of his own named Dolman and Judge Rico (no first name). Dredd also discovered his older brother Rico Dredd fathered a daughter, Vienna Dredd, who now sees Joe as an uncle.

=== Family and associates ===
- Judge Rico Dredd. Judge Joe Dredd's older "brother," also cloned from Chief Judge Eustace Fargo and initially superior to him in physical skills. Soon after Joseph and Rico Dredd became Judges, Rico became corrupt. Joe arrested him and sentenced him to twenty years on the penal colony on Saturn's moon Titan. Twenty years later, Rico sought revenge, and Joe killed him in self-defense.
- Vienna. The daughter of Rico Dredd and a journalist who visited him on Titan. Dredd considers her his niece and goes out of his way to help her on occasion.
- Judge Rico. A clone created directly from Joe Dredd's own DNA, identical to him but decades younger. Rather than adopt the same last name as Joe Dredd, this clone decides to redeem the name of Joe's late, corrupt older brother and so becomes Judge Rico with no first name. Judge Rico eventually inherits Joe Dredd's old apartment at Rowdy Yates Block.
- Judge Anderson. For years, Dredd had a close but uneasy friendship with Cassandra Anderson of Psi-Division, which came to an end when Anderson briefly abandoned the law. After she returned to duty, Dredd initially denied their friendship, but re-affirmed it after she was injured while saving the city. Dredd has great respect for Anderson's abilities and trusts her often with his life, but sometimes finds her flippant attitude and playful jokes annoying.
- Judge Hershey. Dredd knew Chief Judge Hershey for forty years. Like all chief judges since Goodman, Dredd had easy access to her, but they also had a personal relationship based on mutual respect. While they had differences at times, Dredd believed her to be "the best chief judge we've ever had". After Hershey became terminally ill, she hid her illness from Dredd and all others but requested him to be at her side when she chose to be euthanised. Her death was initially faked so she could leave the city on an undercover mission, but after completing her private mission (and one final meeting with Dredd) her illness claimed her on her own terms - while bringing law to the lawless.
- Dolman. Another clone grown from Joe Dredd's DNA, but years younger. Formerly a trainee judge and member of the MC1 Space Corps. Has undergone face changing procedures to hide his heritage and so bears no resemblance to Dredd or Rico, and Vienna is the only person outside the Justice Department who knows his true identity.
- Judge Beeny. Dredd's protégée since 2007. On Dredd's recommendation, Hershey appointed her to the Council of Five. She was initially dismissed from the council when Hershey stepped down but was later reappointed by Chief Judge Logan.
- Walter the Wobot and Maria. Dredd used to rent his Rowdy Yates Block apartment from Maria, a landlady with a thick, stereotypical Italian accent. After helping the Judges fight a robot revolution, a former vending machine robot called Walter the Wobot became the city's first free robot and moved in with Dredd, acting as his cook and housekeeper out of love. After several years, Dredd parts company with both Walter and Maria. Walter starts a business, then briefly goes rogue and starts his own robot revolution, leading Dredd and the second Judge Giant to arrest him. Dredd later assigns Walter a probation sentence of community service as house robot and caretaker of Mrs Gunderson.
- Mrs Gunderson. A deaf widow living in Sylvia Plath Block in a large apartment with multiple bedrooms that she often rents. Following the "Necropolis" affair, the supernatural alien Judge Death rented a room from her, using the name "Jay De'Ath." Mrs. Gunderson was unaware of Judge Death's true nature due to the fact she is partially deaf and nearly blind, and he spared her after concluding she was the one truly innocent soul he had met. Since that story, she has been an occasional recurring character used for comic relief.
- Galen DeMarco. A former Judge infatuated with Dredd. This breach of regulations led her to resign from the Justice System and become a private investigator. Dredd first tried to help her adjust to civilian life but she severed contact when he again rejected her advances. She has her own occasional series called DeMarco P. I.
- Fargo clan. A town occupied by the mutated descendants of Ephram Fargo, the twin brother of Chief Judge Eustace Fargo. These mutants, who share the common mutation of an overly large, exaggerated chin, are relatives of Judge Dredd himself, and consider him a "cousin". This led to Dredd campaigning to have Mega-City One's mutant segregation laws repealed.
- Judge Morphy. Dredd's mentor at the beginning of his career. The two maintained a respect and appreciation for each other over the years, arguably making him one of Dredd's only friends. The same day he told Dredd he would retire from street duty soon and hoped to become a teacher, Morphy was killed in the line of duty.
- Judge Logan. Dredd's assistant for a number of years, later promoted to Senior Judge and later Sector House Chief (Sector 6). Dredd encouraged Logan to stand for Chief Judge when Hershey resigned. Dredd's and Hershey's public endorsements were instrumental in Logan being elected as Chief Judge.
- Judge Giant Senior. Dredd's first cadet trainee, introduced during Dredd's first year of stories. Having graduated from the Academy of Law, he was assigned to Dredd for his final field assessment, which he passed. Giant was a recurring character for years and saved Dredd from execution when Mega-City One was temporarily controlled by the insane Chief Judge Cal. Judge Giant Sr. was shot in the back and killed in the line of duty during the "Block Mania" story (1981) while trying to arrest Orlok, just before the Apocalypse War.
- Judge Giant Junior. Judge Giant fathered a child in 2101 before his death, despite judges being prohibited from having sexual relations. Orphaned in 2104, Giant's son was inducted into the Academy of Law. Years later, the ten-year-old Cadet Giant was supervised on a field test by Judge Dredd. Giant spent the next several years as a cadet, helping Dredd on different occasions such as during the "Necropolis" affair and "Judgement Day." Five years after his introduction, Giant's final assessment was conducted by Judge Dredd and he became a street judge in 2116, the youngest to do so, at age 15.
- Judge Dekker. Dredd's second cadet trainee, first appearing in "Super Bowl" (in 2000 AD #370–371, 1984). Dekker quickly proved her worth and became a judge after Dredd's assessment. The two fought alongside each other several times after she became a full Judge, and Dredd considered her his best cadet trainee. She died during the 1992 story "Judgement Day."
- Judge Kraken. Another clone of Chief Judge Fargo, decades younger than Joe Dredd but otherwise identical in appearance and similar in skill. Kraken was created by Morton Judd, the geneticist who cloned and named Joe and Rico Dredd. Kraken was one of the Judda, clones subservient to Judd. After Judd's defeat, Kraken is groomed to one day succeed Dredd and trained to become a Judge, though Dredd believes he isn't mentally fit. When Dredd first temporarily quits, Chief Judge Silver makes Kraken a Judge and has him impersonate Dredd so others won't know that one of Mega-City's greatest lost faith in the system. Kraken is then manipulated and corrupted by the Dark Judges, forced to help them temporarily turn Mega-City One into Necropolis, leading to the deaths of 60 million. After the Dark Judges are defeated, Kraken's mind is free and he peacefully accepts execution by Dredd.
- Joe Fargo. Joe Dredd himself, from a parallel universe in which the Judges were abolished in or around 2101. This version of Dredd became a police officer, and later married and retired. He was transported to Dredd's timeline in 2147 in unexplained circumstances, where he was given a small pension, a private investigator's licence, and the new name Fargo.
- Cadet Jessica Paris. A clone of Joe Dredd grown without SRY, making her a woman as a result. Has only made a single appearance in the comic to date in which she was shown as being heavily pregnant and the decision on what to do with her and the child being left ambiguous.

=== Recurring adversaries ===
Dredd's adversaries generally do not return in sequels, since they are usually killed or sentenced to long terms of incarceration. However, a few villains have returned in multiple stories, and some later got their own spin-off series.

- The Dark Judges are a group of undead judges from another dimension, who believe that since all crime is committed by the living, life itself should be a crime. Usually four in number, their leader Judge Death may be said to be Dredd's arch-enemy. Death was first introduced to the series in 1980 and has featured in many stories since, in Judge Dredd and in his own series.
- Orlok the Assassin was a secret agent from East-Meg One, the Russian counterpart to Mega-City One. He killed millions of innocent citizens with a chemical weapon.
- Mean Machine Angel is a psychopath from the Cursed Earth around Texas. He had a cybernetic arm and head, and preferred to kill people by head-butting them to death. Generally used as comic relief.
- PJ Maybe was a serial killer who murdered his first victim at the age of only 12. He evaded detection several times, and claimed thousands of victims, including a mayor and a deputy mayor of Mega-City One, over a criminal career lasting three decades.
- Judge Jura Edgar was a serious adversary of Dredd even before he discovered that she was a criminal. A high-ranking judge (the head of the Public Surveillance Unit), Edgar clashed with Dredd several times, and sometimes got the better of him: a very rare example of an opponent Dredd could not simply arrest or kill.

== Major storylines ==
There have been a number of Judge Dredd stories that have significantly developed the Dredd character and/or the fictional world, or which create and add to a larger storyline. These are listed below (for a complete list of all stories see here).

- The Robot Wars (2000 AD progs 10–17; prologue in prog 9). The Mega-City Judges face an uprising by the city's robot servant workforce, led by carpenter-droid Call-Me-Kenneth. The first multi-part Dredd story. Walter the Wobot, a robot who often pronounces R sounds as W, helps Dredd against the uprising and rallies together other robots that wish to still serve humanity. As a result, he is made a "free robot". Due to his love and respect for Dredd, Walter decides to remain as the judge's personal valet, housekeeper, and cook.
- The Return of Rico (prog 30). It is revealed that Joe Dredd is a clone who was artificially aged and trained to be a judge since childhood. The story also reveals he has an older (by 12 minutes) clone "brother" Rico Dredd who became a judge alongside him. Rico grew corrupt, taking bribes and killing people in his way until Joe arrested him, leading to a sentence of 20 years' hard labor on Saturn's moon Titan (this penal colony will be mentioned again in several later stories, particularly as a place where renegade judges are sent). Now in 2099, 20 years later, Rico comes to Mega-City One seeking revenge. No longer used to Earth's gravity, Rico Dredd is outdrawn and killed by Joe, who seems to mourn his brother despite their differences. Some later stories expand Rico's life and personality.
- Luna-1 (multiple stories; progs 42–59) Dredd is assigned to act for six months as Judge Marshall of Luna-1, a colony on Earth's moon governed by judges from all three Mega-Cities. This story introduced Luna-1 and Judges from East-Meg One and Texas City.
- The Cursed Earth (progs 61–85). Dredd, accompanied by punk biker Spikes Harvey Rotten (and later the alien Tweak), leads a small group of Judges on an epic journey across the Cursed Earth, transporting vaccine for the deadly 2T-FRU-T virus that is devastating Mega-City Two. This multi-part epic is often referred to as 'the first Dredd epic' and was inspired by Roger Zelazny's Damnation Alley.
- The Day the Law Died (progs 89–108; prologues in 86–88). It is 2101. The insane Judge Cal, head of the Special Judicial Squad (SJS), arranges the assassination of Chief Judge Goodman and then assumes the man's position himself. By brainwashing Judges and employing alien mercenaries, Cal rules Mega-City One like a new version of Caligula. Dredd rallies together a few other Judges and Judge-Tutors to lead a resistance movement, and eventually Fergee kills Cal. This story introduced the alien Kleggs and saw Chief Judge Griffin assume the Chief Judgeship after Cal's death.
- Judge Death (progs 149–151). The first appearance of Judge Death and Dredd's recurring ally Psi-Judge Anderson. On a parallel Earth, the undead Judge Death decides that since crime is committed by the living, life itself is a crime and the only sentence is death. After laying waste to his Earth (later called Deadworld), Judge Death arrives in Dredd's dimension in 2102, determined to continue killing. His body is destroyed in battle with the Judges, leading his spirit to seek a new host until he is trapped inside the powerful telepathic mind of Psi-Judge Anderson. Anderson subjects herself to suspended animation, acting as a living cage. A later story reveals Judge Death was not alone but was one of four "Dark Judges".
- The Judge Child (progs 156–181; epilogue in 182). Along with taking Judge Dredd outside the boundaries of Mega-City One, this story introduced several long-running characters and concepts into the Dredd mythos including: Judge Hershey, The Angel Gang (except for Fink Angel, introduced later), Murd the Oppressor, the Judge Child, and the new head of the SJS, McGruder. This story also begins writer Alan Grant's tenure as John Wagner's long-term co-writer of the Dredd series. The story starts when Psi-Judge Feyy, the best 'pre-cog' in Psi-Division, predicts that a psychic child bearing the mark of the Eagle of Justice will need to rule Mega-City One in order to save it from a future disaster. Dredd is assigned to lead a team on a galaxy-spanning search for the "Judge Child", Owen Krsyler, leading to several battles, as well as Judge Lopez losing his life. Dredd realizes the boy's psychic predictions of death and disaster are intentionally caused by manipulative, self-fulfilling prophecies. On finding Owen Krysler, Dredd concludes that he is evil and abandons the Judge Child on the planet Xanadu rather than risk Mega-City One having a corrupt ruler, despite his orders and the sacrifices made. In the epilogue, Dredd's reputation is shaken and Judge McGruder questions his judgment, however he would be vindicated by events that occur in City of the Damned
- Judge Death Lives! (progs 224–228). Voted #3 for "best story ever printed" in the Dredd comics in a 2005 poll on the 2000 AD online website, this tale introduced the other three Dark Judges: Judges Fear, Fire and Mortis. A year after Judge Death's defeat, the three other Dark Judges journey to Dredd's dimension, free Death from Judge Anderson's mind, and provide him a new host body. After the host body is killed and made undead, Judge Death regains his full power and leads the other three on a killing spree. Released from suspended animation, Anderson joins Dredd in fighting the Dark Judges. The two then follow the quartet to their native parallel Earth, the 'Deadworld.' By tapping into the psychic anguish of all their victims, Anderson is seemingly able to destroy the four Dark Judges (though they will return years later).
- Block Mania (progs 236–244). Contamination of water supplies by Orlok the Assassin leads to madness and violent aggression in many citizens. Minor wars break out between many city blocks of Mega-City One. This story introduced Orlok and saw the death of Judge Giant.
- The Apocalypse War (progs 245–270, except 268). In 2104, Mega-City One is still weakened by the events of Block Mania, leaving it a vulnerable target for the Soviet forces of East-Meg One. Almost half the city (400 million people) are killed in nuclear strikes, while more die from radiation sickness, starvation, and cold. The Mega-City Judges are unable to strike back, as the Soviet city is protected by a dimensional force field that sends all incoming nukes to a parallel Earth. The Judges fight a guerilla war that eventually culminates in the destruction of East-Meg One when Dredd captures a Soviet missile bunker. This story features the death of Chief Judge Griffin, with McGruder becoming the new Chief Judge.
- City of the Damned (progs 393–406). By 2107, the Judges have developed reliable - albeit power-hungry - time travel technology. Dredd and Anderson travel to the year 2120 to discover more about the disaster predicted in The Judge Child storyline. Arriving in May 2120, Mega-City One is a wasteland inhabited by monsters, vampire Judges, and ruled by a powerful being called the Mutant. Dredd is separated from Anderson and blinded. He learns the Mutant is a clone of the Judge Child Owen Krysler, born with an inhuman appearance but inheriting all of his memories. The Mutant caused the destruction of Mega-City One and, for his own amusement reanimated the future corpse of Dredd, making him a zombie servant. Chased by his undead double, Dredd and Anderson flee back to 2107, where his eyes are replaced by bionics. The Judge Child clone is then located in 2107 and killed, along with all those involved, supposedly erasing the dystopian timeline. Anderson questions the certainty of this though as the Zombie Dredd still exists in their current timeline. This storyline was originally intended to be much longer, but the creative team disliked time-travel stories and decided to finish the saga early.
- Oz (progs 545–570). When sky-surfer Chopper breaks out of jail and flees to the Sydney-Melbourne Conurb in Australia to take part in the (now legal) Supersurf 10, Dredd is sent to retrieve him. But Dredd's real mission is to fight former Council of Five member Morton Judd, the scientist who created him from the cloned DNA of Judge Fargo. After escaping justice 40 years earlier, Judd has created a new army of clones called the Judda, planning to use them to dominate Mega-City One. Dredd destroys the Judda's base in Uluru (Ayers Rock) with a nuclear bomb, although some Judda survive and are captured.
- The Dead Man (progs 650–662). When first published in 2000 AD, this was not billed as a 'Judge Dredd' tale and was printed as an extra storyline while the main 'Judge Dredd' series continued in parallel. No references to established Dredd comic locations or characters were made until the storyline's last few chapters. The story begins when a boy named Yassa Povey, one of a group of settlers living in a desolate landscape, discovers an amnesiac near-dead man whose entire body and face have been burned. Supernatural forces hunt the Dead Man, who then retraces his steps with Yassa's help. In the 11th chapter of the story, the two find the remains of a Judge uniform and a badge reading "Dredd". The Dead Man recalls he is Joseph Dredd and that, following the events of "A Letter to Judge Dredd", he recently lost faith in the system and retired, taking the "long walk" into the Cursed Earth (where Yassa lives). He was then attacked by psychic projections of the Sisters of Death, the witches who made the Dark Judges into supernatural monsters, which led to him falling into an acidic chemical lake. After encountering the Sisters again, Dredd returns Yassa home and heads back to Mega-City One.
- A Letter to Judge Dredd (prog 661). Published alongside the penultimate chapter of "The Dead Man" storyline, this story reveals that during the Judges' suppression of a protest rally of Democrats (citizens who want democracy instead of Judge control), a protestor named Sholley was struck so hard he suffered permanent brain damage. Sholley has regular fits of violent delusions for the next two years, often attacking his family. Since Dredd was in charge of breaking up the rally that day, a boy named Wenders writes to him asking why Sholley was permanently injured during a seemingly peaceful protest. He also has several questions regarding the effectiveness and fairness of the Judge system when crime, violence, and corruption don't improve, the people fear their own protectors, and punishments are dealt so harshly by people whose judgment may not be perfect. Sholley has another violent episode and kills Wenders, whose letter is given to Dredd. Already having had doubts for years, Dredd questions the Judge system even more after reading it. Thus the story reveals what set in motion his retirement mentioned in "The Dead Man", and sets up a chain of events in stories to follow.
- Tale of the Dead Man (progs 662–668). The first chapter of this story was published in the same issue as the final chapter of "The Dead Man", linking that story back into the main "Judge Dredd" series. As Dredd heads back to Mega-City One following the events of "The Dead Man", he recalls what led to him retiring and leaving for the Cursed Earth. Disillusioned with the system, Dredd assesses his younger clone-brother Kraken, a former Judda who is now a Cadet. During the assessment, Dredd's former mentor Morphy is killed, bringing up more feelings in Dredd that his own time as a Judge should end. Kraken impresses many but Dredd sees a glimmer of Judda attitude when the young man is angry, and recommends he not be a Judge. Dredd then announces his retirement and pardons all the Democrats he arrested from the protest two years earlier mentioned in the Wenders letter. The next day, he leaves for the Cursed Earth, leading into the events of "The Dead Man". This story acts as a prologue to Necropolis.
- Countdown to Necropolis (progs 669–673). Kraken is sentenced to death based on Dredd's belief that he is still a Judda at heart. But this is actually a final test of loyalty to see if he attempts to defend himself. Seeing that Kraken accepts the sentence and is willing to execute himself, Chief Judge Silver makes him a full Judge. Since the population of Mega-City One and most Judges don't know that Dredd retired, Silver then orders Judge Kraken to pretend to be Dredd for the time being, to avoid admitting to the public that such a famous and trusted Judge lost faith in the justice system. Meanwhile, a woman named Xena is becoming obsessed with Judge Death, having barely survived an encounter with him during one of the previous Dark Judge rampages. It is revealed that the Sisters of Death have influenced Xena from Deadworld, gaining her loyalty and convincing her she will be the "Bride of Death". Eventually, they use her mind and life force to create a psychic bridge allowing them to manifest on Earth.
- Necropolis (progs 674–699). Two months after Dredd left Mega-City One, the Sisters of Death attack and take control of the vulnerable minded Judge Kraken. Realizing Xena is too weak to be of much further use, the Sisters have Kraken bring them Psi-Judge Kit Agee so her psychic power can form a stronger bridge from Deadworld. Increasingly corrupted by the Sisters, Kraken later forces an extra-dimensional research lab to bring the Dark Judges back to Mega-City One. The Sisters use magic to corrupt MC1 into "Necropolis" and the Dark Judges take over, making Kraken a fifth Dark Judge and corrupting many Judges who can't resist. Under their rule, the population is systematically murdered, while some commit suicide to avoid horrific death. Finding the retired former Chief Judge McGruder in the Cursed Earth, Dredd recruits her and returns to Mega-City One. He then recruits Anderson and others. Locating Agee, they kill her, cutting off the Sisters' power and influence. Judges Mortis, Fear, and Fire are then captured. In the end, 60 million are dead, their bodies buried in a mass grave just outside the walls of Mega-City One. Freed from being a slave to the Dark Judges, Kraken welcomes his execution by Dredd. With Chief Judge Thomas Silver missing and presumed dead, McGruder returns to the position of Chief Judge but decides not to create a new Council of Five.
- Return of the King (progs 733-735). In this aftermath to Necropolis, the undead Chief Judge Silver returns to the Grand Hall of Justice. After his botched suicide attempt, Silver had been captured and murdered by Judge Death who reanimated him as a zombie (albeit with all his mental faculties intact) and tortured him mercilessly. Fearing summary execution by the survivors of the Necropolis, Silver had hidden for months before discovering that, in his absence, his predecessor McGruder had reclaimed the office of chief judge. A constitutional crisis breaks out when Silver challenges McGruder's right to be chief judge, pointing out she had resigned the position whereas he had not. Silver and McGruder agree to abide by Dredd's decision as to who is the rightful chief judge. Since Silver had never resigned or been formally removed from power, Dredd rules in his favour, formally returning Silver to office. Dredd then tells Silver he is unfit for command and convicts him of gross dereliction of duty for precipitating the Necropolis and deserting his command in time of war. Initially sentencing Silver to twenty years of penal servitude, Dredd defers the sentence to execution. Silver pleads for his life but an impassive Dredd incinerates him to ashes, making McGruder chief judge by default.
- The Devil You Know and Twilight's Last Gleaming (progs 750–753 and 754–756). The long-running tensions in Mega-City One between the totalitarian Judge system and the movement for the restoration of democracy conclude with a vote. A large number of apathetic citizens take no part in the process, while the majority of those who do vote want the Judges to remain in control. A pro-democracy protest march of almost 2 million people heads for Justice Central and is ready to riot, but Dredd convinces the leaders the referendum was fair and votes were counted accurately. During this time, Dredd undergoes "rejuve" treatment for the first time, restoring his damaged skin and muscle from "The Dead Man" story and gaining more vitality and youth than a man his age should have.
- Top Dogs (Judge Dredd Annual 1991). Published in 1990, this is the first crossover between Judge Dredd's stories and another long-running 2000 AD comic strip Strontium Dog starring Johnny Alpha. Mutated by strontium radiation fallout resulting from a nuclear war in 2150, Alpha (like many mutants) works as a Search/Destroy Agent, bounty hunters often referred to as "S/D" Agents or "Strontium Dogs". In this story, Johnny and his partner Wulf Sternhammer time travel from 2176 to pursue fugitives who have escaped to Dredd's time in 2112. Although Dredd realizes Alpha and Sternhammer are time travelers, he does not recognize their legal authority and considers their actions criminal. After a fight and chase, the S/D Agency transports Johnny, Sternhammer, and their bounty target back to 2176. Dredd regards Alpha and Sternhammer as wanted fugitives. Although this story implies Alpha's stories are set in Dredd's future, writer John Wagner later said the world of Strontium Dog is one of several possible futures for Dredd's reality.
- America (Megazine 1.01–1.07). Dredd's philosophy is explored when democracy activists resort to terrorism. This story introduces the tragic characters America Jara and Bennett Beeny, as well as the terrorist group Total War.
- Batman/Judge Dredd: Judgement on Gotham, an intercompany crossover story co-published by DC Comics and Fleetway, written by Alan Grant and John Wagner, and featuring painted artwork by Simon Bisley. The universe-hopping undead monster Judge Death uses dimension-jump technology to breach the DC Universe and attack Gotham City. Batman uses the same technology to travel to Dredd's reality, leading to a battle and then the Dark Knight's arrest. After scanning Batman's mind, Judge Anderson realizes they're on the same side and helps him return to Gotham to stop Judge Death and Scarecrow. Dredd reluctantly joins forces with Batman, returning home with Anderson once Death is defeated. The story was followed by three other crossovers also written by Wagner and Grant but with different artists each time: Batman/Judge Dredd: Vendetta in Gotham, Batman/Judge Dredd: The Ultimate Riddle, and Batman/Judge Dredd: Die Laughing #1–2.
- Judgement Day (progs 786–799 and Megazine 2.04–2.09). Published in 1992, this was the first story to feature Johnny Alpha of Strontium Dog after his death in 1990. In this story, the villain Sabbat the Necromagus destroys a world in 2178 (two years before Alpha's Death) then journeys to Dredd's time in 2114. Johnny Alpha pursues him to ensure he doesn't completely alter future history. Using a lodestone to tap into Earth's own energy field, Sabbat re-animates most of Earth's dead, including the 60 million buried outside of Mega-City One after "Necropolis", and releases zombie armies against the world's Mega-Cities, causing the Fourth World War. Many minor supporting characters are killed, including Dredd's former cadet trainee Dekker. At an international conference of Judges, Sabbat briefly appears and explains that since he can control the dead, he will kill the entire human race to create a planet-scale army to conquer the galaxy. After learning the cities of Brasilia, Djakarta, Mega-City Two, Sino-Cit, and South-Am City have all fallen to Sabbat, Dredd suggests nuking them so the dead won't become new zombie soldiers. Although horrified this will kill any survivors still in those cities, the other cities agree and the attacks kill over 2 billion across Earth, with another billion later dying in the surviving cities from the zombies. When Sabbat's base is located in the Radlands of Ji (an area of post-nuclear China), Dredd leads a squad to stop him and Johnny Alpha tags along. In the end, only he and Dredd survive, decapitating Sabbat and pinning his head to his own magical lodestone so he can't regenerate or leave. With Sabbat's power shut down (even though his head lives), the undead armies fall. Dredd and Alpha are then forced to walk back to civilization from the Radlands, with Dredd deciding that Alpha's actions have earned him a pardon for crimes in Mega-City One. (The end of their journey together, and Johnny Alpha's return to the future, is told in the Big Finish Productions audio play Judge Dredd: Pre-Emptive Revenge starring Toby Longworth as Dredd and Simon Pegg as Johnny Alpha.)
- Mechanismo trilogy (Megazine 2.12–17, 2.22–26 and 2.37–43). After "Necropolis" and "Judgment Day", Mega-City has lost far too many judges. To combat this, the Chief Judge test-runs 10 robotic "Mechanismo" Judges, with disastrous results.
- Inferno (progs 842–853). Escaped rogue Judges from Titan take over the city, forcing the Judges into exile out in the Cursed Earth.
- Wilderlands storyline (progs 891–894 and 904–918 and Megazine 2.57–2.67). This story introduced Judge Volt and Judge Castillo, revived the Council of Five, and ended many long-running subplots, including the Mechanismo Program and McGruder's second stint as Chief Judge. Dredd is exposed as falsifying evidence to shut down the Mechanismo project and is arrested, while Chief Judge McGruder attempts to remain in power and see Mechanismo implemented. When a malfunctioning Mechanismo crashes a space cruiser on an alien world in an attempt to kill McGruder, Dredd takes control of the survivors.
- The Pit (progs 970–999). This story introduced Judge Galen DeMarco, who would become protagonist of her own strip. Dredd takes the job of Sector Chief at Sector 301, an isolated area of the city that has become a dumping ground for corrupt and incompetent judges.
- The Doomsday Scenario (progs 1141–1164 and 1167, and Megazine 3.52–3.59). The first series to run the same story from different viewpoints concurrently from start to finish, one in 2000 AD and the other in the Judge Dredd Megazine. One is told from the viewpoint of Galen DeMarco, now a civilian, as she is caught up in crimelord Nero Narcos' attempt to take over the city with his army of robots. The other is told from Dredd's viewpoint as he is taken prisoner by Orlok the Assassin and tried by the East-Meg One government in exile for his war crimes during the Apocalypse War. Once Dredd escapes (with Anderson's assistance), he secures the help of Brit-Cit in breaking Narcos' control over his robot hordes. The story saw the Judges briefly lose power and Chief Judge Volt commits suicide as a result. Hershey replaces him.
- Blood Cadets (progs 1186–1188). This introduces a new, young clone of Dredd who calls himself Rico (no first name) to try to redeem that name. Blood and Duty (progs 1300–1301) saw the return of Dredd's niece Vienna Pasternak. With Vienna's reintroduction and the arrival of Judge Rico, Dredd is given a family and several new plot points for future stories, including the Justice Department creating a large number of Dredd clones, and Dredd's problems with trying to connect with his niece.
- Helter Skelter (progs 1250-1261). Dredd and warp specialist Darien Kenzie battle an invasion from an alliance of alternate universes where Dredd's greatest foes were victorious, led by none other than Chief Judge Cal. This story features parallel version of previous Dredd foes such as Cal, Rico Dredd, War Marshal "Mad Dog" Kazan, Call-Me-Kenneth, Grampus the Klegg, Fink Angel, and Murd the Oppressor. Other non-Dredd characters from 2000 AD also appeared - albeit as background characters - from alternate universes, such as the Norts from Rogue Trooper, D.R. & Quinch and the Vampires from Fiends of the Eastern Front.
- Judge Dredd vs. Aliens (prog 2003 special and 1322–1335). Dredd faces the Xenomorphs, with mutant criminal 'Mister Bones' breeding an army thereof to attack the Department of Justice.
- Terror and Total War (progs 1392–1399 and 1408–1419). A pair of stories wherein the fanatical organisation 'Total War' smuggles 12 nuclear devices into the city and threatens to detonate them all unless the Judges leave. It includes explorations of Judge Dredd's extended family, including Vienna and another Dredd clone named Nimrod.
- Blood Trails (progs 1440–1449). Following elements of Total War and Gulag (where Dredd led a Judge team to try and free prisoners from the Sov block), a clone of Sov Judge Kazan tries to attack Dredd by targeting Vienna, sending the face-changing assassin Pasha to abduct her. In the aftermath of the story, the Kazan clone is cut loose by East-Meg 2 and claims political asylum from Mega-City One. Dredd's long-term ally Guthrie is severely injured, losing both legs and an arm, eventually becoming a cyborg. Judge Giant and Judge Rico are severely injured.
- Origins (progs 1505–1519 and 1529–1535; prologue in 1500–1504). Consisting largely of flashbacks, this story lays out the history of the Judges and founder Chief Judge Fargo, as well as scenes from Dredd's childhood during the Third World War.
- Mutants in Mega-City One (progs 1542–1545). The first in a series of short stories in which Dredd campaigns to change the apartheid laws prohibiting mutants from entering the city. This results in Chief Judge Hershey being voted out of office and replaced with Judge Francisco.
- Tour of Duty (progs 1650–1693). Judge Dredd is posted in the Cursed Earth to oversee the foundations of four new mutant townships. The corrupt Judge Martin Sinfield manipulates Francisco so he can become Chief Judge, and promptly becomes the target of repeated assassination attempts. Dredd is recalled to lead the investigation into the attacks, which are the work of serial mass-murderer PJ Maybe, who has assumed the identity of Mayor Byron Ambrose.
- Day of Chaos (progs 1743–1789) depicts the deaths of 87 per cent of the population of Mega-City One by a biological weapon unleashed by East-Meg survivors of the Apocalypse War.
- The Cold Deck (progs 1806–1811; prologue in 1803, epilogue in 1812). A cross-over between Dredd and the spin-offs The Simping Detective and Low Life, this story sees the machinations of Black Ops head Judge Bachmann, who is plotting a coup (the three stories together are known as Trifecta). Introduces Judge Smiley.
- Every Empire Falls (progs 1973–1990 and Megazine 371–374). An attempted coup in Mega-City One by the chief judge of Texas City, Pamela Oswin. Dredd is seemingly killed, but this is a deception to hide the fact that he has actually been kidnapped.
- Harvey (progs 2024-2029) and Machine Law (progs 2115-2122). This story introduces a new generation of robot judges that prove significantly more reliable than their predecessors and continue to appear in later stories. Judge Hershey resigns and is succeeded by Logan as Chief Judge.
- The Carousel (Judge Dredd Megazine vol. 5 #375, published in 2016). In the year 2138, Joe Dredd - now 72 years old - is ordered to undergo another "rejuve treatment" at the Carousel Clinic (the first rejuve treatment happened soon after "Necropolis" due to his injuries in "The Dead Man", in the years 2112 when he was 46). His entire epidermis, vascular system, and muscular tissue are restructured at a cellular level, giving him somewhat greater youth and vitality than a person his age and condition should have. Though he is told he can also have his internal organs and bones rebuilt, he turns this down, satisfied for now.
- The Small House (progs 2100-2109). The culmination of storylines started in Trifecta, Judge Dredd goes on the hunt for Judge Smiley's black ops unit that has been operating in the walls of the Justice Department for decades. Notable for the reveal of Dirty Frank's backstory, Dredd's break with some of his allies including Chief Judge Hershey, and the overt confrontation with the fascist nature of Mega-City One.

== Alternative versions ==
Shortly before the release of the 1995 film, three new comic book titles were released, followed by a one-off comic version of the film story.

Judge Dredd (DC Comics)

DC Comics published an alternative version of Judge Dredd between 1994 and 1996, lasting 18 issues. Continuity and history were different from both the original 2000 AD version and the 1995 film. A major difference was that Chief Judge Fargo, portrayed as incorruptible in the original version, was depicted as evil in the DC version. Most issues were written by Andrew Helfer, but the last issue was written by Gordon Rennie, who has since written Judge Dredd for 2000 AD (Note: the DC crossover story Batman/Judge Dredd: Judgment on Gotham featured the original Dredd, not the version depicted in this title).

Judge Dredd – Legends of the Law

Another DC Comics title, lasting 13 issues between 1994 and 1995. Although these were intended to feature the same version of Judge Dredd as in the other DC title, the first four issues were written by John Wagner and Alan Grant and were consistent with their original 2000 AD version.

Judge Dredd – Lawman of the Future

From the same publishers as 2000 AD, this was a follow on from the 1995 movie aimed at younger readers. Editor David Bishop prohibited writers from showing Dredd killing anyone, a reluctance which would be completely unfamiliar to readers acquainted with the original version. As one reviewer put it years later: "this was Judge Dredd with two vital ingredients missing: his balls." It ran fortnightly for 23 issues from 1995 to 1996, plus one Action Special.

Judge Dredd: The Official Movie Adaptation

Written by Andrew Helfer and illustrated by Carlos Ezquerra and Michael Danza. Published by Fleetway Publications in 1995.

Shōnen Jump

In Japan, manga comic Shōnen Jump Autumn Special (1995) included a one-off story featuring a unique version of Judge Dredd which was entirely different to both the comic character and the film character. Set in Tokyo in 2099, Dredd Takeru is a part-time street judge whose day job is working as a primary school teacher.

Heavy Metal Dredd

From the same publishers as 2000 AD, this was a series of ultra-violent one-off stories from "a separate and aggressive Dredd world". The first eight episodes were originally published in Rock Power magazine, and were all co-written by John Wagner and Alan Grant and illustrated by Simon Bisley. These were reprinted, together with 11 new stories (some by other creators), in Judge Dredd Megazine. The original eight stories were collected in a trade paperback by Hamlyn in 1993. The complete series was collected by Rebellion Developments in 2009.

Dredd (2012 film continuity)

In the week that the 2012 film Dredd was released in the UK, a 10-page prologue was published in issue #328 of Judge Dredd Megazine, written by its editor, Matt Smith, and illustrated by Henry Flint. "Top of the World, Ma-Ma" told the backstory of the film's main antagonist, Ma-Ma. Five more stories featuring this version of the character were published in Judge Dredd Megazine: "Underbelly" in #340–342 (2013), "Uprise" in #350–354 (2014), "Dust" in #367–371 (2015–'16), "Furies" in #386–387 (2017), and "The Dead World" in #392–396 (2018) (there were also two Judge Anderson stories featuring the film version of that character in #377–379).

Judge Dredd (IDW Publishing)

- In November 2012, IDW Publishing began a new monthly series written by Duane Swierczynski and illustrated by Nelson Daniel. It lasted for 30 issues.
- IDW began a new four-issue miniseries called Judge Dredd: Year One in March 2013, set during Dredd's first year as a judge.
- In September 2013, IDW began publishing the four-issue miniseries Mars Attacks Judge Dredd.
- In January 2014, IDW began another miniseries, Judge Dredd: Mega-City Two. There were five issues.
- In July 2015, IDW announced a new miniseries called Judge Dredd: Mega-City Zero, starting in January 2016. This ran for 12 issues, and then was followed by a sequel, set 10 years later, called Judge Dredd: The Blessed Earth, which lasted for nine issues.
- IDW and Dark Horse Comics published a four issue miniseries, Predator vs. Judge Dredd vs. Aliens, beginning in July 2016 and ending in June 2017.
- A one-shot comic called Deviations: Howl of the Wolf was published in 2017.
- A four-issue miniseries, Under Siege, began in May 2018. It is not connected with any previous IDW Judge Dredd series.
- Toxic began in October 2018 and ran for four issues.
- False Witness was a four-issue miniseries published in 2020.

Year One, Mega-City Two, Deviations, Under Siege, Toxic and False Witness were later reprinted in the Judge Dredd Megazine from 2022 to 2024.

== In other media ==
=== Films ===
==== Judge Dredd (1995) ====
An American film loosely based on the comic strip was released in 1995, starring Sylvester Stallone as Dredd. The film received generally negative reviews. On Rotten Tomatoes it has a 22% rating, and the site's critical consensus states that "Director [Danny] Cannon fails to find the necessary balance to make it work". In deference to its expensive Hollywood star, Dredd's face was shown. In the comic, he very rarely removes his helmet, and even then his real face is never revealed. Also, the writers largely omitted the ironic humour of the comic strip, and ignored important aspects of the "Dredd mythology". The co-creator and main writer of the comic character, John Wagner, said:

I hated that plot. It was Dredd pressed through the Hollywood cliché mill, a dynastic power struggle that had little connection with the character we know from the comic.

In retrospect the film received some praise for its depiction of Dredd's city, costumes, humour and larger-than-life characters.

==== Dredd (2012) ====
Reliance Entertainment produced Dredd, which was released in September 2012. It was positively received by critics with Rotten Tomatoes' rating of 80%. It was directed by Pete Travis and written by Alex Garland. Michael S. Murphey was co-producer with Travis. Karl Urban was cast as Judge Dredd and Olivia Thirlby portrayed Judge Anderson. Dredd's costume was radically redesigned for the film, adding armor plates and reducing the size and prominence of the shoulder insignia.

The main Judge Dredd writer John Wagner said:

It's high-octane, edge of the seat stuff, and gives a far truer representation of Dredd than the first movie.

The film was shot in 3-D and filmed in Cape Town and Johannesburg. Funding was secured from Reliance Big Entertainment.

==== Third film attempt ====
In 2025, it was reported that a new film adaptation of Judge Dredd was in development. Taika Waititi (Thor: Ragnarok and Jojo Rabbit) will direct while Drew Pearce (Iron Man 3 and Mission: Impossible – Rogue Nation) will write the screenplay.

=== Television ===
In March 1995, it was reported that an animated adaptation of Judge Dredd was being developed for release following the 1995 film to potentially air during the 1996-97 television season.

On 10 May 2017, Entertainment Weekly announced that independent entertainment studio IM Global and Rebellion have partnered to develop a live-action TV show called Judge Dredd: Mega-City One. The show is planned to be an ensemble drama about a team of Judges as they deal with the challenges of the future-shocked 22nd century.

Jason Kingsley, owner of Rebellion, told the Guardian in May 2017 that the TV show will be far more satirical than the film adaptions and could become "one of the most expensive TV shows the UK has ever seen".

According to Karl Urban, the studio's concept is to "build the show around more rookie judges and young, new judges", where Dredd himself "would come in and out". Urban stated that he would be interested in reprising the role for this, on the condition that Dredd's part of the story be implemented in a "meaningful way".

In November 2018, Rebellion began setting up a new studio in Didcot, Oxfordshire, valued at $100 million, for Film and TV series based on 2000 AD characters, including Judge Dredd: Mega City One.

=== Novels ===
From 1993 to 1995, Virgin Books published nine Judge Dredd novels. In August 2015, these novels were re-released as e-books. The books are:

- Deathmasques (Dave Stone, August 1993 ISBN 0-352-32873-8)
- The Savage Amusement (David Bishop, August 1993 ISBN 0-352-32874-6)
- Dreddlocked (Stephen Marley, October 1993 ISBN 0-352-32875-4)
- Cursed Earth Asylum (David Bishop, December 1993 ISBN 0-352-32893-2)
- The Medusa Seed (Dave Stone, January 1994 ISBN 0-352-32895-9)
- Dread Dominion (Stephen Marley, May 1994 ISBN 0-352-32929-7)
- The Hundredfold Problem (John Grant, August 1994 ISBN 0-352-32942-4) (Re-released by BeWrite Books in 2003, rewritten as a non-Dredd novel.)
- Silencer (David Bishop, November 1994 ISBN 0-352-32960-2)
- Wetworks (Dave Stone, February 1995 ISBN 0-352-32975-0)

Also in 1995, St. Martin's Press published two novelizations of the film:

- Judge Dredd (Neal Barrett Jr., June 1995 ISBN 0-312-95628-2)
- Judge Dredd: The Junior Novelisation (Graham Marks, May 1995 ISBN 0-7522-0671-0)

In 1997, Virgin published a Doctor Who novel by Dave Stone which had originally been intended to feature Judge Dredd, called Burning Heart. However this idea was abandoned after the film was released, and Dredd was replaced by another character called Adjudicator Joseph Craator.

From 2003 to 2007, Black Flame published official 2000 AD novels, including a new run of Judge Dredd novels. After Black Flame closed in 2007, Rebellion picked up the rights to their "2000 AD" titles in 2011, and began republishing them as e-books. Their nine Judge Dredd books are:

- Dredd Vs Death (Gordon Rennie, October 2003 ISBN 1-84416-061-0)
- Bad Moon Rising (David Bishop, June 2004 ISBN 1-84416-107-2)
- Black Atlantic (Peter J. Evans & Simon Jowett, June 2004 ISBN 1-84416-108-0)
- Eclipse (James Swallow, August 2004 ISBN 1-84416-122-6)
- Kingdom of the Blind (David Bishop, November 2004 ISBN 1-84416-133-1)
- The Final Cut (Matt Smith, February 2005 ISBN 1-84416-135-8)
- Swine Fever (Andrew Cartmel, May 2005 ISBN 1-84416-174-9)
- Whiteout (James Swallow, September 2005 ISBN 1-84416-219-2)
- Psykogeddon (Dave Stone, January 2006 ISBN 1-84416-321-0)

In July 2012, three of these novels – Gordon Rennie's Dredd Vs Death, David Bishop's Kingdom of the Blind, and Matt Smith's The Final Cut – were republished in a single paperback volume titled Dredd, as a tie-in with the 2012 film of the same title. (ISBN 9781781080771)

In August 2012, Rebellion announced a new series of e-books under the series title Judge Dredd: Year One, about Dredd's first year as a judge (the stories in the comic strip having begun in his 20th year when he was already a veteran). All three stories were published by Abaddon Books in a paperback book called Judge Dredd Year One Omnibus in October 2014.

- City Fathers (Matthew Smith, August 2012)
- The Cold Light of Day (Michael Carroll, July 2014)
- Wear Iron (Al Ewing, October 2014)

In 2016 and 2017, more e-books were published under the series title Judge Dredd: Year Two:

- The Righteous Man (Michael Carroll, January 2016)
- Down and Out (Matthew Smith, September 2016)
- Alternative Facts (Cavan Scott, October 2017)

In 2020, more e-books were published under the series title Judge Dredd: Year Three:

- Fallen Angel (Michael Carroll)
- Machineries of Hate (Matthew Smith)
- Bitter Earth (Lauren Sills)

==== Novels about related characters ====
As well as novels starring Judge Dredd, there are other novels and novellas in the franchise about other characters. For a list of books about Anderson, see Judge Anderson#Novels.

Michael Carroll wrote three novellas about Dredd's brother, Rico Dredd, under the series title Rico Dredd: The Titan Years. They were originally published as e-books, but the trilogy was published in an omnibus paperback volume by Abaddon Books in 2019.

- The Third Law (June 2014)
- The Process of Elimination (October 2018)
- For I Have Sinned (March 2019)

Another series of books, collectively called Judges, is about the first generation of judges, and are set six decades before Dredd's first stories to appear in the comic. The books, all published by Abaddon Books, are:

- The Avalanche (Michael Carroll, May 2018)
- When the Light Lay Still (Charles J. Eskew, August 2018)
- Lone Wolf (George Mann, January 2019)
- Golgotha (Michael Carroll, July 2019)
- Psyche (Maura McHugh, January 2020)
- The Patriots (Joseph Elliott-Coleman, March 2020)
- Necessary Evil (Michael Carroll, July 2021)
- What Measure Ye Mete (C.E. Murphy, August 2021)
- (In)famous (Zina Hutton, November 2021)

These books were later republished in three omnibus volumes.

A trilogy about the Dark Judges, The Fall of Deadworld, was written by 2000 AD's editor, Matt Smith, and published by Abaddon Books:

- Red Mosquito (September 2019)
- Bone White Seeds (February 2020)
- Grey Flesh Flies (April 2020)

These were collected into an omnibus edition in June 2020.

A trilogy of novellas called The Apocalypse War, all written by John Ware, was released in 2022:

- "Pack Instinct"
- "The World Will End Today"
- "The Bloody Fist of Justice"

These were collected in an omnibus edition called Apocalypse War Dossier.

==== Other books ====
- Judge Fear's Big Day Out and Other Stories (2020), a collection of short stories by various writers which originally appeared in the Judge Dredd Megazine, edited by Michael Carroll.

=== Games ===
==== Video games ====
There have been multiple Judge Dredd games released for various video game consoles and several home computers such as the ZX Spectrum, PlayStation and Commodore 64. The first game, titled Judge Dredd, was released in 1986. Another game, also titled Judge Dredd, was released in 1990. At one time, an arcade game was being developed by Midway Games but it was never released. It can however be found online and has three playable levels.

A game loosely based on the first live action film, called Judge Dredd was developed by Probe Software and released by Acclaim for the Genesis, Super Nintendo Entertainment System, Game Boy, and Game Gear. Bally produced a Judge Dredd pinball machine based on the comics. In 1997, Acclaim released a Judge Dredd arcade game, a rail shooter with 3D graphics and full motion video footage shot specifically for the game.

Judge Dredd: Dredd Vs. Death was produced by Rebellion Developments and released in early 2003 by Sierra Entertainment for Microsoft Windows, PlayStation 2, Xbox, and GameCube. The game sees the return of the Dark Judges when Mega-City One becomes overrun with vampires and the undead. The player takes control of Judge Dredd, with the optional addition of another Human player in co-operative play. The game is a first-person shooter – with key differences such as the requirement to arrest lawbreakers, and an SJS death squad which will hunt down Dredd should the player kill too many civilians. The player can also go up against three friends in the various multiplayer modes which include "Deathmatch", "Team Deathmatch", "Elimination", "Team Elimination", "Informant", "Judges Vs. Perps", "Runner" and more. A novel was based on the game.

A costume set for the PlayStation 3 video game LittleBigPlanet was released in May 2009, which contained outfits to dress the game's main character Sackboy as five 2000 AD characters, one of which is Judge Dredd. Dredd's uniform is also used to create the Judge Anderson costume for the Sackpeople.

In 2012, Rebellion released Judge Dredd Vs. Zombies, a game application for iPhone, Android phones, Windows 8 and Windows Phone.

==== Role-playing games ====
Games Workshop released a Judge Dredd role-playing game in 1985. Mongoose Publishing released The Judge Dredd Roleplaying Game in 2002 and another Judge Dredd game using the Traveller system in 2009. Their licence ended in 2016. In February 2017, EN Publishing announced the new Judge Dredd & The Worlds of 2000 AD Tabletop Adventure Game using the WOIN (What's OLD is NEW) role-playing game system.

On 17 July 2012, Tin Man Games released a Judge Dredd-themed digital role-playing gamebook titled Judge Dredd: Countdown Sector 106, available for the iOS operating system.

==== Board games ====
Games Workshop produced a Judge Dredd board game based on the comic strip in 1982. In the game players, who represent judges, attempt to arrest perps that have committed crimes in different location in Mega City One. A key feature of the game is the different action cards that are collected during play; generally these cards are used when trying to arrest perps although some cards can also be played against other players to hinder their progress. The winner of the game is the judge who collected the most points arresting perps. Players could sabotage each other's arrest attempts. Additionally, there were many amusing card combinations such as arresting Judge Death for selling old comics, as the Old Comic Selling crime card featured a 2000 AD cover with Judge Death on it. The game used characters, locations and artwork from the comic. It was re-released by Rebellion in 2022.

In 1987, Games Workshop published a second Dredd-inspired board game, "Block Mania". In this game for two players, players take on the role of rival neighboring blocks at war. This was a heavier game than the earlier Dredd board game, focused on tactical combat, in which players control these residents as they use whatever means they can to vandalize and destroy their opponent's block. Later the same year, Games Workshop released the Mega-Mania expansion for the game, allowing the game to be played by up to four players.

Mongoose Publishing have released a miniatures skirmish game of gang warfare based in Mega-City One called "Gangs of Mega-City One", often referred to as GOMC1. The game features judges being called in when a gang challenges another gang that is too tough to fight. A wide range of miniatures has been released including box sets for an Ape Gang and an Undercity Gang. A Robot Gang was also produced but was released as two blister packs instead of a box set. Only one rules expansion has been released, called "Death on the Streets". The expansion introduced many new rules including usage of the new gangs and the ability to bring Judge Dredd himself into a fight. This game went out of print shortly thereafter, but was replaced by the "Judge Dredd Miniatures Game", which was published free in many stages as the company sought feedback from fans and players. In 2012, an expansion was released called "Block War!". Miniatures continue to be manufactured at a slow pace.

In November 2017, Osprey Games announced their development of a new graphic adventure card game, entitled Judge Dredd: The Cursed Earth. The game is designed and based on The Lost Expedition, a game from designer Peer Sylvester. In the game, one to five players "[lead] a team of judges against dinosaurs, mutants, and the Cursed Earth itself". It was released on 21 February 2019.

A virtual pinball table based on the series was released for Pinball FX in October 2026.

==== Collectible card game ====
There was a short-lived collectible card game called simply "Dredd". In the game, players would control a squad of judges and arrest perps. The rules system was innovative and the game was well-received by fans and collectors alike, but various issues unrelated to the game's quality caused its early demise.

==== Pinball ====
There was a four-player pinball game released in 1993, produced by Bally Manufacturing.

=== Audio series ===
"The Day the Law Died" and "The Apocalypse War" stories were produced by Dirk Maggs and broadcast in three-minute segments (40 for each story) on Mark Goodier's afternoon show on BBC Radio One in 1995. The cast include Lorelei King and Gary Martin. They were issued separately on dual cassette and double CD. Both titles have since been deleted. "The Apocalypse War" also contains plot elements from "Block Mania", because this story set the scene for the main story.

Since then, Big Finish Productions has produced 18 audio plays featuring 2000 AD characters. These have mostly featured Judge Dredd, although three have also featured characters from the series Strontium Dog. In these, Judge Dredd is played by Toby Longworth, and Johnny Alpha from Strontium Dog is played by Simon Pegg.

The list of 2000 AD audio plays featuring Dredd includes:

1. Judge Dredd: Wanted: Dredd or Alive by David Bishop
2. Judge Dredd: Death Trap! by David Bishop
3. Judge Dredd: The Killing Zone by Dave Stone
4. Judge Dredd: The Big Shot! by David Bishop
5. Judge Dredd: Trapped on Titan by Jonathan Clements
6. Judge Dredd: Get Karter! by David Bishop
7. Judge Dredd: I Love Judge Dredd by Jonathan Morris
8. Judge Dredd: Dreddline by James Swallow
9. Judge Dredd: 99 Code Red! by Jonathan Clements
10. Judge Dredd: War Planet by Dave Stone
11. Judge Dredd: Jihad by James Swallow
12. Judge Dredd: War Crimes by David Bishop
13. Judge Dredd: For King and Country by Cavan Scott
14. Judge Dredd: Pre-Emptive Revenge by Jonathan Clements (with Strontium Dog)
15. Judge Dredd: Grud is Dead by James Swallow
16. Judge Dredd: Solo by Jonathan Clements

Note: 3 and 10 are Strontium Dog stories that do not feature Dredd.

Starting in 2009, four further Judge Dredd titles were released under the banner "Crime Chronicles", once more featuring Toby Longworth.

1. Judge Dredd: Crime Chronicles – Stranger Than Truth by David Bishop (October 2009)
2. Judge Dredd: Crime Chronicles – Blood Will Tell by James Swallow (November 2009)
3. Judge Dredd: Crime Chronicles – The Devil's Playground by Jonathan Clements (December 2009)
4. Judge Dredd: Crime Chronicles – Double Zero by James Swallow (January 2010)

== Musical homages ==
- The metal band Anthrax included a song about Judge Dredd on their third album (Among the Living) entitled "I Am the Law". It is one of their most popular and well-known songs, and often features as an encore to setlists. They also released a 12" single and a 7" picture disc, both bearing the image of Dredd. One 12" version featured a fold-out poster of the band dressed as Judges drawn by drummer Charlie Benante.
- The UK ska/pop band Madness recorded a tribute single to Dredd under the name of The Fink Brothers, entitled "Mutants in Mega-City One". Released on the Zarjazz label in February 1985, the record featured a cover drawn by 2000 AD Dredd artist Brian Bolland.

== See also ==
- 2000 AD crossovers. Judge Dredd's timeline has crossed over with many other 2000 AD stories.
