= 2010 in comics =

Notable events of 2010 in comics. It includes any relevant comics-related events, deaths of notable comics-related people, conventions and first issues by title.

== Events ==
=== January ===
- January 1: In Mad, the final episode of the long-running humor series Monroe is printed.
- January 4: Steve Kelley and Jeff Parker's Dustin makes its debut.
- January 12: Dutch cartoonist Jos Collignon wins the Inktspotprijs for Best Political Cartoon (edition 2009).
- January 22: The final Valérian and Laureline album L'OuvreTemps, is published by Pierre Christin and Jean-Claude Mézières.
- January 26: British TV host Jonathan Ross releases Turf, a comic book scripted by him and drawn by Tommy Lee Edwards.

=== February ===
- February 18: Jim Lee and Dan DiDio announced as the new co-publishers of DC Comics, replacing Paul Levitz.
- February 26: In the Netherlands, the Marten Toonderprijs is awarded for the first time. Jan Kruis is the first winner.

=== March ===
- March 1: The first episode of Brett Koth's Diamond Lil appears in print.

=== April ===
- April 20: Cartoonist Molly Norris creates the Everybody Draw Mohammed Day cartoon, in response to the controversy over the South Park episodes 200 and 201 (South Park). She gets involved in a media frenzy, with death threats and her name eventually appearing on Al-Qaeda's hitlist for people deemed acceptable for assassination. Since then she kept a low profile.
- April 29: Dutch comics artists Bert Bus and Nico van Dam are knighted in the Order of Orange-Nassau.

=== May ===
- May 25: The final episode of Jonas Geirnaert's Kabouter Wesley is published in Humo.
- May 29: In Gouda, The Netherlands, a museum dedicated to Hans G. Kresse opens its doors.

=== June ===
- June 7: The first episode of Gene Weingarten, Dan Weingarten and David Clark's Barney & Clyde is published.
- June 11: Hiromu Arakawa's series Fullmetal Alchemist is concluded.
- June 13: The final episode of Little Orphan Annie appears in newspapers, ending the long-running series afer 86 years.

=== July ===
- July 18: Publication of the first issue of the Kodansha shōjo manga magazine Aria.

=== September ===
- September 9: The play Cheapjack Shakespeare, based on the comic of the same name, debuts in Buffalo, New York.
- September 20: The first episode of Ed Stein's newspaper gag comic Freshly Squeezed appears in print. The series will run until 2014.
- September 25–26: During the Stripdagen in Houten, the Netherlands, Jesse van Muylwijck wins the Stripschapprijs. Ger van Wulften wins the P. Hans Frankfurtherprijs. Rupert van der Linden wins the Bulletje en Boonestaakschaal during the same event.

=== October ===
- October 3: Cathy Guisewite's newspaper gag comic Cathy comes to a close after 34 years of syndication. In the final episode, Cathy reveals to her parents that she is pregnant with a girl.
- October 4: The first episode of Paul Trap's Thatababy is published.
- October 31: The final episode of Bill Hinds' Cleats is printed.

=== November ===
- November 11: In an episode of Garfield, a spider about to be swatted by Garfield explains that after his death he'll be remembered by fellow spiders in a remembrance day titled "National Stupid Day", referring to Garfield. The comic is published on Veterans Day, which leads to many angry reader's letters. Cartoonist Jim Davis issues an official apology, explaining the unfortunate publication coincidence.
- November 25: On the same day the characters Oswald the Lucky Rabbit and his girlfriend Ortensia the cat are integrated in the Mickey Mouse universe through the video game Epic Mickey, the two characters also debut in Disney comics, namely two stories for the European market by Peter David and Claudio Sciarrone (Clocktower Cleaners and The Rubbish Cup).

=== December ===
- DC Comics shuts down its WildStorm imprint.

=== Specific date unknown ===
- Julia Gfrörer publishes her graphic novel Flesh and Bone.
- The Digital Comic Museum is founded.
- The Stan Lee Foundation for literacy is created.
- Bongo Comics drops the Comics Code Authority seal.
- The final episode of Seung-Jin Park and Kim Jung Gi's webcomic TLT - Tiger the Long Tail is published.

== Deaths ==
=== January ===
- January 2: Marion Hull Hammel, American art teacher, illustrator and comics artist (continued Goofus and Gallant), dies at age 87.
- January 3: Tibet (aka Gilbert Gascard), French comics artist (Chick Bill, Ric Hochet)), dies at age 78.
- January 3: Barry Blair, Canadian comics artist (Aircel Comics) dies at age 55.
- January 21: Jacques Martin, French comics artist (The Adventures of Alix, Lefranc), dies at age 88.
- January 25: Bill Ritchie, American comics artist (Baby Crockett and Sweet Sue), dies at age 78.
- January 26: John Dirks, American comics artist (continued The Captain and the Kids), dies at age 92.

=== February ===
- February 4: Te Wei, Chinese comics artist and animator (The Proud General), dies at age 94.
- February 11: Marvin Stein, American comics artist, animator and illustrator (Captain Valiant, Superboy, Funnyman), dies at age 85.
- February 18: Fernando Krahn, Chilean artist, animator, illustrator and comics artist, dies at age 75.
- February 19: Jerry Grandenetti, American comics artist (assisted on The Spirit, worked on Rip Tide, co-creator of Prez), dies at age 83.
- February 25: Virgilio Muzzi, Italian comic artist (worked on Tex Willer), dies at age 76.
- February 26: Violet Barclay, American comics artist (Rusty, Super Rabbit), dies at age 87.

=== March ===
- March 6: Don Sherwood, American comics artist (Dan Flagg, Charlton Comics, The Flintstones newspaper comic strip, the comic strip adaptation of Dick Clark's Rock, Roll & Remember), dies at age 79.
- March 11: Turhan Selçuk, Turkish cartoonist (Abdul Canbaz), dies at age 87.
- March 12: Timo Aarniala, Finnish comics artist (Cauchemar) and film director, dies at age 64.
- March 12: Glauco Villas Boas, Brazilian comics artist, illustrator, rock artist and religious leader (Geraldão), is murdered at age 52.
- March 19: John Hicklenton, British comics artist (Nemesis the Warlock), commits euthanasia at age 42 after suffering from multiple sclerosis.
- March 27:
  - José Antunes, Portuguese comics artist (realistically-drawn adventure comics in the magazine O Mundo de Aventuras), dies at age 72.
  - Dick Giordano, American comics artist (Charlton Comics, DC Comics) dies at age 77.

=== April ===
- April 4: Henry Scarpelli, American comics artist (Archie Comics), dies at age 79.
- April 15: Bill DuBay, American horror comics editor, writer, and artist, dies at age 62.
- April 27: Kees Kousemaker, Dutch comics store owner (the Amsterdam comics store Lambiek), publisher (Les Editions Lambiek), writer, scholar (the encyclopedias Strip voor Strip, Wordt Vervolgd. Striplexicon der Lage Landen and De Wereld van de Nederlandse Strip) and establisher of the online encyclopedia Comiclopedia, dies at age 68.

=== May ===
- May 1: Pierre Stora, AKA Espé, French cartoonist, dies at age 66.
- May 3: Peter O'Donnell, British comics writer (Garth, Romeo Brown, Modesty Blaise), dies at age 90.
- May 10: Frank Frazetta, American comics artist and illustrator (Thun'da, King of the Congo, White Indian, The Shining Knight), dies at age 82.
- May 15: Juan José Carbo Gatignol, Spanish comics artist (Robustiano Fortachón, El Penado 113, Ivanchito), dies at age 83.
- May 16: Philippe Bertrand, French comics artist (Linda Aime L'Art), dies at age 61
- May 22: Howard Post, American comics artist (Harvey Comics) dies at age 83.
- May 23: Roy Mitchell, British comic artist (Project Pete, God Is..., The Chalks and the Cheeses), dies at age 63 or 64.
- May 25: Gabriel Vargas, Mexican comics artist (Los Superlocos, La Familia Burrón), dies at age 95.
- May 28: Otello Scarpelli, Italian comic artist (Dev Bardai, comics based on Ivanhoe), dies at age 71.
- May 29: Philippe Josse, aka Barberousse, French comics artist (Tonic), dies at age 89.
- May 31: Coq Scheltens-Jongkind, Dutch politician, illustrator and comics artist (Scoutertje, Dikkie), dies at age 67.

=== June ===
- June 2: Tony DiPreta, American comics artist (assisted on Mickey Finn, continued Joe Palooka and Rex Morgan, M.D.) dies at age 88.
- June 2: Antonio Parras, Spanish comics artist (Les Inoxyables), dies at age 81
- June 12: Al Williamson, American comics artist and inker (EC Comics, continued Flash Gordon), dies at age 79.
- June 13: Hua Junwu, Chinese comics artist, dies at age 95.
- June 19: Ken Muse, American cartoonist and comics artist (Wayout), dies at age 75.
- June 23: Joe Messerli, American comics artist (made comics for Western Publishing), dies at age 79 or 80.
- June 25: Valentin Rozantsev, Russian cartoonist and comics artist (drew comics for the magazine Misha), dies at age 70.
- June 28:
  - Lloyd Birmingham, American illustrator and comics artist (The Handy Family, Helen Homemaker), dies at age 85.
  - Annette Tison, French novelist and illustrator (Barbapapa), dies at age 77.

=== July ===
- July 2:
  - Víctor de la Fuente, Spanish comics writer and artist (Haxtur, Sunday, Mathai-Dor, Mortimer, Amargo, Haggarth, Los Gringos, continued Tex Willer), dies at age 83.
  - Antonio Parras, Spanish comic artist (Ian MacDonald, La Lièvre de Mars, Le Méridien des Brumes), dies at age 81.
- July 12: Harvey Pekar, American comics writer (American Splendor), dies at age 70.
- July 12: Tuli Kupferberg, American rock musician, poet, activist and cartoonist, dies at age 86.
- July 24: John Callahan, American cartoonist, dies at age 59.

=== August ===
- August 6: Ted Rawlings, British comics artist (made comics for DC Thomson), dies at age 79.
- August 12: André Harvec, A.K.A. André Hervé, French comic artist (Les Aventures Sportives de Freluquet, Bob Flapi, Athlète Complet, Monsieur Bidulet, Alban, Célibataire Endurci), dies at age 92.
- August 16: Peter Wienk, Dutch comics artist, illustrator and painter (Nikkie, Noddy), dies at age 89.
- August 24: Satoshi Kon, Japanese manga artist and animator (Opus), dies at age 46 from pancreatic cancer.
- August 28: Roger Mas, French comics artist (Léo Bète à Part, continued Pif le chien), dies at age 86.

=== September ===
- September 10: Paul Conrad, American political cartoonist, dies at age 86.
- September 19: Stuart Hample, American playwright, children's book author, cartoonist and comics artist (Inside Woody Allen), dies at age 84.
- September 28: Dani Aguila, Philippine comics artist (Barrio Breeze, The Cock and Bull), dies at age 82.
- Specific date unknown: Bob Gibson, British caricaturist and comics artist (The text comic adaptation of Magical Mystery Tour), dies at age 71 or 72.

=== October ===
- October 6: Piet Wijn, Dutch comics artist (Frank de Vliegende Hollander, Douwe Dabbert), dies at age 81.
- October 9: Jim Seed, American comics artist and illustrator (Dr. Guy Bennett, Jane Arden), dies at age 83.
- October 24: Mike Esposito, American comics artist (Marvel Comics, DC Comics) dies at age 83.
- October 25: Buth, Belgian comics artist (Thomas Pips), dies at age 91.
- October 27: Don Donahue, American comics publisher (Apex Novelties, one of the instigators of the underground comix movement), dies at age 68.

=== November ===
- November 6: Peter Vos, Dutch comics artist and illustrator (Sylvester en Sebastiaan, Meneer Miereneter), dies from cancer at age 75.
- November 7: Max Emanuel Gruder, aka Burschi, Romanian illustrator and comic artist, dies at age 82.
- November 25:
  - Lou Cameron, American illustrator, comics writer and artist (worked for Classics Illustrated), dies at age 86.
  - Michel Douay, French comics artist, illustrator and animator (Séraphine, Zoé Enfant).

=== December ===
- December 8: Onno Docters van Leeuwen, Dutch graphic designer and illustrator (made designs for the Amsterdam comic shop Lambiek), dies at age 69.
- December 12: Marc Henniquiau, Kio, Belgian comics artist (worked on The Adventures of Alix), dies at age 52.

=== Specific date unknown ===
- Andre Harvec, French comics artist (Monsieur Bidulet, Mademoiselle Bidulette, Bob Flapi, athlète complete, Alban, Célibataire endurci, Monsieur et Madame Esso), dies at age 91 or 92.

== Exhibitions ==
- February 25 – May 30: Whitney Biennial, Whitney Museum of American Art (New York City) — features art by Robert Williams
- March 12–May 30: "NeoIntegrity: Comics Edition," Museum of Comic and Cartoon Art (New York City) — featuring the work 210 artists, "flattening the hierarchy that separates art from cartooning," including Al Capp, Charles M. Schulz, Peter Saul, Dana Schutz, and John Wesley; curated by Keith Mayerson
- May 1–June 6: "Super! The Fine Art of Comics," Twenty-Two lounge/gallery (Charlotte, North Carolina) — curated by Shelton Drum, with original art by (among others) Steve Ditko, Adam Hughes, Brian Stelfreeze, Michael Golden, Joe Jusko, Cully Hamner, Mark Brooks, and Mark Texeira
- September 7, 2010 – January 2, 2011: "Ireland of the Dispatch" (part of the Festival of Cartoon Art) (Thompson Library Gallery, Ohio State University, Columbus, Ohio) — Billy Ireland retrospective
- September 7–December 31: "Scenes of My Infint-hood: Celebrating the Birth of Krazy Kat" (part of the Festival of Cartoon Art) (Billy Ireland Cartoon Library & Museum Reading Room Gallery, Ohio State University, Columbus, Ohio)
- October 1, 2010 – January 30, 2011: "Graphic Details: Confessional Comics by Jewish Women", Cartoon Art Museum (San Francisco, California) — curated by Michael Kaminer and Sarah Lightman, featuring Vanessa Davis, Bernice Eisenstein, Sarah Glidden, Miriam Katin, Miss Lasko-Gross, Sarah Lazarovic, Miriam Libicki, Sarah Lightman, Diane Noomin, Corinne Pearlman, Trina Robbins, Rachell Rottner, Sharon Rudahl, Laurie Sandell, Ariel Schrag, Lauren Weinstein, and Ilana Zeffren. Show later traveled to New York; Toronto; Washington, DC; Miami Beach; Portland, Oregon; and Columbus, Ohio.
- October 8, 2010 – January 6, 2011: "The Bible Illuminated: R. Crumb's Book of Genesis" (part of the Festival of Cartoon Art) (Columbus Museum of Art, Columbus, Ohio) — work from Robert Crumb's The Book of Genesis adaptation
- December 2, 2010 – January 2, 2011: "Spacenight2: A Tribute to Bill Mantlo", Floating World Comics (Portland, Oregon) — a fundraiser exhibition and auction of Rom the Spaceknight illustrations, by such creators as Mike Allred, Jeffrey Brown, Michael DeForge, Tan Eng Huat, Jon Schnepp, and Matt Timson
- December 7, 2010 – February 5, 2011: "Graphic Radicals" (Exit Art, New York City) — work from World War 3 Illustrated, curated by Peter Kuper, Seth Tobocman, and Susan Willmarth

== Conventions ==
- January 28–31: Angoulême International Comics Festival (Angoulême, France)
- January 30–31: Dallas Comic Con 14 (Richardson Civic Center, Richardson, Texas, US) — guests include Tim Sale, Adam Hughes, Todd Nauck, Brad W. Foster, Ben Dunn, Michael Golden, Harold LeDoux, Cal Slayton, and many more
- February 5–6: What the Hell?! Con (Greensboro, North Carolina)
- March 6: STAPLE! (Monarch Event Center, Austin, Texas, US)
- March 12–14: MegaCon (Orange County Convention Center, Orlando, Florida, US) — guests include Marv Wolfman, George Pérez, Lea Thompson, Claudia Wells, Nichelle Nichols, Jeremy Bulloch, and Peter Mayhew
- March 13–14: Emerald City ComiCon (Washington State Convention & Trade Center, Seattle, Washington, US) — 20,000 attendees; guests: Joe Quesada, Geoff Johns, Brian Azzarello, Jhonen Vasquez, Brian Michael Bendis, Mike Allred, Whilce Portacio, James Robinson, Doug Mahnke, Joe Kelly, Duncan Rouleau, Matt Kindt, Steve Rolston, G. Willow Wilson, Colleen Coover, Aaron Lopresti, Tim Bradstreet, Joe Casey, Steven T. Seagle, J. H. Williams III, Tim Sale, Alex Maleev, Kurt Busiek, Timothy Green II, Jim Rugg, David Hahn, Chris Roberson, Christina Strain, Paul Tobin, David Mack, Michael Golden, Brandon Jerwa, Jo Chen, Ed Brubaker, Darick Robertson, Rick Remender, Matt Fraction, Steve Lieber, Jeff Parker, Brandon Graham, Jason Pearson, Sterling Gates, Mike Norton, Dave Stewart, Mark Texeira, Kevin Maguire, John Layman, Dave Kellett, Ryan Ottley, C. B. Cebulski, Phil Hester, Michael Avon Oeming, Dustin Nguyen, Terry Moore, Pete Tomasi, Clayton Crain, Ben McCool, Richard Starkings, Philip Tan, Jeff Lemire, Scott Kurtz, Jill Thompson, Andy Runton, Aaron Lopresti, Barry Kitson, Greg Rucka, Josh Ortega, Ben Templesmith, Scott Allie, J.J. Kirby, Steve Sadowski, Kris Straub, Brian Haberlin, Brad Guigar, Eric Basaldua, Len Wein, Michael Broussard, Tim Seeley, and Mark Waid
- March 26–28: Wizard World Toronto (Direct Energy Centre, Hall A, Toronto, Ontario, Canada) — first iteration of Wizard's acquisition of the Toronto Comicon
- March 27–28: Hi-Ex (Eden Court Theatre, Inverness, Scotland) — guests include Charlie Adlard, Asia Alfasi, Gary Erskine, Simon Fraser, John Higgins, Cam Kennedy, Gary Northfield, and Kev F. Sutherland
- March 27: UK Web & Mini Comix Thing (Great Hall, Queen Mary University of London, Mile End, London, UK) — exhibitors include Roger Langridge
- April 2–4: WonderCon (San Francisco, US)
- April 10–11: MoCCA Festival (69th Regiment Armory, New York City, US)
- April 16–18: Chicago Comic & Entertainment Expo (C2E2) (Chicago, Illinois, US) — inaugural event; 20,000–30,000 attendees
- April 17: FLUKE Mini-Comics & Zine Festival (Ciné, Athens, Georgia)
- April 23–25: Pittsburgh Comicon (Monroeville Convention Center, Monroeville, Pennsylvania, US) — guests include Roy Thomas, Gene Colan, Joe Sinnott, Ernie Chan, Herb Trimpe, Gary Friedrich, Talent Caldwell, Eric Basaldua, Margot Kidder, and Camden Toy
- April 24–25: Small Press and Alternative Comics Expo (S.P.A.C.E.) (Ramada Plaza Hotel & Conference Center, Columbus, Ohio)
- April 24–25: Stumptown Comics Fest (Lloyd Center Doubletree, Portland, Oregon)
- May 8–9: Toronto Comic Arts Festival (Toronto Reference Library, Toronto, Canada)
- May 14–16: Motor City Comic Con (Rock Financial Showplace, Novi, Michigan, US) — guests include Linda Blair, Lindsay Wagner, and Adam West
- May 14–15: East Coast Black Age of Comics Convention (Philadelphia, Pennsylvania) — guests include Eric Battle, Reggie Byers, Shawn Martinbrough, and Larry Stroman
- May 22–23: Comic Expo (Ramada and Mercure hotels, Bristol, UK) — 1,000+ attendees; guests include Richard Starkings, Kieron Gillen, Paul Grist, Charlie Adlard, and Ian Churchill.
- May 28–30: Adventure Con (Pigeon Forge Convention Center, Grand Hotel, Pigeon Forge, Tennessee) — featured guest of honor: Gary Friedrich
- May 28–30: Phoenix Comicon (Phoenix, Arizona)
- May 28–30: Rockin' Pasadena Comic Con (Pasadena, California) — guests include Stan Lee
- June 4–6: Heroes Convention (Charlotte Convention Center, Charlotte, North Carolina, US) — guests include Bob Almond, Mark Bagley, Liz Baillie, Kate Beaton, John Beatty, Christian Beranek, Brian Bolland, Mark Brooks, Richard Case, Bernard Chang, Sean Chen, Cliff Chiang, Frank Cho, Colleen Coover, Jeremy Dale, Guy Davis, Vito Delsante, Evan Dorkin, Sarah Dyer, Nathan Edmondson, Tommy Lee Edwards, Tom Fowler, Francesco Francavilla, Gary Friedrich, Christos Gage, John Gallagher, Michael Golden, Meredith Gran, Keron Grant, Cully Hamner, Scott Hampton, Tony Harris, Christopher Hastings, Clayton Henry, Adam Hughes, Jamal Igle, Matt Kindt, Roger Langridge, Jason Latour, John Paul Leon, Rick Leonardi, Alec Longstreth, Laura Martin, Nathan Massengill, Mike McKone, Christopher Moeller, Sean Gordon Murphy, Dustin Nguyen, Ryan North, Mike Norton, Phil Noto, James O'Barr, Dan Parent, Brandon Peterson, Ed Piskor, Dave Roman, Budd Root, Don Rosa, Stéphane Roux, Jim Rugg, Chris Samnee, Jim Scancarelli, Tom Spurgeon, Joe Staton, Brian Stelfreeze, Karl Story, Raina Telgemeier, Ben Templesmith, Mark Texeira, Jill Thompson, William Tucci, Ethan Van Sciver, Noah Van Sciver, Dexter Vines, Michael W. Watkins, Bill Willingham, Skottie Young, and Chrissie Zullo
- June 5–6: Toronto ComiCON Fan Appreciation Event (Metro Toronto Convention Centre, Toronto, Ontario, Canada)
- July 17–18: London Film and Comic Con (Earls Court Exhibition Centre, London, England, UK)
- July 22–25: Comic-Con International (San Diego, US) — 130,000+ attendees; guests: Neal Adams, Josh Adams, Sergio Aragonés, Peter Bagge, Gabrielle Bell, Brian Michael Bendis, Ray Bradbury, Émile Bravo, Berkeley Breathed, Kurt Busiek, Chris Claremont, Howard Cruse, Vanessa Davis, Felicia Day, Samuel R. Delany, Dave Dorman, Mark Evanier, Jon Favreau, Matt Fraction, Hunter Freberg, Stan Freberg, Nicholas Gurewitch, Moto Hagio, Charlaine Harris, Tanya Huff, Kathryn Immonen, Stuart Immonen, Phil Jimenez, Jenette Kahn, Keith Knight, Jim Lee, Stan Lee, Paul Levitz, Milo Manara, Larry Marder, Carla Speed McNeil, China Miéville, Dennis O'Neil, Robert M. Overstreet, Tom Palmer, Sean Phillips, Ivan Reis, Douglas E. Richards, Rick Riordan, Jerry Robinson, Steve Rude, Jeannie Schulz, J. Michael Straczynski, Drew Struzan, James Sturm, Jillian Tamaki, Doug TenNapel, C. Tyler, Ann VanderMeer, Jeff VanderMeer, Gerard Way, Al Wiesner, Michael Zulli, and more
- July 31–August 1: CAPTION: "Mad Science" (East Oxford Community Centre, Oxford, England, UK)
- August 19–22: Wizard World Chicago (Rosemont, Illinois, US) — guests: William Shatner, Linda Hamilton, James Marsters, Linda Blair, Nicholas Brendon, Clare Kramer, Claudia Christian, Richard Roundtree, Julia Jones, Joe Madureira, Michael Golden, Arthur Suydam, Brian Pulido, and David Mack
- August 27–29: Fan Expo Canada (Metro Toronto Convention Centre, Toronto, Ontario, Canada) — 64,000 attendees; guests include William Shatner, Adam West, Burt Ward, Julie Newmar, James Marsters, Stan Lee, Felicia Day, Sendhil Ramamurthy, Michael Dorn, Peter Mayhew, Bruce Boxleitner, David Blue, Summer Glau, Michelle Forbes, Tahmoh Penikett, Dean Stockwell, Daniel Cudmore, Ernest Borgnine, Ryan Robbins, David Cronenberg, Lance Henriksen, Ken Russell, Bill Moseley, William Forsythe, Heather Langenkamp, El Hijo Del Santo, Sherrilyn Kenyon, Anna Silk, Charles Band, Gary Frank, Andy Kubert, Adam Kubert, Olivier Coipel, Steve McNiven, Ethan Van Sciver, Doug Mahnke, Dan DiDio, C.B. Cebulski, Brian Azzarello, Darwyn Cooke, Bob Layton, Tim Bradstreet, Alex Maleev, Ian Churchill, Jill Thompson, Jim Valentino, Chris Sprouse, Yanick Paquette, Cameron Stewart, Jeff Lemire, Yoshitaka Amano, Ogata Megumi, Vic Mignogna, Johnny Yong Bosch, Brad Swaile, Jamie Marchi, Jason Deline, Victor Lucas, Scott Jones, Tommy Tallarico, Jarett Cale, Geoff Lapaire, Ed Greenwood, Robin D. Laws, Casts of Todd and the Book of Pure Evil, Riese, Lost Girl, Dark Rising, Medium Raw: Night of the Wolf, I Spit On Your Grave, Durham County, Pure Pwnage, Electric Playground, and Reviews on the Run
- August 28–29: Baltimore Comic-Con (Baltimore Convention Center, Baltimore, Maryland, US)
- August 28–29: Dallas Comic Con 15 (Richardson Civic Center, Richardson, Texas, US) — guests include Keith Pollard, Adam Warren, Angel Medina, Pat Broderick, June Brigman, Roy Richardson, Kerry Gammill, Kez Wilson, Ben Dunn, Josh Howard, Joe Eisma, Steve Erwin, John Lucas, Brian Denham, Andre Mangum, David Hopkins, Cal Slayton, Richard Dominguez, Lawrence Reynolds, Anthony Tollin, and others
- September 3–6: Dragon Con (Hyatt Regency Atlanta/Marriott Marquis/Atlanta Hilton/Sheraton, Atlanta, Georgia, US) — 30,000+ attendees; featured guests: Stan Lee and Neal Adams, other guests include Sherilyn Kenyon, Scott Bakula, Barbara Eden, Larry Hagman, Luke Perry, Tom Savini, John Zaffis, and Donato Giancolo
- September 10–11: Small Press Expo (SPX) (Bethesda, Maryland, US)
- September 11–12: Montreal Comiccon (Place Bonaventure, Montreal, Quebec) — 8,300 attendees; guests include: Brent Spiner, Billy Dee Williams, Peter Mayhew, Ethan Van Sciver, Darick Robertson, Leonard Kirk, Herb Trimpe, Dale Eaglesham, Elvira, Mistress of the Dark, Larry Hama, Tim Sale, and Kirby Morrow
- September 14–18: Jornadas de Cómic (Avilés, Spain)
- September 25: Massachusetts Independent Comics Expo (Art Institute of Boston, Boston, Massachusetts) — first iteration of MICE, presented by the Boston Comics Roundtable and the Art Institute of Boston, and co-organized by Dan Mazur; exhibitors include Karl Stevens, Patt Kelley, Liz Prince, Pat Barrett, Maris Wicks, Joe Quinones, Jesse Lonergan, Cathy Leamy, Dirk Tiede, Tim Fish, Zack Giallongo, Shelli Paroline, Craig Bostick, and Adam Miller
- October 1–3: Wizard World Big Apple Comic Con (Penn Plaza Pavilion, New York City, US)
- October 8–10: Komikazen (Ravenna, Italy) — guests include Igort (guest of honor), Apostolos Doxiadis, Maxilimilen Le Roy, Alecos Papadatos, and Aleksandar Zograf
- October 8–10: New York Comic Con (Jacob K. Javits Convention Center, New York City, US)
- October 14–17: Festival of Cartoon Art (Ohio State University, Columbus, Ohio) — speakers include Steve Breen, Roz Chast, Tony Cochran, Jan Eliot, Matt Groening & Tom Gammill, Dave Kellett, Paul Levitz, Dan Piraro, Jen Sorensen, James Sturm, and Gene Luen Yang
- October 16–17: Alternative Press Expo (APE) (San Francisco, California, US)
- October 30–31: Detroit FanFare (Hyatt Regency, Dearborn, Michigan, US) — guest of honor: Stan Lee; other guests include Jim Starlin, Carl Lundgren, Guy Davis, Mark Crilley, and Vince Locke
- October 29–31: Manitoba Comic Con (Winnipeg Convention Centre, Winnipeg, Manitoba, Canada) — guests include Garrett Wang, Orli Shoshan
- November 5–December 1: Comica — London International Comics Festival (London Print Studio, London, UK) — organized by Paul Gravett; guests include Charlie Adlard, Ho Che Anderson, Bryan Talbot, Darryl Cunningham, Paul Duffield, Hunt Emerson, Garen Ewing, Paul Grist, Roger Langridge, Ellen Lindner, Woodrow Phoenix. Plus Comica Comiket/National Collectors Marketplace at the Royal National Hotel, Russell Square.
- November 6–7: Mid-Ohio Con (Greater Columbus Convention Center, Columbus, Ohio, US) — 30th-anniversary show
- November 6: Tucson Comic Con (Hotel Arizona, Tucson, Arizona, US) — third annual show; guests include Max Cannon and John Layman
- November 7: Comica Comiket (Royal National Hotel, Russell Square, London, England) — held in conjunction with the National Collectors Marketplace. Drawing Parade participants include Charlie Adlard, Darryl Cunningham, Paul Duffield, Hunt Emerson, Garen Ewing, Paul Grist, Roger Langridge, Ellen Lindner, and Woodrow Phoenix
- November 20–22: Convencion de Juegos de Mesa y Comics (Monterrey, Mexico) — guests include Edgar Delgado and musical group Aural Vampire
- November 27: Genghis Con (Beachland Ballroom, Cleveland, Ohio) — guests include Derf Backderf, Gary Dumm, and Greg Budgett

== First issues by title ==
Brightest Day
Release: May by DC Comics. Writer: Geoff Johns
Critical Millennium
Release: October by Archaia Studios Press. Writer: Andrew E. C. Gaska Artist: Daniel Dussault
Echoes
Release: December by Top Cow Productions. Writer: Joshua Hale Fialkov Artist: Rahsan Ekedal
The Flash
Release: April by DC Comics. Writer: Geoff Johns Artist: Francis Manapul
Girl Comics
Release: March by Marvel Comics. Writer: various Artists: various
God of War
Release: March by WildStorm. Writer: Marv Wolfman Artist: Andrea Sorentino
A God Somewhere
Release: June by WildStorm. Writer: John Arcudi Artist: Peter Snejbjerg
Green Arrow
Release: June by DC Comics. Writer: J. T. Krul
Hawkeye & Mockingbird
Release: June by Marvel Comics. Writer: Jim McCann Artists: David Lopez
Revolver
Release: July by Vertigo. Writer & Artist: Matt Kindt
Uncanny X-Force
Release: October by Marvel Comics. Writer: Rick Remender Artist: Jerome Opena
WWE Heroes
Release: April by Titan Publishing. Writer: Keith Champagne Artist: Andy Smith

=== Renamed titles ===
The Dandy
Release: The Dandy Xtreme changes its name back to The Dandy with the last Dandy Xtreme, issue 3507, being dated 6 October 2010 and the retitled Dandy, issue 3508, being dated 30 October 2010. The comic now had British comedian Harry Hill on the front cover.

== See also ==
- List of The New York Times Manga Best Sellers of 2010
