= Alex Saviuk =

American comics artist (born 1952)

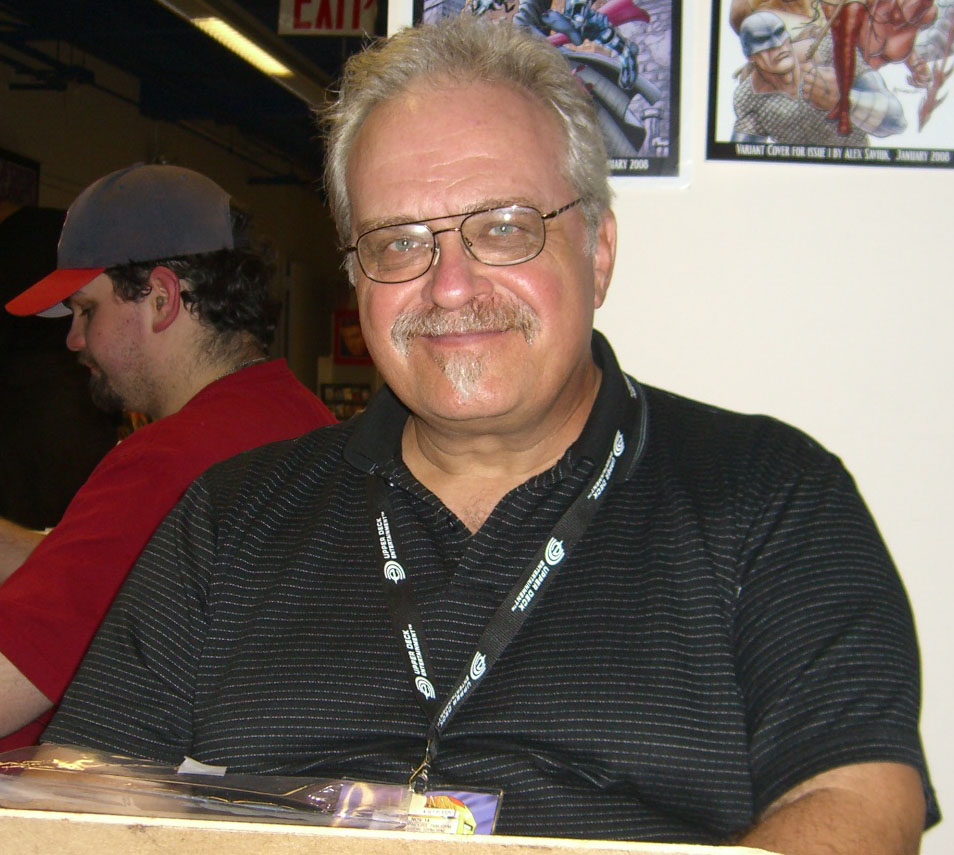
- Saviuk at the November 2008 Big Apple Comic Con in Manhattan.
- Born: August 17, 1952 (age 74)
- Areas: Penciller, Inker
- Notable works: The Amazing Spider-Man (newspaper comic strip); Web of Spider-Man

Alex Saviuk (/ˈsæviʌk/; born August 17, 1952) is an American comics artist primarily known for his work on the Marvel Comics character Spider-Man.

== Early life ==
Alex Saviuk grew up on Long Island, New York, graduating from Floral Park Memorial High School in 1970. He attended the School of Visual Arts, where he studied with (among others) Will Eisner, graduating in 1974 with a degree in Illustration. Saviuk also studied biology at Hofstra University and York College.

== Career ==
Saviuk's professional career began in 1977 at DC Comics, where he illustrated such titles as Green Lantern, The Flash, and Superman. Saviuk's first work for DC was a one-page story titled "The Victim!" in House of Mystery #255 (Nov.-Dec. 1977). His first full work for the company, Green Lantern #100 (Jan. 1978), introduced an updated version of the Air Wave character. Saviuk drew The Flash #275 (July 1979) wherein the title character's wife, Iris West Allen was killed.

In the early 1980s, Saviuk was the regular backup feature artist on Action Comics, where he drew the exploits of Air Wave, Aquaman, and the Atom in collaboration with writer Bob Rozakis. Rozakis stated in a 2014 interview that "I don't recall how we ended up with the three of them. It may have simply been that all three had names that began with 'A' and it was a backup in Action Comics". Saviuk frequently drew the "Whatever Happened to...?" backup feature in DC Comics Presents. He and writer E. Nelson Bridwell introduced the Global Guardians in DC Comics Presents #46 (June 1982).

The Amazing Spider-Man Sunday strip from 2004. Pencils by Saviuk, inks by Joe Sinnott.

In 1986, Saviuk moved to Marvel Comics, where he eventually established himself as a key Spider-Man artist with a seven-year run on Web of Spider-Man (issues #35–116). It was the longest run of a single artist on that series. In 1989, he drew The Amazing Spider-Man: Parallel Lives graphic novel. From 1994 to 1997, Saviuk worked on the series Spider-Man Adventures (later retitled The Adventures of Spider-Man). Beginning in 1997, Saviuk drew The Amazing Spider-Man Sunday newspaper comic strip, written by Stan Lee and inked by Joe Sinnott. Starting in 2003, he inked the daily Spider-Man strip, pencilled by Lee's brother Larry Lieber. After Lieber retired from the daily strip in September 2018, Saviuk took over as penciller as well and stayed on until the cancellation of the strip in March 2019. He created variant covers for Symbiote Spider-Man #1–5 (2019).

In 1997–1998, he spent a one-year stint at Topps Comics drawing The X-Files until the end of its run. For writer and filmmaker Robert Tinnell, Saviuk (alternating with Ed Piskor) did the artwork for the comic strip Feast of the Seven Fishes, first published online and, in 2005, as a collected print edition which has been nominated for an Eisner Award as "Best Graphic Album - Reprint" in 2006. In 2018, Tinnell adapted it for an eponymous movie.

In 2004, Alex Saviuk returned to The Phantom, a character he had already drawn in Defenders of the Earth in 1987, this time for European publisher Egmont. He has drawn numerous Fantomen (The Phantom) comics since then. From 2018 to 2019, he pencilled and inked the first and fourth issue of the new anthology series The Phantom Strikes.

Some of the characters Saviuk has co-created include Arkiss Chummuck and Malet Dasim of the Green Lantern Corps (with Bob Toomey), Sunburst (with Paul Kupperberg), Olympian (with E. Nelson Bridwell), Tombstone (with Gerry Conway), Nightwatch and the New Enforcers (both with Terry Kavanagh).

In addition to comics, Saviuk does storyboards for advertising agencies and, occasionally, film and animation studios. Among the films he storyboarded are Hoot and Never Back Down.

Saviuk lives in Florida with his wife. They have two children.

== Bibliography ==
=== DC Comics ===
- Action Comics #487–489, 511, 515–516, 521–540, 548–549, 559–560, 563–564, 567, 571, 573, 582 (1978–1986)
- Batman and the Outsiders Annual #1 (1984)
- Cancelled Comic Cavalcade #2 (1978)
- DC Comics Presents #46, 51, 55, 57, 63–64, 70, 72, 74, 89, 93 (1981–1986)
- DC Special Series #11 (1978)
- Detective Comics #489–491 (1980)
- The Flash #265–267, 273–279, 325 (1978–1983)
- Green Lantern #100–105, 107, 111–116, 118–119 (1978–1979)
- House of Mystery #255, 279, 287 (1977–1980)
- New Adventures of Superboy #28, 45–47 (1982–1983)
- Secret Origin of Hawkman (minicomic) (1980)
- Superman #360–361, 364, 368, 398, 403, 405–406 (1981–1985)
- Superman Annual #12 (1986)
- The Superman Family #195, 199–205 (1979–1981)
- Unknown Soldier #216 (1978)
- Vigilante #16 (1985)
- Who's Who: The Definitive Directory of the DC Universe #1–2, 4, 8, 18, 20 (1985–1986)
- World's Finest Comics #261, 267–270, 272–275, 277, 279–281 (1980–1982)

=== Marvel Comics ===
- Adventures of Spider-Man #1–4, 7–12 (1996–1997)
- The Amazing Spider-Man #292, 296–297 (1987–1988)
- The Amazing Spider-Man and the New Mutants one-shot (promo) (1990)
- The Amazing Spider-Man Exclusive Collectors' Edition #1 (promo) (1980)
- The Amazing Spider-Man NACME Series #1–2 (promo) (1990–1991)
- The Amazing Spider-Man: Parallel Lives graphic novel (1989)
- The Amazing Spider-Man: Skating on Thin Ice #1 (promo) (1990)
- Billy the Marlin #1 (promo) (1999)
- Captain America Meets the Asthma Monster #1 (promo) (1988)
- Chuck Norris: Karate Kommandos #4 (1987)
- Defenders of the Earth #1–4 (1987)
- Iron Man #211 (1986)
- Marvel Adventures #13 (1998)
- Marvel Creators' Choice X-Men #1 (promo) (1993)
- Nightmask #3 (1987)
- Pro Action Magazine: The Amazing Spider-Man #1 (promo) (1994)
- The Official Handbook of the Marvel Universe Deluxe Edition #10 (1986)
- Sledge Hammer! #1–2 (1988)
- Spider-Man Adventures #1–6, 8–15 (1994–1995)
- Spider-Man Interactive Comic Book oneshot (promo) (1996)
- Spider-Man: The Scorpion Sanction oneshot (promo) (1994)
- Star Brand #3 (1986)
- Web of Spider-Man #35–36, 38–45, 47–48, 50, 54–70, 73–80, 84–116, Annual #4, 10 (1988–1994)
- What The--?! #3 (1988)

=== Other publishers ===
- The Amazing Adventures of the Escapist #6 (inker) (2005)
- Fantomen (Egmont) #19/2004, #11/2005, #21/2006, #2–3/2013, #10–11/2013, #22–23/2013, #6–7/2014, #21/2014, #8/2015, #16/2015, #17/2015, #1/2016, #21/2016, #4/2017, #16/2017, #9/2018, #24/2018
- Feast of the Seven Fishes: The Collected Comic Strip (2005)
- The Phantom: Generations #9 (2010)
- The Phantom Strikes #1, 4 (2018–2019)
- Stan Lee's Mighty 7 #1–3 (2012)
- The Wicked West: Abomination and Other Tales (2004)
- The X-Files #30–41 (1997–1998)

=== Newspaper comic strips ===
- The Amazing Spider-Man (inker) (2003–2018), (penciller/inker) (2018–2019)
- The Amazing Spider-Man Sunday Page (1997–2019)

Preceded by Mike Grell	Green Lantern artist 1978–1979	Succeeded by Don Heck
Preceded by John Calnan and Rich Buckler	The Flash artist 1979	Succeeded by Don Heck
Preceded by Alan Kupperberg	The Amazing Spider-Man artist 1987–1988	Succeeded by Todd McFarlane
Preceded by Sal Buscema	Web of Spider-Man artist 1988–1994	Succeeded by Steven Butler
Preceded by Charlie Adlard and Gordon Purcell	The X-Files artist 1997–1998	Succeeded by n/a
