= Midnight, Mass. =

Publication information
- Publisher: Vertigo Comics
- Schedule: Monthly
- Format: Limited series
- Publication date: June 2002 – January 2003
- No. of issues: 8

Creative team
- Created by: John Rozum
- Written by: John Rozum
- Artist: Tomer Hanuka (covers)
- Penciller: Jesús Saiz
- Inker: Jimmy Palmiotti
- Letterer(s): Ken Bruzenak; John Costanza
- Colorist(s): Noelle Giddings; Kevin Somers
- Editor(s): Heidi MacDonald; Zachary Rau

Midnight, Mass. is a limited series comic book created by writer John Rozum, published by DC Comics's Vertigo imprint from 2002 to 2003. The series follows married occult experts Adam and Julia Kadmon as they deal with supernatural cases around America. In a 2011 interview concerning the relaunch of his Xombi series, Rozum revealed that Adam and Julia were conceived as the lead characters for a potential Xombi spin-off back when the series was still being published by Milestone Comics.

== Overview ==
The series centres on the world famous occult experts and monster hunters Adam and Julia Kadmon, who live in the town of Midnight, Massachusetts. The Kadmon's new assistant, Jenny, has just arrived to work for the couple and soon finds herself plunged into their world of monsters and strange goings on.

== Sequel ==
Midnight, Mass: Here There Be Monsters, a six issue sequel mini-series, was published by Vertigo Comics in 2004. The series picks up where the original series ended but this time features the artwork of Paul Lee, replacing original artist Jesús Saiz.

== Television series ==
A television series based on Midnight, Mass was put into development by NBC in 2009 for the 2010-11 television season. The show received a script order and was developed by Aaron Harberts, Gretchen J. Berg and Warner Bros. Television but was not developed any further than the scripting stage.

The show had previously been in development for several years with a number of writers and production companies pitching television adaptions.

== Collected editions ==
The first mini-series was collected in October 2024.
