= Jim Salicrup =

American comic book editor (born 1957)

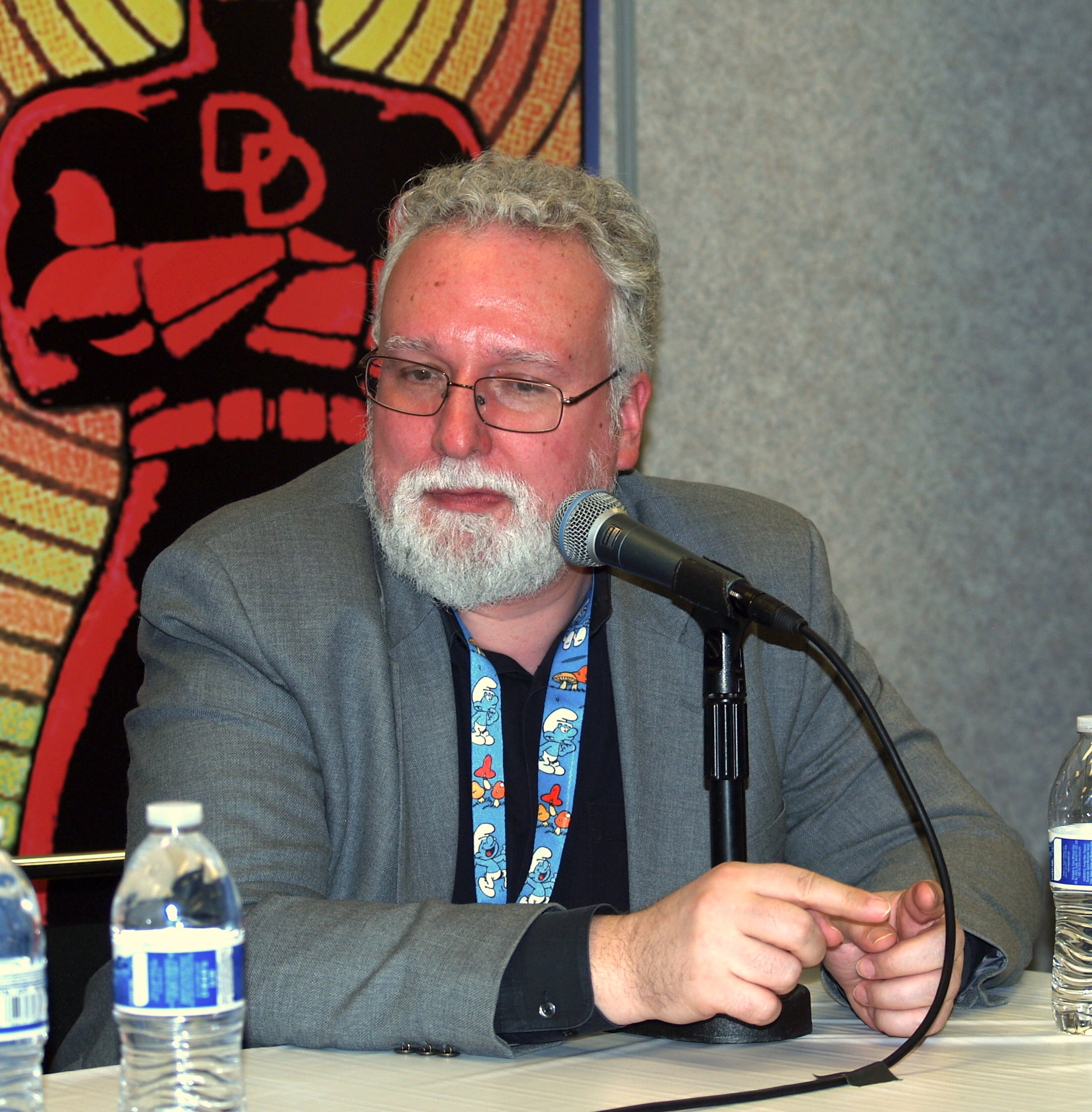
- Salicrup at the 2015 East Coast Comicon in Secaucus, New Jersey
- Born: May 29, 1957 (age 69)
- Areas: Editor, writer
- Notable works: Uncanny X-Men; Marvel Age; The Amazing Spider-Man

Jim Salicrup (/ˈsælɪkrʌp/; born May 29, 1957) is an American comic book editor, known for his tenures at Marvel Comics and Topps Comics. At Marvel, where he worked for twenty years, he edited books such as Uncanny X-Men, Fantastic Four, The Avengers and various Spider-Man titles. At Topps, he edited books such as Bram Stoker's Dracula, X-Files and Zorro.

He later worked at Stan Lee Media, before becoming editor-in-chief at Papercutz, which publishes Nancy Drew and The Hardy Boys. He is also a trustee at the Museum of Comic and Cartoon Art.

== Career ==
Salicrup began his comics career at Marvel Comics when he was 15, having written to Roy Thomas offering to be "a Marvel slave"; Thomas and Sol Brodsky hired him to be a messenger transporting original art to the offices of the Comics Code Authority for approval. He subsequently worked his way up to editor. He co-wrote Marvel Premiere #50 (Oct. 1979) which featured rock musician Alice Cooper as a comics character. In that same year, he wrote the novelty comic book printed on a toilet paper roll for The Amazing Spider-Man and the Incredible Hulk Salicrup recalled in a 2007 interview that "With the Marvel TP, it was a funny idea that communicated that Marvel was a company that obviously didn't take itself too seriously -- which was a big part of Marvel's wide appeal."

As a Marvel employee for twenty years, Salicrup edited The Avengers, Uncanny X-Men, and Fantastic Four. Salicrup was the editor of Marvel Age magazine for eight years from issue #6 (September 1983) to #104 (September 1991). In 1987, Salicrup became the editor of The Amazing Spider-Man and oversaw the "Kraven's Last Hunt" storyline. He is credited with coming up with the idea of running "Kraven's Last Hunt" as a crossover through all the Spider-Man titles. He followed this by hiring Todd McFarlane to draw the title. The popularity of McFarlane's work led to the launch of another Spider-Man title, Spider-Man, which Salicrup edited as well. He wrote licensed Marvel comic adaptations of the Kool-Aid Man, the Quik Bunny, The A-Team, The Transformers, and Sledge Hammer!. Salicrup and artist June Brigman created a promotional comic book for Cheap Trick's Busted album in 1990.

In 1992, Salicrup became the editor-in-chief of Topps Comics, where he edited Bram Stoker's Dracula, The X-Files, The Lone Ranger and Tonto, Zorro, Lady Rawhide, a line of Jack Kirby superhero titles, Ray Bradbury Comics, and more.

At Stan Lee Media, Salicrup served as senior writer/editor, as well as the writer and voice of "Stan Lee's Evil Clone".

Salicrup served as the editor-in-chief at Papercutz, publishers of Nancy Drew, The Hardy Boys, Tales From The Crypt, Totally Spies!, and Zorro graphic novels. He departed the company following its acquisition by Mad Cave Studios.

He is a trustee at the Museum of Comic and Cartoon Art (MoCCA).

== Appearances in media ==
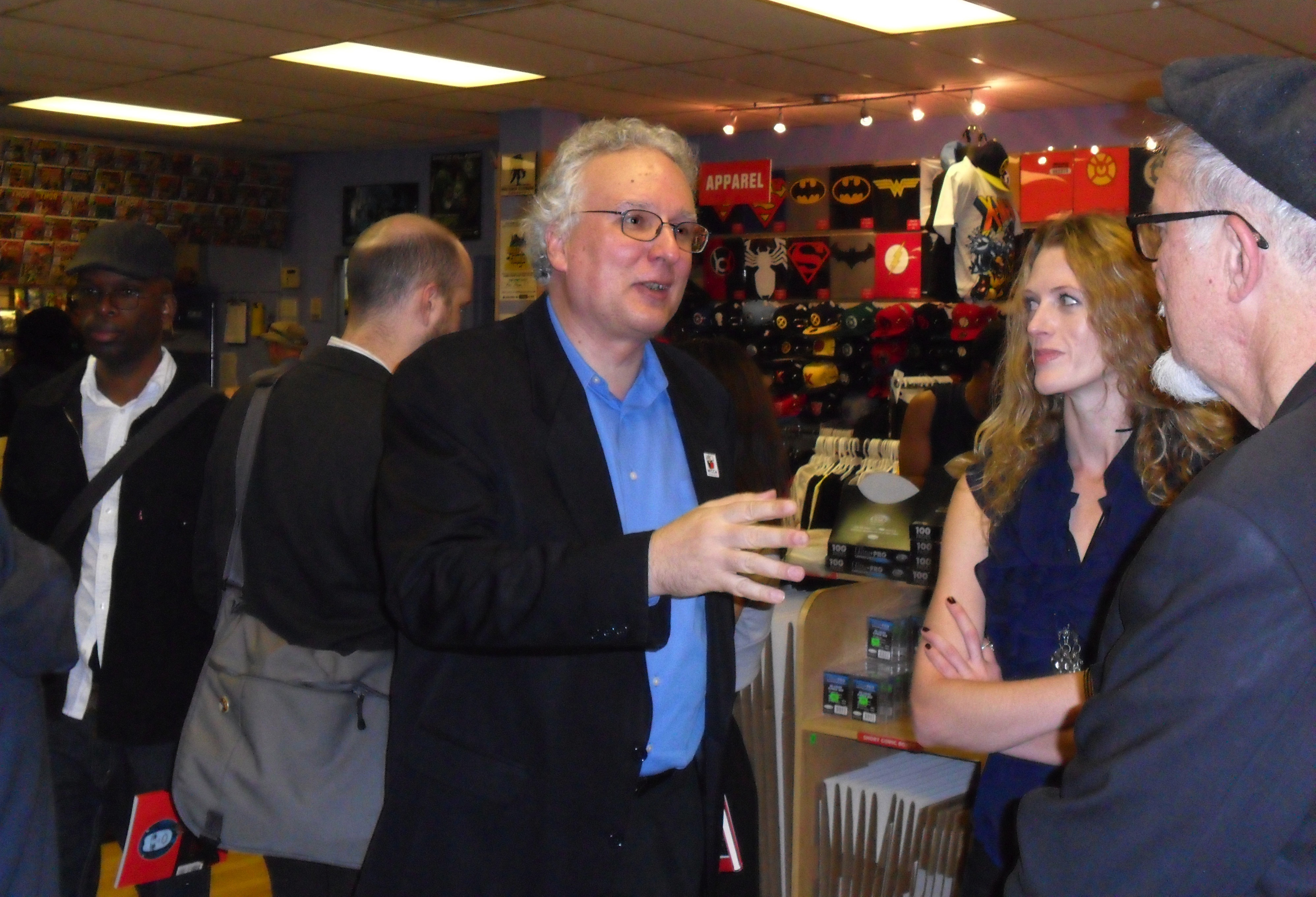
Salicrup at a book signing for Dean Haspiel at Midtown Comics Grand Central in Manhattan, September 15, 2010

The name "Salicrup" was used as a unit of measuring time in DC Comics' R.E.B.E.L.S. issue #8, November 2009.

== Personal life ==
Salicrup lives in Manhattan's East Village, not far from the site of the 2015 East Village gas explosion.

== Bibliography ==
=== Marvel Comics ===
- Adventures of Kool-Aid Man #1–3 (1983–1985)
- Adventures of Quik Bunny #1 (1984)
- The A-Team #1–2 (1984)
- Cheap Trick: Busted #1 (1990)
- Heathcliff #4 (1985)
- Inhumanoids #1–4 (1987)
- Marvel Premiere #50 (Alice Cooper) (1979)
- Sledge Hammer! #1–2 (1988)
- Spider-Man and Power Pack #1 (1984)
- Spider-Man: Christmas in Dallas #1 (Dallas Times Herald supplement) (1983)
- Spider-Man, Firestar, and Iceman at the Dallas Ballet #1 (Dallas Times Herald supplement) (1983)
- Spidey Super Stories #15–19, 21–23, 25–27, 29, 32–36, 39, 42–43, 45–52 (1976–1981)
- The Transformers #2–4 (1984–1985)
- Uncanny X-Men at the State Fair of Texas #1 (Dallas Times Herald supplement) (1983)
- Visionaries: Knights of the Magical Light #1–2 (1987–1988)

=== Oh Dawn! Inc. ===
- The Amazing Spider-Man & The Incredible Hulk: The Gamma Gambit toilet paper (1979)

Preceded by Roger Stern	The Avengers editor 1980–1982	Succeeded by Mark Gruenwald
Preceded by Roger Stern	Uncanny X-Men editor 1980	Succeeded by Louise Simonson
Preceded by Mark Gruenwald	Fantastic Four editor 1980–1983	Succeeded by Tom DeFalco
Preceded by Lea Sapp	Marvel Age editor 1983–1991	Succeeded by Renée Witterstaetter
Preceded by Christopher Priest	The Amazing Spider-Man editor 1987–1991	Succeeded by Danny Fingeroth
Preceded by Christopher Priest	Web of Spider-Man editor 1987–1991	Succeeded by Danny Fingeroth
Preceded by Christopher Priest	The Spectacular Spider-Man editor 1987–1991	Succeeded by Danny Fingeroth
