= Captain Victory and the Galactic Rangers =

1980s comic book series

- Cover of the first issue

Publication information
- Publisher: Pacific Comics; Topps Comics; Icon Comics; Dynamite Entertainment
- Schedule: Pacific: Irregular; Current: Monthly
- Format: Ongoing series
- Genre: Science fiction, superhero
- Publication date: November 1981 – January 1984
- No. of issues: 13 + 1 special
- Main character: Captain Victory

Creative team
- Created by: Jack Kirby
- Written by: Jack Kirby
- Penciller: Jack Kirby
- Inker: Mike Royer
- Letterer: Mike Royer
- Colorist: Steve Oliff
- Editor: David Scroggy

Captain Victory is a comic book originally created, written and drawn by Jack Kirby. It was first published by American comic book publisher Pacific Comics in 1981. Kirby agreed to create a comic for the fledgling publisher because Pacific promised him full creative control, and ownership of the characters.

== Publication history ==
One of Pacific Comics' first titles, the original run of Captain Victory and the Galactic Rangers lasted thirteen issues, plus a special, through January 1984. All were written, illustrated, and edited by Jack Kirby.

In the last issues of the Pacific series, Kirby crafted an origin story for Captain Victory which he tied into the New Gods comic book that he had written and drawn for DC Comics in the 1970s. It was suggested that Victory was the son of the New God Orion. Orion was not specifically named, but a number of clues were planted, including equipment said to belong to Victory's father that was identical to the Astro-Harness ridden by Orion. Additionally, Victory's grandfather, Blackmaas, was illustrated only as a cast shadow, but a shadow that to many readers bore a resemblance to Orion's father Darkseid.

After the end of Pacific, no more was seen of Captain Victory until Topps Comics attempted to revive the character as part of a planned five-issue mini-series. It only lasted one issue (Victory #1, June 1994) before Topps cancelled all of the 'Kirbyverse' books in 1994. This issue was a part of a more complex project named Secret City Saga.

TwoMorrows Publishing created a 'graphite edition' reprint of the first Captain Victory issue. The edition, in TwoMorrow's words, "presented [Captain Victory #1] as it was created (before it was broken up for the later Pacific Comics series), reproduced from copies of Jack's uninked pencils!"

In 2000, Jack Kirby's grandson Jeremy Kirby launched Jack Kirby Comics, the fledgling company's only offering being a three-issue retelling of Captain Victory, reordered and rescripted by Jeremy.

In 2006, a new series was published, based on rejected character sketches for the Wonder Warriors. Jack Kirby's Galactic Bounty Hunters was co-written by Kirby's daughter Lisa and is creator-owned by her under Marvel's Icon imprint. Captain Victory and the Galactic Rangers guest-starred in issue #3 of the six-issue limited series.

In late 2011, Dynamite Entertainment started a new series under the Kirby: Genesis title, which used many of Kirby's created and owned characters (many unpublished), including Captain Victory. This led, in November 2011, to a new Captain Victory title which lasted six issues. It was later collected into a trade paperback.

A new continuing series, Captain Victory and the Galactic Rangers, written by Joe Casey and published by Dynamite Entertainment, began in August 2014. It ran for 6 issues and was collected into a trade paperback in 2016.

== Collected editions ==
In 2007, Image Comics planned to publish a completely recolored one volume collection of Jack Kirby's 14 issues of Captain Victory, including an all-new Captain Victory comic book featuring many of Jack Kirby's never-before-seen creations. The hardcover collection was scheduled to be released in November 2007 (ISBN 1582408149), but production issues delayed the hardcover, so that better source material could be located.
