= Adrian Salmon =

English comic book artist and illustrator

- Areas: Penciller, Inker
- Notable works: Judge Karyn

Adrian Salmon is a comic book artist and illustrator from England.

== Biography ==
Salmon's early work included the series "The Cybermen" for Doctor Who Magazine and "Judge Karyn" for the Judge Dredd Megazine. He then spent time working on various Panini Comics titles including The Rugrats and Action Man. Salmon later became better known as a comic book colourist, working primarily on the Doctor Who strip and various Panini superhero titles.

He was commissioned to work on the ongoing 'Time Team' series of articles for Doctor Who Magazine, providing illustrations of the televised Doctor Who stories. He also provides the cover artwork for the Bernice Summerfield range of audio CDs produced by Big Finish Productions.

Salmon has published a graphic novel, The Faceless: A Terry Sharp Story.

== Bibliography ==
- Judge Karyn (with John Freeman):
  - "Skinner" (in Judge Dredd Megazine #2.56-2.61, 1994)
  - "Concrete Sky" (in Judge Dredd Megazine #2.67-2.72, 1994)
  - "Beautiful Evil" (in Judge Dredd Mega Special 1994)
- Judge Dredd:
  - "Sinned-in City" (with Robbie Morrison, in Judge Dredd Mega Special 1994)
  - "1963" (with David Bishop, in Judge Dredd Mega Special 1996)
  - "A Nativity Tale" (with Gordon Rennie, in Judge Dredd Megazine #201, 2003)
  - "Lazarus" (with Gordon Rennie, in Judge Dredd Megazine #217, 2004)
- Cabal (with John Freeman, in Judge Dredd Megazine #3.07-3.08, 1995)
- Deathwatch: "Faust & Falsehood" (with Paul Cornell, in Judge Dredd Megazine #3.08-3.13, 1995–1996)
- Armitage: "Little Assassins" (with Dave Stone, in Judge Dredd Mega Special 1996)
- Doctor Who:
  - "The Cybermen: The Hungry Sea" (with Alan Barnes, in Doctor Who Magazine #227-229)
  - "The Cybermen: The Dark Flame (with Alan Barnes, in Doctor Who Magazine #230-233)
  - "By Hook or By Crook" (with Scott Gray, in Doctor Who Magazine #256, collected in End Game, 212 pages, 2005, ISBN 1-905239-09-2)
  - The Glorious Dead (244 pages, 2006, ISBN 1-905239-44-0) collects:
    - "Unnatural Born Killers" (script and art, in Doctor Who Magazine #277)
    - "The Company of Thieves" (with Scott Gray, in Doctor Who Magazine #284-286)
  - "Character Assassin" (With Scott Gray, in Doctor Who Magazine #311, collected in Oblivion, 228 pages, 2006, ISBN 1-905239-45-9)
  - "The Power of Thoueris!" (with Scott Gray, in Doctor Who Magazine #333, collected in The Flood, 226 pages, 2007, ISBN 978-1-905239-65-8)
