= Armitage (comics) =

Detective-Judge Armitage
- Judge Armitage (centre) (painted by Sean Phillips)

Publication information
- Publisher: IPC Media (Fleetway) to 1999, thereafter Rebellion Developments
- First appearance: Judge Dredd Megazine Vol. 1, #9 (June 1991)
- Created by: Dave Stone; Sean Phillips

In-story information
- Team affiliations: Brit-Cit Justice Department

Armitage is a science fiction series appearing in the British comic anthology the Judge Dredd Megazine, created by Dave Stone and Sean Phillips in 1991. The protagonist is a Detective-Judge in Brit-Cit, a British mega-city in the universe of Judge Dredd. He has also made occasional appearances in the main Judge Dredd series in 2000 AD, as well as two spin-off novels and an audio drama.

In the same way that Dredd was based partly on Dirty Harry, Armitage owes something to the cynical but unbending police detectives seen in dramas such as Inspector Morse and Taggart. Although an outstanding detective, he is difficult to work with and often clashes with his superiors in Brit-Cit's corrupt, class-ridden Justice Department. Like many such characters, he has a junior partner: usually Detective-Judge Treasure Steel, and in later stories upper-class Detective-Judge Timothy "Timbo" Parkerston-Trant.

== Biography ==
Armitage is a tall, white haired man with a goatee, usually wearing a trenchcoat, suit and tie. His real name is unknown: "Armitage" was a fake ID he used in 2080.

He despises the system of privilege that got his superiors where they are and, by extension, his superiors themselves. Because he refuses to "play the game", he is very unpopular with the upper ranks, despite being very good at his job. Another character trait is that he never carries a gun. Despite this, Armitage's knowledge of weapons is extensive, mainly due to his activities during the Brit-Cit Civil War, when he fought in the London Liberation Army against the Emergency Military Government: however, the LLA were on the losing side and in 2080, he decided to join the Judges instead. The corruption of the new government saw him become cynical and morose, and this only got worse when his lover Liora was killed by the crime lord Efil Drago San, in revenge for the Detective Judge crippling him.

Although this means he has gained a reputation for being impossible to work with, Armitage has done outstanding work in the Brit-Cit Justice Department's plainclothes Homicide Division. He has managed to not only irritate his higher-ups though but also most of the other Judges, to the extent that when Shok-Tak (Brit-Cit's SWAT division) entered a building to rescue a Judge in danger, they remarked with disgust "aw, drokk it, it's only Armitage".

== Publications ==
He has appeared in his own eponymous comic series as well as two Judge Dredd novels and audio play. In the audio, he was played by Trevor Littledale.

=== Comics ===
- Armitage (all written by Dave Stone, except where otherwise stated):
  - "Armitage" (with Sean Phillips, in Judge Dredd Megazine (vol. 1) #9-14, 1991, collected in Judge Dredd Megazine Supplement 13, 2009)
  - "The Case of the Detonating Dowager" (with Sean Phillips, in Judge Dredd Yearbook 1993, 1992)
  - "Influential Circles" (with Charlie Adlard, in Judge Dredd Megazine (vol. 2) #10-18, 1992, collected in Judge Dredd Megazine Supplement 15–16, 2009)
  - "Flashback" (with Charlie Adlard, in Judge Dredd Megazine (vol. 2) #19-21, 1993, collected in Judge Dredd Megazine Supplement 16, 2009)
  - "Flashback II" (with Charlie Adlard, in Judge Dredd Megazine (vol. 2) #31-33, 1993, collected in Judge Dredd Megazine Supplement 30, 2010)
  - "The Fall Of The House Of Toddler" (with Russell Fox, in Judge Dredd Yearbook 1994)
  - "City of the Dead Prologue" (with Peter Doherty, in Judge Dredd Megazine (vol. 2) #63, 1994)
  - "City of the Dead" (with Charles Gillespie, in Judge Dredd Megazine (vol. 2) #64-71, 1994–1995)
  - "Dog Underground" (text story, with illustrations by Kevin Cullen, in Judge Dredd Megazine (vol. 3) #13, 1995)
  - "Little Assassins" (text story, with illustrations by Adrian Salmon, in Judge Dredd 1996 Mega Special)
  - "Bodies of Evidence" (with Steve Yeowell, in Judge Dredd Megazine (vol. 3) #64-67, 2000, collected in Judge Dredd Megazine Supplement 30, 2010)
  - "Apostasy in the UK" (with John Ridgway, in Judge Dredd Megazine #212-213, 2003)
  - "Dumb Blond" (with John Cooper, in Judge Dredd Megazine #266-270, 2008)
  - "The Mancunian Candidate" (with John Cooper, in Judge Dredd Megazine #285-290, 2009)
  - "The Unpleasantness at the Tontine Club" (with John Cooper, in Judge Dredd Megazine #300-301, 2010)
  - "The Underground" (with Patrick Goddard, in Judge Dredd Megazine #318-321, 2012)
- Judge Dredd
  - "The Lion's Den" (written by Michael Carroll, art by P. J. Holden, in 2000 AD #1978-1985, 2016)
  - "Reclamation" (written by Michael Carroll, art by Colin MacNeil, in 2000 AD #1986-1990, 2016; last episode only)
- Armitage:
  - "Natural Fern Killer" (written by Liam Johnson, art by Robin Smith & Matt Soffe, in 2000 AD Sci-Fi Special 2021)
  - "An Underlying Fear" (written by Mike Carroll, art by Steve Yeowell & John Charles, in Judge Dredd Megazine #448, 2022)
  - "Bullets for an Old Man" (written by Liam Johnson, art by Warren Pleece, in Judge Dredd Megazine #467-471, 2024)
  - "Murder, Setting: Automate, Express" (written by Liam Johnson, art by Warren Pleece, in Judge Dredd Megazine #479-480, 2025)
  - "Drokk the Ripper" (written by Liam Johnson, art by Staz Johnson, in Judge Dredd Megazine #485–489, 2025-26)

=== Novels ===
- Judge Dredd:
  - Deathmasques (by Dave Stone, Virgin Books, August 1993, ISBN 0-352-32873-8)
  - The Medusa Seed (by Dave Stone, Virgin Books, January 1994, ISBN 0-352-32895-9)

=== Audio CD ===
- Get Karter! (script by David Bishop, Big Finish Productions, 2002)
