= Charlie Adlard =

British comic book artist (born 1966)

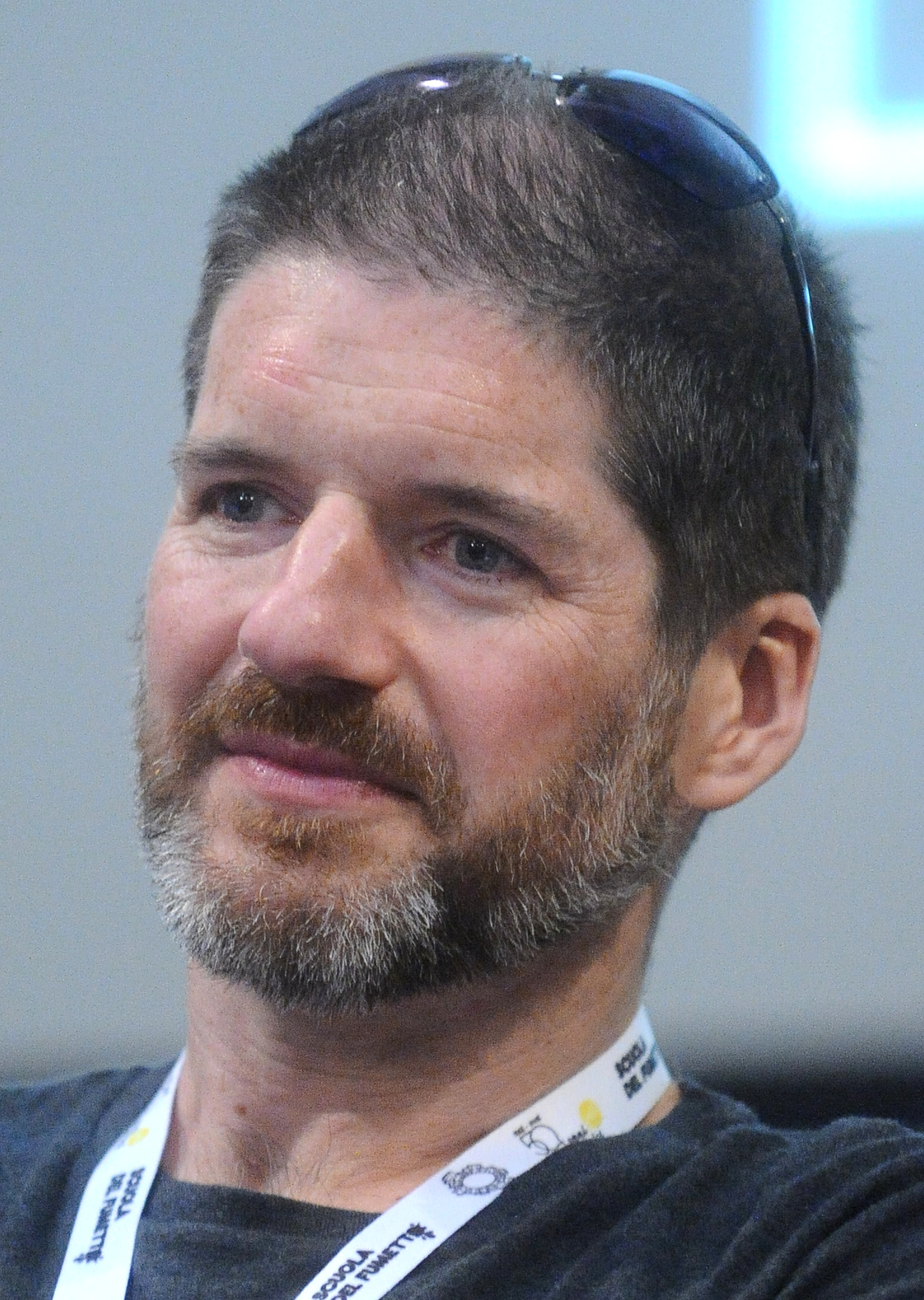
- Charlie Adlard at Lucca Comics & Games 2016
- Born: Charles Adlard; 4 August 1966 (age 60) Shrewsbury, England
- Area: Penciller
- Notable works: The Walking Dead; Savage; Codeflesh
- Awards: Inkpot Award (2012)

Charles Adlard (born 4 August 1966) is a British comic book artist known for his work on books such as The Walking Dead and Savage.

== Career ==
Adlard began his work in the UK on White Death with Robbie Morrison and 2000 AD series including Judge Dredd, and Armitage. He has continued working for them with the series Savage.

In the United States he is best known for his work on The X-Files (for Topps), Astronauts in Trouble (for AiT/Planet Lar) and The Walking Dead (for Image Comics).

He has been the penciller on The Walking Dead since 2004.

Other work includes: Mars Attacks! (also for Topps); The Hellfire Club and Warlock for Marvel Comics; Batman: Gotham Knights and Green Lantern/Green Arrow for DC Comics; White Death for Les Cartoonistes Dangereux; Blair Witch: Dark Testaments and Codeflesh for Image; Shadowman for Acclaim Comics; and The Establishment for Wildstorm, among many others.

He illustrated a graphic novel, Playing the Game, written by Nobel Prize winner Doris Lessing. In 1992, he collaborated with best-selling horror writer, Guy N. Smith Crabs' Fury. The one-shot was re-released as a limited edition in September 2008 through Ghostwriter Publications.

In 2012, Adlard was one of several artists to illustrate a variant cover for Robert Kirkman's The Walking Dead #100, which was released 11 July at San Diego Comic-Con.

== Bibliography ==
- Judge Dredd:
  - "The Hand of Fate" (with Alan Grant, in Judge Dredd Megazine vol. 1 #18, March 1992)
  - "War Games" (with John Wagner, in 2000 AD #1153-1159, July–September 1999)
  - "Endgame" (with John Wagner, in 2000 AD #1160-1164, September–October 1999)
  - "The Satanist" (with John Wagner, in 2000 AD #1350-1356, July–September 2003)
  - "Gulag" (with Gordon Rennie, in 2000 AD #1382-1386, 2004)
- Warheads: Black Dawn (pencils, with writer Craig Huston and inks by James Hodgkins, 2-issue mini-series, Marvel UK, 1992)
- Armitage (with Dave Stone):
  - "Influential Circles" (in Judge Dredd Megazine vol. 2 #10-18, 1992)
  - "Flashback" (in Judge Dredd Megazine vol. 2 #19-21, 1993)
  - "Flashback II" (in Judge Dredd Megazine vol. 2 #31-33, 1993)
- Judge Hershey: "Hershey & Steel - Degenomancer" (with Dave Stone, in Judge Dredd Megazine vol. 2 #35-36, 1993)
- Playing the Game (graphic novel by Doris Lessing, 1995)
- Rogue Trooper (Friday): "Angels" (with Steve White, in 2000 AD #950-52, 1995)
- The X-Files #1-16, 18–19, 22–23, and 27-29 (with Stefan Petrucha and John Rozum, Topps Comics, 1995–1997)
- The Crow: Wild Justice (with Jerry Prosser, Kitchen Sink Press, 1996)
- Shadowman #5-15 (with Jamie Delano, Acclaim Comics, 1997–1998)
- Hellblazer #108 (with Paul Jenkins, Vertigo)
- The Establishment #1-13 (with Ian Edginton, Wildstorm, 2001–2002)
- Nikolai Dante (with Robbie Morrison):
  - "The Full Dante" (in 2000 AD #1071, 1997)
  - "Masque of Dante" (in 2000 AD #1125-1127, 1999)
  - "Tour of Duty" (in 2000 AD #1131-1133, 1999)
  - "Fists of Fury" (in 2000 AD #1141, 1999)
  - "Last Dance of the Trans-Siberian" (in 2000 AD #1142-1143, 1999)
  - "The BandyMan" ( with Stephan Petrucha and Jill Thompson Caliber Comics ,1996)
- White Death (with Robbie Morrison, 96 pages, Les Cartoonistes Dangereux, 1998, ISBN 1-902429-00-1, AiT/Planet Lar, 2002, ISBN 0-9709360-6-0, Image Comics, 2014, ISBN 978-1-63215-142-1)
- Pulp Sci-Fi: "Buzz Tycho's Last Stand" (with Gordon Rennie, in 2000 AD #1146, 1999)
- Astronauts in Trouble (with Larry Young, AiT/Planet Lar, 1999–2000)
- Batman/Scarface (2001)
- Thunderbolts: Life Sentences #1 (Marvel, 2001)
- Codeflesh (with Joe Casey, in Double Image/Double Take #1-8, Image Comics, 2001–2002, softcover, Codeflesh, 144 pages, AiT/Planet Lar, November 2003, ISBN 1-932051-15-5, hardcover, Codeflesh: The Definitive Edition, 128 pages, Image Comics, March 2009, ISBN 1-60706-077-9)
- Savage (with Pat Mills):
  - "Savage Book I" (in 2000 AD #1387-1396, 2004)
  - "Savage Book II" (in 2000 AD #1450-1459, 2005)
  - "Savage Book III" (in 2000 AD #1526-1535, February–May 2007)
- Warlock (vol. 5) (with Greg Pak, 4-issue mini-series, Marvel Comics, 2004)
- The Walking Dead #7-193 (with Robert Kirkman, Image Comics, 2004–2019)
- Rock Bottom (with Joe Casey, graphic novel, 112 pages, 2006, ISBN 1-932051-45-7)
- Le Souffle du Wendigo (Breath of the Wendigo) (with Mathieu Misoffe, Soleil Productions, February 2009, ISBN 2-302-00482-5)

=== Covers ===
- Gen 13 Bootleg #20 cover artist July 1998
- FutureQuake #5 (cover artist, Winter 2005)

== Links ==
- Charlie Adlard at the Comic Book DB (archived from the original)
- Charlie Adlard at the Grand Comics Database
- Charlie Adlard at the Big Comic Book DataBase
- Charlie Adlard at 2000 AD online
- Comic Book Awards Almanac

== Interviews ==
- Incoherentboy Chats With…Charlie Adlard – Part I, incoherentboy.com, 14 October 2012
- artINTERVIEWS with Charlie Adlard, artinterviews.tumblr.com (2010)
- 2005 Interview, 2000ADReview.co.uk (2005)
- Interview with Charlie Adlard about his works and comics in general, web.archive.org; accessed 7 July 2017.
- Charlie Adlard: giving life to the zombies of the Walking Dead, The Times, 6 July 2009.
- Interview, imaginedaily.com; accessed 7 July 2017.
