= John Rozum =

Comics author

John Rozum is an American writer of comic books and graphic novels who is best known for his work for Milestone Comics, where he wrote Xombi and Kobalt. He has also written most often for DC Comics but has also written for Topps Comics (where he wrote a comicbook adaptation of The X-Files) and Marvel Comics. In 2009, NBC announced that they were beginning an adaptation of Rozum's Vertigo Comics series: Midnight, Mass.

In September 2011, Rozum debuted the Static Shock title as part of The New 52 event. Rozum subsequently left the book after issue 4. In a personal blog he cited a lack of input in the comic as his reason for leaving.

Aside from his personal blog, Rozum regularly publishes on The Grim Gallery which he runs as a digital museum for treasures from classic Hollywood horror films.

Rozum is also a collage artist whose work typically centers around cartoon characters and classic horror villains.

== Bibliography ==
=== Comics ===
- DC Comics
  - Superman: The Man of Steel #34, #91 (1994, 1999)
  - Action Comics #756 (1999)
  - Flinch #3, 11 (1999-2000)
  - Dexter's Laboratory #3, 6–9, 11–13, 15–17, 20–22, 26 (1999-2002)
  - Scooby Doo #53, 55, 60-66 (2001-2003)
  - The Flash: Time Flies #1 (2002) with [Seth Fisher])
  - Midnight, Mass. #1-8 (2002-2003)
  - Powerpuff Girls #6, 14, 22, 41 (2000-2003)
  - Midnight, Mass. Here There Be Monsters #1-6 (2004)
  - Detective Comics #835 - #836 (2007)
  - The Brave and The Bold Vol. 3 #26 (2009)
  - The Web #1-8 (2009-2010)
  - Mighty Crusaders Special #1 (2010)
  - Xombi Vol. 2 #1-6 (2011-2012)
  - Static Shock #1 - 4 (2011 - 2012)
- Marvel Comics
  - What If? #3, 7, 16, 34 (1989-1992)
  - Clive Barker's Hellraiser #8, 12, 17 (1991-1992)
  - X-Man #8 (1995)
  - Daredevil #351 (1996)
  - ‘’Marvel: Shadows & Light’’ #1 (1996) Captain Marvel story only
- Milestone Comics
  - Xombi #0-21 (1994-1995)
  - Kobalt #1-16 (1994-1995)
- Topps Comics
  - The X-Files Annual #2 (1996)
  - X-Files #17-19, 22-41 (1996-1998)
