= Kobalt (character) =

- Kobalt, by artist Eric Battle.

Publication information
- Publisher: DC Comics
- First appearance: Kobalt #1 (June 1994)
- Created by: John Rozum (writer); Arvell Jones (artist)

In-story information
- Abilities: Acrobat and martial artist

Kobalt is a superhero appearing in American comic books published by DC Comics. He first appears in Kobalt #1 (June 1993), and was created by John Rozum and Arvell Jones.

== Publication history ==
Kobalt was a vigilante superhero with a ruthless and fierce reputation. Some criminals even believed he was a cannibal. Kobalt carries a vendetta against the St. Cloud criminal organization. Kobalt's first appearance was in Kobalt #1 as he harasses some of the employees of St. Cloud. After the battle, Kobalt learns from fellow vigilante Clover that several of Cloud's men are manipulating his organization for profit and other sinister purposes without Cloud being aware of it.

Despite this, Kobalt refuses to team up with Clover; he insists on no new partners ever. It was soon learned he had at least one before, who had managed to set up a very illegal phone line that only a few know about. One of these people is Councilman Tyler Page, the father of a teenage son named Richard, who is an inept superhero groupie. Kobalt owes Councilman Page a debt; he calls it in by asking Kobalt to train Rick to be a superhero.

Kobalt reluctantly begins Rick's training and is impressed when his best efforts to discourage Rick make the boy train even harder. He goes so far as to have a Kevlar costume made for Rick as he continues training. Kobalt's goal was to train Rick a lot longer before allowing him to go out crimefighting, but Rick had other ideas.

Kobalt investigates the as-yet-unknown party skimming money from St. Cloud to form a rival criminal empire and finds himself battling three supervillains: Volt, who wears an exoskeleton that delivers electric shocks; Slick, whose body is living oil and Red Light, who is only visible in infrared. Slick and Red Light lead a group of Volt's men to knock over an armored car and steal the small box it was carrying. Kobalt's interrogation of a small timer he captured leads him to the scene of the crime. Rick, who Kobalt left behind at his hideaway, put on his new costume and came to help, against Kobalt's orders. He found the thug Kobalt still tied up and got the location from him as well. He was able to alert Kobalt to Red Light's invisibility and thereby saved him from being shot by her. Kobalt stole the briefcase and got away. He urged Rick to run and meet up with him later. Instead, Rick sneaked into the trunk of one of the thug's cars so he could find the criminal behind the heist and alert Kobalt.

Kobalt discovers that the box he stole has everything needed to bring down Edwin Alva's criminal empire, but is interrupted from figuring out why someone else wanted it by a phone call. Volt had captured Rick, whom he'd overheard called "Page" and told Kobalt that Page would die unless Kobalt came and brought the files. Kobalt broke into the office of Cape and Cowl magazine, got information on Volt, Slick and Red Light and went to rescue his partner. He "borrowed" an experimental electricity-deflecting suit and went to the rescue. He defeated the three of them at the cost of his anonymity. Thanks to the video of him and Page fighting Slick, Red Light and Volt's men at the armored car, his mystique was gone.

The first feedback from this "outing" was from Hardware. He came for the box with Alva's evidence, and Kobalt surrendered it without incident. He blamed Page for outing him at first, but reversed himself and agreed to resume training Page.

St. Cloud now realizes that Kobalt is real and uses a small-time thug Kobalt recently beat up to set a trap for him. Kobalt found himself facing three costumed thugs named Hook, Line and Sinker with gimmicks to match their names. Kobalt beat up all three of them in less than a minute and found evidence on them to keep up his investigation.

He finds himself facing wave after wave of St. Cloud's hired thugs and dealing with the ones St. Cloud hired to handle his internal security issues. St. Cloud hired a Mr. Glass to kill one of his hirelings who stole and resold a crate of guns he was supposed to transport to their buyers. Mr. Glass blew up the school bus that the man drove along with the 17 children aboard. Clover joined Kobalt in the fight, but was shot in the leg and forced to the sidelines after a battle with one more of St. Cloud's enhanced enforcers, an armored thug named Dozer.

Kobalt's psychotic gun-toting former partner Harvest enters the fray searching for the witness to a mass murder orchestrated by St. Cloud (he had the gang who bought his resold guns wiped out). He, Kobalt, the federal government (including an agent named Kennel, who can shape-shift into any breed of dog), Dakota police and a psychotic killer named Rabid are all after one Chris Doonan for different reasons. Kobalt wants him alive to talk about what he saw, as do the police. Harvest is crazy enough to kill him to keep him from talking and Rabid was hired to kill him for St. Cloud. His pay is the chance to kill the men who humiliated him in the past. One of them is Kobalt.

One pitched battle later, Kobalt rescues Doonan and escapes with him. Harvest was arrested but escapes custody and flees. Rabid fights off Agent Kennel and his FBI handler and gets away as well. He recognized Kobalt's scent and he now can offer St. Cloud Kobalt's real name in return for what he wants.

St Cloud had Mr. Glass in a safe house with a ton of folks looking for him, including Kobalt, Harvest and Rabid. To Kobalt's dismay, Harvest found Glass first and killed him. With a major threat to his empire gone, St. Cloud turned his attention to getting Kobalt next.

St. Cloud bankrolled Utopia Park, a multi-billion-dollar theme park built on Paris Island, the poorest section of Dakota (they forced out the residents to make it happen). He uses more of his enforcers, led by Crimson and Maneater, for security. The rest of his security team is also enhanced, either with superpowers or with special gadgetry. Dozer, Lead Balloon, Wisp, Bloody Mary, Cutlery, Slipper, Gimlet, Splotch and Angel's Kiss are there ostensibly to keep the park safe, bit their true function is to kill Kobalt when he inevitably arrives seeking to take down St. Cloud.

Kobalt realizes his days are numbered if he continues as is. In a single week, he faced more superhumans than he had in his whole career to date. He always avoided them, but now St Cloud knows he's just a man and vulnerable to his forces. Kobalt takes down the warehouse where he trained Page, destroyed or moved a lot of his equipment and makes plans to disappear before St. Cloud sent someone Kobalt can't defeat. Clover is now healed and assists him in his planning.

Councilman Tyler Page was one of the many local celebrities invited to the opening of Utopia Park. He, of course, brought his wife, his three children and guests of his older two. Rick brought along Michelle Denisi, his longtime crush who recently let him know she had feelings for him too. They were all there at different locations in the park when a riot broke out, led by the Blood Syndicate. Rick got Michelle safely out of the park and with security before he went back in and put on his costume to help out as Page.

Councilman Page called Kobalt to let him know that his son was in the park, and Kobalt assured him that yes, he was most likely in costume, trying to help out. He and Clover went into the park prepared to rescue Page and to enact Kobalt's plan: fake his own death and disappear long enough to train against superhumans before re-emerging.

He and Clover searched the park and were interrupted by an attack by Crimson. Kobalt took his measure, but Crimson was tougher than Kobalt thought and beat him up pretty badly. Clover knocked Crimson out with a sneak attack and left with Kobalt to find Page. They helped him help people trapped by the riot until Crimson posed as a victim and savagely attacked Page. He broke both of Page's arms just to get Kobalt to fight him. Clover set up Kobalt's fake death (a bomb in an already damaged roller coaster) and reluctantly stood by and let Kobalt fight alone. He put up less of a fight than he was capable of so that Crimson thought he had him. Page stepped in and without the use of his broken arms, kicked Crimson to get him off of Kobalt. When Crimson turned to kill Page, Clover distracted him by enacting the plan. She pretended to be a woman trapped on the disabled roller coaster. Crimson went to rescue her as art of his security role and Kobalt shot him in the legs. Kobalt then went to the "rescue" and, with Clover clear, detonated the bomb, faking his death.

== Supporting characters ==
Kobalt's sidekick Page, by artist Jamal Igle.

- Clover: On occasion, she has assisted Kobalt and later became jealous of Page being Kobalt's new sidekick.
- Chris Doonan: A witness whom Harvest tries to convince to talk.
- Dudley: A St. Cloud snitch.
- Harvest: A vigilante more of a psychopath than Kobalt, he was angry about an attack on a school bus and asked Kobalt to help him track Mr. Glass. Later, he kills some crooked cops and tries to convince a witness (Chris Doonan) to talk.
- Mr. Glass: Paid by Milton St. Cloud to kill Kobalt and attacked a school bus of children.
- Page: Kobalt's young protégé, Page's training began as Kobalt tries to break his spirit. He has a crush on a girl named Michelle.
- Page's father: Councilman Tyler Page called in a favor from Kobalt to train his son to be a hero.
- Rachel: Page's sister, she figured out that Page had become a vigilante.
- St. Cloud: A member of the S.Y.S.T.E.M, in issue #9, St. Cloud is trying to frame Kobalt as a crook.
- Kennel: A federal agent with the power to transform into any breed of dog.
