= Cheapjack Shakespeare =

Webcomic by Shaun McLaughlin

Cheapjack Shakespeare is a webcomic and stage play created by Shaun McLaughlin and produced by Gabriel Benson. Though it was initially published as a webcomic, it was adapted from a screenplay and the storyboards for an unproduced film. Cheapjack Shakespeare was later adapted as a play.

== Plot ==
Cheapjack Shakespeare revolves around a college Shakespeare company falling apart as they attempt to stage an outdoor production, with cast members being unfaithful with each other.

== Stage play ==
In June 2010, it was announced that the comic would be produced as a stage play, Cheapjack Shakespeare: The Non-Musical. This premiered in Buffalo, NY on September 9, 2010, at the Alt Theatre, directed by Drew McCabe. The cast included Kristin Bentley, Arin Lee Dandes and Daniel Morris. This production broke sales records for the Alt Theater.

== Reception ==
Comic Attack praised the comic, calling it "heartfelt" and praising the plotting, while noting that the 3D-rendering-style art would put off many people. Jeff Wilber found the tale of amateur dramatics to be true to life, but disliked the art, which is produced using storyboarding software of the kind used in the motion picture industry.
