= Jack Kirby's Galactic Bounty Hunters =

Icon Comics comic book limited series

- Cover of the 1st issue

Publication information
- Publisher: Icon Comics
- Format: Limited series
- Genre: Superhero
- Publication date: July 2006 – November 2007
- No. of issues: 6

Creative team
- Written by: Richard French; Lisa Kirby; Steve Robertson; Michael Thibodeaux
- Penciller(s): Jack Kirby; Michael Thibodeaux
- Inker(s): Scott Hanna; Karl Kesel
- Letterer(s): David Lanphear
- Colorist(s): Wil Quintana
- Editor(s): Tom Brevoort; Molly Lazer; Joe Quesada; Andy Schmidt; Aubrey Sitterson

Collected editions
- Hardcover: ISBN 0-7851-2628-7
- Softcover: ISBN 0-7851-2629-5

Jack Kirby's Galactic Bounty Hunters is a six-issue comic book limited series by Marvel's imprint Icon Comics. It was based on some of Jack Kirby's unpublished ideas.

The series follows the story of Jack Berkley, a former interstellar bounty hunter who must reassemble his former team for one last mission, saving his son.

== Publication history ==
The series was based on unused material Jack Kirby had prepared for the series Captain Victory and the Galactic Rangers #7. The galactic Bounty Hunters were based on early character designs for the Wonder Warriors and Kirby's daughter Lisa found them in his effects after he died and was persuaded by Michael Thibodeaux to work the ideas into a limited series, although initial ideas were for a film or animated television series.

Issue #3 also featured another Kirby creation, Captain Victory.

== Collected editions ==
The series has been collected into a single volume:

- Jack Kirby's Galactic Bounty Hunters (256 pages, hardcover, October 2007, ISBN 0-7851-2628-7, softcover, July 2008, ISBN 0-7851-2629-5)
