= Eric Battle =

American illustrator

- Born: Philadelphia, Pennsylvania, U.S.
- Area: Artist

Eric Battle is an American illustrator. Battle's body of work consists mainly of contemporary American-style comic illustrations and fully painted illustration for publishing. He has illustrated numerous iconic characters for DC Comics and Marvel Comics including Spider-Man, Batman, the Flash, Green Arrow, Green Lantern, and Wonder Woman.

Battle has appeared frequently as a panelist at the East Coast Black Age of Comics Convention, on WHAT 1340 AM, and been interviewed by Hard Knock Radio, The Philadelphia Inquirer, and Black America Web.

== Career ==
=== Early career ===
Battle gained his professional comics start pencilling Kobalt for Milestone Media following Arvell Jones, the original penciller of the title. When Kobalt was canceled, Battle was assigned to pencil Hardware, one of Milestone's flagship titles.

=== After Milestone ===
Following Milestone, Battle began freelancing for DC Comics, and soon after Marvel Comics. Battle has also illustrated commercially on a variety of projects. including artwork based on characters created by the writer Leslie Esdaile Banks (a.k.a. L.A. Banks).

=== Recent work ===
Battle's recent works include The Scourge, from The Walking Dead producer Gale Anne Hurd and writer Scott Lobdell.

== Bibliography ==
=== Comics ===
- Kobalt (Milestone Media)
- Hardware (Milestone Media)
- The Spectre (DC Comics)
- The Scourge (Aspen Comics)
