= Dave Stone =

British writer (born 1964)

- Born: 12 June 1964 (age 62)
- Occupation: Writer
- Writing career
- Period: 1991–present
- Genre: Science fiction
- Website: www.pseudopod.empty-spaces.net

Dave Stone (born 12 June 1964) is a British science fiction writer.

== Biography ==
Stone has written many spin off novels based on the BBC science fiction television series Doctor Who and Judge Dredd.

Stone also contributed a number of comic series appearing in 2000 AD and in the Judge Dredd Megazine, focusing on the Judge Dredd universe. In collaboration with David Bishop and artist Shaky Kane he produced the much disliked Soul Sisters. Working independently, he created the better received Armitage, a take on Inspector Morse set in a future London, and also contributed to the ongoing Judge Hershey series.

== Bibliography ==
=== Comics ===
Comics work includes:

- Armitage:
  - "Armitage" (with Sean Phillips, in Judge Dredd Megazine #1.09-14, 1991)
  - "The Case of the Detonating Dowager" (with Sean Phillips, in Judge Dredd Yearbook 1993, 1992)
  - "Influential Circles" (with Charlie Adlard, in Judge Dredd Megazine #2 10-2.18, 1992)
  - "Flashback" (with Charlie Adlard, in Judge Dredd Megazine #2 19-2.21, 1993)
  - "Flashback II" (with Charlie Adlard, in Judge Dredd Megazine #2.31-2.33, 1993)
  - "City of the Dead Prologue" (with Peter Doherty, in Judge Dredd Megazine #2.63, 1994)
  - "City of the Dead" (with Charles Gillespie, in Judge Dredd Megazine #2.64-2.71, 1994–1995)
  - "Little Assassins" (with Adrian Salmon, in Judge Dredd Mega Special 1996)
  - "Bodies of Evidence" (with Steve Yeowell, in Judge Dredd Megazine #3.64-67, 2000)
  - "Apostasy in the UK" (with John Ridgway, in Judge Dredd Megazine #212-213, 2003)
  - "Dumb Blond" (with John Cooper, in Judge Dredd Megazine #266-270, 2008)
  - "The Mancunian Candidate" (with John Cooper, in Judge Dredd Megazine #285-290, 2009)
  - "The Unpleasantness at the Tontine Club" (with John Cooper, in Judge Dredd Megazine #300-301, 2010)
  - "Underground" (with Patrick Goddard, in Judge Dredd Megazine #318-321, 2012)
- Strange Cases: "Demonspawn" (with Kev Hopgood, in Judge Dredd Yearbook 1992, September 1991)
- Soul Sisters (with Shaky Kane):
  - "Soul Sisters" (co-written with David Bishop, in Judge Dredd Megazine #2.02-2.09, 1992)
  - "Untitled" (in Judge Dredd Yearbook 1993, 1992)
- Judge Hershey: "Down Time" (with Paul Peart, in Judge Dredd Megazine #2.09, 1992)
- Hershey & Steel: "Degenomancer" (with Charlie Adlard, in Judge Dredd Megazine #2.35-2.36, 1993)
- Tracer (with Paul Peart, in 2000 AD #948-949, 1995)

=== Novels ===
==== Judge Dredd ====
- Deathmasques (1993)
- The Medusa Seed (1994)
- Wetworks (1995)
- Psykogeddon (2006)

==== Virgin New Adventures ====
- Sky Pirates! (1995)
- Death and Diplomacy (1996)
- Ship of Fools (1997)
- Oblivion (1998)
- The Mary-Sue Extrusion (1998)
- Return to the Fractured Planet (1999)

==== Virgin Missing Adventures ====
- Burning Heart (1996)

==== Past Doctor Adventures ====
- Heart of TARDIS (2000)

==== Eighth Doctor Adventures ====
- The Slow Empire (2001)

==== Telos Doctor Who novellas ====
- Citadel of Dreams (2002)

==== Bernice Summerfield ====
- The Infernal Nexus (2001)
- The Two Jasons (2007)

==== Other ====
- Golgotha Run (Dark Future) (2005)

=== Audio plays ===
==== Bernice Summerfield ====
- The Green-Eyed Monsters (2002)
- The Worst Thing in the World (2006)
- The End of the World (2007)
