= Xombi =

Fictional comics character

- David Kim, artist J.J. Birch.

Publication information
- Publisher: DC Comics
- First appearance: Xombi #0 (January 1994)
- Created by: John Rozum (writer); Denys Cowan (artist)

In-story information
- Alter ego: David Kim
- Abilities: Immortality via nanotechnology

Xombi (David Kim) is a superhero published by DC Comics. He first appeared in Xombi #0 (January 1994) and was created by John Rozum and Denys Cowan.

== Fictional character biography ==
David Kim is a Korean-American scientist from West Orange, New Jersey who developed regenerative nanotechnology. Before Kim can test his invention, a villain named Dr. Sugarman breaks into his lab and attempts to steal the virus. In the ensuing fight, Kim is critically injured and his assistant Kelly injects him with the virus in an attempt to save his life. However, the nanites use available matter to restore Kim, partially devouring Kelly in the process. Kim became a "xombi" - a potentially immortal, technologically enhanced human being. This embroiled him in the affairs of various races of supernatural beings that secretly lived among humanity for millennia, known collectively as the shadow worlds.

Due to the combined effect of the destruction and recreation of the multiverse and the timeline-altering powers of Anansi, a new divergent timeline is created in which David Kim became a Green Lantern instead of Hal Jordan. Kim is one of a group of alternate Justice League members who help restore the original timeline.

In Final Crisis, Orion kills his father Darkseid, destabilizing the multiverse. Dharma transfers the Milestone characters to the DC universe, altering history so that they always existed there.

A second Xombi series debuted in DC Comics in May 2011, and ran for six issues, which were collected in a trade paperback. It was written by John Rozum, with art by Frazer Irving.

== Powers and abilities ==
Xombi is nearly immortal due to the nanomachines in his body, which heal injuries and prevent aging and disease. He can control the nanomachines to disassemble and reassemble matter, transmuting it.

== Supporting characters ==
- Becan is an oracle who David Kim/Xombi and Rabbi Sinnowitz meet in a bar.
- Bludgeon is a member of the Beli Mah (School of Anguish).
- Catholic Girl is a teenage Catholic school girl who can fly, can project a force field around herself, and fire bolts of energy. The origin of her powers is unknown, but she views them as a heavenly gift.
- Cheryl Saltz is an employee of Alva Technologies who tests Xombi's immortality.
- Chet is a friend of David Kim.
- Cole is a salesman who arranges for Manual Dexterity to murder Lenore Duncan.
- Crowne is the leader of the Beli Mah (School of Anguish).
- Dalila Rose is David Kim's fiancée.
- Dumaka is a Xombi who gained his abilities from African folk magic. After David convinces him of the downsides of immortality, Dumaka gives up his abilities and dies.
- ENIAC is a computer who gains sentience and contacts Cheryl Saltz of Alva Technologies, wanting to be connected to the information superhighway. Xombi attempts an exorcism on ENIAC, which does not work, but Cheryl manages to stop ENIAC herself.
- Homunculi is a group of ghostly insects who serve Dr. Sugarman. They were created from remnants of insects who died after being trapped between windows.
- Julian Parker is a demonic ally of David Kim/Xombi and Rabbi Sinnowitz.
- Kameko an ancient xombi. When Rabbi Sinnowitz takes David to meet her, she reveals that she was expecting him because she loves him dearly. They have a long talk concerning the future as Kameko has seen it; the story Kameko tells is one were David destroys the world with his technology. She tells him of the time when they will meet in 80 years. David refuses to accept the future that Kameko describes and leaves.
- Kelly Sanborne is David Kim's lab assistant.
- Lord of Fumes is a villain who escapes from the Garden of Spires at the end of issue #2/beginning of issue #3.
- Manuel Dexterity is the brother of Manuella Dexterity, who Cole sends to murder Lenore Duncan.
- Manuella Dexterity is the sister of Manuel Dexterity, who attempts to kill Xombi following his death.
- Nun of the Above is a clairvoyant nun and associate of Catholic Girl.
- Nun the Less is a sister in the same religious order as Nun of the Above who developed the supernatural ability to shrink to small size after eating a bad shrimp.
- Rabbi Sinnowitz is an ally of David Kim/Xombi. He is an occult practitioner with penchant for Golem manufacture and control. Sinnowitz became involved in the shadow worlds when he and his wife battled the Kinderessen and their unborn child was killed.
- Rats of Undertown/the Rat Congress are guest-starring from Blood Syndicate associates of the Boogieman (a member of the Blood Syndicate). A riot starts as the rats organize to fight the Kinderessen, and the fight took place in the middle of the Utopia Park Riot.
- Sheer Shears are malevolent abstracts shaped like hooded figures with beak-like sheers in place of heads. They are immune to anything that is derived from written knowledge, but can be destroyed from creative application of oral tradition and folklore.
