= Douwe Dabbert =

Dutch fantasy comic series

Publication information
- Publisher: Big Balloon
- Genre: Fantasy comics, Children's comics
- Publication date: 1975 - 2001 (Netherlands); 2021 (USA)
- No. of issues: 23 albums

Creative team
- Written by: Thom Roep
- Artist(s): Piet Wijn

Douwe Dabbert is a Dutch fantasy comics series by artist Piet Wijn and scenarist Thom Roep. It was published in the Netherlands between 1975 and 2001, and in the United States beginning in 2021.

== Concept ==
Douwe Dabbert is a fantasy comic set in an undetermined past, though in two stories "De Weg naar west" ("The Way to West") and "De zee naar zuid" ("The Sea to South") he meets representatives of the West-Indische Compagnie, which would put those of his adventures before 1792. But then in "De tanden van Casius Gaius"("The teeth of Casius Gaius") we see the royal Dutch coat of arms which would make that one and the following adventures take place after 1815 as that was the year the kingdom of Netherlands was created. Despite the historical context the comic makes use of many fantastic elements such as witchcraft, fictitious kingdoms and anthropomorphic animals.

== List of characters ==
- Douwe Dabbert: The series' protagonist. He is a small bearded man who has the appearance of a gnome. He might be one himself, seeing that at the start of one story, "Het Bedrog van Balthasar", he is seen saying goodbye to Paulus the woodgnome, a character from another comics series, who almost has the same size as him. Furthermore, Douwe has a magical knapsack from which only he can conjure items that are helpful in any situation. When others try to use it to their own advantage the bag only produces water, sand or nothing at all. Dabbert is depicted as a roaming traveller. We never learn anything about his family, except that he inherited his knapsack from his grandfather. His name is alliterative because the publishers of Donald Duck felt this was in line with their other titles. The name "Dabbert" was thought up when thinking of the wardrobe of Sinterklaas, which is called a "tabberd" in Dutch.
- Pief
  Pief: Pief is a sorcerer's apprentice. He thinks he is quite a master in magic, but still makes a lot of mistakes. Douwe acts like a father figure to him. Pief and his family appear in Het flodderwerk van Pief, as well as in many subsequent books. The book De zwarte kimono is about Pief's adventures in the East.
- Domoli: Pief's nephew. He is an obese little sorcerer's apprentice who is only interested in food.
- Kijfje: Pief's niece and Domoli's sister. She is a slender and somewhat crabby girl.
- Ludo Lafhart: A crook who wants to become rich. He is one of Douwe's most recurring antagonists, appearing in the albums "De Verwende Prinses" ("The Spoiled Princess"), "Het Verborgen Dierenrijk" ("The Hidden Animal Kingdom") and "Het Monster van het Mistmeer" ("The Monster of the Misty Lake").
- Knudde: Lafhart's servant. He is depicted as his slightly more stupid sidekick.
- Wredulia: An evil witch who appears in the stories "De Poort naar oost" ("The Gate to East") and "De Schacht naar noord" ("The Shaft to North").
- Prinses Pauline: A spoiled princess who appears in the first story. She was originally meant as the protagonist, but after thirteen pages Dabbert makes his entry in the series and she is never seen again until the final album.
- Dodo: A dodo whom Douwe met at the North Pole, searching for a dodo egg. Finally, they find a dodo egg on a desert island, so the dodo can reproduce himself. He appears in "De Schacht naar het Noorden" en "De Weg naar het Westen".
- Berendsz en Knielsen: Two sailors who try to steal Douwe's knapsack. They appear in "De zee naar zuid" ("The Sea to South").

== Publication history ==
Between 1975 and 2001 the series was published without interruption. They were pre-published in small episodes in the Dutch magazine Donald Duck. All longer stories have been published in 23 comic book albums afterwards. Some shorter stories exist too, but haven't been published in the regular series yet. Piet Wijn drew all the stories personally, except for the final one, which was partially done by Dick Matena, due to Wijn's health problems at the time, which would lead to his death in 2010.

The first English-language edition of Douwe Dabbert was published in 2021 by Creston Books. "Douwe Dabbert" is changed to "Dusty Dabbert" in the American version. Currently, "The Secret Animal Kingdom" is the only title available in English.

== Albums ==
1. "De verwende prinses" (1977) ("The spoiled princess")
2. "Het verborgen dierenrijk" (1977) ("The secret animal kingdom")
3. "De valse heelmeester" (1978) ("The deceitful healer")
4. "De poort naar oost" (1978) ("The gate to the east")
5. "Het monster van het Mistmeer" (1979) ("The monster of the Fog Lake")
6. "De schacht naar noord" (1979) ("The shaft to the north")
7. "De weg naar west" (1980) ("The road to the west")
8. "De zee naar zuid" (1981) ("The sea to the south")
9. "Florijn de flierefluiter" (1982) (Florijn the loafer")
10. "De tanden van Casius Gaius" (1983) ("The teeth of Casius Gaius")
11. "Het flodderwerk van Pief" (1984) ("The messy work of Pief")
12. "De laatste plager" (1985) ("The last teaser"), includes a Christmas story
13. "De heksen van eergisteren" (1986) ("The witches of the day before yesterday")
14. "Op het spoor van kwade zaken" (1988) ("On the trail of evil things"), short stories
15. "Het bedrog van Balthasar" (1990) ("The deceit of Balthasar")
16. "De dame in de lijst" (1991) ("The lady in the frame")
17. "Bombasto met het boze oog" (1992) ("Bombasto and the evil eye"), short stories
18. "De kast met duizend deuren" (1993) ("The closet with a thousand doors"), with a short story within a story
19. "Het schip van ijs" (1994) ("The ship made of ice")
20. "De zwarte kimono" (1995) ("The black Kimono")
21. "Het gemaskerde opperhoofd" (1996) ("The masked chieftain")
22. "Terug naar het verborgen dierenrijk" (1997) ("Back to the secret animal kingdom")
23. "De wonderlijke raamvertelling" (2001) ("The amazing frame story"), two adventures in one story.
