= The X-Files (comics) =

Comics

- Images from the comic The X-Files Special by Frank Spotnitz

Publication information
- Publisher: Topps Comics; Devil's Due Digital
- Schedule: Monthly
- Format: Ongoing series
- Genre: Gothic science fiction
- Publication date: January 1995 – September 1998
- No. of issues: 41 regular monthly issues 2 annuals 3 digests 1 graphic novel 1 book adaptation

Creative team
- Written by: Stefan Petrucha; John Rozum; Kevin J. Anderson; Dwight Jon Zimmerman; Frank Spotnitz
- Artist(s): Charles Adlard; Brian Denham
- Penciller(s): Gordon Purcell; Alex Saviuk
- Inker(s): Josef Rubinstein; Rick Magyar; Larry Mahlstedt

Collected editions
- Volume 1: ISBN 1-883313-10-4
- Volume 2: ISBN 1-883313-23-6

The X-Files was a spin-off from the television series of the same name, originally published by Topps Comics and, most recently, DC Comics imprint Wildstorm.

== Publication history ==
The first series was published by Topps Comics and ran for 41 issues from January 1995 to September 1998, coinciding with the second through fifth seasons of the television program.

In 1996, Topps published X-Files #0, an adaptation of the pilot episode, in order to test the market for a series adapting the episodes of the X-Files TV series. The issue was successful, and X-Files Season One ran for nine issues (August 1997 – July 1998). The series's name was provisional, and Topps in fact intended to adapt every episode, but never got as far as season two. The series was written by Roy Thomas, who would create a first draft for each issue by working off of the episode's script, then watch the actual episode and modify his work to account for changes made on the set.

Topps also published Ground Zero, a four-issue mini-series (December 1997 – March 1998).

Tony Isabella reported difficulties with The X-Files creator Chris Carter over the Topps Comics' series:

"The main reason the comics fell behind schedule was because it took so long to satisfy the X-Files people. They went over everything with a fine-tooth comb, including the letters columns... I rarely ran negative letters in these columns because the [Topps] editors were afraid that the X-Files people would want even more changes in the material. Almost from the start, there were never enough usable letters for our needs. That's why I started including the "Deep Postage" news items—and making up letters completely. I also wrote the Xena letters columns, but those were a lot easier to produce."

The digest consisted of three issues published at five month intervals beginning December 1995 through September 1996, each featuring separate titles: "Big Foot, Warm Heart", "Dead to the World", and "Scape Goats". All included stories from Ray Bradbury Comics.

There were also a number of one-offs like the Hero Illustrated Special (March 1995), and the graphic novel Afterflight (August 1997).

Wildstorm published The X-Files Special in August 2008. It was a one-shot timed with the release of the second film, written by Frank Spotnitz with art by Brian Denham. The deal Spotnitz signed was for another two comics. This became a six-part series that ran from November 2008 to April 2009 with Spotnitz writing the first two issues, Marv Wolfman for #3–4, and Doug Moench for #5–6. Wildstorm then teamed with IDW to publish The X-Files/30 Days of Night to positive reviews from July 2010. The six-issue limited series is written by 30 Days of Night creator Steve Niles and Tool guitarist Adam Jones and follows Mulder and Scully to Alaska to investigate a series of grisly murders that may be linked to vampires. IDW then went on in July 2013 to begin publishing The X-Files Season 10 as an ongoing series reuniting Mulder and Scully with creator Chris Carter returning as executive producer. This was followed by the eight-issue The X-Files Season 11 in 2015.

By the end of 2016, IDW Publishing has re-released all the previous Topps comics in collected form.

== Creative contributors ==
=== Original series ===
==== Writers ====
- Stefan Petrucha

Issues #1–16
Annual #1
Digests #1 and 2
Afterflight

- John Rozum

Issues #17–19, 22–39, and 41
Annual #2
Digest #3

- Kevin J. Anderson

Issues #20 and 21
Ground Zero

- Dwight Jon Zimmerman

Issue #40

==== Artist ====
- Charles Adlard

Issues #1–16, 18, 19, 22, 23, and 27–29
Annual #1
Digests #1–3

==== Pencillers ====
- Gordon Purcell

Issues #17, 20, 21, and 24–29
Annual #2
Ground Zero

- Alex Saviuk

Issues 30–41
Afterflight
Ground Zero

==== Inkers ====
- Josef Rubenstein

Issues #17, 20, 21, and 24–29
Annual #2

- Rick Magyar

Issues #30–41
Afterflight

- Larry Mahlstedt

Ground Zero

==== Cover artists ====
- Miran Kim

Issues #1–32 and 34–41
Annuals #1 and 2
Digests #1–3
Afterflight

- George Pratt

Issue #33
Ground Zero

== Plot ==
The three digests contained stories on Bigfoot, the Count of St. Germain and the Chupacabra, respectively.

Afterflight dealt with elements of the mystery airship flap.

Fight the Future was the official film adaptation, "Fight the Future" being the film's subtitle used to differentiate it from the television series.

Season One adapted some of the episodes from the first season: "Pilot", "Deep Throat", "Squeeze", "Conduit", "Ice", "Space", "Fire", "Beyond the Sea" and "Shadows". Two others, "The Jersey Devil" and "Ghost in the Machine", were solicited but never published.

Despite coinciding with the film, The X-Files Special will not be an adaptation but is set in what the writer calls "the classic period of the X-Files" – between Season 2 and Season 5. While this is a stand-alone story, he will be writing two more which fit into the broader conspiracy theory that developed, saying "the next ones that I am going to write tie into the mythology of the show not in a way that changes the path but deepens it a little bit."

== Collected editions ==
The series has been collected into trade paperbacks. In the U.K., Titan Books did a near-complete run (which in the U.S. Topps Comics run stopped at #12) but recently Checker Book Publishing started publishing the rest (although they re-started the numbering again).

- The X-Files Collection (Topps Comics):
  - Volume 1 (collects The X-Files #1–6 and The X-Files/Hero Illustrated Special, Berkley Publishing Group, February 1996, ISBN 1-883313-10-4)
  - Volume 2 (collects The X-Files #7–12 and Annual #1, 180 pages, February 1997, ISBN 1-883313-23-6)
- Checker Book Publishing:
  - Volume 1 (collects #13–17, "Squeeze" and #0 "Pilot Episode", May 2005, ISBN 1-933160-02-0, Titan Books, July 2008, ISBN 1-84856-128-8)
  - Volume 2 (collects #18–22, #1/2 and Digest #1, May 2005, ISBN 1-933160-03-9, Titan Books, July 2008, ISBN 1-84856-129-6)
  - Volume 3 (collects #23–26, Fire, Ice and Hero Illustrated Special "Trick of the Light", December 2005, ISBN 1-933160-39-X)
- Titan Books:
  - Firebird (by Stefan Petrucha, with art by Charlie Adlard, collects The X-Files #1–6 and The X-Files/Hero Illustrated Special "Trick of the Light", 160 pages, November 1995, ISBN 1-900097-08-7)
  - Project Aquarius (by Stefan Petrucha, with art by Charlie Adlard, collects The X-Files #7–12, 151 pages, August 1996, ISBN 1-900097-17-6)
  - The Haunting (by Stefan Petrucha, with art by Charlie Adlard, collects The X-Files #12–16, 160 pages, March 1997, ISBN 1-900097-23-0)
  - Night Light (by Kevin J. Anderson and John Rozum, with art by Charlie Adlard and Gordon Purcell, collects The X-Files #17- 21, 128 pages, March 1997, ISBN 1-85286-808-2)
  - Internal Affairs (by John Rozum, with art by Charlie Adlard, collects The X-Files #22–23, 128 pages, August 1997, ISBN 1-85286-809-0)
  - Remote Control (by John Rozum, with art by Charlie Adlard, collects The X-Files #24–29, 160 pages, November 1997, ISBN 1-85286-840-6)
  - Skin Deep (by John Rozum, with art by Alex Saviuk, collects The X-Files #30–33, 128 pages, April 1998, ISBN 1-85286-951-8)

Other volumes include:

- Dead to the World (by Stefan Petrucha with Charlie Adlard, collects Digests #1–3, 208 pages, Titan Books, April 1996, ISBN 1-900097-24-9)
- Afterflight (by Stefan Petrucha, with art by Jill Thompson, Alexander Saviuk and Rick Magyar, graphic novel, Topps, August 1997, Titan Books, October 1997, ISBN 1-85286-860-0)

The Wildstorm comics are also being collected:

- The X-Files (176 pages, Wildstorm, November 2009, ISBN 1-4012-2527-6)

=== Digital editions ===
The X-Files series is released digitally exclusively through Devil's Due Digital.

== Reception ==
A review of the first Checker Book volume is complimentary about the writing and art, but scathing about the production values of the book itself, stating that "this collection from Checker reflects a lack of editorial control, poor workmanship, and generally shoddy values".
