= Royal National Hotel =

3-star hotel in Central London

Coordinates: 51.5236°N 0.1271°W

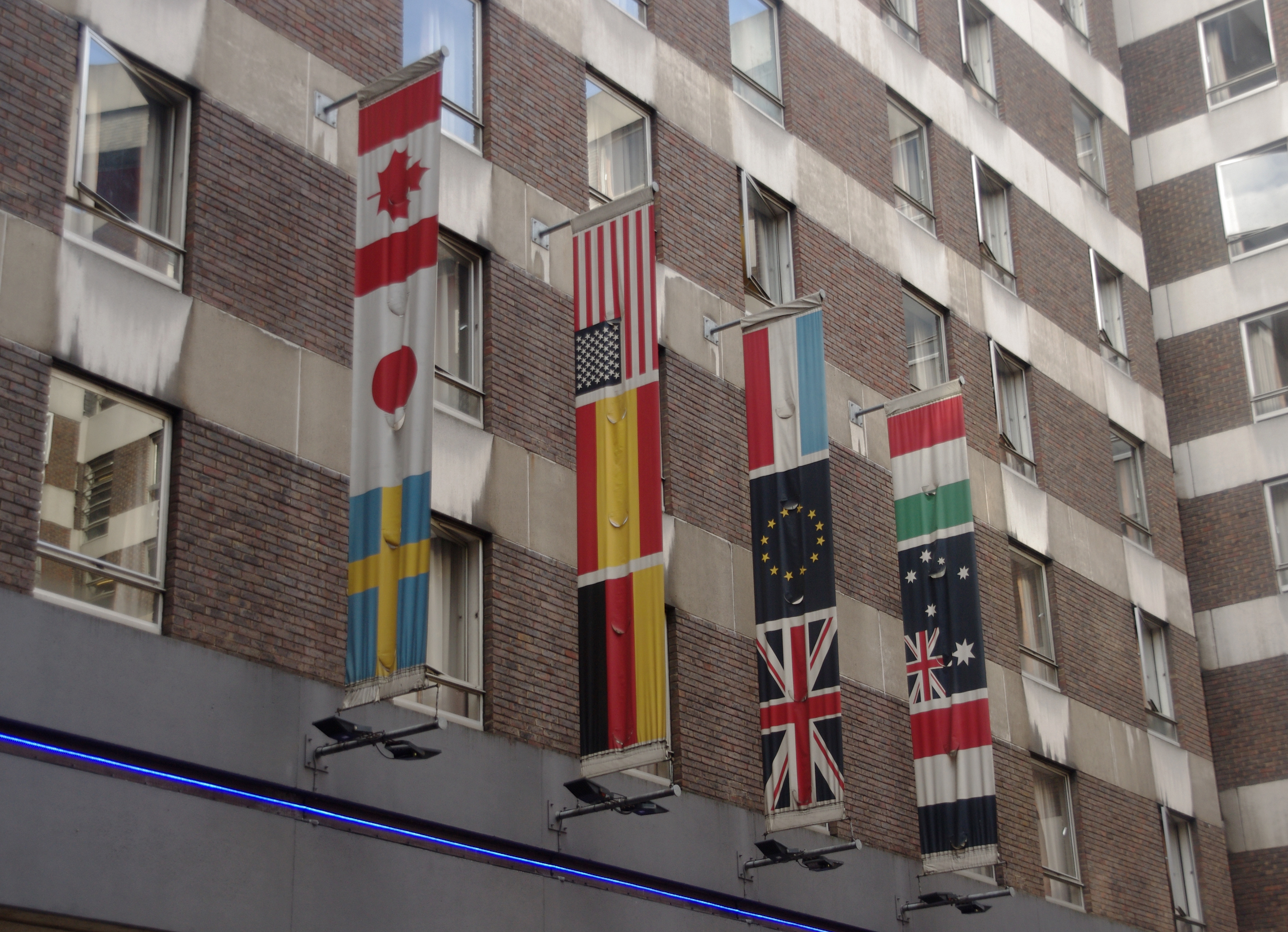
Royal National Hotel

The Royal National Hotel is a 3-star hotel in Woburn Place, Bloomsbury, central London, England. It is the largest hotel in the United Kingdom by number of rooms, numbering 1,630. It is eight storeys tall.

== See also ==
- List of largest hotels in Europe
