= Piet Wijn =

Dutch comics creator

Pieter Cornelis Wijn (17 May 1929 – 6 October 2010) was a prolific Dutch comics creator.

Wijn was born in Hilversum. His creations include the cartoon versions of Marten Toonder's Tom Puss and Kappie, Gloria van Goes, Douwe Dabbert, and many other cartoons. He was awarded the Stripschapsprijs in 1984. He died in Leidschendam.
