= Digital Comic Museum =

Digital library of comic books

- Website: digitalcomicmuseum.com
- Launched: 2010

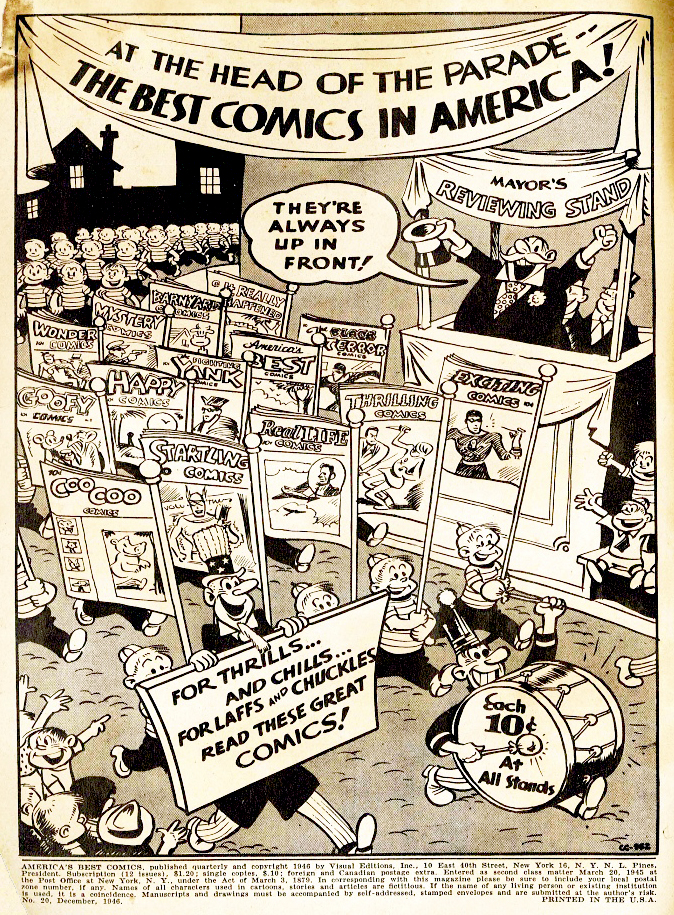
American comics 2002.jpg

Digital Comic Museum is a digital library of comic books in the public domain, established in 2010.
