= ALT Theatre =

American theater company

Coordinates: 42°56′32″N 78°52′35″W

ALT Theatre is an American theater company founded in 2007, that has been noted as a leader of ground-breaking new works in contemporary theatre and dance. The company is dedicated to producing new contemporary-style plays that involve not only the traditional theatre elements, but also elements in media and contemporary dance. Located at 255 Great Arrow Avenue in Buffalo, New York, the ALT Theatre provided an intimate blackbox setting and makes the theatre experience more inviting and accessible. Multiple different performances have taken place at the theatre, including aerial dances.

The ALT Theatre's productions have been nominated for multiple Artie awards over the years, winning in 3 categories.
