= Stan Lee Foundation =

American literacy and arts charity

The Stan Lee Foundation
- Formation: 2010 (original initiative); 2025 (current nonprofit organization)
- Type: Nonprofit organization
- Legal status: 501(c)(3) public charity
- Chairman: Michael Jaffa
- Managing Director: Chaz Rainey
- Director: Bob Sabouni
- Website: stanlee.foundation

The Stan Lee Foundation is an American 501(c)(3) public charity dedicated to literacy and the narrative arts in honor of Stan Lee. Its mission includes supporting readers, writers and comic book creators, and preserving the cultural heritage of comics and storytelling.

== Background ==
A foundation bearing Stan Lee's name was launched in 2010, with Lee attending its launch at Nasdaq MarketSite. The current nonprofit organization was established on February 6, 2025, and received tax-exempt status under Section 501(c)(3) of the Internal Revenue Code.

== Leadership ==
As of September 2026, the Foundation's board consists of Michael Jaffa, chairman and director; Chaz Rainey, managing director; and Bob Sabouni, director. All directors serve on a volunteer basis. Rainey oversees day-to-day operations.

== Activities ==
The Foundation supports charitable partners and is developing programs of its own. Its announced plans include a comic book literacy program for early readers, scholarships for young writers, and mentorship pairing emerging writers with experienced professionals.

In August 2026, Colossal announced Super Kid, a fundraising competition operated on behalf of the charity DTCare to benefit the Foundation.
