= Secret City Saga =

Collection of comic book titles

Secret City Saga is a concept and collection of various comic book titles created by American writer and artist Jack Kirby, and published by the short-lived Topps Comics, an offshoot of the Topps Trading Card company. Beginning in April 1993, the Secret City Saga books consisted of three four-issue miniseries (Jack Kirby's Secret City Saga, Satan's Six, TeenAgents) and three one-shot specials (Captain Glory, NightGlider, and Bombast), which were all preceded by the one-shot promotional giveaway, Jack Kirby's Secret City Saga #0.

The concept itself saw Topps lease Kirby's name alongside the characters, and saw the line referred to as "The Kirbyverse". All the characters resided in the same shared universe, and the deal also presented the final time that Kirby had complete creative control over any of the many properties that he had created in his career. It was initially seen as a creative and financial failure. The line consisted of leftover concepts Kirby had developed years prior, and generated low sales and minimal reader interest, finding a niche only with hard-core Kirby fans.

== The Secret City ==
The Secret City Saga chronicled the adventures of three heroes, Captain Glory, NightGlider and Bombast. As revealed in Jack Kirby's Secret City Saga #0 (April 1993), at some point in pre-recorded history "fifteen millennia before our own", there existed a race of beings known as "the Ninth Men". "Ninth Men" is part of Kirby's fictional concept that civilized human society tends to repeat itself in cycles, starting off in a primitive state and later evolving and advancing in intelligence and technology until factors such as greed and arrogance then lead to said society's collapse and destruction, only to be replaced later by another race of humanoids, who tend to repeat the mistakes (unknowingly) of the prior society. This is also a theme that Kirby touched upon briefly in his more popular Fourth World books published by DC Comics in the early 1970s.

The Ninth Men populated Gazra, a society which advanced to the point in which it was harvesting the full potential of an integrated community, with its technological advancements having been made with an organic theme, instead of machine-based. Yet their environment itself seemed to turn against them in the form of huge, nearly planet-wide storms destroying all in their path. As a contingency, the scientific and military leaders of Gazra placed three of their citizens into hibernation, with hopes that these three would survive "the Great Catastrophe" (a term used for these planet-wide storms) to spread the ideals of the society of the Ninth Men onto the next age of Man, which is revealed to be present-day humankind.

The three citizens were:

- Keltan, a captain in Gazra's Science Team security forces, who upon awakening would assume the name Captain Glory.
- Glida, who upon release from hibernation would assume the name NightGlider. As indicated in Secret City Saga #0, this may have been an "official" term for her and/or her kin during her days in Gazra, for she possesses bodily modification that would foster the abilities of flight, such as a hollow bone structure.
- Bombast, who seems to have been a member of Gazra's military, possibly of some sort of demolitions or heavy ordnance team, whose official term seems to have been "hurlers". He is skilled at ballistics and explosives.

== The Kirbyverse ==
The four-issue Secret City Saga miniseries told the story of the three Ninth Men's first adventure in the present day. After release from hibernation, they discover and attempt to foil a plot whose origin lay in the last days of Gazra, involving an evil duplicate of then-President Bill Clinton.

== Other residents of the Kirbyverse ==
Satan's Six were a team of agents of the Kirbyverse's interpretation of Satan himself, created for the sole purpose of causing chaos in the mortal plane, but the continued incompetence of the members always seemed to be their downfall (and humanity's benefit). Members included: Brian Bluedragon, a doltish knight of Arthur's court; Hard Luck Harrigan, a petty gambler and bookie who worked in the 1930s criminal underworld; Dr. Mordius, a Henry Jekyll wannabe; Kuga the Lion-Killer, a warrior of African origin; Dezira, of ancient Babylon; and Frightful, a demon in Satan's employ whose job it was to keep the members in line, a "drill instructor from Hell", so to speak.

The TeenAgents were a group of four teenaged denizens of the Inner City populated by descendants of humans who fled the surface world from persecution as witches and warlocks and discovered and salvaged remnants of the Ninth Men's world that somehow survived "the Great Catastrophe". Their job was to intervene should any of the wild (and most times, monstrous) creatures that populate the bowels of the Earth try to attack the surface world (or as they referred to it, "Upworld"). After speculation, it might be safe to say that these subterranean creatures might possibly have been some of the "ordinary" wildlife that populated the Ninth Men's prehistoric times. Members of the TeenAgents included: Aurik, who possessed the power to control his own mass and density; Dijit, a sardonic lad who possessed four-fingered cybernetic gloves, each individual finger being endowed with the ability to project a different form of force bolt (fire, electricity, etc.); Seera, a young woman who could transform herself into a vaporous state, allowing her the ability of flight (and seemed to have slight empathic abilities); and The Kreech, the youngest and most enthusiastic member of the team, a girl with shapeshifting powers.

Silver Star, a previous Kirby creation, was a government agent appointed the task of fighting superhuman enemies. A genetic mutant, classified as Homo geneticus, Morgan Miller was the result of genetic experimentation of his father, Dr. Bradford Miller. Possessing incredible superhuman strength, Miller's abilities are also a curse, for each time he uses his powers it physically drains his life force. Miller is quoted to have said, "What's up with this super secret shenanigans?"

Captain Victory, another of Kirby's previous independent comic book endeavours. Victory is the leader of an extraterrestrial intergalactic police force, which visits then-present day (1982) Earth. With the publication of Victory #1, though, it seems that Victory's Pacific Comics' exploits are, continuity-wise, difficult to reconcile with the Kirbyverse's "present" (supposedly circa early 1990s).

== Loose ends ==
What would have become the final two installments of the Secret City Saga, a new Silver Star four-issue miniseries, and a new Capt. Victory book, Victory, billed as a five-issue miniseries, only saw the publication of the first issues before the plug was pulled on the books. The final three issues of each have yet to be published. Silver Star, the Secret City heroes and Captain Victory resurfaced in 2011 in Kirby: Genesis, written by Kurt Busiek, who was also the author of the never-published Silver Star issues.
