= Critical Millennium =

- Date: October 2010
- Page count: 160 pages
- Publisher: Archaia Studios Press

Creative team
- Writers: Andrew E. C. Gaska
- Artists: Daniel Dussault

Critical Millennium is a 2010 graphic novel published by Archaia Studios Press. It is written by Andrew E. C. Gaska and illustrated by Daniel Dussault.

== Plot summary ==
The Black Rabbit's self-styled captain, Thomm Ander Coney, is intent on taking to the stars with the notion that humanity has ruined its homeworld, but can use the lessons of the past to create a utopia out in the universe. He is, of course, utterly wrong. The historical missteps of Earth's explorers and pioneers can not help but be repeated on other worlds—many by Coney himself—as he and his crew blindly wreck civilizations and destroy cultures that existed millennia before mankind visited the stars, all for a perceived greater good.
