= Arvell Jones =

American comics artist

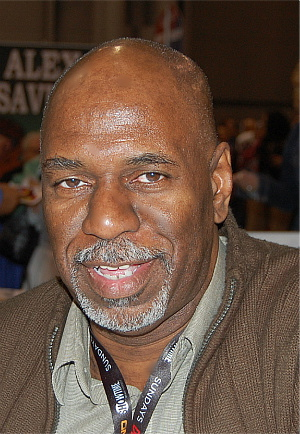
- Jones in October 2011
- Born: Arvell Malcolm Jones; September 5
- Area: Penciller
- Notable works: All-Star Squadron; Misty Knight

Arvell Jones (whose earliest work is billed Arvell Malcolm Jones) is an American comics artist best known for his work for Marvel Comics and for DC Comics and its imprint Milestone Media.

== Biography ==
Jones and his brother, Desmond, were raised in Detroit, Michigan, and were both active in early comic book fandom. Along with fellow Detroiters and future comics professionals Rich Buckler, Tom Orzechowski, Keith Pollard, Jim Starlin, Al Milgrom, Michael Netzer, and others, Jones worked on the Detroit Triple Fan Fair, one of the earliest comic book conventions, and published the local fanzine Fan Informer; it lasted into 1971. Jones in 2006 recalled how he and his compatriots "would take a 13-hour drive and spend the night with Al Milgrom and his roommate, hang at Rich [Buckler]'s, then go see [art director] John Romita at Marvel, get our butts spanked, and go back to Detroit to work on our samples again."

Jones entered the comics industry as an assistant for Buckler, the first of the Detroit group to enter the field professionally. After helping Buckler on the Black Panther and the Buckler-created cyborg antihero Deathlok, Jones received his first published credit, for art assistance, along with Pollard, on the Buckler-pencilled Thor #228 (cover dated October 1974). He then did pencil "breakdowns"—layouts that break down the plot elements—for all but page one of the 18-page team-up story "The Return of the Living Eraser", starring the Thing and Morbius, the Living Vampire, for Dick Giordano's finished pencils. This eventually ran in Marvel Two-in-One #15 (May 1976). After drawing a spot illustration for the text story "The Atomic Monster" in the Marvel black-and-white horror magazine Monsters Unleashed #9 (Dec. 1974), Jones made his debut as penciller of an 18-page story starring the martial artist superhero Iron Fist in Marvel Premiere #20 (January 1975). He also pencilled the next two Iron Fist stories and co-created the supporting character Misty Knight with writer Tony Isabella. Jones also worked on Iron Man starting with issue #73 (March 1975).

When he moved to DC Comics, Jones worked with writer Gerry Conway on Super-Team Family, which teamed the Atom with various other DC characters. After that title's cancellation, a Supergirl/Doom Patrol team-up drawn by Jones, originally scheduled to appear in Super-Team Family was published in The Superman Family #191–193.

Jones worked on the DC series All-Star Squadron in the mid-1980s, penciling the majority of the issues between 1985 and 1987. He left the comics field for several years to work in television, and focused on graphic design work. Jones returned to comics in 1994 to pencil Marvel Comics' Captain America Annual #13, and issues of DC/Milestone Media's Kobalt, Hardware, and Blood Syndicate. His last published comic was Marvel's Daredevil #343 (Aug. 1995), on which he and Keith Pollard did breakdowns, with finished pencils by Tom Palmer.

== Bibliography ==
=== DC Comics ===
- All-Star Squadron #37, 41–46, 50–55, 57–60, 67 (1984–1987)
- DC Special #28 (Legion of Super-Heroes) (1977)
- DC Special Series #6 (Secret Society of Super Villains) (1977)
- Men of War #2–3 (Codename: Gravedigger) (1977)
- Secret Origins vol. 2 #19 (Guardian) (1987)
- Superboy and the Legion of Super-Heroes #241–242 (1978)
- The Superman Family #191–193 (Supergirl and the Doom Patrol) (1978–1979)
- Super-Team Family #12–15 (1977–1978)
- Who's Who: The Definitive Directory of the DC Universe #16 (1986)

==== Milestone Media ====
- Blood Syndicate #4 (1993)
- Hardware #9 (1993)
- Kobalt #1–6 (1994)

=== Marvel Comics ===
- Astonishing Tales #30 (Deathlok) (1975)
- The Avengers #192 (1980)
- Captain America Annual #13 (1994)
- Daredevil #343 (1995)
- G.I. Joe: A Real American Hero #62 (1987)
- Iron Man #73–75, 77 (1975)
- Marvel Premiere #20–22 (Iron Fist) (1975)
- Marvel Spotlight #33 (Deathlok) (1977)
- Marvel Two-in-One #15 (The Thing and Morbius, the Living Vampire) (1976)
- Monsters Unleashed #9 (1974)
- Nightmask #5 (1987)
- Official Handbook of the Marvel Universe Deluxe Edition #12 (1986)
- Power Man #30 (1976)
- Star Brand #8 (1987)
- Super-Villain Team-Up #17 (1980)
- Thor #228, 290 (1974–1979)
- What If...? #37 (The Thing) (1983)

== Audio/video ==
- "Kids Read Comics Interview - Arvell Jones Bonus Story", TGTWebcomics, YouTube, June 23, 2010
- "Arvell Jones Interview!", The Comic Book Syndicate, YouTube, April 30, 2011

Preceded by Larry Hama	"Iron Fist" feature in Marvel Premiere artist 1975	Succeeded by Pat Broderick
Preceded by George Tuska	Iron Man artist 1975	Succeeded by George Tuska
Preceded by Richard Howell	All-Star Squadron artist 1985–1986	Succeeded by Mike Harris
