= Topps Comics =

Defunct American comic book publisher

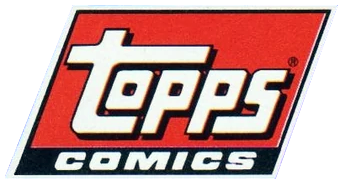
- Industry: Publishing
- Genre: Science fiction, horror, adventure
- Founded: March 1992; 34 years ago
- Defunct: 1998; 28 years ago
- Headquarters: Brooklyn/Manhattan, New York City, U.S.
- Key people: Jim Salicrup (EIC)
- Products: Comic books
- Parent: Topps Company, Inc.

Topps Comics was a division of Topps that published comic books from 1993 to 1998, beginning its existence during a short-lived comics industry boom that attracted many investors and created many companies. It was based in New York City, first at 254 36th Street, Brooklyn, and then at One Whitehall Street, in Manhattan.

The company specialized in licensed titles, particularly film and TV series tie-ins, such as The X-Files, based on the Fox TV series, and the films Bram Stoker's Dracula and Jurassic Park. It also licensed such literary properties as Zorro, and published a smattering of original series, including Cadillacs and Dinosaurs and several based on concepts by the then-retired comics industry legend Jack Kirby.

== History ==
In March 1992, Topps announced the formation of Topps Comics, to be headed by Jim Salicrup, with plans to start publishing in October 1992. The company's first title was Bram Stoker's Dracula, a four-issue miniseries (Oct. 1992—Jan. 1993), along with 100 collectible cards, based on the film, with art provided by Mike Mignola and a full script provided by Roy Thomas, using dialogue derived almost entirely from the film's script.

In April 1993 Topps launched a superhero line titled "The Kirbyverse", based on Jack Kirby drawings and concepts, that contained three one-shots and six miniseries, of which two of the latter each lasted only one issue and were never completed (they remain so to this day).

Topps entered the comic book market as the number of publishers was increasing, with at least nine other companies joining the field from 1990 to 1992. This coincided with an increase in comic book market speculation that created inflated sales and an eventual collapse of the market. Topps Comics closed down in 1998.

== Personnel ==
Topps Comics' editor-in-chief and associate publisher was Jim Salicrup. Editors included Len Brown (the co-creator of Topps' 1962 Mars Attacks cards), Howard Zimmerman, and Dwight Jon Zimmerman. The company's sales and promotions manager Charles S. Novinskie is listed as, additionally, a Topps Comics editor in his capsule biography at Non-Sport Update magazine. The company's design director, Brian Boerner, is listed as reprint editor (along with Charles S. Novinskie) in the Xena trade paperbacks' credits.

Veteran comic book scripter Tony Isabella, writing about difficulties with The X-Files creator Chris Carter over the Topps Comics' series, said in a 2000 interview:

[W]hoever was approving the comics over in Chris Carter Land were the poster kids for anal retentiveness. Although it's possible that they were so picky because they never wanted the comics out there in the first place. The main reason the comics fell behind schedule was because it took so long to satisfy the X-Files people. They went over everything with a fine-tooth comb, including the letters columns. . . . I rarely ran negative letters in these columns because the [Topps] editors were afraid that the X-Files people would want even more changes in the material. Almost from the start, there were never enough usable letters for our needs. That's why I started including the 'Deep Postage' news items — and making up letters completely. I also wrote the Xena letters columns, but those were a lot easier to produce.

== The Kirbyverse ==
Bombast #1 (April 1993), cover art by Jack Kirby

The "Kirbyverse" comics, launched simultaneously with April 1993 cover dates, stemmed from character designs and story concepts that the prolific Kirby, at this very late point in his life, had in his files of unrealized projects and preliminary sketches (some for Pacific Comics, which closed down in 1985). Topps licensed them for an eight-title interrelated mythos based around what became Jack Kirby's Secret City Saga. That flagship title was written by former Marvel Comics editor-in-chief Roy Thomas, with an issue #0 prequel drawn by artist Walt Simonson and the remainder of the series by Spider-Man co-creator Steve Ditko.

Kirby himself wrote and drew eight pages of the Satan's Six premiere, interlaced with story pages by writer Tony Isabella, penciler John Cleary and inker Armando Gil. Kirby's contribution may have been drawn in the 1970s, as one historian wrote: "The 1970s was the flowering of Jack's interest in the paranormal. Freed from the restraints of more conservative collaborators, Jack delved into these themes with gusto. ... [He] developed 'Satan's Six' around this time, although it didn't see the light of day until the Topps Kirbyverse campaign in the 1990s". As well, the covers of the Bombast, Captain Glory, and NightGlider one-shots noted below were built around pre-existing Kirby character designs.

Along with Secret City Saga and Satan's Six, the Kirbyverse titles were:

- Bombast, by plotter Thomas, scripter Gary Friedrich and artists Dick Ayers and John Severin
- Captain Glory, by writer Thomas and artist Ditko
- Jack Kirby's TeenAgents, by writer Kurt Busiek, penciler Neil Vokes, and inkers John Beatty and Jordi Ensign
- Jack Kirby's Silver Star, by writer Busiek, penciler James W. Fry III, and inker Terry Austin
- NightGlider, by plotter Thomas, scripter Gerry Conway, and artist Don Heck
- Victory, by writer Busiek, penciler Keith Giffen, and inker Jimmy Palmiotti

Kurt Busiek, in an undated interview, gave some background on the comics line:

Silver Star is a Jack Kirby character, originally done as a miniseries for Pacific [Comics]. Back when I was writing for the Topps Kirbyverse, I started two miniseries that were never completed, Victory and Silver Star, both of which got one issue published before the line collapsed. Victory was a crossover, bringing together all the established Kirbyverse characters and reintroducing Captain Victory [of the 1981–1984 Pacific Comics series Captain Victory and the Galactic Rangers]... but Silver Star was a standalone project, one that was completely plotted and mostly scripted.

In 2000, the Kirby estate said Dark Horse Entertainment had optioned Satan's Six as a film property.

In 2011, Dynamite Entertainment published a comic book series titled Kirby: Genesis that represented a reboot of the Kirbyverse.

== List of Topps Comics publications ==
Most, but not all, of these stories were released either as miniseries or as one-shots.

=== Original series ===
- The Barbi Twins Adventures #1 (July 1995, one-shot)
- Cadillacs and Dinosaurs #1—9 (February—November 1994)
- Lady Rawhide #1—5 (July 1995—March 1996, miniseries and an original spin-off of Zorro)
- Lady Rawhide (vol. 2) #1—5 (miniseries; October 1996—June 1997, a one-shot preview ashcan comic that was a canonical part of this miniseries was inserted into Wizard magazine)

==== Kirbyverse comics ====
- Bombast #1 (April 1993, one-shot)
- Captain Glory #1 (April 1993, one-shot)
- Jack Kirby's Secret City Saga #0—4 (April—August 1993)
- Jack Kirby's Silver Star #1 (October 1993, planned four-issue miniseries, truncated)
- Jack Kirby's TeenAgents #1—4 (August—November 1993)
- NightGlider #1 (April 1993, one-shot)
- Satan's Six #1—4 (April—July 1993)
- Satan's Six: Hellspawn #1—3 (June—July 1994)
- Victory #1 (June 1994; planned five-issue miniseries, truncated)

=== Literary adaptations/tie-ins ===
- Bill, the Galactic Hero #1—3 (July—November 1994)
- The Dracula Chronicles #1—3 (April—June 1995, a reprint of an earlier Topps Comics miniseries titled Dracula: Vlad the Impaler #1—3 (February—April 1993))
- Dracula Versus Zorro #1—2 (October—November 1993)
- Dracula: Vlad the Impaler #1—3 (February—April 1993)
- Elric: One Life #0 (August 1996, one-shot)
- Elric: Stormbringer #1—7 (1997, co-published with Dark Horse Comics)
- The Frankenstein/Dracula War #1—3 (February—April 1995)
- Ray Bradbury Comics #1—5 (February—October 1993, bi-monthly)
- A Ray Bradbury Comics Special — Ray Bradbury's The Illustrated Man #1 (1993, one-shot)
- A Ray Bradbury Comics Special — Ray Bradbury's Tales of Terror #1 (May 1994, one-shot)
- A Ray Bradbury Comics Special — Ray Bradbury's Martian Chronicles #1 (June 1994, one-shot)
- Zorro #0–11 (November 1993—November 1994)

=== Film adaptations/tie-ins ===
- Bram Stoker's Dracula #1—4 (October 1992—January 1993)
- Dragonheart #1—2 (May—June 1996)
- Jackie Chan's Spartan X: The Armour of Heaven #1—3 (May—August 1997)
- James Bond 007: GoldenEye #00—1 (January 1996, planned three-issue miniseries, truncated (issue #00 was labeled on its front cover as a Special James Bond Convention Limited Preview Edition))
- Jason Goes to Hell: The Final Friday #1—3 (July—September 1993)
- Jason vs. Leatherface #1—3 (October 1995—January 1996)
- Jurassic Park #1—4 (June—August 1993) and 0 (November 1993)
- Jurassic Park: Raptor #1—2 (November—December 1993)
- Jurassic Park: Raptors Attack #1—4 (March—June 1994)
- Jurassic Park: Raptors Hijack #1—4 (July—October 1994)
- Jurassic Park Adventures #1—10 (June 1994—February 1995)
- Jurassic Park Annual #1 (May 1995, one-shot)
- The Lost World: Jurassic Park #1—4 (May—August 1997)
- Mary Shelley's Frankenstein #1—4 (October 1994—January 1995)
- Return to Jurassic Park #1—9 (April 1995—February 1996)
- Star Wars: Tales of the Jedi: Dark Lords of the Sith — Special Ashcan Edition (September 1994, one-shot that was co-published with Dark Horse Comics)

=== TV series/radio series adaptations/tie-ins ===
- Duckman #1—5 (November 1994—May 1995) and 0 (February 1996)
- Duckman: The Mob Frog Saga #1—3 (November 1994—February 1995)
- Exosquad #0—1 (January 1994)
- Hercules: The Legendary Journeys #1—5 (June—October 1996)
- The Lone Ranger and Tonto #1—4 (August—November 1994)
- The Marriage of Hercules and Xena #1 (July 1998, one-shot)
- Space: Above and Beyond #1—3 (January—March 1996)
- Space: Above and Beyond — The Gauntlet #1—2 (May—June 1996)
- The X-Files #1—41 (January 1995—September 1998), 1/2 (1996, advertised in Wizard magazine #53 (January 1996) which was polybagged with a certificate and a corresponding envelope that could be redeemed for a free copy of the comic; it was then shipped bagged and boarded with a Wizard Certificate of Authenticity) and 0 (1996, an adaptation of the series' pilot episode)
- The X-Files Hero Illustrated Special #1 (March 1995, one-shot, polybagged with the Direct Market edition of Hero Illustrated #22 (April 1995))
- The X-Files Special Edition #1—5 (June 1995, December 1995, March 1996, November 1996 and September 1997; reprints The X-Files #1—13 and The X-Files Annual #1, plus stories from Ray Bradbury Comics #2 and 5)
- The X-Files Collection (July 1995) and The X-Files Collection Vol. 2 (February 1997, trade paperbacks that reprint The X-Files #1—12, The X-Files Hero Illustrated Special #1 and The X-Files Annual #1)
- The X-Files Annual #1—2 (August 1995 and 1996)
- The X-Files Comics Digest #1—3 (December 1995, April 1996 and December 1996)
- The X-Files: Negative #-1 — -2 (September 1996)
- The X-Files: Season One (July 1997—July 1998) (one-shots; all of them adaptations of episodes of the first season of the TV series ("Pilot Episode" (July 1997), "Deep Throat" (August 1997), "Squeeze" (October 1997), "Conduit" (December 1997) "Ice" (February 1998), "Space" (March 1998), "Fire" (April 1998), "Beyond the Sea" (June 1998) and "Shadows" (July 1998)), two more episodes "The Jersey Devil" and "Ghost in the Machine", were planned but never published before Topps Comics closed down in 1998)
- The X-Files: Afterflight (August 1997, one-shot graphic novel)
- The X-Files: Ground Zero #1—4 (December 1997—March 1998, an adaptation of the spin-off novel by Kevin J. Anderson)
- The X-Files: Fight the Future #1 (July 1998, one-shot that was an adaptation of the spin-off feature film)
- Xena: Warrior Princess: Year One #1 (August 1997, one-shot)
- Xena: Warrior Princess #1—2 (August—September 1997) and 0 (October 1997)
- Xena: Warrior Princess/Joxer: Warrior Prince #1—3 (November 1997—January 1998)
- Xena: Warrior Princess: The Dragon's Teeth #1—3 (December 1997—February 1998)
- Xena: Warrior Princess vs. Callisto #1—3 (February—March 1998)
- Xena: Warrior Princess: The Orpheus Trilogy #1—3 (March—May 1998)
- Xena: Warrior Princess: Bloodlines #1—2 (May—June 1998)
- Xena: Warrior Princess and the Original Olympics #1—3 (June—August 1998)
- Xena: Warrior Princess: The Wrath of Hera #1—2 (September—October 1998)

=== Trading card series adaptations/tie-ins ===
- Mars Attacks #1—5 (May—October 1994, miniseries)
- Mars Attacks (vol. 2) #1—7 (August 1995—May 1996, ongoing series)
- Mars Attacks #1/2 (1995, one-shot that was co-published with Wizard magazine)
- Mars Attacks #11 / Wizard Ace Edition #65 (1996, one-shot that was co-published with Wizard magazine)
- Mars Attacks Baseball Special #1 (June 1996, one-shot)
- Mars Attacks High School #1—2 (May and September 1997, miniseries)
- Mars Attacks Image #1—4 (December 1996—April 1997, miniseries that was both published through Image Comics and was an intercompany crossover with them)
- Mars Attacks The Savage Dragon #1—4 (December 1996—March 1997, miniseries that was an intercompany crossover with Image Comics)

=== Other ===
- Topps Comics Presents #0 (June 1993)
- Topps Comics Preview #1 (spring 1994)
