= Necropolis (Judge Dredd story) =

- Publisher: Fleetway Publications
- Publication date: 14 April – 6 October 1990
- Genre: Science fiction
- Title(s): 2000 AD progs 674–699
- Main character(s): Judge Dredd, Judge Death, Judge Kraken

Creative team
- Writer: John Wagner
- Artist: Carlos Ezquerra
- Editor: Tharg (Richard Burton)
- Necropolis: ISBN 0-600-59640-0
- Necropolis Book One: ISBN 1-84023-601-9
- Necropolis Book Two: ISBN 1-84023-635-3
- Judge Dredd: The Complete Casefiles 14: ISBN 978-1-906735-29-6

"Necropolis" is a 26-part story featuring British comics science fiction character Judge Dredd. Written by John Wagner and painted by Carlos Ezquerra, it was published in 1990 in 2000 AD progs 674–699. The story was the subject of extensive foreshadowing in the comic, beginning with The Dead Man (progs 650–662), followed by "Tale of the Dead Man" (progs 662–668), and finally three stories collectively known as "Countdown to Necropolis" (progs 669–673). It pulled together various story threads going back four years. "Necropolis" was also followed by a number of epilogues and other follow-up stories, and had repercussions within the Judge Dredd strip which lasted for years.

Judge Dredd himself does not appear in 13 of the 26 episodes of "Necropolis", or in any of the 5 episodes of "Countdown to Necropolis".

== Plot ==
Set in the year 2112, the story concerns the tragedy that befalls Mega-City One following the resignation of Judge Dredd in "Tale of the Dead Man". The Justice Department considered Dredd a symbol of justice, and that knowledge of his resignation could adversely affect public order. To that end, Kraken, a clone-brother of Judge Dredd rescued from the fanatical Judda sect, was ordered to assume Judge Dredd's identity. He soon fell under the psychic influence of the Sisters of Death, and kidnapped Psi-Judge Kit Agee, whose psychic powers were used to form a bridge between Deadworld and Mega-City One. Realising something was up, Chief Judge Silver ordered a full-scale assault on Dunc Renaldo Block, the last known location of Judge Agee. The Sisters retaliated, their illusions making short work of the Judges. Top psi-judge Anderson realised that Kraken was under the Sisters' control, but was knocked out before she could raise the alarm. She disappeared beneath a tank, only to fall through a crumbling roadway into the Undercity, the remains of old New York. In the midst of this chaos, the Sisters sent Kraken to Tech 21, the dimensional research laboratory, and forced him to use their technology to free the Dark Judges from another dimension.

Kraken as a Dark Judge (painted by Carlos Ezquerra).

Chief Judge Silver (painted by Carlos Ezquerra).

With their Sisters' psychic power, the Dark Judges seized control of the city's Judges. Chief Judge Silver attempted suicide, but was captured, killed and then reanimated as their pet zombie and torture victim. The Sisters of Death shrouded the city in impenetrable shadow and blotted out all sun- and starlight, plunging the city into darkness; transforming Mega-City One into Necropolis. All life was outlawed, and the Dark Judges sentenced the entire population to death. Under their rule at least ten thousand citizens were rounded up and killed by the Dark Judges each day, with Kraken forced to take part in the slaughter; many others committed suicide, were shot by judges for breaking curfew, or fell to disease and starvation.

This reign of misrule continued for months, with few managing to escape. Judge Dredd and former Chief Judge McGruder, returning from exile to fight back, encountered a column of refugees that had fled into the Cursed Earth, while four Cadet Judges (Giant, Ekerson, Santando and Monk) had evaded pursuit from Judge Mortis and escaped into the Undercity, where they encountered the injured Psi-Judge Anderson. They soon met and joined forces with Dredd and McGruder and formed a plan of action. Following Judge Anderson's advice, Dredd decided to kill Kit Agee and thus break the Sisters' link with Earth. The Judges returned to the surface, hijacked an H-Wagon and used its weapons to destroy Dunc Renaldo block, where Kit Agee was imprisoned. With Agee dead, the psychic bridge was destroyed and the Sisters of Death were banished to Deadworld. The Judges regained control of themselves, and quickly regrouped under McGruder's command, redoubling their efforts to put a stop to the slaughter.

The Judges managed to recapture three of the Dark Judges: Fear was imprisoned in the miracle plastic Boing; Judge Fire was drawn out of his body by a powerful vacuum; while Anderson uses her psi-powers to trap Judge Mortis. Judge Death, when confronted, leapt from a city block window down to City Bottom, where he vanished, masking his presence with his own psychic talents. In this fashion he was able to escape and hide himself among the dead, and was soon buried with them in one of the many mass graves excavated to contain the sixty million citizens who died during this period. Kraken, free of Death's influence at last and overcome with guilt, welcomed his execution at Dredd's hands.

== Significance ==
Besides its epic length and the cataclysmic events depicted in the story, "Necropolis" was a major turning point in the long-running Democracy story arc that had begun four years earlier, and which now continued in a new direction. The story reintroduced the character Judge McGruder, absent from the strip for four years, now with obvious mental health problems as a result of her prolonged exile in the radioactive Cursed Earth desert. McGruder's mental illness became an important aspect of the "Mechanismo" story four years later.

The story also reintroduced Judge Death and his fellow Dark Judges as a serious presence in the series, having not appeared since being exiled to another dimension in the first "Anderson Psi Division" story several years earlier. The story also introduced the "Sisters of Death", and saw the deaths of Judge Kraken, Judge Odell, and Chief Judge Silver.

Stories would be spun out of Necropolis for over a year after it ended: "Nightmares", "Fixing Daddy", and "The Apartment" showed the devastation, diseases, and trauma that had been caused; "Death Aid", Garth Ennis's first Judge Dredd story, had the villains motivated by raising money for Necropolis orphans; "Return of the King" featured an undead Silver trying to retake his position and being executed by Dredd for dereliction of duty; "Wot I Did During Necropolis" had PJ Maybe escaping from the psycho-cubes thanks to the crisis; and "Judge Death – Boyhood of a Superfiend" had Death morose at the failure of his grand work. The death toll was used to raise the stakes in "Judgement Day" – all sixty million victims became zombies – and both of those mega-epics were used to start off the Mechanismo storyline, due to the damage done to the judge force. Years later, Necropolis would still be mentioned or used in Dredd stories.

This story arc would also lead to a new phase in Dredd's doubts about the Justice System and in the ongoing democracy storyline. In "Nightmares", Dredd was back to believing in the system because of the devastation of Necropolis: only the judges, he felt, could keep the city together after such an attack. However, the lack of clear public approval for the system left him troubled. Meanwhile, the public failure of the judges meant that pro-democracy sentiment was on the rise. Dredd proposed a referendum: the people would either vote for a return to democracy or vote to retain the judges, with Dredd believing they would vote for the status quo. (Dredd also felt that he should have tried to work within the system to change it: when Dredd's doubts resurfaced in a major way after "Origins", this was the tactic he used.)

== Related stories ==
- "Bloodline" (written by John Wagner, with art by Will Simpson, in 2000 AD #583-584, 1988)
  - Introduces Kraken.
- "The Shooting Match" (written by John Wagner, with art by John Higgins, in 2000 AD #650, 1989)
- "A Letter to Judge Dredd" (written by John Wagner, with art by Will Simpson, in 2000 AD #661, 1990)
  - Prologue to "Tale of the Dead Man".
- "Tale of the Dead Man" (written by John Wagner, with art by Will Simpson and Jeff Anderson, in 2000 AD #662-668, 1990)
  - Dredd resigns.
  - See also The Dead Man (Judge Dredd spin-off in #650-662)
- "By Lethal Injection" (written by John Wagner, with art by Carlos Ezquerra, in 2000 AD #669-670, 1990)
- "Rights of Succession" (written by John Wagner, with art by Carlos Ezquerra, in 2000 AD #671, 1990)
  - Kraken assumes Dredd's identity.
- "Dear Annie" (written by John Wagner, with art by Carlos Ezquerra, in 2000 AD #672-673, 1990)
- "Necropolis" (written by John Wagner, with art by Carlos Ezquerra, in 2000 AD #674-699, 1990)
- "The Theatre of Death" (written by John Wagner, with art by Ron Smith, in 2000 AD #700-701, 1990)
- "Return of the King" (written by Garth Ennis, with art by Carlos Ezquerra, in 2000 AD #733-735, 1991)
  - Contains flashbacks to unseen events during "Necropolis" and reveals Silver's ultimate fate.

== Trade paperbacks ==
Necropolis has been reprinted several times; first in the Judge Dredd Megazine, volume 3 issues 21 to 35, and then in trade paperbacks:

- Judge Dredd: Necropolis (collects "Dear Annie" and "Necropolis", Hamlyn, 192 pages, 1998, ISBN 0-600-59640-0)
- Judge Dredd: Necropolis Book One (collects "Tale of the Dead Man", "By Lethal Injection", "Rights of Succession", "Dear Annie", and beginning of "Necropolis", Titan, 144 pages, 2003, ISBN 1-84023-601-9)
- Judge Dredd: Necropolis Book Two (collects rest of "Necropolis", Titan, 136 pages, 2003, ISBN 1-84023-635-3)
- Judge Dredd: The Complete Case Files 14 (collects "Tale of the Dead Man", "By Lethal Injection", "Rights of Succession", "Dear Annie", and all of "Necropolis", Rebellion, 272 pages, 2009, ISBN 978-1-906735-29-6)
- Judge Dredd: The Mega Collection #31 (2016) collects "By Lethal Injection", "Rights of Succession", "Dear Annie" and "Necropolis"

== See also ==
- "City of the Damned", an earlier Judge Dredd story which contained a lot of the elements that would later appear in Necropolis.
- "Oz", the story which introduced the Judda.

Preceded by The Dead Man	Major Judge Dredd stories 1990	Succeeded by America
