= List of Judge Dredd characters =

This is a list of characters in the British comic strip Judge Dredd appearing in 2000 AD, Judge Dredd Megazine and related publications. They are listed alphabetically by surname, in categories. (Major characters have their own articles: see the navigation box at the bottom of this article.)

== Judges of Mega-City One ==
=== Anderson ===
See Judge Anderson.

=== Beeny ===
First appearance: Judge Dredd Megazine vol. 3 issue 20 (1996). Created by John Wagner and Colin MacNeil.

America Beeny is the child of America Jara and Bennett Beeny, two main characters who appeared in the first America story. America Beeny appeared briefly in the second story, but her first main story was the third in the America trilogy, in which she took a lead role.

In 2119 Beeny was enrolled as a cadet in the Academy of Law by her father just before his untimely death, and served well enough to qualify for the accelerated graduation program. In her tenth year, as with all tenth year cadets, she was required to plan and execute a criminal investigation on her own. Allowed to choose her supervisor, she chose to work with Judge Dredd.

In 2130 she graduated to full judge at age 15. In late 2137 Beeny and Dredd investigated a Total War terrorist cell which had assassinated a member of the Council of Five, Mega-City One's highest legislative body. Following the arrest of the perpetrators, Dredd recommended that Beeny be appointed to the vacant Council seat, and Chief Judge Hershey agreed. She was briefly removed from the Council in early 2141, when the entire Council was dismissed by the new chief judge, Judge Logan. However, shortly afterwards Logan acknowledged that this had been a mistake, and he reinstated her.

=== Castillo ===
First appearance: 2000 AD #891 (1994). Created by John Wagner and Mark Harrison.

Judge Laverne Castillo was a street judge who was taken off street duty when she froze in combat and allowed a fellow judge to be shot and seriously wounded. Transferred to administrative duties, she became the personal aide to Chief Judge McGruder and accompanied the Chief Judge on a diplomatic visit to the planet Hestia. When their spaceship crashed there, Castillo so impressed Judge Dredd that on their return home he recommended that she be transferred back to street duty. This time she excelled in her chosen role, and was Dredd's sidekick in a number of stories until she was murdered in 2123 by aliens after eight years on the force.

During her time on Hestia, Castillo developed a secret and unrequited crush on Judge Dredd. Writer John Wagner never developed this theme any further with her character, but this idea was taken up again with the character Galen DeMarco and used to greater effect, with significant repercussions in the relevant stories.

=== Deacon ===
First appearance: 2000 AD #2082 (2018). Created by Michael Carroll and Jake Lynch.

Judge Francesco Deacon was one of the first street judges in the 2030s. Before becoming a judge he was in the military police. He first appeared in Michael Carroll's novel Judges: The Avalanche, and simultaneously in the Judge Dredd comic strip story "Paradigm Shift" in 2000 AD #2082–2086 in May 2018, also written by Carroll and with art by Jake Lynch. He has since appeared in a minor role in the series "Dreadnoughts" in the Judge Dredd Megazine.

=== Dekker ===
First appearance: 2000 AD #370 (1984). Created by John Wagner, Alan Grant (writers) and Kim Raymond (artist).

Judge Dekker first appeared in 1984 as a rookie judge, being successfully evaluated by Dredd as to her suitability to become a full judge. She did not reappear in the strip again until 1991, when writer Garth Ennis used her as a recurring secondary character in several 1991 and 1992 strips – most prominently as the investigating judge against the "Muzak Killer". By this time an experienced street judge, she was killed in the 1992 story "Judgement Day" (set in 2114). Upon her death Dredd considered that she was "...the best rookie he'd ever had, bar none." He later hallucinated her during his crucifixion in "Goodnight Kiss".

An alternative, evil version of Dekker from a parallel universe appeared in the 1994 novel Dread Dominion.

=== Dolman ===
First appearance: 2000 AD #1378 (2004). Created by John Wagner and Carlos Ezquerra.

Dolman was a cadet at the Academy of Law. He was cloned from Judge Dredd's DNA. Although he performed well at the Academy, he resented his lack of control over his own life and chose to leave the Academy and Mega-City One. He joined the Space Corps and was transferred to an offworld Academy, though he regularly returned to the city; keeping in touch with Vienna Dredd and took classes at night school.

Shortly after "Day of Chaos", Dolman returned to the city: he felt obliged to help out, especially with his family in danger. He was an advisor and non-combatant in the Corps by now, and first arrived in the city when Marines were asked to break the siege at Sue Perkins Block. Colonel Lynn Easter viewed him with mild contempt, especially when he tried to stop her bombing the block, but Dolman used his judge training to cripple a marine, forcing her to call off the airstrike, and then assist Dredd in stopping the siege. (For most of the story Dolman went unnamed, leaving his return a surprise.) He was injured in the process and sent to hospital, with Dredd calling him "a judge" over Dolman's protests. The Corps were left angry that Dolman had shot a marine – a decision Dredd agreed with – and Easter and two others assaulted him in hospital, but Dolman was able to take them down.

=== Joe Dredd ===
See Judge Dredd.

=== Eustace Fargo ===
First appearance: 2000 AD #559 (1988) but had been mentioned earlier. Created by John Wagner, Alan Grant (writers) and Brendan McCarthy.

Chief Judge Eustace Fargo was the first chief judge of Mega-City One (and indeed of the entire United States, before it was divided) and the source of the DNA from which Judge Dredd was cloned. In the 1995 film Judge Dredd Fargo was played by Max von Sydow.

Almost every appearance of Fargo in the comic has been a flashback, since he was believed to have died in 2051, decades before the stories in the comic. However, in 2006–07 the story Origins, written by John Wagner, described a secret history in which Fargo's death had been faked and he had survived in suspended animation until 2129.

As a result of a massive increase in violent gang crime, US president Thomas Gurney appointed Fargo Special Prosecutor for Street Crime. When the Constitution was amended to allow the creation of an elite law enforcement agency to convict criminals without due process, Fargo was made the first "chief judge" in 2031. Fargo resigned and attempted suicide in 2051, but the matter was covered up by deputy chief judges Solomon and Goodman, who fabricated a story that he had been killed in a drive-by shooting. In fact he survived, and was placed in suspended animation until such time as medical science advanced to the point where his injuries could be fully healed. He was succeeded as chief judge by Solomon.

In 2070, after the Third World War devastated the United States, Fargo was revived, and he advised the chief judge – now Goodman – to overthrow President Bob Booth and take over the government, which was done. Fargo survived an assassination attempt by Morton Judd, but his condition deteriorated and he was returned to suspended animation. Shortly afterwards he was kidnapped by Judd's men, and was thought lost forever. But in 2129 it was discovered that he was being held by terrorists in the Cursed Earth, and Judge Dredd led a team to rescue him. Fargo was revived, but he was beyond saving and died shortly afterwards.

=== Francisco ===
First appearance: 2000 AD #1520 (2007). Created by John Wagner and Rufus Dayglo.

Judge Dan Francisco was chief judge of Mega-City One from 2131 to 2134, except for a brief period when he was deposed by his deputy, Judge Sinfield, from 2131 to 2132.

Before becoming chief judge, Francisco was a street judge and the subject of a 24-hour reality show called The Streets Of Dan Francisco – a major public relations boost for Justice Department. In 2131 Judges Sinfield, Cardew and Millan began a campaign to run Francisco as a candidate to replace Judge Hershey as chief judge, running on an anti-mutant platform. He won by a landslide.

Mutant townships in the Cursed Earth were set up, to which to expel the mutant citizens. Francisco also had Hershey and Dredd given new postings, off-world and in the townships respectively, until the mutant issue died down; how much of this was his own idea and how much was Sinfield's remained ambiguous.

Sinfield dosed Francisco with a powerful hypnotic drug, persuaded him to resign, and succeeded him as acting chief judge. Both Dredd and the mayor were left confused and suspicious by Francisco's sudden collapse in confidence and by his support of Sinfield. This eventually led to an investigation, and Sinfield's crime was uncovered. Sinfield was arrested, and Francisco returned to office. Francisco appointed Dredd to the Council of Five.

In 2134 Dredd learned of a terrorist plot to infect Mega-City One with a deadly pathogen. Dredd recommended a ground assault on the terrorist's camp, but Francisco overruled him and ordered an air strike. Consequently, the fact that it was not the real camp was not discovered until it was too late, and Mega-City One was infected. By the time the disease was contained, 350 million people had been killed (out of an initial population of around 400 million), and Francisco resigned in shame of "presiding over the worst disaster in our history". He appointed Judge Hershey as his successor.

=== "Dirty Frank" ===
First appearance: 2000 AD #1389 (2004). Created by Rob Williams and Henry Flint.

Judge "Dirty Frank" is a judge who has been undercover for so long that he has lost his sanity. He refers to himself in the third person, has dubious personal hygiene and can urinate for twenty three minutes non-stop. During the investigation into Judge Smiley, Frank was wounded and later declared dead, but this was simply a ruse and he was once again sent undercover this time abroad to locate and infiltrate the remaining agents of Smiley. According to the introduction in the collected graphic novel, his physical appearance is based on Alan Moore, since his supposed death he has taken a more cleaner, trimmed and tidy appearance.

=== Gerhart ===
SJS Judge Alex Gerhart was Dredd's interrogator when a Tek-Division scientist was murdered. He used the opportunity to pressure Dredd about whether he felt guilty for Chaos Day, knowing it was revenge for his own destruction of East-Meg One. Gerhart himself did feel Dredd was responsible. When their paths next crossed, he was hospitalised saving Dredd from a missile attack: he intended to one day arrest the man and put him on trial for Chaos Day.

In 2136, Gerhart was sent with Dredd and a marine squad to investigate a potential uprising on the Titan penal colony.

In 2140 he resigned and took the Long Walk.

Gerhart was murdered by insane SJS Judge Pin in 2141 for being a close associate of Dredd.

=== Giant ===
Judge Giant can refer to either of two characters. They are father and son. Their first names have never been given.

They are both descended from another 2000 AD character, 'Giant' (real name John Clay), who starred in his own series in 2000 AD, Harlem Heroes, which ran in progs (issues) 1–27 of the comic. John 'Giant' Clay made a cameo appearance in the Judge Dredd strip in prog 28. Since Judge Dredd himself did not appear in 2000 AD until prog 2, the Giant family's appearance in the comic predates Dredd's debut in his own strip.

==== Judge Giant Sr ====
First appearance: 2000 AD #27 (1977). Created by John Wagner and Ian Gibson.

The original Judge Giant first appeared in prog 27 of the comic (1977) as a rookie judge who had just graduated from the Academy of Law. Set in 2099, his first appearance in the Judge Dredd story "The Academy of Law" (progs 27–28) was a crossover with Harlem Heroes, set decades after the events depicted in that series. It featured a cameo appearance by his father, John 'Giant' Clay, as a very old man at the end of the story. "The Academy of Law" is also notable for the debut of another important supporting character, Judge Griffin, as well as the Academy of Law itself. It tells of Rookie Giant's Final Assessment, a grueling test of his judgment and abilities under Judge Dredd's supervision. Dredd is satisfied and Giant becomes a full Street Judge.

Judge Giant became Dredd's recurring sidekick for the next four years. His most important story was the 23-episode Judge Cal storyline, in which he first saved Dredd from being executed and then fought with him against Cal's renegade judges and alien mercenaries (Kleggs) until the end. Although he had an important role in that story, his appearances in later tales were generally little more than mere cameos, and his importance within the strip tailed off somewhat. He was finally killed off in the "Block Mania" story (1981) while trying to arrest Orlok just before the Apocalypse War. The unheroic circumstances of his death (he was shot in the back in a brief scene) were controversial among fans, since although they were used to seeing popular characters killed off in 2000 AD, they were disappointed with the cursory way in which Giant's death was depicted. In an interview years later, writer Alan Grant said: "When we wrote the death of Giant, I thought it was a great idea to kill him off in such a casual, natural (for a judge) way. But when the reader outcry came, I was startled and forced to see things from their point of view."

==== Judge Giant Jr ====
First appearance: 2000 AD #651 (1989). Created by John Wagner and Carlos Ezquerra.

In 1989 the story "Young Giant" established that the original Judge Giant had fathered a child in 2101, something prohibited to judges. Orphaned when his mother was murdered in front of him shortly after the Apocalypse War in 2104, Giant's son had been inducted into the Academy of Law, where he performed extremely well but with a worrying streak of violence that threatened his ability as a judge. With Dredd's help, Cadet Giant was able to get past his deep-rooted anger and brought his mother's killer to justice.

Unlike his father, who became a full judge in his first story, Cadet Giant remained a cadet for five years during his recurring appearances in the strip. He was a major protagonist in one of Judge Dredd's biggest and most significant epics, "Necropolis", even taking over the lead role from Dredd himself in half a dozen episodes (including two in which Dredd did not even appear). He led a group of cadets who remained free of Dark Judge control and, at one point, were personally hunted down by Judge Mortis. He would later be one of the first people to battle Sabbat's zombies during Judgement Day. Eventually, he became the youngest cadet ever to graduate from the Academy, at the age of fifteen, having been fast-tracked. In a story reminiscent of his father's debut, Giant's Final Assessment was conducted by Judge Dredd, who passed him as fit to become a judge in 2116.

The new Judge Giant has made several appearances since, and actually saved the whole world from a deadly virus in 2117. He is apparently one of the best judges in Mega-City One, although he has not featured in any story to the extent that he did in "Necropolis".

(In a six-page one-off story in the Judge Dredd Megazine #216 called "Whatever Happened to John 'Giant' Clay?" (2004), Judge Giant met his grandfather for the first time. The original Giant had not appeared in any story since 1978, and this story ended with his death from old age.)

=== Goodman ===
First appearance: 2000 AD #2 (1977). Created by Peter Harris and Mike McMahon.

Chief Judge Clarence Goodman was Mega-City One's longest serving chief judge, and the first to appear in the comic. He was in the first ever episode of Judge Dredd in prog 2 (March 1977), although not named until prog 86. He was assassinated in prog 89, but returned in flashbacks in the story Origins (2006–2007).

Goodman was deputy chief judge of the United States, first under Chief Judge Fargo and then under Chief Judge Solomon. From 2052 each American mega-city ran its own justice department, and Goodman was deputy chief judge of Mega-City One, succeeding Solomon as chief judge in 2058. In 2070, after President Robert Booth started a nuclear war which devastated America, Goodman overthrew the president and Congress and took over the city; the other mega-cities became independent.

Thirty years later Goodman was assassinated by Judge Quincy and others, on the orders of his own deputy, Judge Cal.

=== Greel ===
First appearance: 2000 AD #892 (1994). Created by John Wagner and Mark Harrison.

Tek-Judge Todd Greel was head of Tek-Division, and he personally took over the Mechanismo robot judge project after the project's previous heads, Stitch and Quiggley, were disgraced. In 2116 Greel compelled Stich to give evidence against Dredd for having illegally destroyed a Mark II robot to sabotage their field test, which resulted in Dredd being convicted and sent to the penal colony on Titan. Immediately afterwards, Greel was briefly acting chief judge. However he was implicated in an assassination attempt on Chief Judge McGruder when one of his Mark IIA robots attempted to kill her and she had to be saved by Dredd while en route to Titan. Although Greel's alleged guilt was never proved, McGruder curtly demoted him to a junior position in Traffic Control, effectively finishing his political ambitions for ever. The Mechanismo programme was aborted, and Dredd was pardoned. Greel was succeeded as head of Tek-Division by Judge McGovern and then Judge McTighe. Greel later appeared in The Pit, running Traffic Station Alamo in the North-West Habzone: enforcing petty restrictions on other judges, his only remaining power.

=== Griffin ===
First appearance: 2000 AD #27 (1977). Created by John Wagner and Ian Gibson.

Judge Jürgen Griffin first appeared in prog 27 in a story by John Wagner and Ian Gibson. He was Principal of the Academy of Law, and had taught Dredd when he was a cadet. When the insane Chief Judge Cal seized control of Mega-City One, Griffin and other Academy tutors joined Dredd's resistance movement. Griffin was one of only two of these tutors who was still alive by the time Cal was overthrown; the other was Judge-Tutor Pepper. Dredd declined to succeed Cal as chief judge and nominated Griffin for the office. Griffin was elected chief judge by acclamation, and appointed Pepper as deputy chief judge.

Griffin proved to be capable chief judge, and he maintained a great respect for Dredd: when the Council of Five questioned Dredd's abandonment of the "Judge Child," Owen Krysler, Griffin reminded the council of how Dredd's actions on a prior occasion had saved Mega-City One from Judge Cal, and he ruled against an inquiry into Dredd's judgement. Unfortunately, Griffin was captured by the enemy during the Apocalypse War in 2104 and brainwashed into supporting their propaganda campaign. Dredd judged it impossible to rescue Griffin, and so he assassinated him instead, during a live television broadcast. In his final moments of life, Griffin regained his true personality in response to Dredd's accusation of treason. Griffin admitted he deserved to die, a sentence Dredd duly carried out.

Judges Quimby, McGruder, Griffin, Pepper and Ecks. Art by Brian Bolland (1980).

=== Guthrie ===
First appearance: 2000 AD #971 (1995). Created by John Wagner and Carlos Ezquerra.

Judge Guthrie was originally a street judge. In 2117, while he was working undercover in Sector 301, his controller, Judge McDade, set him up to be murdered, as she was in league with the criminals he was investigating. He escaped, and when McDade and two other bent judges tracked him down, he was forced to kill them all in self-defence. Not knowing whom to trust, he went into hiding, but was soon discovered and had to kill a fourth corrupt judge. Guthrie was arrested by Judge Dredd, who cleared his name and returned him to uniformed duties. Meanwhile, information provided by Guthrie had led to the arrests or deaths of a number of other corrupt judges, including the head and deputy head of Sector 301's SJS (internal affairs) unit. Altogether, two dozen judges were arrested during Dredd's investigation. Back on street duty, Guthrie participated in Dredd's clampdown on local organised crime in the sector, including a fierce gun battle with gangsters on Alamo Street. He was wounded in action during a riot immediately afterwards, but made a full recovery.

When Dredd was kidnapped by an eccentric millionaire who collected celebrities, Guthrie was one of the judges assigned to the case. He later fought in the Second Robot War in 2121.

Those stories were written by John Wagner; the character subsequently appeared in stories written by Gordon Rennie, in whose hands Guthrie was less fortunate. In 2127 Guthrie was severely wounded in an explosion, and was declared unfit for street duty. He had to be talked out of euthanisa by Judge Giant. Due to having lost all of his limbs, he was made into a cyborg, and was subsequently assigned to command a sea-barge which had been converted into a prison.

After that, the character made no further appearances until he was killed in a story written by Rob Williams, published in 2025 and set in 2147.

=== Herriman ===
First appearance: 2000 AD #891 (1994). Created by John Wagner and Mark Harrison.

Deputy Chief Judge Paul Herriman was originally a street judge and had worked in every major division of Justice Department. He saw himself as a conciliator, preferring to operate by consensus. In 2116, he was one of the senior judges who tried to pressure Judge McGruder into reinstating the Council of Five, in order to have the power to remove her.

After McGruder stood down, Herriman was one of the candidates in the election to replace her. Running against Judges Dredd, Volt and Hershey, Herriman came third. Chief Judge Volt appointed Herriman deputy chief judge. In 2117 Herriman became the first deputy chief judge to regularly preside over meetings of the ruling Council of Five following Volt's decision to abolish the chief judge's ex officio chairmanship of the Council.

In the graphic novel Batman vs. Judge Dredd: Die Laughing, Herriman was assassinated by Judge Mortis in 2120 while he was acting chief judge when a "Robo-Skeeter" mosquito drone infected by Mortis's spirit form stung him. Herriman's corpse was then used as Mortis's vessel. Mortis masqueraded as Herriman while his body slowly decayed, until Mortis finally took over and manifested in his true form.

Herriman was succeeded as deputy chief judge by Judge Hershey.

=== Hershey ===
First appearance: 2000 AD #162 (1980). Created by John Wagner and Brian Bolland.

Judge Barbara Hershey first appeared in The Judge Child in 1980, in an episode written by John Wagner and drawn by Brian Bolland. For nearly two decades she regularly appeared as Dredd's junior colleague, before being promoted to become his superior in 1999; she was chief judge twice. She also had her own solo series, Judge Hershey, in the Judge Dredd Megazine (1992–1997). In the 1995 film Judge Dredd, Hershey is played by Diane Lane.

Shortly after her graduation from the Academy of Law in 2102 at age eighteen, Judge Hershey joined the crew of the spaceship Justice 1 for the dangerous deep-space mission to find the Judge Child, who had been abducted by the Angel Gang. Two years later, during the Apocalypse War, Hershey was called upon again by Judge Dredd to join his "Apocalypse Squad" for a daring commando raid which ended the war.

When Chief Judge McGruder resigned her position in 2108, she appointed Hershey as the youngest ever member of the Council of Five, Mega-City One's highest legislative body. Her meteoric rise up the Justice Department's "greasy pole" saw her hotly tipped to become chief judge in due course, but she denied any real ambitions in this direction. Even so, she soon experienced the power that goes with the office when she was asked to serve as acting chief judge while McGruder – back for an unprecedented second term of office – attended a crisis meeting of judges from all over the world to find a way to defeat Sabbat the Necromagus in 2114. Her sister Hillary, a civilian, was killed by Sabbat's zombies, leaving her son Anton, Barbara's nephew, an orphan. The following year, when Anton was kidnapped, Hershey rescued him.

When McGruder resigned for the second time, in 2116, Hershey was one of the candidates to replace her, but she received only 13 votes from the 400 senior judges who voted. Chief Judge Volt appointed her to the new Council of Five, and in 2120 she became deputy chief judge. The following year she became acting chief judge following the suicide of Volt at the end of the Second Robot War. In 2122 she was elected chief judge in her own right, trouncing the only other candidate, Judge Loblaw.

In 2130 she repealed the anti-mutant laws (largely at Dredd's insistence), making her unpopular with the public and many judges. In the following year senior judges began a campaign to have her voted out of office and replaced with a hardline candidate who would reinstate those laws. Judge Dan Francisco won the election by a landslide, and appointed Hershey to a position on another planet. At over nine years, Hershey had the longest reign (2122–2131) of any chief judge since Clarence Goodman, and the longest since the comic strip began in 1977. Dredd described her as "the best chief judge we've ever had."

After two years away from Earth, Hershey returned to Mega-City One and resumed her old role as a street judge. In the story Day of Chaos, set in 2134, a deadly plague wiped out seven eighths of the city's population. Francisco resigned and appointed Hershey to form an interim government.

In 2139 Hershey reintroduced the Mechanismo robot judges, the failure of which had ended Chief Judge McGruder's career 23 years earlier. Her efforts to win Dredd over failed.

In 2141 Hershey decided to step down for a second time, and nominated Judge Logan as her successor. Publicly she retired due to desire to move on from the top post, but in private she had concealed a terminal illness contracted during her time off world and had managed to hide it from all but her doctors. Hershey was the third longest serving chief judge (after Fargo and Goodman), having held office for a total of sixteen years.

Several months later, with no signs of improvement, Hershey asked to be euthanized. This story, "Guatemala," was published in September 2019, 39 years after the character's first appearance. In later episodes of the same story, it was revealed that Hershey had had another sister (not named in the story), who lived in Guatemala. As this sister was unable to have children, Hershey had donated her eggs, and so the resulting child and grandchildren were genetically Judge Hershey's own. Years later, Guatemala was taken over in a coup and Hershey's sister was murdered. Hershey's last request to Dredd was for him to go there and rescue her surviving relatives from danger. Dredd later infiltrated Guatemala under the guise of a diplomatic mission, located the family and was able to rescue Hershey's daughter, granddaughter and unborn great-granddaughter; however her grandson was killed in the operation. The family were returned to Mega-City One to live under Justice Department protection.

Hershey's death was not as it seemed however and was in fact faked. Hershey believed she had been poisoned by her enemies and that a cure existed somewhere. She faked her death in order to retire and leave the city to hunt down the agents of former black ops chief Judge Smiley who she believed was responsible for her illness and held the cure. In her own series, written by Rob Williams and illustrated by Simon Fraser, she teamed up with undercover Judge 'Dirty' Frank and during their first investigation she was seriously wounded losing an arm and leg. But after receiving bionic replacements vowed to fight on. After completing her objectives she died in prog 2349 (September 2023).

=== Janus ===
First appearance: 2000 AD #842 (1993). Created by Grant Morrison and Carlos Ezquerra.

Judge Judy Janus is a member of Psi Division, Justice Department's unit of judges with psionic powers. She is portrayed as a young and ditzy psychic (she is a precog and telepath). The character was created by Grant Morrison, Mark Millar and Carlos Ezquerra and first appeared in prog 842 in the story Inferno (1993). She later appeared in her own eponymous strip, Janus: Psi Division (1993–1997), and in Dave Stone's 1995 novel Wetworks. Despite not starring in any stories for decades since, she was shown to still be an active judge in prog 2250 (2021), and is now part of Psi Division's senior leadership the Council of Psis; her ditzy carefree attitude has not changed.

=== Lamia ===
First appearance: 2000 AD #1640 (2009). Created by Ian Edginton and Dave Taylor.

Exorcist-Judge Miryam Lamia was killed in action and then returned from the dead in circumstances that have not been explained. This experience left her with the unwanted ability to see and speak with the ghosts of the dead, and bizarre patterned markings on her body. Although communicating with the dead initially helped her to solve cases, she became unable to cope with constantly seeing ghosts, as there were so many of them, and she became a recluse, spending most of her time secluded in a room which the dead could not enter. She first appeared in prog 1640.

=== Logan ===
First appearance: 2000 AD #1350 (2003). Created by John Wagner and Charlie Adlard.

Judge Logan is chief judge of Mega-City One (as of October 2025).

Logan first appeared as Dredd's assistant in the 2003 story "The Satanist", a role he held for nine years. During this period he appeared in the "Total War" storyline (2004) and in "Origins" (2006–2007). In "Origins" he was severely wounded in action and required major surgery, including an artificial lung, arm and spleen. In "Tour of Duty" (2009–10) he was promoted to senior judge. Shortly afterwards he personally discovered the evidence which resulted in Chief Judge Sinfield's conviction and removal from office in 2132.

In "Day of Chaos" (2011–2012) he again lost his arm in an encounter with Judge Mortis and was hospitalised. He received a prosthetic arm.

Logan was not seen again (except in a cameo) until "Machine Law" in 2019, in which it was revealed that he had become the sector house chief in Sector 6 in 2139. In that same story, set in 2141, he succeeded Judge Hershey as Chief Judge, with Dredd's endorsement. He immediately appointed a robot judge to the Council of Five, Mega-City One's ruling body, causing Dredd to have misgivings about him. However, he eventually realised he had tried to go too far too soon. Following a serious problem involving several robot judges in 2148, he considered resigning.

=== Maitland ===
First appearance: 2000 AD #1790 (2012). Created by Al Ewing and Nick Dyer.

Judge Maitland is a judge working for Accounts. She first appeared in "The Bean Counter" (prog 1790), the first strip after Day of Chaos, where she had a 'meeting' with Dredd in the middle of a riot because he would not come to her office. A highly lethal combatant, in mid-battle she berated Dredd for his contempt towards divisions like Accounts and his lack of paperwork, pointing out the necessity of "bean counters" like her to keep Justice Department functioning.

In "The Cold Deck," she reported to Chief Judge Hershey about the city's crippled finances and advised nationalising the banks that had collapsed, then reclaiming their capital retroactively. Unknown to either of them, she was part of Dredd and Judge Smiley's team investigating Judge Bachmann: after tracking Black Ops' funds to Overdrive Inc, she was mindwiped so that Bachmann would not find out that he had recruited her. Her memory was returned when Black Ops' coup started, as Bachmann's office was right next to Accounts; she was able to rescue a wounded Dredd, patch him up, and hold off Black Ops agents until help arrived. After the coup was stopped, Dredd apologised for doubting her work in Accounts. She was subsequently promoted to head of Accounts Division, as the previous head (and "72.342%" of the division) had been killed in Bachmann's coup.

Maitland has been successful as head of accounts but has found the job stressful due to the constant rebudgeting and more demands with less money being pushed upon her. While looking for a suitable compromise she realised that by spending more on education and social welfare programmes the department could balance the books, dramatically decrease crime and increase the quality and length of their citizens' lives. The Council of Five rejected her proposal and Chief Judge Logan even asked the SJS to begin monitoring her. She took her ideas to Dredd however, who was more receptive and said that he would take them to the Council himself. Logan subsequently authorised Maitland to conduct a pilot scheme in the North West Hab Zone.

The pilot scheme was successful and vindicated her theories but was unpopular with hardliners on the Council. One Judge Hernandez schemed with a wealthy media baron to sabotage the scheme and when Maitland discovered this he freed a mob hitman from the cubes and set her up to be assassinated by him. After her death Hernandez publicly destroyed her image and legacy, burying her success, concealing the data proving her theories correct. Maitland however suspecting her own assassination leaked some of it out and Dredd, although unable to prove it, deduced Hernandez's corruption and involvement in her death.

=== McGruder ===
First appearance: 2000 AD #182 (1980). Created by John Wagner, Alan Grant (writers) and Brian Bolland (artist).

Chief Judge Hilda Margaret McGruder was chief judge of Mega-City One from 2104 to 2108 and again from 2112 to 2116.

After the death of the insane Chief Judge Cal, McGruder was appointed to eliminate corruption from the discredited Special Judicial Squad. She was head of the SJS from 2101 to 2104.

She led the resistance to the invading forces during the Apocalypse War after Chief Judge Griffin was killed and Judge Dredd was taken prisoner. As the only surviving member of the Council of Five after the war, she became chief judge by default. In her first term she established herself as one of the city's most able rulers as she set about rebuilding the war-torn city.

She resigned after four years in office, blaming herself for a massacre she thought she could have prevented (although most of her colleagues were more forgiving and begged her to stay), and took the Long Walk into the Cursed Earth. (Her final act in office was to dismiss all of the senior judges who disagreed with her decision to resign, saying this proved they had poor judgement.) She was succeeded as chief judge by Thomas Silver.

Her years in the Cursed Earth had had a damaging effect on her mental health, leaving her with a volatile temper, cruder mannerisms, and multiple personality syndrome as she began referring to herself using the royal we and arguing with herself. She ran into Dredd during the Necropolis crisis and returned with him to fight the Dark Judges. With Silver missing and presumed dead, she subsequently returned to the office of chief judge.

Her first task was to once more get the city and Judge force back on their feet, as well as to deal with all the dead. She decided not to appoint a Council of Five, but instead take advice from any and all Senior Judges when the time came; in an early such discussion, on Dredd's advice, she agreed to a public referendum over whether the Judges should continue to rule the city.

Her second term became increasingly beset with doubts about the quality of her leadership and her sanity. To cover up the losses of Judges from the recent crises, she began a programme of robot judges which went disastrously wrong. However, she kept trying to revive the Mechanismo project despite clear evidence it was unworkable, and without a formal body like the Council of Five there was no way to oppose her if she would not listen to advice. In 2116 a deputation of senior judges, including Dredd, attempted to persuade her to reform the Council (with a view to then removing her from office), but they were unsuccessful, partly as she realised they would try to do away with her.

Her final attempt to revive Mechanismo caused the robots themselves to try and assassinate her. By this point, Dredd was under arrest for his unlawful attempts to stop the project and McGruder's growing madness had embarrassed her on a tour of the colony world Hestia. When the assassination attempt was uncovered, and when Dredd was the sole reason she (and others) survived it, she pardoned him, scrapped the project, and agreed to stand down from office. She was succeeded by Judge Volt.

Declining to take the Long Walk again, she became a civilian and decided to write her memoirs. In her retirement she developed Alzheimer's disease and her mental health rapidly deteriorated even further. When Judge Dredd heard that she had been scheduled for compulsory euthanasia he abducted her and led her to a more honourable death fighting criminals in the Cursed Earth. The facts of her death were covered up.

A Mega-City One battleship and a street were named after her in her honour.

=== McTighe ===
First appearance: Judge Dredd Megazine vol. 3 #40 (1998). Created by Alan Grant and Andrew Currie.

Tek-Judge McTighe was head of Tek Division. He is the longest-serving head of Tek-Division to appear in the comic, as that office usually tends to have a high rate of turnover. He succeeded Judge McGovern in 2120, and joined the Council of Five shortly afterwards, following the death of Judge Herriman. During the mutant rights vote, Dredd said McTighe was a "yes man" who would vote the way Chief Judge Hershey told him.

He resigned from the Council in 2131, following Hershey's recall from office; he was not invited back when Niles and Buell were. He remained in charge of Tek Division. Following the events of Chaos Day, McTighe was left despondent, believing they had failed to protect the citizens.

He was assassinated in 2000 AD #1940 (2015), in a story set in 2137. It was revealed in #1943 that he had been re-appointed to the Council of Five at some point since the events in the story Trifecta three years earlier.

=== Morphy ===
First appearance: 2000 AD #387 (1984). Created by John Wagner, Alan Grant and Ron Smith.

Judge Morphy was the senior judge who supervised Dredd's Final Assessment to become a full judge, when Dredd was a rookie in 2079. During most of Dredd's career he mentored him, giving advice when needed, and was in many ways a father figure to him. He was killed in the line of duty in 2112, only a few months short of retirement. Dredd took his death very badly and almost murdered one of the killers, restraining himself only at the very last moment. The perpetrators were sentenced to thirty years.

A recurring joke in the series is that Dredd always wears the wrong sized boots. This can actually be traced to Morphy's first appearance, where Dredd confided to his former supervisor that he'd been experiencing doubts about the job. Morphy advised him to requisition a pair of boots two sizes too small: "You'll be so busy cussin' those damned boots you won't have time to worry about anything else."

=== Niles ===
First appearance: 2000 AD #706 (1990). Created by John Wagner and Steve Dillon.

Judge Roger Niles was head of the Special Judicial Squad (internal affairs) until 2122, when Chief Judge Hershey made him head of the Public Surveillance Unit. Chief Judge Sinfield briefly replaced him as head of PSU with Judge Benedetto; Niles was reinstated by Chief Judge Francisco. When Judge Dredd ran against Sinfield in an election, Niles was Dredd's campaign manager. Niles was killed when the Statue of Judgement, which contained PSU headquarters, was destroyed by terrorists in 2134, after 22 years in the comic.

=== Nixon ===
First appearance: 2000 AD #1387 (2004). Created by Rob Williams and Henry Flint.

Judge Aimee Nixon was a corrupt undercover judge. She was eventually arrested and sentenced to 20 years on the Titan penal colony. She was the original lead character in the series Low Life, until that position was taken by Dirty Frank and she became a supporting character. Later she escaped from Titan and became an antagonist in Judge Dredd stories.

=== Oldham ===
First appearance: 2000 AD #1611 (2008). Created by Al Ewing and Simon Fraser.

Judge Oldham was a street judge and irritant for Dredd in several Al Ewing strips. He was a bullying, reactionary judge with a streak of incompetence. In his first appearance he wanted to break a siege with extreme force despite the risk to hostages. Then, when part of the security at the World Sex Championships, he shirked his duties to bully the competitors claiming he was "keeping the deviants in line", and allowed a gunman in. Oldham and Dredd do not like each other. In his first appearance, Oldham implied Dredd was being "soft" due his mutant sympathies.

Dredd recommended that Oldham be moved to meat-wagon duties. Instead, Oldham was made a Senior Judge under Judge Sinfield and given authority over the older Judge Giant, as a rebuke to Dredd's old ally. During this time, he shot an unarmed mutant and showed no concern. When Sinfield was deposed, Giant became the dominant partner and tried to turn Oldham around. Despite some progress, Oldham made some basic mistakes in an operation and was shot dead by an escaped killer.

=== Omar ===
First appearance: 2000 AD #361 (1984). Created by John Wagner, Alan Grant and Brett Ewans.

Psi-Judge Omar became head of Psi Division after his predecessor Ecks was killed in the Apocalypse War. He personally assisted Judge Dredd in his investigation into the haunting of a sector house, and later he exonerated Judge Anderson when she was accused of negligently permitting the Dark Judges to escape and threaten the city. When psi-criminal Shojun the Warlord unleashed the demonic Seven Samurai on the city, Omar volunteered to sacrifice his own life in a suicide attack to destroy them using a psionic amplifier. He was succeeded as head of Psi-Division by Judge Shenker.

=== Pepper ===
First appearance: 2000 AD #91 (1978). Created by John Wagner and Mike McMahon.

Judge Pepper was deputy chief judge from 2101 to 2103, succeeding DCJ Grampus.

After losing a leg in the 21st century he retired from active service and became a tutor at the Academy of Law, where he taught many of the city's most important and senior judges while they were cadets, including teaching Applied Leadership to both Judge Dredd and future chief judge Cal. When Chief Judge Cal became insane Pepper volunteered to fight with Dredd to depose the tyrant. In the moment of victory Dredd was offered the position of chief judge, but he declined in favour of Judge Griffin. Griffin then appointed Pepper as his deputy.

Two years later Pepper was assassinated by game show contestants from a reality television show, in which contestants gained points by confessing to crimes they had not yet been caught for. Pepper's death led to the show being taken off the air. An artist oversight in this story saw him die with the full complement of two legs.

=== Perrier ===
First appearance: 2000 AD #255 (1982). Created by John Wagner, Alan Grant and Carlos Ezquerra.

Judge Perrier first appeared in the story "The Apocalypse War", fighting the Sovs at the frontline. She did not appear again until years later when writer Garth Ennis took over the strip and brought her back in "A Clockwork Pineapple". She was then killed off in "Judgement Day", swarmed by zombies before she could reach the city.

=== Pin ===
SJS Judge Bela Pin was an elderly judge who after suffering a mental breakdown on Chaos Day began to murder judges who fail to meet up to her exacting standards, but who she is unable to punish through official channels. Blaming Dredd for the state of the city after Chaos Day she began a vindictive vendetta against him and his closest allies. She killed Judge Gerhart and seriously injured Dredd and Judge Maitland before Dredd was able to knock her into an open burial pit where she was eaten by rats.

=== Prager ===
First appearance: 2000 AD #328 (1983). Created by John Wagner, Alan Grant and Steve Dillon.

Judge Prager is one of the judges who chose to take the Long Walk into the Undercity rather than the Cursed Earth. After four years he made his first appearance in prog 328, when he saved Judge Dredd who had been transformed into a werewolf. He next appeared decades later to warn the judges of a new threat to the city from Bones, but at the same time reveals he has been infected and transforms into a werewolf at each full moon. Declining the cure and in his wolf form, he helped Dredd defeat Bones' army. Impressed with Prager, Dredd offered him the opportunity to return to the city as a reinstated Judge but Prager declined, admitting he liked the wolf transformation, and that the Undercity was now his domain.

=== Ramos ===
First appearance: Judge Dredd Megazine vol. 3 issue 54 (1999). Created by John Wagner and Andrew Currie.

Judge Hoolio Ramos was head of Street Division on the Council of Five under Chief Judge Hershey. In 2130 he was sent to Titan in disgrace after Dredd uncovered crimes he had committed thirty years before, when he was part of a group of vigilante judges who had taken it upon themselves to execute criminals that the law could not legitimately touch. The truth about these crimes was suppressed, and the public told that Ramos was simply being moved to a new posting off-world.

=== Renga ===
First appearance: 2000 AD #1033 (1997). Created by John Wagner and Sean Phillips.

One of the four cadets involved in the "Hunting Party" storyline, Renga had briefly worked undercover in a juve gang for Wally Squad; the experiences left him disgruntled and antisocial as well as sporting a gang tattoo (which was later removed). His attitude caused him to clash with Dredd while on a mission to locate the source of Dr. Bolt's Dune Sharks. After a disastrous attempt to 'save' a Cursed Earth girl from a ritual (which meant the end of her community), it appeared that he was going to be expelled from the Academy. However, he distinguished himself when he was part of a group of Judges that was temporarily thrown back in time to Erie, Pennsylvania during the start of the Atomic Wars, as well as in the final clash against the Dune Sharks, and so Dredd gave him a second chance.

After he graduated from the Academy, he was personally chosen by Dredd to assist in the Fargo mission in "Origins." He also appeared in the story "The Scorpion Dance".

=== Rico ===
First appearance: 2000 AD #1186 (2000). Created by John Wagner and Simon Fraser.

Rico is a street judge cloned from the same DNA as Dredd. Since Judges Joe Dredd and Rico Dredd were cloned from the DNA of Chief Judge Fargo in 2066, at least eight further clones of the Fargo bloodline have been produced by the Mega-City One Justice Department. The first of these to graduate from the Academy of Law was given his final street assessment by Joe Dredd in 2122. His original name was Dredd, so to avoid complication at dispatch, on receiving his full eagle the clone took the surname Rico, in honour of the late Rico Dredd. He has no first name. During his first five years as a cadet, he had been in the Texas City academy of law, before returning to Mega-City One.

After a short period with the traffic division, Rico was assigned to Sector 108, where he overcame his colleagues' resentment at his ancestry and hardline attitude, and proved himself to be a brave and resourceful judge. He has a strong bond with his clone brother Joe Dredd (although Dredd is old enough to be his father), and when the older man's living quarters were moved to the Grand Hall of Justice, Rico took over his apartment in Rowdy Yates Block.

While serving in Sector 108 Rico had to have one of his lungs replaced with an artificial one following an injury in the line of duty. Later he suffered a gunshot wound to the jaw, but has since had this replaced with a synthetic copy.

When Mega-City One's mutant citizens were exiled to townships in the Cursed Earth, Rico was one of the judges sent to supervise them, under Dredd's command. When Dredd returned to the city he left Rico in charge. Rico led a contingent of mutant volunteers back to the city to help rebuild it following the disastrous events of the story Day of Chaos.

=== Roffman ===
First appearance: 2000 AD #1102 (1998). Created by John Wagner and Carlos Ezquerra.

Judge Roffman works in the Public Surveillance Unit. He originally served in the SJS in Sector 301, but was transferred to Street Division in Sector 303 after bugging his superior officer's office. Due to his inexperience he bungled a raid and inadvertently discharged his weapon, shooting and wounding another judge. Suspended from duty, his efforts to make amends (again by spying on his new commanding officer) backfired and almost resulted in the end of his career. Instead Judge Edgar, head of PSU, recognised that his suspicious and devious character made him ideally suited to surveillance work, and she recruited him.

He flourished in his new role, and continues to assist Judge Dredd in investigations, including tracking a possible rogue judge in Sector House and carrying out spy work in Lawcon. He was also forcibly teamed up with Galen DeMarco during the Second Robot War, showing cowardice and amorality much to Galen's disgust. These flaws would later save the day at Lawcon, which was undergoing infiltration by shape-shifting genocidal aliens: when the infiltrators tried to draw him into a trap by calling for help, Roffman (unlike other law enforcers) simply ignored them, leaving him free and able to help expose the infiltration to Dredd later.

He distinguished himself years later in the search for the members of the Total War terrorism organisation when they began detonating nuclear bombs around the city. Most of his appearances since then have shown him working remotely from PSU.

Roffman was severely injured in 2134 when his office in PSU headquarters was destroyed during the story Day of Chaos (2012), losing both his legs and his sphincter, which required artificial and clone-grown replacements. Dredd was quietly angry that Roffman had been moved to the head of the queue when hundreds of other judges were allowed to rot in hospital. Despite his feelings, in The Cold Deck he turned to Roffman for help in finding stolen Justice Department data, without telling him what it was. Roffman was left horrified when he learnt it was a gold clearance file and that Dredd had failed to stop it being transferred, and after he discovered the file contained a list of undercover judges, he reported it to Bachmann as it was "too big" to leave to Dredd.

=== Sanchez ===
First appearance: 2000 AD #2003 (2002). Created by John Wagner, Andy Diggle and Henry Flint.

Judge Sanchez was a newly graduated Judge when Mr. Bones released the Incubus on Mega-City One. She fought alongside Dredd and Judge Giant in the defence of the Grand Hall of Justice but it appeared the strain would break her. However, the various perils (including being impregnated by the Incubus) helped mould her into a strong judge. Consequently, she was chosen as one of the team assisting Dredd in his mission to rescue Chief Judge Fargo from his kidnappers in the Cursed Earth (in the story "Origins"). She states during this time that she is not sure she agrees with the Justice Department's policy of celibacy for Judges.

=== Shenker ===
First appearance: 2000 AD #457 (1986). Created by John Wagner, Alan Grant and Cliff Robinson.

Judge Shenker became head of Psi Division in 2108, and was at the same time appointed to the Council of Five by outgoing Chief Judge McGruder. In 2122 he was dismissed from the Council by Chief Judge Hershey because of the disappointing performance of his division, but he remained head of the division until 2144, when he resigned. He was succeeded as head of Psi-Division by Judge Shakta.

=== Silver ===
First appearance: 2000 AD #457 (1986). Created by John Wagner, Alan Grant and Cliff Robinson.

Judge Thomas Silver was chief judge of Mega-City One between 2108 and 2112.

He began his career as a street judge, serving during the Atomic War and the Second American Civil War. To his later shame, in the early 2070s he was one of the many judges who agreed with Morton Judd's ideas of genetically altering the citizens to be more docile. In 2096 he was wounded in action and compelled to retire from active service. He became principal lecturer in Applied Violence at the Academy of Law.

In 2108 Chief Judge McGruder resigned and left the city on the Long Walk. One of her final acts as chief judge was to appoint Silver to the Council of Five, the city's highest legislature. The Council unanimously chose Silver for the highest office.

Silver quickly proved to be the most right-wing, hardline chief judge the city had ever seen. In 2109 he ordered a crack-down on the Democracy movement (a loose affiliation of organisations dedicated to democratic reform ever since the Justice Department usurped the elected government of the United States in 2070), putting Judge Dredd in personal charge of a secret campaign to smear the protest groups' leaders and to sabotage their efforts at peaceful demonstration. Undercover judges placed among the protesters turned a peaceful protest march into a violent riot, giving Dredd the excuse he needed to attack the march with riot squads and make mass arrests. Silver used the ensuing massacre as an example of the dangers of democracy and the need for the iron rule of the judges. Armed with this excuse to tighten control, he took every opportunity to do so.

Dredd's own responsibility for the deaths at the march, and the corrupt way in which the law had been enforced fed his doubts about the integrity of the system to which he had belonged since birth. When in 2112 a young boy was brutally murdered by a man who had been brain-damaged by a judge during the Democratic March, Dredd's reservations came to a head and he tendered his resignation and took the Long Walk himself. Silver reacted by ordering a news blackout on Dredd's resignation, and covered it up by going so far as to replace Dredd with an imposter, Judge Kraken, a clone from the same DNA as Dredd. Silver believed that Dredd had become such an important figure of law-enforcement in the public mind that his departure, if it became known, would incite an intolerable increase in crime.

Silver's judgement proved to be fatal, as only weeks later Kraken's loyalty was turned against the city, precipitating a catastrophe which resulted in the whole city falling under enemy occupation with the loss of 60 million lives. (See main article Necropolis.) Silver despaired recovering the situation and fled the command centre in Mega-City One's darkest hour of need. He attempted to commit suicide but botched the job, and was captured alive. He was murdered by Judge Death and then reanimated as a zombie, but with all his mental faculties intact so that he could be tormented endlessly while his city was systematically extinguished of all life.

So ended Silver's life, but not his undeath. When Dredd returned to rescue his city, Silver again fled and hid, fearing that in his undead state he would be summarily destroyed by the survivors of the disaster. Only when several months had passed did he dare to return to the city. On arriving once more in his Grand Hall of Justice in 2113, he discovered that in his absence his predecessor, McGruder, had reclaimed her office. He challenged her right to be chief judge, pointing out that she had resigned as chief judge whereas he had not. McGruder retorted that Silver was medically dead. However, since McGruder had dissolved the Council of Five there was no recognised authority with the power to decide the issue. The constitutional crisis was finally resolved when both litigants agreed to abide by Judge Dredd's verdict. Dredd actually ruled in Silver's favour, but then convicted him of gross dereliction of duty for deserting his command in time of war. Dredd executed Silver by incinerating him, and McGruder became chief judge by default. Silver went neither quietly nor with any dignity, crying and pleading for mercy. His incinerated remains were unceremoniously swept away by a cleaner, a truly ignoble end for a head of state. Silver's ghost haunts the Grand Hall of Justice.

=== Smiley ===
Judge Smiley was appointed head of a special "black operations" unit by Chief Judge Griffin in 2101, after Judge Cal's reign of terror. His role was to work in the background as "a judge to judge the judges who judge the judges," to protect the city from a future coup d'état by another corrupt judge like Cal. One of his missions drove Judge Frank insane; Smiley arranged for him to be transferred to Wally Squad. He was also responsible for gathering a squad of rogue ex-judges for various operations, including agent Miss Anne Thrope: she was used to manipulate undercover judge Jack Point into working for Smiley, and tried to explicitly recruit him as an agent.

After the "Judgement Day" conflict in 2114, Smiley disappeared and was presumed dead, Judge Bachmann duly replacing him as head of his unit. Smiley had actually moved into a secret psi-shielded office hidden in the Grand Hall of Justice, where he remained out of sight for 20 years, covertly monitoring the Justice Department and waiting until he was needed, although he mentions to Hershey that he has influenced many events in the city since his disappearance. Eventually the threat he had been preparing for turned out to be Bachmann herself, who in 2134 plotted to seize control of the city. Smiley recruited a team of judges to investigate her – a team so secretive that to prevent their discovery Smiley suppressed their memories of his existence and their objectives, using a post-hypnotic command to reawaken them when needed. They succeeded in defeating Bachmann, who was killed by Smiley himself. Both Hershey and Frank were angered by Smiley's tactics: Hershey because Smiley could have brought her on board at any time and deliberately left her out of the loop, and Frank because Smiley had deliberately let hundreds of people die in order to force Bachmann into the open. Hershey openly suggested that they had "swapped one problem for another".

When Dredd was abducted in 2136, Smiley told Hershey she didn't need to worry about Dredd's safety; he seemed unconcerned about the impact on Justice Department of Dredd being seen to be defeated.

The character Judge Smiley honours the John le Carré character George Smiley, an important supporting character and later central character in many of his post-war espionage stories.

=== Solomon ===
First appearance: 2000 AD #68 (1978). Created by Pat Mills and Mike McMahon.

Judge Hollins Solomon succeeded Judge Fargo as Chief Judge of the United States in 2051, and in the following year became Chief Judge of Mega-City One, when Mega-City Two and Texas City acquired their own chief judges for the first time. In 2058 he resigned and was succeeded by his deputy, Clarence Goodman (with whom he had served as joint deputy chief judge under Fargo). Instead of appointing a new deputy chief judge, Goodman appointed a Council of Five to advise him, and Solomon served on the Council from its inception until after the judges seized power from the president and Congress in 2070. In 2071 Solomon presided over the war crimes trial of President Bob Booth, sentencing him to 100 years in suspended animation so that a future generation could decide what to do with him. It is not known what became of Solomon after that, but he had only appeared in Judge Dredd stories in flashbacks in The Cursed Earth and Origins (until 2022, when he and all other deceased former Chief Judges appeared as ghosts haunting a citizen).

=== Stark ===
First appearance: 2000 AD #1033 (1997). Created by John Wagner and Sean Phillips.

A Brit-Cit exchange cadet, Stark applied for full transfer to Mega-City One. He first appeared in The Hunting Party, undergoing a hotdog run under Dredd and tracking down dune sharks; he showed himself to be a capable Judge and bonded with fellow cadet Renga. He would later be part of Dredd's team during the Second Robot War, helping liberate the city: it was his suggestion that they reprogram Narcos' Assassinator droids and use them against him.

When sent undercover to combat a block mafia in Shirley Temple Block, Stark was infected with Grubb's Disease by a mob boss – as was his partner, an old comrade of Stark's who he'd brought in on the operation. Driven mad by the death and the terminal infection, he killed himself to infect the mob boss. His body was returned to Brit-Cit.

=== Steel ===
Judge Amy Steel was the sidekick of Dredd in David Bishop's Judge Dredd audios for Big Finish. An exchange Cadet from Brit-Cit, she was a competent and bright-minded young Judge, assisting Dredd in several cases including against Judge Death; during her rookie assessment, she destroyed the Frendz syndicate's hovership headquarters and took out its current boss. It was eventually revealed that her stepfather was infamous Brit-Cit gangster Harry Karter, who she believed had killed her father when she was a young child; in fact, it turned out she had (accidentally) killed him, and her mother had made a deal with Karter to erase this from her mind. While Karter was brought down, Amy Steel was psychologically damaged and turned in her Judge badge. Amy Steel was played by Claire Buckfield.

=== Vass ===
Judge Vass is (or was) a senior judge and became a member of the Council of Five in 2132.

During Day of Chaos, he clashed with General Poll over the fate of civilian hostages and found Poll's comments about street Judge ineffectiveness "uncalled for". Despite this, he voted in favour of air strikes that would doom the hostages. When the Chaos Virus reached the city anyway, Vass proposed rounding up the first-stage infected, flying them to Cursed Earth burial pits on the pretence of taking them to a medical facility, and then killing them en route. Chief Judge Francisco condemned this as "monstrous" and refused to do it, but the proposal was leaked to the public and caused a citywide uprising. Vass was left horrified by what he had inadvertently caused and resigned, returning to the streets. It is not known whether he survived.

=== Volt ===
First appearance: 2000 AD #917 (1994). Created by John Wagner and Carlos Ezquerra.

Chief Judge Hadrian Volt was chief judge from 2116 to 2121.

Volt became a street judge in 2096 and fought in the First Robot War and the Apocalypse War. He later served in the Special Judicial Squad and in the Aliens Bureau. In 2114 he was promoted to chief of Sector 53, where his outstanding administrative ability and judgement reduced violent crime in his sector to the second lowest level in the city.

When Chief Judge McGruder resigned her office in 2116, there was no Council of Five to choose a new chief judge in the normal way, since she had dissolved the Council years earlier. Therefore, she ordered that her successor be elected by the city's 400 Senior Judges. After careful consideration, Volt decided to stand as a candidate in this unprecedented election, and polled a clear majority of the votes (208), defeating three other candidates, including Judge Dredd himself. (Ironically most people had believed that Dredd would win, but – as Dredd himself observed – he had annoyed too many judges over the years. Dredd even voted for Volt himself!)

Volt immediately set about instituting significant constitutional reforms. He reinstated the Council and permanently established the new system of electing chief judges. In 2117 he restored the obsolete office of Mayor of Mega-City One and created a council of elected citizens to give the people more say in how they were governed (although ultimate power continued to reside with the Justice Department). He also established a policy of encouraging the judges to foster better relations with the community.

He was also the author of two books: Riding the Apocalypse, a history of the Apocalypse War, and Just Justice, setting out his ideas for legal and political reforms.

In many ways Volt proved to be an outstanding chief judge. But when the city was overrun in the Second Robot War of 2121 he blamed himself for having failed to do enough to prevent it. Even when the war was ultimately won, the burden of personal responsibility weighed too heavily on his mind for him to bear. He waited until the bitter end, and then at the moment of victory he shot himself.

But the general public would never be told the truth. Acting Chief Judge Hershey decided that in the aftermath of such a cataclysmic conflict the Judges' interests required a more heroic death for their fallen leader. The Public Deception Unit therefore set about concocting a false story in which Volt had died valiantly in combat, and fabricated the evidence to prove it.

Volt was the perfect Judge to reform the Justice System which under his two predecessors had become badly corrupt and damaged. Ultimately however he simply was not up to the job of wartime leader. This has however been true of many chief judges, with power usually passing to Dredd in times of crisis, as seen for example in the Apocalypse War and Necropolis.

Volt was succeeded by Deputy Chief Judge Hershey, who was elected chief judge in her own right in early 2122.

== Other judges ==
=== Armitage ===
See Armitage

=== Bruce ===
A judge in the Sydney-Melbourne Conurb, Judge Lenny Bruce was Dredd's liaison and partner when Dredd came to Australia on the trail of both the Judda and Chopper in 2110. Bruce was a highly laid-back officer, stunned a bit by his American counterpart's more brutal methods. He eventually tired of Dredd's obsession with catching Chopper, who had broken no Oz laws, and snapped at him and overrode Dredd's authority, allowing Chopper safe passage. Later, when StigCorp was targeting Chopper, the skysurfer tried to contact Bruce for aid – the judge was transferred to Chunder Range before that could happen.

When Judgement Day broke out in 2114, Judge Bruce both battled the zombies in Oz and later died as part of the multi-national Judge force sent to end the crisis. Before his death, he showed friendly relations with both Judge-Sergeant Joyce and Johnny Alpha. His first name was revealed during the Judgement Day serial.

=== Bulgarin and Kazan ===
Supreme Judge Bulgarin was ruler of East Meg One until the Apocalypse War. He delegated the invasion of Mega-City One to his most trusted general, War Marshal Kazan. However Bulgarin's confidence was misplaced as Kazan assassinated him and took his place. Kazan was executed by Dredd at the end of the war.

=== Ava Eastwood ===
Deadworld's American equivalent of Dredd. She was a lesbian and in a relationship with her partner Judge Leigh. When her and Leigh's relationship was discovered by Judge De'Ath he sent Judge Fairfax to lure them into an ambush where he murdered Leigh in front of her. Afterwards she disappeared retreating to a small house in the suburbs of the capital, but never formally resigned nor was she struck off the active roster. After many years Judge Death pulled his coup took control of the Judges, she noticed the death and destruction brought unto her neighbourhood and decided to re-emerge from hiding in search of answers and revenge. Deadworlds American Justice Departments advanced AI computer network the "Judge Cloud" is based on her personality.

=== Fairfax ===
A Deadworld judge was the last official Chief Judges "fixer", and protege of Sidney De'Ath (Judge Death). A brutal, violent and sadistic man in both his work and private life, when he heard of a coup in the Capital and the massacres and riots that followed he chose to flee to the old Chiefs safe house in the Fracklands some distance away. On route he came across a family of farmers and decided to use them to aid his escape, unaware that Death had asked he be found and recruited to become his 5th Dark Judge. After a short time only Fairfax and youngest daughter of the family, Jess Childs, were left after encountering the Judges sent to find him. During this time Fairfax when through a change in personality becoming less violent, more open and highly protective of Jess. He told her how he had been kept on a regime of drugs his whole life to make him what he was and now in withdrawal he began to realise what he and other judges had done to their world. They joined up with a resistance group but were attacked by Judge Fear and Fairfax was captured and taken to Death where he was tortured for months and repeatedly injected with "Dead Fluids" to transform him into a Dark Judge. Jess and small group of resistance fighters managed to infiltrate Sector House 13 where he was being held in and rescued him before the process was fully complete, and while he was changed physically, mentally was still himself.

=== Izaaks & Buratino ===
Izaaks was originally second in command to War Marshal Kazan during the Apocalypse War but due to many defeats that were unfairly blamed on him he was demoted to cadet. After East Meg Ones destruction and with massive losses on the battlefields he freed Dredd from a Sov torturer and convinced the rest of the Sov commanders to allow Dredd to kill Kazan and then to declare an unconditional surrender to Mega City One, he was sent back to the Sov territories and was not seen again for 38 years.

In 2142 Dredd encountered Izaaks again, now an intelligence chief in East Meg Two along with Buratino the head of the East Meg Two psi division. They helped Dredd defeat the Four Horsemen of the Apocalypse despite being under orders to use War as a weapon against Mega City One. In the aftermath they both defected to Mega City One being place in charge of certain "experiments in the unusual". Buratino resembles a young child with a grossly oversized head but informs Dredd that he is older than him and may be an even more powerful psi then Anderson.

=== Joyce ===
Judge-Sergeant Charlie Joyce is an Irish Judge. He has a wife and son; Murphyville having a more liberal approach to its Judge Militia than other mega-cities.

He partnered with Dredd when Dredd was sent to Ireland to extradite a suspect in 2113, with his laidback approach to law enforcement and fondness for drink annoying the Mega-City Judge; for his part, he tried to get Dredd to relax. While skilled in combat, Joyce was left horrified when the Sons of Erin dissidents, under guidance from a Mega-City mob blitzer, launched a brutal terrorist attack: "I'd have never believed it."

In the following year, during the Judgement Day crisis, he defended Murphyville from zombie hordes. He was supposed to accompany Dredd on a suicide mission to kill the necromagus Sabbat, and cheerfully backed Dredd as the best candidate for leading the mission, but he was knocked unconscious and replaced by Johnny Alpha. He saw out the crisis in Hondo City instead, fighting in the last battle at Hondo's walls.

He was sent on a hazardous extradition assignment to Mega-City One soon after. After trying to put up with the more violent city and Dredd and Hershey's unfriendly attitude, he was seriously wounded and finally snapped at Dredd: on his way back home, he told him "you can stick your Mega-City." The 2135-set story "New Tricks" implies that Joyce has since died. His son Fintan Joyce became a Judge as well, starting in 2132. Fintan had grown up wanting to be a Mega-City One Judge and in 2135, he was transferred to the American city (severely lacking in Judges after Chaos Day). Despite his courage, he had trouble adjusting.

=== Anatoli Kazan ===
Anatoli Kazan is the crippled clone son of War Marshal Kazan. He was originally a cadet of East Meg Two and was a thorn in Judge Dredd's side, attacking him through his niece Vienna. He later defected to Mega-City One where he offered to help Defence Division. Dredd was highly suspicious of Kazan's true motives and persuaded the Chief Judge not to trust him, but the Council of Five overruled them and voted to employ Kazan (under strict supervision). Kazan's advice and inside information led to Mega-City One's regime change action in Ciudad Barranquilla, in order to prevent a Sov attempt to do the same; Kazan was drawn looking sinister at the end of the story, suggesting a deeper agenda to his actions.

Kazan seemed likely to become a significant villain in future stories by writer Gordon Rennie, until Rennie announced his retirement from writing comics in 2008. In 2012 writer Al Ewing brought the character back, in a story described by the editor as a prelude to coming events. (In this story, Kazan remarked "and here I thought you'd forgotten me")

Following the events of the Day of Chaos, Dredd advocated killing Kazan: he found it suspicious that "the one time you don't have info on the Sovs is when they're about to hit us". Kazan denied this, pointing out he'd been cut off from the Sovs for the last seven years and would have outdated intelligence. He also showed he had outside sources and knew that the Council of Five was being reorganised, and felt the new Undercover Operations regime would be keeping him alive.

Kazan was assassinated on the orders of Judge Smiley in 2140.

Kazan first appeared in 2000 AD #1383, and was killed in #2104.

=== 'Timbo' Parkerston-Trant ===
Detective Judge Timothy Parkerston-Trant was an upper-class Judge on track to making senior rank, who – after the death of the Star Chamber – is one of the few such men not purged from Senior Judge ranks as he's got actual detective skill. His great-uncle "Fluffy" was a member of the Council of the Star Chamber. Nobody wanted to work with him due to his overbearingly cheery nature, until Armitage took him as a partner out of desperation; he asks everyone to call him Timbo, but only Armitage and Treasure Steel actually do.

=== Treasure Steel ===
A Detective-Judge in Brit-Cit, Steel is a long-term partner of Armitage and her first task as a rookie was to apprentice with him. She has much the same views on her job and the city as Armitage, though unlike him she possesses a home life with her wife Terri and their son.

She was actually created and programmed as a 'sleeper' assassin at a secret facility in the Manchester ruins, with false memory implants. The memory wipe began to break down in 2131, causing her to start thinking she'd grown up in an orphanage in Manchester (something that everyone knew could not be possible) and become more violent, causing her to be committed to a psychiatric ward for a time. According to Armitage, she was terminated from the project and farmed out to Justice Department instead of being sold to the criminal Overlords, but she is not entirely sure he was telling her the truth.

As well as appearing in the Armitage comic series in the Judge Dredd Megazine, Steel has also appeared in three novels by Dave Stone: Deathmasques (Virgin Books, 1993), The Medusa Seed (Virgin, 1994) and Psykogeddon (Black Flame, 2006).

== Perpetrators ==
=== The Angel Gang ===
The Angel Gang are a family of hillbillies often causing trouble. They were killed off during the Judge Child story; however, Mean Machine was brought back for later stories over the next three decades.

The members were Pa, the patriarch of the clan; Fink, a sadistic mutant; Link, Junior, and Mean. Later stories introduced Fink's son Ratfink and Mean's son Junior (the only family member who wasn't evil).

==== Mean Machine Angel ====
The third son of the notorious Angel Gang, Mean Machine is a large hulking man with cybernetics, including a dial on his head which controls the power of his cybernetically enhanced headbutts.

He made his first appearance in 1980 in the Judge Child story arc, alongside his family who are used by the titular child to be his pawns until he later kills them once they have served their purpose. Mean Machine himself was killed by Judge Dredd in the same story, but due to his popularity he was later revived and became one of Dredd's long standing foes, usually but not always in comedy stories. He would later father a son named Mean Junior from his ex-wife.

Dredd last met Mean in a story published in 2007, in which Mean had become so old and frail that he was paroled since he was no longer a danger to the public.

=== Don Uggie Apelino ===
Don Uggie Apelino was a genetically altered intelligent ape who encountered Dredd several times – first during a gang war, and later after a foiled attempt to have Dredd assassinated. After the Apocalypse War, radiation regressed his intelligence to that of a normal ape, whereupon he led a group of insane and brutal apes in the Cursed Earth. Dredd followed a regressed Fast Eeek, and executed the gang – including Apelino – as a danger to Mega City residents.

In the IDW Publishing 2013 series "Mars Attacks Judge Dredd", Apelino features with his intelligence intact as a major character in the plot – initially the leader of a mafia syndicate in sector 301, then later assisting Dredd and Anderson in the fight against the Martians once his gang has been eliminated. (IDW's stories are not necessarily on the same canon as 2000 AD's.)

Apelino was often accompanied by his two henchmen Fast Eeek and Joe Bananas.

=== Judge Bachmann ===
Judge Carolyn Bachmann is a character in the Judge Dredd comic strip appearing in British comics 2000 AD and the Judge Dredd Megazine. She was the main villain in the 2012 stories "The Cold Deck" and "Trifecta".

Al Ewing told SFX "Originally, Bachmann was just someone for Dredd to bounce off, so the second half of that story could take place in real time, a month after the first half. And then it turned out that she was very popular, so I felt that I needed to finish her story quickly, so she wasn't just another Dredd villain simmering in the background for years and years, which was why I pushed for her to be the Big Bad of ‘Trifecta’. It was literally me saying, ‘I have a villain going spare, can we use her?’"

Bachmann first appeared in "Family Man" in Judge Dredd Megazine #313 (2011), but in 2000 AD #1809 she was retroactively stated to have been in charge of Black Ops Division for many years before and deliberately kept out of sight. It was later revealed that she had been appointed by Chief Judge McGruder in 2114 and had been involved in protecting the city during the various disasters since then. When Hershey came to power, Bachmann was waiting and began to make herself indispensable.

Her Black Ops agents were secretly programmed by her to revere Mega-City One as a holy "God City," and called Bachmann "Your Holiness." Chief Judge Hershey described Bachmann as "vicious, underhanded – power-mad, even," but careful to cover up any trace of illegal action. Unknown to Hershey, since 2128 Bachmann had been using her black budget to develop an alliance with the firm Overdrive Incorporated, who began building a secret "Luna-2" megacity on the moon.

When Dredd first met Bachmann in Megazine #313, she claimed to just be administration staff (it later turned out she really did deal with office supplies as a hobby), but he was aware she was really Black Ops. He suspected her of orchestrating a series of murders, including of a judge and mutant deputies, in Township Three in the Cursed Earth. Bachmann as good as admitted that she had done this, and arranged for a less mutant-friendly judge to take command of the township. She threatened Dredd and advised him to leave the matter alone.

In 2134, following the citywide devastation of "Day of Chaos" (2011–12), Chief Judge Hershey announced that Bachmann would be joining the Council of Five as the head of a new Undercover Operations Division, which would also include the Special Judicial Squad (internal affairs). Dredd was outraged, saying it was like putting "a cockroach in charge of the exterminators", but he had no proof that she was corrupt. SJS chief Judge Buell, who now reported to her, worried that she might become chief judge in a few years and that she was preparing to reorganise Undercover to grab power. Neither Buell nor Dredd, however, were aware that Hershey had put Bachmann on the Council in order to force her into a public position, where she could not hide. For her part, Hershey was not aware that Bachmann was spying on her, and any other opponent, with a secret psi-judge.

Bachmann was the antagonist of Trifecta (2012). Soon after her promotion, she brainwashed Wally Squad chief Judge Folger into downloading a file with the identities of every undercover Judge and Mega-City spy, arranging for it to be passed onto the corrupt Overdrive Inc. (Folger was accidentally killed in the attempt.) Buell discovered Folger's body and that the file had gone missing, but was unaware of what the file contained or that Bachmann was involved. Afraid she would use that as an excuse for a "reorganisation", Buell asked Dredd to find the file so they would not have to inform Bachmann, just as she had expected. The file was sent to Overdrive Inc., while Bachmann ordered Black Ops to kill every name on the list so she could "restock" the Squad with her own men. Meanwhile, she was brainwashing large numbers of rich citizens with the "Church of Simpology" organisation, both creating a secondary army and indoctrinating the owner of a company that made sleep machines: this would allow her to brainwash judges as well. Her end goal was to seize power, bring Luna-2 down from the moon, and create a theocratic regime where the people would ascend to "heaven" (Luna-2) and any troublesome elements would be condemned to "hell" (Mega-City One). As far as she was concerned, the Justice Department model no longer worked.

However Bachmann was not aware that the list had been swapped for another list by an agent working for Judge Smiley, her predecessor as head of Black Ops, who was investigating her and Overdrive Inc.. Smiley had secretly recruited Judge Dredd and other judges in order to expose and destroy her. When she realised that her plan had been discovered, she tried to gain power by overt force, ordering her men to kill everyone in the Grand Hall of Justice and attempting to take the chief judge as a hostage. However her men were defeated by Dredd, Hershey, Jack Point, "Dirty" Frank and Galen DeMarco. Bachmann was able to physically overpower her opponents and was about to kill Dredd when Smiley himself appeared and killed her.

=== Bella Bagley ===
Bella Bagley was an unlucky-in-love woman who fell in love with Dredd. When he rejected her advances she became insane and had to be incarcerated in the psycho-cubes. Escaping twice, on the second occasion she finally decided to kill Dredd in a fit of jealousy and was shot dead.

=== Mr Bones ===
Mr Bones (original name Dan Riboshevsky) was born in Mega-City One in 2084. Routine scanning showed he had a genetic predisposition for evil and he was expelled from the city to live with other mutants in the Cursed Earth. He returned and entered the Undercity to raise an army, but when this was foiled he returned with an even more deadly threat – the Xenomorph. He came across them when he left the Cursed Earth for a career as a space pirate. It is their acid blood which disfigured him and he died when they turned on him.

=== President Robert L. Booth ===
President Robert Linus Booth or Bad Bob Booth was the last president of the United States.

Booth was governor of Texas City, America's third mega-city, and then in 2060 he was elected vice president, with President Harvisson. He became president during Harvisson's second term, and rigged the 2068 election to become president in his own right, murdering an aide who was about to implicate him. In 2070 he started a nuclear world war, which devastated the planet, and most of America outside its three mega-cities became an irradiated wasteland populated by mutants and bandits, the "Cursed Earth." As a result, the president and Congress were overthrown, democratic government was abolished (except at the municipal level), and each mega-city became an independent city state ruled by its unelected chief judge.

After a bloody civil war in which over 100,000 soldiers and street judges lost their lives, Booth was captured and put on trial in 2071. The presiding judge, Judge Solomon, was reluctant to execute the last US president, so he sentenced him to 100 years in suspended animation in the deepest vault in Fort Knox, so that a future generation could decide what to do with him.

In 2100 Booth's suspended animation was interrupted, and Judge Dredd re-sentenced Booth to hard labour for life on a farm in the Cursed Earth. However Booth raised an army of mutants, the New Mutant Army, intending to overthrow the Judges and become president again. When Dredd was sent to deal with him, he captured Dredd and put him on trial for treason against the United States (although Dredd had been a child in 2070, he had participated in the Judges' assault on the White House). Dredd escaped and used Booth as a human shield, but Booth's men – underpaid and demoralised – opened fire anyway, reasoning that if they wanted another president then they could always elect one.

=== Borisenko ===
Colonel Yevgeny Borisenko was the mastermind of a plan to destroy Mega-City One in 2134, in the story Day of Chaos (2011–12). He succeeded in wiping out seven eighths of the population by infecting them with a deadly biological weapon. He was a soldier of East-Meg One who had survived the Apocalypse War in 2104, but had been blinded by the flash of the nuclear detonation which destroyed his home city, and had harboured a desire for vengeance ever since. He was captured by Judge Dredd but murdered by one of his sleeper agents during interrogation, after living for long enough to see his plan succeed.

=== Call-Me-Kenneth ===
Call-Me-Kenneth was a robot who appointed himself as leader of all rogue robots during the First Robot War. Kenneth was a carpentry droid driven to rebel by his poor treatment by his owner. Kenneth, equipped with a chainsaw, attacked a number of humans and nearly killed Dredd before being disabled. The Judges then had Kenneth rebuilt, so that scientists could determine what made him break the laws of robotics. Drawn by Ron Turner (the original version was designed by Carlos Ezquerra), this version is more human like and is equipped with a large drill and a third eye. Accidentally reactivated he instead went on the rampage again and raised a whole army of robots to take over the city. His army was defeated when Walter the Wobot sabotaged the robot factory, producing robots loyal to the Judges, which destroyed the factory. The remaining robots were short-circuited when Dredd used Weather Control to make a lightning storm, and Dredd himself then hunted down Kenneth.

=== Chief Judge Cal ===
Judge Cal was an insane chief judge of Mega-City One who sentenced the entire population to death in 2101. He was the main villain of the 20-episode story The Day the Law Died in 1978–1979. His name and character were inspired by the mad Roman emperor Caligula.

Cal was deputy chief judge and head of the Special Judicial Squad (internal affairs) until he assassinated Chief Judge Goodman in 2100 or 2101. He automatically became chief judge. His first official acts were to appoint his pet goldfish deputy chief judge, and to sentence Judge Dredd to death for accusing him of murdering Goodman. Most of the other judges had been brainwashed to obey Cal, even while they knew he was mad, using advanced technology, but Dredd, Giant and a few others had escaped this fate. Giant rescued Dredd from execution, and Dredd recruited other judges to their cause, including Judge Griffin, principal of the Academy of Law. Dredd led a citizens' revolution against Cal, but it was defeated by alien mercenaries hired by Cal, called the Kleggs, man-eating crocodile-like humanoids who accepted payment in flesh.

As punishment for the revolt, Cal sentenced the entire population to death, in alphabetical order, starting with Aaron A. Aardvark. Dredd arranged for Judge Fish to be secretly assassinated, reasoning that the superstitious Cal would think it was a sign of divine disapproval; Cal called off the executions. The Klegg leader, Grampus, was appointed deputy chief judge.

It wasn't long before Cal again decided to kill the whole city, however, and this time all at once by using a weapon of mass destruction. Dredd's band of resistance fighters was much depleted by this time, and only by sabotaging and reversing Cal's brainwashing technique were they able to defeat Cal in time. Dredd was nominated to replace Cal as chief judge, but he declined, nominating Griffin instead.

=== Chopper ===
Chopper (also known as Marlon Shakespeare) is a fictional character appearing in British comics anthologies 2000 AD and Judge Dredd Megazine. He was created by John Wagner and Ron Smith (with a redesign for his Midnight Surfer persona by Cam Kennedy) and has appeared in numerous Judge Dredd stories, including "Oz", and has his own eponymous series. The concept and name comes from a fan letter to 2000 AD, which was signed "From Chopper." Wagner said, "there was something about the lad we [me and Alan Grant] liked and we put some of his character into Chopper."

Born in Mega-City One, Marlon Shakespeare is a bored and restless teenager. His father, Bert Shakespeare, enjoys head-butting eggs into a basket while his mother, Ruby, fills her hours by obsessively washing dishes. Wanting more than the mundane existence of his parents, Marlon leaves and finds infamy as "Chopper," a wall scrawler (graffiti artist) challenging authority by painting smiley faces in ambitious and public locations. Chopper becomes known as "King Scrawler" of Mega-City One but he is challenged for the title by the Phantom, a mysterious rival scrawler. After Chopper defaces the relocated white cliffs of Dover in 100 ft letters, the Phantom publicly challenges him to scrawl on the Statue of Judgement. When the two rivals meet, Chopper is shocked to learn the Phantom is a painting droid wishing to escape monotony and be somebody important. Refusing to be taken by the Judges, the Phantom plunges to its death. As Judge Dredd arrests him, Chopper wonders if all who try to escape monotony are just robots in the end.

Several years later, the now-released Chopper realizes a natural talent at being a Powerboard sky-surfer and becomes an instructor for young kids living in Tommy McArdle Block. Judge Dredd crosses paths with him again while searching for the Midnight Surfer, a masked criminal sky-surfer who evades Judges with illegal and dangerous low-flying surfing. Dredd discovers Chopper is the Midnight Surfer and had been training for the forthcoming Supersurf 7, an illegal Powerboard contest held on the streets of Mega-City One. Dredd sets up 'Spy In The Sky' cameras to track Chopper's movements but the sky-surfer spots and outmaneuvers them. In Supersurf 7, he competes against Dak Goodvibes, Johnny Cuba and world champion Yogi Yakamoto. During the final part of the race, Yakamoto falls after being clipped by a large vehicle. Seeing his idol in danger of suffering further injury, Chopper rescues Yakamoto and finishes the race with the champion in his arms. Yakamoto dies from his injuries, but declares Chopper to be "King Surfer" just before the man is again arrested by Dredd.

While Chopper is imprisoned, Supersurf contests are legalized in the Sydney-Melbourne Conurb (located in Australia) with the full backing of the Oz Judges. Local Oz sky-surfer Jug McKenzie becomes the new champion. Despite calls from the citizens of Mega-City One for Chopper to be released in time for him to challenge McKenzie in Supersurf 10, Judge Dredd refuses to bow to public opinion. Dredd moves Chopper to a maximum-security isolation cube but during this a mob rushes the Judges. Chopper escapes in the commotion. After a dangerous journey, during which he is thought to have died in a hurricane, Chopper finally arrive in Oz. He receives a hero's welcome and the Oz Judges decide to let Chopper compete rather than incite a riot. On the day of the race, Chopper's friend WipeOut Jones offers him his own Stratos 4 Powerboard to use in Supersurf 10. Dredd promises to arrest Chopper once the race is finished. "You've made fools of us too often, Shakespeare. This time, you try to escape... I'll have to kill you."

In the end, champion Jug McKenzie wins by less than an inch. As Dredd moves in, Chopper congratulates Jug, then sky-surfs away but at a moderate speed. Dredd hesitates to shoot and is struck from behind by McKenzie. Chopper escapes to the Radback (Radioactive Outback) and makes a new life in the desert. On a supply run to the city, Chopper meets new love interest Charlene and forms a friendship with McKenzie, despite being bitter over losing Supersurf 10. The two have a rematch and Chopper wins. He then returns to the Radback.

The popular story "Song of the Surfer" shows Chopper still living in the Radback and befriending Smokie, a grumpy elderly aborigine. Smokie dies soon after advising Chopper to follow his 'songline' and take part in the upcoming Supersurf 11 in Mega-City Two. Chopper reunites with Jug McKenzie and Charlene. Controversy strikes Supersurf 11 when fireworks kill several of the surfers and many believe this to be an intentionally lethal publicity stunt arranged by new sponsors, StigCorp. Stig – the blind head of StigCorp – publicly announces the route for Supersurf 11 will include snipers, missile launchers and napalm directed at competitors, more of a bloodbath than merely a race. Many surfers refuse to participate, but 16-year-old Sonny Williams from Brit-Cit signs up. Not wishing to shy away from a challenge, Chopper follows suit, as do 39 others. When a drunk Jug Mckenzie decides to join the race in response to critics saying he is now past his prime, Chopper locks him in a cupboard. Moments after the race starts, a shell burst decapitates surfer Dallas Hall, embedding part of her skull into Chopper's left arm, rendering it immobile. As the race continues, many others fall dead or injured, leaving only a handful of surfers left with Chopper in the lead. During one of the final obstacles, Chopper is gunned down by hidden machine guns. Watching the broadcast, Charlene rushes to be with her fallen lover. Chopper regains consciousness and attacks the two gunners, but not before they strike down surfer Sonny Williams. Chopper gets back on his board and heads towards Stig, who has taken a sniper position near the finish line despite his blindness. Chopper throws a grenade he took from one of the machine gunners, killing Stig and his assistant. Chopper turns his board towards the finish line but then succumbs to his wounds. He collapses onto his board inches from the finish. Charlene runs to the seemingly lifeless Chopper and the story ends.

Although "Song of the Surfer" was meant to be the final Chopper story, he later appeared in the story "Earth, Wind and Fire" in the first issue of Judge Dredd Megazine. Said to have survived his injuries, he is depicted as a retired athlete living alongside Charlene and Jug in a dropout commune in the Radback. StigCorp destroys the commune, killing WipeOut Jones. Chopper and Jug then make an almost suicidal assault on the Oz headquarters of StigCorp. Many fans were upset with the story, believing it undermined the emotional impact of the finale of "Song of the Surfer." Garth Ennis, writer of "Earth, Wind and Fire," later agreed that bringing Chopper back was a bad idea.

When Jug Mckenzie dies, Chopper meets the man's estranged daughter Mercy and her mother, Calista. Chopper returns to Mega-City One and finds himself in the centre of a con that brings him face to face once again with Judge Dredd. In the end, Chopper returns to Oz and his new job as a lifeguard. In Judge Dredd Megazine #302's "Twenty Years to Midnight", set in 2132, Chopper makes a background appearance on a talkshow but teenagers watching are unaware of who he is. A character notes Chopper looks tired and lost, nostalgic for the old days "when he used to matter."

=== The Creep ===
The Creep is an apparently immortal mutant living in the Undercity (the remains of old New York City).

He is a maniac able to morph his face and body into every terror imaginable. He takes great delight in torturing those who come from the Mega City down into the Undercity who disturb his playground of horrors. On one occasion The Creep tortures a hunting party who descend to the Undercity. An example of his bizarre behaviour was transplanting the head of one of the hunting party members onto the neck of his pet crocodile Yorkie.

During Necropolis The Creep left the Undercity and met the four Dark Judges. Judge Fire burned the Creep alive. Judge Fear stared into his face and Judge Mortis touched his flesh, all to no avail. In the end the quartet fled this invincible monster, and he has not been heard of since.

=== Vitus Dance ===
First appearance: 2000 AD #955 (1995). Created by John Wagner and Carlos Ezquerra.

Vitus Dance was a freelance assassin from the Cursed Earth. He had psionic powers, including pyrokinesis (the ability to set fires with his mind), levitation, and the power to control the minds of others. The strength of his powers was amplified by scorpion poison, and he carried two pet scorpions with him to sting him when necessary. In 2117 Dance was hired by mob boss Nero Narcos to kill an informer in judicial custody, a task which he accomplished by allowing himself to be arrested to get close enough to his victim, and then escaping. He was caught by Judges Dredd and Castillo, and served four years in solitary confinement, during which time he became insane. He escaped by faking his own death and then breaking out of the ambulance taking him to the morgue. Narcos still hoped to use him, but Dance tried to take over his mind. Narcos escaped and betrayed Dance to the Judges, who eventually killed him after many of them were slain.

=== Dark Judges ===
Judge Death, the leader of the Dark Judges, shortly after "judging" (i.e. killing) an alleged perpetrator.

The Dark Judges are "alien super-fiends", four undead judges from a parallel Earth simply called Deadworld after they killed the population. This Earth was similar to Judge Dredd's world, but with less advanced technology and less concern regarding harm and the loss of life. Judges on this world were generally corrupt and issued aggressor drugs, making them more violent while ensuring loyalty to their leaders. At some point, a young Judge named Sydney De'Ath concludes all crime is a result of sentient life having free will, therefore life itself is impure and must be considered a crime. He regularly sentences people to death, even for minor offenses, earning himself the name "Judge Death". He later gathers three younger Judges who agree with his views. In time, they are called Judge Fire, Judge Fear, and Judge Mortis. The four believe death to be the best way to ensure order and remove chaos.

Later on, Judge Death meets Phobia and Nausea, the Sisters of Death, two dark witches who seem to have similar beliefs about the purity of death. Unknown to De'Ath at the time, the Sisters are monstrous beings from another dimension who gain power by encouraging genocide, acting through agents and avatars. The Sisters offer to free Judge Death and his three followers from the sin of life by killing them and then treating their bodies with alchemic "Dead Fluids" that will make them powerful undead monsters. They agree, becoming the undead Dark Judges. Taking over their city, the group declares life itself a crime. Using Dead Fluids, they turn many into undead Grey Judges. With this new army, they exterminate their planet's human population, turning it into "Deadworld".

The Dark Judges later slay the Grey Judges after realizing they do not follow Judge Death's desire for order and seek to war with him for more power. While the three lieutenant Dark Judges are largely satisfied, Judge Death is restless and believes he must continue spreading death. After acquiring technology to travel to other dimensions, Judge Death leaves Deadworld and by chance comes to Judge Dredd's Earth in 2102. Death is defeated by Dredd and Psi-Judge Anderson, who holds the Dark Judge telepathically imprisoned within her own mind.

Realizing their leader has been captured, the other Dark Judges later come to Dredd's Earth and free him. The four unleash terror on Mega-City One before being forced back to Deadworld by Judges Dredd and Anderson. Though Anderson seems to destroy them with the residual psychic anguish of their many victims, their spirits survive. They later hypnotize and trick Anderson into returning to Deadworld and creating new undead bodies for them. Since then, the Dark Judges have repeatedly fought Anderson, Dredd, and the Judges of Mega-City One, inflicting great loss of life with each new attack.

For a time the Dark Judges are exiled to Limbo, the netherworld between dimensions. Later, the Sisters of Death on Deadworld create a psychic bridge to Earth and use it to corrupt Judge Kraken, who then utilizes dimensional travel technology to bring the Dark Judges back to Earth. The Sisters use their new power to turn Mega-City One into a twisted "Necropolis" in 2112, and the Dark Judges take over, leading to the deaths of 60 million citizens and thousands of judges. In the 2003-2004 storyline "The Wilderness Days", Judge Death uses nuclear weaponry to destroy Las Vegas and its population, deciding weapons of mass destruction may be more practical rather than killing all victims face to face.

The four Dark Judges often declare they cannot be stopped because "You cannot kill what does not live". These undead villains, although not invincible, possess supernatural power, as well as greater than human strength and resistance to injury. They can psychically influence certain minds and possess them temporarily. When a host body is destroyed, a Dark Judge's spirit is released as a gaseous form that can infect and inhabit a new host body. Once the new host body is killed and made undead, the Dark Judge's full power returns. It is possible to fight and injure the spirits of the Dark Judges telepathically or on the astral plane. It is also possible to trap the spirit of a Dark Judge before it infects a new host body, such as within special iso-cube cells or a "glasseen crystal" that can only be broken with liquid nitrogen. All four Dark Judges, most prominently Judge Death, speak with a characteristic hiss. Their signature phrase is often rendered as "The crime isss life! The sssentence isss... death!"

==== Judge Death ====
First appearance: 2000 AD #149 (1980). Created by John Wagner and Brian Bolland.

The "alien super-fiend" Judge Death is the founder and leader of the Dark Judges, and he is considered an arch-enemy to Judge Dredd and Judge Anderson. Because he cannot be permanently killed, he is the most recurring villain of the Judge Dredd stories.

According to Judge Death, he was originally born Sydney De'Ath (pronounced "Dath" since the "E" is silent), a human boy who at an early age enjoys torturing animals, even tricking the family dog Woofie into leaping to his death. His father, a traveling dentist, hates people and takes pleasure inflicting pain on patients, even killing some. After Sydney attempts and fails to kill his own sister, his father sees a kindred spirit and makes the boy his apprentice. Sydney later concludes that being a Judge would give him greater opportunity to cause death without penalty, so he turns his own father over to the authorities. Favored for his actions, Sydney is allowed to activate the electric chair that executes his father.

After honing his skills and framing a fellow trainee for his own crimes, Sydney De'Ath becomes a merciless Judge on his Earth, sentencing people to death for even minor offenses, arguing this ensures no repeat offenders. He decided to make his new nickname "Judge Death" his official name. After executing his mother and sister, he meets three like-minded, younger Judges who become his lieutenants. He later meets the two dark witches known as the Sisters of Death, learns they have similar views of life and death, and falls in love with the pair. The Sisters reveal they can make others undead through "Dead Fluids", endowing power and removing the sin of being alive. Judge Death and his lieutenants are transformed into the undead Dark Judges. Judge Death then kills his home's Chief Judge, declaring himself now in charge and proclaiming life itself is a crime and the sentence is death.

After eliminating all life on his Earth, turning it into Deadworld, the other three Dark Judges are satisfied they can rest now but Judge Death is increasingly restless. When alien explorers from another dimension appear, Death kills them and takes their dimension-hopping technology, concluding he must spread death to other Earths too. The other Dark Judges do not think this is necessary, so Death travels alone to Judge Dredd's Earth. Despite his power, he is defeated by Judge Dredd and Psi-Judge Cassandra Anderson. After his body is destroyed, his mind is telepathically imprisoned by Anderson. He is freed a year later, becoming a frequent menace to Mega-City One and Dredd while developing a particular hatred for Judge Anderson. Judge Death later remarks that he and Anderson share a telepathic link and he can never truly rest while she still lives.

Following the "Necropolis" story where the Dark Judges temporarily controlled Mega-City One, Judge Death hides, eventually renting an apartment at the Sylvia Plath block from nearly blind landlady Mrs. Gunderson, using the alias "Jay De'Ath". During this time, Death tells his life story to journalist Skuter, later killing him when the man sells a truncated version of the story to a tabloid. He then travels to the DC Comics version of Earth in Batman/Judge Dredd: Judgment on Gotham, meeting the villain Scarecrow before being defeated by Batman, Judge Dredd, and Judge Anderson. Imprisoned in Anderson's mind again, he is brought back to Dredd's Earth and his spirit is imprisoned in a special cell. Over the next several years, Death escapes a few times only to later be imprisoned once again, sometimes within a special "glasseen crystal" that can only be destroyed with liquid nitrogen.

During "The Wilderness Days" (Judge Dredd Megazine #209-216, 2003-2004), Judge Death travels under the name "Jay De'Ath" and considers the scope of his quest. He concludes he has made his task harder by killing victims face to face when weapons of mass destruction would destroy greater numbers. After destroying Las Vegas and its entire population, the Judges defeat him again.

Judge Death takes great joy in causing death and fear, but he also takes his work seriously. He sees death as a great gift he is generously giving and one which he must not fail to deliver, while those who oppose him are "ungrateful" fools who torment him and obstruct a holy cause. His favourite method of killing is to thrust his razor-sharp claws directly into the victim's chest or head. As an undead monster, he is resistant to conventional injury and possesses superhuman strength. His body can be destroyed by heavy weaponry and other methods, such as the standard incendiary ammunition of the Judges' Lawgiver pistol, at which point Judge Death's spirit will leave the corpse as a sentient gas and attempt to possess a new host. Judge Death will not have the same full supernatural power in his new host body unless the host is killed and then treated with a special process to make the body undead. In Batman/Judge Dredd: Judgment on Gotham, it is revealed that Judge Death fears and hates bright, cute, colorful things such as unicorns.

Judge Death's uniform is a twisted parody of the standard Judge uniform, replacing the helmet's visor with a portcullis, the uniform zipper with crude stitches, and the eagle ornament on the shoulder with a pterodactyl.

==== Judge Mortis ====
One of Judge Death's Dark Judges. Mortis wears no helmet and has a sheep's skull for a head. The touch of his hands brings decay. Metals (except for gold) will break down and turn to dust, while a living victim will quickly decompose, soon leaving only bare bones that crumble away. In the prequel Deadworld stories, Mortis is shown to be Death's most trusted Dark Judge and closest confidant.

==== Judge Fear ====
Judge Fear is one of the Dark Judges who serves under Judge Death. As his name states, he manipulates the fears of other people. Judge Fear wears a great helm with a visor that obscures his entire face. He often kills his victims by opening his visor and showing his horrible face to them, literally scaring the victim to death. Judge Fear's face manifests differently with each victim, and it sometimes unleashes a vision based on the victim's deepest fears.

Judge Fear's face and illusions do not always work on strong-willed or specially trained targets. When he first shows his face to Judge Dredd, telling him to "Gaze into the face of fear", the man feels momentary terror but then resists and punches Fear's face, shouting, "Gaze into the fist of Dredd!" Likewise, Judge Fear found a child on his native Earth who was not afraid of him.

==== Judge Fire ====
One of the Dark Judges who follows Judge Death. He gained the nickname "Judge Fire" for burning down an entire school with its students trapped inside, a sentence delivered because some students broke noise regulations during the day. In the final days before his transformation and the genocide he was working undercover using the alias Fuego (Spanish for fire) to infiltrate a resistance group who he inevitably betrayed and led to the newly undead Judge Death. As a Dark Judge, Judge Fire's undead body is permanently engulfed in flames and he wields a fiery trident that can create great blazes and easily pierce flesh and armour.

==== Sisters of Death ====
Two undead witch sisters called Phobia (the eldest) and Nausea (the youngest) who come from an unknown dimension and have apparently encouraged and aided planetary-scale genocide on multiple planets, their dark magic increasing in power each time. They often appear as beautiful women but are in fact monstrous beings. While trapped on Deadworld, the Sisters cannot affect Dredd's Earth unless they have a psychic bridge or some other means of access. Even then, their power is dependent on how much the target fears them. A fearful target may suffer permanent or lethal injury from the Sister's power, while someone with strong enough will can resist suffering any real effects. The two Sisters were once joined with a third Sister, acting as a powerful triad, but she left their side and has opposed them ever since. The Sisters are apparently bound by "rules" that say they cannot directly cause genocide themselves but have to rely on agents and avatars who they can influence. Along with their Third sibling, Phobia and Nausea are said to have three cousins: Dementia, Ephemera, and Pustula.

Eventually, Phobia and Nausea come to the version of Earth inhabited by Judge Death and are discovered by him, though it is possible they arranged to be discovered. Death falls in love with the Sisters (perhaps psychically influenced by them) and accepts their offer that they use alchemic "Dead Fluids" to turn him and his followers into undead creatures. With their new power, the four Dark Judges wage war across their world, aided by the Sisters. During this time, the third Sister attempts to work against them. Eventually, all life on this Earth is eliminated, leaving it a Deadworld. The Sisters have since encouraged the Dark Judges to cause more genocide on other worlds and other Earths, but usually operate in the background, remaining on Deadworld.

=== Rico Dredd ===
First appearance: 2000 AD #30 (1977). Created by Pat Mills and Mike McMahon.

Rico Dredd (2066–2099) was the "clone brother" of Joseph Dredd, which is to say that they were both cloned from the same genetic source, in their case Chief Judge Fargo. Their growth in the cloning tanks was artificially accelerated, so that within 16 months they emerged with the physical development of children aged five years. They also had their brains electronically induced with knowledge and training which greatly surpassed their apparent physical age, so that they could immediately begin training in law enforcement. Rico was removed from the cloning tanks twelve minutes before Joe, and so he habitually referred to Joe as his little brother (or "Little Joe").

At the Academy of Law, Rico consistently demonstrated higher levels of skill than Joe, and he graduated at the top of their class in 2079, with Joe coming second. During his time as a cadet, he requested to join the older cadets in restoring order to the streets of Mega-City One in the immediate aftermath of the Atomic Wars of 2070. Rico and Joe served with distinction and were personally chosen to take part in the raid on the White House to depose President Booth (who had usurped his office and had started the War).

However, following an injury during a training mission in the Cursed Earth, Rico began to become more aggressive, underhanded, and determined to prove himself better than Joe. After graduation, Rico began engaging in criminal activities, including extortion, assault and racketeering. Joe suspected that this was the result of exposure to radiation when Rico was injured on a training mission in the Cursed Earth.

When Joe witnessed Rico murder an innocent cafe owner who had refused to pay him protection money, Joe arrested him. Rico was sentenced to twenty years hard labour on the prison colony of Titan, where he grew to hate his brother. While on Titan, he illicitly fathered a daughter, Vienna, with a reporter who was interviewing him.

After serving his time on Titan, Rico returned to Mega-City One seeking revenge on Joe. Confronting him at his home, Rico challenged him to a duel to settle their differences, knowing that with his superior skills he could always outdraw his brother. However, he had grown used to the weaker gravity of Titan after his twenty years there. This slowed him down by a split second and allowed Joe to shoot him dead. Carrying his brother's lifeless body out into the street, Joe declined a paramedic's offer of assistance, allowing the writer, Pat Mills, to conclude the story with a line from the Hollies song, "He ain't heavy – he's my brother!"

Although in the original story, Rico was depicted wearing a judge's badge with the name "Dredd", some artists in later stories have erroneously drawn him with a badge labelled "Rico" as though it were his surname. This is possibly based on confusion with the character Judge Rico, whose surname is Rico and whose badge therefore bears that name.

The 1994 Judge Dredd novel Dread Dominion by Stephen Marley depicts a universe where Dredd executed Rico rather than arrest him and descended into madness. The fact that Rico's badge read "Dredd" was part of the plot. In a parallel universe, Joe shot Rico instead of arresting him. The bullet went through the second D in Rico's badge. Joe kept the badge as a souvenir, and eventually had the letter A substituted and wore it, and changed his name to Dread.

Rico Dredd appears as the main antagonist of the 1995 film Judge Dredd, where he is played by Armand Assante.

=== Judge Edgar ===
First appearance: 2000 AD #959 (1995). Created by John Wagner and John Burns.

Although in most of her stories Judge Jura Edgar is not evil or a murderer in the manner of most villains in the Judge Dredd series (though in her last story it transpires that she is responsible for a number of murders), she is nevertheless one of Dredd's adversaries. She was the head of the Public Surveillance Unit from 2100 to 2122, and then the governor of a prison farm in the Cursed Earth.

An ambitious judge, in the 2090s Edgar was part of a small group of judges that committed vigilante murders, under the alias of the Citizens' Court. By working at PSU, Edgar was able to ensure that the others were not caught. After seventeen killings, she had the group disbanded so it could not cause problems for her career advancement.

Edgar became head of PSU when she lost the use of her legs after receiving a back injury when wounded in the line of duty. She moved around using a hoverchair (anti-gravity wheelchair), and became renowned for her strict discipline and high expectations of her staff. She became PSU's longest serving head, serving twenty-two years. She occasionally used the wealth of confidential information at her disposal to play power games with other judges to increase her own influence. One notable example of this is when, to avenge herself on Judge Dredd for a perceived slight against her, she orchestrated a disciplinary investigation into Judge DeMarco – one of Dredd's associates – which led to DeMarco's resignation. Edgar's reputation for this sort of behaviour led people to compare her to the 20th century FBI director J. Edgar Hoover, and she acquired the nickname "J. Edgar Hover" (only ever used behind her back).

In 2117 she was discovered to be illicitly keeping sensitive information on other senior judges, which had been compiled by Judge Cal for the purposes of blackmail when he was head of the Special Judicial Squad, the Judges' internal affairs division. Chief Judge Volt decided to take no action against her, but when Judge Hershey succeeded him as chief judge in 2122, Hershey immediately had Edgar arrested and investigated by the SJS. On trial before the Council of Five, Edgar defended herself with skill and defiance. She briskly and brusquely discredited what had initially seemed to be overwhelming evidence, reducing the prosecution case to nothing more than empty innuendo, and claiming that the charge was politically motivated.

Besides the seniority of the defendant, Edgar's trial is also notable for being the first occasion when Judge Dredd ever sat on the Council – having always declined a permanent seat – when he agreed to sit in a vacant seat to make up the numbers for the duration of the trial.

Although Edgar was acquitted of all criminal charges, she was still dismissed from office by Chief Judge Hershey. Judge Niles, who was head of SJS and who had personally led the investigation (and brought the whole affair to Hershey's attention in the first place), was transferred from SJS to take over command of the PSU. Edgar was demoted to the lowly position of commanding Cursed Earth Correctional Facility 17, where she remained for eight years.

By 2130 she was in very ill health and on the verge of death from cancer. As part of a final scheme for revenge, she steered Dredd towards the remaining members of the Citizens Court, in the hope that Dredd would be killed by one of them resisting arrest. By the time Dredd had uncovered her involvement she had died, too late for him to arrest her for the murders.

=== Efil Drago San ===
Created by Dave Stone, Efil Drago San is a notorious and bloodthirsty crime lord. He was born on Puerto Luminae, a lunar colony that refused to buy into the Justice System and faced a heavy trade embargo as a consequence – as a result, starvation and poverty ensued and Drago San ended up developing a taste for killing. He used to operate as a crime lord in Brit-Cit, where he controlled many corrupt high-ranking Judges and developed a nemesis in Detective-Judge Armitage. Armitage crippled him, forcing him to use a hoverpod to remain mobile; in revenge, Drago San murdered the Judge's wife. Afterwards, they operated under a principle that if Armitage ever harmed Drago San, a large number of innocent people would be killed in response.

In the Big Finish 2000 AD audio dramas, Drago San fled to Mega-City One and ran afoul of Judge Dredd after setting up the ultraviolent snuff sport The Killing Zone. Following this, he fled off-world but was finally apprehended in the Boranos System by Dredd. Due to the global nature of his crimes, in the book Psykogeddon he was put on trial – but he escaped, killing Brit-Cit's Star Chamber ruling body as he went, and his whereabouts are unknown. He has operations in Brit-Cit still, run by an agent called Ms Frobisher, as shown in Megazine #269.

In the audio CDs, Drago San is voiced by Stephen Greif.

=== Grice ===
First appearance: 2000 AD #706 (1990). Created by John Wagner and Steve Dillon.

Judge Grice was a street judge who conspired to assassinate Judge Dredd in order to prevent the 2113 referendum about the future of the Justice Department. He was arrested and sentenced to 20 years in the penal colony on Titan, but two years later – in his own series, Purgatory – he escaped. He attacked Mega-City One and killed millions with a weaponised virus before Dredd killed him.

=== Hester Hyman ===
First appearance: 2000 AD #460 (1986). Created by John Wagner, Alan Grant, and John Higgins.

Hester Hyman was an ordinary wife and mother who became so despairing of life under the tyranny of the Judges that she turned to terrorism to raise publicity for the cause of democratic reform. Her death at Dredd's hands spurred many ordinary citizens to campaign for democracy.

=== Morton Judd ===
Judge Morton Judd was the genetic scientist who in 2066 created Judge Dredd from the DNA of former chief judge Fargo. Around that time, he was appointed to the Council of Five (which was then only an advisory body to the chief judge). In 2070 he proposed genetically modifying the citizen population to make them more docile; when Fargo vetoed his plan Judd attempted to assassinate Fargo, but he was arrested and sentenced to death. He was rescued by his accomplices, and fled to an unknown location, which forty years later was discovered to be Ayer's Rock in Australia, where he had built a base. There he had created an army of clones, called the Judda, with which he attempted to seize control of Mega-City One. His plot was uncovered by Judge Dredd, and Judd and most of the Judda were killed when Dredd destroyed his base with a nuclear bomb.

Some of the Judda who had attacked Mega-City One were taken prisoner; most of them were executed, but one was spared: Kraken.

=== Kraken ===
First appearance: 2000 AD #583 (1988). Created by John Wagner and Will Simpson

Kraken is originally one of Morton Judd's clone soldiers, the Judda. He is a clone of Judge Fargo, Judge Dredd's clone father, and therefore identical to Dredd, although decades younger. When Judd is defeated, the Judda are taken captive. Chief Judge Silver decides to pardon the young Kraken and groom him to replace Dredd one day rather than simply execute him, just as Dredd himself had been a worthy successor to Fargo. Kraken becomes a cadet at the Academy of Law. At first, Kraken only pretends to go along with this, but in time his allegiance shifts and he truly desires to become a Judge.

On graduating from the Academy in 2112, Kraken's final assessment is supervised by Joe Dredd himself. Despite his younger clone-brother's flawless performance, Dredd fails him, seeing a glimmer of Kraken's Judda attitude rise when the young man is angry. Dredd concludes, "a leopard can't change his spots – not this one, anyway." Immediately after the assessment, Dredd announces his retirement, as several recent experiences had shaken his faith in the justice system, and leaves the city as is tradition. Silver secretly overrules Dredd and set a final test of loyalty for Kraken. Kraken's pardon is revoked and he is sentenced to death for his Judda crimes. Despite opportunities to resist or escape, Kraken accepts his fate and administers the lethal injection himself – only to then discover it is a harmless anesthetic. Silver sees an opportunity to cover up the fact that one of the city's most famous and trusted Judges lost faith and recently left Mega-City One. After Kraken's death is faked, he makes the young man a Judge and then orders him to impersonate Dredd for the time being, giving him Dredd's badge and making sure only a few Judges know the real Dredd has left. For more than a dozen installments of the Judge Dredd series after that, the lead character of the strip was actually Kraken, wearing Dredd's badge.

Silver's plan proves to be disastrous. When the Sisters of Death create a psychic bridge to Earth as the first stage of their attack on Mega-City One, they target Dredd first, a hated enemy. Discovering that instead, they have found a younger, more vulnerable version of Dredd in Kraken, they exploit the former Judda's inner conflict and doubt, successfully brainwashing him into becoming their agent. Under the Sisters' influence, Kraken kidnaps Psi-Judge Agee so the Sisters can have a stronger psychic bridge to Earth from their home base on Deadworld. At one point, Kraken realizes he is being controlled but fears the Judges will not understand he is not to blame, and eventually falls completely under the Sisters' control. Kraken then uses dimensional travel technology to bring their brothers, the undead Dark Judges, to Earth. They take over the city, turning it into a "Necropolis" as they begin slaughtering everyone. Kraken becomes a fifth Dark Judge himself (albeit a living one). He is only freed when Dredd returns with allies to the city and banishes the Sisters of Death (see Judge Kit Agee).

Although the Judges are defeated, 60 million people have been killed. Kraken, once again in control of his faculties, submits to Dredd, understanding he deserves death. Dredd says he understands Kraken was unable to resist the Sisters and does not truly blame him for the Necropolis. Kraken thanks Dredd and peacefully accepts execution a moment later.

=== PJ Maybe ===
First appearance: 2000 AD #534 (1987). Created by John Wagner, Alan Grant, and Liam Sharp.

Philip Janet Maybe, usually known as PJ Maybe (or by various aliases), is a serial killer who has frequently been arrested by Judge Dredd, and has almost as frequently escaped arrest. He committed his first murder at age 12, in a story first published in 1987, and committed more murders as a teenager and then as an adult. He often used mind control drugs to force his victims to kill others or themselves. He changed his appearance several times and took over his victims' identities. Most notably, he killed and stole the identity of Byron Ambrose, and in that guise he was elected Mayor of Mega-City One (after killing the previous mayor and framing a rival candidate for the murder).

It was information provided by Maybe which led to the arrest of Chief Judge Sinfield for using a mind control drug to depose Chief Judge Francisco. In exchange for this, Maybe's death sentence was commuted by the re-instated Francisco to life without parole, over Dredd's objections, a decision Francisco later regretted when Maybe escaped and killed again.

Maybe's last appearance to date was a 2016 storyline about him cross-dressing to conceal his identity, ending with him finally being killed by Dredd.

=== Nero Narcos ===
Nero Narcos was the leader of the criminal syndicate called the Frendz, who was a recurring villain in late-1990s Judge Dredd stories. He was responsible for employing Vitus Dance and Orlok to assassinate a rival criminal, and instigating the Second Robot War.

In the story The Doomsday Scenario, Narcos sabotaged a new batch of upgraded lawgivers by programming them to self-destruct when used by their authorized users (once they received a radio signal, so the rogue command took effect in all weapons simultaneously). This resulted in large numbers of judges being crippled or killed at the precise moment they were attacked by Narcos's Assassinator robots at the beginning of the Second Robot War in 2121. Nero Narcos was swiftly able to conquer Mega-City One and drive the Judges underground, but once he had the city conquered he found himself unable to actually run it. After a team led by Judge Dredd, with assistance from Brit-Cit, were able to cripple his robotic army, Narcos was defeated and executed.

=== Orlok the Assassin ===
Orlok was a judge of East-Meg One, a mega-city in the former Russia. In 2103 Orlok infected Mega-City One's water supply with a substance which caused the population to become insanely violent. This was a precursor to invasion, the first stage of the Apocalypse War. Orlok was captured by Judge Dredd, but he was later rescued and he attacked the city several more times before finally being executed.

=== Chief Judge Oswin ===
Pamelina Oswin became Texas City's chief judge in 2137. When Brit Cit abandoned Mega City One and demanded Dredd's extradition over the Murphyville Spaceport massacre, Chief Judge Hershey turned to Oswin for help. She quickly arrived and brought a large number of her judges to act as reinforcements for Mega City One's diminished numbers. She quickly had her judges placed in strategic locations throughout the city (missile defence, immigration, Grand Hall security). It shortly became apparent that she did not want to help Hershey but usurp her, and then covertly take full control of the city. Her plan was to rebuild America in her own image, where mutants would be persecuted even more, if not completely wiped out (her rallying cry was even "The South shall rise again"). Her plans were foiled when Dredd escaped from Brit Cit and, with the help of some loyal judges, was able to storm the Hall of Justice and kill her.

Oswin's Council of Five later disowned her, claiming that they had no idea what she had really been doing. Hershey and Dredd did not believe this but there was little they could do about it militarily. However Hershey was able to blackmail and force the Texans into making one of her own judges their new chief judge.

Oswin's story was told in a story arc composed of five stories and collectively known as "Every Empire Falls" in 2000 AD #1973–1990 and Judge Dredd Megazine #371–374 (2016), written by Michael Carroll.

=== Raptaur ===
The Raptaur is a deadly species of alien. They can dismember people in seconds with razor-sharp claws, and their preferred food is human brains. They can create a psi-fog at will and also secrete a toxin which saps the will to live and encourages their prey to submit without resistance; several Raptaurs were "milked" for this toxin to create a drug. Dredd encountered and eventually killed one in 2113. Jack Point has owned two as pets (Cliq and Larf), and describes them as "harder than a diamond on PCP" and being more dangerous than the xenomorphs Mr Bones found.

=== Sabbat the Necromagus ===
Sabbat was the villain in the story "Judgement Day". A native to the future time period of Strontium Dog, Sabbat was originally a boy named Soppi Walters, a native of Osborne's World. After being bullied, he was befriended by a friendly witch but then killed her and used her resources to study dark magic. His first act of necromancy was to kill and reanimate a boy who bullied him, creating an undead servant. As an adult, he studies more under the necromancer Murd the Oppressor and takes the name Sabbat. At some point, he apparently dies and then resurrects himself so that he can regenerate from nearly any damage. Obsessed with power and taking intense joy in causing death and proving his power, Sabbat decides to create a zombie army to conquer the galaxy. He begins by wiping out the population of the planet Bethsheba. Authorities realize his actions and use nuclear weaponry to vaporize Sabbat's new army from orbit. Sabbat then uses time travel technology to leave 2178 and journey back to 2114 where no one is familiar with him and where local authorities will be more vulnerable due to more primitive technology and his own knowledge of history.

Making his base in the Radlands of Ji (an area of China), Sabbat uses a mystical lodestone to tap into the power of Earth's own energy field. With this, he is able to raise armies of the dead all across the planet, sending them against all the Mega-Cities simultaneously, starting the Fourth World War. He is able to bring down five cities: Brasilia, Djakarta, Mega-City Two, Sino-Cit, and South-Am City. This results in roughly three billion lives lost. Rather than allow those dead to become new zombies under Sabbat's control, the Judges (under Dredd's suggestion) drop nuclear weapons on all five cities, knowing that any survivors will be vaporized alongside the walking dead or will soon die from the fallout. Eventually, despite his efforts, Sabbat is stopped by Judge Dredd, the time-traveling bounty hunter Johnny Alpha, and Judge Sadu of Hondo City. Sadu sacrifices himself on the lodestone, disrupting some of Sabbat's power in the process and giving Dredd and Alpha the opportunity to decapitate him. Though he survives decapitation, his head is then speared onto the top of his own lodestone, preventing him from being able to escape or regenerate. Unable to use his power now, Sabbat's undead armies fall, and Dredd and Alpha leave him to spend eternity alone. It is later revealed that he is reduced to a near catatonic state only months later, his mind shattered by his experiences.

=== Jacob Sardini ===
Jacob Sardini was a taxidermist who stuffed dead human bodies. Among those he stuffed were the Yess family. In 2109 he had an encounter with Judge Dredd when he was forced to stuff the bodies of some gangsters who had been shot in a mob war, and then had to secretly dispose of the bodies when his client was killed by the Judges.

Several years later, he represented Mega-City One in the 2116 Nepal Olympics, where he won the gold medal in the taxidermy event. He is one of the very, very few criminals in the comic strip to escape detection by Judge Dredd. He died of a heart attack in 2120 after being robbed.

=== Sinfield ===
Judge Martin Sinfield orchestrated the removal of Chief Judge Hershey from office in a recall election, replacing her with Judge Dan Francisco. Francisco appointed Sinfield deputy chief judge, in which capacity Sinfield posted Judge Dredd to an assignment in the Cursed Earth. Sinfield then drugged Francisco with a mind-control drug and ordered him to resign. Sinfield's coup was eventually discovered by Judges Dredd, Logan and Buell, and he was deposed by the Council of Five and sentenced to 20 years' hard labour in the prison on Titan.

After a mass breakout from Titan eventually resulted in the deaths of almost all concerned, Sinfield was the sole survivor. He was captured by East-Meg Two for interrogation, and rescued by Dredd. He remains in the custody of Mega-City One.

=== Spikes Harvey Rotten ===
There have been two characters with this name:

- The first was a biker who was killed in Mega-City One while attempting to win an illegal race. He was not a noteworthy character.
- The second was created by Pat Mills as a sidekick for Dredd in the 1978 story The Cursed Earth. He was also a biker and a criminal. Dredd had him paroled from custody to accompany him on his perilous mission across the Cursed Earth desert, as he was familiar with the territory from his days smuggling guns there. When all of the judges who accompanied Dredd were killed along the way, Spikes still fought by Dredd's side. He was killed only a short distance from Mega-City Two.

=== Whitey ===
Randolph Whitely, also known as "Whitey", was the first perp to appear in the Judge Dredd strip, in 2000 AD prog 2. He murdered the first judge to appear in the strip, Judge Alvin, prompting Dredd to arrest him and sentence him to life on Devil's Island: a prison with no need for walls as it is located on a traffic island where the traffic never stops and attempting to cross the road means certain death.

Whitey was the first Judge Dredd villain to return in a sequel, when he escaped in #31. He also returned in the comic's tenth anniversary issue, #520. Dredd (at first having forgotten who Whitey was) killed him in his last appearance.

Whitey had a brother, who tried to rescue him, destroying the World Trade Center in the process (this story was published in 1977).

Whitey also had a son, who tried to avenge his father 40 years after his arrest, but Dredd killed him. This story, "Forty Years of Hurt," appeared in 2000 AD's Free Comic Book Day issue in 2017.

== Others ==
=== Blondel Dupre ===
Blondel Dupré was one of the leaders of the movement for restoring democracy in Mega-City One. She led the Democratic March of 2109 and the 2113 referendum campaign. After the first, she was arrested and was only released by Dredd in 2112 due to his crisis of faith over the methods he had used.

While Blondel campaigned against the Judges, she had developed some respect for Dredd after he had let her out and instigated a referendum on democracy. She also began to lose faith as a result of her struggle, wondering if she could succeed. When the vote was lost, she was convinced by Dredd that it was not a fix and was forced in public to tell him "you are the law" in front of her followers. She retired after losing the vote, no longer believing in the cause.

=== Fargo Clan ===
The Fargo Clan are a family of mutants in the Cursed Earth, led by Randy Fargo. They are descended from Ephram Fargo, the brother of Eustace Fargo, Dredd's clone father, and so can be considered distant relatives. Dredd was unaware of their existence until a chance encounter with them in the Cursed Earth in 2129, when they helped Dredd in an investigation. When they tried to visit Dredd in Mega-City One later that year, Dredd was forced to turn them away due to the city's strict anti-mutant laws. These experiences changed Dredd's hardline anti-mutant views, and led to him securing the repeal of the anti-mutant laws in 2130. Later that year, the Fargos were invited back to the city as guests of honour. During a tour of the city, Jubal Fargo was accidentally killed while saving the life of a young child. The family returned to their abode in the Cursed Earth.

=== Joe Fargo ===
First appearance: Judge Dredd Megazine #473 (2024). Created by Ken Niemand and Dan Cornwell.

Joe Fargo is a pseudonym adopted by another Joe Dredd from a parallel universe, who in 2146 arrived in unexplained circumstances. His version of Mega-City One abolished street judges after the tyrannical reign of Chief Judge Cal, after which this version of Dredd became a police officer. He eventually retired, married, and changed his appearance. After arriving in another timeline, he was given a small pension, a new name, and a private investigator's licence.

=== Mrs Gunderson ===
Mrs Gunderson is an elderly, partially deaf and almost blind woman who mainly appears to provide comic relief pertaining to her misinterpretations of her surroundings. "Young Death", the story of Judge Death's origin, introduces her. A couple of months after his defeat during Necropolis, the undead monster Judge Death decides to hide for a time in Room 133B of Sylvia Plath block, which he rents from Mrs Gunderson. He uses the name "Jay De'Ath" and she believes he is simply a polite, soft-spoken, thin tenant. While he kills another tenant of hers, Death does not kill Mrs Gunderrson, considering her to be the only truly innocent soul he has ever met. She only learns De'Ath's true nature after he leaves behind his apartment and challenges the Judges once more. Later on, Dredd's former companion Walter the Wobot serves as her house robot as a community service punishment for his own crimes.

Mrs Gunderson appears as a character in the Big Finish Productions audio drama Judge Dredd: Death Trap. The story takes place in 2124 on the 12th anniversary of the Necropolis affair, nearly twelve years after Judge Death lived in Sylvia Plath block. Mrs Gunderson is voiced by actor Liza Ross.

=== Max Normal ===
Max Normal was, for a while, Judge Dredd's best informant. In a city teeming with citizens dressed in unusual, eccentric or downright bizarre fashions, Max stood out for dressing conservatively in clothes which in the mid-20th century would have been perfectly normal: a pinstripe suit and a bowler hat, an umbrella, and a carnation in his buttonhole. In contrast to his looks, Max spoke in futuristic 'streetwise' slang and had many bizarre habits and affections. In Max's first appearance, Dredd expresses disgust at Max not dressing in "decent wild clothes" like everyone else and asks "why do you young people always have to be different?"

He had refined tastes, eschewing water and only ever drinking "shampagne" (real champagne being illegal): this saved him from being affected by the Block Mania contagion which infected the city's water supply in 2104. His one concession to 22nd-century living was his fondness for playing shuggy, an advanced version of billiards played on an uneven surface of hills and valleys. He stopped working for Dredd after criminals held him hostage in an attempt on Dredd's life. Years later, he was used again as a hostage in an attempt on Dredd's life, this time by the Fighting Heart Kwoon.

Normal has appeared outside the Judge Dredd series. He had his own title in the Judge Dredd Annuals from 1981 to 1984 and again in 1987 (all but the first and last collected in 2000 AD Extreme Edition #22), in the 2014 "Xmas Mega Special" edition of 2000AD (nominally numbered as issue 2015) and once appeared in Middenface McNulty's eponymous series. He made several appearances, once again providing Dredd with information, in Big Finish Productions's 2000AD audio dramas; he was voiced by Toby Longworth. He had his own series in 2000AD progs 2124–2134 in 2019.

He was the model for the character of the businessman that appeared in the Doctor Who episode "Gridlock". Max Normal was also the inspiration for rapper Watkin Tudor Jones' be-suited caricature in MaxNormal.TV, who performed in the guise of a motivational speaker at business presentations.

=== Yassa Povey ===
Yassa was the main supporting character and narrator in the Judge Dredd spin-off series The Dead Man (1990). He was a child who lived in Bubbletown in the Cursed Earth. He discovered the amnesiac "Dead Man" (the lead character) injured and near death in the desert, and helped him discover his identity. During the Necropolis incident, his eyes were burned out by the Sisters of Death; as a thank-you for his assistance, Dredd personally arranged for Yassa to come to Mega-City One to receive bionic eyes, along with counselling from Psi-Judge Anderson to ease the psychic trauma that Phobia and Nausea caused him.

=== Satanus ===
Satanus was a cloned Tyrannosaurus rex who attacked Dredd in "The Cursed Earth". Although Dredd believed Satanus to have been killed, he actually survived. He has since appeared in non-Dredd stories such as Nemesis the Warlock, introduced in Book V: "The Vengeance of Thoth".

=== Devlin Waugh ===
Devlin Waugh is a British exorcist and assassin who works for the Vatican. He is the first homosexual lead character to appear in British comics. In his first story (1992) he became a vampire, and in a later story he acquired the ability to endure sunlight. He mainly appears in his own series, but has occasionally been a supporting character in Judge Dredd. He was created by writer John Smith and artist Sean Phillips for the Judge Dredd Megazine.

In the audio drama Grud is Dead, he was voiced by Peter Guinness.
