= Origins (Judge Dredd story) =

2006–2007 comic book storyline

- Cover of 2000 AD prog. 1505 (Sept 13 2006), art by Brian Bolland. Issue containing the first episode of "Origins."
- Publisher: Rebellion Developments
- Publication date: 13 September, 2006 – 2 May, 2007
- Genre: Science fiction
- Title(s): 2000AD progs 1505-1519, 1529-1535
- Main character(s): Judge Dredd; Judge Fargo

Creative team
- Writer: John Wagner
- Artist: Carlos Ezquerra
- Editor: Tharg (Matt Smith)
- Origins: ISBN 1-905437-23-4

"Origins" is one of the longest Judge Dredd storylines to run in the pages of British comic 2000 AD. Making extensive use of flashbacks, it tells the story of how the Judges of Mega-City One rose to power. It was written by John Wagner and illustrated by Carlos Ezquerra, who between them created Judge Dredd in 1977. The story ran to 23 episodes and was published from 2006 to 2007 to mark thirty years of the Judge Dredd strip. It is set in 2129, Dredd's debut story having been set in 2099.

Wagner explained:

There were many unresolved questions about the origins of the Judge system and some apparent contradictions that required sorting out... It's a task I'd always shied away from because of the difficulty of making sense of it all while still telling a story that was worth reading – but I knew that sometime it had to be done, if for no other reason than my own satisfaction.

2000 AD editor Matt Smith has expanded on this to touch on the contents:

John has always been waiting for the right story to come along to tell Dredd's origins... And in this case he's come up with a riveting plot that will keep readers intrigued and excited, as well as filling in some of the backstory that we've never seen before – President Robert Booth's initiation of the Atomic Wars, Chief Judge Fargo taking control of Mega-City, etc. The fact the story comes just as 2000AD is approaching its 30th year anniversary gives it a nice sense of history too.

== Publication history ==
"Origins" was preceded by a five-episode story called "The Connection", written by John Wagner and drawn by Kev Walker. It appeared in progs (issues) 1500–1504 and was immediately followed by "Origins" in progs 1505–1519 and 1529–1535. It had been intended that the final episode would appear in the comic's celebratory thirtieth anniversary issue, but publication was interrupted because artist Carlos Ezquerra moved house during his work on the story. The editor decided to permit him time to finish the strip himself rather than replace him with another artist.

== Plot summary ==
=== "The Connection" ===
The prologue story introduces a team of mutants from the radioactive Cursed Earth desert outside Mega-City One, who infiltrate the city. Working for an unseen character called Linus, their task is to deliver a small box to the Grand Hall of Justice in the centre of the city. They are all killed by Judge Dredd while accomplishing this task, but Dredd fails to retrieve the box. The contents of the box are not revealed until the first episode of "Origins."

Meanwhile, Dredd, between his efforts to catch the mutants, has recurring dreams about his clone father, Chief Judge Fargo, and his brother, Rico Dredd (both long deceased). The dreams hint about the epic story to follow.

=== "Origins" ===
==== Premise ====
The box is delivered to Chief Judge Hershey, who informs Dredd that it contains a ransom note and a sample of living tissue which matches the DNA of Judge Fargo, the first chief judge and the revered founder of the Judge System. (Forensic tests establish that toxins in the tissue show that the source lived through the last century, and so the sample must be Fargo's rather than Dredd's.) The note requires payment of a billion credits in exchange for Fargo's body. As required by the terms of the exchange, Dredd leads a small, lightly armed party on a mission across the hostile Cursed Earth to retrieve their esteemed "Father of Justice."

Since Fargo was believed to have died in the year 2051, and the mission takes place in 2129, much of the story consists of Dredd explaining to the members of his team how it is that Fargo might still be alive – a secret history which was concealed from the public for decades.

==== Flashbacks ====
Chief Judge Fargo (painted by Carlos Ezquerra)

The middle chapters of "Origins" cover Fargo's life history, and how he founded his Judge System in 2031. After serving twenty years as chief judge, however, Fargo succumbed to a moment of weakness and had an illicit affair with a female colleague, something strictly forbidden by the Judges' code of celibacy. Unable to cope with his own lapse in the exacting moral standards he had inflexibly demanded of his subordinates, Fargo tendered his resignation to the President of the United States. Spurning the entreaties of his two deputies, Judge Solomon and Judge Goodman, and of President Pierce, to reconsider his decision and resume his office, Fargo instead chose to commit suicide. However his attempt to take his own life failed, leaving him with significant brain-damage and without the use of his legs.

Fearing that their political enemies would use the scandalous circumstances of Fargo's resignation and injuries to destroy Fargo's legacy, Solomon and Goodman covered them up. Using sophisticated video technology, they faked footage of Fargo bravely sacrificing his life in the line of duty, gunned down in a brutal drive-by shooting. This enabled them to present Fargo as a martyr, increasing public support for the Judges.

Chief Judge Solomon (painted by Carlos Ezquerra)

This deception had been conceived while Fargo's doctors had predicted that he would not survive long. However Fargo defied their expectations and began to slowly recover. He was therefore kept in a secret medical facility, isolated from the world so that the cover-up would not be discovered. When his condition began to deteriorate again, Chief Judge Solomon had him cryogenically frozen in suspended animation until such time as medical science could cure him.

By 2070 President Robert Linus Booth was in the White House, having illegally rigged the voting computers to win the 2068 presidential election, and murdered one of his aides who threatened to expose the fraud. Booth pursued an aggressive foreign policy, openly stating that he would begin a nuclear war if the rest of the world did not comply with his demands. The Judges – now led by Chief Judge Goodman – attempted to dissuade him, but to no avail, and the Third World War laid waste to most of the world. Booth had believed that his new "nuclear screens" would protect America from retaliation, but only Mega-City One on the east coast, Mega-City Two on the west coast, and Texas City survived. The rest of America was virtually annihilated, creating the Cursed Earth which became populated by mutants and outlaws.

Chief Judge Goodman (painted by Carlos Ezquerra)

Consequently, another of Booth's aides turned against him and provided Goodman with evidence of Booth's earlier crimes. Goodman made the evidence public, and public opinion turned against Booth. A demonstration outside the White House became a massacre when troops opened fire on the crowd. But the evidence of election fraud was not conclusive, and impeachment proceedings against Booth were too slow for Goodman to protect his position, for Booth had discovered that Fargo was alive and had been revived from suspended animation. Booth sent troops to arrest Fargo, intending to expose the myth of his death and thereby destroy the Judges' reputation for integrity.

Joe and Rico Dredd, cadets at the time, managed to rescue Fargo from capture. However Goodman realised that urgent action was needed to defeat Booth, and the constitutional mechanism for trying him and removing him from office could not be completed in time. On Fargo's advice, Goodman deposed Booth, suspended Congress, and usurped the government of the United States. For his crimes Booth was sentenced to 100 years in suspended animation, to let posterity decide his ultimate fate. Goodman became dictator of the United States (which soon split into three sovereign city-states), with Fargo – his existence still a secret – advising him from behind the scenes.

However Fargo soon deteriorated again. He also became demoralised, having intended that the overthrow of democratic government should be temporary, and regretting his own part in establishing a lasting dictatorship. Shortly after surviving an assassination attempt by renegade judge Morton Judd, Fargo was returned to suspended animation once more. However, only one month later Fargo's body was stolen by Judd's agents. When Judd was eventually brought to justice and Fargo's body was still not recovered, it was thought lost forever.

==== Conclusion ====
Thirty years later Booth's cryogenic machinery failed, and he was inadvertently revived. Judge Dredd resentenced him to life working on a farm in the Cursed Earth, to make amends for the destruction he unleashed on America. (This was first portrayed in the 1978 story "The Cursed Earth".)

Instead however Booth raised an army of mutants, the "New Mutant Army," who he intended to use to overthrow the Judges and become president again. By 2129 he had discovered Fargo's stolen cryogenic unit, which had been lost in the Cursed Earth when Judd's agents' hovership crashed. When Dredd attempted to exchange the ransom for Fargo, Booth double-crossed him and put him on trial for treason, intending to execute him. However Dredd had anticipated this and planned a timely rescue by his comrades. Taken hostage for use as a human shield, Booth was killed by his own side during the ensuing battle.

Back in Mega-City One, Fargo was revived again, but this time he did not survive. His final words were spoken to Dredd alone: "We created a monster ... we're the monster!" He told Dredd that the Judges had gone too far and had destroyed America, and urged Dredd to do everything he could to undo it.

Dredd's reaction to this plea was not shown, but when Chief Judge Hershey asked him what Fargo's last words had been, Dredd lied and pretended that Fargo had said something else less controversial. Fans speculated at the time that this indicated that this theme may be followed up in later stories. This speculation was soon proved correct.

=== Epilogue ===
"Origins" was soon followed up in a series of stories, starting with "Mutants in Mega-City One", written by John Wagner. In the first episode Dredd admitted to Hershey that he had lied about Fargo's last words. Hershey in turn admitted that Fargo had said the same thing to her, and that she had told the same lie to Dredd. However whereas Dredd took Fargo's warning seriously, Hershey dismissed it as the ravings of a brain-damaged invalid, adding that she hoped Dredd would not consider resigning over their differences.

This story also featured the return of some of the mutant Fargo Clan (who were first seen, briefly, in "Origins") – mutant descendants of Fargo, and therefore Dredd's relatives. In this story, Dredd put forward a motion to repeal the anti-mutant laws, beginning a new story arc about mutants.

== Supporting characters ==
"Origins" introduced some new characters, Dredd's cousin Randy Fargo and his family, a clan of mutants living in the Cursed Earth, who returned to the strip in the sequel "Mutants in Mega-City One."

In addition to the judges who appeared in the flashback episodes described above, the following characters appeared in the story in the "present day" of 2129, as members of Dredd's team:

- Judge Logan
- Judge Renga
- Judge Sanchez

== Collected editions ==
Both stories were released as a trade paperback in 2007, with a cover by Brian Bolland (ISBN 1-905437-23-4), and in a volume in the series "Judge Dredd: The Mega Collection" by Hachette Partworks in 2015.

Preceded by The Doomsday Scenario	Major Judge Dredd stories 2006–07	Succeeded by Mutants in Mega-City One and Tour of Duty
