= The Cursed Earth (Judge Dredd story) =

Judge Dredd comic storyline

- Cover of Judge Dredd: The Cursed Earth (2003), trade paperback collected edition
- Publisher: IPC Magazines
- Publication date: May – October 1978
- Genre: Science fiction
- Title(s): 2000 AD #61-85
- Main character: Judge Dredd

Creative team
- Writer(s): Pat Mills; John Wagner; Chris Lowder (as Jack Adrian)
- Artist(s): Mike McMahon; Brian Bolland
- Letterer: Tom Frame
- Editor(s): Tharg (Kelvin Gosnell and Steve MacManus)
- The Cursed Earth: ISBN 1-84023-459-8
- Judge Dredd: The Complete Case Files 02: ISBN 1-904265-83-9

"The Cursed Earth" is the second extended storyline of the British science fictional comics character Judge Dredd. It appeared in 2000 AD, and was the first Dredd storyline to exceed twenty episodes. Written mostly by Pat Mills, this story arc added many core setting and backstory elements to Dredd's world, particularly to locations outside Mega-City One.

== Publication history ==
The storyline ran from 2000 AD #61 to 85 (May to October 1978), and according to Kevin O'Neill was inspired by Roger Zelazny's novel Damnation Alley.

== Plot ==
In the year 2100, Mega-City Two, on the West Coast of North America, becomes infected with the virus 2T(fru)T (a play on tutti frutti), which drives people violently insane before a painful death. Scientists in Mega-City One manage to develop a vaccine, but authorities find it impossible to safely land at Mega-City Two's airports. The only option is to send a land expedition of Judges across the "Cursed Earth"–the remnant of Middle America that multiple nuclear (and conventional) wars have reduced to a barren wasteland.

As one of Mega-City One's most active and celebrated lawmen, Judge Dredd is assigned to lead the mission, equipped with a heavily armed "Killdozer" battle-tank and two state-of-the-art "Quasar" motorbikes. Accompanying him are three other Judges, a convoy of androids, and–at Dredd's own insistence–Spikes Harvey Rotten, a violent and unrepentant outlaw who is nevertheless the best motorcyclist in the nation. Though despising Dredd and all he stands for, Spikes accepts the mission from a combination of physical "persuasion" and the promise of a full pardon for his criminal record.

The bulk of the story is episodic, detailing the many savage–and bizarre–perils Dredd's party encounters along the Cursed Earth, among them:

- The "Death Belt"–an unpredictable air current that periodically flings swarms of huge, mutated rats at human settlements.
- A clan of mutants in the Appalachians (which now also contain Mount Rushmore), who have sworn violent revenge on all "normies".
- A trio of "vampires"–ultimately revealed to be medical robots preserving the suspended body of President Robert L. Booth, the last president of the United States (and instigator of the wars that created the Cursed Earth).
- A set of Mississippi plantations using enslaved extraterrestrials, which Dredd's party ultimately liberate–in the process gaining an aardvark-like alien named Tweak as a new companion.
- A region of Kansas where the local McDonald's and Burger King franchises have mutated into fiefdoms, routinely waging gang wars over new "customers".
- A mountain range (implicitly the Rockies) infested by the cloned dinosaurs that once populated a defunct amusement park–chief among them a particularly oversized and vicious Tyrannosaurus named Satanus.
- An agricultural laboratory in Utah where the sole remaining scientist (a caricature of Colonel Sanders) has created an army of creatures based on various corporate mascots, such as the Green Giant and the Michelin Man.
- The "Judges" of Las Vegas, now completely corrupted by the Mafia and running the entire city on literal life-and-death gambles.

After fourteen days (and many deaths), Dredd's party reaches Death Valley, where Tweak reveals that he is not only sapient and fully capable of human speech, but the leader of his home planet. This planet, rich in diamonds and other valuable minerals, had been discovered by human astronauts many years ago; through their innate precognitive abilities, Tweak and his fellows had determined that any human interest in the planet would mean exploitation and disaster, and resolved to hide themselves. When a fluke allowed the astronauts to capture Tweak's own children and mate, Tweak surrendered himself, all the time pretending to be an unintelligent animal to minimize their interest; while this successfully saved his planet from further human contact, it resulted in his family being sold into slavery, and ultimately being killed.

While sympathetic, Dredd is also suspicious of Tweak's motives in relating all this; privately, Tweak explains that he trusts in Dredd's integrity, while foreseeing that Spikes (who has eagerly contracted himself Tweak's "agent", owning half of his planet's resources) will not live much longer. This prediction quickly proves correct, as Death Valley holds the greatest peril of all: the remnants of President Booth's robot armies, badly decayed but still heavily armed, and programmed to kill any and all Judges. Under the robots' onslaught, the last of the assisting Judges psychologically breaks, and "surrenders" himself to be killed; subsequently, Dredd, Spikes, and Tweak barricade themselves in a nearby Spanish fortress, just barely staving off further attacks.

Eventually, the robots' commander voices a parley: as long as Dredd dies, the non-Judges are free to go. Though Dredd is willing to sacrifice himself to ensure the vaccine will reach Mega-City Two, both Tweak and Spikes refuse to abandon him. Soon after, Spikes is dealt a fatal wound, and–encouraged by Tweak's accounts of his planet's riches–uses his last strength on a suicide attack against the robots, proudly dying as "the world's first punk billionaire". Meanwhile, Dredd unloads the vaccine from the Killdozer, then dresses Spikes' corpse in a spare Judge uniform to serve as a decoy of himself; "Judge Spikes", placed on a Quasar bike, is used to lure the remaining robots to the Kill-Dozer, which has been set to self-destruct.

After the exploding tank destroys the robots, Dredd and Tweak carry the vaccine through the rest of the Mojave Desert on foot. Though a sandstorm quickly separates them, each manages to reach Mega-City Two, just barely alive. Uninfected authorities soon receive and reproduce the vaccine, bringing the plague under control in a matter of weeks, while also recuperating Dredd from his many injuries and exhaustions.

Once recovered, Dredd extols Tweak's heroism, only for the alien to beg that it be kept secret, lest humanity discover his intelligence and reexamine his planet. Reluctantly, Dredd concedes that Tweak is right to fear his planet being exploited by human greed and callousness, and returns him to his planet–as an "animal"–via freight-ship.

== Controversy ==
The Cursed Earth sparked a lawsuit against the publishers of 2000 AD from McDonald's, Burger King, and Green Giant, which took offense to the unlicensed and largely undisguised use of their Trademarked mascots (especially as one scene featured Ronald McDonald executing an "employee" for spilling a milkshake). These uses occurred in four specific episodes, written by John Wagner and Chris Lowder. Publishers IPC settled out of court, publishing a half-page retraction and agreeing never to reprint the offending episodes. Due to the stipulation that they never be reprinted, the offending issues became very valuable on the collectors market.

In 2014 the law was changed to implement a European directive on copyright law allowing the use of copyright-protected characters for parody. As a result, the suppressed episodes were published as Judge Dredd: The Cursed Earth Uncensored in July 2016.

== Collected editions ==
The series has been reprinted in many trade paperbacks. However, due to the lawsuit, these omitted the "Burger Wars" (episodes 11-12) and "Soul Food" (episodes 17-18) from the full 25-episode run until 2016. In 2016, the complete version with the reinstated episodes was published by Rebellion as "The Cursed Earth Uncensored".

Reprints include:

- Judge Dredd Epics: The Collected Cursed Earth (Titan, paperback, 1994, ISBN 1-85286-406-0)
- Judge Dredd Epics: The Cursed Earth (Titan, hardback, 2000, ISBN 1-84023-459-8)
- Judge Dredd The Complete Case Files 02 (Rebellion Developments, paperback, 2006, ISBN 1-904265-83-9)
- Judge Dredd: The Cursed Earth Uncensored (Rebellion, hardback, 2016, ISBN 1-781084-44-0)
- Judge Dredd: The Cursed Earth Uncensored (Rebellion, paperback, 2017, ISBN 1-781085-69-2

== Toys ==
The K2001 Landraider and Killdozer two-part vehicle used by Judge Dredd and his team was based on the K-2001 Raider Command Matchbox toy from the Adventure 2000 range. During the Cursed Earth story, the Matchbox toy was offered as a competition prize in the comic.

== Other story ==
Another Judge Dredd story also called The Cursed Earth appeared in The Daily Star between 4 February and 4 May 1988. It had an entirely different plot, and featured the return of Henry Ford, a supporting character who had first appeared in The Black Plague in 2000 AD issues 140–143 (1979).

== In popular culture ==
- Irish rock band Cursed Murphy Versus the Resistance released a song called "The Cursed Earth" inspired by the Judge Dredd story.

== Sources ==
- The Cursed Earth at the Comic Book DB (archived from the original)

Preceded by The Robot Wars	Major Judge Dredd stories 1978	Succeeded by The Day the Law Died!
