= Dirty Frank =

Dirty Frank may refer to:

- "Dirty Frank", a song from Pearl Jam released on the UK/German version of their album Ten
- Dirty Frank (comics), a 2000 AD character
