= Necronaut =

Necronaut is a term derived from the Greek words nekros (νεκρός), meaning "corpse" or "dead", and nautes (ναύτης), meaning "sailor". It may refer to:

- A member of the International Necronautical Society.
- A character template for a Euthanatos mage in the role-playing game Mage: The Ascension.
- Necronauts, a 2000 AD comic strip, created by Gordon Rennie and Frazer Irving.
