= City block (disambiguation) =

City block may refer to:

- City block, an area of a city surrounded by streets
- City Block (Judge Dredd), a part of the fictional universe recounted in the Judge Dredd comix
- Taxicab geometry or city block distance, a special case of the Minkowski distance
