= Frazer Irving =

British comic book artist (born 1970)

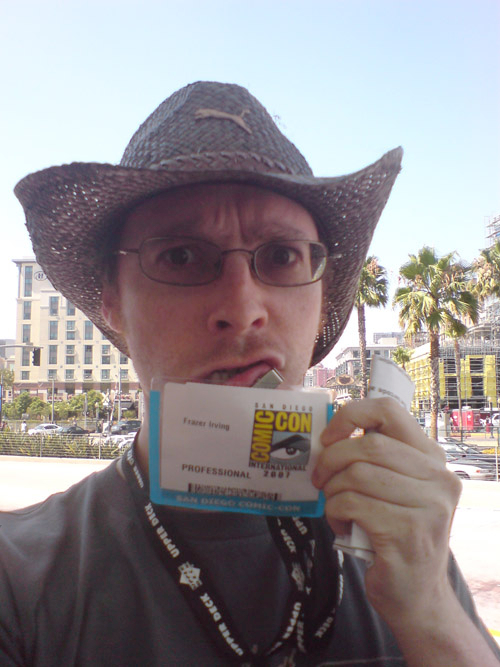
- Born: Frazer Alex Irving; 1970 (age 55–56) Ilford, Essex, England
- Areas: Penciller, Inker, Colorist
- Notable works: Necronauts; Judge Death; The Simping Detective; Silent War; Seven Soldiers: Klarion the Witch Boy
- Awards: National Comics Award, 2001, 2002; Diamond Comics Award 2002, 2004

Frazer Irving (born 1970) is a British comic book artist known for the series Necronauts, published by the British magazine 2000 AD. After breaking into the American market he has worked on a number of superhero titles, including a series of collaborations with Grant Morrison.

== Career ==
A native of Ilford, Essex, Irving studied art at the University of Portsmouth, England, after which he took various temporary jobs in London.

He worked on Storming Heaven, a psychedelic tale based around Timothy Leary and Charles Manson (written by Gordon Rennie), and The Simping Detective and From Grace written by Simon Spurrier.

He has done illustration work for RPG companies like Wizards of the Coast, Hogshead Publishing and Guardians of Order, as well as small press publications like The End Is Nigh. He also does animations on Flash for advertising agencies.

Irving's style owes something to the art of Bernie Wrightson, but with a computer-driven edge. His work on Seven Soldiers: Klarion the Witch Boy was commented on by writer Grant Morrison as follows:

"I've loved his work since I first saw it in 2000 AD and it's great to see him develop a following in US comics. I've wanted to work with Frazer for a long time. He's a truly unique artist and the work he's doing on Klarion is mind-blowing. He's doing all the color work himself and has one of the most amazing senses of design and storytelling I've ever come across."

This led to further work for both Marvel and DC Comics, including the Iron Man: The Inevitable mini-series written by Joe Casey, and Silent War, a six-issue mini-series featuring the Inhumans, written by David Hine. As part of the Battle for the Cowl storyline he provided the art for the Azrael mini-series written by Fabian Nicieza.

Irving is responsible for the artwork on the Tertiary, Quandary and Quintessential phase CD release of The Hitchhiker's Guide to the Galaxy radio series adaptation.

He also provided the art on an arc of Grant Morrison's Batman & Robin series for DC Comics, which was initially announced as following Philip Tan's arc, but was the pushed back to after Cameron Stewart's run on the series and was finally confirmed to be in the issues after Andy Clarke's stint, starting with No. 13, in addition to drawing the second issue of The Return of Bruce Wayne. Other projects include the X-Men one-shot which was part of Brian Reed's Timestorm 2009-2099, the first and last issues of Phil Hester's Days Missing for Archaia Studios, and the new Xombi series for DC Comics.

== Bibliography ==
Interior comic work includes:

- 2000 AD (anthology, Fleetway/Rebellion):
  - Tharg's Future Shocks (with Steve Moore, in #1205 and 1209, 2000)
  - Judge Dredd: "The Island" (with John Wagner, in #1206, 2000)
  - Necronauts (with Gordon Rennie, in Prog 2001 and #1223-1230, 2000–2001)
  - A Love Like Blood (with John Smith, in #1243-1249, 2001)
  - Tharg's Terror Tales (with Gordon Rennie, in #1263, 1285 and Prog 2004, 2001–2003)
  - Storming Heaven (with Gordon Rennie, in Prog 2002 and #1273-1278, 2001–2002)
  - Sinister Dexter: "Black and White" (with Dan Abnett, in #1268, 2001)
  - Judge Death: "My Name is Death" (with John Wagner, in #1289-1294, 2002)
  - From Grace (with Simon Spurrier, in #1357-1361, 2003)
  - Shaun of the Dead (with Simon Pegg and Edgar Wright, in #1384, 2004)
  - Button Man: "The Hitman's Daughter" (with John Wagner, in #1551-1566, 2007)
- Meanwhile... #4: "The Gift of Laughter" (script and art, anthology, Soaring Penguin, 2001)
- Judge Dredd Megazine (anthology, Fleetway/Rebellion):
  - Judge Dredd: "Asylum" (with Gordon Rennie, in vol. 4 #5, 2001)
  - Durham Red "The Scarlet Apocrypha, Part 3" (with Dan Abnett, in vol. 4 #14, 2002)
  - Judge Death: "The Wilderness Days" (with John Wagner, in #209-216, 2003–2004)
  - The Simping Detective (with Simon Spurrier, in #220-227, 234-239 and 253-257, 2004–2007)
- Fort: Prophet of the Unexplained #1-4 (with Peter Lenkov, Dark Horse, 2002–2003)
- The Authority: Scorched Earth (with Robbie Morrison, one-shot, Wildstorm, 2003)
- Warhammer Monthly #84-85: "PlagueBringer" (with Simon Spurrier, Black Library, 2004)
- The End is Nigh #1: "Thirty-Seven Degrees" (with Richmond Clements, anthology, 2005)
- Mary Shelley's Frankenstein (with Gary Reed, graphic novel, Puffin Books, 2005)
- Seven Soldiers: Klarion the Witch Boy #1-4 (with Grant Morrison, DC Comics, 2005)
- Hellblazer #213: "The Gift" (with Mike Carey, Vertigo, 2005)
- 24Seven (anthology graphic novel, Image):
  - "Static" (with Matt Fraction, in Volume 1, 2006)
  - "Flux" (with Ray Fawkes, in Volume 2, 2007)
- Iron Man: Inevitable #1-6 (with Joe Casey, Marvel, 2006)
- Ultimate Fantastic Four Annual #2 (with Mike Carey and Stuart Immonen, Marvel, 2006)
- Civil Wardrobe: "Iron Manufacturer" (with Rich Johnston, one-shot, Brain Scan Studios, 2006)
- Civil War: Front Line #8: "Untitled" (with Paul Jenkins, co-feature, Marvel, 2007)
- Robin vol. 2 #157-158 (with Adam Beechen, DC Comics, 2007)
- Silent War #1-6 (with David Hine, Marvel, 2007)
- Gutsville #1-3 (of 6) (with Simon Spurrier and Matt Timson (#2), Image, 2007–2008)
- Proof #7 (with Fiona Staples — colours on Riley Rossmo, written by Alex Grecian, Image, 2008)
- X-Men: Divided We Stand #2: "The Hole" (with Andy Schmidt, anthology, Marvel, 2008)
- Four Feet from a Rat #4: "HMS Hotwire" (with Mother, anthology, Mam Tor, 2008)
- Azrael: Death's Dark Knight #1-3 (with Fabian Nicieza, DC Comics, 2009)
- Timestorm 2009-2099: X-Men (with Brian Reed, one-shot, Marvel, 2009)
- Days Missing #1, 5 (with Phil Hester, Archaia Studios, 2009)
- Forty-Five: "SoulScreamer" (with Andi Ewington and 44 other artists, graphic novel, Com.x, 2010)
- The Mystic Hands of Dr. Strange: "The Cure" (with Kieron Gillen, anthology one-shot, Marvel, 2010)
- Batman: The Return of Bruce Wayne #2: "Until the End of Time" (with Grant Morrison, DC Comics, 2010)
- Batman and Robin (with Grant Morrison, DC Comics):
  - "Batman and Robin Must Die!" (in #13-15, 2010)
  - "Black Mass" (with Cameron Stewart and Chris Burnham, in #16, 2010)
- Xombi vol. 2 #1-6 (with John Rozum, DC Comics, 2011)
- Shade vol. 2 #9-11 (with James Robinson, DC Comics, 2012)
- Batman Incorporated vol. 2 #0: "Brand Building" (with Grant Morrison and Chris Burnham, DC Comics, 2012)
- Masters of the Universe: The Origin of Skeletor (with Joshua Hale Fialkov, one-shot, DC Comics, 2012)
- Justice League vol. 2 #23.3 (with China Miéville, among other artists, DC Comics, 2013)
- Adventure Time SPOookTACULAR Special: "Secret 'Stache" (with Bryce Carlson, anthology one-shot, Boom! Studios, 2013)
- Uncanny X-Men vol. 3 #5-7, 10-11 and vol. 1 #600 (with Brian Michael Bendis, Kris Anka (vol. 3 #11) and various artists (vol. 1 #600), Marvel, 2013–2016)
- Annihilator #1-6 (with Grant Morrison, Legendary, 2014–2015)
- Garfield #36: "Lab Cat" (with Scott Nickel, co-feature, Boom! Studios, 2015)
- Detective Comics vol. 2 #50: "The Eleven Curious Cases of Batman" (with Peter Tomasi, among other artists, co-feature, DC Comics, 2016)
- The Mighty Thor vol. 2 #12: "The Untold Origin of Mjolnir" (with Jason Aaron and Russell Dauterman, Marvel, 2016)
- The Unworthy Thor #4 (with Jason Aaron, among other artists, Marvel, 2017)
- Doctor Strange (Marvel):
  - "State of Misery" (with Jason Aaron, in vol. 4 #17, 2017)
  - "Strange Way to Go" (with Donny Cates and Chip Zdarsky, in vol. 1 #390, 2018)
- Mighty Morphin Power Rangers Annual '17: "Perfect" (with Trey Moore, co-feature, Boom! Studios, 2017)
- Scream!/Misty Halloween Specials #1-2: "The 13th Floor" (with Guy Adams and John Stokes, anthology, Rebellion, 2017–2018)
- All-New Guardians of the Galaxy #3: "Includere" (with Gerry Duggan, Marvel, 2017)
- Black Bolt #5, 7 (with Saladin Ahmed and Christian Ward (#5), Marvel, 2017–2018)
- Thanos vol. 2 Annual #1: "The Comfort of the Good" (with Al Ewing, co-feature, Marvel, 2018)
- Young Monsters in Love: "Heart-Shaped Box" (with Mark Russell, anthology one-shot, DC Comics, 2018)
- Wonder Woman vol. 5 Annual #2: "Love is Lost" (with James Robinson, among other artists, DC Comics, 2018)
- Avengers vol. 8 #10 (with Jason Aaron, among other artists, Marvel, 2018)
- Valkyrie: Jane Foster #3 (with Jason Aaron and Al Ewing, among other artists, Marvel, 2019)
- Justice League vol. 4 #12: "Drowned Earth, Part 3" (with James Tynion IV and Bruno Redondo, DC Comics, 2019)

=== Covers only ===
- 2000 AD #1213, 1255-1256, 1259, 1302, 1325, 1330, 1377, 1498, 1621 (Fleetway/Rebellion, 2000–2009)
- Violent! #4 (Violent Press, 2001)
- Marvel Holiday Special '06 (Marvel, 2006)
- Sheena, Queen of the Jungle vol. 2 #4 (Devil's Due, 2007)
- The Darkness #74-77 (Top Cow, 2008–2009)
- Days Missing #2-4 (Archaia Studios, 2009)
- Azrael vol. 2 #1 (DC Comics, 2009)
- Arkham Reborn #1-2 (DC Comics, 2009–2010)
- Do Androids Dream of Electric Sheep? #10 (Boom! Studios, 2010)
- The Crazies #3 (Image, 2010)
- Batman Incorporated #6-7 (DC Comics, 2011)
- T.H.U.N.D.E.R. Agents vol. 4 #2 (DC Comics, 2012)
- DC Universe by Alan Moore hc (DC Comics, 2012)
- Higher Earth #1-9 (Boom! Studios, 2012–2013)
- Extermination #1 (Boom! Studios, 2012)
- Bedlam #1-11 (Image, 2012–2014)
- Uncanny X-Men vol. 3 #2 (Marvel, 2013)
- Deathmatch #4 (Boom! Studios, 2013)
- Polarity #1-4 (Boom! Studios, 2013)
- Morning Glories #28 (Image, 2013)
- Batman Incorporated vol. 2 #5 (DC Comics, 2013)
- Clive Barker's Hellraiser: The Dark Watch #1 (Boom! Studios, 2013)
- The Multiversity: The Society of Super-Heroes #1 (DC Comics, 2014)
- He-Man and the Masters of the Universe vol. 2 #9 (DC Comics, 2014)
- The Returning #1-4 (Boom! Studios, 2014)
- Superman Unchained #6 (DC Comics, 2014)
- Darklight gn (Archaia Studios, 2014)
- Klarion #1 (DC Comics, 2014)
- Eternal #1-4 (Boom! Studios, 2014–2015)
- The Wicked + The Divine #10 (Image, 2015)
- UFOlogy #1 (Boom! Studios, 2015)
- Arcadia #1 (Boom! Studios, 2015)
- Oh, Killstrike #1 (Boom! Studios, 2015)
- Broken World #1 (Boom! Studios, 2015)
- The Fiction #1 (Boom! Studios, 2015)
- Secret Wars: Captain Britain & the Mighty Defenders #1 (Marvel, 2015)
- Secret Wars: 1602 – Witch Hunter Angela #3 (Marvel, 2015)
- Klaus #1 (Boom! Studios, 2015)
- Lucas Stand #1 (Boom! Studios, 2015)
- The Electric Sublime #1 (IDW Publishing, 2016)
- WWE: Then. Now. Forever #1 (Boom! Studios, 2016)
- Mighty Morphin Power Rangers vol. 4 #4 (Boom! Studios, 2016)
- Doctor Strange and the Sorcerers Supreme #2 (Marvel, 2016)
- One Week in the Library gn (Image, 2016)
- Darkness Visible #1 (IDW Publishing, 2017)
- The Uncanny Inhumans #18-20 (Marvel, 2017)
- Star-Lord #3 (Marvel, 2017)
- WWE #4 (Boom! Studios, 2017)
- Ice Cream Man #1, 5 (Image, 2018)
- Kino #10-14 (Catalyst Prime, 2018–2019)
- Meanwhile... vol. 2 #9 (Soaring Penguin, 2018)
- Suicide Squad: Black Files #1, 3 (DC Comics, 2019)
- Tony Stark: Iron Man #7 (Marvel, 2019)

=== Role-playing games ===
- Pantheon and Other Roleplaying Games (Hogshead, 2000)
- Heaven and Earth Player's Guide (2nd edition) (Guardians of Order, 2001)
- Nobilis (2nd edition) (Hogshead Publishing Ltd., 2002)
- d20 Menace Manual (Wizards of the Coast, 2003)
- Eberron Campaign Setting (Wizards of the Coast, 2004)
- Dungeons & Dragons Monster Manual III (Wizards of the Coast, 2004)

== Awards ==
- 2001: Won "Best New Talent" National Comics Award for Necronauts (tied with Jock)
- 2002:
  - Won "Best New Talent" National Comics Award
  - Won "Best New Talent" Diamond Comics Award
- 2004: Won "Graphic Novel of the Year" Diamond Comics Award for Necronauts with Gordon Rennie
