= Jack Point =

Judge Point

Publication information
- Publisher: Rebellion Developments
- First appearance: Judge Dredd Megazine #220 (June 2004)
- Created by: Simon Spurrier; Frazer Irving

In-story information
- Alter ego: Jack Point
- Abilities: No superpowers, but has clown equipment filled with crimefighting gadgets. He is also able to beat lie detectors by mentally "rewriting the questions"

Jack Point, also called "the Simping Detective", is a character in the British comic anthology Judge Dredd Megazine, a spin-off from 2000 AD. He was created by Simon Spurrier and Frazer Irving.

He was originally a Mega-City One Street Judge but took to working undercover ("Wally Squad"), pretending to be a private investigator: his cover story is that he was dismissed as a Judge for excessive use of force. As part of his disguise he pretends to be a simp (see below). He works in Sector 13, known as Angeltown, a notoriously corrupt sector of Mega-City One run by the mysterious Boss, and is well known for his clown garb, distinctive noir-pastiche speech patterns, high perversity, and un-judicial habits such as drinking Jack Daniel's and sexual liaisons.

== Name ==
The strip name "The Simping Detective" comes from Point's habit of wearing clown accoutrements like a rubber nose and bow tie – in the fictional universe of Judge Dredd, "simping" is slang for dressing like a fool or simpleton. It is also a play on The Singing Detective. The name 'Jack Point' itself comes from the character of the same name from the Gilbert and Sullivan opera The Yeomen of the Guard, who is a wandering jester.

== Fictional character biography ==
Point's first major case involved investigating the Crystal Blue drug, which led him into a conspiracy involving the corrupt new Sector Chief Daveez, a nun-run school for troubled juves (who were producing the drug), and the vicious alien predators known as the Raptaurs, whom the drug is manufactured from. He just barely managed to destroy all the Raptaurs and adopted the offspring of one - dubbed Cliq - as a pet and back-up. He has since been involved in several cases alongside and conflicting with fellow PI Galen DeMarco, as well as investigating a new incarnation of the mass-murdering Hunters Club. He made an ally and crush in the mysterious PVC-clad Miss Ann Thropé, who helped him on several cases; it turned out she was manipulating him to kill Cliq and gain a nest of new Raptaurs as a result, though only one survived and was adopted by Point as a new pet, Larf. She is currently trying to get him to quit the force and join her team of ex-Judge mercenaries.

In 2134, after Angeltown barely survived Chaos Day, Point was drawn into Judge Smiley's conspiracy (in the story Trifecta): after waking up with no memory, he accidentally killed a brainwashed Wally Squad judge who had been carrying a jester doll. Daveez, working with the corrupt Black Ops Division, attempted to blackmail Point by kidnapping DeMarco; Point saved her, preventing her from killing him by claiming he was going to arrest him "by the book", but then murdered the Sector Chief himself. Escaping Black Ops agents, he found he was now listed as a rogue judge. He turned to Miss Ann Thropé for help and she steered him to a buyer for the doll, which turned out to contain stolen Justice Department data: Judge Dredd then burst in on the sale, revealing the judge Point had killed was Wally Squad chief Folger and he was under arrest for treason. Point barely escaped, abandoned Larf to Black Ops, and tried to flee offworld. He eventually discovered that the whole thing had been set up as part of a secret investigation into Black Ops, in which he himself had been involved, and he rejoined Justice Department.

== Characters ==
Characters who have appeared in the series include:

- Jack Point himself
- Judge Dredd
- Judge DeMarco
- Raptaur - Jack has had two Raptaurs, Cliq and Larf.
- Sector Chief Daveez - Jack's corrupt boss.
- Miss Anne Thrope - A mysterious ex-Judge turned mercenary, trying to recruit Jack
- SJS Judge Kovacs - Investigating Jack for procedural indiscretions
- "The Boss" - An unseen criminal mastermind who runs "The Firm", the main criminal organisation in Angeltown

== Appearances ==
Jack Point appears in the following stories:

- Mega-City Noir: "Gumshoe" (in Judge Dredd Megazine #220, 2004)
- The Simping Detective:
  - "Crystal Blue" (in Judge Dredd Megazine #221–223, 2004)
  - "Innocence: A Broad" (in Judge Dredd Megazine #224–226, 2004)
  - "Dorks of War" (in Judge Dredd Megazine #227, 2004)
  - "Playing Futsie" (in Judge Dredd Megazine #234–236, 2005)
  - "Fifteen" (in Judge Dredd Megazine #237, 2005)
  - "Petty Crimes" (in Judge Dredd Megazine #238–239, 2005)
  - "No Body, No How" (in Judge Dredd Megazine #253–257, 2006–07)
  - "Jokers to the Right" (in 2000 AD #1804–1811, 2012)
  - "Trifecta" (in 2000 AD #1812, 2012)

=== Collected editions ===
- The Simping Detective (by Simon Spurrier and Frazer Irving, trade paperback, 144 pages, September 2007, ISBN 1-905437-44-7) collects all of the stories published from 2004 to 2007.
- The Simping Detective is volume 20 of the series Judge Dredd: The Mega Collection (2015).
