= Trifecta (Judge Dredd story) =

- Publisher: Rebellion Developments
- Publication date: 2 October – 5 December 2012
- Genre: Science fiction
- Title(s): 2000AD progs 1803–1812
- Main characters: Judge Dredd; Dirty Frank; Judge Smiley; Jack Point "the Simping Detective"; Judge Maitland; Judge Bachmann

Creative team
- Writer(s): Al Ewing; Simon Spurrier; Rob Williams
- Artist(s): Henry Flint; Simon Coleby; D'Israeli; Carl Critchlow
- Editor: Tharg (Matt Smith)
- Trifecta: ISBN 178108145X

"Trifecta" is a Judge Dredd story arc published in British comic 2000 AD in late 2012, following on from the earlier strip Day of Chaos. The story was an unannounced crossover between Judge Dredd and its spinoff strips The Simping Detective and Low Life.

Judge Dredd started the arc with a prologue in "prog" (or issue) 1803, "Bullet to King Four", while the new Simping Detective strip started in prog 1804, and Low Life in prog 1805, with seemingly unrelated stories. In prog 1806 a new Judge Dredd story, "The Cold Deck", began. The title refers to a cold deck in card games, where a deck of cards is swapped with a stacked deck during play.

All three strips were revealed to be part of the same story in prog 1807, when a cliffhanger at the end of that week's episode of "The Cold Deck" became the opening of The Simping Detective, which then carried on into Low Life. One of the writers, Simon Spurrier, has said that the story came about because the writers "Got Drunk And Thought It Would Be Funny. The[n] we sobered up and realised how much hard work it'd be, and the funniness went away. So we got drunk again." Al Ewing described the process as "like doing a jigsaw where all three of us have slightly different sets, and we’re trying to make a coherent picture with them. The fact that we made something that’s as coherent as it is, is testament to Si and Rob’s skill as writers and my extreme flukiness". Because "Trifecta" was planned before John Wagner's story "Day of Chaos" was published (only a few weeks before "Trifecta" was due to begin its run), at first the writers were caught out by the changes Wagner's story introduced to Judge Dredd's continuity. However they soon realised that their story actually benefited. Al Ewing later said "It turned out that that was the best thing that could have happened."

All three series ended on cliffhangers in prog 1811, and concluded in a story called "Trifecta", which merged all three series into a single 28-page story occupying the whole of prog 1812.

The names of the villains of the piece, Judge Bachmann, the head of the Church of Simpology, Turner, and the company Overdrive Inc appear to be a joke based on the name of the rock group Bachman-Turner Overdrive.

== Background ==
In previous strips by Gordon Rennie, Dredd had fought a Sov Block strategist named Anatoli Kazan – clone of War Marshal Kazan – and his niece Vienna Dredd had been a target in a Kazan plot. However, Kazan had then defected to Mega-City One and, much to Dredd’s discomfort, given a job as a strategic advisor because of his knowledge of Sov plans.

Spurrier had created a Black Ops Division in his Dredd strips: a morally dubious outfit who were raised to worship the city as the “God-City” and carry out their work unthinkingly. Dredd had run afoul of their operative Domino Blank-One. Al Ewing would bring back Black Ops for a two-part story, The Family Man, where corrupt Black Ops figure Judge Bachmann assassinated civilian dissidents and a liberal judge in Township Three; Dredd was unable to prove her involvement. Over in Spurrier’s The Simping Detective, undercover (or "Wally Squad") judge Jack Point had encountered a criminal operative called Miss Anne Thrope, part of a group of former judges run by an unknown figure. Point also had to deal with his Sector Chief, a corrupt judge named Daveez, and had an ally in Galen DeMarco, an ex-judge turned private investigator.

The previous year, Low Life had concluded a story arc where Dirty Frank, a borderline insane Wally Squad judge, had been revealed to require the tether of the law to remain ‘sane’ and one of the only honest judges in the “Low Life” Squad. Frank had gone on a suicide mission to Hondo City to bring down a yakuza clan and arrest a corrupt former colleague, in order to remain on the force. (Rob Williams, the Low Life writer, had also written a story named Breathing Space in 2005, involving the collapse of oxygen companies on Luna-1.) An earlier Low Life tale had shown that Frank had once been a uniformed judge, but he went insane after a mission went badly wrong, leaving him stranded for days in a frozen wasteland.

In July 2012 the story Day of Chaos had ended, in which survivors of East-Meg One, destroyed by Dredd in the Apocalypse War, had released a weaponised virus in Mega-City One. Using a horde of sleeper agents within Justice Department (one close to Chief Judge Francisco himself) and allied terrorist groups, they undermined any judicial efforts to stop the infection. By the end of “Chaos Day”, 350 million citizens were dead (out of 400 million living at the beginning of the storyline), Francisco had resigned, and Judge Hershey had become chief judge (for the second time) and appointed an interim Council of Five.

In Hershey’s first tenure as chief judge, Dredd had often used his position and their old relationship to pressure her into doing what he wanted. He had also used the threat of resigning to blackmail her into ending the mutant apartheid laws, which had led to the end of her first administration after the other judges voted her out of office. Upon being pressured by him in a similar manner during her second term in office, she snapped at him (in prog #1803), saying, "If you want to be Chief Judge, the chair is yours... But if you don't want the responsibility – if you don't even want the burdens of Council membership – if you'd rather just barge into my office at regular intervals to blackmail me with a badge you'll never hand in, over issues whose complexity you refuse to engage with – then the door is that way."

== Plot ==
Chief Judge Hershey has proposed a massive reorganisation of Justice Department – part of it will merge Wally Squad, Special Judicial Squad, Black Ops, and PSU into a larger Undercover Operations Division, which will be run by the corrupt Judge Bachmann. Dredd is unable to convince Hershey that this is a dangerous idea because he has challenged her authority too often in the past, and she cuts him down in front of the rest of the interim Council. His old ally Judge Buell, head of SJS, is also on the way out, after he failed to undercover the Sov sleepers. One particular critic of Buell is acting-Wally Squad head Folger, put in charge after Judge Hollister had her cover blown and was put into a coma.

Dredd goes on to meet with Anatoli Kazan, to see if the strategist should be executed – Dredd believes that he knew more about the Chaos Day plot than he let on and deliberately let it happen – but Kazan turns out to know about Bachmann and taunts Dredd with the idea that she and Hershey are on the same side. After Dredd storms out, he is contacted by an unknown figure (shown to the reader dunking a biscuit into his tea) who he has met before and who he believes he is needed to deal with the current crisis. A flashback in prog 1809 reveals him to be Judge Smiley: the man who sent Dirty Frank on his fateful mission years ago and who arranged for Frank to join Wally Squad, where he could "use someone."

After this, Frank and Wally Squad judge Jack Point separately wake up with headaches, loss of memory, and recurring flashbacks of a tea-drinking male judge. Both have surveillance devices implanted on them, Point in a tooth and Frank on his head, disguised as toothache and a bump and therefore overlooked by them. Point is in his office at the Sector 13 slum Angeltown, believing he is just hung over and receiving orders to meet an informant. Frank wakes up to find he is on the moon city of Luna-1 and is the new board member at Overdrive Inc, and has no idea what is going on or what he is meant to be doing. All he can figure out is that the psychotic CEO Enormo Overdrive, who spliced his DNA with that of a great white shark, is bringing illegal workers en masse to the moon.

Point's informant turns out to be a fatty who recognises him – it is later revealed to be Folger with “deep tissue body alteration” – and rants about how she is meant to be met by a “badgepriest”. When she attacks him, he calls in his pet Raptaur, Larf, to save him, but the Raptaur’s neurotoxins return Folger to sanity: she has been brainwashed by Bachmann. As she dies she hands Point a jester doll. Realising she was a judge, Point panics and disposes of her body. Her sub-dermal transponder sends out an alert and her body is discovered, with Buell investigating the matter.

Sector Chief Daveez soon contacts Point, demanding he return the doll and threatening to murder a captive Galen DeMarco; to emphasise his point, he kills Galen’s partner Travis. While Point is able to rescue Demarco and murder Daveez, he soon finds himself targeted by Black Ops camoteams. He escapes to find his Personnel Record has been altered and lists him as rogue (he is ecstatic to learn he does not have to be a judge anymore), and he turns to Miss Anne Thrope for aid. Her unseen boss, whose voice Point recognises, refuses to grant any, but Anne points him to someone who will buy the doll. Unknown to Point, she has swapped it for a replica – the "cold deck" of the Judge Dredd story.

An increasingly weary Dredd, who sees no end in sight to the mess the city is in, is contacted by Buell, who has discovered that Folger accessed an unknown "Gold Clearance" file, secret information that removes itself from judicial systems after being accessed (as a security measure). Buell wants Dredd to find it before he has to inform Bachmann, as he knows she’ll use this as an excuse for a power grab – he doesn’t know that Bachmann is already aware and is monitoring them with a psi-judge. Dredd drafts PSU’s Roffman, who realises Folger’s killer used the robot body disposal trucks to transport her corpse; as Point spoke while on a truck, Roffman can use the audio memory of every robot in the sector to find where he is now. Meanwhile, on the moon, Dirty Frank contacts Mega-City One and learns that they think he is still in the Low Life. Another board member turns out to be a fellow Wally Squad judge but Overdrive is already aware and kills him, in order to see if Frank is willing to "accept murder as a business practice." He boasts to Frank that his “business partner” is a high-ranking judge and informs him of Wally Squad infiltrators, but he too doesn't know of Frank's identity. Frank’s over-the-top praise of “The Project” convinces Overdrive that Frank is willing to accept murder as a business practice. He then reveals his project: a second, secret lunar megacity, hidden in a crater and designed for profit.

Dredd finds where Point is selling the doll – which contains a chip with the gold clearance file – but, for some reason, waits a few seconds until the file is transferred before he makes a raid. Point and the buyer (who works for Overdrive) both manage to escape, but Dredd catches up with the buyer and learns the file contains the real names of every undercover judge and spy. Black Ops agents kill the buyer before Dredd can interrogate him further and Roffman, panicked by what the file contained, reports it to Bachmann; she in turn reports to Hershey that Dredd has broken the chain of command. Point, pursued by Black Ops teams as well as regular judges, sacrifices Larf to make his escape and decides to get offworld by joining the Church of Simpology, using the money he grabbed (all of it being "the precise cost" of the "idiocy auditing" he needs to become an offworld simpriest). On the moon, Overdrive gets hold of the file and boasts to Frank what it contains and his plans to slaughter every undercover judge. Frank realises that he’s been placed in deep cover so he can thwart this plan but he reveals himself when he tries to contact Mega-City One; he flees to Overdrive's new Luna-2 but is quickly captured.

Dredd is summoned to meet Hershey, who informs him that she had never trusted Bachmann and had given her a Council role in order to force her into plain view, where she could be better watched and "pinned down." She rebukes him for ensuring that Bachmann is now able to do the reorganisation Buell was scared of, and for not understanding how the chief judge's job works, and openly wonders if he had known what was on the gold file; she also believes Dredd has no respect for her or her judgement. Unknown to Hershey, Bachmann has been spying on her with her psi-judge. Bachmann orders the death of every Wally Squad judge, a scandal that will finish Dredd and Buell and allow her to restock it with her own men. Meanwhile, Point undergoes idiocy auditing: a brainwashing program, as the Church of Simpology is actually part of Black Ops and is turning the simps into sleeper agents. When a Black Ops assassin comes for Point, he willingly surrenders to serve the god-city. However, at Luna-2, Overdrive's interrogation of Frank is failing to work and he does not believe Frank can be Wally Squad, as his cover story is too good and he is absent from the list. When Overdrive's interrogator discovers Frank's implant and tries to remove it, it causes Frank's mind to reset to his pre-insanity days: he escapes his bonds and defeats the guards with combat skills he has never shown before. He sees the list and is delighted when he sees the names on it, as he realises that they are not really the names of Wally Squad judges but of wanted criminals. It is also revealed to the reader that Accounts Judge Maitland had been mindwiped by Judge Smiley, after discovering for him that Black Ops was financially backing Overdrive Inc.

Dredd tries to arrest Bachmann, but she gets the better of him, exhibiting combat skills far exceeding what he had expected, and Dredd is severely wounded. He speaks a code-phrase, "bullet to king four", into a concealed communicator, and this message is received by Point, Frank and Maitland: it is a post-hypnotic command which reawakens their memories of being recruited by Smiley, who has put together a secret team to investigate Overdrive Inc and Bachmann. Smiley had suppressed their memories until now because he was aware that Bachmann's telepaths would discover them otherwise. (Only Dredd could be trusted to keep his mental guard up at all times.)

Frank, finally recalling his mission, reveals his true identity to Overdrive, who orders Luna-2 to attack Mega-City One. Luna-2 is revealed to be a massive spaceship, which takes off and heads for Earth. When Bachmann realises what Overdrive is doing and is unable to stop him, she orders her brainwashed troops to attack the Grand Hall of Justice and kill all the judges. It transpires that Judge Bachmann and Enormo Overdrive have been working together to take over Mega-City One.

It is finally revealed that Judge Smiley was Bachmann's predecessor as head of the Black Ops unit. He had been appointed by Chief Judge Griffin in 2101 to work covertly to ensure that no other corrupt judge (such as Judge Cal) could threaten the city again: "a judge to judge the judges who judge the judges." In 2114 he went so deep undercover that he was presumed dead and was replaced by Bachmann. He recruited Dredd, Frank, Point and Maitland to destroy Bachmann once he realised what she was up to.

Dirty Frank seizes control of Luna-2 and crashes it into the Atlantic Ocean, saving Mega-City One from destruction. Dredd, Point and Maitland – now assisted by Larf and DeMarco – manage to obtain reinforcements and fight off Bachmann's Black Ops forces. Bachmann almost manages to defeat all of them by herself in a showdown in Hershey's office, but is killed by Smiley when he unexpectedly appears on the scene – his secret office turns out to have been in a concealed location right next to Hershey's office all along. Having finally come out into the open for the first time in two decades, Hershey does not trust him, and rebukes Dredd for not having trusted her enough to include her in Smiley's team.

== Chapters ==
- Judge Dredd: "Bullet to King Four" (2000 AD prog 1803). Script by Al Ewing, art by Henry Flint.
- The Simping Detective: "Jokers to the Right" (progs 1804–1811). Script by Simon Spurrier, art by Simon Coleby.
- Low Life: "Saudade" (progs 1805–1811). Script by Rob Williams, art by D’Israeli.
- Judge Dredd: "The Cold Deck" (progs 1806–1811). Script by Al Ewing, art by Henry Flint.
- Judge Dredd, The Simping Detective and Low Life: "Trifecta" (prog 1812). Script by Ewing, Spurrier and Williams. Art by Carl Critchlow.

== Reception ==
Jonathan Cowie wrote for SF^{2} Concatenation called it a "great ride", comparing the story to Tinker Tailor Soldier Spy. David Brothers at ComicsAlliance called the story the best crossover of 2012 in comics.

== Collections ==
The Trifecta storyline was reprinted in a trade paperback in August 2013 (ISBN 178108145X).

It was also reprinted in issue 24 of Judge Dredd: The Mega Collection (December 2015).

== See also ==
- 2000 AD crossovers

| Preceded by Day of Chaos | Major Judge Dredd stories 2012 | Succeeded by Every Empire Falls |
