= Judge Dredd: The Mega Collection =

UK magazine

- Editor: Matt Smith, 2000 AD
- Categories: Science Fiction
- Frequency: Fortnightly
- Format: Hardback book format 25cm (h) x 19.3cm (w)
- Publisher: Rebellion Publishing
- First issue: 2015
- Final issue Number: 2018; 90
- Company: Hachette Partworks Ltd
- Country: United Kingdom
- Language: English
- Website: Official Website
- ISSN: 2055-7663

Judge Dredd: The Mega Collection was a British fortnightly partwork collection of hardback books published by Hachette Partworks. The series is made up of 90 volumes which contain thematic collections of stories about 2000 AD’s Judge Dredd and related characters, as well as bonus material including previously unpublished art. The spine art on the books combine to display a new image by artist Patrick Goddard. The series was also accompanied by the launch of a series of podcasts called '2000 AD Thrill-Casts' which, after the 6th episode, widened its focus to 2000 AD in general. On 5 July 2017 it was officially announced that the series had been extended from 80 to 90 issues.

The series is the third recent comics series by Hachette Partworks. It follows the success of The Official Marvel Graphic Novel Collection and Marvel's Mightiest Heroes Graphic Novel Collection and is the first which departs from Marvel comics. It is available in the UK, Ireland and Australia.

Following a successful trial, it was announced on 1 August 2017 that the Mega Collection would be joined on the stands by 2000 AD: The Ultimate Collection. This new collection would focus on the other stars of the parent title but still include a few Judge Dredd books. None of these, however, would be duplicates of those already included in the Mega Collection.

== List of books ==
"Issue" refers to the order of publication, and "Volume" refers to the order in which the books are intended to be kept once the 90-volume collection is complete.

Issue	Volume	Title	Collecting	Cover Artist	UK Release Date	AU/NZ Release Date
01	01	America	Judge Dredd: America; America: The Fading of the Light; Cadet; Judgement Call; Blood and Duty; Firepower; Snowstorm	Colin MacNeil	21 January 2015	6 August 2015
02	24	Mechanismo	Judge Dredd: Mechanismo; Mechanismo Returns; Body Count; S.A.M.; Safe Hands	Colin MacNeil	4 February 2015	13 August 2015
03	36	The Apocalypse War	Judge Dredd: Block Mania; The Apocalypse War	Carlos Ezquerra	15 February 2015	20 August 2015
04	45	Origins	Judge Dredd: The Connection; Origins; The Spirit of Christmas	Brian Bolland	4 March 2015	1 September 2015
05	10	Psi-Judge Anderson: Shamballa	Judge Anderson: Shamballa; The Jesus Syndrome; Satan; The Protest; R*evolution	Arthur Ranson	15 March 2015	17 September 2015
06	25	Mandroid	Judge Dredd: Mandroid; Mandroid: Instrument of War; Escape From Atlantis; Bad Mother	Kev Walker	1 April 2015	1 October 2015
07	55	The Heavy Mob	Holocaust 12: Skyfall; Storm Warning Brit-Cit Brute: Brit-Cit Brute; Trilogy Wynter: Cold Justice Judge Dredd: Father Earth; Debris; Warzone	Dylan Teague	15 April 2015	12 October 2015
08	32	The Cursed Earth	Judge Dredd: The Cursed Earth; Last of the Bad Guys	Mike McMahon	29 April 2015	29 October 2015
09	14	Devlin Waugh: Swimming in Blood	Devlin Waugh: Swimming in Blood; Brief Encounter; Red Tide; Bite Fight	Cliff Robinson	13 May 2015	12 November 2015
10	61	Shimura	Shimura: Outcast; Fearful Symmetry; Chambara; The Transcendental Assassin; Heavy Metal; Assassins; Dragon Fire; Ronin Breed; Scary Monsters; The Harder They Come; Angels of Death Judge Dredd: Web	Colin MacNeil	27 May 2015	26 November 2015
11	49	Day of Chaos: The Fourth Faction	Judge Dredd: The Skinning Room; The Further Dastardly Deeds of P.J. Maybe; Nadia; The Fourth Faction; Elusive; The Assassination List	Henry Flint	10 June 2015	10 December 2015
12	02	Democracy Now!	Judge Dredd: Letter from a Democrat; Revolution; The Devil You Know; Twilight's Last Gleaming; Politics; Raider; SABs; Direct Action; John Cassavetes is Dead; Mega-City Confidential	John Higgins	24 June 2015	24 December 2015
13	60	Hondo City Justice	Judge Dredd: Our Man in Hondo Shimura: Shimura; Executioner, Deus X Judge Inspector Inaba: Babes with Big Bazookas Hondo City Justice: Hondo-City Justice; Project Behemoth; Revenge of the 47 Ronin	Cliff Robinson	15 July 2015	7 January 2016
14	08	Psi-Judge Anderson: The Possessed	Judge Anderson: The Possessed; Hour of the Wolf; Contact; Beyond the Void; Helios	Brett Ewins	15 July 2015	14 January 2016
15	75	Alien Nations	Judge Dredd: Raptaur; Raptaur Returns; Skar; The Alien Way; Howler; Prey; Alien Wedding; He Came From Outer Space; Alien Town's Burning	Cliff Robinson	15 August 2015	28 January 2016
16	42	Doomsday For Dredd	Judge Dredd: Beyond The Call Of Duty; Return of the Assassin; The Trial; Trial of Strength; War Games: Endgame	Dylan Teague	19 August 2015	11 February 2016
17	31	Oz	Judge Dredd: Oz	Steve Dillon	2 September 2015	25 February 2016
18	50	Day of Chaos: Endgame	Judge Dredd: Eve of Destruction; Tea for Two; Wot I Did During the Worst Dissaster in Mega-City History; Chaos Day; The Days After; Wastelands	Henry Flint	16 September 2015	10 March 2016
19	03	Total War	Judge Dredd: Terror; Total War; After the Bombs; Visiting Hour; The Searchers; Horror in Emergency Camp 4	Simon Coleby	30 September 2015	24 March 2016
20	21	The Simping Detective	The Simping Detective: Gumshoe; Crystal Blue; Innocence: A Broad, Playing Futsie, Fifteen, Petty Crimes, No Body, No How Demarco, P.I.: Ways to Die; Deep Blue Death; The Fierce and the Furious	Cliff Robinson	14 October 2015	7 April 2016
21	04	The Dead Man	The Dead Man Judge Dredd: Bloodline; (Note: In the volume, 'Bloodline' was shown as Originally published in 2000 AD Progs 650-662 instead of the correct value of 583-584) The Shooting Match; A Letter to Judge Dredd; Tale of the Dead Man; (Note: The artwork on this story is credited to Will Simpson, however the last three parts were drawn by Jeff Anderson) Nightmares.	John Ridgway	28 October 2015	21 April 2016
22	30	Target: Judge Dredd	Judge Dredd: The Fists of Stan Lee; The Return of Death Fist; The Art of Geomancy; Fight; Enter Jonni Kiss; Goodnight Kiss; The Brainstem Man; The Man Who Broke the Law; Hitman; Missing.	Jim Baikie	11 November 2015	5 May 2016
23	15	Devlin Waugh: Chasing Herod	Devlin Waugh: Chasing Herod; Reign of Frogs; Sirius Rising; Innocence & Experience	Colin Wilson	25 November 2015	19 May 2016
24	51	Trifecta	Judge Dredd: The Family Man, Bullet to King Four; The Cold Deck; Trifecta The Simping Detective: Jokers to the Right. Low Life: Saudade	Carl Critchlow	9 December 2015	2 June 2016
25	37	Judgement Day	Judge Dredd: Top Dogs; Judgement Day; The Kinda Dead Man	Carlos Ezquerra	23 December 2015	16 June 2016
26	19	Low Life: Paranoia	Low Life: Paranoia; Heavy Duty; Rock and a Hard Place; He's Making a List...; Con Artist; Baby Talk; War Without Bloodshed.	Henry Flint	6 January 2016	30 June 2016
27	67	Cursed Earth Koburn	Judge Dredd: Sturm Und Dang; El Maldito Cursed Earth Koburn: Kuss Hard; Burial Party; The Assizes; Malachi; Going After Billy Zane.	Carlos Ezquerra	20 January 2016	14 July 2016
28	56	Beyond Mega-City One	Judge Dredd: Atlantis; Emerald Isle; Book of the Dead; Gulag; Regime Change	Brendan McCarthy	3 February 2016	21 July 2016
29	44	Satan's Island	Judge Dredd: Sin City; Case for the Defence; Reprisal; The Trial of Orlok; Jumped; Lawcon (Note: In the volume, 'Lawcon' was shown as Originally published in 2000 AD Progs 3.76-3.79 instead of the correct value of Judge Dredd Megazine 3.76-3.79)	Kev Walker	17 February 2016	4 August 2016
30	76	Klegg Hai!	Maelstrom The Corps: Fireteam 1 The Kleggs: The Kleggs! Judge Dredd: Meatmonger; Love Hurts!; Scavengers; The Heart is a Lonely Klegg Hunter; Trapper Hag; Revenge of Trapper Hag	Chris Weston	2 March 2016	18 August 2016
31	05	Necropolis	Judge Dredd: By Lethal Injection; Rights of Succession; Dear Annie; Necropolis	Carlos Ezquerra	16 March 2016	1 September 2016
32	40	The Pit	Judge Dredd: The Pit; True Grot; Unjudicial Liaisons; Last Rites; Declaration of War; Bongo War	Cliff Robinson	30 March 2016	15 September 2016
33	06	Judge Death Lives!	Judge Dredd: Judge Death; Judge Death Lives; Theatre of Death; Judge Death: The True Story; Dead Reckoning Judge Anderson: Four Dark Judges Judge Death: Tea with Mrs Gunderson	Brian Bolland	13 April 2016	29 September 2016
34	11	Psi-Judge Anderson: Childhood's End	Judge Anderson: Reasons to be Cheerful; The Witch? Report; Childhood's End; Voyage of the Seeker; Postcards from the Edge; Postcard to Myself	Arthur Ranson	27 April 2016	13 October 2016
35	66	Missionary Man: Goin' South	Missionary Man: Prologue; Mardi Gras; Goin' South; Apocrypha; Mark of the Beast Judge Dredd: True Grit; Lonesome Dave; The Black Plague; The Hotdog Run; Shantytown	Henry Flint	11 May 2016	27 October 2016
36	28	The Life And Crimes Of PJ Maybe	Judge Dredd: Bug; What I Did During the Summer Holidays by P.J. Maybe, 13 (Class 2); The Further Advenshers of P.J. Maybe Age 14; The Confeshuns of P.J. Maybe; Wot I Did During Necropolis by P.J. Maybe Aged 15½; P.J. & the Mock-Choc Factory; The All New Adventures of P.J. Maybe; You're a Better Man than I, Gunga Dinsdale; Bring Me The Heart of P.J. Maybe; Six; The Monsterus Mashinashuns of P.J. Maybe; The Gingerbread Man; Wot I Did for Chrissmas	Cliff Robinson	25 May 2016	10 November 2016
37	43	Doomsday for Mega City One	Judge Dredd: Bad Frendz; Worst of Frendz; Gun Play; The Scorpion Dance; The Contract; The Narcos Connection; Doomsday; Volt Face	Colin Wilson	8 June 2016	17 November 2016
38	20	Lowlife: Hostile Takeover	Lowlife: Creation; Jive Turkey; Hostile Takeover; The Deal Judge Dredd: Titan	D'Israeli	22 June 2016	24 November 2016
39	38	Inferno	Purgatory Judge Dredd: Inferno; Frankenstein Division; Death Aid	Carlos Ezquerra	6 July 2016	8 December 2016
40	77	Horror Stories	Judge Dredd: The Haunting of Sector House 9; Judgement; Road Stop; The Fear that Made Milwaukee Famous!; The Vampire Effect; Horror House; Christmas with the Blints; The Jigsaw Murders; The Beating Heart	Brett Ewins	20 July 2016	22 December 2016
41	33	The Day The Law Died	Judge Dredd: Crime and Punishment; Outlaw; Bring Me the Head of Judge Dredd; The Day the Law Died; Helter Skelter	Mike McMahon	3 August 2016	5 January 2017
42	12	Psi-Judge Anderson: Half Life	Judge Anderson: Half-Life; WMD; Lock-In; City of Dead; Lucid	Arthur Ranson	17 August 2016	19 January 2017
43	72	The Art of Taxidermy	Judge Dredd: The Taxidermist; Revenge of the Taxidermist; Harry Sheemer, Mon Amour; Zombies; The Night of the Rad-Beast; Bob Zombie - Scouse of 20,000 Horrors The Taxidermist: Return of the Taxidermist Darren Dead: Meet Darren Dead; Eats, Shoots & Kills	Steve Dillon	31 August 2016	2 February 2017
44	80	Dark Side of the Moon	Breathing Space Judge Dredd: Darkside; Land Race; The First Luna Olympics; Luna War; The Face-Change Crimes; The Oxygen Board; Full Earth Crimes; Global Psycho; Killer Elite	Brian Bolland	14 September 2016	16 February 2017
45	47	Tour of Duty: Backlash	Judge Dredd: Backlash; Under New Management; Tour of Duty; Dragon's Den; Lust in the Dust; Tour of Duty Interlude: Mega-City One; The New Deal; Snake; Pink Eyes; Gore City	Carlos Ezquerra	28 September 2016	2 March 2017
46	07	Young Death	Judge Death: Young Death: Boyhood of a Superfiend; My Name is Death; The Wilderness Days	Frazer Irving	12 October 2016	16 March 2017
47	57	Calhab Justice	Calhab Justice: Calhab Justice; Hogmanay; Dounreay; Casualty; Unfinished Business; Flashback: McTash; Family Snapshot; False Dawn Judge Joyce: When Irish Pies are Smiling Judge Dredd: Innocents Abroad	John Ridgway	26 October 2016	30 March 2017
48	39	Wilderlands	Judge Dredd: Conspiracy of Silence; Prologue; The Tenth Planet; Wilderlands; Parting Shots; The Candidates; Voting Day	Trevor Hairsine	9 November 2016	13 April 2017
49	79	Into the Undercity	The Creep: Creep; Creep's Day Out; True Love Judge Dredd: A Very Creepy Christmas; Birthday Boy; New Tricks; Ratfink's Revenge; First Blood; Master of Fear; Gator	Tiernen Trevallion	23 November 2016	27 April 2017
50	16	Fetish	Judge Dredd: Fetish; Old Wounds Devlin Waugh: A Mouthful of Dust; Vile Bodies; All Hell	Cliff Robinson	7 December 2016	11 May 2017
51	09	Psi-Judge Anderson: Engram	Judge Anderson: Triad; Leviathan's Farewell; The Prophet; The Random Man; The Screaming Skull; Engram; A Fistful of Denimite; The Mind of Edward Bottlebum	David Roach	21 December 2016	25 May 2017
52	23	Banzai Battalion	Judge Dredd: Beyond the Wall; A Magic Place; Banzai Battalion; No Man's Land; Everything in the Garden; A Walk in the Park; Down on Sausage Tree Farm Banzai Battalion: The Fitz; Save the Fitz; Robot Wars	Jock	4 January 2017	8 June 2017
53	73	Heavy Metal Dredd	Heavy Metal Dredd: A Mega-City Primer; Rock On, Tommy Who?; Chicken Run; The Man Who Killed Judge Dredd; The Legend of Johnny Biker; The Return of Johnny Biker; The Fan; Too Much Monkee Business; The Most Dangerous Guitar in the World; Mort Rifkind Rides Again; The Big Hit; Graceland; Monkey Beat; Kiss of Death; Ironfist; Night Before Christmas; The Great Arsoli; Bimba; The Ballad of Toad McFarlane Judge Dredd: Who Killed Pug Ugly?; Poor Johnny; The Weather Man; A Night at the Opera; Muzak Killer; Muzak Killer - Live!	John Hicklenton	18 January 2017	22 June 2017
54	68	Cursed Earth Carnage	The Helltrekkers Citi-Def: Field Trip Sleeze 'n' Ryder	Anthony Williams	1 February 2017	6 July 2017
55	52	The Chief Judge's Man	Judge Dredd: The Chief Judge's Man; On the Chief Judge's Service; Revenge of the Chief Judge's Man; Psycho Block; Bad Manners; Flippers; Rotten Manners	Jock	15 February 2017	20 July 2017
56	63	Armitage: City of the Dead	Armitage: City of the Dead; Apostasy in the UK; Dumb Blonde; The Mancunian Candidate; The Unpleasantness at the Tontine Club; The Underground	Patrick Goddard	1 March 2017	3 August 2017
57	26	Mean Machine	Judge Dredd: Dredd Angel; A Merry Tale of the Xmas Angel; The Three Amigos Mean Machine: Travels with Muh Shrink; Son of Mean Machine; Mean Streets	Ron Smith	15 March 2017	17 August 2017
58	48	Tour Of Duty: Mega-City Justice	Judge Dredd: Snakebite; Invitation to a Hanging; What's Another Year?; Sex, Vi & Vidslugs; Out Law; The Talented Mayor Ambrose; Mega-City Justice	Ben Willsher	29 March 2017	31 August 2017
59	65	Missionary Man: Treasure Of The Sierra Murder	Missionary Man: Legend of the Unholy Drinker; Season of the Witch; Sanctuary; The Undertaker Cometh; Treasure of the Sierra Murder; Medicine Show; Nightriders; Mississippi Burning; Crusader; The Big Sleazy; Night of the Hunter; Juggernaut; The Shootist; Storm Warnings	John Ridgway	12 April 2017	14 September 2017
60	18	Undercover Brothers	Lenny Zero: Lenny Zero; Dead Zero; Wipeout; Zero's 7 Brit-Cit Babes Judge Dredd: The Wally Squad; Driving Desire; The Shirley Temple of Doom	Jock	26 April 2017	28 September 2017
61	71	Fast Food	Judge Dredd: The League of Fatties; Anatomy of a Crime; Requiem for a Heavyweight; The Eat of the Night; Magnificent Obsession; The Bazooka; Fat Christmas; Hot Night in 95; Fast Food; Fat Fathers	Cam Kennedy	10 May 2017	12 October 2017
62	78	Tales From The Black Museum	Tales From The Black Museum: The Wages of Crime; Headshots; Ruddler's Cuddlers; Burn!; Message Inside Reads; Tastes Like Chicken; Feeders and Eaters; God of Gamblers; Shades of Grue; Apres Moy, La Deluge; Short Fuse; Build a Better Mousetrap; The Incredible Teatime Torture Show; Who Do the Voodoo That You Do?; Rat Runs; The Shadow over James Block; Heart of Iron; Dead Man's Gum; Purgation; A Judge's First Duty; The Invisible Bullet; Say it with Flowers; The Unfortunate Case of High-Altitude Albert; Scouting for Bots; The Girl with the Gila Munja Tattoo	Dom Reardon	24 May 2017	26 October 2017
63	53	Brothers of the Blood	Judge Dredd: The Return of Rico; Blood Cadets; Sector House; Leaving Rowdy; Love Story III: The End of the Affair; The Satanist; Brothers of the Blood; Class of '79; Night School; Fifty-Year Man	Mike McMahon	7 June 2017	9 November 2017
64	41	The Hunting Party	Judge Dredd: The Pack; The Hunting Party; Lost in Americana; Fog on the Eerie; Dance of the Spider Queen; Camp Demento; Shark Country; Trail of the Man-Eaters; Ratfink	Cliff Robinson	21 June 2017	23 November 2017
65	59	Behind The Iron Curtain	Red Razors: Red Razors; The Secret Origin of Comrade Ed; Doctor's Orders; The Hunt for Red Razors Samizdat Squad: Black Flowers; Red Skies; Grey Zone	Brian Bolland	5 July 2017	7 December 2017
66	64	Missionary Man	Missionary Man: Salvation at the Last Chance Saloon; A Town Called Intolerance; Bad Moon Rising; The Promised Land; Place of the Dead	Frank Quitely	19 July 2017	21 December 2017
67	54	Insurrection	Insurrection: Insurrection; Insurrection II; Insurrection III	Colin MacNeil	2 August 2017	4 January 2018
68	70	Mad City	Judge Dredd: Mad City; Crossing Ken Dodd; Slow Crime Day; Caught In The Act; Bury My Knee At Wounded Heart; John Brown's Body; Street Fighting Man; Talkback; The Moby; Sunday Night Fever; Crazy R Raiders; Unamerican Graffiti; Alien Zoo; Borrowed Time; Finger of Suspicion; Lost in Cyberspace; Mega-City Rumble	Cliff Robinson	16 August 2017	18 January 2018
69	34	The Judge Child	Judge Dredd: The Judge Child; Dead Ringer	Brian Bolland	30 August 2017	1 February 2018
70	58	The World At Law	Pan African Judges: Pan-African Judges; Fever of the Gods Zancudo Tiger Sun, Dragon Moon Deathwatch: Faust & Falsehood	D'Israeli	13 September 2017	15 February 2018
71	46	Mutants in Mega-City One	Judge Dredd: The Streets of Dan Francisco; Mutants in Mega-City One; The Facility; The Secret of Mutant Camp 5; Emphatically Evil; ...Regrets; The Edgar Case; Mutie Block	Carl Critchlow	27 September 2017	1 March 2018
72	22	Independent Operators	Harmony: Blood and Snow; Homeward Bound; Transient 114; Genocide; Headcase; Hell Gate; Killer Instinct; The Piratical Legend of Anne Bonney O'Rork: Totem	Trevor Hairsine	11 October 2017	15 March 2018
73	74	Famous Monsters	Judge Dredd: Cry of the Werewolf; Out of the Undercity; Dog Soldiers; Tarantula; Costa Del Blood; The Blob; Nosferatu; Black Widow	Leigh Gallagher	25 October 2017	29 March 2018
74	35	Krysler's Mark	Judge Dredd: The Fink; Destiny's Angels; City of the Damned; In the Year 2120	Steve Dillon	8 November 2017	12 April 2018
75	17	Weird Science	Pussyfoot 5: Fast Breeder; Alien Sex Fiend! Strange & Darke: New Blood The Inspectre: Requiem; Baptism of Fire; Damn'd Spirits All; Trial By Fury (Note: In the volume, 'Trial by Fury' was shown as Originally published in Judge Dredd Megazine 3.30-3.23 instead of the correct value of 3.30-3.33) Cabal	Nigel Raynor	22 November 2017	26 April 2018
76	69	Mega City Underworld	Judge Dredd: Bato Loco Bato Loco: True Romance; Head Job; Kiss Me Deadly Tempest: Here Comes Trouble; Time Zero Marauder	Simon Coleby	6 December 2017	10 May 2018
77	62	Armitage	Armitage: First Cut; Influential Circles; Flashback; Flashback II; Bodies of Evidence	Charlie Adlard	20 December 2017	24 May 2018
78	13	Stars of Psi Division	Karyn: Skinner; Beautiful Evil; Concrete Sky Janus, Psi-Division: Will O' The Wisp; House of Sighs; A New Star; Faustus Juliet November: Phoenix Falling Judge Dredd: Master Moves; Pyrokinetics	Dylan Teague	3 January 2018	7 June 2018
79	29	Chopper	Judge Dredd: Midnight Surfer Chopper: Soul on Fire; Song of the Surfer; The Big Meg	Colin MacNeil	17 January 2018	21 June 2018
80	27	Fallen Angels	The Angel Gang: Angelic; Before They Wuz Dead Fink Angel: Pizen: Impossible Mean Machine: The Mean Machine Goes to Town; The Mean Machine Gets Married; The Geek; Support Yore Local Bastich; The Last Vidshow Harke & Burr: Antique and Curious; Hamster Horror; Grief Encounter; Secret Origin; Satanic Farces	Lee Carter	31 January 2018	5 July 2018
81	85	Tales of Ordinary Madness	Judge Dredd: 22nd Century Futsie; Loonies' Moon; Diary of a Mad Citizen; Juve's Eyes; The Lemming Syndrome; Love Story; Love Story II: Futile Attraction; It Pays to be Mental; It Still Pays to be Mental; Still Mental after all these Years; The Law According to Dredd; Tomb of the Judges; The Dredd Syndrome; The Witness; Crazy Barry, Little Mo; Banana City; The Hottie House Siege; Return to the Hottie House; It's Deja Vu All Over Again (Note: In the volume, 'It's Deja Vu All Over Again' was shown as Originally published in 2000 AD prog 1007 instead of the correct value of progs 1282-1283)	Kevin O'Neill	14 February 2018	19 July 2018
82	81	Psi-Judge Anderson: The Trip	Judge Anderson: Big Robots; Wiierd; Biophyle; The House of Vyle; The Trip; Stone Voices	Dave Taylor	28 February 2018	2 August 2018
83	87	Served Cold	Judge Dredd: Served Cold; What the Hitler Saw; The Bean Counter; The Rich Cabaret; The Cop; Magic Bullets; The Americans; Cockroaches; Rehab; Doctor What?	PJ Holden	14 March 2018	16 August 2018
84	83	Blood of Emeralds	Judge Dredd: Salvage; In Control; Caterpillars; Shotgun; Blood of Emeralds; Terror Rising; The Grindstone Cowboys; Dust to Dust; The Lion's Den; Reclamation; From the Ashes	Tom Foster	28 March 2018	30 August 2018
85	86	Wogue Wobots	Judge Dredd: Krong; Robot Wars; The Neon Knights; Walter's Secret Job; Walter the Wobot; Synthi-Caf Vindilu; The Sleeper; Giant; Night of the Fog; Meka-City; Something Abnormal about Norman; Monsteroso; Attack of the Sex-Crazed Love Dolls!	Ian Gibson	11 April 2018	13 September 2018
86	82	Day of Chaos: Aftermath	Judge Dredd: Debris; Innocent; Payback; Asleep; Sealed; Save Him; Wolves; Cypher; Suicide Watch; The Forsaken; Skulls; Bender; Ferals	Brian Bolland	25 April 2018	
87	90	Lawless	Lawless: Welcome to Badrock; Between Badrock and a Hard Place; Of Munce and Men; Long-Range War	Phil Winslade	9 May 2018	
88	84	Crazy Town	Judge Dredd: Sob Story; Palais de Boing; Uncle Ump's Umpty Candy; Alien Seeds; The Aggro Dome; Otto Sump's Ugly Clinic; Gunge; Blobs; Citizen Snork; Spugbug; Get Smart; The Ugly Bug Ball; Russell's Inflatable Muscles; Simp; Simp about the House; Bum Rap; Simp City; Couch Potatoes; Born to Zoosh; The Performer; Persistent Vegetative State; (Note: In the volume, 'Persistent Vegetative State' was shown as Originally published in Judge Dredd Megazine 4.12-4.13 instead of the correct value of 2000 AD progs 1726-1727) Citizen Sump; Arms Buyer's Almanac 2106	Ron Smith	23 May 2018	
89	89	Psi-Judge Anderson: Dead End	Cadet Anderson: Big Girls Don't Cry; Teenage Kyx; Algol; One in Ten Psi-Judge Anderson: Lawless; Dead End; Mutineers Judge Dredd: The Pits	Cameron Stewart	6 June 2018	
90	88	War on the Streets	Judge Dredd: Block War Judge Dredd: The Mega-Rackets: (Note: The Mega-Rackets were a series of inter-related Judge Dredd stories which ran in 2000AD from Prog 209 to Prog 223) The Body Sharks; The Perp Runners; The Umpty Baggers; The Blitz Agencies; The Psychos; The Numbers Racket; The Stookie Glanders; Mob Wars Judge Dredd: The Executioner; The Graveyard Shift; Rumble in the Jungle; The Wreckers; West Side Rumble; A Day at the Block Wars	Brian Bolland	20 June 2018	
