= Rufus Dayglo =

British comics artist

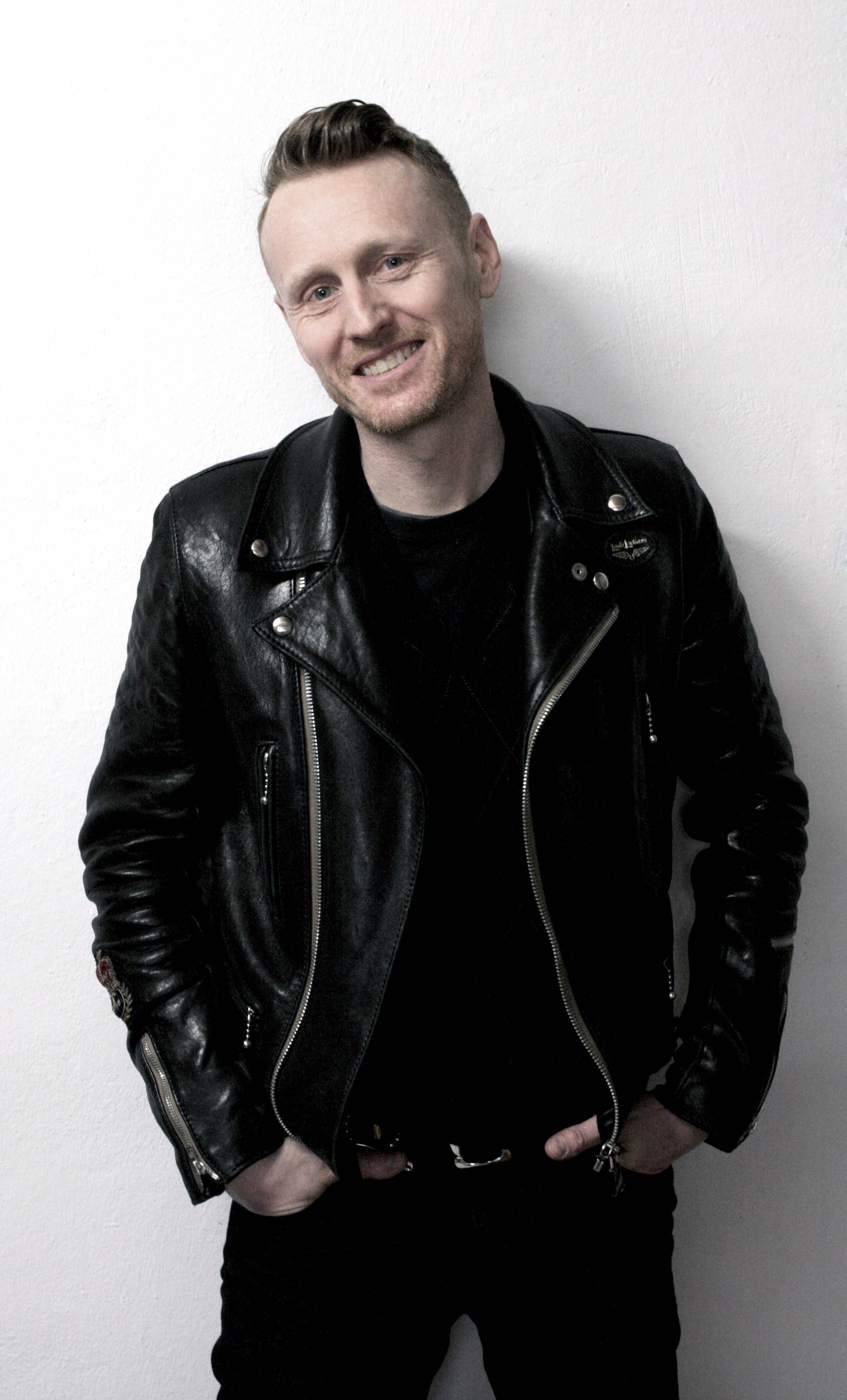
- Born: United Kingdom
- Areas: Artist, Penciler, Inker
- Notable works: Tank Girl, Counterfeit Girl, Bad Company, Last Gang In Town, Judge Dredd

Rufus Dayglo is a British comics artist working in comics, illustration, and storyboards. He is working for 2000 AD and Titan Books in the United Kingdom, and DC Vertigo, IDW Publishing and Image Comics in the United States. His Tank Girl work has also been published by Ankama Editions in France in 2011.

== Biography ==
Dayglo started his career in the animation industry working on feature films, pop promos, storyboarding and commercials before moving into comic book art.

Dayglo relaunched Tank Girl with Alan Martin (writer) and Ashley Wood (artist), and drew 5 complete series of Tank Girl with co-creator Alan Martin (writer), for Titan Books (Bad Wind Rising mini series), Image Comics (Image Tank Girl quarterly one shots), and IDW Comics (The Royal Escape mini series). The Tank Girl series Dayglo has drawn are Tank Girl: Visions of Booga, Tank Girl: Skidmarks, Tank Girl: The Royal Escape, Tank Girl: We Hate Tank Girl, and Tank Girl: Bad Wind Rising.

He has drawn Snaked, a mini series with writer Clifford Meth for IDW, Tank Girl: The Gifting (drawing issues 2-4), Metal Gear Solid 2: Sons of Liberty and Low Life with Rob Williams for 2000 AD.

Dayglo has worked with Ashley Wood's 3A toys. He also drew two series of Bad Company and the series Counterfeit Girl for 2000 AD.

Dayglo is releasing new creator owned projects in 2019.

== Bibliography ==
- Tharg's Future Shocks:
  - "The Burning Deck" (with Jaspre Bark, in 2000 AD #1359, 2003)
  - "A Sound of Intergalactic Thunder" (with Al Ewing, in 2000 AD #1449, 2005)
- Whatever Happened To?: "John 'Giant' Clay" (with Gordon Rennie, in Judge Dredd Megazine #216, 2004)
- "Earth War" (with Jaspre Bark, in 2000 AD Winter Special 2005)
- Tales From the Black Museum: "God of Gamblers" (with Al Ewing, in Judge Dredd Megazine #251, 2006)
- Doomed #4: "F. Paul Wilson's Faces" (with F. Paul Wilson, IDW Publishing, 2006)
- Metal Gear Solid 2: Sons of Liberty #9,10,11 and 12 (art, with Alex Garner and finishes by Ashley Wood, IDW Publishing)
- Tank Girl
  - The Gifting #2, 3 and 4 (4-issue mini-series, IDW Publishing, May–August, 2007)
  - Visions of Booga (4-issue mini-series, IDW Publishing, May 2008-ongoing)
  - Skidmarks (in Judge Dredd Megazine #275-, 2008-ongoing)
  - Tank Girl
  - The Royal Escape (4-issue mini-series, IDW Publishing )
  - Bad Wind Rising (4-issue mini-series, Titan Books )
  - We hate Tank Girl (Image Comics)
- Snaked (with Clifford Meth, IDW Publishing, December 2007-ongoing)
- GHOSTS issue 1 "The night after I took the data entry job, I was visited by my own ghost" (with Al Ewing, Vertigo Comics, 2012)
- VERTIGO QUARTERLY issue 2: MAGENTA "The Shoe in the Attic" (with Peter Milligan, Vertigo Comics, 2014)
- The Unwritten: Volume 7 (with Mike Carey Vertigo Comics, 2013)
- Low Life: "War without Bloodshed" (with Rob Williams, in Judge Dredd Megazine, #271-274, 2008)
- Judge Dredd "On the Job" (with John Wagner, in 2000 AD Free Comic Book Day Issue May 5, 2012)
- Judge Dredd "Streets of Dan Francisco" (with John Wagner, in 2000 AD #1520, 2007)
- "Last Gang In Town" (6 issue mini series, with Simon Oliver, Vertigo Comics 2015)
- "Bad Company: First Casualties" (with Peter Milligan, 12 part series, in 2000 AD #1950 - #1961 2015)
- "Counterfeit Girl" (with Peter Milligan, 10 part mini series, in 2000 AD #2000 - #2010 2016)
- "Bad Company: Terrorists" (with Peter Milligan, 12 part series in 2000 AD #2061 - #2072 2017)
- "Judge Dredd: Cursed Earth" (board game, Osprey Games, 2019)
