= Storming Heaven (comics) =

Storming Heaven is a comic strip created by Gordon Rennie and Frazer Irving, appearing in the British magazine 2000 AD. It features battles between psychedelic superheroes.

== Characters ==
- Dr Trips, based on Timothy Leary
- Thomas Caliban, based on Charles Manson

== Plot ==
In the early 1960s Professor Adam Laar tested his own experimental brand of LSD on himself, releasing superhuman powers. He assembled a group of superpowered hippies but the dark side of the era emerged in the form of a Charles Manson figure and a final battle ensued.

== Publication ==
- Storming Heaven (with Gordon Rennie and Frazer Irving, in 2000 AD prog 2002 & #1273-1278, 2001-2002)
- Storming Heaven: The Frazer Irving Collection (Rebellion Developments, collected edition; 144 pages, January 2007)

== Reception ==
Then editor Andy Diggle had a policy to supercharge strips so they moved along faster than usual and packed more into each instalment. However, with Storming Heaven, this resulted in an overly hurried story that never lived up to its potential.
