= Shaun of the Dead (comics) =

Series of comics

The film Shaun of the Dead has been adapted into a comic book twice.

== 2000 AD ==
=== There's Something About Mary ===
The comic anthology 2000 AD produced a Shaun of the Dead strip called "There's Something About Mary" which was written by Simon Pegg and Edgar Wright, with art by Frazer Irving and published in 2000 AD #1384, 2004). It was published as part of the run up to the film and followed Mary, the first zombie, and other characters.

Mary works as a checkout girl at the Landis Supermarket where she has a brief encounter with Shaun. Suffering from the same existential boredom as him, she heads home, only to notice that a large intimidating man is following her. She heads into the Winchester where she asks a patron if she can sit with him to ward off the large man. After talking with the patron for a while, he tells Mary that he feels sick and she helps him to his feet, only for him to collapse outside the pub. As Mary calls for help, the now zombified patron bites Mary on the neck. The large man returns in an attempt to assault her, only for her to bite him, converting him too, and revealing him to be the large zombie that accompanied her in Shaun and Ed's backyard. As Shaun and Ed drunkenly return home, Mary narrates, "Life is full of surprises. At least that's what they say. I wouldn't know... I don't have one."

=== Plot Holes ===
The DVD extras include the 2000 AD strip (in "Zombie Gallery" within the "Raw Meat" section) by Irving, and three new strips, drawn by Oscar Wright and narrated by the characters, which fill in the plot holes (in, appropriately, "Plot Holes" within the "Missing Bits" section).

== IDW Publishing ==
IDW Publishing produced a comic book adaptation of the film, written by IDW's editor-in-chief Chris Ryall and drawn by Zach Howard. It was published as a four-issue mini-series in 2005.

== See also ==
- List of comics based on films
- Three Flavours Cornetto
