= Fort: Prophet of the Unexplained =

Comic book series by Peter M. Lenkov

- Cover of the Dark Horse Comics Fort TPB. Art by Frazer Irving.

Publication information
- Publisher: Dark Horse Comics
- Schedule: Monthly
- Format: Limited series
- Genre: Steampunk
- Publication date: June - September, 2002
- No. of issues: 4
- Main character(s): Charles Fort; H. P. Lovecraft

Creative team
- Created by: Peter M. Lenkov; Frazer Irving
- Written by: Peter M. Lenkov
- Artist: Frazer Irving
- Letterer: Digital Chameleon
- Editor(s): Dave Land; Philip Simon

Collected editions
- Dark Horse: ISBN 1-56971-781-8
- Titan Books: ISBN 1-84023-579-9

Fort: Prophet of the Unexplained is a Dark Horse Comics comic book limited series created by writer Peter M. Lenkov and artist Frazer Irving. It should not be confused with the 1971 biographical study Charles Fort: Prophet of the Unexplained by Damon Knight, which apart from the title has no connection with the comic book series.

== Comic ==
Fort, featuring the fictional adventures of the famed anomalist Charles Fort is a four-issue miniseries written by Peter M. Lenkov, with art by Frazer Irving. The series was released monthly between June and September 2002 by Dark Horse Comics.

Fort: Prophet of the Unexplained marked Charles Fort's second major comic outing - the first being Necronauts also drawn by Irving.

== Plot ==
It's 1899 and as the end of the century draws near a strange killer lurks on the streets of New York. However, only famed anomalist Charles Fort's careful analysis of his news clippings reveals the pattern and further investigation revels some strange findings. At the same time he is monitoring some strange shooting stars, ably assisted by H.P. (a young H. P. Lovecraft) which leads to his encounter with an alien. Falsely accused of the murders, he has to team up with the extraterrestrial and find the real killer.

== Charles Fort ==
Charles Fort was an early twentieth century American writer, philosopher and anomalist. In four books, between 1919 and 1932, he catalogued thousands of reports of anomalous phenomena, making important early contributions to ufology, cryptozoology and parapsychology.

== Collected editions ==
The series has been collected into a trade paperback:

- Fort: Prophet of the Unexplained (Dark Horse, ISBN 1-56971-781-8, Titan Books, ISBN 1-84023-579-9)

== Film adaptation ==
On October 6, 2011, Robert Zemeckis is producing a film adaptation of the comic book with Evan Spiliotopoulos writing the script.

== Awards ==
- Bram Stoker Award for Best Illustrated Narrative (2002): Peter M. Lenkov for his work on Fort: Prophet of the Unexplained (runner-up)

== See also ==
Charles Fort also features prominently in:

- Necronauts
- The Searchers
