= Necronauts =

Illustrated story

- Cover of Necronauts (2007 Rebellion Developments), trade paperback collected edition, art by Frazer Irving
- Created by: Gordon Rennie; Frazer Irving

Publication information
- Publisher: Rebellion Developments
- Schedule: Weekly
- Title(s): 2000 AD Prog 2001, #1223-1230
- Formats: Original material for the series has been published as a strip in the comics anthology(s) 2000 AD.
- Genre: Horror
- Publication date: December 13 2000 – February 21 2001
- Number of issues: 9
- Main character(s): Charles Fort; Arthur Conan Doyle; H. P. Lovecraft; Harry Houdini

Creative team
- Writer(s): Gordon Rennie
- Artist(s): Frazer Irving
- Editor(s): Andy Diggle

Reprints
- Collected editions
- Necronauts: ISBN 1-904265-09-X

Necronauts was a story appearing in the British comics anthology 2000 AD, by British comics writer Gordon Rennie and artist Frazer Irving. It brought Irving to public attention as his high contrast black and white artwork complemented Rennie's dark storyline.

== Publication history ==
The outline for the story and was written in 1991 and was originally intended for Tundra Publishing, where Rennie had published White Trash, however:

it just sat around in a box for years as about a two-page rough story synopsis, gathering dust. I always knew it was a great story premise. I could have Vertigo-ed it up and submitted it there, but I don't think some of the funnier things in it - eg. Charles Fort swatting zombies with a cricket bat - would have survived the transition. I'm glad I wrote it in 1999 rather than 1991; my writing's stronger now that it was then, and I think the story greatly benefited from the long wait. Also, Frazer Irving wasn't around in 1991, and his contributions - not just in the wonderful art he produced, but also as someone to bat ideas off - was invaluable.

The story formed part of a general push by editor Andy Diggle to get more horror into the comic: "I commissioned Necronauts because I thought horror would work well in 2000 AD."

It eventually started in the 2000 AD end of year special in 2000, Prog 2001, and continued in issues #1223-1230.

== Characters ==
- Charles Fort, investigator of anomalous phenomena
- Arthur Conan Doyle, creator of Sherlock Holmes with a strong interest in the paranormal
- H. P. Lovecraft, teller of dark tales
- Harry Houdini, escapologist and debunker of fraudulent Spiritualists
- A mysterious evil flier, who while never named is clearly based on Charles Lindbergh.

== Plot ==
In 1926, while practising a new trick, Houdini has a near-death experience, awakening the mysterious Sleepers. Meanwhile, Lovecraft is visited by a talking raven, and a séance that Sir Arthur is attending is attacked by a strange force that possesses the medium. Sir Arthur travels to New York City to speak to Houdini, where they are attacked by Tcho-Tchos, summoned by The Sleepers' human minions (The Hidden Masters of the World: The Illuminated Ones).

While Houdini and Lovecraft travel back into the spiritual plane, Fort and Sir Arthur must protect their bodies from the assembling dark forces. However, there is also a traitor in their midst, and one of their number will die.

== Collected editions ==
The story has been reprinted as a trade paperback by Rebellion Developments:

- Necronauts (64 pages, December 2007, ISBN 1-904265-09-X, February 2008, ISBN 1-905437-71-4)
- Tharg's Terror Tales Presents Necronauts and Love Like Blood (collects Necronauts and A Love Like Blood, 128 pages, October 2011, ISBN 1-907992-51-0)

== Awards ==
- 2000 Eagle Awards, Favourite Comic Strip to Appear in a UK Magazine or Comic (runner-up)
- 2001 National Comics Awards, Best New Talent (Tied win): Frazer Irving for Necronauts
- 2004 Diamond Comics Awards, Graphic Novel of the Year

== See also ==
- Fort: Prophet of the Unexplained, another comic starring Fort and Lovecraft also illustrated by Irving
- The Searchers, another comic featuring Fort and Doyle
- The Arcanum, a novel by Tom Wheeler, which also teams Doyle, Houdini and Lovecraft
- Cthulhu Mythos in popular culture
