= List of wrestling-based comic books =

Comic book superheroes and professional wrestling characters have long been viewed in the same vein of entertainment as colorful characters that are larger than life, and numerous wrestlers have appeared or been referenced in comic books.

Spider-Man's first costumed appearance was the result of Peter Parker's need for a colorful gimmick, as he planned to enter and win a wrestling challenge.

== Wrestlers in American comics ==
=== Azteca Productions ===
- El Gato Negro

=== Valiant Comics ===
- WWF BattleMania series

=== Marvel Comics ===
- World Championship Wrestling series

=== Chaos! Comics ===
- Undertaker series
- Mankind special
- Stone Cold Steve Austin limited series
- Chyna special
- Chyna II special
- The Rock special

=== Image Comics ===
- 10th Muse based on Rena Mero, aka Sable
- Nash limited series based on Kevin Nash

=== Warrior Productions ===
- Warrior series based on The Ultimate Warrior

=== Angel Gate Press ===
- 10th Muse: Book Of Lights special also based on Mero

=== El Rey Network ===
- Lucha Underground (comics)

== Wrestlers in International comics ==
Mexico and Japan have also had characters crossover into comic books. Mexican Wrestling Comic Books

- ''Santo El Enmascarado de Plata Comic about El Santo.
- ''El Increìble Blue Demon Comic about Blue Demon.
- ''La Leyenda de Blue Demon Comic about Blue Demon.
- ''Huracan Ramirez El Invencible Comic about Huracán Ramírez.
- ''El Imperio De Las Tinieblas Comic about Tinieblas.
- ''Tinieblas, El Hijo de la Noche Comic about Tinieblas.
- ''Tinieblas Comic about Tinieblas.
- ''Sensacional de Luchas(Sensational Struggles) About many wrestlers.
- ''Santo. La Leyenda de Plata(Holy. The Legend of Silver) Comic about El Hijo del Santo and El Santo.
- ''Blue Demon Jr. El Legado(Blue Demon Jr. The Legacy) Comic about Blue Demon, Jr. and Blue Demon.
- ''Místico. Príncipe de Oro y Plata.(Mystical. Prince of gold and silver.) Comic about Místico.
- ''El Ojo del Cibernético(The Eye of the cybernetic) Comic about Cibernético.

Pro Wrestling Superstar Retsuden is a series of biographic manga published in Japan in the 1980s.

== Comics based on or including wrestling ==
- To Be The Man : Evil Ain’t Good by Jared Davis, illustrated by Josh Taylor
- Misfit Wrestling Federation, independent comic series
- Super Pro K.O! by Jarrett Williams, published by Oni Press
- Ringside by Joe Keatinge, Nick Barber and Simon Gough, published by Image
- Futaba-Kun Change! manga, Studio Ironcat (US publisher)
- Sonambulo
- El Zombo Fantasma three-issue miniseries, 2004, tpb, 2005, Dark Horse Comics
- The Nail by Steve Niles and Rob Zombie, limited series, 2004, Dark Horse Comics
- Rob Zombie's Spookshow International series, 2003-current, CrossGen Comics, MVCreations and Image Comics
- The Haunted World of El Superbeasto, by Rob Zombie. Also being turned into an animated film too.
- Love and Rockets, by Los Bros Hernandez. One of the main storylines, Hoppers 13, by Jaime Hernandez, includes many prominent wrestler characters.
- Headlocked
- Johnny Cougar a comic strip about a Native American (Cherokee) professional wrestler appearing in the British comic magazine Tiger
- Kinnikuman manga
- Wanna-Be's manga
- Galaxy Wrestling All-Stars The Comics website: http://galaxywrestlingall-stars.blogspot.com/
- Rival Angels webcomic,
- Glorious Wrestling Alliance, published by Graphic Universe
- Kodi Symmons - A Wrestling Story
- Invasion from Planet Wrestletopia written by Ed Kuehnel & Matt Entin, illustrated by Dan Schkade, colors by Marissa Louise and lettered by Dave Lanphear. Published by Suspicious Behavior Productions
- Wanna Be the Strongest in the World

== Comics in wrestling ==
- "Arachnaman" (portrayed by Brad Armstrong) appeared in World Championship Wrestling (WCW) in the early 1990s wearing a costume resembling that of Spider-Man's aside from its yellow coloration instead of red. His gimmick included shooting 'webs' upon his ring entrance.
- Sting changed from a colorful flamboyant performer to a dark brooding figure after being falsely accused of betrayal in the nWo storyline in late 1996. As a result, he adopted a black and white look and brooded in the rafters of the arenas, mimicking The Crow by James O'Barr in appearance to the point of actual birds appearing as well. Scott Hall suggested the idea to Sting, knowing of the concept but not having seen or read any of the materials himself.
- Tiger Mask was originally a popular Japanese manga character; as a result, New Japan Pro-Wrestling (NJPW) decided to capitalize on this by employing the young Satoru Sayama to play the character as an actual wrestler. The resultant success led to the character being reassigned, following Sayama's retirement, to other wrestlers, namely the now high-profile Mitsuharu Misawa and Koji Kanemoto. The current incarnation is the fourth, played by Yoshihiro Yamazaki.
- Gangrel was a vampire character from the White Wolf brand of comics and role-playing games. World Wrestling Entertainment (WWE) employed a wrestler previously known as the Vampire Warrior (real name: David Heath) to play the character, as the leader of a cult-like faction called The Brood, which also consisted of the wrestlers Edge and Christian.
- Gregory Helms wrestles as The Hurricane, a superhero gimmick with elements of The Green Lantern.

== Other connections ==
- Rob Van Dam is an avid collector, who cites Ghost Rider as his favorite character, and operates his own store, RVD's Five Star Comics, in California, and plans to write his own series.
- Raven wrote an issue of Spider-Man's Tangled Web for Marvel Comics. The issue featured a partial rewrite of Spider-Man's history, and focused on Crusher Hogan, the wrestler whom Spider-Man first tested his powers on.
- CM Punk has also been hired as a writer for Marvel Comics.
- Bert Assirati was colorist for several The Beano comics in addition to wrestling, most notably Tin-Can Tommy.
