= Low Life (comics) =

- Created by: Rob Williams; Henry Flint

Publication information
- Publisher: Rebellion Developments
- Schedule: Weekly
Title(s)
2000 AD and Judge Dredd Megazine
- Genre: Science fiction
- Publication date: April 2004 – present
- Main character(s): Aimee Nixon; Dirty Frank

Creative team
- Writer(s): Rob Williams
- Artist(s): Henry Flint; Simon Coleby; Rufus Dayglo; D'Israeli
- Letterer(s): Ellie De Ville
- Editor(s): Tharg (Matt Smith)

Reprints
- Collected editions
- Mega-City Undercover: ISBN 1-905437-52-8
- Mega-City Undercover vol. 2: ISBN 1781080410
- Mega-City Undercover vol. 3: ISBN 1781084580
- Judge Dredd: Trifecta: ISBN 178108145X
- Low Life: Paranoia: ISBN 1907519882

Low Life is a science fiction comics story published in British anthology 2000 AD. Set in the world of Judge Dredd, it was created by Rob Williams and Henry Flint.

Simon Coleby, Rufus Dayglo and D'Israeli have also illustrated the strip. It is about undercover judges.

== Characters ==
Aimee Nixon, a female judge who has voluntarily had her left arm removed and replaced with a robotic prosthetic. Can beat any lie detector. Her appearance is based on "Courtney Love with a broken nose". She was arrested and sentenced to 20 years' hard labour in the prison colony on Titan, after which she was replaced as the lead character of Low Life by supporting character Dirty Frank. Later, in a Judge Dredd story, she led a prison mutiny and mass escape.

Dirty Frank, a judge who has been undercover so long that he has lost his sanity. Refers to himself in third person, has dubious personal hygiene and can urinate for twenty three minutes non-stop. According to the introduction in the collected graphic novel, his physical appearance is based on Alan Moore.

Eric "Mortal" Coil, a Judge who foolishly volunteered for a mission to track down a lost object in the Cursed Earth and ended up turned into an intelligent baby.

Thora, a female judge who has undergone face and body changes to appear much older.

== Collected editions ==
All episodes written by Rob Williams (except where noted):

- Mega-City Undercover (160 pages, Rebellion Developments, January 2008, ISBN 1-905437-52-8) collects:
  - "Paranoia" (art by Henry Flint, in 2000 AD #1387–1396, 2004)
  - "Heavy Duty" (art by Henry Flint, in 2000 AD #1397–1399, 2004)
  - "Rock and a Hard Place" (art by Simon Coleby, in 2000 AD #1425–1428, 2005)
  - "He's Making a List..." (art by Simon Coleby, in 2000 AD Prog 2006, 2005)
  - "Con Artist" (art by Simon Coleby, in 2000 AD #1484–1490, 2006)
  - "Baby Talk" (art by Simon Coleby, in 2000 AD #1521–1524, 2007)
- Mega-City Undercover volume 2 (144 pages, Rebellion, April 2012, ISBN 1781080410) collects:
  - "War Without Bloodshed" (art by Rufus Dayglo, in Judge Dredd Megazine, #271–274, 2008)
  - "Creation" (art by D'Israeli, in 2000 AD #1624–1631, 2009)
  - "Jive Turkey" (art by Smudge, in 2000 AD Prog 2010, 2009)
  - "Hostile Takeover" (art by D'Israeli, in 2000 AD #1700–1709, 2010)
- Mega-City Undercover volume 3 (112 pages, Rebellion, October 2016, ISBN 1781084580) collects:
  - "The Deal" (written by Andy Diggle, art by D'Israeli, in 2000 AD #1750–1761, 2011)
  - "The Really Big Christmas Sleep" (art by D'Israeli, in 2000 AD Prog 2015, 2014)
  - "Zero's 7" (written by Andy Diggle, art by Ben Willsher, 2000 AD # 1792-1799, 2012)
- Judge Dredd: Trifecta (174 pages, Rebellion, August 2013, ISBN 178108145X) collects:
  - "Saudade" (art by D'Israeli, in 2000 AD #1805–1811, 2012)
  - "Trifecta" (co-written with Al Ewing and Simon Spurrier; art by Carl Critchlow, in 2000 AD #1812, 2012)
- Low Life: Paranoia (160 pages, Rebellion (US Edition), June 2011, ISBN 1907519882) collects:
  - "Paranoia" (art by Henry Flint, in 2000 AD #1387–1396, 2004)
  - "Heavy Duty" (art by Henry Flint, in 2000 AD #1397–1399, 2004)
  - "Rock and a Hard Place" (art by Simon Coleby, in 2000 AD #1425–1428, 2005)
  - "Con Artist" (art by Simon Coleby, in 2000 AD #1484–1490, 2006)
  - "Baby Talk" (art by Simon Coleby, in 2000 AD #1521–1524, 2007)
