= Mega-City One =

Chief city in the Judge Dredd universe

- Mega-City One before the Apocalypse War

In-universe information
- Type: City-state
- Character: Judge Dredd
- Publisher: Rebellion Developments

Mega-City One is a fictional city that features in the Judge Dredd comic book series and related media. A post-nuclear megalopolis covering much of what is now the Eastern United States and some of Canada, the city's exact geography depends on the writer and artist working the story. From its first appearance it has been associated with New York City's urban sprawl; originally presented as a future New York, it was retconned as the centre of a "Mega-City One" in the third issue.

The Architects' Journal placed it at No. 1 in their list of "comic book cities".

== Development ==
When the series Judge Dredd was being developed in 1976–77 it was originally planned that the story would be set in New York, in the near future. However, when artist Carlos Ezquerra drew his first story for the series, a skyscraper in the background of one panel looked so futuristic that editor Pat Mills asked him to draw a full-page poster of the city. Ezquerra's vision of the city – with massive tower blocks and endless roads suspended vast distances above the ground with no visible means of support – was so futuristic that it prompted a rethink, and a whole new city was proposed. Art director Doug Church suggested that the city should extend along the entire Eastern Seaboard, and be called Mega-City One, and his idea was adopted.

While the first Judge Dredd story is set in "New York 2099AD", prog 3 ("prog" = issue) retconned that and said New York was just part of Mega-City One. The back of prog 3 included an Ezquerra "Futuregraph" poster of Mega-City One (a page from an unused Dredd story), which said the city stretched from Montreal to Georgia and had 150 million citizens; it was part of the "United States of the West" (USW). Prog 4 then established that Mega-City One was surrounded by wildernesses from the Atomic Wars. The 150 million population was later revised to 100 million in earlier strips and abruptly bumped to 800 million later on. The United States of the West concept was dropped entirely; a "United Cities of North America" of three megacities was mentioned in prog 42 and then itself dropped in favour of Mega-City One being an independent entity.

In early strips, the Judges existed alongside a regular police force, were popular with the citizens, and the people enjoyed robots doing the work, with the "Grand Judge" saying they would not consent to work more than ten hours a week. Over time, the strip would have the Judges as a feared police-state force with sole power; prog 118 (written when unemployment was going up in Britain) established that citizens resented being unemployed and took up bizarre crazes to deal with the boredom, and this remained part of the strip from then on.

== Description ==
Mega-City One evolved out of a growing conurbation stretching from Boston to Washington DC, which took form in the 21st century to cope with the escalating population crisis in the United States and – as a solution chosen to deal with the high crime rate – led to the introduction of the Judge system.

Mega-City One was one of three major areas to survive the nuclear war in 2070, due to an experimental laser missile-defense system built not long before. The other two being Mega-City Two (encompassing California, Washington and Oregon) and Texas City. Apart from those megacities, the United States has been reduced to the Cursed Earth.

Eventually, Mega-City One extended to Miami, Florida, which became a holiday resort, and spread west into Ohio and/or West Virginia. The megacity was built over the top of the old cities and the polluted Ohio River, creating the lawless Undercity, though a few buildings like the Empire State Building and Statue of Liberty were moved to Mega-City One for the tourists. Maps of the city show that in the early 22nd century, it stretched roughly from southern Maine down through Florida and to the north-east has absorbed the Quebec City-Windsor Corridor in Canada. 800 million citizens lived in the city at this point.

The population and city sprawl were halved by nuclear attack and Soviet invasion in 2104 (in the 1982 story "The Apocalypse War"), with the loss of the entire south in a saturation nuclear strike. The north-west and upper north were also lost, leaving the city stretching from roughly New Hampshire through North Carolina and losing the Canadian territory. A small part of the north west survived: the North West Hab Zone, separated from the rest of the city by a stretch of radioactive wasteland called Nuke Alley and linked to the main city by a bridge. The population remained at around 400 million from 2104 until 2134.

Mega-City One has a far greater population density than any city in the present-day world. Most city dwellers (citizens) live in huge apartment blocks (50,000+), though many citizens live a perpetually nomadic existence in vehicular mo-pads (mobile homes) due to inadequate housing provisions. These citizens travel the city via the many public transport routes available, rarely stopping. Some mo-pads are quite luxurious, complete with swimming pools.

Most of the city's energy supply is covered by geothermal energy in the form of a controlled volcano called the Power Tower.

For administrative purposes, the city is divided into 305 sectors, most of them renumbered to fit the new size of the city after the Apocalypse War, and clumped into Central, North, South, East, and West. Sectors 1 (the centre) to 300 constitute the main city. The North-West Hab Zone encompasses sectors 301-5. The Hab Zone was mostly ignored by the city and Sector 301 became disparagingly nicknamed "The Pit" due to its high crime rate, until Chief Judge Volt had it cleaned up in 2118. Other slum areas have been called "Angeltown" (Sector 13's slums) and "the Low Life".

Following the events of the 2011–12-story Day of Chaos (set in 2134), Mega-City One was left in ruins and almost 90% of its population was killed. After decades of being the main megacity and superpower on Earth, the city is now bankrupt and in severe decline with many judges considering the situation unsustainable.

However, over the following few years, the city began to grow again due to immigration, taking in of refugees and the gradual return of millions of citizens who sat out the plague overseas and off world. By October 2137, the population stood at seventy two million and was growing rapidly reaching 100 million around 2139. However, the destruction of the Academy of Law during Chaos Day has disrupted the supply of cadets, and it is all the remaining judges can do to cope with the expanding population, as it will be years before replacement of losses is reliable again.

In 2019, a story set in 2141 stated that the population had been revised upwards to 130 million, due to a number of reasons, including the overestimation of the number of deaths in Chaos Day, a declining death rate since then, and births and immigration. It also confirmed that many citizens fled either before or during the Chaos plague and have been slowly returning in the seven years since, and that the Chaos bug disproportionately killed the elderly ensuring a higher number of fertile age survivors to repopulate the city. By this point, then-Chief Judge Hershey believed the city could once again safely absorb such a vast increase in numbers, as many undamaged blocks remained available to be re-inhabited.

=== Other territories ===
Mega-City One has protectorates and colonies outside of the city walls:

- Mega-City One held joint jurisdiction over Atlantis, an underwater city located mid way across the Atlantic along with Brit Cit until 2143 when it was destroyed by a mafia hit squad during a failed hit, killing most of its population.
- Various colonies on other planets and on moons, used as both settings and background detail in Dredd and its spin-off strips. Law and the city's central government are enforced by Colonial-Marshal Judges; indigenous aliens and MC-1 colonialists are often oppressed and some cause insurgencies. Military forces are often mentioned as being space based (see Military). The spin-off strip Insurrection showed that the Special Judicial Service have an outer-space army to deal with any colonies where the judicial staff declare independence. The main push into space began roughly in 2095, under Chief Judge Goodman, as a way of supplying the city with resources that a post-war Earth could no longer provide. The most famous colony is the penal colony on Titan, where corrupt Judges are sent.
- Various farms, mines, prisons, and protectorate townships in the Cursed Earth. The Cursed Earth Auxiliaries patrol the area for the Justice Department. The city used to have mutant camps, where mutants born in the city were deported, but these were ended after the repeal of the mutant apartheid laws.
- Townships One through Four: since 2130, the bulk of mutant citizens live in large towns outside of the city. Law enforcement is mostly done by mutant deputies, and unlike the city they still use the jury trial system (unless a judge demands otherwise).

== City Blocks ==
Blocks are huge and can be considered to be a small town in themselves. Each one will typically possess a hospital, gymnasium, school, and shopping district. A citizen can quite literally live their whole lives without leaving their block. Due to the high unemployment rate, boredom is rife among citizens – this, coupled with the high loyalty citizens develop to their blocks, along with a city-defence militia for most city blocks, leads to many "Block Wars", riots (more like small wars) between two or more blocks.

Blocks are named after famous or historical figures, often with current events in mind. A typical example – shortly after the Nicole Kidman and Tom Cruise separation there was an episode with block war breaking out between the "Kidman" and "Cruise" Blocks. A proposed crackdown on civil rights in Britain led to a block being named David Blunkett Block in one story.

== Government ==
Since the abolition of democratic government in America in 2070, Mega-City One has been a dictatorship run by the Justice Department. It subsequently became an independent city-state following the break-up of the United States and had already been granted autonomy within the Union in 2052. Its ruler is the Chief Judge, in current stories (as of October 2025) Judge Logan. He is accountable to a council of five senior judges. The citizens are permitted to have an elected city council and mayor, but with no significant power: the idea is that a facade of democracy will placate most people.

In 2113 a referendum was held in which the people were allowed to decide whether to restore democratic government, but by this time the memory of democracy had become so distant that the majority of citizens did not bother to vote, and most of those who did opted to retain the status quo.

In the early years of Judge Dredd, Mega-City One had not been established as a dictatorship – "The Purple People Breeder" (2000 AD Sci-Fi Special 1978) mentioned "presidential candidate Howard Surb", while "Ryan's Revenge" (Dan Dare Annual 1979) had the Mayor giving orders to Justice Department. The Luna-One story arc briefly mentioned the governing body "the Grand Council of Judges" and "the Triumvirate", part of a unified state called the United Cities of North America, but this was dropped by prog 61.

=== List of chief judges ===
Judge Dredd and Chief Judge Volt (painted by Carlos Ezquerra)

1. Judge Fargo (2031–2051)
2. Judge Solomon (2051–2057)
3. Judge Goodman (2057–2101)
4. Judge Cal (2101)
5. Judge Griffin (2101–2104)
6. Judge McGruder (2104–2108)
7. Judge Silver (2108–2112)
8. Judge McGruder (2112–2116)
9. Judge Greel (acting chief judge, 2116)
10. Judge Volt (2116–2121)
11. Judge Hershey (2122–2131)
12. Judge Francisco (2131)
13. Judge Sinfield (acting chief judge, 2131–2132) (usurper)
14. Judge Francisco (2132–2134)
15. Judge Hershey (2134–2141)
16. Judge Logan (2141–incumbent)

=== List of mayors ===
(This is not a complete list of mayors, but only of those who appeared in the comic.)

- Mayor Amalfi
- Mayor Jim Grubb
- Mayor Dave the Orangutan, an actual orangutan who was elected as a mass protest vote against incompetent politicians.
- Mayor Lindberg
- Mayor Katz
- Mayor Donald Byron Ambrose, actually serial killer PJ Maybe in disguise (having murdered the real Ambrose – and Katz – before the election)
- Mayor Tony Blore
- Mayor Denny Oneman

The identity of the current mayor is not known (as of May 2024).

A story in 2000 AD #32 featured a cameo role by a character referred to as "City Father Washington," whose status and role in the city's history has not been elaborated on.

== Judges ==
Judges are the product of many (normally 15) years' of training and psychological conditioning. Training takes place in the Academy of Law and generally begins at age five. The Judges recruit promising children, and also grow clones of themselves.

Lawgiver mark II

Their standard issue firearm is the Lawgiver handgun, which can fire six different kinds of ammunition. It has a handprint-reading sensor which only allows its owner to use it, and a self-destruct device to kill or maim unauthorised users. Judges ride Lawmaster bikes, which are heavily armed and have artificial intelligence.

The Judges themselves are not above the law. A violation that would earn a citizen a few months in an Iso[lation]-Cube may earn a Judge a twenty-year sentence of hard labour on Saturn's moon, Titan, after surgical modification to enable the convict to survive Titan's atmosphere. They are also expected to live in celibacy, to avoid personal attachments that might bias them or make them vulnerable to manipulation and blackmail.

New graduates from the Academy of Law are classified as "rookie" Judges, and must pass an assessment by their more experienced colleagues in order to achieve full Judge status. Rookies who fail this assessment, as well as cadets who fail at the Academy, may be hired to fill auxiliary roles within the Justice Department or may leave the organization altogether.

The Justice Department has its own domestic intelligence division (the Public Surveillance Unit), and their own medical facilities. There are a number of specialist divisions within the Judges, notably Psi Division, which consists of psychic judges used to predict the future and read minds, and Tek Division, made of forensic scientists and engineers. The SJS (Special Judicial Squad) monitors and polices the Judges internally.

Judges may be assigned to a particular city block; referred to as "Block Judges," they handle both criminal and civil cases within their territory.

Judge McGruder taking the Long Walk (drawn by Cliff Robinson).

When a street judge retires from service at the end of his career, he may choose to take the "Long Walk", leaving Mega-City One for exile outside its borders. He may do this either in the Cursed Earth, a radioactive desert outside the city walls, or in the Undercity, the ruins of New York that lie beneath the mega-city. The Long Walk begins with a brief ceremony at the city gates, wherein the retiring judge walks through an honour guard of judges as they discharge their firearms into the air, while another judge formally bids him farewell. Judges who take the Long Walk are expected never to return, but to die "bringing law to the lawless." Alternatively, retiring judges may instead be placed in administrative or teaching posts instead of taking the Long Walk.

=== Origin ===
The Judge System was created by Eustace Fargo, then special government prosecutor for street crime, between 2027 and 2031, to combat a rising tide of violent crime and to speed up the process of justice. While there was heavy protest in Congress over the idea of abandoning due process, the electorate was in favour and President Gurney (who supported Fargo's plan) was re-elected with a massive majority. The original uniforms heavily resembled those of normal American police officers, albeit with helmets and heavy body armour, and rode Lawranger motorcycles. Following the Third World War of 2070 and discovering that President Booth had stolen the election, the Judges seized power.

== Civilian population ==
The citizens are shown to be a mixed bag. 98% are unemployed (due to advances in robotics) and range from lazy and sloth-like to highly rebellious violent criminals, bent on destroying and killing as much as they can for whatever reason they can think of at that time, if any. Most of the Judges show a lack of empathy towards them. For example, in his Christmas message, Chief Judge Francisco asked citizens if a large number that were on welfare could commit suicide in order to help balance the budget for the following year. Some Judges openly view citizens as a nuisance to be removed, or like Judge Manners, as a sub-human race to be used and abused as the Judges see fit.

The citizens occupy their time with many strange and outright bizarre hobbies, such as simping (recreational stupidity), bat gliding, sky surfing and peeping (spying on people at home and in public), which is illegal when done for voyeuristic purposes, but legal when done under the authority of a Judge. If any of these ever get out of hand, and if there is no legal justification for banning, Judges simply impose a heavy tax on them, restricting them to only the few very wealthy citizens.

Most are poorly educated and many can barely read or write, some sectors are said to be entirely illiterate, but Judges aren't that concerned, as it makes it easier for them to control and they can weed out the more intelligent simply when major crimes occur. Those that can read though are not much better, for example, when a book that detailed how to commit suicide was released, thousands of previously non-suicidal citizens (including the book's author) killed themselves since they had read how to do it in the book. At one point in some of the more dangerous blocks, Judges put sedatives into the air systems to help keep the citizens docile and easier to control.

Despite the dominance of the Judges, citizens occupy many scientific, technical and professional roles in Mega-City One. Developments in fields including food production, materials, medicine, technology and architecture have been attributed to civilian scientists and engineers. Citizens also operate businesses, work in entertainment and serve as diplomats, although the latter remain subject to the authority of the Judges. Professions unique to the setting include human taxidermy and competitive eating. Opportunities for citizens to acquire significant wealth or political power legally are limited, and several prominent criminals, including P. J. Maybe and Nero Narcos, are depicted as highly intelligent individuals who pursue power through crime.

== Law ==
Mega-City One's laws are harsh, with many crimes not found in present-day law. Possession of sugar, for example, is illegal, as is the smoking of tobacco outside of licensed Smokatoriums, and coffee is banned as an illegal stimulant. The laws are enforced by the Judges, who are a combination of a judge and police officer. Ordinary laws are enforced more harshly than the present day, as a political choice to deal with the high crime rate. Most ordinary citizens are sent to the Iso-Cubes, tiny cells located within huge prisons. For example, one strip saw a citizen sentenced to a month in the iso-cubes for littering, while in another story a citizen was given 6 months for jaywalking. Judges impose immediate sentences on the spot, usually lengthy sentences of imprisonment (or "encubement"). In extreme cases, even the death penalty may be imposed, although relatively sparingly compared with the present day, and reserved for mass murder or the endangerment of the security of the city, but sometimes it is used simply to make an example or to intimidate the citizens. Nevertheless, many criminals are shot to death while resisting arrest, and resistors who survive Judge assault often receive a whole-life cube term.

The Judges themselves are not exempt from the law; in fact they are expected to obey it more strictly than any other. A violation that would earn a citizen a few months in an Iso-Cube would get a Judge a twenty-year sentence, served as hard labor on Saturn's moon, Titan, after surgical modification to enable the convict to survive outside without needing an expensive space suit. (Titan is a moon of Saturn in reality, but was located over Jupiter in an early Dredd strip.) When Judges do make a minor mistake (anything where the citizen is alive and not in an intensive care ward) such as wrongful arrest or search, they do have to pay the citizen a compensation fee if there are no crimes to be charged with. On that basis, if they can't find any evidence for the main charge, then they will look for any minor crime or misdemeanors to charge the citizen with to get themselves off the hook.

Firearm possession is only legal with the proper firearms permit, which is very hard to obtain. The only real exception is for Citidef units, which may use heavy weapons. (Since Block Mania the security on these is extreme and they are only issued during wartime.) In spite of this, many firearms are in circulation; some are sold on the black market while others are left over from the various invasions that have occurred over the past thirty years. Some families still possess twentieth-century handguns that have been handed down through the years. These are sometimes found by crime blitzes and will usually earn culprits the same penalty as a lasblaster from their time period.

Torture is normally illegal, but in extreme circumstances and with orders from the Chief Judge they employ it (both physical and psychological), for example when time is of the essence due to the city being in severe danger (or the Justice Department's authority is). They used that reason to torture Total War cell leaders, leading to the deaths of several of them. The Judges covered this up, "arresting" them by faking heart attacks, strokes or whatever was realistic or convenient at that time and then told their next of kin they had died, with this they could do whatever they wanted to them. They also used torture on the leading democrats before the democratic march, such as keeping an elderly democrat awake all night and then releasing him without charge, knowing he would have to march all day the following day and making severe threats to another involving his young children.

== Military ==
The original United States Armed Forces no longer exists: the explanation in "Origins" was that Chief Judge Goodman had built up the Judges until they were a match for the United States Army, as a precaution against President Booth. When Booth was overthrown after the Atomic Wars, the remains of the US Army were routed and finally destroyed in 2071's Battle of Armageddon. (In the immediate aftermath of the war, military discipline broke down and the Judges had to kill or arrest soldiers that were preying on the citizens.)

Mega-City One's military forces are inconsistently portrayed. During crises inside the city, regular Judges or Citi-Def are almost always shown doing the fighting instead and the military is usually mentioned in outer space – "Day of Chaos" eventually explained that they're unlicensed to act against the civilian population. From "The Cursed Earth" onwards, the city's armed forces have usually been presented as a branch of the Judges ("Judge-Troopers"): stories by Gordon Rennie introduced a Defence-Div, 1990s spin-off Maelstrom had heavily armed STAR (Strategic Target Attack Retaliation) Judges to carry out targeted strikes, and the Insurrection serials give the Special Judicial Service its own space fleet and armed force to stamp out rebellions. In contrast, stories by John Wagner have presented the military as a separate group, with some members believing the Judges are too lenient. Uniforms differ depending on the story. The STAR Judges were given an origin as founded in 2108 by Commander Brand, with Brand and his original squad secretly left to die after committing an act of genocide in 2111 (this was covered up as a legitimate act of war and the STARs turned into martyrs, allowing Mega-City One to still claim the devastated planet).

The main military force mentioned is the Space Corps, composed of marines and fleets, who fight against alien races that threaten the colonies. (When originally introduced in The Corps spinoff, they were Judges from the Academy of Law but in later stories these are recruited citizens.) Another force are the Genetic Infantry: genetically engineered men, bred in a lab to be dedicated soldiers. (The story Warzone had an ex-Genetic Infantry soldier who was a primitive version of the Genetic Infantry from Rogue Trooper.) The Citi-Defs (Citizen Defence) are a reserve force composed of citizens. Each city block contains a Citi-Def force in case of crises, though usually they turn up in Dredd as rogue factions waging block wars.

In very rare, desperate and often last stand scenarios the Justice Departments auxiliaries are issued weapons and fight alongside Judges, such as in the latter stages of both the Apocalypse War and Judgement Day.

Mega-City One also runs spy networks and a Black Ops Division of Judges. Under Judge Bachmann, their agents were brainwashed to worship the city as a god.

Following "Day of Chaos", the regular military (particularly the Space Corps) have been helping to keep order in Mega-City One. Tensions exists between them and the Judges. By 2136, following Chaos Day and a dual war with the Xhind/colonial insurgency, Mega-City One no longer had the military power to stop a rebellion on Titan.

== Crimes ==
Many crimes in Mega-City One are controlled by flamboyant mob bosses:

- Blitzers: hitmen with self-destruct bombs implanted inside them which detonate if they surrender when apprehended.
- Body-sharking: loaning money to people willing to put a loved one into cryonic storage for collateral.
- Chump-dumping: conning aliens into believing Earth is a paradise, taking their money, and then dumping them into space.
- Face changing crimes: the illicit use of face changing machines to commit crimes and fraud.
- Futsies: People who can no longer handle the fast pace of life begin to suffer from "Future Shock," become psychotic and begin to commit crimes.
- Numbers racket: buying computer passcodes for industrial theft.
- Organ leggers: those who cut up citizens and sell their organs on the black market.
- Perp running: transporting felons off-world.
- Psycos: telepathic protection rackets.
- Stookie glanding: butchering Stookies, an intelligent alien race, for the anti-aging drug they produce.
- Umpty-baggers: pushers of umpty, a candy that tastes so good it forms an instant psychological addiction.

== Leisure ==
Most work in Mega-City One is carried out by robots; this has led to problems with boredom and unemployment. Boredom has fostered many problems in the city, with citizens spending their leisure time rioting over jobs, experimenting on their neighbors, and running amok in the streets. Weird fads include Block Wars (wars between neighboring apartment blocks, waged by each block's defense militia), "ugliness clinics", and odd fashions.

Leisure in Mega-City One consists of a number of weird and wonderful futuristic hobbies and attractions, including:

- The Aggro Dome was conceived as a way for frustrated citizens to let off steam without endangering their fellow Meggers. Within the domes, citizens can vent their anger on robots, mock storefronts, and parked vehicles. Aggro Limited, the owners of the Aggro Dome franchise, petitioned for Judge replicoids to be added to a number of their buildings as a target for client retaliation. The request was promptly refused. After problems on opening day Dredd did his best to close the place for good but failed. Eventually the dome closed in the mid 2120s after visitor numbers fell too low to turn a profit.
- The Alien Zoos are ever-popular attractions, featuring the most bizarre creatures from the Milky Way galaxy and beyond.
- The Central Mega-City Library is open free of charge to the public and is the storehouse of information on Mega-City One and beyond, past and present. Late fees are very high.
- The Dream Palace is a popular leisure activity – for some, a growing necessity – and the ultimate in escapism. Customers are plugged into dream machines where their dreams are made real. Morpheus, Inc. own the original chain of dream palaces, but were unsuccessful in blocking the expansion of rival Dream Parlours, back street services utilizing reconditioned dream machines. Some parlours offer other "diversions" to supplement their income.
- The Mega-City Chamber of Horrors features robot replicas of history's most infamous villains.
- The Mega-City Museum is one of the tallest buildings in Mega-City One. It specializes in the history of Mega-City One, and is home to the most complete records of pre-atomic American civilization in North America. A transceiver beacon is sited atop the museum's roof, for use by the Justice Department.
- The Museum of Death focuses on murderers, warfare that resulted in mass death, and historical instruments of torture.
- The Palais-De-Boing is a chain of purpose-built structures designed for Boingers. Boinging is illegal outside of the Palais-De-Boing.
- The Smokatoriums are giant, stinking domes – the only locations within Mega-City One limits where it is legal to smoke tobacco and nicotine-related products.
- The White Cliffs of Dover were imported from a cash-starved Brit-Cit in the aftermath of the Atomic War. It remains a popular attraction even though it is nothing more than a crumbling pile of rock, chalk, and sand.
- Stookie is an illegal drug made from the glands of an intelligent alien species that stops its users' aging. Withdrawal from Stookie causes users to rapidly reach their 'real' ages. In one of the Judge Dredd novels, an injection of "pure, undiluted" Stookie causes the user to revert to a younger age.
- Sky surfing, where citizens use powered, floating surfboards to race and perform stunts.
- Batgliding, in which citizens don winged bat suits to fly on the thermals above Mega-City One.

== Transit systems ==
The high population density of Mega-City One requires a complex system of transport. This often serves as accommodation as well as a means of getting around the city.

=== Pedestrian ===
- Back street: Two-way passages, located in Old Town and City Bottom.
- Broad-Way: A large pedestrian plaza.
- Crossway: Any pedway intersection (a.k.a. Crosslink).
- Eeziglide: One-way pedestrian conveyance that functions as a human conveyor-belt.
- Pedway: Pedestrian-only walkway found right across the City at all levels. Subpeds are enclosed pedways that run under Pedways.
- Zipstrip: One or two-way pedestrian walkway that links blocks and smaller interchanges. Enclosed zipstrips are called Pipeways.

=== Vehicular ===
- Boomway: One or two-way multi-level Mega-Way (between four and ten lanes width, two to four levels height).
- Filter: One-way exit or entrance to and from parking areas.
- Flyover: Skedway that passes over a city block (a.k.a. Overzoom).
- Inter-Block Zoom: Maglev train-system which replaced the old Sky-Rail network in the late twenty-first century. Provides a link between all the city blocks in any given sector.
- Intersection: Road junction.
- Judge's Lane: Two-way road that runs parallel to major roadways, reserved for Justice Department usage.
- Median Strip: Protective barrier which prevents accidents in one half of a road from spreading to the other half.
- Mega Circular: Two-way, six-lane Meg-Way which bypasses through-sector traffic to benefit long-distance drivers.
- Meg-Way: Largest road design in Mega-City One. Two-way, between four and twenty lanes, and central reservation (a.k.a. Megaway, Speedway, Throughway, X-Pressway).
- Parkarama: Ground vehicle park.
- Podport: Hover vehicle park.
- Skedway: One-way highway, between one and five lanes. Interskeds connect one skedway to another (a.k.a. Feedway). Underskeds are single-lane roads, often reserved for public service traffic only, that pass underneath skeds. Overskeds are the same, but pass over skeds.
- Sky-Rail: Obsolete monorail public transit-system introduced in the early 21st century. One-third of Mega-City One still actively uses the Sky-Rail network while it awaits upgrading to the zoom-system. The largest Sky-Rail intersection in the City is Hell's Junction.
- Slipzoom: One-way, between one and four lanes, used for larger interchanges. An Underzoom (a.k.a. Flyunder) is a single-lane road often reserved for public service traffic only that passes under a Slipzoom.
- Superslab: The longest Meg-Way in Mega-City One, bisecting the City from north to south. Twenty-four lanes, 1,220 kilometers in length (a.k.a. Mega-City 500).
- Wayby: Small zones set aside Meg-Ways and Skedways in regular intervals where drivers can pull-off and temporarily park their vehicles.
- Zoomtube: The most recent traffic innovation in Mega-City One. An enclosed road-system where all traffic is platooned and computer-controlled for optimum speed and driver-safety.

== History ==
As Judge Dredd stories are set 122 years into the future and progress forward in 'real time' (stories from 1977 are set in 2099, and stories from the current year of 2026 are set in 2148), they have an extensive fictional chronology.

Stories in earlier issues would link Dredd to the chronology of the Invasion!, Ro-Busters, and Harlem Heroes strips: Mega-City One's construction is mentioned in Ro-Busters once it had moved to 2000 AD, and in a story that follows from Invasion!, while Mega-City One appears in Harlem Heroes and its lead character Giant is the father of Judge Giant. The former two strips have since been retconned out of Dredd history.

- Before 2027: By the late 2020s a conurbation stretches from New York to Washington DC in an attempt to contain the populace of the East Coast states. This will eventually become the first Mega-City, a new kind of urban development to house greater numbers of people. The development causes huge amounts of civil unrest and gang-related crime.
- 2027: An alliance of street gangs, led by the P Street Posse, storms the White House itself. Due to intimidation of the jury, no convictions occur. This incident will lead to the creation of the Judge System to police the country. Eustace Fargo is appointed Special Prosecutor for Street Crime by President Thomas Gurney.
- 2028: President Gurney re-elected due to his support for instant street justice.
- 2031: First deployment of the Judges in the United States, led by Chief Judge Fargo. Special centres train the new recruits, often hand-picked from the regular police, and old style judges have to undergo the new judge training program with the power to convict and sentence criminals on the spot.
- 2039: The success of Mega-City One inspires the creation of more Mega-Cities – Mega-City Two is planned to cover the Western seaboard and Texas City will cover Texas and other southern states. Other nations will follow.
- 2050: Earth is a mess of pollution, starvation, and wars. On June 3, Major Indira Knight, who developed America's orbital laser weapons, is the first human to leave the Solar System. The Harlem Heroes win the World Aeroball Championship.
- 2051: Fargo resigns and attempts suicide, but survives with serious injuries. He is secretly placed in suspended animation and his death is faked. Deputy Chief Judge Solomon becomes chief judge.
- 2052: Congress passes the Autonomy Act, giving extensive powers of self-government to the three American mega-cities. Each mega-city has its own chief judge: Solomon continues to serve as chief judge of Mega-City One.
- 2057: Deputy Chief Judge Goodman becomes chief judge and creates the Council of Five. Psi Division created.
- 2064: A new process of accelerated cloning, with DNA taken from senior Judges, is created by Morton Judd to quickly bolster Justice Department's ranks. Joe and Rico Dredd are two of the first clones from this process, growing to physiological age 5 in a matter of months.
- 2066: Six clones, including the Dredd twins, are inducted into the Academy of Law.
- 2068: Vice President Robert L. Booth is elected president, gaining support under the line that the rest of the world was living off America's backs. (It later emerges that he rigged the election.)
- 2069: International relations are soured when Booth sends troops to seize control of foreign oil reserves in the Middle East. This will later be considered part of World War Three between "Western Capitalist Nations" and Arab states but Brit-Cit is the only European state not to condemn it.
- 2070: President Booth starts the Atomic Wars on June 12, 2070 to mass public support; this comes as the senior judges are discussing whether to confront him. Despite Booth's promises, America's nuclear screens fail to keep out many of the retaliatory strikes. Most of the planet is devastated in a nuclear holocaust, and the world's Mega-Cities are among the few to survive relatively unscathed due to experimental laser defences. All Judges and the military are deployed to maintain order in the decaying society, with the Judges forced to constantly fight against soldiers for committing criminal acts. It is discovered that Booth rigged the election and killed a witness to conceal the crime. Shocked and betrayed, the citizens of America rise up against the government and call for the Judges to take over the country. Fargo, secretly reawoken from suspended animation, advises Goodman to take over as ruler of the United States in a coup. Booth is sentenced to 100 years in suspended animation, but has enough loyal followers and robotic Mek-troops to fight a civil war against the Judges until 2071.
- 2071: The Battle of Armageddon. At the heart of the Cursed Earth, near Mega-City Two, Booth's army is finally defeated at the cost of the lives of one hundred thousand judges and troopers. The Hiroshima Accord is settled by the various global Mega-Cities.
- 2070+: Massive inflow of homeless refugees from the Cursed Earth pour into the Mega-Cities, causing a massive amount of block construction. Space is becoming even tighter. Genetic apartheid laws are soon brought in to keep mutants out of Mega-City One: officially this is because the mutants are irrationally violent against "norms", and to protect the gene pool from contamination.
- 2077–78: Mega-City One citizens are still running water through geiger counters. A desire for decadence causes the bloody new deathsport inferno to take the world by storm. The Harlem Heroes reform as the Harlem Hellcats. When the Hellcats refuse to work with the gambling syndicates, they're forced to play to the death against robots; the brutality of the '78 Hellcats Murders leads to scared fans leaving and a judicial crackdown that destroys the sport.
- 2080: The Mega-City 5000 bike race is banned when the Mutant and Spacer gangs start killing each other mid-race. (It will continue illegally until 2100) The first competitive eating contests begin.
- 2083–86: Civil war breaks out between Mega-City One and Texas City, the latter feeling it is being dominated by the other Mega-Cities while MC-One and Two oppose its secession in the interests of unity and the highly valuable resources Texas owns. The war leads to years of stalemate, and Mega-City One decides the conflict is pointless and allows Texas to secede. Note: this event was possibly retconned by the story Origins.
- 2088: Establishment of Luna-1, a moon-based Mega-City, by all three American Mega-Cities to renew and cement relations between them. Government of the colony is divided initially between all three cities, with a senior judge being sent every six months to take over as Judge-Marshal.
- 2089: The first instance of Future Shock Syndrome or "futsie".
- 2095: Chief Judge Goodman announces a policy of mass interstellar colonisation, as post-war Earth is low on resources. A decadent youth culture has built up around drugs, the pinstripe sound, and illegal comics.
- 2099: Population is now over 800 million. Chief Judge Goodman, possessed by a malevolent psychic mutant called the Monkey, is forced to undermine the stability of the city to have it descend into anarchy; Judge Dredd takes the Monkey out. The Statue of Judgement is erected in honour of the Judges. Renegade droid Call-Me-Kenneth starts the highly destructive First Robot War, devastating large areas of the city. Judge Dredd becomes the last Judge-Marshal of Luna-1 to serve a six-month tour of duty: Judge Tex succeeds him as permanent Marshal of Luna-1.
- 2101: Deputy Chief Judge Cal, head of the Special Judicial Squad, has Goodman assassinated and assumes control. He brainwashes most of the Judges into obeying him, brings in alien Kleggs as mercenaries, and implements increasingly insane and dictatorial rules – twice sentencing the entire city to death. Judge Dredd leads a rebellion against him and eventually succeeds, with resistance member Judge Griffin taking over as chief judge. Under Cal, a vast wall has been built around Mega-City One. The powerful mutant Father Earth leads a massed attack on Mega-City One, destroying Power Tower (a controlled volcano) and unleashing a flood of lava, before being stopped. A few months later, an invasion of mutant spiders leads to the burning of entire sectors.
- 2102: Judge Death arrives in Mega-City One and kills dozens before he is captured. The dying Psi-Judge Feyy predicts an apocalypse will occur in 2120 that can only be averted if a figure known as the Judge Child, who will become Chief Judge, can be found; Judge Dredd leads a mission to retrieve the Child, only to determine him to be evil and leave him stranded on an alien world.
- 2103: The Soviet block of East-Meg One, using robotic pirate Captain Skank as a proxy, secretly seize control of Mega-City One nuclear weapons and launch an attack on the city, destroying several sectors; after being caught, they nuke one of their own sectors as compensation. Judge Death is freed by the other Dark Judges; they go on a killing spree in Billy Carter Block before their physical forms are destroyed.
- 2104: Orlok the Assassin drugs the city water supply, increasing the aggression of the population and leading to block wars springing up across the entire city – which turns out to have just been a diversion. With the Judges tied up with the Block Mania, the Sov Judges of East-Meg One launch the Apocalypse War. A coordinated attack shatters Mega-City One's defences, leaves multiple blocks destroyed by nuclear weaponry (the south of the city faces "total nuke out!" killing 150 million), and leads to a massed invasion by Sov forces. A bitter resistance is put up by Judges and Citizen-Defence units, despite heavy losses and the death (after being brainwashed into a Sov agent) of Chief Judge Griffin. Victory is achieved when a team led by Dredd causes the nuclear devastation of the entire East-Meg One. Judge McGruder becomes the new chief judge and oversees the rebuilding of the devastated city.
- 2107: A time travel mission is deployed to 2120 to determine the truth of Feyy's death-bed prediction. The Mega-City One of the future is discovered to be devastated and ruled by demonic creatures (including a zombie Judge Dredd) under a mutated form of the Judge Child – now revealed to be responsible for the great disaster. The Judges take action to ensure this future is averted. Later the Dark Judges gain physical form again and, using personal teleporters, cause massacres across the city – even in the Grand Hall of Justice – without being stopped. They are eventually defeated and trapped in dimensional limbo.
- 2108: Shojun the Warlord unleashes the demonic Seven Samurai on Mega-City One, killing thousands – including the head of Psi-Division. McGruder steps down and is replaced by Judge Silver. Pro-democracy activists take over a TV station and are executed live on air by Dredd.
- 2109: Under Silver's orders, Dredd leads the Judges in a dirty-tricks operation to undermine the upcoming Democratic March – including having Wally Squad (undercover) Judges in the crowd provoke a riot, so the Judges have an excuse to go in and use violence while seemingly having the moral high ground.
- 2110: Morton Judd and his Judge-clones – the Judda – launch an attack on the Hall of Justice. They are defeated and their base in the Oz Radback is destroyed. A Dredd-clone named Kraken survives and is eventually turned into a Mega-City Judge.
- 2112: Fortean manifestations occur in the city and across the globe, as the subterranean Deros attempt to invade; an East Meg 2/MC1 Psi team stops them. Dredd resigns and takes the Long Walk, following doubts about the Judge System caused both by Kraken and his role in breaking up the Democratic March. Silver covers up Dredd's retirement and Kraken assumes Dredd's place. While in the Cursed Earth, Dredd is injured and rendered amnesiac by the Sisters of Death. Meanwhile, the Sisters of Death are able to psychically influence Kraken into helping them cross over into Mega-City One and to free the Dark Judges from limbo. The city is turned into a Necropolis – the Judges are under psychic control, with Silver abandoning his post and being turned into a zombie for Death's amusement; decay, disease, starvation and suicide are rampant; and the Dark Judges hold daily cullings. A handful of judges who escaped brainwashing, including Dredd and McGruder returned from their Long Walks, are able to banish the Sisters, execute Kraken and capture the Dark Judges (except Death), but not before 60 million citizens have been killed. McGruder assumes the post of Chief Judge again, but without a Council of Five. The Hunters Club organises the sponsored charity massacre "Death Aid" for Necropolis orphans. The anonymous figure later known as Tempest takes covert control of Mega-City One's criminal underworld.
- 2113: Under Dredd's urging, a referendum is held where the citizens will vote whether or not, following the failure of the Judges to stop Necropolis, to bring back democracy. Judge Grice and others attempt to assassinate Dredd to stop this, and are arrested. The citizens, as Dredd anticipated, vote to keep the Judges – those few that can be bothered to vote. The undead Silver tries to reassume command but is executed for dereliction of duty.
- 2114: Judgement Day – the time-travelling Sabbat the Necromagus unleashes zombies upon every Mega-City on Earth. An international coalition of Judges is sent to take him out, but not before five entire Mega-Cities have been nuked when it appears they're lost to the zombies. The final death toll is three billion. Following the loss of many Judges to the zombies, McGruder instigates the Mechanismo project – robot Judges – to the outrage of many Senior Judges, as it becomes clear she is increasingly senile and unstable.
- 2115: Grice breaks out of the Titan penal colony and takes over the city by infecting the population with the deadly Meat Virus, incapacitating many Judges. After much random death and destruction, including the destruction of the Statue of Judgement, Grice is defeated. Dredd deliberately sabotages the Mechanismo project.
- 2116: A gathering of Senior Judges attempt to make McGruder step down but to no avail. After her pet Mechanismo project goes wrong and a rogue Mechanismo robot tries to kill her, she finally steps down from office. An election is held among the Judges and Judge Volt becomes the new chief judge.
- 2117: Satan emerges from the fallen Icarus asteroid, shrugs off every Justice Department attack and threatens to destroy the city; Psi-Judge Anderson barely defeats him.
- 2118: Judicial crackdown on the Frendz crime syndicate in Sector 301 leads to major retaliation, with heavy rioting and gang violence that puts the Sector's judges in a retreat. After a siege at Traffic Station Alamo, the battle is won by the Judges. McGruder dies in battle in the Cursed Earth (rather than compulsory euthanasia). Mega-City One briefly attacked by dune sharks.
- 2121: Fifteen million children depart the city for an underground haven in the Cursed Earth. Crime lord Nero Narcos triggers the Mark II Lawgivers to self-destruct and then starts the Second Robot War. The Judges are briefly overthrown before Dredd, with help from Brit-Cit, reprograms Narcos' robot reinforcements to turn on their comrades and the Judges are able to retake control. Judge Volt commits suicide over the event, which is hushed up; Judge Hershey becomes the new chief judge.
- 2123: An army composed of perps from parallel universes, led by an alter-dimensional Judge Cal, invade Mega-City One. Mega-City One, Brit-Cit, and Hondo ally to prevent a partnership between East-Meg Two and the alien Lawlords, an obvious first step in a Lawlord conquest of Earth.
- 2124: Orlok captured, but not before releasing a virus that kills tens of thousands of citizens. Judge Death escapes confinement.
- 2125: Mutant terrorist Mr Bones attacks the Hall of Justice with a hostile alien species. Orlok put on trial and then executed on live TV.
- 2126: Terrorist group Total War triggers multiple nuclear bombs, resulting in the deaths of four million people.
- 2127: Hundreds of thousands of citizens have been left homeless by the bombings, and live in overcrowded, crime-ridden emergency camps. The Half-Life plague, spread by a traitor in Psi Division, spreads a wave of murderous violence that eventually kills one million people. The Sisters of Death launch another attack, with entire blocks being wiped out by plagues and poltergeist activity.
- 2128: Mega-City One leads a peacekeeping mission to Ciudad Barranquilla during a civil war; this turns out to be a pretense for regime change, putting in a new Supreme Judge that they can control.
- 2129: Death of Judge Fargo. A portal opens to the dark-matter composed fifth dimension Kaluza; demonic creatures invade the city, slaughtering whole sectors and causing crime-increasing psychic backlash until the Judges invaded Kaluza and shut the portal down. Thirty city-blocks designed by Findhorn Gask turn out to secretly be giant robots, which come to life and rampage through the city, before being convinced to stop and turned into a satellite city. Council of Five discusses and rejects a proposal by Dredd to end the mutant ban; rejection followed by a massive crackdown by Dredd on the city's Mutant Farm facilities. Attempted coup by Space Corps veterans under General Vincent. Serial killer PJ Maybe, under a false identity, becomes Mayor of Mega-City One.
- 2130: The anti-mutant laws are discussed again due to pressure from Dredd and repealed out of fear he will resign otherwise; there is widespread rioting by citizens as a result, followed by frequent hate crimes against mutant migrants.
- 2131: Events and disasters from the Bible devastate the Low Life. Senior judges, against the mutant rights laws, force a vote on replacing Hershey as chief judge in the hope of undoing the changes. Judge Francisco becomes chief judge, and the entire Council of Five is replaced. The decision is made to build townships for mutants, and Dredd is exiled to them. The townships will use mutants as Deputies and allow trial-by-jury. Subtle conflict exists between Francisco and his Council.
- 2132: Deputy Chief Judge Sinfield usurps Francisco using brainwashing drugs and becomes acting chief judge. Laws become even harsher for mutants. PJ Maybe attempts to assassinate Sinfield, hospitalising him, and his identity is discovered by the Judges. Sinfield is arrested and Francisco returns to office. MC-1 covertly deploys psychic weapons in Sino-Cit territory, testing how they can handle psi-warfare. After a vicious war with corrupt Judges, the Hondo yakuza take over the Low Life's criminal underworld.
- 2133: Francisco attempts to balance the budget with various cost-cutting measures, with the buzzword "the Big Community". A nuclear bomb is detonated in Sector 17, killing half a million people. The Low Life's Judges, particularly the Wally Squad, are purged due to criminal infiltration. The Black Ops Division under Judge Bachmann quietly assassinates the Township Chief Judge of mutant Township Three and his deputies, in order to put a less liberal Judge in charge. New elections for Mayor are held, with several candidates killed by an escaped Maybe; East-Meg agents capture a prominent biologist and prepare to unleash the "Chaos Bug" bio-weapon on the city.
- 2134: The Chaos Bug is released, in conjunction with multiple terrorist assaults and Sov sabotage – foreign allies only send robots due to fear of infection. Most of the Academy of Law and Public Surveillance are killed (and the Statue of Judgement destroyed); the Dark Judges temporarily escape. A (rejected) proposal to simply murder the infected is made public, sparking a vast uprising that devastates the city and allows the Bug to spread; an overwhelmed Justice Department is forced to genuinely murder the infected and only wins against the uprising because the smoke from burning blocks drives insurgents off the streets. By the time the virus dies out, 350 million citizens and 60% of the judges are dead; Justice Department is near collapse, bolstered by a 40,000 strong mutant army from the Cursed Earth townships. Francisco resigns and Hershey forms an interim government. The economy has collapsed and welfare ends; Space Corps Marines are recalled to the city to help restore order but are soon at odds with both Judges and citizens after trying to airstrike a rebellious block. Judge Bachmann attempts a coup, in which many judges and citizens are killed; it is prevented in part by a returning Judge Smiley, founder of Black Ops.
- 2135: After a trial attack on Gateway colony, the alien Xhind launch an invasion of human space; the war lasts sixteen weeks. The Battle of 43 Rega is Mega-City One's one chance to stop the Xhind reaching the Inner Colonies and relies on a peace deal with Luther's rebel forces; immediately after victory, MC-1 forces massacre the rebels.
- 2136: Under ex-Judge Aimee Nixon, the Titan convicts revolt and leave to form an independent colony on Enceladus; the weaker MC-1 is forced to accept this. Justice Department is exposed as having 24/7 surveillance in all of the newly built city blocks and suspend the program after widespread riots (the journalist who broke the story is later 'murdered'). The alien Lawlords take control of the 2050s orbital lasers and declare rule over Mega-City One, but are beaten back.
- 2137: By October 2137 the population stands at seventy two million and is growing rapidly. However the destruction of the Academy of Law during Chaos Day has disrupted the supply of cadets, and it is all the remaining judges can do to cope with the expanding population as it will be years before replacement of losses is reliable again.
- 2138: Texas City attempts to take over Mega-City One in a coup, but is thwarted by Judge Dredd and others.
- 2139: Mega City Population estimated at 100 million citizens.
- 2140: Late in the year Dredd discovers the involvement of Judge Smiley in the events that led up to the Apocalypse War. With assistance from other Judges, Dredd ambushes and kills Smiley on the west wall.
- 2141: Continuing return of those who fled the city and the discovery that the initial death toll from Chaos day had been overestimated sees the city's population return to 130 million. Chief Judge Hershey announces her intention to leave the role for the second time and nominates Judge Logan to succeed her in the subsequent election. After appointing a Mechanismo robot to the Council of Five there was an attempted coup against him by former council members. Intervention by Dredd lead to the conspirators surrendering and being detained.

== Other cities mentioned in Judge Dredd ==
The first mention of other megacities came in Robot Wars, with a Texas City Oil freighter. In the later Luna 1, when Dredd was appointed Judge-Marshall of the Luna-1 colony, the narration states that the colony is run by "the 3 great cities of North America" of which one is Texas City in the next issue. The First Luna Olympics would introduce "the Sov-Cities". Mega-City Two on the West coast was introduced in the story The Cursed Earth (1978). Since then, the exact number, location, nature, and even name of megacities fluctuates depending on the writer and strip.

== In other media ==
=== Film ===
Mega-City One is the initial setting of the 1995 film, though the majority of the second act shifts to Cursed Earth and the outer walls. Nigel Phelps was the production designer that oversaw the design of the city, chosen because he previously designed the fantastical version of Gotham City for Tim Burton's Batman. Other illustrators that contributed designs for the city included Simon Murton and Matt Codd.

Mega-City One is the setting of the 2012 film Dredd, though it occupies a smaller area than described in the comics. According to Judge Dredd (Karl Urban), the boundaries of Mega-City One reach "from Boston to Washington D.C." (similar to the real-life concept of the Northeast megalopolis) and contains a population of 800 million. The city blocks are large, brutalist structures that tend to be slum areas; each block can seal itself off with blast shields and communications blackouts in case of war. Technology is much less advanced (outside of Justice Department equipment) and all non-Judge vehicles resemble early-21st-century models.

=== TV ===
Judge Dredd: Mega City One is a TV series that was announced as in development on 10 May 2017. The population of the city in the TV series is advertised as "four hundred million citizens".

== Sources ==
- "The A–Z of Judge Dredd," by Mike Butcher (Hamlyn, 1995). (ISBN 978-0600584087)
