= List of metahumans in DC Comics =

In DC Universe, a metahuman is a character with superpowers. This is a list of metahumans that have appeared in comic book titles published by DC Comics, as well as properties from other media are listed below, with appropriately brief descriptions and accompanying citations.

== A ==
- Air Wave (Harold Jordan)
- Alexander Luthor Jr.
- Amazing Man
- Amygdala
- Anima
- Anthony Ivo
- Aquagirl (Lorena Marquez)
- Argus (Nick Kelly)
- Atom (Al Pratt)
- Atomic Skull
- Atom Smasher (Albert Rothstein)
- Argent

== B ==
- Ballistic (Kelvin Mao)
- Bane
- Baron Bedlam
- Battalion
- Beast Boy (Garfield Mark Logan)
- Black Canary (Dinah Laurel Lance)
- Black Condor (Richard Grey Jr.)
- Black Condor (Ryan Kendall)
- Black Condor (John Trujillo)
- Black Lightning
- Manchester Black
- Blight
- Blimp (member of the Inferior Five)
- Blindside (member of Relative Heroes)
- Brahma (member of the Supermen of America)
- Brainwave (Henry King, Sr.)
- Brainwave (Henry King, Jr.)
- Brick
- Bumblebee (Karen Beecher-Duncan)
- Blackout

== C ==
- Captain Atom
- Captain Boomerang (Owen Mercer)
- Captain Comet
- Casey Krinsky
- Catwoman (Patience Phillips)
- Celsius
- Centrix
- Cameron Chase
- Cheetah
- Chunk
- Cicada
- Clock King (member of the Terror Titans)
- Codename: Assassin
- Coldcast
- Coldsnap
- Count Vertigo
- Crazy Jane
- Cyclone
- Cyclotron
- Ned Creegan

== D ==
- Damage
- Dan the Dyna-Mite
- Deadline
- Deathbolt
- Deathstroke
- Deep Blue (daughter of Tsunami)
- Diamondette (member of Hero Hotline)
- Doctor Alchemy
- Doctor Double X
- Doctor Fate (Khalid Nassour)
- Doctor Light (Arthur Light)
- Doctor Light (Kimiyo Hoshi)
- Doctor Manhattan
- Doctor Mid-Nite (Beth Chapel)
- Doctor Mid-Nite (Charles McNider)
- Doctor Mid-Nite (Pieter Cross)
- Doctor Phosphorus
- Doctor Polaris
- Doctor Psycho
- Doll Girl
- Doll Man (Darrell Dane)
- Doll Man (Lester Colt)
- Dolphin
- Dumb Bunny (member of the Inferior Five)
- Dust Devil (member of the Blasters)

== E ==
- Earthworm
- Edge (a New Blood)
- El Dorado
- Elasti-Girl
- Electrocutioner
- Elephant Man
- Elongated Man

== F ==
- Fastball
- Father Time
- Fever (member of the Doom Patrol)
- Fire
- Firebird (member of Soyuz)
- Firebrand
- Firehawk
- Firestorm (Ronnie Raymond)
- Firestorm (Jason Rusch)
- The Flash (Barry Allen)
- The Flash (Bart Allen)
- The Flash (Jay Garrick)
- The Flash (Wally West)
- Flex Mentallo
- Floronic Man
- Fog
- Freedom Beast
- Frostbite (member of Young Heroes in Love)
- Fallout

== G ==
- Gehenna
- Geist
- Gemini
- Geo-Force
- Geomancer
- Giganta
- Gloss
- Godiva
- Goldface
- Goldilocks
- Goraiko (member of the International Ultramarine Corps)
- Gorgon
- Green Arrow (Conner Hawke)
- Green Lantern (Alan Scott)
- Gunfire
- Gypsy

== H ==
- Halo
- Hector Hammond
- Harbinger
- Harley Quinn
- Hardrock (ally of Superboy)
- Harpi (member of the Hybrid)
- Hazard
- Heatstroke (member of the Masters of Disaster)
- Hellgrammite
- Hitman
- Hourman (Rex Tyler)
- Hourman (Rick Tyler)
- Human Bomb
- Hypnota
- Hot Spot (Isaiah Crockett)

== I ==
- Icemaiden (alias Sigrid Nansen)
- Icicle (Cameron Mahkent)
- Inertia
- I.Q.
- Iron Munro

== J ==
- Jack B. Quick
- Jaculi (member of Onslaught)
- Jade
- Jamm (a New Blood)
- Jericho
- Jesse Quick (Jesse Chambers)
- Jet
- Jinx
- Johnny Quick (Johnny Chambers)
- Josiah Power
- Judomaster

== K ==
- Key
- Kid Flash
- Killer Croc
- Killer Frost
- Killer Wasp
- Killowat
- King Shark
- Kole
- Kong Kenan
- Kryptonite Man
- Kung

== L ==
- Lady Clay
- Lady Liberty
- Lady Quark
- Lady Spellbinder
- Lightning
- Lilith Clay
- Lion-Mane
- Livewire
- Looker

== M ==
- Madame Rouge
- Magenta
- Magno (Quality Comics)
- Magno (Modern Age)
- Major Disaster
- Mammoth
- Man-Bat
- Manfred Mota
- Manticore
- Más y Menos
- Matter Master
- Maxi-Man
- Maxwell Lord
- Max Mercury
- Mento
- Metamorpho
- Mind-Grabber Kid
- Mirage
- Mirror Master
- Miss America
- Mist
- Mister 104
- Mister Bones
- Mister Element
- Mister Freeze
- Mister Nobody
- Molecule
- Multi-Man
- Multiplex
- Mystek

== N ==
- Naiad
- Negative Man (Ted Bruder)
- Nemesis Kid
- Neon the Unknown
- Neptune Perkins
- Neutron
- Nimbus
- Northwind

== O ==
- Obsidian
- Offspring
- Orca
- Outburst
- Overthrow
- Owlwoman

== P ==
- Paragon
- Peek-A-Boo
- Penny Dreadful
- Phantasm (Danny Chase)
- Phobia
- Plasmus
- Plastic Man
- Plastique
- Poison Ivy
- Pozhar
- Professor Zoom
- Psi
- Psimon
- Power Girl
- Parasite

== R ==
- Rampage
- Ray (Ray Terrill)
- Reactron
- Red King
- Red Star
- Red Trinity (team)
- Redwing
- Resurrection Man
- Reverse-Flash
- Rising Sun
- Rhea Jones (alias Lodestone)
- Rose Wilson

== S ==
- Sand (formerly Sandy the Golden Boy)
- Sapphire
- Scarecrow
- Silver Banshee
- Savitar
- Scandal Savage
- Scorch
- Shimmer
- Shining Knight (Justin Arthur)
- Silent Majority
- Sister Superior
- Snapper Carr
- Sonar
- Soyuz (team)
- Sparkler
- Sparx
- Dorothy Spinner
- Stalnoivolk
- Static
- Steel (John Henry Irons)
- Striker Z

== T ==
- Tao Jones
- Tar Pit
- Tasmanian Devil
- Tempest (Garth)
- Tempest (Joshua Clay)
- Ten-Eyed Man
- Terra
- Troia (Donna Troy)
- Thorn
- Thunder
- Thunderlord
- Thunder and Lightning
- TNT
- Tobias Whale
- Tokamak
- Tomorrow Woman (post-Trinity)
- Top
- Triumph
- Tsunami
- Tuatara
- Typhoon
- Tyroc

== V ==
- Vandal Savage
- Vibe
- Volcana
- Vox (Mal Duncan)
- Vulcan
- Vixen

== W ==
- Warp
- Weather Wizard
- Wildcat (Yolanda Montez)
- Wildcat (Tom Bronson)
- Windfall
- Windshear
- Wonder Girl (Cassie Sandsmark)
- Wonder Woman

== X ==
- XS

== Z ==
- Zookeeper (Samuel Register)
- Zyklon
