= Justice League Quarterly =

US comic book series

Publication information
- Publisher: DC Comics
- Schedule: Quarterly
- Format: Ongoing series
- Publication date: 1990 – 1994
- No. of issues: 17
- Main character: Justice League

Creative team
- Created by: Keith Giffen; J. M. DeMatteis
- Written by: various
- Artist: various

Justice League Quarterly (JLQ) was a quarterly American comic book series published by DC Comics from Winter 1990 to Winter 1994; it lasted 17 issues. It had a variable cast, pulling from the Justice League membership. The title centred on short stories featuring a differing number of characters, often solo stories, and in later issues often featured a pin-up section of members of the Justice League. Various writers and artists worked on the title.

== Featured characters (by frequency of appearance) ==
=== Five or more issues ===
- Blue Beetle (Ted Kord)
- Booster Gold
- Crimson Fox
- Elongated Man
- Fire
- Flash (Wally West)
- Guy Gardner
- Ice
- Martian Manhunter
- Maxwell Lord
- Power Girl

=== Up to five issues ===
- Batman
- Bloodwynd (Martian Manhunter)
- Blue Jay
- Bushmaster
- Captain Atom
- Doctor Light (Kimiyo Hoshi)
- Doctor Mist
- Echo (IV)
- General Glory (Joseph Jones)
- Godiva
- Green Lantern (Hal Jordan)
- Impala
- Jack O'Lantern (Marvin Noronsa)
- Jack O'Lantern (Liam McHugh)
- Kilowog
- L-Ron
- Maxima
- Metamorpho
- Oberon
- Olympian
- Owlwoman
- Ray (Ray Terrill)
- Rising Sun
- Rocket Red
- Seraph
- Silver Sorceress
- Sue Dibny
- Tasmanian Devil
- Thunderbolt
- Thunderlord
- Tuatara
- Wild Huntsman

=== Single issue ===
- Arion
- Aquaman
- Big Sir
- Black Canary (Dinah Lance)
- Cascade
- Centrix
- Chaon
- Chrysalis
- Clock King
- Cluemaster
- Dr. Light (Kimiyo Hoshi)
- Flash (Barry Allen)
- General Glory
- Gentleman Ghost
- Geo-Force
- G'nort
- Gypsy
- Hardline
- High Abbot
- Jesse Quick
- Judomaster (Andreas Havoc)
- Major Disaster
- Maxi-Man
- Mighty Bruce
- Mister Miracle (Scott Free)
- Multi-Man
- Nightshade
- Nuklon
- Rebis
- Red Star
- Reverb
- Sarge Steel
- Scarlet Skier
- Starman
- Superman
- Templar
- Tundra
- Ultraa
- Valor
- Vapor
- Warrior (Guy Gardner)
- Wonder Woman

== See also ==
- Justice League
- Justice League International
- Justice League Europe
