= African characters in comics =

Characters native to the African continent have been depicted in comics since the beginnings of the modern comic strip. Initially, such early 20th-century newspaper comics as Winsor McCay's Little Nemo depicted the racist stereotype of a spear-carrying cannibal, a comedic convention of the time. African characters later began to appear as another stereotype, the "noble savage"—a similar progression to that of depictions of Native Americans—and eventually as standard human beings.

== History ==
=== American comics ===
In the early years of comic strips and comic books, supposedly humorous racial and ethnic stereotypes were a mainstay of the medium, as they were of most American popular entertainment. Black people were almost always shown as foolish, cowardly, and addicted to gambling. Even in serious comic strips, as late as the 1950s Black characters were drawn with bulging eyes and fat lips.

In 1920, the humorous strip Bungleton Green was created by Leslie Rogers for the Chicago Defender, one of the most influential Black newspapers in the country. The strip ran until 1968, undergoing a remarkable transformation: in the 1940s, cartoonist Jay Jackson reinvented it as a science fiction time-travel adventure strip.

The first major Black character in the comics was in Cartoonist Lee Falk's adventure comic strip Mandrake the Magician, which featured the African supporting character Lothar from its 1934 debut on. He was a former "Prince of the Seven Nations", a federation of jungle tribes, but passed on the chance to become king and instead followed Mandrake on his world travels, fighting crime. He is often referred to as the strongest man in the world. Initially an 'illiterate exotic dressed in animal skins who provided brawn to complement Mandrake's brain on their adventures,' he was modernized in 1965 to dress in suits and speak standard English.

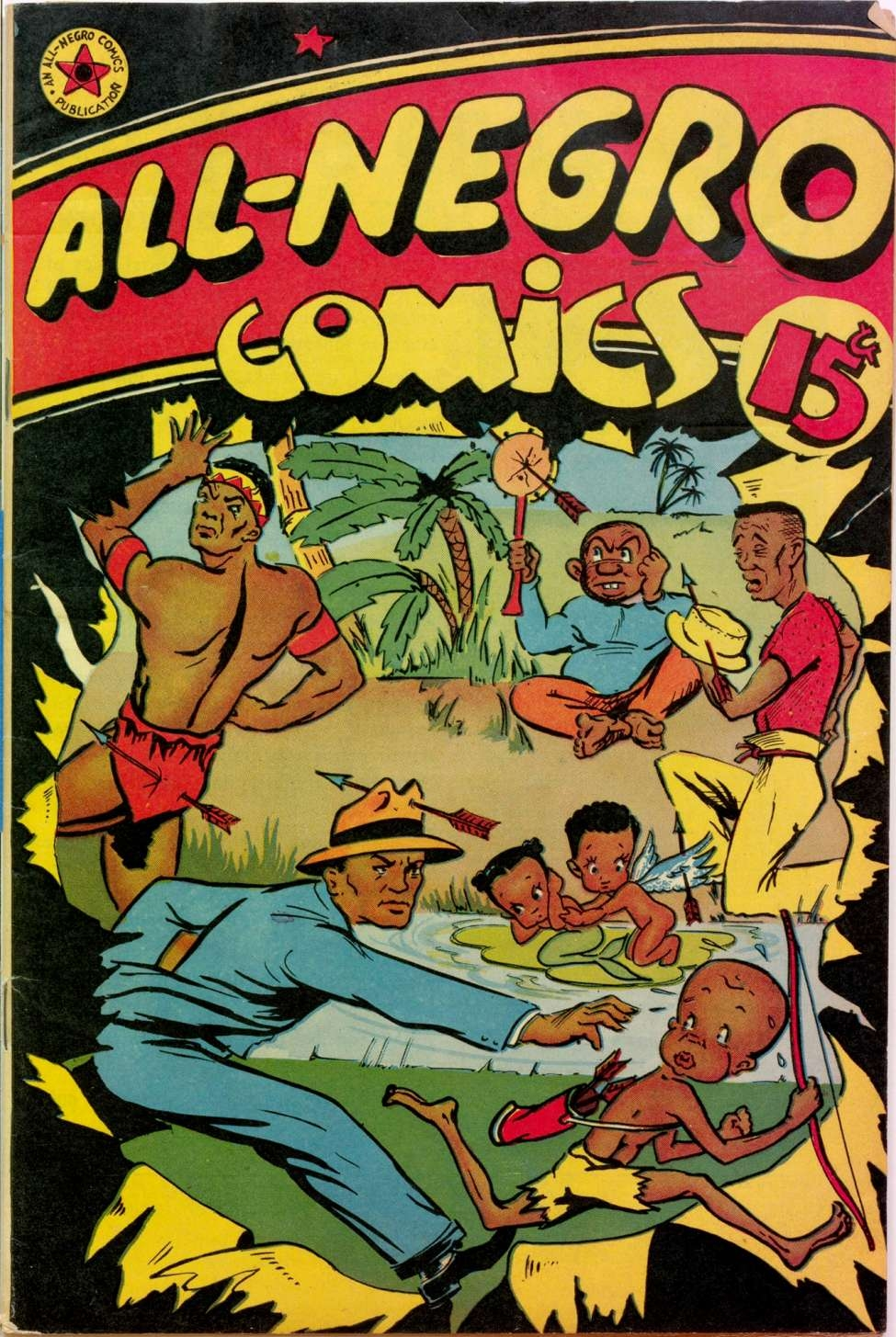
All-Negro Comics #1 (June 1947). Cover artist unknown.

The publisher All-Negro Comics, Inc. published a single issue of All-Negro Comics (June 1947), a 15-cent omnibus, at a time when comics generally cost a dime, starring characters that included Lion Man. Lion Man is a young African scientist sent by the United Nations to oversee a massive uranium deposit at the African Gold Coast. Wearing a loin cloth and tribal headband, he is joined by a young war orphan named Bubba, and fights the villainous Doctor Blut Sangro.

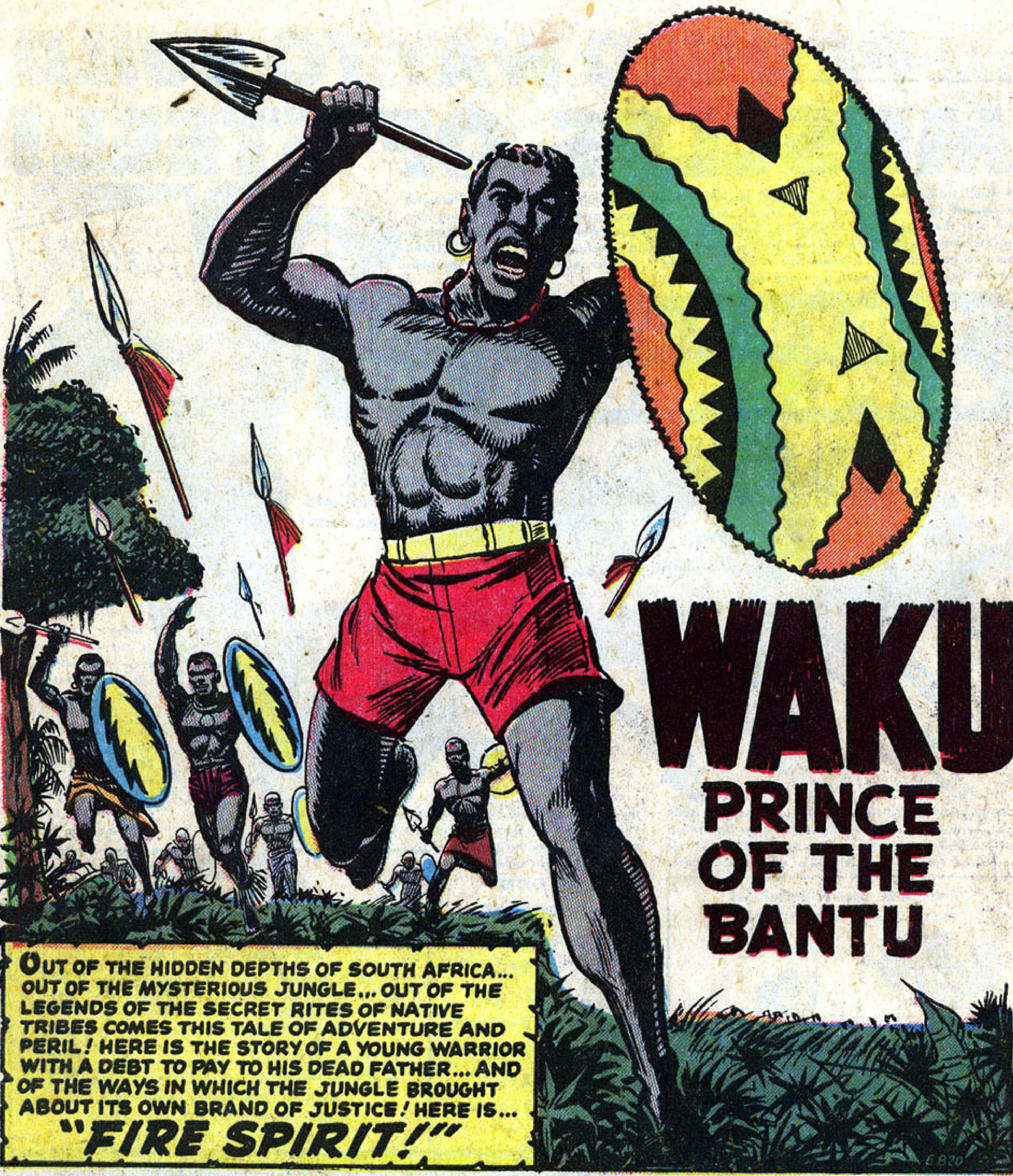

Waku, Prince of the Bantu in Jungle Tales #1 (September 1954) art by Ogden Whitney

It was not until Waku, Prince of the Bantu, in the omnibus Jungle Tales from Marvel Comics' 1950s predecessor Atlas Comics, that mainstream comic books depicted an African character as a strong, independent hero. Waku was an African chieftain in a feature with no regularly featured white characters.

The first known Black superhero in mainstream American comic books is Marvel's the Black Panther, an African who first appeared in Fantastic Four #52 (July 1966). This was followed by the first African-American superhero in mainstream comics, the Falcon, introduced in Captain America #117 (Sept. 1969). DC's first African-American superhero was Sgt. Willie Walker, a.k.a. Black Racer of the New Gods, introduced in writer-artist Jack Kirby's New Gods #3 (July 1971). Marvel's first major African female character was the superhero Storm.

=== African comics ===
The series Powerman, designed as an educational tool, was published in 1975 by Bardon Press Features of London, England, for distribution in Nigeria. The series, starring Powerman, was written by Don Avenall (aka Donne Avenell) and Norman Worker, and illustrated by Dave Gibbons and Brian Bolland. In 1988, Acme Press republished the series in the UK for the first time, to capitalize on the popularity of the artists, both of whose careers had since taken off. Acme changed Powerman's name to Powerbolt, to avoid confusion with the character Luke Cage, published by Marvel Comics. Powerman, who was super-strong and could fly, appeared in stories rendered in a simple style reminiscent of Fawcett Comics' Golden Age Captain Marvel. His only apparent weakness was snakebite.

Jet Jungle and his black panther Jupiter starred in one of the longest running radio plays and comic strips in South Africa, from 1965 to 1985. Progressive for his time, Jet Jungle appealed to children across the spectrum but never succeeded in breaking out of the stranglehold of economic sanctions and a cultural boycott caused as a result of the racist policies of the government of the day. Nevertheless, he can be credited with inspiring a generation of naturalists and environmentalists to save the rain-forests and jungles of Africa.

In November 2005, Nelson Mandela announced that the comic book A Son of the Eastern Cape would provide an illustrated history of Mandela's formative years, starting with his birth. The opening panels show Mandela as a swaddled baby in his parents' arms in their mud hut in the village of Mwezo, near Qunu in the Eastern Cape. The graphic novel was made up of 8 volumes, written and illustrated by Nic Buchanan of comics company Umlando Wezithombe, and to be translated into South Africa's 10 other official languages. A teacher's guide was also to be created.

Umlando Wezithombes produce African comic books and have covered topics such as Steve Biko, Xhosa Cattle Killings, Mapungubwe, Table Mountain, water conservation, quadriplegia, gay and lesbian rights, recycling, and more.

=== Belgian comics ===
In 1930 Hergé drew a story in which his character Tintin visits the Belgian Congo: Tintin in the Congo. True to the time period in which the story was drawn Africa is depicted in very stereotypical way with all black people living in tribes and being either simple-minded or lazy. Hergé later said that he never did any research in his early days and that the book was basically a reflection of how most Europeans thought about Africa. In 1939 Jijé made a comic strip named Blondin et Cirage, which featured a young white boy, Blondin, and his black African friend Cirage. Contrary to most depictions of black people around that time period Cirage was depicted as just as clever as his white friend. The series Lucky Luke by Morris features many Afro-Americans. Although it's not certain when the events happen, it can be assumed that the series is set after the American Civil War, as the Africans are never portrayed as slaves, but housekeepers and servants, as well as being very polite and helpful. In the comic En remontant le Mississippi (Travelling Up the Mississippi) released in 1961, features Africans as lazy but good workers.

=== Dutch comics ===
In 1947 the character Sjors by Frans Piët was teamed up with a black African child, Sjimmie, who spoke in broken Dutch. The series Sjors en Sjimmie ran for decades. In 1969 the character was remodelled by Jan Kruis, who dropped all the stereotypical elements.

=== Italian comics ===
One of the earliest Italian comic strips was about a little African boy named Bilbolbul. The comic was drawn between 1908 and 1933 by Attilio Mussino.

== Listed by company ==
=== DC Comics ===
- Adiremi – The personification of the living wind, she is a pattern in the clouds. One of the Orishas.
- Agemo – The chameleon, depicted as a shapeshifter. One of the Orishas.
- Computo (Danielle Foccart) – Member of an alternate version of the Legion of Super-Heroes; hails from Côte d'Ivoire.
- Doctor Mist – The former leader of both the Global Guardians and the Primal Force.
- Erinle – Depicted as a living flame, needs to consume to live. One of the Orishas.
- Esu – The trickster and maintainer of balance, based on Eshu. very similar to Anansi.
- Freedom Beast – a South African hero from the Global Guardians.
- Impala – A former member of the Global Guardians, now deceased.
- Invisible Kid (Jacques Foccart) – Member of the Legion of Super-Heroes and sister of Danielle Foccart; hails from Côte d'Ivoire.
- Jakuta – A warrior of living stone and earth. Like Shango, he is traditionally a thunder god known as "Thrower of Light". One of the Orishas.
- Kid Impala – A member of the Ultramarine Corps.
- Mawu – Mawu is the mother of the gods, based on Mawu. She is always depicted as riding the rainbow serpent Oshunmare. Mawu created Ifẹ̀ the living homeland of the gods, and imbued it with Lido (her life-force). Her traditional name is Mawu-Lisa. One of the Orishas.
- Mohammed Ibn Bornu – North African warrior hero from the Cadre of the Immortal. He rode a robot horse and carried an electronic spear that fired bolts of lightning.
- Molo – The International Sea Devil who represented Africa.
- Moremi – She appears to be a communally sentient flock of birds. One of the Orishas.
- Obatala of the White Cloth – The leader of the Orishas, based on Obatala. Used to take mortal form, was killed in mortal form by the king of Benin. He is later re-incarnated as a mortal man named Doctor Efraim Ngai, with no memory of his godly origins.
- Ochun – Similar to the naiads, Ochun personified the "Sweet Waters" and can manifest in any body of water, based on Oshun. One of the Orishas.
- Ogun – God of iron and the forge, sometimes referred to as He-Who-Is-Iron, based on Ogun. The blacksmith god who was the creator of the Golden Chain linking earth to Ifẹ̀, home of the gods. And he was also the one who broke the chain at Shango's request. One of the Orishas.
- Olorun – Depicted as a face that took up the entire sky, Olorun is defined as "He-Who-is-the-Sky", based on Olorun. Olorun was the first Orisha, born of Mawu into the land of Ifé.
- Orunmilla – The lawgiver of the Orishas, and voice of Olorun. Carries an everburning torch.
- Osain – Depicted as a human woman spontaneously formed from the leaves of a tree. One of the Orishas.
- Oshunmare – A giant rainbow serpent which is ridden by Mawu the goddess of creation, based on Oshunmare. One of the Orishas.
- Shango – A hotheaded, war-axe wielding thunder god capable of changing his size at will, based on Shango warchief of the Orishas.
- Tyroc - A member of the Legion of Super-Heroes; from the island of Marzal, off the coast of Africa.
- Vixen – A member of the Justice League. She was originally supposed to be the first African-American super heroine, but her comic was canceled during the DC Implosion.

=== Wildstorm (ABC/Homage) ===
- Anansi – an illusion-casting hero Astro City universe, based in Kenya where he fought the invading Enelsians.
- Flint – a superstrong and near invulnerable Kenyan woman. Formerly of Stormwatch and an associate of the Authority.

=== Marvel comics ===
- Anansi – Based on Anansi.
- Olumo Bashenga – An ancient Wakandan who was the first king of Wakanda and the first Black Panther some 10,000 years ago.
- Bedlam – A member of the Exemplars.
- The Black Musketeers – the trio of Dr. Joshua Itobo, Ishanta, and Khanata were all members of the royal family of the African kingdom of Wakanda. They were usually called to assist the king.
- Black Panther – The hereditary title of the ruler of Wakanda, who is currently T'Challa son of T'Chaka, grandson of T'Chanda aka Azzuri the Wise.
- Brillalae – Which means "She Who Glistens," is a native of Murkatesh. She attempted to recruit Abe Brown of America as the new Black Tiger. Heroes for Hire foiled her invasion of Halwan, a neighboring African country.
- Cub – A member of the Remnants (counter earth).
- Doctor Crocodile – An ally of Captain Britain.
- Embyrre – An ancient African vampiress.
- Erik Killmonger – A longtime enemy of the Black Panther.
- Frenzy – Part of the supervillains, Acolyte, and was also part of the X-Men.
- Gentle – A Wakandan student of the Xavier Institute.
- Hack – A teleporting mutant from Genosha.
- Ikon – A Black Panther villain named Dr. A'kurru, whose body was made of living wood.
- Impala – A villainous member of Bad Girls, Inc.
- Jetstream – Jetstream is a Moroccan mutant who was a member of the Hellions.
- Ivory – A member of the S.H.I.E.L.D. Super Soldiers.
- Leecher – A member of the Bio-Genes, a group of Somalian Mutant rebels.
- Lightbright – A member of the Intruders, formerly with the Bio-Genes, a group of Somalian mutant rebels.
- Mali – A member of the Bio-Genes, a group of Somalian Mutant rebels.
- Man-Ape – M'Baku was Wakanda's greatest warrior second only to the Black Panther. He plotted to usurp the throne with the help of the outlawed White Gorilla cult who were ancient rivals of the Black Panther cult, which effectively made them heretics since Panther worship is the state religion.
- Midnight Sun – An African child named M'Nai adopted by Fu Manchu, and raised alongside his son Shang-Chi. Fu Manchu impressed with his stoic nature, trained him as one of the Si-Fan - his elite assassins.
- Moses Magnum – The ruler of Canaan, a small offshoot of Wakanda. An enemy of the Black Panther.
- Mubaru – A Wakandan cabinet member who represented the Mountain Tribes.
- N'Kama – A Zulu warrior hired by Damon Dran to capture the Black Widow. Master of hand-to-hand combat, also a master hunter and tracker.
- N'Kantu, the Living Mummy (Swarili tribe's king).
- Panther Godness – The main deity of Wakanda, was identified as a version of the Egyptian goddess Bast. She is part of the group of Egyptian gods called Heliopolitans and the pantheon of Wakanda called Orishas.
- Punchout – A member of the Genoshan Press Gang.
- Sekmeht the Lion God – The leader of the Lion Cult of Wakanda, based on Sekhmet the ancient Egyptian deity and member of the Heliopolitans. Believes himself to be an actual God, opposed to the Panther Cult whose worship diminished his own followers. banished to another dimension by Iron Man and Mantis.
- Shango – Based on the orisha, Shango.
- Shola Inkosi – A telekinetic/telepathic mutant from Genosha.
- Solomon Prey – A villain and enemy of the Black Panther, he possesses bat-like wings that enables him to fly. Also has razor sharp claws.
- Sombre – An agent of Eric Killmonger and enemy of the Black Panther. Sombre's touch is highly corrosive and painful.
- Splice – Chandra Ku was a 13-year-old Zulu girl from the 18th century. Recruited into the Young Gods by an African goddess.
- Sparrow – A member of the Soldiers of Misfortune.
- Storm – Storm is a member of the X-Men who originates from Kenya. In the Ultimate Marvel continuity, Storm was born in Morocco.
- Transfaser – member of the Bio-Genes, a group of Somalian Mutant rebels.
- Vibrania – An ally of Speedball.
- Vibranium – The former king of Canaan. Baru was deposed by Moses Magnum and transformed into living Vibranium by the villain Diablo.
- Vibraxas – A former member of Fantastic Force.

==== Atlas Comics ====
- Waku Prince of the Bantu – The titular character was an African chieftain in a feature with no regularly featured Caucasian characters.

==== Marvel UK ====
- Afrikaa – Afrikaa Ngala first appears in Black Axe #5 Marvel UK. Draws power from a magma pool known as the "Heart of Afrikaa".
- Doctor Crocodile – Joshua N'dingi, Chief of the African nation of Mbangawi. A friend of Captain Britain and powerful magic user, it was he who uncovered Jamie Braddock's insanity and evil to his siblings Brian and Betsy.
- Howitzer – A member of the Genedogs, an English hero team combining mutants and mutates.

==== Strikeforce Morituri ====
- Silencer – Akiya Bandaranaike, who appeared in Strikeforce: Morituri by writer Peter B. Gillis and penciler Brent Anderson, volunteered to become a Morituri after discovering she was genetically compatible to undergo the process. Her strength and endurance were superhuman and she could nullify sound.

==== Supremeverse ====
- The Five – Five unnamed African superhumans who tell the Squadron Supreme and Hyperion to leave Africa and never return.
- The Voice – General John M'Butu, a genocidal tribal leader gifted with a powerful psychic suggestion ability with a vocal component.

== Small Press: Comic Book ==
=== African Prince ===
- Captain Africa – Based in Juba Castle near the high-tech metropolis called Egyptica, Prince Najee M’Witu is secretly Captain Africa, a brilliant detective.

=== All-Negro Comics ===
- Lion Man – American born, college educated Lion Man is a young scientist, sent by the United Nations to watch over the fearsome ‘magic mountain’ off the African Gold Coast.

=== ANIA Publishing ===
- Zwanna, Son of Zulu – An over the top caricature of the black superhero, complete with a "Zulu-sense", and the ability to summon the powers of the Zulu. He carries a short spear in one hand, with green tassles which are in fact magical vines that he can mentally control.

=== Arcane Comics ===
- Nighthawk – Appeared in the Soul Sorcerer.
- Noah – Appeared in the Soul Sorcerer.

=== Awesome Comics ===
- Nubian Knight – An ordinary man living in South Africa who is granted super powers by "El" an ancient Godlike being.

=== Comico ===
- Anansi.

=== Daathrekh Publishing ===
- NETERS – cifer-RA (high-science-entertainment) Daathrekh Publishing

=== Griot Enterprises ===
- The Horsemen – Incarnations of the Yoruba pantheon's orishas including Yemaya, Ogun, Obatala, Oshun, Shango, Oya, and Eshu.

=== Liberator ===
- C.U.S.H. – A team of black superhumans.

=== Miller Publishing Co. ===
- Ku-Zu'u, King of the Jungle (Wildman Comics & Stories #8, meets Xal-Kor the Human Cat).

=== UNForce ===
- Oba – A member of UNForce.

=== Urban Style Comics ===
- Dreadlocks – He is a blind, revolutionary hero empowered by the gods of ancient Alkebulan. Taught by the master teacher Pharohn, his duty is to bring Ma'at (order, justice, peace) to the people.

=== ZOOLOOK Comics ===
- Dread & Alive – ZOOLOOK's Dread & Alive introduces the first Jamaican superhero in comics, with its protagonist, Drew McIntosh, while featuring a black comic book series steeped in West African Spirituality.

== Small Press: Graphic Novel ==
=== Double Storey ===
- Red Monkey – Dave the Red Monkey, a red "apeman" stoner, lives in a surreal version of Cape Town alongside normal appearing humans. Dave appears in "Red Monkey: The Leaking Cello Case" written and illustrated by South African artist Joe Daly, and published by Double Storey in 2003. "The characters spend their lives in a sophisticated, new age version of hell. Monkey-footed Dave lives in decaying art deco splendour, dodging his underachieving dagga-smoking white buddies who are always out to loan a buck."

=== Gettosake ===
- Credence Walker – A Doc Savage styled adventurer in an alternate Africa, written by Travis G. Johnson, with plot and art by Jeremy & Robert Love. Originally slated to be published in 2004 by Gettosake Entertainment.

== Webcomics ==
- Eleggua – The modern incarnation of the Yoruba trickster deity Eleggua also known as Eshu. Created for the online medium by Alex Hernandez (writer) and illustrated by Korshi Dosoo . Here are links to the comic series, the first part Eleggua: Divine Infections and the second Eleggua: Blood & Thunder.

== Other media ==
=== Television ===
- Anansi (Static Shock) – A hero of Ghana, and the greatest hero in west Africa. Anansi has the power to create illusions. He is named after Anansi, the trickster spider of African folklore.

== See also ==
- List of black animated characters
- List of black superheroes
- Portrayal of black people in comic books
- Ethnic stereotypes in comics
- Stereotypes of African Americans
