= Tasmanian Devil (DC Comics) =

Publication information
- Publisher: DC Comics
- First appearance: Super Friends #7 (October 1977)
- Created by: E. Nelson Bridwell; Ramona Fradon

In-story information
- Alter ego: Hugh Dawkins
- Species: Metahuman
- Team affiliations: Global Guardians; Ultramarine Corps; Justice League International; Justice League; Justice League Queer; Justice League Task Force; Sleeping Soldiers
- Partnerships: Gregorio de la Vega (husband)
- Abilities: Transforms into a were-beast granting: Superhuman strength, speed, stamina, agility, and senses; Razor sharp claws and fangs

The Tasmanian Devil (Hugh Dawkins) is a superhero appearing in DC Comics. He is a gay pacifistic Australian metahuman with the ability to turn into a large anthropomorphic Tasmanian devil. Tasmanian Devil first appeared in Super Friends #7, with his first appearance in mainline continuity being in Infinity, Inc. #32.

== Fictional character biography ==
Tasmanian Devil is usually depicted as a metahuman who was born with superpowers. A humorous alternate origin was given, suggesting that he gained his powers from his mother, who possessed similar abilities to him and artificially gave him powers. Regardless, his parents had a hard time dealing with his alter ego until he saved his father's life.

Tasmanian Devil served as a superhero in Tasmania before joining the Global Guardians. He often fought alongside other heroes, such as the Super Friends and Infinity Inc. Later, the Guardians' base is destroyed and the team disbands. After leaving the Global Guardians, Tasmanian Devil works with the Justice League and the Ultramarine Corps. During his time in the League, Tasmanian Devil is revealed to be gay; he was previously romantically interested in Justice League liaison Joshua Barbazon and had a crush on Hal Jordan.

=== Justice League ===
Tasmanian Devil helps to rebuild the Justice League's embassy, which had been destroyed during an alien invasion. When Queen Bee reforms the Global Guardians as part of her scheme to brainwash heroes, Tasmanian Devil is left out of the roster due to his connections to the Justice League.

Tasmanian Devil joins the League in a mission to Bialya, which would turn out to be an illegal invasion, as Queen Bee's mole in the United Nations, Heimlich, had fired Captain Atom, Elongated Man, Ice, and Blue Beetle. Once Queen Bee's massive brainwashing efforts are uncovered, Tasmanian Devil learns that Doctor Mist, Jack O'Lantern, and Owlwoman were replaced by imposters, with the real heroes either missing or dead.

=== Death and return ===
In Justice League: Cry for Justice, Tasmanian Devil is apparently killed by Prometheus. It is later revealed that Prometheus had his body put into a stasis pod. He is fully healed and awakened after being placed in a Lazarus Pit. Tasmanian Devil helps Starman, Congorilla, Malavar, and Animal Man fight a group of enemies, and then returns to Australia to tell his mother that he is still alive.

In DC Pride, Tasmanian Devil joins Justice League Queer, which his husband Extraño assembles to defeat Eclipso.

== Powers and abilities ==
Hugh Dawkins is a metahuman with the ability to transform into a humanoid Tasmanian devil, similar to a werewolf. In this form, he possesses superhuman strength, claws, advanced healing, powerful fangs, and the ability to grow larger in size. Dawkins is a pacifist, but his transformed state is often aggressive and bestial.
