= Seraph (comics) =

- Seraph as depicted in Super Friends #41 (February 1981). Art by Ramona Fradon (penciler), Vince Colletta (inker) and Jerry Serpe (colorists).

Publication information
- Publisher: DC Comics
- First appearance: Super Friends #7 (October 1977)
- Created by: E. Nelson Bridwell (writer); Ramona Fradon (artist)

In-story information
- Alter ego: Chaim Levon
- Team affiliations: Global Guardians; Hayoth
- Abilities: Wields Ring of Solomon, Staff of Moses, and the mantle of Elijah.

Seraph (Chaim Levon) is a DC Comics superhero from Israel. He first appeared in Super Friends #7 (October 1977), and was created by E. Nelson Bridwell and Ramona Fradon, art by Bob Oksner and lettered by Milt Snapinn.

== Fictional character biography ==
Chaim Levon is a Jewish school teacher who wields mystical power. He helps Superman dismantle a bomb in Israel and free the Wonder Twins after they were brainwashed. As a member of the Global Guardians, he helped Superman retrieve an ancient artifact. Seraph remains with the Global Guardians for a few years and later works with Doctor Mist to rescue the Guardians from Bialya.

The team later confronts Doctor Mist's enemy Fain Y'onia. Thunderlord and Bushmaster die during separate confrontations with enemy. Seraph helps Rising Sun, Owlwoman, and Olympian create the New Global Guardians, with himself as leader.

In the series Doomsday Clock, Seraph is stated to be the leader of Hayoth, an Israeli team.

== Powers and abilities ==
Seraph possesses various powers derived from biblical figures. He wears the ring of Solomon, which gives him wisdom and allows him to teleport short distances, and the mantle of Elijah that protects him from harm. The Staff of Moses can extend to whatever length needed, transform into a serpent, and manipulate water. He apparently can request spectacular miracles from "a higher power" as he needs them. For instance, in a pre-Crisis adventure, he was battling villains who threatened to destroy a desalination plant. With no alternative, Seraph personally requested this higher power to temporarily stop the flow of time, allowing him to save the villains' hostages.

== See also ==
- Hayoth
- Sabra, an Israeli superhero in the Marvel Comics universe.
