= Justice League: Cry for Justice =

2009 limited comic book series

- Cover of Justice League: Cry for Justice #1 (September 2009), art by Mauro Cascioli.

Publication information
- Schedule: Monthly
- Format: Limited series
- No. of issues: 7
- Main character(s): Hal Jordan; Oliver Queen; Batwoman; Ray Palmer; Freddy Freeman; Mikaal Tomas; Congorilla; Supergirl

Creative team
- Written by: James Robinson
- Artist(s): Mauro Cascioli (1-5, 7); Scott Clark (5-7) (Ardian Syaff) on #1 and #5; Ibraim Roberson (7)
- Letterer: Steve Wands
- Colorist(s): Mauro Cascioli (1-5); Siya Oum (6-7)
- Editor(s): Eddie Berganza; Adam Schlagman

Collected editions
- Hardcover: ISBN 1-4012-2567-5

Justice League: Cry for Justice is a seven-issue comic book limited series, written by James Robinson, drawn by Mauro Cascioli, and published by DC Comics in 2009. It follows the adventures of a spin-off Justice League, led by Justice League veterans Green Lantern (Hal Jordan) and Green Arrow, and composed of Starman (Mikaal Tomas), Congorilla, Freddy Freeman, the Atom (Ray Palmer), and Supergirl (Kara Zor-El). They are seeking a more proactive stand for seeking justice following the apparent deaths of long-standing Justice League members Batman and Martian Manhunter during the Final Crisis event.

== Publication history ==
James Robinson and Mauro Cascioli announced that they would be starting a new Justice League series at Wizard World LA 2008. Robinson stated that this series would be about "justice and seeking justice, rather than responding to emergencies, letting the problems come to them, and being almost entirely reactive". Robinson revealed that the team would be brought together by a murder, and that it would be tied to Final Crisis.

Robinson explained that, "Hal Jordan decides that he wants a pro-active team. This team will go after the equivalent of the FBI's most wanted list, sometimes in different countries, sometimes through time. It's a nice eclectic team of established teams and some oddball characters I've thrown in". He also said that, "the difference is, the Justice League of America is all about the League, it's a family. While this is about justice. It's all about bringing in the bad guys".

The planned on-going series was changed to a seven-issue mini-series, the first issue of which went on sale July 1, 2009.

== Foreshadowing from previous series ==
In Final Crisis: Requiem, Hal Jordan and Oliver Queen contemplate the implications of having Martian Manhunter's killer run free. Writer Peter Tomasi confirms this, explicitly saying that, "J'onn's death will have repercussions... when the rage and anger is channeled by some of the big guns, especially Hal Jordan".

In Justice League of America vol. 2, #31, Hal and Oliver have a disagreement with Black Canary, the wife of Oliver and current chairwoman of the Justice League, over the formation of the "new league".

== Plot ==
After a heated argument with the other members of the Justice League about bringing villains to justice, Green Lantern and Green Arrow quit the Justice League to hunt for villains who were part of the Secret Society. Ray Palmer and Ryan Choi team up to beat up Killer Moth for information about the theft of some of Ray's technology. After being tortured by Palmer, Killer Moth reveals that the person who hired him was Prometheus. Starman (Mikaal Tomas) is distraught over the death of his boyfriend, Tony, who died when a group of villains attacked S.T.A.R. Labs. In Africa, Congorilla mourns the loss of his tribe and the death of Freedom Beast.

Starman and Congorilla meet and decide to find Shade. In Central City, Jay Garrick meets up with the Atom and Shazam to investigate the theft of cosmic treadmill technology from the Flash Museum. Green Lantern and Green Arrow defeat a group of villains that includes Prometheus, and are joined by Ray Palmer, Shazam, and Supergirl.

Green Lantern, Green Arrow, and Ray proceed to question Prometheus, but soon learn that it is Clayface impersonating him. They realize they have fallen into a trap just as a bomb goes off. At his headquarters, the real Prometheus brags to I.Q. that he has a plan in mind larger than his foes realize. Prometheus also revels at having killed Global Guardians members Tasmanian Devil, Gloss, and Sandstorm.

Freddy Freeman manages to save the others from Clayface's bomb. Deciding they need help, they go to the Justice League of America. Jay Garrick races home to find the Shade waiting to speak to him. Congorilla and Starman seek out Animal Man for help.

On the JLA satellite, the League has issues with Green Lantern and Green Arrow. The Guardian arrives with a device he recovered in Metropolis that the team discovers is a teleporter. Suddenly, Red Arrow shows up with his right arm ripped off. The others race to help Red Arrow, while Supergirl confronts Red Arrow's attacker, Shazam.

Shazam reveals that he is actually Prometheus and swiftly takes out each of the heroes through his computer, which has gathered all their weaknesses; as he makes his way to the JLA computer room and nearly reaches his goal when the Shade confronts him. He is confused; as he searches through every hero database he seems at a loss not to be able to find Shade (as he is a reformed villain turned hero) and is delayed long enough for a wounded Donna Troy to beat him unconscious and almost to death, but Shade stops her. Prometheus reveals that this has all been about hurting the heroes. He has placed devices in each of their home cities that will teleport the cities through time and space, leaving the people alive but lost. He says he will give up the location of each device if they let him go. When Green Arrow refuses to let him go, Prometheus states he has already started the countdown and Star City is the first target to activate.

Star City is in chaos as the heroes arrive and discover that the teleport device malfunctioned; instead of moving Star City elsewhere, part of the city was demolished. In the ruins of the city, Green Arrow finds the body of Lian Harper, Red Arrow's daughter, crushed under a building. Across the country, the various heroes are unable to disable the devices. With time running out, Green Arrow relents and tells the heroes to let Prometheus go. Prometheus tells them how to defuse the devices and then teleports away.

Shortly after the Blackest Night conflict, Prometheus is in his lair planning his next moves. Hearing a noise, he turns to see Green Arrow, who fires an arrow between Prometheus' eyes, killing him instantly.

== Follow-ups ==
The entire miniseries is said to be a herald toward James Robinson himself taking up writing in the regular Justice League of America title.

Justice League: The Rise and Fall was released in March 2010, along with a four-issue miniseries called Justice League: The Rise of Arsenal.

A story arc from Green Arrow vol. 4, #31-32 (2010), called "The Fall of Green Arrow", also shows the ramifications. A new Green Arrow series was launched under the Brightest Day banner in August 2010.

Robinson later wrote a one-shot entitled Starman/Congorilla, which was released in January 2011 and featured the resurrection of Tasmanian Devil following his death at the hands of Prometheus.

== Collected editions ==
The series was collected into the 232 page hardcover volume Justice League: Cry for Justice (June 2010, ISBN 1-4012-2567-5)

== Reception ==
Although the art was met with acclaim, some reviewers strongly criticized James Robinson's writing, especially the dialogue and characterization of the main characters. The final issue, in addition, was met with great controversy due in large part to the art and deaths of certain characters (in particular, Lian Harper). Despite the controversial reception, Robinson was nominated for Best Writing, while Mauro Cascioli was also nominated, in the 2010 Eisner Awards; neither won.
