= Olympian (character) =

The Olympian is the name of two fictional characters in DC Comics.

== Publication history ==
The original Olympian first appeared in "The Super Friends" #9 (December 1977) and was part of a three-issue story arc that introduced other international super heroes, and the Wonder Twins, to DC continuity. Later, a two-story arc appeared in "The Super Friends" issues #45 and #46 (June and July 1981) where Olympian teamed up with several international heroes and the Super Friends.

Olympian later appeared in DC Comics Presents #46 (June 1982) and was the first time that he and the other international heroes were working as a team, under the name The Global Guardians. He was created by E. Nelson Bridwell and Alex Saviuk.

The second Olympian first appeared in Wonder Woman (volume 3) #30 (May 2009) and was created by Gail Simone.

== Fictional character biography ==
=== Aristides Demetrios ===
Olympian
- Olympian from Wonder Girl #4, art by Sanford Greene.

Publication information
- Publisher: DC Comics
- First appearance: DC Comics Presents #46 (June 1982)
- Created by: Nelson Bridwell (writer); Alex Saviuk

In-story information
- Alter ego: Aristedes Demetrios; Achilles Warkiller
- Team affiliations: Global Guardians; Ultramarine Corps; Justice League
- Notable aliases: Aristedes Demetrios
- Abilities: Golden Fleece grants powers of the fifty Argonauts

Aristides Demetrios is a Greek national who wears the mythical Golden Fleece, which grants him the strength of Hercules and various other powers connected to the heroes who comprised the Argonauts. He aids Wonder Woman in battling Colonel Conquest in Greece, where a bomb was supposed to be hidden. In one incident, he helps Superman stop a gathering of mystical artifacts designed to bring back the villain Thaumar Dhai. They encounter Echidne, an old adversary of the Olympian who possesses a snake-like appearance. Olympian would later join Superman and many fellow Guardians on Easter Island. They again battled Echidne and her fellow mystics. Dhai's mystical return is reversed and he is seemingly destroyed. The Greek hero later meets Fury of Infinity, Inc.

Olympian is a founding member of the Global Guardians. As detailed in a flashback, Olympian protests when Icemaiden leaves the Global Guardians because of her feelings of inadequacy. Olympian joins the Global Guardians after he learns that they are supported by Queen Bee, the dictator of Bialya.

A romantic relationship with Dorcas Leigh (Godiva) his teammate in the Global Guardians is interrupted when an ancient villain named Fain Y'Onia attacks the duo in London. The Olympian rallies with the Guardians and ambushes Fain in the Arizona desert. During the battle, Tuatara is badly injured and Thunderlord is killed.

The Olympian is later seen as a member of the Ultramarine Corps. During his time with the group, he falls under the mental control of Gorilla Grodd and nearly kills Martian Manhunter and Aquaman. Grodd is defeated and most of the Corps travel to another universe. The Olympian later appears in Infinite Crisis #4. He is part of a group of mystically-aligned beings who make a failed attempt to gain the aid of the Spectre. He is briefly seen in #6, working with many other people, from the military to other heroes, including Owlwoman. They fight a holding battle to protect Metropolis from the Secret Society of Super-Villains. The Olympian returns in Wonder Girl #4 (February 2008) as the guardian of Cassandra Sandsmark and her mother Helena, a position appointed to him by Zeus. During this storyline it is revealed that he and Helena have romantic feelings for one another.

=== Achilles Warkiller ===
Olympian
- Achilles Warkiller debuts in Wonder Woman (vol. 3) #30 (May 2009).

Publication information
- Publisher: DC Comics
- First appearance: Wonder Woman (vol. 3) #30 (May 2009)
- Created by: Gail Simone

In-story information
- Place of origin: Thalarion
- Team affiliations: Gargareans; Outsiders
- Notable aliases: Achilles, Warkiller, Achilles Warkiller

Zeus created Achilles from the heart of the Hawaiian god Kāne Milohaʻi when he felt that the female Amazons had failed in their mission and a new race of all-male heroes would need to rise to carry out his plans. Achilles becomes the leader of the Gargareans and an ally of Wonder Woman. At one point, he is crowned the King of Themyscira, choosing the Amazon Alkyone as his queen. However, Alkyone plots to kill Wonder Woman as part of her plan to return Hippolyta to the throne. Achilles and Diana work together to overthrow Alkyone. Diana later introduces Achilles to a man named Patrick Cleese, who he recognizes as the reincarnation of his beloved Patroclus. He eventually settles in Markovia and joins the Outsiders. In a 2011 interview with Bleeding Cool, Gail Simone revealed that Achilles is gay.

== Powers and abilities ==
While in possession of the Golden Fleece, Aristedes can use all of the skills, powers and natural abilities possessed by the fifty original Argonauts. These abilities include the power of Hercules, the precognitive abilities of Idmon, the telescopic and x-ray vision of Lynceus, the speed of Atalanta, wisdom of Admetus, the memory of Aethalides, ability to walk on water like Euphemus, the flight ability of Zetes and Calais, the shapeshifting ability of Periclymenus, and the invulnerability of Achilles.

Zeus granted Achilles Warkiller superhuman strength, speed, stamina and durability; the ability to fly; and regenerative abilities. He also rides into battle on-top of Mysia, a mystical elephant with three eyes and two trunks who is capable of flight.

== Other versions ==
- An alternate universe variant of Aristides Demetrios / Olympian appears in Trinity #16. He attempts to penetrate a wall of energy surrounding Europe, only to be killed upon contact with the wall.
- An alternate universe variant of Olympian from Earth-35 appears in The Multiversity. This version is a sports-themed superhero and a member of the Super-Americans.

== In other media ==
=== Television ===
A character loosely based on the Olympian appears in the Powerless episode "Sinking Day", portrayed by Matthew Atkinson. This version is Alex, an accountant working for Wayne Enterprises who is believed to be the Olympian.

=== Miscellaneous ===
- The Aristides Demetrios incarnation of the Olympian appears in the Super Friends tie-in comics.
- The Aristides Demetrios incarnation of the Olympian appears in Batman: The Brave and the Bold #7.
