= Centrix =

- Centrix as depicted in Justice League Quarterly #17 (December 1994). Art by Dan Rodriguez (penciller), Richard Space (inker), and Robbie Busch (colorist).

Publication information
- Publisher: DC Comics
- First appearance: Justice League Quarterly #17 (Winter 1994)
- Created by: Paul Kupperberg (script); Danny Rodriguez (pencils); Richard Space (inks)

In-story information
- Alter ego: Mark Armstrong
- Team affiliations: Global Guardians
- Abilities: Energy wave projection

Centrix is a fictional superhero in the DC universe and a member of the superhero team the Global Guardians.

== Fictional character biography ==
Mark Armstrong is a metahuman with the ability to project energy force waves from his body. He also has small projectiles that can be propelled by his energy force waves. He uses his powers to stop criminals in his native Canada and is a practitioner of New Age philosophies.

In Justice League Quarterly #17 (Winter 1994), he joins the Global Guardians after one of their darkest periods. One of their old enemies, Fain Y'Onia, attacks and kills Bushmaster and Thunderlord. Godiva, Impala and Tuatara are badly injured. The Wild Huntsman is missing in action, having vanished in the seeming defeat of Fain.

The survivors recruit Centrix, along with Tundra, Chrysalis and Cascade.
