= Jack O'Lantern (DC Comics) =

- The Marvin Noronsa incarnation of Jack O'Lantern as depicted in Justice League Europe #30 (September 1991). Art by Darick Robertson and John Beatty.

Publication information
- Publisher: DC Comics
- First appearance: (Cormac): Super Friends #8 (November 1977) (Noronsa): Justice League Europe Annual #1 (1990) (McHugh): Justice League Quarterly #14 (spring 1994)
- Created by: (Cormac): E. Nelson Bridwell, Ramona Fradon (Noronsa): Keith Giffen, J. M. DeMatteis (McHugh): Steven T. Seagle, Ken Hooper

In-story information
- Alter ego: Daniel Cormac; Marvin Noronsa; Liam McHugh
- Team affiliations: (Cormac): Global Guardians (McHugh): Primal Force; Ultramarine Corps
- Abilities: (Cormac, Noronsa): Mystical lantern provides flight, flame projection, teleportation, illusion casting, enhanced strength, fog creation (McHugh): Has internalized the powers of the lantern used by his predecessors

Jack O'Lantern is the name of several characters appearing in American comic books published by DC Comics.

== Fictional character biography ==
=== Daniel Cormac ===
The first Jack O'Lantern is Daniel Cormac of Ireland, who was granted a magic lantern by an Irish fairy. Cormac is a member of the Global Guardians, an international group of superheroes. Cormac was created for the Super Friends tie-in comic, appearing in three solo back up stories in issues #37, #40 and #44.

Cormac's first appearance in the mainstream DC Comics universe is DC Comics Presents #46, helping Superman find an ancient ruin in Ireland. He is later seen as part of a group of heroes from Ireland and England trying to save the world in the Crisis on Infinite Earths.

When the United Nations decide to fund the Justice League International, the Global Guardians find themselves without financial support and disband. After leaving the Global Guardians, Cormac joins Rumaan Harjavti's army in Bialya. Harjavti is later killed by Queen Bee, who Cormac voluntarily joins forces with.

Cormac later returns to the Global Guardians. He helps reunite the Global Guardians and fights Sonar with the Justice League. Cormac later dies of natural causes.

=== Marvin Noronsa ===
Marvin Noronsa is a native of Bialya who takes over the Jack O'Lantern identity at Queen Bee's behest. Noronsa is able to use Cormac's mystical lantern only after Queen Bee modifies it. Noronsa is later killed in an explosion caused by Sumaan Harjavti, Rumaan Harjavti's brother.

=== Liam McHugh ===
Cormac's cousin Liam McHugh assumes the mantle of Jack O'Lantern. An Irish freedom fighter who wields a mystical jack o'lantern and is blessed with incredible agility, McHugh has fought evil in various arenas over the past few years. He was a member of the Leymen (Primal Force) and later joined the Ultramarine Corps in Superbia. McHugh joins Doctor Mist's Leymen in Primal Force #0, appearing in every issue until the book was cancelled with issue #14. McHugh appears as a member of the Ultramarine Corps in JLA #26 and JLA Classified #1-3.

== Powers and abilities ==
Daniel Cormac and Marvin Noronsa have a mystical lantern that gives them the power of flight, flame projection, teleportation, illusion casting, enhanced strength, and the ability to create fogs. The power of the lantern is at its weakest at noon, and gradually increases to its peak at midnight.

Liam McHugh has found a way to internalize the powers of the mystical lantern, and no longer needs to carry it.

== In other media ==
The Marvin Noronsa incarnation of Jack O'Lantern appears in Powerless, portrayed by Kimani Ray Smith.
