= Hayoth =

DC Comics superhero team

- Clockwise from the left Ramban, Golem and Judith; artist Geof Isherwood.

Publication information
- Publisher: DC Comics
- First appearance: Suicide Squad #45 (September 1990)
- Created by: John Ostrander (writer); Kim Yale (writer); Geof Isherwood (artist)

In-story information
- Base(s): Israel
- Member(s): Dybbuk; Golem; Judith; Ramban

The Hayoth are a fictional team of superpowered Israeli commandos published by DC Comics. They first appeared in Suicide Squad #45 (September 1990), and were created by John Ostrander, Kim Yale and Geof Isherwood. Hayoth's team name is a reference to four holy beasts from the Zohar.

== Publication history ==
=== Kobra ===
Hayoth are a team of four super powered covert operatives who act as a special division of the Mossad. Their first contact with the West comes when Amanda Waller is contracted to capture Kobra. Waller is informed of Hayoth's existence by an Egyptian operative named Nazair. Nazair claims that even though Kobra is in Israel, he is a threat to Egypt's interests as well.

Waller and the Suicide Squad covertly sneak into Jerusalem, seeking to capture or kill Kobra. However, the Squad's arrival is detected by Hayoth, and their Mossad liaison Colonel Hacohen takes Waller and Vixen into custody to show them that Hayoth has already captured Kobra. Waller figures out that Kobra allowed Hayoth to capture him, but is unsure of why. Judith critically wounds Vixen and is nearly killed by Bronze Tiger.

Meanwhile, the Atom discovers Kobra's true plan to corrupt Dybbuk, Hayoth's AI team member. Kobra "corrupts" Dybbuk through a series of philosophical conversations about the nature of good and evil. He then attempts to use Dybbuk to start World War III. The day is saved by Ramban, who has a lengthy conversation with Dybbuk about the nature of good and evil, choice, and morality.

=== Ray Palmer ===
Their next encounter occurs when Hayoth mistakenly believe they will be allowed to take Qurac's former president, Hurrambi Marlo, into custody. This misunderstanding causes Hayoth to become embroiled in a four-way conflict with Justice League members Superman, Batman, and Aquaman.

After a series of skirmishes, Superman ends the fight with a shockwave caused by clapping both his hands together. The League members confront Atom and learn of Micro Force and their murder of Adam Cray, who had been impersonating Atom as a member of the Suicide Squad.

=== Dybbuk and Ifrit ===
In order to gain Hayoth's freedom after acting illegally in the United States, Dybbuk agrees to help deprogram Ifrit, an artificial intelligence based on Mindboggler. Dybbuk succeeds, and Mindboggler recalls her original identity of Leah Wasserman. She and Dybbuk, now calling himself Lenny, are engaged to be married.

=== Doomsday Clock ===
In "Doomsday Clock", Hayoth is stated to have been assembled as Israel's superhero team. The group is led by Seraph and consists of Dybbuk, Golem, Judith, Ramban, and Pteradon.

== Membership ==
- Dybbuk - An artificial intelligence who functions as the team's strategist and provides electronic countermeasures. It is based on the same magnetic bottle technology used to create Djinn and Ifrit. The character is named after the dybbuk, a malicious possessing spirit in Jewish folklore.
- Golem - Moyshe Nakhman possesses a clay-like body that he can shift between various solid and liquid forms. The character is named after the golem, an animated being created entirely from inanimate matter in Jewish folklore.
- Colonel Hacohen - The division's commanding officer and Mossad liaison.
- Judith - An expert in fencing and shuriken-jutsu, trained in the martial arts and infiltration, calls herself the "Sword of Zion". Her main weapon appears to be a Mughal Talwar.
- Ramban - A magician who is the first leader of Hayoth. He is named for Kabbalist, philosopher, and physician Nachmanides (also known as Ramban).
- Seraph - The leader of the Hayoth during the timeframe of Doomsday Clock.
- Pteradon - He is a former military anti-terrorist unit leader who, following a transformation, becomes a living, humanoid pterodactyl. The character is a hybrid, often depicted with superior combat skills and aerial agility. He has been a villain, but is now functioning as a hero in the timeframe of Doomsday Clock.
