= Global Guardians =

DC comics superhero team

- DC Comics Presents #46, art by Ross Andru and Frank Giacoia.

Publication information
- Publisher: DC Comics
- First appearance: DC Comics Presents #46 (June 1982)
- Created by: E. Nelson Bridwell (writer); Ramona Fradon, Alex Saviuk (artists)

In-story information
- Base(s): The Dome
- Member(s): Jet; Gloss; Tasmanian Devil; Manticore; Sandstorm; Freedom Beast; Crimson Fox

The Global Guardians is a team of DC Comics superheroes whose members hail from countries around the world. The concept originated in the Super Friends Saturday morning cartoon, which aired after the comics stories in Super Friends #7-9, in which several heroes (Black Vulcan, Samurai, Apache Chief and El Dorado) were added to the Justice League to give it more ethnic diversity.

== Fictional team history ==
The characters that would form the Global Guardians first appeared in the Super Friends comic book series. They were first introduced in a story (in Super Friends #7-9) in which an alien villain called Grax (an old Superman foe) planted bombs on Earth's seven continents to destroy it. Thanks to a warning from the Wonder Twins (in their first comic book appearance) the Justice League discovered the plan in time and recruited the heroes of the countries affected to find the bombs before they exploded.

These international heroes would later appear in other issues of Super Friends. However, it wasn't until DC Comics Presents #46 (June 1982) that they were introduced as a team, in a story in which they helped Superman to stop an evil Atlantean sorcerer named Thaumar Dhai. This is also considered to be these characters' first canonical appearance in the DC Universe.

After Crisis on Infinite Earths, it was revealed that the Global Guardians had been gathered together by Doctor Mist to serve as the enforcing arm of an international organization called "The Dome", which had been created by the Treaty of Rome in 1957 to help organize the efforts of superheroes across the globe as an international police organization.

Prior to that, in the early 1950s, several international heroes who had been the beneficiaries of the Justice Society of America's kindness during and after World War II, had banded together in an informal "Club of Heroes". They were integrated in the Global Guardians after its foundation. Batman's butler Alfred Pennyworth sends Christmas cards to the surviving members of the club.

This original Global Guardians were based in a United Nations-financed headquarters building also called the Dome located in Paris. The original team was also funded by Doctor Mist and administrated by a woman called Belphegor who was gifted with psychic powers. Many of the Guardians individually assisted other international heroes during the Crisis on Infinite Earths crossover and once teamed up with Infinity, Inc.

The Guardians eventually lost their UN funding to the Justice League, and the Dome was ordered to close, in part due to the political machinations of their enemy, Dr. Klaus Cornelius. The team disband and Green Flame and Ice Maiden apply for League membership. Initially rejected they are then offered the membership slot created by Black Canary's departure. After a brief time they change their codenames to Fire and Ice.

They are brainwashed by Queen Bee and directed to summon all of their old team mates, who met with a similar fate. While Owl Woman and Jack O'Lantern lurk in the shadows, Rising Sun, Wild Huntsman and Tuatara attack members of the newly formed Justice League Europe. At the end of this initial battle, Queen Bee makes an agreement with the League, and they form an uneasy truce. Green Flame and Icemaiden do not get directly involved and the other members remain in Bialya.

The next battle between the Guardians and the League occurs during the 'Breakdowns' story arc. During a confrontation in Bialya, Little Mermaid is accidentally killed by Jack O'Lantern, while battling Captain Atom. Jack O'Lantern is also killed and unmasked as an imposter and Doctor Mist is revealed to be an android. Queen Bee is killed and the Guardians regain their free will. The world mourns the loss of Little Mermaid and Jack O'Lantern as Owl Woman is reported as missing.

In Justice League Quarterly 6, Owl Woman reappears. She has been on the run since 'Breakdowns' concluded and is being pursued by the new Bialyan government through the underground passages beneath the city. She discovers the original Jack O'Lantern very much alive and imprisoned and sets him free. Doctor Mist appears and advises that he will get them both medical attention before reforming the Guardians. They recruit Seraph and Tasmanian Devil before approaching Rising Sun who has just been on a successful date with the female Dr Light. They then travel to Bialya and resue the rest of the team. With a new Dome being built as their headquarters the Global Guardians are finally reunited.

The Guardians next appear as background characters in the Justice League's battle with Sonar in Moscow. Little Mermaid is once again seen as a member; when she is confronted by the Flash, she explains that her evil twin had been killed in Bialya.

Fain Y'onia, an ancient foe of Doctor Mist, killed Bushmaster and Thunderlord and depowered several other members. The surviving Guardians would continue to meet in the Dome's Headquarters, which was formerly located in Europe but is now in the Pacific. The series Justice League Quarterly introduces four new members to the team: Centrix of Canada, Cascade of Indonesia, Chrysalis of France and Tundra of Russia.

In a story in the JLA Classified series, some of the Guardians, Impala, Olympian and Jack O'Lantern join the Ultramarine Corps.

In the storyline One Year Later, #10, the Global Guardians are shown regrouped, apparently led by former New Guardian Jet. They attempt to recruit the newest Crimson Fox. When she declines, they say she has no choice. Crimson Fox is later seen publicly voicing the opinions of the Guardians, among them a hatred for Hal Jordan. It is eventually revealed that they are being telepathically controlled by the Faceless Hunter in his attempts to capture Green Lantern. They are defeated and freed from the alien's control.

In Justice League: Cry for Justice, Prometheus targets or kills members of the Global Guardians, including Tasmanian Devil, Gloss, Sandstorm, and Freedom Beast.

In Absolute Power: Task Force VII, the team are shown to be back together and consisting of Little Mermaid, Wild Huntsman, Nightrunner, Tasmanian Devil, Jet, Freedom Beast, Jack O'Lantern, Fleur-De-Lis, Thunderlord, Owl Woman, Seraph, Chrysalis, Belphegor and Tuatara.

== Members ==
=== Founding members ===
- Seraph (Chaim Lavon): An Israeli Jewish teacher who was granted biblical powers. He wears the ring of Solomon, which gives him wisdom and allows him to teleport, and the mantle of Elijah, which protects him from harm. His staff can change size, manipulate water, and transform into a snake.
- Bushmaster (Bernal Rojas): A Venezuelan herpetologist who invented gadgets that mimic the abilities of reptiles. He is later killed by Fain Y'onia.
- Olympian (Aristides Demetrios): A hefty Greek punk who wears the Golden Fleece, which grants him the powers and abilities of the 50 men and women who sailed on the Argo to find the Golden Fleece.
- Jack O'Lantern (Daniel Cormac): A poor Irish farmer who was granted a magic lantern by an Irish fairy. He later dies of natural causes. The Jack O'Lantern mantle is later assumed by Marvin Nirosa, an agent of Queen Bee, and Daniel Cormac's cousin Liam McHugh.
- Impala (M'Bulaze): A South African Zulu warrior who possesses superhuman speed. He later loses his powers to Fain Y'onia and is killed by Roulette. His successor, Kid Impala, joined the Ultramarine Corps.
- The Little Mermaid (Ulla Paske): A teenaged Danish Atlantean-human hybrid who can transform into a mermaid-like form.
- Doctor Mist (Nommo): An ancient African sorcerer who served as the leader of the Global Guardians. He is later killed by Mordru.
- Tasmanian Devil (Hugh Dawkins): An Australian former engineer and drama coach who can transform into a humanoid tasmanian devil. He is openly gay and in a relationship with Starman (Mikaal Tomas).
- Rising Sun (Izumi Yasunari): A Japanese solar physicist who can control solar energy.
- Owlwoman (Wenonah Littlebird): A Cherokee member of the Global Guardians who possesses owl-like abilities.
- Thunderlord (Liang Xih-k'ai): A Taiwanese Buddhist monk with a powerful sonic voice.
- Tuatara (Jeremy Wakefield): A hero themed after his namesake who can see the future via his third eye.
- Godiva (Dorcas Leigh): An English socialite with powerful prehensile hair.
- Wild Huntsman (Albrecht von Mannheim): A German warrior who wields various magical weapons and is assisted by a horse (Orkan) and a hound (Donnerschlag).
- Green Fury (Beatriz da Costa): A Brazilian member of the Global Guardians who can generate mystical green fire. She later joins the Justice League under the name Fire.
- Glacier (Sigrid Nansen): A Norwegian member of the Global Guardians who can generate ice. They were formerly known as Icemaiden.

=== The Club of Heroes ===
- The first Knight of England was followed by his son, the second Knight.
- The second Squire of England was followed by his daughter, the third Squire.
- The Gaucho of Argentina inspired the Argentinian hero team Super Malon.
- The Musketeer of France.
- The Wingman of Sweden.
- The Legionary of Italy.
- Man-Of-Bats of Sioux Nation
- Little Raven of Sioux Nation
- The Ranger of Australia

=== Later members ===
- Cascade (Sujatmi Sunowaparti): An Indonesian member of the Global Guardians who can manipulate and transform into water.
- Gloss (Xiang Po): A Chinese member of the Global Guardians who can draw energy from ley lines.
- Chrysalis: A butterfly-like android created in France.
- Fleur-de-Lis (Noelle Avril): A former spy who does not have any superpowers, but is skilled in espionage and marksmanship.
- Icemaiden (Tora Olafsdotter): A Norwegian member of the Global Guardians who can generate ice. She later joins the Justice League as Ice.
- Tundra: A Russian member of the Global Guardians who can generate ice.

=== Pre-Flashpoint ===
- Crimson Fox of France
- Freedom Beast of South Africa
- Jet of Jamaica
- Manticore of Greece.
- Sandstorm of Syria (possibly deceased)

== Related sources ==
Cadre of the Immortal is a group of international heroes operating in the DC Comics universe. The Cadre is home to five Super Friends/Super Powers Collection doppelgangers: Black Vulcan (Mohammed Ibn Bornu), Apache Chief (Seneca), Samurai (Musashi), El Dorado (Xiuhtecutli), and Golden Pharaoh (Osiris).
