= List of Dr. Stone characters =

Some characters of the series, including (from left to right): Kinro, Ginro, Kohaku, Kaseki (back), Senku Ishigami, Chrome, Ruri, Suika (bottom) and Gen Asagiri

The manga series Dr. Stone features an extensive cast of characters created by Riichiro Inagaki and Boichi.

== Main characters ==
=== Senku Ishigami ===
Voiced by: Yūsuke Kobayashi, Mikako Komatsu (child) (Japanese); Aaron Dismuke, Mikaela Krantz (child) (English)

Senku Ishigami (石神 千空, Ishigami Senkū) is a teenage prodigy who excels in multiple fields of science, with a special love of astronomy and space exploration. After awakening in the "Stone World", he sets out to restore civilization by reinventing their lost technology and discovering a "cure" for the petrification. Though somewhat arrogant, he is very noble and kind-hearted as he considers science as a means to elevate all people and has unshakable faith in his friends. After faking his death to keep Tsukasa from hunting him, Senku befriends the residents of Ishigami Village and becomes their chief, finding out that he is a legend in the village's community at the same time thanks to the influence through one of the villagers' ancestors, who happens to be Senku's late adoptive father Byakuya, one of the original petrification survivors. Following Hyoga's defeat and Tsukasa entering cryosleep, Senku was able to get the remnants of the Empire of Might to merge with the Kingdom of Science where he leads the Five Wise Generals. He has Albert Einstein's formula (E = mc^{2}) as his trademark.

=== Taiju Oki ===
Voiced by: Makoto Furukawa (Japanese); Ricco Fajardo, Emily Fajardo (child) (English)

Taiju Oki (大木 大樹, Ōki Taiju) is Senku's best friend, whom Senku refers to as a "big oaf" or "musclehead". He has incredible strength and seemingly limitless stamina with the awareness of a pacifist who's never thrown a punch in his life, preferring to turn the other cheek instead to prevent any assailants from hurting his friends. He is in love with Yuzuriha and will do anything to take care of her, especially when she's in danger. Taiju is a typical high schooler and simply believes smartphones are an important tool for civilization. After Senku fakes his death to keep Tsukasa from hunting them, Taiju and Yuzuriha infiltrate the Tsukasa Empire to keep tabs on Tsukasa before rejoining Senku in Ishigami Village. As a member of the Power Team, Taiju leads its farming division while assisted by Yō and Magma.

=== Yuzuriha Ogawa ===
Voiced by: Kana Ichinose (Japanese); Brittany Lauda (English)

Yuzuriha Ogawa (小川 杠, Ogawa Yuzuriha) is Taiju's love interest, a cheerful and kind-hearted young woman. She enrolled in her high school's handicrafts club to pursue her goal of becoming a fashion designer and is exceptionally talented at arts like stitching and clothwork. Moments before the petrification light, Taiju is about to confess to Yuzuriha, so she patiently waits to return them officially when the quest to rebuild civilization is resolved. During the "Vs. Tsukasa" arc, Tsukasa takes Yuzuriha captive. Senku has her and Taiju spy within the Tsukasa Empire as part of his plan till the next year when the cell phone is buried in Senku's fake gravestone. During the "Age of Exploration" arc, Yuzuriha started a clothing store joining the Craftsmanship and Development Team. She and Taiju got married after the Moon-Landing project.

=== Tsukasa Shishio ===
Voiced by: Yuichi Nakamura (Japanese); Ian Sinclair (English)

Tsukasa Shishio (獅子王 司, Shishiō Tsukasa) is a youth who rose to fame in mixed martial arts as "The Strongest Primate High Schooler", being physically powerful enough to kill a lion with one punch. After being reawakened by Senku to save him and Taiju from a lion pack, Tsukasa wears the pelt of the male lion he killed while hunting for Senku and Taiju. He resents adults due to his experience with one who prevented him from gathering seashells for his comatose sister Mirai, viewing the current adults as avaricious corruption while seeking to create a new society in the "Stone World" by only reviving young people. Tsukasa serves as the primary antagonist of the early story arcs, appearing to kill Senku when he refuses to back down from restoring their civilization before proceeding to establish his Empire of Might. Through the revived Gen to confirm Senku's death, Tsukasa remained in the dark about his opposition's survival until he learned it from Hyoga. During the "Communications" arc, Tsukasa accepted a truce with Senku in exchange for the theoretical revival of his sister, after which Hyoga betrayed him. The critical injuries Tsukasa suffered from the fight forced him to be placed in cryosleep with his remaining forces absorbed into the Kingdom of Science. However, he does get to see Mirai get restored to good health beforehand. When Tsukasa is revived, he sides with Senku accompanied on his trip to the United States of America while still striving for a morally pure world where the innocent will not be exploited.

=== Kohaku ===
Voiced by: Manami Numakura (Japanese); Felecia Angelle (English)

Kohaku (コハク) is the strongest warrior of Ishigami Village and Ruri's younger sister, a tomboyish young woman who is exceptionally strong, agile, and sharp-eyed. She is the first villager Senku meets after awakening in the "Stone World" and becomes one of his staunchest allies as part of the Kingdom of Science's Power Team. A running gag is when her femininity is insulted for being called a gorilla or a lioness. She shows good caring towards her friends and comrades, particularly Suika. Kohaku enjoys the concept of romance and does not mind the idea of being betrothed to Senku despite his lack of interest. She once kissed Senku as part of a distraction on Treasure Island.

=== Chrome ===
Voiced by: Gen Satō (Japanese); Matt Shipman (English)

Chrome (クロム, Kuromu) is a youth from Ishigami Village who named himself the village's self-proclaimed sorcerer when stumbled upon the basics of science and mistook them as sorcery, wanting to cure Ruri. His hobby of rock collecting and managing chemical reactions stems from the Hundred Tales. Chrome later learns about the scientific wonders of the old world and becomes Senku's partner as he helps him rediscover humanity's scientific legacy. When the Kingdom of Science and the remnants of the Tsukasa Empire merge, Chrome becomes one of the Five Wise Generals and a part of the Craftsmanship and Development Team. He has had multiple failed attempts to confess his affection to Ruri, until finally proposing to her (in an underwhelming manner) and getting married in the 4D manga.

=== Suika ===
Voiced by: Karin Takahashi (Japanese); Sarah Wiedenheft (English)

Suika (スイカ) is a young girl from Ishigami Village who wears a watermelon on her head to cover up her "fuzzy sickness". She ends up gravitating to Senku, helping him as he is the first person not to judge her for her eccentricities before he outfitted her watermelon helmet with customized lenses. Suika often helps Senku out by being a scout for different missions where she can withdraw into her watermelon helmet. Following the merging of the Kingdom of Science and the Tsukasa Empire, Suika became a member of the Intelligence Team. After the second worldwide petrification event, Suika is the only person to be released as part of a contingency put in place by the Kingdom of Science. As she grows into a teenager in the following seven years, she works alone to recreate the revival fluid, successfully bringing Senku and the others back.

=== Gen Asagiri ===
Voiced by: Kengo Kawanishi (Japanese); Brandon McInnis (English)

Gen Asagiri (浅霧 幻(あさぎり ゲン), Asagiri Gen) is another person from the "old world", Gen is a silver-tongued self-help guru who styles himself as a mentalist. Gen wears an overcoat over his yukata and is always barefoot except in the winter. He was revived by Tsukasa who wanted an ally who could think like Senku and confirm his death. But being self-serving, Gen ends up defecting to the Kingdom of Science after witnessing Senku's accomplishments. He is confident in his tactics as a proficient manipulator, although this facade is not always present as Gen appears to react freely in shock whenever Senku brings up his next planned invention. When the Kingdom of Science and the remnants of the Empire of Might merge following the defeat of Hyoga and Tsukasa entering cryosleep, Gen becomes one of the Five Wise Generals.

=== Ryusui Nanami ===
Voiced by: Ryōta Suzuki (Japanese); Clifford Chapin (English)

Ryusui Nanami is the patriarch and youngest son of Nanami Conglomerate's owner who was revived by Senku in the "Age of Exploration" arc to be part of the Kingdom of Science as one of the Five Wise Generals. His personality is akin to that of a self-indulgent rich boy fueling his ambition to earn success through his own talent which Minami finds rather annoying and in contrast to Tsukasa's preference. Ryusui spends his allowance on model ships and is active in sailing any type of ship. As an expert sailor, he was made the Captain of the Perseus which he helped build as part of the Craftsmanship and Development Team. Like Senku, Ryusui has the drive to rebuild society aside from his proclamation as leader of the new world.

== Recurring characters ==
=== Kingdom of Science and Tsukasa Empire ===
When Tsukasa was revived and had some differences with Senku, two factions arose. The Kingdom of Science (科学王国, Kagaku Ōkoku) was made by Senku to recreate the scientific achievements in the world. The Tsukasa Empire (司帝国, Tsukasa Teikoku) or Empire of Might was made so the strong could rule. When Hyoga was defeated and Tsukasa entered cryosleep, the remnants of the Tsukasa Empire merged with the Kingdom of Science which later gained new members from those who were freed from their petrification.

Hyoga Akatsuki (暁 氷月, Akatsuki Hyōga)
Voiced by: Akira Ishida (Japanese); Jerry Jewell (season 1–3), Kieran Flitton (season 4) (English)
Hyoga is a tall and fairly built spear-armed man who is strong enough to take on 10 attackers. He is revived by Tsukasa during the "Vs. Hyoga" arc. Hyoga and some Tsukasa Empire fighters took on the Ishigami Village's finest until it was discovered that Gen rigged their weapons. Hyoga himself is an elitist who believes in social Darwinism. After Mirai's revival, he betrays Tsukasa causing an unlikely team-up between Senku and Tsukasa to defeat him. The imprisoned Hyoga had to accompany Senku who needed some additional muscle. Later, in the "Treasure Island" arc, Senku revives Hyoga to fight against Moz, only for them to both get petrified by Ibara, causing him to be a statue again. In the "South America" arc, Hyoga is reformed and officially joins the Power Team.
Homura Momiji (紅葉 ほむら, Momiji Homura)
Voiced by: Aki Toyosaki (Japanese); Megan Shipman (English)
Homura is a member of the Tsukasa Empire who was a gymnast prior to the petrification and is the right-hand to Hyoga. Homura was released from her petrification and has an allegiance to Hyoga. Homura assisted Hyoga in the first attack on Ishigami Village where she snuck into the village and set fire to some of the huts. Her gymnastics prowess means her speed and agility are more than a match to Kohaku's. During the "Communications" arc, she did some surveillance on Ishigami Village. When Homura tried to sabotage the radio tower, Magma and Kinro cut the tree enabling Kohaku to catch her. Homura did manage to cave-in the Miracle water obscure the revival fluid. During the "New America" arc, Homura had to accompany Senku who needed some additional muscle.
Minami Hokutozai (北東西 南, Hokutōzai Minami)
Voiced by: Yoko Hikasa (Japanese); Kristi Rothrock (English)
Minami was a journalist prior to petrification who knew famous people. After being released from her petrification, Minami serves Tsukasa where she wears a leather dress and is always barefoot. She is heavily enamored with Tsukasa. Both of them agree that the world before the petrification was awful. When Hyoga was defeated and Tsukasa entered cryosleep, Minami was among those who joined the Kingdom of Science where she joined their Intelligence Team. During the "Age of Exploration" arc, Minami and Gen bargain for the stone formula so that they can reawaken Francois to recreate the camera. She wastes no time in chronicling Perseus' voyage.
Ukyō Saionji (西園寺 羽京, Saionji Ukyō)
Voiced by: Kensho Ono (Japanese); Mark Allen Jr. (English)
Ukyo Saionji is an SDF Navy sailor and submarine sonar operator who was released from petrification by Tsukasa. He is an expert in different languages and has super-sensitive hearing. When he worked with Tsukasa, Ukyo became an expert archer and one of Tsukasa's scouts. During the "Communications" arc, Ukyo attacked Chrome, Gen, and Magma while setting up telephone poles which ended with him capturing Chrome. When Senku and Gen made contact with him, Ukyo agreed to their terms in exchange for a "no death" rule due to Tsukasa shattering petrified humans and suspecting that Hyoga had sacrificed their fellow warriors to the sulfur gas. Following Hyoga's defeat and Tsukasa entering cryosleep, Ukyo is among those who join the Kingdom of Science where he becomes one of the Five Wise Generals.
Niki Hanada (花田 仁姫, Hanada Niki) / Nikkī (ニッキー)
Voiced by: Atsumi Tanezaki (Japanese); Katelyn Barr (English)
Niki is a devoted fan of Lilian Weinberg who was revived by Tsukasa. She is a tall athletic woman and has a good deal in handling others. When Senku states he has the final surviving copy of Lillian's song, Niki quickly changes sides. She is also keen on linguistics. Niki is among those who join the Kingdom of Science where she becomes part of the Power Team. She is usually the one who disciplines Magma and Yō in line if they do something short-sighted.
Yō Uei (上井陽(うえい ヨー), Uei Yō)
Voiced by: Yoshiki Nakajima (Japanese); Kyle Phillips (English)
Yō is a former police officer who was revived by Tsukasa and one of the Empire of Might members who quickly joined Senku's new Kingdom of Science as a member of the Power Team where he occasionally comes into conflict with Magma. His most noticeable feature is a massive piece of stone covering his right eye which he later removed and gave it one of Tsukasa's men when faking his death upon Chrome's escape (though the stone eyepatch reappeared on him in later appearances). Then he worked with Yuzuriha to rebuild the petrified humans that Tsukasa shattered. As a former police officer, he can use both tonfa and an expert marksman, thus being granted by Senku a gun.
François (フランソワ, Furansowa)
Voiced by: Maaya Sakamoto (Japanese); Michelle Rojas (English)
Francois is the butler and chef of Ryusui who is unsure what gender Francois is. During the "Age of Exploration" arc, Francois is revived by Senku and Ryusui to work for them after suspecting Minami was hiding some leftover revival fluid. Francois sought to cook and save provisions for the sailing crew of Perseus. Francois did the first task in culinaring bread.
Mirai Shishiō (獅子王 未来, Shishiō Mirai)
Voiced by: Manaka Iwami (Japanese); Emi Lo (English)
Mirai is the younger sister of Tsukasa. Prior to the Petrification, she was brain-dead following a car accident. During the "Communications" arc, Mirai was restored by Senku and the formula also healed Mirai. She was sad to see her brother go into cryosleep. During the "New America" arc, Mirai found that everybody lost their scars and used the Petrification Device to heal Tsukasa. She and Ruri join a fashion company together with Yuzuriha.
Sai Nanami (七海 SAI, Nanami Sai)
Voiced by: Seiichiro Yamashita^{Ep. 84 credits} (Japanese); Drew Breedlove (English)
The prodigal oldest son of Nanami Conglomerate's owner was revived by his younger brother in the "Europe" arc. Despite being an expert on video game IT who can crack algorithm codes, he ran away from his family company and fled to a university in India due to seeing Ryusui being too annoying to him before the day of the first full-scale worldwide petrification. In contrast to Ryusui, Sai is a timid and more self-conscious person. He brushes off his talent for quick mental math as nothing special. He became prone to panicking when reuniting with his brother and a world without computers. While bonding with Ryusui in a game of chess, Sai is brought to tears when the computer is finally re-crafted and agrees to tutor the two rookie scientists Chrome and Suika to build a two-way rocket plan.

=== Ishigami Village inhabitants ===
The inhabitants of Ishigami Village (石神村, Ishigami Mura) are descended from the surviving astronauts of the International Space Station who were off-world at the time when the petrification light caused all humans to be petrified. It became the headquarters of the Kingdom of Science. A village chief is chosen from whoever makes it to the final part of the Grand Bout games and wins. When a person becomes the village chief, that person is entitled to a lot of resources from Ishigami Village. Thanks to the late founder Byakuya, the legendary tales of his adoptive son Senku became very famous amongst the village's community. Besides Chrome, Kohaku, and Suika, the following are the inhabitants of Ishigami Village:

Kokuyo (コクヨウ, Kokuyō)
Voiced by: Tetsuo Kanao (Japanese); Jason Douglas (English)
A large inhabitant of Ishigami Village with a black beard and blonde hair who is the father of Kohaku and Ruri. He was the village chief of Ishigami Village at the time of Senku's reawakening and was part of Ishigami Village's older generation. In the past, Kokuyo was the one who improved the village's roppe ladder and makes the village's suspension bridge which is strong enough to withstand typhoons. While Kokuyo and Kohaku have butted heads over different things, he does care for Ruri when she was ill. When Senku wins the Ishigami Village games, he makes him the new village chief where he later acts as a co-leader. During the "Vs. Hyoga" arc, Kokuyo assisted in defending Ishigami Village from the Empire of Might fighters led by Hyoga.
Kinro (金狼(キンロー), Kinrō)
Voiced by: Tomoaki Maeno (Japanese); Jessie James Grelle (English)
One of Ishigami Village's guardsmen, a stern young man with a strong commitment to the rules eventually joined Senku's group as part of the Power Team. Like Suika, he suffers from "fuzzy sickness" with Ginro his confidant before Suika realizes it during the Ishigami games and Senku later provides his glasses in the aftermath. In addition, he also became part of the Power Team during the merging of the Kingdom of Science and the Tsukasa Empire. He loved his little brother, when he learned in both sadness and anger that Ibara had his unwitting servant Kirisame petrified Ginro and Kohaku.
Ginro (銀狼(ギンロー), Ginrō)
Voiced by: Ayumu Murase (Japanese); Justin Briner (English)
Kinro's younger brother and fellow guardsman is a frivolous young man with a tendency to panic and an overriding sense of self-interest. He rallied all his courage to assist Senku and Chrome in sampling a dose of Sulfurina (スルフリナ, Surufurina), the embodiment of the sulfuric acid required to make antibiotics for Ruri. Ginro becomes part of the Power Team.
Ruri (ルリ)
Voiced by: Reina Ueda (Japanese); Kristen McGuire (English)
Kohaku's older sister and Ishigami Village's high priestess tasked with preserving the Hundred Stories (百物語, Hyaku Monogatari) for posterity. She suffers from a debilitating illness that will likely kill her before adulthood and finding a cure becomes the first goal of Senku's "Kingdom of Science." Senku's team spent most of the first arc obtaining magnets and sulfuric acid to make an antibiotic to cure Ruri. Ruri and Senku had a short-lived marriage when he grabbed the alcohol needed for medicine. Once she is cured of what turned out to be pneumonia, she reveals to everyone including Senku that the latter is a legend amongst the village's community, all comes from the influences from one of the villagers' ancestors, who happens to be Senku's late adoptive father, Byakuya.
Kaseki (カセキ)
Voiced by: Mugihito (Japanese); Kenny Green (English)
An elderly but ripped artisan from Ishigami Village, he becomes a staunch ally and eventually a close friend of Senku and Chrome because their quest for science resonates with his passion for crafting. While having designed and built much of Ishigami Village, Kaseki used his artisan abilities to create Kohaku's shield and items from Senku's diagrams with little practice like glass, engines, and vacuum tubes. Kaseki is made unofficially to join the Craftsmanship and Development Team.
Jasper (ジャスパー, Jasupā)
Voiced by: Ryōta Takeuchi (Japanese); Patric Carroll (English)
An inhabitant of Ishigami Village who is a stickler for rules and serves as a guard for Ruri. During the "Village Games" arc, Jasper served as a match referee for the Grand Bout.
Turquoise (ターコイズ, Tākoizu)
Voiced by: Yō Taichi (Japanese); Mallorie Rodak (English)
An inhabitant of Ishigami Village. She is often seen in the company of Jasper where they both work as guards for Ruri. It is mentioned that Turquoise's whole family died during a famine. Her worries diminished once Senku's team started cultivating wheat.
Magma (マグマ, Maguma)
Voiced by: Yasuhiro Mamiya (Japanese); J. Michael Tatum (English)
An inhabitant of Ishigami Village who is the strongest of its warriors. He is most aggressive of its inhabitants and helps to defend it from attacks, having intended to take over the village before accepting Senku as their leader. As a member of the Power Team following the merging of the Kingdom of Science and the Tsukasa Empire, Magma takes a liking to Taiju due to his unlimited stamina as seen when Magma watched him tend to the fields where he did not tire out. Magma later learns he is talented in the Mathlympics.
Mantle (マントル, Mantoru)
Voiced by: Shin Matsushige (Japanese); Sonny Strait (English)
An inhabitant of Ishigami Village with dwarfism who idolizes Magma and does his dirty work.
Soyuz (ソユーズ, Soyūzu)
Voiced by: Taito Ban (Japanese); Aaron Roberts (English)
A bald-headed inhabitant of Ishigami Village with great photographic memory and a member of the Power Team. He is often shown shirtless, has an X-scar on top of his head, and is always barefoot. As a baby, Soyuz was originally from an island that Senku named "Treasure Island" before he was cast off, presumably sometime after surviving a hostile takeover caused by Ibara. Soyuz is the son of the leader of his birth kingdom whom Ibara petrified. Following Senku defeating Ibara, Soyuz became the new leader of the Petrification Kingdom.
Ganen (ガンエン, Gan'en)
Voiced by: Genki Muro (Japanese); Travis Mullenix (English)
A fat inhabitant of Ishigami Village who is a residential glutton. He was starting to get tired of fish every day until Senku managed to recreate ramen.
Sagan (サガン, Sagan)
Voiced by: Ryō Sugisaki (Japanese); Chris Rager (English)
An inhabitant of Ishigami Village who is the father of Ganen. He is shown to be strong enough to carry two large pots. While often seen surrounded by corked pots, it is implied that Sagan is in charge of the fermentation and storage of Ishigami Village's food.
En (エン, En)
Voiced by: Kyō Yaoya (Japanese); Heather Walker (English)
An inhabitant of Ishigami Village who is the mother of Ganen and the wife of Sagan.
Alabaster (アラバスタ, Arabasuta)
Voiced by: Hiroki Maeda (Japanese); Jeffrey Schmidt (English)
An inhabitant of Ishigami Village who is a skilled boatman as seen when he was partaking in a fishing detail.
Dia (ダイヤ, Daia)
An inhabitant of Ishigami Village who is the wife of Alabaster.
Ruby (ルビィ, Rubī)
Voiced by: Reina Kondō (Japanese); Macy Anne Johnson (English)
An inhabitant of Ishigami Village with black hair who is the daughter of Alabaster and Dia and the sister of Garnet and Sapphire. She and her sisters are described by Kohaku to be the prettiest girls in Ishigami Village.
Hagane (ハグネ, Hagane)
Voiced by: Noriyuki Tsuyuki (Japanese); Bryan Massey (English)
An inhabitant of Ishigami Village who fights with an axe. He lost to Magma during the Grand Bout.
Argo (アルゴ, Arugo)
Voiced by: Yasuaki Takumi (Japanese); Mike McFarland (English)
A serious inhabitant of Ishigami Village who wields a double-ended staff capped with boxing glove-like covers and is prone to being distracted. During the Grand Bout, Argo was defeated by Ginro. During the "Communications Arc", Argo is among the villagers that watch Senku provide a distraction tactic on Homura.
Tetsuken (鉄犬, Tetsuken)
An inhabitant of Ishigami Village who is the father of Ginro and Kinro. He works as one of the village's guardsmen. In the anime version, he watches the Grand Bout.
Shirogane (白金, Shirogane)
An inhabitant of Ishigami Village who is the wife of Tetsuken and the mother of Ginro and Kinro.
Carbo (カーボ, Kaabo)
Voiced by: Shogo Sakata (Japanese); Kyle Igneczi (English)
An inhabitant of Ishigami Village who once accompanied Magma and Mantle in dealing with an "outside sorcerer".
Beryl (ベリ—, Berī)
An inhabitant of Ishigami Village and the wife of Carbo.
Natri (なとリ, Natori)
Voiced by: Yasuhiro Kikuchi (Japanese); Charles C. Campbell (English)
An elderly inhabitant of Ishigami Village who is the father of Carbo.
Alumi (あるみ, Arumi)
Voiced by: Hitomi Shigawa (Japanese); Cynthia Cranz (English)
An elderly inhabitant of Ishigami Village who is the wife of Natri and the mother of Carbo.
Titan (チタン, Chitan)
Voiced by: Kentarō Kumagai (Japanese); Jordan Dash Cruz (English)
A jovial inhabitant of Ishigami Village who works as one of the village's guardsmen.
Unmo (ウンも, Unmo)
Voiced by: Yūya Murakami (Japanese); Josh Martin (English)
A balding overweight inhabitant of Ishigami Village who is an expert drummer as seen when he plays the drums during the Grand Bout. He is also shown to be capable of wielding an axe.
Shovel (シャベル, Shaberu)
Voiced by: Sayumi Suzushiro (Japanese); Dani Chambers (English)
A young inhabitant of Ishigami Village who runs around informing everyone of what's happening near the village.
Namari (ナマリ, Namari)
A young inhabitant of Ishigami Village who is a skilled artist.
Sho (礁, Shō)
Voiced by: Kōichi Sōma (Japanese); Howard Wang (English)
An older inhabitant of Ishigami Village who is an expert fisherman.
Sango (珊瑚, Sango)
An inhabitant of Ishigami Village who is the wife of Sho. In the anime, she is shown to be an expert at laundry work.
Azura (あずら, Azura)
Voiced by: Shion Wakayama (Japanese); Meg McClain (English)
A young inhabitant of Ishigami Village. In the anime, she is shown to be an expert at laundry work. At one point, Azura was among the inhabitants that roped into helping to recreate ramen.
Chalk (チョーク, Chōku)
Voiced by: Sayumi Suzushiro (Japanese); Monica Rial (English)
Chalk is a Shiba Inu in Ishigami Village that is owned by Suika.
Sagara (サガラ)
Voiced by: Naoko Komatsu (Japanese); Meg McClain (English)
Sagara is a Japanese boar that is adopted by Suika. He came in handy when it came to finding some oil.

=== Petrification Kingdom ===
The Petrification Kingdom (石化王国, Sekka ōkoku) is a kingdom that is located on Treasure Island. Its inhabitants are the descendants of the International Space Station crew. Soyuz came from this island as he was the son of the unnamed leader.

Ibara (イバラ)
Voiced by: Yutaka Aoyama (Japanese); Larry Brantley (English)
Ibara is the sociopathic, selfish, perverted, and paranoid Minister of the Petrification Kingdom until he usurped the unnamed ruler who was Soyuz's father and used the Petrification Device to petrify him and punish eyewitnesses or outsiders that would put his treachery at risk. When Senku arrived on the island, Ibara became determined to kill or petrify him and his friends due to being threatened by their advancements and being outside his control and authority, with Senku and Ryusui getting into a tug-of-war with Ibara. Thanks to a trick that Ryusui planned out, Senku used the voice com to frighten Ibara and use the Petrification Device on him. This enabled Soyuz to become the new ruler of the Petrification Kingdom. Ibara is the only villain Senku is not willing to pardon, leaving him left to be petrified by those he deceived and oppressed.
Amaryllis (アマリリス, Amaririsu)
Voiced by: Saori Ōnishi (Japanese); Leah Clark (English)
Amaryllis is the most beautiful inhabitant of the Petrification Kingdom. She is skilled in gathering ingredients for food and cosmetics. Five years ago, she and some kids tried to leave the island but were stopped by Moz and Kirisame. Amaryllis sides with Senku regarding his plans to overthrow Ibara only for Ibara to use the Petrification Device on everyone. Upon being restored after Senku defeated Ibara, Amaryllis assists Soyuz in restoring the people of the Petrification Kingdom.
Kirisame (キリサメ)
Voiced by: Kaede Hondo (Japanese); Lindsay Seidel (English)
Kirisame is a female chief of the Petrification Kingdom who is one of the two strongest warriors. In her first appearance, she was responsible for the petrification of the Perseus' crew. Kirisame is the first to suspect something off about Ibara's intentions of petrifying the whole island and is outraged when the truth comes to light. After Senku defeated Ibara, Kirisame was among those who restored and recognized Soyuz as Treasure Island's new ruler. Kirisame later joins up with the Kingdom of Science.
Matsukaze (松風)
Voiced by: Yōhei Azakami (Japanese); Alejandro Saab (English)
Matsukaze is a samurai of the Petrification Kingdom who petrified himself centuries ago in the event in which many Petrification Weapons fell from the sky. At some point, his petrified body ended up in the sea and was collected by Taiju. Matsukaze was left petrified from missing an arm. When his arm was salvaged and reattached, Matsukaze is restored and saw that Ginro resembled his late master. He joins the Kingdom of Science where he becomes Ginro's bodyguard.
Oarashi (オオアラシ, Ōarashi)
Voiced by: Taiten Kusunoki (Japanese); Jarrod Greene (English)
Oarashi is a muscular man of the Petrification Kingdom who sports a jackal headdress. While he is strong enough to throw Magma and Kinro, he is no match for Taiju.
Moz (モズ, Mozu)
Voiced by: Kazuyuki Okitsu (Japanese); Reagan Murdock (English)
Moz is an inhabitant of the Petrification Kingdom and is one of the two strongest warriors. Because of this, he believed himself to be naturally talented at fighting, so he preferred to slack around rather than hone his skills. He has a soft side for girls he finds beautiful or strong like Amaryllis and Kohaku. Moz briefly comes to terms with Senku's allies. Following Ibara's defeat, Moz is restored by Senku at Hyoga's behest and he joins up with the Kingdom of Science.

=== American Colony ===
Dr. Xeno Houston Wingfield (Dr.(ドクター) ゼノ・ヒューストン・ウィングフィールド, Dokutā Zeno Hyūsuton Wingufīrudo)
Voiced by: Kenji Nojima (Japanese); John Burgmeier (English)
A former NASA scientist, Dr. Xeno is the leader of the colony formed in the United States and is a scientific genius on par with Senku.
Stanley Snyder (スタンリー・スナイダー, Sutanrī Sunaidā)
Voiced by: Kōji Yusa (Japanese); Robert McCollum (English)
Stanley Snyder is a military operative and Dr. Xeno's second-in-command.
Maya Biggs (マヤ・ビッグス, Maya Biggusu)
Voiced by: Mariko Higashiuchi (Japanese); Dani Chambers (English)
A former military officer and women's MMA champion who works for Xeno.
Brody Dudley (ブロディ・ダドリー, Burodi Dadorī)
Voiced by: Hiroki Yasumoto (Japanese); William Ofoegbu (English)
Brody Dudley is a military officer and the mechanic of the American colony.
Luna Wright (ルーナ・ライト, Rūna Raito)
Voiced by: Akira Sekine (Japanese); Alexis Tipton (English)
A medical student who shifted allegiance to the Kingdom of Science and wanted the chance to date the young scientist Senku.
Carlos Barrios (カルロス・バリオス, Karurosu Bariosu)
Voiced by: Chiharu Sawashiro (Japanese); Mauricio Ortiz-Segura (English)
A chauffeur to Luna's father. He kept a platinum ring in his mouth as a time capsule that Xeno would use to build his army thousands of years later.
Max Adams (マックス・アダムス, Makkusu Adamusu)
Voiced by: Taishi Murata
A man who works as a bodyguard to Luna and refuses to let her die single.
Charlotte Bony (シャーロット・ボニー, Shārotto Bonī)
Voiced by: Minami Hinata
A military pilot who idolizes Stanley.
Chelsea Childe (チェルシー・チャイルド, Cherushī Chairudo)
Voiced by: Megumi Han
A geographer who was found alone in North America. Like Suika, Chelsea has the "fuzzy sickness". She wears a pumpkin for a hat and finds the expedition team more fun.
Joel Gear (ジョエル・ギア, Jyoeru Gia)
Voiced by: Yuki Sakakihara
A watchmaker that was revived to take apart the Petrification Weapon and see what makes it tick. Devoted to his work, he had less time coping with girls.

== Other characters ==
Why-Man (ホワイマン, Howaiman)
Voiced by: Koichi Yamadera, Kotono Mitsuishi, Kōhei Amasaki, and Kana Hanazawa
Why-Man is the name attributed to the perpetrator petrifying humanity from the surface of the Moon by Ryusui, following their repeated questions to Senku's group on "why" they still live. Why-Man is in reality the consciousness of all the sentient petrification devices that roamed the galaxy for eons in search of a species that could help sustain them. By petrifying humanity, they believed they gifted eternal life to them so they could help maintain the devices. Following Senku's visit and negotiation, all but one device agree to leave humanity behind to search for other beings to work with while the one stays behind to study humanity.

=== International Space Station crew ===
Astronauts on the International Space Station at the time when the people of Earth were petrified.

Byakuya Ishigami (石神 百夜, Ishigami Byakuya)
Voiced by: Keiji Fujiwara (first voice), Satoshi Mikami (second voice) (Japanese); Kent Williams (English)
Byakuya is the adoptive father of Senku, a former teacher, and one of the astronauts on the International Space Station at the time when the people of Earth were petrified. When he and his fellow astronauts returned to Earth and found what happened, Byakuya led them into establishing Ishigami Village. In addition, Byakuya spent the rest of his natural life panning for Platinum which can be used by Senku when he finally becomes unpetrified to rapidly produce the Revival fluid. By the time Senku woke up, Byakuya was long dead. In the "Village Origins" arc, Senku found a time capsule disk from a glass bottle that Byakuya left him after learning from the Hundred Tales. At the end of 4D manga, it is shown that Why-Man petrified the elderly Byakuya which will prove the existence of time-traveling and a sign of atonement on his part.
Lillian Weinberg (リリアン・ワインバーグ, Ririan Wainbāgu)
Voiced by: Lynn (Japanese); Caitlin Glass (English); Laura Pitt-Pulford (singing voice; both languages)
Lillian Weinberg was an American pop music star who was one of the astronauts on the International Space Station at the time when the people of Earth were petrified. They are the ancestors of people from Ishigami Village. She has blonde hair which got passed down to some of her descendants. Lillian fell ill due to pneumonia and died in the process, thus ending her soothing voice and music career. The only thing she left behind was the song Byakuya recorded in the time capsule glass disc.
Connie Lee (コニー・リー, Konī Rī)
Voiced by: Hisako Kanemoto (Japanese); Erica Mendez (English)
Connie Lee was a NASA personnel who was one of the astronauts on the International Space Station at the time when the people of Earth were petrified. She and Shamil started a relationship and then got married. Connie fell ill due to pneumonia and died in the process.
Shamil Volkov (シャミール・ヴォルコフ, Shamīru Vorukofu) (Шамил Волков)
Voiced by: Showtaro Morikubo (Japanese); Patrick Seitz (English)
Shamil Volkov was a Russian cosmonaut, a former pilot, and husband of Connie Lee who was one of the astronauts on the International Space Station at the time when the people of Earth were petrified. He helped to establish Ishigami Village. Shamil fell ill due to pneumonia and died in the process.
Darya Nikitina (ダリヤ・ニキーチナ, Dariya Nikīchina) (Дария Никитина)
Voiced by: Rie Tanaka (Japanese); Rachel Robinson (English)
Darya Nikitina was a Russian cosmonaut and doctor who was one of the astronauts on the International Space Station at the time when the people of Earth were petrified. She and her husband were lost at sea while trying to get medicine for Connie.
Yakov Nikitin (ヤコフ・ニキーチン, Yakofu Nikīchin) (Яков Никитин)
Voiced by: Kanehira Yamamoto (Japanese); Mike Pollock (English)
Yakov Nikitin was a Russian cosmonaut, doctor, and husband of Darya Nikitina who was one of the astronauts on the International Space Station at the time when the people of Earth were petrified. He and his wife were lost at sea while trying to get medicine for Connie.
