= Primal Force =

Publication information
- Publisher: DC Comics
- Schedule: Monthly
- Format: Ongoing while in publication
- Publication date: October 1994 – December 1995
- No. of issues: 15

Creative team
- Created by: Steven Seagle; Ken Hooper

Primal Force is a comic book series published by DC Comics from October 1994 to December 1995 and ran for 15 issues. The series starred the Leymen, a magic-themed superhero team in the DC Universe. The series premiered with Primal Force #0 (October 1994; the "zero" issue number is a result of the Zero Hour: Crisis in Time! crossover event during which the series debuted) and ended with issue #14 (December 1995).

== Members ==
- Doctor Mist – the team leader; a.k.a. Maltis or Nommo
- Claw – Young John Chan was the second man to bear the name the Claw.
- Golem
- Jack O'Lantern
- Meridian
- Red Tornado
- Black Condor – joined in Primal Force #7
- Will Power – joined in Primal Force #7
- Noir – joined (and died) in Primal Force #12
