= Freedom Beast =

Fictional comic book character

- Freedom Beast by Chas Truog

Publication information
- Publisher: DC Comics
- First appearance: Animal Man #13 (July 1989)
- Created by: Grant Morrison

In-story information
- Full name: Dominic Mndawe
- Species: Metahuman
- Team affiliations: Global Guardians; Justice League
- Abilities: Super strength; Healing factor; Animal control and fusion

Freedom Beast (Dominic Mndawe) is a fictional comic book character appearing in American comic books published by DC Comics.

The character made his live-action debut in the fourth season of the HBO Max series Titans, portrayed by Nyambi Nyambi.

== Fictional character biography ==
Freedom Beast was born Dominic Mndawe in South Africa. His first appearance was in Animal Man #13 which occurs during the era of apartheid in South Africa. Dominic was under arrest for taking pictures of racially motivated acts of violence being committed by white Afrikaner policemen. In a cell, Dominic was about to be killed by his captors when he is rescued by Animal Man and B'wana Beast (Mike Maxwell), Mndawe's predecessor and future mentor. After the rescue, Maxwell gives Mndawe the elixir and helmet that confer powers on their owner. The two briefly had a disagreement as Mndawe was adamant to continue his political resistance to the South African government and its policy of apartheid with while Maxwell was insistent that the calling is apolitical. However, they eventually reconciled on this point. Mndawe continued pursuing his political objectives which he justified with the personal maxim, "Today's politics is tomorrow's mythology". Animal Man and Freedom Beast then prevent the massacre of a group of peaceful demonstrators by Afrikaner police. Animal Man returns to the US, while Maxwell and Freedom Beast remain in South Africa.

Freedom Beast appears in the Day of Vengeance Infinite Crisis special, in which he is possessed by Rage, one of the seven deadly sins. In Green Lantern, Freedom Beast appears as South Africa's representative in the reformed Global Guardians.

In Justice League: Cry for Justice, Freedom Beast is killed by minions of Prometheus. Dominic's partner Congorilla discovers his dying friend and vows to find justice for his murder. Prometheus is subsequently killed by Green Arrow who avenges his death.

Congorilla mentions that he still has Dominic's helmet and elixir in his possession. Seeking to honor the memory of his old friend, Congorilla resigns from the Justice League and goes to find a worthy candidate to become the new Freedom Beast.

=== The New 52 ===
In 2011, "The New 52" rebooted the DC universe. Freedom Beast is alive, making his debut when he comes to America to take down a hunting club that has created a synthetic version of his elixir. He teams with Midnighter to free the captured animals and bring down the hunters.

== Powers and abilities ==
Freedom Beast drinks an elixir that gives him superhuman strength, speed, hunting and tracking abilities. He also wears an ancient helmet that allows him to communicate with animals and merge them to form chimeras.

== In other media ==
Freedom Beast appears in the Titans episode "Dude, Where's My Gar?", portrayed by Nyambi Nyambi. This version lost his sister and her children to a disease made by scientists associated with the Chief.

== See also ==
- African characters in comics
