= Godiva (comics) =

- Dorcas Leigh as Godiva drawn by John Byrne in Superman (vol. 2) #13.

Publication information
- Publisher: DC Comics
- First appearance: Super Friends #7 (1977)
- Created by: E. Nelson Bridwell

In-story information
- Alter ego: Dorcas Leigh, later Dora Leigh (The New 52)
- Team affiliations: Global Guardians; Justice League; Justice League International
- Abilities: Prehensile hair

Godiva is the name of three DC Comics characters. One is a superhero named Dorcas Leigh, while the other two are supervillains.

Godiva (Dorcas Leigh) is a British metahuman who possesses prehensile hair. She was introduced in the Super Friends tie-in comic as a member of the Global Guardians. She was later added to the mainstream continuity, and later in the New 52 as a member of Justice League International.

== Publication history ==
Godiva (Dorcas Leigh) first appeared in Super Friends #7 and was created by E. Nelson Bridwell. She first appears in the mainstream continuity in Crisis on Infinite Earths #12 (March, 1986) and in the New 52 in Justice League International (Vol. 3) #1 (November, 2011) as Dora Leigh.

The Teen Titans villain first appeared in New Teen Titans Annual (Vol. 2) #3 (November, 1987), and the Axis of Evil member appeared solely in Superman/Batman #20 (June, 2005).

== Fictional character biography ==
Dorcas Leigh is a socialite from the United Kingdom with the power to control her hair's movement. Her first mission was to assist the Elongated Man in dismantling a bomb near London. Later on, she helped Wonder Woman find the Queen Bee. She later helps Jack O'Lantern in Crisis on Infinite Earths and assists Superman in a confrontation with Toyman.

Much later, along with other Global Guardians, Godiva is brainwashed by Queen Bee, the dictator of Bialya. While brainwashed, she and her team help the Justice League Europe battle a giant alien robot. This, unknown to the heroes, was part of a plan to increase the Guardians' standing in the eyes of the public.

Sumaan Harjavti, the brother of the man Queen Bee deposed, makes a move to take control of Bialya. Several fired members of the League infiltrate the country and confront the Guardians, who break free from Queen Bee's control. Queen Bee is shot to death by Harjavti, who takes control of Bialya.

In JSA Classified , Godiva is revealed to have been kidnapped as part of an operation that steals the organs of metahumans. Her hair is surgically removed from her scalp under the directive of a mentally disturbed Delores Winters, leaving her bald and powerless.

In The New 52 rebooted DC's continuity, Godiva is renamed to Dora Leigh. Godiva is one of the members of the relaunched Justice League International.

== Powers and abilities ==
Godiva has prehensile hair. She can perform precise actions such as lock-picking and lift up to two tons.

== Other characters named Godiva ==
=== Teen Titans villain ===
Godiva is a mercenary and enemy of the Teen Titans. Her base of operations is in the Swiss Alps.

=== Superman/Batman villain ===
Another Godiva appeared in Superman/Batman #20 as a member of an alternate universe team of villains called the Axis of Evil. She can hold anyone to her will, regardless of sexual orientation.

== Other versions ==
An alternate universe version of Godiva appears in Flashpoint.

== In other media ==
Godiva makes a non-speaking cameo appearance in Justice League: The Flashpoint Paradox.
