= Maxi-Man =

- Maxi-Man (Hayes) debuts in Mister Miracle #9 (October 1989).

Publication information
- Publisher: DC Comics
- First appearance: (Henry Hayes); Mister Miracle (vol. 2) #9 (October 1989) (Second); Wonder Woman (vol. 3) #6 (May 2007)
- Created by: (Hayes); Len Wein, Joe Phillips (Second); Jodi Picoult, Drew Johnson

In-story information
- Alter ego: Henry Hayes; Unknown
- Abilities: (both) Superstrength; superspeed; superhuman endurance

Maxi-Man is the name of two DC Comics heroes. The first was created by Len Wein and Joe Phillips and first appeared in Mister Miracle (vol. 2) #9 (October 1989). The second was created by Jodi Picoult and Drew Johnson and first appeared in Wonder Woman (vol. 3) #6 (May 2007).

== Fictional character biography ==
=== Henry Hayes ===
Henry Hayes is an advertiser who gains superpowers after being exposed to the Dominators' gene bomb and given adrenaline to save his life. He joins Booster Gold's corporate hero team, The Conglomerate, before leaving them after the group's liaison Thrunctuous works with Hector Hammond to discredit them.. However, Maxi-Man continues working as an adventurer before being killed in Roulette's gladiatorial games.

=== Maxi-Man successor ===
Maxi-Man from Wonder Woman (vol. 3) #6 (May 2007).

A new Maxi-Man appeared briefly in 2007. The second Maxi-Man became a hero after winning a reality TV show, and possesses identical powers to the original.
