= Doctor Mist =

- Doctor Mist from Truth and Justice #3, art by ChrisCross, Jordi Tarragona, and Wil Quintana.

Publication information
- Publisher: DC Comics
- First appearance: Super Friends #12 (June 1978)
- Created by: E. Nelson Bridwell (writer); Ramona Fradon (artist)

In-story information
- Alter ego: Nommo; Nommo Balewa (current)
- Species: Homo Magi
- Place of origin: Kor
- Team affiliations: Global Guardians; Leymen; A.R.G.U.S. Justice League Dark; Justice League; Deserters Tribe
- Partnerships: Belphegor (apprentice)
- Supporting character of: Vixen
- Notable aliases: Maltis
- Abilities: Mystical abilities in which includes immortality, spell-casting, and illusion creating; profound occult knowledge and able hand-to-hand combatant.

Doctor Mist is a fictional superhero, and antihero published by DC Comics. He was created by E. Nelson Bridwell and Ramona Fradon, first appearing in a cameo in Super Friends #12 (June–July 1978). Hailing from the mythical realm of Kor, Nommo is a famous African king and guardian of the magical source known as the Mystical Flame of Life until an encounter with Felix Faust robbed him of his power after defeating the rogue sorcerer. Ultimately, the character became a superhero in the 1980s, founding the Leymen and then the Global Guardians.

After the events of Flashpoint, the character was revamped as Nommo Balewa, a South African doctor who seemingly adopted his heroic name in modern times shortly after turning to magic to attempted to save his wife during a civil war. In DC Rebirth, the character's original history and connection was restored along with being descended from the Deserters of ancient Atlantis, continuing to lead the Global Guardians as a pro-active group intercepting threats before they require the attention of more well-known hero strike teams such as the Justice League.

Charles Parnell portrays Doctor Mist in Constantine.

== Publication history ==
Doctor Mist has appeared in the pages of Super Friends, DC Comics Presents, Infinity, Inc., Justice League International, Justice League Quarterly, Blue Beetle, and Primal Force.

== Fictional character biography ==
Nommo, the wizard-king of the African empire of Kor, stood in the Pillar of Life and was endowed with immortality. He later took the name Doctor Mist.

Doctor Mist gathers a number of international heroes to help the Super Friends battle the Conqueror. Later, Superman teams with several international heroes at Doctor Mist's request. He is the one who first gives them the name the Global Guardians. Superman and several of the Guardians would team up to fight against the threat of Thaumar Dhai and the squad of powerful wizards who worship him. Dhai was defeated when his objects of power turned out to be Superman-created fakeries. The team later fights against the Shadow Demons in Crisis on Infinite Earths.

In post-Crisis continuity, Doctor Mist established the Global Guardians to serve as a task force for the Dome, a supranational police organization. The Global Guardians split up after the United Nations decides to shut down the Dome and fund Justice League International instead. Queen Bee reestablishes a version of the Dome and brainwashes the Global Guardians into her service. Doctor Mist recruits a team to rescue the Guardians from Queen Bee's mind control and then reforms the Global Guardians, building a new Dome headquarters somewhere in the Pacific.

Mist's physical body was killed by an ancient force. Despite this, he appears alive following the Zero Hour: Crisis in Time! event. Calling himself Maltis, he forms a new team of heroes known as the Leymen. Maltis is later killed after being thrown into a pool of acid by Mordru.

=== The New 52 ===
In The New 52 continuity reboot, Steve Trevor first mentions Mist as a government operative, having a hand in watching the Black Room, a secretive government vault where mystical artifacts are stored. Trevor sends Justice League Dark to rescue Mist after he is captured while infiltrating Felix Faust's cult in South America. Mist is later revealed to be a double agent who is working to get Faust into the Black Room. In return, Faust promises to resurrect Mist's deceased wife.

== Powers and abilities ==
Doctor Mist is a sorcerer whose powers stem from his connection with the mystical source known as the Flame of Life. This contact has granted him a range of sorcerous abilities, including the manipulation of illusions, altering reality, summoning creatures, conjuring objects, enchantments, and immortality. While proficient in the art of sorcery, Doctor Mist chooses to operate from behind the scenes, employing duplicity to cultivate an image of greater power and mystery. Additionally, he possesses above-average skills in hand-to-hand combat and possesses the leadership qualities and accumulated wealth necessary to establish and lead both his own kingdom and later his own superhero team.

Mist wields the Ruby of Life, a magical artifact which grants the bearer the ability to exert magical control over anything they touch. He later relinquishes the ruby, which is given to Sargon.

== In other media ==
- Doctor Mist appears in the Constantine episode "A Feast of Friends", portrayed by Charles Parnell.
- Doctor Mist makes a cameo appearance in a magazine cover depicted in the Powerless episode "I'ma Friend You".

== See also ==
- African characters in comics
