= Tuatara (character) =

- The Jeremy Wakefield incarnation of Tuatara as depicted in Super Friends #8 (November 1977). Art by Ramona Fradon.

Publication information
- Publisher: DC Comics
- First appearance: Super Friends #8 (November 1977)
- Created by: E. Nelson Bridwell (script); Ramona Fradon (art)

In-story information
- Alter ego: Jeremy Wakefield
- Team affiliations: Global Guardians; Justice League
- Abilities: Prognostication

Tuatara is the name of two different characters appearing in comic books published by DC Comics.

== Fictional character biography ==
=== Jeremy Wakefield ===
Tuatara's first appearance took place in Super Friends #8 (November 1977), which is set outside the mainstream DC Comics continuity. Jeremy Wakefield is a young New Zealander who can see into the fourth dimension of time using his third eye. He thus named himself after the tuatara, a reptile with a parietal eye or "third eye". In his first mission, he helped the Red Tornado dismantle a bomb in the Prehistoric Era. After aiding the Super Friends in battling a time menace, Tuatura becomes a member of the Global Guardians.

Tuatara's first mainstream appearance was in Justice League International #12 (April 1988). Following his introduction, Tuatara and the Global Guardians are brainwashed by Queen Bee and sent to attack Nazi strongholds and the Justice League. Tuatara battles League members Metamorpho, Elongated Man and Flash before being rendered comatose.

Tuatara is taken care of at an Australian medical facility that is sponsored by the Justice League. Shortly before he is to be transferred to the Justice League International's medical ward, Queen Bee sends a signal to awaken him. Tuatara returns to Bialya, along with Rising Sun and Wild Huntsman, who awakened at the same time as him. All three are brainwashed before being freed after battles with the Justice League and the other Guardians.

Following The New 52 and DC Rebirth relaunches, Tuatara is reintroduced during the Absolute Power event in 2024. He joins the Justice League in the series Justice League Unlimited.

=== Tuatara (Silicon Syndicate) ===
A second Tuatara appears as an associate of the Silicon Syndicate. He is a villain with reptilian powers.

== Powers and abilities ==
Tuatara is a mutant born with three eyes. This enables him to see into the past and future, allowing him to prevent events before they occur.
