= List of DC Comics characters: I =

== I.Q. ==
I.Q. (Ira Quimby) is a fictional character appearing in American comic books published by DC Comics.

Ira Quimby is a small-time crook who is accidentally exposed to the radiation from a rock that had been irradiated by a Zeta Beam, transforming him into a metahuman with superhuman intelligence. Dubbing himself I.Q., he uses his new intellect to plan a series of jewelry heists. I.Q.'s heightened intelligence turns out to short-lived, but re-exposure to the rock restores it. I.Q. later discovers that his heightened intelligence returns whenever he is exposed to sunlight.

In 52, I.Q. is revealed as one of the "mad scientists" kidnapped by Chang Tzu and Intergang, and taken to Oolong Island to become a member of the Science Squad. When Black Adam attacks Oolong Island, he remained collected and rallies his fellow mad scientists to successfully defeat Adam. He subsequently becomes the head of projects on the island.

== Ice Man ==
Ice Man is the name of two characters appearing in American comic books published by DC Comics.

=== Plastic Man villain ===
The Ice Man was an unnamed ice delivery man who went rogue when refrigerators were invented and fought Plastic Man.

=== L.E.G.I.O.N. villain ===
The second Ice Man is an alien mercenary who can manipulate energy and heat. In Underworld Unleashed, he sells his soul to Neron in exchange for increased powers before being killed by him.

== Impala ==
Impala is the name of two characters appearing in American comic books published by DC Comics.

=== Impala ===
Impala (M'Bulaze) is a politically minded Zulu warrior from South Africa. He helped the Flash dismantle a bomb in South Africa. After the events of Flashpoint, a rebooted version of Impala appeared with a new alter ego, Charles Mokose. While still retaining his previous power set, the nature of his abilities are described as "totemic" similarly to Vixen and her Tantu Totem. He also retains his membership into the Global Guardians, whose objective is to investigate problematic beings and objects of power and intervene before they warrant the attention of the Justice League.

=== Kid Impala ===
Kid Impala is a member of the Ultramarine Corps who first appeared in the Neh-Buh-Loh storyline from JLA: Classified #2. He later travels to a dystopian pocket universe called 'Qwewq' with the rest of the Ultramarines.

== Incubus ==
Incubus is a demonic entity, the son of Azhmodeus and brother to the Succubus, that managed to conquer the Nightshade Dimension. However, he was killed due to the death his host by the Suicide Squad during a plot to place the Succubus possessing the Enchantress into another body to mate with his own sibling.

=== Incubus in other media ===
Incubus appears in Suicide Squad, portrayed by Alain Chanoine.

== Insomnia ==
Insomnia, also known as Christopher Lukas, is a fictional character appearing in comic books published by DC Comics. Insomnia first appeared in an unnamed cameo appearance in Lazarus Planet: Dark Fate #1 (February 2023), before being fully revealed in Knight Terrors Special Edition #1 (May 2023).

Insomnia is the main antagonist of Knight Terrors, in which he traps many heroes and villains in nightmares while searching for Doctor Destiny's Dreamstone.

== Invisible Destroyer ==
Invisible Destroyer is a character appearing in American comic books published by DC Comics.

When Martin Phillips was unconscious, a being called the Invisible Destroyer manifested into reality. He fought Green Lantern who managed to apparently vanquish Invisible Destroyer. The Invisible Destroyer later appears alive and joins Alexander Luthor Jr.'s Secret Society of Super Villains.

== Ishmael ==
Ishmael is the name of several characters appearing in American comic books published by DC Comics.

=== Black Lightning villain ===
The first Ishmael is a criminal who, alongside his brother Queequeg, is a shapeshifter. Both of them work for Tobias Whale. Ishmael is instructed to pose as the Gangbuster and assassinate the organizer of the gang piece summit. Black Lightning figured out who the impostor Gangbuster was. Ishmael and Queequeg were defeated by Black Lightning and the Gangbuster.

=== League of Assassins version ===
The second Ishmael is a destitute man who was abducted and used for the experiments of the Ark Project. He joined the League of Assassins after Ra's al Ghul used a Lazarus Pit to save him from the lethal side effects of the experimentation.

=== Ishmael in other media ===
The second incarnation of Ishmael appears in Black Lightning, portrayed by Rico Ball. This version is an assassin who must kill 100 metahumans in order to get into the League of Assassins.

== Isis ==
Isis is the name of several characters appearing in American comic books published by DC Comics.

=== Egyptian goddess ===
The second Isis is an adaptation of the Egyptian deity of the same name.

=== Isis (Selina Kyle's cat) ===
Isis is Selina Kyle's pet cat, who often assists in her heists. Created for Batman: The Animated Series, Isis debuted in the first aired episode of the series, "The Cat and the Claw" (September 1992). Her vocal effects are primarily provided by Frank Welker in Batman: The Animated Series and by Dee Bradley Baker in Gotham Girls.

=== Isis in other media ===
- Isis the cat appears in Krypto the Superdog, voiced by Kathleen Barr.
- Isis the cat appears in Injustice: Gods Among Us.
