= International Ultramarine Corps =

Fictional characters

- International Ultramarine Corps from JLA Secret Files 2004 #1, artists: Ed McGuiness & Dexter Vines.

Publication information
- Publisher: DC Comics
- First appearance: DC One Million #2 (November 1998)
- Created by: Grant Morrison (writer); Howard Porter (artist)

In-story information
- Base(s): Superbia
- Member(s): Warmaker One; Flow; 4-D; Pulse 8 Goraiko; Knight; Squire; Kid Impala; Jack O'Lantern; Vixen; Olympian

The International Ultramarine Corps, formerly the Ultramarine Corps, is a fictional team of superheroes published by DC Comics. They first appeared in DC One Million #2 (November 1998), and were created by Grant Morrison and Howard Porter.

== History ==
The Corps was created by the US federal government as a government-sponsored group of superhumans, in contrast to the more independent Justice League. Led by General Wade Eiling, the original members of the team were Flow, 4-D, Pulse 8, and Warmaker One.

During a fight with the JLA, the UMC realizes that Eiling is dangerously insane and sides with the League against him. Having developed a mistrust of governments, the Corps become an independent group and build Superbia, a free-floating city above Montevideo.

With the Justice League mysteriously absent, the Corps responds to an attack by Gorilla Grodd on Kinshasa. Unknown to them, this is actually a preliminary incursion by the dimension-hopping Sheeda. Superbia is knocked out of the sky, causing many casualties to both the onboard population and Montevideo. A number of the Corps are killed by Grodd and the Sheeda, led by Nebula Man. The Corps are rescued by the Justice League, who have returned from the pocket universe of Qwewq. Disgraced, the Corps are on the verge of disbanding when Superman suggests that its members move to Qwewq and act as its defenders.

The group is last seen in the storyline Final Crisis, where Darkseid attacks Superbia. Superbia later falls from the sky after an aerial attack disables it.

== Founding membership ==
=== Warmaker One ===
Lieutenant Colonel Scott Sawyer is made of energy which phases out of normal reality, and as such is contained in a high-tech suit of powered armor. His armor is equipped with rockets, a one-shot bullet with a "clean" nuclear warhead, and transmitters that "broadcast" sounds and other sensory information, enabling him to overload Superman's super-senses.

=== Flow ===
Major Dan Stone is a creature of living water. In later appearances, Flow becomes more monstrous and becomes known as Glob.

=== 4-D ===
Captain Lea Corben is able to become four-, three-, two-, or one-dimensional at will, making her difficult to capture and confine. In addition, she is able to draw power "from other dimensions and bring it into the Third Dimension" and use it to supercharge her attacks, allowing her to knock out powerful beings such as Wonder Woman with a single blow.

=== Pulse 8 ===
Captain John Wether was originally known as Pulse 8 and had control over the fundamental forces of the universe, such as gravity, electromagnetism and the like. His later appearance as The Master shows him rewriting reality using a "Quantum Keyboard".

== Later membership ==
=== The Knight ===
Cyril Sheldrake is an English hero who takes after his inspiration Batman. Sheldrake is the second Knight, and served under the original Knight (his father, the Earl of Wordenshire) as Squire. Sheldrake has a rather coarse attitude, and engages in friendly but politically incorrect banter with the Irish Jack O'Lantern.

=== Squire ===
Squire is Beryl Hutchinson, a superheroine similar to that of Batman's sidekick Robin. Hutchinson is an expert in communications and communication technology, to the extent that she can even read information patterns by touch. She is brave and strong-willed, and cares deeply for Sheldrake.

=== Goraiko ===
Goraiko is a Japanese superhero with superhuman strength and durability apparently made out of the psychic energy of a young Japanese girl who resides in a sensory deprivation casket. Goraiko is a founding member of the Japanese equivalent of the JLA, Big Science Action.

=== Jack O'Lantern ===
Jack O'Lantern is Liam McHugh, an Irish patriot who derives some measure of mystical ability from an enchanted jack o'lantern. He is also extraordinarily agile and, although the Knight makes fun of his slim build, stronger than he looks.

=== Vixen ===
Vixen is Mari Jiwe McCabe, an African supermodel and veteran heroine who has been part of many teams, including the Justice League and the Suicide Squad. She later left the Corps and rejoined the JLA.

=== Olympian ===
Olympian is Aristides Demetrios, the national hero of Greece. He apparently wears the mythical Golden Fleece, which contains the souls and abilities of many Greek heroes, and as a result, he is able to use many of those abilities, such as the strength of Heracles. There is one drawback; the presence of so many minds within his own often confuses him, making him seem as if he has a split personality. Olympian was later described as the "disgraced 'schizophrenic Superman' of Greece", implying that this personality disorder had led to some sort of public embarrassment.

=== Kid Impala ===
Kid Impala is the teenaged successor to M'Bulaze the original South African Zulu hero known as Impala.

=== Tasmanian Devil ===
Tasmanian Devil is Hugh Dawkins, the metahuman protector of Australia and a renowned hero with the ability to transform into a humanoid Tasmanian devil akin to a werewolf. Dawkins later left the Corps and returned to the Global Guardians.

=== Little Mermaid ===
Ulla Paske of Denmark is a teenage hero born from a Danish lighthouse keeper and an Atlantean woman.

=== Fleur-de-Lis ===
A crimefighting hero from France. Her secret identity is Noelle Avril.

== Collected editions ==
Their appearances have been collected in a number of trade paperbacks, all written by Grant Morrison:

- DC One Million (with Val Semeiks, DC, 4-issue mini-series, 1998, tpb, 2004 ISBN 1-4012-0320-5)
- JLA: Justice for All (with Howard Porter & John Dell, tpb collects JLA #24–33, 1999, ISBN 1-56389-511-0)
- JLA: Ultramarine Corps (with Ed McGuiness & Dexter Vines, tpb collects JLA Classified #1–3, DC, 3-issue story arc, 2004, 144 pages, October 2007, ISBN 1-4012-1564-5)
