= Queen Bee (comics) =

Queen Bee is the name of six different characters appearing in American comic books published by DC Comics.

Queen Bee has made limited appearances in media outside comics, with Marina Sirtis voicing the character in Young Justice.

== Publication history ==
The Zazzala incarnation of Queen Bee first appeared in Justice League of America #23, and was created by Gardner Fox and Mike Sekowsky. The first Bialyan Queen Bee first appeared in Justice League International #16, and was created by J.M. DeMatteis and Keith Giffen. The Tazzala incarnation of Queen Bee first appeared in Creature Commandos #1. The Beatriz incarnation of Queen Bee first appeared in JLA: Incarnations #6, and was created by John Ostrander and Val Semeiks.

== Fictional character biographies ==
=== Queen Bee (Zazzala) ===
Queen Bee
- Queen Bee (Zazzala)

Publication information
- Publisher: DC Comics
- First appearance: Justice League of America #23 (November 1963)
- Created by: Gardner Fox; Mike Sekowsky

In-story information
- Alter ego: Zazzala
- Species: Korll humanoid
- Place of origin: Korll
- Team affiliations: Anti-Justice League; Injustice Gang; Secret Society of Super Villains; H.I.V.E. Cabal
- Abilities: Superhuman strength and speed Venomous darts Ability to release mind-confusing "pollen" powder

The leader of the hiveworld Korll, Zazzala lives only for the interstellar expansion of her species. Zazzala first appeared in Justice League of America #23 (November 1963). She clashed with the original Justice League several times during the 1960s and 1970s, but largely disappeared for several decades.

Zazzala reappeared in JLA #34 (October 1999), when Lex Luthor contacts her to join his Injustice Gang. She agrees, freeing The General from his asteroid prison in exchange for a percentage of Earth's population to become her drones. She also participates in other battles against the League. Her main effort is concentrated upon the city of New York where she forces many of the citizens to craft an 'egg matrix' out of local supplies as a way to secure even more mind-control. She attempts to brainwash Green Lantern and Steel to serve her using 'hypno-pollen', but both heroes can fight it off; Huntress encouraged Green Lantern to resist the pollen, and Steel's suit's data-protection immune systems protected him from the pollen's effects. The Queen displayed impressive physical strength, as she was able to overpower, dominate, and defeat Big Barda in direct combat. Exploiting Queen Bee's inability to see the color red, which many of the superheroes had in their costumes, Wonder Woman and Barda keep the Queen's forces occupied while Steel and Plastic Man get the drop on the Queen, Plastic Man covering Steel to render him virtually invisible to the bees. Utilizing a Boom Tube, technology controlled by Barda, they teleport the Queen and her army back to Korll.

Later, Zazzala and her drones join Luthor's new Secret Society of Super Villains. The Queen becomes the leader of the H.I.V.E., a multi-national criminal enterprise. She appears in the six-part Villains United limited series. A small team of villains, known as the Secret Six, attack her base as part of a war against the Society. Her forces are defeated, the base's prisoners Firestorm and Gehenna are freed, and Zazzala is badly wounded.

One Year Later, Zazzala appears in JLA #20, fully healed from her injuries, and attempting to steal a matter transportation device that will allow her to transport her troops to Earth. She is defeated by Wonder Woman and captured by Flash.

In 2016, DC Comics implemented a relaunch of its books called "DC Rebirth", which restored its continuity to a form much as it was prior to The New 52. Under her re-debut in Gail Simone's Plastic Man mini-series, Queen Bee appears as a member of the Cabal, a criminal organization consisting of Per Degaton, Doctor Psycho, Amazo, and Hugo Strange.

=== Queen Bee (Marcia Monroe) ===
Queen Bee

Publication information
- Publisher: DC Comics
- First appearance: The Brave and the Bold #64 (March 1966)
- Created by: Bob Haney; Win Mortimer

In-story information
- Full name: Marcia Monroe
- Species: Human
- Team affiliations: CYCLOPS

Marcia Monroe is a spoiled young woman, daughter of a wealthy man, who enjoys risking her life in absurd and pointless situations. Her playgirl attitude creates trouble for the police, who often try to save her from harm during her stunts. One day, she is rescued by Batman, who publicly spanks her. Shortly after this encounter, Marcia starts following Batman on his crime-busting activities and providing unrequested help. Batman and Marcia became an inseparable couple, but one day, she vanished without a trace.

Some time later, Batman saves a girl from being attacked with an arrow and soon realizes that she is Marcia. She had returned to Gotham City to ask Batman to return a valuable stolen gem which she had acquired from her father. Batman agrees to help her, but Marcia double-crosses Batman and provides evidence to the police incriminating Batman for the theft of the gem. It is later revealed that Marcia had joined the crime syndicate CYCLOPS under the codename of Queen Bee. She was the leader of the task force that was in charge of releasing Eclipso from his human host, Bruce Gordon.

When Eclipso threatens to murder Batman, Marcia intervenes and saves him. She then reveals that she had been forced to join CYCLOPS to save her father. Marcia helps Batman escape from Eclipso's trap and before parting ways, she gives Batman the real stolen gem and promises to stall Eclipso for a moment until he manages to escape. Batman clears his name and stops Eclipso with Bruce Gordon's help, but Marcia vanished from his life once again.

=== Queen Bee of Bialya ===
Queen Bee

Publication information
- Publisher: DC Comics
- First appearance: Justice League International #16 (August 1988)
- Created by: J.M. DeMatteis; Keith Giffen

In-story information
- Species: Human

An unrelated version of Queen Bee was introduced in Justice League International #16 (August 1988). She is an ordinary human "femme fatale", who gained control of the country of Bialya by allying with its former ruler Colonel Rumaan Harjavti, then assassinating him. She solidifies her power by brainwashing the Global Guardians into serving her. Justice League Europe found out that Queen Bee was behind their recent troubles, and that she had a Dominator named Doctor working for her. They invaded her palace and came to an agreement; she would cease hostilities against them if they kept quiet about the unethical things she was doing as Queen. They also demanded she sever relations with the Doctor. After they left, she killed the Doctor. The Queen had far-reaching influences, managing to put one of her own operatives in charge of the League via the United Nations.

Queen Bee was eventually defeated by the JLE and the Guardians, who learned of her brainwashing plot. She was assassinated by Rumaan Harjavti's brother Sumaan during the events of the JLA/JLE crossover Breakdowns (1991).

=== Queen Bee (Tazzala) ===
Queen Bee

Publication information
- Publisher: DC Comics
- First appearance: Creature Commandos #1

In-story information
- Alter ego: Tazzala; Beatriz
- Species: Korll humanoid
- Place of origin: Korll
- Abilities: Superhuman strength and speed Venomous darts Ability to release mind-confusing "pollen" powder

Queen Bee appeared in the 2000 Creature Commandos series. On the other-dimensional world of Terra Arcana, Zazzala's sister Tazzala joins Simon Magus's Terra Arcana Army with the ultimate goal of conquering Earth. The Creature Commandos stops the invasion plans, with Tazzala being killed by Magus.

=== Queen Bee of Bialya (Beatriz) ===
Queen Bee

Publication information
- Publisher: DC Comics
- First appearance: JLA: Incarnations #6 (December 2001)
- Created by: John Ostrander; Val Semeiks

In-story information
- Alter ego: Beatriz
- Species: Human

The sister of the second Queen Bee, Beatriz was introduced in JLA: Incarnations #6 (December 2001) as the new ruler of Bialya. She is using humans forged with machinery and passed off as robots Extremists to police her country. Her fate since Captain Atom's Extreme Justice team brought an end to these activities is unknown, but she was presumably toppled from power.

=== H.I.V.E. Queen ===
In "The New 52" (a 2011 reboot of the DC Comics universe), Queen Bee is revamped and renamed the H.I.V.E. Queen. She makes her debut in Superman (vol. 3) #21 as the leader of H.I.V.E. and also claims to be Brainiac's daughter. She is a member of the Twenty, a group of otherwise ordinary Metropolis citizens who are infected with a virus by Brainiac that grants them each psionic powers. However, her worldview is distorted and she becomes a zealous devotee of the alien.

== Powers and abilities ==
Queen Bee Zazzala had insect-like strength and speed. She could fire venomous stinger darts from her right wrist glands and release mind-confusing "pollen" powder.

Zazzala's sister, Tazzala, presumably had similar abilities.

The Queen Bee of Bialya had no superhuman powers or abilities, aside from her beauty and cunning. Her sister Beatriz was also an ordinary human, but was nowhere near as resourceful as her sister.

The sixth Queen Bee had psionic powers including telepathy, mind control, empathy, illusion generation, telekinesis, and energy manipulation. She also displayed some sort of healing factor, being able to reconstruct her entire body from scratch after she was blasted to pieces by the Psycho Pirate. After being infected with Brainiac's psionic virus, she temporarily gains twelfth-level intellect similar to his.

== Other characters named Queen Bee ==
=== Action Comics ===
Lissa Raven appears in Action Comics #42 (November 1941). She is the daughter of a psychologist and was temporarily made evil after his invention malfunctioned.

=== Quality Universe ===
An alternate Queen Bee appears in Blackhawk #38 (March 1951). Queen Bee was the leader of an organization called "The Golden Swarm". They poisoned prominent townspeople and swayed public opinion in their favor partly by their comely appearance. The Blackhawks defeat the Queen and her henchgirls by scaring them with mice.

=== Mystik U ===
Melissa, aka Queen Bee, is a bee-like sorceress and the founder of the Thriae Society sorority at Mystik University. She grows a large following of brainwashed thralls by giving them cocktails that transform them into worker-bee-like subjects.

== Other versions ==
An alternate universe version of Queen Bee appears in Flashpoint. This version is a member of a resistance against the Amazons before being killed in battle with them.

In the Absolute Universe, Elinore Thawne is the Queen Bee of H.I.V.E.

== In other media ==
=== Television ===
- The Zazzala incarnation of Queen Bee makes non-speaking appearances in Justice League Unlimited as a member of Gorilla Grodd's Secret Society.
- A version of Queen Bee was intended to appear in the teaser for the Batman: The Brave and the Bold episode "The Mask of Matches Malone!", but the segment was shortened due to runtime issues and rewritten to feature Poison Ivy instead. Nonetheless, a draft of the original short featuring Queen Bee was made available on writer Gail Simone's message board.
- The first Bialyan incarnation of Queen Bee appears in Young Justice, voiced by Marina Sirtis. This version possesses the power of persuasion over most men and some women and is a leading member of the Light.
- Zazzala and Tazzala appear in the My Adventures with Superman episode "All's Fair in Love and W.O.R.M.S.", with Zazzala voiced by Chandler Lovelle and Tazzala having no dialogue. These versions are the lesbian heads of the dating center W.O.R.M.S. (World Organization for Romantic Matchmaking Science).

=== Film ===
The H.I.V.E. Queen moniker is used by Rose Wilson in Deathstroke: Knights & Dragons: The Movie.

=== Video games ===
- An unidentified incarnation of Queen Bee appears as a boss in Justice League Heroes, voiced by Abby Craden.
- An unidentified incarnation of Queen Bee appears as a boss in DC Universe Online, voiced by Cyndi Williams.
- An unidentified incarnation of Queen Bee appears as a playable character in DC Unchained.
- The Zazzala incarnation of Queen Bee appears as a character summon in Scribblenauts Unmasked: A DC Comics Adventure.

=== Miscellaneous ===
- The Zazzala incarnation of Queen Bee appears in the Super Friends tie-in comics.
- The Justice League Unlimited incarnation of Zazzala / Queen Bee appears in issue #6 of Justice League Adventures and issue #29 of the Justice League Unlimited tie-in comic book.
- The Zazzala incarnation of Queen Bee appears in the DC Super Friends tie-in comics.
