= List of DC Comics characters: G =

== G.I. Robot ==
G.I. Robot is the name of a series of six robots that appeared in comic books published by DC Comics. The first four versions of G.I. Robot were all created by writer Robert Kanigher, though each was designed by a different artist. Each incarnation of G.I. Robot is an android of advanced, experimental technology designed to carry out combat and rescue missions. Multiple versions of G.I. Robot seem to develop their own free will, as well as loyalty and a sense of friendship towards human soldiers they work alongside. The first G.I. Robot, nicknamed Joe and designed by Ross Andru, first appeared in Star Spangled War Stories #101 (published in late 1961, with a cover date of February–March 1962).

=== Joe ===
During World War II, "Joe" the G.I. Robot is handed over to a Ranger unit to be tested in the field. Humanoid, with smooth features, no mouth and a control panel on its chest, Joe is assigned a human "buddy", corporal Mac. In three stories from Star Spangled War Stories #101—#103, Joe and Mac end up fighting "The War that Time Forgot" against prehistoric creatures (and a giant German robot soldier) on Dinosaur Island.

=== Mac ===
Star Spangled War Stories #125 introduced another G.I. Robot nicknamed "Mac" and his human partner Reed as part of the war-era Suicide Squad, a team specially trained for missions no ordinary soldier was expected to survive. During its first mission, Mac sacrifices itself to save Reed and another soldier from a Tyrannosaurus.

=== J.A.K.E. 1 ===
Some time after the destruction of Mac, MIT develops a new version of G.I. Robot with built-in weaponry, more advanced technology, and a more robotic appearance. Thompson's team names this new G.I. Robot "J.A.K.E. #1" (Jungle Automatic Killer - Experimental). For its first mission, J.A.K.E. 1 is deployed to a Pacific island alongside the Marines to fight the Japanese military and placed under the control of Sergeant Coker. Coker initially does not trust J.A.K.E., but comes to respect him. J.A.K.E. later joins the Creature Commandos and sacrifices himself to save them.

=== J.A.K.E. 2 ===
Weeks after the destruction of J.A.K.E. 1, his successor J.A.K.E. 2 is sent to the Pacific islands to join the marines there. On activation, J.A.K.E. 2 seems unresponsive at first but then acts to defend the marine camp from a samurai robot built by the Japanese military. After defeating the robot, J.A.K.E. 2 engages in several missions in the Pacific Theater, as well as on Dinosaur Island. Eventually, he also meets the Creature Commandos and is accepted into their ranks. Later on, J.A.K.E. 2 and the Creature Commandos are aboard a rocket that misfires and heads into deep space. The Creature Commandos are known to have survived, but J.A.K.E. 2's fate is unknown. The DC Comics Encyclopedia describes J.A.K.E. 2 as having survived into the 31st century.

=== J.A.K.E. #6.1 ===
In Checkmate (vol. 2) #24, a new G.I. Robot is revealed, with the designation J.A.K.E. #6.1. It is one of the organization's Rooks, a team of four elite operatives of last resort. Apparently constructed using the original World War II era programming, it has a new body made of components formerly used by Maxwell Lord during a time when his consciousness was contained in an android form.

=== Lord Job ===
A new G.I. Robot of unknown origin appears in the 2008-2009 The War That Time Forgot miniseries written by Bruce Jones, where it is known as "Lord Job", but calls himself "Joe". This version can speak and has red eyes, but is otherwise of a similar appearance to the earlier models, particularly Joe.

=== Powers and abilities ===
The G.I. Robots are all fully autonomous mechanical soldiers, capable of making decisions and adapting to changes in their environment. J.A.K.E. 1, J.A.K.E. 2, and J.A.K.E. #6.1 are equipped with a minigun in their left arm, with J.A.K.E. #6.1 also possessing a grenade launcher mounted on its right shoulder and caltrops deployed from its chest cavity.

=== G.I. Robot in other media ===
- G.I. Robot appears in the teaser for the Batman: The Brave and the Bold episode "The Plague of the Prototypes!", voiced by an uncredited James Arnold Taylor. He works with Batman and Sgt. Rock to stop Nazi soldiers before sacrificing himself to save Sgt. Rock from a landmine.
- G.I. Robot appears in Creature Commandos, voiced by Sean Gunn. This version previously served with the Easy Company during WWII until he was eventually arrested and incarcerated in Belle Reve Penitentiary after killing a Neo-Nazi group in the 2000s. In the present, G.I. Robot is recruited into the eponymous team.
- G.I. Robot appears as a character summon in Scribblenauts Unmasked: A DC Comics Adventure.
- G.I. Robot appears in issue #6 of Batman: The Brave and the Bold.

== Galactic Golem ==
- First appearance: Superman #248 (February 1972)
- Created by: Len Wein and Curt Swan
- Further reading: Galactic Golem at the Comic Book DB (archived from the original); Golem&type=character Galactic Golem at the Grand Comics Database

The Galactic Golem is a solar-powered creature created by Lex Luthor who is an enemy of Superman. Creator Len Wein said that he created the Golem "because I needed somebody Superman could hit! The problem with Superman's rogues' gallery was, they were all thinkers...they were scientists, or guys who built toys. With the Golem, he could hit Superman, and Superman could hit him back". It only made two appearances: Superman #248 (February 1972) and 258 (November 1972), before being erased from continuity following Crisis on Infinite Earths.

The Galactic Golem is reintroduced in Superman #675 (2008), where it is depicted as a Daxamite superweapon.

== Paul Gambi ==
Paul Gambi is a tailor in Central City and associate of the Rogues. He later created the "ultimate super-costume", which was first worn by serial killer Dell Merriwether until he was defeated by Flash and Green Lantern and sentenced to the electric chair. However, the suit unexpectedly gained sentience and became indestructible.

In the "DC Rebirth" reboot, Flash unsuccessfully invades Gambi's business to find the Rogues.

=== Paul Gambi in other media ===
Paul Gambi appears in Batman: The Brave and the Bold #15.

== Gamesman ==
Gamesman is a mercenary. He kidnapped Animal Man's daughter Maxine Baker and imprisoned her in the Red. At the time when Aquaman was blinded by Poseidon for besting Triton, Animal Man sought out Aquaman for help. Animal Man draws upon the strength of the sperm whale Namek to damage Gamesman's armor causing him to flee Both of them managed to free Maxine as Animal Man taps into the fight abilities of a gull to pursue Gamesman while Aquaman keeps Maxine safe.

During the "Infinite Crisis" storyline, Gamesman appears as a member of Alexander Luthor Jr.'s Secret Society of Super Villains.

== Gangbuster ==
Gangbuster is the name of two characters in DC Comics.

=== Jose Delgado ===
Jose Delgado grew up in the Metropolis area known as Suicide Slum. As he grew older he became a skilled boxer. He went into teaching and ended up as a high school teacher in Metropolis. He became a mentor to Jerry White (the son of Perry White). When Lex Luthor enlisted youth gangs into organized crime under his control, Jose adopted the identity of Gangbuster to deal with the threat posed to the teenagers in his community.

Jose Delgado suffered a spinal injury while saving Lois Lane's life during a fight with a creature called Combattor. Delgado was hospitalized and talked into retiring by Cat Grant. He recovered the ability to walk with the assistance of a LexCorp cybernetic implant. After recovering, Delgado discovered that the implant which enabled him to walk was a LexCorp invention, and that Lex Luthor could use it to take control of his body. Luthor forced Gangbuster to attack Professor Emil Hamilton, an ally of Superman. Hamilton was later able to successfully alter the implant, allowing Gangbuster to regain control.

Ordway spoke on the character's creation, “I had wanted to introduce elements from Jack Kirby’s 1970s run on JIMMY OLSEN – characters like the Guardian, and the DNAliens. When that was vetoed by editorial, I changed the Guardian into Gangbuster, and with my studiomate, Mike Machlan, wrote up a character arc which was then incorporated into our book.”

=== Rebekah Delgado ===
During DC Rebirth, Jose's niece is introduced named Rebekah and assumes the role of Gangbuster.

== Allegra Garcia ==
- First appearance: Titans (vol. 2) #28 (December 2010)
- Created by: Eric Wallace, Fabrizio Florentino and Cliff Richards

Allegra Garcia is the daughter of supervillain Eduardo Reyes / Wavelength who inherited similar light manipulation powers.

Allegra Garcia was raised in the Santa Marta slums of Rio de Janeiro by her foster parents Ramon Garcia and Esperanza Garcia. Upon emigrating to Gotham City while developing the ability to emit electromagnetic light, she fell in with some gangs and took parts in robberies before being stopped by the local vigilantes and remanded to Arkham Asylum. To reunite with his daughter after some villains he knew saw Allegra, Wavelength hired Deathstroke and his version of the Titans to spring her out of Arkham Asylum, fighting through Batman and some of Arkham Asylum's inmates when they tried to escape. When the mission was a success, Deathstroke's Titans brought her to Brazil, where Allegra lashed out against her father for abandoning her and used the UV rays in the sky to fry him. Deathstroke declined Allegra's offer to join up with him, stating that she has a lot of growing up to do.

=== Allegra Garcia in other media ===
Allegra Garcia appears in The Flash, portrayed by Kayla Compton.

- The Earth-1 version, also known as Wavelength, is a young metahuman with abilities based on the electromagnetic spectrum who wants to be a reporter. Despite coming from a criminal background and having been previously incarcerated in Iron Heights Penitentiary, Cecile Horton helps her turn her life around. After an attack by her metahuman cousin Ultraviolet and being framed for crimes, Allegra is saved by Barry Allen. Afterwards, she interns at Iris West-Allen's Central City Citizen newspaper. Allegra later investigates Black Hole, helps Team Flash stop various supervillains, reforms her cousin, and enters a relationship with Chester P. Runk.
- Allegra's Earth-719 doppelgänger is called Maya, a protégé of Nash Wells.

== Esperanza Garcia ==
Esperanza Garcia is Allegra Garcia's adoptive mother.

=== Esperanza Garcia in other media ===
Esperanza Garcia appears in The Flash, portrayed by Alexa Barajas and voiced by Erika Soto in the seventh season. This version is Allegra Garcia's cousin who possesses similar electromagnetic spectrum-based abilities. Esperanza is presumed dead following the explosion of S.T.A.R. Labs' particle accelerator, but is secretly taken in, revived, and trained to become the assassin Ultraviolet by Black Hole. Amidst this, Black Hole scientist Dr. Olsen removed her vocal cords and gave her a mask to help her speak. After making sporadic appearances in the sixth season, Esperanza seeks revenge on Olsen in the seventh season, but is foiled by Allegra and receives medical help from Caitlin Snow before being killed while hunting Black Hole's remnants.

== Garguax ==
Garguax is a character appearing in American comic books published by DC Comics. He is a mammoth-sized alien conqueror who was exiled from his home planet for his plans to conquer the universe. Garguax later appears as a member of the Brotherhood of Evil alongside General Immortus when they unleash the Giant Jukebox Robot. Garguax pitches an idea to the Brotherhood of Evil to take over Earth. Immortus supported his idea as he uses a device to turn anyone into diamond-skinned slaves that obey the Brotherhood of Evil's every command.

The claims that Garguax made about being exiled from his homeworld were false as he turns out to be an agent of his homeworld's ruler Zarox-13. Garguax betrays the Brotherhood of Evil after Zarox-13 arrives on Earth to conquer it. The Doom Patrol and the Brotherhood of Evil are forced to work together to defeat Zarox-13.

In the "Dawn of DC" relaunch, Garguax is depicted as the emperor of the Moon.

=== Garguax in other media ===
- Garguax appears as a character summon in Scribblenauts Unmasked: A DC Comics Adventure.
- Garguax appears in the Doom Patrol episode "Vacay Patrol", portrayed by Stephen Murphy. This version is a member of the Brotherhood of Evil and is served by a red alien named Samuelson, who later betrays and kills him.

== Garn Daanuth ==
- First appearance: Warlord #62 (July 1982)
- Created by: Paul Kupperberg; Jan Duursema
- Species: Deity (demigod, cosmic being)
- Teams: Lords of Chaos, Atlantean Pantheon
- Abilities: In his prime, possess virtually unlimited magical energies and control of both black magic and chaos magic, allowing for many powers (mind control, flight, astral projection, etc.). Also in physical peak condition, a capable swordsman, and skilled in sciences such as cybernetics, technology, and politics.
- Aliases: Mad Mage of Mu, Hassagarn

Garn Daanuth is a supervillain appearing in American comic books published by DC Comics, making his first debut in The Warlord #62 (July 1982). A Lord of Chaos and Arion's fraternal twin (inherited his mother's darker Egyptian-esque features) who formerly ruled over Mu, a city-state to Atlantis whose people resemble ancient Egyptians, he is both his brother's archnemesis and the alleged ancestor to the hero Garth (Aqualad/Tempest).

The eldest twin of Arion and son of Majistra and Calculha, Garn is raised by Majistra in Mu. Majistra teaches Garn black magic in accordance of a prophecy regarding two brothers in eternal conflict over the fate of Atlantis as an agent of the Lords of Chaos. Garn becomes a rival of Arion after he drains power from the Zodiac Crystals, bleaching his skin and seemingly killing Majistra. With the pair battling over the course of a thousand years, in which they learn much later of their shared parentage, Daanuth frequently plots his conquest of Atlantis, leading to the eventual death of its monarch, D'Tilluh, due to his mind control plots fracturing his mental state towards suicide, the ostracizing of his royal family through his overt mental manipulations of D'Tilluh's son and heir, and becoming an ally of Vandal Savage at one point to help him undermine the ancient Atlantean government. Daanuth survived to modern times, albeit depowered, depicted as the despot ruler of the Kuran, a fictional small country in the Middle East. Regaining his former magical powers, he bolsters his army and is stopped by Arion before he can launch his military campaign to expand his territory. He is also recruited by the Darkworld entity to become his guardian against Arion, whom defeats Garn and mystically merges him and the Darkworld entity in a state between sleep and awakeness, freezing the natural magic from the entity and allowing Arion and his allies to remain mystically powered.

=== Garn Daanuth in other media ===
- Garn Daanuth appears as a character summon in Scribblenauts Unmasked: A DC Comics Adventure.
- An original character based on Garn Daanuth appears in Young Justice, voiced by Robbie Daymond. Named Danuuth, he is the descendant of his namesake (despite the altered naming) and a former royal Atlantean guard revealed as a xenophobic purist and served as Ocean Master's right-hand man.

== Danni Garrett ==
Danielle "Danni" Garrett is the granddaughter of Dan Garrett. The character, created by Keith Giffen, John Rogers and Cully Hamner, first appeared in Blue Beetle vol. 7 #8 (December 2006).

== Joan Garrick ==
Joan Garrick is a supporting character and romantic interest of Jay Garrick / The Flash.

The character was created by Gardner Fox and Harry Lampert, and first appeared in Flash Comics #1 (January 1940). She appeared in the cover alongside the Flash on the issue. She would remain the supporting character of the titular character throughout the Golden Age, and she was revived through the Silver Age in "Flash of Two Worlds", where she is revealed to be a part of Earth-Two.

Joan Williams was depicted as the college crush of Jay who Joan originally rejected. Later, Jay used speedster powers as a football star to impress Joan and later decided to be a superhero known as the Flash. The Flash helped Joan when the former's father was kidnapped. She would remain a girlfriend and confidante to the Flash. Unlike Lois Lane and Superman, Joan was always aware of the Flash's secret identity. The events of Crisis on Infinite Earths reconnected both Jay and Joan and the entire Keystone City citizens as being in a coma until Barry Allen revived the two. The couple ultimately married, and Jay retired from the Justice Society of America for a while until later returning to the group.

In "The New Golden Age", it is revealed that Joan and Jay had a child named Judy Garrick (also known as Boom) before she mysteriously vanished. In reality, the Time Masters had kidnapped her in an attempt to save her from being killed by Doctor Manhattan's alterations to the timeline, and she is recovered and transported to the present day.

=== Reception of Joan Garrick ===
Joan was described as an essential part of the Golden Age Flash's life in later decades by Mark Ginnochio of Comicbook.com. Joan and Jay's marriage is cited as being "among the most popular of DC's earliest married characters" by Vaneta Rogers of Newsarama. Jim Beard in the book The Flash Companion wrote positively of the character's depiction by Sheldon Mayer which he felt was an example of "strong females" at the time. John Wells, in the same book, compared Gardner Fox's deriving of the character to other works of characters like Dian Belmont of Sandman, Inza Cramer of Doctor Fate and Shiera Hall of Hawkman that the female romantic interests were not just lovers but also confidantes of their respective superheroes as depicted at the time.

=== Joan Garrick in other media ===
- Joan Garrick appears in Young Justice, voiced by Kath Soucie. This version, alongside Jay Garrick, served as Bart Allen's legal guardian following his arrival in the past, before she died off-screen from an unspecified illness.
- Joan Williams appears in The Flash, portrayed by Michelle Harrison. This version is the Earth-3 counterpart of Nora Allen.

== Garv ==
Garv is an alien Dryad, a rock-like being, who joined Vril Dox and his teams, the L.E.G.I.O.N. and the R.E.B.E.L.S., and marrying fellow team member Strata.

== Gehenna ==
- First appearance: Villains United #5 (November 2005)
- Created by: Stuart Moore and Jamal Igle
- Abilities: Teleportation; limited telepathy
- Aliases: Gehenna Hewitt
- Further reading: Gehenna at the Comic Book DB (archived from the original); Gehenna at the Grand Comics Database

Gehenna is a superhero in the DC Universe. She is a clone of Victor Hewitt who is rescued by Firestorm (Jason Rusch). Her telepathic ability is shown to be limited to those participating in the Firestorm matrix and strongest with Jason. Jason finds and rescues Gehenna while escaping from a hideout of the Society during the events of Villains United.

Gehenna, still adapting to normal life, spends time in Jason's apartment, and the two begin dating. She is jealous of Firehawk, who is bonded with Jason as part of the Firestorm matrix.

At the beginning of the Blackest Night storyline, Jason and Gehenna visit the grave of Ronnie Raymond with Martin Stein. Later, at the Hall of Justice, Jason and Gehenna observe Black Lantern attacks happening all over the world. They are joined soon after by Green Lantern and the Flash, and the group are ambushed by Black Lanterns. Ronnie Raymond, who has been resurrected as a Black Lantern, kills Gehenna by transforming her body into salt.

== Geist ==
Geist (Dwayne Geyer) is a fictional character in the DC Comics universe. First appearing in Detective Comics Annual #6 (1993), Geyer was later bitten by an alien parasite during the events of Bloodlines and gained the ability to become invisible. He becomes less visible in dim lighting and completely invisible in bright light.

During the Infinite Crisis event, Geist and the Blood Pack are killed by Superboy-Prime. Geist later appears as a resident of Limbo, a dimension inhabited by forgotten characters where no stories happen. Geist is rescued by Superman and a dimension-crossing ship and helps battle the cosmic threat of Mandrakk.

In the storyline Blackest Night, Geist is reanimated as a member of the Black Lantern Corps. Superboy-Prime destroys Geist using a black power ring, which generates a burst of colored energy that destroys Black Lanterns.

== Gemini ==
Gemini is the name of two characters in DC Comics.

=== Gemini De Mille ===
Gemini De Mille is the daughter of Madame Rouge. In the Beast Boy (January 2000) mini-series, she seeks revenge against Beast Boy for killing her mother, her insanity having twisted her mother's death as the deliberate fault of Niles Caulder and Beast Boy when it was merely an accident. She attempted to frame Beast Boy for the murders of his former cast members in an old TV show. After being tracked down by Beast Boy, Gemini reveals that she had kidnapped his co-stars Vicky Valiant and Tim Bender and intends to kill them. She is thwarted by Beast Boy, Flamebird, and Nightwing.

Gemini later joins her mother's old group, the Brotherhood of Evil. Her first mission with them was an arms deal with Penguin in Blüdhaven, but they were defeated by Batgirl.

During the "Infinite Crisis" storyline, Gemini joins the Secret Society of Super Villains.

In the series Unstoppable Doom Patrol, Gemini returns to the Brotherhood of Evil.

=== Santiago and Belladonna ===
Santiago and Belladonna are a pair of thieves and lovers who originate from the 1940s and are obsessed with gaining mystical relics. One relic they found were mystical gauntlets that enabled them to absorb energy and keep themselves young. They operate as Gemini and target the Flash in a bid to gain his superhuman speed. These plans last until Santiago is killed by Psych during their fight with him and Flash.

== Geomancer ==
- First appearance: JSA #5 (December 1999)
- Created by: Geoff Johns, David S. Goyer, Derec Aucoin
- Abilities: Geokinesis
- Aliases: Adam Fells

The Geomancer is the name of two supervillains in DC Comics.

=== Adam Fells ===
Adam Fells was a hired gun with earth-manipulating abilities, a member of the Injustice Society, and an enemy of the Justice Society of America. The Geomancer later appears as a member of the Injustice Society where they attacked the Justice Society of America's headquarters. Despite being outnumbered, Wildcat manages to defeat them as Johnny Sorrow escapes after getting what he came for.

Ultra-Humanite is revealed to have the Geomancer in suspended animation. Icicle tries to free Geomancer from suspended animation, only to accidentally kill him.

=== Second version ===
An unnamed man with similar powers became the second Geomancer and a member of the Injustice Society.

=== Geomancer in other media ===
- The Adam Fells incarnation of Geomancer appears as a character summon in Scribblenauts Unmasked: A DC Comics Adventure.
- The Adam Fells incarnation of Geomancer appears in The Flash, portrayed by Adam Stafford.

== Ghost-Maker ==
Ghost-Maker (Minhkhoa Khan) is a character first appearing in Batman vol. 3 #100 (Dec. 2020). He was created by James Tynion IV and Jorge Jiménez.

Khan is a Singaporean vigilante who was trained alongside Batman early in his career but split apart, taking on the "Ghost-Maker" mantle utilizing a high-tech suit and several vehicles. After the Joker War, Ghost-Maker becomes the leader of Batman Incorporated and Clownhunter's mentor.

== Asa Gilmore ==
Dr. Asa Gilmore is a character appearing in DC Comics. The character first appeared in The Flash (vol. 2) #144 (January 1999), and was created by Mark Waid and Brian Augustyn. He is behind the origin story of Malcolm Thawne / Cobalt Blue. Gilmore killed the con artist Thawne family's child, covering his negligence with Malcolm who he lied about as a stillborn to the Allen family. Ultimately, Gilmore told the truth to Malcolm who murdered the doctor in a rage.

=== Asa Gilmore in other media ===
A character based on Asa Gilmore named Malcolm Gilmore appears in the ninth season of The Flash (2014). This version is an alias utilized by Eddie Thawne as Mercury Labs' scientist in the year 2049.

== Summer Gleeson ==
Summer Gleeson is a news reporter from Gotham City. She was originally created by Paul Dini and Bruce Timm for the Batman: The Animated Series in 1992, where she was voiced by Mari Devon.

Gleeson was later introduced to the comics in Batman: Gotham Knights #33 (2002).

=== Summer Gleeson in other media ===
Summer Gleeson appears in flashbacks depicted in The Penguin episode "Cent'Anni", portrayed by Nadine Malouf. This version was said to have been killed by the Hangman while investigating the Falcone crime family.

== Golden Eagle ==
Golden Eagle is the name of two characters appearing in media published by DC Comics.

=== Charley Parker ===
==== Pre-Crisis ====
The original Golden Eagle was Charley Parker, an orphan who lived in the Midway City orphanage and idolized Hawkman. At one point he sent a letter to Hawkman describing his home-made "Hawkman" costume. In Justice League of America #109, Hawkman was ordered to return to Thanagar, thus resigning from the JLA. Golden Eagle debuted seven issues later in Justice League of America #116.

Parker explained that one day he had been wearing his "Hawkman" costume and fantasizing he was him when a strange light enveloped him, turning his costume into an exact replica of Hawkman's costume. He also gained the ability to fly due to the replicated wings of his costume. Charley could at will change his street clothes into the Golden Eagle costume. The Justice League is called by the Midway City Police due to several incidents where criminals were dropped off at the police headquarters, captured by someone unknown who left a golden feather behind—Hawkman's old modus operandi. The Leaguers investigate and are attacked by Hawkman's old foe Matter Master, a man who carried a mentally controlled wand that could manipulate matter. The Matter Master thought that the Golden Eagle was Hawkman and brought him to his hidden lair. At the end of the story, Charley was changed back into a normal teenager.

He later appeared in Teen Titans #50–52 as a member of Titans West.

==== Ch'al Andar ====
In Hawkman (vol. 4), Charley Parker is reimagined as a courier for the criminal Mick Valdare who was fired after turning eighteen. Desolate, alone, and without the luxuries he had grown accustomed to, Parker considered suicide before being rescued by and becoming a pupil of Hawkman. After Hall is seemingly killed in battle, Parker becomes the new Hawkman and is revealed to be Ch'al Andar, the son of the Thanagarian Fel Andar and the human Sharon Parker. However, he attacks Kendra Saunders, is revealed to have orchestrated Hall's death, and is sent to Thanagar to be judged. Parker is later pardoned, becomes the leader of a group of Wingmen, and gains a cybernetic eyepatch after Hall partially blinds him. He reunites with his father, who encourages him to reform.

=== Aryan Brigade version ===
The second, unnamed Golden Eagle is a white supremacist and member of the Aryan Brigade who is equipped with mechanical wings.

=== Golden Eagle in other media ===
- The Charley Parker incarnation of Golden Eagle appears in Teen Titans Go! #50 as a potential new member of the titular group.
- Golden Eagle appears as a character summon in Scribblenauts Unmasked: A DC Comics Adventure.

== Goldface ==
Goldface is an enemy of Green Lantern and the Flash. He was created by Gardner Fox and Gil Kane, and first appeared in Green Lantern (vol. 2) #38 (1965).

Keith Kenyon was a political sciences student who was exposed to a chest of gold that had been affected by toxic waste. As a result of exposure, he gained superhuman strength and invulnerability. Deciding to rebel against the wishes of his father, a prominent labor union organizer, he began stealing gold around Coast City, which led to his defeat by Green Lantern. He began to refine his criminal ways by wearing gold-plated armor and using a gun that sprayed liquid gold. After many clashes with Green Lantern, Kenyon decided to change his motif and ruthlessly began taking over criminal empires. He eventually moved to Central City and became a foe of the second Flash (Barry Allen). Later on, Goldface reformed, marrying Amunet Black / Blacksmith, moving to Keystone City, and becoming the commissioner of Union 242. Over time, his elixir transformed his skin into organic gold.

=== Goldface in other media ===
- Goldface appears in Justice League Unlimited, voiced by an uncredited Lex Lang. This version is a member of Gorilla Grodd's Secret Society.
- Goldface appears in The Flash, portrayed by Damion Poitier. This version is a metahuman crime boss in the black market weapons business and ex-boyfriend of Amunet Black who can transform into and manipulate gold.
- An original incarnation of Goldface named Tajz appears in Green Lantern: The Animated Series #7. This version is an alien from the planet Volkreg and a former friend of Razer whom the Red Lantern Corps rescued from a war and empowered with yellow crystals.
- Goldface appears as a character summon in Scribblenauts Unmasked: A DC Comics Adventure.

== Goldilocks ==
Goldilocks is a fictional character appearing in American comic books published by DC Comics.

During One Year Later, Goldilocks is recruited by the villains Brain and Monsieur Mallah to join the latest incarnation of the Brotherhood of Evil. She is recruited at the same time as Elephant Man. With a fairy-tale personality, she wants Robin to be her "Prince Charming" and has a twisted idea of what constitutes a "Happy Ending".

== Gold Lantern ==
Gold Lantern (occasionally Golden Lantern) is the name of several superheroes appearing in American comic books published by DC Comics. Created by writer Grant Morrison and artist Liam Sharp, the original Gold Lantern first appeared in The Green Lantern #10 (released August 7, 2019; cover-dated October 2019). The second version was created by Brian Michael Bendis and appears in Superman (vol. 5) #14 (released August 28, 2019; cover-dated October 2019).

=== Zundernell ===
Sir Zundernell is the Golden Lantern of Earth-15. He was the gigantic custodian of an artifact named the Cosmic Grail, hidden in his destroyed Earth. Bored of his job, he sent out a distress signal to multiple Green Lanterns across the multiverse. Offended by how short they all were, he trapped them in his universe to use as warriors for an upcoming threat.

=== Kala Lour ===
The second Gold Lantern is Kala Lour, a blind Filipino man and a former schoolteacher. The Elders of Oa offered him as their ambassador for a membership in the Legion of Super-Heroes with a Gold Lantern Ring, after which Kala took on the Gold Lantern mantle for good.

=== Gold Lantern in other media ===
The Kala Lour incarnation of Gold Lantern makes a non-speaking cameo appearance in Legion of Super-Heroes.

== James Gordon Jr. ==
James Gordon Jr. is a character appearing in American comic books published by DC Comics. The character, created by Frank Miller and Dave Mazzucchelli, first appeared in Batman #407 (May 1987). He is the son of James "Jim" Gordon Sr. and Barbara Kean, and the brother of Barbara Gordon.

James moved to Chicago with his mother who divorced the elder Gordon. After his introduction in Batman: Year One, the character appeared almost exclusively in comics set during the Year One era, and went virtually unmentioned in present day. Scott Snyder's story Batman: The Black Mirror reintroduced James as an adult, and establishes that he is a sociopath who tortures and kills for pleasure. He is institutionalized as a teenager after he disfigures a school bus driver who insulted him. After he is released years later, he commits a series of brutal murders, while trying to frame the Joker for his crimes. After nearly killing his mother and capturing his sister, James is apprehended by his father and Batman (Dick Grayson), and institutionalized in Arkham Asylum.

In The New 52, James appears in the Batgirl series. He escapes from Arkham, and begins stalking his sister who he views as a rival for his father's affection. The series reveals that he deliberately caused their parents' divorce: he killed a cat his mother had bought for Barbara and then threatened to kill his sister if she did not leave the family and threatened to kill Barbara if she tried to contact them ever again.

=== James Gordon Jr. in other media ===
James Gordon Jr. appears in The Dark Knight trilogy, portrayed by Hayden Nickel in Batman Begins and Nathan Gamble in The Dark Knight.

== Gorgon ==
Gorgon is the name of several characters in DC Comics.

=== Andonis Bal ===
Andonis Bal is an archaeologist. He and his wife Angelika were excavating the Temple of Medusa where a ruby they removed set off a trap. This caused a beam to be fired from the Medusa statue which injured the Bals. Mento saved their lives and transformed Angelika into Harpi and Andonis into Gorgon; in these forms, they resemble their namesakes, the Gorgon and Harpy. Gorgon can also see through the snakes that make up his hair and can temporarily turn anyone to stone with his gaze. Gorgon and Harpi go on to join Hybrid.

=== Angor Gorgon ===
The first Gorgon is a supervillain from Angor, a duplicate of Earth in another dimension. Gorgon was killed when Angor was destroyed, leaving Dreamslayer to use a robotic duplicate.

=== Earth-8 Gorgon ===
In Lord Havok and the Extremists series (2007), a new version of Gorgon is featured, a denizen of Earth-8. This version is a scientist who was working on genetic alteration to give a person the ability to deal with threats by changing into a monster form. After being caught in an explosion at his lab, Mortimer is transformed into a Gorgon-like creature whose head tentacles each possess a different personality. After one of the tentacles kills his girlfriend, a distraught Mortimer is recruited by Lord Havok.

== Gorilla Boss ==
Gorilla Boss is a character appearing in American comic books published by DC Comics.

George Dyke is a crime boss who was executed in a gas chamber, with his brain being transplanted into the body of a gorilla. Due to no longer being able to speak, he uses a pad and pencil to order Doc Willard and his henchmen to procure the required funds so that he can have his brain placed in the body of Batman and Batman's brain placed in the body of the gorilla. Gorilla Boss committed a series of crimes and claims that once Batman's brain is in the body of the gorilla, the police will mistake him for the culprit and kill him. Batman escapes Gorilla Boss's grasp and is chased up the building until Gorilla Boss falls to the street; he remains unconscious by the time Batman makes it to the ground.

Aliens transplant the brain of Gorilla Boss into the body of a chlorophyll-sapping alien beast as part of their plans to take over Earth. Superman and Batman thwart the alien invasion, but Gorilla Boss escapes with Doc Willard. A witness to Whisperer's crime spree was later subjected to a brain surgery by Doc Willard to place Gorilla Boss' brain in him. Batman later finds Willard in a mentally-deranged state. When interrogating him at the Batcave, he revealed that a "yellow alien" took Gorilla Boss' brain. Batman deduces that Sinestro was responsible. Superman finds that Sinestro is using Gorilla Boss' brain to increase his power supply. Doc Willard is remanded to Arkham Asylum while Gorilla Boss' brain is placed back in its place in the Batcave.

=== Gorilla Boss in other media ===
- Gorilla Boss appears in the Batman: The Brave and the Bold episode "Gorillas in Our Midst!", voiced by Diedrich Bader. This version is a member of G.A.S.P. (Gorillas and Apes Seizing Power) who sports a white hair streak and is capable of speech.
- Gorilla Boss appears as a character summon in Scribblenauts Unmasked: A DC Comics Adventure.

== Goth ==
Goth is a demon who once posed as a rock star named Limbo. He once targeted an anti-aging formula for Contessa. Goth later passed himself off as a horror movie actor, whose activities attracted the attention of Nightwing. When Goth started to lure children to Dis, the Teen Titans sprung into action and saved the children while Goth escaped.

Goth also created a group of Wildebeests, who resemble hybrids of humans and their namesakes.

During the "Infinite Crisis" storyline, Goth appears as a member of Alexander Luthor Jr.'s Secret Society of Super Villains.

== Gotham and Gotham Girl ==
Gotham (Henry Clover Jr.) and Gotham Girl (Claire Clover) were characters created by DC Comics, debuting in DC Rebirth. They were created by Tom King and David Finch.

The Clovers are twins with Superman-like powers which they bought with their family's money, trading in their lives for them as the powers would affect their lifespan. The two assisted Batman against Solomon Grundy and the Kobra Cult. Henry Jr. was killed by the Psycho Pirate while an unstable Claire later joined the Flashpoint Batman (Thomas Wayne).

== Marion Grange ==
Marion Grange is a politician who became the mayor of Gotham City after defeating Armand Krol in the election, with Krol later dying from the Clench virus, a version of ebola created by the Order of St. Dumas. Grange received backing in her election from Bruce Wayne.

During the Batman: No Man's Land storyline, Grange is killed by a sniper while trying to secure funding for Gotham in Washington, D.C. following an earthquake.

=== Marion Grange in other media ===
- A genderbent version of Marion Grange appears in The Batman, voiced by Adam West. This version is an old friend of Thomas Wayne. By season five, Grange is succeeded as mayor by Hamilton Hill.
- Marion Grange appears in Beware the Batman, voiced by C.C.H. Pounder. This version is African-American.

== Milos Grapa ==
Milos Grapa is a character appearing in American comic books published by DC Comics. He was Carmine Falcone's loyal bodyguard, who fell victim of the Holiday Killer in Christmas.

=== Milos Grapa in other media ===
- Milos Grapa appears in The Penguin episode "Cent'Anni", portrayed by James Madio. This version was Carmine Falcone's former bodyguard who eventually became the Falcone family's consigliere before he is killed by Sofia Falcone.
- Milos Grapa makes a non-speaking appearance in Batman: The Long Halloween.

== Gravedigger ==
Gravedigger is the name of two characters appearing in American comic books published by DC Comics.

=== Ulysses Hazard ===
Ulysses Hazard is a soldier who operated during World War II. His grandson Percy Hazard operated as Hazard of Squad K.

=== Tyson Sykes ===
Tyson Sykes is a Checkmate agent and one of their Rooks who was later injected with a formula containing Starro DNA.

=== Gravedigger in other media ===
- The Ulysses Hazard incarnation of Gravedigger appears as a character summon in Scribblenauts Unmasked: A DC Comics Adventure.
- The Tyson Sykes incarnation of Gravedigger appears in the third season of Black Lightning, portrayed by Wayne Brady. This version fought in World War II, gained his powers through a government experiment, was given a formula created by Helga Jace that maintained his youth, and is Black Lightning's great-uncle. After becoming disillusioned by racism during WWII, Sykes defected to Markovia following the war to help them establish a metahuman nation. In the present, he takes part in Markovia's invasion of Freeland, fighting Black Lightning several times until Sykes is presumed dead in the explosion of an A.S.A. facility called the Pit. Having survived, a disguised Sykes observes a congressional hearing where Black Lightning exposes the A.S.A. and Markovia's metahuman experiments before leaving, satisfied by the outcome.

== Great Caesar ==
Great Caesar is the name of several characters in DC Comics. All of them are humanoid tigers.

=== Earth-AD version ===
On Earth-AD, Great Caesar is the ruler of the Tiger People and the father of Prince Tuftan. Both he and Tuftan have had encounters with Kamandi.

=== New Earth version ===
In post-Crisis continuity, Great Caesar is an evolved tiger created by Project Moreau, a precursor to Project Cadmus, in the 1940s. He and Project Moreau's other creations live on an uncharted island called the Wild Lands, where he is a rival of Nosferata. After Nosferata and her underling Ratsputin kill Caesar, Tuftan succeeds him as ruler. Nosferata plans to manipulate Tuftan, who reluctantly accepts her as his bride.

=== Prime Earth version ===
In 2011, "The New 52" rebooted the DC universe. Great Caesar and Tuftan are reimagined as tigers who were transformed into anthropomorphic forms by the Factory of Evil under warden Simyan. Caesar is brainwashed and forced to attack Tuftan, who kills him.

=== Great Caesar in other media ===
Great Caesar appears in the Batman: The Brave and the Bold episode "Last Bat on Earth!", voiced by Peter Woodward.

== Great White Shark ==
Warren White was a corrupt investor who tried to avoid prison by scoring a false insanity plea in court. However, White was sent to Arkham Asylum alongside the most dangerous members of Batman's rogues gallery. There, he was submitted to torture, abuse and disfigurement, ending up actually insane, and deformed without hair, ears or nose, and pale white skin. White then becomes known as the Great White Shark, usually a benefactor to other villains.

== Grid ==
Grid is a character appearing in American comic books published by DC Comics.

Silas Stone uses technology to convert his son Victor Stone into Cyborg so Victor gains secondary cybernetic systems that passively search for information and refers to the software as "Grid". As it grows with every computer intelligence, it developed traits of the hackers and viruses that it encountered. Grid's full sentience is brought out by Atomica who uses it to steal the date of the Justice League's adventures during the "Trinity War" storyline. Grid joins the Crime Syndicate of America and gains a physical body made from Cyborg's technology.

During the "Forever Evil" storyline, Grid serves in the Crime Syndicate's plan to take over the world. He starts by cutting power to all major cities and releasing prisoners from several superhuman prisons. After reactivating the Metal Men, Cyborg informs them of Grid as they head to Happy Harbor to take on the Crime Syndicate. Cyborg lures Grid out and the Metal Men begin attacking him. Grid brings Society members to help as Grid enters Cyborg's body. Cyborg traps Grid in his body as the Metal Men defeat the Secret Society of Super Villains members that are present.

During the 2016 "Darkseid War" storyline, Grid is still in Cyborg's body when the surviving Crime Syndicate members and the Justice League in a plot to end the conflict between Darkseid and the Anti-Monitor. Owlman has Grid downloaded into Metron's Mobius Chair. Shortly afterward, the two are seemingly destroyed by a powerful entity.

Grid returns in Challenge of the Super Sons (2021), where it battles Superboy and Robin in a virtual reality. Before entering the virtual reality, Robin creates a virus to destroy Grid.

=== Grid in other media ===
- Grid appears in Doom Patrol, voiced by an uncredited actor. Similar to the comics, this version is Cyborg's computer AI. While Cyborg is working with the Doom Patrol, Mr. Nobody manipulates Cyborg into believing Grid has gone rogue by making Grid take control of his cybernetics against his will and attack Silas Stone.
- Grid appears as a character summon in Scribblenauts Unmasked: A DC Comics Adventure.
- Grid appears as a "Premier Skin" for Cyborg in Injustice 2, voiced by Khary Payton. This version is an android clone of Cyborg created by Brainiac.
- Grid appears in Lego DC Super-Villains, voiced by Bumper Robinson. This version is Cyborg's Earth-3 counterpart and a member of the Crime Syndicate. After the Justice League go missing, Grid and the Crime Syndicate pose as the Justice Syndicate to take advantage of the situation. While fighting the Legion of Doom, Grid is defeated and destroyed by Deadshot, Captain Boomerang, the Rookie, Harley Quinn, Catwoman, and Solomon Grundy.

== Gridlock ==
- First appearance: Impulse #7 (October 1995)
- Created by: Martin Pasko; Nick Gnazzo
- Further reading: Gridlock at the Grand Comics Database

Gridlock is an alias used by two supervillains appearing in American comic books published by DC Comics.

=== Abner Girdler ===
Abner Girdler was a specialist in urban planning and new transportation technologies at Technodyne. He proposed to build a monorail in Manchester, Alabama, but the project was scrapped at the last minute by the county transportation commissioner, Clifton Burdett. Having lost the lucrative contract, Technodyne faced bankruptcy, and CEO Leo Nordstrom fired Girdler. Burdett later ran for mayor, and Girdler decided to sabotage his election by donning the guise of Gridlock, equipped with technology able to steal the kinetic energy from people and objects, leaving them in stasis for about an hour. Gridlock kidnapped Nordstrom and froze most of Manchester, but was defeated by Impulse.

=== Second version ===
The second version of Gridlock first appeared in Bat-Mite #2 (September 2015), and was created by Dan Jurgens and Corin Howell. He is a villain who is stuck in the past, despises youth culture, and seeks to stop the future from coming.

=== Gridlock in other media ===
An original incarnation of Gridlock appears in The Flash episode "Nora", portrayed by Daniel Cudmore. This version is William Lang, a kinetic energy-absorbing metahuman. After attacking an airplane, Gridlock is defeated by the Flash, Kid Flash, and XS and later killed by Cicada while being transported to prison.

== Griffin ==
Griffin Grey is a character appearing in The Flash created by Danny Bilson and Paul De Meo set during "One Year Later".

Griffin was a friend of Bart Allen while in Keystone City until he was caught in an explosion at work; he found out he had enhanced speed and strength, and he became a hero, but only for the glory of it coining himself "Griffin" as his name. However, his celebrity status did not last and the powers made him age faster, and he looked like an old man in days. He tried to find the secret of what kept Jay Garrick young, but could not. He then became a villain, and during a fight with Bart as the Flash, he was overpowered and died.

=== Griffin in other media ===
Griffin appears in The Flash episode "Back to Normal", portrayed by Haig Sutherland. This version was granted superhuman strength from S.T.A.R. Labs' particle accelerator explosion, which also caused him to rapidly age. He attempts to find Harry Wells to seek a cure, but ultimately fails and dies in a fight with the Flash.

== Warren Griffith ==
Warren Griffith is a private in the army during World War II who suffered from clinical lycanthropy, believing himself to be a werewolf. He is later turned into an actual werewolf by Myron Mazursky of Project M, with his transformations being independent of the phases of the Moon. Griffith goes on to join the Creature Commandos under the codename Wolfpack.

=== Warren Griffith in other media ===
- Warren Griffith appears in the Batman: The Brave and the Bold episode "Four Star Spectacular!", voiced by Dee Bradley Baker.
- Warren Griffith appears in the "Creature Commandos" segment of DC Nation Shorts, voiced by Dana Snyder.
- Warren Griffith makes a non-speaking appearance in DC Showcase: Sgt. Rock.

== Grimbor the Chainsman ==
Grimbor the Chainsman (Markx Grimbor) is an enemy of the Legion of Super-Heroes who specializes in traps, particularly chains. He was created by Jim Shooter and Mike Grell, and first appeared in Superboy #221 (November 1976).

Grimbor is a master craftsman who creates fail-proof confinement devices. He met his partner, a young mutant named Charma Drisden with mind-control powers, when the headmistress of a school on the planet Mirabeau hired him to devise a way of negating Charma's abilities. Charma's powers include a hypnotic aura that makes men love and protect her but makes other women hate and detest her. Using her powers, Charma persuades Grimbor to use his abilities for crime. Together, they capture the Legion of Super-Heroes and attempt to blackmail R. J. Brande, but are foiled by Shrinking Violet. Unknown to the Legionnaires, Charma is killed while in prison, her powers having earned the wrath of female inmates. Infuriated, Grimbor swears revenge on the Legion. During the storyline "The Exaggerated Death of Ultra Boy", Grimbor attacks the Legion and places a network of energy chains around Earth. The Legion thwarts Grimbor, who is imprisoned in one of his own cells.

In Final Crisis: Legion of 3 Worlds, Grimbor appears as a member of the Legion of Super-Villains.

=== Grimbor the Chainsman in other media ===
Grimbor the Chainsman appears in Legion of Super Heroes, voiced by Lex Lang.

== Groundswell ==
Groundswell is the name of two characters in DC Comics.

=== Point Men member ===
Groundswell is a member of the Point Men, a group who battled Young Justice. His body is made of earthen material, giving him superhuman strength and the ability to manipulate earth.

=== Masters of Disaster member ===
Groundswell is a metahuman with powers over water and a member of the Masters of Disaster.

== Guardian ==
Guardian is the name of several characters appearing in comics published by DC Comics. The character first appeared in Star-Spangled Comics #7 (April 1942), during the Golden Age of Comic Books, and was created by Jack Kirby and Joe Simon.

=== Jim Harper ===
Jim Harper is a police officer in Metropolis' Suicide Slum who becomes a vigilante to catch crooks that the law cannot prosecute, describing himself as guarding society from criminals. Harper was trained by ex-boxer Joe Morgan, who also trained Wildcat and Atom. He has no superpowers, but carries a bulletproof shield. Harper is aided by a group of boys known as the Newsboy Legion, to whom he is literally a guardian, having volunteered to take them in rather than allowing them to be sent to prison.

=== Clones of Jim Harper ===
In Superman's Pal Jimmy Olsen, the members of the Newsboy Legion are reintroduced as adults and leading members of Project Cadmus, a genetics research laboratory. One of the Project's experiments is a clone of Jim Harper, who takes up his predecessor's role and becomes Cadmus's head of security as the Golden Guardian. In post-Crisis continuity, Harper is simply known as Guardian.

Harper remains Cadmus' head of security even after the former Newsboys leave. Eventually, he too is killed, although another clone is created and rapidly aged to adulthood, retaining all his predecessor's memories. This Guardian disappears along with the rest of Cadmus following an altercation with Amanda Waller and Lex Luthor, and his whereabouts are unknown. It is later revealed that the original Guardian clone survived and left Cadmus. Subsequent appearances of the Guardian are new clones, each of which die within a year.

=== Powers and abilities of Guardian ===
The Guardian possesses exceptional combat and tactical skills. He was trained in many forms of fighting, and excelled at gymnastics, thinking quickly on his feet, and deduction. His only weapons are his golden helmet and shield. Guardian often used a customized motorcycle equipped with autopilot and a set of video cameras filming from various angles and recorded on videodisc.

The Jim Harper clone possesses enhanced strength and reflexes, and an accelerated healing factor. As an agent of Cadmus, Harper has access to the Whiz Wagon, a multi-terrain vehicle that can fly and travel underwater.

=== Guardian in other media ===
- The Jim Harper and Mal Duncan incarnations of Guardian appear in Young Justice.
  - Jim Harper (voiced by Crispin Freeman) is a clone of Roy Harper created by the Light to serve their needs. Through programming and hypnosis, Jim operates as a superhero who believes he is Roy's uncle while working for Project Cadmus in the first season. After learning of his true nature, Jim spends the second season searching for Roy and taking part in an intervention for fellow clone Red Arrow before retiring the Guardian identity. In the third season, Outsiders, Jim forms a familial relationship with Red Arrow and Arsenal.
  - Mal Duncan (voiced by Kevin Michael Richardson), a member of the Team, becomes the Guardian in the second-season episode "Cornered".
- Several incarnations of Guardian appear in media set in the Arrowverse:
  - James Harper appears in the Supergirl episode "Manhunter", portrayed by Eddie McClintock. This version is a colonel in the United States Marine Corps.
  - James Olsen (portrayed by Mehcad Brooks) appears as Guardian in the second and third seasons of Supergirl.
  - An alternate reality version of James Olsen / Guardian appears in "Crisis on Earth-X". This version is a member of the Freedom Fighters from Earth-X who wears a costume patterned after the American flag. He is tasked with protecting a temporal gateway from the New Reichsmen, but is killed by Nazi Führer Oliver Queen.
  - In the sixth season of Supergirl, James' sister Kelly Olsen (portrayed by Azie Tesfu) becomes the new Guardian.
- The Mal Duncan incarnation of Guardian makes non-speaking appearances in DC Super Hero Girls as a student of Super Hero High.

== Mike Gunn ==
Mike "Machine" Gunn (also nicknamed Mister Gunn) was a member of Moxie Mannheim's Intergang branch in the 1940s and the lover of Ginny McCree. When Mannheim allied with Dabney Donovan, they created a clone body of Gunn, who gained the ability to transform his hands into guns that shoot bone missiles. The actual Gunn was visited by Lois Lane and Clark Kent. When the police arrived at the house when Lois and Clark were leaving, one of the police officers that entered the house informed the others that Gunn committed suicide by gunshot. Superman confronted the clone of Gunn, demanding to know who he is working for. Gunn intends to tell Superman that he is working for Mannheim, but is disintegrated by a failsafe inside him. A separate clone of Gunn was created after Mannheim and Ginny McCree killed two members of the late Benny Red's gang.

Following a series of encounters with Superman, Gunn is imprisoned. Ginny McCree frees Gunn from prison, but he is shot and killed by the police shortly afterward.

=== Mike Gunn in other media ===
Mike Gunn appears in the Superman & Lois episode "In Cold Blood", portrayed by Arpad Balogh.
