= Blue Jay (character) =

DC Comics superhero

Publication information
- Publisher: DC Comics
- First appearance: Justice League of America #87 (February 1971)
- Created by: Mike Friedrich (writer); Dick Dillin (artist)

In-story information
- Alter ego: Jay Abrams
- Place of origin: Angor
- Team affiliations: Champions of Angor; Justice League Europe; Justice League; Justice League International
- Notable aliases: Massive Man (Earth-8 version only)
- Abilities: Size manipulation Flight with feathery wings Enhanced eyesight

Blue Jay (Jay Abrams) is a DC Comics superhero and a former member of the Champions of Angor, also known as the Justifiers. He has the ability to shrink to 7 in (180 mm) tall and grow blue wings that allow him to fly. Blue Jay is a homage to the Marvel Comics character Yellowjacket. He first appeared in Justice League of America #87 (February 1971).

== Fictional character biography ==
Blue Jay is a member of Champions of Angor, alongside Silver Sorceress and Wandjina. The three are respectively homages to Marvel Comics characters Yellowjacket, Scarlet Witch, and Thor.

After surviving the destruction of Angor, the three come to Earth in an attempt to disarm its nuclear arsenal and save it from a similar fate. Wandjina seemingly sacrifices his life saving Bialya from a nuclear meltdown. Blue Jay and the Sorceress are imprisoned by Russian officials. Both manage to escape, with Blue Jay joining the Justice League.

=== The Extremist Vector ===
While with the League, they confront the Extremists, robotic duplicates of the entities who had destroyed their world. The robots almost do the same to Earth, but are stopped by a combined effort of both teams. It is revealed that Mitch Wacky, a revered member of Blue Jay's world, had created the robotic Extremists but they had gotten out of control. Mitch ran a highly advanced theme park, where the robot Extremists were attractions. Mitch's technological resources had allowed him to survive the nuclear holocaust and he soon makes his way to Earth and a new life. Mitch's subsequent time travel adventure with Kilowog would showcase Blue Jay's old friends and teammates, all analogues of Marvel Comics superheroes.

It turns out that Dreamslayer, one of the Extremists, is not a robotic duplicate, but the real thing.

=== Leader for a mission ===
Blue Jay becomes a member of the Justice League under the command of liaison Catherine Cobert. During his tenure in Justice League Europe, he spends most of his time wracked with self-doubt.

He is one of the many to fall victim to Starro, but Ice stops its invasion. He is eventually made the leader of the European branch of the League. He is assigned by Ambassador Rolf Heimlich, who had been placed in charge of the League by the people of the United Nations. Blue Jay's first mission is to bring back Blue Beetle, Captain Atom, Ice, and Elongated Man. They had all been fired by Heimlich and had teamed together to illegally invade Bialya to uncover the truth behind recent incidents. Inspector Camus discovers the truth behind Heimlich, that he is a mole sent by Queen Bee, the ruler of Bialya. On the flight over, Blue Jay is given valuable leadership advice by Martian Manhunter. The League uncovers Queen Bee's brainwashing plots in an explosion set by Sumaan Harjavti, who then kills the Queen. The explosion itself also almost kills the League but Ice saves the lives of every superhero and the brainwashing victims by forming an ice shield, but she is not able to save all of the local Bialyans, many of whom die. Blue Jay and the League stay long enough to participate in rescue and relief efforts.

=== Losing friends ===
Dreamslayer eventually returns to take over the mind of Justice League financier Maxwell Lord. Dreamslayer enhances Max's persuasion power and takes over the sentient island Kooey Kooey Kooey. Mitch Wacky is kidnapped to recreate the Extremists, but dies shortly afterward. During the Justice League raid on the island, the Sorceress is killed after being shot in the stomach by a brainwashed native.

=== Post-JLE activities ===
Later, Blue Jay, as a reserve member of the Justice League, becomes involved in power struggles involving the Rocket Reds and the villain Sonar.

He is kidnapped by acquisitive aliens, along with dozens of other superhumans. The stowaways, Nightwing and Firestorm, work to release Superman. Their efforts free the hero, along with Skyrocket, Livewire, Veteran, and Aquaman. Doubts about Superman's identity cause a schism in the team, but they work together to restore their powers, damage the facilities of their alien captors, and free everything that had been taken. This destroys the effort of an alien entity called the Auctioneer, who intended to sell off the entities of Earth for a profit.

Due to a mistake by Livewire and the intentional transmissions of the aliens themselves, Blue Jay's efforts, along with the rest of his temporary allies, were broadcast to every television on Earth and to many alien worlds beyond. This makes them intergalactically famous.

=== Justice League of America ===
Blue Jay later appears in the pages of Justice League, where he is apparently killed by a mysterious unknown villain while attempting to warn the Justice League of a plot against them. He is later revealed to have survived and been captured by Doctor Impossible, who plans to use him to resurrect Darkseid. Impossible's efforts instead create a new villain called Omega Man. During the subsequent battle between the JLA and Omega Man, Blue Jay is freed by Supergirl. Blue Jay leaves to explore the multiverse, hoping to find a universe where he can become a true hero.

=== Heroes in Crisis ===
During the Heroes in Crisis storyline, Blue Jay is among the heroes attending the therapy center Sanctuary. He and many other Sanctuary patients are killed in a blast believed to have been caused by Wally West. In The Flash, it is revealed that all of the Sanctuary's attendees survived, with a group of clones having died in their place.

== Powers and abilities ==
Blue Jay is able to shrink himself down to seven inches high. In his shrunken state, he gains a pair of bird-like wings, allowing him to fly.

== Other versions ==
=== Earth-8 Blue Jay ===
The Lord Havok and The Extremists series (2007) features another universe's versions of the Extremists and Champions on Earth-8. The Champions are now part of a group called the Meta-Militia with Tin Man as president of Angor and Americommando as vice president. When Tin Man is killed by Lord Havok, Americommando becomes president with Blue Jay as his vice president. Disgusted by the president's corruption, Blue Jay assists the Extremists in defeating the Meta-Militia, and takes Americommando to stand trial for his crimes.

In his previous identity of Massive Man, the Earth-8 version of Blue Jay was able to increase his height to over 20 feet. It is not known whether this was also true for the main timeline version of Blue Jay.

=== Justice League Europe ===
A biologically ten years older Blue Jay is tossed into the far future by a time-based accident. He ends up in the middle of a Legion of Super Heroes recruitment drive. He is rejected from the Legion and subsequently recruited into the Legion of Substitute Heroes by Polar Boy.

== See also ==
- Justice League Europe
- List of DC Comics characters
