= Justice League Europe =

Comic book series

- Cover to Justice League Europe #1 (April 1989), art by Bart Sears

Publication information
- Publisher: DC Comics
- Schedule: Monthly
- Format: Ongoing series
- Genre: Superhero
- Publication date: List: Justice League Europe April 1989 – 1993 Justice League International (vol. 2) June 1993 – September 1994
- No. of issues: List: Justice League Europe: 50 Justice League International (vol. 2): 17

Creative team
- Created by: Keith Giffen; J. M. DeMatteis
- Written by: List: Justice League Europe Keith Giffen J. M. DeMatteis Gerard Jones Justice League International (vol. 2) Gerard Jones
- Penciller: List: Justice League Europe Bart Sears Darick Robertson Ron Randall Justice League International (vol. 2) Ron Randall Chuck Wojtkiewicz
- Inker: List: Justice League Europe Pablo Marcos Jose Marzan Randy Elliott Justice League International (vol. 2) Roy Richardson
- Colorist: List: Gene D'Angelo

Justice League Europe (JLE) is a comic book series published by DC Comics that was a spin-off of the comic book Justice League America (which was then named Justice League International (vol. 1) for issues #7 to #25).

Justice League Europe was published for 68 issues (plus five Annuals) from 1989 to 1994. Starting with issue #51 the title was renamed Justice League International (vol. 2). Like Justice League America, the series featured tongue-in-cheek humor but was a much more action-centric series than Justice League America.

The action-themed nature of the series was most overt with the story arc "The Extremists". The arc featured the Justice League Europe fighting the Extremists, a cadre of villains patterned after Marvel Comics villains Doctor Doom, Magneto, Doctor Octopus, Sabretooth, and Dormammu.

The team was originally headquartered in Paris, France but later moved to an abandoned castle in Great Britain.

== Publication history ==
=== The Old World Team ===
After the membership of the Justice League had grown to an unwieldy number of characters, DC split it into two teams. The original Justice League Europe consists of:

- Captain Atom (field commander)
- Elongated Man
- Power Girl
- Flash (Wally West)
- Rocket Red
- Animal Man
- Metamorpho
- Catherine Cobert (bureau chief)
- Sue Dibny (information manager, later bureau chief)

Later members of the original team include:

- Crimson Fox (joined issue #10)
- Blue Jay (joined issue #19)
- Silver Sorceress (joined issue #19)

=== Justice League: Breakdowns ===
"Breakdowns" was a 15-issue crossover between the Justice League America and Justice League Europe titles, revising the organization.

Maxwell Lord is initially in a coma from a failed assassination attempt. He is later possessed by JLE foe Dreamslayer of the Extremists and loses his mental abilities.

Queen Bee, ruler of the country Bialya, is killed in a coup led by Sumaan Harjavti, the twin brother of the original ruler, Rumaan.

Despero awakens and escapes Manga Khan's starship to wreak havoc on New York City, seeking vengeance against the League. L-Ron, Khan's robot servant, subdues Despero by using a control collar to swap their bodies.

Dreamslayer later possesses Maxwell Lord's body and moves to Kooey Kooey Kooey, an island where Blue Beetle and Booster Gold previously attempted to open a resort called "Club JLI". He lures the League to the island and mind-controls them, making them the "new Extremists".

The Silver Sorceress, one of the former Champions of Angor and Justice League member, is killed in battle with Dreamslayer and buried on Kooey Kooey Kooey.

The United Nations withdraws its support from the Justice League and it disbands. Martian Manhunter seemingly takes a leave of absence, but re-emerges as Bloodwynd.

Also, the Breakdowns storyline reorganized the JLE. The team relocated to London and several characters left or were replaced. The new lineup starting in issue #37, led by Green Lantern (Hal Jordan) consisted of:

- Flash (Wally West)
- Aquaman
- Doctor Light
- Power Girl
- Crimson Fox
- Elongated Man (and Sue)

=== Expansion ===
The release of Justice League Spectacular launched the revised Justice League titles with new writers and artists. The Justice League titles expanded to four by June 1993: Justice League America (formerly Justice League International), Justice League Europe (retitled as the second volume of Justice League International), Justice League Quarterly, and Justice League Task Force. In late 1994 Justice League International and Justice League Quarterly were cancelled and replaced by a new monthly title in January 1995, Extreme Justice.

With new writers and artists in the various titles coming and going, there was little consistency in continuity and quality. The more powerful and recognizable characters such as Superman, Green Lantern (Hal Jordan), and Batman came and went out of the various Justice League titles, replaced by new or lesser known characters such as Bloodwynd, Maya, Maxima, Nuklon, Obsidian, Tasmanian Devil and Triumph. Longtime JLI-era characters such as Captain Atom, Martian Manhunter and Power Girl were revised and revamped repeatedly, with mixed reviews by the readers.

In the summer of 1996, with sales fading, all three remaining monthly series were cancelled and replaced by JLA.

=== Doomsday Clock ===
In Doomsday Clock, a French version of Justice League Europe is founded, consisting of Crimson Fox, Fleur-de-Lis, Hunchback, Musketeer, Nightrunner, and Thief of Arts.

== Recurring characters ==
- Power Girl's cat
- Batman
- Inspector Camus
- Mitch Wacky
- Beefeater
- Duke Donald
- Godfrey (also known as Gaius)
- Erewhon
- Lionheart
- Seneca
- Osiris

== After Justice League Europe ==
=== La Fraternité de Justice et Liberté ===
Some time after the cancellation of the series, it was revealed in an issue of Starman that Justice League Europe was being reformed (as La Fraternité de Justice et Liberté). The new team consisted of Crimson Fox, Amazing-Man, Blue Devil, Firestorm, and Icemaiden. Icemaiden turned out to be Nash, daughter of Mist who killed Crimson Fox, Blue Devil, and Amazing Man (Blue Devil was later restored to life by Sebastian Faust). It was revealed that Mist covertly contacted Icemaiden and informed her of a supposed threat facing her homeland of Norway, and she must defeat the threat without informing anyone until afterwards. Icemaiden left during the middle of the night, and Mist replaced her within the JLE by the next morning. The JLE did not know that Mist replaced Icemaiden until Mist began her attacks against them. Mist informed Crimson Fox that the threat she informed Icemaiden about was not real, and that she had sent Icemaiden on a fruitless search so that she could disguise herself as Icemaiden and replace her on the team.

- Crimson Fox (Constance D'Aramis)
- Firestorm (Ronnie Raymond)
- Blue Devil
- Amazing-Man (Will Everett III)

=== JLA Showcase #1 ===
In 1999, Greg Weisman wrote a story for DC Comics' JLA Showcase #1, cover-dated February 2000. The one-shot consists of various Justice League stories; Weisman's was set during the time of the Justice League Europe and titled "Flashback Of Notre Dame". The story has Captain Atom, the JLE and Plastique meeting a group of gargoyles at Notre Dame Cathedral. After the usual misunderstanding/battle, the JLE help the gargoyles return to their home island of Brigadoon.

- Captain Atom
- Flash
- Kilowog
- Metamorpho
- Blue Jay

=== Formerly Known as the Justice League / I Can't Believe It's Not the Justice League ===
Several members of this incarnation of the Justice League later formed the Super Buddies, who were featured in the mini-series Formerly Known as the Justice League and later again in the title JLA: Classified with a story called I Can't Believe It's Not the Justice League.

== Writers ==
- Keith Giffen: #1-35, Annual #1
- J. M. DeMatteis: #1-9, 13, Annual #1
- William Messner-Loebs: #10-13
- Gerard Jones: #14-50, Annual #2-3

== Collected editions ==
Title	Material collected	Published date	ISBN
Justice League International Volume 5	Justice League Europe #1–6 and Justice League International Annual #2–3,	January 2011	978-1401230104
Justice League International Volume 6	Justice League Europe #7–11 and Justice League America #31–35	May 2011	978-1401231194
Justice League International Omnibus Vol. 1	Justice League Europe #1-6 and Justice League (vol. 1) #1-6, Annual #1, Justice League International (vol. 1) #7-25, Annual #2-3, Justice League America #26-30, Suicide Squad #13	October 2017	978-1401273866
Justice League International Omnibus Vol. 2	Justice League Europe #7-25, Annual #1 and Justice League America #31-50, Justice League America Annual #4, Justice League Quarterly #1, Justice League International Special #1	November 2020	978-1779502964

== See also ==
- List of Justice League members
