= Doctor Polaris =

- The Neal Emerson incarnation of Doctor Polaris as depicted in The Flash vol. 2 #114 (June 1996). Art by Oscar Jimenez.

Publication information
- Publisher: DC Comics
- First appearance: (Emerson): Green Lantern vol. 2 #21 (June 1963) (Nichol): Justice League of America vol. 2 #17 (March 2008)
- Created by: (Emerson): John Broome (writer); Gil Kane (artist) (Nichol): Brad Meltzer (writer); Gil Kane (artist)

In-story information
- Alter ego: Neal Emerson; John Nichol
- Species: Metahuman
- Place of origin: New Earth
- Team affiliations: Cadre; Secret Society of Super Villains; Black Lantern Corps; Suicide Squad
- Notable aliases: Baxter Timmons; Butcher of the Board Room; Repulse
- Abilities: (Both): Magnetism manipulation; Magnetic force fields; Electromagnetism; Electromagnetic spectrum control; Weather manipulation; Blood manipulation; Flight; (Emerson): Expert physicist and medical specialist; (Nichol): Business intuition

Doctor Polaris is an alias used by two supervillains appearing in American comic books published by DC Comics. The first and most prominent is Neal Emerson, a scientist who can manipulate magnetism.

== Publication history ==
Created by John Broome and Gil Kane, the first Doctor Polaris, Neal Emerson, made his first appearance in Green Lantern #21 (August 1963).

The second Doctor Polaris, John Nichol, first appeared off-panel in Justice League of America vol. 2 #11 (September 2007), before receiving a full introduction in Justice League of America vol. 2 #17 (March 2008). Nichol's origins in this issue were developed by Lilah Sturges and Andre Coelho.

== Fictional character biography ==
=== Neal Emerson ===
Neal Emerson and his brother John were raised by an abusive father (although a later flashback shows him raised by an abusive aunt). This apparently drove Neal Emerson within himself and led to the creation of the personification of his own dark side. Emerson left the United States for a year and returned to find he was an uncle. His brother John and sister-in-law Katherine had adopted a baby and named him Grant. Emerson is not around much for his nephew over the years, but is fond of him.

After time Emerson came to believe he had absorbed too much magnetic energy, and unsuccessfully tries to drain off the excess energy. In desperation, Emerson tries to make a public appeal at a charity event to Green Lantern (Hal Jordan), believing Green Lantern's power ring can help him. However, Emerson's evil personality takes over and robs the box office of the proceeds instead. Polaris tries to draw a magnetic gun on Green Lantern, but is knocked unconscious. At the hospital, Green Lantern probes Polaris' mind, and learns of his evil side. Shortly thereafter, Polaris recovers and attacks Green Lantern with girders and other metal objects. Green Lantern draws Polaris out into the open and defeat him. Doctor Polaris is remanded to police custody, where his "good self" resurfaces.

Years later, Emerson's dark side returns. Returning to his old costume, Polaris takes the name of Baxter Timmons and moves to Metropolis' Suicide Slum, where he steals advanced technology from warehouses throughout the city. Polaris integrates the new magnetic circuits into his costume, as part of an attempt to gain revenge on Green Lantern. Polaris' plans are stopped by Black Lightning.

In "Underworld Unleashed", the Polaris personality sells Emerson's soul to Neron in exchange for increased powers. He serves as Neron's lieutenant before being betrayed by Lex Luthor and the Joker.

Shortly thereafter, Polaris appears in San Francisco, allied with the Cadre. Convinced that civilization and humanity's free will are obstacles for creating a better Earth, he plans to use the Controllers' power and stolen S.T.A.R. Labs equipment to focus his powers and "cleanse the world". The Power Company defeat Polaris by turning Black Mass against his master and using him to drain Polaris' power.

Shortly before "Infinite Crisis", Polaris appears in Metropolis, seeking Superman's help in battling a more powerful and ruthless magnetism manipulator called Repulse. Repulse is later revealed to be a manifestation of his personality disorder and is defeated after Polaris accepts that she is not real.

During "Villains United", Polaris joins Lex Luthor's Secret Society of Super Villains. He is among the villains who ambush the Freedom Fighters in a warehouse south of Metropolis. When Phantom Lady is impaled by Deathstroke, the Human Bomb becomes enraged. After Polaris taunts the Human Bomb, he is blown to pieces by him.

In Blackest Night, Emerson is temporarily revived as a Black Lantern.

Following "The New 52" and "DC Rebirth" relaunches, Neal Emerson appears as a member of Maxwell Lord's supervillain team and a former member of the Suicide Squad.

=== John Nichol ===
John Nichol, a businessman and associate of Intergang, becomes the second Doctor Polaris after the death of Neal Emerson. He battles Blue Beetle, holding a definitive advantage until he is shot in the shoulder by his daughter. During the "Final Crisis" storyline, Polaris appears as a member of Libra's Secret Society. In Blackest Night, Polaris is killed by Neal Emerson, who has returned as a Black Lantern.

== Powers and abilities ==
Both versions of Doctor Polaris possess the power to generate and channel electromagnetism naturally or artificially. They can lift heavy metallic objects, control ferrous particles in the atmosphere, alter Earth's electromagnetic field, fly at subsonic speeds, and project forms of energy related to magnetism. They are able to manipulate the metals within the Earth to create earthquakes, volcanic eruptions, or other disasters. They can also sense metals around them, determine on the distance. The John Nichol incarnation can create localized magnetic storms in people's brains, killing them instantly.

== In other media ==
- The Neal Emerson incarnation of Doctor Polaris appears in Justice League Unlimited, voiced by an uncredited Michael Rosenbaum. This version is a member of Gorilla Grodd's Secret Society who received augmented powers from Lex Luthor, with Luthor implementing failsafes to override Polaris's powers in case he tried to betray Luthor.
- The Neal Emerson incarnation of Doctor Polaris appears in Batman: The Brave and the Bold, voiced by Lex Lang. Additionally, an unnamed, heroic, alternate universe counterpart makes a non-speaking appearance in the episode "Deep Cover for Batman!".
- An unidentified incarnation of Doctor Polaris appears in the "Thunder and Lightning" segments of DC Nation Shorts.
- The John Nichol incarnation of Doctor Polaris appears as a character summon in Scribblenauts Unmasked: A DC Comics Adventure.
