= Champions of Angor =

Fictional team of superheroes in the DC universe

- Champions of Angor in Justice League of America #87.

Publication information
- Publisher: DC Comics
- First appearance: Justice League of America #87 (February 1971)
- Created by: Mike Friedrich (writer); Dick Dillin (artist)

In-story information
- Member(s): Wandjina; Silver Sorceress; Blue Jay; Jack B. Quick; The Bowman; Tin Man; T.A.

The Champions of Angor (also known as the Justifiers, the Assemblers and the Meta Militia) are a fictional team of superheroes in the DC universe. They were created by Mike Friedrich and Dick Dillin in Justice League of America #87 in February 1971.

== Fictional character biography ==
The team was introduced in Justice League of America #87 (February 1971), written by Mike Friedrich. The Champions of Angor come from the alien planet of Angor. When Angor is attacked by a spacefaring robot, they defeat it and track the robot back to its home planet. At the same time, the Justice League of America is defeating and tracking another robot that threatens Earth. Both teams assume the other to be the enemy and confront each other. The original members were:

- Wandjina: The group leader. Named after an Aboriginal Australian weather spirit, he has super-strength and weather control powers.
- Silver Sorceress (Laura Neilsen): A powerful but unpredictable magic-user, with a costume incorporating a headdress.
- Blue Jay (Jay Abrams): A hero with the ability to shrink in size and fly.
- Jack B. Quick (Harry Christos; later known as Captain Speed): A speedster with brief flight abilities.

The team later appear in Keith Giffen's Justice League International with Angor now being an alternate Earth. In issue #2, Wandjina, Blue Jay and Silver Sorceress come to Earth in order to destroy all nuclear weapons, since they were the only survivors of a nuclear disaster that wiped out Angor and did not want the same thing to happen on Earth. Their teammate, Captain Speed, later dies of radiation poisoning. Wandjina sacrifices himself to prevent a nuclear meltdown in Bialya, and the others give themselves up to Russian authorities. Wandjina's corpse is later reanimated as a weapon by Queen Bee of Bialya. The citizens do not understand that Wandjina has died and come to revere him as a hero.

Justice League Europe #15 (June 1990) begins a story in which Silver Sorceress and Blue Jay escape from prison. Blue Jay goes to the League for help, while Silver Sorceress returns to Angor.

A flashback reveals that the nuclear disaster was caused by a group of villains called the Extremists. The Extremists capture Silver Sorceress and make her take them to Earth, where they again attempt to seize control of the world's nuclear weapons. It is eventually revealed that (with one exception) these are robot duplicates of the Extremists, created for an amusement park. The owner of the amusement park is sent to Earth to switch them off. Blue Jay and the Silver Sorceress join Justice League Europe.

Justice League Quarterly #3, by Mike McKone (1991).

Justice League Quarterly #3 (1990) features Mitch Wacky (the amusement park owner) traveling back in time to prevent the Extremists from destroying Angor. This story introduces more members of the team (now called the Justifiers), including:

- The Bowman - An archer, first appearing in one panel of the "Extremist Vector" storyline in Justice League Europe #15-18. Other appearances include "When You Wish..." in Justice League Quarterly #3, the "With a Vengeance!" storyline in Superman/Batman #20-24, and in the Lord Havok and the Extremists series.
- Tin Man - An armored hero with a heart condition.
- T.A. - A heroine with metal wings.
- Bug - A hero in Justice League Quarterly #3 and as a villain in "With a Vengeance!"

In 2008's Final Crisis storyline, the Justifiers are controlled by the Anti-Life Equation, and "justify" Darkseid's rule of the Earth.

== Other versions ==
=== Lord Havok and The Extremists ===
In the Lord Havok and The Extremists series (2007), new versions of the Champions are featured on Earth-8. In this storyline, they are part of a group called the Meta-Militia with Tin Man as president of Angor and Americommando as vice president. When Tin Man is killed by Lord Havok, Americommando becomes president with Blue Jay as Vice President. Americommando is sleeping with T.A. behind Blue Jay's back. Blue Jay eventually turns against Americommando. Blue Jay, having forged an alliance with Monarch, arrests Americommando for crimes against humanity and takes his place as president. Wandjina is also featured, now a closeted homosexual. During a battle between the Meta-Militia and the Extremists, he is swallowed whole by Gorgon.

=== The New 52: Earth 7 and Earth 8 ===
Two versions of the Champions of Angor are introduced in the first issue of Grant Morrison's The Multiversity series. In the DC Multiverse following its The New 52 reboot, Earth-7 and Earth-8 are sister worlds. In the beginning of The Multiversity, a terrible evil comes to Earth-7 and destroys it, leaving its only hero as Thor-equivalent Thunderer (whose closest counterpart is Wundajin of Earth-8).

While Earth 8 continues to feature Lord Havok, the Champions of Angor are replaced by the Rampaging Retaliators. The other residents of Earth-8 include:

- The Future Family, led by Frank Future; Lord Havok claims to be his "greatest creation".
- The G-Men, "neo-humans".
- American Crusader, a member of the Retaliators.
- Wundajin, who possesses a "lightning axe", identical in appearance to the Champions of Angor's Wandjina and is a member of the Retaliators.
- Behemoth (David Dibble), who grows into a giant blue infant when angered.
- Machinehead, and member of the Retaliators.
- Ladybug, a member of the Retaliators.
- The Bug, known as "The Hero You Hate to Love".
- Kite.
- Deadeye.
- Red Dragon.
- Major Max.
- Stuntmaster.
