= Beefeater (disambiguation) =

Beefeater is a term often used to refer to the Yeomen Warders of the Tower of London, but originally referring to the Yeomen of the Guard.

Beefeater may also refer to:

- Beefeater Gin, a British brand of spirits
- Beefeater (restaurant), a former chain of pub restaurants in the UK, owned by Whitbread Group PLC
- The Beefeaters, a Danish beat group (1964–1971)
- Beefeater (band), a short-lived American punk rock band
- Beefeater (character), a DC Comics superhero from the United Kingdom who bore a similarity to Basil Fawlty
- The Byrds, an American rock band originally named the Beefeaters
