= Shatterfist =

Shatterfist is a name of two different fictional character properties:

- Shatterfist (DC Comics)
- Shatterfist (Marvel Comics)
