= Crimson Fox =

- Crimson Fox from the cover of Justice League Europe #23.

Publication information
- Publisher: DC Comics
- First appearance: Justice League Europe #6 (September 1989)
- Created by: Keith Giffen; Bart Sears

In-story information
- Alter ego: Vivian D'Aramis; Constance D'Aramis; Unknown
- Team affiliations: (Vivian, Constance); Justice League Europe; Justice League; Université Notre Dame des Ombres (Unknown); Global Guardians; Justice League Europe
- Notable aliases: Red Fox, La Renarde Rousse
- Abilities: (Vivian, Constance); Animal speed and agility, pheromone control (Constance); Enhanced senses (Unknown); Pheromone control

Crimson Fox is a codename for two superheroines appearing in American comic books published by DC Comics.

== Publication history ==
The first two holders of the Crimson Fox moniker first appeared in Justice League Europe #6 and were created by Keith Giffen and Bart Sears. Identical twins, Vivian and Constance D'Aramis shared the role of Crimson Fox to allow each something of a normal life, although Vivian was much more enthusiastic about their superheroic life. Crimson Fox originally appeared as part of Justice League Europe.

The unrevealed Crimson Fox first appeared in Green Lantern vol. 4 #11.

== Fictional character biography ==
=== Vivian and Constance D'Aramis ===
The sisters ran Revson, a major Parisian perfume company (which may perhaps explain the origin of their pheromone powers). To make their heroic actions easier, they faked Constance's death, so that one of them could operate as Crimson Fox (La Renard Rouge or La Renard Rousse in French) (Note: While the French names literally translate to "Red Fox," DC was concerned about copyright violation regarding a pre-existing comics character known as Redfox, published in the United Kingdom.) while the other attended business functions. Readers of her/their comic book appearances could easily tell the difference between the two due to Vivian's more pronounced French accent. She was also always portrayed as a more carefree and outgoing woman than her sister. Both sisters (first Vivian, and later Constance) fell in love with fellow hero Metamorpho.

The first two Crimson Foxes are currently deceased. Vivian D'Aramis was killed by French supervillain Puanteur in Justice League America #104 (1995); Constance became much more ruthless and cold as a result. When the Justice League Europe team was reformed as La Fraternité de Justice et Liberté, the team did not know that member Icemaiden had been surreptitiously replaced by Nash, the daughter of supervillain Mist. Nash went on to kill the second Crimson Fox, Blue Devil, and Amazing Man in Starman #38 (1998).

=== Unrevealed ===
One Year Later in the pages of Green Lantern (vol. 4) #11 (2006), it was revealed that a third Crimson Fox has been operating in Paris. She was unwillingly pressed into service and membership by the Global Guardians, who intended to pursue Green Lantern.

The new Crimson Fox told Hal Jordan that she is the heiress to the D'Aramis fortune to explain how she came into possession of her costume and abilities, though her specific relationship to Vivian and Constance, as family or otherwise, remains unknown.

== Powers and abilities ==
The original Crimson Fox twins had superhuman speed and agility and could emit pheromones that stimulated intense sexual attraction in men. The origin of their powers was not clearly explained, though it was suggested that they came from genetic manipulation resulting from experiments into enhancing the potency and effects of certain perfumes.

Both sisters wore a special costume with a long hood that showed only their faces, and used metal talons on their gloves for fighting, climbing, and exploration. Following Vivian's death, Constance experimented on herself again and developed animal-like senses that allowed her to hear, smell, and see at ranges beyond the limits of human physiology. A side-effect, however, was that she also became more animalistic in her behavior.

The new Crimson Fox has a similarly equipped costume as the previous versions and seems to possess identical pheromone powers.

== In other media ==
=== Television ===
- An unidentified Crimson Fox makes non-speaking appearances in Justice League Unlimited as a member of the Justice League.
- An unidentified Crimson Fox appears in Powerless, portrayed by Atlin Mitchell in the pilot episode "Wayne or Lose" and by Deanna Russo in subsequent episodes.

=== Merchandise ===
The Vivian D'Aramis incarnation of Crimson Fox received an action figure in Mattel's Justice League Unlimited toyline as part of a six-pack. Mattel planned to release individual figures of Crimson Fox, but the line was cancelled.
