= Silver Sorceress =

- Silver Sorceress as depicted in Justice League Europe #35 (February 1992). Art by Darick Robertson.

Publication information
- Publisher: DC Comics
- First appearance: Justice League of America #87 (February 1971)
- Created by: Mike Friedrich; Dick Dillin

In-story information
- Alter ego: Laura Cynthia Neilsen
- Team affiliations: Justice League Europe; Champions of Angor; Justice League; Justice League International
- Abilities: Magical abilities

The Silver Sorceress (Laura Cynthia Neilsen) is a DC Comics character and member of the Champions of Angor. She first appeared in Justice League of America #87, (February 1971), and is a homage to the Scarlet Witch. As her name suggests, she possesses magical powers which have become more advanced over time.

== Fictional character biography ==
The Silver Sorceress, Blue Jay and Wandjina (based on Marvel Comics characters Scarlet Witch, Yellowjacket, and Thor, respectively) come from an alternate Earth, the only survivors of a nuclear holocaust. They come to Earth after being manipulated into seeking revenge for the destruction of their world against the Justice League. After initially mistaking each other for villains, the two teams unite to fight the robots who had manipulated them both.

The Sorceress later has the pleasure of meeting and rescuing one of the few survivors of her world, a celebrity entertainer known as Mitch Wacky (a parody of Walt Disney). Silver Sorceress helps the League confront and battle the Extremists, robotic duplicates of the entities who ravaged her world.

She remains with the team as an active member until her death at the hands of Dreamslayer, one of the entities who had destroyed her old world. Dreamslayer manages to take over the mind of Maxwell Lord, a close friend and leader of various aspects of the Justice League. Using Lord's persuasion powers, he takes over the mobile island of Kooey Kooey Kooey, using it and Mitch Wacky as a base to rebuild the Extremists. When Wacky is not needed anymore, he is brutally killed. Silver and the League attack the island and its natives are brainwashed into fighting back. Silver falls victim to the reluctance to hurt the innocent natives and she ends up shot in the stomach with an arrow. As she dies, she manages to subdue and entrap Dreamslayer, temporarily ending his threat. The League members bury Silver Sorceress on Kooey Kooey Kooey.

== Powers and abilities ==
Silver Sorceress is a magic user of advanced abilities. While she had to use a combination of magic and technology to create the original doorway from Angor to that of the Justice League, she is later able to do so with magic alone.

== Other versions ==
- An alternate timeline version of Silver Sorceress appears in Justice League Europe Annual #2.
- An unrelated Silver Sorceress appears in Showcase #63 (July 1966).
- Silver Sorceress appears in JLA/Avengers #4.
- Anna, an alternate universe version of Silver Sorceress from Earth-8, appears in Lord Havok and the Extremists #5.
