= Dreamslayer =

- Dreamslayer as depicted in Justice League Europe #15 (June 1990). Art by Bart Sears (penciler), Pablo Marcos (inker), and Gene D'Angelo (colorist).

Publication information
- Publisher: DC Comics
- First appearance: Justice League Europe #15 (June 1990)
- Created by: Keith Giffen (writer); Gerard Jones (writer); Bart Sears (artist)

In-story information
- Species: Demon
- Place of origin: Angor
- Team affiliations: Extremists
- Abilities: Vast magical abilities; Command legions of demons; Eldritch blasts; Spell casting; Superhuman strength; Superhuman endurance; Flight; Fire generation; Fire projection; Matter transmutation; Mind reading; Telepathy; Telekinesis; Time travel; Teleportation; Longevity; Power augmentation

Dreamslayer is a supervillain appearing in comic books published by DC Comics. He is part of the Extremists, a villainous group whose members are all based on an existing Marvel Comics villain. In Dreamslayer's case, he is based on the villain Dormammu. Dreamslayer first appeared in Justice League Europe #15 (June 1990), and was created by Keith Giffen, Gerard Jones and Bart Sears.

== Fictional character biography ==
Dreamslayer is a member of the Extremists and worked with them to kill most people on Angor, their home planet. He travels to Earth with the four surviving humans of his world: Mitch Wacky, Wandjina, Silver Sorceress and Blue Jay. Dreamslayer kidnaps Wacky, then forces him to create robotic replicas of his comrades. Wacky is forced to work around the clock on the robots; in the end, he is only able to create a robot version of Lord Havok due to limited supplies. Dreamslayer kills Wacky as soon as Havok is functional.

The Silver Sorceress attacks the island, along with her Justice League comrades. The natives of the island, mentally controlled by Dreamslayer, attack. The League's desire to not hurt the natives costs the Sorceress her life, as she is hit with an arrow in the stomach. Before dying, she neutralizes Dreamslayer in a mystical battle. Dreamslayer has returned more than once, to plague Supergirl and the Justice League. He was used and tricked by the villain Overmaster.

== Other versions ==
- Dreamslayer appears in JLA/Avengers #4.
- An alternate universe version of Dreamslayer appears in Countdown Presents: Lord Havok and the Extremists. This version is the self-proclaimed god of his own religion, Dreamology. In issue #4, Dreamslayer is revealed to be a demon who gathered followers to honor him and bring forth a suitable host vessel. Dreamslayer possesses Louie Marino and kills his followers before a cloaked man (later revealed to be Lord Havok) casts a spell to weaken him. Havok transfers Dreamslayer's consciousness out of Marino's body and into the body of Marino's sister Louise, hoping that she would be able to suppress Dreamslayer's mind.

== Powers and abilities ==
Dreamslayer is a supernatural being or powerful sorcerer whose magic is drawn from the dimension of terrors which he rules over. He has superhuman strength and endurance, immunity to physical and energy attacks, can fly, project flame, teleport, read minds, communicate with telepathy, and manipulate matter. He is a wraith-like being who is unlikely to be killed by conventional means, even surviving the nuclear event on Angor. When taking over a person's body, he can supercharge any metahuman abilities they have.

The Earth-8 version of Dreamslayer has the same magical abilities, including the power to freeze a whole city in time.

== In other media ==
- Dreamslayer appears in the Justice League Unlimited episode "Shadow of the Hawk", voiced by John DiMaggio.
- Dreamslayer appears as a character summon in Scribblenauts Unmasked: A DC Comics Adventure.
