= Amazing-Man (DC Comics) =

- Will Everett from All-Star Squadron #23, artist Jerry Ordway.

Publication information
- Publisher: DC Comics
- First appearance: (1940s); All-Star Squadron (later appeared in "The Flash vs Arrow" #23 (July 1983)) (1990s); Justice League America #86 (March 1994) (2000s); Justice Society of America vol. 3 #12 (March 2008) (2010s); OMAC #2 vol. 3 (December 2011)
- Created by: (1940s); Roy Thomas (writer); Jerry Ordway (artist) (1990s); Dan Vado (writer); Marc Campos (artist) (2000s); Geoff Johns (writer); Dale Eaglesham (artist) (2010s); Dan DiDio (writer); Keith Giffen (artist)

In-story information
- Alter ego: (1940s); William Blake "Will" Everett (1990s); William Blake "Will" Everett III (2000s); Markus Clay (2010s); Rocker Bonn
- Species: Metahuman
- Team affiliations: (1940s); All-Star Squadron (1990s); Justice League America; Extreme Justice; Justice League (2000s); Justice Society of America (2010s); Checkmate
- Abilities: (All); Ability to duplicate the properties of matter and energy via physical contact (Will Everett); Magnetic powers (Will Everett III); Energy absorption and duplication

Amazing-Man is the name used by four fictional characters published by DC Comics. The first three are African-American superheroes and are members of the same family. The first Amazing-Man debuted in All-Star Squadron #23 (July 1983), and was created by Roy Thomas and Jerry Ordway. The second Amazing-Man debuted in Justice League America #86 (March 1994), and was created by Dan Vado and Marc Campos. The third Amazing-Man debuted in Justice Society of America vol. 3 #12 (March 2008), and was created by Geoff Johns and Dale Eaglesham. The fourth Amazing Man debuted in OMAC vol. 3 #2 (December 2011), and was created by Dan DiDio and Keith Giffen.

== Publication history ==
Although a 1980s creation of writer Roy Thomas, the Amazing-Man published by DC Comics was placed in the 1940s and made a contemporary of various Golden Age superheroes. The character was created by Roy Thomas as a tribute to Bill Everett's Amazing-Man, a character he created for Centaur Publications during the so-called Golden Age of Comic Books.

== Fictional character biography ==
=== Will Everett ===
Will Everett was a promising young African-American Olympian who had competed in the 1936 Summer Olympics in Berlin, but his post-Olympic career devolved into a janitorial profession at a laboratory owned by Terry Curtis. Following an accident involving the explosion of some equipment to which he was exposed (developed by the Ultra-Humanite), Everett quickly developed the ability to mimic whatever properties he touched.

Everett is initially employed by the Ultra-Humanite as a henchman along with Curtis (as Cyclotron) and Deathbolt. However, he reforms after encountering the All-Star Squadron, whom he joins to stop the Ultra-Humanite. He then serves a lengthy stint as a member of the Squadron.

During Crisis on Infinite Earths, Amazing-Man is among the heroes chosen by the Monitor to stop the Anti-Monitor. He loses his original abilities and gains the ability to manipulate magnetism.

In the 1950s, Everett's secret identity is made public by J. Edgar Hoover, endangering the lives of his wife and family. During the civil rights movement of the 1960s, Everett's nephew is murdered, spurring him to become involved in the civil rights movement. He leads marches against segregation across the United States, and also helps to quell riots in Detroit. Everett is also responsible for the capture of Martin Luther King Jr.'s murderer, James Earl Ray. In the DC Comics universe, he is considered the third most important advocate for African American rights, behind only King and Malcolm X.

It was later revealed that his grandson, Will Everett III (a.k.a. "Junior"), developed mimicry abilities similar to his own. Will Everett Sr. later dies from cancer, with his grandson succeeding him as Amazing-Man.

=== Will Everett III ===
Will Everett III and Maxima, artist Tom Morgan.

Will Everett III carries on his grandfather's heroic tradition, joining the Justice League at Wonder Woman's request. As a member of the Justice League, he is instrumental in defeating the Overmaster alongside the other members of the League and reformed members of the Cadre. Soon after this, Captain Atom forms a splinter group of the JLA nicknamed Extreme Justice. Will remains with the team until it disbands.

Later, Will joins the Crimson Fox's unofficial re-grouping of Justice League Europe. In their single ill-fated adventure, Will is killed by Mist, who tricks him into mimicking glass and shatters his body.

=== Markus Clay ===
The third Amazing-Man is Markus Clay, who operates out of New Orleans, Louisiana. He is Will Everett's other grandson, and the cousin of Will Everett III. A recent recruit of the Justice Society of America, he has helped the team communicate with Gog. After Gog's defeat, Markus returns to New Orleans and considers forming a team of his own.

=== Rocker Bonn ===
A new Amazing-Man, Rocker Bonn, is introduced following the events of Flashpoint and the subsequent relaunch The New 52. He is a former agent of Checkmate who was given metahuman abilities by Project Cadmus. After going into hiding in Texas, Bonn is attacked by Kevin Kho, the new OMAC. Bonn is defeated by Kho and subsequently absorbed by Brother Eye, who states that he may prove useful at a later date.

== Powers and abilities ==
All versions of Amazing-Man can mimic the properties of materials via touch. The Will Everett Sr. incarnation later developed the ability to manipulate magnetism.

== In other media ==
The Will Everett incarnation of Amazing-Man appears in Justice League: Crisis on Infinite Earths, voiced by Ike Amadi.
