= Lazarus Planet =

2023 comic book storyline

- Publisher: DC Comics
- Publication date: January – February 2023
- Genre: Superhero
Title(s)
- Lazarus Planet
- Lazarus Planet: Revenge of the Gods
- Main character(s): Batman; Damian Wayne; Monkey Prince; Black Alice; Nezha; King Fire Bull

Creative team
- Writer(s): Mark Waid, Gene Luen Yang
- Artist(s): Ricardo Federici, Billy Tan
- Penciller(s): Ricardo Federici, Billy Tan
- Letterer: Steve Wands
- Colorist(s): Brad Anderson, Sebastian Cheng
- Editor: Paul Kaminski

"Lazarus Planet" is a 2023 American comic book crossover storyline written by Mark Waid and Gene Luen Yang, with art by Ricardo Federici and Billy Tan published by DC Comics. The event involves Chinese deities-turned demons Nezha and King Fire Bull, whose conflict causes a volcano on Lazarus Island to erupt, causing global magic storms that both give superpowers and alter existing ones. The event received positive reviews, with critics praising the art, action, and main story while criticizing the tie-ins.

== Publication history ==
In October 2022, during New York Comic Con, DC Comics announced a new event called Lazarus Planet which, along with Dark Crisis on Infinite Earths, would kickstart Dawn of DC. Batman/Superman: World's Finest (issues #1–5) and the Batman vs. Robin act as a prelude to Lazarus Planet. Lazarus Planet was followed up with a sequel called Lazarus Planet: Revenge of the Gods where Wonder Woman and Shazam fight. It was written by G. Willow Wilson, Becky Cloonan, Michael Conrad, and Josie Campbell and ran through the pages of Wonder Woman and the titular miniseries.

== Plot ==
=== Prelude ===
During Batman and Robin's early adventures, they team up with Superman and the Doom Patrol to deal with the demon Nezha who was wreaking havoc in Gotham City and Metropolis. The Doom Patrol explain that over three millennia ago, Nezha was originally a human and the son of powerful war general Li Jing. After Nezha died in battle at a young age, Li gave up his wealth and power to resurrect him, eventually entering the servitude of a magician who gave him the elixir of immortality out of pity.

Nezha was resurrected by the elixir, but was enraged at his father and killed him. Nezha rebuilt his father's empire, made deals with demons and obtained magical weapons, becoming a demon. To stop Nezha, warriors from the House of Ji imprisoned him. In the 21st century, Nezha creates a new spell to free himself but is disgusted with how humans had advanced and desires to control the world.

Batman and Superman manage to stop Nezha by trapping him in the Phantom Zone, but he attempts to escape. Superman pushes Nezha and himself in Nezha's prison on Lazarus Island before escaping.

In the present, while Damian Wayne participates in a tournament on Lazarus Island, it is revealed that his great-grandmother, Mother's Soul, was brought back to life due to the Lazarus Pits, with Mother's Soul saying that they must free Nezha once more or else the world will be destroyed. One night, Bruce Wayne sees Alfred Pennyworth appear in front of him, which makes Bruce suspicious since he was killed by Bane during the City of Bane storyline. Bruce tests Alfred on a series of questions to make sure Alfred is not the imposter, and while in the Batcave they see a possessed Damian, Jakeem Thunder and Timothy Hunter. Batman subdues the Hunters but Damian wounds him and escapes to meet up with Nezha and Mother Soul, who have sent various malicious mystics to capture powerful relics across the world, causing Earth's magic to go into havoc.

Investigating the magic imbalance, Batman tries meeting with Zatanna but finds her hanging, but Zatanna reveals she is alive with Justice League Dark being preoccupied by Nezha's magic. Batman goes to Kentucky to meet a magician, Abel, where he learns about Damian's recent tournament on Lazarus Island, and learns that Mother Soul is the mother of Ra's al Ghul and that the Lazarus Pits are derived from Nezha's elixir. Batman realizes that Nezha corrupted Damian and tricked him into freeing himself from his prison, and has taken control of Dick Grayson, Tim Drake, Jason Todd, and Stephanie Brown.

While traveling to Lazarus Island, Batman realizes that Nezha has incapacitated Barbara Gordon and Batwoman while Talia al Ghul is held prisoner by Damian and Mother Soul. Nezha captures his old friend Pigsy and discovers that his son King Fire Bull has resurfaced on Earth with his own plans for world domination while Mother Soul forces the captured Black Alice to augment Doctor Fate's helmet with stolen magic. Batman defeats all the former Robins and allows Alfred to be killed by Nezha, revealing that he knew Alfred was fake when Alfred answered all of Batman's questions when they first met, but not contradict Batman's question when Nezha thought Batman was telling the truth. Alfred tells Batman to try to reconcile with Damian before dying once more.

Damian confronts Batman who struggles due to his battles with the former Robins, but it is revealed that Batman freed Talia and disarms Nezha long enough for Batman to obtain Doctor Fate's helmet and frees everyone from Nezha's influence as well as teleports them away except Pigsy and Black Alice. Damian and Talia fight off Mother Soul where Mother Soul falls over a cliff. During the fight, Nezha mortally wounds Batman, but King Fire Bull arrives and fights Nezha off while Talia and Damian revive Batman by using Alice's and Pigsy's magic. Nezha flees, and King Fire Bull causes the Lazarus Volcano to explode.

=== Main plot ===
==== Alpha ====
Damian flies Batman, Talia, and Black Alice out of the Lazarus Volcano while Supergirl notes that there is a big storm wreaking havoc on Earth. Damian and his group crash into the Hall of Justice where Supergirl, Power Girl, Blue Beetle, Mary Marvel, the Monkey Prince, Zatanna, Cyborg, and Blue Devil are. Damian brings everyone up to speed on what has happened and that King Fire Bull is responsible for the storm. Zatanna notices that magic in general has gotten out of control, so Damian sends Mary, Zatanna, Cyborg, Blue Beetle and Power Girl to collect magical artifacts in the Tower of Fate, while Batman, Talia, and Supergirl will find Nezha in the Himalayas. While trying to breach the tower, Cyborg and Blue Beetle are attacked by King Fire Bull's bodyguard, the Silver Horn King.

Batman's group are confronted by King Fire Bull's other bodyguard, the Golden Horn King. While Blue Beetle and Supergirl distract the Golden Horn King, Batman and Talia are shocked to see Nezha being attacked by Swamp Thing and Poison Ivy, who are angered that the Lazarus Volcano explosion is poisoning the plants and Earth. Batman's group defeats Nezha, but Nezha's body slowly corrupts Batman, turning him into a demon. Mary Marvel's group gets closer to the Tower, and Mary yells her name, which causes people who were imprisoned by Nezha to be free. Damian is trying to figure out what is going on when he is suddenly confronted by Fire King Bull.

One of Pigsy's clones visits the Monkey Prince at the Hall and explains Nezha's and King Fire Bull's origins. During his initial conquest as the Devil Nezha, the Chinese gods offered Nezha a chance at redemption, taking him to the Heavenly Realm and gifting him the Red Armillary Sash, which suppressed his evil and reverted him to human form. Nezha ascended to deity status and became acquainted with Pigsy and his companions Monkey King and Sandy during their quest to reunite with their master. Following the war between Apokolips and the Heavenly Realm centuries ago, Nezha adopted Red Boy as his son after Darkseid murdered his parents King Bull Demon and Princess Iron Fan. Red Boy would later be consumed by his hate, eventually becoming the demonic King Fire Bull.

==== Omega ====
King Fire Bull is about to kill Black Alice but Zatanna tries to teleport Alice away to save her. Nezha prevents Alice from teleporting away and nearly rips her in half, but Monkey Prince arrives to save her. Hal Jordan, Superman, Jon Kent, Martian Manhunter, Yara Flor, Barry Allen and Sojourner Mullein arrive to apprehend King Fire Bull, but King Fire Bull manipulates the Lazarus Explosion to gain more power. Alice teleports to Zatanna and plans to absorb all of the Earth's magic at once. Alice makes Jim Corrigan the Spectre once more as well as have Enchantress use magic on her to seemingly sacrifice herself, which allows Nezha (possessing Batman) to find King Fire Bull. Nezha shoots lightning at King Fire Bull by channeling power from the Lazarus Explosion, which severely weakens King Fire Bull, and allows Zatanna and the rest of the magical users to appear in front of King Fire Bull. They manage to imprison King Fire Bull, but Zatanna warns Damian that magic will be more unpredictable before leaving. Damian sees Batman and hugs him, but is unaware that Nezha is still controlling him.

=== Side plots ===
==== Assault on Krypton ====
While talking to Cat Grant about being part of the Daily Planet, Nia Nal is knocked unconscious after entering Batman's dream and the eruption of Lazarus Volcano. She arrives and meets up with Kara Zor-El and Damian where she gets brought up to speed and tells them the future has gone dark. Batman wakes up and tells Nia that the only way for them to know the true future is to get the Doctor Fate helmet from Khalid Nassour. Nia Nal enters Khalid's dream and retrieves the helmet, but Khalid does not recognize her. Meanwhile, Jon Kent confronts an individual who gains new powers due to the explosion on Lazarus Island. Mercy Graves is exposed to Lazarus resin and transformed into a cyborg metahuman. Power Girl suffers from hallucinations, but escapes with help from Lilith Clay.

==== We Once Were Gods ====
A family encounters a regular human washed up on the shore. However, it is revealed that the human was originally one of the amphibious monsters in the Trench and starts attacking the family, but Aquaman intervenes and saves them. Martian Manhunter observes how the eruption from the Lazarus Volcano has given everyone new powers. He observes an empath named Raphael Arce, who tries to absorb all the pain from people who are painfully dying. Wonder Woman is sparring with a woman named Bia when Bia is taken by an undead Theseus and his army. Wonder Woman saves Bia from Theseus and with the help of Nubia, they defeat Theseus. Theseus reveals that the explosion from the Lazarus Volcano has opened the gates of Hades, allowing the undead to return to the mortal world. Mary Marvel meets Black Adam's new heir Malik, and they try to free Billy Batson from the Rock of Eternity. They reach Batson, who frees himself by absorbing the Rock of Eternity, but the wizard Shazam is angry at this and declares the Shazam family unworthy.

==== Legends Reborn ====
Renee Montoya learns that a man named George Dennis Elroy (a suspect who killed ten people) mysteriously disappeared. She learns that there was a victim who had body eaten by something sinister. Montoya goes into Elroy's apartment where she sees hostages there and confronts a monstrous Elroy but Elroy is defeated by her and the hostages. Raven and Beast Boy go see a house where a demon child is located, and exorcise the demon. The demons explain that they were originally humans but the explosion from the Lazarus Volcano mutated them. Trigon dispatches Beast Boy, knocks out Raven, and takes the demons away. In Gotham City, Nightwing rescues City Boy, who tries to go get a family heirloom in the sewers. Firestorm is flying when the Lazarus explosion separates him and Martin Stein. He partners with S.T.A.R. Labs scientist Dr. Ramirez to defeat the shadow demon, but realizes that the Firestorm matrix has been corrupted by Lazarus resin, causing it to steal the youth of its secondary host for power. Stein is left aged and near death, while Ramirez cannot leave the Firestorm matrix without risking the same happening to him.

==== Next Evolution ====
Red Hood stops a group of vigilantes called the Vigil from obtaining leftover Lazarus resin. Damian's girlfriend Flatline goes to Tokyo to confront Ubu, Ra's al Ghul's bodyguard. Flatline fights off Ubu and his bodyguards to find an urn that has the ashes of Ra's al Ghul and sees him in front of her. Deadeye confronts his aunt Amanda Waller who reveals she is on Earth-Three. Deadeye explains how his shape-shifter partner Everyman was changed by the Lazarus explosion, and tried killing him. Red Canary tries studying for her chemistry test when she observes people being mutated by the Lazarus eruption. She asks for Sideways' help in dealing with the pigs.

==== Monkey Prince ====
Monkey Prince confronts Ultra-Humanite and his assistant and son-in-law Winston Shugel-Shen, the Monkey Prince's adoptive father, who are attempting to fix their Phantom Zone projector to capture the imprisoned Monkey King. During the scuffle, Winston is knocked unconscious and the Projector activates, sending the Monkey Prince to the Phantom Zone, where he meets the Monkey King, his real father, for the first time. The Monkey King uses his abilities to view the Monkey Prince's memories and is informed of conflict between Nezha and King Fire Bull. Realizing that Nezha has become corrupted without the Red Armillary Sash, the Monkey King implores his son to defeat Nezha and King Fire Bull and to seek out his mentor Tripiṭaka to help him escape his imprisonment from the Phantom Zone. Meanwhile, Ultra-Humanite deduces that the Monkey Prince is his adoptive grandson and injects him with nanobots to put him under his control.

==== Dark Fate ====
Huntress goes to Arkham Tower and confronts Onomatopoeia and other serial killers who are being controlled by Killer Moth due to the Lazarus Explosion. The Doom Patrol are confronted by monstrous clowns who are a kidnapped group of military men. Julien Jourdain and their friend Micah receive powers from the Still Force and Avery Ho confronts them to offer help. While visiting their grandmother's grave in Gotham City's Chinatown, demon hunter Xanthe Zhou fends off an attack from several jiangshi with help from Cassandra Cain. John Constantine arrives to track down necromantic energy but the necromantic energy appears and captures Cain.

=== Aftermath ===
==== Batman vs. Robin ====
Possessing Batman's body, Nezha takes Damian back to the Batcave and demands King Fire Bull's whereabouts. Damian is able to escape the Batcave on his motorcycle but Nezha takes control of a Batmobile and gives chase. Talia radios Damian and informs him that Nezha's spirit has left his body and has been fully transferred into his father but warns him that exorcising Nezha would cause Batman to die from his earlier wounds. The Monkey Prince arrives and rescues Damian from Nezha and informs him that Nezha will become stronger the longer he stays in Batman's body. Damian formulates a plan to defeat Nezha and save his father. Damain lures Nezha to a Gotham City rooftop, where he, the Bat-Family (Nightwing, Red Hood, Tim Drake, Barbara Gordon, Cassandra Cain and Stephanie Brown) and the Monkey Prince subdue Nezha long enough for Zatanna, Enchantress and Pigsy to arrive with Nezha's body. The three sorcerers transfer and bind Nezha's spirit back into his body with the Red Armillary Sash, but Batman is mortally wounded. Damian offers his own life to save his father, but is told that his soul alone will not be able to save Batman. With Oracle's technology, Damian broadcasts a message to Gotham's citizens, urging them to help Batman. Damian's words allow Gotham's citizens to give up small pieces of their souls and resurrect Batman. The next morning, Damian confirms that Lazarus Island has been evacuated, the Lazarus Resin has disappeared, and Nezha and King Fire Bull have been imprisoned. Damian reconciles with Batman and comments that there is no team more formidable than Batman and Robin.

==== Monkey Prince ====
An unnamed Chinese demoness and her skeletal soldiers release a weakened King Fire Bull from his prison in the Atlantic Ocean. The Monkey Prince, Pigsy, and Supergirl clean up Metropolis and are assisted by Princess Shellestriah, who wishes to be trained by Pigsy. The demoness' soldiers attack the four and while the Monkey Prince fights them off with his clones, some of the soldiers reveal that the Monkey Prince is not the Monkey King's son but a clone of the Monkey King who refused to revert into hair. While the Monkey Prince is shaken by the revelation, the soldiers are able to capture Supergirl due to her weakness to magic and take her to King Fire Bull's lair, who proceeds to consume her qi to revitalize himself. While the three pursue the soldiers, Pigsy views the Monkey Prince's memories which confirm he was a clone created from the King's hairs. However, Pigsy explains that the Monkey Prince's inability to revert into hair and choosing to believe that he is real proves that his is the Monkey King's son rather than his clone. With his newfound confidence, the Monkey Prince confronts and defeats King Fire Bull, who is resealed by Pigsy. As Supergirl thanks the Monkey Prince and his companions, the demoness flees unnoticed.

==== Characters introduced ====
The event introduced many new characters to the DC Universe. These include:

- Ash
- Bloodwynd (Raphael Arce)
- Circuit Breaker
- City Boy
- Deadeye
- Insomnia
- Psylosimon
- Trilogy
- The Vigil
- Xanthe Zhou

== Titles involved ==
=== Prelude ===
Title	Issues	Writer	Artist(s)	Colorist	Debut date	Conclusion date
Batman/Superman: World's Finest	#1–5	Mark Waid	Dan Mora	Tamra Bonvillain	March 15, 2022	July 19, 2022
Batman vs. Robin	#1–4	Mark Waid	Mahmud Asrar; Scott Godlewski	Jordie Bellaire	September 13, 2022	December 20, 2022
Monkey Prince	#10	Gene Luen Yang	Bernard Chang	Marcelo Maiolo	January 17, 2023	

=== Main story ===
Title	Issues	Writer(s)	Artist(s)	Colorist(s)	Release date
Lazarus Planet: Alpha	#1	Mark Waid; Gene Luen Yang	Riccardo Federici; Billy Tan	Brad Anderson; Sebastian Cheng	January 10, 2023
Lazarus Planet: Assault on Krypton	#1	Nicole Maines; C. S. Pacat; Frank Barberi; Leah Williams	Skylar Patridge; Scott Goldewski; Sami Basri; Vicente Cifuentes; Marguerite Sauvage	Nick Filardi; Alex Guimarães; Hi-Fi; Marguerite Sauvage	January 17, 2023
Lazarus Planet: We Once Were Gods	#1	Francis Manapul; Dan Watters; Phillip Kennedy Johnson; Josie Campbell	Francis Manapul; Max Dunbar; Jackson Herbert; Caitlin Yarsky	Romulo Fajardo Jr. Alex Guimarães; Jordie Bellaire	January 24, 2023
Lazarus Planet: Legends Reborn	#1	Alex Segura; Alex Paknadel; Greg Pak; Dennis Culver	Clayton Henry; Christopher Mitten; Minkyu Jung; Jesús Merino	Marcelo Maiolo; Romulo Fajardo Jr. Sunny Gho; Jesús Merino	January 31, 2023
Lazarus Planet: Next Evolution	#1	Ram V Brandon T. Snider; Chuck Brown; Delilah S. Dawson	Lalit Kumar Sharma; Laura Braga; Alitha Martinez; Ted Brandt	Romulo Fajardo Jr. Matt Herms; Alex Guimarães; Ro Stein	February 7, 2023
Lazarus Planet: Dark Fate	#1	Tim Seeley; Dennis Culver; Alyssa Wong; A.L. Kaplan	A.L. Kaplan; Ivan Plascencia; Baldemar Rivas; Chris Burnham Haining	Sebastian Cheng; Nick Filardi	February 14, 2023
Lazarus Planet: Omega	#1	Mark Waid; Gene Luen Yang	Billy Tan; Riccardo Federici	TBA	February 21, 2023

=== Tie-in issues ===
Title	Issue	Writer	Artist	Colorist	Release date
Monkey Prince	#11	Gene Luen Yang	Bernard Chang	Marcelo Maiolo	February 7, 2023

=== Revenge of the Gods ===
Title	Issue	Writer(s)	Artist	Colorist	Debut date	Conclusion date
Lazarus Planet: Revenge of the Gods	#1–4	G. Willow Wilson	Cian Tormey	TBA	March 14, 2023	April 18, 2023
Wonder Woman	#797–798	Becky Cloonan; Michael W. Conrad; Josie Campbell	Amancay Nahuelpan; Caitlin Yarsky	TBA	March 21, 2023	April 11, 2023

=== Aftermath ===
Title	Issue	Writer	Artist	Colorist	Release date
Batman vs. Robin	#5	Mark Waid	Mahmud Asrar	Jordie Bellaire	February 28, 2023
Monkey Prince	#12	Gene Luen Yang	Bernard Chang	Marcelo Maiolo	March 7, 2023

== Critical reception ==
According to Comicbookroundup, Lazarus Planet Alpha received an average rating of 7.9 out of 10 based on 13 reviews. Lazarus Planet: Assault on Krypton received an average rating of 8.1 out of 10 based on 7 reviews. Lazarus Planet: We Once Were Gods received an average rating of 7.7 out of 10 based on 9 reviews. Lazarus Planet: Legends Reborn received an average rating of 7 out of 10 based on 10 reviews. Lazarus Planet: Next Evolution received an average rating of 7.7 out of 10 based on 7 reviews. Monkey Prince #11 received an average rating of 8.4 out of 10 based on 5 reviews. Lazarus Planet Dark Fate received an average rating of 7.5 out of 10 based on 8 reviews. Lazarus Planet Omega received an average rating of 7.3 out of 10 based on 9 reviews.
