= Gigantic =

Gigantic may refer to:

- Gigantic, of very large size
- Gigantic (2008 film), an independent comedy film starring Paul Dano, Zooey Deschanel, and John Goodman
- Gigantic (cancelled film), an unproduced Disney film attempted in the mid-to-late 2010s
- "Gigantic" (song), a song by Pixies, released in 1998
- Gigantic (magazine), an American literary magazine published since 2009
- Gigantic (video game), a free-to-play video game developed by Motiga and released in 2017
- Gigantic, an English band made up of members formerly of Flesh for Lulu best known for their single "Disenchanted"
- Gigantic (TV series), a TV series on TeenNick from 2010 to 2011
- Gigantic (A Tale of Two Johns), a 2002 documentary film about the band They Might Be Giants
- Gigantism, a condition characterized by excessive growth and height significantly above average
- HMHS Britannic, a ship originally named "RMS Gigantic", operated from 1915 to 1916

== See also ==
- Giant (disambiguation)
