= Bloodwynd =

- Bloodwynd as depicted in Showcase '94 #5 (May 1994); art by Max Douglas.

Publication information
- Publisher: DC Comics
- First appearance: Justice League America #61 (April 1992)
- Created by: Dan Jurgens (writer & artist)

In-story information
- Alter ego: Quintus Arce
- Species: Human
- Team affiliations: Justice League; Justice League International; Sentinels of Magic; The Conclave
- Abilities: Mystic blood gem grants various magical abilities.

Bloodwynd is the name of several superheroes appearing in American comic books published by DC Comics. The original version of the character initially debuted in Justice League America #61 (April 1992), created by Dan Jurgens. In more recent publications, the character is revealed to have been three individuals and the original was given a alter-ego alongside a more streamlined origin.

The original incarnation is Quintus Arce, a necromancer and descendant of African American slaves that sought retribution against their slave owner by invoking a dark ritual involving a blood sacrifice, creating a blood gem that facilitated their freedom. Following being entrapped in his own blood gem and impersonated by Martian Manhunter in a complex plot for the slave owners', the character becomes a member of the Justice League America for a time until he voluntarily placed himself in reserve status and is eventually condemned to hell after an encounter with Felix Faust. He succeeded by his nephew, an empath whose abilities was awakened by the Lazarus rain during Lazarus Planet. He later absorbs portions of Doomsday and Martian Manhunter's souls, giving him several unique eldritch abilities.

== Fictional character biographies ==
Bloodwynd is the descendant of a group of African-American slaves owned by a brutal, sadistic planter named Jacob Whitney. These slaves performed an ancient ritual to create a mystical Blood Gem, with which they killed Whitney. The Blood Gem was passed down among the slaves' descendants. The Gem bestowed great physical powers on its wearer; unbeknownst to them, it also contained a microscopic world, where Jacob Whitney's spirit had become incarnate as the demon Rott. Over the years, Rott grew stronger as the Gem absorbed the dark side of each wearer's soul.

Rott sucked Bloodwynd into the Gem and held him captive, while mind controlling Martian Manhunter, compelling him to wear the Gem and impersonate Bloodwynd. Using Bloodwynd's identity, Martian Manhunter rejoined the Justice League, seeking a power source which would enable Rott to escape from his micro-world. While the JLA fought Doomsday alongside Superman, Blue Beetle realizes that Bloodwynd is Martian Manhunter after he is incapacitated by fire. Once the truth is exposed, the Justice League battles Rott and frees the real Bloodwynd.

=== Post-Flashpoint ===
In the revised continuity, Bloodwynd's history closely mirrors his pre-Flashpoint incarnation. In DC Power 2024, it is revealed that Quintus becomes the superhero Bloodwynd after inheriting the bloodgem. Following a confrontation with Felix Faust, Bloodwynd is condemned to Hell, where he relives his past failures. Saved by his nephew Raphael, Bloodwynd learns that holding the bloodgem upon death leads to damnation. Raphael takes on the mantle, freeing Bloodwynd from Hell. Before vanishing, Bloodwynd urges his nephew to carry the legacy responsibly.

== Powers and abilities ==
Quintus is a proficient necromancer, adept at summoning and utilizing the life energy and enhanced power of deceased spirits. He also possesses the ability to sense death locations and can impose the torment of victims upon murderers, similar to Ghost Rider's "Penance Stare". He is notably equipped with a blood gem, a potent arcane object that bestows a range of magical abilities, including flight, enhanced strength, telepathy, and the ability to cast illusions.

== Other versions ==
- Martian Manhunter briefly appropriated the identity due to subtle mental coercion from the entity within the blood gem ("Rott") while Quintus foiled Rott's attempt to escape, a gambit enacted by Rott to find a power source able to allow his freedom but was defeated and the real Quintus was freed.
- In 2023, a new incarnation of the character appeared; In Lazarus Planet, Raphael Arce, a native of Metropolis affected by the Lazarus rains. This iteration is a metahuman with empathic abilities and the ability to heal emotional and physical pain. He encounters a living memory of Doomsday and traps him in a psychic blood gem with the help of Martian Manhunter.

== Reception ==
Bloodwynd has had mixed reception; while praised for his design and being one of the few black characters of mystical origin, criticisms noted both the character's name and roles in storylines has caused the character to be "underdeveloped" and fade into obscurity.

== In other media ==
Bloodwynd appears as a character summon in Scribblenauts Unmasked: A DC Comics Adventure.
