= Aryan Brigade =

Group of comic book supervillians

- Cover art for Justice League Task Force #10. From left to right: Heatmonger, Blind Faith, Iron Cross, Golden Eagle, and Backlash; art by Sal Velluto.

Publication information
- Publisher: DC Comics
- First appearance: Justice League Task Force #10 (March 1994)
- Created by: Michael Jan Friedman

In-story information
- Base(s): Mobile
- Member(s): Iron Cross; Heatmonger; Golden Eagle; Blind Faith; Backlash

The Aryan Brigade is a group of supervillains in DC Comics. They were also known as the Purifiers of the Aryan Nation. The first version of the Aryan Brigade first appeared in Justice League Task Force #10 (March 1994) and were created by Michael Jan Friedman.

== Members ==
=== First group ===
The members of the first Aryan Brigade are:

- Backlash - Possesses elastic whip-like arms.
- Blind Faith - A blind female villain who operates as a seer.
- Golden Eagle - A supervillain who uses an exo-skeleton and artificial wings.
- Heatmonger (sometimes stylized as Heat Monger) - A female supervillain with robotic arms that shoot blasts of thermal energy.
- Iron Cross - A supervillain with super-strength.

=== Second group ===
The members of the second Aryan Brigade are:

- Backlash - A supervillain who has elastic whip-like arms.
- Bonehead - A bulletproof man with spikes protruding from his skull.
- Luftwaffe - A powerful metahuman who sports World War II-era pilot attire.
- Rebel - A super-strong white supremacist.

== Fictional character biography ==
=== First Aryan Brigade ===
The Aryan Nation is a white supremacist terrorist organization which created a designer virus that would attack and destroy "non-white" DNA in humans. They are secretly led by U.S. Senator Sanders Hotchkins. When several noted chemists disappear, the FBI contacts Hannibal Martin, the Justice League Task Force's liaison. In response, Martian Manhunter assembles a covert team to infiltrate the terrorists. While undercover, Hourman draws attention after being forced to use his powers and is attacked by the Aryan Nation's enforcers: the Aryan Brigade. With the aid of Blind Faith's mental powers, the Aryan Brigade ambushes the Task Force. The Aryan Brigade intends to distribute their virus throughout Earth's atmosphere, but is thwarted by Martian Manhunter who forces the rocket to detonate.

The Aryan Brigade's members are recruited by the Overmaster to be part of his new Cadre. Golden Eagle and Heatmonger go on to join the Suicide Squad.

Heatmonger and Iron Cross are among the villains transported to another world in Salvation Run. While stranded on the planet, Iron Cross is killed by the Joker. Heatmonger is used by Lex Luthor as a power source for a teleportation device, and is seemingly killed when it self-destructs.

=== Second Aryan Brigade ===
A new version of the Aryan Brigade appears and is composed of Backlash and new members Rebel, Bonehead and Luftwaffe. They attack a casino in Las Vegas, but are swiftly defeated by the Freedom Fighters.

== In other media ==
- In David S. Goyer's unproduced film script Escape from Super Max, Iron Cross, Heatmonger and Backlash were reportedly featured as inmates of the titular prison.
- An original incarnation of Heat Monger, Lucious Coolidge, appears in The Flash episode "Cause and Effect", portrayed by Richard Zeman. This version is a criminal and arsonist from Central City.
