= Beefeater (character) =

The Beefeater
- The Beefeater, from Justice League Europe #20, artist Marshall Rogers.

Publication information
- Publisher: DC Comics
- First appearance: As Michael Morice: Justice League International Annual #3 (July 1989); As Beefeater: Justice League Europe #20 (November 1990)
- Created by: Keith Giffen (writer); Gerard Jones (writer); Marshall Rogers (artist)

In-story information
- Alter ego: Michael Morice
- Team affiliations: Her Majesty's Prison Service; Justice League; Justice League International
- Abilities: Power Rod

Beefeater (Michael Morice) is a superhero appearing in American comic books published by DC Comics. He appeared in his civilian identity as Michael Morice in Justice League International Annual #3 (1989), and debuted as Beefeater in Justice League Europe #20 (November 1990) in a story by Keith Giffen, Gerard Jones and Marshall Rogers. His codename and appearance are taken from the uniform of the Yeomen Warders.

Beefeater is similar to Basil Fawlty, a character in the British television sitcom Fawlty Towers. He is Britain's hero using a power-rod used by his father (the first Beefeater, who operated during World War II) to try to protect Britain, but instead causes havoc as he goes.

== Fictional character biography ==
Michael Morice is a staff member at the Justice League's embassy in London. Supporting him is his wife and Esteban, the latter of whom has a poor grasp of English. After finding the costume and power-rod of his father, the first Beefeater, in his attic, Michael decides to join the Justice League. The embassy's security system views him as a threat and attacks him, leading to the embassy being destroyed.

Beefeater appears in 52 as a pallbearer for Booster Gold's coffin following his supposed death. He is briefly seen as one of dozens of heroes kidnapped by the Auctioneer who are later freed.

Beefeater returns in Batman and Robin as the Queen's Jailer, the warden of a detention facility.

In the 2023 miniseries Fire & Ice: Welcome to Smallville, Beefeater is employed at Fire and Ice's hair salon, The Big Tease, in Smallville. However, he is killed by his coworker Lot's Wife, who was made cannibalistic by the monster Crave. Beefeater appears as a spirit in the 2024 miniseries Fire & Ice: When Hell Freezes Over, where he encounters Fire and Ice in Hell.
