= Maxwell Lord =

DC Comics supervillain

- Maxwell Lord as depicted in Countdown to Infinite Crisis #1 (March 2005). Art by Phil Jimenez.

Publication information
- Publisher: DC Comics
- First appearance: Justice League #1 (May 1987)
- Created by: Keith Giffen; J. M. DeMatteis; Kevin Maguire

In-story information
- Alter ego: Maxwell "Max" Lord IV
- Species: Metahuman
- Team affiliations: Checkmate; Extremists; Justice League; Black Lantern Corps; Justice League International; Project Cadmus
- Notable aliases: Black King, Lord Havok
- Abilities: Telepathic persuasion

Maxwell Lord IV is a supporting character, later becoming a supervillain, appearing in American comic books published by DC Comics. The character first appeared in Justice League #1 (May 1987) and was created by Keith Giffen, J. M. DeMatteis, and Kevin Maguire. Maxwell Lord was originally introduced as a notable businessman who was an ally of the Justice League and was influential in the formation of the Justice League International, but he later developed into an adversary of Wonder Woman and the Justice League.

The character made his cinematic debut in the 2020 DC Extended Universe film, Wonder Woman 1984, portrayed by Pedro Pascal. The character was also portrayed by Sean Gunn in the DC Universe (DCU) film Superman and the second season of the television series Peacemaker (both 2025).

== Fictional character biography ==
Maxwell Lord IV is the son of Maxwell Lord III, a successful businessman and head of the Chimtech Consortium. Maxwell III set out to be a good example for his son by striving to always do what was right. When Maxwell IV was 16, he came home to find his father dead in an apparent suicide. His father had discovered that his company had produced a carcinogenic product, and could not bear the guilt.

Lord's mother was convinced by her husband to employ a similar practice, cajoling heroic metahumans to help Lord. Thus, he sparked the plans to bring the Justice League, fractured after the Crisis on Infinite Earths event, under his exclusive control.

=== Giffen and DeMatteis years ===
Lord initially worked behind the scenes to establish the Justice League, while under the control of a computer created by Metron. The computer wanted Lord to set up a worldwide peacekeeping organization as part of its plan to dominate the world.

Lord talks with the Martian Manhunter on the need for a strong League in Justice League America #40 (July 1990). Art by Adam Hughes and J. M. DeMatteis.

A retcon changed Lord's controller to the villainous computer program Kilg%re, which had taken over Metron's machine. A second retcon mitigated Kilg%re's and Metron's influence, stating that Lord already had plans to take over the League and would have pursued them regardless.

Lord's ruthlessness at this time was illustrated when he set up a disturbed would-be terrorist as a villain for the League to defeat, resulting in the man's death. Later, Lord rebelled against the computer's influence and destroyed it.

Once free of the computer's influence, Lord is portrayed as an amoral businessman, but not a real villain. During the time that Giffen and DeMatteis were writing the Justice League, Lord is shown struggling with his conscience and developing heroic qualities, though he would remain a con-artist.

=== From Invasion! to Identity Crisis ===
Originally a normal human, Lord is one of many people on Earth who gain superpowers during the Invasion crossover, when the Dominators activate their Gene Bomb. This bomb activates Lord's latent metagene, granting him the ability to control the minds of others, albeit at great difficulty. Despite being a metahuman, Lord never identifies as one. Instead, at the urging of his mother to act for the benefit of non-metahumans, he shifts his hatred for the generic "authority figures" who caused his father's death to the metahuman community.

After he is shot and placed in a coma at the beginning of JLAmerica/JLEurope crossover Breakdowns, Dreamslayer takes over Lord's body and supercharges Lord's power, allowing him to control thousands of minds at once. Using Lord's body, Dreamslayer almost forces Justice League International (JLI) to disband. While possessed Lord forces the JLI to battle itself, the mortally wounded Silver Sorceress contains Dreamslayer and holds him within her mind as she dies, taking him with her. When Lord is freed, his power is burnt out.

Lord reflects on his time with the League in Justice League America #60 (March 1992). Art by Kevin Maguire and J. M. DeMatteis.

Later, Lord is diagnosed with a brain tumor and dies. Kilg%re downloads Lord's consciousness into a duplicate of one of Dreamslayer's allies, Lord Havok. Lord's body later shifts to resemble his original human form.

Doomsday later crash-lands on Earth, easily trounces the League, and kills Superman. With Earth undefended, Mongul invades and destroys Coast City, killing Lord's mother. This event further fuels his hatred and paranoia against metahumans, as well as leading him to believe that not only can metahumans not be trusted, but that their personal battles and scuffles are enough to shatter world safety.

Lord puts together several former JLI members, including L-Ron, Captain Atom, Blue Beetle (Ted Kord), Booster Gold, and Fire as the Super Buddies, advertised as "heroes the common man could call". The Super Buddies star in the 2003 miniseries Formerly Known as the Justice League and its 2005 sequel I Can't Believe It's Not the Justice League.

In Identity Crisis (2004), Lord attends Sue Dibny's funeral and speaks to Booster Gold, further denting his already dwindling faith in superheroes.

=== Infinite Crisis ===
Lord kills Ted Kord in DC Countdown #1 (May 2005); art by Phil Jimenez.

Countdown to Infinite Crisis reveals that Lord is no longer a cyborg, and is a criminal mastermind who spent years running the JLI while gathering sensitive information about the world's superheroes, whom he considered a threat to the planet. Simultaneously, he sabotaged JLI efforts to render the superhero team as ineffectual as possible. At the end of the prologue special issue, he shoots and kills Ted Kord.

Alexander Luthor Jr., the son of Lex Luthor from an alternate Earth, gives Lord control of Brother Eye, a satellite system Batman created to monitor superhumans worldwide. Lord uses his powers to influence Superman's mind, causing him to brutally beat Batman in the belief that he is Brainiac. Lord subsequently sends Superman to attack Wonder Woman after making him believe that she is his old enemy Doomsday. Lord justifies the resulting destruction as proof of his argument about the dangers of superhumans, pointing out the devastation that Wonder Woman and Superman could cause if they fought in a crowded area, and arguing that the fact that Superman can be brought under another's control is evidence that superhumans cannot be relied upon. In the midst of her battle with Superman, Diana realizes that even if she defeats him, he would still remain under Lord's control. She creates a diversion lasting long enough for her to race back to Lord's location and asks that he release Superman. Lord, bound by her lasso of truth, complies but states that he'll use Superman again to kill people. When she demands to know how to free Superman from Lord's control, Lord replies "Kill me." Wonder Woman then snaps his neck.

Wonder Woman seemingly kills Lord in Infinite Crisis #1 (Dec, 2005); art by Phil Jimenez.

At the "Crisis Counseling" panel at Wizard World Chicago, Dan DiDio explained DC's reasoning in using Lord's character in Infinite Crisis. After going through several possible characters who could be the "new leader for the offshoot of Checkmate", Maxwell Lord was suggested. Many of the editors thought that the idea made sense, as Lord had been shown to have a mean streak and to have killed previously. The idea was dropped due to the continuity errors, such as him being a cyborg, but they went back to it later after deciding none of the other possible characters were suitable. DiDio explained: "We thought about that aspect of the story [where Maxwell was turned into a cyborg] some more. And then asked, 'Did anyone read it?' No. 'Did anyone like the idea?' No. So we moved ahead with Max as being a human, and having been a human, and not letting that small part of the past stand in the way of this story. We wanted what was best for Countdown [to Infinite Crisis], and for us, that meant that Max had to be a human".

=== Resurrection ===
In Blackest Night and Brightest Day, Maxwell Lord is resurrected as a Black Lantern. Targeting Wonder Woman, he lures her to Arlington National Cemetery with a trail of corpses. When Wonder Woman arrives, he springs a trap, using black rings to revive the bodies of fallen soldiers. Wonder Woman uses her lasso to reduce Lord and the soldiers to dust, but as she leaves, the dust begins to regenerate. Some time later, Lord resumes his attack on Wonder Woman, who had recently become a Star Sapphire. Wonder Woman encases Lord's body in crystal, then shatters him to pieces. He is later brought back to life by the power of the White Light. Though Guy Gardner attempts to restrain him, Lord uses his mind control abilities to make Gardner let him leave.

In the series Justice League: Generation Lost, Lord is the subject of an unprecedented international manhunt. He is found hiding in the old Justice League International embassy by Booster Gold, whom Lord is able to defeat. Lord then uses a device to amplify his mind control powers to unprecedented levels. With these, he erases the world's memory of his existence.

Lord is later contacted by the Life Entity, who tasks him with killing Magog. Lord uses his powers to force Magog to kill himself, framing Captain Atom for Magog's death. The Entity proclaims that Lord has completed his task, and his life is fully restored.

=== DC Rebirth ===
In 2016, DC Comics implemented another relaunch of its books called "DC Rebirth" which restored its continuity to a form much as it was prior to "The New 52". Lord is depicted as the leader of Project Cadmus. With the aid of Killer Frost, Lord acquires the Heart of Darkness from a vault, using it to enhance his powers to take control of the Justice League. Lord uses the infected Justice League to achieve "peace" across America, and has Amanda Waller kidnapped and taken before him. Waller forces Lord to recognize that the Heart is manipulating his perceptions, using Lord's powers to spread chaos and evil across the world, and twisting Lord's perception of what is transpiring. When Waller is able to bring him to his senses, Lord tries to remove the Heart of Darkness, but it consumes him and transforms him into Eclipso.

Eclipso is driven out of Lord when Killer Frost is able to use her powers to create a prism of ice, channeling Superman's heat vision at just the right frequency to disrupt Lord's mental control, with Lord subsequently being immobilized by Killer Frost. Lord awakens in a cell specially designed to hold him, with injectors pumping so much blood thinner into him that he would bleed to death if he attempted to access his powers. He mockingly asks Waller if she set this whole thing up just to 'justify' the Squad to the League, but Waller declines to reply, and simply informs him that he is to prepare himself for service in "Task Force XI".

== Powers and abilities ==
Maxwell Lord is a metahuman with the ability to telepathically influence people's minds, typically in the form of pushing a subconscious suggestion to others. Using his power causes Lord's nose to bleed, and requires great mental strain. Over time, Lord's powers grew to the point where he could take full control of other beings, even Superman, although it required a great deal of time and patience for him to establish control over Superman. In his original depiction, Lord was born a human and had his metagene activated by the Dominators' Gene Bomb, but he is later depicted as having been born a metahuman.

== Other versions ==
=== Amalgam Comics ===
Maxwell Hodge, a fusion of Maxwell Lord and Marvel Comics character Cameron Hodge, appears in the Amalgam Comics universe.

=== Justice Riders ===
An alternate universe version of Maxwell Lord appears in Justice Riders. This version is a 19th-century railroad baron.

=== Wonder Woman: Earth One ===
An alternate universe version of Maxwell Lord appears in Wonder Woman: Earth One as a disguise used by Ares.

== In other media ==
=== Television ===
- Maxwell Lord appears in the Justice League Unlimited episode "Ultimatum", voiced by Tim Matheson. This version is a member of Project Cadmus and manager of the Ultimen, a team of genetically-engineered superheroes who operate independently of the Justice League.
- Maxwell Lord appears in the ninth season of Smallville, portrayed by Gil Bellows. This version is the Black King of Checkmate.
- Maxwell Lord appears in the first season of Supergirl, portrayed by Peter Facinelli. This version is the founder of Lord Technologies who possesses a god complex and is the son of scientists who were killed due to unsafe conditions, making him distrustful of government agencies. Seeking to expose Supergirl's identity, he uses her DNA to turn a comatose girl into a Bizarro version of her to frame and kill the real one. However, Supergirl and Alex Danvers defeat the clone while Lord is arrested by the Department of Extranormal Operations (DEO), though he is later released in return for his help in freeing Supergirl from the Black Mercy's effects.
- Maxwell Lord appears in the DC Super Hero Girls episode "#WorldsFinest", voiced by P. J. Byrne. This version is a public relations specialist.

=== Film ===
- Maxwell Lord was meant to appear in Justice League: Mortal, portrayed by Jay Baruchel. This version, named Jonah Wilkes, was abducted as a child and given psychic abilities by the US government as part of the OMAC Project.
- Maxwell "Max" Lord (né Lorenzano) appears in the DC Extended Universe (DCEU) film Wonder Woman 1984, portrayed by Pedro Pascal as an adult, Lambro Demetriou as a child, and John Barry as a teenager. This version grew up poor and was abused by his father, Alberto Lorenzano. He was picked on by bullies and bootstrapped himself on the idea of image and publicized promises. By 1984, he became an aspiring businessman, the owner of the company Black Gold, and father to a son named Alistair (portrayed by Lucian Perez). While seeking out the Dreamstone, an artifact created by the Duke of Deception that grants users one wish while extracting a heavy toll unless they renounce their wish or destroy the stone, he manipulates Barbara Ann Minerva into helping him acquire it and grants himself the stone's powers to save his failing company and grant others' wishes in exchange for whatever he desires. Over time, he rapidly rises to power and becomes an influential figure while unknowingly causing international chaos and self-inflicted mental and physical distress. After learning of and utilizing a satellite system to grant wishes around the world and restore his health, he is confronted by Wonder Woman, who eventually convinces him to renounce his original wish. Lord comes to terms with his flaws and reunites with Alistair, promising to be a better father to him.

=== DC Universe ===
Maxwell Lord appears in the DC Universe (DCU), portrayed by Sean Gunn. This version is the CEO of LordTech and sponsor of the Justice Gang. According to DCU co-creator James Gunn, Lord is based on the "morally grey" depiction from his early comic appearances, but is not outright villainous like in later depictions.

- Lord makes a cameo appearance in Superman.
- Lord appears in the Peacemaker episode "The Ties That Grind".

=== Video games ===
Maxwell Lord appears as a character summon in Scribblenauts Unmasked: A DC Comics Adventure.
