= Cadre (comics) =

DC Comics supervillain group

The Cadre
- The Cadre in Justice League of America #235-236, artist Chuck Patton.

Publication information
- Publisher: DC Comics
- First appearance: Justice League of America #235 (February 1985)
- Created by: Gerry Conway (writer); Chuck Patton (artist)

In-story information
- Member(s): Starshrike; Shrike; Shatterfist; Black Mass; Crowbar; Nightfall; Overmaster; Ice; Doctor Polaris; Fastball; Devastator; Prester John; Ewald Olaffson; Mahayogi; Maya; Druid; Osiris; Mohammed Ibn Bornu; Musashi; Phalanx; Seneca; Xiuhtecutli

The Cadre is a DC Comics supervillain group, except for members of the Cadre of the Immortal, most of whom were redeemed and became heroes by story's end.

== Publication history ==
The Cadre first appeared in Justice League of America #235 (February 1985) and were created by Gerry Conway and Chuck Patton.

== Fictional team history ==
=== Overmaster's Cadre ===
A cosmic alien villain known as the Overmaster began to test humanity's fitness to inhabit Earth. He summoned a group of villains to him and gave them superpowers, and the villains became the Cadre. The Cadre has fought the Justice League on different occasions and has been through many incarnations of their group. Several members have died and new ones were recruited.

The original Justice League defeated the Cadre, after which the Overmaster vanished. Years later, he returned, acting through heralds such as the Aryan Brigade, the New Extremists, and the Cadre of the Immortal.

=== Cadre of the Immortal ===
There was also another version of the Cadre called the Cadre of the Immortal; this version was made up of international metahumans deluded by an agent of the Overmaster that claimed to be Prester John, the Immortal. He then announced his intention to destroy the Earth in one week, erasing Central City from the planet and stopping all deaths and births across the globe as proof of his power. The Justice League invaded the Overmaster's spacecraft and used its technology to reverse all effects of the Overmaster's activities. The Mahayogi was killed while freeing JLI member Maya from mind control. After the truth was revealed Seneca and Osiris joined the JLI in their battle against the Overmaster, but have not been seen in the DCU since.

Overmaster was accidentally killed by Will Everett III, the second Amazing Man, after the Justice League member Ice had been killed by the villain. Following this event, the League moved into the Refuge, Overmaster's space station, making it their new headquarters.

=== Second Cadre ===
Another version of the Cadre was formed with various members of minor DC villain groups such as the Extremists.

=== Third Cadre ===
Another version of the Cadre, led by Doctor Polaris, was later formed and fought the Power Company.

== Membership ==
There were different incarnations of the Cadre. They are:

=== Members of Overmaster's Cadre ===
- Overmaster - A 580 million year-old alien. He was accidentally slain by Amazing Man.
- Black Mass - A former M.I.T. physicist with gravity control powers.
- Shatterfist - A Korean martial artist whose fists could shatter anything. He was killed by Ice.
- Crowbar - A former Detroit gang leader with a metaphysical crowbar.
- Fastball - Used a robotic suit that allowed him to throw baseball-sized explosives with great force. He was killed by an OMAC.
- Nightfall - Wields wristbands that can create null-fields and absorb light and energy.
- Shrike - A mental patient with a sonic scream and wings. Shrike died on a mission with the Suicide Squad.

=== Members of the Cadre of the Immortal ===
Cadre of the Immortal, artist Chuck Wojtkiewicz.

- Prester John a.k.a. the Immortal, he wanted to rid the world of modern technology, but was killed by the Overmaster for failing to defeat the JLI.
- Ewald Olaffson - Ice's brother and servant of the Overmaster.
- Maya - A former JLA member from India.
- Mahayogi - A Hindu wraith and servant of the god Shiva, who gave Maya her powers.
- Druid - An English villain, died at end of story.
- Phalanx - An Italian hero wearing Roman armor who could create duplicates of himself.
- Mohammed Ibn Bornu - A North African hero with an electric spear that fired bolts of lightning, and owns a flying robot horse.
- Musashi - A super powered Japanese warrior hero.
- Seneca - A super-strong Native American hero.
- Xiuhtecutli - An Aztec-styled Mexican warrior woman with solar powers.
- Osiris - An Egyptian hero wearing golden armor, believing himself to be the reincarnation of Osiris.

=== Members of the Second Cadre ===
- Ice - Deluded by the Overmaster and eventually killed.
- Devastator - Wields armor and a powerful trident; critically injured Booster Gold.
- The New Extremists
- Aryan Brigade

=== Members of the Third Cadre ===
- Doctor Polaris - Possesses magnetic powers, healed Black Mass and reformed the team.
- Starshrike - Resembles the original version with similar powers and wings.
- Shatterfist
- Black Mass
- Crowbar
- Fastball

== In other media ==
- The Cadre appear in Justice League Unlimited, consisting of Shatterfist, Black Mass, Fastball, Nightfall, and Crowbar. Following their introduction in the episode "Clash", Shatterfist takes part in Roulette's Meta-Brawl in the episode "Grudge Match" while the other members join Gorilla Grodd's Secret Society in the third season.
- The Cadre make cameo appearances in the Harley Quinn tie-in comic Harley Quinn: The Animated Series: The Eat. Bang! Kill Tour, consisting of Nightfall, Black Mass, Fastball, Shatterfist, and Maya. Throughout their appearances, Nightfall is revealed to be in a relationship with Livewire.
