= Lord Havok =

- Lord Havok as depicted in Lord Havok and the Extremists #3 (February 2008). Art by Mark Robinson.

Publication information
- Publisher: DC Comics
- First appearance: Justice League Europe #15 (June 1990)
- Created by: Gerard Jones, Keith Giffen (script)

In-story information
- Full name: Alexi Nikolai
- Place of origin: Angor
- Team affiliations: Extremists
- Abilities: Genius intelligence Superhuman abilities derived from powered armor

Lord Havok is a fictional character, a DC Comics supervillain, part of the supervillain team called the Extremists. Like the other Extremists, he is a pastiche of a Marvel Comics character, specifically Doctor Doom. He is a genius equipped with a powered armor. Lord Havok first appeared in Justice League Europe #15 (June 1990).

== Fictional character biography ==
As told in a flashback in Justice League Quarterly #3 (Summer 1991), the man who would become Lord Havok was originally one of five terrorists on Angor, an Earth-like world in a parallel universe. The terrorists captured an experimental nuclear weapon and threatened to use it against the Justifiers, the primary superhero team on Angor. When the device exploded, the five terrorists were turned into the superpowered Extremists. Havok and the Extremists launched Angor's nuclear arsenal, starting a nuclear holocaust that killed all life on Angor except for Dreamslayer, who escaped into another dimension.

In Justice League Europe #15, Havok and the Extremists travel to the main universe and attempt to take over Earth. In Justice League Europe #18, he and his fellow villains are revealed to be robot duplicates created by theme park owner Mitch Wacky. The Justice League bring Wacky to their Earth, where he quickly deactivates the robots.

Havok returns thanks to the manipulations of Dreamslayer and the enslavement of Mitch Wacky (who is killed for his troubles). Despite another defeat by the Justice League, Havok and now his other soldiers would return one more time, only to be stopped by Power Girl and the Linda Danvers-Supergirl.

=== Earth-8 ===
Following Infinite Crisis and 52, another universe's Lord Havok and the Extremists are located on Earth-8, now under virtual global control by the United States of Angor, apart from an ominous "Russian wasteland", known as Slovekia, in which the Extremists reside. In Countdown #29, they capture Jason Todd, Donna Troy, Kyle Rayner, and "Bob" the Monitor, but are distracted by the arrival of Bob's brother, who attempts to kill the captives. Not long after, the Extremists are offered membership in Monarch's army. Though Havok refuses at first, he later agrees, and becomes Monarch's second-in-command. The Extremists are featured in a miniseries which ties in with Countdown to Final Crisis. In #1, the origin of Havok and the new Extremists is revealed; they were superbeings refusing to submit to the Metahuman Act, a government mandate requiring all metahumans to submit to government control. After Havok's refusal, Monarch begins destroying places of great importance to the Extremists, which Havok dismisses as "acceptable losses", much to the chagrin of the Extremists.

In #6, it is revealed that Havok was originally Alexi Nikolai, the son of the czar of Russia, who was born disfigured and almost killed before his mother sent him away to escape the czar's wrath. As he grew, Nikolai developed a talent for designing machines and androids and created a malleable, mentally controlled metallic skin. After his mother kills his father, Nikolai kills him in revenge and intends to destroy Russia.

As the Meta-Militia and Monarch's forces attack the Extremists' headquarters, Havok reveals his trap: he has purposefully let the attacking metahumans into the base to lure them into a power-nullifying chamber. After decimating all but Monarch and Americommando (who is apprehended by Bluejay, who rebelled against the Meta-Militia), Havok agreed to join Monarch's forces.

In Countdown to Final Crisis #17, the Extremists are involved in Monarch's attack on Earth-51. In #13, Monarch's armor is breached by Superman-Prime and the entire Universe 51 is annihilated, however LHAE #6 reveals that Havok siphoned part of Monarch's power, allowing him to teleport away the Extremists and himself to a new base of operations within Angor's moon before Earth-51 was destroyed. Havok then reveals his intent to conquer the different worlds of the Multiverse.

=== The Multiversity ===
During The Multiversity storyline, a new version of Lord Havok appears on Earth 8. He claims to be the "greatest creation" of Frank Future, a Mister Fantastic pastiche, seeking to gather together the Omni-Gauntlets, the Genesis Egg and the Lightning-Axe of Wundajin (a Thor pastiche). He is seemingly killed by Deadeye, a Hawkeye pastiche.

=== DC Rebirth ===
A new incarnation of Lord Havok and the Extremists appears in Saratoga and battles Batman's Justice League before retreating to the Eastern European nation of Kravia, where Havok was a prince before being passed over by his father. The Kravia of Earth is in turmoil due to a collapse of leadership, and Havok retakes the country by offering them strength through his leadership. When Batman and the JLA arrive to confront the Extremists, they are forced to leave by soldiers acting under orders from the Kravian government who have voted to accept Havok as ruler. The JLA then offer assistance to Kravian freedom fighters, and while Havok is intimidating neighbouring nations to bring them under his rule, the Justice League confronts the Extremists in the various Kravian cities they are terrorizing.

== Powers and abilities ==
Lord Havok wears a suit of cybernetic armor with built-in high-tech weapons. The armor gives him protection from physical and energy attacks, enhanced strength and endurance, can generate energy blasts and force fields, and has a built-in radar system to detect unseen threats and has targeting systems.

The Earth-8 version has an armor made liquid metal, able to react to his thoughts and morph into various forms. Apparently, he also learned how to use "backwards speech" to effect magic in this world.

The Rebirth Lord Havok's armor is resistant to control from Dr. Diehard and Havok refers to it as his 'skin'. He also wields the Lightning-Axe of Wundajin and the shield of Crusader.

== In other media ==
- Lord Havok makes a non-speaking cameo appearance in the Justice League Unlimited episode "Shadow of the Hawk".
- Lord Havok appears as a character summon in Scribblenauts Unmasked: A DC Comics Adventure.
