= Bliss =

Bliss may refer to:

== Arts and media ==
=== Literature ===
- Bliss (novel) (1981), by Peter Carey
- Bliss, a 2005 novel by Fiona Zedde
- Bliss, a 2005 novel by Danyel Smith
- "Bliss" (short story) (1920), by Katherine Mansfield; republished in:
  - Bliss and Other Stories (short story collection) (1920) by Katherine Mansfield

=== Fictional entities ===
- Bliss (Marvel Comics), member of the Marvel Comics mutant group The Morlocks
- Bliss (Starman), incubus who appeared in the DC Comics series Starman
- Bliss (The Powerpuff Girls), a character from the 2016 series The Powerpuff Girls
- Dee Bliss, fictional character on the Australian soap Neighbours
- Bliss Colby, fictional character of the American prime time soap opera The Colbys
- The Bliss, a telepathic ability in the 2009 series V
- Blissenobiarella, also known as Bliss, a character in Asimov's Foundation series
- Bliss, a fictional hallucinogenic drug in the 2018 video game Far Cry 5
- Dr. Bliss, a fictional female character in the Hey Arnold! episode, Helga on the Couch

=== Film ===
- Bliss (1917 film), starring Harold Lloyd
- Bliss (1985 film), directed by Ray Lawrence, adapted from the Peter Carey novel
- Bliss (1997 film), starring Terence Stamp, Sheryl Lee and Craig Sheffer
- Bliss (2006 film), a.k.a. Fu Sheng, Chinese film produced by Fruit Chan
- Bliss (2007 film), a.k.a. Mutluluk, directed by Abdullah Oğuz, adapted from the Zülfü Livaneli novel
- Bliss (2011 film), a biographical film about the early years of New Zealand author Katherine Mansfield
- Bliss (2017 film), a Philippine thriller
- Bliss (2019 film), a horror film written and directed by Joe Begos
- Bliss (2021 film), a science fiction film written and directed by Mike Cahill

=== Television channels ===
- Bliss (TV channel), a British music television channel playing classic hits
- TV 2 Bliss, a defunct Norwegian television channel

=== Television shows and episodes ===
- Bliss, a 1995 British television film written and directed by Les Blair
- Bliss (1995 TV series), British ITV series
- Bliss (2018 TV series), a 2018 British-American produced television series
- Bliss (Canadian TV series), a 2002 Canadian produced dramatic television series that ran from 2002 to 2004
- "Bliss" (Star Trek: Voyager), the 14th episode of the fifth season of Star Trek: Voyager
- "Bliss" (The Penguin), the third episode of The Penguin

=== Music ===
==== Bands ====
- Bliss (British band), an English pop group
- Bliss (Danish band), a Danish music band
- Jonathan Notley, a.k.a. MC Bliss, part of the Australian hip hop group Bliss n Eso

==== Albums ====
- Bliss (12 Rods album) (1993), album by indie rock band 12 Rods
- Bliss (Birdbrain album) (1995), the debut album by post-grunge band Birdbrain
- Bliss (Vanessa Paradis album) (2000), album by French pop singer Vanessa Paradis
- Bliss (Nikki Webster album) (2002), the second studio album by Nikki Webster
- Bliss (Tone Damli album) (2005), Norwegian singer Tone Damli's first studio album
- Bliss (Tech N9ne album) (2023), album by American rapper Tech N9ne
- Bliss (Doh Kyung-soo album) (2025), album by South Korean singer D.O.
- The Bliss Album...? (Vibrations of Love and Anger and the Ponderance of Life and Existence) (1993), an album by P.M. Dawn
- Bliss! (1973), by Chick Corea, originally called Turkish Women at the Bath

==== EPs ====
- Bliss (EP), 2015, by American rock band A Will Away
- Bliss, 2019, by Australian musician Kian

==== Songs ====
- "Bliss" (Th' Dudes song), a 1980 song by New Zealand rock band Th' Dudes
- "Bliss" (Tori Amos song), a 1999 song by Tori Amos
- "Bliss" (Muse song), a 2001 song by the English rock band Muse
- "Bliss" (Tyla song), 2025, by Tyla
- "Bliss", a song by Alice Peacock
- "Bliss", a song by Annihilator, from King of the Kill
- "Bliss", a song by Blaque from Blaque Out
- "Bliss", a song by Delirious? from Mezzamorphis
- "Bliss", a song by Mariah Carey, from Rainbow
- "Bliss", a song by Nelly Furtado on the vinyl version of The Ride
- "Bliss", a song by Paul Gilbert from Burning Organ
- "Bliss", a song by Phish, from Billy Breathes
- "Bliss", a song by Still Remains, from Of Love and Lunacy
- "Bliss (I Don't Wanna Know)", a song by Hinder from Extreme Behavior

=== Other uses in culture ===
- Bliss (magazine), a UK teen magazine
- Bliss (opera), 2010, based on Peter Carey's novel of the same name
- Bliss (video game), a 2005 adult computer game
- Bliss, a newspaper comic by Harry Bliss

== Brands and companies ==
- Bliss (charity), a special care baby charity
- Bliss (spa), a spa and retail product company
- Bliss, bite-sized chocolates manufactured by The Hershey Company
- Bliss, a type of synthetic cannabis

== Technology ==
- BLISS, system programming language developed at Carnegie Mellon University
- Bliss (photograph), computer wallpaper included with Microsoft Windows XP
- Bliss (virus), computer virus that infects Linux systems
- BLISS signature scheme, a post-quantum digital signature scheme

== Places ==
=== United States ===
- Bliss, Kentucky
- Bliss, Idaho
- Bliss, Missouri
- Bliss, New York
- Bliss, Oklahoma
- Bliss Corner, Massachusetts
- Bliss Township, Michigan
- Fort Bliss, Texas

=== Elsewhere ===
- Bliss (crater), small lunar impact crater that is located just to the west of the dark-floored crater Plato
- Bliss Bay, Greenland
- Bliss Street, Beirut, Lebanon

== Transportation ==
- Bliss (yacht), a superyacht built by Palmer Johnson in 2014
- Bliss (automobile), from the early 1900s
- Norwegian Bliss, a cruise ship

== Other uses ==
- Bliss (typeface), a font family
- Chicago Bliss, a team in the Lingerie Football League
- Blissymbols, an ideographic writing system
- Bliss bibliographic classification, a library classification system

== See also ==
- Blyss
- Ignorance is bliss (disambiguation)
- BLIS (disambiguation)
