= Batman/Hellboy/Starman =

1999 crossover comic book mini-series

- Issue #1, cover by Mike Mignola.

Publication information
- Publisher: DC Comics/Dark Horse Comics
- Format: Limited series
- Genre: Horror, superhero
- Publication date: January–February 1999
- No. of issues: 2
- Main characters: Batman; Hellboy; Starman

Creative team
- Created by: Bob Kane with Bill Finger; Mike Mignola; Gardner Fox; Jack Burnley; James Robinson; Tony Harris
- Written by: James Robinson
- Artist: Mike Mignola
- Letterer: Willie Schubert
- Colorist: Matt Hollingsworth
- Editor: Peter Tomasi

Batman/Hellboy/Starman is a DC Comics/Dark Horse Comics two-issue intercompany crossover comic book miniseries written by James Robinson with art by Mike Mignola published January to February 1999 featuring superheroes Batman, Hellboy and Starman.

== Publication history ==
=== Issues ===
==== Issue #1: Gotham Grey Evil ====
Issue #1 was published in January 1999 with a cover by Mike Mignola.

When the Golden Age Starman (Ted Knight) is kidnapped by neo-Nazi skinheads whilst giving a lecture on alternative energy sources, Batman and Hellboy team up to rescue him. The duo eventually track the group calling itself the Knights of October to a deserted airfield, but in the ensuing battle, their leader Dantz escaped with the prisoner on board a small plane. Hellboy vows to go after him, but Batman is called away to deal with an escaped Joker, so Ted's son Jack Knight, the new Starman, joins the mission.

==== Issue #2: Jungle Green Horror ====
Issue #2 was published February 1999 with a cover by Tony Harris.

Batman bids farewell as Hellboy and Starman board Bruce Wayne's private jet for the trip into the Amazon rainforest, and as soon as they bail out of the plane over their target, they come under fire. Once they penetrate the defences, they learn that Dantz is using Knight's scientific knowledge to reanimate the demonic Suggor Yogeroth. Hellboy invokes an ancient Lemurian incantation to dispel the demon and the duo are able to drive it back and release the captive Knight.
