= List of Starman characters =

Starman was a comic book published by DC Comics between 1994 and 2001. It was created by James Robinson and Tony Harris, starring their creation of Jack Knight, son of the Golden Age Starman. The comic featured cameos from several established DC characters, such as Batman and Superman, but also had a large ensemble cast made up of established characters and new creations.

== The Knights ==
Character	First appearance (in comics)	First appearance (in Starman)	Notes
Jack Knight	Zero Hour #1	Starman vol. 2, #0	Starman for the majority of the series. Now retired. Son of Ted Knight and brother of David. Father of Kyle Theo Knight.
Theodore "Ted" Knight	Adventure Comics #61	Starman vol. 2, #0	The original Starman, father of Jack and David, and grandfather of Kyle Theo Knight. Retired as of start of series.
David Knight	Starman #26	Starman vol. 2, #0	Son of Ted Knight, brother of Jack Knight, and uncle to Kyle Theo Knight. He is shot and killed in the opening issue of volume 2, but reappears throughout the series as a ghost.
Kyle Theo Knight	Created for the series.	Starman vol. 2, #38 (mentioned only)	Son of Jack Knight and Nash, nephew of David Knight, and grandson of Ted Knight. Kyle is conceived when Jack is unconscious and prisoner of Nash, and is born away from Opal City. At the close of the series, Kyle Knight is in the care of his father, who retires from superheroing to raise him and his daughter in San Francisco.
Sandra Knight	Police Comics #1 (Quality Comics); Justice League of America #107 (DC Comics)	Starman Secret Files #1, Starman vol. 2, #44	Ted Knight's cousin, Sandra Knight is notable as an early superheroine, the Golden Age adventurer called Phantom Lady. On one particular excursion to Opal City, Sandra is instrumental in helping Ted defeat the Prairie Witch. In her old age (as of series start), she is long since retired and acts as mentor to other female spies, most notably Dee Tyler.

== The Mists ==
Character	First appearance (in comics)	First appearance (in Starman)	Notes
Mist	Adventure Comics #67	Starman vol. 2, #0	Father of Nash and Kyle, and grandfather of Kyle Theo Knight. The original Starman's archenemy. Spent most of the series suffering from Alzheimer's disease aggravated by the death of his son.
Nash	Created for the series.	Starman vol. 2, #0	Daughter of the original Mist, sister of Kyle, and mother of Kyle Theo Knight. Spurred on by the death of her brother and her father's illness, Nash, who stutters, sets about transforming herself from a shy person into the new Starman's archenemy. Carries out a successful crime spree in Opal City before travelling the world to give birth to and raise her son. While travelling, she also seeks to perfect her villainy, in the process killing three superheroes.
Kyle	Created for the series.	Starman vol. 2, #0	Son of Mist, brother of Nash, and uncle of Kyle Theo Knight. Named after his father, Kyle was to be the inheritor of Mist's crime empire based in Opal City; this was the goal he had been trained for all his life. He had an early success when he assassinated then-Starman David Knight. This in turn led to a confrontation with his successor and brother, in which Jack Knight killed Kyle to ensure the safety of his father. Kyle returned later in the series as a ghost, having made his peace with the ghost of David Knight and asking for Jack's forgiveness for forcing him to commit murder. Jack's response is to wordlessly hug Kyle.

== The O'Dares ==
The O'Dares are the children of the original Starman's policeman ally, Billy "Red" O'Dare (who only appears briefly in the series and soon died due to liver problems caused by drinking). Each of them has inherited their father's red hair, and have joined the police force to carry on the family tradition and to protect Opal City. In the fulfillment of this commitment they come to the attention of the new Starman.

The two female members of the O'Dare family, Faith and Hope, are presumably joined by Charity following her engagement to Mason.

Starman Annual #1 indicates the O'Dare family survives into the far future as the "Dares"; noted for law enforcement on a far-off planet ruled by the Shade.

Character	First appearance (in comics)	First appearance (in Starman)	Notes
Clarence O'Dare	Created for the series.	Starman vol. 2, #10	Clarence is the eldest O'Dare sibling, and also the most senior police officer. As the new Starman begins to make a name for himself, Clarence is appointed the Commissioner's official superhero liaison and by the end of the series has been appointed Commissioner himself. He is also happily married to Faith, the only one of the O'Dare's with a long-term partner for the majority of the series.
Faith O'Dare	Created for the series.	Starman vol. 2, #16	Faith is the loving wife of Clarence O'Dare. She appears to be a homemaker, and has a very strong love of Christmastime.
Matt O'Dare	Created for the series.	Starman vol. 2, #1	At the beginning of the series, Matt is the "black sheep" of the family, unknown to his siblings on the payroll of local criminals and himself a murderer and thief. However, he undergoes a strange vision which, with the help of the Shade, he comes to realise means he is the reincarnation of Brian Savage who was a lawman in Opal City back in its lawless, Wild West days. This vision causes him to reassess his life, and he begins to attempt redemption whilst simultaneously erasing any evidence of his past wrongdoings. By the close of the series, Jack Knight describes him as a good cop.
Barry O'Dare	Created for the series.	Starman vol. 2, #1	Barry is the member of the O'Dare family that Jack Knight knows least about, and shortly before his fight with Captain Marvel he expressed a dislike for him. Barry was never as close to his siblings as they were to each other, and he played a pivotal role in Nash's second crime spree in Opal City.
Hope O'Dare	Created for the series.	Starman vol. 2, #1	Hope is the only female O'Dare by blood, not marriage. She is proud of her roots, particularly her Irish heritage and has often been described as being anti-English because of this. At the close of the series, however, she expresses a desire to leave Opal City to recharge her batteries, before returning to ask the Shade (an Englishman by birth) for a date. Several years later, during the events of Blackest Night, Hope and the Shade are in a relationship. She is fierce to both friends and enemies, and is often referred to by her family as the one that they are all afraid of.
Mason O'Dare	Created for the series.	Starman vol. 2, #1	Mason is the youngest of the O'Dare clan, and also the only one still working as a uniformed officer. He is silent, often afraid that he may say the wrong thing and so saying nothing at all, but is magnificent in action. He acts without hesitation, throwing himself into danger to protect the innocent and apprehend the guilty. As the series progresses, he becomes involved with Jack Knight's clairvoyant friend Charity and towards the end of the series becomes engaged to her.

== Supporting heroes ==
Character	First appearance (in comics)	First appearance (in Starman)	Notes
The Shade	Flash Comics #33	Starman vol. 2, #1	Originally a villain going up against various Golden Age heroes (notably the Flash), the Shade is revealed throughout the series to be an amoral character with a deep love of his adopted home of Opal City. Through this love, he comes to be on friendly terms with both Ted and Jack Knight and aids the modern Starman in many of his struggles. He also befriends Matt O'Dare and aids in his redemption, which in turn partially redeems the Shade himself.
Mikaal "Mik" Tomas	First Issue Special #12	Starman vol. 2, #3	A blue-skinned alien, Mikaal first came to Earth when his people plotted to destroy the planet. Instead, he turned against them to save humanity and then remained on Earth to briefly assume the mantle of Starman. He began to go under the anglicized name of "Michael Thomas" around this period, although he did not attempt to hide his blue skin. He was kidnapped to appear as part of a millionaire's collection. Eventually, he was sold to a circus which was visited by Jack Knight. Knight helped Mikaal free himself, despite being unable to communicate with him. Eventually, Mikaal remembered how to speak English and gradually rediscovered his forgotten history.
Solomon "Solly" Grundy	All American Comics #61	Starman vol. 2, #10	A half-formed plant elemental, Solomon Grundy is reborn every time he dies as a completely different character. When reborn in a more gentle and childlike temperament than usual, he relocated to Opal City's sewers, where he hid until Jack Knight went searching for him. Taking him back to Ted Knight to look after, Jack rechristened the gentle version Solly and he became almost a part of the Knight family. In particular, he built up a good relationship with previous Starman Mikaal Tomas. This relationship proved fatal for Solly, as he died saving Tomas' life. True to form, Grundy was reborn, but this version more resembled his previous incarnations, and the bond with the Knight family was broken as he went back to his criminal ways.
Jon Valor, the Black Pirate	Action Comics #23	Starman vol. 2, #2	In the 16th century, Jon Valor was a privateer working on a commission from the King, and always working to a strong moral code of justice. However, following the death of his estranged son, he was accused of his murder and hung in the port that would eventually become Opal City. Before he died, he laid a terrible curse on the city that no spirit that died there would know rest until he had been proved innocent. He remained in the city as a ghost, protecting the innocent, before he came to the new Starman to ask for his help. Jack Knight promised his aid, but as things turned out it was Hamilton Drew and the Dibny's who eventually proved Valor's innocence and set him (and every soul that had ever died in Opal) free.
Jake "Bobo" Benetti	Created for the series.	Starman vol. 2, #29	Benetti gained super strength as a young man, which he used in the 1950s and 1960s to help him rob banks. He earned the nickname "Bobo" (which he personally never cared for, but let Jack Knight alone use) and was eventually caught and imprisoned for his crimes. Upon his release, Bennetti found himself in an Opal City he both remembered and did not recognise, feeling old and out of place — something not helped by the fact that he had retained his 1960s fashion sense and dialect. Despite a promise to a woman that he would go straight, he considered robbing the Opal City bank and getting put back in prison, somewhere he at least understood. As he went in to rob the bank, he found that it was already being robbed by a gang of criminals. As Starman arrived, Benetti decided instead to help him capture the criminals. In gratitude, the bank offered him a job as their head of security. Later, when Jack Knight retired and the bank decided that Benetti was attracting criminals, he was given a career as one of Opal's new licensed superheroes.
Black Condor	Black Condor #1	Starman vol. 2, #47	Black Condor was a solitary hero, whose investigations eventually brought him to Opal City and into contact with Jack Knight. At first attempting to keep to himself, he found himself warming to Opal's charms, and when the opportunity to leave presented itself to him, he decided instead to stay. Shortly before Jack Knight retired, he helped protect the city from Nash's second crime spree and registered with the Opal City Police as one of their officially recognised superheroes. He took over part of the responsibility for Opal when Jack retired.
Phantom Lady	Action Comics Weekly #636	Starman vol. 2, #56	Dee Tyler, the second Phantom Lady, was sent to Opal City on behalf of her mentor Sandra Knight. She initially worked in an attempt to clear the Shade of his murder charges, and stuck around for quite some time to aid Jack Knight and company in protecting Opal City.
Ralph Dibny and Sue Dibny	Ralph in The Flash #112; Sue in The Flash #119	Starman vol. 2, #56	The Dibny's were a married couple who were brought to Opal following a request from Ted Knight. Although Ralph has stretching super powers, it was primarily as a detective that his expertise was needed, and he leapt at the chance to help — especially once he found that he would be working alongside his personal hero, Hamilton Drew. Following Nash's second crime wave in Opal, Ralph and Sue promised Jack that they would stay on a little while in the city to help protect it, but told him that they were the restless, wandering types and would be unlikely to stay forever.
Hamilton Drew	Created for the series.	Starman vol. 2, #24	Drew was an early 20th-century consulting detective of the Sherlock Holmes school based in Ivy Town. Whilst investigating a spate of disappearances, Drew was captured by the "poster demon" and held in Hell for more than a century. Finally released by the heroic actions of Matt O'Dare, the Shade, and Jack Knight, Drew returned to modern day Opal to continue his life. At first, Drew was unsure he would be able to continue working as a consulting detective, but eventually he settled into a new life. He formed a good working relationship with Ralph Dibny, and was instrumental in saving the city during Nash's second crime spree.
Will Payton	Starman #1	Starman vol. 2, #3	Payton came from Arizona, and took up the mantle of Starman after being hit by a beam of cosmic radiation. He apparently died whilst fighting Eclipso in space, but during her relationship with Jack Knight, Sadie Falk revealed that she believed Payton was still alive and somewhere in space. She asked Jack to go and search for him, and out of love for her, he did. Jack eventually found Payton captive on the planet Kranaltine, where it was discovered he had a mysterious connection to the deceased Starman of that world, Prince Gavyn.

== Notable Opal City residents ==
Character	First appearance (in comics)	First appearance (in Starman)	Notes
Sadie Falk	Starman #1	Starman vol. 2, #7	Sadie was a young woman that Jack Knight bumped into around Opal, often receiving the sharp edge of her tongue when he did. Despite this, they began a relationship and were soon very much in love. But Sadie was keeping a secret from Jack, being that she was really Jayne Payton, the sister of former Starman Will Payton, and believed that Will was still alive. She was afraid that when she told Jack this, it would be the end of their relationship, but instead, because he loved her so much, Jack agreed to go to space to try to find Will Payton. Whilst Jack was in space, Sadie decided that if Jack was doing something for her, she should do something for him and took over his responsibility to help Jon Valor prove his innocence. This led to her becoming entangled in Nash's second crime wave in Opal City. Once this was over, and Jack returned to her, she discovered she was pregnant with his daughter and decided she had to leave, terrified by the violent life that Jack lived. After she had settled in San Francisco, she wrote to him and begged him to join her there, and, abandoning his role as Starman and taking his son with him, Jack did.
Charity	Forbidden Tales of Dark Mansion #7	Starman vol. 2, #2	A fortune teller who had recently moved to Opal City at the time David Knight was assassinated, Charity runs a shop near Jack Knight's antique store. She was previously a "good friend" of Zatara, and has genuine clairvoyant talents. At their first meeting, she predicts that Jack will face Captain Marvel and journey into space. At first, Jack finds her attractive and asks her on a date, but Charity insists that she has come to Opal to meet the man she will marry and is now saving herself for him — eventually she begins a relationship with Mason O'Dare that culminates in him proposing to her as the series ends. Charity O'Dare reappears as a supporting character in the Trinity series, aiding fellow clairvoyant Tarot in the understanding of her powers and the Worldsoul bond.

== Enemies ==
Character	First appearance (in comics)	First appearance (in Starman)	Notes
Simon Culp	Created for the series.	Starman vol. 2, #65	Culp was an unpleasant, villainous dwarf involved in the same mysterious event that gave the Shade his powers — powers which Culp shares. The two quickly fell into confrontation and Culp soon counted himself the Shade's nemesis. They fought many times over the years, until finally the Shade thought he had destroyed him for good in London during the Blitz. Culp resurfaced unexpectedly and was shown to be the mastermind behind Nash's second crime spree in Opal City, facing off against the Shade yet again. Culp has taught himself to speak French with a passable accent, as he considers his native Cockney English to be vulgar.
The Infernal Doctor Pip	Created for the series.	Starman vol. 2, #30	Dr. Pip was an explosives genius who terrorised Opal City in a bombing campaign. He managed to escape from Jack and the Black Pirate once, employing Copperhead as a bodyguard to ensure that he can again. He was near-fatally injured when caught in one of his own explosions, an explosion which also claimed Solomon Grundy, and tried to enact a final piece of revenge by blowing up an apartment block. With his powers interrupted by the Genesis Wave, Jack found himself unable to stop Pip, until help came from an unexpected source and Pip was killed and his bomb defused. Pip's influence was not gone forever, and he still had a part to play in the Nash's second crime wave.
Lucas Ludlow-Dalt	Created for the series.	Starman vol. 2, #47	The son of the original Spider, Lucas was at heart a Ludlow — the family that had perpetrated a vendetta against the Shade for several generations. He came to Opal City to kill the Shade, something which inevitably brought him into conflict with Starman. He took part in Nash's second crime wave and was one of the few villains to escape. He later returned to attempt to assassinate Jack Knight, and the Shade vowed that he would hunt him down, leaving Jack free to leave Opal and rejoin Sadie.
Bliss	Created for the series.	Starman vol. 2, #7	An incubus who ran the circus where Jack first met Mikaal. He fed off emotions, with a particular fondness for the suffering of the members of his freak show. Jack confronted him, and the surge of hope in the freaks weakened Bliss enough for Jack and Mikaal to banish him back to Hell. His henchman, Crusher, would later take part in Culp's attack on Opal City.
The Prairie Witch	Starman Annual #1	Starman vol. 2, #68	Abigail Moorland is a thief who commits her crimes with a witch motif. She tried to convince the citizens of Opal City of being a real witch by riding a magical flying broom and painting her skin green like the Wicked Witch of the West. Ted Knight proved that her magical powers were all fake. The Witch returned to trouble Jack Knight in the pages of the Grand Guignol storyline.
