= Bliss (comics) =

Bliss, in comics, may refer to:

- Bliss (Marvel Comics), a member of the Marvel Comics mutant group The Morlocks
- Bliss (DC Comics), an incubus who appeared in the DC Comics series Starman
- Bliss (Wildstorm), a Wildstorm comic book character
- Bliss, a syndicated newspaper comic by Harry Bliss

== See also ==
- Bliss (disambiguation)
