= BLIS =

BLIS or Blis may refer to:

- Bachelor of Library Science or Bachelor of Library and Information Science degree
- Blind Spot Information System in automobiles
- Bilkent Laboratory and International School in Ankara, Turkey
- Bacteriocin-like Inhibitory Substances, produced by some strains of Streptococcus salivarius
- BLIS (software), BLAS-like Library Instantiation Software
- Blis Technologies, a New Zealand biotechnology company
- Bitame Lucia International School, preschool and primary school near Yaoundé, Cameroon

== Other uses ==
- BLIS/COBOL, a computer operating system
- Blis-et-Born, a commune in southwestern France

== See also ==
- Bliss (disambiguation)
