= Starman (Prince Gavyn) =

Fictional comics superhero

- Starman as depicted in Rann-Thanagar War #4 (October 2005). Art by Ivan Reis and Joe Prado (pencillers), Marc Campos (inker), and John Kalisz (colorist).

Publication information
- Publisher: DC Comics
- First appearance: Adventure Comics #467 (January 1980)
- Created by: Paul Levitz; Steve Ditko

In-story information
- Alter ego: Prince Gavyn
- Species: Metahuman
- Place of origin: Throneworld
- Team affiliations: Justice League
- Abilities: Flight; Energy manipulation; Immunity to heat and radiation

Starman (Prince Gavyn) is a superhero in DC Comics, as one of several heroes called Starman within the DC Universe. Created by writer Paul Levitz and designed by artist Steve Ditko, the character debuted in Adventure Comics #467 in November, 1979 (cover dated January 1980). The character appeared in only 13 stories between 1979 and 1981. In 1986, he was briefly mentioned in the crossover comic Crisis on Infinite Earths as having recently died while trying to protect his native planet. Prince Gavyn's story was expanded in a later Starman comic book series published from 1994 to 2001 that focused on the hero Jack Knight and revisited all DC characters who had used the Starman name. The same series reveals Gavyn's life energy survives in the body of Will Payton, another DC Comics hero called Starman.

In his original stories, Gavyn is native to the planet Kranaltine (also called Throneworld by his people) and a member of the royal family of an interstellar monarchy called the Crown Imperial. After almost being killed by his elder sister, Gavyn discovers he has the mutant abilities to absorb and process stellar radiation. He is then given bracers and a staff that allow him to channel and control the energy in his body, allowing him to fly and deliver energy blasts. Guided by the alien sage M'ntorr, Gavyn evolves from being an arrogant, self-involved person into a noble, affable hero determined to protect life and end oppression.

== Development ==
In an interview, Levitz described the creation of the character, “Len Wein was the editor responsible for offering the assignments,” Paul Levitz said. “He asked me to come up with a series to fit a slot in Adventure Comics. I had just read a history of the Ottoman Empire, which talked about a period when it was the practice to kill off all rival claimants to the throne when a new sultan was named. I twisted that into a science-fiction background, and was lucky enough to get Steve and Romeo as the artists.”

Fans were suspicious of the similarities to the Marvel Comics character, Captain Marvel. Editorial retorted In the letters column in issue #471 of Adventure Comics. "The Starman costume... is more of a cousin to the Captain Marvel uniform, than a descendant of it. Both are heavily influenced by an earlier Steve Ditko character, Captain Atom.

== Publication history ==
Prince Gavyn first appears in Adventure Comics #467, published in November 1979 with a cover date of January 1980 (following the common practice of comic books being printed two to three months before their cover dates). The issue credits writer Paul Levitz as Gavyn's "creator" and penciller Steve Ditko as his "designer." The same issues feature the debut of Gavyn's advisor M'ntorr, his sister Queen Clryssa, his love interest Lady Merria, and his aide Jediah Rikane.

Prince Gavyn appears as Starman for 12 issues of Adventure Comics, from issue #467 to #478. He later appears in a team-up with Superman in DC Comics Presents #36 (1981) in a story entitled "Whatever Happened to Starman?", written by Jim Starlin and Paul Levitz, with art by Starlin and colorist Gene D'Angelo. The issue concludes Gavyn's adventures by removing his sister, having him marry Merria, and making him the ruler of his monarchy.

Gavyn appears in one-panel of Crisis on Infinite Earths #10 (1986). The panel shows footage of him fighting to protect his home as narration by the character Harbinger informs the reader that he died while doing so.

A new Starman ongoing series begins in 1988 featuring Will Payton, a man of Earth who gains powers when he is struck by energy from outer space. Following the cancellation of this series, another Starman series begins 1994 starring a hero called Jack Knight, the son of Ted Knight, the original Starman of DC Comics. This series later reveals the energy that empowered Will Payton was energy released from Gavyn's body during his death. It is left ambiguous whether the real Will Payton was fused with Gavyn's mind when he first gained super-powers or if the event actually killed Payton and left Gavyn's spirit inhabiting his body and accessing his memories. Regardless, the fused character now remembers life as Gavyn and adopts that name and appearance again. The new Gavyn resumes his career as an outer space hero.

In the 2009 Strange Adventures series (volume 3), Gavyn joins with the villain Synnar in hopes that it will save others. Synnar does not honor the bargain and instead transforms Gavyn into a villain called Fusion.

== Fictional character biography ==
Gavyn is a spoiled, playboy prince of an alien empire. He discovered he was a mutant who could survive unaided in space when, by ancient royal custom, he was thrown out of a spaceship airlock to prevent him from challenging his sister's claim to the leadership of Throneworld. Gavyn was given jeweled wristbands and a staff by the mysterious mystic M'ntorr, which allowed him to channel his cosmic powers into the ability to fly interstellar distances and shoot bolts of energy. For a time keeping his true identity a secret as a masked protector of the realm, Gavyn becomes the leader of Throneworld after his sister is assassinated.

In Crisis on Infinite Earths, Gavyn is seemingly killed by an antimatter wave. The 1990s Starman series revealed that his fate was different from previously believed. It was revealed that Gavyn was converted into pure energy, which became the source of the beam of light that struck Payton, granting him his powers.

Gavyn reappears in Rann–Thanagar War, where he is transformed into the fire entity Fusion.

== In other media ==
Prince Gavyn / Starman makes non-speaking cameo appearances in Justice League Unlimited as a member of the Justice League.
