= Still Remains =

American metalcore band

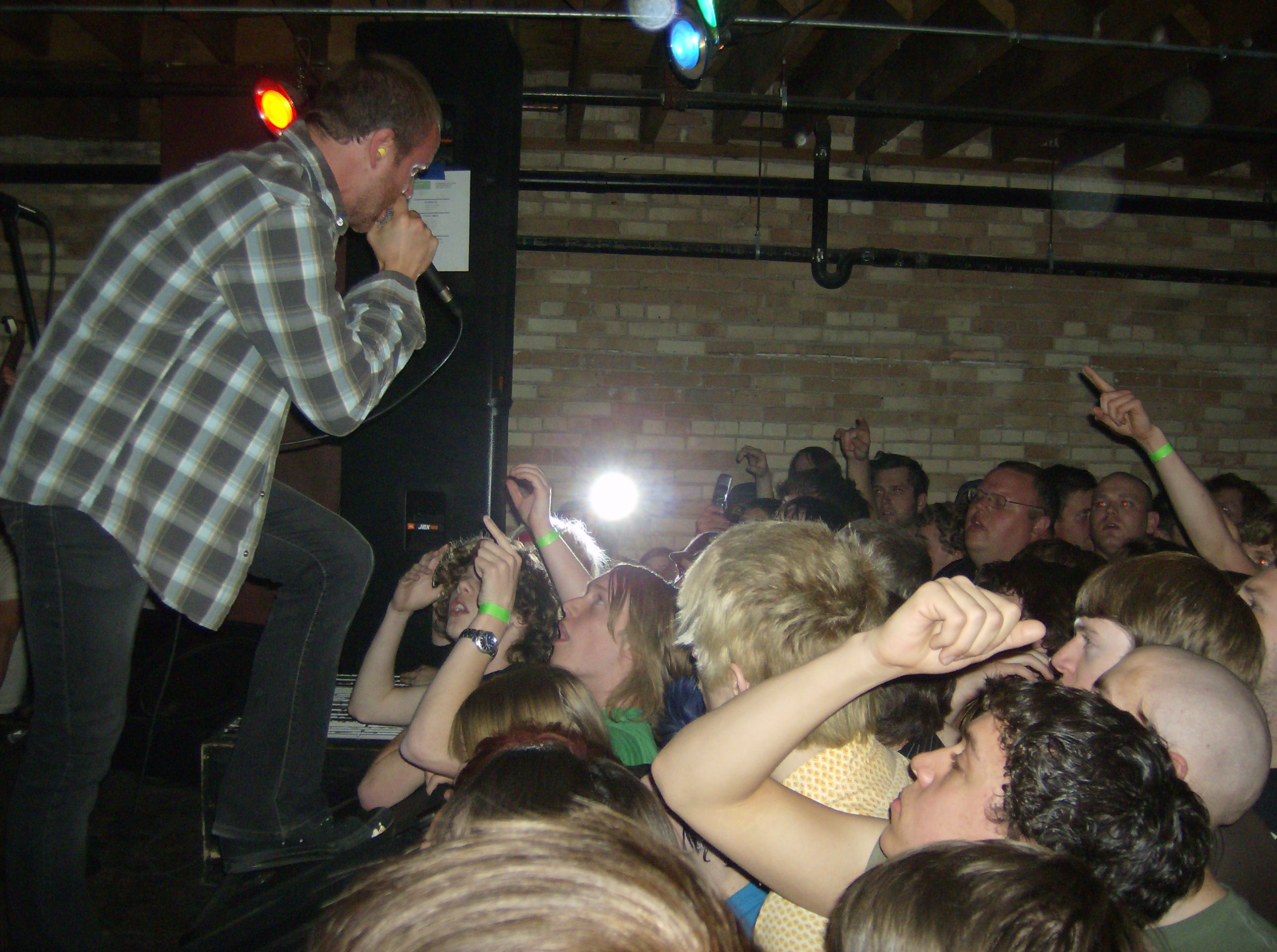
- Still Remains' hometown farewell show in 2008 at Skelletones in Grand Rapids, Michigan.

Background information
- Origin: Grand Rapids, Michigan, U.S.
- Genres: Metalcore
- Years active: 2002–2008, 2011–present
- Label: Roadrunner
- Members: T.J. Miller; Mike Church; Jordan Whelan; Zach Roth; A.J. Barrette; Kenny Polidan
- Past members: Steve Hetland; Adrian "Bone" Green; Ben Schauland; Cameron MacIntosh; Steve Schallert; Jordan Gilliam; Evan Willey

Still Remains is an American metalcore band from Grand Rapids, Michigan. They formed out of previous local bands Shades of Amber and Unition. They have released three studio albums, Of Love and Lunacy, The Serpent and Ceasing to Breathe, all to positive reviews, and had minor UK chart success with the single "Dancing with the Enemy". They disbanded in mid-2008, but reunited for one final show in March 2011. In May the band announced that the reunion would be permanent.

== History ==
In October 2003, Still Remains recorded their EP, Dying with a Smile. These are songs that the band had been playing since the fall of 2001. From the beginning, Still Remains were playing at local venues (such as Grand Rapids' Skelletones) to build a name for themselves. A year later, another EP was released, titled If Love Was Born to Die. Still Remains were never a part of the Benchmark Records' roster, however the now defunct label funded the EP.

Shortly after this, the band signed to Roadrunner Records, where they released their debut studio album on May 3, 2005, titled Of Love and Lunacy. The album spawned two singles, "The Worst Is Yet to Come" and "White Walls". The lead single was played on music channels such as Scuzz and Kerrang. The band toured in support of the album; their first tour of the United Kingdom was on the Roadrunner Records "Roadrage" Tour, alongside on Trivium and 3 Inches of Blood. They also joined Bullet for My Valentine, Aiden and Hawthorne Heights on the Kerrang XXV tour. A few months later they started recording their second album, The Serpent.

The Serpent was released on August 7, 2007. The album saw a change in the vocalist Miller's style, with more melodic singing present than on their previous record. The lead single, "Stay Captive", was played extensively on Scuzz. The second single released was "Dancing with the Enemy", which is also played on music channels. In early fall of 2007, they supported Aiden followed by a November tour supporting Atreyu in the UK. For January and February 2008, they replaced 36 Crazyfists in support of Bullet for My Valentine. Their final tour in the spring of 2008 would be dubbed The Serpent Tour and featured Gwen Stacy, Secret & Whisper, and Catherine.

When Still Remains started their hiatus, T.J. Miller began writing with his new band From the Raven, which consists of members from Ozenza, Apostles, and The Omega Experiment. Ben Schauland joined the glamcore band Blessed by a Broken Heart under the moniker "Rex Krueger". Jordan Whelan and Adrian "Bone" Green formed the band Anthem Alone. Mike Church joined forces with A.J. Barrette to form the band Juleus. Evan Willey joined Apostles, a rock-based metal band. Cameron MacIntosh formed the band Chinook.

Still Remains reunited for Haste the Day's final show on March 11, 2011, at the Egyptian Room at the Old National Centre in Indianapolis, Indiana. The band performed a nine–song set and the lineup consisted of members present during the production of the Of Love and Lunacy album, as well as Adrian "Bone" Green playing drums on select songs. On May 7, the band announced via their official Facebook page that a full reunion is taking place, and they are working on new music.

On January 1, 2012, Still Remains released "Reading Lips", their first song in four years. In March 2013 the band launched a Kickstarter campaign to fund the recording of their new full-length album, which is titled Ceasing to Breathe and was released on December 17, 2013.

In 2025, Still Remains announced a new EP titled Spirit Breaker, the first single of which titled "The Wound and the Weapon" was released October 31st, 2025. They performed live shows throughout 2025 Including an appearance at Furnace Fest 2025 in Birmingham, Alabama on October 3rd, 2025. A 20th Anniversary tour for their album Of Love and Lunacy in the United Kingdom with supporting acts Devil Sold His Soul and Eschalon that November.

On February 2nd, 2026 Still Remains was announced to be performing at Upheaval Festival in their hometown of Grand Rapids, Michigan on July 18th, 2026.

A new single, "Erase You", was released May 2026. On June 12, 2026 Still Remains released Spirit Breaker.

== Band members ==
Current

- T.J. Miller – lead vocals (2002–2008, 2011–present)
- Jordan Whelan – guitar (2002–2008, 2011–present)
- Mike Church – guitar, vocals (2005–2008, 2011–present)
- A.J. Barrette – drums (2004–2005, 2011–present)
- Zach Roth – keyboards, synthesizers (2002–2006, 2011–present)
- Kenny Polidan – bass (2012–present)

Former

- Jordan Gilliam – guitar (2002–2003)
- Cameron MacIntosh – drums (2002–2004)
- Steve Schallert – guitar, backing vocals (2003–2004)
- Adrian "Bone" Green – drums (2005–2008, 2011 reunion show)
- Steve Hetland – bass (2006–2008)
- Ben Schauland – keyboards, synthesizers (2006–2008)
- Evan Willey – bass (2002–2006, 2011)

Touring

- Jason Wood – bass, backing vocals (2006)

Timeline

== Discography ==
Albums

- Of Love and Lunacy (2005)
- The Serpent (2007)
- Ceasing to Breathe (2013)

EPs

- Dying with a Smile (2003)
- If Love Was Born to Die (2004)
- Reading Lips (2012)
- Spirit Breaker (2026)

Other songs

- "Head Like a Hole", Nine Inch Nails cover featured on High Voltage!: A Brief History of Rock
