= Starman (Jack Knight) =

Comic book superhero in the DC Comics

- Jack Knight as Starman; cover artwork for Starman vol. 2 #0 (August 1994), art by Tony Harris.

Publication information
- Publisher: DC Comics
- First appearance: Zero Hour #1 (September 1994)
- Created by: James Robinson; Tony Harris

In-story information
- Alter ego: Jack Knight
- Species: Human
- Team affiliations: Justice Society of America; Justice League
- Partnerships: Stargirl
- Abilities: Competent martial artist; Via cosmic staff: Rapid flight; Telekinesis; Energy manipulation; Stellar energy absorption; Gravity manipulation

Starman (Jack Knight) is a superhero in the DC Comics Universe and a member of the Justice Society of America. He is the son of the original Starman, Ted Knight. Created by James Robinson and Tony Harris, he first appeared in Zero Hour #1 (September 1994).

== Fictional character biography ==
=== Origin ===
Jack is the son of Ted Knight, who, as Starman, was a Golden Age superhero. Although as a child Jack is fascinated by his father's heroic life, he becomes more and more rebellious as he grows older. By the time he reaches adulthood, Jack is disdainful of his father's past. Jack's older brother David takes over his father's mantle, while Jack often regards the superhero role with open disdain.

Although Jack is shown as both schooled and talented in fine art, his true passion is collectibles. He eventually becomes the owner and operator of an antique and collectibles store.

Jack's role in the family changes after David is murdered by the son of Mist, one of his father's old arch-foes. The Mist then attempts to also murder Jack, who narrowly escapes by using one of his father's old gravity rods. Jack resolves to track down the Mist out of a desire to protect his father. He eventually kills Mist's son in battle and captures both Mist and his daughter Nash, who vows revenge. Mist later succumbs to dementia after the death of his son.

=== Early career ===
Jack reluctantly makes a deal to become Starman if his father agrees to devote his scientific knowledge to the betterment of mankind. Jack eschews a "uniform", instead opting to wear street clothes and protective goggles.

Nash returns as the new Mist and attempts to become Jack's nemesis. She drugs and rapes Jack, with the intent of becoming pregnant. She later gives birth to Jack's son Kyle Knight. Mist intends to raise him to hate Jack and all he stands for.

Although Jack discovers many latent heroic qualities within himself, he only fully embraces them when Nash theorizes that she and Jack are two sides of the same coin. Jack vows to prove her wrong. To do so, he travels to Hell to rescue two men he hardly knows, tries valiantly to save a friendly incarnation of Solomon Grundy, and helps prove Bulletman's innocence when he is accused of having been a Nazi agent during World War II.

Later, Jack joins the Justice Society of America, following in his father's footsteps. Working alongside his father's contemporaries, Jack fights the wizard Mordru, the terrorist organization Kobra, and the time-traveler Extant. Jack has to split his time between Opal City and the JSA's hometown of New York, making him a part-time member. He resigns from the team following his father's death and the end of his superhero career.

Jack lives and operates out of Opal City and has a number of allies. First are the O'Dares, a family of Opal City police officers. In addition, Jack regularly receives advice from a fortune teller named Charity, who has a shop in the alleys of the Opal. Charity had previously appeared in the 1970s series Forbidden Tales of Dark Mansion, where she served as narrator. Jack also rescues Mikaal Tomas, an alien who briefly operated in New York under the name Starman during the 1970s. Jack's most intriguing ally is the Shade, a villain who aids Jack because he considers Opal City his home and wants it to remain quiet. Over time, Jack comes to question whether or not Shade's motives are more noble than he lets on. Jack also finds common ground with Jake "Bobo" Benetti, a retired super-strong bank robber from his father's days.

=== Among the Stars and Return to Earth ===
During his heroic career, Jack meets and falls in love with a woman named Sadie. When she reveals that she is the sister of Will Payton, yet another hero to bear the name of Starman, he vows to set off into space to find her missing brother.

Jack first seeks help in his journey from both Captain Marvel and the Justice League of America. Finally, equipped with his father's consciousness duplicated in a Mother Box, and joined by Mikaal Tomas, Jack sets off on an intergalactic journey. However, a chance encounter diverts Jack from his intended route, and he is lost in both time and space. He meets the Legion of Super-Heroes, counsels Jor-El (father of Superman), and then helps Adam Strange fight an invading empire. As a prisoner of the empire, Jack foments revolt to escape, working with members of the Green Lantern Corps, the Omega Men and the New Gods. Jack meets Will Payton, whose body has been merged with the mind of yet another Starman, Prince Gavyn. Together, the many Starmen work together to save Gavyn's empire. Jack leaves Gavyn to run the empire, and returns to Earth to tell Sadie her brother's fate.

Upon his return, Jack faces almost all of his foes in a massive battle that nearly destroys Opal City. During the battle, Jack's father sacrifices himself to save the city. Following his father's death, Jack undertakes one final adventure, to resolve the mystery of the last recorded Starman, the Starman of 1951. Having the answer to that final riddle, Jack retires and takes his son to live with him and Sadie in San Francisco. Jack gave his cosmic rod on to Courtney Whitmore, who calls herself Stargirl and currently operates with the JSA.

=== After Jack Knight ===
It is revealed that Manhunter (Kate Spencer) is the granddaughter of Phantom Lady, who is Ted's first cousin once removed, making Kate Jack's second cousin once removed.

James Robinson returned to the Starman series in January 2010 for a single issue (#81) that was a tie-in to the DC event, Blackest Night. It was one of the eight "dead" titles being revived for one issue. This issue did not feature Jack Knight, but instead focused on Opal City, the Shade, and a Black Lantern Starman. During the events of the issue, David's corpse is resurrected as a Black Lantern; he attacks the Shade and Hope O'Dare, and announces plans to go to San Francisco to kill Jack, but he is ultimately defeated.

== Powers and equipment ==
Jack Knight has no superpowers. Although he has been told by Charity that he possesses the same sight as she, only to a lesser degree, he has never truly explored it. Instead, he wields a "cosmic staff", a device invented by Jack's father Ted, the original Starman. The cosmic staff utilizes the same technology as the prototype "gravity rods" that Ted once wielded, and which Jack used before his father created the cosmic staff for him. The cosmic staff grants Jack powers including rapid flight, levitation of objects, and energy manipulation. The staff absorbs stellar energy which can then be manipulated into defensive force fields and offensive energy blasts of incredible power. Jack can use both powers at once to protect himself from atmospheric damage in high-velocity flight. Another power of the rod, seen late in the series, is that it is capable of receiving Jack's mental commands from a distance (this is a feature of the device, an ability to "attune itself to the user", and not a power of Jack's). At present, the staff is attuned to its current wielder, Stargirl; it seems difficult to quickly change the staff's affiliation.

Jack is also a competent martial artist, trained primarily in jujutsu.

== Other versions ==
In the alternate future of Kingdom Come, Jack has a teenaged African American successor known as "Stars". Though he takes his name and motif from the Star-Spangled Kid, Stars uses Jack's cosmic staff and dresses in a similar leather jacket and bandana.

In the alternate future of Titans Tomorrow, Courtney Whitmore is known as Starwoman and wears Jack's trademark jacket in addition to the staff.

== Reception ==
The character of Jack Knight, specifically his relationship with his father and Opal City, has been seen as an example of a "new wave" of DC Comics from the 1990s reviving Golden Age heroes, with an emphasis on nostalgia, legacy, and mythology building.

== In other media ==
=== Television ===
A television series based on Jack Knight / Starman and his father Ted Knight was being developed by the creators of Smallville and Birds of Prey. Following the latter series' failure in 2003, the Starman series was described as "indefinitely on hold".

=== Merchandise ===
- Jack Knight / Starman received two figures in the DC Direct line in 1999.
- Jack Knight / Starman received a figure in Mattel's DC Universe Classics line.

== See also ==
- List of Starman characters
