= Tom Lyle =

American comics artist (1953–2019)

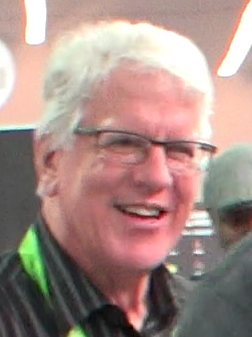
- Lyle in 2015
- Born: Thomas Stanford Lyle; November 2, 1953 Jacksonville, Florida, U.S.
- Died: November 19, 2019 (aged 66) Savannah, Georgia, U.S.
- Areas: Writer, Penciller
- Notable works: The Comet; Robin; Spider-Man; Starman

Thomas Stanford Lyle (November 2, 1953 – November 19, 2019) was an American comics artist, best known for his work on Starman and Robin for DC Comics, and Spider-Man for Marvel Comics.

== Career ==
Tom Lyle's comics career began in the mid-1980s penciling titles such Airboy, Strike!, and Airwolf for Eclipse Comics. From 1988 to 1990, he penciled DC Comics' Starman series with writer Roger Stern, introducing the second Blockbuster in Starman #9 (April 1989).

Lyle worked on the first solo Robin limited series with writer Chuck Dixon. The series was reprinted a number of times, and led to two sequel miniseries – Robin II: Joker's Wild and Robin III: Cry of the Huntress – by the same creative team. Dixon and Lyle also co-created the Electrocutioner in Detective Comics #644 (May 1992) and Stephanie Brown in Detective Comics #647 (August 1992).

Meanwhile, in 1991 he worked on The Comet for DC's Impact Comics imprint, which he pencilled and plotted, with writer Mark Waid contributing the scripts.

In 1993, Lyle started working for Marvel Comics, as penciler of Spider-Man. He was one of the artists on the "Maximum Carnage" and "Clone Saga" storylines which ran through the Spider-Man titles, during which time he designed the original blue hoodie-and-red spandex costume worn by the Scarlet Spider, a clone of Spider-Man. He also co-created the character Annex in The Amazing Spider-Man Annual #27 with writer Jack C. Harris. Lyle penciled the three-issue miniseries Venom: Funeral Pyre, which co-starred the Punisher and introduced the villain Pyre.

Lyle's other work for Marvel included Punisher vol. 3 with writer John Ostrander from 1995 to 1997, a Warlock mini-series which he wrote himself in 1998, and issues of Mutant X in 2000 and 2001.

He drew several issues of Star Wars for Dark Horse Comics in 2000.

He was the artist on the 2004 series Chickasaw Adventures for the Chickasaw Nation.

Between 2005 and his death in 2019, he taught sequential art at the Savannah College of Art and Design.

Preceded by n/a	Starman penciller 1988–1990	Succeeded by Dave Hoover
Preceded by n/a	The Comet penciller 1991–1992	Succeeded by Turner Allen
Preceded by Jim Aparo	Detective Comics penciller 1992	Succeeded by Graham Nolan
Preceded by Bob McLeod	Spider-Man penciller 1993–1995	Succeeded by John Romita Jr.
