= The Serpent (album) =

Studio album by Still Remains
- Released: August 7, 2007
- Recorded: The Omen Room studios, Sonikwire studios, Studiotte
- Genre: Metalcore
- Length: 41:52
- Label: Roadrunner
- Producer: Steve Evetts

Still Remains chronology
| Of Love and Lunacy (2005) | The Serpent (2007) | Ceasing to Breathe (2013) |

Professional ratings
Review scores
| Source | Rating |
|---|---|
| Allmusic | 3.5/5 stars |
| DecoyMusic.com | 3/5 stars |
| Alternative Press | 2.5/5 stars |

The Serpent is the fourth release and second studio album by Still Remains, released on August 7, 2007 on Roadrunner Records. The first single to be released was the track "Stay Captive," which was followed by "Dancing with the Enemy". The lyrics and title for the song "Avalanche" are inspired by the role-playing video game Final Fantasy VII. The Serpent reached number 95 in the UK Albums Chart.

== Track listing ==
All tracks are written by Still Remains.

| No. | Title | Length |
|---|---|---|
| 1. | "The Serpent" | 2:14 |
| 2. | "The Wax Walls of an Empty Room" | 3:42 |
| 3. | "Stay Captive" | 4:09 |
| 4. | "Anemia in Your Sheets" | 3:59 |
| 5. | "Maria" | 4:32 |
| 6. | "Dropped from the Cherry Tree" | 3:40 |
| 7. | "Dancing with the Enemy" | 3:04 |
| 8. | "The River Song" | 4:00 |
| 9. | "Sleepless Nights Alone" | 3:42 |
| 10. | "An Undesired Reunion" | 3:24 |
| 11. | "Avalanche" | 5:21 |

Special Edition Bonus Tracks
| No. | Title | Length |
|---|---|---|
| 12. | "What is Love?" | 3:51 |
| 13. | "Float Like a Feather" | 3:39 |
| 14. | "I Can Never Be Your Lover" | 2:52 |

== Personnel ==
- T.J. Miller - lead vocals
- Mike Church - guitars, clean vocals
- Jordan Whelan - guitars
- Steve Hetland - bass, additional vocals on "An Undesired Reunion"
- Ben Schauland - keyboards, additional vocals on "Sleepless Nights Alone"
- Adrian "Bone" Green - drums
- Steve Evetts - production, engineering
- Logan Mader and Lucas Banker - mixing
- Allan Hessler - additional engineering, digital editing
- Mike Gitter - A&R
- Charles Dooher - art direction
- Garett Zunt - art direction, package design
- Todd Bell - photography
