= Comet (Impact Comics) =

The Comet
- Cover to The Comet #1 (July 1991), art by Tom Lyle.

Publication information
- Publisher: DC Comics
- First appearance: The Comet #1 (July 1991)
- Created by: Tom Lyle; Mark Waid

In-story information
- Alter ego: Rob Connors
- Notable aliases: Jay Cole
- Abilities: Superhuman strength; Energy blasts; Flight; Shapeshifting; Protective halo

The Comet is a superhero that first appeared in the DC Comics' Impact Comics series, The Comet. The character is loosely based on the Archie Comics character The Comet.

== Fictional character biography ==
The Comet's story is narrated, first-person, by the character himself in the past tense. In the beginning, he is an ordinary human named Rob Connors, whose only real ambition in life is to play professional baseball. His ambition is somewhat stilted by his parents, who are scientists living in arctic areas.

Rob returns to his parents' home one day to find it torn apart by some kind of battle, which to all appearances took places weeks ago: our first sign of a strange continuity clash, since Rob had been gone only a matter of hours. In an attempt to call for help, Rob is forced to climb up the radio mast to fix it. It collapses under his weight, and he is pinned beneath it, unable to free himself until a sudden surge of energy sends him soaring through the air. Assuming his powers to be the result of an electric shock from the mast, Rob learns he can fly and generate energy beams from his hands - one of which inadvertently sets off an explosion. He returns to his girlfriend, a news reporter, who reprimands him for not speaking to her for months, even though Rob wrote to her every week. He reveals his powers to her, and she suggests he don a costume and become a superhero. Since he left a red energy trail behind when he flew, he assumed the guise of The Comet.

In his numerous battles as the Comet, Rob slowly learns to use his powers. He can fly, generate heat beams and force blasts, create a limited forcefield, and even breathe underwater by using his powers to force the water away: he hypothesizes that this traps a bubble of air between him and the water. The Comet is also stronger than a normal human, and considerably tougher, though not invulnerable: shrapnel from a grenade does his arm some damage. Eventually, Rob learns that his powers are the result of his mind being accidentally transferred into the body of shape-shifting aliens that were researching the Earth, disguised as the Connors family. This is the reason for the discontinuity in Rob's memory compared to actual events. He attempts to force the other aliens to free his parents, but fails: they leave, never to return. The hits keep coming, as Rob's original human body is killed by one of the Comet's enemies, in circumstances that make it look like the Comet was responsible. He goes to his girlfriend for help, only to discover that she knew all along, and was in fact the one who sent the aliens to the Connors. In attempting to reveal this story on the news, she breaks the bargain she made with the aliens, and the last of them on the planet kills her. The police attempt to arrest the Comet for the murder of Rob Connors. Rob tries to unmask himself to prove himself blameless, but accidentally accesses his alien shapeshifting ability in his desire to show his face, and morphs into a one-eyed alien monster. Horrified, Rob tears away from the scene, and is apparently killed in an explosion. It is later revealed that he didn't die, but resumed human form and became a baseball player named Jay Cole with no memory of his earlier life.

His true identity is revealed by The Black Hood, and they team up for a while. However, the Tomorrow Men, a group of time-manipulating businessmen, make it look like the Hood was intending to betray the Comet, and in insane rage, the Comet irradiates an entire city. The city is covered over with an immense dome, but the Comet breaks free, intending to kill Jordan, the world's greatest authority on energy control, whom he believes is a threat to him. His attack is foiled by one of the Tomorrow Men, who captures the Comet, intending to steal his energy to power the Tomorrow Men's base. The Comet breaks free, but is sent back to Earth, where the Black Hood is forced, regretfully, to kill him.

== Powers and abilities ==
Comet had the ability to manipulate photonic energy to fire blasts of force, heat, blinding light, and laser beams. He could fly at supersonic speeds, leaving a red energy trail behind him. He could also generate a protective halo of light that could deflect most physical attacks, but could not protect him from heat based attacks (when a robot used a flame thrower on him, his used his halo to block the attack, but he still got mildly burned). He could also shapeshift and was stronger than a normal human.
