= Forbidden Tales of Dark Mansion =

Gothic anthology comic book series

- Forbidden Tales of Dark Mansion #5 (June 1972), the first issue under the new title. Cover art by Nick Cardy.

Publication information
- Publisher: DC Comics
- Schedule: Bimonthly
- Format: Ongoing series
- Genre: Horror, romance
- Publication date: September 1971 – March 1974
- No. of issues: 15
- Main character(s): Charity
- Editor(s): Dorothy Woolfolk, Ethan Mordden, Joe Orlando, E. Nelson Bridwell, Denny O'Neil

Forbidden Tales of Dark Mansion was a Gothic horror-suspense-romance anthology comic book series published by DC Comics from 1971 to 1974, a companion to Secrets of Sinister House. Both series were originally inspired by the successful ABC soap opera, Dark Shadows, which ran from 1966 to 1971.

== Publication history ==
After four issues as The Dark Mansion Of Forbidden Love, the romance angle was abandoned and the title changed to Forbidden Tales of Dark Mansion. Very much in the same vein as House of Mystery and House of Secrets, Forbidden Tales of Dark Mansion was "hosted" by Charity (the character debuted in issue #7).

Originally edited by Dorothy Woolfolk, the title was later overseen by a succession of editors, including Ethan Mordden, Joe Orlando, E. Nelson Bridwell, and Denny O'Neil. Contributors to the title included Jack Oleck, E. Nelson Bridwell, Jack Kirby, Michael William Kaluta, Alfredo Alcala, Jack Sparling, Bill Draut, and Alex Niño.

Forbidden Tales of Dark Mansion was canceled after publishing fifteen issues in three years.

The character of Charity later became part of the supporting cast in the Starman series and at some point after the last issue married the policeman Mason O'Dare and is pregnant with his child.

== See also ==
- Haunted Love
