= Ceasing to Breathe =

Studio album by Still Remains
- Released: December 17, 2013
- Recorded: 2013
- Genre: Metalcore
- Length: 53:28
- Label: Independent, Warner Music Japan
- Producer: Josh Schroeder

Still Remains chronology
The Serpent (2007)	Ceasing to Breathe (2013)

Professional ratings
Review scores
Source	Rating
Sputnik Music	4/5 stars
The PRP	3/5 stars
Indie Vision Music	4/5 stars
HM Magazine	3.5/5 stars

Ceasing to Breathe is the third full-length album by American metalcore band Still Remains.

== Critical reception ==
Robert Garland of Sputnik Music writes: "For all those who see metalcore as a dead or dying subgenre, Still Remains shows hope in the form of bringing back some of their older sounds. Ceasing To Breathe shows an act rising from the ashes." Brody B. from Indie Vision Music says: "Still Remains are back, and what I would say better than ever. Sure they're all grown up now, but I think that tends to add a more polished and complete sound to the band. While they don't bring anything new to the table for the genre, they are able to convince listeners that they are the best at what they do and they have come to take back the throne in the melodic metal scene."

== Track listing ==
No.	Title	Length
1.	"Bare Your Teeth" (Feat. Dan Weydant of Zao)	4:42
2.	"Crone"	5:18
3.	"Beacon"	3:41
4.	"Cain"	4:12
5.	"Close to the Grave"	3:54
6.	"A Way Out"	4:47
7.	"Keeping Secrets"	3:52
8.	"Ceasing to Breathe"	3:33
9.	"F.F.I."	4:02
10.	"Hopeless"	5:41
11.	"Reprise"	5:04
12.	"Bitter Shroud Repentance"	4:42
Total length:		53:28

Japanese Edition Bonus Tracks
No.	Title	Length
13.	"Reading Lips"	4:31
14.	"Checkmate"	3:36
Total length:		61:41

== Credits ==
Still Remains

- T.J. Miller – lead vocals
- Jordan Whelan – guitars
- Mike Church – guitars, clean vocals
- A.J. Barrette – drums
- Zach Roth – keyboards, synthesizers
- Kenny Polidan – bass

Additional Musicians

- Daniel Weydant – guest vocals on track 1
