= Ethan Mordden =

American novelist

- Born: 1947 (age 78–79); Pennsylvania, U.S.
- Education: Friends Academy; University of Pennsylvania
- Occupations: Author; musical theater scholar

Ethan Mordden (born 1947) is an American author and musical theater scholar.

== Early life and education ==
Mordden was born in Pennsylvania and raised in Venice, Italy, and Long Island, New York. He is a graduate of Friends Academy and the University of Pennsylvania. He worked as a music director off-Broadway and in regional theater and enrolled in the BMI Lehman Engel Musical Theatre Workshop.

As both composer and lyricist, Mordden wrote musicals based on William Shakespeare's Measure For Measure and on Max Beerbohm's Zuleika Dobson, but he ultimately ended up working mainly as a prose writer. In the 1970s, he was assistant editor to Dorothy Woolfolk on DC Comics such as The Dark Mansion of Forbidden Love.

== Writing career ==
Mordden, along with Andrew Holleran, Armistead Maupin, Gordon Merrick, and Edmund White, was among the first generation of openly gay authors to have their books considered mainstream rather than "sex writing".

His stories, novels, essays, and non-fiction books cover multiple topics including American musical theater, opera, and film. In his fiction, he wrote about the emergence and development of contemporary American gay culture in New York City. He has also written for The New Yorker, including three works of fiction; Critic At Large pieces on Cole Porter, Judy Garland, and the musical Show Boat; and reviews of a biography of the Barrymores and Art Spiegelman's graphic novel Maus. He later became a book reviewer for The Wall Street Journal.

His best-known fictional works are the interrelated series of stories known collectively as the "Buddies" cycle. In book form, these began with 1985's I have a Feeling We're not in Kansas Anymore. The fifth in the series, 2005's How's Your Romance?, is subtitled Concluding the "Buddies" Cycle. Together, the stories follow a close-knit friend group of men as they grow older.

Mordden's A Bad Man Is Easy to Find, published in 1989 under the pseudonym of M. J. Verlaine, is a series of interrelated short stories about the lives of women. Mordden's 1995 novel How Long Has This Been Going On? follows the lives of a diverse group of men and women from 1949 to 1991 from Los Angeles to San Francisco to the northeastern United States; most of the principal characters are gay or lesbian. Another one of Mordden's works of fiction, The Venice Adriana (1998), is loosely based around the life of soprano Maria Callas. In 2008, Mordden published The Jewcatcher, a surrealistic novel set in Berlin from the end of the Weimar Republic to the last day of World War II. The cast of characters is a combination of Mordden's inventions and real-life figures such as Adolf Hitler, Claus von Stauffenberg, and Johann Wolfgang von Goethe.

In 2012, Mordden published his first volume of gay fiction in eight years, The Passionate Attention of an Interesting Man; in the form of a novella and four short stories, the book explores relationships in which one man dominates another. In 2015, Mordden returned to writing historical fiction with One Day in France, set in Limoges and Oradour-Sur-Glane when the latter is destroyed and its inhabitants brutally murdered by a squad of the Nazi Schutzstaffel. In 2021, Mordden published another novel, You Can't Be Too Young or Too Pretty, a black comedy about a murder cult preying on college students in an unnamed American town.

Mordden's nonfiction includes seven volumes detailing the history of the Broadway musical from the 1920s through the early 2000s, guides to orchestral music and operatic recordings, and a cultural history of the American 1920s entitled That Jazz. He has also published Demented, an examination of the operatic diva, and a coffee table book book on the works of Rodgers and Hammerstein. His 2012 book Love Song is a dual biography chronicling the romance and professional collaboration of Kurt Weill and Lotte Lenya, and in 2013 he published Anything Goes: A History of American Musical Theatre. He has written a number of books on film, including analyses of the influence of the Hollywood studio system and of the role of female film stars.

== Selected bibliography ==
Buddies series

- I Have a Feeling We're Not in Kansas Anymore: Tales from Gay Manhattan, 1985
- Buddies, 1986
- Everybody Loves You: Further Adventures in Gay Manhattan, 1988
- Some Men Are Lookers, 1997
- How's Your Romance?, 2005

Works on Broadway

- Make Believe: the Broadway musical in the 1920s, 1997
- Sing For Your Supper: the Broadway musical in the 1930s, 2005
- Beautiful Mornin': the Broadway musical in the 1940s, 1999
- Coming Up Roses: the Broadway musical in the 1950s, 1998
- Open a New Window: the Broadway musical in the 1960s, 2001
- One More Kiss: the Broadway musical in the 1970s, 2003
- The Happiest Corpse I've Ever Seen: The Last Twenty-Five Years of the Broadway Musical, 2004
- All That Glittered: The Golden Age of Drama on Broadway 1919–1959, 2007
- Gays on Broadway, 2023

Other works on musical theater

- The American Theatre, 1967
- Better Foot Forward: The History of American Musical Theater, 1976
- That Jazz!: An Idiosyncratic Social History of the American Twenties, 1978
- The Hollywood Musical, 1981
- Broadway Babies: The People Who Made the American Musical, 1983
- The Fireside Companion to the Theatre, 1988
- Rodgers & Hammerstein, 1999
- Ziegfeld: The Man Who Invented Show Business, 2008
- Anything Goes: A History of American Musical Theatre, 2013
- On Sondheim: An Opinionated Guide, 2015
- When Broadway Went to Hollywood, 2016
- All That Jazz: The Life and Times of the Musical Chicago, 2018
- On Streisand: An Opinionated Guide, 2019
- Broadway Musicals On CD: A Conversational Guide, 2022

Works on opera and classical music

- Opera in the Twentieth Century: Sacred, Profane, Godot, 1978
- A Guide to Opera Recordings, 1980
- A Guide to Orchestral Music, the Handbook for Non-Musicians, 1980
- The Splendid Art of Opera: A Concise History, 1980
- Demented: The World of the Opera Diva, 1984
- Opera Anecdotes, 1988
- The New Book of Opera Anecdotes, 2020

Works on Hollywood

- Movie Star: A Look at the Women Who Made Hollywood, 1983
- The Hollywood Studios, 1988

Other published works

- Smarts, the Cultural I.Q. Test, 1984
- Pooh's Workout Book, 1984
- How Long Has This Been Going On?, 1995
- The Venice Adriana, 1998
- The Jewcatcher, 2008
- The Guest List: How Manhattan Defined American Sophistication---from the Algonquin Round Table to Truman Capote's Ball, 2010
- Love Song: The Lives of Kurt Weill and Lotte Lenya, 2012
- The Passionate Attention of an Interesting Man, 2013
- One Day in France, 2015
- You Can't Be Too Young or Too Pretty, 2021
- The Blacksmith, 2024
- The Gay Toy Shop, 2025
