= Shade (character) =

- Textless cover of Starman (vol. 2) #6 (April 1994), art by Tony Harris.

Publication information
- Publisher: DC Comics
- First appearance: Flash Comics #33 (September 1942)
- Created by: Gardner Fox; Harold Wilson Sharp

In-story information
- Alter ego: Richard Swift
- Team affiliations: Injustice Society
- Notable aliases: "Dicky" "Mr. Black" "Louie"; Immortal Wielder of Shadows
- Abilities: Shadow manipulation; Shadow generation; Shadow absorption; Shadow construct creation; Shadow demon control; Telepathy; Teleportation; Dimensional travel; Immortality; Intangibility

The Shade (Richard Swift) is a comic book character developed in the 1940s for National Comics, first appearing in the pages of Flash Comics in a story titled "The Man Who Commanded the Night", scripted by Gardner Fox and illustrated by Hal Sharp. Debuting as a villain, the Shade was best known for fighting against two generations of superheroes, most notably the Golden Age and Silver Age versions of the Flash. He eventually became a mentor for Jack Knight, the son of the Golden Age Starman, Ted Knight, a hero the Shade had also fought.

Though portrayed in Silver Age comics as a thief with a cane that could manipulate shadows, the character was reinvented in 1994 as a morally ambiguous Victorian-era immortal who gained the ability to manipulate shadows and immortality from an unexplained mystical event. In 2009, the Shade was ranked as IGN's 89th-greatest villain of all time.

The Shade appeared as a major character from the season 1 finale onwards in Stargirl, played by Jonathan Cake.

== Publication history ==
The Shade first appeared in Flash Comics #33 (September 1942), and was created by Gardner Fox and Harold Sharp.

Shade received a solo series in late 2011, written by Robinson and drawn by Cully Hamner, Darwyn Cooke, Javier Pulido, and others. It deals with Shade and his descendants, flashing back to various points in his life as he travels the globe trying to find who is behind a plot to kill him.

== Fictional character biography ==
The Shade draws his alias from Dante Alighieri's epic poem The Divine Comedy, specifically its first book, Inferno, which provides a classical depiction of Hell and its environs. The description by Dante of the various people he encounters as "the Shade" are references to the perpetual darkness of Hell itself.

=== Pre-Crisis ===
The Shade was introduced in Flash Comics #33, as a villain for the original Flash, Jay Garrick. He was portrayed in his first and only Golden Age appearance as a thief with a machine that caused darkness by removing light-reflecting dust particles; in later Silver Age stories he instead used a magical cane which could manipulate shadows. He fought both Garrick and the second Flash, Barry Allen. He was a member of several supervillain teams, including the Injustice Society. Shade was one of three villains used for the first meeting of the two heroes in the "Flash of Two Worlds" story, which reintroduced the Golden Age Flash to the Silver Age. He was jailed along with the Wizard and the Fiddler.

In the "Crisis on Earth-S" story, King Kull paired Shade up with Doctor Light, Joker of Earth-Two, and Weeper of Earth-S to wipe out humanity on Earth-S. With Doctor Light he causes perpetual night and darkness on either side of the planet, but is met by Bulletman and Hawkman.

=== Post-Crisis ===
The Shade returned in print in 1986, as a member of the Wizard's new incarnation of the Injustice Society. The Shade's next appearance was in a flashback story in Secret Origins #50 (1989), which presented a post-Crisis retelling of "Flash of Two Worlds".

=== Post-Zero Hour ===
After Zero Hour, the Shade's origin was changed drastically; he was retconned to be a 19th-century Englishman named Richard Swift stricken with amnesia after surviving an unexplained mystical tragedy. Swift accepts an offer from a stranger, Piers Ludlow, for shelter while he tries to regain his memories. What he doesn't know is that the entire Ludlow family is in fact a collection of thieves and murderers plotting to kill him. Acting on instinct, Swift unleashes his shadows and slaughters the entire family. Only a young pair of twins, absent from the excursion, survive.

Decades later, Swift is ambushed by Rupert Ludlow, one of the surviving twins, and kills him. He then takes up life as a wandering assassin while indulging his personal interests in history and culture. While traveling, he meets and befriends Brian Savage (Scalphunter) and visits Opal City for the first time. He then decides to settle there and becomes rich from property investments, even encountering Oscar Wilde. During his journeys, he meets a similar immortal born of the same incident and bearing his same powers, a dwarf by the name of Simon Culp, who becomes his mortal enemy.

During all of the Shade's escapades, he is pursued by the Ludlows, whom he kills by the dozens. He is nearly killed by one Ludlow, Marguerite Croft, when he falls in love with her in Paris during the 1930s. She tries to kill Shade with poison but is unsuccessful. When Marguerite admits that she feels no remorse and in fact is already working on more plans to kill him, Shade strikes her down unhesitatingly. The experience changes him permanently, as he realizes that his powers are as much a curse as a blessing, and that he will never truly have the respectable life he wants. Instead, he resumes his former work as an assassin.

During World War II, he leaves America to defend England, and fights Simon Culp again. An exploding bomb causes Culp's body to fuse with that of Shade. Unaware of this, the Shade returns to Keystone City. This was the time of the Golden Age of Heroes, and of them all he chooses Jay Garrick, the first Flash, as his adversary. During this time, Culp is able to subtly affect the Shade's behavior, and was even able to take over Shade's body completely when the latter is tired.

When the Flash retires in the 1950s, a new hero called the Spider takes his place. Shade investigates the Spider's background and discovers he is both a criminal (using his role to get rid of the competition) and a Ludlow by birth. Ludlow's move to Keystone City was part of his plan to kill the Shade. Shade instead kills the Spider, and rescues Flash and his wife from a murder attempt.

During the 1960s, Shade briefly teams up with Doctor Fate to take down one of Culp's criminal ventures, a mystic organization called the Wise Fools, who wished to repeat the ritual that created him by summoning a wild, uncontrolled bubble of shadow (actually Culp's shadow, separated from the Shade by Culp). Unaware that Culp's consciousness is actually within the Shade, he and Dr. Fate destroy the Wise Fools operation and throw the bubble into an empty dimension (where it continues to grow in power and size). This was all part of Culp's larger plan, one which almost culminates in the destruction of Opal City.

=== Starman (vol. 2) ===
James Robinson gave the character a starring role in his new Starman series in 1994. In the first story arc, Sins of the Father, Jack believes Shade to be his enemy when he kidnaps Jack's father, retired Starman Ted Knight, on the orders of the senile Mist, who wishes for a final showdown. Shade later betrays Mist by allying himself with the O'Dare family, a clan of police officers who assist Jack in the memory of their father Billy O'Dare, a policeman who had often assisted the original Starman. Shade, with the O'Dares, assaults Mist's hideout and rescues Ted Knight. Shade befriends the family's "black sheep", Matt O'Dare.

Much of the Shade's past is revealed through journal entries included in the Starman comics, including the flashback issues called "Times Past". They often deal with different Starmen, including Jack's father Ted, as well as other characters from the Starman mythos, such as Brian Savage. There were a total of 10 "Times Past" issues in the 80-issue series. "Excerpts" from the Shade's journal often replaced the Starman letters column, frequently giving additional background related to the story or background into Shade's motivations. These excerpts are written as prose, as opposed to a more traditional comic style, with occasional illustrations, and as journal entries being written by the Shade himself at different points in his existence.

Shade has an active part in an adventure of Jack's involving a demon hidden within a poster that can snatch innocent people and drag them into Hell. Shade does not like Merritt, the human guardian of the poster, who has gained immortality for his protection of it, and was the inspiration for Wilde's The Picture of Dorian Gray. In a fight for possession of the poster, Matt O'Dare is dragged within and Shade follows. Inside the poster, Shade, Jack and Matt separately agree to sell their souls in exchange for the liberation of all the souls contained within. The demon, unable to accept a selfless deal, is forced to release everyone, but takes Merritt's soul instead. Matt decides to turn over a new leaf and put his crooked past behind him. Shade assists him in his efforts, while influenced by the revelation that O'Dare is the reincarnated lawman Scalphunter, who happens to be an old friend.

A particularly important point in the life of Shade comes when he meets the demon-lord Neron. Neron offers, as he has done so with many supervillains before him, to enhance Shade's power. Shade sees little use in Neron's offer, as he has no need to increase his already substantial wealth, sees no way of heightening his shadows' power, and is already immortal. Neron, angered by his rejection, swears vengeance against Shade.

Over the years, the Ludlow attacks have dwindled. This lasts until the wife of the last Ludlow calls him to talk her husband out of attempting an attack that would certainly cost him his life. Shade talks Ludlow out of pursuing his family's vendetta, burying a legacy of hate that has lasted more than 150 years.

Another notable point during the series' run came when the Godwave struck the DC universe, depowering almost all superheroes. In a confrontation between Starman, Matt O'Dare, Green Lantern, and the Infernal Doctor Pip, Pip almost blows up a large section of an Opal skyscraper, but Shade appears at the last minute and draws Pip into the Darklands, which serve as his power source, before the bomb can explode.

At various times, Culp is able to take control over or subtly influence Shade. At one point, Culp takes full control to talk to Jack, in the process making a mistake about the name of a Oscar Wilde story. Around the time Jack returns from space in the "Stars, My Destination" story arc, Culp is able to assume full control over Shade's body for an extended period of time and imprison or neutralize most of Opal City's heroes in a bid to loot and destroy Opal - with seemingly no motive other than to destroy what Shade loves most. Gathering an army of villains whom Jack has battled over the course of the series, Culp absorbs Shade's powers, in addition to the shadow force Shade and Dr. Fate had exiled decades before, to cast a spell allowing him to trap Opal City in an impenetrable bubble of shadow and force a confrontation with the city's heroes. Many of the supervillains helping Culp have been gathered by either Neron, the still-vengeful daughter of Mist, or one of the last Ludlows in existence: the son of the false hero the Spider. This story is the climax of the series, told in the "Grand Guignol" story arc.

Shade eventually is able to cast out Culp, while losing his shadow powers in the process. However, Culp underestimates the Shade and is tricked into allowing a small shadow imp loyal to Shade to be absorbed into his own shadow, leading to a battle of wills in which Shade draws all the darkness into himself, leaving Culp powerless. Culp attempts to buy his freedom by threatening the younger Mist but is killed by the elder Mist. With his enemies vanquished, the Shade is now uncertain of his future. He is present at the final showdown with Mist and leaves the building with Ralph Dibny, Jack and Theo Kyle Knight.

=== Post-Starman (vol. 2) ===
Since the end of the Starman (vol. 2) series, the Shade has made cameo appearances in several comic series, including Green Arrow and JSA and was listed alongside magical-based villains such as Felix Faust and Circe. He also has a brief appearance in DC's Brave New World in 2006. During the Infinite Crisis, he is seen using his powers to help Opal citizens by protecting the buildings they are in.

He shows up in Robinson's Justice League: Cry for Justice, waiting for his old rival Jay Garrick in his home. He informs Garrick that the insane supervillain Prometheus has ordered a series of attacks on various superheroes (including Batwoman, Barry Allen, Crimson Avenger, and Stargirl) to distract them from a sinister master plan. Shade accompanies Jay to the JLA Watchtower to warn the other heroes of the impending doom. He and Jay arrive at the Watchtower just as Prometheus (who had disguised himself as Freddy Freeman and defeated the entire League) attempts to escape. Though Jay is easily floored, the Shade proves difficult to defeat, and ultimately ends up stopping Donna Troy from killing the supervillain after he has been beaten into submission. The Shade later creates a portal that gives Green Arrow access to Prometheus' otherdimensional lair, where the archer kills Prometheus in revenge for Star City, the dismemberment of his former protege Red Arrow, and the death of Red Arrow's daughter Lian Harper.

During the Blackest Night storyline, Shade is in a relationship with Hope O'Dare, and claims that he is in love with her. After a night of sex, Shade and Hope are confronted by David Knight, reanimated as a Black Lantern. David rips out Shade's heart, but, due to his powers, he survives as he is unable to be killed, which allows Shade to resist the call of a black ring that seeks to turn him into another undead Lantern. After David threatens to kill Hope and later Jack, an enraged Shade uses his powers to trap the Black Lantern within the Shadowlands after decrying the Lantern as a mockery and a fake, saying he has "no light of his own", and uses his own heart as a channel to bind and banish him. Afterwards, Hope admits that she loves Shade as well, and they depart from the scene of the battle.

Shortly after the events of "Blackest Night", the Shade is approached by Hal Jordan and Barry Allen, and he takes them to the Ghost Zone where they find the rotting corpse of Prometheus.

During Brightest Day, Jay Garrick arrives at the Shade's home with Doctor Mid-Nite, Sebastian Faust, and Wildcat to enlist his help in tracking down the missing Obsidian, who possesses abilities similar to those of the Shade. After entering the house, the JSA members find Obsidian and Doctor Fate standing over the Shade's comatose body. Obsidian, now possessed by a cosmic entity known as the Starheart, tells the heroes that the Shade would have told them his "secrets", and that the Starheart commanded that he and Fate silence him. Following the defeat of the Starheart, Congorilla mentions that the Shade has been missing since his assault at the hands of Obsidian, and that nobody has been able to contact him.

Shade's disappearance is explained shortly after this, when it is revealed that he had been captured and brainwashed by Eclipso. Realizing that Shade could turn the tide of the battle, Saint Walker sends the Atom and Starman inside his body to fight off the effects of Eclipso's brainwashing. The heroes narrowly manage to free the Shade's mind, and he turns against Eclipso and ultimately helps the Justice League defeat the villain once and for all.

=== The New 52 ===
In September 2011, The New 52 rebooted DC's continuity. In this new timeline, a 12-issue series has the Shade survive an assassination attempt, then travel the world to uncover the people behind it. Along the way he deals with his past before the shadows, as well as the encounters he had with his descendants through the years. It is also explained how he first met Culp, and exactly how he gained the shadow powers.

=== DC Rebirth ===
In 2016, DC Comics implemented a relaunch of its books called "DC Rebirth", which restored its continuity to a form much as it was prior to "The New 52". Iris West, Barry Allen and Ace West get sucked into the Shadowlands. Separated from Iris, Barry and Wally meet up with the Shade, who reveals he has lost control of his shadows. His shadows have also kidnapped Hope, and both she and Iris are corrupted by the Shade's darkness. The Flashes and Shade are able to free Hope and Iris from the shadows, with the Shade regaining his powers as well as reconciling with Hope O'Dare.

=== Possible futures ===
During the Starman story arc "Stars, My Destination", Jack Knight is thrown by a shadowy corridor created by a future Shade across time and space into a future where Shade's powers overtake him due to a disease that Culp had infected him with during their final battle. His shadow begins expanding into the universe and threatens areas protected by the Legion of Super-Heroes. Rescuing him, the future Shade explains how Jack may be able to stop it from ever happening by using his cosmic rod on him in the past. He later opens another time portal to allow Jack to journey across time again to reach his destination, Throneworld.

Starman Annual #1 shows a possible future for Shade as the protector of a Utopian planet thousands of years from the present. As with the current Shade, he enjoys telling tales of his past. The planet's technology and possibly the planet itself seemed to be made almost entirely out of Cosmic Rod technology inspired by Starman and his legacy.

== Powers and abilities ==
Shade can channel the power of the Shadowlands, which is a partially sentient, extra-dimensional mass of malleable darkness. He can use it for many effects, both as an absence of light and a solid substance: he can summon and control "demons", project as shields and conjure areas of complete darkness, create all kinds of constructs out of shadows, transport himself and others through it over great distances, and can use it as a prison dimension. The darkness itself can be dispelled by sufficiently bright blasts of light or energy. Eventually, his experience with the shadows allows him to create corridors through time. The shadows have also granted Shade agelessness and immortality. Dr. Fate once remarked that even the Spectre would have serious difficulty dealing with the Shade, possibly due to the origin of his powers (the former realm of a divine entity on par with God). He is heavily resistant to damage, as seen when a demolition bomb falls on him, leaving him only slightly dazed. Even with his heart torn out of his chest by Black Lantern David Knight, he remained alive and unable to die.

His only weakness is that if he loses his shadow, he becomes vulnerable. However, this can only occur if a survivor from the same event in 1838 drains him of it, or in the event of a light strong enough to completely surround him to the point that he is unable to cast a shadow. Prometheus was briefly able to stun Shade with a brief burst of light.

== Other versions ==
- An alternate universe version of Shade from Earth-33 appears in Countdown to Adventure as a member of the League of Shamans.
- A gender-flipped version of Shade from an unspecified universe appears in Countdown: Arena #1.
- Shade appears in DC x Sonic the Hedgehog: Metal Legion,. He makes a cameo in the third issue, where he and Ares encounter Zor of the Deadly Six.

== In other media ==
=== Television ===
- The Shade, based on the Silver Age comics incarnation, appears in series set in the DC Animated Universe (DCAU), voiced by Stephen McHattie.
  - Shade first appears in Justice League as a member of Lex Luthor and Aresia's Injustice Gangs and Gorilla Grodd's Secret Society.
  - In Justice League Unlimited, Shade makes non-speaking appearances as a member of Grodd's new Secret Society, which is later taken over by Luthor. When Grodd mounts a mutiny to retake control, Shade sides with him, only to be trapped in ice by Killer Frost and apparently killed by Darkseid along with most of the Society.
- Shade appears in Young Justice, voiced by Joel Swetow. In the episode "Triptych", he unwillingly partakes in Simon Stagg's metahuman trafficking operation until Cheshire frees him. Shade later joins the League of Shadows, but leaves them out of gratitude to Cheshire and goes freelance.
- An unidentified, original incarnation of the Shade appears in a self-titled episode of The Flash, portrayed by Mike McLeod.
- The Shade appears in Stargirl, portrayed by an uncredited actor in the first season and by Jonathan Cake in the second and third seasons. This version was originally a thief, con artist, and member of the Men of Tears cabal in the 1800s who gained his powers from a botched ritual meant to summon Eclipso. By the end of the 20th century, he joined the Injustice Society of America (ISA) as part of a "temporary arrangement" despite viewing its leader Icicle as insane. In the present, he comes to Blue Valley in search of Eclipso's Black Diamond and becomes an ally of Stargirl and her Justice Society of America.

=== Video games ===
- The Shade appears as a character summon in Scribblenauts Unmasked: A DC Comics Adventure.
- The Shade appears as a playable character in Lego DC Super-Villains, voiced by Christopher Swindle.
