= BLIS/COBOL =

- Written in: COBOL
- Working state: Historic
- Supported platforms: Data General Nova and Data General Eclipse 16-bit minicomputers

BLIS/COBOL is a discontinued operating system that was written in COBOL. It was optimised to compile business applications written in COBOL. BLIS was available on a range of Data General Nova and Data General Eclipse 16-bit minicomputers. It was marketed by Information Processing, Inc. (IPI), who regularly exhibited the product at the National Computer Conference in the 1970s and 80s. It was priced between US$830 and $10,000 depending on the number of supported users and features. In 1977, IPI boasted over 100 operational installations of the system worldwide.

By 1985, a version for the IBM PC existed called PC-BLIS.

Originally, most operating systems were written in assembly language for a particular processor or family of processors. Non-assembler operating systems were comparatively slow, but were easier for revision and repair. One of the reasons for the C programming language's low-level features, which resemble assembly language in some ways, is an early intent to use it for writing operating systems. Similar goals led to IBM's development of PL/S. The high-level nature of COBOL, which created some problems for operating system development, was partially addressed in BLIS, since it was deliberately optimized for COBOL.
