= Of Love and Lunacy =

Studio album by Still Remains
- Released: May 3, 2005
- Recorded: The Farm, Gibsons, British Columbia; The Warehouse, Vancouver, British Columbia; Azymuth, Carmel, Indiana
- Genre: Metalcore
- Length: 50:03
- Label: Roadrunner
- Producer: GGGarth

Still Remains chronology
If Love Was Born to Die (2004)	Of Love and Lunacy (2005)	The Serpent (2007)

Professional ratings
Review scores
Source	Rating
Allmusic	3.5/5 stars
Jesus Freak Hideout	4.5/5 stars
Metalbite	4.5/5 stars

Of Love and Lunacy is the third release and debut studio album by the metalcore band Still Remains. It was released on May 3, 2005, via Roadrunner Records. The song "The Worst Is Yet to Come" was the album's lead single.

== Track listing ==
1. "To Live and Die by Fire" – 2:57
2. "The Worst Is Yet to Come" – 3:50
3. "In Place of Hope" – 4:49
4. "White Walls" – 4:28
5. "Bliss" – 3:37
6. "Cherished" – 4:27
7. "With What You Have" – 1:19
8. "Kelsey" – 3:13
9. "Recovery" – 5:16
10. "I Can Revive Him with My Own Hands" – 4:42
11. "Stare and Wonder" – 5:36
12. "Blossom, the Witch" – 5:34
13. "Bed of Nails" (Japanese bonus track) – 3:53
14. "Head Like a Hole" (iTunes bonus track) [Nine Inch Nails cover] - 5:12

== Personnel ==
- T.J. Miller – lead vocals
- Mike Church – guitar and clean vocals
- Jordan Whelan – guitar
- Evan Willey – bass guitar
- Zach Roth – keyboards
- A.J. Barrette – drums
- Gggarth – producer
- Josh Wilbur – mixer
