= JLA: Age of Wonder =

Comics mini-series

Publication information
- Publisher: Elseworlds (DC Comics)
- Schedule: Monthly
- Format: Limited series
- Genre: Steampunk, superhero
- Publication date: 2003
- No. of issues: 2

Creative team
- Written by: Adisakdi Tantimedh
- Penciller(s): P. Craig Russell; Galen Showman
- Inker: Galen Showman
- Letterer: Bob Lappan
- Colorist: Dave McCaig
- Editor(s): Andy Helfer; Harvey Richards

JLA: Age of Wonder is a 2003 two-issue miniseries of comics from DC's Elseworlds imprint. Taking place from 1876 to 1913, the comics follow Clark Kent and Lex Luthor as they use superpowers to create technical innovations, leading to the establishment of the "League of Science" and its attempts to reshape the course of human history. The series was written by Adisakdi Tantimedh, with art by P. Craig Russell and Galen Showman.

== Plot ==
=== Issue one ===
During the 1876 Philadelphia Centennial Exposition, Lois Lane, the first female reporter for the Daily Planet, conducts an interview with Lex Luthor, an aspiring young businessman. Luthor tells Lane about his partnership with Thomas Edison's company to create bold new inventions. Luthor is interrupted mid-sentence by a spectacle which amasses many guests: a flying man is carrying the Torch of the Statue of Liberty for the exposition. The flying man introduces himself to the onlookers as Clark Kent and declares his intention to help people with his "gifts". Lois encourages Luthor to offer Kent a chance to work with him and Edison. Before Luthor can give an answer, Clark accepts and flies to Edison's compound at Menlo Park, New Jersey.

At the compound, Edison is initially unwilling to hire Kent until the young man turns a handful of sand into a glass lightbulb. After impressing a colleague named Nikola Tesla with his workload, Kent learns that Edison forces everyone who works for him to submit his name as credit for their work. Tesla expresses confusion as to why someone as powerful as Kent would not use his powers for personal gain. Clark explains that he has no interest in fame or fortune, only to help others; by contrast, Luthor is influenced by Edison and vows to become a man of wealth and power.

Tesla, Luthor, and Kent switch employers to George Westinghouse after Edison refuses to adopt Tesla's designs for alternating current electricity. Calling himself "Superman", Clark works alongside Luthor to build an experimental hydroelectric power station at Niagara Falls. Lois is assigned to report on their work. Luthor claims the future belongs to those who control the marketing and sale of inventions, like himself. He arranges a press conference to show off his project, leading to Lois being knocked over the side of the falls and rescued by Clark.

Inspired by his rescue of Lois, Clark fashions a costume and begins performing small acts of heroism and charity. His parents then reveal to him that he is not a man, but an alien, when they reveal that beneath their barn is a preserved spacecraft that they found him in.

Kent shows the spaceship to Luthor, Tesla, and his coworkers, Ted Knight and Barry Allen. He tells them about his alien origins and shows them a hologram of his birth world and its destruction. Luthor convinces Clark to let him extract the ship's technology and replicate it. He founds the "Luthor Company" and brings the three men on as partners.

Ted Knight becomes "Starman" in the process of field testing a "gravity rod" during a thunderstorm. Knight tests the rod's energy on Kent, but the energy ricochets onto Barry Allen's experiment, causing the chemicals present to explode. Allen, unharmed, begins cleaning the mess with superhuman speed, thus becoming the "Human Flash".

Lane reports to publisher Perry White that the Luthor Company is giving away cold wireless lamps for free, but when the stocks of these lamps are exhausted, a riot breaks out. Luthor and Kent argue when the former blames the latter for bringing them bad publicity with charitable giveaways. Kent later expresses regret to Lane over his responsibility in the riots, and Lane kisses him.

By 1897, America has become a technologically advanced nation. Kent is hosting the inauguration of the "League of Science", with himself, Knight, and Allen as members. Marine Captain Hal Jordan, having been named Green Lantern of Earth on Kent's recommendation, accepts an offer to join the League but disparages Clark and his keynote speech as naive. During the party, Kent meets the Wayne family and their son, Bruce. Luthor proposes to Lane, who rejects him in favor of Kent. Kent and Lane marry within the year.

Luthor falls ill with radiation poisoning (causing him to lose his hair) during a mountain expedition. He sends a distress signal, and the League evacuates the crew and destroys the cargo. While in hospital, Luthor meets with Tesla, who assures him that a prototype of their project will be completed soon. Kent, who is arriving to visit his friend, overhears that the two are building a death ray. Clark and Lane pressure Luthor to abandon the project, but he is not convinced.

The League of Science meets in 1900, discussing how their charter prohibits weapons based on their scientific sources. The charter also prohibits League members from using their powers in political disputes, including in military ventures. Jordan, who participated in a foreign war despite resigning from the military, defends his actions and calls his colleagues unrealistic. He argues that the charter should be changed, as their inventions have given nations a new reason to fight wars. Kent adjourns the meeting and leaves, but Luthor and Jordan stay and agree that America's interests must be protected. The next day, the Waynes are killed in a bombing, leaving only Bruce alive. The League discovers that a working-class terrorist group called the Spartans is responsible, and they go to the Lower East Side to find their headquarters.

The League finds the Spartan's headquarters deserted and are attacked by the vigilante Green Arrow who summons a mob of angry citizens impoverished by the League's building efforts. Green Arrow declares himself their champion and dismisses the League, but he agrees with Clark that the Spartans cannot be condoned for the deaths of the Wayne family and promises to capture them.

That night, Kent and Lane meet Jordan, who says there is trouble on the moon. Upon arriving to find nothing amiss, Jordan turns on Kent and uses his ring to open an interdimensional portal and force Superman into it. On Earth, he tells the League and Lois that Kent died in space, and his body cannot be recovered. Lane breaks down in tears.

The issue ends with the nation mourning Superman's death. A distraught Lane lies in her living room, and Luthor knocks on her door to court her.

=== Issue two ===
Ten years after the events of issue one, America has become the most technologically advanced civilization on Earth. As a result, World War I occurred years earlier than in the prime timeline.

The Green Arrow is killed while chasing two bank robbers to a warehouse facility. After the struggle, which results in the explosion of the facility, a woman emerges from the rubble unharmed and flies away. The League of Science, including its newest members Plastic Man and Ray Palmer, investigate. At the scene, they are joined by Batman, who suggests they focus on finding the flying woman.

Meanwhile, recent U.S. Secretary of Defense appointee Lex Luthor is enraged by the destruction of the warehouse, which he owned. He meets with Diana of Themyscira, who is dismayed that no one could be rescued from the warehouse; Luthor assures her that all will be okay. He promises that her mother and Amazon sisters will be free from German tyranny soon. Meanwhile, Bruce Wayne discovers that Luthor's holding company owns the destroyed warehouse and concludes that Luthor is up to something.

In New York City, the League attends a charity event hosted by Bruce Wayne concerning the war in Europe. Princess Diana talks about the plight of the Amazons and their enslavement by Germany, and thanks America's role in supporting Themyscira. Lois Lane interviews the President and Luthor, who have opposing views about America's involvement in the war. Meanwhile, Wayne learns of Diana's involvement with Luthor. She demonstrates her powers to Wayne using Ted Knight's cosmic rod, and he becomes interested in her invulnerability.

When General Hal Jordan discovers the Germans possess highly advanced weaponry, and sees British forces being slaughtered in a hopeless fight, he steps in and, despite the Germans knowing the ring's weakness, defeats them. He is recalled back to the United States and is reprimanded by Luthor for breaking America's neutrality but instead is more concerned with the Germans' possession of technology and knowledge only he and Luthor know about. Luthor admits to supplying the Germans with weapons, stating that his plan is to weaken Europe with war while construction of the Death Ray is completed. He wants to force Germany's surrender with the ray, become an American hero, and become president.

Soon afterwards, London is bombed in a nuclear attack, killing 200,000 people including the royal family and destroying Parliament. Jordan attacks Luthor, but is stopped by Diana. Luthor fatally wounds Jordan with a fire axe, and as he lays dying, Jordan commands the Green Lantern ring to find Superman. The ring soon finds Clark Kent, who has been living for years on an asteroid satellite deep in space.

America has formally declared war on Germany, and the League of Science is overwhelmed while providing humanitarian relief to the survivors of London. Barry Allen and Lois Lane are particularly affected by how inventions meant to bring innovation and good to the world have only invited death and destruction. The League notices a green streak of light, and discover Clark Kent wielding Jordan's power ring. Alongside Kent, the League prepares to stop the Germans from launching any more nuclear rockets.

Luthor discovers that Superman has returned and prepares to meet with Tesla to continue their plans. Diana, ridden with guilt over London's destruction, refuses to go. On his way to Wardenclyffe, Luthor contacts Bismarck to launch the rockets in three hours as part of his plan.

Diana is confronted by Batman. She reveals everything to him about Luthor's plans, and promises to lead him to the death ray. Batman recommends that is time for her to redeem herself. At Wardenclyffe, Luthor finds the death ray is fully operational, and Tesla wants to see his work in action. They are stopped by Batman and Diana, who inform Luthor that the President has issued a warrant for his arrest. Luthor tells them that if he is stopped, he will not be able to use the death ray to destroy rockets heading toward New York City.

In Germany, the League manages to capture the rocket base. Superman finds one of the rockets heading off course toward New York City. Luthor gives the order to shoot the rocket, but is informed it is slowing down. Superman stops the missile with his power ring and redirects it toward space. Luthor destroys the other rocket before aiming the death ray toward Superman. Meanwhile, Diana and Batman have Tesla evacuate the building. Diana is killed destroying the death ray. Luthor is arrested and sentenced to death.

In 1913, Superman announces the creation of the Justice League of Nations, a neutral zone where countries could settle disputes diplomatically. To ensure the League's trust, he places Jordan's power ring inside of a battery to be used by the Justice League of Nations to stop any nation from committing an act of aggression against another. After the inauguration, Superman and Lois Lane fly away to catch up on lost time. Meanwhile, newspapers read of Lex Luthor's execution.

== See also ==
- List of Elseworlds publications
- Nikola Tesla in popular culture
- Thomas Edison in popular culture
