= Mist (comics) =

Mist is the name of several DC Comics supervillains who are archenemies of the original and 1990s Starman. The first Mist is a man named Kyle, and the second Mist is his daughter Nash.

Kyle made his live-action debut on the first season of The Flash, portrayed by Anthony Carrigan.

== Publication history ==
The Kyle incarnation of Mist first appeared in Adventure Comics #67 (October 1941), and was created by Gardner Fox.

The Nash version of Mist first appeared in Starman (vol. 2) #0 (October 1994), and was created by writer James Robinson and Tony Harris.

== Fictional character biography ==
=== Kyle ===
Mist

Publication information
- Publisher: DC Comics
- First appearance: Adventure Comics #67 (October 1941)
- Created by: Gardner Fox

In-story information
- Alter ego: Kyle
- Species: Metahuman
- Team affiliations: Injustice Society; Secret Society of Super Villains
- Notable aliases: Johnathon Smythe; Nimbus
- Abilities: Able to transform into a living vapor, becoming tangible and intangible at will

The first Mist, Kyle, fought in World War I as a captain in the Canadian Army, receiving a Victoria Cross. Kyle later created a device that turned his body into a gaseous form; he became a supervillain, first fighting Sandman under the name Johnathon Smythe before becoming known as Mist. In 1941, he undertook a crime wave in Opal City and was stopped by Ted Knight, the Golden Age Starman; he vowed revenge on Starman and became his nemesis.

Mist is a member of Ultra-Humanite's incarnation of the Secret Society of Super Villains, and appears during the late 1980s Starman series under the alias Nimbus.

After Ted Knight retires, Mist plans his final revenge on Starman and sends his son, Kyle Jr., to kill Knight's son David, as well as nearly killing his second son, Jack, demolishing his home and kidnapping the elder Knight. In exchange for his father, Jack battles Kyle Jr., resulting in Kyle Jr.'s death. Mist is driven insane until he makes a deal with Neron to restore his sanity.

Mist grows tired of life and forms a plan to kill himself, planting a nuclear bomb in Opal City set to detonate at the moment of his death. However, he fails to destroy the city and is thwarted by Ted Knight. Starman and Mist make peace with each other just before Mist's heart stops, killing them both.

=== Nash ===
Nash is the daughter of the original Mist. During her father's campaign of revenge against Ted Knight, Nash is given the opportunity to kill Jack Knight, but lets him go after he reasons that she has no personal reason to kill him. After Jack kills Kyle Jr., Nash undergoes a major personality shift and became the second Mist, exposing herself to the same process that had given her father his powers. During her first major crime wave, Nash drugs and rapes Jack, becoming pregnant. She later gave birth to a son, Kyle Theo, named after her father and Jack. Nash passes on a second opportunity to kill Jack, deciding to better herself as a villain while Jack worked to become a better hero.

Nash is among the villains who participate in the plan to destroy Opal City during the "Grand Guignol" story arc. After this fails, her father makes his own attempt to destroy the city. Since his plan would kill Nash and her son, she attempts to stop her father, but is shot and killed by him. Before dying, Nash entrusts Kyle to Jack.

=== Kyle Knight ===
The son of Nash and Jack Knight, Kyle Knight inherited his mother's mist powers and embraced his father's heroic background.

In the series "The New Golden Age", Kyle is stated to be five years old in the present. In the possible future that Huntress originates from, Kyle assumes the Mist identity and joins the Justice Society of America.

== Powers and abilities ==
Both Mists are able to transform into a living vapor and become tangible and intangible at will.

== Other versions ==
=== Earth-Two ===
The Earth-Two version of Mist is an ally of a gang of hoodlums in Park City. With his secret formulas and gadgetry, Mist controls Dinah Drake Lance and other citizens, forcing them to give up their money. Larry Lance, Lance's husband, uncovers the connection between those robbed and his wife's flower shop. Starman accidentally intercepts one of Mist's hypnotic waves and helps the Lances stop Mist.

=== Earth 2 ===
An alternate universe version of Kyle Nimbus / Mist appears in Earth 2: Society. This version is the CEO of Nimbus Solutions who can become intangible.

== In other media ==
- The Kyle incarnation of Mist appears in The Flash, portrayed by Anthony Carrigan. This version is a mob hitman named Kyle Nimbus who was betrayed by and testified against his employers. After being charged, he was put on death row. As Nimbus was being executed via gas chamber, he was caught in the explosion of S.T.A.R. Labs' particle accelerator, giving him the ability to transform into the gas that was being used to execute him.
- An original incarnation of Mist based on Kyle and Nash, Andrea "Andie" Murphy, appears in Young Justice, voiced by Daniela Bobadilla. This version is a reluctant teenage criminal and associate of Livewire and Shade who reluctantly participates in a metahuman trafficking operation before she is subdued by Nightwing, given residence at the Metahuman Youth Center, and eventually joins the Team.
- The Kyle incarnation of Mist appears in My Adventures with Superman, voiced by Lucas Grabeel. This version is a member of Intergang and the brother of leading member Silver Banshee whose abilities are derived from Kryptonian technology.
