= Bliss (British band) =

British pop group

- Origin: Coventry, England
- Genres: Pop; Electronica
- Years active: 1986–1991, 2007–present
- Label: Parlophone Records

Bliss is a British pop group that originated in Coventry, England, in 1986. Founded by Rachel Morrison on vocals and Paul Ralphes on bass, the group established itself within the music scene with its distinctive sound and live performances. Their discography includes albums such as 'Love Prayer' and 'Change in the Weather,' which garnered attention both domestically and internationally. Notable chart success was achieved, particularly in Italy, Germany, and Brazil, with hit singles like 'I Hear You Call' and 'How Do You Feel…the Morning After.' After a hiatus, the original members reunited in 2006, releasing a 'Best of Bliss' compilation in Germany in 2007, featuring both classic tracks and new material.

== Biography ==
Bliss was founded in 1986 by vocalist Rachel Morrison and bassist Paul Ralphes, who were the primary songwriters. In 1987 they released two singles on the label Survival, "I Hear You Call" and "Your Love Meant Everything". Between March and September 1988 the quintet recorded their debut album, Loveprayer, which was released through Parlophone/EMI in 1989 and which also featured a number of session musicians. Loveprayer failed to make an impact in the U.S. and the UK, but saw success in Europe, Brazil, Australia, and New Zealand.

By the time they recorded their sophomore effort, 1991's A Change in the Weather, Tommy Schmieder had taken over on guitar and Michael Witzel on drums. A Change in the Weather was produced by Rupert Hine and featured guest appearances from Paul Carrack and Liam O'Maonlai from Hothouse Flowers. Following this, the group toured with Van Morrison, Chris Isaak, and The Neville Brothers. Soon after the release of A Change in the Weather, Morrison left the group to care for a newborn child. Ralphes moved to Brazil to pursue a career in production.

Morrison and her husband Tommy Schmieder (who performed as Tom E. Morrison) began touring together, with Rachel billing as a solo artist. Rachel and Tom then formed an electronica project called Meeker, which released several singles in 2000–2001 and the album Deep Pools of Light in 2004. They toured under this name and their music was featured on soundtracks to movies like The Tuxedo, Sparkle, and London to Brighton.

After meeting up again with original band member Paul Ralphes in winter 2006, the idea to re-form Bliss took shape and the German record label Zounds eventually released a "Best Of" album called Spirit Of Man including both previously published and new material, in 2007. At the same time, the Bliss back-catalog of recordings done with EMI was digitally released internationally.

Today, Bliss continue to perform with a new line-up consisting of Rachel Morrison (vocals), Tom E Morrison (guitars), Simon Peter (keyboards), Rob Tree (bass), Marc Layton-Bennett (drums/percussion). This line-up, under the Rachel Morrison solo name, recorded an album of covers in the fashionable "Celtic" style released under the title "The Celtic Woman" which also includes three tracks by others. The fifteen Morrison tracks range from versions of songs by Enya, The Cranberries and All About Eve to more "standard" covers of songs by Barbra Streisand, Dolly Parton and R.E.M. The album has been released as one of a double CD set in 2008 called Simply Celtic Moods by Union Square Music (number SIMPLYCD009) and shows this singer's versatility to good effect.

In 2009 Bliss released their third studio album: My World Your World. The album has been described as a celebration of diverse earthy and ethereal moods, and also features covers of Paul Weller's "You Do Something To Me" and Captain Beefheart's "Further Than We've Gone".

== Members ==
- Rachel Morrison – vocals
- Tom E. Morrison – guitar, keyboards, bass, percussions
- Simon Peter – keyboards
- Rob Tree – bass
- Marc Layton-Bennett – drums, percussions
- Paul Ralphes – bass
- Chris Baker – drums
- Paul Sirett – guitar
- Roger Askew – Hammond organ
- Tommy Schmieder – guitar
- Michael Witzel – drums

== Discography ==
=== Bliss ===
Albums

- Loveprayer (Parlophone, 1989)
- A Change in the Weather (Parlophone, 1991)
- Best - Spirit of Man (Zounds, 2006)
- My World Your World (Big Sky Song Records, India-media Records, 2009)

Singles

- "I Hear You Call" – January 1989
- "Won't Let Go" – April 1989
- "How Does it Feel the Morning After" – July 1989
- "Watching Over Me" – March 1991
- "Crash Into the Ocean" – June 1991
- "I Don't Want to Hurry" – September 1991
- "Believe" – January 2006
- "Mercy" – January 2007

=== Rachel Morrison (solo) ===
Albums

- Live at Phoenix (CD album) – 1993 (World of Music)
- Rachel Morrison (Live – CD album) – 1995 (Anderland/Rough Trade)
- yeah! (E.P.) – January 1996 (World of Music)
- Liberty (CD studio album) – 1998 (BMG/Ariola)
- The Celtic Woman (15 tracks of 18 in total, 3 by other artists – see above) – 2007 (Union Square)

Singles

- "Promise" (CD single) – 1996
- "The Sun Won't Come Down" (CD single) – 1998 (BMG/Ariola)
- "Hey Now (Everything's Gonna Be Alright)" (CD single) – 1998 (BMG/Ariola)

=== Meeker ===
Albums

- Deep Pools of Light (CD album) – 2004 (Soundology)

Singles

- "Save Me" – 2000 (Underwater)
- "Mountains" – March 2001 (Underwater)
- "Let's Come Together" – Autumn 2001 (Underwater)
