= Bliss (video game) =

2005 computer game by Games for Loving

Bliss: The Game for Lovers
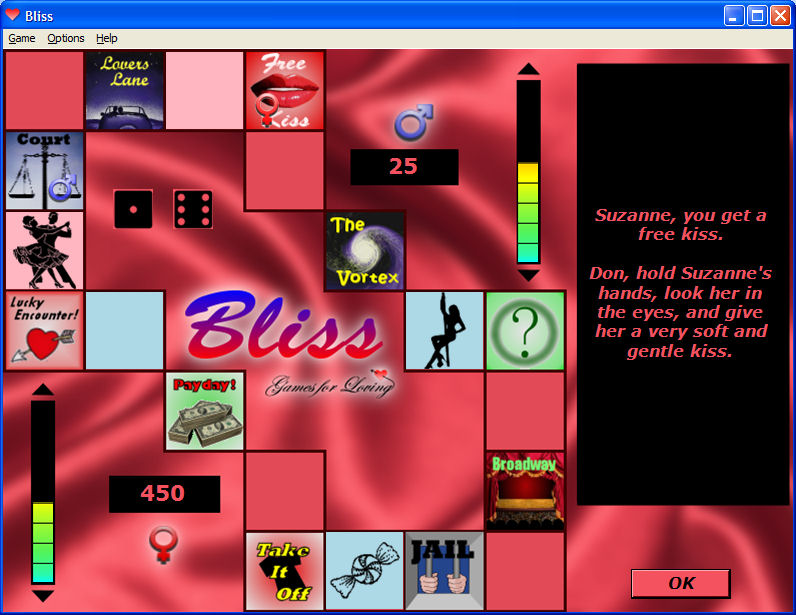
- Screenshot
- Developer: Games for Loving
- Publisher: Games for Loving
- Platforms: Android, Linux, Mac OS X, Windows (all Java supported)
- Release: November 10, 2005
- Genre: Erotic
- Mode: Multiplayer

Bliss: The Game for Lovers is a 2005 video game from American independent software publisher Games for Loving

== Gameplay ==
Bliss is intended to be played in bed with a sexual partner. Bliss, which is loosely based on the board game Monopoly, guides its players through various sexual activities including removing their clothing.

When a game of Bliss is started, the users are asked to supply information about themselves and their environment. This information includes what toys are available (such as Ice Cubes, a Vibrator, etc.) what they are each wearing (in detail), and their current mood, which the game calls a Passion Level. Players can also create and edit Profiles, in which they can specify what types of sexual activities they do or do not like to participate in.

Once the game is started, players take turns rolling the dice, moving around the board, and performing actions as specified by the game. Each turn, the game selects an Action for the player to do. Actions vary from talking to stripping, dancing, and other explicit sexual activities. Occasionally, a player will be told to remove an item of clothing that they are wearing.

Music is a significant part of the game, and plays softly throughout. However, certain Actions allow the user to select a song to be played for the duration of that action. Music is commonly used for actions involving stripping or dancing. Players are encouraged to enhance or replace the music supplied with the game with their own favorite music.

As the game proceeds, each player's Passion Level slowly increases, which allows more explicit actions to be played. At the beginning of the game actions are likely to involve talking, hugging, or soft kisses. Later on in the game, the actions will involve intimate physical contact.

An Action Editor is available at extra cost which allows players to create their own actions for the game or edit the ones that are supplied with the game. There are also available Add On Packs that can be used to change the feel of the game by adding new actions to the mix.

== Reception ==
Public Reaction to Bliss has been mixed. Bliss is promoted by its publisher as a romance game, not as a sex game. As a result, the game includes no pornography or other pictures of people. This distinguishes it somewhat from other similar games. This emphasis has caused the game to be positively received by several pro-family and even Christian web sites.

Wired.com reviewed Bliss favorably in their Sex Drive column.
