= Starman (Will Payton) =

Fictional comics superhero

- Will Payton as Starman, on the cover of Starman #1 (October 1988). Art by Tom Lyle

Publication information
- Publisher: DC Comics
- First appearance: Starman #1 (October 1988)
- Created by: Roger Stern; Tom Lyle

In-story information
- Alter ego: William "Will" Payton
- Species: Metahuman
- Team affiliations: Justice League
- Abilities: Flight; Superhuman strength and durability; Energy projection; Limited shapeshifting; Portal generation; Clairvoyance

Starman (Will Payton) is a DC Comics superhero who was created by Roger Stern and Tom Lyle, and one of several characters to have the Starmen name.

== Publication history ==
Starman was created by Roger Stern and Tom Lyle, and first appeared in Starman #1 (October 1988).

Starman was killed in Eclipso: The Darkness Within (1992). In 2020, he was resurrected in Scott Snyder's Justice League run, with Snyder believing him to be an under-explored character.

== Fictional character biography ==
Will Payton is a magazine copy editor who gained his powers of flight, super strength, energy projection, and limited shapeshifting after being struck by a bolt of energy from a satellite in space. The satellite had been launched by the Hutchison Institute, and the powers had been intended for their team of super-agents the Power Elite. Despite his short career, he gained a good reputation among other heroes, even assisting Superman on some occasions. Starman seemingly died while battling Eclipso.

The 1990s Starman series revealed that his fate was different from that previously believed. The mysterious bolt of energy that gave Payton his powers was revealed to be the essence of Gavyn, an alien prince who also used the name Starman. It is unclear whether Gavyn and Payton fused into one being with shared memories, or if Payton was killed by the bolt that struck him and replaced with Gavyn's essence.

Starman is resurrected in the DC Rebirth series Dark Nights: Metal. He is depicted as having gained his powers from the Totality, a cosmic source of energy and the prison of Perpetua.

== Powers and abilities ==
Starman possesses immense strength and durability, energy projection, and limited shapeshifting abilities that enable him to alter his costume. In modern continuity, Starman possesses the additional ability to create star-shaped portals and view other universes.
