= Bliss, Kentucky =

Unincorporated community in Kentucky, United States

Bliss
- Unincorporated community
- Location within the state of Kentucky Bliss (the United States)
- Coordinates: 37°4′48″N 85°22′19″W
- Country: United States
- State: Kentucky
- County: Adair
- Elevation: 696 ft (212 m)
- Time zone: UTC-6 (Central (CST))
  - Summer (DST): UTC-5 (CDT)
- GNIS feature ID: 507525

Bliss is an unincorporated community in Adair County, Kentucky, United States. Its elevation is 696 feet (212 m).

A post office called Bliss was established in 1900, and remained in operation until 1958. One Mr. Bliss, an early postmaster, gave the community his last name.
