= Jack Burnley =

American comic artist

- Born: January 11, 1911 New York City, U.S.
- Died: December 19, 2006 (aged 95) Charlottesville, Virginia, U.S.
- Areas: Comic book artist, illustrator
- Pseudonym: Hardin J. Burnley

Jack Burnley (January 11, 1911 – December 19, 2006) was the pen name of Hardin J. Burnley, an American comic book artist and illustrator. Burnley was the first artist, after co-creator Joe Shuster, to draw Superman in comic books.

== Biography ==
=== Early career ===
Born in New York City, Jack Burnley began his comics career working for the King Features Syndicate, providing cartoons for the sports section (including work for Damon Runyon). In 1929 he became the then-youngest artist to have a syndicated feature, and also produced illustrations for advertising. In 1938, Burnley began to freelance, producing "single-page sports fillers" for DC Comics, by whom he was subsequently hired in 1940. His first published assignment was the cover illustration for New York World's Fair 1940 (AKA World's Fair Comics #2); the cover portrayed Superman with Batman and Robin, the first time the trio had ever appeared together in print. Burnley went on to provide uncredited artwork for Action Comics until 1947. Burnley's work was often credited to other artists. In the 1945 Batman newspaper strips which Burnley penciled, the stylized Bob Kane signature logo appears, although Kane had not worked on the sequence.

The version of Superman he created was noted for its carefully drawn musculature, which set the style of superheroes for years to come. “I gave Superman a lot more muscle than he had originally,” he told a Charlottesville, Virginia newspaper in 2000. “When I came into comics I had a background in drawing the musclemen and heroes of sports, so it was rather easy for me to make the transition to drawing the comic figures.”

=== Later DC work ===
Burnley co-created (with writer Gardner Fox) the superhero Starman, which first appeared in Adventure Comics (April 1941). He "became DC's top ghost artist," working on the main characters and titles. In addition to pencilling over 100 covers, he also worked (for a brief time in 1944), as uncredited penciler on both the Batman and Superman Sunday comic strips. Burnley left DC and the comic book field in 1947, and returning to newspaper sports cartooning. He worked for the Pittsburgh Sun-Telegraph for four years, then for the San Francisco News until his retirement in 1976.

Burnley and his wife, former cabaret dancer Dolores Farris relocated to Charlottesville, Virginia in 1981. Burnley died on December 19, 2006, at the Heritage Hall senior facility in Charlottesville, following a fall that broke his hip.
