= Starman (DC Comics) =

Fictional comics superhero

- A collage of various Starmen (clockwise from top): Thom Kallor (background), Mikaal Tomas, Ted Knight, the Starman of 1951, Prince Gavyn, Jack Knight, and Will Payton (center). Art by Tony Harris and Alex Ross.

Publication information
- Publisher: DC Comics
- First appearance: Ted: Adventure Comics #61 (April 1941); Wayne: Detective Comics #247 (September 1957); Star-Man: Detective Comics #286 (December 1960); Tomas: 1st Issue Special #12 (March 1976); Gavyn: Adventure Comics #467 (January 1980); Payton: Starman #1 (October 1988); David: Starman #26 (September 1990); Jack: Zero Hour: Crisis in Time #1 (September 1994); Kallor: Kingdom Come #2 (June 1996); McNider: Starman Secret Files #1 (April 1998); Farris: JLA #23 (October 1998); Old West/Sono: Jonah Hex (vol. 2) #27 (March 2008)
- Created by: Ted: Gardner Fox; Jack Burnley; Star-Man: Sheldon Moldoff; Tomas: Gerry Conway; Mike Vosburg; Gavyn: Paul Levitz; Steve Ditko; Payton: Roger Stern; Tom Lyle; David: Roger Stern; Dave Hoover; Jack: James Robinson; Tony Harris; Farris: Grant Morrison; Howard Porter; Old West/Sono: Jimmy Palmiotti; Justin Gray

In-story information
- Alter ego: Theodore Knight; Bruce Wayne (pre-Crisis); Mikaal Tomas; Prince Gavyn; Will Payton; David Knight; Jack Knight; Thom Kallor; Charles McNider; Farris Knight; Victor Sono
- Place of origin: Tomas: Talok III; Gavyn: Throneworld; Kallor: Xanthu
- Team affiliations: Justice Society of America; Justice League
- Abilities: Star-Man: Superhuman strength Tomas: Flight and energy projection derived from the sonic crystal Invulnerability; Gavyn: Flight, energy manipulation, light/heat and radiation immunity self-sustenance able to withstand exposure to space Payton: Flight, superhuman strength and durability, limited shapeshifting, energy projection David: Use of the "Gravity Rod"; Kallor: Mass and density manipulation Farris: Use of the "Quarvat"

Starman is a name used by several different DC Comics superheroes, most prominently Ted Knight and his sons David and Jack.

The original Starman, Ted Knight, was created by writer Gardner Fox and artist Jack Burnley. He first appeared in Adventure Comics #61 (April 1941). Knight is an astronomer who invented a "gravity rod", later reinvented as a "cosmic rod", that allows him to fly and manipulate energy. He donned a red and green costume with a distinctive finned helmet.

Like most Golden Age heroes, Starman fell into obscurity in the 1950s. In the ensuing years, several characters, with varying degrees of relation to the original, briefly took the mantle of Starman.

In Zero Hour: Crisis in Time! #1 (September 1994), writer James Robinson and artist Tony Harris introduced Jack Knight, the son of the first Starman. A reluctant non-costumed hero, he inherited his father's name and mission and used his technology to create a cosmic staff. He starred in a critically acclaimed series, written by Robinson, from 1994 until 2001.

The current successor of Starman is Stargirl, formerly the second Star-Spangled Kid.

Starman, announcing that he comes "from the past", appears in Justice League (vol. 4) #7 (November 2018) and subsequent issues.

Below, in chronological order of activity (not of appearance), are the characters to have used the name "Starman".

== Theodore Knight ==
Theodore Henry Knight is a 1940s DC Comics superhero who wore a red costume with a finned helmet and a green cape, and wielded a "gravity rod" (later "cosmic rod") which enabled him to fly and fire energy bolts. He is a member of the Justice Society of America.

== Starman of 1951 ==
The Starman of 1951 is a superhero who operated in the DC Universe in 1951. In pre-Crisis continuity, the Starman of the 1950s was actually Batman, who briefly took up that mantle in Detective Comics #247 (September 1957), using variants of his usual equipment, but with a star motif instead of a bat, due to him having been hypnotized to be given a fear of bats in the belief that this would render him incapable of being a hero.

Post-Crisis, the character was retconned in Starman Secret Files and Origins. The name was first used by the original Doctor Mid-Nite, Charles McNider. When David Knight, son of the original Starman, is drawn back in time, he takes over the identity from McNider for a brief period.

== Star-Man ==
In Detective Comics #286, a villainous Star-Man appeared to menace Batman and Robin whose super-strength waned in the presence of a Tibetan belt worn by Batwoman.

== Mikaal Tomas ==
Mikaal Tomas is an alien who traveled to Earth to help conquer it, but instead turned against his war-like people in defense of the human race. He first appeared in 1st Issue Special #12 (March 1976).

== Prince Gavyn ==
Prince Gavyn is a DC Comics superhero created by Paul Levitz and Steve Ditko in Adventure Comics #467 (January 1980). He is a spoiled, blond, playboy prince of an alien empire who discovered he was a mutant who could survive unaided in space.

== Will Payton ==
Will Payton, a 1980s DC Comics superhero, was created by Roger Stern and Tom Lyle. Payton gained his powers of flight, super strength, the ability to alter his appearance and fire bolts of energy from his hands after being struck by a bolt of energy from a satellite in space. He was in his early twenties and worked as a magazine copy editor. He first appeared in Starman #1 (October 1988).

== David Knight ==
David Knight, a 1990s DC Comics superhero, was the son of the original Starman and elder brother of the 1990s Starman, Jack. He first appeared in Starman #26 (September 1990), having taken up his father's mantle, and was killed by an assassin in Starman (vol. 2) #0 (October 1994). However, his spirit returns to advise Jack.

In Starman (vol. 2) #81 (a one-issue revival and tie-in to Blackest Night), David temporarily returns as a Black Lantern.

== Jack Knight ==
Jack Knight, a 1990s DC Comics superhero, is the son of the original Starman, Ted Knight. He wields a cosmically powered staff, but refuses to wear a costume, instead preferring a T-shirt, leather jacket (with star emblem on the back), a Cracker Jack prize sheriff's star, and goggles. A reluctant hero who assumes the mantle after David's death, he is the protagonist of the comic book series written by James Robinson. Jack briefly joins the JSA, but retires at the end of the Starman series and gives his cosmic rod to Stargirl.

== Thom Kallor ==
Thom Kallor is a member of the Legion of Super-Heroes in the 31st century who can manipulate mass and density. Normally known as Star Boy, he becomes Starman after being transported to the 21st century.

== Farris Knight ==
The Starman of the 853rd century is Farris Knight, a member of Justice Legion Alpha and was a major character in the series DC One Million. He is a distant descendant of Jack Knight and Mist's son. Farris commands an alien artifact called a "quarvat", similar in function to the "cosmic rod". He lives on a space station in the orbit of Uranus from which he monitors the artificial sun Solaris. He asserts that being the descendant of the Mist as much as the Knights, he was predisposed to villainy, and Solaris eventually corrupts Farris. The man arranges for the defeat of the two JLAs and travels back in time to kill the originator of his hated responsibility, Ted Knight. Meeting Ted, however, changes his mind and Farris sacrifices himself to save Earth from Solaris.

== Victor Sono ==
Introduced in Jonah Hex (vol. 2) #27 (March 2008), the "Star Man" of the Old West originally came to New York City with his father from Italy just after the Civil War ended. His name was Victor Sono. His father tried to get work as a sheriff, but the group of lawmen with whom he interviewed mocked and killed him for being disabled. Young Victor later found his body hanging outside the building and decided to avenge his death. He pickpocketed a pistol and fired on the group. Before he could do much damage, however, the owner of the pistol, Jonah Hex, who was in town collecting a bounty, knocked him out and took his gun back. He nearly left the boy to the "lawmen", but after recalling his own terrible childhood, came back and rescued Victor, whom he left at an orphanage. Years later, Hex and Victor would cross paths again, Victor now calling himself the Star Man. He had dedicated his life to killing unjust lawmen and adding their sheriff's stars to his coat. Star Man has a habit of manipulating Hex for his own ends, although he does know that he owes Hex his life.

== Enemies ==
Each of the different incarnations of Starman has his own enemies:

- Blockbuster (Roland Desmond) - The brother of the original Blockbuster who went through the same treatment his brother went through.
- Deadline - A mercenary who can become intangible.
- Deathbolt - A criminal who was turned into a living battery by the Ultra-Humanite.
- Doctor Phosphorus - A radioactive villain with burning skin.
- Harold Melrose - A scientist.
- Mist - A supervillain who can turn into living vapor.
- The Power Elite - A group of six superpowered villains.
  - David Winters - A member of the Power Elite who can fire radiation blasts from his eyes.
  - Dennis Blake - A member of the Power Elite with energy-projecting abilities.
  - Frank Donovan - A member of the Power Elite who can shoot plasma flames from his hands.
  - Olivia Hardy - A member of the Power Elite who possesses superhuman strength.
  - Samantha Morgan - A member of the Power Elite who can change her size.
  - Stanley Hale - A member of the Power Elite with flight and telekinesis.
- Rag Doll - A contorting supervillain.
- Spider - The son of the original Spider.

== Other versions ==
- Courtney Whitmore / Stargirl is a superheroine and member of the Justice Society of America who inherited Jack Knight's cosmic staff after he retired from being Starman.
- Patricia Lynn Dugan, half-sister of Courtney Whitmore, assumes the name "Starwoman" in JSA #72.
- An alternate universe version of Ted Knight / Starman appears in JLA: Age of Wonder. This version is an inventor and friend of Superman, Thomas Edison, and Nikola Tesla who built his cosmic rod with technology gleaned from the rocket ship that brought Superman to Earth.
- An alternate universe version of Ted Knight, codenamed "Star", appears in JSA: The Unholy Three as an intelligence agent working at Chernobyl.
- An alternate universe version of Ted Knight / Starman makes a cameo appearance in JLA: Another Nail.
- Three alternate universe versions of Starman or related individuals, an adult Courtney Whitmore from Earth-7, an intelligent gorilla from Earth-17, and a feral Mikaal Tomas from Earth-48, appear in Countdown: Arena.

== Titles ==
=== Starman (vol. 1) ===
Starman (vol. 1)

Publication information
- Publisher: DC Comics
- Schedule: Monthly
- Format: Ongoing series
- Genre: Superhero
- Publication date: October 1988 – April 1992
- No. of issues: 45
- Main character: Starman (Will Payton)

Creative team
- Created by: Roger Stern; Tom Lyle

Starman (vol. 1) was a DC Comics ongoing series starring Starman (Will Payton). The series was published from October 1988 to April 1992. This Starman also appeared in a short story in Action Comics Weekly #622 released October 18, 1988.

=== Starman (vol. 2) ===
Starman (vol. 2)
- Cover to Starman (vol. 2) #0, art by Tony Harris and Alex Jay.

Publication information
- Publisher: DC Comics
- Schedule: Monthly
- Format: Ongoing series
- Genre: Superhero
- Publication date: October 1994 – August 2001
- No. of issues: 81 (plus issues #0 and 1,000,000; 2 Annuals; and various specials and miniseries)
- Main character: Starman (Jack Knight)

Creative team
- Written by: James Robinson
- Artist(s): Tony Harris; Peter Snejbjerg and others

Collected editions
- Starman Omnibus Vol. 1: ISBN 978-1401216993
- Starman Omnibus Vol. 2: ISBN 978-1401221942
- Starman Omnibus Vol. 3: ISBN 978-1401222840
- Starman Omnibus Vol. 4: ISBN 978-1401225964
- Starman Omnibus Vol. 5: ISBN 978-1401228897
- Starman Ominbus Vol. 6: ISBN 978-1401230449

Starman (vol. 2) was an ongoing series published by DC Comics from October 1994 to August 2001, starring the superhero Starman (Jack Knight). The series was written by James Robinson with art primarily by Tony Harris from issues #0–45 and Peter Snejbjerg from issues #50–80.

==== Style ====
Starman included a number of signature thematic and stylistic elements, which helped make it distinctive. One was the importance of collectibles and collecting. James Robinson was an avid collector of a number of different things and transferred this interest to the hero, Jack Knight, who ran a collectibles shop. Many of the guest characters would also discuss their collecting interests. The book also dealt with the past and nostalgia quite frequently. One manner was through the irregular appearance of "Times Past" issues set in a different time period. These usually, but not always, focused on one of the other Starmen or Shade. Text pieces, dubbed "The Shade's Journal" and dealing with that character's adventures over his long life, also appeared irregularly instead of a letter column. In addition, most of the characters who appeared in the book had some connection to a legacy from the past. They were either immortal, had inherited a role from a family member, or were the reincarnation of a previous hero. The book also featured a number of discussions and meditations on age. Another stylistic theme in the book was the often impressionistic approach to violence and conflict. The lead up to, and aftereffects of, violence were generally much more important in the Starman comic book than the violence itself. A number of confrontations that Jack Knight had with "villains" ended peacefully, such as an early encounter with a bounty hunter who broke into Jack's shop looking for an enchanted shirt. After a short scuffle, Jack, seeing no reason not to, agrees to sell the man the shirt. When violence was depicted, it was often much more impressionistic instead of the highly choreographed and detailed violence seen in many superhero comics. Finally, a sense of place informed many Starman stories. James Robinson has stated his appreciation for the fictional cities of the DC Universe. With Starman (vol. 2), he attempted to develop the setting of Opal City as a real place with a distinct character. Robinson and artist Tony Harris developed maps of Opal City and came up with a fictional history of it. Characters would often make mention of specific locations in the city and small bits of its history.

==== Reception ====
Commenting on the character and series, comic writer Geoff Johns wrote:

During the mid '90s, during the height of revamping and reintroducing characters (since everything, and unfortunately anything was selling), Starman hits the stands. Among all the knives and guns, shoulder pads, and line-filled art, Jack Knight looked out of place. There were no "Bad Girl" pin-ups or brutal vigilantism, just a regular guy flying around in his jacket and sneakers. A guy who would rather see Browning's Freaks than put on a cape and stop crime. But it worked. It totally worked. While most gun-toting anti-heroes and bad girls faded away, Jack Knight became an instant classic. And to a lot of readers, Starman had become "the" favorite hero.

==== Awards and nominations ====
Starman was nominated in the 1995 Eisner Awards for "Best Continuing Series" and "Best Serialized Story" for the story arc "Sins of the Father" (issues #0–3) and won the Eisner Award for "Best Serialized Story" for the story arc "Sand and Stars" (issues #20–23). It was also nominated for "Best Continuing Series" in 1997.

==== Collected editions ====
Most of the Starman (vol. 2) series has been collected in several trade paperbacks. Uncollected issues in this series are #36, 42, 44, 46, 54 and 74, Starman 80-Page Giant #1, Starman: The Mist #1, Stars and S.T.R.I.P.E. #0, JSA: All Stars #4, The Shade #1–4 and Batman/Hellboy/Starman #1–2.

Title	Material collected	Publication date	ISBN
Sins of the Father	Starman (vol. 2) #0–5	January 1996	978-1563892486
Night and Day	Starman (vol. 2) #7–10, 12–16	March 1997	978-1563892707
A Wicked Inclination	Starman (vol. 2) #17, 19–27	March 1998	978-1563894091
Times Past	Starman (vol. 2) #6, 11, 18, 28, Annual #1; Starman Secret Files and Origins #1	February 1999	978-1563894923
Infernal Devices	Starman (vol. 2) #29–35, 37–38	October 2000	978-1563896330
To Reach the Stars	Starman (vol. 2) #39–41, 43, 45, Annual #2; The Power of Shazam! #35–36	May 2001	978-1563897122
A Starry Knight	Starman (vol. 2) #47–53	March 2002	978-1563897979
Stars My Destination	Starman (vol. 2) #55–60	January 2004	978-1401200114
Grand Guignol	Starman (vol. 2) #61–73	October 2004	978-1401202576
Sons of the Father	Starman (vol. 2) #75–80	April 2005	978-1401204730

The entire Starman (vol. 2) series has been collected in six DC Omnibus hardcovers.

Title	Material collected	Publication date	ISBN
Starman Omnibus Volume 1	Starman (vol. 2) #0–16	June 2008	978-1401216993
Starman Omnibus Volume 2	Starman (vol. 2) #17–29, Annual #1; relevant stories from Showcase '95 #12, Showcase '96 #4–5	March 2009	978-1401221942
Starman Omnibus Volume 3	Starman (vol. 2) #30–38, Annual #2; Starman Secret Files and Origins #1; The Shade #1–4	June 2009	978-1401222840
Starman Omnibus Volume 4	Starman (vol. 2) #39–46; Starman 80-Page Giant #1; Starman: The Mist #1; The Power of Shazam! #35–36; Batman/Hellboy/Starman #1–2	February 2010	978-1401225964
Starman Omnibus Volume 5	Starman (vol. 2) #47–60, 1,000,000; Stars and S.T.R.I.P.E. #0; All Star Comics 80-Page Giant #1; JSA: All Stars #4	October 2010	978-1401228897
Starman Omnibus Volume 6	Starman (vol. 2) #61–81	January 2011	978-1401230449

The entire Starman (vol. 2) series is being collected in larger Compendium editions.

Title	Material collected	Publication date	ISBN
Starman Compendium One	Starman (vol. 2) #0–42, Annual #1; The Shade #1-4; Starman Secret Files and Origins #1; Showcase '95 #12, Showcase '96 #4, Showcase '96 #5,The Power of Shazam! #35-36	August 2021	978-1779509413
Starman Compendium Two	All-Star Comics 80-Page Giant #1, Batman/Hellboy/Starman #1-2, JSA All-Stars #4, Starman #43-81, Starman #1 (1998), Starman/Congorilla #1, Stars and S.T.R.I.P.E. #0, and The Shade #1-12	July 2022	978-1779515223

== In other media ==
- The Prince Gavyn incarnation of Starman makes non-speaking cameo appearances in Justice League Unlimited.
- A television series based on Jack Knight was in development, but was rendered "indefinitely on hold" in 2003.
- The Ted Knight incarnation of Starman appears in the Batman: The Brave and the Bold episode "Crisis: 22,300 Miles Above Earth!", voiced by Jeff Bennett.
- Machinima Inc. and DC Entertainment were producing a live-action web series based on an updated version of the original concept of Starman titled DC's Hero Project.
- An original incarnation of Starman, with elements of and named after Sylvester Pemberton, appears in Stargirl, portrayed by Joel McHale.
