= Starman (Ted Knight) =

Comic book superhero

- Textless cover of Starman #72 (December 2000), art by Andrew Robinson.

Publication information
- Publisher: DC Comics
- First appearance: Adventure Comics #61 (April 1941)
- Created by: Gardner Fox; Jack Burnley

In-story information
- Alter ego: Theodore Henry "Ted" Knight
- Species: Human
- Team affiliations: Justice Society of America; All-Star Squadron; Justice League
- Abilities: Fine hand to hand combatant Gifted inventor Brilliant intellect Via gravity and cosmic rods: Flight; Stellar energy, light and heat projection; Force field and simple energy construct generation; Telekinesis

Starman (Theodore Henry "Ted" Knight) is a superhero appearing in media published by DC Comics, primarily as a member of the Justice Society of America. Created by writer Gardner Fox and artist Jack Burnley, he first appeared in Adventure Comics #61 (April 1941).

== Publication history ==
Ted Knight as the original Starman, as he appeared on the cover of Adventure Comics #61 (April 1941). Art by Jack Burnley.

Invited by editor Whitney Ellsworth to create a new superhero character, Burnley drew the Starman costume as a variation of Superman's famous outfit, topped with a Buck Rogers-style helmet. Gardner Fox developed the character, and science-fiction writer Alfred Bester also contributed Starman scripts. Later in the run, Emil Gershwin wrote the stories, with art by Mort Meskin and George Roussos.

His first story in Adventure Comics #61 (April 1941) pitted Starman against the sinister Dr. Doog, who threatened the world with his invention, the Ultra-Dynamo.

He continued to appear in Adventure Comics through #102 (Feb 1946), and All-Star Comics #8 (Dec 1941) to #23 (Winter 1944).

== Fictional character biography ==
As Starman, Ted wears a caped costume of red and green topped with a helmet with a fin on the top. He uses a gravity rod (later cosmic rod) which allows him to fly and to manipulate energy, at times in a manner similar to Green Lantern's power ring. As Ted Knight, he is an astronomer and an expert scientist, having developed the rods himself.

Initially intending the rod as a power source, Ted is convinced by his cousin, Sandra Knight / Phantom Lady, to use it to fight crime. In the original 1940s stories, Starman operated out of Gotham City, but this was retconned in the 1990s to Opal City.

Starman's first recurring villain is Mist, an elderly scientist who develops an invisibility potion that leaves only his head and hands visible. Starman's rogues gallery also includes Astra the Astrologist, Cuthbert Cain, Dr. Doog and the Secret Brotherhood of the Electron, and the Veil.

He is a frequent ally of the FBI and a member of the Justice Society of America for much of the 1940s and, like other "mystery men" of the time, serves in the wartime All-Star Squadron. In 1942, Ted enlists in the U.S. Army Air Force and briefly serves as a pilot during World War II.

At this time, the love of Ted's life is Doris Lee, who often chastises her layabout playboy boyfriend for his pretended laziness and hypochondria, unaware of Ted's costumed persona. Doris is tragically murdered in the late 1940s, leading Ted to have a nervous breakdown. He is placed in a mental institution for a number of years as a result.

In the 1990s-era Starman series, Ted is motivated to return to active duty in part by his own time-traveling son, Jack. Additionally, it is revealed that Ted had a brief affair with the first Black Canary (Dinah Drake) in the 1960s.

Like the rest of the Justice Society, Starman spends many years in retirement following the end of the Golden Age of heroes, but returns to help mentor the team's spiritual successors the Justice League. During this time, Ted Knight marries Adele Drew and has two children, Jack and David. In Zero Hour: Crisis in Time!, Ted loses his slowed aging after being attacked by Extant and is forced into retirement.

Following Ted's retirement, David inherits his mantle as Starman, but is killed in battle. Jack then inherits the title, although not without grievances. In exchange for Jack taking up the defense of Opal City, Ted agrees to use his cosmic-powered inventions for the benefit of mankind. Additionally, Ted gives aid and shelter to Solomon Grundy and a former Starman, Mikaal Tomas.

In the final battle for the salvation of Opal City, Ted Knight confronts two of his deadliest enemies — Doctor Phosphorus and Rag Doll. Ted fends off the villains, but is left with terminal cancer due to Phosphorus's radiation. Ted eventually dies in battle with his old enemy Mist. With a variant of his gravity rod, he transports them both into the stratosphere, where Mist's doomsday bomb detonates without harming the city and kills them both.

== Powers and abilities ==
Ted Knight has no natural, superhuman powers. His abilities stem from the use of his inventions, the gravity rod and the cosmic rod. These devices channel an unknown form of stellar radiation, which Ted is able to manipulate through the rod. As Starman, he possesses the ability to fly, project bursts of stellar energy, light, and heat, create force fields and simple energy constructs, and levitate objects. Extended use of the cosmic rod created a bond between it and Ted, allowing him to mentally summon the rod when separated from it.

Ted possesses a intellect, mastery of several sciences, and a gift for invention. In addition to the gravity and cosmic rods, Ted created the cosmic staff used by his son, Jack, and the cosmic converter belt used by Star-Spangled Kid and Stargirl.

== Other versions ==
- An alternate universe version of Ted Knight / Starman appears in JLA: Age of Wonder. This version is an inventor and friend of Superman, Thomas Edison, and Nikola Tesla who built his cosmic rod with technology gleaned from the rocket ship that brought Superman to Earth.
- An alternate universe version of Ted Knight, codenamed "Star", appears in JSA: The Unholy Three as an intelligence agent working at Chernobyl.
- An alternate universe version of Ted Knight / Starman makes a cameo appearance in JLA: Another Nail.

== Collected editions ==
- Golden Age Starman Archives Vol. 1 (Starman stories from Adventure Comics #61-76)
- Golden Age Starman Archives Vol. 2 (Starman stories from Adventure Comics #77-102)

== In other media ==
- Ted Knight / Starman appears in the Batman: The Brave and the Bold episode "Crisis: 22,300 Miles Above Earth!", voiced by Jeff Bennett.
- Ted Knight / Starman appears in Justice League: Crisis on Infinite Earths.
- Ted Knight / Starman received a figure in Mattel's DC Universe Classics line.
