= List of comic book sidekicks =

This is a list of comic book sidekicks—defined as a character who spends a significant amount of time as a superhero's junior partner, or was officially acknowledged as the hero's sidekick for some period of time. (For the purposes of this list, it does not include animal companions like Krypto or Doctor Mid-Nite's owls, or supervillain henchmen such as Harley Quinn.)

== DC ==
Sidekick	Full name or Alter-ego	Hero	First appearance	Year	Notes
Aquagirl	Tula	Aquaman	Aquaman #33 (May–June 1967)	1967	
Aquagirl	Lorena Marquez	Aquaman	Aquaman (vol. 6) #16 (May 2004)	2004	
Aqualad	Garth	Aquaman	Adventure Comics #269 (February 1960)	1960	Later becomes Tempest.
Aqualad	Jackson Hyde / Kaldur'ahm	Aquaman	Brightest Day #4 (June 2010)	2010	
Aqualass	Andrina "Andy" Curry	Aquaman	Generations Shattered #1	2021	
Bat-Girl	Mary Elizabeth "Bette" Kane	Batwoman	Batman #139 (April 1961)	1961	Later becomes Flamebird
Batgirl	Barbara Gordon	Batman	Detective Comics #359 (January 1967)	1967	Later becomes Oracle.
Batgirl	Cassandra Cain	Batman	Legends of the Dark Knight #120 (August 1999) (Note: First appearance, as Cassandra, in Batman #567 (July 1999).)	1999	Later becomes Black Bat.
Batgirl	Stephanie Brown	Batman	Robin #126 (July 2004)	2004	Later becomes Spoiler.
Bluebird	Harper Row	Batman	Batman (vol. 2) #28 (February 2014)	2014	
Boom	Judy Garrick	Flash (Jay Garrick)	The New Golden Age #1 (January 2023)	2023	
Snapper Carr	Lucas Carr	Justice League	The Brave and the Bold #28 (February–March 1960)	1960	
Cherry Bomb	Gloria James	Human Bomb	The New Golden Age #1 (January 2023)	2023	
Dan the Dyna-Mite	Daniel Dunbar	TNT	Star-Spangled Comics #7 (April 1942)	1942	
Doiby Dickles	Charles Dickles	Green Lantern (Alan Scott)	All-American Comics #27 (June 1941)	1941	
Fatman	Bob Daley	Mister America	Action Comics #2 (July 1938)	1938	
Kid Devil	Edward Alan Bloomberg	Blue Devil	Blue Devil #14 (July 1985) (Note: First appearance, as Eddie Bloomberg, in Blue Devil #1 (June 1984).)	1985	Later becomes Red Devil.
Kid Flash	Wally West	Flash (Barry Allen)	Flash #110 (1959)	1959	Later becomes the Flash.
Kid Flash	Bartholomew "Bart" Allen II	Flash (Wally West)	Teen Titans (vol. 3) #4 (December 2003) (Note: First appearance (as Impulse) is Flash (vol. 2) #92 (June 1994).)	1994	Originally Impulse. Later becomes the Flash.
Kid Flash	Wallace "Ace" West	Flash (Barry Allen)/Flash (Wally West)	Flash (vol. 4) Annual #3 (June 2014)	2014	
Ladybug	Rosibel Rivera	Red Bee	The New Golden Age #1 (January 2023)	2023	
Lieutenant Marvels	Lt. Tall Marvel ("Tall" Billy Batson); Lt. Fat Marvel ("Fat" Billy Batson); Lt. Hill Marvel ("Hill" Billy Batson)	Captain Marvel	Whiz Comics #21 (September 1941)	1941	
Newsboy Legion	Tommy Tompkins; Big Words; Gabby; Scrapper	Guardian	Star Spangled Comics #7 (April 1942)	1942	
Jimmy Olsen	James Bartholomew Olsen	Superman	Superman #13 (November–December 1941) (Note: An anonymous "copy boy" who resembles Olsen makes a brief appearance in Action Comics #6, but the character called Jimmy Olsen first appeared in the radio show The Adventures of Superman (on April 15, 1940).)	1941	
Pinky the Whiz Kid	"Pinky" Butler	Mr. Scarlet	Wow Comics #4 (Winter 1940–1941)	1940	
Molly Pitcher	Molly Preacher	Miss America	The New Golden Age #1 (January 2023)	2023	
Quiz Kid	Raghu Seetharaman	Mister Terrific (Terry Sloane)	The New Golden Age #1 (January 2023)	2023	
Red Arrow	Emiko Queen	Green Arrow	Green Arrow (vol. 6) #15 (March 2017) (Note: First appearance was Green Arrow (vol. 5) #18 (May 2013))	2013	
Robin	Dick Grayson	Batman	Detective Comics #38 (April 1940)	1940	Later becomes Nightwing, and then the new Batman. He also enters the organization Spyral with the name agent 37 after faking his death to the Crime Syndicate. Shortly after he returns to the mantle of Nightwing.
Robin	Carrie Kelley	Batman	Batman: The Dark Knight Returns #1 (February 1986)	1986	
Robin	Jason Todd	Batman	Batman #357 (March 1983) (Note: First appeared as Jason Todd in Batman #357 (March 1983).)	1983	Dies in Batman #429 (January 1989); resurrected as the Red Hood in Batman #635 (December 2004).
Robin	Timothy Jackson Wayne (formerly Timothy Drake)	Batman	Batman #442 (December 1989) (Note: First appeared as Tim Drake in Batman #436 (August 1989).)	1989	Later becomes Red Robin and Drake.
Robin	Stephanie Brown	Batman	Robin #126 (July 2004) (Note: First appeared as Stephanie Brown in Detective Comics #647 (August 1992); as Spoiler in Detective Comics #648 (September 1992).)	2004	Originally Spoiler. Later becomes Batgirl.
Robin	Damian Wayne	Batman	Batman and Robin #1 (August 2009) (Note: First appeared as a baby in Batman: Son of the Demon (1987) and as Damian Wayne in Batman #655 (September 2006).)	2009	
Robin	Mia "Maps" Mizoguchi	Batman	Gotham Academy: Maps of Mystery #1 (July 2023)	2023	
Rocket	Raquel Ervin	Icon	Icon #1 (May 1993)	1993	
Betsy Ross	Elizabeth Rose	Miss America	The New Golden Age #1 (January 2023)	2023	
Pete Ross	Peter Joseph Ross	Superboy	Superboy #86 (January 1961)	1961	
Salem the Witch Girl	Salem Rula Nader	Doctor Fate (Kent Nelson) (originally); Doctor Fate (Khalid Nassour) (currently)	The New Golden Age #1 (January 2023)	2023	
Sandy the Golden Boy	Sanderson "Sandy" Hawkins	Sandman (Wesley Dodds)	Adventure Comics #69 (December 1941)	1941	
Signal	Duke Thomas	Batman	Batman (vol. 2) #21 (August 2013)	2013	
Sparky	Sparkington J. Northrup	Blue Beetle (Dan Garrett)	Blue Beetle #14 (September 1942)	1942	
Speedy	Roy Harper	Green Arrow	Star-Spangled Comics #7 (April 1942)	1942	Later becomes Arsenal, and then Red Arrow.
Speedy	Mia Dearden	Green Arrow	Green Arrow (vol. 3) #44 (January 2005) (Note: First appearance (as Mia Dearden) was Green Arrow (vol. 3) #2 (May 2001).)	2005	
Stitch	Stitch	Doctor Fate (Khalid Nassour)	Teen Titans Academy #1 (May 2021) (Note: First appearance was Future State: Teen Titans #1 (March 2021).)	2021	
Stripesy	Patrick "Pat" Dugan	Star-Spangled Kid	Action Comics #40 (September 1941).	1941	Unique in that he is the adult sidekick of a teenage superhero. Later becomes S.T.R.I.P.E.
Stuff the Chinatown Kid	Jimmy Leong	Vigilante	Action Comics #45 (February 1942)	1942	Dies in World's Finest Comics #246 (August–September 1977).
Superboy	Kon-El / Conner Kent	Superman	Adventures of Superman #500 (June 1993)	1993	
Superboy	Jonathan "Jon" Kent	Superman	Convergence: Superman #2 (July 2015)	2015	
Supergirl (Kara Zor-El)	Kara Danvers	Superman	Action Comics #252 (May 1959)	1959	
Talon	Dick Grayson	Owlman	Supergirl #12 (January 2007)	2007	
Terra	Atlee	Power Girl	Supergirl vol. 5 #12 (January 2007)	2007	
Uncle Marvel	Dudley H. Dudley	Mary Marvel	Wow Comics #18 (October 1943)	1943	
Wing	Wing How	Crimson Avenger	Detective Comics #20 (October 1938)	1938	Dies in Justice League of America #100 (August 1972).
Woozy Winks	Wolfgang Winks	Plastic Man	Police Comics #13 (November 1942)	1942	
Wonder Girl	Donna Troy	Wonder Woman	The Brave and the Bold #60 (July 1965)	1965	Later becomes Troia.
Wonder Girl	Cassandra Sandsmark	Wonder Woman	Wonder Woman (vol. 2) #105 (January 1996)	1996	
Squire	Percy Sheldrake	Shining Knight	Young All-Stars #21 (January 1988)	1988	Later becomes Knight.
Squire	Cyril Sheldrake	Knight	Batman #62 (December 1950)	1950	Later becomes Knight.
Squire	Beryl Hutchinson	Knight	JLA #26 (February 1999)	1999	Later becomes Knight.

== Marvel Comics ==
Sidekick	Full name or Alter-ego	Hero	First appearance	Year	Notes
Alpha	Andrew "Andy" Maguire	Spider-Man	Amazing Spider-Man #692 (October 2012)	2012	
Bob	Bob, Agent of Hydra	Deadpool	Cable & Deadpool #38(May 2007)	2007	
Bucky	James Buchanan Barnes	Captain America	Captain America Comics #1 (March 1941)	1941	Later becomes Winter Soldier and then Captain America.
Demolition Man	Dennis Dunphy	Captain America	Captain America #328 (April 1987) (Note: First appearance, as Dennis Dunphy, in The Thing #28 (October 1985).)	1987	
Dum Dum Dugan	Timothy Aloysius Cadwallander Dugan	Nick Fury	Sgt. Fury and his Howling Commandos #1 (May 1963)	1963	
Free Spirit	Cathy Webster	Captain America	Captain America #431 (September 1994)	1994	
Jackdaw	N.A. (Extra-dimensional Otherworld Elf)	Captain Britain	The Incredible Hulk Weekly #57 (April 1980)	1980	Dies in Mighty World of Marvel vol. 2, #10 (March 1984).
Jack Flag	Jack Harrison	Captain America	Captain America #434 (December 1994)	1994	
Jubilee	Jubilation "Jubilee" Lee	Wolverine	Uncanny X-Men #244 (May 1989)	1989	
Rick Jones	Richard Milhouse Jones	Hulk	The Incredible Hulk #1 (May 1962)	1962	Later becomes sidekick to Captain America (1969) (briefly becoming Bucky), Captain Marvel (Mar-Vell) (1971), Rom the Spaceknight (1985), and Captain Marvel (Genis-Vell) (1999).
Foggy Nelson	Franklin P. Nelson	Daredevil	Daredevil #1 (April 1964)	1964	
Jim Rhodes	James Rupert Rhodes	Iron Man	Iron Man #118 (January 1979)	1979	Later temporarily becomes Iron Man, then War Machine, then Iron Patriot.
Sun Girl	Mary Mitchell	Human Torch (android)	Sun Girl #1 (August 1948)	1948	
Toro	Thomas Raymond	Human Torch (android)	Human Torch Comics #2 (Fall 1940)	1940	
Jim Wilson	N.A.	Hulk	The Incredible Hulk #131 (September 1970)	1970	Dies from AIDS in Incredible Hulk #420 (August 1994).
Wong	Wong	Doctor Strange	Strange Tales #110 (July 1963)	1963	

== Golden Age, independent, and non-U.S. titles ==
Sidekick	Full name or Alter-ego	Hero	First appearance	Year	Notes
Altar Boy	Brian Thomas Kinney	Confessor	Kurt Busiek's Astro City Vol. 2, #5 (January 1997) (Note: First appearance, as Brian Kinney, in Astro City Vol. 2, #4 (December 1996).)	1997	Later becomes Confessor.
Arthur the Moth	Arthur	Tick	The Tick #4 (April 1989)	1989	
Atomaid	TK	Atoman	Top 10 #12 (October 2001)	2001	Member of the Young Sentinels; revealed that the Seven Sentinels are actually a child sex ring and that the Young Sentinels are their victims.
Bert	?	Dirkjan	DirkJan		
Bert Bibber		Piet Pienter	Piet Pienter en Bert Bibber	1951	The not-too-bright friend of Piet Pienter.
Bertje	?	Kramikske	Kramikske	1944	Kramikske's best friend and just like him a baker boy.
Bluejay	TK	Kingfisher	Top 10 #12 (October 2001)	2001	Member of the Young Sentinels; revealed that the Seven Sentinels are actually a child sex ring and that the Young Sentinels are their victims.
Blutch		Sergeant Cornelius Chesterfield	Les Tuniques Bleues	1968	The best friend of Chesterfield, though they often squabble and he doesn't share Chesterfield's patriotism nor belief in the military.
Bravo	? Ruiz	El Hombre	Astro City Vol. 2, #16 (March 1999)	1999	
Bobje	?	Bert Vanderslagmulders	Bert	1991	Bert's humanoid dog.
Pé Bruyneel	?	Bakelandt	Bakelandt		Good friend of Bakelandt.
Bo Bug	?	Bucky Bug	Bucky Bug	1932	A hobo with a high hat who is Bucky's best friend.
Oliver B. Bumble	?	Tom Poes	Tom Poes	1941	A nobleman and Tom's best friend.
Buzzboy	Tommy Paine	Captain Ultra	Buzzboy #1 (May 1988)	1988	
Captain Haddock	Archibald Haddock	Tintin	The Crab with the Golden Claws	1941	
Chippy	TK	Midnight Mink	Brat Pack #1 (August 1990)	1990	
Chippy	Cody	Midnight Mink	Brat Pack #1 (August 1990)	1990	
Fantasio		Spirou	Spirou et Fantasio	1944	An impulsive reporter, who is Spirou's best friend.
Filiberke		Jommeke	Jommeke	1955	Jommeke's best friend.
Flupke	?	Quick	Quick and Flupke	1930	Best friend of Quick.
Java	?	Martin Mystère	Martin Mystère	1944	A Neanderthal Man, discovered by Martin Mystère and a frequent helping hand, due to his strength.
Jerom		Lambik	Suske en Wiske	1952	Good friend of Lambik, though they do have a love-hate relationship sometimes.
Davy Jones Jr.	TK	Davy Jones	Top 10 #12 (October 2001)	2001	Member of the Young Sentinels; revealed that the Seven Sentinels are actually a child sex ring and that the Young Sentinels are their victims.
Jughead	Forsythe Pendleton Jones III	Archie	Pep Comics #22 (December 1941)	1941	
Eva Kant	N.A.	Diabolik	Diabolik #3 (March 3, 1963)	1963	
Finch	Lisa Flora Cecilia SanRosas	Duck-Girl	"Duck-Girl & Crane Animated!" (Dec 2011)	2011	
Kato	Hayashi Kato	Green Hornet	Green Hornet Comics #1 (December 1940)	1940	
Kid Marvelman	Johnny Bates	Marvelman	Marvelman #102 (July 1955)	1955	Also known as Kid Miracleman.
Kid Supreme	Charles Flanders	Supreme	Supreme #9 (January 1994)	1993	
Kid Vicious	TK	Judge Jury	Brat Pack #1 (August 1990)	1990	Brat Pack features the first and second Kid Vicious.
Kitkat	?	Leopardman	Astro City #5 (September 1995)	1995	Later becomes Greymalkin.
Hilarion Lefuneste		Achille Talon	Achille Talon		Neighbour of Achille.
Leo	?	Gilles de Geus	Gilles de Geus	1985	Good, brawny, but monosyllabic friend of Gilles.
Libellulle		Gil Jourdan	Gil Jourdan	1956	A former thief, who has become Gil's right-hand in solving crimes.
Looney Leo	N.A.	Gentleman	Astro City Vol. 2, #13 (February 1998) (Note: First mentioned in Astro City Vol. 2, #1 (September 1996 ).)	1998	
Luna	TK	Moon Mistress	Brat Pack #1 (August 1990)	1990	Brat Pack features the first and second Luna.
Minimum	?	Chlorophylle	Chlorophylle	?	A mouse who is Chlorophylle's best friend.
Obelix	N.A.	Asterix	Asterix the Gaul	1959	
Peewit	1954	Johan	Johan and Peewit	?	A dwarf who is Johan's best friend.
Pup	TK	Hound	Top 10 #12 (October 2001)	2001	Member of the Young Sentinels; revealed that the Seven Sentinels are actually a child sex ring and that the Young Sentinels are their victims.
Quark	Charlie Provost	Starfighter	Astro City Vol. 2 #13 (February 1998)	1998	
Reggie	?	Biebel	Biebel	1983	Biebel's younger brother, who is considerably more happy and naïve than him.
Scorchy	TK	Sizzler	Top 10 #12 (October 2001)	2001	Member of the Young Sentinels; revealed that the Seven Sentinels are actually a child sex ring and that the Young Sentinels are their victims.
Slugger, the Junior Dynamo	?	All-American	Astro City Vol. 2 #1/2	1996	
Spip		Spirou	Spirou et Fantasio	1939	A grouchy squirrel who is Spirou's pet.
Tamme	?	Hannes	De Geuzen	1985	
Tim	Tim Roland	Black Terror	Exciting Comics #9 (January 1941)	1941	
Antoine Vertignasse	?	Le Petit Spirou	Le Petit Spirou	1944	Best friend of Spirou, whose name is often shortened to "Vert".
Ebony White	N.A.	Spirit	The Spirit comic strip (June 2, 1940)	1940	
Wild Boy	TK	King Rad	Brat Pack #1 (August 1990)	1990	Brat Pack features the first and second Wild Boy.
Young Marvelman	Dickie Dauntless	Marvelman	Marvelman #101 (July 1955)	1955	Also known as Young Miracleman.

== Newspaper comics ==
Sidekick	Full name or Alter-ego	Hero	Series	First appearance	Notes
Joey McDonald		Dennis Mitchell	Dennis the Menace (U.S. comics)		
Lucky Eddie	/	Hägar the Horrible	Hägar the Horrible	1973	The not-too-bright second man in command.
Marcie	/	Peppermint Patty	Peanuts	1968	
The Nipper Twins	/	The Yellow Kid	Hogan's Alley	1896	Two tiny versions of The Yellow Kid introduced by George Luks when he took over Hogan's Alley between 1896 and 1897, after Richard F. Outcault left the newspaper they were originally printed in.
Wimpy	/	Popeye	Popeye	?	
Woodstock	N.A.	Snoopy	Peanuts	June 22, 1970 (Note: The first bird that bore a prototypical resemblance to Woodstock visited Snoopy in 1967, and this is generally considered his debut, though Snoopy creator Charles Schulz did not give him a name and establish him as a full-fledged character until June 22, 1970.)	

== See also ==
- Sidekick
