= Timeline of DC Comics (1950s) =

The 1950s was the birth of many relevant characters and marked a resolution between DC Comics and Fawcett comics. This led to DC Comics adopting multiple Fawcett Comics characters, like Hopalong Cassidy.

Some relevant characters that were created during this decade are Deadshot, Lana Lang, Killer Moth, Dr. Thirteen, Rex The Wonder Dog, Firefly, Martian Manhunter, Batwoman, Iris Allen, Captain Cold, Brainiac, Supergirl, Calendar Man, Phantom Stranger, and Bizarro.

This decade also included the first uses of certain ideas or concepts, like the Red Hood backstory for the Joker and the Fortress of Solitude, alongside being the first decade in which teamwork between Superman and Batman occurred.

== 1950 ==
- February / March - The series The Adventures of Bob Hope was debuted.
- June - The character Deadshot was debuted by David Vern Reed, Lew Sayre Schwartz and Bob Kane.
- July - The character King Faraday was debuted by Robert Kanigher and Carmine Infantino. Atom Man vs. Superman film serial was debuted.
- August / September - The series Strange Adventures was debuted.
- September / October- The character Lana Lang was debuted by Bill Finger and John Sikela.
- December - The first Knight and Squire are debuted by Bill Finger and Dick Sprang.

== 1951 ==
- February - The character Killer Moth was debuted in Batman #63. The identity of Red Hood was used for the first time as an early alias of the Joker in The Man Behind the Red Hood!, which also provided the earliest origin story for the Joker.
- April - Mystery in Space #1 is released.
- May - The Trigger Twins debut in All-Star Western #58
- June - Captain Comet was debuted in Strange Adventures #9
- October - King Kull was debuted in Captain Marvel Adventures #125, who was later acquired by DC Comics.
- November - Dr. Terrance Thirteen was debuted in Star Spangled Comics #122

== 1952 ==
- January - Rex The Wonder Dog has his first appearance in The Adventures of Rex the Wonder Dog #1
- May - In Superman 76, The Mightiest Team in the World, the first team-up between Batman and Superman occurs and they discover each other's secret identity.
- June - Firefly is created for Detective Comics #184.
- July - Detective Chimp has his first appearance in The Adventures of Rex the Wonder Dog #4.
- August - Our Army At War and Star Spangled War Stories (Volume One) has its first issue. Phantom Stranger has his first appearance, being the titular character of Phantom Stranger #1.
- October - G.I. Combat is released.
- November - Star Spangled War Stories (Volume Two) has first issue.

== 1953 ==
- National Comics Publications v. Fawcett Publications is settled outside of court. Fawcett Comics stops making comics and pays DC Comics a lump sum of $400,000

== 1954 ==
- Hopalong Cassidy is revived by DC Comics in Hopalong Cassidy #86 after Fawcett Comics became defunct.

== 1955 ==
- March - Krypto was debuted in Adventure Comics #210
- July - Ace the Bat-Hound was debuted in Batman #92.
- August - The Brave and the Bold has its first issue.
- November - Martian Manhunter was debuted in Detective Comics #225.

== 1956 ==
- July - Batwoman appeared for the first time in Detective Comics #233
- October - Iris West Allen was debuted in Showcase #4.

== 1957 ==
- June - Captain Cold was debuted in Showcase #6.

== 1958 ==
- June - The first appearance of Superman's Fortress of Solitude in Action Comics #241.
- July - Brainiac was debuted in Action Comics #242.
- September - Superman #124 is released, the first DC title with a regular letters column. Calendar Man was debuted in Detective Comics #259.
- October - Bizarro was debuted in Superboy #68.

== 1959 ==
- May - Bat-Mite was debuted in Detective Comics #267. Gorilla Grodd was debuted in The Flash #106. Supergirl was debuted in Action Comics #252.
- September - The Suicide Squad debuted in The Brave and the Bold #25.
- October - Hal Jordan was debuted in Showcase #22.

== See also ==
- Golden Age of Comics
- Silver Age of Comics
