= Swagman (comics) =

DC Comics character

Publication information
- Publisher: DC Comics
- First appearance: Batman #676 (June 2008)
- Created by: Grant Morrison (writer); Tony Daniel (artist)

In-story information
- Alter ego: Unknown
- Species: Human
- Place of origin: Earth
- Team affiliations: The Black Glove; Club of Villains

The Swagman is a supervillain in American comic books published by DC Comics. He is primarily an enemy of Batman and the Dark Ranger.

== Fictional character biography ==
Swagman begins his career as a criminal in Australia, often coming into conflict with the Dark Ranger of the Batmen of All Nations.

Sometime before the Batman R.I.P. storyline, Swagman is recruited by the Black Glove and joins the Club of Villains under the leadership of Simon Hurt. Swagman takes part in Hurt's plan to drive Batman insane. Hurt, who is aware of Batman's secret identity as Bruce Wayne, sends criminal Jezebel Jet to pose as a love interest for Bruce and weaken his mental state. The plan ultimately works and the Black Glove discovers the location of the Batcave. The Batcave is compromised by members of the Club of Villains and Bruce Wayne has a mental breakdown. However, Bruce had created a back-up personality which he buried in the back of his mind in case a situation like this ever occurred. His back-up personality kicks in and Bruce Wayne becomes the Batman of Zur-En-Arrh.

Unaware that Batman is no longer incapacitated, the Club of Villains begin targeting Batman's allies. Swagman is tasked with taking down Robin, but is unable to do so. The Batman of Zur-En-Arrh and members of the Club of Heroes track down the Club of Villains to their base. After a drawn out conflict, the Club of Villains are defeated and Batman returns to his former personality.

== Powers and abilities ==
Taking inspiration from famed Australian bushranger Ned Kelly, Swagman wields crude body armor and various weaponry, such as grenade launchers and swords.

Swagman as he appears in Batman: The Brave and the Bold.

== In other media ==
Swagman makes a non-speaking cameo appearance in the Batman: The Brave and the Bold episode "The Knights of Tomorrow!".

== See also ==
- Batmen of All Nations
- List of Batman family adversaries
- Batman R.I.P.
- Batman Incorporated
