= Superman & Batman: Generations =

Comic book series by DC Comics

- Cover of the trade paperback of Superman & Batman: Generations 2, art by John Byrne

Publication information
- Publisher: DC Comics
- Schedule: Monthly
- Format: Limited series
- Publication date: (1); January - April 1999 (2); August - November 2001 (3); March 2003 - February 2004
- No. of issues: (1 and 2); 4 (3); 12

Creative team
- Created by: John Byrne

Collected editions
- Generations: ISBN 1-56389-605-2
- Generations 2: ISBN 1563899906

Superman & Batman: Generations is the umbrella title of three Elseworlds comic book limited series published by DC Comics in the United States, written and illustrated by John Byrne. A major concept of the series is the avoidance of the floating timeline; it places Superman, Batman, and the other members of the DC Universe in a single timeline, showing the characters aging and being replaced by their progeny.

The Elseworlds story Batman & Captain America, co-published with Marvel Comics and written/drawn by John Byrne, was released in 1996. The story features Batman and Robin teaming up with Captain America and Bucky Barnes to fight the Joker and the Red Skull in 1945. The epilogue of the tale features Dick Grayson as Batman and Bruce Wayne Jr. as Robin. The duo find the frozen Captain America in the 1960s while searching for the Joker Jr. It is from this epilogue that the Generations concept was spun-off and developed.

== Publication history ==
Superman & Batman: Generations was published as a four-issue limited series in Prestige Format from January to April 1999.

Superman & Batman: Generations 2, like its predecessor, is a four-issue Prestige Format limited series that ran from October 2001 to January 2002; it dealt with other DC heroes in chapters set between the times of the stories in the first series.

Superman & Batman: Generations 3 is a 12-part limited series. Unlike the previous two series, it was published in standard format and ran from March 2003 to February 2004. No trade paperback has been published for this series as of this date.

== Plot summaries ==
=== Generations ===
Generations follows Superman and Batman from the beginning of their careers to the far future. Each issue contains two stories; each story takes places 10 years after the previous one.

- 1939: The Vigilantes — Superman and Batman meet for the first time at the Metropolis World's Fair, where they overcome their initial suspicions of each other to team up and defeat the Ultra-Humanite.
- 1949: Family Matters — Clark Kent is married to Lois Lane, and Bruce Wayne's ward Dick Grayson is leaving for college. Lex Luthor and the Joker kidnap the pregnant Lois. Batman and Superman defeat the villains and rescue Lois, but her unborn son is exposed to gold kryptonite, meaning he will never develop superpowers. The Kents decide to keep the knowledge of his heritage a secret from the boy. In an epilogue set in 1950, Bruce's wife is revealed to be expecting a child as well.
- 1959: Strange Days — Aliens in need of a champion ask Bat-Mite and Mister Mxyzptlk to test each other's respective heroes, but Batman and Superman trick the two imps into turning on each other and convince the aliens to take them instead. Batman and Superman also face the problems of age and family. Bruce shortly thereafter retires and Dick Grayson eventually takes over as Batman in the 1960s, while Bruce Wayne Jr. ("B.J.") trains to become the new Robin. When the Kents discover their daughter Kara is developing superpowers, they give her a red sun radiation necklace created by Superman so that Kara can live a normal life without her powers. In the closing panels, an aged Lex Luthor reveals to young Joel Kent the truth about his heritage.
- 1969: Changing Times — Kara Kent now helps her father as Supergirl, while Lois Kent is diagnosed with cancer, and Joel Kent is reported MIA in Vietnam. Dick Grayson, the new Batman, confronts the Joker Jr., who is actually an aged Joker in disguise. The Joker kills Grayson in an elaborate trap, but Bruce Wayne Jr. (the new Robin) switches uniforms with him so that the Batman legacy can continue, letting the public believe that the Joker killed Robin rather than Batman.
- 1979: Twilight of the Gods — Batman and Supergirl (or Superwoman as her father thinks of her) have become a heroic team and, as Bruce Wayne Jr. and Kara Kent, plan to marry. Lois is still alive, thanks to her physician Dr. Holurt. Bruce and Kara's wedding is disrupted by a super-powered Joel Kent, who is revealed to have faked his death in Vietnam. Joel attacks and violently kills Kara. Dr. Holurt reveals himself to be a disguised Lex Luthor; he shows the world that Clark Kent is Superman, then kills Lois. Joel's powers are the result of a serum created by Luthor but, as Luthor knows, the serum is unstable and Joel dies a few minutes after killing his sister. Superman learns that Joel had fathered a son with a young Vietnamese woman, and asks B.J. to raise the boy as his own while he searches for Luthor. Meanwhile, a 70-year-old Bruce Wayne, on the trail of Ra's al Ghul, is captured by his agents.
- 1989: Crime and Punishment — Bruce Wayne Jr., the third Batman, flies to the Fortress of Solitude to arrest Superman for murder. Superman had been hunting Luthor for the past 10 years and finally caught up with him. Luthor exposed Superman to gold kryptonite and revealed that he is really the Ultra-Humanite. In 1939, he transplanted his brain into the body of his assistant Lex Luthor after his rocket crashed while fleeing the 1939 World's Fair, his body and Luthor's brain were too badly damaged to survive unless the switch occurred. The Ultra-Humanite planned to move his brain into Superman's body, but Superman accidentally electrocuted him while trying to escape. As that happened, the villain's machines broadcast over worldwide television the video of Superman apparently murdering "Luthor" to frame him. In the present, Superman lets Bruce Jr. take him into custody so that he can plead guilty to murder before the World Court. Even though the judges point out that he acted in self-defense, Superman is not sure whether or not he might have been influenced by his hatred of Luthor and requests that he be sent into the Phantom Zone. The judges agree to a sentence of 10 years.
- 1999: Beginnings and Endings — Batman III is brought to Ra's al Ghul, who is revealed to be Bruce Wayne, Sr. In 1979 Wayne had entered a Lazarus Pit with Ra's al Ghul after Ra's discovered that, if two people entered the Pit, one would perish while the other would survive, gaining immortality and none of the accompanying madness. Wayne survived and discovered that Ra's was correct. In the years since, Wayne turned Ra's's criminal empire into a force for good, working so subtly that everyone assumed his actions were a front for a criminal scheme without realizing that the 'front' had become the real organization. Wayne asks Bruce Jr. to take over the operation while he returns as Batman. Batman frees Superman from the Phantom Zone, and they investigate the Ultra-Humanite's death. Based on what the villain said before he died, Batman surmises that Ultra-Humanite had perfected a cure for gold kryptonite's effects and planned to use it after transplanting his brain into Superman's body. Superman finds the antidote, which restores his powers, and after recreating it, he shares it with his grandson, Clark Wayne, a.k.a. Knightwing. Feeling that he is no longer needed now that there are so many other heroes, Superman leaves Earth in the hands of Batman and his grandson to protect the cosmos.
- 2919: Nineteen Twenty-Nine — Batman visits Superman in his Fortress of Solitude, now an asteroid in a distant galaxy. Due to Superman's Kryptonian heritage and Batman's Lazarus Pit treatment, the two have aged at a slow rate. As they reminisce, Superman recalls that they had met in 1929 as teenagers. Clark and Lois Lane were winners of a journalism contest held by Bruce Wayne, owner of the Gotham Gazette. While in Gotham City, Superboy joins forces with Bruce (wearing a prototype "Robin" costume) to defeat a gang of criminals led by the young Lex Luthor, the events also prompting Clark to relocate his plans to move to Gotham to move to Metropolis to follow Lois. In the present, the two heroes realize the galaxy has become a paradise under their protection and care. They decide to leave the galaxy as they left Earth and find a new galaxy with people in trouble they can help. They are joined by Lana Lang who, thanks to magical powers, has also gained a long life and married Superman.

=== Generations 2 ===
The second series, rather than using a 10-year jump between stories as in the original, takes jumps of 11 years. Starting in 1942, each issue again tells two stories, ending in the year 2019 at the end of issue #4. While the first series focused on the Batman and Superman families, the second features other characters from the DC Universe, especially from the Justice Society and Justice League.

- 1942: Battlefields — In Europe, Hawkman and the Blackhawks battle a giant Nazi robot. Green Lantern (Alan Scott) arrives, but exhausts his power ring saving Hawkman. The robot launches a rocket, which Blackhawk member Chuck stops at the cost of his life. Superman and the Spectre arrive, and disarm the robot. Superman rips open the machine to reveal the Ultra-Humanite, who uses kryptonite to hold him off and escape. Back in Gotham City, Lois Lane discovers that Luthor developed the robot and sold the plans to the Nazis. She is captured and held captive with Robin, but the two are saved by Batman, disguised as Luthor's henchman.
- 1953: Absent Friends — A long-missing Jim Gordon collapses in the doorway of Wayne Manor. He tells Bruce that he knows his secret identity, and warns him of a new threat: a mysterious criminal known as "the Head of the Demon". Meanwhile, Wonder Girl (a mystical projection of Wonder Woman) flies to North Korea in search of Steve Trevor's downed plane, while Diana Prince goes into labor. Wonder Girl finds Trevor, but he dies en route to Paradise Island. At the same moment Diana gives birth to a baby girl, Lois Kent gives birth to her daughter, Kara Kent. Clark arrives late; as Superman, he had been stranded on a planet with a red sun until he was rescued by Abin Sur. After attending the birth of his daughter, Superman introduces Sur to Alan Scott. The two Green Lanterns are puzzled at the similar nature of their rings which nevertheless possess different weaknesses.
- 1964: Children's Hour — Bruce Wayne Jr. is stopped by his mother from going out as Robin with Batman II, while Kara Kent tries on her Supergirl costume for the first time. She flies to Wayne Manor to see B.J., who is unhappy with his situation. Supergirl points out that he promised not to be Robin with Batman; he did not say anything about Supergirl. The teens fly off and find Kid Flash, who is fighting Weather Wizard and Mirror Master. When Kid Flash is knocked unconscious, Supergirl and Robin intervene, only to be knocked out by Gorilla Grodd. Meanwhile, Barry Allen calls Diana Trevor, looking for Kid Flash. Diana's daughter Stevie goes looking for Wally as the new Wonder Girl. She is drawn to a warehouse in Central City, where Gorilla Grodd is preparing to transfer the teens' superpowers into his body. Supergirl, who had been playing possum, rips apart the machines holding the teens, and the four young heroes subdue the criminals. Supergirl and Wonder Girl realize that they share a special bond due to being born at the same moment; this is what drew Wonder Girl to the warehouse. The teens decide to form a crimefighting team and, after rejecting the name "Junior Justice Society", call themselves the Justice League.
- 1975: Troubled Souls — Batman III is called to Arkham Asylum, where the Joker has been acting strangely. Surveillance tapes reveal that the Joker is being haunted by the ghost of Dick Grayson, who he killed in 1969. With the help of Doctor Occult, Deadman, and the ghost of Alfred Pennyworth, Grayson's spirit is convinced not to murder the Joker and goes into the light with Alfred. Bruce Wayne, in his Batman costume, visits the dying Joker, whose last request is to know the Batman's identity. Batman replies that, with all the pain that the Joker has caused, he deserves nothing, and leaves. In a subplot, test pilot Hal Jordan barely survives the flight of an experimental rocket plane and decides to retire and go into politics.
- 1986: To Hunt the Hunter — Superman tracks Luthor to his hideout, but discovers he is a computer simulation. The faux Luthor plays a hologram of Joel Kent killing Supergirl just to torment the Man of Steel. Meanwhile, Wonder Woman II, the Flash IV, and Green Lantern discuss Batman III, who has become violent and unstable since the death of Supergirl. The JLA reluctantly decide that they must stop Batman. They track down Batman and try to restrain him, but he overpowers them. While fighting, Batman becomes enraged and savagely beats a helpless Green Lantern. When the Flash IV screams that he is killing Green Lantern, Batman snaps out of his rage and flees to his home. There, he collapses in front of his wife Mei-Lei, crying for help.
- 1997: Turning Points — Batman III, before leaving in search of Ra's al Ghul, tells his son Clark Wayne that he must be Batman now. Clark reveals that he has known for some time he is adopted and that only a true Wayne can be Batman. Clark instead takes the identity of Knightwing. On patrol, Knightwing comes across a rampaging robot previously used by the villain Ransak. Knightwing struggles with the robot, while Superman watches helplessly from the Phantom Zone. At the last minute, Superman manages to briefly appear before Ransak, causing a distraction that allows Knightwing to short out the robot. Knightwing finds a young girl, the daughter of the real Ransak, inside the suit. Meanwhile, President Barbara Gordon and former President Hal Jordan meet to discuss a major threat. The renegade Green Lantern Sinestro has vowed to kill Jordan, who had turned down Alan Scott's offer to become Earth's new Green Lantern. The Flash IV, Green Lantern Kyle Rayner, and Blackhawk unsuccessfully try to stop Sinestro. Kyle flies to the White House, with Sinestro in pursuit. Sinestro arrives and blasts Scott, then prepares to kill Jordan. Jordan takes Kyle's ring and, reasoning that the ring's weaknesses are in the mind of the user, manages to defeat Sinestro. Jordan and his wife Carol Ferris are taken to Oa, where he accepts the role of Green Lantern.
- 2008: This Ancient Evil — Knightwing faces a threat from the past, a robot housing Lex Luthor's brain. He manages to defeat Luthor with the aid of Cyborg, the Flash V, and Green Lantern Hal Jordan (his youth restored by the power ring). Clark Wayne then leaves to marry Amanda Mason, the young girl that had once faced him as Ransak. Meanwhile, Bruce Wayne and Bruce Jr. visit the dying Mrs. Wayne in the hospital, where she tells them a secret (which is not revealed until Generations 3).
- 2019: 1920: Father to the Man — Batman and Knightwing visit the Fortress of Solitude, where Superman shows them the Chroniscope, a Kryptonian device that can view the past and future. Knightwing plays a message from Jonathan Kent recorded 99 years ago, that tells how he had used the Chroniscope and had seen the murder of Thomas and Martha Wayne. As the Waynes were scheduled to visit the county seat, Pa Kent decides to warn them. Before this can happen, the Waynes are kidnapped by the Ultra-Humanite. Bruce escapes and after disguising himself with a fox mask, helps Superboy stop the kidnappers, calling himself the Flying Fox (a kind of bat, something Superboy notes with glee). Kent then shows Thomas Wayne his future on the Chroniscope. Several weeks later, Pa Kent is shocked to read that the Waynes were murdered. Using the Chroniscope, he learns that the Waynes decided not to change the future, as their death was responsible for creating the Batman. In 2019, Superman consoles a stunned Bruce Wayne with the knowledge that his parents realized that they were creating a great force for good.

=== Generations 3 ===
Generations 3 starts in the year 1925, with each subsequent issue jumping forward 100 years, with the exception of issues #7 and 8, which both partially dealt with the 26th century and the 19th century, respectively. The story features characters from the future timelines of the DC Universe, as well as the New Gods.

- Century 20: Crosstime Crisis — In 1925, Clark Kent, Pete Ross, and Lana Lang are surprised when Saturn Girl bursts into the Kent home, looking for Superboy. A spaceship filled with strange armored creatures has crashed near Smallville. Superboy investigates and is attacked. The army, commanded by Sam Lane arrives. Young Bruce Wayne learns of the crash and flies to Smallville to help, while Lana and a young Lois Lane enter Saturn Girl's time machine. Superboy destroys the aliens with a device provided by Bruce. A dying Saturn Girl uses her powers to erase knowledge of the event from everyone's mind. The time machine returns to the future, with Lois and Lana aboard.
- Century 21: Doomsday Minus 1 — As Knightwing introduces his twin daughters Supergirl Red and Supergirl Blue, the robotic brain of Lex Luthor escapes. Superman is troubled by memories of an alien invasion in 1925 that no one remembers. He travels to New Genesis to confer with Highfather, but when he arrives, he sees the fire pits of Apokolips go out. The Supergirls and OMAC fight Luthor and his mysterious allies, but he gains the upper hand and neutralizes OMAC. Knightwing arrives, but Luthor's allies vanish before they can be caught. Luthor tells Knightwing that this is the day the world ends and detonates a bomb.
- Century 22: Out of the Ashes — 100 years ago, Luthor activated a device that prevents all power sources on Earth, or 1,000 miles above it, from being used. Civilization is in ruins and the survivors, led by Batman and his descendants, live in an underground complex. The surface is left to mutant animals and a few humans, including a man named Kamandi. Superman has not been seen in nearly 100 years. Knightwing, now posing as Superman, and the Supergirls are all that remain to fight the Parademons. Batman manages to revive the Brother Eye satellite. He has been keeping tabs on Kamandi, who is a descendant of Buddy Blank, a.k.a. OMAC, and plans to revive the One-Man Army Corps as a weapon against the Parademons.
- Century 23: Return of the Warrior — Stephanie Trevor, the second Wonder Woman, is fatally injured while fighting Parademons, and the Supergirls take her to Paradise Island. Her mother, now Queen of the Amazons, is unable to revive Stephanie with the Purple Ray. Angered over her daughter's death, Wonder Woman returns to fight the Parademons before they can destroy the OMACs. Meanwhile, stranded on New Genesis, Superman has married Beautiful Dreamer, who manages to unlock his memory of the 1925 invasion that Saturn Girl had repressed.
- Century 24: Family Secrets — As Bruce Wayne, Jr. lays dying, Batman tells Wonder Woman the reason for his son's longevity. As seen at the end of Generations 2, the dying Mrs. Wayne gives her son and ex-husband a tape to play that reveals Bruce is not B.J.'s father. Analyzing the tape, they deduce that it was recorded in London. B.J. uses the Lazarus Pit to become young enough to aid Batman, and they travel to London to meet Cyril Sheldrake, the former Squire. Cyril takes them to a recording studio, where they are attacked by one of the gangs infesting London. They manage to subdue the gang and listen to the tape, which reveals that B.J. is Bruce's son; Mrs. Wayne lied to trick B.J. into using the Lazarus Pit, something that he had refused to do before. As B.J. dies, the ghost of Kara Kent appears and takes his spirit to the afterlife.
- Century 25: Love in the Time of Apocalypse — On Apokolips, Darkseid is revived by DeSaad and other members of his elite guard. On Earth, Supergirl Blue is in love with Green Lantern Ator, but since her body is stuck at the physical age of 11, Ator is uncomfortable with the relationship. Several other Green Lanterns find the buried robot body of Lex Luthor, who goes on a rampage. While the Green Lanterns fight Luthor, Supergirl Blue uses gold kryptonite to remove her powers, allowing her to age. Ator manages to stop Luthor, but Luthor uploads his mind into the city's computer, leaving Ator with an atomic bomb about to detonate. Ator contains the explosion with his power ring, but is trapped inside with the radiation. The now-powerless Supergirl Blue must stand by and watch Ator die.
- Century 26: History Lesson (Part 1) — Metron opens a portal that returns Superman to Earth, where he is attacked by Supergirl Blue and a superpowered Batman. After Superman convinces them of his identity, Batman tells him what has happened. In addition to the Parademons returning every 100 years to attack Smallville, civilization had been destroyed by Luthor. At one point Luthor blanketed the Earth in green kryptonite radiation, killing Clark Wayne and Supergirl Red, and managed to destroy all the OMACs, including the original, Buddy Blank. Supergirl Blue uses Luthor's serum to restore her powers and convinces Batman to use it as well. The two find that they are immune to kryptonite and finally defeat Luthor. Superman takes Batman and Supergirl to Smallville, where they find the body of Saturn Girl. He tells them the answer to the Parademon attacks lie in the future and flies off to the 30th century.
- Century 19: History Lesson (Part 2) — Seconds after Superman leaves, Supergirl hears a signal from underground. She digs up a box which contains Superman. His attempt to reach the future was blocked and he was hurled into the late 19th century. There, he meets Mister Miracle (who is the sheriff of Smallville) and Metron, as well as a young Jonathan Kent. Kent is seeking revenge against Jonah Hex, a bounty hunter that Kent claims killed 14 innocent men. A young Martha Clark begs Kent not to face Hex, but Kent is determined. In a showdown, Hex easily disarms Kent, then breaks Kent's glasses instead of killing him. Just then, the criminal that Hex was hunting appears and fires at Hex. Hex kills the criminal, but the shot meant for Hex hits Martha instead. Superman forces Metron to bring a doctor to save Martha's life, but her injuries mean that she will never have children. Jonathan tells Martha that they will get married as soon as she is well. Metron tells Superman that he cannot reach the future under his own power and places him in a suspended animation chamber underground. Meanwhile, Darkseid reveals his greatest weapon: Parademons with the power of independent thought.
- Century 27: A Soldier's Story — During a Parademon attack on Earth, one is separated from his squad. He hides in a small house, where he meets the owner, an elderly blind woman. The Parademon tells her his history. Centuries ago, Apokolips was destroyed in the final battle between Orion and Darkseid. Darkseid's essence was preserved by special machinery hidden in the heart of the planet. When Darkseid was revived, he developed new Parademons with the ability to think for themselves. Their mission is to travel back in time to defeat the heroes of Earth. The old woman, actually Supergirl Blue, kills the Parademon so that no one will learn that they are sentient. In the future, the time machine with Lois and Lana finally materializes.
- Century 28: Gods and Monsters — On Earth, Batman and Supergirl Blue bury their son, Thomas. A dying Metron appears and gives Superman a device that will allow him one round trip to New Genesis. He activates it and is met by Lar-el and Vara, his children with Beautiful Dreamer. The Parademons attack, followed by Darkseid. All of the New Gods are killed, leaving only Superman and his children. Darkseid captures Beautiful Dreamer and kills Superman's children when they try to rescue her. Darkseid leaves, but not before breaking Beautiful Dreamer's neck. Superman returns to Earth to tell Batman what has happened.
- Century 29: Little Girls Lost — Lana Lang and Lois Lane arrive via time bubble in the Superman Museum in Smallville in the year 2825. They discover that Clark Kent is Superman and Lois will one day marry him. Outside, they stumble across Superman fighting a troop of Parademons. They are almost attacked, but are saved by Supergirl Blue. Batman realizes that they can use the time bubble to reach the final Parademon attack in 2925. The heroes first return the two girls to 1925 and rescue Saturn Girl. Superman has Saturn Girl wipe the memories of everyone for 1,000 miles before taking the time machine to the future. They land in 2925 as energy beams strike all around them.
- Century 30: Time and Time Again — With Darkseid's forces attacking the Earth, the heroes fan out. Supergirl Blue destroys a weapon called the Sky Scorcher, but is fatally injured. Dying, Supergirl Blue tells Batman that the only way to stop Darkseid is to destroy him just after his resurrection, changing the timeline. Superman, Batman, Wonder Woman and Green Lantern Jordan Kelley go back in time to Darkseid's space station. Green Lantern and Wonder Woman are killed, but Batman causes Granny Goodness to overload the station's power supplies. Superman attacks Darkseid, who fires his Omega Beams at the Man of Steel. Superman throws DeSaad into the beams and pummels Darkseid. The space station explodes, and the energy wave reboots the timeline. The new timeline is similar to that at the end of the first Generations, with no sign of Darkseid and the Earth at peace. Batman and Superman briefly recall Supergirl Blue, but the memory fades away.

== The Kent/Wayne family tree ==
The Kent/Wayne family tree

Over the course of the third series, Generations III, a dynasty is created that spans many centuries. Most of this is undone by the series' end.

For clarification:

- Mei Lei was originally called Mei-Lai.
- Lara Wayne was originally called Kara.
- The identity of Bruce Wayne's first wife, whom he married roughly six months after Superman and Batman clashed with Luthor and the Joker in 1949, was never revealed, but she is probably neither Talia al Ghul (whom Bruce did not meet until 1979) nor Catwoman (whom Bruce refers to as "retired" in 2019, while his first wife was on her deathbed in 2008).
- Clark Wayne was adopted by Bruce Wayne Jr. after the death of both Joel and Kara Kent.
- Although a seemingly incestuous relationship, Bruce Wayne and Lara Wayne are not blood-related.
- Only the original Superman and Batman survive, thanks to Kryptonian genes and immortality granted by the Lazarus Pit, respectively.

== Collected editions ==
Title	Material collected	Published date	ISBN
Superman & Batman: Generations	Superman & Batman: Generations #1-4	April 2000	978-1563896057
Superman & Batman: Generations 2	Superman & Batman: Generations II #1-4	September 2003	978-1563899904
Superman & Batman: Generations Omnibus	Superman & Batman: Generations #1-4, Superman & Batman: Generations II #1-4, Superman & Batman: Generations III #1-12	March 2021	978-1779509406

== See also ==
- Spider-Man: Life Story, a similar story written for Marvel Comics that depicts Spider-Man and other Marvel superheroes debut in the same year as their publications and age in real time.
