= Batmen of All Nations =

DC Comics team

Batmen of All Nations (also known as the Club of Heroes)

Publication information
- Publisher: DC Comics
- First appearance: Detective Comics #215 (January 1955)

Roster

Batmen of All Nations is a group of superheroes appearing in American comic books published by DC Comics. The characters were inspired by the superhero Batman to fight crime in their respective countries. The group first appeared in Detective Comics #215. Later the group was renamed the International Club of Heroes, often known as just the Club of Heroes. Post-Crisis on Infinite Earths, they were named the Dome (see Global Guardians) and were not inspired by Batman but the Justice Society of America.

== Publication history ==
Grant Morrison featured the Batmen of All Nations in their 2007 run on Batman (#667-669). Morrison revealed the modern period fates of the "Club of Heroes":

It was kind of neat looking at what could go wrong with Batman. The Italian guy who was a Mature type film hero has become this big, fat guy who loves eating and trades on his past glories as The Legionary. The Knight and The Squire are still active but it's a grownup Squire and The Knight has his own Squire. The Gaucho has become a serious Argentine superhero who is well respected—he's the real deal. Wingman, who Batman trained in the past is now really pissed off, and doesn't want to admit that Batman ever trained him because he wants to make his own way.
— Grant Morrison on 2007 plans for Batman.

== Organization history ==
Left to right (top row): The Musketeer and Dark Ranger. Middle row: El Gaucho with Raven Red and The Legionary. Bottom row: Man-Of-Bats, and Wingman. From Batman #667.

The Batmen of All Nations are an international group inspired by Batman to become superheroes themselves. Years later, Batman decided to hold the first meeting with his counterparts in Gotham City, training them in heroics and working with them. The group initially consists of Knight and Squire (from England), Man-Of-Bats and Little Raven (Sioux Native Americans); El Gaucho (from Argentina), Musketeer (from France; later replaced by Nightrunner), Legionary (Italy), Ranger (later Dark Ranger) and his sidekick Scout (from Australia), and Wingman (from Sweden)

In a three-issue story arc in Batman #667–669, the Batmen of All Nations are reunited on John Mayhew's island resort in the Caribbean. The heroes are confronted with a disturbing video showing Simon Hurt, purportedly wearing the severed skin of Mayhew over his face. On behalf of the Black Glove organization, he challenges the club as representatives of 'good' against his 'evil', destroying their means of transport and threatening to kill them all.

Knight reveals the reason that the club originally disbanded and never succeeded as an international superteam: after losing Batman's commitment, the club was brought down by scandal when the original Knight discovered that Mayhew had killed his wife and framed Mangrove Pierce, an actor with whom she had been having an affair, for her death. Cast out of the team for his accusations, Knight lost focus and was murdered by Spring-Heeled Jack; the other heroes went their separate ways, their faith in Mayhew and the team as a whole similarly shattered.

Batman, the Gaucho, and Dark Ranger appear to be the last ones left alive, but Batman realizes that Dark Ranger is in fact Wingman, having swapped suits with the real Ranger and faked his own death. Wingman has been working with Mayhew to do the bidding of the Black Glove, having always been jealous of Batman's prowess. Despite injuring Gaucho, Wingman is defeated by Gaucho and killed by Gaucho's archenemy, El Sombrero.

As El Sombrero escapes the island, Batman follows him to unmask him as John Mayhew, whose death was also faked by the Black Glove. Mayhew reveals his motivation behind joining the Black Glove and gambling with lives is his boredom at being an aimless socialite; he appears to escape via an ejector seat, leaving his helicopter for Batman to use to rescue the survivors of the Club of Heroes. Mayhew is summarily killed by the Black Glove.

== Members ==
- Batman and his sidekick Robin (United States)
- Man-Of-Bats and his sidekick Little Raven (US – Sioux Indian)
- El Gaucho (Argentina)
- The Knight and his sidekick the Squire (England)
- The Musketeer (later replaced by the Nightrunner) (France)
- The Legionary (Italy)
- The Ranger (later the Dark Ranger) and his sidekick the Scout (Australia)
- Wingman (Sweden)

== Club of Villains ==
In the storyline "Batman R.I.P.", the Batman family fights against the Club of Villains, a group assembled by Black Glove to destroy Batman, followed by the remaining Club of Heroes members. The club was composed of:

- Simon Hurt: A deranged psychiatrist heading the Black Glove to destroy Batman, body and soul. He claims to be Thomas Wayne and wears the Bat-suit that Bruce's father once wore to a costume party.
- Le Bossu (Guy Dax): A French villain dressed as a hunchback, with henchmen dressed as gargoyles, whose real identity is brilliant neurosurgeon and 'family man' Guy Dax. He admires the Joker until the Joker disfigures him with a razor. Bossu sees his disfigurement as an opportunity to give up his old life and become a sadistic monster permanently.
- Pierrot Lunaire: A foe of the Musketeer who dresses as the Commedia dell'arte character Pierrot. Owing to the tradition of mimes, he never speaks.
- King Kraken: A masked deep-sea diver who wields a high-voltage electric rifle.
- Charlie Caligula: A madman whose schemes are inspired by Julius Caesar and the Roman Empire.
- El Sombrero: A lunatic in a luchador mask who designs deathtraps for anyone who is willing to pay.
- Jezebel Jet: A wealthy woman of African descent who had lost her parents. She is said to own an African province. Pretended to be in love with Batman, though Batman told her to thank Alfred for his acting lessons when the topic was brought up between the two.
- Scorpiana: A sultry assassin who uses a blue scorpion as her calling card.
- Swagman: A gunman who speaks in an Australian accent and wears a costume based on the clothes of Australian bandit Ned Kelly.
- The Joker was briefly recruited by the club as the maître for Batman's danse macabre.

== Other versions ==
=== Kingdom Come ===
An alternate universe iteration of the Batmen of All Nations appears in Kingdom Come, consisting of Cossack, Samurai, Dragon, and Batwoman.

=== International Delegation of Masked Archers ===
The International Delegation of Masked Archers (also known as The Green Arrows Of The World) were a similar group based on Green Arrow rather than Batman. They appeared in Adventure Comics #250 (July 1958), in a story similar to the Detective Comics story that introduced the Batmen of All Nations. The members included:

- Ace Archer (Japan)
- Bowman of Britain (United Kingdom)
- Bowman of the Bush (Africa)
- Green Arrow (America)
- Phantom (France)
- Unidentified Green Arrows of Austria, Italy, Mexico, Saudi Arabia, and Spain

=== International Sea Devils ===
The International Sea Devils were a similar group based on a team known as the Sea Devils:

- Miguel (South America)
- Molo (Africa)
- Sikki (India)

== In other media ==
The Batmen of All Nations appear in the Batman: The Brave and the Bold episode "Powerless!", with Musketeer voiced by Diedrich Bader, El Gaucho by Jeff Bennett, and Legionnaire by John DiMaggio, while Knight, Ranger, Wingman, and Impala have no dialogue. In the episode, the Batmen of All Nations battle the "Jokers of All Nations", formed by the Joker and consisting of unnamed Jokerized versions of an Inuk, a Canadian hockey player, a Scotsman, a Cossack, and a Sumo wrestler. Additionally, the Club of Villains make a non-speaking appearance in the episode "The Knights of Tomorrow!", consisting of Pierrot Lunaire, El Sombrero, Swagman, King Kraken, Charlie Caligula, and Scorpiana.
