= Batman Incorporated =

American comic book series by DC Comics

- Cover of Batman Incorporated vol. 2, #1, art by Chris Burnham.

Group publication information
- Publisher: DC Comics
- First appearance: Batman and Robin No. 16 (November 2010)
- Created by: Grant Morrison; Cameron Stewart; Frazer Irving

In-story information
- Type of organization: Team
- Leader(s): Batman
- Agent(s): Nightwing – Gotham City; Robin – Gotham City; Red Hood – Gotham City; Red Robin – worldwide Oracle – World Wide Web; Batwoman – Gotham City; Batwing – Tinasha; KingBat; NightRunner

Batman Incorporated
- : Variant cover of Batman, Inc. #1 (November 2010, DC Comics), published in a 1:25 ratio; art by Yanick Paquette, pencils, Michel Lacombe, inks, and Nathan Fairbairn, color

Series publication information
- Schedule: Monthly
- Format: Ongoing series
- Genre: Superhero
- Publication date: Vol. 1: November 2010 – December 2011; Vol. 2: May 2012 – July 2013; Vol. 3: October 2022 – September 2023
- Number of issues: Vol. 1: 8 (+1 prestige format one-shot); Vol. 2: 13 (plus a zero issue and 1 prestige format one-shot); Vol. 3: 12

Creative team
- Writer(s): Grant Morrison; Ed Brisson
- Artist(s): Yanick Paquette; Scott Clark; Cameron Stewart; Chris Burnham; John Timms
- Inker(s): Michel Lacombe; Scott Clark/Dave Beaty
- Creator(s): Grant Morrison; Cameron Stewart; Frazer Irving
- Editor(s): Mike Marts; Janelle Siegel

Collected editions
- Batman Incorporated Deluxe Edition, Volume 1: ISBN 1-4012-3212-4

Batman Incorporated (also known as Batman, Inc.) is an American comic book series published by the comic book publishing company DC Comics, featuring the superhero Batman. Written by Grant Morrison, the series debuted following the events of Batman R.I.P, Final Crisis, Batman and Robin, and The Return of Bruce Wayne where, after being stranded in the distant past and believed dead, Bruce Wayne has returned to the present day DC Universe. Now, he is prepared to take his war on crime to the next level by essentially "franchising" it and drafting, training, and commanding a global team of heroes who will answer to Batman himself, known as Batman Incorporated.

In the series, one of the primary themes present is Batman traveling across the world seeking to use the symbolic power that the Batman has on a global scale. For the first volume of the series, Wayne is featured wearing a new costume designed by David Finch, to further distinguish him from Dick Grayson, who was still operating as Batman before the DC Universe relaunch. After the relaunch, Wayne was again the only character serving as Batman and would be shown wearing the costume that first premiered in August 2011's Justice League #1, designed by DC Comics Co-Publisher Jim Lee. In the wake of the relaunch of the DC Universe under The New 52 initiative, the first volume of Batman Incorporated came to an end in December 2011. In May 2012, the series returned with a new first issue, continuing the narrative of the first series while incorporating the altered elements of DC Universe continuity and characters into the new series.

== Publication history ==
Batman, Inc. is the direct continuation from Morrison's previous work with the Batman character, following the stories Batman and Son, The Resurrection of Ra's al Ghul, The Black Glove, R.I.P., Final Crisis, Batman and Robin and The Return of Bruce Wayne. After the October one-shot Batman: The Return, Inc. represents Bruce Wayne's first foray into the present-day DC Universe since December 2008's Final Crisis #6, when he was stranded in the distant past by Darkseid's Omega Sanction. The Return one-shot features the debut of a new costume for Bruce Wayne, designed by artist David Finch.

Morrison described their new take on Bruce Wayne as a "zen billionaire" and stated that Batman, Incorporated is "an attempt to reimagine what a good corporation can be." Batman group editor Mike Marts elaborated on the overall theme of the new title: "Grant Morrison, if he's writing Batman or he's writing Batman & Robin or he's writing Batman Inc., his storylines will deal with the big concepts and the epic storyline, and the multi-layered, bigger story. That's Grant's strong point. So that's what Batman Inc. is about. It's about expanding the Batman universe and the Batman line and the Batman cast of characters".

In interviews, Morrison has stated that the animated series, Batman: The Brave and the Bold was a major influence on the premise and tone of the book. The 1969 film The Magic Christian was similarly inspirational. In an interview with Wired, Morrison stated that one of their goals with the series was to "capture the feeling of [playing] Batman: Arkham Asylum".

The first story arc contains several references to the Batman manga from the 1960s, and even reintroduces Lord Death Man (a villain who appeared in the manga after its introduction as Death Man in the American comic) into the mainstream DC continuity. In addition, a new protagonist named Jiro Osamu is introduced as the sidekick of Mr. Unknown, the Batman of Tokyo.

As for the commercial nature of Batman, Inc., Morrison said that they were inspired by real-life tools used to market the image of the title character: "I was looking back at the old Tim Burton Batman movie in 1989, and the way they played that symbol, it was such a major merchandising tool. So I wanted to do something that represented that, or echoed that. So Batman Inc. is the notion of Batman taking the symbol and saying, 'let's form an international army or team, or police force, which is endorsed by Batman and wears Batman's symbol'".

In order to finish the series' first volume, Grant Morrison wrote and Cameron Stewart and Chris Burnham penciled a giant sized one-shot titled Batman Incorporated: Leviathan Strikes!

=== The New 52 ===
In September 2011, The New 52 rebooted DC's continuity. DC Comics began a spin-off series starring Batwing as a part of the relaunch. Batwing was one of the original titles of the New 52, premiering before Batman, Incorporated (vol. 2).

DC Comics relaunched Batman, Incorporated with issue #1 in May 2012, written again by Grant Morrison and penciled by Chris Burnham, as part of the "Second Wave" of DC's company-wide title relaunch, the New 52. Though technically taking place in the newly rebooted DC Universe, the series makes extensive references to the prior continuity. Stories such as Grant Morrison's first JLA arc ("New World Order") and Metamorpho's tenure in the Justice League as a part of the Justice League International are referenced.

DC Batman-line editor Mike Marts confirmed that elements of Morrison's previous run on the Batman and Batman and Robin titles (in addition to Incorporated's first volume) are still a part of the continuity of the New 52, with major storylines Batman and Son, Batman R.I.P., Batman: Reborn, and The Return of Bruce Wayne all still forming the backbone of the recent history of the characters. This is further emphasized by the first issue of the second volume, mentioning Bruce's disappearance and return as well as Dick Grayson and Damian serving as Batman and Robin. The series ended with issue #13 in July 2013. A final Batman Incorporated Special #1 was published in August.

=== Infinite Frontier ===
A new ongoing Batman Incorporated series, written by Ed Brisson and illustrated by John Timms, was released in 2022, spinning out of the Batman run by James Tynion IV. Aside from returning members of Batman Inc., Batman appointed Ghost-Maker, a vigilante and his old friend/rival introduced in Tynion IV's run, as the new leader of the team. The first arc centers around the serial murder of Batman and Ghost-Maker's old mentors.

== Fictional team history ==
Batman, Inc. features various global locales as Bruce Wayne searches the globe for "Batmen" to recruit in his new endeavor.

=== Characters ===
Because of the global nature of this series, Grant Morrison has gone on record saying that many of the characters used will be both new and old, and will include previously seen characters such as Knight and Squire, that will contribute to the cause of Batman, Inc. Morrison also said that there will be a different primary representative from England: "There's another Batman of England, who is not the Knight. I discovered there was another character called The Hood used more recently in Batman: Shadow of the Bat. Once I discovered that character, a new idea kind of spun off and it gave me a whole bunch of villains and new stuff to bring in. So yeah, doing the research for it [led to] discovering some obscure characters, including some quite recently from the nineties even. No one looks at the nineties but there's some interesting stuff there".

Morrison also stated that they will revisit El Gaucho in a trip that the Dark Knight takes to recruit a representative from Argentina. Kate Kane, the current Batwoman, appeared in issue four, with her predecessor Kathy Kane featuring very heavily in flashback sequences in the same issue.

In issue five, Batwing, the Batman from a yet-unnamed North African country, is introduced. Nightrunner, the controversial French Muslim vigilante introduced in Detective Comics Annual #12, appeared in Batman Inc. #6, acting as the representative of Paris, France. In the same issue, Cassandra Cain, the former Batgirl prior to the mantle being passed to Stephanie Brown, was introduced as Hong Kong's Batman Inc. representative under the new moniker of Black Bat.

=== Volume 1 (2010–2011) ===
Morrison employed tight, three-issue story arcs in Batman and Robin, and when asked if this is a trend they would be continuing, they said: "Yeah, but it's going to be even different again. It's going to be even more stripped back and pulpy and fast-moving. So the first one's only two. It's really tight. It's like reading about six issues in two. I'm very pleased with the way we've been able to cut this...we want to do very short, punchy stories in it. We may do some that are only one issue, and some that are three issues. And that will be the first year of the book. I call it the first season. It will be 12 issues of one- or two-part stories".

The current storyline sees Batman and his allies fighting a mysterious criminal organization called Leviathan (with the name borrowed from the book of the same name).

Mr. Unknown Is Dead (issues #1–2)

Bruce Wayne is taking the institution of Batman global. At the beginning of this series, he's enlisted the help of Catwoman to help him steal a special diamond from the armory of Doctor Sivana in Tokyo, Japan while attempting to recruit a hero called Mr. Unknown to become the Japanese "Batman" of Batman Incorporated. For Bruce and Selina, a villain named Lord Death Man has murdered Mr. Unknown, changing Bruce's plans in the region. While Mr. Unknown's body double, a young boy, has escaped, the forces of Lord Death Man have tracked him down and are ready to kill him before Batman and Catwoman arrive on the scene to assist in opposing Lord Death Man's forces. At the climax of the battle, Jiro pulls out a gun and shoots Lord Death Man through the chest, sending him flying out of a window to his apparent death.

However, Lord Death Man – as his name implies – cannot be killed; he awakens in a morgue and murders the doctors. He and his forces take cars and drive to the Maritime Museum, where Batman and Catwoman follow. In the museum, Batman fights Lord Death Man while Jiro (as the new Mr. Unknown) saves Aquazon from Lord Death Man's forces. Bruce later reveals to Selina that Jiro faked his own death, and he gave Jiro a three-month probation period to be Tokyo's Batman and a member of Batman Incorporated. Batman later places the immortal Lord Death Man in a rocket ship and fires him into space.

Scorpion Tango (issues #3–5)

Batman then travels to Argentina in an attempt to recruit El Gaucho into Batman Incorporated. Gaucho refuses, wanting to be his own man. Gaucho informs Batman of a case involving three missing children and a link to a mysterious manipulative figure called Doctor Dedalus. On the trail of the three children Batman and El Gaucho are led into a death trap by El Sombrero and Scorpiana in which they must fight to the death to save the missing children.

Batman and El Gaucho escape the trap but both learn of Gaucho's link to Kathy Kane, the original Batwoman. Batwoman was hired by the 'unrepentant Nazi war criminal' and former superspy Doctor Dedalus to learn Batman's secret identity. Kane fell in love with Bruce Wayne after becoming Batwoman and left him. The new Batwoman Kate Kane learns of Dedalus's location in the Falkland Islands where he was imprisoned by a team of British heroes claiming to have made a 'ring around the world' in the form of an unknown master plan.

Batman, Batwoman, and El Gaucho converge on Dedalus's location and meet a British superspy known as The Hood (having been sent in secret to infiltrate Batman, Inc.) where they discover Dedalus had discovered an unknown fifth element known as Ouroboros and had set a 'meta bomb' to destroy the island. Batman uses the batplane to blow up the bomb and then deduces that Dedalus is suffering from Alzheimer's disease and has escaped the island to finish his master plan using the supervillain group known as Leviathan. Batwing is then seen working with Batman to track Leviathan's activities in Africa.

==== The Leviathan Strikes ====
The Leviathan Strikes one-shot's story was split between two chapters, with the first focusing on Stephanie Brown's infiltration of an all-girls school that doubles as a training ground for the Leviathan organization. Due to The New 52, this would be Stephanie's final appearance as Batgirl. The second half focused on Bruce, Dick, Tim Drake, and Damian going up against a Leviathan operative named Doctor Dedalus. In the closing moments of the story, it is revealed that the mastermind behind Leviathan's operation is none other than Talia al Ghul, Damian's mother and daughter of Ra's al Ghul.

=== Volume 2 (2012–2013) ===
==== Demon Star ====
The second volume of the series began with a flash forward of Bruce Wayne being arrested by the Gotham City Police Department, with Batman ordering Alfred to shut down Batman Incorporated after a series of events yet to be seen. It then cuts to the present, as Bruce and Damian struggle to deal with Talia's plot to take over Gotham through the vast network of Leviathan agents throughout the city. To protect Damian (who has a bounty on his head), Batman allows Talia to think that Damian has been killed by a taxi driver/amateur assassin Goatboy, who is then given membership into the League of Assassins, alongside the Sportsmaster and Merlyn. When he is tasked with killing Matches Malone (Batman's undercover identity) he draws the wrath of the entire Batman Incorporated group upon the League. Afterwards, Batman declares that he needs Damian to return to his mother in order to infiltrate Leviathan, citing the bounty on his son's head and that the only place he would be safe from it would be alongside his mother.

==== Gotham's Most Wanted ====
Leviathan invades Gotham City, using indoctrinated children to attack it from the inside out. Damian goes up against Talia's bodyguard known as the Heretic. The Heretic reveals himself to be Damian's artificially-modified clone and kills Damian. As Bruce tries to deal with the loss of his son, Gotham demands that Wayne Enterprises cease funding Batman Incorporated to avoid being targeted by further international threats. Bruce salvages the remaining resources from Batman Inc. and uses them to launch a one-man war on Leviathan. He defeats the Heretic, who is later killed by Talia, before confronting Talia herself. Meanwhile, Nightwing, Red Robin, the new Wingman (a redeemed Jason Todd) and the new Knight (formerly the Squire) encounter the head of the mysterious organization known as Spyral. Talia and Batman cross swords in the Batcave, but before Batman can defeat her, Talia is shot by Kathy Kane: the former Batwoman and current head of Spyral. Kathy vanishes immediately afterwards and Bruce is called in for questioning by the police. He tells Gordon his reasons for joining with Batman, who has vanished after the Leviathan army was dispelled.

The story concludes with Gordon musing on his suspicions of Bruce and Batman being the same person, while Batman comes out of hiding and goes back to fighting crime some time later. Meanwhile, Ra's al Ghul has taken the bodies of Talia and Damian and has prepared an army of Damian clones, potentially succeeding where Darkseid failed in Final Crisis by using Batman as a progenitor for an unstoppable army.

=== Volume 3 (2022–2023) ===
Following the events of Batman Annual (vol. 3) #1, Batman appoints Ghost-Maker as the new leader of Batman Incorporated, reforming the organization as an international network of operatives tasked with combating global threats. Alongside members including Clownhunter, Raven Red, Knight, Dark Ranger, Gray Wolf, and others, Ghost-Maker investigates the murder of Professor Pyg, which leads the team to Phantom-One, the former mentor of both Batman and Ghost-Maker. Phantom-One has assembled his own organization of Bat-inspired operatives who believe Batman's moral code is a weakness and seek to replace Batman Incorporated through a campaign of targeted assassinations. As Ghost-Maker confronts his former teacher and the consequences of his own past training, Batman Incorporated battles Phantom-One's agents across several countries while preventing the group from discrediting Batman's network.

The conflict culminates in Ghost-Maker defeating Phantom-One but refusing to kill him, reaffirming the principles of Batman Incorporated. Following Phantom-One's defeat, Ghost-Maker continues leading the organization as it undertakes new international missions.

== Collected editions ==
Title	Material collected	Published date	ISBN
Batman Incorporated, Vol. 1	Batman Incorporated (vol. 1) #1–8, Batman Incorporated: Leviathan Strikes! #1	April 2012	978-1401232122
Batman Incorporated Vol. 1: Demon Star	Batman Incorporated (vol. 2) #0–6	December 2013	978-1401242633
Batman Incorporated Vol. 2: Gotham's Most Wanted	Batman Incorporated (vol. 2) #7–13, Batman Incorporated Special #1	September 2014	978-1401246976
Absolute Batman Incorporated	Batman Incorporated (vol. 1) #1–8, Batman Incorporated: Leviathan Strikes! #1, Batman Incorporated (vol. 2) #0-13, Batman Incorporated Special #1	January 2015	978-1401251215
Batman by Grant Morrison Omnibus Volume 3	Batman Incorporated (vol. 1) #1-8, Batman Incorporated: Leviathan Strikes! #1, Batman Incorporated (vol. 2) #0-13, Batman Incorporated Special #1, Batman: The Return #1	September 2020	978-1779502711
Batman Incorporated Vol. 1: No More Teachers	Batman Incorporated (vol. 3) #1-7, Batman 2022 Annual #1	September 12, 2023	978-1779518323
Batman Incorporated Vol. 2: Joker Incorporated	Batman Incorporated (vol. 3) #8-12	March 5, 2024	978-1779518330

== In other media ==
=== Television ===
A vigilante group loosely based on Batman Incorporated appears in Young Justice: Outsiders, consisting of Batman, Batwoman, Green Arrow, Plastic Man, Katana, Hardware, Metamorpho, Robin, Spoiler, Arrowette, and Orphan. Initially members of the Justice League, they publicly resign in response to U.N. secretary general Lex Luthor's restrictions on the League's actions so they can operate against Luthor's group, the Light. By the end of the series, Batman Inc. rejoins the League.

=== Video games ===
- The Batman Incorporated Batsuit from the series' first volume appears as a downloadable alternate skin for Batman in Batman: Arkham City.
- The Batman Incorporated Batsuit appears as an alternate skin for Batman in Batman: Arkham Knight.
