= Brat Pack (comics) =

Comic book series by Rick Veitch

- Cover of the 2003 Brat Pack trade paperback. Art by Rick Veitch.

Publication information
- Publisher: King Hell Press
- Schedule: Monthly
- Format: Limited series
- Genre: Superhero
- Publication date: August 1990 – May 1991
- No. of issues: 5
- Main characters: Black October: Midnight Mink & Chippy; Judge Jury & Kid Vicious; Moon Mistress & Luna; King Rad & Wild Boy

Creative team
- Created by: Rick Veitch
- Written by: Rick Veitch
- Artist: Rick Veitch
- Letterer: Gary Fields

Collected editions
- Brat Pack: Heroes From Hell: ISBN 0-9624864-4-2

Brat Pack is a comic book limited series by Rick Veitch (self-published under the company name King Hell Press). It is a dark satire on superhero sidekicks, influenced partly by the publicity stunt in which readers voted to kill off Batman's sidekick Jason Todd, but also built on other long-standing rumors and undercurrents in the history of the superhero genre, prominently commercialism, violence, and the fascist tendencies inherent in heroes.

== Plot ==
The residents of Slumburg, Pennsylvania are venting about their dislike for Chippy, the pink leather-clad sidekick of the gay superhero Midnight Mink. Dr. Blasphemy challenges the host of a local radio program to hold a call-in radio poll: if a majority votes for Chippy and his fellow superhero sidekicks to die, then Dr. Blasphemy will carry out the will of the people and murder them. Most of the general public call in to vote for the murder of the sidekicks.

Meanwhile, Chippy talks with a local priest about the cruelty of the heroes that he and his friends work for. Leaving the confessional chamber, a young altar boy named Cody notices the teen hero leave and realizes that his priest knows the heroes.

That evening, a sudden explosion kills three of the sidekicks and horribly disfigures Chippy. Horribly maimed, Chippy goes into hiding.

The four heroes whose sidekicks were killed, known collectively as Black October, have licensed their images to various corporations for profit; however, their contracts state that they must have teen sidekicks. They order Father Dunn to find replacement sidekicks. Cody offers himself as the new Chippy.

As the series progress, the four heroes systematically break their young charges mentally and physically. By the end, all four teen heroes are irrevocably broken mentally, just like their predecessors. Meanwhile, Cody finds himself repeatedly visiting Father Dunn. He reveals that all three of his fellow sidekicks hate and despise him. He further states that he has become disaffected with the life of a hero.

Dr. Blasphemy reveals that the kids are pawns of corporate America: they require the psychopathic heroes have teen sidekicks to make them appear wholesome to the masses. Blasphemy then reveals that the superheroes murdered their sidekicks' parents so they would not have to split the money from the merchandise deals. In one document, Chippy discovers a clause stating that when the sidekicks come of legal age, the heroes must start splitting the proceeds from their merchandise/media deals with their sidekicks. Chippy realizes that the superheroes were responsible for the bomb blast that killed their original sidekicks, all of whom were on the verge of turning 18. However, before they can do anything, a bomb is dropped on the church from a plane flown by Black October.

Father Dunn hangs himself in the bell tower. Suddenly, the electrical storm reaches its peak as long-lost superhero True-Man returns and murders his former friends by trapping them under the church bell which he melts on top of them. It is revealed that Dr. Blasphemy is King Rad's butler. The final shot shows the church in ruins as the radio declares a state of emergency and tells everyone to stay indoors until the lightning storm is over.

== Reception ==
Brat Pack is Rick Veitch/King Hell's top-selling title, with the fourth edition selling out in late 2007. Veitch released a fifth edition in 2009. Comics reporter Heidi MacDonald considers Brat Pack the third part of "the troika of immortal works dissecting the superhero genre, with the other two being Dark Knight and Watchmen. Indeed, for those brave readers looking for a follow-up to Watchmen, Brat Pack could be just the thing."

In 1992, Brat Pack was nominated for the "Best Finite Series" Eisner Award.

== Adaptations ==
In 2010, Brat Pack was optioned by ARS Nova, the producers of Black Dynamite. The film was never made.
