= Jack Flag =

Marvel Comics character

- Cover art to Thunderbolts #111, by Marko Djurdjevic.

Publication information
- Publisher: Marvel Comics
- First appearance: Captain America #434 (Dec. 1994)
- Created by: Mark Gruenwald (writer); Dave Hoover (artist)

In-story information
- Alter ego: Jack Harrison
- Team affiliations: Guardians of the Galaxy
- Partnerships: Captain America
- Abilities: Skilled athlete and martial artist Superhuman strength, stamina and durability

Jack Flag (Jack Harrison) is a superhero appearing in American comic books published by Marvel Comics. He has occasionally appeared alongside Captain America and has been a member of the Guardians of the Galaxy.

== Publication history ==
He first appeared in Captain America #434 (Dec. 1994), and was created by Mark Gruenwald and Dave Hoover.

== Fictional character biography ==
Jack and his brother, Drake, are members of Captain America's computer hotline network. Together, they create a citizen's patrol group in their hometown of Sandhaven, Arizona. Several criminals attack Drake, leaving him unable to use his legs. After the attack, Jack and Drake discover that the Serpent Society have infiltrated their hometown and attempt to contact the local authorities, only to learn that the Society has bribed them. Jack, unhappy with this information, begins training in martial arts and weight lifting so that he can fight the Society on his own.

During a bank robbery, Jack intervenes and battles Rock Python and Fer-de-Lance, members of the Serpent Society. Shortly after this, Jack attempts to infiltrate the Society, but King Cobra does not fully trust Jack. King Cobra sends Jack to steal a painting from Mister Hyde, who severely beats Jack. During the battle, Jack is drenched in Hyde's chemicals and develops superhuman physical abilities. Jack easily defeats Hyde and retrieves the painting. Before returning the painting to King Cobra, Jack contacts Captain America's hotline and informs them that the Society is in Sandhaven, allowing them to stop the Society.

=== Civil War ===
During the Civil War storyline, Jack Flag is shown to be living a civilian life with his girlfriend Lucy in Cleveland, Ohio, but refuses to either register or throw out his suit and weapons on the basis of the Superhuman Registration Act being "un-American". Growing frustrated with the police's slow response and lack of action about crime in his area, Flag intervenes when a woman is attacked outside his apartment building. Because of this, Flag is targeted by the Thunderbolts and arrested for violating the Superhuman Registration Act. He is attacked by Bullseye, leaving him paralyzed. Flag escapes prison with the Guardians of the Galaxy and joins the group during the "War of Kings" storyline.

=== Captain America: Steve Rogers ===
Jack Flag returns to Earth and is recruited by Steve Rogers to join S.H.I.E.L.D. and combat Hydra. He and Free Spirit aid Captain America in dealing with Baron Zemo and his "New Masters". However, Flag ignores Captain America's orders to stay with Free Spirit and goes after Zemo himself. Captain America confronts Flag and throws him off a plane, seriously injuring him and rendering him comatose. Rogers attempts to kill Flag by injecting him with poison, but Free Spirit arrives and tells him that his family decided to disconnect him from life support.

== Powers and abilities ==
After being drenched with Mr. Hyde's chemicals, Jack Flag gained superhuman strength, stamina, and durability. He is also a martial artist and athlete.

== In other media ==
Jack Flag makes a cameo appearance in Marvel's Guardians of the Galaxy as an inmate of the Rock prison.
