= Knight (DC Comics) =

DC Comics character

The Knight
- Percival Sheldrake

Publication information
- Publisher: DC Comics
- First appearance: (Percy); Batman #62 (December 1950) (Cyril); JLA #26 (February 1999)
- Created by: (Percy); Bill Finger (writer); Dick Sprang (artist) (Cyril); Grant Morrison (writer); Howard Porter (artist)

In-story information
- Alter ego: Percival Sheldrake; Cyril Sheldrake; Beryl Hutchinson
- Species: Human
- Place of origin: England
- Team affiliations: (Percy); Young Allies; Batmen of All Nations (Cyril); Ultramarine Corps; Global Guardians; Club of Heroes; Batman Incorporated (Beryl); Batman Incorporated
- Notable aliases: The Squire
- Abilities: Swordsmanship, martial artist, outfitted in magical armor that repels swords and light projectiles.

The Knight is the name of three comic book superheroes who are properties of DC Comics.

Percival Sheldrake debuted as the Knight in Batman #62 (December 1950), and was created by Bill Finger and Dick Sprang. Cyril Sheldrake debuted as the Knight in JLA #26 (February 1999), and was created by Grant Morrison and Howard Porter. Beryl Hutchinson first appeared as Squire in the same issue, and became the Knight in Batman Incorporated v2 #09 (March 2013).

== Publication history ==
=== Percival Sheldrake ===
The first Knight first appeared in Batman #62 (Dec 1950/Jan 1951) in a story entitled "The Batman of England!" He is a British vigilante who models himself after the Knights of the Round Table, and also gentleman detective after the Batman, including having a teenage sidekick, the Squire. He is Percy Sheldrake, Earl of Wordenshire, and the Squire is his son Cyril. Instead of a Bat-Signal he is summoned by ringing the Wordenshire church bell. The Knight is a member of the Batmen of All Nations—also known as the Club of Heroes—an international team of superheroes whose careers were inspired by Batman's example.

It is later revealed that Percy had begun his heroic career as squire to the first Shining Knight during World War II. Percy was murdered by the villain Spring Heeled Jack. His son Cyril, the former Squire, assumed the mantle.

=== Cyril Sheldrake ===
The second Knight first appears in a group shot of the Ultramarine Corps at the end of JLA #26 (Feb 1999). The subsequent appearance of the Corps in JLA Classified establishes that he is Cyril Sheldrake, who inherited both the title of Earl and that of the Knight when his father was killed by his arch-enemy, Springheeled Jack. The burden of taking up his father's duties results in Cyril turning to drink and gambling, and he is left homeless after being forced to sell Castle Sheldrake to pay his debts. It was then that a young girl named Beryl rescued him from the gutter (at the behest of her mother), giving him a room and even letting him use her garage as a new lair. Accepting his new role, the Knight trains Beryl as the Squire. Cyril has since excelled at his task as Britain's primary defender of the innocent and joined several international hero groups (International Ultramarine Corp, Batman Inc., etc.)

==== Gadgets ====
The Knight's current motorcycle is named Anastasia, after Dan Dare's spaceship, and has a stylized horse's head. Anastasia has a chemical tracking system built into her "nose". It is also of considerably tougher construction than a standard motorbike, surviving a head on jousting match with a Richard the Third clone suffering no significant damage. He also employs a squadron of miniaturized Spitfires under his control. Not only can they be used offensively against a variety of enemies, they can also see in various wavelengths and have been used to follow the trail of a serial killer. His armor as well as providing protection from attack also contains a variety of visual scanners and communication devices in the visor. The armor is even capable of moving independently of him; an experiment to make the armor continue fighting even when Cyril was unconscious resulted in it becoming self-aware and attacking. Squire generally handles the communications and computer side of things whilst his American man servant Hank Hackenbacker services and builds the bulk of his vehicles and machines as well as offering annoyingly sage advice when needed.

==== Allies ====
- Captain Cornwall and his son Cornwall Boy (sharing unspecified magical gifts)
- Rush Hour 1, 2 and 3 (Anglo-Indian speedsters of the Sikh religion)
- Milk Man (powers unknown but does possess a dangerous bottle of "Gold Top")
- The Fro (man with giant hair do)
- The Distinguished Gentlemen (finely dressed crime fighter)
- Birthday Girl (stark naked super heroine with strategically placed balloons)
- The Mechanic (wears a brown overcoat and a welder's mask, powers unknown)

==== Batman: Battle for the Cowl ====
In Battle for the Cowl, The Knight, along with Squire, is a member of the Network, a group of heroes whom the Bat-Family trusted to assist them if the need arose. Knight is seen assisting Dick Grayson (the current Batman, who as of the time was still Nightwing, de facto leader of the Network) in quelling the chaos in Gotham which erupted with the rumors of Batman's death.

==== Batman and Robin ====
Knight also appears in Batman and Robin #7-9, where Batman (Dick Grayson) asks for his help in locating the last Lazarus Pit in order to bring Bruce Wayne back to life. Knight placed Batman's corpse in the Lazarus Pit before Grayson and Squire's arrival, and he, along with Batwoman, Squire, and Batman, is the first one to see the corpse of Batman (Bruce Wayne) returned to life. However, they soon discover that the corpse was in fact a clone of Batman, and not Batman himself. This copy has a defect, making him mad and impossible to control.

==== Knight and Squire ====
Writer Paul Cornell wrote a six-issue Knight and Squire limited series with artist Jimmy Broxton and cover artist Yanick Paquette. The first issue was published in October 2010.

As shown in the limited series, the Knight is still based in Sheldrake Castle, Great Worden, Wordenshire, which has been equipped in a similar manner to the Batcave. The Knight's current motorcycle is named Anastasia, after Dan Dare's spaceship, and has a stylized horse's head. Anastasia has a chemical tracking system built into her "nose". It is also of considerably tougher construction than a standard motorbike, surviving a head on jousting match with a Richard the Third clone suffering no significant damage.

The Knight is portrayed as something of an elder statesman to other British superheroes, including Captain Cornwall (the heir to Merlin's power) and Rush Hour (an Asian British family of speedsters). He is also on good terms with some "villains" who duplicate the gimmickry of Batman villains without actually committing any crimes, such as Jarvis Poker, the British Joker. The Knight and Squire have a longstanding enmity with agents of an alternate universe in which Britain is a fascist state.

==== Batman Incorporated and death ====
After joining the Batman Incorporated global initiative, Knight is killed in combat with Heretic. He has a state funeral back in London, his coffin draped in the Union Flag. The Prime Minister talks about the possibility of resurrecting him.

=== Beryl Hutchinson ===
Following the death of Cyril Sheldrake, Beryl Hutchinson becomes the first woman to assume the role of the Knight. She subsequently joins Batman Inc. as the British "Batman".

== In other media ==
The Percival Sheldrake incarnation of Knight makes a non-speaking appearance in the Batman: The Brave and the Bold episode "Powerless!" as a member of the Batmen of All Nations.
