= Squire (character) =

Four fictional characters in DC Comics

- The Beryl Hutchinson incarnation of Squire as depicted in Knight and Squire #1 (December 2010). Art by Billy Tucci.

Publication information
- Publisher: DC Comics
- First appearance: (Cyril); Batman #62 (December 1950) (Percy); Young All-Stars #21 (January 1988) (Amina); Batman: The Detective #1 (April 2021)
- Created by: (Cyril); Bill Finger (writer); Dick Sprang (artist) (Percy); Roy Thomas (writer); Michael Bair (artist) (Beryl); Grant Morrison (writer); Howard Porter (artist) (Amina); Tom Taylor (writer); Andy Kubert (artist)

In-story information
- Alter ego: Percy Sheldrake; Cyril Sheldrake; Beryl Hutchinson; Amina Eluko
- Species: Human
- Place of origin: England
- Team affiliations: (Percy); Young All-Stars (Cyril); Ultramarine Corps; Global Guardians; Club of Heroes (Beryl); Ultramarine Corps
- Abilities: (Percy, Cyril); Swordsmanship, martial artist, outfitted in special armor that repels swords or light projectiles. (Beryl); Swordsmanship, skilled martial artist, expert in all forms of communication.

Squire is the name of four superheroes appearing in media published by DC Comics. Percival Sheldrake debuted as the Squire in Young All-Stars #21 (January 1988), and was created by Roy Thomas and Michael Bair. Cyril Sheldrake debuted as the Squire in Batman #62 (December 1950), and was created by Bill Finger and Dick Sprang. Beryl Hutchinson debuted as the Squire in JLA #26 (February 1999), and was created by Grant Morrison and Howard Porter. The fourth Squire, Amina Eluko, debuted in the limited series Batman: The Detective and was created by Tom Taylor and Andy Kubert.

== Publication history ==
Originally created in the 1950s as a counterpart to Robin for the Knight, a subsequent retcon made the Knight himself Squire to the original hero, the Shining Knight .

== Fictional character biography ==
=== Cyril Sheldrake ===
First appearing in the pages of Batman #62, Cyril was Percy Sheldrake's son, who was trained in manner much like his father had been, thus becoming the new Squire. They were constantly compared to Batman and Robin, and they considered themselves to be their European counterparts. Coincidentally, the dynamic duo made their way to England on one occasion, where they met up with Knight and Squire and formed an alliance to take down neo-Nazi supporters at their hidden base at Stonehenge. Percy was eventually killed by his arch-enemy Spring-Heeled Jack, leading Cyril to become the second Knight. Cyril subsequently joined the Ultramarine Corps, alongside his own Squire, Beryl Hutchinson.

He reappears in Batman #667-669. He, Beryl, Batman, Robin and the rest of the Batmen of All Nations, sometimes known as the "Club of Heroes", have become trapped on an island. It was seemingly to be an innocent reunion sponsored by their billionaire benefactor, Mayhew. All the possible transports off the island have been destroyed and everyone currently believes their lives to be in danger, as the Legionary and Wingman have been killed.

=== Percy Sheldrake ===
At age 20, young Percy came into leadership of his family (thus becoming Earl of Wordenshire) when his father was captured in France and his mother was killed in a terrorist attack over London. About this time, another knight from the Middle Ages known as the Shining Knight had recently thawed out from centuries of suspended animation and was assisting the war effort in his native land. Unable to save either of Percy's parents, the knight vowed to bring the villains to justice and end their regime once and for all. He took Percy under his wing and trained him just as a knight would train a squire in his original 6th century Camelot. He bestowed upon him the name Squire, and with the help of the Seven Soldiers of Victory, they fought against the evil and crime.

During his adventures, the Squire was also part of a team of adolescent superheroes called the Young Allies. Remaining together after the war, they fought against the rising threat of post-war nationals in Europe until inner conflicts caused the group to split up. Now on his own, and feeling his requisite training had been complete, Squire bestowed upon himself the name Knight, and joined yet another team (the Global Guardians) under this new name. He continued to fight for justice even after he fathered a son years later named Cyril.

=== Beryl Hutchinson ===
Beryl Hutchinson first appeared in JLA #26 (February 1999) and became the new Squire while assisting Knight. According to Grant Morrison, she was named after Beryl the Peril, a popular British comic-strip. Brave and courageous, she and Knight joined the Ultramarine Corps of Superbia after assisting them in saving a crime-ridden micro-Earth. As well as being an expert in swordplay, she is also naturally gifted in several forms of communication, including foreign languages, gestures, and interpretation. She can even read information patterns by touch. She cares a good deal for Cyril and will protect him at any cost.

While the Sheldrakes are nobility, Beryl apparently grew up on the streets. With regard to her education, she explained to Batman "the Hutchinsons never had no money, but they always had brains and a love of the library". In contrast, in Knight and Squire #1, she says she "went to a lot of different schools. State ones and posh ones, back and forth". She attributes her communication powers to this, since she needed to shift dialects rapidly to match the school she was attending.

She reappears in Batman #667-669, and again in several issues of the Batman R.I.P. storyline that runs through Batman #676-681 and "Battle for the Cowl" helping Tim Drake and Damian Wayne over the course of the series.

She appeared in issues of Batman and Robin helping Dick Grayson in his attempts to resurrect Batman with the Lazarus Pit by placing his body in it but it is revealed that it is not Bruce Wayne's body but a clone made during Final Crisis. Knight and Squire also battle a British crime lord and help Dick Grayson fight the clone.

Knight and Squire later appeared in an eponymous limited series written by Paul Cornell. In #4 of this series, it is revealed that Beryl sought out the Knight when he was in a drunken and depressed state after his father's death, having been asked to help him by her mother. The full connection between the Sheldrake and Hutchinson families have yet to be revealed. Over the course of the series, Beryl begins a relationship with the reformed villain Shrike (Dennis Ennis - following Beryl being named after Beryl the Peril by referencing Dennis the Menace).

She also briefly shares an adventure with Batgirl while she is in London as part of a mission for Batman Incorporated. The two heroines fix a crack in the space/time continuum that nearly freezes the entire planet in time for eternity.

In Batman Incorporated, Squire and Knight participate in Batman's war against the Leviathan organization led by Ra's al Ghul's daughter Talia al Ghul. During a battle with Heretic (Damian Wayne's clone), Cyril is killed. After coming to terms with her master's death, Beryl takes up his sword as Knight. She attempts to avenge Cyril but is stopped by Batman, only for Talia to kill Heretic herself. Beryl is seen in the last issue fighting alongside other Batman Inc. members against the remains of Leviathan.

=== Amina Eluko ===
Amina Eluko is a Black British woman who is the most recent incarnation of the Squire under Hutchinson. During the events of Doomsday Clock #5, the sequel series to Watchmen, she was appointed to the role as a part of Knights Inc, a UK defense force. Despite being mentioned, she physically debuted in the six-issue limited series Batman: The Detective in April of 2021.

== Powers and abilities ==
Originally, the first Squire had no powers aside from the ones he gained by wearing special armor provided for him by Shining Knight. As they were made by Merlin, they possessed special properties that allowed him to avoid harm from swords or certain projectiles. He since passed this armor to his son. The newest Squire, though lacking magic armor, has the ability to interpret information by touch, as well as communicate in a number of ways. Every one of them is highly skilled in swordplay, though they have talents using other weapons or fighting hand-to-hand as well.

== Other versions ==
In the Elseworlds 2003-2004 graphic novel Superman & Batman: Generations III, Batman and his son Bruce Wayne Jr. meet an adult Cyril Sheldrake in 2008. Now retired in a totalitarian England, Sheldrake helps the Waynes track down information left behind by Bruce's dead wife. Afterwards, the Waynes stay in London to help Sheldrake fight for freedom, and he is eventually elected Prime Minister of Great Britain.
