= Batwoman =

- An image of the Kate Kane incarnation of Batwoman from Gotham City Monsters #3. Art by Philip Tan and Jay David Ramos.

Publication information
- Publisher: DC Comics
- First appearance: Kathy Kane: Detective Comics #233 (1956); Kate Kane: 52 #11 (September 2006)

In-story information
- Alter ego: Katrina Luka Netz; Katherine Rebecca Kane
- Place of origin: Gotham City
- Team affiliations: The Outsiders; Justice League Queer; Batman Family
- Partnerships: Bette Kane
- Supporting character of: Batman
- Abilities: Both versions of Batwoman possess no metahuman powers but are skilled combatants with access to high-tech equipment.

Altered in-story information for adaptations to other media
- Alter ego: The CW / Arrowverse: Ryan Wilder; DC Animated Universe; Dr. Roxanne Ballentine; Sonia Alcana; Kathleen Duquesne

Batwoman is a name of several superheroes appearing in American comic books published by DC Comics, depicted as female counterparts and allies of Batman similarly to Batgirl. The original version of the character, Kathy Kane (eventually given the birth name Katrina "Luka" Netz to differentiate the character from the newer version), was created by writer Edmond Hamilton and artist Sheldon Moldoff under the direction of editor Jack Schiff as a love interest in an attempt to combat allegations of Batman's homosexuality arising from the controversial book, Seduction of the Innocent.

Eventually, the character would be replaced in 2006 by Kate Kane, the most iconic version of the character. This version of the character is depicted as a lesbian, and is Jewish, possessing a military background, and is a wealthy heiress who becomes inspired towards vigilantism by Batman, later revealed to be his maternal cousin (Kathy being the niece of Martha Wayne). Since the character's re-introduction in 2006, the character is notably DC Comics' most highly profiled gay superhero whose sexual orientation has been subjected to attention from the general public, both positive and negative. The character's chief love interests include Maggie Sawyer and Renee Montoya. The character has also been featured in several solo ongoing series, Detective Comics, and Outsiders (2023).

Within media, the Batwoman character has been adapted several times with some being original incarnations, such as Ryan Wilder from The CW Batwoman television series, portrayed by Javicia Leslie. This version is the daughter of Jada Jet (based on Jezebel Jet). In the DC Animated Universe, Batwoman is depicted as three different characters sharing the codename: GCPD detective Sonia Alcana (voiced by Elisa Gabrielli), Wayne Tech employee Dr. Roxanne "Rocky" Ballantine (voiced by Kelly Ripa), and socialite Kathleen "Kathy" Duquesne (voiced by Kimberly Brooks).

== Publication history ==
=== The original Batwoman ===
The original Batwoman character, Kathy Kane, was created in 1956 during the Silver Age of Comics. After the comic book industry was attacked in the early 1950s following the publication and controversy originating from Fredric Wertham's Seduction of the Innocent in which accused the Batman and Robin characters to be homosexual, the character was created to help offset the accusations and would first appear in Detective Comics #233 (July 1956). Characterized as a female rival to Batman who instead used gadgets often disguised as stereotypical feminine accoutrements and is assisted by her sidekick, Bat-Girl, she made regular appearances in Detective Comics and Batman.

While a popular character in her own right with readers, editor Julius Schwartz considered the Batwoman character inappropriate for his new direction for the fictional Batman universe and following the revamp to Detective Comics in 1964, Batwoman was removed from the series and three years later, was replaced by the Barbara Gordon version of Batgirl, whose approach and being a more direct female counterpart to Batman (using gadgets similar to Batman, being a highly skilled martial artist, and having a doctorate in her civilian identity) made her a more popular character. Although the character was several times requested by fans to revive the Batwoman character, DC's editorial of the time rejected the notion, believing the character only existed as Batman's love interest and her role was fulfilled with the Barbara Gordon character. The character eventually made several guest appearance starting in 1977 but was killed off in Detective Comics #485 (August–September 1979). Editor Dennis O'Neil later stated in an interview, "we already had Batgirl, we didn't need Batwoman." While the issue marked the final appearance of Earth-1 Kathy Kane, an Earth-2 version appeared The Brave and The Bold #182 (January 1982) although it would be the final appearance of the Kathy Kane character for decades.

=== The return of Batwoman ===
A new version of the character was eventually revealed in the spring of 2006. Sometime prior, DC editors called for a redesign of Batwoman, with comic book artist Alex Ross drawing inspiration from the modified Batgirl costume he designed for Barbara Gordon, seven years before Kate Kane's planned debut in the limited comic book series 52. While Ross and comic book author Paul Dini initially planned to revive the former Batgirl Barbara Gordon using an updated version of the character's original costume, the decision was rebuffed due to Gordon serving as one of a very small number of disabled superheroes of DC Comics as Oracle. This version differed from the Silver Age version of the character, being depicted as lesbian and was announced in the same time she was revealed.

Stories appeared on television news outlets such as CNN, general news magazines such as USA Today, and gay culture magazines such as Out regarding the new version of the character. In her debut issue, Kane is revealed to have been romantically involved with Renee Montoya, a former Gotham City Police detective (who would later be slated as the second incarnation of the superhero, the Question). When Wizard Entertainment inquired about editorial's decision to making Batwoman a gay character in an interview, DC Comics Senior Vice President and Executive Editor Dan DiDio responded "It was from conversations we've had for expanding the DC Universe, for looking at levels of diversity. We wanted to have a cast that is much more reflective of today's society and even today's fanbase. One of the reasons we made her gay is that, again when you have the Batman Family—a series of characters that aren't super-powered and inhabit the same circle and the same city—you really want to have a point of difference. It was really important to me to make sure every character felt unique." Batwoman's sexual orientation initially gathered mixed reviews, ranging from praise to outrage. A reviewer at Out asserts "Batwoman will be the highest profile gay superhero to ever grace the pages of DC Comics." Although several LGBT organizations such as GLAAD have praised DC Comics for attempting to diversify their characters, some have observed that Batwoman is not the first gay or lesbian character to appear in comic books, nor is she the only lesbian to be associated with the Batman series.

In 2008 during New York Comic Con, it was announced that Batwoman would be among the characters appearing in a new Justice League comic book written by James Robinson. That same year, Batwoman briefly took over as the lead character in Detective Comics, starting with #854. with DC saying at the 2009 New York Comic Con that she would be DC Comics' highest-profile gay superhero. Two years later, DC announced the character would star in an ongoing solo series art by J. H. Williams III, who would also co-write the series with writer W. Haden Blackman. Artist Amy Reeder Hadley would also contribute art, alternating story arcs with Williams. The series' introductory "zero issue" was released on November 24, 2010. The launch of Batwoman #1 was originally scheduled for February 2011, then delayed until spring; in early March it was announced that Batwoman #1 would be released sometime in Fall 2011, as part of the New 52 rebooted DC Universe. That same year, Grant Morrison would also restore the original Kathy Kane into modern continuity in flashbacks, most prominently in Batman Incorporated #4 (August 2011).

A later issue in 2013 issue reveals the origin of the original Batwoman in current DC Universe continuity, depicting her as Bruce's aunt by marriage who is widowed and later becomes both a crime fighter and lover alongside Bruce for a time until she was seemingly killed. The issue also revealed her being a spy sent to deduce Batman's secret identity and true parentage to Nazi scientist and spymaster, Otto Netz (also known as Agent Zero). That same year, co-authors J.H. Williams and W. Haden Blackman announced that they would leave Batwoman after the December issue because of conflicts with DC over creative differences, remarking that they were not allowed to expand Killer Croc's back story, keep their original ending to their current story arc, or depict Kate and Maggie getting married. This announcement followed a February 2013 announcement that Batwoman #17 would feature the proposal between Kate and Maggie. DC Comics responded that Batwoman could not get married because "heroes shouldn't have happy personal lives".

The Kathy Kane character would make some appearances throughout the Grayson series (2014 - 2016) as an antagonist, revealing a new birthname of Katrina Luka Netz and being with both the codename "Agent Zero" and acting as the secret head of the espionage organization, Spyral. In the same year the series began, it was announced that the Batwoman series would be canceled in March 2015 at issue forty, along with twelve other New 52 series. The Kate Kane version would later appear as a leading character in the DC Comics Rebirth revamp of Detective Comics, which returned to its original numbering with issue #934.

In July 2023, DC announced that Batwoman, along with Batwing, would lead a new Outsiders series after the conclusion of the "Gotham War" crossover event.

In October 2025, DC announced a new Batwoman series, written by Greg Rucka with art by Dani and colors by Matt Hollingsworth, as part of their upcoming Next Level publishing initiative.

== Fictional character biographies ==
=== Kathy Kane ===
The first incarnation of Batwoman has been presented with several different origins over the course of her publication history. Her earliest known origin depicts her as Katherine "Kathy" Kane, a circus stuntwoman who received a large inheritance upon her father's death and become a socialite in Gotham City. Frequently associated with Bruce Wayne, she would often team up with his alter-ego, Batman, and was a prominent ally and was assisted by her sidekick, Bat-Girl (aka Bette Kane, her niece). As Batwoman, she used her wealth and resources to fight crime much like Batman.

Her origin was later revised by Grant Morrison, instead casting birth name as Katherine Webb, aspiring independent film director and later wife of Nathan Kane (the brother of Martha Kane) and thus, Batman's aunt via affinity. Tying to her old origins, Nathan would purchase a circus for her as a gift but after his untimely death, she was recruited by a young man known as Agent 33 (the future El Gaucho of the Batmen of All Nations) into the organization Spyral, and trained as a spy. She was given the assignment of learning of Batman's identity and donned the Batwoman codename and costume to get closer to him. Falling in love with him, the pair became lovers despite her of being legally his aunt. As such, she refused to disclose his identity. Spyral's leader and Nazi villain, Doctor Dedalus (known as Otto Netz) revealed himself as her biological father and threatened to expose her to Batman unless she continued her mission. She broke off her relationship with Bruce to save him from Dedalus' plan.

In the 2014 Grayson series, her origin is once more revised by Tim Seeley and Tom King. Although most elements of her previous origin from Morrison remained the same, her birthname is instead Katrina "Luka" Netz, with the latter two names as aliases. Unlike her last portrayal, she is raised by Otto Netz as a potential successor but has an antagonistic relationship with her sister, Elisabeth Netz (Frau Netz), throughout their childhood, a machinations fostered by Otto's abuse of the children. As adults, the pair compete for control of Spyral and Leviathan, organizations created by Otto Netz as opposing forces. While Elisabeth took after Otto's intelligence, Kathy instead adopted her father's spymaster prowess.

Although each origin of the character differs in reasoning and approach, all versions of the character became Batwoman and were once involved with Batman romantically at some point and later seemingly killed by Bronze Tiger. Bronze Tiger's connection to her death was revealed to be false and later attributed to villainess Scorpiana by El Gaucho, previous Agent 33 whom recruited her during his time as an agent of Spyral. Ultimately, it was revealed to be a ruse by Kathy, who later kills Talia al Ghul and revealed as the headmistress of St. Hadrian, an all-girls boarding school that is a training ground for future female spies for Spyral and served as a high-ranking member. She later adopts the codename "Agent Zero" and acts as the secret leader of Spyral behind even the associated directors.

=== Kate Kane ===
Katherine Rebecca Kane is depicted as a Jewish military brat, one of the twin daughters of Jacob Kane (brother of Martha Kane) who grew up with a close relationship with her parents and twin, Beth. She is also the maternal cousin of Batman. On their twelfth birthday, the twins alongside their mother were abducted and although her father assembled a team to rescue them, Kate's mother and seemingly Beth was killed. Now raised by Jacob, a single father, he inspired her to join the United States Army but she was later kicked out of the United States Military Academy despite exceeding standards as a cadet due to her being gay. The experience caused her to spiral into depression and she began excessively partying and frequently having one-night stands. She would also become briefly romantically involved with the young traffic cop, Renee Montoya, but later break up after Kate denounces her for being closeted. When later she tries reconciling with Renee, she is nearly mugged and saved by Batman. Kate then becomes inspired to become a vigilante and would later be extensively trained by her father, eventually becoming Batwoman.

== Other versions ==
=== Alternate universes ===
- An alternate universe version of Batwoman appears in Kingdom Come (1996). This version is an admirer of Batman from the Fourth World.
- An alternate universe version of Batwoman appears in Batman: Dark Knight Dynasty (1997). This version is Brenna Wayne, a fourteenth-generation descent of Bruce Wayne.
- An alternate universe version of Batwoman appears in JLA: The Nail (1998) and its sequel JLA: Another Nail (2004). This version is Selina Kyle, who abandoned her previous identity as Catwoman to assist Batman after the deaths of Robin and Batgirl.
- An alternate universe version of Batwoman appears in Superman/Batman #24 (2005). This version is Helena Wayne, a gender-flipped version of Batman.
- In DC Comics Bombshells, which take place in an alternate history version of World War II, there are three versions of the character outside of Kate Kane:
  - Katherine Webb is the aunt of Kate and Bette and the headmistress of Pinkney Orphanage. She is later defeated by a team of Batgirls, including Bette, who come to the orphanage to save the orphans from her cruel care.
  - Kathleen "Kathy" Duquesne is an auto mechanic and leader of a team of Batgirls, who protect the city during Batwoman's absence.
  - Sonia Alcana appears as an officer of Gotham City Police Department, partnered with Crispus Allen and working with Maggie Sawyer to aid Batwoman into her fight against crime in the city.
- In the 2019 Young Justice series, Stephanie Brown is the Batwoman of Earth-3.

=== Alternate timelines ===
- In the Teen Titans storyline "Titans Tomorrow" (2005), Bette Kane is Batwoman, and wears a costume similar to Kathy's pre-Crisis one.
- In the follow-up storyline, "Titans of Tomorrow... Today!" (2007), Bette Kane remains Flamebird and former Batgirl Cassandra Cain becomes Batwoman.

== In other media ==
=== Television ===
- A loose adaptation of Batwoman appears in the Batman: The Brave and the Bold episode "The Criss Cross Conspiracy!", voiced by Vanessa Marshall. This version is visually based on the Kathy Kane incarnation, but is depicted as series original character Katrina Moldoff / The Bat Lady, thrill-seeking heiress to the Moldoff Circus fortune and a trained circus acrobat whose crime-fighting style endangers bystanders. After being publicly unmasked and humiliated by the Riddler years prior, she is forced to give up her crime-fighting lifestyle before seeking revenge in the present by encouraging Felix Faust to give her a spell to switch her and Batman's bodies, allowing her to get closer to the Riddler without the police coming after her. After she fails, Batman rescues her and convinces Faust to switch them back before she quietly turns herself in to the police. Series director Ben Jones confirmed that the decision to rename the character was brought about after DC Comics voiced concerns about this depiction of the character having a negative impact on the new Batwoman comic book series, the first issue of which launched less than a month after the episode's initial air date.
- The Kate Kane incarnation of Batwoman appears in a self-titled TV series, portrayed by Ruby Rose in the first season and Wallis Day in the second. Additionally, Kane's successor and series original character Ryan Wilder also appears in the series, portrayed by Javicia Leslie.
- The Kate Kane incarnation of Batwoman makes non-speaking appearances in Young Justice as a member of the Justice League and Batman Inc.

=== Film ===
- An original incarnation of Batwoman appears in Batman: Mystery of the Batwoman, voiced by Kyra Sedgwick. This version is an identity used by three people: GCPD Detective Sonia Alcana (voiced by Elisa Gabrielli), Wayne Tech employee Dr. Roxanne "Rocky" Ballantine (voiced by Kelly Ripa), and Kathleen "Kathy" Duquesne (voiced by Kimberly Brooks), who all hold grudges against the Penguin and Rupert Thorne as well as Carlton Duquesne, a gangster in the crime bosses' employ and Kathy's father. Alcana, Ballantine, and Kathy pooled their resources and skills together to seek revenge while taking turns operating as Batwoman to draw suspicion away from each other, with all three using lethal force to achieve their goals. In the DVD and Blu-ray special features, the producers explained that DC did not want the filmmakers to use Kate Kane in a family-friendly film due to the violence associated with her character.
- The Kate Kane incarnation of Batwoman makes a cameo appearance in the DC Animated Movie Universe (DCAMU) film Batman vs. Robin.
- The Kate Kane incarnation of Batwoman appears in the DCAMU film Batman: Bad Blood, voiced by Yvonne Strahovski. This version works with Batman, who disapproves of her use of live guns and ammunition in combat, and has known Dick Grayson since childhood.
- The Kate Kane incarnation of Batwoman appears in Lego DC Batman: Family Matters, voiced by Tara Strong.
- The Kate Kane incarnation of Batwoman makes a non-speaking cameo appearance in the DCAMU film Justice League Dark: Apokolips War, where she is killed by Paradooms.
- The Kate Kane incarnation of Batwoman appears in Catwoman: Hunted, voiced by Stephanie Beatriz.

=== Video games ===
- The Kate Kane incarnation of Batwoman appears in DC Universe Online, voiced by Christina Moore.
- The Kate Kane incarnation of Batwoman appears as a playable DLC character in Lego Batman 3: Beyond Gotham.
- The Kate Kane incarnation of Batwoman appears as an unlockable playable character in Lego DC Super-Villains.
- The Arrowverse incarnation of Kate Kane / Batwoman appears as a playable character in the mobile version of Injustice 2.

=== Miscellaneous ===
The Kate Kane incarnation of Batwoman appears in the Injustice: Gods Among Us prequel comic. This version is a member of Batman's Insurgency and wife of Renee Montoya.

== See also ==
- Batgirl
- Robin
- Huntress
