= WildStorm =

American publishing company

WildStorm Productions
- Type: Subsidiary
- Industry: Comic books
- Founded: 1992; 34 years ago (original); February 16, 2017; 9 years ago (revival)
- Founder: Jim Lee
- Defunct: December 2010; 15 years ago (original)
- Fate: Shut down (original)
- Headquarters: La Jolla, California, U.S.
- Key people: Jim Lee; Hank Kanalz; Ben Abernathy
- Parent: Image Comics (1992–1998); DC Comics (1998–present)

WildStorm Productions (stylized as WildStorm) is an American comic book imprint. Originally founded as an independent company established by Jim Lee to publish through Image Comics, Wildstorm became a publishing imprint of DC Comics in 1998. Until it was shut down in 2010, the Wildstorm imprint remained editorially separate from DC Comics, with its main studio located in California. The imprint took its name from a portmanteau of the titles of the Jim Lee comic series WildC.A.T.S. and Stormwatch.

Its main fictional universe, the Wildstorm Universe, featured costumed heroes. Wildstorm maintained a number of its core titles from its early period, and continued to publish material expanding its core universe. Its main titles included WildC.A.T.S, Stormwatch, Gen^{13}, Wetworks, and The Authority.

Wildstorm also published creator-owned material, and licensed properties from other companies, covering a wide variety of genres. Its creator-owned titles included Red by Warren Ellis and Cully Hamner, Ex Machina by Brian K. Vaughn and Tony Harris, The Winter Men by Brett Lewis and John Paul Leon, and the first six issues of The Boys by Garth Ennis and Darick Robertson. Its licensed titles included Gears of War, Resident Evil, The X-Files, Friday the 13th, A Nightmare on Elm Street, The Texas Chainsaw Massacre. Wildstorm was also home to Alan Moore's America's Best Comics imprint.

DC shut down the Wildstorm imprint in December 2010. In September 2011, the company relaunched its entire superhero line with a rebooted continuity in an initiative known as The New 52, which included Wildstorm characters incorporated into that continuity with its long-standing DC characters.

In February 2017 Wildstorm was revived as a standalone universe with The Wild Storm, by writer Warren Ellis. However, the characters were reintroduced to DC continuity in 2021.

== History ==
=== Image Comics (1992–1997) ===
Wildstorm, founded by Jim Lee, was one of the founding studios that formed Image Comics in 1992. Wildstorm, originally known as Aegis Entertainment, grew out of Homage Studios, a workspace shared by Lee, Whilce Portacio, Scott Williams, and others in San Diego, California.

Image was founded by Lee, Portacio, Erik Larsen, Rob Liefeld, Todd McFarlane, Marc Silvestri, and Jim Valentino. All but Portacio became full partners in the new firm. Silvestri joined Homage Studios shortly after the founding of Image Comics. Although he worked at the studio, his projects appeared under his own Top Cow imprint. Silvestri continued to work out of Homage Studios until 1994.

Lee's first project for Image and Aegis Entertainment was WildC.A.T.s. The line was expanded with Deathblow, Stormwatch, and Union in 1993. An Homage Studios talent search publicized in WildC.A.T.s issue 2 led to the hiring of Brett Booth, J. Scott Campbell, Alex Garner, and others in 1993.

Also in 1993, Image and Valiant Comics began publishing the inter-company crossover Deathmate. The project was the result of a series of conversations Image Comics co-founder Jim Lee and then Valiant Comics publisher Steve Massarsky and Vice President of Marketing Jon Hartz had in 1992 over the possibility of a crossover. Homage Studios produced Deathmate Black, which was solicited for late summer but didn't ship until October. "Many consider Deathmate the comic book that singlehandedly put an end to the industry's prosperous times and the biggest reason why so many comic book stores closed its doors for good," comics historian Jason Sacks wrote. "In truth, there was plenty of blame to go around."

In late 1993, Lee changed his venture's name to Wildstorm Productions. He explained: "As Aegis grew and the marketplace changed, I decided a new name would more accurately define the nature of the titles we produce". Former DC editor Bill Kaplan was brought in to oversee production and scheduling, in an effort to combat the studio's problems with erratic publication schedules.

Image published the Wildstorm title Gen^{13} issue 1 in 1994. Although pre-orders were disappointing at 173,000 copies, it became Image's biggest hit of the year at a time when the company's sales were dropping. Though many Image titles sold more than 500,000 copies per issue in 1992 and 1993, by mid-1994 only the top-selling titles reached 250,000 in sales. Image executive director Larry Marder later said that the Deathmate crossover had damaged Image's reputation but that Gen^{13} led retailers to re-evaluate the company.

A Saturday morning cartoon series of WildC.A.T.s lasted only a single season (1994–1995), while a full-length animated version of Gen^{13} was produced but never released in the United States.

Watchmen co-creator Alan Moore took over writing WildC.A.T.S with issue 21 in 1995, and remained the regular writer on the title for 14 issues. His run on the series introduced a new WildC.A.T.S team consisting of both new and established characters who remained on earth while the other team adventured in space.

Marvel hired Lee and Liefeld in 1995 to revamp four classic Marvel titles in an effort to boost sales. Marvel paid Lee and Liefled $1 million plus 40% royalties to produce the comic books through their respective studios. Wildstorm produced Iron Man and Fantastic Four while Liefeld's Extreme Studios produced Avengers and Captain America. Each of these titles relaunched in 1996 with a new issue 1 set in the "Heroes Reborn" universe, a separate continuity from the main Marvel comics line. Lee penciled Fantastic Four and co-wrote it with Choi. Iron Man was penciled by Portacio and written by Lee and Scott Lobdell. Sales on Fantastic Four tripled. Wildstorm took over Liefeld's titles with issue 7. Each Heroes Reborn title lasted 12 issues, after which the characters were reintroduced to the main Marvel continuity and the series resumed their previous numbering in 1998.

In 1996, Wildstorm launched a new imprint called Homage Comics. Described as a "home for creator-owned material as well as a safe haven from an increasingly challenging comic book market," the initial line-up consisted of Astro City by Kurt Busiek, Terry Moore's previously self-published Strangers in Paradise, and a new title called Leave it to Chance by James Robinson and Paul Smith.

Also in 1996, Wildstorm launched a Gen13 spin-off called DV8, written by Warren Ellis with art by Humberto Ramos. The first issue, which took a darker and more mature tone than Gen13, was one of the top selling comics of the year. Ellis also took over writing Stormwatch in 1996 and likewise took the series in a more mature direction.

Following Heroes Reborn, Jim Lee returned to Image Comics, writing and drawing a new series called Divine Right: The Adventures of Max Faraday in 1997. Sales, however, were disappointing in part due to an erratic schedule: Lee only managed to publish seven issues over 15 months.

In 1998, WildStorm launched the Cliffhanger imprint to showcase created owned titles from a new generation of popular artists, starting with Crimson by Humberto Ramos, Danger Girl by J. Scott Campbell, and Battle Chasers by Joe Madureira.

Wildstorm also ventured into licensed comics, publishing Resident Evil: The Official Comic Magazine, based on the video game franchise, in 1998.

=== DC Comics first run (1998–2010) ===
Due to declining sales across the U.S. comics industry, and his view that his role as publisher and growing family demands interfered with his role as an artist, Lee left Image Comics and sold WildStorm to DC Comics in late 1998, enabling him to focus once again on art. The deal went into effect in January 1999. Wildstorm remained based in La Jolla, California, and was initially reported to retain editorial independence, while benefiting from DC's marketing efforts during a comic book market slump. DC, meanwhile, benefited from increased market share and access to Wildstorm's coloring department. However, DC editorial intervened in a number of Wildstorm titles over the years and comics journalist Rich Johnston blamed this interference for the imprint's downfall of the imprint.

By the time of the acquisition, Wildstorm had established a creative services business providing art and graphic design to external clients. Because DC had no interest in the creative services business, Ted Adams, who had previously run the business at Wildstorm, and three other former Wildstorm employees founded Idea and Design Works (IDW) to serve the company's existing clients.

WildStorm launched a new imprint titled America's Best Comics (ABC) in January 1999 to publish a line of titles created by Alan Moore, including Promethea, The League of Extraordinary Gentlemen, Tomorrow Stories, Tom Strong and Top 10. Moore conceived of the line as what the comic book industry might have looked like if the superhero genre had not dominated the medium but instead developed around popular pre-superhero genres like pulp heroes, science fiction, and mythology. Moore agreed to create the line before DC's acquisition of Wildstorm. Because Moore had vowed never to work for DC again, Lee and another Wildstorm representative flew to Moore's home in Northampton, England to work out a deal that would keep the ABC line entirely separate from DC's editorial.

Later in 1999, WildStorm launched The Authority, written by Warren Ellis with art by Bryan Hitch. The series was a successor to Ellis's work on Stormwatch following the deaths of several characters from that title in pages of Ellis's 1998 WildC.A.T.S/Aliens mini-series. The Authority was a dark and violent superhero comic that Grant Morrison described as a fusion of British cynicism with the utopian superhero ideals of Superman creators Jerry Siegel and Joe Shuster. Ellis wrote its first twelve issues before handing the series over to Mark Millar. The success of The Authority set the tone for the future of Wildstorm and helped establish the "widescreen comics" trend. Also in 1999, Wildstorm published Planetary created by Ellis and artist John Cassaday. The ambitious series featured a team of "archeologists of the impossible" uncovering the "secret history of the 20th century" and was filled with pop culture references.

Wildstorm moved the majority of its superhero titles to a new imprint called "Eye of the Storm" in 2002. The titles were labeled for "mature readers" as the content shifted away from traditional superhero stories towards more morally complex themes. The imprint published critically acclaimed titles such as Joe Casey and Dustin Nguyen's Wildcats 3.0, Stormwatch: Team Achilles by Micah Ian Wright and Whilce Portacio, and Sleeper by Ed Brubaker and Sean Phillips. Wright was fired by DC for lying about his military service. The Eye of the Storm imprint was shuttered by the end of 2004.

Meanwhile, Wildstorm continued publishing creator owned works. The company published Global Frequency by Warren Ellis in 2002, which was adapted by Warner Bros. into a television pilot that never aired but was eventually leaked to the internet. Red by Ellis and artist Cully Hamner was published in 2003 and was adapted into a film released in 2010. The Eisner Award winning Ex Machina by Brian K. Vaughn and Tony Harris debuted in 2004. Wildstorm was also published the first six issues of The Boys by Garth Ennis and Darick Robertson in 2006, which was adapted into a television series beginning in 2019, before the comic book series moved to Dynamite Entertainment in 2007. Ennis explained that this was because DC Comics were uneasy with the anti-superhero tone of the work. Other notable creator owned series published by Wildstorm include Automatic Kafka by Joe Casey and Ashley Wood, The Winter Men by Brett Lewis and John Paul Leon, and Sam Kieth's Zero Girl and Four Women.

WildStorm also continued publishing licensed comics, including Thundercats and Robotech in 2002. The imprint became a notable publisher of video game related comic books, publishing promotional comics and tie-ins for games including Everquest, Gears of War, Ratchet and Clank, Resident Evil, Prototype, and World of Warcraft. Other licensed titles included X-Files, Fringe, A Nightmare on Elm Street, Friday the 13th, and The Texas Chainsaw Massacre.

After a series of disputes with DC, Moore announced in 2005 that he would do no new work for DC or Wildstorm after he finished his existing commitments. League of Extraordinary Gentlemen: Black Dossier was published in 2007, after which the series moved to Top Shelf. Moore also co-wrote Albion, published in 2006 by Wildstorm, with his daughter Leah Moore and her husband John Reppion. Wildstorm continued publishing ABC titles written by other writers, such as Tom Strong and the Robots of Doom, written by Peter Hogan, in 2010.

In 2006, the DC miniseries Captain Atom: Armageddon reset the Wildstorm Universe and established it as one of the parallel worlds in the DC multiverse. This was followed by the "Worldstorm" event that relaunched several Wildstorm titles, including the flagship titles Wildcats by Grant Morrison and Jim Lee and The Authority by Morrison and Gene Ha. However, the two flagship titles ended with three issues published between them due to scheduling conflicts. Other titles relaunched as part of the event included Deathblow written by Brian Azzarello with art by Carlos Tan, Gen13, written by Gail Simone with art by Talent Caldwell, Stormwatch: Post Human Division (PHD) written by Christos Gage with art by Doug Manhke, and Wetworks, written by Mike Carey with art by Portacio.

In 2008, facing declining sales, the Wildstorm line saw yet another change in status quo. A series of cross-overs and mini series (Wildstorm: Armageddon, Wildstorm: Revelations, and Number of The Beast) depicted a catastrophic event and the line's titles shifted shifted into a post-apocalyptic direction. This attempt to revitalize the line, however, did not result in a substantial increase in sales. In September 2010, DC announced that Wildstorm would be "restructured" to join the company's digital publishing team; that month, the brand was credited with digitally converting some titles for DC's iPhone and iPad applications. The imprint was shut down in December 2010, with Wildcats (vol. 5) #30 as its last issue, although DC executives announced that the characters would reappear some time in the future. The imprint's licensed comics continued publishing under the DC banner.

=== Wildstorm characters in the DC Universe (2011–2016) ===
DC Comics relaunched its DC Universe imprint in September 2011, which included the integration of the WildStorm characters into the DC Universe. The initial wave of relaunched titles included: Voodoo and Grifter solo series, a revived Stormwatch title featuring Jack Hawksmoor, Midnighter, Apollo, the Engineer, and Jenny Quantum, and a revived version of Team 7 with non-WildStorm characters Deathstroke, Amanda Waller and Black Canary. The Teen Titans spin-off title The Ravagers featured Caitlin Fairchild and Warblade as part of the cast, while WildC.A.T.s villain Helspont appeared in Superman #7 and #8, Grunge appeared in Superboy #8, Zealot appeared in Deathstroke #9, and Spartan appeared in Team 7 #5. Midnighter was a recurring character in Grayson, before spinning off into his own ongoing series.

Wildstorm characters continued to appear in the DC Universe following the DC Rebirth relaunch in 2016, including in the GLAAD Media Award nominated Midnighter and Apollo series published from 2016 to 2017. In 2018 Tom Strong appeared in The Terrifics and Promethea appeared in Justice League of America.

=== DC Comics second run (2017–present) ===
On February 16, 2017, Wildstorm was officially revived with The Wild Storm #1 by Warren Ellis and Jon Davis-Hunt, a 24 issue series that re-imagined the Wildstorm Universe. On October 11, 2017, Wildstorm launched a second series under The Wild Storm banner with the 12 issue mini-series The Wild Storm: Michael Cray by Bryan Hill. Following the conclusion of The Wild Storm DC Comics announced that a new Wildcats six issue mini-series was to debut August 28, 2019, again penned by Ellis with art by Ramon Villalobos, but was cancelled in 2019.

Grifter, Apollo, and The Midnighter appeared in the alternate future timeline series Future State: Dark Detective in 2021. The Wildstorm characters were then officially reintroduced into DC Universe continuity later that year in Batman: Urban Legends #5 and Superman and The Authority. The new Authority team then appeared as supporting characters in the Superman crossover story arc Warworld Saga.

A 12-issue WildC.A.T.S series by Matthew Rosenberg and Stephen Segovia ran from 2022 to 2023. The 2023 series Birds of Prey featured WildC.A.T.S member Zealot, and the Outsiders series relaunched the Wildstorm title Planetary with a new version of the character The Drummer as well as the Authority's sentient home The Carrier. Deathblow appeared in Deathstroke: The Terminator in 2026.

Wildstorm characters have also appeared in DC Black Label series including Superman vs. Lobo, Waller vs. Wildstorm, and Jenny Sparks. The 2026 Elseworlds title Superman: Father of Tomorrow featured alternate versions of several Wildstorm characters and factions, such as Stormwatch, Henry Bendix, and a WildC.A.T.S. team that included Grifter, Void, and Zealot.

In 2023, James Gunn of DC Studios announced that a film based on The Authority was in development and would help form the basis of the new DCU. In November 2023, María Gabriela De Faría was cast to play The Engineer, a member of The Authority, in the Superman film ahead of The Authority film. Despite Superman's success, Gunn wrote on Threads in April 2026 that The Authority had been placed on indefinite hiatus, saying it "didn't work in terms of the larger DCU".

== Legacy ==
The Wildstorm series The Authority helped start the "widescreen comics" trend that laid the ground work for modern superhero cinema. Reflecting on Wildstorm's legacy in 2010, Image Comics co-founder Rob Liefeld called the series one of the most influential comic books of his lifetime. It was also the first comic book published by DC or Marvel to feature a gay wedding.

Four Wildstorm books made Paste Magazine's "The 20 Best Graphic Novels of the Decade (2000-2009)" list: Wildcats Version 3.0: Brand Building, Ex Machina Vol. 1, The Absolute Authority Vol. 1, and Absolute Planetary. The ABC title Promethea was included on The A.V. Club's "Top 25 comics of the ’00s" list.

Joseph Hedges published Wild Times: An Oral History of WildStorm Studios in 2017.

== Titles ==
=== Major WildStorm Universe ===
- WildC.A.T.s
- Stormwatch
- The Authority
- Wetworks
- Gen^{13}
- Dv8
- Team 7

=== Creator-owned titles ===
- Ex Machina by Brian K. Vaughan
- Astro City by Kurt Busiek
- The Wizard's Tale by Kurt Busiek
- Arrowsmith by Kurt Busiek and Carlos Pacheco
- America's Best Comics by Alan Moore
- Danger Girl by Andy Hartnell and J. Scott Campbell
- Battle Chasers by Joe Madureira
- Crimson by Humberto Ramos
- Out There by Humberto Ramos
- Steampunk by Chris Bachalo and Joe Kelly
- Red Menace by Danny Bilson, Paul DeMeo, Adam Brody and Jerry Ordway
- A God Somewhere by John Arcudi and Peter Snejbjerg
- Leave It to Chance by James Robinson and Paul Smith
- Strangers in Paradise by Terry Moore
- The Maxx by Sam Kieth
- The Boys by Garth Ennis and Darick Robertson
- Zero Girl by Sam Kieth
- Four Women by Sam Kieth
- Mek by Warren Ellis
- Red by Warren Ellis
- Reload by Warren Ellis
- Two-Step by Warren Ellis
- Tokyo Storm Warning by Warren Ellis
- Desperadoes by Jeff Mariotte

=== Licensed titles ===
- Friday the 13th
- A Nightmare on Elm Street
- The Texas Chainsaw Massacre
- World of Warcraft
- StarCraft
- Resident Evil
- Dante's Inferno
- The X-Files
- God of War #1-5; #6 was published by DC Comics due to WildStorm's closure at that time.
- Modern Warfare 2: Ghost
- Gears of War #1-14; #15-24 were published by DC
- Mirror's Edge: A six-part limited series, a tie-in with the 2008 game of the same name
- Star Trek: A series of limited series and one-shots, published by DC 1999–2002
- Fringe: Two six-part limited series about the Fox television series 2009

== See also ==
- List of WildStorm titles
- List of WildStorm reprint collections

== Adaptations ==
=== Television ===
- Wild C.A.T.s (1994–1995), based on WildC.A.T.s by Jim Lee and Brandon Choi.
- The Boys (2019–2026), based on The Boys by Garth Ennis and Darick Robertson.
- The Boys Presents: Diabolical (2022), based on The Boys by Garth Ennis and Darick Robertson.
- Gen V (2023–2025), based on The Boys by Garth Ennis and Darick Robertson.
- Vought Rising (2027), based on The Boys by Garth Ennis and Darick Robertson.

=== Film ===
- Gen¹³ (1998), based on the Gen¹³ by Jim Lee, Brandon Choi and J. Scott Campbell.
- The League of Extraordinary Gentlemen (2003), based on The League of Extraordinary Gentlemen (Vol. 1) by Alan Moore and Kevin O'Neill.
- Red (2010), based on Red by Warren Ellis and Cully Hamner.
- Red 2 (2013), based on Red by Warren Ellis and Cully Hamner.

=== Video games ===
- Danger Girl (2000), based on Danger Girl by J. Scott Campbell and Andy Hartnell.
- Battle Chasers: Nightwar (2017), based on Battle Chasers by Joe Madureira and Munier Sharrieff.
