= Mister Gone =

Fictional comic character in "The Maxx"

Mr. Gone
- Art made by Hilary Barta and Sam Keith

Publication information
- Publisher: Image Comics; IDW Publishing
- First appearance: The Maxx #1 (March 1993)
- Created by: Sam Kieth

In-story information
- Alter ego: Artemus Pender
- Notable aliases: Artemus Pender Artie Artemus Pender Gone Gone Low Uncle Artie Pablo MacArthur
- Abilities: Outback Control & Access Isz Command Shape-Shifting Telepathy & Mental Link Dimensional Wormholes Immortality / Spirit Form

Mr. Gone is a fictional character, the primary antagonist in The Maxx, a comic book created in 1993 by Sam Kieth and co-written by William Messner-Loebs. Effectively immortal, the supervillain Mr. Gone is an evil wizard who sexually assaults women. The character justifies his actions by revealing that he was abused as a child himself.

== Character overview ==
Mister Gone is introduced as a serial rapist of young women who has supernatural powers: He is telepathic, can assume other forms, and is effectively immortal. He can also enter and control "the Outback," an alternate dimension that resembles prehistoric Australia. The Isz, the Outback's main predators, serve as his henchmen.

He discovers the Outback on a government-funded trip to Australia to study ancient aboriginal religions. There, he learns many forms of magic and uses the Outback to manipulate people.

Later issues of the comic book reveal him to be a more complex character. His backstory establishes that he was sexually abused as a child, and victimized women as an adult to lash out at a world he felt had wronged him. He reconnects with his daughter Sarah during his crime spree, which brings up long-dormant feelings and the stirrings of a conscience. Years later, he undergoes a spiritual rebirth, and comes to feel remorse for his crimes. He spends the remainder of the series trying to find redemption.

== Character history ==
=== Role in the comics ===
During his rape spree, Mister Gone makes several anonymous phone calls to Julie Winters, a freelance social worker, claiming to have committed his crimes for her. Julie hangs up on him every time, dismissing him as an obscene phone caller.

In issue #2, Mister Gone kidnaps Julie, ties her up, and begins to tell her about her past and her Outback. Before he can reveal anything, however, Julie overpowers and beheads him. While his corporeal form dies, however, his malignant spirit lives on in the Outback. From there, he communicates with Julie and two of her clients - The Maxx, a homeless man who believes himself to be a superhero, and Sarah James, a depressed teenager who goes to Julie for counseling. He torments them with vague, riddling clues about their pasts, leaving them with more questions than answers. Every time he resumes a physical shape, however, Julie destroys it.

The Isz eventually retrieve Mister Gone's severed head and bring it into the real world. Masquerading as a piece of magical clay, he manipulates Sarah into bringing his head into Julie's apartment, where he plans to return to life. He and the Isz hold a mortician hostage and force him to sew the head back onto the body, fastening it with a neck brace. He then manipulates a neighborhood boy into delivering to Sarah a mysterious series of audio tapes that reveal his true identity as her father, who she believed had committed suicide years earlier.

Issue #10 reveals that, as a child, Julie knew Mister Gone as "Uncle Artie", a friend of her father's. Only he knew that both Julie and her mother could see the Outback. Years later, Julie was attacked and raped by a hitch-hiker, a trauma that sent her into a deep depression. Weeks later, she accidentally struck a homeless man with her car. Mister Gone, who was watching from the Outback, unintentionally charged a random piece of trash with the energies of the Outback before Julie used the trash to cover up the body. As a result, the victim, a man named Dave, was granted the power to see and enter the dimension - thus becoming the Maxx.

After finding Sarah, Mister Gone tries to help her find her spirit animal, a horse. When she learns of his true identity, however, she is horrified, and severs all ties between them.

Mister Gone goes underground with help from the Isz, occasionally communicating with Sarah and Julie telepathically. In issue #15, he transports his essence into a now-pregnant Julie's bathroom and reveals her true connection to the Maxx. Soon afterward, the Maxx discovers his true identity, sheds his heroic alter ego, and drifts away.

==== Character evolution ====
In issue #21, set in 2005, Sarah, now an adult, tracks Mister Gone down and contacts him so she can profit from a welfare program for adult children of living fathers. Now calling himself "Artie", he is married to a woman named Gaynor and works as a farmer. Sarah demands information from him about the events of 10 years before. He explains that he is trying to atone for his crimes, and asks Sarah for forgiveness. Sarah refuses to believe that he has changed, however, and says she wants nothing to do with him.

That night, Sarah dreams that the welfare program is a scam concocted by a group of CIA agents who intend to use her to apprehend Mr. Gone. In Sarah's dream, the CIA agents find and kill Mister Gone, and she does nothing to stop it. It is eventually revealed that, while the assassination attempt really happened, Mister Gone foiled it and planted the dream in Sarah's mind to see whether he could manipulate her.

In issue #26, Sarah listens to the tapes Mister Gone had given her years earlier, and learns about his life prior to the events depicted in the series. Born Artemus Pender, he was sexually abused as a child by his aunt and a male baby-sitter, and grew up to fear and hate women. His first wife was a drug addict who killed their son before dying of an overdose, and his second wife was an alcoholic whom he abused until she left him. His third wife, Tilly, tried to give him love and understanding, and bore him a daughter — Sarah. Eventually, however, his violent impulses returned, and he began having dreams of hurting his new family. When Tilly left him and took Sarah, he committed suicide. He was immediately returned to life, unharmed, thanks to his connection to the Outback. Soon afterward, he began raping young women as "Mr. Gone".

After encountering his daughter, however, he began to feel remorse for his crimes. He sought redemption by making amends with his victims and becoming a counselor for victims of sexual abuse. He met his fourth wife, Gaynor, who accepted his past and reassured him that he was worthy of love. After learning about her father's life, Sarah forgives and reconciles with him.

In issue #29, Mister Gone reunites Julie with her son and persuades Dave to become the Maxx once again in order to save Julie from Iago, a giant, murderous banana slug. He claims to have discovered a dimensional wormhole that will erase the events of 10 years before and give them all a chance at a fresh start. Sarah ventures into the wormhole, switching places with a giant Isz. Just as Mister Gone is about to enter the wormhole, however, the CIA agents — one of whom had been the boy he had manipulated years earlier — storm in and shoot him dead.

Moments later, he is once again returned to life, and his physical and spiritual forms are sent to separate dimensions. His physical form is projected back into the real world as a college professor who befriends the alternate version of the Maxx, a janitor. His spiritual self, meanwhile, is projected into the Outback, where he lives happily ever after with Sarah.

== In other media ==
- In the MTV animated series based upon the first 11 issues of the comic book, Mr. Gone was voiced by Barry Stigler.
