= Shawn Martinbrough =

American comic book artist

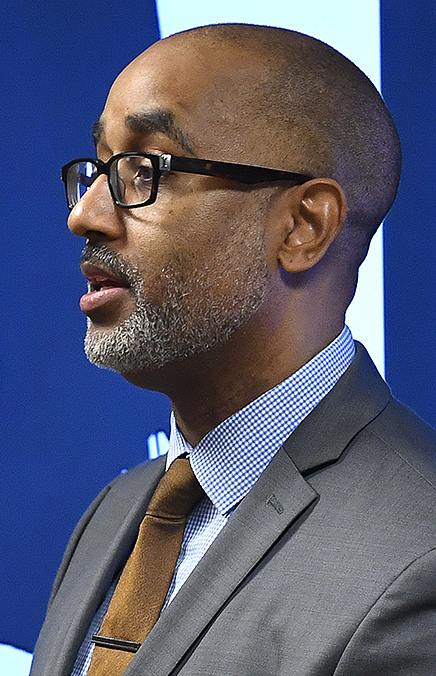
- Martinbrough in 2018
- Born: c. 1972 (age 53–54) New York City
- Areas: Penciller, Artist, Inker
- Notable works: Thief of Thieves; Angeltown; Detective Comics
- Collaborators: John Paul Leon; Robert Kirkman
- Spouse: Ayanna Ross (m. 2017)

Shawn C. Martinbrough is an American comic book artist. The long-time artist for Robert Kirkman's Thief of Thieves, Martinbrough is known for his film noir-influenced drawing style.

== Biography ==
Growing up in the Bronx, Martinbrough's early influences included Alex Toth, Frank Miller, and David Mazzucchelli.

Martinbrough graduated from Fiorello H. LaGuardia High School in 1989. He then attended the School of Visual Arts. Martinbrough got his first professional work — a painted illustration for Marvel Comics — while still a student at SVA.

Early in his career, Martinbrough worked for minority-led publishing imprint Milestone Media, primarily as an inker. In 1993, he inked over John Paul Leon on early issues of the Milestone property Static. He followed that by inking virtually the entire run of DC/Milestone's Shadow Cabinet, again over Leon's pencils. Martinbrough and Leon teamed up again for DC's 1996 reboot of Challengers of the Unknown, with Martinbrough inking issues 1-9 (and inking covers through issue #17).

Martinbrough was given his first ongoing penciling duties starting with the DC Comics series The Creeper, in 1997–1998.

In 2000–2001, Martinbrough and writer Greg Rucka were the creative team of Detective Comics (starting with issue #742 [March 2000]). During their run, they created the Sasha Bordeaux character in issue #751 (Dec. 2000), as well as the villains Kyle Abbot and Able Crown. Rucka and Martinbrough's run was collected in Batman: New Gotham, Volumes 1 and 2.

Following his stint on Detective Comics, in 2002 Martinbrough signed on with Marvel Comics to illustrate writer Geoff Johns' four-issues limited series Morlocks.

In 2005, Martinbrough and writer Gary Phillips produced Angeltown, a five-issue limited series published by Vertigo Comics. The story is told in the blaxploitation idiom, with nods to the detective stories of Chester Himes and Walter Mosley. In 2011, the series was reprinted by Moonstone Books as Angeltown: The Nate Hollis Investigations.

In 2007, Watson-Guptill Publications and The Nielsen Company published Martinbrough's How to Draw Noir Comics: The Art and Technique of Visual Storytelling.

In 2009, Martinbrough teamed with writers Mike Benson and Adam Glass on the four-issue limited series Luke Cage Noir.

Since 2012, Martinbrough has been the artist of the monthly series Thief of Thieves, co-written by Robert Kirkman and published by Image Comics/Skybound Entertainment. Kirkman chose Martinbrough because of his "cinematic flair" and ability to "portray characters realistically."

In 2018, New York's Society of Illustrators held the exhibition "Shawn Martinbrough: Storyteller".

In 2024, Martinbrough provided the art for Neil Gaiman and Marc Bernardin's multi-volume comic adaptation of Gaiman's novel, Anansi Boys. Published by Dark Horse Comics, the first volume of Anansi Boys will run for eight issues.

== Personal life ==
Martinbrough and his wife Ayanna Ross were married in April 2017. They live in Alexandria, Virginia.

== Awards ==
- 2010 Glyph Comics Awards Fan Award for Best Comic for Luke Cage Noir
- 2026 Inkpot Award

== Bibliography ==
=== Comics ===
As artist unless otherwise noted.

- (inker) Static #4, 8, 10–12 (DC/Milestone, 1993)
- (inker) Shadow Cabinet #1–11, 14–17 (DC/Milestone, 1994–1995)
- Man Against Time #3 (Image Comics, 1996)
- (inker) Challengers of the Unknown #1–9 (DC, 1997)
- The Creeper #1–11, #1000000 (DC, 1997–1998)
- Detective Comics #742–764 (DC, 2000–2001)
- Morlocks #1–4 (Marvel Comics, 2002)
- Vertigo Pop! Bangkok #1-4 (Vertigo/DC Comics, 2003)
- (with Jock) Losers #1–12 (Vertigo X, 2004)
- Angeltown #1–5 (Vertigo, January – May 2005)
- World War Hulk: Front Line #2–5 (Marvel, 2007)
- Luke Cage Noir #1-4 (Marvel Noir, 2009)
- Black Panther: The Most Dangerous Man Alive #525, 526, 529 (Marvel, 2012)
- Thief of Thieves #1-present (Image Comics/Skybound, 2012–present)
- Hellboy and the B.P.R.D. #16 (Dark Horse Comics, 2017)
- Anansi Boys (Dark Horse Comics, 2024)

=== Books ===
- How to Draw Noir Comics: The Art and Technique of Visual Storytelling (Watson-Guptill Publications / The Nielsen Company, 2007) ISBN 978-0823024063

Preceded by N/A	Shadow Cabinet inker 1994-1995	Succeeded by N/A
Preceded by N/A	Challengers of the Unknown inker 1997	Succeeded by Bill Reinhold
Preceded by N/A	The Creeper penciler 1997–1998	Succeeded by N/A
Preceded by Patrick Zircher	Detective Comics artist 2001-2002	Succeeded by Rick Burchett
Preceded by N/A	Thief of Thieves artist 2001-present	Succeeded by ongoing
