= Angeltown =

Angeltown or Angel Town may also refer to:

== Places ==
- Angel Town, nickname for Los Angeles

== Film ==
- Angel Town (film), 1990 American martial arts film

== Comics ==
- Angeltown (comics), 2005 comic book series
- Angeltown, a location in Trifecta (Judge Dredd story)

== Music ==
- Angeltown, 1996 album by Richard Clapton
- Angeltown, compilation album released by Orchid Tapes
- "Angel Town", song from The Great Lakes (album)
- "Angeltown", official city song of Los Angeles
