= Fall Out Toy Works =

Comic book series by Pete Wentz

- Cover art of issue #1

Publication information
- Publisher: Image Comics
- Format: Limited series
- Genre: Cyberpunk
- Publication date: September 2009 – 2013
- No. of issues: 5

Creative team
- Created by: Pete Wentz; Darren Romanelli; Nathan Cabrera
- Written by: Brett Lewis
- Artist: Sam Basri
- Letterer: Annie Parkhouse
- Colorist(s): Imaginary Friends Studios; Sunny Gho
- Editor(s): Dave Elliott; Jeff Krelitz

Fall Out Toy Works is an American comic book limited series, created by Pete Wentz of Fall Out Boy, Darren Romanelli, and Nathan Cabrera. It is written by Brett Lewis, whose previous work includes The Winter Men, and is illustrated by several members of Imaginary Friends Studios. The first issue was published by Image Comics on September 2, 2009.

The story is about androids with artificial intelligence in a futuristic Los Angeles. It has been compared to Pinocchio and Pygmalion.

== Plot ==
The plot is "inspired by the ideas & lyrics of Fall Out Boy", especially the song "Tiffany Blews" from the album Folie à Deux. The story focuses on the Toymaker, who despite being a brilliant inventor, finds himself in financial trouble. A rich magnate known as the Baron seeks to have a robotic woman companion, but his team of scientists is unable to create one that behaves realistically. The Baron hires the Toymaker to help advance the process, and he creates a new android named Tiffany.

== Development ==
Wentz met with designer, Darren Romanelli, to discuss a creative collaboration for Fall Out Boy's musical tour. They decided to base their concept on the song, "Tiffany Blews". Romanelli then consulted with comics industry member, Nathan Cabrera, together creating a world inspired by the song's lyrics. Wentz, while admittedly "not a really big comic guy," approved of the comic series after being shown some storyboards they had drawn. They were introduced to writer Brett Lewis and Imaginary Friends Studios through Romanelli's friend, editor Jeff Krelitz. Wentz, while not directly involved in the writing process, contributed ideas and oversaw the general direction of the comic. They intend to expand the concept into a whole media franchise, including animation and merchandise.

In interviews, Wentz talked about the themes discussed in the comic: "There's a strong element of, 'What is real? What makes something real? Can you fabricate reality?'" "It explores the dimensions of what love really is. Can it be designed in you? Can a robot fall in love?" He cited Blade Runner as a thematic and visual influence.

An animated adaptation, dubbed a "motion comic", is in production by Double Barrel Motion Labs. A teaser trailer was released online on the day of the first issue's publication.

== Reception ==
Over 75 people turned up for a comic book signing at a Phoenix, Arizona retailer, Atomic Comics.
