= Brett Lewis =

American comic book creator and editor

- Born: Queens, New York, U.S.
- Areas: Writer, editor
- Notable works: The Winter Men

Brett Lewis is an American comic book writer and editor, best known for his post-superheroic series The Winter Men with artist John Paul Leon, as well as the Eisner-nominated short story "Mars to Stay" with art by Cliff Chiang.

== Early life ==
Lewis studied art under Walter Simonson at New York's School of Visual Arts, where he first met The Winter Men co-creator John Paul Leon.

== Career ==
Lewis began his career in comics as an editor, first at Marvel Music, a short-lived imprint of Marvel Comics that focused on branded releases of comics featuring, among others, Alice Cooper and The Rolling Stones, then at Motown Machineworks, a company that released comics through Image with the partial aim of producing movie vehicles for black stars. In the late 1990s, Lewis wrote a part of the Image series Bulletproof Monk, which was later adapted into a film of the same name, as well as some stories for Allstar Arena, a publisher of sports comic books aimed for release in stadiums. One of these stories, The Mailman, a sci-fi comic starring Utah Jazz power forward Karl Malone, marked the first published collaboration between Lewis and John Paul Leon.

According to Leon, before publication, The Winter Men has been developing for over a decade. In a 2006 interview, he stated,

Brett Lewis and I first began developing this project about five years ago. It began years before then when Brett had the idea of doing a Russian-based Superman story. This was probably 1993 or so.

The series had a turbulent publishing history, first announced as an 8-issue limited series for DC Comics' Vertigo imprint, then moved under Wildstorm while being cut to six and, eventually, five issues. The series concluded with a 40-page special two years after issue #5.

== Personal life ==
Lewis was assaulted in 2009 and suffered traumatic brain injury, which still causes him severe health problems, including a series of cranial and brain surgeries. His family and friends have set up a GoFundMe to help with the treatment. The last post was from August 2024 but after that there are no news or posts on any social media about the current state of the author.

== Bibliography ==
=== Image Comics ===
- Motown Machineworks:
  - Casual Heroes (as editor; written and drawn by Kevin McCarthy, one-shot, 1996)
  - The Crush #1–3 (as editor; written by Mike Baron, drawn by Walter A. McDaniel, 1996)
  - Man Against Time #1–4 (with Gino DiCicco, Shawn Martinbrough (#3) and ChrisCross (#4); issues #3–4 are co-written by Lewis and David Quinn, 1996)
- Bulletproof Monk #1–2 (of 3) (with Michael Avon Oeming; issue #2 is co-written by Lewis and R. A. Jones, 1998) collected in Bulletproof Monk (tpb, 80 pages, 2002, ISBN 1-58240-244-2)
- Fall Out Toy Works #1–5 (with Sami Basri and Hendry Prasetya (#4–5), 2009–2010) collected as Fall Out Toy Works: Tiffany Blues (tpb, 160 pages, 2011, ISBN 1-60706-359-X)
- Thief of Thieves #38–43 (with Shawn Martinbrough, Skybound, 2018–2019) collected as Thief of Thieves: Closure (tpb, 128 pages, 2019, ISBN 1-5343-1036-3)

=== DC Comics ===
- The Big Book of Martyrs: "St. Alban: The Good Pagan" (as artist, written by John Wagner, anthology graphic novel, 192 pages, Paradox Press, 1997, ISBN 1-56389-360-6)
- Scooby-Doo vol. 3 (Cartoon Network):
  - "Return of the Star Dog" (with Joe Staton, in #33, 2000)
  - "Good Ghost Haunting" (with Anthony Williams, in #42, 2001)
  - "Bats What I'm Afraid of" (with Joe Staton, in #47, 2001)
  - "The Case of the Greedy Tar" (with Vincent DePorter, in #49, 2001)
  - "Fight or Flight!" (with John Delaney, in #53, 2001)
  - "The Case of the Cold Trail" (with Karen Matchette, in #72, 2003)
- Dexter's Laboratory #18: "Control Freaks" (with Eduardo Savid, Cartoon Network, 2001)
- Weird Western Tales vol. 2 #3: "Once Upon a Time in the Future" (with Eduardo Risso, anthology, Vertigo, 2001)
- The Powerpuff Girls (with Christopher Cook, Cartoon Network):
  - "The Trouble with Bubbles" (in #18, 2001) collected in The Powerpuff Girls Classics: Picture Perfect (tpb, 140 pages, IDW Publishing, 2014, ISBN 978-1-63140-017-9)
  - "Bless This Mess" (in #27, 2002) collected in The Powerpuff Girls Classics: Bless This Mess (tpb, 140 pages, IDW Publishing, 2015, ISBN 1-63140-160-2)
- The Winter Men #1–5 + Winter Special (with John Paul Leon, Wildstorm, 2005–2009) collected as The Winter Men (tpb, 176 pages, 2009, ISBN 1-4012-2526-8)
- The Witching Hour: "Mars to Stay" (with Cliff Chiang, anthology one-shot, Vertigo, 2013)

=== Other publishers ===
- Allstar Arena:
  - Karl Malone: The Mailman (with John Paul Leon, one-shot, 1997)
  - Webber's World (with Gordon Purcell and Brad Gorby, one-shot, 1998)
- Disney Adventures #97-1: "Battle Man" (with Chris Jordon, Disney Publishing Worldwide, 1997)
- Shortstop Squad (co-written by Lewis and Paul Fairchild, art by Tommy Lee Edwards, Ultimate Sports Force, 1999)
- Marvel:
  - The Amazing Spider-Man on Bullying Prevention (with Mark D. Bright, one-shot, 2003) collected in The Avengers: No More Bullying (tpb, 96 pages, 2015, ISBN 0-7851-9851-2)
  - The Halo Graphic Novel: "Second Sunrise Over New Mombasa" (with Moebius, anthology, hc, 128 pages, 2006, ISBN 0-7851-2372-5; sc, 2010, ISBN 0-7851-2378-4)
