= Gary Phillips (writer) =

American writer, editor, and community activist

- Born: August 24, 1955 (age 70); Los Angeles, California, USA
- Education: California State University, Los Angeles (BA)
- Occupation: writer
- Website: gdphillips.com

Gary Phillips (born August 24, 1955) is an American writer, editor, and community activist whose 1994 novel Violent Spring is considered a classic work of crime fiction and one of the essential crime novels about Los Angeles. His more than two dozen books range from hard-boiled mysteries such as the Ivan Monk series to graphic novels including Angeltown and anthologies like The Obama Inheritance: Fifteen Stories of Conspiracy Noir. Phillips has also served as a story editor and writer on the television show Snowfall.

== Life ==
Phillips was born on August 24, 1955, in Los Angeles to Dikes Phillips, a mechanic, and Leonelle Hutton Phillips, a librarian. His family was among many African Americans who left the Southern United States for Los Angeles in the 1940s and '50s. Phillips's mother developed multiple sclerosis after he was born, resulting in his being raised primarily by his father. The stories Phillips's father told him about being on the road during the Great Depression later influenced his decision to become a writer.

Phillips attended San Francisco State University for a year and received a B. A. in graphic design from California State University, Los Angeles, in 1978. He has worked as a printer and as a "political campaign director, union organizer, and activist against police brutality and South African apartheid". In particular, Phillips worked for the Coalition Against Police Abuse because of the brutality of the 77th division of the Los Angeles Police Department that patrolled the area where he grew up. He also was one of the founding directors of the MultiCultural Collaborative, a community-based groups aiming to reduce racial tensions following the 1992 Los Angeles riots.

In 1989 after being fired from his job with a union, Phillips enrolled in a creative writing class taught by Robert Crais. During the class Phillips wrote a mystery story about an African American private investigator named Ivan Monk, a character he returned to in his first novel.

== Mystery writing ==
Phillips is known for writing comic books, detective noir, and pulp fiction, all works that also influenced him while growing up in South Los Angeles. In particular, his crime fiction has been praised as being a "terrific" example of the hard-boiled mystery genre and being "firmed rooted" in that tradition. Phillips himself describes his writing style as "hard-boiled tales with dashes of Chester Himes and Ashley Montague." Among Phillip's other self-admitted influences are Rod Serling, Jack Kirby, Jim Steranko, and Richard Pryor.

Phillips's first novel Violent Spring featured the character Ivan Monk, who he originally wrote about in Robert Crais's creative writing class. In the novel, Monk investigates the murder of a Korean shop owner in the aftermath of the 1992 riots. Violent Spring was released in 1994 by the small publishing company West Coast Crime and later optioned by HBO. The novel is now considered a "crime classic" and has been called one of the essential crime novels of Los Angeles by CrimeReads.

In addition to Violent Spring, Phillips has written three other novels in the acclaimed series featuring Ivan Monk along with the short story collection Monkology: 13 Stories From the World of Private Eye Ivan Monk, released in 2004 by Macmillan Publishers.

Another series of mysteries by Phillips focuses on an African American woman named Martha Chainey, who is a former showgirl. The series deals with "her exploits with the Vegas mob as a crime solver." Phillips has so far written two novels about Chainey.

In 2022 Phillips released the mystery novel One-Shot Harry, set in 1960's Los Angeles and featuring an African American crime scene photographer investigating the death of his friend. One-Shot Harry was a finalist for the 2023 Nero Award and nominated for the Sue Feder Memorial Award for Best Historical Mystery

Phillips has also served on the national board of the Mystery Writers of America.

== Editing ==
Phillips has edited a number of anthologies including Orange County Noir and The Obama Inheritance: Fifteen Stories of Conspiracy Noir, with the latter receiving the 2018 Anthony Award for Best Anthology. The Obama Inheritance was inspired by the many conspiracy theories generated about President Barack Obama. Each story in the anthology focused on one conspiracy theory as a means to "Riff on it, take it apart and turn it on its head, and give the reader a thrill ride of weirdo, noirish, pulpy goodness."

His 2008 anthology The Darker Mask: Heroes from the Shadows, edited with Christopher Chambers, presented a look at superheroes outside the traditional mythology of "admirable White males" and featured original stories by Walter Mosley, L.A. Banks, Peter Spiegelman, Ann Nocenti, Naomi Hirahara and others. In 2011, Phillips co-edited The Cocaine Chronicles with Jervey Tervalon, an anthology of original stories.

His 2022 anthology South Central Noir from Akashic Books focused the best-selling short fiction series on South Los Angeles and featured authors such as Tananarive Due, Gar Anthony Haywood, Naomi Hirahara, and Penny Mickelbury. In addition to editing South Central Noir, Phillips also contributed the story "Death of a Sideman" about two old friends surveying the changing section of Los Angeles.

== Comics and graphic novels ==
Philips also writes comic books, which he says was his first love as a writer. "I started out decades ago wanting to be a comic book artist and writer," Phillips said in an interview with Black Issues Book Review. "I wanted to work for Marvel so bad that I would have sold my sister if I had one."

Among the comics Philips has written is the 2005 miniseries Angeltown released by Vertigo/DC Comics. His comic Twilight Crusade: Envoy for Moonstone Books, about a hitman for God, was released in 2008. Phillips also wrote for Dark Horse Comics.

In 2008, Phillips released High Rollers through Boom! Studios. This four-issue comic followed the rise of a Los Angeles gangster named Cameron Quinn as he builds and runs his criminal enterprise. In 2019 he co-wrote The Be-Bop Barbarians with Dale Berry, which told the story of three Black cartoonists "struggling to create unconventional comics in a racist industry."

== Television work ==
Phillips has had a number of his works optioned by Hollywood, including his first novel Violent Spring and Culprits, an anthology of short stories focusing on different criminals in Texas pulling off a heist. After meeting John Singleton during a series of community panels and writers conferences, Phillips was hired to serve as a story editor and writer on the FX television show Snowfall. The show is set in Los Angeles between 1983 and 1990 and revolves around the first crack epidemic and its impact on the city, including the neighborhoods where Phillips grew up.

== Critical reception ==
The bulk of Phillips's work is set in Los Angeles and frequently draws upon his life experiences to give the stories "a sense of reality and authenticity." Phillips has been described as the "epitome of the noir cool" with Michael Connelly saying that "There is a raw energy in what Gary writes. His work is almost as physically imposing as he is because he's a no-holds-barred sort of writer."

According to the Guide to Literary Masters & Their Works, "Some critics have complained that Phillips mixes social commentary inelegantly with his mysteries, since the genre is basically escapist, but to Phillips the purpose of writing detective fiction is to make a social comment about America and its mix of nationalities and cultures."

Phillips's One-Shot Harry was called "fast-paced, tough, wry and smart" by Maureen Corrigan in The Washington Post, with the novel taking "readers deep into another world and time: its jokes, home furnishings, baloney-meatloaf-and-hot-dog-heavy meals; its hateful slurs, 'invisible' racial boundaries and cautiously hopeful possibilities."

== Selected bibliography ==
=== Ivan Monk series ===
- Violent Spring (West Coast Crime, 1994)
- Perdition, U.S.A. (1995)
- Bad Night Is Falling (1998)
- Only the Wicked (2000)
- Monkology: 13 Stories From the World of Private Eye Ivan Monk (Macmillan Publishers, 2004)

=== Martha Chainey series ===
- High Hand (2000)
- Shooter's Point (2001)

=== Other novels ===
- Bangers (Kensington, 2003)
- Freedom's Flight (Parker Publishing, 2009)
- The Jook (1999, rereleased by PM Press 2009)
- The Underbelly: Outspoken Authors #3 (PM Press, 2010)
- One-Shot Harry (Soho Crime, 2022)

=== Graphic novels and comics ===
- The Perpetrators (Uglytown Productions, 2002)
- Angeltown (Vertigo/DC Comics, 2005; rereleased in 2011 as Angeltown: The Nate Hollis Investigations by Moonstone Books)
- Twilight Crusade: Envoy (Moonstone Books, 2008)
- The Be-Bop Barbarians with Dale Berry (Pegasus Books, 2019)

=== Short story collections ===
- The Unvarnished Gary Phillips: A Mondo Pulp Collection (Three Rooms Press, 2023)

=== Anthologies (as editor) ===
- The Darker Mask: Heroes from the Shadows, with Christopher Chambers (Tor Books, 2008)
- Orange County Noir (Akashic Books, 2010)
- The Cocaine Chronicles, with Jervey Tervalon (Akashic Books, 2011)
- The Obama Inheritance: Fifteen Stories of Conspiracy Noir (Three Rooms Press, 2017)
- Culprits: The Heist Was Just the Beginning, with Richard Brewer (Polis Books, 2018)
- South Central Noir (Akashic Books, 2022)
