= Thief of Thieves =

Comic book series

- Cover of Thief of Thieves 1, art by Shawn Martinbrough and Felix Serrano

Publication information
- Publisher: Image Comics/Skybound
- Schedule: Monthly
- Format: Ongoing series
- Publication date: February 2012 – June 2019
- No. of issues: 43

Creative team
- Created by: Robert Kirkman
- Written by: Robert Kirkman; Nick Spencer; James Asmus; Andy Diggle; Brett Lewis
- Artist: Shawn Martinbrough
- Letterer: Rus Wooton
- Colorist: Felix Serrano

Thief of Thieves is a monthly comic book series published by Image Comics' Skybound imprint which premiered in 2012. Created by Robert Kirkman, the comic centers on Conrad Paulson, a highly successful thief who quits the business and begins a new life stealing from other thieves. The series features a rotation of writers, including Nick Spencer on the first story arc, and art by Shawn Martinbrough. The first three issues sold out upon release, and a television series based on the comic is in development at AMC.

== Publication history ==
At the 2010 San Diego Comic-Con, Thief of Thieves was announced as one of the titles that would help launch Robert Kirkman's Skybound, an imprint of Image Comics. A year later, Kirkman told USA Today that working on AMC's The Walking Dead television series influenced his approach on co-writing Thief of Thieves: "Having worked on the Walking Dead TV show, I've really fallen in love with the way that TV shows are written, where a bunch of people get together and they plot stuff and people split off into their own little splinter groups and write episodes," he said. "I think that's a really neat way to tell stories and something that could be utilized in comics more often." Kirkman put together a team of four other writers, beginning with Nick Spencer, to rotate different story arcs. The second arc, which begins with the eighth issue, will be written by James Asmus. Shawn Martinbrough is the book's permanent artist. Kirkman wanted Spencer to write the first arc because of his "knack for good and interesting dialogue," and liked Martinbrough's "cinematic flair" and ability to "portray characters realistically." The series debuted on February 8, 2012.

== Plot ==
Redmond is a master thief who decides to quit just before attempting what would be his biggest heist yet. He then begins a new career of stealing from other thieves in an effort to make up for all his previous mistakes, but finds himself on the run from people on both sides of the law. Kirkman explained, "He's got this compulsion where he has to steal or he doesn't feel like he's living, but he doesn't want to break the law anymore." Thief of Thieves depicts both sides of Redmond's life: one as the thief along with his young apprentice, Celia; and the other as his real name, Conrad Paulson, who has an estranged wife and adult son.

== Characters ==
=== The Paulson family ===
- Conrad Paulson (alias Redmond): hailed as the greatest thief in modern times. Conrad is a master thief, but has paid the cost to become one, at the expense of his family. At an evening celebration for what is known as "The Venice Job", Conrad makes an announcement that he is leaving "the game". The reason for this is so he can win back his ex-wife Audrey and their son Augustus.
- Audrey Paulson: the ex-wife of Conrad, the mother of Augustus, and the sister of James. She is a retired thief that used to go on heists with Conrad, and James. She quit "the game" after her brother was killed. She begged Conrad to retire, but to no avail. However, Conrad promised her that Augustus would never follow in their footsteps. Audrey participates in the Venice job to help her son. In the aftermath of the Venice Job, Redmond puts Audrey and Augustus on a yacht to keep them from getting killed by The Italians. Redmond had told Arno the location of his family. The yacht has been blown up. Arno visits Redmond in a hotel room the next day to break the news about two bodies recovered from the lagoon.
- Augustus Paulson: known as "the fuck up". Ever since he found out that Conrad was a thief, Augustus wanted to follow in his footsteps. Conrad is upset about this revelation, and keeping his promise to Audrey was very stern with his son stating that he's just like his Uncle James. This pushes Augustus to commit his first crime, and be caught by the police. In the police department, his parents come to bail him out, but Augustus tells his dad to fuck off. He explains to his parents that Conrad stated that he was like Uncle James. This exact moment causes the family to split up. Despite trying to live "civilian life" he still commits heists, but does not have any of his father's skills. He went to college for two semesters, but quit to make a name for himself in "the business". This leads him to his first big job in Cincinnati. During his two semesters, he meets his girlfriend Emma. After Cincinnati, Augustus agrees to a job with the Mexican Cartel based in San Diego to intercept heroin from the Italians. The job doesn't go as planned and he is arrested. With his back against the wall, and no one to turn to, he calls Conrad for help. He is later kidnapped and tortured by The Cartel due to the feds dismantling the Cartel's influence in San Diego. Lola instructs Conrad that he has one month to get him ten million dollars or he'll murder the entire Paulson family. He is stored in a semi and driven around to various locations until Conrad comes up with the money. Augustus was on the yacht with his mother Audrey when it exploded. Two bodies were recovered the next day.
- James: Conrad's deceased brother-in-law, Audrey's brother, and Augustus' uncle. James was on a thief's team with Conrad, and his sister Audrey. During a heist gone wrong, knowing that his sister and brother-in-law have a child, he sacrificed himself so Conrad could escape. He was gunned down by the F.B.I. task force, due to "suicide by cop". He is the catalyst for the Paulson family splitting up, and Augustus and Conrad not having a relationship.

=== The Thieves Guild ===
- Celia: Redmond's apprentice and the heir apparent, an honor that was never bestowed to Conrad's own son. Celia is a Latina with piercings and tattoos. She also has a son named Leroy who is being raised by her younger sister Penny, who does not approve of Celia's lifestyle. She first met Conrad when she tried to break into Conrad's car. He decided to teach her the ropes, in effect saving her from being robbed at gunpoint by the person she was going to steal for. She asks Conrad to show her what to do. Due to this man changing her and her son's life for the seemingly better, she has an attraction for her mentor. She always makes not-so-subtle sexual advances towards Conrad, but to no avail, since Conrad's main focus is to get Audrey back. In the aftermath of Arno being killed, Celia returns from hiding out in Iceland with the black book. Conrad explains to her that he has finalized their divorce. Conrad walks over to Celia and kisses her. The two end up having sex. Celia explains to Conrad that the longer they sit, the less the black book is worth due to the contacts switching bank accounts. Conrad states to her that he is done, and that "Redmond is dead". Celia leaves the hotel, and makes a phone call revealing her alias. She is now the new "Redmond".
- Arno Montclair: Seemingly a legitimate businessman as a pharmaceutical magnate, Arno is really in the business of selling stolen goods. This is known as being a "fence". He is responsible for financing "The Venice Job" only for Conrad to abandon the project at the last second. This leads to conflict with Conrad later on. It is revealed that he gave up Conrad's son to Cartel leader Lola in a ruse to get Conrad to do the Venice job. Arno tells Conrad about the death of his family, but this "death" was a ruse to draw out Arno's true intentions. Conrad gives Arno an opportunity to see if he has what it takes to kill. Arno pulls the trigger, only to find out the gun was emptied. Audrey and Augustus come from behind the curtain holding Arno at gunpoint. The Paulson family drives Arno out to one of his properties. Arno begs for his life to be spared. Conrad states that he will keep his promise and not kill him, but can't say the same for his family. Audrey and Augustus fire off multiple rounds, ending Arno's life. He is a balding rotund man in his fifties.
- Samuel Henry Alias Hartford: one of Arno's trusted thieves. He is known as "The Key" which means he can break into anything. He is African American and resembles Wu Tang Clan rapper Ghostface Killah.
- Montgomery Price Alias The Rabbit: one of Arno's trusted thieves. He is known as "The Slip" which means he is good with pickpocketing and slipping in and out of places undetected. He is also an expert in technology and forgery. He seems to be a hybrid of Linus Caldwell and Livingston Dell from the Ocean's trilogy.
- Patricia Watson Alias Mabel: one of Arno's trusted thieves. She is the "sexy distraction". She moonlights as an exotic dancer, that goes on heists on the side. She is also good with disguises, and has the ability to distract people from their jobs.
- Elliot Grandin: one of Arno's trusted thieves. He is known as "The Heavy" which means he can repair and drive anything.
- Stephen Winstead Alias Riddle: one of Arno's trusted thieves. He is known as "The Worm". He is a chubby Asian man.
- Chris Chase Alias Hustle: one of Arno's trusted thieves. He is known as "The Fireman". He is an African American in his early/mid twenties.
- Prior: one of Arno's trusted thieves. He is an African American man in his mid/late thirties. He's always dressed impeccably.
- Estrada: one of Arno's trusted thieves. He is a Latino man with an eye patch. He tries to hit on Conrad's ex-wife Audrey during the Venice job.
- Emma: Augustus' girlfriend. Emma met him in college and becomes a member of his crew. She gets caught in a heist gone wrong in Cincinnati and turns into a criminal informant. She nearly got Augustus locked up in the heroin heist. Due to the heroin being lost and Augustus failing to pay the cartel back, she is kidnapped and held for ransom in a penthouse in San Diego by Cristo's men. She manages to make a call to Agent Elizabeth Cohen to ask for help. The FBI storms the condominium building, and manages to save her before Augustus and Conrad do. Now that members of the cartel are locked up, the FBI will provide protection in exchange for getting information on the Paulson family.
- Enzo Sabatini He is an art dealer, and Conrad's connection based out in Venice, Italy. He has been helping Conrad with the Venice job for three years. Word has gotten back to Conrad that he has disappeared, and hasn't been seen since. Special agent Elizabeth Cohen learned of him from Conrad's drunken ex-wife Audrey when she told her about Paulson's sudden disappearance. Cohen does her due diligence, and discovered that there were rumors that Sabatini was moving stolen art for Conrad, but the Italian authorities could not find any evidence to support the claims. It is later revealed that Sabatini was kidnapped by the Italian mafia. He is then shot in the face by Captain Velenti who secretly works for the mafia.
- Sebastian Foxley He is Conrad's lawyer from London. He saves Conrad from being tortured by Don Parrino's goons that happen to be corrupt police officers. He explains to them that all charges have been dropped, and is to be released immediately. The reason for this because Celia has possession of Don's book that contains accounts of people worldwide that work for him, and the Italian prosecutor's name was in it. Celia blackmailed the prosecutor into dropping the charges. Sebastian and Conrad intend to sue the F.B.I. again.

=== The F.B.I. ===
- Special Agent Elizabeth Cohen She is a beautiful African-American woman. Her along with her partner Special Agent Nathan aka Nate, have been pursuing Conrad alias Redmond for a number of years. She is deceived by Audrey, to get her to Italy, so she can convince the Italian police to raid The Italian Mafia safehouse. She is not aware she is a pawn to get Conrad's team in to rob the paintings. She is held at gunpoint by The Italian Mafia's insider Captain Velenti. Conrad manages to save her only to be arrested. As she is interrogating Conrad with much anger for being used as a decoy, her boss Beverly Shannon walks in and tells her to leave. She states to Conrad that she will face disciplinary action; she is also under criminal investigation by the Italian police for killing one of their own. She is now described as a "rogue agent pursuing a personal vendetta" according to sources close to the case. She has been dismissed from the Bureau. For a couple of months she has been chain smoking, and drinking away her sorrows. After seeing a news report about her dramatic exit from the bureau, she has a moment of clarity and applies for a private investigator's license to make up for lost time, vowing to not let Redmond win.
- Special Agent Nathan He is Elizabeth Cohen's partner. His "do it by the book" approach to investigation often conflicts with Cohen's proactive style of work.
- Beverly Shannon She is a red-haired woman that is both Cohen and Nate's superior. She appears to be a cool and relaxed person, but when her temper flares up, she has a mouth like a sailor. She has a son named Micah. She is upset with Cohen for making a wrongful arrest on Conrad, for which the Bureau has to settle with Conrad for four million dollars, not to mention that she discovered that Cohen had gotten an unauthorized warrant to approach Conrad again. After Chase, Gardin, Chen, and Henry are released from holding due to Arno being part of the plan in stealing the heroin from the Feds, Beverly reprimands Cohen for going for Augustus Paulson without her permission, effectively relieving her of field duty. Cohen later goes to her based on a tip from her informant Emma, who is being held by Cristo's San Diego cartel. Bev states to Cohen that she is out of second chances, and to be sure that she wants to gamble her career on this. This leads to the Feds rescuing Emma and shutting down the San Diego cartel. She flies to Venice immediately after finding out Elizabeth Cohen followed Conrad, and killed Captain Velenti. She tells Elizabeth to leave the interrogation room. She speaks to Conrad explaining Cohen will face disciplinary action. She attempts to bribe Conrad with an expedited check for four million dollars from Cohen's previous wrongful arrest to keep quiet. Conrad responds to this by laughing in front of her face, knowing that he just pulled off the Venice job for millions, plus with this new harassment, he can sue the bureau for a lot more than the four million dollar settlement.

=== The Cartel ===
- Lola He is the leader of a Mexican Cartel. He comes to San Diego to "clean house" after learning that the San Diego branch was dismantled by the F.B.I. which was under Cristo's management. This was due to Emma calling Elizabeth Cohen. Lola is concerned that his men could be compromised and decides to take action. He has Augustus and Conrad kidnapped in the aftermath of the raid. With Augustus and Conrad captured, he kills his loyal men brutally in front of them. He proceeds to tell them that they have caused him much trouble. He blackmails Conrad by stating that if he doesn't receive ten million dollars in one month, he will murder the entire Paulson family. This leads Conrad to go to Arno to let him know that he is back on the Venice job. During the heist, Conrad reveals that they're going to make the Mafia think that the Cartel was responsible. In the aftermath of the heist, Arno has Lola meet with him at his mansion to pay the ten million on Conrad's behalf. It is then revealed that Arno gave up the whereabouts of Augustus all in an end-a-round to get Conrad to pull off the Venice job he had invested into three years ago. Arno questions Lola about an eyebrow on his keychain. The story of how it explains his name, is still a mystery.
- Cristo He is the manager of the San Diego branch of The Cartel. He has Emma kidnapped due to Augustus botching up a heist, and failing to pay back $200,000 for the heroin that's missing. He's a refined, but ruthless man who is about the "bottom line". In the aftermath of the raid, he is pacing around waiting for Conrad to call. When a henchman's cellphone rings, Cristo immediately takes the phone, and speaks irately thinking its Conrad, only for it to be Lola who is the leader. Lola states to him in Spanish that he is coming to San Diego personally. Cristo, knowing that he hired Augustus and started this chain of events which led to a dozen Cartel members arrested, and that the branch being dismantled would put him completely out of favor with Lola, ultimately takes a henchman's gun and shoots himself in the head to avoid Lola's wrath.

== Reception ==
The first three issues of the series sold out on their respective release dates. Erik Norris of IGN called the first issue "a satisfying introduction to this series that establishes the main cast with some great characterization and ends strongly with a cliffhanger that's sure to get me back next month." Iann Robinson of CraveOnline, while critical of some of the first issue's artistic elements and dialogue, said "Thief Of Thieves works well enough to give it the benefit of the doubt. Let’s hope Kirkman and his crew work out the kinks soon." Newsarama's Edward Kaye called the book's concept "solid [...] if not a bit clichéd, but I really don’t think that the premise is presented very well in [the] debut issue." Augie De Blieck Jr. of Comic Book Resources, in a review of the first issue, wrote "Thief of Thieves is off to a good start, setting things up nicely without feeling like 'just' a set-up issue."

After the release of the second issue, IGN's Jesse Schedeen remarked, "Two issues in, the series is proving itself to be very competent and well crafted", but that "the plot isn't exactly racing along, and readers are left with far too many questions about [...] the general course Redmond's story will be taking." Jason Clyma of Broken Frontier said that "initially it appeared that the core of Thieves would be Paulson's life of crime, but as the series progresses, it is entirely possible that his move to repair his life will become the central and most interesting aspect of the book."

== Collected editions ==
Title	Material collected	Publication date	ISBN
Thief of Thieves, Volume 1: I Quit	Thief of Thieves #1–7	September 2012	978-1607065920
Thief of Thieves, Volume 2: Help Me	Thief of Thieves #8–13	May 2013	978-1607066767
Thief of Thieves, Volume 3: Venice	Thief of Thieves #14–19	March 2014	978-1607068440
Thief of Thieves, Volume 4: The Hit List	Thief of Thieves #20–25	December 2014	978-1632150370
Thief of Thieves, Volume 5: Take Me	Thief of Thieves #26–31	March 2016	978-1632154019
Thief of Thieves, Volume 6: Gold Rush	Thief of Thieves #32–37	January 2017	978-1534300378
Thief of Thieves, Volume 7: Closure	Thief of Thieves #38–43	March 2019	978-1534310360

== Television adaptation ==
AMC is developing a television drama series based on the comic book. Chic Eglee will serve as the showrunner if the project is picked up to series. Kirkman said that "because of the success of The Walking Dead and my relationships with the people over at AMC, the conversation eventually comes up: 'What else are you working on? Is there anything else you have on the horizon that might be interesting to us?' I was able to talk to them about what I was doing with Thief of Thieves while I was developing it as a comic book series, so the show and the comic are more or less developing concurrently." More than a year after the original announcement, at the 2013 San Diego Comic-Con, Kirkman said the adaptation is still in development. "Sometimes that's a short process; sometimes that's a long process. For The Walking Dead, it was five years, but we're really very hopeful Thief of Thieves will keep going and make it to series. Fingers crossed!" By 2016, Kirkman was still working on the project. "Frustrating that I can't say more, I know. It's a long process but it's still in process."
