= Bulletproof Monk =

2003 film by Paul Hunter

- Theatrical release poster
- Directed by: Paul Hunter
- Written by: Ethan Reiff; Cyrus Voris
- Based on: Bulletproof Monk by Image Comics
- Produced by: Charles Roven; Terence Chang; John Woo; Douglas Segal
- Starring: Chow Yun-fat; Seann William Scott; Jaime King; Karel Roden; Victoria Smurfit; Roger Yuan
- Cinematography: Stefan Czapsky
- Edited by: Robert K. Lambert
- Music by: Éric Serra
- Production companies: Metro-Goldwyn-Mayer Pictures; Lakeshore Entertainment; Mosaic Media Group; Lion Rock Productions
- Distributed by: MGM Distribution Co.
- Release date: April 16, 2003
- Running time: 104 minutes
- Country: United States
- Language: English
- Budget: $52 million
- Box office: $37.7 million

Bulletproof Monk is a 2003 American action comedy film directed by Paul Hunter in his feature film directorial debut, and starring Chow Yun-fat, Seann William Scott, and Jaime King. The film is loosely based on the comic book written by Brett Lewis with art by Michael Avon Oeming. The film was shot in Toronto and Hamilton, Canada, and other locations that resemble New York City. Bulletproof Monk was released by MGM Distribution Co. on April 16, 2003 and received negative reviews from critics and was a commercial failure, earning $37.7 million worldwide on the budget of $52 million.

== Plot ==
In 1943 Tibet, a young monk is told that he has fulfilled a series of prophecies that mark him as his master's successor. Forgoing his name, the monk is entrusted with guarding a scroll with the power to keep its owner powerful, young, and immune to injury. The monk is forced to flee when Nazi soldiers, led by Colonel Strucker, siege the temple. Sixty years later, the nameless monk encounters and begins tailing a young pickpocket named Kar, suspecting he may make for a suitable successor based on his selfless nature. During a violent run-in with a local gang, Kar falls for a roguish young woman named Jade.

The following day, Jade attends an exhibition at a human rights museum presided over by Strucker's granddaughter, Nina, who secretly and ruthlessly spearheads her grandfather's ongoing hunt for the scroll. Afterwards, Jade chances upon Kar being lectured by the monk and asks him to return her necklace, which he had stolen to earn her esteem. The meeting is interrupted when the monk is spotted by Nina's mercenaries. With Kar, the monk arrives at a laundromat that secretly houses a group of monks who provide him shelter, and the monk offers to train him.

As Kar and the monk train in an abandoned warehouse, Nina's mercenaries come down on them in force. In the ensuing chase, Kar accidentally drops the scroll from the rooftop, where it is swiped by Nina; however, she later discovers the scroll is a fake. Angered, Nina visits Kar's home to track the pair down, murdering his employer. An ambitious monk then betrays the location of their hideout to Nina, forcing the pair to flee once again. The monk's allies are kidnapped and taken to Strucker's secret facility beneath the museum.

Seeking help, Kar and the monk visit Jade at her home, learning that she is the daughter of an imprisoned crime lord. The monk realizes that this fact has fulfilled the second prophecy. Suddenly, Nina and her men burst through Jade's windows in a surprise attack, knocking the monk out with a tranquilizer dart. Nina discovers that the scroll's true text is tattooed onto the monk's body and orders that he be taken alive. Jade surmises where the monk was taken and chooses to help rescue him, intent on making Nina pay for her crimes.

The monk awakens to Nina sensually undressing him and scanning his tattoos, compiling the scroll's text into her grandfather's computer. Strucker's reading is interrupted when Jade and Kar launch an explosive attack on the museum, killing most of Nina's men in the blast. Jade and Kar infiltrate the facility through an underground water main, where Kar is swept away by a sudden rush of water. Jade is intercepted in the tunnels by Nina, this time dressed in a tight military-style jumpsuit and concealing a sai. Despite Nina's initial advantage, Jade manages to incapacitate her with a kick to the leg, breaking her shin. Jade pulls the defeated Nina into a chokehold and snaps her neck, finishing her off for good.

Strucker regains his youth after reading from the scroll; however, he finds that the last verse is missing. Before Strucker can scan the monk's brain for it, Kar arrives and distracts him, allowing the monk to break free. While Jade works to free the other monks, the nameless monk fights Strucker alongside Kar, eventually sending him plummeting off the roof. The three reunite inside the museum and the power of the scroll transfers to Kar, as he has fulfilled the third prophecy. Strucker reappears and attempts to kill the three, but is killed himself by a falling statue. Kar is surprised to find Jade alive after seemingly being shot; like Kar, she also fulfilled the three prophecies, and the scroll's power transferred to her as well. The monk, now aged, meets with Kar and Jade the next day, giving each one half of the final verse, deeming them inseparable. The pair wish him a good vacation from his duties before departing to fulfill their new roles.

== Cast ==
- Chow Yun-fat as Monk with No Name
- Seann William Scott as Kar
- Jaime King as Jade "Bad Girl" Kerensky
- Karel Roden as Strucker
- Victoria Smurfit as Nina Strucker
- Roger Yuan as Master Monk
- Mako as Mr. Kojima
- Marcus Jean Pirae as "Funktastic"
- Russell Yuen as Brother Tenzin

== Production ==
In May 2000, it was announced MGM had paid high six figures against a potential seven-figure deal to turn the cult comic Bulletproof Monk into a live-action film that would star Chow Yun-fat as the title character with John Woo and Terence Chang’s Lion Rock Productions producing. Seann William Scott was cast in November 2001.

== Reception ==
=== Box office ===
The film grossed approximately $23 million in the United States, with a worldwide total of $37 million, less than the production budget of $52 million.

=== Critical response ===
On Rotten Tomatoes, the film has an approval rating of 23% based on 132 reviews. The site's consensus reads: "Venerable action star Chow Yun-Fat is the only saving grace in this silly action flick that more often than not resembles a commercial in style." On Metacritic it has a score of 40% based on reviews from 29 critics, indicating "mixed or average" reviews. Audiences surveyed by CinemaScore gave the film a grade B on scale of A to F.

Roger Ebert of the Chicago Sun-Times gave it 2 out of 4 stars and wrote: "The fight scenes in Bulletproof Monk are not as inventive as some I've seen (although the opening fight on a rope bridge is so well done that it raises expectations it cannot fulfill)." Robert Koehler of Variety wrote "adults will likely object to the innumerable plot question marks coming off the screen like so many kung-fu kicks to the head." Koehler compared the film to Hong Kong action movies, noting that the fights are relatively tame, but the visual effects are generally excellent. Jamie Russell at the BBC gave it 3/5 stars and called it "Truly naff, but endearingly silly."

David Edelstein of Slate contended that Bulletproof Monk was "Crouching Tiger, Hidden Dragon for the American Pie audience"; panning its poor special effects and cinematography (the former he compared to an "afternoon Japanese kiddie series"), and concluded that "they made a ton of junky movies in Hong Kong, but those were dazzlingly fluid and high-flying junky movies. This American retread has the same sort of hack plot but none of the bravura. It makes them look like monkeys, and not bulletproof ones." Bill Stamets of the Chicago Reader panned Bulletproof Monk for having "routine" fight scenes and juvenile humor, and that "the film plays off Chow's imperturbable persona, but the Tibetan philosophy boils down to the paradox of hot dogs coming ten to a package while buns are sold in sets of eight."

== Unreleased video game ==
From reports by IGN as early as September 2002, MGM was working with Empire Interactive to produce a video game adaptation of Bulletproof Monk. This adaptation, developed by Mucky Foot Productions, was announced in February 2003. However, after Mucky Foot's closure later that year, it ultimately went unreleased.
