= Zero Girl =

Five-issue comic book

Zero Girl trade paperback cover.

Zero Girl is a five-issue comic book written and illustrated by Sam Kieth, and published by Homage Comics (an imprint of DC Comics).

== Plot ==
The plot concerns high school student Amy Smootster, and her attempts to start a relationship with her guidance counselor Tim. Another plot thread follows her relationship with circles and squares – it seems that circular objects tend to help or defend her, while squares try to hurt her. All of this has something to do with her feet producing copious but never-defined fluid when she feels shame.

A five-issue follow-up story, set fifteen years later, called Zero Girl: Full Circle, put Amy and Tim in the background and focused on Tim's daughter, Nikki.

== Allusions ==
This work contains one reference to Kieth's most famous work, The Maxx – Tim describes that he bought his yellow bug from "that chick named Julie" (a character in The Maxx). When Amy asks for clarification, Tim replies, "That's another story".

The character "Jim" who makes a brief cameo in Zero Girl: Full Circle is Sarah's friend Jimmy from The Maxx.

== Editions ==
Both of the series have been collected into trade paperbacks:

- Zero Girl, ISBN 1-56389-851-9
- Zero Girl: Full Circle, ISBN 1-4012-0170-9
