= Penny Mickelbury =

American journalist (born 1948)

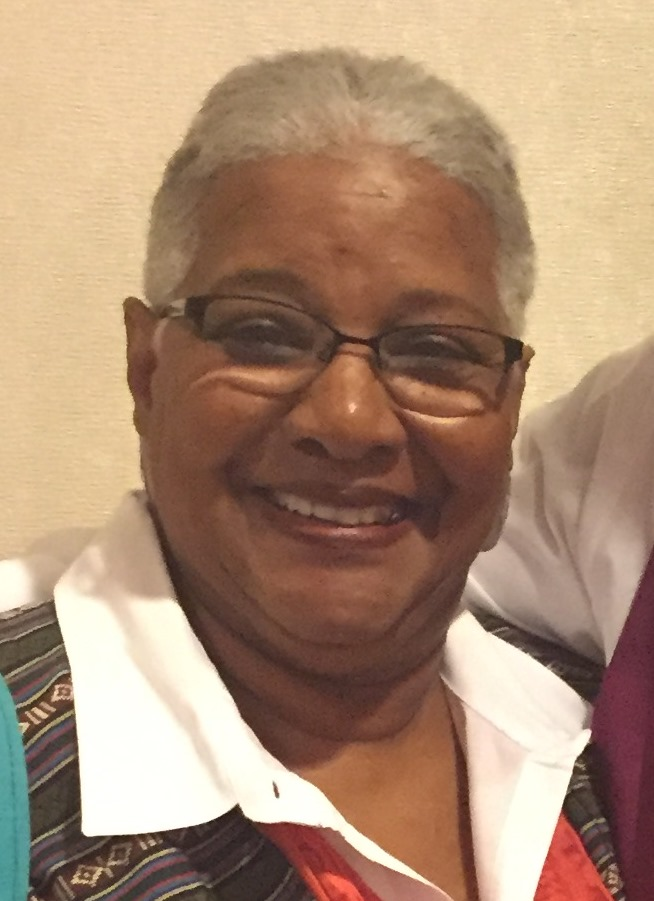
- Mickelbury in 2017
- Born: May 31, 1948 (age 78); Atlanta, Georgia, U.S.
- Occupations: Novelist; playwright; teacher; journalist
- Writing career
- Genres: Fiction, crime fiction, mystery, historical fiction, stageplays
- Website: www/pennymickelbury.com

Penny Mickelbury (born May 31, 1948) is an African-American playwright, short story writer, mystery series writer, and historical novelist who worked as a print and television journalist for ten years before concentrating on fiction writing. After leaving journalism, she taught fiction and script writing in Los Angeles and saw two of her plays (Waiting for Gabriel and Hush Now) produced there. She began writing detective novels with Keeping Secrets, published by Naiad Press in 1994, in the first of a series featuring Gianna Maglione, a lesbian chief of a hate-crimes unit based in Washington, D.C., and her lover 'Mimi Patterson', a journalist. Her second series of four books features Carole Ann Gibson, a Washington, D.C., attorney, who is widowed in the first book and subsequently runs an investigation agency with Jake Graham, the detective who investigated her husband's death. Her third series features Phil Rodriguez, a Puerto Rican private investigator on the Lower Easter Side of New York City. Mickelbury has also written short story collections and historical novels highlighting the Black experience in America.

== Selected plays ==
- Time Out (produced 1989)
- Waiting for Gabriel (produced 1991, re-staged 2000)
- Warm Robes of Remembrance (1993)
- Hush Now (produced 2000)

== Novels, short stories, and anthologies ==
=== Gianna Maglione novels ===
- Keeping Secrets: A Gianna Maglione Mystery, Naiad Press, 1994
- Nights Songs: A Gianna Maglione Mystery, Naiad Press, 1995
- Love Notes, Naiad Press, 2002
- Darkness Descending, 2005
- Death's Echoes, Bywater Books, 2018
- You Can't Die But Once, Bywater Books, 2020

=== Carole Ann Gibson novels ===
- One Must Wait, Simon & Schuster, 1998
- Where to Choose, Simon & Schuster, 1999
- The Step Between, Simon & Schuster, 2000
- Paradise Interrupted, Simon & Schuster, 2001

=== Phil Rodriguez novels ===
- Two Graves Dug, Five Star Press, 2005
- A Murder Too Close, Five Star Press, 2008

=== Historical novels ===
- Belle City, Whitepoint Press, 2014
- Two Wings To Fly Away, Bywater Books, 2019
- Two Wings To Hide My Face, Bywater Books, 2025

=== Short story collections ===
- That Part of My Face: Short Stories, 2016
- God's Will and Other Lies: Stories, BLF Press, 2019

=== Anthologies ===
Stories included in:

- The Mysterious Naiad, ed. Grier and Forrest, Naiad, 1994
- Spooks, Spies and Private Eyes: Black Mystery, Crime and Suspense Fiction, ed. Paula L. Woods, Doubleday, 1995
- Shades of Black: Crime and Mystery Stories by African-American Authors, ed. Eleanor Taylor Bland, Berkley Prime Crime Press, 2004
- Send My Love and a Molotov Cocktail, ed. Gary Phillips and Andrea Gibbons, PM Press, 2011

== Awards and recognition ==
=== Literary awards ===
- 1995 Lambda Literary Award Finalist, Night Songs, Naiad
- 2001 Golden Pen Award, National Black Writer's Alliance, for Paradise Interrupted
- 2005 Lambda Literary Award Finalist, Darkness Descending, Kings Crossing
- 2019 Golden Crown Literary Award Finalist, Death's Echoes, Bywater Books
- 2019 Independent Book Publisher Award, Bronze winner, Death’s Echoes, Bywater Books
- 2020 Golden Crown Literary Award Finalist, Two Wings to Fly Away, Bywater Books
- 2020 Alice B Readers Award for career achievement
- 2025 Golden Crown Literary Society Winner, Trailblazer Award for life and career achievement

=== Recognition ===
- 1998 Residency at the Hedgebrook Women Writers Retreat
- 2001 Prix du Roman d'Adventures from Les Éditions du Masque for the Carole Ann Gibson mystery series
- 2003 Audre Lorde Estate Grant
- 2017 Special Keynote Speaker at the Golden Crown Literary Society conference
- 2019 Inducted with the Washington Post Metro Seven into the National Association of Black Journalists Hall of Fame
