= List of Wildstorm reprint collections =

The following is a list of Wildstorm reprint collections, detailing collected works of Wildstorm comic books.

== Wildstorm Universe ==
| Title | Volume | Subtitle | Issues Collected | Notes | ISBN |
|---|---|---|---|---|---|
| 21 Down | | The Conduit | 21 Down #1-6 | | 1401201202 |
| Alan Moore | | The Complete WILDC.A.T.S | WildCATS #21 - 34, story from #50. | | 1401215459 |
| Alan Moore | | Wild Worlds | Deathblow: Byblows (1999) #1-3, Spawn/WildC.A.T.s (1996) #1-4, Voodoo (1997) #1-4, WildC.A.T.s: Covert Action Teams (1992) #50, Wildstorm Spotlight (1997) #1 | | 1401213790 |
| The Authority | vol 1 | Relentless | The Authority (1999) #1-8 | | 1563896613 |
| The Authority | vol 2 | Under New Management | The Authority (1999) #9-16 | | 1563897563 |
| The Authority | vol 3 | Earth Inferno & Other Stories | The Authority (1999) #17-20, Annual 2000 and a story from Wildstorm Summer Special #1 | | 1563898543 |
| The Authority | vol 4 | Transfer of Power | The Authority (1999) #22-29 | | 1401200206 |
| The Authority | vol 1 | Absolute | The Authority (1999) #1-12 | | 1563898829 |
| The Authority | vol 2 | Absolute | The Authority (1999) #13-29 | | 1401200974 |
| The Authority | vol 1 | | The Authority (1999) #1-12 | hardcover, released 2013; softcover, released 2014 | 1401247075 |
| The Authority | vol 2 | | The Authority (1999) #13-29 | hardcover, released 2013; softcover, released 2014 | 1401242758 |
| The Authority | | Jenny Sparks: The Secret History of the Authority | Jenny Sparks: The Secret History of the Authority (2000) #1-5 | | 1563897695 |
| The Authority | vol 5 | Harsh Realities | The Authority (2003) #0-5 | | 1401202780 |
| The Authority | vol 6 | Fractured Worlds | The Authority (2003) #6-14 | | 1401203000 |
| The Authority | | Human on the Inside | | original graphic novel; written by John Ridley | 1401200699 |
| The Authority | book 1 | Revolution | The Authority: Revolution (2004) #1-6 | continues out of "Coup d'Etat | 1401206239 |
| The Authority | book 2 | Revolution | The Authority: Revolution (2004) #7-12 | | 1401209475 |
| The Authority | | Prime | The Authority: Prime #1-6 | | 1401218342 |
| The Authority | book 1 | The Lost Year | The Authority (2006) #1-2, The Authority: The Lost Year #3-7 | continuing Grant Morrison's aborted 2006 run | 140122749X |
| The Authority | vol 1 | World's End | The Authority(2008) #1-7 | continues out of "Name of the Beast" | 1401223621 |
| The Authority | vol 2 | World's End: Rule Brittania | The Authority (2008) #8-17 | | 1401226671 |
| The Authority | | Kev | The Authority: Kev #1 (2002), The Authority: More Kev #1-4 (2004) | Garth Ennis and Glenn Fabry | 140120614X |
| The Authority | | The Magnificent Kevin | The Authority: The Magnificent Kevin #1-5 (2006) | Garth Ennis and Carlos Ezquerra | 1401213243 |
| Backlash/Spider-man | | | Backlash/Spider-man (1996) #1-2 | | 1887279474 |
| Black Ops | | | Black Ops (2006) #1-5 | | 1887279326 |
| Coup D'État | | | Coup D'État: Sleeper (2004) #1, Coup D'État: Stormwatch (2004) #1, Coup D'État: Authority (2004) #1, Coup D'État: Wildcats v3.0 (2004) #1, Coup D'État: Afterward (2004) #1 | | 1401205704 |
| Deathblow | | Sinners and Saints | Deathblow (1993) #1-12 | | B005KFFBY0 |
| Deathblow | | | Deathblow (1993) #0-12, Darker Image #1 | deluxe hardcover | 1401247601 |
| Deathblow | | Deathblow/Wolverine | Deathblow/Wolverine (1996) 1-2 | written and illustrated by Aron Wiesenfeld | 188727961X |
| Deathblow | | Batman/Deathblow: After the Fire | Batman/Deathblow: After the Fire (2002) #1-3 | written by Brian Azzarello; also printed in deluxe edition | 140123772X |
| Deathblow | | And Then you Live! | Deathblow (2006) #1-9 | written by Brian Azzarello | 1401215157 |
| Divine Right | vol 1 | The Adventures of Max Faraday | Divine Right (1997) #1/2, 1-7 | | 1563896524 |
| Divine Right | vol 2 | | Divine Right (1997) #8-12, Divine Intervention: Gen 13 #1, Divine Intervention: Wildcats #1 | | 1563898756 |
| DV8 | | Neighborhood Threat | DV8 (1994) #1-6 and ½ | written by Warren Ellis | 1563899272 |
| DV8 | | Gods and Monsters | DV8 (2011) #1-8 | written by Brian Wood | 1401229735 |
| Gen13 | | Who They Are and How They Came to Be | Gen13 (1994) #1-5 | original mini series | 1563894963 |
| Gen13 | | Staring Over | Gen 13 (1995) #1-7 | first ongoing series | 1563895447 |
| Gen13 | | Lost In Paradise | Gen 13 (1995) #3-5 | | 188727930X |
| Gen13 | | European Vacation | Gen 13 (1995) #6-7 | art by Jim Lee | 1887279601 |
| Gen13 | | #13 A, B & C Collected Edition | Gen 13 (1995) #13a, #13b, #13c | | 1887279660 |
| Gen13 | | I Love New York | Gen 13 (1995) #25-29 | new creative team - John Arcudi & Gary Frank | 1563895439 |
| Gen13 | | Meanwhile... | Gen 13 (1995) #43, 44, 66-70 | written by Adam Warren | 1401200621 |
| Gen13 | | We'll Take Manhattan | Gen 13 (1995) #45-50 | written by Scott Lobdell | 1563896621 |
| Gen13 | | Superhuman Like You | Gen 13 (1995) #60-65 | written by Adam Warren | 1563898772 |
| Gen13 | | September Song | GEN 13 (2002) #0-6 | second ongoing series, written by Chris Claremont | 1401201229 |
| Gen13 | vol 1 | Best of a Bad Lot | Gen 13 (2006) #1-6 | written by Gail Simone | 1563897660 |
| Gen13 | vol 2 | Road Trip | Gen13 (2006) #7-13 | | 1401216498 |
| Gen13 | vol 3 | 15 Minutes | Gen 13 (2006) #14-20 | written by Simon Oliver | 1401220029 |
| Gen13 | vol 4 | World's End | Gen 13 (2006) #21-26 | | 1401224881 |
| Gen13 | | Superman/Gen 13 | Superman/Gen^{13} (2000) #1-3 | by Adam Hughes and Lee Bermejo | 1563897679 |
| Gen13 | | Ordinary Heroes | Gen 13: Ordinary Heroes (1996) #1-2 | by Adam Hughes | 1401204279 |
| Grifter & Midnighter | | | Grifter & Midnighter (2008) #1-6 | Written by Chuck Dixon Art by Ryan Benjamin & Saleem Crawford | 1401216277 |
| Midnighter | vol 1 | Killing Machine | Midnighter (2007) #1-6 | | 1401214770 |
| Midnighter | vol 2 | Anthem | Midnighter (2007) #7 and 10-15 | | 1401216706 |
| Midnighter | vol 3 | Assassin8 | Midnighter (2007) #16-20 and 8-9 | | 1401220010 |
| The Monarchy | | Bullets Over Babylon | The Authority #21, The Monarchy #1-4 | Doselle Young and John McCrea | 1-56389-859-4 |
| Majestic | | Mr Majestic | Mr Majestic (2002) #1-6, Wildstorm Spotlight #1 | | 1563896591 |
| Majestic | | Strange New Visitor | Majestic (2004) #1-4, Action Comics #811, Adventures of Superman #624, Superman #201 | | 140120483X |
| Majestic | vol 1 | While You Were Out | Majestic (2005) #1-7 | | 1401208509 |
| Majestic | vol 2 | Meanwhile, back on Earth... | Majestic (2005) #8-12 | | 1401209890 |
| Majestic | vol 3 | the Final Cut | Majestic (2005) #13-17, Wildstorm Winter Special #1 | | 1401212115 |
| Planetary | vol 1 | All over the World and other Stories | Planetary (1999) #1-6 and Planetary Preview | collected in hardcover and trade paperback | 1563896486 |
| Planetary | vol 2 | The Fourth Man | Planetary (1999) #7-12 | collected in hardcover and trade paperback | 1563897644 |
| Planetary | vol 3 | Leaving the 20th Century | Planetary (1999) #13-18 | collected in hardcover and trade paperback | 1401202942 |
| Planetary | vol 4 | Spacetime Archaeology | Planetary (1999) #19-27 | collected in hardcover and trade paperback | 1401223451 |
| Planetary | vol 1 | Absolute | Planetary (1999) #1-12 and Planetary Preview | | 1401203272 |
| Planetary | vol 2 | Absolute | Planetary (1999) #13-27 | | 1401227015 |
| Planetary | | Crossing Worlds | Planetary/Batman (2003) #1, Planetary/JLA (2002) #1, Planetary/The Authority: Ruling The World (2000) #1 | | 1401202799 |
| Planetary | | Batman/Planetary | Planetary/Batman (2003) #1 plus original script | deluxe hardcover | 1401231845 |
| Planetary | | Omnibus | Planetary (1999) #1-27, Planetary Preview, Planetary/Batman (2003) #1, Planetary/JLA (2002) #1, Planetary/The Authority: Ruling The World (2000) #1 | | 1401242383 |
| Sleeper | | Point Blank | Point Blank (2002) #1-5 | | 1401201164 |
| Sleeper | vol 1 | Out in the Cold | Sleeper (2003) #1-6 | | 1401201156 |
| Sleeper | vol 2 | All False Moves | Sleeper (2003) #7-12 | | 1401202888 |
| Sleeper | | Season One | Sleeper (2003) #1-12 | | 1401223605 |
| Sleeper | vol 3 | A Crooked Line | Sleeper: Season Two (2004) #1-6 | | 1401206182 |
| Sleeper | vol 4 | The Long Way Home | Sleeper: Season Two (2004) #7-12 | | 1401206271 |
| Sleeper | | Season Two | Sleeper: Season Two (2004) #1-12 | | 1401224938 |
| Sleeper | | Omnibus | Point Blank (2002) #1-5, Sleeper (2003) #1-12, Sleeper: Season Two (2004) #1-12, Coup d'État: Sleeper #1, Coup d'État: Afterword #1 | | 1401238033 |
| Stormwatch | vol 1 | Force of Nature | Stormwatch (1993) #37-42 | | 156389646X |
| Stormwatch | vol 2 | Lightning Strikes | Stormwatch (1993) #43-47 | | 1563896508 |
| Stormwatch | vol 3 | Change or Die | Stormwatch (1993) #48-50, Stormwatch Preview (1997), Stormwatch (1997) #1-3 | | 156389534X |
| Stormwatch | vol 4 | A Finer World | Stormwatch (1997) #4-9 | | 1563895358 |
| Stormwatch | vol 5 | Final Orbit | Stormwatch (1997) #10-11, WildC.A.T.S/Aliens (1998) #1 | | 1563897881 |
| Stormwatch | vol 1 | | Stormwatch (1993) #37-47 | collected in hardcover and trade paperback | 1401234216 |
| Stormwatch | vol 2 | | Stormwatch (1993) #48-50, Stormwatch Preview (1997), Stormwatch (1997) #1-11 | collected in hardcover and trade paperback | 1401237274 |
| Stormwatch: Team Achilles | vol 1 | | Stormwatch: Team Achilles (2002) #1-6 and pages from Stormwatch Wizard Preview | | 1401201032 |
| Stormwatch: Team Achilles | vol 2 | | Stormwatch: Team Achilles (2002) #7-11 pages from the Eye of the Storm Annual | | 1401201237 |
| Stormwatch: PhD | vol 1 | | Stormwatch: PhD #1-4, 6-7 and pages from Worldstorm #1 (2006) | | 1401215009 |
| Stormwatch: PhD | vol 2 | | Stormwatch: PhD #5, 8-12 | | 1401216781 |
| Stormwatch: PhD | vol 3 | World's End | Stormwatch: PhD #13-19 | part of the "World's End" era | 140122489X |
| Team Seven | | | Team 7 (1994) #1-4 | | B0006R0ENU |
| Team Zero | | | Team Zero (2006) #1-6 | | 1401217362 |
| Welcome to Tranquility | vol 1 | | #1-6 | | 1401215165 |
| Welcome to Tranquility | vol 2 | | #7-12 | | 1401217737 |
| Welcome to Tranquility | | One Foot in the Grave | #1-6 | | 1401231756 |
| Wetworks | | Rebirth | Wetworks (1994) #1-3, pages from WildC.A.T.S #2 | | 1887279334 |
| Wetworks | vol 1 | | Wetworks (2006) #1-5, Coup d'État: Afterword #1 | written by Mike Carey | 1401213758 |
| Wetworks | vol 2 | | Wetworks (2006) #6-15 | | 1401216390 |
| WildC.A.T.s | | Compendium | WildC.A.T.S (1992) #1-4 | collected as hardcover and trade paperback; polybagged with WildC.A.T.S #0 | B000W27O28 |
| WildC.A.T.s | | Trilogy: Way of the Coda | WildC.A.T.S Trilogy (1992) #1-3 | illustrated by Jae Lee | 1563895714 |
| WildC.A.T.s | | Killer Instinct | WildC.A.T.S (1992) #5-7 + CYBER FORCE #1-3 | Homage Studios crossover | 1401203221 |
| WildC.A.T.s | | A Gathering of Eagles | WildC.A.T.S (1992) #10-13 | written by Chris Claremont | 1887279458 |
| WildC.A.T.s | | James Robinson's Complete WildC.A.T.s | WildC.A.T.S (1992) #15-20, part of 50, Wildstorm Rising #1, Team One: WildC.A.T.S #1-2, WildC.A.T.S Annual #1 | written by James Robinson | 1401222048 |
| WildC.A.T.s | | Homecoming | WildC.A.T.S (1992) #21-27 | written by Alan Moore | 156389582X |
| WildC.A.T.s | | Gang War | WildC.A.T.S (1992) #28-34 | written by Alan Moore | 1563895609 |
| WildC.A.T.s | | WildC.A.T.s/X-Men | WildC.A.T.s/X-Men: The Golden Age (1997), WildC.A.T.s/X-Men: The Silver Age (1997), WildC.A.T.s/X-Men: The Modern Age (1997), WildC.A.T.s/X-Men: The Dark Age (1998) | crossover with Marvel Comics' X-MEN | 1582400229 |
| WildCats | | Street Smart | Wildcats (1999) #1-6 | collected as hardcover and trade paperback; written by Scott Lobdell/art by Travis Charest | 1563896583 |
| WildCats | | Vicious Circles | Wildcats (1999) # 8-13 | start of Joe Casey run as writer. Sean Phillips on art. | 156389761X |
| WildCats | | Serial Boxes | Wildcats (1999) #14-19 | | 1563897660 |
| WildCats | | Battery Park | Wildcats (1999) #20-28 | features Phillips and Steve Dillon on art (#20-21). | 1401200354 |
| WildCats v3.0 | vol 1 | Brand Building | Wildcats v3.0 (2002) #1-6 | Joe Casey and artist Dustin Nguyen | 1401201199 |
| WildCats v3.0 | vol 2 | Full Disclosure | Wildcats v3.0 (2002) #7-12 | | 1401202764 |
| WildCats v3.0 | | Year 1 | Wildcats v3.0 (2002) #1-12 | | 1401228569 |
| WildCats v3.0 | | Year 2 | Wildcats v3.0 (2002) #13-24 | | 1401230504 |
| Wildcats | | Nemesis | WildCATS: Nemesis (2005) #1-9 | mini series | 1401211054 |
| Wildcats: World's End | Book 1 | World's End | Wildcats (2008) #1-7 | start of Christos Gage era | 140122363X |
| Wildcats: World's End | Book 2 | Family Secrets | Wildcats (2008) #8-12, Worldstorm #2 | | 140122668X |
| Wildstorm Rising (1995) | | | Team 7: Objective: Hell (Team 7 vol. 2) #1, Wildstorm Rising #1, WildC.A.T.s vol.1, #20, Union vol.2, #4, Gen^{13} vol.2, #2, Grifter vol.1, #1, Deathblow vol.1, #16, Wetworks vol 1 #8, Backlash #8, Stormwatch vol.1, #22, Wildstorm Rising #2 | first company-wide crossover | 1887279237 |
| Wildstorm | | Armageddon | Midnighter: Armageddon (2007) #1, Welcome To Tranquility: Armageddon (2008) #1, Wetworks: Armageddon (2008) #1, Gen13: Armageddon (2008) #1, Stormwatch: P.H.D.: Armageddon (2008) #1, Wildcats: Armageddon (2008) #1 | bi-weekly; continues in Revelations | 1401217036 |
| Wildstorm | | Revelations | #1-6 | bi-weekly; continues in Number of the Beast | 1401218679 |
| Wildstorm | | Number of the Beast | #1-8 | | 1401219993 |
| Wildstorm | | After the Fall | collected back-up stories from: THE AUTHORITY #1-11, WILDCATS #1-11, GEN13 #21-28 and STORMWATCH PHD #13-20 | | 1401226698 |

== Homage ==
| Title | Volume | Subtitle | Issues Collected | Notes |
|---|---|---|---|---|
| Astro City | | Astro City: Local Heroes | | Hard Cover |
| Astro City | | Life in the Big City | Astro City Vol. 1 #1-6 | |
| Astro City | | Confession | Astro City Vol. 2 #1/2, 4-9 | |
| Astro City | | Family Album | Astro City Vol. 2 #1-3, 10-13 | |
| Astro City | | Tarnished Angel | Astro City Vol. 2 #14-20 | |
| Astro City | | The Dark Age Book One | Astro City: The Dark Age Book One #1 - 8. | |
| Arrowsmith | | So Smart in their Uniforms | #1-6 | |

== Wildstorm Signature Series ==
| Title | Volume | Subtitle | Issues Collected | Notes |
|---|---|---|---|---|
| Albion | | | | |
| The American Way | | | #1-8 | |
| Ex Machina | vol 1 | The First Hundred Days | Ex Machina #1-5 | |
| Ex Machina | vol 2 | Tag | Ex Machina #6-10 | |
| Ex Machina | vol 3 | Fact V. Fiction | Ex Machina #11-16 | |
| Ex Machina | vol 4 | March to War | Ex Machina #17-20 and Ex Machina Special #1-2 | |
| Ex Machina | vol 5 | Smoke Smoke | Ex Machina #21-25 | |
| Ex Machina | vol 6 | Power Down | Ex Machina #26-29 and Inside the Machine Special | |
| Ex Machina | vol 7 | Ex Cathedra | Ex Machina #30-34 | |
| Ex Machina | vol 8 | Dirty Tricks | Ex Machina #35-39 and Ex Machina Special #3 | |
| Ex Machina | vol 9 | Ring Out the Old | Ex Machina #40-44 and Ex Machina Special #4 | |
| Ex Machina | vol 10 | Term Limits | Ex Machina #45-50 | |
| Ex Machina | book 1 | The Deluxe Edition | Ex Machina #1-11 | collected in both Hardcover and trade paperback |
| Ex Machina | book 2 | The Deluxe Edition | Two Ex Machina #12-20 and Ex Machina Special #1-2 | collected in both Hardcover and trade paperback |
| Ex Machina | book 3 | The Deluxe Edition | Ex Machina #21-29, Ex Machina Special #3 and Inside the Machine Special | collected in both Hardcover and trade paperback |
| Ex Machina | book 4 | The Deluxe Edition | Ex Machina #30-40 | collected in both Hardcover and trade paperback |
| Ex Machina | book 5 | The Deluxe Edition | Ex Machina #41-50 and Ex Machina Special #4 | collected in both Hardcover and trade paperback |

== America's Best Comics (ABC) ==
| Title | Volume | Subtitle | Issues Collected | Notes |
|---|---|---|---|---|
| Grey Shirt | | Indigo Sunset | Greyshirt: Indigo Sunset #1-5 | written & illustrated by Rick Veitch |
| The League of Extraordinary Gentlemen | vol 1 | | #1-6 | collected in both Hardcover and trade paperback |
| The League of Extraordinary Gentlemen | vol 2 | | #1-6 | collected in both Hardcover and trade paperback |
| The League of Extraordinary Gentlemen | | The Black Dossier | | original graphic novel; collected in both Hardcover and trade paperback |
| Promethea | Book 1 | | #1-6 | collected in both Hardcover and trade paperback |
| Promethea | Book 2 | | #7-12 | collected in both Hardcover and trade paperback |
| Promethea | Book 3 | | #13-18 | collected in both Hardcover and trade paperback |
| Promethea | Book 4 | | #19-25 | collected in both Hardcover and trade paperback |
| Promethea | Book 5 | | #26-32 | collected in both Hardcover and trade paperback |
| Promethea | Book 1 | Absolute | #1-12 | |
| Promethea | Book 2 | Absolute | #13-23 | |
| Promethea | Book 3 | Absolute | #24-32 | |
| Tom Strong | Book 1 | | #1-7 | collected in both Hardcover and trade paperback |
| Tom Strong | Book 2 | | #8-14 | collected in both Hardcover and trade paperback |
| Tom Strong | Book 3 | | #15-19 | collected in both Hardcover and trade paperback |
| Tom Strong | Book 4 | | #21-25 | collected in both Hardcover and trade paperback |
| Tom Strong | Book 5 | | #26-30 | collected in both Hardcover and trade paperback |
| Tom Strong | Book 6 | | #31-36 | collected in both Hardcover and trade paperback |
| Tom Strong | | and the Robots of Doom | Tom Strong and the Robots of Doom (2010) #1-6 | written by Peter Hogan |
| Tom Strong | | and the Planet of Peril | tom Strong and the Planet of Peril (2013) #1-6 | written by Peter Hogan |
| Terra Obscura | vol 1 | | Terra Obscura #1-6 | spin-off of Tom Strong written by Peter Hogan |
| Terra Obscura | vol 2 | | Terra Obscura v2 #1-6 | spin-off of Tom Strong written by Peter Hogan |
| Terra Obscura | | S.M.A.S.H of Two Worlds | Terra Obscura #1-6, Terra Obscura v2 #1-6, material from ABC: A-Z, Terra Obscura and Splash Brannigan #1 | spin-off of Tom Strong written by Peter Hogan |
| Top 10 | Book 1 | | #1-7 | collected in both Hardcover and trade paperback |
| Top 10 | Book 2 | | #8-12 | collected in both Hardcover and trade paperback |
| Top 10 | | Smax | #1-5 | collected in both Hardcover and trade paperback |
| Top 10 | | The Forty-Niners | | original graphic novel; collected in both Hardcover and trade paperback |
| Top 10 | | Absolute | Top 10 #1-12, Top 10: The Forty-Niners OGN, Smax #1-5 and material from America's Best Comics Special (2001) #1 | |
| Top 10 | | Beyond the Farthest Precinct | Top 10: Beyond the Farthest Precinct #1-5 | written by Paul Di Filippo |
| Tomorrow's Stories | Book 1 | | Tomorrow's Stories #1-6 | |
| Tomorrow's Stories | Book 2 | | Tomorrow's Stories #7-12 | |
