= Darker Image =

Comic book

Cover of Darker Image #1

Darker Image was an American comic book series published by Image Comics. The series was intended as 4-issue miniseries, serving as an introduction to three "grim and gritty" characters. The series, however, only had one published issue, published in March 1993.

A gold logo incentive variant as well as the ‘platinum’ (black and white with silver foil logo) version of this issue exists. Each issue when new was polybagged with one of three trading cards, The Maxx, Bloodwulf and Deathblow.

In 18 October 2021, a group of fans created a fanzine called Darkest Image, a 200-page anthology series that feature several characters from the Image universe of the 1990s. All profits from the sale are donated to the Comic Book Legal Defense Fund.

== Contents ==
Issue #1 features these three stories:

- "The Maxx" (8 pp.) by Sam Kieth and William Messner-Loebs
- "Bloodwulf" (9 pp.) by Rob Liefeld
- "Deathblow" (9 pp.) by Jim Lee and Brandon Choi
