= The Maxx =

American comic book series created by Sam Kieth

- Sam Kieth, The Maxx #1 (March 1993)

Publication information
- Publisher: Image Comics; IDW Publishing
- Schedule: Monthly
- Format: Ongoing series
- Genre: Fantasy; Black comedy; Comedy drama; Drama; Superhero
- Publication date: March 1993 – August 1998
- No. of issues: 35
- Main character(s): The Maxx; Julie Winters; Mr. Gone

Creative team
- Created by: Sam Kieth
- Written by: Sam Kieth (1–35); Alan Moore (21); Bill Messner-Loebs (1–15, 17–20, 22–23)
- Artist(s): Sam Kieth; Chance Wolf; Tony Kelly; Kell-O-Graphics
- Penciller: Sam Kieth
- Inker: Jim Sinclair
- Letterer(s): Mike Heisler; Ken Bruzenak
- Colorist(s): Steve Oliff; Olyoptics

Collected editions
- Volume 1: ISBN 1-4012-0124-5

The Maxx is an American comic book series created by Sam Kieth in 1993 and originally published monthly until 1998 by Image Comics for 35 issues, before being collected in trade paperback by DC Comics' Wildstorm imprint. The first appearance of the titular character was in Darker Image #1 by Image Comics in March 1993. The comic book, starring an eponymous purple-clad hero, spawned a 13-episode animated series on MTV that originally aired April–June 1995. Starting in November 2013 and ending in September 2016, the original series has been republished by IDW as The Maxx: Maxximized with new colors and improved scans of the original artwork by Sam Kieth and Jim Sinclair. In 2018, the Maxx featured in a five-issue crossover series with Batman, published by IDW.

The series follows the adventures of the titular hero in two worlds: the real world and an alternate reality referred to as the Outback. In the real world, Maxx is a vagrant, a "homeless man living in a box", while in the Outback, he is the powerful protector of the Leopard Queen, who exists in the real world as Julie Winters, a freelance social worker who often bails Maxx out of jail. While Maxx is aware of the Outback, Julie is not, though it is integral to both of their stories.

== Plot summary ==
=== Main story arc ===
Mr. Gone, a serial rapist with a telepathic link to Julie, has extensive knowledge of and access to other people's Outbacks. He starts phoning Julie, but she thinks he is merely an obscene phone caller and ignores him. Eventually, the Maxx gets in Gone's way by "protecting" Julie. Gone tries to kill him with assistance from the Outback's main predators, the Isz. The Maxx fights him in both the Outback and the real world.

Eventually, Mr. Gone makes Julie see the truth about her past and reveals to her how the Maxx came to be. Gone first met Julie when she was a child as "Uncle Artie", a friend of her father; his tall tales about a visit to Australia helped shape Julie's Outback. As Julie begins healing herself and the Outback, the series starts following Sara, a depressed teenager whose mother sends her to Julie for counseling. Sara is often in conflict with her mother, who disciplines her so she will not grow up to be like her father—Mr. Gone.

=== Backstory ===
The backstories of several characters are revealed midway through the series. While in college, Julie picks up a hitch-hiker who beats and rapes her, leaving her to die. To cope, she hides in what is referred to as her "Outback" (a primeval landscape situated entirely in her subconscious, where she has control). In the Outback, she becomes "The Jungle Queen", an all-powerful goddess. She spends so much time dwelling in her Outback that the real world and the Outback gradually become unstable.

One night, she accidentally hits a homeless man with her car. Remembering what happened the last time she stopped to help someone, she covers the unconscious body with trash, but in doing so unintentionally creates a link between it and the Outback. After Julie leaves a lampshade in the trash, which had previously brushed the Outback, it expands over the man's body and becomes a mask that consumes and links him to Julie, transforming him into the Maxx.

=== Second storyline ===
After the conclusion of the first storyline, the comic skips in time from 1995 (the then-present) to the year 2005. Julie and Dave (the former Maxx) having vanished, the action focuses on Sara (as she now spells her name) and "Iago", a giant, murderous banana slug from her Outback. Iago has a list of people to kill, and it turns out that Julie and Sara are both on it. Sara is hounded by a homeless man named Norbert whom she soon realizes is her Maxx. Sara has constant confrontations with Mr. Gone, who is repentant of his past crimes. He is visited by three special agents intent on arresting him, but he turns them into insects. Later, after reading a diary he leaves for her that reveals his tragic origin story, Sara eventually feels sympathy for and a connection to her father. She also begins developing a strange power that she may be inheriting from Gone.

Julie and Dave return to the story after Julie is attacked by Iago and loses a few fingers. It turns out that Julie abandoned her son, Mark, to keep him safe from Iago. She tries to have Dave tell Mark that she's dead so he'll stop seeking her out, but Mark does not believe him. Sara, Dave, Mark, Mr. Gone and Norbert band together to rescue Julie from Iago, who kidnaps and takes her into Sara's outback. Norbert cuts Iago open, apparently defeating him, but Julie has already escaped.

Mr. Gone soon reveals that time is unraveling for the group, which now includes Glorie, one of Gone's past victims who now has a friendly relationship with him. Gone returns Dave's Maxx power to him. Sara returns as a being whom different people perceive as a giant Isz, pink fairy, or football. Mark has an odd dream about eccentric kidnappers. Each member of the group begins to disappear from reality to be reborn in another. Before Gone can disappear, the three agents who previously tried to arrest him, now appearing as humanoid beings with insect bug heads, return and kill him, as he expected. Mark is the last to disappear.

In Julie's outback, Gone is reunited with Sara, who is now a child again. The Maxx considers attacking him, but the Jungle Queen says to leave him be, because even evil deserves a place to rest.

In the new reality, Mr. Gone is a professor and Dave is a janitor at his school. Julie and Mark are still mother and son, but seem to live in better conditions. All the principal characters now lead completely distinct lives, yet retain a small part of their connection to the Outback and to each other.

== Spirit animals ==
One of the dominant concepts of The Maxx is that every human being has a spirit animal, which is linked to the person during a pivotal moment in their life. Julie's spirit animal is a rabbit, which she gained after rescuing a dying rabbit as a child. Julie later witnessed her mother bludgeoning the rabbit to death with a shovel to put it out of its misery, which linked the rabbit to Julie's subconscious.

Sarah's spirit animal is a horse. In the latter half of the series, this spirit animal manifests itself as Norbert, a homeless man she takes pity on.

== Isz ==
The main inhabitants of the Outback, the Isz are small, eyeless beings with egg-shaped bodies. The white Isz of the Outback become cannibalistic black Isz when brought into the real world. In one instance, a White Isz was able to cross over into the real world unchanged through a small hole in an alley wall that connected both realities. The Isz in Sara's Outback are pink, flying, eyeless fairies that explode if not kept in water.

== Collected editions ==
The original comic series was collected into five trade paperbacks:

- The Maxx Book 1: Issues #1–6, ISBN 1-4012-0124-5 (September 2003)
- The Maxx Book 2: Issues #7–13, Darker Image #1 ISBN 1-4012-0280-2
- The Maxx Book 3: Issues #14–20 ISBN 1-4012-0298-5
- The Maxx Book 4: Issues #21–27 ISBN 1-4012-0613-1
- The Maxx Book 5: Issues #28–35 ISBN 1-4012-0621-2

The spin-off series Friends of Maxx #1–3 (April 1996–March 1997) was collected as:

- The Maxx Book 6 ISBN 1-4012-0946-7 (February 2006)

The IDW reissues of the comics have also been collected into hardcover collections:

- The Maxx Maxximized Volume 1: Issues #1–4, ISBN 978-1613779590 (July 2014)
- The Maxx Maxximized Volume 2: Issues #5–8, ISBN 978-1631401046
- The Maxx Maxximized Volume 3: Issues #9–12, ISBN 978-1631402029
- The Maxx Maxximized Volume 4: Issues #13–18, ISBN 978-1631403231
- The Maxx Maxximized Volume 5: Issues #19–24, ISBN 978-1631405136
- The Maxx Maxximized Volume 6: Issues #25–30, ISBN 1631406612
- The Maxx Maxximized Volume 7: Issues #31–35, ISBN 1631408003 (December 2016)

IDW collected the reissues into trade paperbacks:

- The Maxx: Maxxed Out Volume 1: Issues #1–12, 978-1-63140-555-6 (March 2016)
- The Maxx: Maxxed Out Volume 2: Issues #13–24, 978-1-63140-705-5
- The Maxx: Maxxed Out Volume 3: Issues #25–35, 978-1-63140-880-9 (May 2017)

=== Other issues ===
An earlier version of Maxx, still called Max the Hare, made his first appearance in Comico Primer #5 (1983). Other Maxx issues include his modern version comic book debut, in an 8-page spread in the first and only issue of Darker Image (March 1993), an incomplete anthology series from Image Comics, as well as The Maxx #½ (June 1993) and a Gen^{13}/The Maxx crossover (December 1995). Recently, IDW published another crossover series of five issues, Batman/The Maxx (October 2018–February 2019).

- Batman/The Maxx: The Lost Year Compendium: Issues #1–3 (Kindle Edition) (September 2020)
- Batman/The Maxx: Arkham Dreams: Issues #1–5, ISBN 978-1684054329 (2021)

== Cameos ==
The Maxx has made cameo appearances in the graphic novel Popbot Book 2 (which Kieth co-wrote), issue #1 of the independent comic Armature, the Sonic the Hedgehog comic Sonic Super Special #7 Sonic/Image Crossover, the three issue limited series Altered Image, Bloodwulf #2, The Savage Dragon #28 (collected in Savage Dragon Vol. 7: A Talk With God), and Troll Halloween Special #1. He also briefly appears in the series Mars Attacks Image. He appears on a TV screen on the Frostbite version of the cover to DV8 #1. Maxx stories have also appeared in Gay Comics #24 and IDW Publishing's Hero Comics 2014. In 2018, Maxx made a long-awaited comeback with Batman in the Arkham Dreams series.

== Television series ==
The Maxx
- The Maxx: The Complete Series DVD set
- Created by: Sam Kieth; Bill Messner-Loebs
- Based on: The Maxx by Sam Kieth
- Directed by: Gregg Vanzo
- Voices of: Michael Haley; Glynnis Talken; Amy Danles; Barry Stigler
- Country of origin: United States
- No. of episodes: 13

Production
- Executive producer: Abby Terkuhle
- Producer: Claudia Katz
- Running time: 11–13 minutes
- Production companies: MTV Animation; Rough Draft Studios

Original release
- Network: MTV
- Release: April 8 – June 19, 1995

The comic book series was adapted into an animated series as part of the MTV program Oddities. The show covered Darker Image #1, The Maxx #1/2 and issues #1–11 of the regular series, and depicted the introduction of Julie, Maxx, Mr. Gone and, later on in the series, Sarah. The TV show did not go into the same depth (e.g. revealing the origins of all the characters) as the comic series.

The animation frequently changes style: in one scene, characters may be rendered in detail, but in the next, they may be simplified cartoons. Often, this is done to show a change in perspective. CGI and even live-action film are sometimes integrated or interspersed with the hand-drawn animation. Critics such as Richard Matthes have noted how much of the animation is based directly on panels from the comic.

=== Home media ===
In 1996, the complete series was released on VHS with a runtime of approximately 2 hours. In 2009, it became available to stream on MTV.com, though only to U.S. audiences. On December 17, 2009, The Maxx became available on DVD exclusively through Amazon's CreateSpace "Manufacture-on-Demand" program; it contains every episode of the TV show and also includes audio commentary on each episode, plus interviews with creator Sam Kieth and director Gregg Vanzo.

=== Episodes ===
No. overall	No. in season	Title	Original release date
1	1	"Episode #1"	April 8, 1995
The hulking superhero Maxx attempts to save a woman from thugs. But the police arrive and the Maxx is carted off to jail while the woman becomes the prey occult serial killer Mr. Gone. Social worker Julie Winters then bails out the Maxx.
2	2	"Episode #2"	April 8, 1995
The Maxx begins living with Julie and tells her that he is her protector in another world called the "Outback". After killing another girl, Mr. Gone tries to get to Julie, but in doing so, he encounters The Maxx.
3	3	"Episode #3"	April 17, 1995
In a direct fight, Mr. Gone is defeated by The Maxx, but the serial killer then sends his henchmen, the Isz, after The Maxx, who overwhelm him. Gone continues to kidnap Julie. But she knows how to defend herself.
4	4	"Episode #4"	April 17, 1995
When The Maxx chases another Isz, the two worlds collide. The Maxx then meets Mr. Gone who reveals that he knows the truth about him. The Maxx questions Gone's revelations over a pedicure with Julie, who was raped and left for dead.
5	5	"Episode #5"	April 24, 1995
Young Sarah is disappointed with life. Since her father killed himself, she has been an outsider. She eventually confesses to Julie that she is carrying her father's gun, and considers shooting her friend for revenge.
6	6	"Episode #6"	April 24, 1995
Sarah meets up with Julie and Maxx. The three of them get car-jacked by a group of Isz masquerading as punks. Maxx prevails, but when Sarah sees one of dying punks become an Isz, it's too much. With gun in hand, she threatens suicide.
7	7	"Episode #7"	May 1, 1995
Maxx falls asleep and dreams that he is in an episode of his favorite cartoon, "The Crappon In a Hat". In the dream, Maxx is chased by his fears of knowing the truth of his identity. Julie also explores deep into her own "Outback".
8	8	"Episode #8"	May 1, 1995
The humanoid shark villain Hammerhead is sent after The Maxx. They have a battle across the city. While Julie and Sarah's mom have a conversation about violence in cartoons, Mr. Gone returns from inside Julie's head.
9	9	"Episode #9"	May 8, 1995
Maxx finally takes Julie to the Outback, but the scale is different. Meanwhile, Sarah finds a piece of talking clay at school called "Mr. Clay". With a strangely familiar voice, Mr. Clay wants Sarah to take him to Julie's apartment.
10	10	"Episode #10"	May 8, 1995
Sarah finds her spirit animal. The Maxx tries to get to Julie, but in the process, his mask falls off. Mr. Gone explains to Julie that the barriers between the two worlds are damaged. They then discover the truth about Mr. Clay.
11	11	"Episode #11"	June 19, 1995
Mr. Gone uses a captured doctor to replace his head. Meanwhile, The Maxx tells a bunch of kids the story of where he got his claws. While sitting on the toilet, Julie continues to question her relationship with The Maxx.
12	12	"Episode #12"	June 19, 1995
Mr. Gone tells the story of when Julie was a little girl, she found a bunny that's been hit by a car. The way her parents dealt with it scarred Julie deeply. During that time, she learned how to deal with problems.
13	13	"Episode #13"	June 19, 1995
Julie tries to help The Maxx understand that she has to go. The Maxx finds Mr. Gone's head who then tries to explain the truth to him. Julie has one final talk with The Maxx and then closes the door behind her and to him for good.

=== Voice actors ===
- Michael Haley as The Maxx
- Glynnis Talken as Julie Winters and Glorie
- Amy Danles as Sarah
- Barry Stigler as Mr. Gone

== Other media ==
=== Role-playing game ===
An adventure for the Heroes & Heroines role-playing game was released using The Maxx characters and setting.

=== Soundtrack ===
An audio drama comic adaptation, MAXXimum Sound: A Comic Book Soundtrack, was made from the first three issues of the comic book and released on audio cassette in 1993. It was created by Stephen Romano and managed by Smiles Lewis.

=== Video game ===
In 2008, Chris "AlterWerld" Vick made an Atari Jaguar (1993 console) video game demo based on the Maxx for the JagCode II contest. Being the winner of the contest, it is available on the JagCode II website.

=== Film ===
On November 22, 2019, Channing Tatum and Roy Lee announced their intent to produce a film based on The Maxx. In January 2024, Tatum confirmed on his Instagram that production on the film was moving forward.
