= Decompression (comics) =

Stylistic storytelling choice

An example of decompression from Astonishing X-Men #14. An entire page is dedicated to Wolverine complimenting Shadowcat and Colossus for advancing in their relationship; art by John Cassaday.

In comics, decompression is a storytelling style characterized by a strong emphasis on visuals or character interaction, which, in turn, usually leads to slower-moving plots.

The style is often used with widescreen comics.

== History ==
Decompression became prevalent in mainstream American comic books in the 1990s and 2000s. Until that time, American comics were often published as anthologies featuring multiple short stories in each issue, which continued for decades in the backup story pages. The done-in-one format prevailed until it was superseded by multiple open-ended subplots that characterized the storytelling style of the 1970s and 1980s.

Decompression is often claimed to be a result of the influence of manga on the international comics scene. Manga — which is typically less expensive per page than American comics due to both higher circulation and black-and-white printing — often uses decompression as a storytelling style. Influenced by film storyboarding, this style was first popularized in manga by cartoonist Osamu Tezuka with his 1947 manga Shin Takarajima (New Treasure Island). Tezuka's more "cinematic style" was so successful that it caught on with other cartoonists in Japan and eventually spread throughout the world with works such as Katsuhiro Otomo's epic Akira which was one of the first manga to become popular within the American comic book community.

One of the first commercially successful American comics to use decompression as its dominant style was the first twelve issues of The Authority by Warren Ellis and Bryan Hitch. In the wake of that book's success, decompression was widely adopted across the American comics industry with varying degrees of success. Since then, many alternative American cartoonists have made use of decompression, especially those who were directly influenced by manga, such as Bryan Lee O'Malley.

Some French comic books use decompression as well, most notably artists associated with the Franco-Japanese La nouvelle manga movement such as Frédéric Boilet (Yukiko's Spinach) and Vanyada (The Building Opposite).

== Criticism ==
Decompressed storytelling has been controversial in American comics fandom. Detractors accuse writers of unnecessarily extending the page count of plots, thinning out content per page in order to increase sales for a limited amount of labor. Defenders claim that decompressed stories are not unnecessarily extended, but rich in character development and mood rather than in plot progression. Some see the phenomenon as driven by the increasing popularity of trade paperbacks, which typically collect an average of six comic book issues in a volume and thus provide a target length for stories to fit.

== Compression ==
In response to criticism of the widespread use of decompression in mainstream American comics, writers Warren Ellis, Dan Slott, and Brian Wood have each experimented with compressed storytelling. Ellis' series Fell, Global Frequency, and Planetary each adhere to the format of single issue stories, and Nextwave is told only in two issue arcs. Slott's stories in She-Hulk and Thing also maintain only one, two, or three issue story arcs, and his contribution to the 2005 edition of Amazing Fantasy #15 uses what he referred to as "hypercompressed" storytelling: 6 writers were given 8 pages each to premiere a new character, and Slott elected to tell four stories with his character, each one a mere two pages. Brian Wood's indie series Demo and Local are all single-issue comics, in some cases with no recurring characters from one issue to the next, creating a true self-contained short story experience.
