= Angeltown (comics) =

- Cover for Angeltown #1 (January 2005), art by Shawn Martinbrough.

Publication information
- Publisher: Vertigo Comics
- Schedule: Monthly
- Format: Limited series
- Genre: Crime
- Publication date: January – May 2005
- No. of issues: 5
- Main character(s): Nate Hollis

Creative team
- Created by: Gary Phillips; Shawn Martinbrough
- Written by: Gary Phillips
- Artist(s): Shawn Martinbrough
- Letterer(s): Jared K. Fletcher
- Colorist(s): Lee Loughridge
- Editor(s): Will Dennis; Casey Seijas (assistant)

Angeltown is a 5-issue comic book limited series created in 2005 by writer Gary Phillips and artist Shawn Martinbrough, and published by Vertigo Comics, an imprint of DC Comics. The story is told in the blaxploitation idiom, with nods to the detective stories of Chester Himes and Walter Mosley.

In 2011, the series was reprinted by Moonstone Books as Angeltown: The Nate Hollis Investigations, which included two new illustrated short stories by Phillips.

== Plot ==
Allison Dillon, the white wife of African-American basketball star Theophus Burnett, is discovered murdered in her home. After the acrimonious end of their marriage, Dillon had written a scabrous tell-all celebrity memoir, and Burnett is considered the primary suspect, but has disappeared. He is sought not only by the police but by private detective Nate Hollis. The more Hollis digs, the more dirt on Burnett he finds, including a sex tape featuring Burnett with Monica Orozco, Burnett's lawyer and an ex-lover of Hollis', and soft-core porn starlet and z-list actress "Toasty", the daughter of local crime lord Paul Teddy.

Hollis comes to believe that Burnett is innocent, but cannot prove it without information from Burnett himself. Hollis eventually locates Burnett in a beach house in Malibu, where Paul Teddy's gangsters make an attempt on his life, which he survives. With the aid of his grandfather, "Clutch", Hollis deduces the identity of the real killer.
