= Four Women (comics) =

American comic series by Sam Keith

- Cover of Four Women #1, October 2001.

Publication information
- Publisher: Homage Comics (DC Comics)
- Format: Limited series
- Publication date: December 2001 - April 2002
- No. of issues: 5

Creative team
- Written by: Sam Kieth
- Artist: Sam Kieth
- Inker: Jim Sinclair
- Colorist: Alex Sinclair

Four Women is an American five-part limited series published by Homage Comics. Written and drawn by Sam Kieth, it deals with four female friends of varying ages—Donna, Bev, Marion and Cindy—and a road trip during which they are attacked and sexually assaulted by two men. The story mostly takes place in a flashback as Donna recounts the story to her psychiatrist.

== Plot ==
Bev, Donna, Marion and Cindy set out to their friends' wedding in a car. Throughout the book, Donna is restrictive about the details of the encounter when describing it to her psychiatrist. She eventually reveals that Bev was the driver. The vehicle experiences trouble and stalls on a downward sloping road. Two men stop by and instead of getting help, crush the car driving over it then cover the car with a gigantic tarp as a prelude to a sexual assault. Cindy get pinned trying to get out the rear window, her pants pulled down by one of the men with a knife. Marion, who takes a chance to save Cindy gets out of the car, and is attacked and raped. According to Donna, Bev locks the doors and won't let Marion back in, or let anyone out to help. However, a fight ensues and the two men are slain.

The psychiatrist feels that Donna isn't telling the whole story and presses Donna to reveal more. It is then revealed that Donna was the one driving and that she was the one who refused to unlock the doors to save Marion.
