= Bloodwulf =

Comic book character and title by Rob Liefeld

Cover of Bloodwulf #1 (1995)

Bloodwulf was an American superhero comics title and character created by Rob Liefeld. The character first appeared in the one-shot Darker Image in March 1993, published by Image Comics. The character later appeared in a Bloodwulf mini-series from 1995 in four issues, illustrated by Dærick Gröss Sr. He also appeared in a one-shot from 1995 entitled "Bloodwulf Summer Special" where he was pitted against Supreme.

== Fictional character biography ==
Bloodwulf is an alien bounty hunter from the planet Luap'ur where he lives with his multiple wives and brood of children. He craves a life of action, however, and is always ready and willing to leave his quiet, domestic life behind for grand space adventures. His mother, Redwulf, and grandmother, Califia, are also formidable star farers. Bloodwulf's powers include enhanced strength and a personal force field which allows him to breathe in the vacuum of space.
