= John Paul Leon =

American comic book artist (1972–2021)

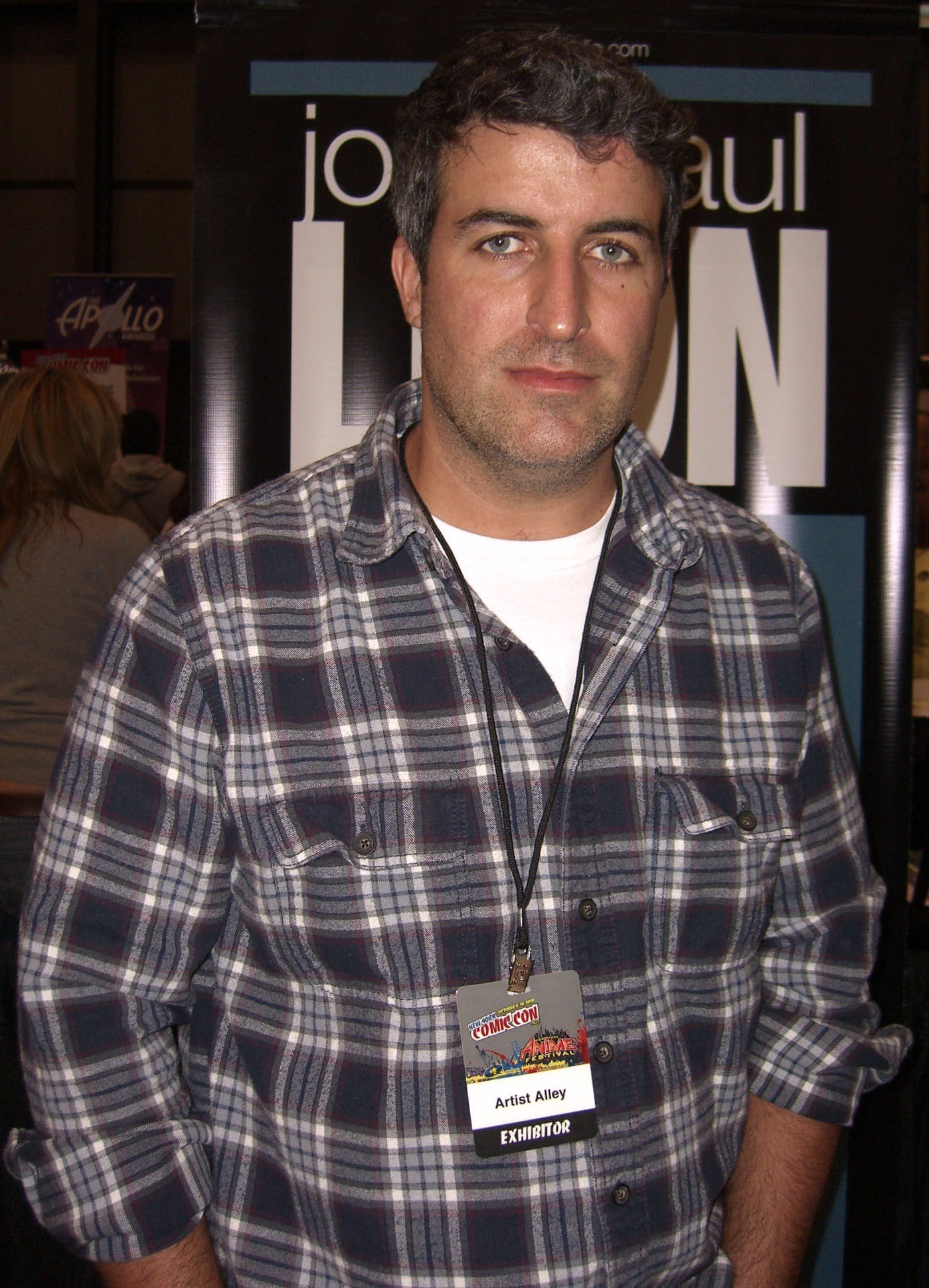
- Leon at the New York Comic Con in Manhattan on October 9, 2010
- Born: April 26, 1972 New York City, New York, US
- Died: May 2, 2021 (aged 49)
- Area: Artist
- Notable works: Earth X Static; The Winter Men

John Paul Leon (April 26, 1972 – May 2, 2021) was an American comic book artist, known for his work on the Milestone Comics series Static, and the Marvel Comics limited series Earth X.

Leon also provided artwork for a number of style guides for feature film adaptations of comic books, including Superman Returns, Batman Begins, Green Lantern, and The Dark Knight.

== Early life ==
John Paul Leon was born on April 26, 1972, in New York City. He grew up in Miami, Florida, where he would attend the New World School of the Arts.

== Career ==
Leon first began working professionally at the age of 16, with a series of black and white illustrations for TSR's Dragon and Dungeon magazines.

He majored in illustration at New York's School of Visual Arts, studying under artists such as Will Eisner, Walter Simonson, and Jack Potter. It was during this time that he received his first professional comics job, illustrating the Dark Horse Comics miniseries RoboCop: Prime Suspect (October 1992). By his junior year he was given the job as the inaugural artist on the DC Comics/Milestone ongoing series Static (June 1993), his first breakout work, which Simonson agreed would serve as Leon's course work for that semester. He would draw Static until its ninth issue (February 1994). Leon graduated from SVA with a Bachelor of Fine Arts in 1994. Regarding this milestone, Leon would relate to Newsarama in 2019:

"When I graduated SVA, I remember they had us fill out a form, for what purpose, I don't recall. But among the questions asked was something along the lines of, where do you see yourself in 20 years, or what are your goals for the next several years. I remember my answer was, '...To build a body of work and to be highly regarded among my peers.' Something like that."

As Leon's popularity rose, he became a sought-after artist for both DC and Marvel, projects. He drew the miniseries Logan: Path of the Warlord and The Further Adventures of Cyclops and Phoenix (both in 1996), and the 12-issue miniseries Earth X (1999), written by Jim Krueger and Alex Ross, another signature work of Leon's that depicted a dystopian future of the Marvel Universe, and which spawned multiple sequels. Leon also contributed to regular ongoing series such as multiple Batman-related books, Superman, and Challengers of the Unknown (1997).

By the early 2000s, Leon's work caught the notice of DC Comics' parent company Warner Bros., through which Leon would provid artwork for a number of style guides for the studio's feature film adaptations of DC properties, including Superman Returns, Batman Begins, Green Lantern, and The Dark Knight.

Leon also illustrated Superman Returns: Be a Hero, a children's book published by Meredith Books as a tie-in to the 2006 feature film Superman Returns.

Leon's other career-defining works of the 2000s included two issues of New X-Men in 2002, and two DC Comics miniseries: The Winter Men, which was written by Leon's SVA classmate Brett Lewis and published under DC's Wildstorm imprint, and the DC miniseries Batman: Creature of the Night, a four-issue miniseries written by Kurt Busiek that, due to Leon's third diagnosis of stage two colorectal cancer, was published over the course of four years, with the final issue being released in 2019.

In April 2021, Leon was announced as the artist on the upcoming Batman/Catwoman Special #1, a retelling of the origin of Catwoman, written by Tom King.

Leon's last interior artwork was the "memory sequence" in the first issue of Jupiter's Legacy: Requiem (June 2021), which writer Mark Millar dedicated to Leon's memory.

== Personal life and death ==
In 2008, Leon was diagnosed with colorectal cancer, for which he would be treated several times, with a combination of chemotherapy, radiation, and surgery. By 2012 he was in remission. In January 2018, he was diagnosed with the disease a third time, which had again spread to his lungs. He underwent chemotherapy again in January 2019, and indicated in an interview that November that he was responding well to the treatment, and was exhibiting promising energy levels. Though he continued to work throughout this process, it hindered the timely release of the book Batman: Creature of the Night.

As of 2018, Leon lived with his wife and daughter in Miami, Florida.

John Paul Leon died May 2, 2021, at age 49, after a 14-year battle with cancer. He was survived by his wife, daughter, and older brother. Leon's colleague, Tommy Lee Edwards, set up a GoFundMe page to create a trust fund for the education of Leon's then-17-year-old daughter, and help fund her education in engineering.

Marvel Comics and DC Comics ran tributes to Leon in books they published in the first week of June 2021. Marvel's featured a eulogy by Marvel Entertainment EVP Creative Director Joe Quesada, who stated, "John Paul Leon was truly a unique talent, admired and envied by all of us in the industry for his ability to convey the complexities of the world with a distilled simplicity of line and mastery of the craft that few can ever hope to achieve. He's passed much too soon, leaving us to wonder what further heights he would have achieved, but thankful for the work he's left behind that will inspire generations of artists to come. Our hearts at Marvel go out to his family, loved ones, friends, and fans. Godspeed." In DC's books, Publisher and Chief Creative Officer Jim Lee wrote, "One of the greatest artists of our generation, he was also one of the nicest and most talented creators one could be lucky enough to have met." On its website, DC also published tributes by Leon's collaborator Tom King, and DC vice president and editor-in-chief Marie Javins.

== Bibliography ==
- RoboCop (with John Arcudi, in Dark Horse Comics #1–3, Dark Horse Comics, 1992)
- RoboCop: Prime Suspect (pencils, with writer John Arcudi and inks by Jeff Albrecht, Dark Horse Comics, 1992–1993)
- Static #1–9 (pencils, with writers Michael Davis, Robert Washington III and Dwayne McDuffie, and inks by Steve Mitchell, Milestone Comics, 1993–1994)
- Shadow Cabinet #0–17 (1994–95)
- World's Collide One-Shot (1994)
- Icon #20 (1994)
- Superman: The Man of Steel Annual #1 (1995)
- Shadow of the Bat #40–41 (1995)
- X-Men Annual 1995 (1995)
- Logan: Path of the Warlord (1996)
- The Further Adventures of Cyclops and Phoenix (pencils, with writer Peter Milligan and inks by Klaus Janson, 4-issue mini-series, Marvel, 1996, tpb, 96 pages, October 1997, ISBN 0-7851-0556-5)
- Challengers of the Unknown #1–12, 16 (1997–98)
- Moon Knight Vol. 3 #4 (1998)
- Daredevil #375 (1998)
- The Creeper #9 (1998)
- Grendel: Devil's Toll (1998)
- Earth X #0–12 (with writers Alex Ross and Jim Krueger and inks by Bill Reinhold, Marvel Comics, 1999–00)
- Gotham Knights #6 (Batman Black & White backup feature, 2000)
- Static Shock: Rebirth of the Cool #1–4 (2000)
- Smallville: The Comic (2002)
- New X-Men #127, 131 (2002)
- Weapon X #4 (2003)
- Tom Strong #25 (2004)
- Captain America Vol. 5 #7 (2005)
- The Winter Men (with Brett Lewis, 6-issue limited series, Wildstorm, 2005–06, 2008, ISBN 1-4012-2526-8)
- Hellblazer #229 (2007)
- Midnighter #8 (2007)
- Ex Machina Specials #3–4 (2007–09)
- DC: Infinite Halloween Special (2007)
- Scalped (2008)
- Sgt. Fury and His Howling Commandos Vol. 2 #1 (2009)
- Dark Reign: Made Men One-Shot (2009)
- Black Widow: Deadly Origin #1–4 (2009)
- DMZ #50 (2010)
- Milestone Forever #1–2 (2010)
- Static Shock Special (2011)
- The Spirit Vol. 2 #16 (2011)
- Animal Man Vol. 2 #6, 20 (2012–13)
- American Vampire Anthology #1 (2013)
- Batman Incorporated Special (2013)
- Detective Comics Vol. 2 #35–36 (2014)
- Mother Panic #7–9 (2017)
- Batman: Creature of the Night (with Kurt Busiek, 4-issue limited series, 2017–2019)
- DC: Beach Blanket Bad Guys Special (2018)
- DC: Crimes of Passion Special (2020)
- Catwoman Vol. 5 #25 (2020)
- Let Them Live: Unpublished Tales from the DC Vault #3 (2021)
- Batman/Catwoman Special #1 (2021) (posthumous)
