= Widescreen comics =

Format of comic books

Widescreen comics is a movement within the field of comic books named both for its very cinematic decompression style and its tendency to use panels of greater width relative to their height, mimicking the aspect ratio of widescreen cinematic presentation.
