= Three Rooms Press =

Small press in New York City (e. 1993)

Three Rooms Press is a New York City-based small press. It was founded in 1993 by Kat Georges and Peter Carlaftes with a focus on poetry, but the press now publishes mainly fiction, memoir, and art. Three Rooms Press's name was inspired by one of the themes in Harold Pinter's play The Homecoming. The press also manages an annual international dada art and poetry journal called Maintenant, which was featured by the Brussels Poetry Fest in 2016 and 2017. Issues of Maintenant have been featured and sold in museums such as the Museum of Modern Art in New York City and the BelVUE Museum in Brussels. Three Rooms Press books are distributed by PGW / Ingram.

== Associated authors ==
Three Rooms Press authors include: William S. Burroughs, Robert Silverberg, Johanna Drucker, Julia Watts, William Least Heat-Moon and Meagan Brothers, among others.

== Awards ==
Several of Three Rooms Press' books have won awards. The Obama Inheritance, edited by Gary Philips, won the 2018 Anthony Award for Best Anthology, and also earned the Bronze Medal for the Foreword Reviews Indie Book Award for Anthologies. Atrium, a poetry collection by Hala Alyan, won the Arab American Book Award for poetry in 2013. Weird Girl and What's His Name, a young adult novel by Meagan Brothers, was named IndieFab's Young Adult Book of the Year in 2015, and was named one of the best teen books of 2015 by Kirkus Reviews.
