= Sam Kieth =

American comics artist and writer (1963–2026)

- Born: January 11, 1963 Sacramento, California, U.S.
- Died: March 15, 2026 (aged 63) Sacramento, California, U.S.
- Areas: Writer, Penciller, Artist, Inker
- Notable works: The Maxx; Zero Girl
- Awards: Inkpot Award (2013)
- Relatives: David Feiss (cousin)

Sam Kieth (January 11, 1963 – March 15, 2026) was an American comics artist and writer, best known as the creator of The Maxx and Zero Girl and co-creator of The Sandman.

== Personal life ==
Kieth was born in Sacramento, California, on January 11, 1963, the only child of Samuel E. and Sammie (née Robertson) Kieth. In 1982, he married Kathy Frye. He died at his home in Sacramento of complications from Lewy body dementia on March 15, 2026, at the age of 63.

== Career ==
=== Comics ===
Kieth's first published work was "a story in the back of a Comico comic" when he was "about seventeen"; it was "about a killer rabbit named Max the Hare". He came to prominence in 1984 as the inker of Matt Wagner's Mage, and a year later as the inker of Fish Police. In 1989, he penciled the first five issues (the "Preludes & Nocturnes" story arc) of writer Neil Gaiman's celebrated series The Sandman and collaborated with Alan Grant on a Penguin story in Secret Origins Special #1 (1989). He illustrated two volumes of writer William Messner-Loebs' Epicurus the Sage, drew an Aliens miniseries for Dark Horse Comics, and drew The Incredible Hulk vol. 2 #368, which led to drawing numerous covers for Marvel Comics Presents.

In 1993, Kieth left Marvel to create the original series The Maxx for fledgling publisher Image Comics. The Maxx ran 35 issues, all of which were plotted and illustrated by Kieth. William Messner-Loebs scripted #1–15 and Alan Moore wrote #21. In 1995, The Maxx was adapted as part of MTV's short-lived animation series MTV's Oddities.

After taking a break from comics to pursue other interests, Kieth came back with the one-shot “Legs” for Image Comics, then created the series Zero Girl for DC Comics' Wildstorm imprint in 2001. He followed that with the drama Four Women later that year, a Hulk/Wolverine mini-series for Marvel in 2002, and Zero Girl: Full Circle in 2003. In August 2004, he launched the Scratch series featuring a teenage werewolf.

Kieth then wrote and drew the five-issue series Batman: Secrets, featuring the Joker, and Batman/Lobo: Deadly Serious, a two-issue miniseries starting in August 2007. This was followed by 2009's Lobo: Highway to Hell, written by Scott Ian of the band Anthrax, and the painted story "Ghosts", which appeared in Batman Confidential #40–43. In 2010, Kieth wrote and illustrated the original hardcover graphic novel Arkham Asylum: Madness, which spent two weeks on The New York Times Best Seller list, reaching number five in the category of "Hardcover Graphic Books".

Ojo comprises the first, and My Inner Bimbo the second, in a cycle of original limited series or graphic novels published by Oni Press, which he dubbed "The Trout-a-Verse". The cycle concerned the intertwined lives of Annie (Ojo), Lo (My Inner Bimbo), Dana, Nola, Otto, and others all connected by an encounter with an urban legend known as the Magic Trout.

In the UK, he has contributed to 2000 AD's Judge Dredd and provided several covers for the Nemesis the Warlock reprint title. In 2011, Kieth began drawing IDW Publishing's 30 Days of Night series. IDW released the 48-page The Sam Kieth Sketchbooks: Vol. 1, followed by a second volume in August 2010.

=== Other media ===
In addition to co-producing The Maxx animated series for MTV, Kieth co-wrote "No Smoking", the pilot to Cow and Chicken (created by his cousin, David Feiss), and directed the film Take It to the Limit (2000) for Roger Corman's Concorde-New Horizons.

== Awards ==
Kieth received an Inkpot Award at San Diego Comic-Con in 2013.

== Bibliography ==
=== AfterShock Comics ===
- Eleanor & the Egret (2017)

=== Comico Comics ===
- Primer #5 (writer/artist) (first published art) (1983)
- Justice Machine #11 (inker) (1987)
- Mage #6–15 (inker) (1985–1986)

=== Dark Horse Comics ===
- Aliens: Earth War #1–4 (1990)

=== DC Comics ===
- Arkham Asylum: Madness HC (writer/artist) (2010)
- Batman Confidential #40–43 (writer/artist) (2010)
- Batman/Lobo: Deadly Serious #1–2 (writer/artist) (2007)
- Batman: Secrets #1–5 (writer/artist) (2006)
- Batman/The Maxx: Arkham Dreams #1–5 (2018–2020)
- Batman: Through the Looking Glass HC (2012)
- Harley Quinn vol. 2 #0 (2014)
- House of Mystery vol. 2 #23 (2010)
- Infinity, Inc. #49 (inker) (1988)
- Lobo: Highway to Hell #1–2 (2010)
- Manhunter #1–3, 12 (inker) (1988–1989)
- The Sandman vol. 2 #1–5 (1989)
- Scratch #1–5 (writer/artist) (2004)
- Secret Origins Special #1 (1989)
- T.H.U.N.D.E.R. Agents vol. 2 #4 (2012)

==== Piranha Press ====
- Epicurus the Sage #1–2 (1989–1991)
- Fast Forward #3 (1993)

==== WildStorm ====
- Epicurus the Sage TPB (2003)
- Four Women #1–5 (writer/artist) (2001–2002)
- Zero Girl #1–5 (writer/artist) (2001)
- Zero Girl: Full Circle #1–5 (writer/artist) (2003)

=== Eclipse Comics ===
- Adolescent Radioactive Black Belt Hamsters #6–8 (1987)

=== Fantagraphics Books ===
- Critters #7, 11–12, 23 (writer/artist) (1986–1987), #21 (cover art) (1988)

=== Fishwrap Productions ===
- Fish Police #1 (inker and pin-up) (1985)

=== Image Comics ===
- Darker Image #1 (plotter/artist) (1993)
- Friends of Maxx #1–3 (1996–1997)
- The Maxx #1–35 (plotter/artist) (1993–1998)
- Sam Stories: Legs (writer/artist) (1999)

=== Marvel Comics ===
- Clive Barker's Hellraiser #12 (1992)
- Freddy Krueger's A Nightmare On Elm Street #2 (back cover pin-up) (1989)
- The Incredible Hulk vol. 2 #368 (artist) (1990)
- Marvel Age #105 (cover art and interview with reprinted art) (1991)
- Marvel Comics Presents #85–92, 100, 117–122 (cover and art); #94–99 and 101–111 (cover only) (1991–1993)
- Peter Parker: Spider-Man vol. 2 #56–57 (2003)
- The Savage Hulk #1 (1996)
- Wolverine/Hulk #1–4 (writer/artist) (2002)
- X-Men Unlimited vol. 2 #9 (2005)

=== Oni Press ===
- Ojo #1–5 (2004–2005)
- My Inner Bimbo #1–5 (2006–2008)

Preceded by n/a	The Sandman penciller 1989	Succeeded by Mike Dringenberg
