= The Winter Men =

Publication information
- Publisher: Wildstorm
- Schedule: Irregular
- Format: Limited series
- Genre: Superhero
- Publication date: September 2005 – December 2008
- No. of issues: 5+1

Creative team
- Created by: Brett Lewis; John Paul Leon
- Written by: Brett Lewis
- Artist: John Paul Leon
- Colorist: Dave Stewart

Collected editions
- The Winter Men: ISBN 1-4012-2526-8

The Winter Men is an American comic book limited series published by Wildstorm Productions in 2005. The series was written by Brett Lewis, with art by John Paul Leon.

The story is about a Russian policeman who is the product of a Soviet project to create superhumans.

== Publication history ==
Lewis and Leon met as students at New York's School of Visual Arts, where Lewis, himself an artist at the time, studied under Walter Simonson and planned to draw an iteration of the comic himself. In a 2006 interview, Leon stated,

Brett Lewis and I first began developing this project about five years ago. Actually it really began years before then, when Brett had the idea of doing a Russian-based Superman story. This was probably 1993 or so.

The book was intended for publication under DC Comics' Vertigo imprint as an eight-issue limited series in collaboration with colorist Dave Stewart and letterer John Workman. A two-page sample of the upcoming series appeared in the April 2003 promotional pamphlet Vertigo X Anniversary Preview; neither Stewart nor Workman were credited in that excerpt, and both the colors and letters would change when the pages later appeared in the series proper. By the time issue #1 appeared in August 2005, the series had become part of the short-lived Wildstorm Signature Series line of creator-owned works, although Vertigo senior editor Will Dennis shared an editing credit with Wildstorm's Alex Sinclair on issues #1 and #2, suggesting that the switchover came a good ways into production.

After the six-month delay and a change of editor (to Scott Dunbier), issue #4 (April 2006)'s cover stated that the book was now a six-issue miniseries. Issue #5 (October 2006)'s solicitation announced that there will be eight issues again, although the actual issue included the message that this was the last regular issue and the story would be completed in The Winter Special, announced for 2007 but actually released two years after #5, on December 31, 2008 as an oversized 40 page special.

== Collected editions ==
The trade paperback of the Winter Men was solicited for release on November 25, 2009.

- Winter Men (176 pages, Wildstorm, December 2009, ISBN 1-4012-2526-8, Titan Books, January 2010, ISBN 1-84856-516-X)

An Artist's Edition of the series with full-size reproductions of Leon's original artwork was published in 2022 via the crowd-funding platform Zoop.

== Reception ==
Comic Bulletin gave the first issue full marks and said "Brett Lewis comes off as an astute observer of the contemporary Russian cultural milieu, and, via an injection of superheroic fantasy into real Soviet history, he draws powerful portraits of his tragic protagonist, Kalenov, and the nation as a whole." Stumblebum Studios was impressed by the research saying,[The Winter Men] "is one hell of a dense book, packed to the gills with details and insights into Russia post-Reform". The Fourth Rail felt "Brett Lewis's script challenges the reader with its complexity and its immersion in modern Russian culture. And he's been paired with an artist whose style is perfect for bringing the cold, stark and dingy quality of the backdrop to life." Ain't It Cool News concluded their review of the first three issues with a similar opinion "is a book with a singular voice and style the likes of which I haven’t seen in quite a while."

Sales estimates started off with issue #1 at 11,340 (#163 in the top 300) but dropped to 8,862 (position #168) with issue two. Sales then slowly dropped from 8,324 (#186) for issue #3 to 7,129 (#187) and ending on issue #5 with estimates of 6,480 sales (at a position of #180)

== See also ==
- The Programme, another Wildstorm title that dealt with the fallout from Cold War superhumans
