= ChrisCross =

American comic book illustrator

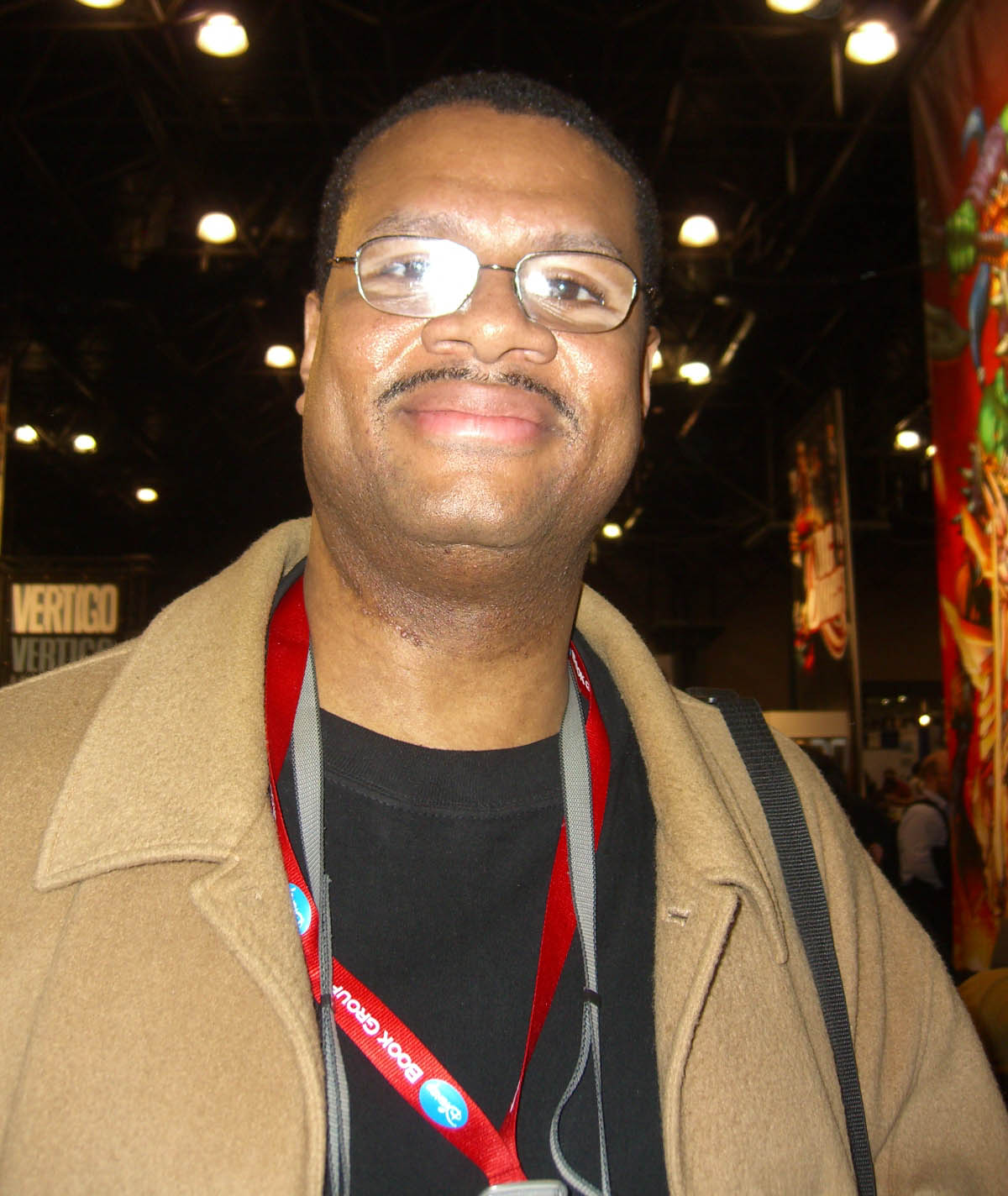
- ChrisCross at the New York Comic Con in February 2008.
- Born: Christopher Williams
- Area: Artist
- Notable works: Blood Syndicate; Captain Marvel; Firestorm

Christopher Williams, who goes by ChrisCross, is a comic book illustrator, known mostly for his stints pencilling Milestone Comics' Blood Syndicate and Heroes, Marvel Comics' Captain Marvel and Slingers and DC Comics' Firestorm. He created Jason Rusch, the second Firestorm, with writer Dan Jolley. ChrisCross worked on various Green Lantern projects, especially Green Lantern Corps. At Marvel, ChrisCross worked on short stories with Spider-Man, Mace Windu, Star Wars, Aliens, and Weapon X-Men.

== Education and career ==
Williams attended New York City's School of Visual Arts in the early 1990s. While doing so, he caught his big break doing work for the DC Comics imprint, Milestone Comics, which sought to publish a line of comics aimed at attracting a more multicultural audience.

He has also worked on other series such as Firestorm and The Outsiders for DC Comics. In the early 2000s, Williams worked on a series of hardcover graphic novels for the international publishing house Humanoids Inc. before returning to the States to continue American comics, starting on Midnighter #11.

In 2025, Williams would be a recipient of the Inkpot Award at the annual San Diego Comic Con.

== Bibliography ==
Interior comic work includes:

- Cat and Mouse #13 (with Roland Mann, Tim Eldred and Steven Butler, Aircel, 1993)
- Blood Syndicate #3, 5–14, 16–17, 19, 21–23, 25-30 (with Ivan Velez Jr., Milestone, 1993–1995)
- Worlds Collide: "Chapter Seven" (with various writers and artists, one-shot, Milestone, 1994)
- Hardware #11: "Shadow and Act" (inks on Denys Cowan, written by Dwayne McDuffie, Milestone, 1994)
- Icon #20: "The Big Bang Theory" (with Dwayne McDuffie, Mark D. Bright and John Paul Leon, Milestone, 1994)
- Shadow Cabinet #17: "No Difference in the Dark" (inks on John Paul Leon, written by Matt Wayne, Milestone, 1995)
- Man Against Time #4: "The Butterfly Effect" (with Brett Lewis and David Quinn, Image, 1996)
- Heroes #1-4 (with Matt Wayne, Milestone, 1996)
- Xero #1-8, 11 (with Christopher Priest, DC Comics, 1997–1998)
- Solar, Man of the Atom: Hell on Earth #1-4 (with Christopher Priest and Patrick Zircher, Acclaim, 1998)
- New Year's Evil: Dark Nemesis: "Turncoat!" (with Dan Jurgens, one-shot, DC Comics, 1998)
- X-Man #35-38, Annual '98 (with Terry Kavanagh, Marvel, 1998)
- Slingers #1-3, 5–6, 9-10 (with Joe Harris, Marvel, 1998–1999)
- Shadowman vol. 3 #3: "Asylum Seeker" (with Dan Abnett and Andy Lanning, Acclaim, 1999)
- Captain Marvel vol. 3 #0-3, 6–10, 12–13, 15–16, 19–25, 27, 29-30, 33 and vol. 4 #1-3, 5 (with Peter David, Marvel, 1999–2003)
- The Craptacular B-Sides #1: "Graduation Day" (with Brian David-Marshall, co-feature, Marvel, 2002)
- X-Men Unlimited #48: "Control" (with Chuck Austen, anthology, Marvel, 2003)
- Outsiders vol. 3 #4-6: "Brothers in Blood" (with Judd Winick, DC Comics, 2003–2004)
- JLA #83, 90 (with Joe Kelly, DC Comics, 2003–2004)
- Firestorm vol. 3 #1-5 (with Dan Jolley, DC Comics, 2004)
- Néféritès: L'Embaumeur (with Sylviane Corgiat and Patrick Galliano, graphic novel, Les Humanoïdes Associés, 2006)
- Dead High Yearbook: "Chapter Three: Devil Dog of the Damned" (with Jennifer Camper, graphic novel, Penguin Books, 2007)
- Welcome to Tranquility #8: "Zombie Zeke: Dead End Highway" (with Gail Simone, co-feature, Wildstorm, 2007)
- Midnighter #11: "Anthem, Part Two" (with Keith Giffen, Wildstorm, 2007)
- Justice League of America vol. 2 #29: "Star Struck!" (with Len Wein, DC Comics, 2009)
- Gotham Gazette #1-2: "Stephanie Brown" (with Fabian Nicieza, co-feature, DC Comics, 2009)
- Final Crisis Aftermath: Dance #1, 3–4, 6 (with Joe Casey, DC Comics, 2009)
- Milestone Forever #2 (with Dwayne McDuffie, John Paul Leon and Denys Cowan, Milestone, 2010)
- Spike: The Devil You Know #1-4 (with Bill Williams and José María Beroy, IDW Publishing, 2010)
- Marvel Adventures: Super Heroes #5 (with Paul Tobin, Marvel, 2010)
- T.H.U.N.D.E.R. Agents vol. 3 #2: "Live Fast, Die Young" (with Nick Spencer and CAFU, DC Comics, 2011)
- Superman/Batman #81-84: "Sorcerer Kings" (with Cullen Bunn, DC Comics, 2011)
- Supergirl vol. 5 #65-67: "This is Not My Life" (with Kelly Sue DeConnick, DC Comics, 2011)
- Batwing #4: "Better at Terrible Things" (with Judd Winick, DC Comics, 2012)
- Action Comics vol. 2 #5-6 (with Sholly Fisch, co-feature, DC Comics, 2012)
- Smallville Season 11 Chapters 13–15, 19, 21 (with Bryan Q. Miller, digital, DC Comics, 2012)
- Superboy vol. 5 #20: "A Wretched H.I.V.E." (with Justin Jordan, among other artists, DC Comics, 2013)
- Green Lantern Corps vol. 3 #18, Annual #1 (with Peter Tomasi, DC Comics, 2013)
- Bloodshot vol. 3 #0 (with Matt Kindt, Valiant, 2013)
- Archer and Armstrong vol. 2 #15-17: "Sect Civil War" (with Fred Van Lente and Khari Evans, Valiant, 2013–2014)
- Justice League Dark #23.1: "Twisted" (with Dan DiDio and Ann Nocenti, among other artists, DC Comics, 2013)
- Bloodshot and the H.A.R.D. Corps (with Joshua Dysart and Christos Gage, Valiant):
  - "Get Some" (with Bart Sears, in #17-19, 2014)
  - "Rise and Fall" (with Joseph Cooper and Valentine De Landro, in #0, 2014)
- Katana #9: "Ghost Warriors" (with Ann Nocenti and Cliff Richards, DC Comics, 2014)
- Green Lantern/New Gods: Godhead (with Van Jensen and Justin Jordan, among other artists, one-shot, DC Comics, 2014)
- Convergence: Justice League of America #1-2: "Heroes Interrupted" (with Fabian Nicieza, DC Comics, 2015)
- Superman/Wonder Woman Annual #2: "Taking a Breath" (with Keith Champagne, co-feature, DC Comics, 2016)
- Bankshot #1-4 (of 5) (with Alex De Campi, Dark Horse, 2017)
- Kino #5-9 (with Joe Casey and Chris Batista (#9), Catalyst Prime, 2018)
- Bloodshot: Rising Spirit #7-8 (with Eliot Rahal, among other artists, Valiant, 2019)
- Justice League Odyssey #14: "Enemy of My Enemy" (with Dan Abnett and Cliff Richards, DC Comics, 2019)

=== Covers only ===
- Icon #7-8, 40 (Milestone, 1993–1996)
- Blood Syndicate #24, 35 (Milestone, 1995–1996)
- My Name is Holocaust #5 (Milestone, 1995)
- Long Hot Summer #1 (Milestone, 1995)
- Heroes #5-6 (Milestone, 1996)
- Xero #9-10, 12 (DC Comics, 1998)
- X-Man #39 (Marvel, 1998)
- Slingers #4, 7-8, 11-12 (Marvel, 1998–1999)
- Captain Marvel vol. 3 #5 (Marvel, 2000)
- Black Panther vol. 2 #24 (Marvel, 2000)
- Generation X #74 (Marvel, 2000)
- Noble Causes #3 (Image, 2002)
- Captain Marvel vol. 4 #11, 13, 20-25 (Marvel, 2003–2004)
- Firestorm vol. 3 #6 (DC Comics, 2004)
- Angel: The Curse #3 (IDW Publishing, 2005)
- Spider-Man: The Clone Saga #6 (Marvel, 2010)
- Irredeemable #13 (Boom! Studios, 2010)
- Velocity vol. 2 #1 (Top Cow, 2010)
- New Crusaders #2 (Red Circle, 2012)
- Watson and Holmes #4 (New Paradigm, 2013)
- Bloodshot and the H.A.R.D. Corps #16 (Valiant, 2013)
- Unity #0, 15 (Valiant, 2014–2015)
- X-O Manowar vol. 3 #33, 46 (Valiant, 2015–2016)
- Accell #5, 8-9 (Catalyst Prime, 2017–2018)
- Black Lightning/Hong Kong Phooey #1 (Hanna-Barbera, 2018)
- Fallen World #4 (Valiant, 2019)
