= Worlds Collide (comics) =

1994 comic book event

- Worlds Collide #1 (July 1994), art by Mark D. Bright.
- Publisher: DC Comics
- Publication date: July – August 1994
- Genre: Superhero; Crossover
Title(s)
Blood Syndicate #16–17
Hardware #17–18
Icon #15–16
Static #14
Steel #6–7
Superboy vol. 3, #6–7
Superman: The Man of Steel #35–36
Worlds Collide #1
- Main character(s): (DC Comics): Superman; Superboy (Conner Kent); Steel (John Henry Irons) (Milestone Comics): Icon; Rocket; Static; Hardware; Blood Syndicate

Creative team
- Writer(s): Dwayne McDuffie; Ivan Velez Jr. Robert L. Washington III
- Penciller(s): John Paul Leon; Chris Batista; Tom Grummett; Mark D. Bright; Denys Cowan; Christopher Williams
- Inker(s): Rober Quijano; Bobby Rae; Art Nichols; Romeo Tanghal; Prentice Rollins
- Colorist(s): Noelle Giddings; Andrew Burrell; Micheline Hess; Jason Scott Jones

"Worlds Collide" is an intercompany crossover event presented in July 1994 in the Milestone Comics titles and the Superman-related titles published by DC Comics. A one-shot comic title of the same name was written by Dwayne McDuffie, Ivan Velez Jr. and Robert L. Washington III.

== Publication history ==
In the summer of 1994, DC Comics and Milestone Media published an intercompany crossover called Worlds Collide. It featured a meeting between Metropolis-based superheroes from the DC Universe and Dakota-based superheroes from the Dakotaverse. Unlike many intercompany crossovers, it was intended to be part of the regular continuity and took place in the monthly issues of the involved series.

The situation was somewhat complicated by the fact that in the Dakotaverse, DC superheroes such as Superman were known as fictional characters from comic books. Although the crossover initially had no lasting consequences in DC continuity (DC's Zero Hour event cancelled out everything before), it was remembered by Milestone's superheroes.

== Plot ==
A postal worker named Fred Bentson unwittingly becomes a portal between two worlds and two cities, between Dakota, home city of the Milestone heroes, and Metropolis, home of Superman. Eventually Bentson loses control of his powers and transforms into Rift, a cosmic being capable of manipulating and reconfiguring matter on a subatomic scale. The heroes of the two universes come together to stop him and seal the dangerous crack in reality between their worlds.

== Revised continuity ==
In 2008, the continuity of the Milestone characters was modified. Dakota City and the Dakotaverse characters were placed within the mainstream DC Universe. Static encounters the Terror Titans, which leads to his eventual membership with their heroic counterparts, the Teen Titans. The Shadow Cabinet—along with Hardware, Icon and Rocket—clashes with the Justice League of America. It is revealed that Icon and Superman are acquainted and have tremendous respect for each other. Additionally, it becomes apparent that the Cooperative (from which Icon hails) is known to the Green Lantern Corps and the Guardians of the Universe, but is exempt from their jurisdiction.

Eventually, the being known as Dharma explains the origin of the revised continuity to Icon and Superman. Following the death of Darkseid in Final Crisis, the space-time continuum is torn asunder, threatening the existence of both the Dakotaverse and the mainstream DC Universe. Dharma was able to use energies that he harnessed from Rift upon his defeat to merge the two universes, creating an entirely new continuity. Only Dharma, Icon and Superman are aware that Dakota and its inhabitants ever existed in a parallel universe.

== Bibliography ==
- Part 1 – Superman: The Man of Steel #35
- Part 2 – Hardware #17
- Part 3 – Superboy #6
- Part 4 – Icon #15
- Part 5 – Steel #6
- Part 6 – Blood Syndicate #16
- Part 7 – Worlds Collide #1
- Part 8 – Superboy #7
- Part 9 – Hardware #18
- Part 10 – Superman: The Man of Steel #36
- Part 11 – Icon #16
- Part 12 – Steel #7
- Part 13 – Blood Syndicate #17
- Part 14 – Static #14
