= Dharma (character) =

- Dharma as depicted in Shadow Cabinet #6 (November 1994). Art by John Paul Leon (penciller), Shawn Martinbrough (inker), and Julia Lacquement (colorist).

Publication information
- Publisher: DC Comics
- First appearance: Hardware #11 (1994)
- Created by: Dwayne McDuffie (writer); Denys Cowan (artist)

In-story information
- Alter ego: Harry Chawney
- Team affiliations: Shadow Cabinet
- Abilities: Precognition; Psychometry; Energy manipulation Reality warping and manipulation

Dharma (Harry Chawney) is a fictional comic book character distributed by DC Comics, and the leader of the Shadow Cabinet. Originating in Milestone Comics media, he first appeared in Hardware #11 (January 1993), and was created by Dwayne McDuffie, Robert L. Washington III, and Denys Cowan.

== Fictional character biography ==
Dharma has the power to perceive the past and future of any object he touches. He has perceived countless apocalypses and is ruthless in acting to prevent them, whatever the cost. In theory, he knows the ultimate consequences of whatever action he sends his operatives to perform; however, the impossibility of considering every factor has led to his fear that he may be causing the disasters he is trying to prevent.

In Blood Syndicate #20, Dharma fires Oro, who has been a Syndicate associate, police officer, and a Shadow Cabinet operative. He is allowed to keep his costume and receives one month severance pay deposited directly into his bank account. Dharma even gives Oro advice to "take the left" as Oro teleports out.

The teleportation technology is maintained by powerful telekinetic and engineer Thomas Hague, better known as "Mechanic". Another notable employee is Payback, a spy for the independent superhero Icon. Icon also has evidence that Dharma had been involved in the 'Big Bang', a riot which ended in dozens of people being killed by modified tear gas and the survivors gaining superpowers.

It is later revealed that Dharma orchestrated the Big Bang to create powerful beings capable of preventing an approaching apocalypse whose cause he could not determine. When his last two prospects (Hardware and Static) fail to meet his expectations, he turns to the only course he believes is left open to him, awakening and harnessing the powers of the god-like being Rift. The act of absorbing Rift's powers destroys the universe, making Dharma the cause of the apocalypse he foresaw. The effects of Darkseid's death during Final Crisis allow Dharma to merge the remnants of the Dakotaverse into the DC Universe, retroactively combining their histories.

== Powers and abilities ==
Dharma possesses incredibly powerful precognitive abilities. When he touches a personal object, Dharma can see all events that occur in its past and future. This ability extends as far as the entire Earth itself or something as small as a bead. Not only can he see an object's future, he can see his own and his universe's future. This power extends to the object's past as well. Hence, any place it has been or anything that has been done to it is clear to Dharma. When he focuses his psychometric on a certain person he can not only see their future and past but also understand and therefore manipulate their abilities. Dharma is blind, but compensates by using his powers to guide him.

Dharma has been able to see the beginning of the universe and all that goes on in the present. At a certain point in the future (its "end"), he sees only the destruction of his universe. This blind spot prevents Dharma from seeing what role he will play or what outcome happens after the destruction. After absorbing Rift's powers, Dharma gains the ability to alter reality and bend dimensions. At one point, in the original Milestone world, he absorbed his sisters known as Plus. This gave him the ability to control a living energy field that could be used for offensive as well as defensive purposes.

== See also ==
- Shadow Cabinet
