= Rocket (DC Comics) =

- Rocket from Icon #35, art by M. D. Bright.

Publication information
- Publisher: DC Comics
- First appearance: Icon #1 (May 1993)
- Created by: Dwayne McDuffie; Denys Cowan

In-story information
- Alter ego: Raquel Ervin
- Team affiliations: Shadow Cabinet; Star Chamber; Young Justice; Justice League
- Partnerships: Icon; Static
- Abilities: Expert athlete and acrobat; Skilled hand-to-hand combatant; Inertia Belt grants: Superhuman strength; Flight; Kinetic energy manipulation; Force field generation

Rocket (Raquel Ervin) is a superheroine appearing in comic books published by DC Comics, who was introduced by Milestone Media. She was the sidekick of the superhero Icon. Rocket's powers come from her inertia belt, based on tech from Icon's ship.

Rocket has made limited appearances in media outside comics. Kali Troy voices the character in Young Justice, with Denise Boutte replacing her in later seasons.

== Publication history ==
An original character from DC's Milestone Comics imprint, she first appeared in Icon #1 (May 1993) where she was created by Dwayne McDuffie (writer), Denys Cowan, and Mark Bright.

Rocket, along with Milestone Universe and characters, was revived and merged into the DC Universe proper in the late 2000s. The merger treats the characters as new to the universe, ignoring the "Worlds Collide" Milestone/DC crossover of 1994. Rocket reappeared in Justice League of America (vol. 2) #27, written by creator Dwayne McDuffie.

Rocket was reintroduced alongside Icon in the 2021 Milestone Returns initiative. The character retains her identity as Raquel Ervin, a teenager from Dakota who becomes the partner of the alien superhero Icon after persuading him to resume using his powers publicly. Her inertia belt, derived from technology associated with Icon's spacecraft, gives her the ability to manipulate kinetic energy, fly and generate protective force fields.

== Character biography ==
Raquel Ervin was born in Paris Island, the poorest, most crime-ridden neighborhood in Dakota City. Although she is only the sidekick of the title character, Icon, she is the actual protagonist of the series. She yearned to become a writer like Toni Morrison, but lacked inspiration until she met Augustus Freeman IV, a corporate lawyer who was secretly a stranded alien with superhuman powers. This occurred while she and her friends were robbing Freeman's home. Raquel convinced Augustus to become the superhero Icon, and to take her on as his sidekick, Rocket. While in costume, she wore a belt that Icon fashioned out of his escape pod's inertia winder, which allowed her to manipulate kinetic energy.

Shortly after she began adventuring with Icon, Raquel discovered that she was pregnant by her ex-boyfriend, Noble (one of the other robbers from the day she met Freeman). She gave birth to a son, Amistad, who is named after a ship that transported slaves from France to the United States. While her pregnancy caused her to give up adventuring for a time, Raquel eventually became a superhero again.

Rocket also assists the Blood Syndicate member Flashback in fighting her addiction to crack cocaine. Rocket was more liberal than Icon, which caused them to clash on a number of occasions. She befriended Static, another teenage superhero from Dakota City.

=== DC Universe ===
Following the death of Darkseid in Final Crisis, the space-time continuum is torn asunder, threatening the existence of both the Dakotaverse and the mainstream DC universe. Dharma uses energy that he harnessed from the entity Rift to merge the two universes, creating an entirely new continuity. In the revised continuity, Rocket and the other Milestone characters have always existed in the DC Universe.

Rocket makes her first DCU appearance in Justice League of America (vol. 2) #30, intervening at Icon's request when Batman, Zatanna, Firestorm, and Black Lightning attack several members of the Shadow Cabinet while on a mission in the city of Metropolis. Believing Raquel and the Shadow Cabinet agents have kidnapped former Justice League International member Kimiyo Hoshi (Dr. Light), Batman attempts to strike Rocket with a batarang, which she deflects. After berating Batman and informing him that Kimiyo is unharmed, Rocket accompanies the Shadow Cabinet and Justice League members to the Justice League Satellite, where they battle the Shadow Thief.

=== Milestone Returns ===
A new version of Rocket receives a greater emphasis as an independent protagonist in Icon & Rocket: Season One, written by Reginald Hudlin and Leon Chills. Although Icon remains the more experienced and powerful member of the partnership, Raquel is presented as an increasingly capable hero whose perspective frequently challenges Augustus Freeman's assumptions about humanity and the responsibilities of superhuman beings. The series was collected by DC in 2022.

During the series, Icon sends Raquel to an exclusive boarding school, believing that she needs experience beyond Dakota if she is eventually to assume greater responsibilities. The move places Rocket in an unfamiliar social environment and allows the series to explore her development independently of Icon. Raquel continues operating as Rocket while balancing school, her personal life and her responsibilities as a superhero.

The new continuity also places greater emphasis on Raquel's future potential. Icon views her not simply as a teenage sidekick but as someone who could eventually become an important leader. Their partnership therefore evolves from the traditional mentor-and-sidekick relationship toward one between two heroes with different experiences and complementary abilities.

Rocket subsequently became involved in the conflict between Icon and Hardware in Icon vs. Hardware, a five-issue limited series published in 2023. The story uses the disagreement between Augustus Freeman and Curtis Metcalf to explore the different philosophies of Dakota's heroes. Rocket is caught between Icon's cautious approach and Hardware's more confrontational methods, further establishing her as a character capable of making her own judgments rather than automatically following her mentor.

In 2026, Rocket appeared in The New History of the DC Universe: The Dakota Incident. The one-shot establishes the relationship between the Milestone characters and the larger DC Universe and features Rocket alongside Static, Icon and other heroes of Dakota. The story concerns a conflict in Dakota City that escalates into a confrontation between the city's heroes and the U.S. government.

The Dakota Incident consequently establishes Rocket as part of the modern DC Universe rather than solely as a character belonging to a separate Milestone continuity. DC describes the story as clarifying where Static, Rocket, Icon, Hardware and the other Dakota heroes fit within DC history. Rocket's modern characterization therefore combines her original role as Icon's protégé with the greater independence given to her in Icon & Rocket: Season One. She remains closely associated with Icon, but the modern stories increasingly portray her as a hero in her own right and as one of the principal representatives of Dakota within the DC Universe.

== Powers and abilities ==
All of Rocket's superhuman powers derive from the inertia winder installed in her belt buckle. When activated, the inertia winder surrounds Rocket in an "inertia field", which absorbs, stores, and redirects any kinetic energy used against it. Rocket's inertia field normally extends a few inches from her body, but she can expand the field to enclose much greater areas. She once used it to protect a small crowd of people without any loss of its durability.

Rocket can release the field's stored energy, giving her a range of offensive abilities. She can strike with superhuman force by surrounding her fists with energy. By releasing all the energy in the inertia field, she can stagger powerful beings like Icon with a single blow. Rocket can also use kinetic energy to increase the force with which she hurls an object, turning it into a dangerous projectile. By releasing stored energy in focus beams, Rocket can project powerful energy blasts from her hands. Rocket can fly by releasing her inertia field's kinetic energy beneath her, launching her skyward.

Rocket later learns to use her inertia winder to surround a target within an "inertialess field" that nulifies kinetic energy, effectively paralyzing them. The field consumes enormous amounts of energy and collapses after a few seconds.

== In other media ==
- Rocket appears in Young Justice, voiced initially by Kali Troy and later by Denise Boutte. This version initially works with Icon before joining the Team. Later in the series, Rocket joins the Justice League and becomes engaged to Noble Davis, with whom she has a son, Amistad.
- Rocket appears as a playable character in Young Justice: Legacy, voiced by Cree Summer.

== Analysis ==
Rocket held liberal views on economic and social issues, which resulted in her often clashing with her conservative partner, Icon. Under her influence, Icon eventually began re-evaluating his views.

W. E. B. Du Bois's The Souls of Black Folk was a major influence in shaping Rocket's liberal views.
