= Matt Wayne =

American writer

- Born: Matt S. Wayne; Cleveland, Ohio, U.S.
- Education: University of Michigan
- Occupation: Writer
- Writing career
- Genres: Comics; Television

Matt S. Wayne is an American writer of comic books and television. Wayne is known for his work on the animated series Niko and the Sword of Light, Cannon Busters and Ben 10: Omniverse, and writing and editing comic books for Milestone Media.

== Biography ==
Wayne was born in Cleveland, Ohio, grew up in Milford, Michigan, and attended the University of Michigan. He was childhood friends with writer Richard Pursel and was high school and college friends with writer Dwayne McDuffie.

=== Comic books ===
Wayne's first comic book credit was for material in Marvel Year-In-Review #1 for Marvel Comics. He then wrote several stories for Hamilton Comics.

When Dwayne McDuffie co-founded the comic book company Milestone Media, Wayne was hired as an editor on titles such as Icon and Hardware. Wayne also wrote several titles, including the series Shadow Cabinet and Heroes.

After Milestone ceased publishing monthly comics in 1997, Wayne wrote for DC Comics.

=== Television ===
Wayne credits his friend Richard Pursel for helping him get his first job writing in television for the animated series Poochini. His friendship and past work with Dwayne McDuffie led to other television writing work, including Static Shock, What's New, Scooby-Doo?, Danny Phantom, Tom and Jerry Tales, Krypto the Superdog, and Storm Hawks.

Wayne was hired to write several episodes of the animated series Justice League Unlimited and was eventually promoted to story editor. Continuing his work on animated projects based on popular comic books, he also wrote several episodes of Legion of Super Heroes and The Spectacular Spider-Man.

Wayne also wrote the screenplay for the animated film, Hellboy Animated: Sword of Storms.

== Screenwriting credits ==
- series head writer denoted in bold

=== Television ===
- Poochini (2002-2003)
- Static Shock (2004)
- What's New, Scooby-Doo? (2005)
- Krypto the Superdog (2005)
- **Justice League Unlimited** (2005-2006): season 3 head writer
- Danny Phantom (2006)
- Biker Mice from Mars (2006)
- Tom and Jerry Tales (2006)
- Legion of Super Heroes (2006-07)
- Storm Hawks (2007)
- Growing Up Creepie (2008)
- Ben 10: Alien Force (2008)
- The Spectacular Spider-Man (2008-2009)
- Batman: The Brave and the Bold (2009)
- My Friends Tigger & Pooh (2009)
- **The Super Hero Squad Show** (2009-2011)
- Ben 10: Ultimate Alien (2010-2012)
- Green Lantern: The Animated Series (2012)
- Transformers: Prime (2012)
- Hero: 108 (2012)
- **Ben 10: Omniverse** (2012-2014)
- Ultimate Spider-Man (2013, 2015-2016)
- Thunderbirds Are Go (2015)
- Guardians of the Galaxy (2015)
- Slugterra (2015-2016)
- Avengers Assemble (2016)
- Justice League Action (2017)
- Transformers: Robots in Disguise (2017)
- Wacky Races (2017-2018)
- **Niko and the Sword of Light** (2017-2019)
- **Cannon Busters** (2019)
- Hello Kitty and Friends Supercute Adventures (2020–present)
- Action Pack (2022)
- Stillwater (2022)
- Samurai Rabbit: The Usagi Chronicles (2022)
- Dino Ranch (2024)

=== Films ===
- Hellboy: Sword of Storms (2006)
- Lego Marvel Super Heroes: Maximum Overload (2013)
- Scooby-Doo! and WWE: Curse of the Speed Demon (2016)

== Bibliography ==
=== Writer ===
- Marvel Year-In-Review #1 (Marvel Comics, 1990) – (one-shot)
- Betty and Me #198–199 (Archie Comics, May–June 1991)
- Toxic! #30–31, (Apocalypse [U.K.] October 17–24, 1991)
- Maggots #1 (Hamilton Comics, November 1991)
- Shadow Cabinet #4–11 (DC Comics [Milestone], September 1994 – April 1995)
- Shadow Cabinet #13–17 (DC Comics [Milestone], June 1995 – October 1995)
- Hardware #23–24 (DC Comics [Milestone], January–February 1995) (credited as Denton Fixx, Jr.)
- Hardware #40–41 (DC Comics [Milestone], June–July 1996)
- Static #36 (DC Comics [Milestone], June 1996)
- Madraven Summer Solstice Special #1 (Hamilton Comics, Summer 1996)
- Heroes #1–6 (DC Comics [Milestone], May 1996 – November 1996)
- Cartoon Network Presents #2 (DC Comics, September 1997)
- Cartoon Network Presents #8 (DC Comics, March 1997)
- Cartoon Network Presents #9 (DC Comics, April 1997)
- Cartoon Network Presents #11 (DC Comics, June 1997)
- Cartoon Network Presents #15 (DC Comics, November 1997)
- Flintstones and the Jetsons #5 (DC Comics, December 1997)
- Flintstones and the Jetsons #9 (DC Comics, April 1998)
- Flintstones and the Jetsons #14 (DC Comics, October 1998)
- Flintstones and the Jetsons #17–18 (DC Comics, January–February 1999)
- Gross Point #3–14 (DC Comics, October 1997 – August 1998)
- Animaniacs #41–43 (DC Comics, October 1998 – December 1998)
- Animaniacs #47 (DC Comics, April 1999)
- Animaniacs #54 (DC Comics, November 1999)
- Animaniacs #57 (DC Comics, February 2000)
- Batman: Legends of the Dark Knight #213 (DC Comics, February 2007)
- Justice League Unlimited #37–38 (DC Comics, November 2007 – December 2007)
- Justice League Unlimited #46 (DC Comics, August 2008)
- Cartoon Network Action Pack #27 (DC Comics, September 2008)
- Batman: The Brave and the Bold #1–4 (DC Comics, January 2009 – April 2009)
- The Brave and the Bold #24 (DC Comics, August 2009)

=== Editor ===
- Hardware #11–41 (DC Comics [Milestone], January 1994 – July 1996)
- Icon #9–38 (DC Comics [Milestone], January 1994 – October 1996)
- Worlds Collide #1 (DC Comics [Milestone], July 1994) – (one-shot)
- Blood Syndicate #31–35 (DC Comics [Milestone], October 1995 – February 1996)
- Static #44–45 (DC Comics [Milestone], February 1997 – March 1997)
