= Ho Che Anderson =

Canadian cartoonist and comics artist

- Born: 1969 (age 56–57) London, England
- Areas: Writer, Penciller, Inker
- Notable works: King Volumes 1-3; Wise Son: The White Wolf

Ho Che Anderson is a cartoonist and comics artist primarily affiliated with Fantagraphics.

== Biography ==
Anderson was born in London to “a Jamaican immigrant who named his son after North Vietnamese leader Ho Chi Minh and Cuban Communist revolutionary Che Guevara.”

Anderson was one of the creators to submit ideas when Fantagraphics put out a call for adult comics and the submission became I Want to Be Your Dog.

He wrote, designed, and illustrated a series of comic books on Martin Luther King Jr. in 1993, wrote the 1996 Wise Son: The White Wolf miniseries for Milestone Comics, and started his Scream Queen series in 2010 at Fantagraphics.

One of the artist's upcoming projects is a complete reprinting of the stories of the World War II Canadian Whites superhero, The Penguin (No relation to the Batman villain) and with an additional original story by himself.
