= Heroes (comics) =

Comic book series

Publication information
- Publisher: DC Comics
- Publication date: May 1996
- Main character: Static

Creative team
- Created by: Matt Wayne; ChrisCross

Heroes is a comic about the titular team of superheroes, published by DC Comics and created by Matt Wayne and ChrisCross.

== Publication history ==
Heroes was originally intended as a replacement in the Milestone Comics line-up for Shadow Cabinet, which was not selling well. The series took several of the Shadow Cabinet's more appealing members and put them in a more traditional superhero team, along with Static, a popular solo character. As Milestone's overall sales continued to decline, it was changed to a limited series. Milestone canceled the remainder of their ongoing series shortly thereafter. Heroes was notable for including Donner and Blitzen, an openly lesbian couple in an otherwise "mainstream" superhero series.

The team consisted primarily of refugees from the Shadow Cabinet, a covert organization dedicated to saving humanity from itself, through questionable means. Fed up with that mode of operation, they and some allies established themselves as an above-ground superhero team, named (off the cuff) "Heroes".

== Synopsis ==
The team comes together when various heroes arrive to help save lives in the aftermath of a town being flooded. They continue to work together which raises the ire of the Shadow Cabinet, whom several of the team have worked for. They are forced to fight a Cabinet attack squad, led by the member called Iron Butterfly.

== Characters ==
- Blitzen – Valerie Kameya, a Japanese speedster.
- Donner – Gerri Brauer, a German strongwoman.
- Iota – Isadora Wellington-Smythe, a young woman with shrinking powers and a satchel of shrunken technology.
- Payback – Kevin Franklin, a Bang Baby able to transform into a large, yellow-green skinned monster with superhuman strength and durability.
- Starlight – Stella Maxwell, a college math major with various electromagnetic abilities. She is a "human pulsar".
- Static – Virgil Hawkins, a teen with electromagnetic powers.
