= Chris Batista =

American comic book artist

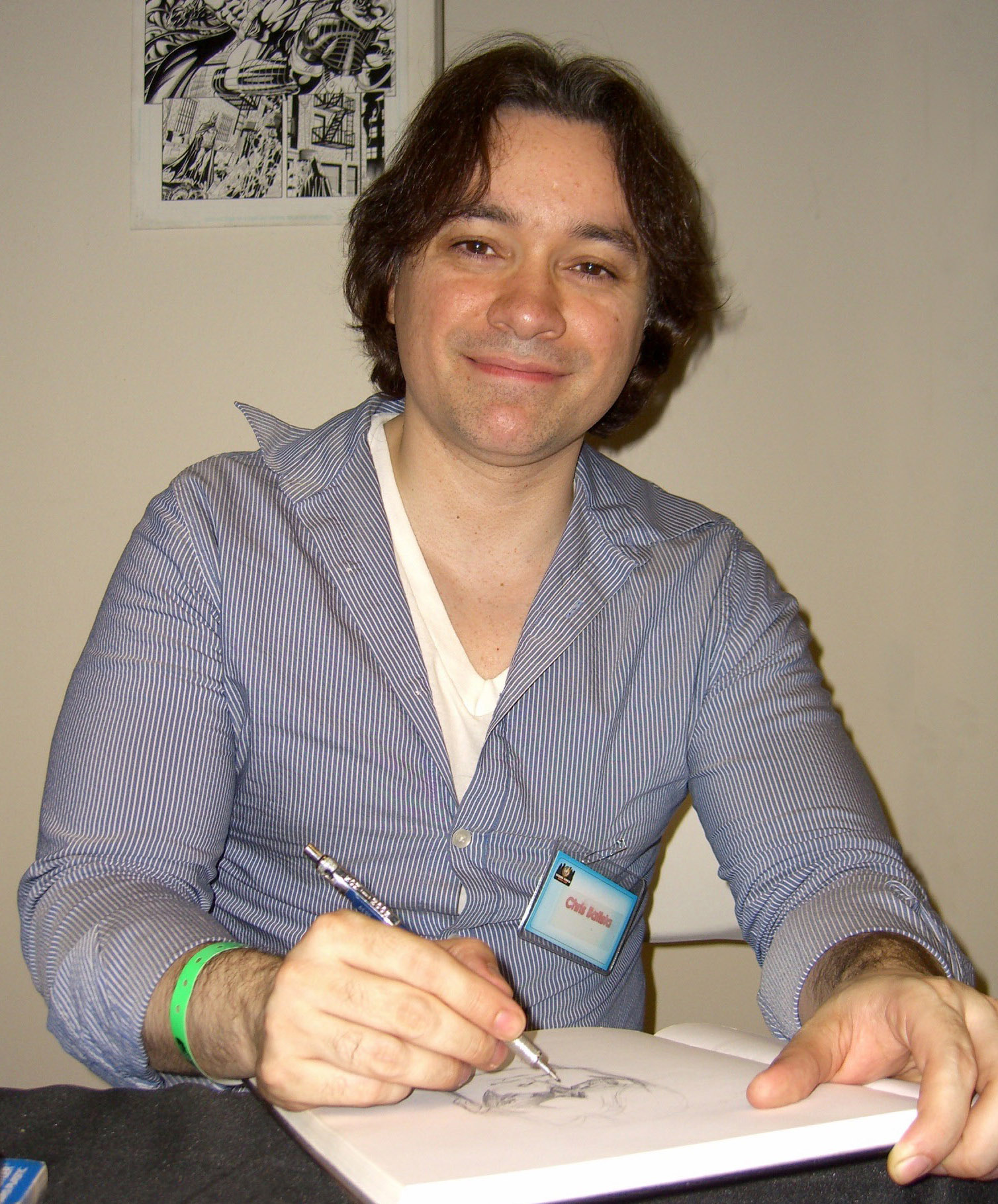
- Batista at the 2011 Big Apple Convention
- Area: Penciller
- Notable works: Spaceknights; The Legion; Robin

Chris Batista is an American comic book artist, known for his work on a number of titles for Marvel Comics and DC Comics, including Steel, Spaceknights and Thunderbolts.

== Career ==
Batista is an alumnus of Manhattan's School of Visual Arts. He studied under Klaus Janson, who helped obtain for him his first professional work.

Titles Batista has contributed to include Steel (1993–1995), Spider-Man 2099 (1994), Spaceknights (2000–2001), Thunderbolts (2002–2003), The Legion (2003–2004), JLA (2005) and has provided art for several issues of DC Comics weekly year-long comic book series 52 (2006–2007).

He also penciled an arc of DC's Robin with Chuck Dixon. He pencilled the second volume of Booster Gold, starring the eponymous time-traveling hero.

== Personal life ==
Batista resides in New York City.

== Bibliography ==
- Marvel Swimsuit Special #2 (pencils, Marvel Comics, 1993)
- X-Factor #88-89, Annual #8 (pencils, with Peter David, Marvel Comics, March 1993 - May 1993)
- X-Men Adventures #7-8, 10, 15 (pencils, with Ralph Macchio/Mark Edward Edens, Marvel Comics, June 1993 - January 1994)
- G.I. Joe: A Real American Hero #139-140 (pencils, with Larry Hama, Marvel Comics, August 1993 - September 1993)
- Dr. Strange, Sorcerer Supreme Annual #3 (pencils, with Geoff Isherwood/Scholly Fisch, Marvel Comics, 1993)
- Steel #0, 1–3, 5–8, 9-10 (Covers) 11–13, 15-16 (pencils, with Jon Bogdanove/Louise Simonson, DC Comics, February 1994 - June 1995)
- Spider-Man Magazine #1 (pencils, with Kelly P. Corvese, Marvel Comics, March 1994)
- Worlds Collide #1 (pencils, with Dwayne McDuffie/Ivan Velez Jr. /Robert L. Washington III, DC/Milestone, July 1994)
- Spider-Man 2099 #22-23 (with Peter David, Marvel Comics, August–September 1994)
- Justice League Quarterly #17 (DC Comics, Winter 1994)
- X-Men (vol. 2) #14 (with Ralph Macchio/Fabian Nicieza, Marvel Comics, March 1995)
- Black Lightning #7 (with Tony Isabella, DC Comics, August 1995)
- Deathstroke #52 (with Marv Wolfman, DC Comics, October 1995)
- Shi: Senryaku #2 (with Kurt Busiek/Gary Cohn, Crusade Comics, October 1995)
- Vampirella Pin-Up Special #1 (Harris Comics, October 1995)
- Extreme Justice #10,12-14 (Covers, with Christopher Priest, DC Comics, November 1995 - March 1996)
- Underworld Unleashed: Patterns of Fear #1 (with Roger Stern, DC Comics, December 1995)
- Doomsday Annual #1 (with Louise Simonson, DC Comics, 1995)
- Vengeance of Vampirella #22 (with Tom Sniegoski, Harris Comics, January 1996)
- Justice League Task Force #30-33 (Covers, with Ivan Velez Jr., DC Comics, December 1995 - March 1996)
- Green Lantern #84, 90, 107 (with Ron Marz, DC Comics, March 1997 - December 1998)
- Professor Xavier and the X-Men #16 (cover), 17-18 (with Jorge González, Marvel Comics, February 1997 - April 1997)
- JLA Gallery (one-shot) (DC Comics, July 1997)
- Turok: Tales of The Lost Land #1 (with Fabian Nicieza, Valiant Comics, April 1998)
- Magnus Robot Fighter #15 (with D. G. Chichester/Tom Peyer, Valiant Comics, July 1998)
- Trinity Angels #8-9, 11-12 (with Kevin Maguire, Crusade Comics, February 1998 - February 1999)
- BlackJack: Blood and Honor TPB (with Alex Simmons, Dark Angel Productions, December 1999)
- Spaceknights (script and art, with co-author Jim Starlin, 5-issue limited series, Marvel Comics, October 2000 - February 2001)
- Spider-Girl #39 (with Tom Defalco, Marvel Comics, December 2001)
- Shi: The Illustrated Warrior #2 (with Billy Tucci/Craig Shaw Gardner, Crusade Comics, 2002)
- Iron Man #49 (with Frank Tieri, Marvel Comics, February 2002)
- Marvel Universe: Millennial Visions #1 (Writer/Artist, Marvel Comics, February 2002)
- Captain Marvel #28 (with Peter David, Marvel Comics, March 2002)
- The Order #2 (with Kurt Busiek/Jo Duffy, Marvel Comics, May 2002)
- JLA/JSA Secret Files and Origins #1 (with Joe Kelly, DC Comics, January 2003)
- Thunderbolts #66, 68, 72, 74 (with Fabian Nicieza, Marvel Comics, August 2002 - January 2003)
- JLA-Z #1 (with Mike McAvennie, DC Comics, November 2003)
- The Legion #19-23, 25–30, 32-33 (with Dan Abnett/Andy Lanning, DC Comics, June 2003 - July 2004)
- Firestorm #6 (with Justin Gray/Jimmy Palmiotti, DC Comics, December 2004)
- Aquaman #23-24 (with John Ostrander, DC Comics, December 2004 - January 2005)
- JLA #115-119 (with Allan Heinberg/Geoff Johns, DC Comics, August–November 2005)
- Hawkman #47-49 (with Justin Gray/Jimmy Palmiotti, DC Comics, February 2006 - April 2006)
- 52 #5, 10, 17, 20, 29, 31, 40, 45, 52 (art, with writers Geoff Johns/Grant Morrison/Greg Rucka/Mark Waid and layouts by Keith Giffen, DC Comics, June 2006 - May 2007)
- Teen Titans #47 (with Adam Beechen, DC Comics, July 2007)
- Superman Confidential #8-9 (with Dan Abnett/Andy Lanning, DC Comics, December 2007 - January 2008)
- Robin #170-174 (with Chuck Dixon, DC Comics, March–July 2008)
- Superman/Batman Annual #3 (with Len Wein, DC Comics, March 2009)
- The Last Days of Animal Man (with Gerry Conway, 6-issue limited series, DC Comics, July–December 2009)
- Titans #21 (with J. T. Krul, DC Comics, March 2010)
- Wonder Woman #41 (with Gail Simone, DC Comics, April 2010)
- Booster Gold #32-35, #37-39, #41-43 (with J.M. DeMatteis/Keith Giffen, DC Comics, July 2010-June 2011)
- Green Lantern: Emerald Warriors #12 (with Peter Tomasi, DC Comics, September 2011)
- Batman Beyond #8 (with Adam Beechen, DC Comics, October 2011)
- Legion: Secret Origin #1-6 (with Paul Levitz, DC Comics, December 2011-May 2012)
- Spaceknights (2012; script and art, with co-author Jim Starlin, 3-issue limited series, Marvel Comics, December 2012 - February 2013)
- Flash #23.1 (with Brian Buccellato, DC Comics, November 2013)
- Stormwatch #28 (Cover, with Jim Starlin, DC Comics, April 2014)
- Green Lantern Corps #30 (with Van Jensen/Scott Kolins, DC Comics, June 2014)

== Notes ==
Preceded by Patrick Zircher	Thunderbolts artist 2002 (with Patrick Zircher)	Succeeded by Manuel Garcia
Preceded by David Baldeon	Robin artist 2008	Succeeded by Joe Bennett
