= Big Bang (comics) =

Fictional event in DC Comics universe

The Big Bang is a Milestone Comics event published by DC Comics, which acts as the origin for several characters featured in their comics. The event was first chronicled in Blood Syndicate #1 by Dwayne McDuffie, Ivan Velez Jr. and Denys Cowan, and Static #1 (April 1993) by Dwayne McDuffie and Robert L. Washington III.

== Publication history ==
The Big Bang is a significant event in the fictional history of Milestone Comics, in which many of the superheroes and supervillains of Dakota City - including Static and the Blood Syndicate - got their powers. The concept was created by Christopher Priest and inspired by urban legends about chemicals being added to Tahitian Treat soda to sterilize black people.

The event took place on Paris Island, which had long suffered from heated gang wars. In 1993, the leaders of each gang decided to settle their grievances in a massive confrontation which the police soon learn of. Mayor Thomasina Jefferson ordered the police to spray every gang member present with an experimental tear gas laced with a radioactive marker that would allow the police to track the participants down later.

The gas contained a mutagen called "quantum juice", which killed most exposed to it and gave the survivors superpowers. The survivors were dubbed "bang babies". The members of two gangs - the Paris Bloods and Force Syndicate - formed the core of the Blood Syndicate, a gang of bang babies who claimed Paris Island as their turf.

== In other media ==
In the animated series Static Shock, the Big Bang is described through a flashback narrated by Static. A confrontation between two gangs (one led by Francis Stone, the future Hot-Streak, the other led by Wade) takes place in a restricted area on the docks. The fighting attracts the attention of the police, who arrive in helicopters and call for the gang members to drop their weapons. As the gang members run, one of them shoots out the helicopter searchlight. The police respond by shooting a tear gas grenade into the area, which destroys a group of barrels in storage and covers the area in mutagenic gas. The gang members and anyone else nearby gain superpowers after being exposed to the gas and become known as "Bang Babies". In the series finale "Power Outage", most of the Bang Babies lose their powers after a cure is secretly spread throughout Dakota City.

== See also ==
- Metahuman
