= Wise Son: The White Wolf =

Comic book by Ho Che Anderson

- Wise Son #1, artist Ho Che Anderson.

Publication information
- Publisher: DC Comics
- Schedule: Monthly
- Format: Mini-series
- Publication date: July 1996 - October 1996
- No. of issues: 4
- Main character: Wise Son

Creative team as of 1996
- Created by: Ho Che Anderson

Wise Son: The White Wolf is a four-issue comic book limited series by Ho Che Anderson, published by Milestone Media in July 1996.

== Publication history ==
Wise Son (or Wise): Hannibal White, leader of the Blood Syndicate after Texador's death and a Black Muslim ("Wise Son" is a Qur'anic reference), is invulnerable. Although he is able to, for instance, shave his head (as he did in this miniseries), he is completely immune from physical harm. He has also shown the ability to resist mental manipulation, and to survive the draining of large quantities of his lifeforce. He is the father of Edmund White, and has sole custody.

== Synopsis ==
Hannibal's efforts to deal with the chaotic events of his life are further hampered when a racist group targets the local black community. The efforts to fight back against the racists creates further problems.
