= Shadow Cabinet (comics) =

Fictional intelligence agency created by Milestone Comics

- The Shadow Cabinet confronts Dharma, art by John Paul Leon.

Publication information
- Publisher: DC Comics
- First appearance: Shadow Cabinet #0 (January 1994)
- Created by: Dwayne McDuffie (writer); Robert L. Washington III (writer); John Paul Leon (artist)

In-story information
- Base(s): Shadowspire
- Member(s): Blitzen; Dharma; Donner; Gloria Mundi; Iota; Iron Butterfly; Mechanic; Oro; Payback; Plus; Sideshow; Starlight; Twilight

The Shadow Cabinet is a superhero team created by Milestone Comics and published by DC Comics. They first appeared in Shadow Cabinet #0 (January 1994), and were created by Dwayne McDuffie, Robert L. Washington III and John Paul Leon. Almost all of the original run, issues #4-11 and #13-17, were written by Matt Wayne.

== Team biography ==
The Shadow Cabinet is a secret organization of superhuman beings acting to protect the world by neutralizing potential threats before they grow out of control. Various Cabinet members may be sent on "deep-cover" missions lasting months, or even years. The group's total membership at any time is known only to their leader.

The base of operations for the Shadow Cabinet is the Shadowspire, a subterranean complex within the Himalayas and typically accessible only via the Shadowslide, a teleporter. If the subject's origin is not in complete darkness at the time of teleport, the Shadowslide overloads and cannot be used for up to an hour.

A new Shadow Cabinet emerged in the post-Infinite Crisis DC Universe in the series Justice League of America. After attempting to abduct Doctor Light they find themselves in conflict with the Justice League. It turns out that Icon and Superman were secretly working together; the two teams end up joining forces to save the universe.

=== DC Universe ===
Following the death of Darkseid in Final Crisis, the space-time continuum is torn asunder, threatening the existence of both the Dakotaverse and the mainstream DC Universe. Dharma uses energy harnessed from Rift to merge the two universes, creating an entirely new continuity. Only Dharma, Icon, and Superman are aware that Dakota and its inhabitants were originally from a parallel universe.

=== Milestone Forever ===
In the 2010 limited series Milestone Forever, it is revealed that Dharma was responsible for the Big Bang, hoping to create powerful beings capable of preventing a fast-approaching apocalypse whose cause he could not determine. When his last two prospects, Hardware and Static, fail to meet his expectations, he turns to the only course he believes is left open to him; awakening and harnessing the powers of Rift. However, Rift's awakening leads to the Milestone universe being destroyed, with Dharma combining its remnants with the DC universe.

== Membership ==
=== Past members ===
Red Dog, an Irish sorcerer, was the leader of the Shadow Cabinet from the late 19th century to the mid-20th century. Red Dog later recruited Dharma as his replacement and resurrected him after Dharma was betrayed and killed by one of his followers. However, Red Dog disagreed with Dharma's ideologies and formed his own Cabinet to stop him.

=== Modern team ===
- Dharma is the leader of the Shadow Cabinet and possesses psychometry, the power to perceive the past and future of any object he touches. He has perceived countless apocalypses, and is ruthless in acting to prevent them, whatever the cost. In theory, Dharma knows the ultimate consequences of whatever action he sends his operatives to perform, but the impossibility of considering every factor causes him to fear that he may be causing the disasters he is trying to prevent.
- Bad Betty is a cyborg who was sent on a deep-cover mission to infiltrate organized crime.
- Blitzen (Valerie Kameya) is a Japanese biochemist who gained superhuman speed from a substance she developed herself. She is in a lesbian marriage with Donner, with the two going on to join Heroes.

Harry Chawney (Dharma), artist John Paul Leon.

- Donner (Gerri Brauer) is the granddaughter of a Nazi geneticist and possesses superhuman strength and durability. She is in a lesbian marriage with Blitzen, with the two going on to join Heroes.
- Epiphany appeared only once, upon being recalled from a deep-cover mission.
- Iota (Isadora Wellington-Smythe) is an international jewel thief with the ability to shrink herself and other objects.
- Iron Butterfly (Kahina Eskandari) is a Palestinian with the ability to control all metallic substances.
- Payback (Kevin Franklin) is a Bang Baby who can transform into a green monster with superhuman strength and durability.
- Plus (Bina and Apurna Chawney) are the teenage sisters of Harry Chawney (Dharma). Apurna is an energy being and lacks physical form; Bina uses this energy to fly and manipulate objects.
- Ramjet is a retired mercenary possessing superhuman strength and the power of flight. He first appeared upon being recalled from a deep-cover mission. Ramjet was later part of the Shadow Cabinet operatives ordered to destroy the Heroes.
- Sideshow (Ramon Rand) is a photojournalist who can transform any part of his body into the equivalent body part of any other animal species. This enables him to recover instantly from intoxication.
- Starlight (Stella Maxwell) is a college math major turned human pulsar with various electromagnetic abilities. Starlight later joins Heroes.
- Twilight: Twilight resembles a silhouette of a man wearing a top hat. His body acts as a portal to another dimension, which is home to a collection of supernatural creatures which he has acquired over the years.
- Windshear is capable of mentally creating whirlwinds of varying size and strength. She first appeared upon being recalled from a deep-cover mission. Windshear was later part of the Shadow Cabinet operatives ordered to destroy the Heroes.

=== Star Chamber ===
Star Chamber members

Star Chamber is a rogue faction which disagrees with Dharma; all its operatives have defected from the main group. Star Chamber also included several new recruits: Holocaust, Harm, Rocket and Xombi. All four left the group during the Shadow War.

- Ash is able to artificially induce rapid aging in inorganic objects, turning them to dust. Ash can induce this effect by touch or at a distance if the target is within line of sight. She also can telekinetically control any dust in her vicinity. Thus, Ash can create blinding dust storms or project dust as focused, high speed streams that rapidly erode their targets.
- Funyl is able to teleport himself or others via funnel-shaped teleportation portals.
- Headmaster has psychic abilities including mind control, characterized by a number of devices of various shapes which orbit his head.
- Rainsaw is a living cloud of several million microscopic razor-sharp fragments of metal capable of flying through the air at hurricane speeds. Rainsaw is capable of tearing through armor plating in less than a second. He can also turn his cloud-like form into any continuous shape imaginable. Rainsaw can revert to a roughly humanoid form, in which he is capable of limited shapeshifting such as turning his hands into buzzsaws.
- Slag is superhumanly strong with fire manipulation abilities.
- Transit is able to teleport people and objects she touches over great distances. Transit cannot teleport herself and must rely on other means for travel.
- Wytch has undefined powers. She was seen flying and manipulating unknown energies during their battle with the Shadow Cabinet.

=== DC Universe ===
A new Shadow Cabinet has appeared in the DC Universe proper. Although not officially part of the Shadow Cabinet, Hardware and Rocket were working with them when they confronted the Justice League.

- Blitzen
- Donner
- Iota
- Payback
- Starlight
- Iron Butterfly
- Twilight
- Gloria Mundi
- Dharma
- Sideshow
- Mechanic
- Icon
