= Hardware (character) =

Fictional superhero

- Hardware #1, art by Denys Cowan

Publication information
- Publisher: DC Comics
- First appearance: Hardware #1 (April 1993)
- Created by: Dwayne McDuffie (writer); Denys Cowan (artist)

In-story information
- Alter ego: Curtis Metcalf
- Team affiliations: Hard Co. Alva Industries; Justice League
- Notable aliases: The Cog in the Machine; The High Tech Dreadnaught
- Abilities: Genius-level intellect; Powered armor

Hardware (Curtis Metcalf) is a fictional superhero published by DC Comics. An original character from DC's Milestone Comics imprint, he first appeared in Hardware #1 (April 1993), and was created by Dwayne McDuffie and Denys Cowan.

== Publication history ==
Hardware was the first of Milestone's titles to be published, and (along with Blood Syndicate, Icon, and Static) was one of the company's main titles.

== Fictional character biography ==
=== Milestone Universe ===
Curtis Metcalf is a genius inventor who, in his Hardware identity, uses a variety of high-tech gadgets to fight organised crime. A central irony of the series (of which Metcalf is fully aware) is that Metcalf's employer, respected businessman Edwin Alva—who provides the resources Metcalf uses to create his technology—is secretly the crime boss whom Hardware is trying to bring down.

Metcalf was a working class child prodigy who was discovered aged 12–13 by businessman Edwin Alva, who enrolled him in A Better Chance, "a program intended to get minority students into elite prep schools". Metcalf proves to be much smarter than all the other prep school students, graduating at age 14 and earning his first college degree at age 15. Alva pays for Metcalf's college tuition up to six additional college degrees in exchange for Metcalf being allowed to work in Alva's laboratory. Metcalf's inventions made Alva many millions of dollars.

After several years of working for Alva, Metcalf attempts to request royalties for his inventions, but Alva rejects him, stating that he is no longer of use to him. Metcalf intends to quit working for Alva, but his contract forbids him from working for any competitors. After learning that Alva is deeply corrupt and has ties to organized crime, Metcalf intends to publicly expose him. However, he realizes that the government will not act on this information and decides to become the superhero Hardware to bring down Alva himself.

=== DC Universe ===
Following the death of Darkseid in Final Crisis, the space-time continuum is damaged, threatening the existence of the DC and Dakota universes. Dharma uses energy harnessed from the entity Rift to merge the two universes, creating an entirely new continuity. Only Dharma, Icon, and Superman are aware that Dakota and its inhabitants ever existed in a parallel universe.

In the revised continuity, Hardware and the other Milestone characters have always existed in the DC Universe. The first non-Dakota heroes he encounters are the Justice League of America, whom he meets while aiding the Shadow Cabinet in kidnapping Kimiyo Hoshi and stealing the remains of Arthur Light. After attempting to flee the Justice League Satellite with Light's corpse, Hardware is surprised and beaten into unconsciousness by Hawkman. It is later revealed that, during Hoshi's brief period of captivity, Hardware gave her a new costume which can collect and assimilate light energy.

Soon after, Hardware teams up with Blue Beetle to stop SYSTEM smugglers from selling stolen Alva Industries technology to Intergang. The pair of heroes are ambushed by a smuggler wearing advanced armor designed by Gizmo, an ally of SYSTEM. Despite his initial dislike of Blue Beetle, Hardware parts with him on friendly terms after rounding up the smugglers.

Hardware later appears in the aftermath of the JLA's dissolution following "Final Crisis". After raiding the hideout of Holocaust, he is forced into helping the remaining Justice League members track down Doctor Light, who went missing while chasing Shadow Thief and Starbreaker. Using a tracer installed in Light's costume, Hardware tracks her to the Shadow Cabinet's headquarters, where he and the League and defeat Starbreaker.

=== The New 52 ===
Following the events of Flashpoint and the start of a reboot called "The New 52", Hardware becomes a mentor to Static, who has moved to New York City. He provides the youth with a modified flying disk and a new costume which possesses a holographic interface that allows them to communicate over vast distances. He also gets Static a job as an intern at the New York branch of S.T.A.R. Labs.

=== Milestone Returns ===
Hardware returned as part of DC's 2021, revival of Milestone Comics. Hardware: Season One, reimagines Curtis's struggle against Edwin Alva while retaining the character's defining traits as a brilliant inventor who relies on technology rather than innate superhuman abilities. The series began publication in 2021.

The modern version of Hardware continues to be motivated by his conflict with Alva Industries and Edwin Alva. Curtis's technological brilliance has made him extremely valuable to Alva, but the exploitation of his inventions and Alva's criminal activities eventually turn their relationship into a personal and professional conflict. Curtis responds by developing the Hardware armor and using his inventions against the organization that once employed him. DC's description of the character emphasizes his origins as an inventor who creates the armor after discovering that Alva is involved with organized crime.

Hardware: Season One expands on Curtis's motivations and his relationship with the institutions surrounding him. Unlike Icon and Static, whose powers are largely innate or biological, Hardware remains dependent on his own ingenuity. His armor allows him to compete with superhuman opponents while also reflecting his identity as an engineer and inventor. This technological approach remains central to his characterization in the modern Milestone continuity.

Hardware subsequently became involved in a conflict with Icon in the 2023 limited series Icon vs. Hardware. The five-issue series pits the two Milestone heroes against one another while examining their differing approaches to heroism. Icon possesses extraordinary powers and centuries of experience, whereas Hardware believes that technological innovation and direct action can provide solutions to problems that Icon approaches more cautiously.

The conflict also reflects the increasingly interconnected nature of the modern Dakotaverse. Hardware's rivalry with Icon is not simply a physical confrontation but a disagreement over power, responsibility and the appropriate role of superheroes. The series was published beginning in February 2023 and concluded later that year, with a collected edition released in February 2024.

Hardware's role was subsequently expanded through the 2026 The New History of the DC Universe: The Dakota Incident. The one-shot establishes the history of Dakota City within the broader DC Universe and features Hardware alongside Static, Icon, Rocket and other Milestone characters. The story concerns a violent conflict that turns Dakota into a battlefield and establishes how the city's heroes became connected to the larger DC superhero community.

== Supporting characters ==
Deathwish the vigilante, artist J. H. Williams III

Hardware's protege Technique, artist Jimmy Palmiotti

- Barraki Young is Curtis' girlfriend.
- Don "Jolly Jock" Cornelius is a mob leader. After faking Hardware's death, Harm is left in control of Cornelius' mob sector in Dakota.
- Deacon "Phreaky Deak" Stuart is a hardcore computer hacker and friend of Hardware.
- Deathwish (Wilton Johnson) is a psychotic vigilante obsessed with sex-related crimes. He was the victim of a brutal family raping of which only he survived. Deathwish was first introduced in issue #5 going up against Hardware; Deathwish appeared in Hardware six times and received a solo miniseries in December 1994.
- Edwin Alva is the owner of Alva Industries and the leader of the Indigo Cell in the S.Y.S.T.E.M. organization.
- Edwin Alva Jr. is the son of Edwin Alva.
- Sabrina Alva is the daughter of Edwin Alva and the brother of Edwin Alva Jr. who disagreed with the outcome of her father's will.
- Harm (Nick Pugliese) is a superhuman mob enforcer and undercover cop.
- Reprise is a super-human hitman with the power to make duplicates of himself.
- Technique (Tiffany Evans) is a phenom, introduced in issue #9, who under Alva's orders became Technique to stop Hardware; in the resulting battle Technique beats up on Hardware badly, teaching him a lesson in humility.
- Transit is a teleporting superhuman villain.

== Skills and abilities ==
Curtis Metcalf possesses no superhuman abilities, but possesses genius-level intelligence and is one of the most brilliant scientific minds on the planet. He made critical advancements in metallurgy, computer science, nanotechnology, and plasma weapons. Additionally, Metcalf is a skilled hand-to-hand combatant, receiving training from his father in the martial arts.

=== Equipment ===
==== Hardware version 2.0 armor ====
All of Curtis Metcalf's superhuman abilities derive from his armor. It consists of a self-designed metal alloy, is resistant to bullets and energy, increases Hardware's strength via flexible polymers, and can fly via jet boots. Furthermore, the armor's helmet includes a spectral scanning unit, a radio receiver, radar, a chemical analyzer, a digital video player/recorder, a translator, and a voice modulator.

==== Additional equipment ====
Curtis has designed various pieces of equipment to enhance the capabilities of his Hardware armor. Many of them are hand-held and can be easily carried on his belt. Larger pieces of equipment are mounted on Hardware's helmet, gauntlets and shoulder pads.

- The Quick Pick is a lock-picking tool that can create keys of any shape to pick locks.
- The Sonic Drill is a shoulder-mounted device that creates stunning sonic pulses.
- The Inertia Winder is a device that can absorb and store kinetic energy.

Other equipment Hardware has used include a forearm-mounted welding tool, tracking devices, a handheld scanning device, a laser cutting tool, a flare gun, wrist-mounted flashlights, and a portable electromagnet.

=== Weapons ===
- Omnicannon: A forearm-mounted cannon that fires blasts of compressed air and has a variety of effects depending on the shell equipped.
- Plasma Whip: A magnetic whip that can extend up to 15 feet long and generate plasma.
- Retractable Sword: A sword that can retract and extend up to 30 inches by manipulating its magnetic charge.
- PLASER: A device that generates vaporizing plasma blasts.
- Energy Field: A forearm-mounted device that generates energy barriers.
- Fluid Gun: A gun that generates immobilizing fluids.
- Flow Gun: A handgun made of nanomachines that resemble mercury and can assemble at will.
- Holographic Projection System: This device projects holographic copies of Hardware that he can use to distract or confuse opponents.

Other weapons Hardware uses less frequently include tasers, timed explosives, tranquilizer dart launchers, a flamethrower, a remote-controlled jet thruster, a rocket pistol, a kusarigama, a machine gun that fires explosive bullets, a remotely-controlled Hardware robot, a power shield that blocks energy-draining weaponry, and a field of paralyzing supercool atoms.

=== Transportation ===
- Skylark: A modified Moller M400 Skycar that can fly at speeds above 400 mph, receive television and radio signals, and become invisible.
- Jet-Pack: A personal short-range propulsion rig with turbine thrusters that gather surrounding air, then expel it in a continuous stream.

== Afrofuturism ==
Hardware can be included in the discourse of Afrofuturism based on its adherence to Mark Dery's definition of "speculative fiction that treats African-American themes and addresses African-American concerns in the context of 20th century technoculture—and, more generally, African-American signification that appropriates images of technology and a prosthetically enhanced future".

Curtis Metcalf re-purposes technology as a force of liberation, fighting against the evil Edwin Alva. As Hardware, he uses his superhuman understanding and fluency with technology as a form of agency. Hardware's status as a superhero, through the manipulation of technology, is a means of transcending the digital divide.

== In other media ==
- Hardware makes a cameo appearance in Superman & Batman Magazine #7.
- Hardware makes non-speaking appearances in Young Justice. This version is a member of the Justice League.

== See also ==
- Steel (John Henry Irons) – DC Comics superhero
- Iron Man – Marvel Comics superhero
