= Icon (character) =

- Icon and Rocket from Icon #41; Art by Wilfred Santiago.

Publication information
- Publisher: DC Comics
- First appearance: Icon #1 (May 1993)
- Created by: Dwayne McDuffie (writer); M. D. Bright (artist)

In-story information
- Alter ego: Arnus
- Species: Terminan
- Place of origin: Terminus, The Cooperative
- Team affiliations: Underground Railroad; Union Army; United States Armed Forces; Shadow Cabinet; Justice League
- Partnerships: Rocket (protege)
- Notable aliases: Augustus Freeman IV
- Abilities: Formidable hand to hand combatant Well trained armed/unarmed combatant Vast superhuman strength Superhuman speed, reflexes, stamina and senses Flight; Nigh-invulnerability and durability Enhanced mental perception Regenerative healing factor Extraordinary longevity Ability to generate and project positron energy blasts

Icon (Arnus; alias Augustus Freeman) is a fictional superhero appearing in comic books published by DC Comics, one of the headline characters introduced by Milestone Media in the 1990s. A being from another planet, he has taken on the form of an African-American man, and has abilities such as flight, super-strength, and invulnerability. He uses these in partnership with Rocket, a human teenager using his alien technology, to protect the people of Dakota City.

== Publication history ==
=== Early history ===
An original character from Milestone Comics, he was created by Dwayne McDuffie and M. D. Bright and first appeared in Icon #1 (May 1993). Although published and distributed by DC Comics, the Milestone titles took place in a different continuity. In addition to guest appearances in other titles, the character appeared monthly in his own series, until the Milestone imprint was discontinued in 1997. In 1994, the character was involved in Worlds Collide, a month-long crossover between Milestone and DC Comics' Superman titles.

In the late 2000s, the Milestone Universe and characters were revived and merged into the DC Universe, as part of an agreement between DC Comics and Milestone Media. The merger treated the characters as new to the universe, ignoring the previous crossover. Icon, along with Shadow Cabinet, appeared in Justice League of America (vol. 2) #27, written by McDuffie.

=== Recent history ===
Following a revival of the Milestone characters, Icon was reintroduced in the 2021 Milestone Returns continuity. The new version retains the basic premise of Icon, but places greater emphasis on his relationship with Raquel Ervin and on the social responsibilities associated with his enormous power. DC's 2021 relaunch included Icon & Rocket: Season One, written by Reginald Hudlin and Leon Chills and illustrated by Doug Braithwaite.

In this continuity, Icon has become increasingly concerned with his responsibility to humanity. After meeting Raquel Ervin, he once again adopts the heroic identity of Icon and takes Raquel on as his partner, Rocket. Their relationship is deliberately presented as a partnership between two generations: Icon possesses centuries of experience and near-limitless power, while Rocket provides a younger perspective and a greater connection to the people of Dakota.

Icon & Rocket: Season One also develops the political and personal dimensions of Icon's character. Rather than functioning simply as a super-powered protector, Augustus is portrayed as someone who has accumulated considerable wealth, knowledge and influence during his centuries on Earth. Raquel challenges his tendency to approach problems from a detached, long-term perspective, forcing him to confront the immediate consequences that his decisions can have on ordinary people. The series consequently emphasizes the tension between Icon's desire to protect humanity and his uncertainty about how directly he should intervene in human affairs.

The series also establishes Raquel's increasing independence. Augustus sends her to an exclusive boarding school in order to expose her to a world outside Dakota and prepare her for a larger role. There she encounters a very different social environment from the one in which she grew up, while continuing to operate as Rocket. This becomes an important part of the new version of the Icon and Rocket partnership, with Raquel gradually developing into a hero capable of operating independently rather than merely serving as Icon's sidekick.

Icon later became involved in a conflict with Curtis Metcalf, the inventor known as Hardware. The rivalry formed the basis of the five-issue limited series Icon vs. Hardware, published in 2023. The story builds upon the ideological differences between the two heroes: Icon represents enormous personal power combined with a cautious, philosophical approach to social problems, while Hardware relies on technology, planning and direct action. DC described the series as a clash between two of the central heroes of the Dakotaverse.

The Icon vs. Hardware storyline also continues the development of Rocket and her relationship with Icon. The conflict demonstrates that the heroes of Dakota do not necessarily share the same philosophy despite working toward similar goals. Icon's immense abilities and Hardware's technological expertise make them natural rivals, but their confrontation ultimately reinforces the interconnected nature of the modern Milestone universe. The complete five-issue series was subsequently collected by DC in 2024.

In 2026, Icon became part of a new chapter in DC Universe continuity through The New History of the DC Universe: The Dakota Incident. The one-shot depicts a previously unexplored conflict involving Dakota City and establishes how the Milestone characters fit into the larger DC Universe. Icon appears alongside Static, Rocket, Hardware and other Dakota heroes as their community becomes caught in a conflict involving the U.S. government.

The Dakota Incident represents a significant change in Icon's continuity. Rather than treating the Milestone characters as inhabitants of a completely separate fictional universe, the story incorporates their history into the broader history of the DC Universe. DC subsequently described the issue as a pivotal chapter in establishing the connection between the two superhero traditions.

As a result, Icon's modern status combines elements from the original Milestone comics, the 2021 Milestone Returns relaunch and the contemporary DC Universe. He remains based in Dakota and continues to be closely associated with Rocket, while now existing within the same overall continuity as DC's other major superheroes, such as Superman, Batman and Wonder Woman.

== Fictional character biography ==
In 1839, an alien starliner malfunctioned and exploded, jettisoning a life-pod in the middle of a cotton field in the American South. The pod automatically alters the appearance of its passenger, Arnus, to mimic an enslaved black woman named Miriam, who witnesses the pod land on Earth and adopts Arnus as her son.

In the present, Arnus is still alive. He did not age visibly beyond adulthood; to disguise this fact, he periodically assumes the identity of his own son. By the late 20th century, he is posing as Augustus Freeman IV, the great-grandson of his original human identity.

When Freeman's house is broken into, he uses his powers for the first time in decades. This is witnessed by one of the intruders, Raquel Ervin, an idealistic teenage girl who was born in Paris Island, the poorest, most gang-ridden neighborhood in Dakota City. Her prospects seemed fairly bleak until this encounter with Freeman. After seeing Freeman use his powers, Raquel persuades him to become a superhero named Icon, with herself as his sidekick, Rocket.

=== DC Universe ===
During the Final Crisis storyline, Orion kills his father Darkseid, which destabilizes the space-time continuum and threatens the existence of both the Dakotaverse and the mainstream DC universe. Dharma uses energies harnessed from the entity Rift to merge the two universes, creating an entirely new continuity and altering history so that the residents of the Dakotaverse have always existed in the DC universe. Only Dharma, Icon, and Superman are aware that Dakota and its inhabitants ever existed in a parallel universe.

Icon appears to have an existing friendship with Superman and to be a member of the Shadow Cabinet. Icon also claims that, due to his status as a citizen of the Cooperative (an alien civilization in the Hoag's Object galaxy), he is exempt from prosecution at the hands of the Green Lantern Corps.

After the events of New Krypton led to Kryptonians being banned from Earth, it is shown that Sam Lane is keeping tabs on Icon. It is not made clear whether Lane believes Icon is a Kryptonian, or if he is merely watching him due to his friendship with Superman.

== Supporting characters ==
- Raquel Ervin/Rocket: Raquel saw Augustus Freeman use his powers when his home was being robbed, and convinced him to become a super hero, as well as take her on as sidekick. All of Rocket's superhuman powers derive from her inertia belt, based on tech from Icon's ship.
- Darnice: Raquel's best friend, Darnice took on the role of Rocket while Raquel was on maternity leave (one insisted upon by both Icon and her close friends).
- Amistad Augustus Ervin is Raquel's infant son, named for the Spanish slave ship and for her partner, Icon.

Buck Wild Mercenary Man, artist M.D. Bright.

- Rufus T. Wild/"Buck Wild, Mercenary Man": First appeared in Icon #13 "It's Always Christmas" (May 1994); Buck Wild possessed "belief defyin' strength" and "tungsten hard skin". Wild is a parody of Marvel Comics character Luke Cage. In his next appearance, Wild is recruited to take Icon's place when Icon returns to his home planet. Wild sacrifices himself to stop Oblivion, a mass-murdering alien foe of Icon. In an issue devoted to his funeral, it is revealed that Wild had several alternative identities, all parodies of other famous black superheroes. Wild once used an experimental growth serum which turned him into Buck Goliath (a pastiche of Black Goliath). While working with the hero Patriot, he called himself "Jim Crow" (a pastiche of Falcon) and wore a winged costume allowing him to fly. As "Buck Lightning" (a pastiche of Black Lightning), Wild wore a wrist apparatus that generated lightning bolts.

== Powers and abilities ==
Icon's lifepod altered his DNA so he would resemble a human, thus enabling him to blend among Earth's natives. A side effect of this process was the maximization of his hybrid genetic structure. As a result, Icon possesses a variety of superhuman abilities that are unusual even for a Terminan. Icon possesses immense strength, durability, speed, and senses, and is able to project radiant energy. Icon can project low-energy bolts that can render humans unconscious and overload electronic devices. Icon can focus positron energy into his fists, which he can then use to shatter virtually any substance.

Icon can detect the presence of Bang Babies (superhumans who gained their powers from the Big Bang) by generating a field of positrons. The field interacts with the invisible quantum well surrounding a Bang Baby, who then glows as they give off mild gamma particles. Hence, Icon can use these fields to distinguish Bang Babies from other metahumans as well as normal humans.

Icon ages at a much slower rate than human beings, making him appear middle-aged despite him being several centuries old. Icon's lifespan is typical for a Terminan and the only power that is not the result of his genetic maximization.

=== Skills and equipment ===
Icon is a lawyer with decades of experience. He has also been shown to be a formidable combatant, being well trained in unarmed and armed combat, and having fought in major conflicts ranging from the Civil War to World War II.

For interstellar journeys, Icon employs his personal starship, which possesses a faster-than-light drive that allows it to shift into the realm called hyperspace. Gravity compensators provide artificial gravity that can be adjusted.

Icon's starship is linked to the Info Tool, a computerized database of knowledge that scan an item (organic or inorganic) and store its molecular structure within files called "software". Apart from storing and retrieving data, the Info Tool can link to and control any computer-operated device or system.

The Maker is a molecular factory that can construct any physical item, molecule by molecule, from structural data files stored within the Info Tool. These data files are called "software", while objects created by the Maker are known as "hardware". The Maker operates by tapping the vast energies of the reactor for Icon's starship and converting them into matter used for the construction of hardware. The Maker can create any item in a matter of seconds as long as its structure is on file within the Info Tool.

Icon's ship is equipped with cloaking technology that can render the vessel invisible to both the human eye and electronic surveillance. Though not typical for a civilian vessel, the cloak was installed in Icon's ship so he could use it on Earth without attracting attention.

== Collected editions ==
=== Trade paperbacks ===
#	Title	ISBN	Release date	Collected material
1	Icon: A Hero's Welcome	ISBN 1-56389-339-8 ISBN 1-4012-2549-7	1996 (Reprint: October 6, 2009)	Icon #1–8
2	Icon: The Mothership Connection	ISBN 1-4012-2711-2	June 8, 2010	Icon #13, 19-22, 24-27, and 30

== In other media ==
Icon appears in Young Justice, voiced by Tony Todd. This version is an associate, later member, of the Justice League.

== Politics ==
Icon is a conservative Republican who holds conservative views on economic and social issues, which often put him in conflict with more liberal Milestone Comics superheroes, including his sidekick. Supreme Court justice Clarence Thomas was an avowed fan of Icon, to the extent that he quoted the character on multiple occasions; upon learning of this, author Dwayne McDuffie, who in the blog post he wrote on the matter described himself as liberal, suffered writer's block out of fears that dialogue he wrote would be used in the service of conservatism.

== Awards ==
Icon was nominated for three Eisner Awards and is a three-time winner of Parents' Choice Award honors.
