= Blood Syndicate =

Comic book vigilante gang

- The Blood Syndicate, artist Denys Cowan.

Publication information
- Publisher: DC Comics
- First appearance: Blood Syndicate #1 (April 1993)
- Created by: Dwayne McDuffie (writer); Ivan Velez Jr. (writer); Denys Cowan (artist)

In-story information
- Member(s): Aquamaria; Boogieman; Brickhouse; DMZ; Dogg; Fade; Flashback; Holocaust; Kwai; Masquerade; Oro; Tech-9; Third Rail; Wise Son

The Blood Syndicate is a multicultural vigilante gang of superhumans created by Milestone Comics and published by DC Comics. The team first appeared in Blood Syndicate #1 (April 1993), and was created by Dwayne McDuffie, Ivan Velez Jr. and Denys Cowan.

== Publication history ==
In Milestone Comics' fictional city of Dakota, the Blood Syndicate is a loose affiliation of super-powered individuals brought together by circumstance. 35 issues of the group's eponymous comic book, written largely by Ivan Velez Jr., were published between 1993 and 1996.

The Blood Syndicate differed from other supergroups in being a gang. The group originated as the surviving remnants of multiple street gangs (thus the name, a combination of Paris Island Bloods and Force Syndicate), who had gained superpowers in the Big Bang, and decided to use them for a greater purpose. Their constant in-fighting, the unsustainability of their methods, and their lack of a central vision led to the Syndicate's eventual disintegration.

== Fictional team history ==
The Blood Syndicate was formed in the aftermath of the "Big Bang", a large-scale conflict between Dakota City's gangs. The police attacked the gangsters with tear gas, which contained a radioactive marker intended to act as a tracker. Unbeknownst to the police, the tear gas was laced with a mutagen called "quantum juice". Many gang members and police officers who were exposed to the gas died, with the survivors gaining superpowers. The gang members agree to work together, and after a disagreement, choose the name Blood Syndicate (a combination of the names of the two rival gangs they came from, Paris Bloods and Force Syndicate).

The Blood Syndicate attacks a crack house to steal money for "operating expenses". Their raid killed many addicts and criminals, and gained them another member, Masquerade. He was hired to guard the drugs, but the new gang recruited him to join them instead.

=== Media spotlight ===
Brickhouse and DMZ join the team at some point after their first crackhouse raid and the annihilation of the attack force. Their exploits attract the attention of Dakota's local media. The Dakota Chronicle, the city's most popular newspaper, sends reporter Rob Chaplik to score an interview with the Syndicate. Chaplik is killed by a drug dealer, but Flashback reverses her death by turning back time three seconds and pushes Chaplik out of the way of the blast. Holocaust burns the shooter to death before he can fire again.

Holocaust challenges Tech Nine for leadership of the gang, and by the rules they had set down, they enter a trial by combat to choose which of them would be the leader. Tech Nine is severely beaten, but wins the fight. Holocaust leaves the gang in anger rather than submit to Tech's leadership.

The Blood Syndicate takes in a new member, a rat-man called Boogieman, and seeks purpose. The gang does not have a true focus, but as their leader, Tech Nine tries to give them one. They discover and destroy a hidden lab under a local hospital where Bang Babies were being experimented on. However, the lab's head escapes to set up shop elsewhere. During a later celebration, Tech's body destabilizes due to side effects of the quantum juice and he dies after his flesh melts off his body. Wise Son takes over as leader, but proves to be less popular than Tech.

The Blood Syndicate ponders what to do for money when they ran out of crack houses to rob. Before they can plan, Chinese mobster John Wing sends his forces to kill the Syndicate. Wing is captured and humiliated after Wise Son urinates on him. Wing, desperate to get revenge, murders his wife to summon the Demon Fox. The Fox attacks the Syndicate in their headquarters and nearly kills them. Kwai, the Fox's mirror counterpart, appears and stops it.

In the aftermath of the battle, many of the Blood Syndicate's members learn each other's secrets. Flashback wakes up near Boogieman and learns that he is white. Fade wakes up before Masquerade and learns that Masquerade is transgender; shortly afterward, Masquerade learns that Fade is gay after the Fox reaches into Fade's mind. Fade promises not to tell anyone Masquerade's identity, and Masquerade threatens that if he does, he will expose Fade's sexuality in turn.

Wise Son embarrasses Boogieman by forcing him to reveal that he is white. This furthers dislike of Wise's leadership, particularly by Third Rail. Third Rail and Brickhouse enter a relationship and contemplated moving out on their own when Masquerade betrays the team. They choose to raid one last crackhouse to raise money. Kwai is shot during this raid and nearly dies, but manages to heal herself. As the rest of the Blood Syndicate make their way home, Masquerade steals some of their money and flees. This widens the growing rift in the team; Third Rail and Brick take the remaining money and leave.

=== Tensions ===
Kwai recovers from her injuries, but learns that she is on the last of a series of mystically granted lives. She travels to her home realm, Kwen Lun, the Wondrous Lands, in an attempt to gain at least one more life. During Kwai's troubles, Tech Nine seemingly returns from the dead.

Upon returning home, Kwai meets with her old friend, the Monkey King, and the two plead to her father, the Jade Emperor, for another life. The Emperor denies this request, declaring that she had grown too attached to the mortal world. He then sentences Kwai to death without reincarnation, stating that she had broken the blood contract between them by rebelling against him.

The Monkey King recruits most of the Syndicate to save Kwai, while Tech-9 and Flashback stay behind as backup. In the Kingdom of Ti Yu (Hell), Kwai is offered marriage to the Dog God to save her existence, but decides she cannot marry him and goes to meet the Grey Lady. Kwai then learns that her entire existence was nothing more than entertainment for the gods of the Wondrous Lands in the form of a never-ending battle against the Demon Fox. The Grey Lady offers Kwai another chance to live and marry the Dog God, but Kwai refuses, deciding that she would no longer allow those gods to control her existence, even if it meant her death.

=== Disbanding ===
After returning to Earth, the Blood Syndicate learns that the Demon Fox had dug up Tech-9's body and gave his essence to Masquerade. This enabled him to impersonate Tech so well that he actually believed he was him, and to wield his powers. Kwai destroys the Fox at the cost of reverting to a child form.

The Syndicate now knows that Masquerade was born female, and confronts him for his deception. He proclaims that, under his leadership, they became more efficient than ever before, and that with him, they could achieve their true potential as a team. However, Masquerade is unable to convince any of the Blood Syndicate members of his ideologies and leaves the team in disgrace. Wise Son disagrees with Masquerade's methods, but admits that he was right and that they "never lived up to the hype". He states that they all kept too many secrets from each other and that they fought each other more than their enemies. The team decides they were tired of the pain that they had endured and the constant violence around them and disbanded.

=== DC Universe ===
Following the death of Darkseid in Final Crisis, the space-time continuum is torn asunder, threatening the existence of both the Dakotaverse and the mainstream DC Universe. Dharma uses energy harnessed from Rift to merge the two universes, creating an entirely new continuity. Only Dharma, Icon, and Superman are aware that Dakota and its inhabitants were from a parallel universe. Holocaust, formerly a member of the Blood Syndicate, appears as an enemy of the Teen Titans.

=== Milestone Returns ===
The Blood Syndicate was revived as part of DC's 2021–2022 Milestone Returns initiative. The team received a new six-issue limited series, Blood Syndicate: Season One. The first issue was published in May 2022, with the series continuing through six issues before being collected in 2023. The new series retains the Blood Syndicate's basic concept as a group of Bang Babies associated with the streets of Dakota, while updating the team's relationships and circumstances for the modern Milestone continuity. Rather than presenting the members simply as a conventional superhero team, the series emphasizes their origins among rival gangs and the difficulties involved in transforming a group of people accustomed to violence and mistrust into a functioning alliance.

The modern Blood Syndicate continues to operate in the aftermath of the Big Bang, the event that created large numbers of super-powered individuals in Dakota. The team's history as a collection of people drawn from different factions gives it a markedly different dynamic from groups such as the Justice League. Internal disagreements, competing loyalties and differing ideas about how the Syndicate should use its powers remain important parts of the team's identity.

Blood Syndicate: Season One also expands the mythology surrounding the Bang Babies and the changing political and social landscape of Dakota. The series explores the consequences of people acquiring extraordinary abilities in a city already affected by poverty, organized crime and conflict. As a result, the Blood Syndicate's activities are presented as part of the larger social crisis created by the Big Bang rather than as an isolated series of supervillain battles. The revival was part of a broader attempt by Milestone to give the Dakota characters new stories while preserving the distinctive themes of the original line. DC launched Blood Syndicate: Season One alongside new series devoted to Static, Icon and Rocket and Hardware as part of the 2021–2022 Milestone revival.

The Blood Syndicate has subsequently been incorporated into the developing history of the modern DC Universe. The New History of the DC Universe: The Dakota Incident, published in February 2026, revisits the history of Dakota and establishes the place of the Milestone heroes within the broader DCU. Although Static, Icon, Rocket and Hardware are among the most prominent characters featured in the issue, the story establishes a wider history for Dakota's superhuman population and the events surrounding the city's transformation.

The Dakota Incident depicts a period in Dakota's history in which a murder escalates into a conflict involving the city's heroes and the U.S. government. The resulting confrontation places the city's superhuman population under extraordinary pressure and provides the historical background for the return of Dakota's heroes in the present day. DC characterizes the story as a pivotal piece of the modern Milestone/DCU continuity.

== Membership ==
- Aquamaria - Maria (last name unknown) was in the James River at the time of the Big Bang and gained the ability to manipulate and transform into water. She also has substantial control over water in all its forms, being able to create tsunamis and geysers, and shape near-freezing vapor into ice sculptures.
- Boogieman, or Boogie: Martin Berger is able to transform into a giant humanoid rat. He is also able to communicate with the hyper-intelligent rats of Dakota, even when untransformed. Berger joined the Syndicate during their attack on the S.Y.S.T.E.M. conspiracy.
- Brickhouse (or Brick): Marta (last name unknown) survived the Big Bang while pressed up against a brick wall; as a result, she took on its characteristics, becoming a 10-foot-tall, super-strong woman of living brick. Marta also sustained brain damage, giving her epilepsy and retrograde amnesia.
- DMZ: DMZ possesses superhuman strength and durability and is able to fly. DMZ rarely speaks (except during the Worlds Collide crossover, when he said the word "Damn"); nor does he ever take off his mask. Dwayne McDuffie stated that DMZ is a human who teamed up with a member of the D'amsi police force when she chased a criminal to Earth. He was severely wounded saving her life, so she used her technology to optimize him, unlocking his full human potential. She left the Earth to chase the villain as he healed, promising to return for him.
- Dogg: Originally Texador's/Tech-9's pet dog, Dogg gained human-level intelligence and speech while remaining physically unaltered.
- Fade: Carlos Quinones Jr. is the brother of Sara Quinones (Flashback). He can fly and pass through solid objects (quantum tunnelling), and frequently has difficulty becoming substantial. He is actually "spread out" over a three-second interval, and is thereby able to, for instance, punch someone and leave them unharmed until after he has left. He is a deeply closeted gay man, and was in love with Texador (Tech-9).
- Flashback: Sara Quinones is a sister of Carlos Quinones (Fade). Flashback can fly and can travel back in time three seconds, an ability she uses to change the past. She considers herself responsible for the welfare of the Syndicate as a whole because she has witnessed (and reversed) their deaths and severe injuries on multiple occasions. She is also a crack addict, partly because of the stress of having seen her friends die so many times, until Rocket intervenes.
- Holocaust (later Pyre): Leonard Smalls Jr. is the illegitimate son of Dakota mayor Thomasina Jefferson. A superhumanly strong pyrokinetic, Smalls left the Syndicate after a leadership struggle with Texador/Tech-9, and chose to abandon the small-scale world of gangs for the greater possibilities offered by organized crime. As an initiation ritual, he was obliged to surrender something of great value to him: his name, and the reputation that came with it. Unable to call himself Holocaust, Smalls renamed himself Pyre. As Pyre, Smalls formed a new Blood Syndicate and later reclaimed the name Holocaust.

Kwai, art by ChrisCross.

- Kwai: One of the two non-Bang Babies in the Blood Syndicate (DMZ being the other), Nina Lam is the 77th and last incarnation of a Chinese mystical being. Originally a 9-year-old girl, Lam was mystically transformed into an adult with pale skin, long hair, and pointed ears. After Brickhouse and Third Rail leave the Blood Syndicate, Kwai decides to leave and return to her homeland, the Kingdom of Kwen Lun. Ending up in the Kingdom of Ti Yu (hell), Kwai is offered marriage to the Dog God there to save her existence, but decides she cannot marry him. In a battle with the Blood Syndicate against the Demon Fox, Kwai and the Demon Fox apparently destroy each other, leaving Nina Lam's personality intact. Later in the Static Shock: Return of the Cool miniseries, Lam is shown meeting with the Syndicate and regains the ability to become Kwai.
- Masquerade: A shapeshifter able to assume the form of any animal (including humans), Masquerade is a transgender man. He kept his assigned gender (female) to himself, using his abilities to assume a male form. He fled the Syndicate after reflexively stealing several thousand dollars from them. A brief encounter later failed to convince him the Syndicate had changed their ways, and he would not be killed for his betrayal. He returned in the guise of a resurrected Rolando Texador (Tech-9), hoping to be accepted as their leader.
- Oro: Miguel Medina is a former police officer who survived the Big Bang as a member of the Riot Squad. After the Big-Bang, he was for a time a member of the Shadow Cabinet but was kicked out, and later framed for the murder of his ex-partner. He subsequently sought refuge with the Syndicate and helped protect their territory. He can fly, project energy blasts and produce blinding visual displays.

Tech 9, art by ChrisCross.

- Tech-9 (or Tech): Rolando Texador, formerly leader of the Force Syndicate, had the ability of "talismanic telekinesis", making him able to shoot endless quantities of bullets from any and all guns, with perfect accuracy. He could also materialize guns in his hands; his favored was the Tech-9 semi-automatic handgun, which he takes his name from. Charismatic and with military training, he masterminded the Syndicate's formation and led them in their raids on crackhouses, but his flesh spontaneously melted off his bones when his superpower destabilized.
- Third Rail: The son of Korean immigrants, Pui Chung is able to absorb any form of energy and use it to grow in size and strength.
- Wise Son (or Wise): Hannibal White, leader of the Syndicate after Texador's death and a Black Muslim, is invulnerable and has superhuman strength. He has also shown the ability to resist mental manipulation, and to survive the draining of large quantities of life force. He is the father of Edmund White, and has sole custody of him.

== Other characters ==
- Babe is a bodyguard of the House of L'Amour beauty salon, and possibly lover to its transvestite beautician. As a Bang Baby, he resembles a humanoid blue ox.
- Bubbasaur/Bubbasaurus: Bubba Brown is able to turn into a dinosaur-like creature resembling a Carnotaurus. Introduced in issue #11 as a spurned student going after a high school principal—Carlos Quinones Sr. (Fade's father). Though Bubba was seemingly killed in a fight with Fade, he was picked up by Mom's S.Y.S.T.E.M. troops and taken to Garden Station. He joins in an escape attempt by the other prisoners.
- Demon Fox is a Chinese mystical vampire who first appears in issue #6. John Wing, leader of the Demon Fox Tong, awakened it after killing his wife, in response to being humiliated by the Blood Syndicate after failing to kill them. The Demon Fox finally strikes in issues #7 and 8 as it tears apart the Blood Syndicate, bringing up each member's darkest secrets. After defeating the group, the Demon Fox kills Wing after granting his wish. Afterward, it is defeated by a newly transformed Kwai (previously Nina Lam) who comes to the rescue of the Blood Syndicate. The Demon Fox aided Masquerade in imitating Tech-9, by giving Masquerade some of Tech-9's essence so she can assume leadership of the Blood Syndicate. In issue #35, "The Beginning of the End" - in an all-out battle between the Demon Fox and Masquerade vs the Blood Syndicate - Kwai and the Demon Fox destroy each other.
- Edmund and Cornelia are Wise Son's illegitimate son and younger sister, respectively. They frequently visit him at the factory the Blood Syndicate call home, regardless of the constant danger they place themselves in. The two children have a teleportational ability; they can write a location or person on a mirror and enter, encountering what they desire.
- Mom is the head of the Amber Cell of the S.Y.S.T.E.M./Coalition and heading the research into creating custom-made Bang-Babies and controlling them. Mom runs the Garden Station, the command center for the Amber sector of S.Y.S.T.E.M.
- Templo: Juan Templo is a telekinetic and one of the founding Blood Syndicate members.
- White Roaches and the Rats are two groups of vermin who acquired human characteristics during the Big Bang. They are large, intelligent, and (especially in the case of the White Roaches) hostile.

== In other media ==
- Characters based on Blood Syndicate members appear in Static Shock:
  - Aquamaria appears in the episodes "Bad Stretch" and "Wet and Wild", voiced by Erika Velez in the former and Yeni Álvarez in the latter. This version left her family to join Ebon's Meta-Breed. After being defeated by Static and arrested by authorities, she eventually and voluntarily undergoes experimentation to remove her powers and rejoin her family.
  - Brickhouse, Tech, and Fade appear in the episode "Army of Darkness", with Brickhouse voiced by Dawnn Lewis and Tech and Fade both voiced by Freddy Rodriguez. This version of the trio are members of the Night-Breed, photosensitive Bang Babies who are forced to live underground during the day. Additionally, Brickhouse lacks brain damage while Tech possesses superhuman intelligence.
- Holocaust appears in Young Justice, voiced by Zeno Robinson. This version is a member of Onslaught.
