= Robert L. Washington III =

- Born: Robert Lee Washington III; November 29, 1964 Detroit, Michigan, US
- Died: June 7, 2012 (aged 47) Queens, New York, New York, U.S.
- Area: Writer
- Notable works: Static, Shadow Cabinet

Robert Lee Washington III (November 29, 1964 – June 7, 2012) was an American writer of comic books, known for writing Static (later adapted for a successful animated television series) and the Shadow Cabinet, both for Milestone Media.

== Biography ==
Washington was born and raised in Detroit, Michigan. He graduated from Roeper High School. Following graduation, he briefly attended New York University, although he never graduated.

In the early 1990s, along with Dwayne McDuffie and John Paul Leon, he worked as a writer on Static, the comic book based on an African American teenage superhero of the same name, part of the Milestone imprint published by DC Comics. His 18-issue initial run writing the series received critical praise for its characterization of the protagonist. Subsequently, he contributed to several additional comic books (mostly published by DC), including co-creating Shadow Cabinet and writing for Extreme Justice, The Batman Chronicles, JLA Secret Files, and (for Acclaim Comics) Ninjak.

Following a contraction of the comic-book-publishing industry in the mid-1990s, Washington had difficulties finding work as a writer. He was employed sporadically in unrelated jobs and had been homeless several times. During this period, Washington received financial assistance from the Hero Initiative, a not-for-profit corporation that provides financial assistance for comic book creators.

On June 6, 2012, while working for an online retailer in Long Island City, New York, Washington suffered a cardiac arrest. He was taken to Mount Sinai Hospital in Queens, and the next day he suffered two additional cardiac arrests and died. As Washington was indigent at the time of his death, once again The Hero Initiative created a fund-raising appeal to pay for Washington's funeral and burial services.
