= Milestone Media =

Imprint of DC Comics

Milestone Media Company LLC
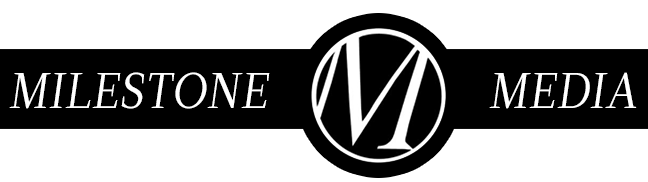
- Parent company: DC Comics
- Founded: 1993; 33 years ago (original); 2015; 11 years ago (relaunch)
- Founder: Dwayne McDuffie; Denys Cowan; Michael Davis; Derek T. Dingle
- Defunct: 2008; 18 years ago (original)
- Country of origin: United States
- Headquarters location: New York City
- Publication types: Comic books
- Fiction genres: Superhero
- Imprints: Earth M
- Owner: Skydance Corporation
- Official website: milestone.media

Milestone Media Company LLC is the media company which created the Milestone Comics line, which were published and distributed by DC Comics. Milestone Media created the source material that was adapted as the Static Shock animated series. The company was founded in 1993 by a coalition of African-American artists and writers, consisting of Dwayne McDuffie, Denys Cowan, Michael Davis, Derek T. Dingle and Christopher Priest. The founders felt that minorities were severely underrepresented in American comics and wished to address this.

== History ==
=== Development ===
Christopher Priest participated in the early planning stages of Milestone Media, and was originally slated to become the editor-in-chief of the new company, but left the endeavor for personal reasons before any of Milestone's titles were published. Michael Davis left Milestone in 1995, after the imprint had launched, to become president of the new company Motown Animation & Filmworks. Denys Cowan soon joined him to serve as editor-in-chief.

All Milestone Media titles were set in a continuity dubbed the "Dakotaverse", referring to the fictional midwestern city of Dakota City in which most of the early Milestone stories were set. Before any titles were published, an extensive "bible" was created by Dwayne McDuffie and other early creators which provided back-story and information on all of the original Dakotaverse characters, as well as detailed information about the history and geography of Dakota. Cowan produced the original character sketches that served as a guide for the other artists.

=== Publishing deal ===
Although Milestone comics were published through DC Comics, they did not fall under DC Comics' editorial control; DC retained only the right not to publish any material they objected to. Milestone Media retained the copyright of their properties and had the final say on all merchandising and licensing deals pertaining to them. In essence, DC licensed the characters, editorial services, and creative content of the Milestone books for an annual fee and a share of the profits. Dwayne McDuffie said that DC held up this agreement even though some of Milestone's storylines made them "very uncomfortable" as they were from perspectives that DC were not used to. The biggest conflict they had was when issue #25 of Static showed the hero kissing his girlfriend on a bed, with unopened condoms visible. DC did not want to publish this cover on grounds that it was using sex to sell comics; Milestone covered most of the image as a compromise. McDuffie believed it made DC uncomfortable because it was specifically "black sexuality", noting that the man who communicated DC's concerns at the time was standing in front of a copy of Legionnaires #16, the cover of which depicts Dream Girl in a sexually suggestive manner.

=== Dakotaverse ===
In 1993, Milestone Media launched its first four titles: Hardware, Icon, Blood Syndicate and Static. At the same time, SkyBox and DC issued a trading card series, Milestone: The Dakota Universe (1993).

A year later, Milestone Media published its first company-wide crossover, Shadow War, which spawned two more titles: Shadow Cabinet and Xombi. Another ongoing series, Kobalt, was introduced later. Milestone also participated in an intercompany crossover with DC, called "Worlds Collide" in which Metropolis-based superheroes from the DC Universe and Dakota-based superheroes from the Dakotaverse interacted temporarily. Milestone had several advantages in its publishing efforts: their books were distributed and marketed by one of the "Big Two" comic book publishers; the comics industry had experienced remarkable increases in sales in preceding years; they featured the work of several well-known and critically acclaimed creators; they used a coloring process that gave their books a distinctive look, and they had the potential to appeal to an audience that was not being targeted by other publishers.

They also suffered from several disadvantages: the comics market was experiencing a glut of "new universes" as several other publishers launched superhero lines around the same time (a slump would start in 1993 and a market crash in 1994), and a significant number of retailers and readers perceived the Milestone books to be "comics for blacks" and assumed they would not interest non-African-American readers. The books received limited exposure beyond existing comics-shop customers, the coloring process added slightly to the cover price of their books, and overall comics sales had peaked around the time of Milestone's launch and declined dramatically in the years that followed. Initial sales, however, were found to be decent, albeit not as high as other companies. The perception of "comics for blacks" would be used by industry insiders to justify these early sales issues, ignoring the existence of the glut; few people at the time wanted to believe that the market conditions might be unsound and excuses were needed for why newer companies were struggling.

Milestone cancelled several of its lower-selling series in 1995 and 1996, and aborted plans for several mini-series. Heroes, a new team book featuring Static and several of its more popular second-tier characters, was launched, but failed to sell well enough to justify an ongoing series. Milestone shut down its comic book division in 1997, with some of the remaining ongoing series discontinued in mid-story. It became primarily a licensing company, focusing on the Emmy Award and Humanitas Prize-winning animated series Static Shock.

In 2010, DC released a limited series titled Milestone Forever. Taking place in the original Milestone Universe, it detailed the final fate of several of Dakota's heroes and revealed the events that led to its earlier merger into the DC Universe.

=== DC Universe ===
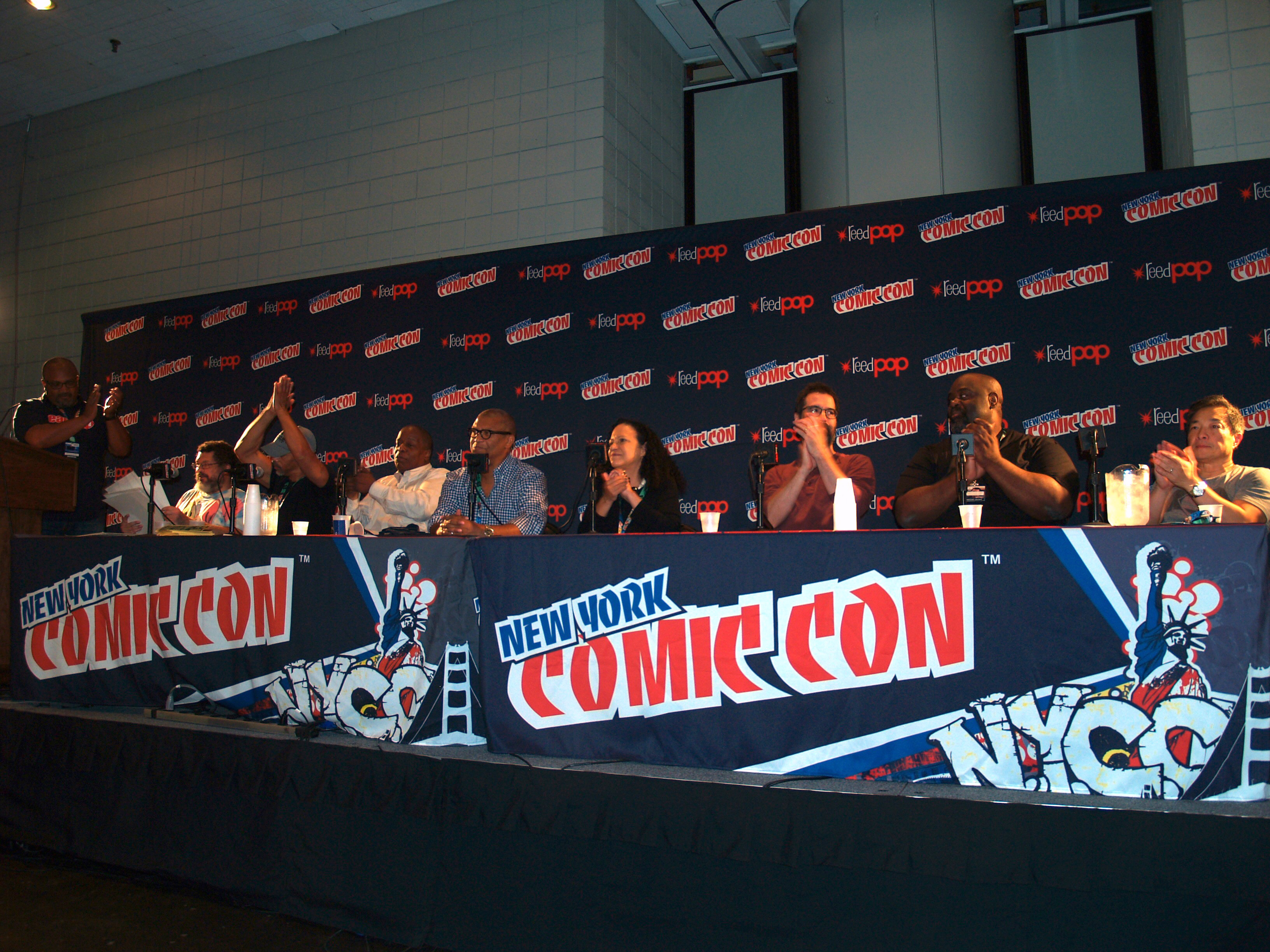
The "Return to the Dakota Universe" panel at the 2017 New York Comic Con. From left to right: DC Vice President of Creative Affairs Dan Evans (at the podium), Kyle Baker, Denys Cowan, Derek T. Dingle, Reginald Hudlin, Alice Randall, Greg Pak, Ken Lashley, and Jim Lee. Close-ups of the panelists can be found here.

Since 2008, the Milestone Universe and characters were revived and merged into the DC Universe properly. Examples of the integration included Static joining the Teen Titans; Static, Icon, Rocket and Hardware appearing in the Young Justice TV series; various character appearances in The Brave and the Bold; and the Shadow Cabinet appearing in Justice League of America. An ongoing series starring Static was included in the initial 2011 launch of The New 52, but was cancelled after eight issues.

=== Milestone Returns ===
In a January 2015 interview, writer Reginald Hudlin discussed a relaunch of Milestone Media Group, along with surviving co-founders Denys Cowan and Derek Dingle. The following July, DC Comics announced the creation of "Earth-M" within the DC Comics multiverse, which would be home to the earlier Milestone characters as well as new ones, and that one or two Earth M imprint titles would be published annually, as well as miniseries and one-shots. No further developments took place until October 2017, when it was revealed that Milestone would be returning in 2018 with five titles, including Milestone (featuring Icon and Rocket), a new Static series, Duo (based on the character Xombi), and two other new titles: Earth-M and Love Army. Charlotte Fullerton, Dwayne McDuffie's widow who inherited his 50% share in the original Milestone Media company, sued in August 2017 over being excluded from the revived company despite the new Milestone taking over the original's Milestone IPs.

The line was revived in Milestone Returns #0 in September 2020.

=== New History, DC K.O. and New Titans ===
Following the appearance of many Milestone characters in the limited series New History of the DC Universe, DC announced a one-shot spinoff of the series called New History of the DC Universe: The Dakota Incident in November 2025. The comic, which was released in February 2026 in celebration of Black History Month, told a new and updated history for Dakota and its superpowered characters in the main DC continuity. The comic sold well and received a second printing. The ending of this issue, combined with an appearance from Static in DC K.O., implied that the character would return. This was confirmed with the announcement that Static would return to the Teen Titans in New Titans #38, which released in August 2026.

== Staff ==
Milestone's founders were joined in the company's formative years by young professionals who formed the early production team for the startup company. The first two non-founder employees of Milestone were Matt Wayne, a script and comic writer who became editor, then managing editor; and Christine Gilliam, head of corporate communications. By January 1993, Noelle Giddings, who had previously worked in comics as a colorist, became Milestone's color editor, supervising the line's painted art; and Joe James, an experienced graphic designer, served as designer and creative associate. Later the production staff would expand to include Erica Helene, Jason Medley, Jacqueline Ching, Joe Daniello, Andrew Burrell, Marcus Bennett, and Michelline Hess. Allen Epps was the CFO and Bob Stein was the legal counsel.

In addition to using the talents of established creative professionals such as Dwayne McDuffie, Denys Cowan, M. D. Bright, Madeleine Blaustein, and Mike Gustovich, Milestone hired new talent, many of whom went on to successful careers. Among them are John Paul Leon, Chris Sotomayor, Christopher Williams (aka ChrisCross), Ivan Velez Jr., Shawn Martinbrough, Tommy Lee Edwards, Jason Scott Jones (aka J.Scott.J), Prentis Rollins, J. H. Williams III, Humberto Ramos, John Rozum, Eric Battle, Joseph Illidge, Jamal Igle, Chris Batista, Harvey Richards, and Robert L. Washington III.

== Publications ==
Comic titles published by Milestone include:

=== Monthly series ===
- Hardware – 50 issues. A trade paperback Hardware: The Man in the Machine was published in 2010, collecting issues #1–8.
- Blood Syndicate – 35 issues
- Icon – 42 issues. The first eight issues were collected in the trade paperback, Icon: A Hero's Welcome in 1996, and a second edition was released in 2009. The issues that feature Buck Wild, Icon's return to his home planet, and the rampage of Icon's enemy Oblivion have been collected as Icon: Mothership Connection in 2010, collecting issues #13, 19–22, 24–26 and 30.
- Static – 45 issues. The first four issues were collected in a graphic novel: Static Shock: Trial by Fire in 2000 and a new mini-series was published in 2001 called Static Shock: The Rebirth of the Cool, running for four issues.
- Shadow Cabinet – 18 issues
- Xombi – 22 issues. Although it was completed at the time, the Xombi Hanukkah Special would only be published in Milestone Compendium Five.
- Kobalt – 16 issues
- Heroes – 6 issues

=== Miniseries ===
- Deathwish – 4 issues (Hardware spin-off)
- My Name Is Holocaust – 5 issues (Blood Syndicate spin-off)
- Static Shock: Rebirth of the Cool – 4 issues
- Wise Son: The White Wolf – 4 issues (Blood Syndicate spin-off)

=== Crossovers ===
- Shadow War - company-wide crossover, it involved all comics, including the newly premiered Xombi and Shadow Cabinet (January 1994).
- Worlds Collide – fourteen part crossover with Blood Syndicate, Hardware, Icon, Static, and DC's Steel, Superman: The Man of Steel, and Superboy (July–August 1994).
- Long Hot Summer - company-wide crossover: three issues of the comic by the same title, plus tie-ins in every Milestone title (July–September 1995).

=== Milestone Returns ===
- Milestone Returns #0: Infinite Edition – 1 issue. Includes The Big Bang and Milestone Returns: Fandome Preview.
- Static: Season One – 6 issues
- Icon and Rocket: Season One – 6 issues
- Hardware: Season One – 6 issues
- Blood Syndicate: Season One – 6 issues
- DUO – 6 issues
- Icon vs. Hardware – 5 issues

== Collected editions ==
- Icon: A Hero's Welcome - collects Icon #1–8, 192 pages, March 1997, 978-1563893391
- Static Shock: Trial by Fire - collects Static #1-4, 104 pages, October 2000, 978-1563897467
- Static Shock: The Rebirth of the Cool - collects Static #1-4 and Static Shock: The Rebirth of the Cool #1-4, 192 pages, 2001, 978-1401222628
- Hardware: The Man in the Machine - collects Hardware #1-8, 192 pages, March 2010, 978-1401225988
- Icon: The Mothership Connection - collects Icon #13, 19-22, 24-26, 30; 256 pages, June 2010, 978-1401227111
- Static: Season One - collects #1-6; 200 pages, June 2022, 978-1779514219
- Icon & Rocket: Season One - collects #1-6; 208 pages, August 2022, 978-1779515520
- Hardware: Season One - collects #1-6 and Milestone Returns: Infinite Edition #0; 192 pages, October 2022, 978-1779515131
- DUO - collects #1-6; 160 pages; 160 pages, April 2023, 978-1779518453
- Blood Syndicate: Season One - collects #1-6; 168 pages, May 2023, 978-1779518439
- DC Finest: Static: Playing with Fire - collects Static #1-15, Superman: The Man of Steel #36, Superboy #7, Worlds Collide #1, October 2025, 978-1799502944

=== Compendiums ===
- Milestone Compendium One - collects Blood Syndicate #1-12, Hardware #1-12, Icon #1-10, Shadow Cabinet #0, Static #1-8, Xombi #0-11; 1,320 pages, February 2022, 978-1779513106
- Milestone Compendium Two - collects Blood Syndicate #13-23, Hardware #13-21, Icon #11-21, Shadow Cabinet #1-4, Static #9-20, Steel #6-7, Superboy #6-7, Superman: The Man of Steel #35-36, Worlds Collide #1; 1,320 pages, January 2023, 978-1779514950
- Milestone Compendium Three - collects Blood Syndicate #24-27, Hardware #22-28, Icon #22-27, Shadow Cabinet #5-13, Static #21-25, Deathwish #1-4, Kobalt #1-14; 1,208 pages, February 2024, 978-1779526090
- Milestone Compendium Four - collects Blood Syndicate #28-32, Hardware #29-38, Icon #28-37, Kobalt #15-16, Shadow Cabinet #14-17, Static #26-31, Xombi #12-21, My Name Is Holocaust #1-5, The Long, Hot Summer #1-3; 1,304 pages, February 2025, 978-1799500261
- Milestone Compendium Five - collects Blood Syndicate #33-35; Hardware #39-50; Icon #38-42; Static #32-45; Wise Son: The White Wolf #1-4; Heroes #1-6; Static Shock!: Rebirth of the Cool #1-4; Milestone Forever #1-2; Xombi Hanukkah Special; 1,344 pages, July 2026, 978-1799508328

== In other media ==
=== Television ===
- Static appears as the main character in the animated series Static Shock, which ran for four seasons on Kids' WB.
- Milestone Comics characters Icon, Rocket, Hardware, Static, and Holocaust appear in Young Justice.

=== Video games ===
- Static was featured as a member of the Teen Titans in DC Universe Online.
- Static was added as a playable character, unlocked through a challenge in April 2015, in the mobile version of Injustice: Gods Among Us.
- Rocket appears as an unlockable character in Young Justice: Legacy.
