= Denys Cowan =

American comics artist and producer (born 1961)

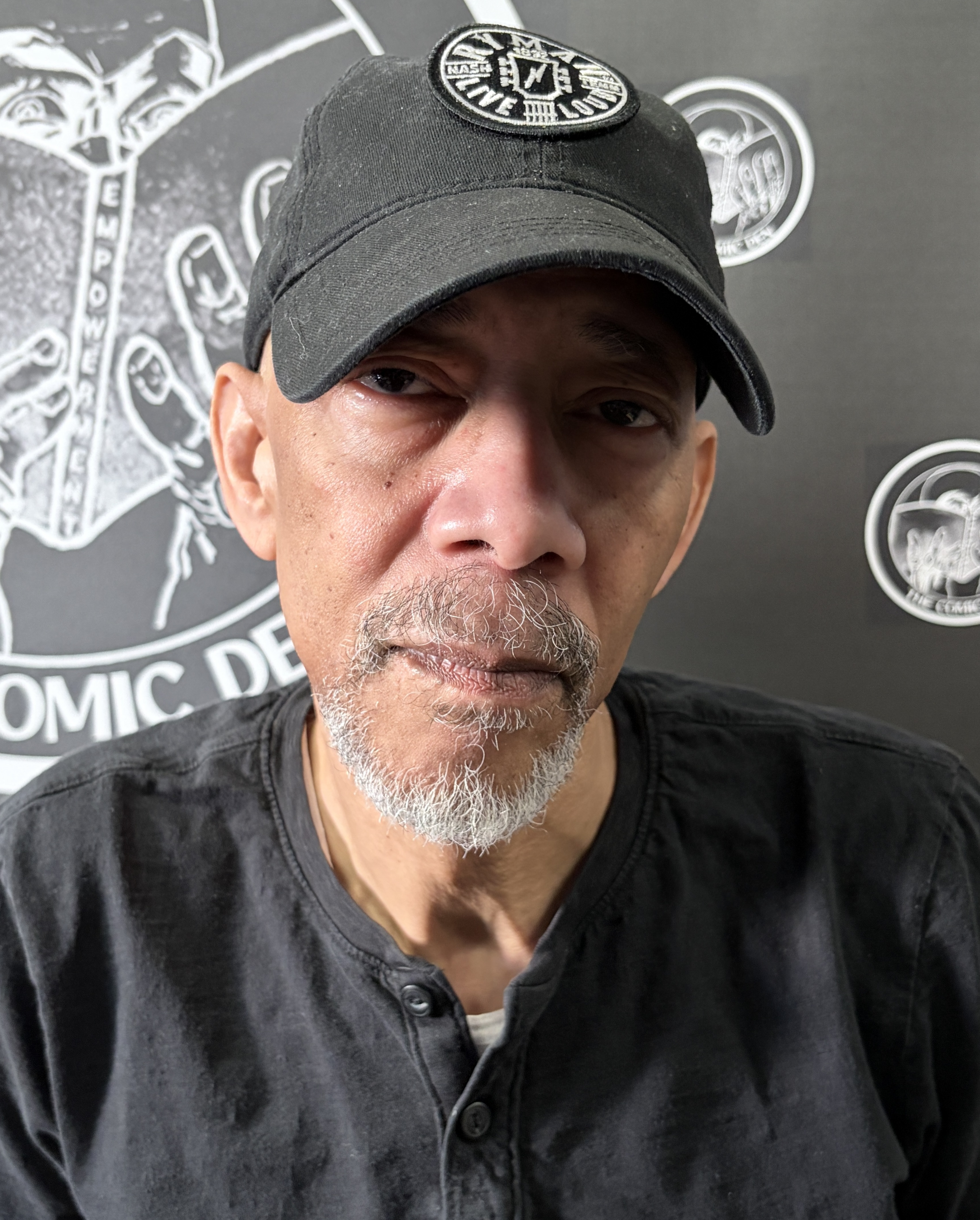
- Cowan at The Comic Den in 2026
- Born: Denys Cowan; January 30, 1961 (age 65)
- Areas: Penciller, inker
- Notable works: Black Panther; Dominique Laveau, Voodoo Child; Milestone Media; Power Man and Iron Fist; The Question

Denys Cowan (/ˈkaʊən/; born January 30, 1961) is an American comics artist, television producer, media executive and one of the co-founders of Milestone Media.

== Early life ==
Denys Cowan was first inspired by superheroes as a child from reruns of the 1950s TV show Adventures of Superman with George Reeves. He did not yet know what a comic book was, and would not learn about them until the third grade. After Cowan's mother died, he moved in with his grandparents, and attended school in that district, where he met a future fellow comics creator, Derek Dingle, who drew comics with his brother. Dingle showed Cowan his first comic book, an issue of Jack Kirby's New Gods. Cowan attended the High School of Art and Design in New York City. One day in the school lunchroom, the 14-year-old Cowan met someone who worked for artist and Deathlok creator Rich Buckler. This led Cowan to pay a visit one day after school to Buckler's studio, where Buckler hired Cowan as his assistant. For a year, Cowan performed a number of tasks, including running errands, cleaning the studio, looking up references, for which Buckler paid him in the music albums that he had played in his studio, which increased Cowan's appreciation for music.

== Career ==
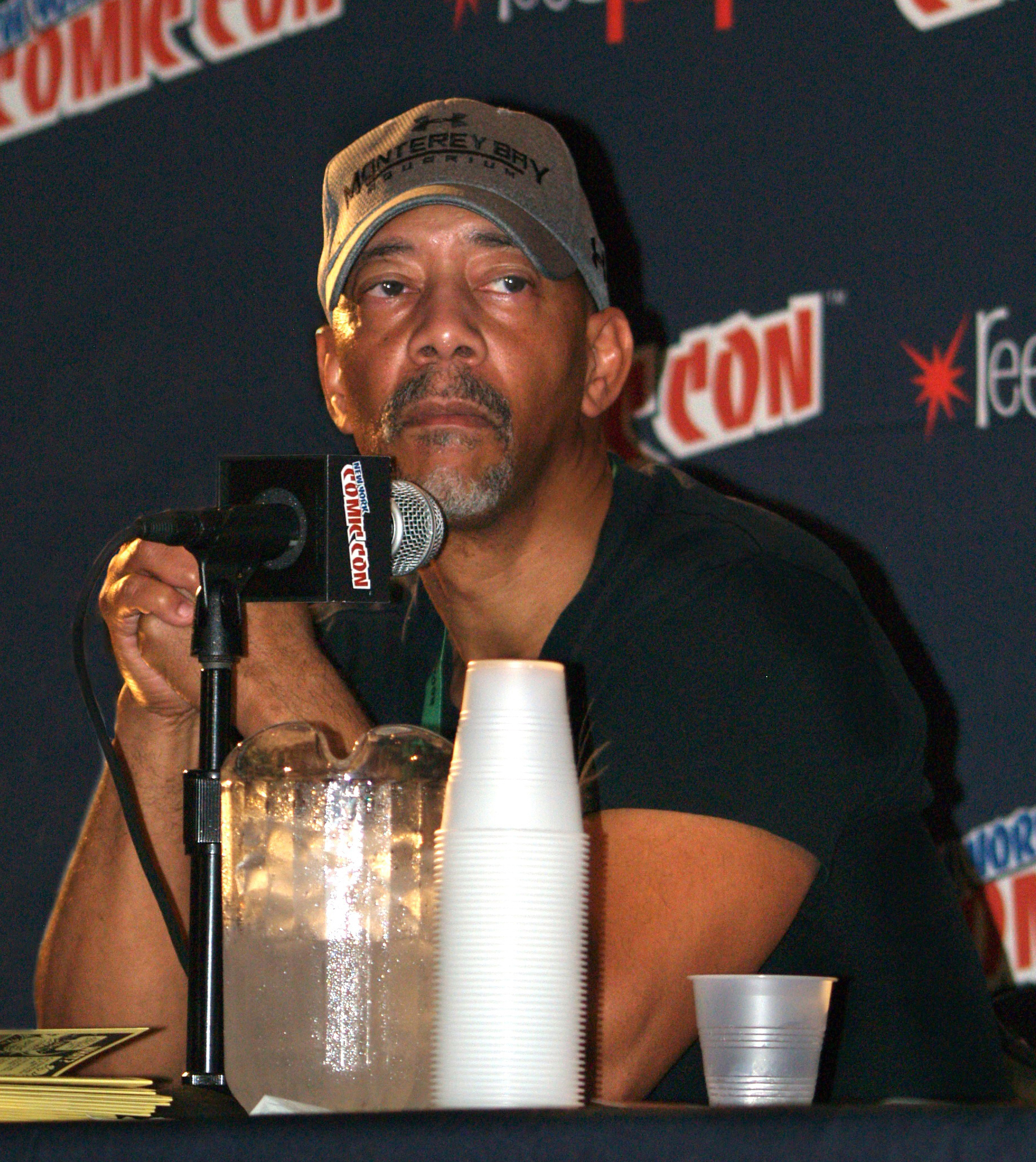
Cowan at the 2017 New York Comic Con

Cowan's first published comics work was a three-page story in Weird War Tales #93 (Nov. 1980) for DC Comics. He was one of the contributors to the DC Challenge limited series in 1986. Cowan gained prominence as the primary artist on The Question, a comic book series written by Dennis O'Neil and published by DC beginning in February 1987. His other comics credits include the Batman story arc "Blind Justice" in Detective Comics #598–600 (March–May 1989) with writer Sam Hamm, which introduced the character Henri Ducard. Cowan was the penciller on the latter half of the 1990 Deathlok miniseries, published by Marvel Comics, which was written by Dwayne McDuffie and Gregory Wright as well as on the subsequent regular title of the same name.

Cowan and writer Dwayne McDuffie collaborated on a Prince comic book in 1991. Cowan co-founded Milestone Media in 1993 with McDuffie, Michael Davis, and Derek Dingle, and later worked as a producer on Static Shock, an animated series based on Milestone character Static.

As senior vice president of animation at BET, Cowan was responsible for the creation, development and production of animated programming for the entire network. This included the development and production of the premiere season of The Boondocks.

Serving as senior vice President of Motown Animation and Filmworks, he created and developed a number of shows with Fox, ABC, Disney, and Nickelodeon.

Cowan drew the cover art of the GZA/Genius of the Wu-Tang Clan's album Liquid Swords.

== Awards ==
Cowan and inker Rick Magyar were nominated for an Eisner Award as "Best Art Team" in both 1988 and 1989 for their work on The Question.

Cowan received an Inkpot Award at San Diego Comic-Con in 2013.

In 2026, Cowan was selected for inclusion in the Eisner Hall of Fame.

== Bibliography ==
An example of Cowan's artwork: The Question #34 (January 1990); DC Comics.

=== Regular penciller ===
- Peter Parker, The Spectacular Spider-Man #49–51 (Marvel Comics, December 1980 – February 1981) – (White Tiger backup)
- Superman #357–358 (DC Comics, March–April 1981) – (Superman 2020 backup)
- The Flash #297–299 (DC Comics, May–July 1981) – (Firestorm backup)
- The Flash #301–302 (DC Comics, September–October 1981) – (Firestorm backup)
- Power Man and Iron Fist #80–84, #86–90, #92–93 (Marvel Comics, April–August 1982, October 1982 – February 1983, October 1982 – February 1983)
- The Vigilante #24–26 (DC Comics, December 1985 – February 1986) – (backup)
- Teen Titans Spotlight #1–2 (DC Comics, August–September 1986) – (Starfire story)
- The Question #1–19, #21–36 (DC Comics, February 1987 – August 1988, November 1988 – April 1990)
- The Question Annual #1–2 (DC Comics, 1987–1988)
- Doctor Zero #1–4 (Marvel Comics/Epic, April–October 1988)
- Black Panther vol. 2 #1–4 (Marvel Comics, July–October 1988) – (limited series)
- Detective Comics #598–600 (DC Comics, March–May 1989)
- The Question Quarterly #1–5 (DC Comics, Autumn 1990–Spring 1992)
- Deathlok #3–4 (Marvel Comics, September–October 1990) – (limited series)
- Green Arrow #39, #41–43 (DC Comics, November 1990, December 1990 – February 1991)
- Nightcat #1 (Marvel Comics, April 1991) – (one-shot)
- Green Arrow #46–48 (DC Comics, May–June 1991)
- Prince: Alter Ego (DC Comics/Piranha Music,1991) – (one-shot)
- Deathlok vol. 2 #1–7, #9–13, #15 (Marvel Comics, July 1991 – January 1992, March–July 1992, September 1992)
- Deathlok Annual #1 (Marvel Comics, 1992) – (pencils and inks)
- Moon Knight: Divided We Fall (Marvel Comics, 1992) – (one-shot)
- Lobo: Blazing Chain of Love #1 (DC Comics, September 1992)
- Hardware #1–7, #11, #13, #16–18 (DC Comics/Milestone, April 1993 – September 1993, January 1994, March 1994, June–August 1994)
- Xombi #0 (DC Comics/Milestone, January 1994)
- Frank #1–2, #4 (Harvey Comics, March–May 1994, July 1994) – (mini-series)
- Long Hot Summer #1–3 (DC Comics/Milestone, July–September 1995) – (mini-series)
- Batman: The Ultimate Evil #1–2 (DC Comics, December 1995)
- Total Justice #1–3 (DC Comics, October–November 1996) – (mini-series)
- Steel #34–52 (DC Comics, January 1997 – July 1998)
- "Waking Nightmare!" All-Star Comics 80-Page Giant #1 (DC Comics, September 1998) – (Justice Society of America story)
- Fight for Tomorrow #1–6 (DC Comics/Vertigo, November 2002 – April 2003)
- Black Panther/Captain America: Flags of Our Fathers #1–4 (Marvel Comics, Jun–Sep 2010)
- Dominique Laveau: Voodoo Child #1–7 (DC Comics/Vertigo, May 2012 – November 2012)
- Convergence: Batman and Robin #1–2 (DC Comics, June 2015 – July 2015)
- Convergence Detective Comics #1–2 (DC Comics, June 2015 – July 2015)
- The Black Racer and Shilo Norman Special #1 (DC Comics, October 2017)
- Black Lightning / Hong Kong Phooey #1 (DC Comics, July 2018)

=== Fill-in penciller ===
- "Ultimate Weapon." Weird War Tales #93 (DC Comics, November 1980)
- "Diplomatic Immunity." Mystery in Space #115 (DC Comics, January 1981)
- "Batman's Rogues Gallery." The Best of DC #14 (DC Comics, July 1981)
- "The Idol of Millions." House of Mystery #297 (DC Comics, October 1981)
- "Bushido." Unknown Soldier #256 (DC Comics, October 1981)
- "The Worship of False Idols." Moon Knight #17 (Marvel Comics, March 1982) – (Marc Spector backup)
- Flash Force 2000 (DC Comics, November 1984) – (insert in various comic books)1984)
- Marvel Age #20 (Marvel Comics, November 1984)
- "Final Transactions, Part 3: Threats and Promises.Sabre #12 (Eclipse Comics, January 1985) – (Crimson Dawn backup)
- Vigilante Annual #1 (DC Comics, 1985)
- The Vigilante #19 (DC Comics, July 1985)
- Heroes Against Hunger #1 (DC Comics, January 1986) – (two pages)
- DC Comics Presents #90 (DC Comics, February 1986)
- The Vigilante #27 (DC Comics, March 1986)
- 'Mazing Man #5 (DC Comics, May 1986) – (three pages)
- Batman Annual #10 (DC Comics, 1986)
- DC Challenge #12 (DC Comics, October 1986) – (four pages)
- V #17–18 (DC Comics, June–July 1986)
- The Vigilante #36 (DC Comics, December 1986)
- Batman #403 (DC Comics, January 1987)
- Electric Warrior #9 (DC Comics, January 1987) – (backup)
- Marvel Age Annual #4 (Marvel Comics, January 1988)
- Sable #5 (First Comics, July 1988)
- Iron Man #241 (Marvel Comics, April 1989)
- The Shadow Strikes #3 (DC Comics, November 1989)
- Clive Barker's Hellraiser #9 (Marvel Comics/Epic,1991)
- Clive Barker's Hellraiser #12 (Marvel Comics/Epic,1992) – (pencils, inks, and colors)
- "The Big Applesauce." Marvel Fanfare #60 (Marvel Comics, January 1992) – (Black Panther story)
- Static #14 (DC Comics/Milestone, August 1994)
- Hardware #25 (DC Comics/Milestone, March 1995)
- Hardware #32 (DC Comics/Milestone, October 1995)
- Blood Syndicate #32 (DC Comics/Milestone, November 1995)
- Hardware #36 (DC Comics/Milestone, February 1996)
- Superman: The Man of Steel #54 (DC Comics, March 1996)
- Wolverine vol. 2 #123–124 (Marvel Comics, April–May 1998)
- "Outsiders." The Rampaging Hulk vol. 2 #1 (Marvel Comics, August 1998)
- Silver Surfer vol. 3 #143 (Marvel Comics, September 1998)
- Silver Surfer vol. 3 #146 (Marvel Comics, November 1998)

Preceded by Kerry Gammill	Power Man and Iron Fist penciller 1982–1983	Succeeded by Ernie Chan
Preceded by Dan Reed (in 1981)	The Question penciller 1987–1992	Succeeded by Rick Burchett (in 1995)
Preceded by n/a	Doctor Zero penciller 1988	Succeeded by Dan Spiegle
Preceded by Jerry Bingham (in 1980)	Black Panther penciller 1988	Succeeded by Dwayne Turner (in 1991)
Preceded by Eduardo Barreto	Detective Comics penciller 1989	Succeeded by Norm Breyfogle
Preceded by Jackson Guice	Deathlok penciller 1990–1992	Succeeded by Walter McDaniel
Preceded by n/a	Hardware penciller 1993–1994	Succeeded by Humberto Ramos
Preceded by Jim Aparo	Steel penciller 1997–1998	Succeeded by n/a
