= Dwayne McDuffie =

American comic book and television writer (1962–2011)

- McDuffie in the late 1980s or early 1990s
- Born: Dwayne Glenn McDuffie; February 20, 1962 Detroit, Michigan, U.S.
- Died: February 21, 2011 (aged 49) Burbank, California, U.S.
- Areas: Writer, producer, editor
- Notable works: Comics: Damage Control, Milestone Media, Static; TV: Static Shock, Justice League Unlimited, Ben 10: Alien Force, Ben 10: Ultimate Alien, All-Star Superman
- Spouses: Patricia Younger (m. 1990; div. 1991) Charlotte Fullerton (m. 2009)
- Relatives: Keegan-Michael Key (half-brother)

Dwayne Glenn McDuffie (February 20, 1962 – February 21, 2011) was an American writer of comic books and television. He co-founded the pioneering minority-owned-and-operated comic book company Milestone Media, which focused on underrepresented minorities in American comics, creating and co-creating characters such as Icon, Rocket, Static, and Hardware. McDuffie was also a writer and producer for animated series such as Static Shock (based on the Static character), Justice League Unlimited and the Ben 10 sequels, Alien Force and Ultimate Alien.

McDuffie earned three Eisner Award nominations for his work in comics.

== Early life and education ==
McDuffie was born and raised in Detroit, Michigan, the son of Leroy McDuffie and Edna (née Hawkins) McDuffie Gardner. He attended and graduated from the Roeper School, a school for gifted children in Bloomfield Hills, Michigan, in 1980. One of McDuffie's first introductions to comics was when he learned of the character Black Panther at the age of 11. He described the character as not being "anyone's sidekick", but "his own hero, his own man", saying that "In the space of 15 pages, black people moved from invisible to inevitable." Of other Black characters in comics, he later said:

You only had two types of characters available for children. You had the stupid angry brute and the he's-smart-but-he's-black characters. And they were all colored either this Hershey-bar shade of brown, a sickly looking gray or purple. I've never seen anyone that's gray or purple before in my life. There was no diversity and almost no accuracy among the characters of color at all.

In 1983, McDuffie graduated with a bachelor's degree in English from the University of Michigan, followed by a master's degree in physics. He then moved to New York to attend film school at New York University's Tisch School of the Arts. While McDuffie was working as a copy editor at the business magazine Investment Dealers' Digest, a friend got him an interview for an assistant editor position at Marvel Comics.

After McDuffie's death, comedian Keegan-Michael Key discovered that he and McDuffie were biological half-brothers, having the same father.

== Career ==
=== Marvel and Milestone ===
Going on staff at Marvel as editor Bob Budiansky's assistant on special projects, McDuffie helped develop the company's first superhero trading cards. He also scripted stories for Marvel. His first major work was Damage Control, a miniseries following a company that cleans collateral damage from battles.

After becoming an editor at Marvel, McDuffie submitted a spoof proposal for a comic entitled Teenage Negro Ninja Thrashers in response to Marvel's treatment of its black characters. Becoming a freelancer in 1990, McDuffie wrote for dozens of various comics titles for Marvel, DC Comics, and Archie Comics. In addition, he wrote Monster in My Pocket for Harvey Comics editor Sid Jacobson, whom he cites on his website as having taught him everything he knows. In early 1991, he divorced his first wife, Patricia D. Younger, in Seminole County, Florida.

In the early 1990s, wanting to express a multicultural sensibility that he felt was missing in comic books, McDuffie and three partners founded Milestone Media, which The Plain Dealer of Cleveland, Ohio, described in 2000 as "the industry's most successful minority-owned-and operated comic company". McDuffie explained:

If you do a black character or a female character or an Asian character, then they aren't just that character. They represent that race or that sex, and they can't be interesting because everything they do has to represent an entire block of people. You know, Superman isn't all white people and neither is Lex Luthor. We knew we had to present a range of characters within each ethnic group, which means that we couldn't do just one book. We had to do a series of books and we had to present a view of the world that's wider than the world we've seen before.

Milestone, whose characters include the African-American Static, Icon, and Hardware; the Asian-American Xombi, and the multi-ethnic superhero group the Blood Syndicate, debuted its titles in 1993 through a distribution deal with DC Comics. Serving as editor-in-chief, McDuffie created or co-created many characters, including Static.

=== Films, television, and video games ===
After Milestone had ceased publishing new comics, Static was developed into an animated series Static Shock. McDuffie was hired to write and story-edit on the series, writing 11 episodes.

His other television writing credits included Teen Titans and What's New, Scooby-Doo?.

McDuffie was hired as a staff writer for the animated series Justice League and was promoted to story editor and producer for the sequel series Justice League Unlimited. During the series' run, McDuffie wrote, produced, or edited 69 of 91 episodes.

McDuffie also wrote the story for the video game Justice League Heroes.

McDuffie was a writer, producer, and editor for the Ben 10 series Alien Force and Ultimate Alien. During the run of Alien Force, McDuffie was a story editor or writer for all of its episodes. McDuffie also produced and story edited for Ultimate Alien, which premiered April 23, 2010. McDuffie's final writing credit was "The More Things Change", the first episode of Ben 10: Omniverse, which premiered posthumously in 2012.

McDuffie wrote a number of direct-to-DVD animated films featuring DC Comics characters, including Justice League: Crisis on Two Earths and Justice League: Doom. He scripted the film adaptation of All-Star Superman, which released one day after his death. Justice League: Doom was released posthumously in 2012.

=== Return to comics ===
After his work on Justice League and Justice League Unlimited, McDuffie returned to writing comic books. He wrote the Marvel miniseries Beyond!.

In 2007, McDuffie wrote several issues of Firestorm for DC Comics, starting in January through to its cancellation. Later that year, he became the regular writer on Fantastic Four, scripting issues #542–553 (cover-dated Dec. 2006 March 2008). Furthermore, he wrote Justice League of America vol. 2 from issues #13–34 (November 2007 – August 2009). He was fired from the series following a Lying in the Gutters compilation of his frank answers to fans about the creative process.

McDuffie married comic book and television writer Charlotte Fullerton in 2009.

McDuffie wrote Milestone Forever, a two-issue miniseries chronicling the final adventures of his Milestone characters before they are transported to the DC Universe.

== Death ==
On February 21, 2011, one day after his 49th birthday, McDuffie died at Providence Saint Joseph Medical Center in Burbank, California, of complications from emergency heart surgery.

=== Tributes ===
The 2012 film Justice League: Doom is dedicated to Dwayne McDuffie, and the Blu-ray and 2-Disc DVD editions of the film include the documentary A Legion of One: The Dwayne McDuffie Story. That same year, a diner named "McDuffie's" was depicted in the Green Lantern: The Animated Series episode "The New Guy".

In 2012, the Ultimate Spider-Man episode "Damage" was dedicated to McDuffie. Furthermore, Mac Porter, the CEO of Damage Control, is modeled after him.

The Ben 10: Ultimate Alien finale episode "The Ultimate Enemy" and the video game Ben 10: Galactic Racing are dedicated to McDuffie.

In the 2011 Static Shock comics series, Virgil Hawkins' high school is named after McDuffie.

In 2015, the Long Beach Comic Expo gave out the first Dwayne McDuffie Award for Diversity in Comics. It has since become an annual event for the expo.

The Dwayne McDuffie Award for Kids' Comics is given out each year at the Ann Arbor Comic Arts Festival.

DC Comics character Naomi McDuffie is named after McDuffie.

== Awards and nominations ==
- In 1995, McDuffie received Eisner Award nominations for Best Writer (for Icon), Best Editor (for Worlds Collide, Xombi, and Shadow Cabinet), and Best Continuing Series (with M.D. Bright for Icon)
- In 1996, McDuffie won the Golden Apple Award from his alma mater the Roeper School for the "use of popular art to promote and advance human worth and dignity".
- In 2003, McDuffie was awarded the Humanitas Prize in Children's Animation for the Static Shock episode "Jimmy", which explores the topic of gun violence.
- In 2003 and 2004, McDuffie was nominated, with other Static Shock creators, for Daytime Emmy awards.
- In 2005, McDuffie was nominated for the Writers Guild of America award in animation, with Rich Fogel and John Ridley, for the Justice League episode "Starcrossed".
- In 2008, McDuffie was voted Favorite Breakout Talent in the Wizard Fan Awards in Wizard Magazine.
- In 2009, McDuffie won Comic Con International's Inkpot Award.
- In 2011, McDuffie was posthumously awarded the Animation Writers Caucus' annual Animation Writing Award by the Writers Guild of America, West.

== Screenwriting ==
- series head writer denoted in bold

=== Television ===
- **Static Shock** (2000–2004): season 4 head writer
- What's New, Scooby-Doo? (2002)
- **Justice League** (2002–2004): season 2 head writer
- Teen Titans (2004)
- **Justice League Unlimited** (2004–2006)
- **Ben 10: Alien Force** (2008–2010)
- **Ben 10: Ultimate Alien** (2010–2012)
- Ben 10: Omniverse (2012)

=== Films ===
- Justice League: Crisis on Two Earths (2010)
- All-Star Superman (2011)
- Justice League: Doom (2012)

== Bibliography ==
=== Regular writer ===
- "Overture" (in Marvel Comics Presents #19, Marvel Comics, May 1989)
- Damage Control (4-issue limited series, Marvel Comics, May–Aug. 1989)
- Captain Marvel Giant-Sized Special (one-shot, Marvel Comics, Nov. 1989)
- The Sensational She-Hulk in Ceremony (2-issue miniseries, Marvel Comics, 1989)
- Giant Size Special Captain Marvel (one-shot, Marvel Comics, Nov. 1989)
- Damage Control vol. 2 (4-issue limited series, Marvel Comics, December 1989 – February 1990)
- The Amazing Spider-Man: Children Special #1–3 (Marvel Comics [Canada], 1990)
- Deathlok #1–4 (4-issue limited series, Marvel Comics, July–October 1990)
- "The Road to Hell" (with co-author Matt Wayne and art by Colin MacNeil, in Toxic! #30–31, 1991)
- Monster in My Pocket #1–4 (Harvey Comics, May–Sept. 1991)
- Damage Control vol. 3 (4-issue limited series, Marvel Comics, June 1991 – September 1991)
- Prince: Alter Ego (one-shot, DC Comics(Piranha Music, 1991))
- Deathlok vol. 2, #1–5, #11–16, annual #1 (Marvel Comics, July–Nov. 1991, May–Oct. 1992)
- Prince: Three Chains of Gold (one-shot, DC Comics (Piranha Music, 1992))
- Double Dragon #1–4 (Marvel Comics, July–Oct. 1991)
- "Rest and Sweet Glory" (in Marvel Comics Presents #113–118, Marvel Comics, 1992)
- The Demon #26–29 (DC Comics, August–November 1992)
- Back to the Future: Forward to the Future #1–3 (Harvey Comics, Oct. 1992 – Jan. 1993)
- Blood Syndicate #1–4 (Milestone Comics, April–July 1993)
- Hardware #1–8,10–19, 25, 29–32 (DC Comics [Milestone], April 1993 – Oct. 1995)
- Icon #1–10,13,15–17,19–31,34–36,38–42 (DC Comics [Milestone], May 1993 – Feb. 1997)
- Static #1–4 (DC Comics [Milestone], June–Sept. 1993)
- Shadow Cabinet #0 (co-author, DC Comics [Milestone], Jan. 1994)
- Captain Marvel (one-shot, Marvel Comics, February 1994)
- Worlds Collide (one-shot, DC Comics [Milestone], July 1994)
- X-O Manowar #17,19–21 (Acclaim Comics, February–June 1998)
- Sins of Youth: Kid Flash/Impulse (one-shot, DC Comics, May 2000)
- Static Shock! Rebirth of the Cool #1–4 (DC Comics [Milestone], January–September 2001)
- Batman: Legends of the Dark Knight #156–158, #164–167 (DC Comics, August–October 2002, April–July 2003)
- Fantastic Four Special (one-shot, Marvel Comics, Feb. 2006)
- Beyond! (6-issue limited series, Marvel Comics, July–Dec. 2006)
- Fantastic Four #542–553 (Marvel Comics)
- Justice League of America #13–28, 30-34 (DC Comics, 2007–2009)

=== Fill-in writer ===
- "Fall Guy" (co-author, in Solo Avengers #13, Marvel Comics, Dec. 1988)
- Clive Barker's Hellraiser #2 (Marvel Comics [Epic], 1989)
- St. George #8 (Marvel Comics [Epic], Aug. 1989)
- Iron Man #251–252 (Marvel Comics, Dec. 1989 – Jan.1990)
- Iron Man #55 (Marvel Comics, April 1990)
- Avengers Annual #19 (Marvel Comics, 1990)
- Avengers Spotlight #26 (Marvel Comics, December 1989, first and second stories); #27-29 (December 1989-February 1990, second stories only)
- Avengers West Coast Annual #5 (Marvel Comics, 1990)
- Iron Man Annual #11 (Marvel Comics, 1990)
- "Test Run" (co-author, in Marvel Comics Presents #62, Marvel Comics, Nov. 1990)
- "Shadow of a Doubt" (co-author, in Marvel Super-Heroes vol. 3, #4, Marvel Comics, Dec.1990)
- "Cupid's Arrow" (in Marvel Super-Heroes vol. 3, #9, Marvel Comics, April 1992)
- "Not to Touch the Earth" (co-author, in Marvel Super-Heroes vol. 3, #11, Marvel Comics, Oct. 1992)
- "Cupid's Error" (co-author, in Marvel Super-Heroes vol. 3, #12, Marvel Comics, Jan.1993)
- Clive Barker's Hellraiser #7–10, 15 (Marvel Comics [Epic], 1991–1992)
- Hardware #25 (DC Comics [Milestone], March 1995)
- "Communications Error". JLA Showcase 80-Page Giant #1 (DC Comics, Feb.1993)
- Static #14 (DC Comics [Milestone], Aug. 1994)
- Blood Syndicate #35 (DC Comics [Milestone], Feb. 1996)
- Impulse #60 (DC Comics, May 2000)
- "Never Say Die". Batman: Gotham Knights #27 (DC Comics, May 2002)

=== Editor ===
- Freddy Krueger's A Nightmare on Elm Street #1–2 (Marvel Comics, October–November 1989)
- Blood Syndicate #1–30 (DC Comics [Milestone], April 1993 – Sept. 1995)
- Hardware #1–10 (DC Comics [Milestone], April 1993 – Dec. 1993)
- Icon #1–8 (DC Comics [Milestone], May–Dec. 1993)
- Static #1–28 (DC Comics [Milestone], June 1993 – Oct. 1995)
- Static #30 (DC Comics [Milestone], Dec. 1995)
- Shadow Cabinet #0 (DC Comics [Milestone], Jan. 1994)
- Xombi #0 (DC Comics [Milestone], Jan. 1994)
- Frank (2-issue miniseries, Harvey Comics, March–May 1994)
- "The Call" (in Superman: The Man of Steel #34, DC Comics, June 1994)
- Kobalt #1–10 (DC Comics [Milestone], June 1994 – March 1995)
- Shadow Cabinet #1–17 (DC Comics [Milestone], June 1994 – Oct. 1995)
- Xombi #1–16 (DC Comics [Milestone], June 1994 – Sept. 1995)
- Worlds Collide (one-shot, DC Comics [Milestone], July 1994)
- Deathwish #1–4 (4-issue limited series, DC Comics [Milestone], Dec. 1994 – March 1995)
- My Name is Holocaust #1 (limited series, DC Comics [Milestone], May 1995)
- Kobalt #14 (DC Comics [Milestone], Aug. 1995)
- Static Shock! Rebirth of the Cool #1–4 (DC Comics [Milestone], January–September 2001)

Preceded by Danny Fingeroth	Iron Man writer 1989–1990	Succeeded by John Byrne
Preceded by None	Deathlok writer 1990–1992	Succeeded by Gregory Wright
Preceded by None	Blood Syndicate writer/editor 1993 (writer) (editor)	Succeeded by Ivan Velez Jr. (writer); Matt Wayne (editor)
Preceded by None	Hardware writer/editor 1993–1994 (writer); 1993 (editor)	Succeeded by Adam Blaustein (writer); Matt Wayne (editor)
Preceded by None	Icon writer 1993–1997	Succeeded by None
Preceded by None	Static writer/editor 1993 (writer) (editor)	Succeeded by Robert L. Washington III (writer); Jacqueline Ching (editor)
Preceded by None	Shadow Cabinet writer/editor 1994 (with Robert L. Washington III) (writer) (editor)	Succeeded by Robert L. Washington III (writer); None (editor)
Preceded by None	Xombi writer/editor 1994 (writer) (editor)	Succeeded by John Rozum (writer); Jacqueline Ching (editor)
Preceded by Adam Blaustein & Yves Fezzani	Hardware writer 1995	Succeeded by John Rozum
Preceded by Brian Augustyn	X-O Manowar (vol 2) writer 1998	Succeeded by None
Preceded by Mark D. Bright (writer); Matt Wayne (editor) (in 1997)	Static Shock! Rebirth of the Cool writer/editor 2001	Succeeded by None
Preceded by Mike Baron	Batman: Legends of the Dark Knight writer 2002	Succeeded by John Ostrander
Preceded by John Arcudi	Batman: Legends of the Dark Knight writer 2003	Succeeded by Tom Peyer
Preceded by Stuart Moore	Firestorm writer 2007	Succeeded by N/A
Preceded by J. Michael Straczynski	Fantastic Four writer 2007–2008	Succeeded by Mark Millar
Preceded by Brad Meltzer	Justice League of America writer 2007–2009	Succeeded by Len Wein
