= Genesis (DC Comics) =

Comic book crossover storyline

- Cover of Genesis #2 (Oct 1997), by Alan Davis.
- Publisher: DC Comics
- Publication date: October 1997
- Genre: Superhero; Crossover
Title(s)
The Adventures of Superman #551
Aquaman vol. 5 #37
Azrael #34
Batman #547
Genesis #1-4
Green Lantern vol. 3 #91
Impulse #30
Jack Kirby's Fourth World #8
Legion of Super-Heroes vol. 4 #97
Lobo #44
The Power of Shazam! #31
Resurrection Man #6
Robin vol. 2 #46
Sovereign Seven #27
The Spectre vol. 3 #58
Starman vol. 2 #35
Steel #43
Superboy and the Ravers #14
Supergirl vol. 5 #14
Superman vol. 2 #128
Superman: The Man of Steel #72
Teen Titans vol. 2 #13
Wonder Woman vol. 2 #126
Xero #6
Young Heroes in Love #5
- Main character(s): Highfather; Darkseid; Superman

Creative team
- Writer: John Byrne
- Penciller: Ron Wagner
- Inker: Joe Rubinstein
- Colorist: Patricia Mulvihill

"Genesis" is a comic book crossover storyline published by DC Comics that ran through a self-titled four-issue weekly miniseries and various tie-in issues, all cover-dated October 1997. The main miniseries was written by John Byrne and drawn by Ron Wagner.

== Plot ==
The storyline revolves around the concept of the "Godwave", an interstellar phenomenon created by the Source that spread across the universe, creating gods on its first pass before reaching the edge of the universe and bouncing back, creating demigods and metahumans on its second pass.

The Godwave threatens reality when it reaches back to its starting point, altering or neutralizing the abilities of various metahumans and making ordinary humans feel like something is missing. The superheroes of Earth and the New Gods of New Genesis battle Darkseid to prevent him from accomplishing his plan to seize the power of the Godwave. Darkseid and his forces stage an invasion of Earth before travelling to the Source Wall where they are confronted by the heroes.

== Reading order ==
1. Green Lantern vol. 3 #91 – "Torture"
2. The Power of Shazam! #31 – "The Gods Must be Crazy!"
3. Starman #35 – "Mr. Pip and Mr. Black"
4. Steel #43 – "Vertigo"
5. Superman: The Man of Steel #72 – "Altered States"
6. Genesis #1 – "Resonance"
7. Genesis #2 – "Edge of Destruction"
8. Azrael #34 – "Run, Angel, Run"
9. Batman #547 – "Dark Genesis"
10. Impulse #30 – "Everything Sucks"
11. Jack Kirby's Fourth World #8 – "Godhood's End"
12. Sovereign Seven #27 – "Mother's Day"
13. Supergirl vol. 4 #14 – "Secrets and Lies"
14. Superman vol. 2 #128 – "Genesis Anew"
15. The Adventures of Superman #551 – "Genesis for Humanity"
16. Aquaman vol. 5 #37 – "One Demon Life"
17. Lobo #44 – "3-Piece Suite (Chapter 1: The Coach Party)"
18. Young Heroes in Love #5 – "Out of the Frying Pan and Into the Trans-Universal Galacto-Storm!"
19. Resurrection Man #6 – "Double Take"
20. Genesis #3 – "Event Horizon"
21. Legion of Super-Heroes vol. 4 #97 – "Dwarfing the Infinite"
22. Robin vol. 2 #46 – "Dark at Dawn"
23. The Spectre vol. 3 #58 – "The Source of All Things"
24. Superboy and the Ravers #14 – "Suicide Squad"
25. Teen Titans vol. 2 #13 – "Titans: Then & Now (Part 2)"
26. Wonder Woman vol. 2 #126 – "Where Have All the Heroes Gone?"
27. Xero #6 – "The Villain"
28. Genesis #4 – "The Final Battle – To Save the Source"

== Collected editions ==
The Fourth World By John Byrne Omnibus (ISBN ISBN 9781779510174), published July 2021, includes The New Gods #12-15, Jack Kirby's Fourth World #1-20, and the miniseries Genesis #1-4.
