= Romeo Tanghal =

Filipino comics artist (born 1943)

- Born: July 24, 1947 (age 79)
- Areas: Penciller, Inker
- Notable works: The New Teen Titans
- Awards: Inkpot Award 2013
- Spouse: Aurora
- Children: Romeo Alexis, Raphael Angelo

Romeo Tanghal (born July 24, 1947) is a Filipino comics artist who has worked primarily as an inker. He became well known in the industry in the 1980s for his work on DC Comics' The New Teen Titans.

== Career ==
Romeo Tanghal was born and raised in the Philippines. A self–taught artist, he often brought comic books to school instead of his textbooks. Drawing inspiration from artist Joe Kubert's work on The Brave and The Bold, he began doing comics illustrations after graduating high school, working for Gold Star Publications for two years as a production assistant for paste-ups, mechanicals, and corrections.

Tanghal briefly worked with various local publications before emigrating to Detroit in 1976 with his wife, Aurora. After meeting DC Comics editor Joe Orlando in New York, Tanghal's first published work in the U.S. was "If There Were No Batman... I Would Have to Invent Him" in Batman #284 (Feb. 1977). Following Orlando's advice, he then drew short stories for House of Mystery, House of Secrets, and Weird War Tales to adapt his style to better fit American comics. He later worked on such features as Super Friends, "Scalphunter" in Weird Western Tales, and "Gravedigger" in Men of War.

In 1980, Tanghal became the inker of George Pérez's penciled artwork on The New Teen Titans. Tanghal drew two origin stories for DC's digest line during this time, a ten-page short story in DC Special Blue Ribbon Digest #5 (Nov.–Dec. 1980) featuring Zatara and Zatanna, and the origin of the Penguin in The Best of DC #10 (March 1981). Tanghal began working for Marvel Comics in 1986. He inked the comics adaptations of such films as Labyrinth, Elvira, Mistress of the Dark, and Willow. Tanghal did character design and storyboards for Sunbow Entertainment from 1985 to 1987.

== Awards ==
Tanghal received an Inkpot Award in 2013.

== Bibliography ==
=== Continuity Comics ===
- Crazyman #1 (1992)

=== DC Comics ===
- 9-11: The World's Finest Comic Book Writers & Artists Tell Stories to Remember, Volume Two SC (2002)
- Action Comics #512–514 (1980)
- Action Comics Weekly #626–635 (1988–1989)
- Adventure Comics #467–478 (Starman); #486 ("Dial H for Hero") (1980–1981)
- All-Out War #1–6 (1979–1980)
- Amethyst vol. 2 #2–5 (1985)
- Army at War #1 (1978)
- Batman #284–285, 512–513 (1977–1994)
- Batman Family #18–19 (1978)
- Batman: League of Batmen #1–2 (2001)
- The Best of DC #10 (Penguin); #18 (Teen Titans) (1981)
- Black Condor #7 (1992)
- The Brave and the Bold #146 (1979)
- Cancelled Comic Cavalcade #1 (1978)
- Captain Atom #23–24, 28–33, 35–48, 50, 52, 54–57 (1988–1991)
- DC Comics Presents #27–29, 41, 74 (1980–1984)
- DC Special Blue Ribbon Digest #5 (Zatanna) (1980)
- DC Special Series #4, 13, 21, 26 (1977–1981)
- DC Super Stars #15, 18 (1977–1978)
- DC Universe: Trinity #1 (1993)
- Detective Comics #492 (1980)
- Doctor Fate #32, 36 (1991–1992)
- Doorway to Nightmare #3, 5 (1978)
- El Diablo #12 (1990)
- The Flash #289 (Firestorm backup story) (1980)
- The Flash vol. 2 #11 (1988)
- The Fly Annual #1 (1992)
- The Fury of Firestorm #24–25, 30 (1984)
- Ghosts #69, 78, 97 (1978–1981)
- G.I. Combat #202, 204 (1977)
- Green Lantern vol. 3 #13–17, 19–42, 44–79, 81–87, 0 (1991–1997)
- Green Lantern Corps Quarterly #2–4 (1992–1993)
- Green Lantern Special #2 (1989)
- Green Lantern: Emerald Dawn #1–6 (1989–1990)
- Green Lantern: Emerald Dawn II #1–6 (1991)
- Green Lantern: Mosaic #6 (1992)
- Heroes Against Hunger #1 (1986)
- House of Mystery #252–253, 256, 283, 291 (1977–1981)
- House of Secrets #154 (1978)
- Icon #14, 25, 31, 33–36, 38–42 (1994–1997)
- Jonah Hex #5, 23, 25, 40–41, 45–46 (1977–1981)
- Justice League America #75, 78–79 (1993)
- Justice League Europe #35, 39, Annual #3 (1992)
- Justice League International vol. 2 #57 (1993)
- Justice League of America #196–197, 203–207, 210–215, 217–220, 222–223 (1981–1984)
- Justice League Quarterly #8 (1992)
- Justice League Task Force #17 (1994)
- L.E.G.I.O.N. '92 #46 (1992)
- Legends of the DC Universe #19, 80-Page Giant #1 (1998–1999)
- Legion of Super-Heroes Annual #3 (1984)
- Legion of Super-Heroes vol. 3 #39, Annual #4 (1987–1988)
- Manhunter #5–6 (1988)
- Men of War #1–26 (Gravedigger) (1977–1980)
- Milestone Forever #1 (2010)
- Mister Miracle vol. 2 #19, 26 (1990–1991)
- The New Adventures of Superboy #9, 12, 22 (1980–1981)
- The New Teen Titans #1–2, 4–5, 7–38, 40, Annual #1 (1980–1984)
- The New Teen Titans vol. 2 #3–31, 33–36, 38–40, 42–49, Annual #3–4 (1984–1988)
- The New Titans #54–56 (1989)
- Omega Men #15, 17–19 (1984)
- Ragman vol. 2 #7–8 (1992)
- Robin vol. 4 #6 (1994)
- Secret Origins vol. 2 #50, Annual #3 (1989–1990)
- Secrets of Haunted House #9, 40 (1977–1981)
- Sgt. Rock #306, 308–309, 317, 323, 340 (1977–1980)
- Showcase '94 #5 (1994)
- Star Trek vol. 2 #49 (1993)
- Star Trek: The Next Generation vol. 2 #50, Special #1 (1993)
- Sun Devils #2–4 (1984)
- Super Friends #35–37, 39–40, 42–47 (1980–1981)
- The Superman Family #184–193 (1977–1979)
- Super-Team Family #13–15 (1977–1978)
- Tales of the Teen Titans #41, 57–58 (1984–1985)
- Team Titans #5 (1993)
- Teen Titans Spotlight #10, 13, 20 (1987–1988)
- Time Warp #2 (1979)
- The Unexpected #192–193, 195, 198, 209 (1979–1981)
- Unknown Soldier #214, 216, 219, 221, 223–224, 235 (1978–1980)
- Vigilante #5 (1984)
- War of the Gods #2–3 (1991)
- The Warlord #38–39, 46 (1980–1981)
- Weird War Tales #59, 69–71, 75, 78–79, 83, 98 (1978–1981)
- Weird Western Tales #55, 58–70 (Scalphunter) (1979–1980)
- Wonder Woman #287–290 (1982)
- Wonder Woman vol. 2 #41–48, 50–51, 53–59, 62–63, 70–71, 89, 137–138, Annual #7 (1990–1998)
- World's Finest Comics #257–258, 261–262, 268, 270, 277 (1979–1982)
- Worlds Collide #1 (1994)

=== Eclipse Comics ===
- Airboy #13–14 (1987)
- Alien Encounters #14 (1987)
- Hotspur #1–3 (1987)
- Strike! #1–6 (1987–1988)
- Total Eclipse #2, 4 (1988–1989)

=== Marvel Comics ===
- Barbie #44 (1994)
- Captain America #377, 424 (1990–1994)
- Dazzler #42 (1986)
- D.P. 7 #1–7 (1986–1987)
- Fantastic Four #303, 317, 321, 323–335 (1987–1989)
- G.I. Joe a Real American Hero #105 (1990)
- Impossible Man Summer Vacation Spectacular #1 (1990)
- Marvel Graphic Novel: Willow movie adaptation (1988)
- Marvel Spring Special #1 (Elvira, Mistress of the Dark movie adaptation) (1988)
- Marvel Super Special #40 (Labyrinth movie adaptation) (1986)
- Nick Fury, Agent of S.H.I.E.L.D. vol. 2 #15–17 (1990)
- Psi-Force #7, 10, 17–18 (1987–1988)
- Saga of the Original Human Torch #4 (1990)
- Savage Sword of Conan #182 (1991)
- Thor #399, 422, Annual #19 (1989–1994)
- Thor Corps #3–4 (1993)
- Visionaries #1–4, 6 (1987–1988)
- West Coast Avengers #23 (1987)

=== Valiant Comics ===
- Quantum and Woody #7 (1997)

Preceded by n/a	The New Teen Titans inker 1980–1984	Succeeded by Dick Giordano
Preceded by George Pérez	The New Teen Titans vol. 2 inker 1984–1988	Succeeded by Bob McLeod
Preceded by Joe Sinnott	Fantastic Four inker 1988–1989	Succeeded by Mike DeCarlo
Preceded by Pablo Marcos	Green Lantern vol. 3 inker 1991–1997	Succeeded by Terry Austin
