= Mystek =

- Mystek's first appearance: The Ray (vol. 2) #12, art by Manny Clark.

Publication information
- Publisher: DC Comics
- First appearance: The Ray (vol. 2) #12 (May 1995)
- Created by: Christopher Priest (writer); Manny Clark (artist)

In-story information
- Alter ego: Jennifer Barclay
- Team affiliations: Justice League Task Force; Justice League
- Notable aliases: Seong, Barclay
- Abilities: Energy manipulation

Mystek is a fictional character in the DC Comics universe. She was created by Christopher Priest and Manny Clark, and first appeared in Ray #12 (May 1995).

== Publication history ==
Mystek's death was the result of behind the scenes workings. Christopher Priest intended for the character to star in her own miniseries and was told to put her in Justice League Task Force to generate hype for her in advance. When the plans for the miniseries fell through, Priest killed Mystek off.

== Fictional character biography ==
Very little information has been revealed about Mystek's life, prior to her first confrontation with the Ray. Seong was a young Korean woman, born in Queens, New York, who preferred to be called 'Barclay'. Her father was involved with some sort of sensitive work, and was captured, leading to her fear of federal agents. During an undisclosed incident in Seoul, she developed intense claustrophobia.

=== The Ray ===
In Philadelphia, Seong owns Circuit Shack, an electronics store. Raymond Terrill, secretly known as the Ray, went shopping at her store, setting off sensors which register him as a powerful metahuman. Believing that he was sent to capture her, Seong attacks the Ray, who attempts to protect his identity by not directly confronting her. He ultimately uses his solid light powers to create a simulacrum of himself, so she would believe that the Ray and Raymond Terrill were not the same person.

Some time later, after seeing through his trickery, Mystek pursues the Ray. She travels to his apartment and comes across his electron shield, a device which allows access to the headquarters of the Justice League Task Force. Seong is transported to the assembled JLTF and attacks them, believing them to be a hostile government agency.

=== Justice League Task Force ===
Weeks later, Martian Manhunter recruits Mystek into the Justice League Task Force. While she accepts his offer, her tenure was brief. Soon after joining them, the team is on a mission to the planet Xanthcar, where L-Ron is being put on trial. However, Mystek is overcome with claustophobia and blasts her way out of the pod. She soon suffocates and dies.

== Powers and abilities ==
Mystek could manipulate energy at a subatomic level, using quarks to form high-tolerance elastic, proactive matter. This hybridized state of matter was not pure energy, and therefore could pass harmlessly through an immaterial foe. She could use any electronic device as a window for this matter, allowing her a range of abilities, including flight. She was also able to use this matter offensively, in the form of energy blasts, and to read magnetic signatures.
