= M. D. Bright =

American artist (1955–2024)

- Born: Mark D. Bright; December 27, 1955
- Died: March 27, 2024 (aged 68)
- Areas: Penciller, Inker
- Notable works: Power Man and Iron Fist; G.I. Joe: A Real American Hero; Quantum and Woody; Solo Avengers (Hawkeye feature); Icon; Iron Man

Mark D. Bright (December 27, 1955 – March 27, 2024) was an American comic book and storyboard artist. Sometimes credited as Doc Bright (a play on his initials), he was best known for pencilling the Marvel Comics Iron Man story "Armor Wars", the two Green Lantern: Emerald Dawn miniseries for DC Comics, for painting the cover to Marvel Comics' Transformers #5 and for co-creating Quantum and Woody with writer Christopher J. Priest. Bright later became a freelance storyboard artist, although he and Priest reunited for a five-issue Quantum and Woody miniseries published by the new incarnation of Valiant Comics in 2014–2015.

== Biography ==
Quantum & Woody: Director's Cut Trade by VALIANT Comics

Bright was born on December 27, 1955 and grew up in Montclair, New Jersey. His work in comics began in 1978 with a three-page story in House of Mystery #257 (April 1978). His first regular work was providing the art for the Christopher Priest-penned Falcon mini-series in 1983. One issue was completed by artist Paul Smith, and Bright pencilled the remaining three issues.

Bright again collaborated with Priest on the final 10 issues of Power Man and Iron Fist. Bright's regular-artist runs on comic-book series include Solo Avengers, Iron Man, G.I. Joe, Green Lantern, Action Comics (when it was published weekly), Milestone Comics' Icon and Acclaim Comics' Quantum and Woody. Although Bright inked some of his covers, most of his interior comics artwork was created in collaboration with an inker, primarily Romeo Tanghal, Randy Emberlin, Greg Adams and Mike Gustovich. During his years as a full-time comic book artist, Bright also provided artwork for analogous trading cards: The Green Lantern Hal Jordan card for Impel's 1992 DC Cosmic Cards, approximately one-third of Impel's 1991 G.I. Joe trading card set, and all of the Green Lantern and Green Lantern Corps artwork for Impel/Skybox's 1993 DC Cosmic Teams trading cards.

After 20 years in American comic books, Bright moved into storyboarding for commercials, and live-action television and feature films, notably including M. Night Shyamalan's The Last Airbender. He occasionally returned to comics, including an Untold Tales of the New Universe one-shot for Marvel Comics and a Transformers: Spotlight issue for IDW Publishing. Bright also created the Damaged comic series with Jason McKee of A-10 Comics.

Bright died on March 27, 2024, at the age of 68.

== Bibliography ==
Comics work (interior pencil art) includes:

=== DC Comics ===
- A. Bizarro, miniseries, #1–4 (1999)
- Action Comics Weekly #622–635 (1988)
- Aquaman Annual #5 (1999)
- Batman 422, 424, 425, 449 (1988–89)
- Batman: League of Batmen #1–2 (48-pages each, pencils, with writer Doug Moench, DC Comics, 2001)
- Batman: Shadow of the Bat #34 (1995)
- Deadman: Dead Again, miniseries, #4 (2001)
- Firebrand #6 (1996)
- Ghosts #100 (1981)
- Green Lantern, vol. 3, #13–17, 19, #25–31, 33–35, 38–39, 41–43, 46, 132–133, Special #2, 80-Page Giant #2 (1991–2001)
- Green Lantern Corps Quarterly #1–3 (1992)
- Green Lantern: Emerald Dawn, miniseries, #1–6 (1989–90)
- Green Lantern: Emerald Dawn II, miniseries, #1–6 (1991)
- House of Mystery #257 (1978)
- Legion of Super-Heroes vol. 2, #59 (1989)
- Mister Miracle vol. 2 #19 (1990)
- Secret Origins #36 (1989)
- Superman: The Man of Steel #31, Annual #3 (1994)
- The New Titans #56, 87 (1992–93)
- Valor #1–4 (1992–93)
- Wonder Woman vol. 2 #137–138 (1998)

==== Milestone Media ====
- Hardware #14 (fill-in pencils, with writer Dwayne McDuffie, 1994)
- Icon #1–10, 13–17, 19–25, 27–31, 33–36, 38–42 (1993–97)
- Milestone Forever #1–2, (partial pencils for 48-page specials, with writer Dwayne McDuffie, 2010)
- Worlds Collide Special (1994)

==== Paradox Press ====
- The Big Book of Bad (one page story, pencils and inks, DC Comics/Paradox Press, 1998)
- The Big Book of Little Criminals (one page story, pencils and inks, DC Comics/Paradox Press, 1996)
- The Big Book of Urban Legends (one page story, pencils and inks, DC Comics/Paradox Press, 1994)
- The Big Book of the Weird Wild West (one page story, pencils and inks with writer John Whalen, DC Comics/Paradox Press, 1998)

=== Marvel Comics ===
- Avengers #224, Annual #17 (1982, 1988)
- Amazing Spider-Man On Bullying Prevention, (16-pages, with writer Brett Lewis, Target giveaway comic, 2003)
- Black Panther, vol. 2, #11–12, 24 (1999–2000)
- Captain America #358–365 (1989)
- Captain Marvel, vol. 2, #1 (1989)
- Classic X-Men (backup story) #36 (1989)
- Dazzler #25, 32–33 (1983–84)
- Falcon, miniseries, #2–4 (1983–84)
- Fantastic Four Annual #18 (1984)
- G.I. Joe: A Real American Hero #35–36, 89–90, 92–96, 98, 100–106, 108 (1985–91)
- Iron Man #200–201, 203–208, 210, 215–217, 220–223, 225–231, 274, Annual #9, 15 (1985–94)
- Marvel Comics Presents (Iron Man) #51 (1990)
- Marville, miniseries, #1–6 (2002)
- Untold Tales of the New Universe: D.P. 7 (2006)
- Power Man and Iron Fist #115–125 (1985–86)
- Rom #56 (1984)
- Solo Avengers (Hawkeye) #1–3, 5–11 (1987–88)
- Spider-Man vs. Wolverine (one-shot) (1987)
- Thor #333–335 (1983)
- Team America #9 (1983)
- West Coast Avengers Annual #1 (1986)
- X-Factor #120 (1996)

=== Other publishers ===
- Predator 2 #2 (movie adaptation) (pencils, 32 pages, with writer/screenplay adaptor Franz Henkel, (Dark Horse Comics, 1991)
- The Dark #1 (Continüm Comics, 1993)
- Primortals #5 (fill-in pencils for 13 pages, with writer Christopher Mills, Tekno Comics, 1995)
- Quantum and Woody #0–8, 10–17 (pencils, with writer Christopher J. Priest, Acclaim Comics, 1997–1998)
- Quantum and Woody #32, 18–20 (pencils, with writer Christopher J. Priest, Acclaim Comics, 1999-2000)
- Master Lock Presents: The Incredible Hulk #1 (pencils for promo comic, with writer Robin D. Laws, Marvel Comics, 2003)
- Transformers Spotlight: Nightbeat (pencils and inks, with writer Simon Furman, IDW Publishing, 2006)

=== As writer or co-writer ===
- G.I. Joe: A Real American Hero (Marvel Comics) issue #109 (credited as co-plotter)
- Static #44-45 (Milestone Media, 1997)

=== As pin-up contributor, partial list only ===
- The Official Handbook of the Marvel Universe (assorted)
- Who's Who in the DC Universe (assorted)
- L.E.G.I.O.N. Annual #5 (DC Comics, 1994)
- G.I. Joe #129, pin-up of Torpedo, Marvel Comics, 1992
- G.I. Joe #131, pin-up of Duke, Marvel Comics, 1992

== Reprints and collections of M.D. Bright's work ==
- Iron Man: The Armor Wars (reprints Iron Man #225–232, features seven issues by Bright, Marvel Comics, 1990)
- The Many Armors of Iron Man
- Green Lantern: Emerald Dawn (first printing, newsprint paper stock, reprints Green Lantern: Emerald Dawn #1–6, DC Comics, 1991)
- Icon: A Hero's Welcome (first printing, reprints Icon #1–8, DC Comics, 1996)
- GOAT: H.A.E.D.U.S. #1 (contains 3 pages from Quantum and Woody #15, Acclaim Comics 1998)
- Quantum and Woody: The Director's Cut (reprints Quantum and Woody #1–4, plus new pages, features four issues by Bright, Acclaim Comics, 1997)
- Quantum and Woody: Kiss Your Ass Goodbye (reprints Quantum and Woody #5–8, plus new pages, features four issues by Bright, Acclaim Comics, 1998)
- Quantum and Woody: Holy S-Word, We're Cancelled?! (reprints Quantum and Woody #9–12, plus new pages, features three issues by Bright, Acclaim Comics, 1998)
- Quantum and Woody: Magnum Force (reprints Quantum and Woody #13–16, plus new pages, features four issues by Bright, Acclaim Comics, 1999)
- G.I. Joe vol 4 (reprints G.I. Joe #31–40, reprints Bright's partial pages within issue #s 35 & 36, Marvel Comics, 2002)
- Green Lantern: Emerald Dawn (second printing, reprints Green Lantern: Emerald Dawn #1–6, features six issues by Bright, DC Comics, 2003)
- Green Lantern: Emerald Dawn II (reprints Green Lantern: Emerald Dawn II, features six issues by Bright, DC Comics, 2003
- Iron Man: Armor Wars (new edition, colors reseparated and glossy paper, reprints Iron Man #225–232, features seven issues by Bright, Marvel Comics, 2007)
- Iron Man: The Dragon Seed Saga (reprints Iron Man issues #270–275, features one issue by Bright, Marvel Comics, 2008)
- Iron Man: The Many Armors of Iron Man (new edition with new color separations and glossy paper stock from 1993 version, now includes Iron Man issue #200, one issue by Bright, Marvel Comics, 2008)
- Iron Man: Armor Wars (new edition, second printing, black cover, reprints Iron Man #225–232, features seven issues by Bright, Marvel Comics, 2010)
- Iron Man: Armor Wars Prologue reprints Iron Man #215–224, features eight issues by Bright, Marvel Comics, 2010)
- Classic G.I. Joe vol. 4 (reprint of Marvel's 2002 G.I. Joe vol. 4 trade paperback, IDW Publishing, 2009)
- Icon: A Hero's Welcome (second printing, reprints Icon #1–8, DC Comics, 2009)
- Icon: The Mothership Connection (reprints Icon #13, 19–22, features three and a half issues by Bright, DC Comics, 2010)
- Classic G.I. Joe vol. 9 (reprints G.I. Joe #81–90, features two issues by Bright, IDW Publishing, 2010)
- Classic G.I. Joe vol. 10 (reprints G.I. Joe #91–100, features six issues by Bright, IDW Publishing, 2011)
- Classic G.I. Joe vol. 11 (reprints G.I. Joe #101–110, features seven issues by Bright, IDW Publishing, 2011)
- The Complete Quantum and Woody Classic Omnibus (reprints the complete original Q&W series, along with two additional original-era Valiant comics)
- Milestone Compendium One (reprints Blood Syndicate #1-12, Hardware #1-12, Icon #1-10, Shadow Cabinet #0, Static #1-8, Xombi #0-11; features ten issues by Bright, DC Comics/Milestone Media, 2022)
- Milestone Compendium Two (reprints Blood Syndicate #13-23, Hardware #13-21, Icon #11-21, Shadow Cabinet #1-4, Static #9-20, Steel #6-7, Superboy #6-7, Superman: The Man of Steel #35-36, Worlds Collide #1; features nine issues by Bright, DC Comics/Milestone Media, 2023)
