= DC Cosmic Cards =

Card set made by Impel/SkyBox in 1992

DC Cosmic Cards is a card set made by Impel/SkyBox in 1992. In a format similar to the earlier Marvel Universe Cards, the set featured biographies of DC characters from the Silver Age, teams, crossovers and events.

Artists for this series included Murphy Anderson, M. D. Bright, Paris Cullins, Dick Giordano, Carmine Infantino, Gil Kane, Joe Kubert, Steve Leialoha, Shawn McManus, Martin Nodell, Jerry Ordway, Joe Orlando, Howard Post, P. Craig Russell, Tom Sutton and Trevor Von Eeden.

Holograms for the series were drawn by Walt Simonson.

== Cosmic Teams ==
It was followed in 1993 by DC Cosmic Teams, a 150-card set. Both sets were edited by Bhob Stewart.
