= Triumph (comics) =

- Triumph as depicted in Justice League International #68 (September 1994); art by Phil Jimenez (pencils), John Stokes (inks), Gene D'Angelo (colors).

Publication information
- Publisher: DC Comics
- First appearance: Justice League America #91 (August 1994)
- Created by: Mark Waid & Brian Augustyn (writers); Howard Porter (artist)

In-story information
- Alter ego: William MacIntyre
- Species: Metahuman
- Team affiliations: Justice League International; Justice League Task Force; Justice League
- Abilities: Ability to control the electromagnetic spectrum

Triumph (William MacIntyre) is a fictional superhero in the DC Comics universe whose first full appearance was in Justice League America #92 (August 1994). He was created by Brian Augustyn, Mark Waid, and Howard Porter, though the character is primarily associated with writer Christopher Priest.

Priest admitted that Triumph was partially based on DC Comics creative director Neal Pozner, who died just before Triumph's introduction, but knew about the character: "Triumph was always [proven] right... it was what made him so annoying to his fellow heroes… [He] was a gentle tuckerization of… Neal Pozner. Neal was, likely, the sharpest tool in the shed… [Neal] was always right. He was. At the end of the day, Neal would be proven right. That fact, more than anything else, annoyed many staffers beyond reason."

== Fictional character biography ==
Triumph is portrayed as a hot-headed, arrogant and self-righteous individual who felt he was "denied his destiny" to become one of Earth's greatest heroes. Via a retcon in a three-part story running through Justice League America #92, Justice League Task Force #16 and Justice League International (vol. 2) #68, he was revealed to have been a founding member of the Justice League, serving as their leader. On his first mission with the League, Triumph seemingly "saved the world", but was teleported into a dimensional limbo that also affected the timestream, resulting in no one having any memory of him.

One of Triumph's motivations for becoming a superhero was that his father was a low-ranking henchman for supervillains, a life that worried his mother. The young Triumph, however, misinterpreted her concern as a sign that his father was abusive and his henchman outfit to mean that his father had been a major supervillain.

When he escapes Limbo, Triumph's meeting with Justice League International quickly devolves into a violent confrontation. He ended up starring in a significant portion of the Justice League Task Force comic book (issues #0 and 16–37), alongside regulars Ray and Gypsy. Dissatisfied with the infrequency of JLTF missions, Triumph founds a second team of his own to target perpetrators of violent crime and completely dismantle their organizations. His attitude ultimately results in his expulsion from the Justice League Task Force.

Triumph receives a carved black candle from the demon Neron, who offers to return the decade he lost in Limbo in exchange for his soul. Triumph attempts to make amends with Martian Manhunter, only to storm out when he is not let back into the League. He considers lighting the candle, despondent and weary with his failed career, but Gypsy convinces him not to. The Ray and Gypsy unwittingly light the candle during a memorial, which gives Triumph his lost decade back. However, he is dismayed that history did not change without him: the League was the same as it had always been and Gypsy was still alive even without his presence.

In JLA ongoing series, Triumph was destitute and a failure, resorting to selling stolen League items to supervillains just to pay his rent. He comes under the influence of an evil imp from the Fifth Dimension named Lkz, causing him to attack the Justice League. The combined forces of the JSA and JLA were required to stop the rampaging Thunderbolt and subdue Triumph, culminating in Johnny Thunder's Thunderbolt merging with Lkz to become a new purple Thunderbolt.

At the end of this story arc, the hostless Spectre-Force transforms Triumph into an ice statue and prepares to smash him with a hammer, but is stopped by Zauriel. Triumph is stored in the Justice League Watchtower, marked "Founding Member of the J.L.A." as a memorial. Prometheus later destroys the Watchtower, killing Triumph.

In Trinity, Triumph is resurrected in an alternate reality created by the forceful extraction of the Trinity formed by Batman, Superman and Wonder Woman. In this reality, Triumph is a member of Justice Society International and comrade of Tomorrow Woman. Both are informed by Hawkman that they are supposed to be dead, but choose to fight to restore the timeline. Triumph later dies after taking an attack that was meant for Tomorrow Woman and dies in her arms.

== Powers and abilities ==
Triumph is able to manipulate the electromagnetic spectrum. This power gives him a form of electromagnetic psychometry, which allowed him to perceive the entire electromagnetic spectrum and detect television and radio signals. Triumph also displayed advanced electromagnetic energy manipulation; Superman even remarked that Triumph could kill him by cutting off his access to solar energy. Triumph is also able to project electricity in the form of projectiles and force fields.
