= Young Heroes in Love =

Comic book series

- Young Heroes: Off-Ramp, Monstergirl, Bonfire, Thunderhead, Hard Drive, Frostbite and Zip Kid.

Publication information
- Publisher: DC Comics
- First appearance: Young Heroes in Love #1 (June 1997)
- Created by: Dan Raspler; Dev Madan

In-story information
- Member(s): Off-Ramp; Monstergirl; Bonfire; Thunderhead; Hard Drive; Frostbite; Junior; Zip Kid

Young Heroes in Love is an American comic book series published by DC Comics; it ran for 18 issues (including the #1,000,000 issue) from 1997 to 1998. An uncommon combination of the superhero and romance genres, it introduced two LGBT male characters into the DC Universe – Frostbite and Off-Ramp – who were depicted becoming a couple, which was considered groundbreaking for the time. Unusually for a comic set in an established publisher-owned universe, Dan Raspler and Dev Madan retained copyright to the stories and art.

== Publication history ==
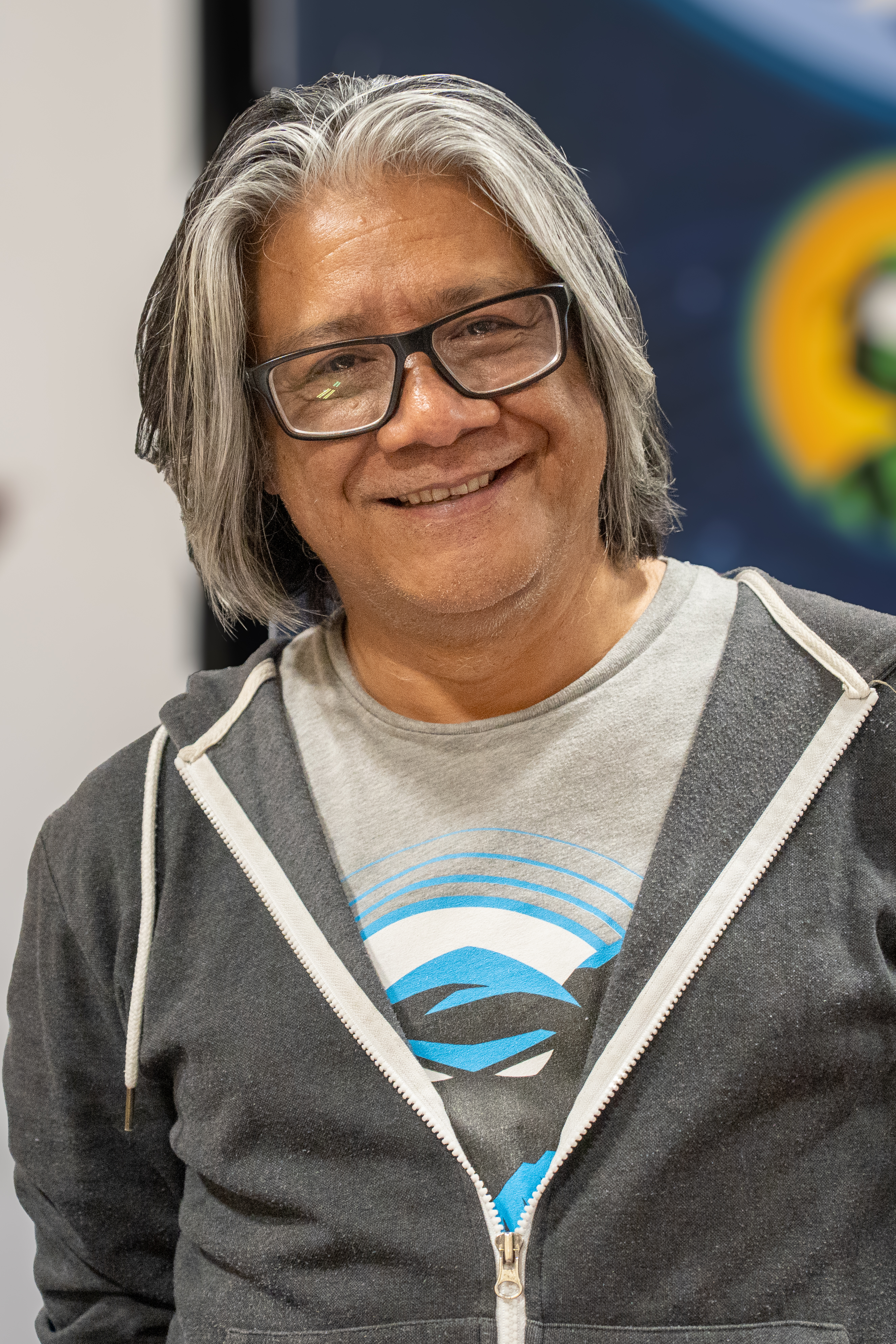
Dev Madan at Comic Con Oakland 2026

The series was created by Dan Raspler and Dev Madan, and explored the trope of the "garage band" as it applied to superheroes: the Young Heroes (as they called themselves) were not so much a team as a somewhat haphazard grouping of superhumans who had been persuaded to work together, but were not really ready to deal with it.

The series was involved with two crossovers. Genesis featured some of the cast going through power-changes and the defeat of Kalibak. The #1,000,000 issue was a part of the DC One Million storyline. It featured mainly citizens of the future who resembled the characters but, near the end, had appearances by older versions of Off-Ramp and Frostbite.

== Characters ==
- Hard Drive (Jeremy Horton) is the team's self-proclaimed leader. A powerful telekinetic, he also has telepathic powers of persuasion which he keeps a secret. Hard Drive has preconceived notions as to how the team members should behave and interact, and was not above manipulating their minds and behaviors to fit these notions. He eventually has a nervous breakdown, after which he retires from being a hero and becomes governor of Connecticut.
- Off-Ramp (George Sloan) has the ability to open portals to anywhere in time and space and ride a vehicle through it. Off-Ramp's preferred vehicle is his hot-rod, a car he has named "Roadshow". He is eventually revealed to be one of a small clan of "travelers" who share his abilities. He is a loving father and his young son lives in Italy.
- Monstergirl (Rita Lopez) has the ability to shapeshift into animals, monsters, and even human forms. Monstergirl joined the group along with her childhood friend Thunderhead. She eventually discovers that she is an alien being. She goes to work for Hard Drive when he becomes governor of Connecticut.
- Bonfire (Anne Fletcher) is a pyrokinetic. Hard Drive and Monstergirl tried to manipulate Bonfire into a romance with Thunderhead, but she was more interested in Frostbite.
- Thunderhead (Scott Tucker) is superhumanly strong and resistant to damage. In the wake of the Genesis event, he gains electrical powers.
- Frostbite has cold-related powers, blue skin and hair, and pointed ears. He was later revealed to be bisexual, and to have an extended lifespan (he appeared, visibly older but alive, in the #1,000,000 issue, set thousands of years in the future).
- Junior (Benjamin Newton) is the most intelligent of the team, and stands at six inches tall. The laboratory accident responsible for his condition did not give him the ability to return to normal size.
- Zip-Kid (Stacy Taglia) is able to shrink from human size to six inches tall, and (unlike Junior) to grow back to normal. She is also able to fly, and to fire concussive blasts from her hands.
