= Continüm Comics =

Defunct American comic book publisher

- Industry: Comics
- Founded: 1988
- Founder: Joseph Naftali
- Defunct: 1994
- Headquarters: New York City
- Key people: Joseph Naftali, president and publisher Steven Lashley, vice president Andrew Murin, editor-in-chief

Continüm Comics was an American comic book publisher which operated between 1988 and 1994. Owned and operated by Joseph Naftali, the company's most successful title was The Dark.

Notable creators who worked for Continüm include George Pérez, Joseph Michael Linsner, Larry Stroman, Mark Bright, Dan Panosian, and Janice Chiang.

== History ==
Established in 1988 in New York City, Continüm published its first tile in 1988, Continüm Presents. In 1990, Continüm rededicated itself to its core titles, The Dark, Foodang, and The Mighty Mites. The company continued until 1994, when it changed its name to August House, Inc.

August House colored other companies' comics and CD-ROMs, and continued to self-publish until 1995. Naftali finally closed the doors on August House when he grew tired of the industry's poor business practices.

== Titles ==
- Continüm Presents (3 issues, 1988–1989)
- The Dark vol. 1 (4 issues, November 1990–June 1992) — adaptation of a character first featured in the 1980s role-playing game Villains and Vigilantes.
- The Dark vol. 2 (7 issues, July 1993–July 1994)
- The Dark Convention Book
- Foodang: Clown with a Gun (1 issue, July 1994)
- The Mighty Mites (1991, 1993)—parody title of Marvel Comics superheroes; acquired from Eternity Comics
