= Emerald Dawn =

1989–1990 limited series comic book

Green Lantern: Emerald Dawn
- Cover to the TPB edition, 1991; Art by M. D. Bright and Klaus Janson

Publication information
- Publisher: DC Comics
- Schedule: Monthly
- Format: Limited series
- Genre: Superhero
- Publication date: December 1989 – May 1990
- No. of issues: 6
- Main character(s): Hal Jordan; Guardians of the Universe

Creative team
- Written by: Jim Owsley (#1); Keith Giffen (plot, #2–6); Gerard Jones (script, #2–6)
- Penciller: M. D. Bright
- Inker: Romeo Tanghal
- Letterer: Albert DeGuzman
- Colorist: Anthony Tollin
- Editor: Andy Helfer

Collected editions
- Green Lantern: Emerald Dawn: ISBN 0-930289-88-9
- Green Lantern: Emerald Dawn II: ISBN 1401200168
- Green Lantern: Hal Jordan Vol. 1: ISBN 978-1401265755

Green Lantern: Emerald Dawn is a 1989–1990 comic book limited series published by DC Comics. The series retold the origins of Hal Jordan and how he became a Green Lantern in post-Crisis continuity. It is created by Keith Giffen and Gerard Jones, with the first issue written by Jim Owsley.

== Emerald Dawn II ==
Green Lantern: Emerald Dawn II is the sequel to Green Lantern: Emerald Dawn. It was published from April to September 1991. This series explores what happened during Jordan's 90-day jail sentence, when he was taken under training by Sinestro.

== Green Lantern: Secret Origin ==
Certain aspects and events of Emerald Dawn have been retconned by the 2008 arc Secret Origin, written by Geoff Johns.

== Collected editions ==
Green Lantern: Emerald Dawn was first reprinted with newsprint-type paper and cheaper priced trade paperbacks in 1991 with new cover art by M. D. Bright and Klaus Janson. It was later collected as trade paperback once again in 2003 with a brand-new cover by Alan Davis and Mark Farmer (ISBN 0930289889).

Green Lantern: Emerald Dawn II was collected for the first time as a trade paperback in 2003 with new cover art by Alan Davis and Mark Farmer (ISBN 1401200168). This book is currently out of print.

Green Lantern: Hal Jordan Vol. 1 (2017) trade paperback collects both Green Lantern: Emerald Dawn #1-6 and Green Lantern: Emerald Dawn II #1-6 in a single volume for the first time in chronological order (ISBN 978-1-4012-657-5-5).
