= Xero (comics) =

Xerø

Publication information
- Publisher: DC Comics
- First appearance: Xero #1, (May 1997)
- Created by: Christopher Priest (writer); ChrisCross (artist)

In-story information
- Alter ego: Coltrane "Trane" Walker
- Team affiliations: Closers
- Abilities: Ability to phase, see through walls.

Xero (usually lettered as Xerø) is a fictional superhero and antihero published by DC Comics. He first appeared in Xero #1, (May 1997), and was created by Christopher Priest and ChrisCross.

== Publication history ==
The character of Xero starred in his own self-titled series that was published for 12 issues by DC Comics in 1997 and 1998.

== Fictional character biography ==
The character's public identity is Coltrane "Trane" Walker, an African-American professional basketball player. He operates secretly as a technologically enhanced "closer" – an agent who can be counted on to tie up loose ends in espionage operations, including the elimination of witnesses – in the guise of a masked, blond, white man, code-named "Xero". The series deals with the protagonist's development of a conscience.

=== Current Status ===
Unusually for a comic set in an established publisher-owned universe, "Xerø" was half creator-owned: though all the characters featured in the book belong to DC Comics, Priest co-owns copyright to the stories and art. The series had limited interaction with the rest of the DCU; Doctor Polaris made a guest appearance during the crossover event "Genesis", but Xerø did not appear in any other DC comics. Although intended to be an ongoing series, sales were weak and DC cancelled it. Priest quickly brought the story to its conclusion in the last issue.

== Reception ==
Singer
Zawlacki
Suggs
