= Marvel Universe Cards =

Trading card series

- Type: Trading cards
- Manufacturer: Impel / SkyBox
- Available: 1990–1994

Marvel Universe Cards are collectible trading cards based on the characters and events of the Marvel Universe.

The first series was published by Impel in 1990. The cards featured categories such as Super Heroes, Super Villains, Rookies, Famous Battles and Team Pictures. Two years later, Impel negotiated with DC Comics to publish DC Cosmic Cards.

== Series I - 1990 ==
This set consisted of 162 base cards, with the last card being the checklist, as well as five Holograms, for a total of 167 cards. On the front of each card in the 1990 series, a character or event was featured.

This series offered several things that future series would not include. Such features were the 12 "Spider-Man Presents:" cards. In these cards, Spider-Man would conduct a humorous interview with other characters in the Marvel Universe, such as Doctor Doom, Doctor Octopus, the Hulk, Silver Surfer, Thor, the Punisher, Magneto, Captain America, Dr. Strange, Iron Man, Wolverine and Spider-Man. This is also the only series that offered nicknames, win–loss records, and a trading card of Stan Lee.

Other categories in the series included Super Heroes, Super Villains, Rookies, Famous Battle, Most Valuable Comics and Team Pictures. In Series I, unique to this series, characters could have multiple cards in the same category. For example, Spider-Man has three cards under the Super Hero category (Cosmic Spider-Man, his Symbiote Costume and the Classic Spider-Man).

This set also came with an exclusive binder.

=== Hologram Cards ===
- MH1: Cosmic Spider-Man
- MH2: Magneto
- MH3: Silver Surfer
- MH4: Wolverine
- MH5: Spider-Man vs. Green Goblin

=== Promo Cards ===
Several uncut promo cards were distributed in Previews magazine.

- (cards 63-139-125-136; Previews #21, September 1990)
- (cards 57-62-83-82; Previews #22, October 1990)
- (cards 39-8-3-32; Previews #23, November 1990)
- (cards 29-6-78-60; Previews #24, December 1990)
- (cards 100-89-96-87; Previews #25, January 1991)

== Series II - 1991 ==
This set consisted of 162 base cards, with the last card being the checklist, as well as five Holograms, for a total of 167 cards.

In this series, win-loss records were removed in favor of having Power Ratings. Each attribute, such as Speed, Stamina, Intelligence, Strength, Agility and Durability was rated for each character on a scale of 1 through 7. Series II also included three trading cards explaining what each rating meant. Later, these explanations were simply printed on the inside of the wrapper in which the cards were packaged.

The Famous Battle category was now renamed Arch-Enemies, to highlight particular rivalries as opposed to single confrontations. Spider-Man Presents was also removed. Instead, two new categories were introduced, but would not appear again in the future. These one-time only categories were Legends and Weapons. Legends paid tribute to characters that had died such as Kraven the Hunter or Bucky. Weapons gave a statistical look at weaponry such as Spider-Man's Web Shooters, Wolverine's Claws, Daredevils Billy Club and the Ultimate Nullifier.

The Marvel Universe Series II Hologram Cards (unlike Series I) featured artwork that was different from the feature character's regular card.

There was also an H-1 Spider-Man hologram card autographed by Stan Lee. It was packaged in a tin similar to the factory set and was given out by Marvel at Capital City Sales Conference.

This set also came with an exclusive binder and Impel binder pages.

=== Hologram Cards ===
- H-1: Spider-Man
- H-2: Hulk
- H-3: Punisher
- H-4: Doctor Doom
- H-5: Fantastic Four vs. Mole Man

=== Promo Cards ===
- (6-up panel, cards 1-51-45-X-57-124; 8" x 7-3/8"; Previews magazine)
- (cello pack of Nos. 1-45-51-57-124; slight differences from basic set)
- (4-up panel, Nos. 10-45-1-85; Previews magazine; numbered to 30,000)

== Series III - 1992 ==
This set consisted of 200 base trading cards and five hologram cards. Each hologram was tinted a different color, for example, Wolverine was tinted blue and Hulk was tinted green.

This series did not have the lasting success of the previous two base series, of 1990–1991. Most collectors agree the design, art, and direction took a turn for the worse post 1991; this is evident in the cards' collectability years later. The series did introduce new elements of design. Instead of having the "Did You Know?" fun fact on the back of each card (like series I and II both did), Series III featured a quote from each character.

Several new categories were also introduced. Team-ups (cards displaying interesting pairings of two particular characters), Cosmic Beings (cards showcasing Marvel's all-powerful characters), Origins (cards that focused on specific character origins), and Milestones (cards which emphasized events in the Marvel Universe).

The last card was a checklist and came with a variant. The variant had a white border around the checklist on the back.

The background artwork for the front of each card was an outer space scene which fitted together across adjacent cards.

Limited edition factory tins (numbered to 10,000) were later sold that contained the full set of cards as well as an additional "power ratings" card.

This set also came with an exclusive binder.

=== Hologram Cards ===
- H-1: Hulk
- H-2: Thing
- H-3: Wolverine
- H-4: Venom
- H-5: Ghost Rider

=== 4-card Promo Sheets ===
- Human-Torch, Silver Surfer, Spider-Man, Thanos (card #s 57, 15, 1, 125) (Previews Vol. II, No. 3, March 1992)
- Human-Torch, Silver Surfer, Spider-Man, Thanos (card #s 57, 15, 1, 125) (This sheet is also a Diamond Previews sheet but is larger in width due to extra text on one side giving more promo info.)
- Human-Torch, Silver Surfer, Spider-Man, Thanos (card #s 57, 15, 1, 125) (Limited edition [30,000 made] which contains the Impel logo in grey on the card backs, replacing the Diamond logo)
- Human-Torch, Silver Surfer, Spider-Man, Thanos (card #s 57, 15, 1, 125) (Comics Buyer's Guide Price Guide, April - June 1992 - contains the CBPG logo in grey on the card backs, replacing the Diamond logo)

=== Promo Cards ===
Several promo cards were distributed in various magazines.

- (Venom hologram) (Advance Comics #40)
- (Venom hologram – Upside-down back) (Advance Comics #40)
- (7" x 8¾", shows cards 57, 15, 1, 125 and promotional text)
- (7" x 8¾", shows cards 57, 15, 1, 125 and promotional text) [Horizontal]
- 1 (Comics Buyer’s Guide Price Guide magazine)
- 54 (Comics Buyer’s Guide Price Guide magazine)

== Series IV - 1993 ==
This set consisted of 180 base cards, with the last card being the checklist. It also had a 9-card red foil chase set featuring characters from the Marvel 2099 comics and a very rare hologram featuring a Spider-Man vs Venom battle (with either red, green, or the highly sought-after blue tint). This card was inserted into 1 out of 180 packs, or 1 in every 5 boxes. This set was noteworthy because the first 135 of the 180 base set cards were portions of larger 9-card pictures. Thus, when the cards were put into standard 9-card sheets, the cards formed a large, contiguous image. There were also 9-cards of "Unsolved Mysteries" such as Wolverine's origin or the identity of the 6th member of the Infinity Watch. The remaining cards featured famous battles of heroes vs villains as well as heroes vs heroes and a checklist for the last card.

=== Foil Cards ===
- 1-2099: Doom 2099
- 2-2099: Vulture 2099
- 3-2009: Ravage 2099
- 4-2009: Fearmaster
- 5-2009: Spider-Man 2099
- 6-2009: Punisher 2099
- 7-2009: Specialist
- 8-2009: Dethstryk
- 9-2009: Tyger Wylde

=== 3-up Panel, Capital City Conference 1993 (1,200 made) ===
- Doom 2099 / Vulture 2099 / Ravage 2099
  - #761, 895, 942, 955, 988, 1006, 1009, 1014, 1049, 1105, 1120, 1126
- Fearmaster / Spider Man 2099 / Punisher 2099
  - #527, 533, 534, 538, 590, 607, 664, 668, 681, 704, 705, 726
- Specialist / Dethstryk / Tiger Wylde
  - #854, 871, 888, 889, 967, 973, 1041, 1083, 1090, 1148, 1186

=== Hologram Card ===
- H-IV: Spider-Man vs. Venom

=== Promo Cards ===
- 0 Deathlok (Comics Buyer’s Guide Price Guide magazine)
- Silver Sable

== Series V - 1994 ==
This set consisted of 200 base cards with the first 90 cards making up larger 9-card artwork panels. However, these focused on specific comic book crossovers such as Fatal Attractions and Maximum Carnage. The backs of the cards summarized the progression of the plot of the crossover, sometimes related to the character on the front of the card, sometimes not. The remainder of the cards were simply several alphabetic organizations of heroes and villains (including Marvel 2099 cards, which played a more prominent role here) and a checklist for the last card.

For chase cards, this set had four holograms, 10 "suspended animation" cards (characters printed on clear plastic cards, used to promote the animated series running at the time), 6 jumbo "suspended animation" cards, and nine "power blast" cards (foil/holofoil). The power blast cards came in three variants, having gold, silver, or rainbow backgrounds, depending on where the cards were purchased. The holograms came in three variants, red/dark orange tint, green/gold tint, and green/blue tint.

=== Power Blast Cards ===
- 1: Carnage
- 2: Punisher
- 3: Ghost Rider
- 4: Gambit
- 5: Hulk
- 6: Spider-Man
- 7: Iron Man
- 8: Cyclops
- 9: Thing

=== Suspended Animation Cards ===
- 1: Gambit
- 2: Human Torch
- 3: Invisible Woman
- 4: Iron Man
- 5: Silver Surfer
- 6: Spider-Man
- 7: Thing
- 8: Venom
- 9: War Machine
- 10: Wolverine

=== Jumbo Suspended Animation Cards ===
- Gambit
- Iron Man
- Spider-Man
- Thing
- Venom
- Wolverine

=== Hologram Cards ===
- 1: Spider-Man
- 2: Wolverine
- 3: War Machine
- 4: Silver Surfer

=== Promo Cards ===
Several uncut promo cards were distributed in various magazines.

- Exploding in August! (9-card panel; 7½" x 10½")
- Exploding in August! (9-card panel, perforated; 7½" x 10½")
- Sabretooth/Rogue/Hawkeye/Punisher (4-card panel, 5" x 7"; Tuff Stuff's Collect!, Aug 1994 and Cards Illustrated Magazine #9)
- Wolverine/Iron Man/Spider-Man/Cable (4-card panel, 5" x 7")
- (2-card panel, 2½" x 7"; ProAction Magazine; cards 130-98)
- (4-card panel, 5" x 7" perforated, cards 124-130-155-92; Spider-Man Magazine #5)
- (4-card panel, 5" x 7" perforated, cards 19-157-153-131; Spider-Man Magazine #6)
