= Christopher Priest (comic book writer) =

American comic book writer (born 1961)

The Reverend Christopher Priest
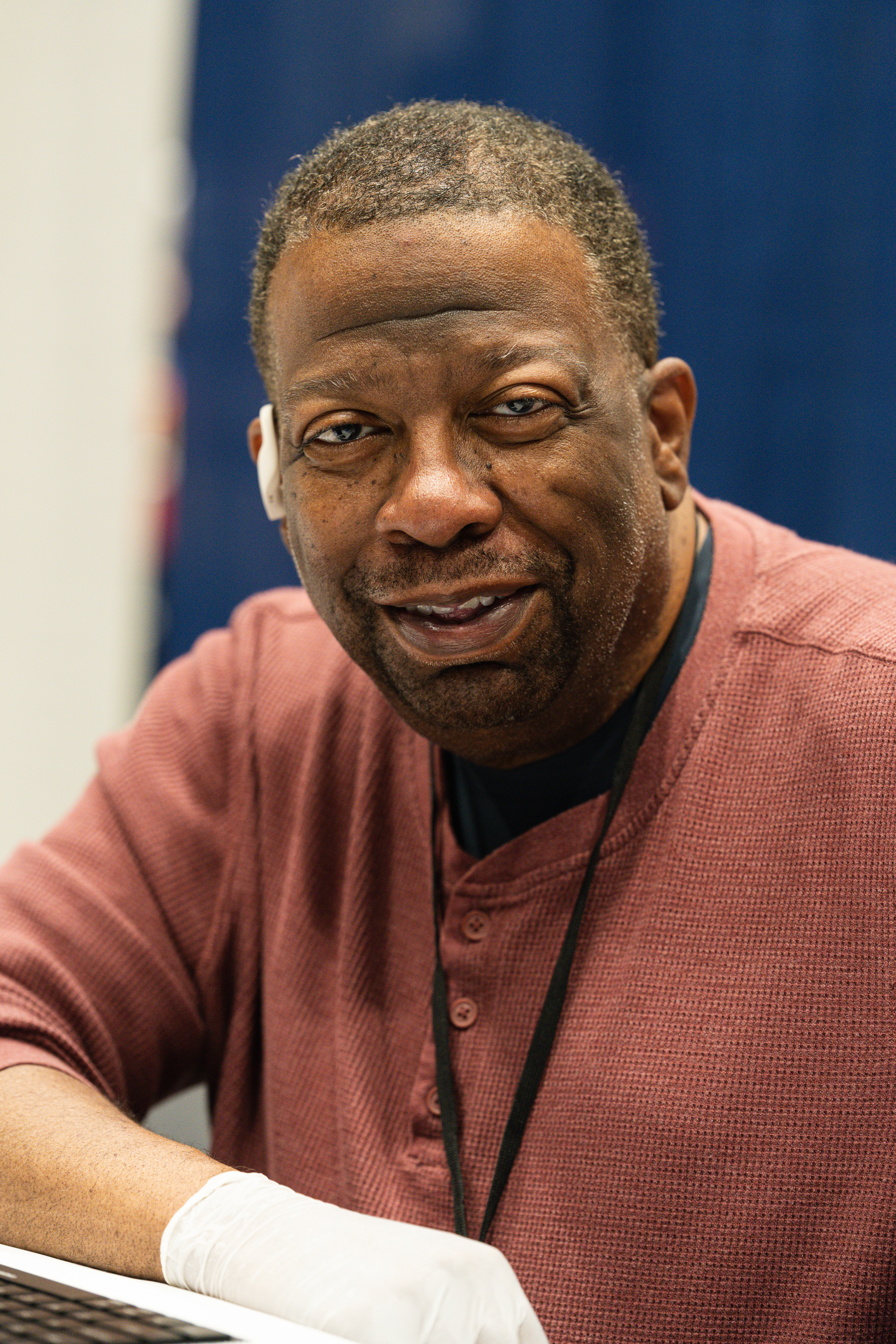
- Priest at GalaxyCon Oklahoma City in 2026
- Born: James Christopher Owsley; June 30, 1961 (age 65) Queens, New York, U.S.
- Areas: Writer, Editor
- Pseudonym: Priest
- Awards: Inkpot Award (2016)

Christopher James Priest (born James Christopher Owsley /ˈaʊzli/, June 30, 1961) is an American comic book writer who is at times credited simply as Priest. He changed his name legally circa 1993. He was the first black writer-editor in mainstream comics.

== Comics writing ==
An urban Gospel song recorded by Priest in 1985 (then known as Jim Owsley). Although best known for comics writing, he has pursued music and Christian ministry for decades.

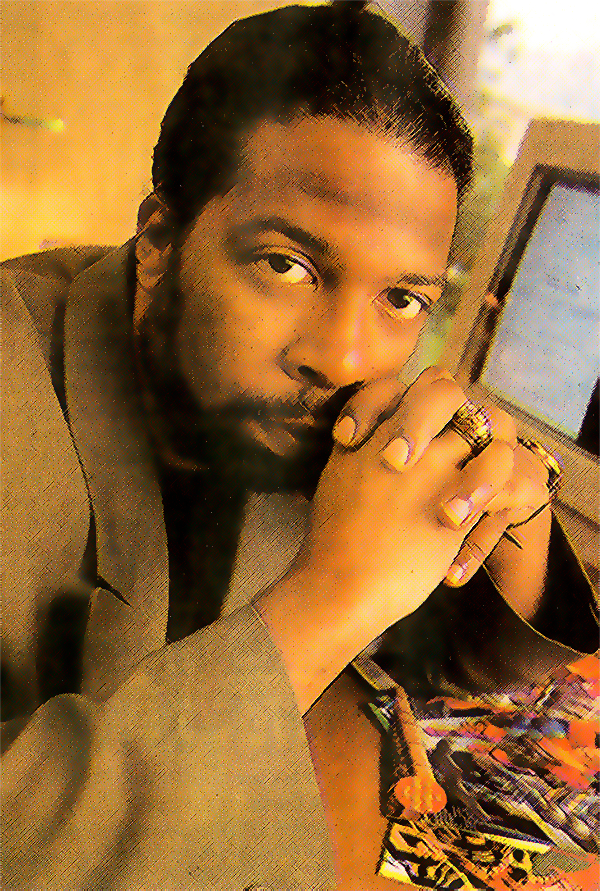
Priest in the 1990s

Priest (as Jim Owsley) entered the comics industry as a Marvel Comics intern in 1978. He joined Marvel's editorial staff in 1979, working for Paul Laikin as a managing editor on Crazy Magazine and becoming the first African American editor in mainstream comics. He next became assistant editor for Larry Hama on the Conan titles.

Owsley made his professional debut as a writer in 1983 with issue No. 1 of The Falcon miniseries and was made full editor of the Spider-Man comic books from 1985 to 1986. Professional and personal disagreements eventually led to his leaving Marvel. Owsley's writing tenure on Power Man and Iron Fist concluded with Iron Fist's controversial death.

Moving to DC Comics, Owsley had a run as writer of Green Lantern when the character was exclusive to the anthology series Action Comics Weekly from 1988 to 1989. Owsley wrote the Green Lantern serial issues #601–607, left part way through a story arc and then returned for issues #621–635. He worked with artists Gil Kane and Tod Smith during his first run, and then upon his return, with artist M. D. Bright. Owsley wrote two Green Lantern Specials, the second issue concluding the plots left off from the end of Action Comics Weekly, with Bright drawing. They worked together again on the first issue of Green Lantern: Emerald Dawn before Owsley departed. He edited several titles in DC Comics' Impact Comics imprint from 1991 to 1993.

As a writer, Owsley/Priest worked on the series Conan the Barbarian, King Conan, The Ray, Steel, Deadpool, and Black Panther vol. 3. He co-created the series Quantum and Woody, Xero, and The Crew, among others.

In 1993, he became part of the group of writers and artists that launched Milestone Media, a comic book publisher affiliated with DC Comics. He has said he was intended to become the company's editor-in-chief, but personal problems forced him to scale down his involvement to liaison between DC and Milestone. During this period, he co-created the character Static, among others.

Shortly afterward, he changed his name from "Jim Owsley" to "Christopher Priest" for reasons he has not discussed publicly other than in one remark in an interview about becoming a priest if his marriage, which later ended in divorce, did not last. During Owsley's Green Lantern run, prior to his name change, he introduced a character named Priest. He has stated he was unaware of the British science fiction novelist Christopher Priest. He refers to himself professionally as either the mononym "Priest" or "Christopher J. Priest".

After a decade-long absence from comics, he returned in 2014–2015 to write a Quantum and Woody miniseries for Valiant Comics. He was chosen to write the DC Rebirth version of Deathstroke in 2016. He became the writer for Justice League in December 2017, but was replaced by Scott Snyder in 2018. Priest contributed a story to the Black Panther Annual No. 1, released in February 2018. In 2019 he wrote Vampirella for Dynamite Comics and U.S. Agent for Marvel Comics.

== Music ==
Priest is a singer-songwriter and multi-instrumentalist music producer who has written and produced dozens of tracks for himself and others. Streetwise, Priest's first solo album, recorded under the stage name "Hollis Stone," was released on vinyl on March 3, 1981. It featured a cover photo by Eliot R. Brown of the then-Jim Owsley standing in front of the Marvel Comics office building at 575 Madison Avenue.

In 1993, Priest co-produced Live! Minister Darryl Cherry and the Covenant Mass Choir (RWM-4445), a full concert multitrack recording featuring an 85-voice choir and 10-piece band including Priest playing bass guitar on two selections. The album was recorded before a live concert audience in New Brunswick, New Jersey.

== Personal life ==
Priest is an ordained Baptist minister, and maintains an extensive archive of progressive Christian ecumenical essays on his website PraiseNet.Org. Priest resides in Denver, Colorado.

== Awards ==
Christopher Priest received an Inkpot Award in 2016.

== Bibliography ==
=== Comics ===
==== Regular writer ====
- The Marvel No-Prize Book #1 (Marvel Comics, January 1983) – (one-shot)
- Falcon #1–4 (Marvel Comics, November 1983 – February 1984)
- The Further Adventures of Indiana Jones #20–22 (Marvel Comics, August 1984 – October 1984)
- Power Man and Iron Fist #111–125 (Marvel Comics, November 1984 – September 1986)
- Conan the Barbarian #172–185, 187–213 (Marvel Comics, July 1985 – December 1988) – (co-writer #202–213)
- Conan the Barbarian King-Size Annual #8, 10–12 (Marvel Comics, 1983, 1985–1987)
- Conan the King #50–55 (Marvel Comics, January 1989 – November 1989)
- The Amazing Spider-Man #284–288 (Marvel Comics, January 1987 – May 1987)
- Spider-Man vs. Wolverine #1 (Marvel Comics, February 1987) – (one-shot)
- Action Comics Weekly #601–607 (DC Comics, May 24, 1988 – July 5, 1988) – (Green Lantern story)
- Green Lantern Special #1–2 (DC Comics, 1988–1989)
- "I, Whom the Gods Would Destroy." Marvel Graphic Novel #33 (Marvel Comics, 1988) – (Thor story)
- Action Comics Weekly #621–635 (DC Comics, October 11, 1988 – January 17, 1989) – (Green Lantern story; co-writer)
- The Unknown Soldier #1–12 (DC Comics, Winter 1988 – December 1989) – (limited series)
- Green Lantern: Emerald Dawn #1 (DC Comics, January 1989) – (mini-series)
- The Ray #1–28 (DC Comics, May 1994 – August 1996)
- Justice League Task Force #18–37 (DC Comics, December 1994 – August 1996)
- The Ray Annual #1 (DC Comics, 1995)
- Triumph #1–4 (DC Comics, June 1995 – September 1995) – (mini-series)
- Doom Link (DC Comics, 1995) – (Superman and Batman Elseworlds one-shot)
- Hawkman vol. 3 #31–33 (DC Comics, April 1996 – June 1996)
- Total Justice #1–3 (DC Comics, October 1996 – November 1996) – (mini-series)
- Steel #34–52 (DC Comics, January 1997 – July 1998)
- Wonder Woman Plus #1 (DC Comics, January 1997) – (with Jesse Quick; one-shot)
- Xero #1–12 (DC Comics, May 1997 – April 1998)
- Quantum and Woody #1–21 (Acclaim Comics, June 1997 – February 2000)
- JLX Unleashed #1 (Marvel Comics, June 1997) – (one-shot)
- Solar, Man of the Atom: Hell on Earth #1–4 (Acclaim Comics [Valiant], January 1998 – April 1998) – (limited series)
- Concrete Jungle: The Legend of the Black Lion #1 (Acclaim Comics, April 1998) – (one-shot)
- Ka-Zar #14–17 (Marvel Comics, June 1998 – September 1998)
- GOAT: H.A.E.D.U.S. #1 (Acclaim Comics, August 1998) – (one-shot)
- Wonder Woman #137–138, 1,000,000 (DC Comics, September 1998 – November 1998)
- Black Panther vol. 3 #1–56, 59–62 (Marvel Comics, November 1998 – May 2003, July 2003 – September 2003)
- Turok/Shadowman #1 (Acclaim Comics, February 1999) – (one-shot)
- Impulse: Bart Saves the Universe #1 (DC Comics, March 1999) – (one-shot)
- Deadpool #34–41, 43–45 (Marvel Comics, November 1999 – June 2000, August 2000 – October 2000)
- Batman: The Hill #1 (DC Comics, May 2000) – (one-shot)
- Legends of the DC Universe #30–32 (DC Comics, July 2000 – September 2000) – (Wonder Woman story)
- The Crew #1–7 (Marvel Comics, July 2003 – January 2004)
- Captain America and the Falcon #1–14 (Marvel Comics, May 2004 – June 2005)
- Q2: The Return of Quantum and Woody #1–5 (Valiant Entertainment, October 2014 – February 2015)
- Deathstroke vol. 4 #1–50 (DC Comics, August 2016 – December 2019)
- Inhumans: Once and Future Kings #1–5 (Marvel Comics, August 2017 – October 2017)
- Justice League vol. 3 #34–43 (DC Comics, December 2017 – April 2018)
- Spider-Force #1–3 (Marvel Comics, October 2018 – December 2018)
- Vampirella #1–25 (Dynamite Entertainment, July 2019 – November 2021)
- U.S.Agent #1–5 (Marvel Comics, November 2020 – April 2021)
- Black Adam #1–12 (DC Comics, August 2022 – August 2023)
- Vampirella: Year One #1–6 (Dynamite Entertainment, July 2022 – March 2023)
- Superman: Lost #1–10 (DC Comics, May 2023 – March 2024)

==== Fill-in writer ====
- Marvel Team-Up #141 (Marvel Comics, May 1984)
- Power Man and Iron Fist #108 (Marvel Comics, August 1984) – (co-writer)
- Peter Parker, the Spectacular Spider-Man #105–106 (Marvel Comics, August 1985 – September 1985) – (co-writer)
- Peter Parker, the Spectacular Spider-Man #111 (Marvel Comics, February 1986) – (Secret Wars II crossover)
- Amazing High Adventure "The Conquest of Kiurkan" #2 (Marvel Comics, September 1985)
- Daredevil #224 (Marvel Comics, November 1985)
- Moon Knight vol. 2 #6 (Marvel Comics, December 1985)
- The Savage Sword of Conan
- "The Beast." The Savage Sword of Conan #91 (Marvel Comics, August 1983)
- "The Chain!" The Savage Sword of Conan #91 (Marvel Comics, August 1983)
- "One Night at the Maul." The Savage Sword of Conan #99 (Marvel Comics, April 1984)
- "The Vezek Inn." The Savage Sword of Conan #109 (Marvel Comics, February 1985)
- "At the Altar of the Goat God." The Savage Sword of Conan #125 (Marvel Comics, June 1986) – (co-writer)
- "Curse of the Ageless Ones!" The Savage Sword of Conan #128 (Marvel Comics, September 1986)
- Thor #370 (Marvel Comics, August 1986)
- Peter Parker, the Spectacular Spider-Man Annual #7 (Marvel Comics, 1987)
- Web of Spider-Man #29–30 (Marvel Comics, August 1987 – September 1987)
- Daredevil #246 (Marvel Comics, September 1987)
- Web of Spider-Man #37 (Marvel Comics, April 1988)
- "Phantasm." The Savage Sword of Conan #153 (Marvel Comics, October 1988)
- "The Secret Origin of Green Lantern." Secret Origins #36 (DC Comics, January 1989)
- Batman #431–432 (DC Comics, March 1989 – April 1989)
- "Brothers." The Savage Sword of Conan #160 (Marvel Comics, May 1989)
- Batman Annual #13 (DC Comics, 1989)
- "The Sting." Marvel Super-Heroes vol. 3 #13 (Marvel Comics, April 1993) – (Iron Man story)
- "Checkmate." Marvel Super-Heroes vol. 3 #13 (Marvel Comics, April 1993) – (Iron Man story)
- Black Canary #8 (DC Comics, August 1993)
- Wonder Woman #88–89 (DC Comics, July 1994 – August 1994)
- Justice League America #92 (DC Comics, September 1994) – (Zero Hour crossover)
- Justice League International #68 (DC Comics, September 1994) – (Zero Hour crossover)
- Justice League Task Force #16 (DC Comics, September 1994) – (Zero Hour crossover)
- Catwoman Annual #1 (DC Comics, 1994) – (Elseworlds story)
- Superman: The Man of Steel Annual #3 (DC Comics, 1994) – (Elseworlds story)
- Solar, Man of the Atom #44–45 (Acclaim Comics [Valiant], May 1995 – June 1995)
- Judge Dredd #16–17 (DC Comics, November 1995 – December 1995)
- Showcase '96 #2 (DC Comics, February 1996) – (Circe story)
- "Huntress: Exposure." The Batman Chronicles #4 (DC Comics, Spring 1996) – (Huntress story)
- Justice League America Annual No. 10 (DC Comics, 1996)
- "Hammered." Team Superman Secret Files #1 (DC Comics, May 1998) – (one-shot)
- "Revelations." JLA 80-Page Giant #1 (DC Comics, July 1998) – (Aquaman and Wonder Woman story)
- "The Professional." The Flash 80 Page Giant #1 (DC Comics, August 1998) – (Jesse Quick story)
- "Heroes." JLA Secret Files #2 (DC Comics, August 1998)
- Legends of the DC Universe #12–13 (DC Comics, January 1999 – February 1999) – (Justice League of America story)
- "Phases." Green Lantern 80 Page Giant #2 (DC Comics, June 1999)
- "The Game." JLA 80-Page Giant #2 (DC Comics, November 1999)
- Hourman #20 (DC Comics, November 2000)
- The Incredible Hulk vol. 3 #33 (Marvel Comics, December 2001)
- "Masks." Marvel Double-Shot #2 (Marvel Comics, February 2003) – (Doctor Doom story)
- Thor vol. 2 #59 (Marvel Comics, April 2003)

=== Prose ===
==== Fiction ====
- Green Lantern: Sleepers Vol. 1 and 2 (Plot outline only. (Ibooks, Inc./Simon & Schuster 2005)
- Green Lantern: Sleepers Vol. 3 (Ibooks, Inc. First Edition: September 1, 2005, ISBN 1596871032)
- Zion: A Love Story (Lamercie Park LLC, 2015 ASIN: B00O08L9C6)
- Dual: A Love Story (Lamercie Park LLC, 2015 ASIN: B00S7EKGKA)
- 1999 (Lamercie Park LLC, 2015 Serialized as four novellas)

==== Nonfiction ====
- Klang! A Writer's Commentary (Lamercie Park LLC, 2015 ASIN: B014RP35KU)
- Black Faith 101 (Lamercie Park LLC, 2014 ASIN: B00QJ09DGC)
- Fear of A Black Church: Why The Black Church Looks Nothing Like Christ (Lamercie Park LLC, 2014 ASIN: B00O03PALM)
- The Levite's Concubine: Women And The African American Church (Lamercie Park LLC, 2014 ASIN: B00O0ATRXM)
- The Glass House: 10 Reasons Your Church Is Not Growing (Lamercie Park LLC, 2014 ASIN: B00O80HVPK)
- Sex & The Single Christian (Lamercie Park LLC, 2014 ASIN: B00O8ZSBOA)
- LGBT: In The Name of God: The Church's Response to The LGBT Community (with Benjamin L. Reynolds, M.Div. Lamercie Park LLC, 2015 ASIN: B00QQHILDO)
- The Essential Black Church: Seventy-Five Theses Challenging Our Tradition (Lamercie Park LLC, 2015 ASIN: B00TE9PB7A)

== Discography ==
- Streetwise, Hollis Stone (1981, Sonfire/New Witness NW001)
- White Soul, Hollis Stone (1982 Phonogram Ltd/Lamercie Park)
- A Mighty Fortress Is Our God / The Wedding Song, Hollis Stone (Single, 1985 Phonogram Ltd/Lamercie Park)
- Girls, Hollis Stone (1986 Phonogram Ltd/Lamercie Park)
- Stop!, Nita Marshal (Producer: Hollis Stone, 1986 Phonogram Ltd/Lamercie Park)
- Pandora's Box, Hollis Stone (1987 Phonogram Ltd/Lamercie Park)
- Night & Day, Twynn (Producer: Hollis Stone, 1993 Grace Phonogram Entertainment/Lamercie Park)
- Minister Darryl Cherry & The Covenant Mass Choir: Live!, Minister Darryl Cherry & The Covenant Mass Choir (Producer: Christopher Priest, 1993/Released 2004 Relevant Praise RWM-4445)
- Nadine's Diary, Nadia (Producer: Priest, 2000 Grace Phonogram Entertainment/Relevant Praise/Lamercie Park, RWM-4447)

Preceded by Kurt Busiek	Power Man and Iron Fist writer 1984–1986	Succeeded by Fred Van Lente
Preceded by Michael Fleisher	Conan the Barbarian writer 1985–1988 (with Val Semeiks in 1988)	Succeeded by Val Semeiks; Charles Santino
Preceded by Tom DeFalco	The Amazing Spider-Man writer 1987	Succeeded by David Michelinie
Preceded by Bob Haney (in 1982)	Unknown Soldier writer 1988–1989	Succeeded by Garth Ennis (in 1997)
Preceded by Jack C. Harris	The Ray writer 1994–1996	Succeeded by Justin Gray; Jimmy Palmiotti
Preceded by Mark Waid	Justice League Task Force writer 1995–1996	Succeeded by n/a
Preceded by Louise Simonson	Steel writer 1997–1998	Succeeded by n/a
Preceded by Mark Waid	Ka-Zar writer 1998	Succeeded by Paul Jenkins
Preceded by Don McGregor	Black Panther writer 1998–2003	Succeeded by Reginald Hudlin
Preceded by Joe Kelly	Deadpool writer 1999–2000	Succeeded by Jimmy Palmiotti
Preceded by James Bonny	Deathstroke writer 2016–2020	Succeeded by Joshua Williamson (Deathstroke, Inc)
Preceded by Bryan Hitch	Justice League writer 2018	Succeeded by Scott Snyder
