= Solo Avengers =

1987 American comic book series

- Cover of Solo Avengers #1 (December 1987). Art by Mark Bright and Joe Rubinstein.

Publication information
- Publisher: Marvel Comics
- Schedule: Monthly
- Format: Ongoing series
- Publication date: December 1987 – July 1989 (as Solo Avengers); August 1989 – January 1991 (as Avengers Spotlight)
- No. of issues: 40 (#1–20 as Solo Avengers, #21–40 as Avengers Spotlight)
- Main characters: Hawkeye various Avengers

Creative team
- Written by: List: Mike W. Barr, John Byrne, D. G. Chichester, Chris Claremont, Margaret Clark, Tom DeFalco, J. M. DeMatteis, Danny Fingeroth, Steve Gerber, Peter B. Gillis, Glenn Herdling, Len Kaminski, Bob Layton, Ralph Macchio, Howard Mackie, Dennis Mallonee, Dwayne McDuffie, Dan Mishkin, Lou Mougin, Fabian Nicieza, Sandy Plunkett, Roger Stern, Dann Thomas, Roy Thomas, Gregory Wright, Dwight Jon Zimmerman
- Penciller: List: Larry Alexander, Tom Artis, M. D. Bright, June Brigman, James Brock, Greg Capullo, Dave Cockrum, Amanda Conner, Gavin Curtis, Alan Davis, Kieron Dwyer, Tom Grindberg, Jackson Guice, Bob Hall, Don Heck, Dan Lawlis, Bob Layton, Jim Lee, Ron Lim, Al Milgrom, Tom Morgan, Don Perlin, Rodney Ramos, Sandy Plunkett, John Ridgway, Paul Ryan, Dwayne Turner, Jim Valentino, Lee Weeks, Ron Wilson
- Inker: List: Jack Abel, Jeff Albrecht, Steve Buccellato, Kim DeMulder, Stan Drake, Tim Dzon, Jackson Guice, Scott Hampton, Doug Hazlewood, Don Heck, Donald Hudson, Chris Ivy, Karl Kesel, Bob Layton, José Marzan Jr., Mark McKenna, Bob McLeod, Tom Morgan, Win Mortimer, Dan Panosian, Roy Richardson, John Ridgway, Josef Rubinstein, Lee Weeks, Keith Williams, Al Williamson
- Editor: Mark Gruenwald

Solo Avengers was an American comic book series published by Marvel Comics, and was a spin-off from the company's superhero team title The Avengers. It was published for 20 issues (December 1987–July 1989) until it was renamed Avengers Spotlight with issue #21 (August 1989). The series was cancelled as of issue #40 (January 1991).

The format of the title was usually two stories, one featuring the character Hawkeye and the other a back-up strip showcasing a current or former member of the Avengers. With issue #35, the format changed to exclusively focus on one full-length story.

Artist Amanda Conner's first published work in the comics industry was the 11–page Yellowjacket back-up story in Solo Avengers #12 (November 1988).

== Solo Avengers ==
| Issue | Character | Character | Cover date |
|---|---|---|---|
| #1 | Hawkeye | Mockingbird | December 1987 |
| #2 | Hawkeye | Captain Marvel | January 1988 |
| #3 | Hawkeye | Moon Knight | February 1988 |
| #4 | Hawkeye | Black Knight | March 1988 |
| #5 | Hawkeye | Scarlet Witch | April 1988 |
| #6 | Hawkeye | Falcon | May 1988 |
| #7 | Hawkeye | Black Widow | June 1988 |
| #8 | Hawkeye | Hank Pym | July 1988 |
| #9 | Hawkeye | Hellcat | August 1988 |
| #10 | Hawkeye | Doctor Druid | September 1988 |
| #11 | Hawkeye | Hercules | October 1988 |
| #12 | Hawkeye | Yellowjacket | November 1988 |
| #13 | Hawkeye | Wonder Man | December 1988 |
| #14 | Hawkeye | She-Hulk | January 1989 |
| #15 | Hawkeye | Wasp | February 1989 |
| #16 | Hawkeye | Moondragon | March 1989 |
| #17 | Hawkeye | Namor | April 1989 |
| #18 | Hawkeye | Moondragon | May 1989 |
| #19 | Hawkeye | Black Panther | June 1989 |
| #20 | Hawkeye | Moondragon | July 1989 |

== Avengers Spotlight ==
| Issue | Character | Character | Cover date |
|---|---|---|---|
| #21 | Hawkeye | Starfox | August 1989 |
| #22 | Hawkeye | Swordsman | September 1989 |
| #23 | Hawkeye | Vision | October 1989 |
| #24 | Hawkeye | Firebird | November 1989 |
| #25 | Hawkeye | Rick Jones | November 1989 |
| #26 | Hawkeye | Iron Man | December 1989 |
| #27 | Hawkeye | Black Widow, Captain Marvel, Hellcat, Moondragon, Firebird, Stingray | December 1989 |
| #28 | Hawkeye | Wonder Man, Wasp | January 1990 |
| #29 | Hawkeye | Iron Man | February 1990 |
| #30 | Hawkeye | | March 1990 |
| #31 | Hawkeye | U.S. Agent | April 1990 |
| #32 | Hawkeye | U.S. Agent | May 1990 |
| #33 | Hawkeye | U.S. Agent | June 1990 |
| #34 | Hawkeye | U.S. Agent | July 1990 |
| #35 | Gilgamesh | | August 1990 |
| #36 | Hawkeye | | September 1990 |
| #37 | Doctor Druid | | October 1990 |
| #38 | Tigra | | November 1990 |
| #39 | Black Knight | | December 1990 |
| #40 | Vision | | January 1991 |

== Avengers: Solo ==
In December 2011, a five-part limited series titled Avengers: Solo was released following the same format as Solo Avengers. Once again, the central story, written by Jen Van Meter and illustrated by Roger Robinson, starred Hawkeye with the cast of Avengers Academy, by Jim McCann and Clayton Harris, in the back-up story.

== Collected editions ==
- Avengers: Solo Avengers Classic collects Solo Avengers #1–10, 240 pages, February 2012, ISBN 978-0785159032
- Avengers: Scarlet Witch includes the Scarlet Witch story from Solo Avengers #5, 232 pages, April 2015, ISBN 978-0785193357
- Hawkeye Epic Collection: The Way Of The Arrow collects Solo Avengers #1-20 and Avengers Spotlight #21, October 2023, ISBN 9781302953348
- Hawkeye Epic Collection: Marked for Death collects Avengers Spotlight #22-40 and material from Marvel Comics Presents vol. 1 #83, December 2025, ISBN 9781302965198
