= Quantum and Woody =

Superhero duo from the Valiant comic book

- Textless cover of Quantum and Woody (volume 2) #1, art by Ryan Sook.

Publication information
- Publisher: Valiant Comics
- Schedule: Monthly
- Format: Ongoing series
- Genre: Superhero
- Publication date: (Valiant Comics); June 1997 – January 2000 (Valiant Entertainment); July 2013
- No. of issues: 50
- Main character: Eric Percy Henderson / Quantum; Woodrow "Woody" Henderson / Woody; Vincent Van Goat

Creative team
- Created by: Christopher Priest; M. D. Bright

Quantum and Woody is a superhero duo from the Valiant comic book series created by writer Christopher Priest and illustrator M. D. Bright.

Editor Fabian Nicieza called Priest because he wanted a buddy super-hero book similar to Power Man and Iron Fist. Priest then suggested they use the artist of that series, Bright. Originally reluctant to work on this, Bright suggested they make the white character the comic relief for once. Drawing inspiration from the characters played by Woody Harrelson and Wesley Snipes in White Men Can't Jump, they created Quantum & Woody.

In 2013, Valiant Comics began publishing a re-imagined version of the characters.

== Publication history ==
=== Acclaim Comics ===
==== Volume 1 ====
The first volume of Quantum and Woody was published by Acclaim Comics for 17 issues beginning in June 1997 and ending in October 1998. It returned for five issues released between September 1999 and January 2000.

=== Valiant Entertainment ===
==== Volume 2 ====
In March 2013, Valiant Entertainment released a teaser signaling the return of Quantum and Woody, stating "The World's Greatest Comic Company Presents...The World's Worst Superhero Team".

On March 26, a new series written by James Asmus with art by Tom Fowler was announced, later receiving July release date. The characters in the new series are re-imagined and do not continue the story line of the previous series. The series lasted 13 issues. Priest and Bright returned to produce a five-issue miniseries featuring the original Quantum and Woody, set 20 years after the last issue of the original series. The series was released on November 12, 2014. The duo were later teamed up with Archer & Armstrong for a 4 issue miniseries called The Delinquents.

==== Volume 3 ====
After a couple of years inactive, the duo were brought back for a new series written by Daniel Kibblesmith, starting in late 2017 and ending after 12 issues.

==== Volume 4 ====
A new miniseries was launched in 2020, written by Christopher Hastings with art by Ryan Browne.

== Fictional character biography ==
In the version of Quantum and Woody published by the 2010s incarnation of Valiant Entertainment, Eric Henderson and Woodrow ("Woody") Van Chelton are adoptive brothers. After years of estrangement they are brought together by the mysterious death of their father (Woody's foster father). They set out to find their father's killer and, in the course of their investigation, are accidentally imbued with powers.

Straitlaced and Eric Henderson always strove for a life of disciplined achievement—in school, in the Army and in his career. In contrast, Woody, has been irresponsible and undisciplined, living on the streets and leading a life of petty crime. When their father Derek is killed at his top-secret experimental energy lab, the brothers reconnect at the funeral which leads to a fistfight and resultant jailtime.

Distraught, suspected of murder, and determined to bring the real killers to justice, Eric and Woody decide to investigate the crime themselves, despite having no qualifications for doing so. They break into Derek's lab to gather clues, but they accidentally activate a machine which emits strange energy to which they are exposed before causing a massive explosion. Miraculously, they survive and moreover, they possess the ability to shoot energy and generate shields of pure power. However, another result requires them to slam their metal wristbands to each other's every 24 hours to avoid being dissolved.

Utilizing their unstable energy powers, Eric and Woody learn of a mysterious group, Edison's Radical Acquisitions (ERA), which was seeking Dr. Henderson's research. Woody convinces Eric that they could find out more about Derek's secret science by snooping around in superhero equipment stolen from Eric's job at private security contractor Magnum Security. Calling themselves Quantum and Woody, the duo infiltrate an ERA gathering in Washington, DC, but Woody is subdued and taken hostage. As Quantum, Eric tracks ERA to an island base brimming with pilfered scientific secrets, mad scientists, robots, and genetic experiments.

ERA's decrepit matriarch is a geneticist known only as the Crone. She has prolonged her life for decades by harvesting parts from clones. She conducts experiments on Woody in an attempt to unlock the secrets of his power. Eric frees Woody, but they accidentally destroy the island, barely surviving and accompanied by a mysteriously powerful goat and a teenage Crone-clone named Sixty-Nine.

Because their wristband limitation requires them to remain in close contact, the brothers reconcile, and Woody moves into Eric's apartment. Soon after, Eric is enlisted by his boss, Terrence Magnum, to act as Magnum Security's private superhero. Magnum sends Quantum on a suicide mission to destabilize a white supremacist (and possibly other -ists) movement in Montana, and because the brothers need to remain in close proximity, Woody accompanies him. Discovering that Magnum is only using Eric as a pawn to start a profitable domestic war, Quantum and Woody ally with the separatists to defeat Magnum's goal.

Resettling in Washington, DC, Quantum and Woody notice a sizable increase in the number of robo-crimes reported there, which may be an indication of a return of the ERA.

== Characters ==
=== The Goat ===
The Henderson brothers have not realized it yet, but this curious creature, named Vincent Van Goat by Woody, has a history with their family that goes back many years, back to the days when their father was a lab assistant to the bombastic Dr. Platzhalter. Platzhalter's work aimed to develop a device capable of backing up and restoring the full mind and thought patterns of any chosen subject, a possible cure for Alzheimer's disease or the key to a smarter artificial intelligence. During an impromptu demonstration for the representatives of Edison's Radical Acquisitions, a lab accident resulted in the transfer of a copy of Henderson's mind into the goat. Unaware of what had truly transpired, ERA took the animal into their care and spent the next several years performing unethical scientific upgrades on the Goat. Over time, these experiments entirely changed the Goat's physiology to the point where the true extent of the animal's abilities —including heat vision, enhanced strength, and limited flight —may never be known.

Years later, when Quantum and Woody desperately try to escape the ERA's island headquarters, the Goat recognizes the "heroes" as his "own" wayward sons and rescues them, deploying a terrifying array of combat abilities to wreak havoc throughout the ERA compound. The Goat initiates the island's self-destruct sequence. It goes to live with Eric and Woody to live in Eric's Washington, DC apartment.

Despite the Goat's repeated and non-subtle attempts to let Quantum and Woody know that he is somewhat their father, the duo has yet to realize this. Regardless, the Goat continues to assist them as a significant powerhouse.

=== Original version ===
Eric Henderson is a decorated Army tactical officer. Woodrow Van Chelton is a goofy man with a guitar (but no band). His idea of detective work is hanging a suspect out of a window. They are childhood friends who have lost touch with one another as they entered their teenage years. Reunited after the deaths of their fathers in a suspicious helicopter crash, they begin investigating the fathers' deaths and become victims of a high-tech industrial accident that turns their bodies into pure energy. The metal gauntlets they each wear must be slammed together every 24 hours to reset their energy matrix, or their atoms will break apart and their bodies will fade away. Eric adopts a code name, Quantum, to work undercover and find his father's killer. Woodrow wants to avenge his father's death too, but declares that as "code names are stupid", people can call him Woody.

== In other media ==
=== Television ===
A television series developed by Anthony and Joe Russo and TBS was announced in 2017.

== Awards ==
- 2014 Shortlisted for Excelsior Award for Quantum and Woody vol. 1.

=== Nominations ===
- 2014 Nominated for Harvey Awards
  - Best Writer: James Asmus
  - Best Letterer: Dave Lanphear
  - Most Promising New Talent: James Asmus
  - Best New Series: Quantum and Woody
  - Special Award for Humor in Comics: James Asmus

== Digital publication ==
Valiant Entertainment released every previously published Quantum and Woody issue via Digital Distributor comiXology. The first half arrived on 10/24/2012 while the second arrived a week later. After the initial announcement it was leaked to Bleeding Cool News that two unpublished issues existed and that those issues would be released as well. These issues were not released with the previously published material and no announcement has been made as to their availability.

== Collected editions ==
Title	Material collected	Published date	ISBN
Acclaim Comics
Quantum and Woody by Priest & Bright Vol. 1: Klang	Quantum and Woody (vol. 1) #0–7	September 2015	978-1939346780
Quantum and Woody by Priest & Bright Vol. 2: Switch	Quantum and Woody (vol. 1) #8–13, The Goat: H.A.E.D.U.S. #1	October 2015	978-1939346803
Quantum and Woody by Priest & Bright Vol. 3: And So…	Quantum and Woody (vol. 1) #14–21, 32	November 2015	978-1939346865
Quantum and Woody by Priest & Bright Vol. 4: Q2 – The Return	Q2: The Return of Quantum and Woody #1–5	May 2016	978-1682151099
Complete Quantum and Woody Classic Omnibus	Quantum and Woody (vol. 1) #0–21, 32, The Goat: H.A.E.D.U.S. #1, X-O Manowar (vol. 2) #16	November 2014	978-1939346360
Valiant Entertainment
Quantum and Woody Vol. 1: The World's Worst Superhero Team	Quantum and Woody (vol. 2) #1–4	November 2013	978-1939346186
Quantum and Woody Vol. 2: In Security	Quantum and Woody (vol. 2) #5–8	March 2014	978-1939346230
Quantum and Woody Vol. 3: Crooked Pasts, Present Tense	Quantum and Woody (vol. 2) #9–12, Quantum and Woody: The Goat #0	September 2014	978-1939346391
Quantum and Woody Vol. 4: Quantum and Woody Must Die!	Quantum and Woody Must Die! #1–4, Valiant Sized Quantum and Woody #1	August 2015	978-1939346629
The Delinquents	The Delinquents #1–4	February 2015	978-1939346513
Quantum and Woody Deluxe Edition Book 1	Quantum and Woody (vol. 2) #1–12, Quantum and Woody: The Goat #0	January 2018	978-1939346681
Quantum and Woody Deluxe Edition Book 2	Quantum and Woody Must Die! #1–4, Valiant Sized Quantum and Woody #1, The Delinquents #1–4, Unity #25	June 2018	978-1682152676
Quantum and Woody! Vol. 1: Kiss Kiss, Klang Klang	Quantum and Woody (vol. 3) #1–5	July 2018	978-1682152690
Quantum and Woody! Vol. 2: Separation Anxiety	Quantum and Woody (vol. 3) #6–12	May 2019	978-1682152959
Quantum and Woody: Earth's Last Choice	Quantum and Woody (vol. 4) #1–4	November 2020	978-1682153628
