= Justice League Task Force (comics) =

American monthly comic book series

- Justice League Task Force #1 (June 1993), cover art by Sal Velluto.

Publication information
- Publisher: DC Comics
- Schedule: Monthly
- Format: Ongoing series
- Genre: Superhero
- Publication date: June 1993 – July 1996
- No. of issues: 37

Creative team
- Created by: David Michelinie; Sal Velluto
- Written by: various
- Artist: various

Justice League Task Force was an American monthly comic book series published by DC Comics from June 1993 to August 1996; it lasted 37 issues. At the time the Justice League was featured in three separate series: Justice League America, Justice League Europe (JLE) and Justice League Quarterly (JLQ). Justice League Task Force was a spinoff of Justice League Europe, a series which ran from April 1989 to May 1993. Like JLE, this team carried a United Nations charter which sanctioned their activities. The team was called to action by Hannibal Martin, a representative of the U.N. He asked that Martian Manhunter select a "strike team" of fellow Justice League members and to "lead them on a very special mission".

== Publication history ==
=== Creative teams ===
Because of the varied nature of the missions the Task Force would be employed on, and the versatility of the concept, various writers and artists were featured on this title. Up to issue #13 most writers wrote only up to three issues (even the series' creator David Michelinie only wrote the first three issues, although a misprint on the cover of issue #5 credited him with the story, but it was actually written by Denny O'Neil), which changed when Mark Waid came on board, who wrote Justice League Task Force for eight issues and changed the concept to what it would ultimately become. His last few issues were co-written with Christopher Priest, who came on at issue #18 and wrote the title up to its cancellation at issue #37.

Similar to the role of the writers, few pencillers stuck around for more than one or two issues, with exception being Sal Velluto, who, alongside Michelinie created the book, and pencilled 22 issues of the title. The only other regular artist was Ramon Bernado, who pencilled nine issues in total and pencilled the title's last few issues.

== Biography ==
=== Membership ===
Because the Justice League Task force had a variable line-up, there was no definite number of stable members, aside from the Martian Manhunter and Gypsy, who (with the exception of issue #9 in Gypsy's case) appeared in every issue of the run. Other members who made regular appearances include Triumph, Ray, L-Ron (in Despero's body), and Mystek.

==== Core members ====
- Martian Manhunter (leader)
- Gypsy
- L-Ron/Despero
- Mystek
- Ray (Ray Terrill)
- Triumph

==== Recruits ====
- Aquaman (Arthur Curry)
- Batman (Bruce Wayne)
- Black Canary (Dinah Laurel Lance)
- Bronze Tiger (Ben Turner)
- Damage (Grant Emerson)
- Dolphin
- Elongated Man (Ralph Dibny)
- Fire (Beatriz da Costa)
- Flash (Wally West)
- Geist
- Green Arrow (Oliver Queen)
- Joe Public
- Hourman (Rex Tyler)
- Lionheart
- Loose Cannon
- Maxima
- Metamorpho (Rex Mason)
- Nightwing (Dick Grayson)
- Tasmanian Devil
- Thunderbolt (Peter Cannon)
- Vixen
- Wonder Woman

== Fictional history ==
=== The beginning ===
The first mission of this new Justice League team concern a group of rebels, led by Rafael Sierra, who are planning to assassinate Sanobel President Enrique Ramos. They enlist the aid of Count Jeremy Glass, who produces a superlaser that "projects death from miles away", a device the rebels are reluctant to use. Nightwing is assigned by Hannibal Martin to stop Sierra on his own. Meanwhile, the Task Force engages the rebels. During an ensuing fight at the palace, Ramos hurries to shut down the superlaser and finds himself in Nightwing's sights, but, in a crisis of conscience, the superhero cannot pull the trigger. Ultimately, Ramos destroys the machine, but at the cost of his own life. As the story ends, Rafael Sierra becomes President, and Martin reveals that he selected Nightwing because he knew that the hero would never kill; he intended Nightwing to fail. Nightwing and Flash quit the team in anger.

Gypsy proceeds to go on a solo mission in issue #4, in which she and the Martian Manhunter (who follows Gypsy) defeat Sa'ar, the Ageless One. Afterward the team becomes involved with the KnightQuest, in which they aid Bruce Wayne in the search of Dr. Kinsolving and Jack Drake (father of Tim Drake, the third Robin. The team next encompasses a complete female membership (including a shapeshifted Martian Manhunter) in order to save the life of Henry R. Haggard, who carries with him a deadly virus, from a savage female tribe. Martian Manhunter is faced with more trouble when two New Blood heroes, Joe Public and Geist seek his mentorship, but by the end of the tale in issue #9, they revoke their membership in the League, confident that they're not cut out to be superheroes.

Next, the Aryan Brigade plans to release a virus that will kill any non-Aryan in Northern America. The League is capable of infiltrating the group, but are soon compromised when a Nation member recognizes Peter Cannon, Thunderbolt. The League eventually manages to escape with the help of Hourman (Rex Tyler) and stop the virus from being spread. After the mission, Hannibal Martin reveals the return of L-Ron, still inhabiting the body of old foe Despero, to warn the team of the coming threat of the Overmaster. Shortly afterward, the Justice League collectively faces the Overmaster, who kills the superheroine Ice in Justice League Task Force #14. During the assault on Overmaster's citadel, Gypsy is left behind in an Arctic wasteland as the main group forged forward, leading her to quit the team after the battle. The Task Force then become embroiled in the Zero Hour conflict, and Triumph, a hero retconned into having been a founding member of the original Justice League, appears and joins the team. After Zero Hour, the Martian Manhunter and L-Ron assemble a new group, making the Task Force a training ground for new heroes, and the team consists of themselves, Triumph, the Ray and a returned Gypsy.

=== A new team and purpose ===
The cover to Justice League Task Force #0 featuring the new team. Art by Sal Velluto/Jeff Albrecht.

The new team seemingly fits well together, but Gypsy has trouble reconciling with the fact that the Despero on the team is not the Despero that killed her parents. As they train together, they are called to aid Vandal Savage, whose supply of replacement body parts and organs has been stolen. They are able to uncover the perpetrator, but do not allow Vandal Savage to kill her, earning them his wrath as he destroys their headquarters. Gypsy's fears are later added to when she and the team face Baron Űman von Mauler, who believes Gypsy to be his long-dead wife Nakia. She narrowly defeats him, and proceeds to hitchhike her way through Romania, leaving behind her teammates. She eventually ends up at Bronze Tiger's place, where the Martian Manhunter asks her to rejoin the team.

During this run, Christopher Priest established a piece of the series' lexicon: the tuna sandwich. When debating Vandal Savage's intelligence, Triumph asserted that Vandal Savage was a super-genius, not a tuna sandwich. Throughout the series, "tuna sandwich" became a euphemism for someone of low intelligence. The biggest problem for J'onzz‘ leadership was Triumph. With the attitude that his exile had cheated him out of vast fame and fortune, he became disliked by his teammates and poisonous in the team-work department. J'onzz literally had to crack Triumph's spine in order to bring him in line---and later had no choice but to expel him. Triumph's fate was left hanging as he pondered whether or not to accept a deal from the Demon Neron to re-align his history.

== Writers ==
- David Michelinie #1-3
- Chuck Dixon #4
- Dennis O'Neil #5-6
- Peter David #7-8
- Jeph Loeb #9
- Michael Jan Friedman #10-12
- Mark Waid #0, 13-15, 17-20
- Christopher Priest #16, 21-37

== Collected editions ==
This series has been collected in the following volumes:

Title	Material collected	Publication date	ISBN
Justice League Task Force Vol. 1: Purification Plague	Justice League Task Force #1-12	March 27, 2018	978-1401277963
Wonder Woman & the Justice League America Vol. 2	Justice League Task Force #13-14, Plus Justice League America #86-91, Justice League International Vol. 2 #65-66	October 10, 2017	978-1401274009
