= Green Lantern (comic book) =

Comic book series featuring the DC Comics heroes of the same name

- Cover of Green Lantern #1 (fall 1941) by Howard Purcell

Publication information
- Publisher: DC Comics
- Schedule: List: (Vol. 1) Quarterly: #1–18 Bimonthly: #19–38 (Vol. 2) Bimonthly: #1–9; #82–96 Eight times a year: #10–81 Monthly: #97–224 (Vol. 3) Monthly: #1–181 (Vol. 4) Monthly: #1–67 (Vol. 5) Monthly: #1–52 (Green Lanterns) Twice Monthly: #1–57 (Hal Jordan and the Green Lantern Corps) Twice Monthly: #1–50 (Vol. 6) Monthly: #1–12 (Vol. 7) Monthly: #1–present
- Format: Ongoing series
- Genre: Superhero
- Publication date: List: (vol. 1) fall 1941 – May–June 1949 (vol. 2) July–August 1960 – April–May 1972 and August–September 1976 – May 1988 (vol. 3) June 1990 – November 2004 (vol. 4) July 2005 – January 2010 (vol. 5) September 2011 – May 2016 (Green Lanterns) July 2016 – August 2018 (Hal Jordan and the Green Lantern Corps) June 2016 – October 2018 (vol. 6) April 2021 – April 2022 (vol. 7) May 2023 – Present
- No. of issues: List: (vol. 1): 38 (vol. 2): 224 plus three Annuals and two Specials (vol. 3): 183 (#1–181 plus issues #0 and #1,000,000); nine Annuals and one Green Lantern Plus The Ray (vol. 4): 67 (vol. 5): 57 (#1–52 plus issues #0 and #23.1–23.4); a Green Lantern: Futures End one-shot and four Annuals (Green Lanterns): 58 plus a DC Rebirth one-shot and one Annual (Hal Jordan and the Green Lantern Corps): 51 plus a DC Rebirth one-shot (vol. 6): 12 and one Annual (vol. 7): 36 and three Specials
- Main character(s): Alan Scott; Hal Jordan; Guy Gardner; John Stewart; Kyle Rayner; Simon Baz; Jessica Cruz; Sojourner Mullein the Green Lantern Corps

Creative team
- Created by: Bill Finger; Martin Nodell
- Written by: List: (vol. 1) Bill Finger (1–5, 7), Joe Greene, Alfred Bester Henry Kuttner John Broome, Robert Kanigher (vol. 2) John Broome (1–16, 18–22, 24, 27, 29–31, 36, 39–40, 44–47, 49–56, 59, 66, 69–71, 75) Gardner Fox (16–17, 21–23, 25–29, 32–38, 41–44, 46, 48, 50, 57–58, 60, 62, 65, 67) Dennis O'Neil (63–64, 68, 72, 76–87, 89–100, 102–129) Marv Wolfman (133–153) Mike W. Barr (131, 154–165) Joey Cavalieri (166–169, 173, 182–183) Len Wein (128, 172–183, 185–186) Steve Englehart (188–200) Laurie S. Sutton (134–147) (vol. 3) Gerard Jones (1–47) Ron Marz (48–107, 109–114, 117–125, 176–181, #0, #1,000,000, Annual #4, 6) Judd Winick (129–156, 158–164) Ben Raab (165–175) (vol. 4) Geoff Johns (vol. 5) Geoff Johns (0–20) Robert Venditti (20–52, 23.1, Annual #2-4) (Green Lanterns) Sam Humphries (1–32) Tim Seeley (33–47) Aaron Gillespie (48–49) Dan Jurgens (50–57) (Hal Jordan and the Green Lantern Corps) Robert Venditti (vol. 6) Geoffrey Thorne (vol. 7) Jeremy Adams
- Penciller: List: (vol. 1) Martin Nodell Irwin Hasen Alex Toth (vol. 2) Gil Kane Neal Adams Mike Grell Alex Saviuk Joe Staton Dave Gibbons (vol. 3) Pat Broderick Joe Staton Mark Bright Darryl Banks Dale Eaglesham (vol. 4) Carlos Pacheco Ethan Van Sciver Ivan Reis Doug Mahnke (vol. 5) Doug Mahnke Billy Tan (Green Lanterns) Robson Rocha (Hal Jordan and the Green Lantern Corps) Rafa Sandoval (vol. 6) Dexter Soy (vol. 7) Xermánico
- Inker: List: (vol. 1) Bob Oksner (vol. 2) Joe Giella Sid Greene Dick Giordano Bob Wiacek (vol. 3) Romeo Tanghal Rodney Ramos (vol. 4) Jesus Merino Christian Alamy Rob Hunter

Collected editions
- Golden Age Green Lantern Archives Volume 1: ISBN 1-56389-507-2
- Green Lantern Archive Volume 1: ISBN 1401202306
- The Road Back: ISBN 1-56389-045-3
- No Fear: ISBN 1-4012-0466-X

Green Lantern is an ongoing American comic-book series featuring the DC Comics heroes of the same name. The character's first incarnation, Alan Scott, appeared in All-American Comics #16 (July 1940), and was later spun off into the first volume of Green Lantern in 1941. After 38 issues, that series was cancelled in 1949. When the Silver Age Green Lantern, Hal Jordan, was introduced, the character starred in a new volume of Green Lantern starting in 1960.

Although Green Lantern is considered a mainstay in the DC Comics stable, the series has been cancelled and rebooted several times. When sales began slipping in the early 1990s, DC Comics instituted a controversial editorial mandate that turned Jordan into the supervillain Parallax and created a new protagonist named Kyle Rayner. This third volume ended publication in 2004, when the miniseries Green Lantern: Rebirth brought Hal Jordan back as a heroic character and made him the protagonist once again. After Rebirth's conclusion, writer Geoff Johns began a fourth volume of Green Lantern from 2005 to 2011, and a fifth volume which started immediately after, this time initially showcasing both Hal Jordan and Sinestro as Green Lantern.

== Publication history ==
=== Volume 1 (1941–1949) ===
Volume 1 was published from 1941 until 1949, spanning a total of 38 issues. The series featured Alan Scott, the first Green Lantern character, created by writer/artist Martin Nodell and writer Bill Finger. Alan's first appearance was in the anthology series, All-American Comics #16 (July 1940). The Green Lantern character received his own self-titled series in fall 1941. The first use of the Green Lantern oath was in issue #9 (late fall 1943). Artist Alex Toth did some of his earliest comics work on the title beginning with issue #28 (October–November 1947). A canine sidekick named Streak was introduced in #30 (February–March 1948) and the dog proved so popular that he became the featured character on several covers of the series starting with #34. The series was cancelled with #38 (May–June 1949). Although several subsequent Green Lantern revival projects have started over the years, this remains the only ongoing series to date to spotlight the Alan Scott character.

=== Volume 2 (1960–1972 and 1976–1988) ===
The Silver Age Green Lantern was created by John Broome and Gil Kane in Showcase #22 (October 1959) at the behest of editor Julius Schwartz. Volume 2 of Green Lantern began publication in August 1960. The series spotlighted the Silver Age Green Lantern, Hal Jordan and introduced the expansive mythology surrounding Hal's forebears in the Green Lantern Corps. The supervillain Sinestro was introduced in #7 (July–August 1961). In 2009, Sinestro was ranked IGN's 15th Greatest Comic Book Villain of All Time. Hal Jordan's love interest, Carol Ferris, became the Star Sapphire in issue #16. Black Hand, a character featured prominently in the "Blackest Night" storyline in 2009–2010, debuted in issue #29 (June 1964). A substitute Green Lantern, Guy Gardner first appeared in the story "Earth's Other Green Lantern!" in issue #59 (March 1968).

Cover for Green Lantern (vol. 2) #86 (October 1971), art by Neal Adams

Green Arrow joined Hal Jordan in the main feature of the title in an acclaimed series of stories by writer Dennis O'Neil and artist Neal Adams beginning with issue #76 (April 1970) and ending with issue #89 (April–May 1972) that dealt with various social and political issues in which Green Arrow spoke for radical change while Green Lantern was an establishment liberal figure, wanting to work within existing institutions of government and law. Where Oliver Queen advocated direct action, Hal Jordan wanted to work within the system; where Oliver advocated social change, Jordan was more concerned about dealing with criminals. Each would find their beliefs challenged by the other. Oliver convinced Jordan to see beyond his strict obedience to the Green Lantern Corps, to help those who were neglected or discriminated against. As O'Neil explained: "He would be a hot-tempered anarchist to contrast with the cerebral, sedate model citizen who was the Green Lantern." The duo embarked on a quest to find America, witnessing the problems of corruption, racism, pollution, and overpopulation confronting the nation. O'Neil took on then-current events, such as the Manson Family cult murders, in issue #78 where Black Canary falls briefly under the spell of a false prophet who advocates violence.

During this period, the most famous Green Arrow story appeared, in Green Lantern vol. 2, #85–86, when Green Arrow's ward Speedy was revealed to be addicted to heroin. In his zeal to save America, Oliver Queen had failed in his personal responsibility to Speedy — who would overcome his addiction with the help of Black Canary, Green Arrow's then-love interest. This story prompted a congratulatory letter from the mayor of New York City, John Lindsay. Another backup Green Lantern, John Stewart, was introduced in #87. The series did not match commercial expectations and Neal Adams had trouble with deadlines, causing issue #88 to be an unscheduled reprint issue; the series was cancelled with issue #89 (April–May 1972). Four months later, Green Lantern began a backup feature in The Flash #217 (Aug.–Sept. 1972) and appeared in most issues through The Flash #246 (Jan. 1977) until his own solo series was revived.

The Green Lantern title returned with issue #90 (Aug.–Sept. 1976) and continued the Green Lantern/Green Arrow team format. O'Neil continued to write the stories, which were drawn by artists such as Mike Grell and Alex Saviuk, while muting the social and political themes that had characterized the stories that had been drawn by Neal Adams. Julius Schwartz, who had edited the title for most of its run since 1960, left the series as of issue #103 (April 1978). In issue #123 (December 1979), Hal Jordan resumed the title spotlight and Green Arrow left the series. On the advice of artist Joe Staton, editor Jack C. Harris gave British artist Brian Bolland his first assignment for a U.S. comics publisher, the cover for Green Lantern #127 (April 1980). Writer Marv Wolfman and Staton created the Omega Men in Green Lantern #141 (June 1981).

In issue #182, writer Len Wein and artist Dave Gibbons made architect John Stewart, who had been introduced previously in issue #87, the title's primary character. Following the double-sized 200th issue by writer Steve Englehart and Joe Staton, the format changed again, this time altering the title's name to Green Lantern Corps and focusing upon the seven members of an Earth-based contingent of the corps (including Jordan and Stewart). The series remained as such until its cancellation in 1988 with issue #224. Between volumes 2 and 3, Green Lantern stories, mostly featuring Hal Jordan, appeared in Action Comics Weekly.

=== Volume 3 (1990–2004) ===
Volume 3 began in 1990 and featured Hal Jordan and the Green Lantern Corps in stories by Gerard Jones and Pat Broderick. By the mid-1990s, sales on the book began to fall and an editorial mandate was handed down by DC Comics to drastically change the status quo to revitalize the title and characters. This was given in the form of the controversial storyline "Emerald Twilight".

"Emerald Twilight" detailed that in the aftermath of the destruction of Hal Jordan's hometown Coast City (which occurred as part of "The Death of Superman" storyline), Jordan was shown going mad with grief by trying to use his power to resurrect the city and its inhabitants. The Guardians of the Universe found fault with Jordan and stated their intent to strip him of his ring. Jordan responded angrily, and sought not only the destruction of the Guardians, but also the Green Lantern Corps itself. He killed countless Green Lanterns in his rampage through the universe to Oa, seemingly killed his arch enemy Sinestro, killed the Guardians and took the power of Oa's Central Power Battery for himself. Gaining unimaginable power over space and time, Jordan became the supervillain Parallax and, with that, became the leading antagonist going into DC's 1994 event Zero Hour: Crisis in Time.

Cover for Green Lantern (vol. 3) #51 (May 1994), Kyle Rayner's first issue as the main character, art by Darryl Banks and Romeo Tanghal

After this, Kyle Rayner, a young art student, was introduced as the new protagonist and the "last" Green Lantern, since the Corps no longer existed. Writers Ron Marz and Judd Winick both had long runs with the character, building Kyle's popularity so much that he was included in the lineup of Grant Morrison's Justice League relaunch JLA, and slowly reintroduced more familiar Green Lantern aspects over the 10 years Rayner had in the title. Volume 3 culminated in a revival of the Guardians of the Universe, the introduction of Ion, and Kyle taking a journey into space that led directly into the miniseries Green Lantern: Rebirth.

=== Volume 4 (2005–2011) ===
Cover to Green Lantern (vol. 4) #1 (July 2005), art by Carlos Pacheco

After the events of Rebirth, in which writer Geoff Johns revealed Parallax to be a parasitic embodiment of fear rather than as an identity of Hal Jordan, a fourth volume of Green Lantern began publication returning Hal Jordan to the prominent Green Lantern in the DC Universe. Johns and artist Carlos Pacheco launched the new series in July 2005. Trying to rebuild his life, Hal Jordan has moved to the nearly deserted Coast City, which is slowly being reconstructed. He has been reinstated as a captain in the United States Air Force, and works in the Test Pilot Program at Edwards Air Force Base. The series introduces new supporting characters for Hal, most notably a man from Hal's past, Air Force's General Jonathan "Herc" Stone, who learned Hal's secret as Green Lantern during a battle with the Manhunters and acts as his ally. He also begins to develop a romantic attraction with his fellow pilot, the beautiful Captain Jillian "Cowgirl" Pearlman. The returning characters also include Carol Ferris, Tom Kalmaku, and Hal's younger brother James Jordan with his sister-in-law Susan and their children, Howard and Jane.

In his new title, he faces revamped versions of his Silver Age foes such as Hector Hammond, the Shark, and Black Hand. As part of DC's revision of the entire universe, as of Green Lantern vol. 4, #10, the series has skipped ahead one year, bringing drastic changes to Hal Jordan's life, as with every other hero in the DC Universe. It is revealed that Jordan spent time as a prisoner of war in an unnamed conflict and has feelings of guilt from his inability to free himself and his fellow captives.

A new account of Green Lantern's origins was released in the 2008 Green Lantern series "Secret Origin". In this new origin, Hal Jordan, is working as an assistant mechanic under Tom Kalmaku himself, barred from flying due to his insubordination while in the United States Air Force and his employers lingering guilt about his father's death in the line of duty, when Abin Sur, fighting Atrocitus of the Five Inversion, crashes near Coast City. Hal and the rest of the Green Lantern Corps find themselves at war with Sinestro and his army, the Sinestro Corps during the events of the Sinestro Corps War.

Leading into the "Blackest Night" storyline, the "Rage of the Red Lanterns" arc features Jordan making use of both Red and Blue power rings. In the Agent Orange story arc, Hal Jordan is briefly in command of Larfleeze's power battery after he steals it from him in a battle. The orange light of avarice converses with Jordan, his costume changes, and he becomes an Orange Lantern. Larfleeze quickly takes his power battery back from Jordan. The Green Lantern mythology is center stage with the DC crossover event Blackest Night, which sees dead heroes and villains across the DC Universe becoming active as members of the Black Lantern Corps. Combating Black Lanterns with fellow DC characters the Flash, the Atom, and Mera, Jordan fights alongside the high-profile members of every corps in the emotional spectrum, and oversees new DC characters inductions into all the other corps. Jordan and his "New Guardians" move with the other new corps members to combat the Black Lantern Corps and its leader Nekron directly.

After the conclusion to Blackest Night, the Green Lantern title tied into the aftermath event Brightest Day, with several members of Corps from across the emotional spectrum seeking to gain control of the White Entity that settled on Earth in the final issue of Blackest Night. After the conclusion of Brightest Day, the mad ex-Guardian of the Universe Krona returns, taking control of the Green Lantern Corps and causing Hal, John Stewart, Guy Gardner, and Kyle Rayner to fight their brothers-in-arms across the War of the Green Lanterns event. The War story ends with Hal Jordan killing Krona, an act which alarms the Guardians enough that they strip Hal of his ring and return him to Earth, no longer serving as Green Lantern of Sector 2814. In his place, inexplicably, is Sinestro, former renegade and enemy of the Corps, serving in Hal's place to the shock and chagrin of everyone involved.

After a new continuity was created in the wake of the Flashpoint limited series, the first issue of the new volume of Green Lantern was released on September 14, 2011.

=== Volume 5 (2011–2016) ===
Sinestro on the cover of Green Lantern (vol. 5) #1, art by Ivan Reis

As part of The New 52 initiative, which rebooted DC's continuity, DC Comics relaunched Green Lantern with a new issue #1, written again by Geoff Johns and penciled by Doug Mahnke. As with all of the books associated with the DC relaunch, Hal Jordan appears to be about five years younger than the previous incarnation of the character. Superheroes at large have appeared only in the past five years, and are viewed with at best, suspicion, and at worst, outright hostility.

The entire history of Johns' previous run on the Green Lantern title is still a part of the continuity of The New 52, with major storylines "Rebirth", "Sinestro Corps War", "Blackest Night", and "Brightest Day" all still forming the backbone of the recent history of the characters. As a result, the new volume of Green Lantern continues directly from the events of War of the Green Lanterns, with Sinestro serving as a Green Lantern and Hal Jordan beginning the series powerless on Earth.

The title's first story arc, simply titled "Sinestro", deals with the former renegade's return to the Green Lantern Corps and Hal Jordan's mundane earthbound life. While on patrol, Sinestro visits his home planet of Korugar, and to his horror discovers that the remaining members of the Sinestro Corps have enslaved the planet's populace. In order to assist him in retaking the planet, Sinestro travels to Earth and creates a ring for Hal Jordan, his greatest enemy.

Following Hal Jordan and Sinestro's apparent deaths at the hands of the Guardians of the Universe while facing Black Hand, Simon Baz, an Arab-Muslim, becomes the newest Green Lantern from Earth in Green Lantern #0. Later following Jordan's revival in #20, the series shifted to focusing on him exclusively once again where he is now the leader of the Green Lantern Corps. The series later shifted where following the major incidents over the next few story arcs, Hal Jordan voluntarily became a scapegoat to preserve the Green Lanterns' reputation and officially became a renegade starting from the series 40th issue, using the same gauntlet Krona once had in place of a Power Ring which lasted until the series' conclusion.

=== Green Lanterns and Hal Jordan and the Green Lantern Corps (2016–2018) ===
As part of the DC Rebirth relaunch of DC's titles in 2016, Green Lantern was cancelled and replaced with two new series: Green Lanterns starring Simon Baz and Jessica Cruz and Hal Jordan and the Green Lantern Corps starring Hal Jordan. Hal Jordan and the Green Lantern Corps had a 50 issue run, ending on August 8, 2018. Green Lanterns ran for 57 issues before ending on October 17, 2018.

=== The Green Lantern and Blackstars (2019–2020) ===
Grant Morrison took over writing the series with the Hal Jordan-centred The Green Lantern: Season One, illustrated by Liam Sharp. Together with an Annual, the 12-issue series brought Jordan back to the concept of a space cop, investigating an intergalactic mystery. Morrison intended the series to be similar to his Batman and Superman runs, where all of Jordan's continuity would be on the table. Season Two of the series was announced partway through the run.

The Green Lantern: Blackstars is a 3-issue series taking place between Season One and Season Two of the main series, written by Morrison and drawn by Xermanico. The series follows Hal Jordan, a Green Lantern who has been exiled from Earth for his crimes, now a member of the Blackstars, a group of exiled superheroes who have been forced to work for the Sinestro Corps.

The Green Lantern: Season Two is another 12-issue run by Morrison and Sharp, which concluded the story they wanted to tell.

=== Volume 6 (2021–2022) ===
Green Lantern volume 6 was part of the Infinite Frontier relaunch with the original creative team being Geoffrey Thorne with art by Dexter Soy. This volume follows John Stewart as the titular character, with Jo Mullein and Keli Quintela (Teen Lantern) acting as supporting characters.

=== Volume 7 (2023–present) ===
A new Green Lantern ongoing series starring Hal Jordan began publication in May 2023. The series is written by Jeremy Adams and feature art by Xermánico. The series also set up a John Stewart series, with both being written by Phillip Kennedy Johnson and drawn by Osvaldo Montos. Set after the events of Dark Crisis on Infinite Earths, the Guardians of Oa have quarantined Sector 2814, home of Earth, much to Hal's dismay. The series also introduces Razer and Aya, who were originally created for Green Lantern: The Animated Series, into the mainline continuity.

== Collected editions ==
Several of the comic books have been collected into individual volumes:

=== Green Lantern vol. 1 (1941–1949) ===
Title	Vol.	Release date	ISBN	Contents
Golden Age Green Lantern Archives	01	May 1999	1-56389-507-2	Green Lantern #1 and All-American Comics #16–30; 224 pages
Golden Age Green Lantern Archives	02	February 2002	1-56389-794-6	Green Lantern #2–3 and All-American Comics #31–38; 232 pages

=== Green Lantern vol. 2 (1959–1988) ===
Title	Vol.	Release date	ISBN	Contents
The Green Lantern Omnibus	01	November 24, 2010	1-4012-3056-3	Showcase #22–24 and Green Lantern vol. 2 #1–21; 640 pages
The Green Lantern Omnibus	02	November 23, 2011	1-4012-3295-7	Green Lantern vol. 2 #22–45; 624 pages
Green Lantern Archives	01	June 3, 2004	1-56389-087-9	Showcase #22–24 and Green Lantern vol. 2 #1–5; 201 pages
Green Lantern Archives	02	June 3, 2004	1-56389-566-8	Green Lantern vol. 2 #6–13; 210 pages
Green Lantern Archives	03	June 3, 2004	1-56389-713-X	Green Lantern vol. 2 #14–21; 208 pages
Green Lantern Archives	04	June 3, 2004	1-56389-811-X	Green Lantern vol. 2 #22–29; 209 pages
Green Lantern Archives	05	January 19, 2005	1-4012-0404-X	Green Lantern vol. 2 #30–38; 240 pages
Green Lantern Archives	06	January 3, 2007	1-4012-1189-5	Green Lantern vol. 2 #39–47; 240 pages
Green Lantern Archives	07	August 2, 2012	1-4012-3513-1	Green Lantern vol. 2 #48–57; 256 pages
The Green Lantern Chronicles	01	April 29, 2009	1-4012-2163-7	Showcase #22–24 and Green Lantern vol. 2 #1–3
The Green Lantern Chronicles	02	December 23, 2009	1-4012-2499-7	Green Lantern vol. 2 #4–9
The Green Lantern Chronicles	03	October 27, 2010	1-4012-2915-8	Green Lantern vol. 2 #10–14, The Flash #131
The Green Lantern Chronicles	04	March 21, 2012	1-4012-3396-1	Green Lantern vol. 2 #15–20
Showcase Presents: Green Lantern	01	November 17, 2010	1-4012-0759-6	Showcase #22–24 and Green Lantern vol. 2 #1–17; 528 pages
Showcase Presents: Green Lantern	02	February 28, 2007	1-4012-1264-6	Green Lantern vol. 2 #18–37 and The Flash #143; 528 pages
Showcase Presents: Green Lantern	03	May 21, 2008	1-4012-1792-3	Green Lantern vol. 2 #39–59; 528 pages
Showcase Presents: Green Lantern	04	June 10, 2009	1-4012-2278-1	Green Lantern vol. 2 #60–75; 392 pages
Showcase Presents: Green Lantern	05	April 27, 2011	1-4012-3023-7	Green Lantern vol. 2 #76–87, 89; and The Flash #217–221, 223, 224, 226–228, 230, 231, 233, 234, 237, 238, 240–243, 245, 246; 496 pages
Green Lantern/Green Arrow	01	January 1, 2004	1-4012-0224-1	Green Lantern vol. 2 #76–82
Green Lantern/Green Arrow	02	July 14, 2004	1-4012-0230-6	Green Lantern vol. 2 #83–87, 89; and The Flash #217–219, 226
Green Lantern/Green Arrow		August 15, 2012	978-1401235178	Green Lantern vol. 2 #76–87, 89; and The Flash #217–219, 226; 368 pages
Green Lantern/Green Arrow by Denny O' Neil & Mike Grell	01	July 21, 2020	978-1401295530	Green Lantern vol. 2 #90-106; 334
Tales of the Green Lantern Corps	01	February 25, 2009	978-1401221553	Tales of the Green Lantern Corps #1–3; and backup stories from Green Lantern vol. 2 #148, 151–154, 161, 162 and 164–167; 160 pages
Tales of the Green Lantern Corps	02	January 27, 2010	978-1401227029	backup stories from Green Lantern vol. 2 #168, 169, 171–173, 177, 179–183, 185, 187–190 and Tales of the Green Lantern Corps Annual #1; 144 pages
Tales of the Green Lantern Corps	03	December 15, 2010	978-1401229344	Green Lantern vol. 2 #201–206; 144 pages
Green Lantern: Sector 2814	01	November 14, 2012	978-1401236892	Green Lantern vol. 2 #172–176 & 178–181; 192 pages
Green Lantern: Sector 2814	02	August 21, 2013	978-1401240783	Green Lantern vol. 2 #182–183 & 185–189; 232 pages
Green Lantern: Sector 2814	03	January 8, 2014	978-1401243272	Green Lantern vol. 2 #194–200; 200 pages
Green Lantern: The Silver Age	01	October 5, 2016	978-1401263485	Showcase #22–24 and Green Lantern vol. 2 #1–9; 356 pages
Green Lantern: The Silver Age	02	July 11, 2017	978-1401271077	Green Lantern vol. 2 #10–22; 320 pages
Green Lantern: The Silver Age	03	April 24, 2018	978-1401278472	Green Lantern vol. 2 #23-35; 344 pages
Green Lantern: The Silver Age	04	October 1, 2019	978-1401294359	Green Lantern vol. 2 #36–48; 336 pages
Green Lantern: The Silver Age Omnibus	01	February 22, 2017	978-1401268572	Showcase #22–24 and Green Lantern vol. 2 #1–35; 1000 pages
Green Lantern: The Silver Age Omnibus	02	March 28, 2018	978-1401278021	Green Lantern vol. 2 #36–75; 1000 pages
Green Lantern/Green Arrow: Hard Travelin' Heroes Omnibus		May 21, 2024	978-1779525734	Green Lantern (vol. 2) #76–87, 89–123; World's Finest Comics #201; Material from Brave and the Bold #100, DC Special-Series #1, DC Super-Stars #17, The Flash (vol. 1) #218-224, 226-228, 230-231, 233-234, 237-238, 240-246, Green Lantern 80th Anniversary 100-Page Super Spectacular #1, World's Finest Comics #210, 255

=== Green Lantern vol. 3 (1990–2004) ===
Title	Release date	ISBN	Contents
Green Lantern: Hal Jordan Volume One	January 18, 2017	978-1401265755	Green Lantern: Emerald Dawn #1–6 & Green Lantern: Emerald Dawn II #1–6; 304 pages
The Road Back	January 1, 2004	1563890453	Green Lantern vol. 3 #1–8; 192 pages
Green Lantern: Kyle Rayner Vol. 1	October 17, 2017	978-1401276874	Green Lantern vol. 3 #0, 48–57, R.E.B.E.L.S. '94 #1, New Titans #116–117; 368 pages
Green Lantern: Kyle Rayner Vol. 2	May 2, 2018	978-1401278502	Green Lantern vol. 3 #58–65, New Titans #124–125, Darkstars #34, Guy Gardner: Warrior #27–28, Damage #16; 360 pages
Green Lantern: Kyle Rayner Vol. 3	January 9, 2019	978-1401285715	Green Lantern Vol. 3 #66–75 and Annual #4; 296 Pages
Emerald Twilight	March 1994	978-1563891649	Green Lantern vol. 3 #48–50
Emerald Twilight/New Dawn	September 4, 2003	1-56389-999-X	Green Lantern vol. 3 #48–55; 192 pages
New Dawn	February 1997	978-1563892226	Green Lantern vol. 3 #51–55; 128 pages
Baptism of Fire	March 10, 1999	978-1563895241	Green Lantern vol. 3 #59, 66–67, 70–75; 208 pages
Emerald Allies	March 1, 2000	1-56389-603-6	Green Lantern vol. 3 #76–77, 92 and Green Arrow vol. 2 #104, 110–111, 125–126; 208 pages
Emerald Knights	November 1, 1998	1-56389-475-0	Green Lantern vol. 3 #99–106 and Green Arrow vol. 2 #136; 208 pages
New Journey, Old Path	August 1, 2001	1-56389-729-6	Green Lantern vol. 3 #129–136; 192 pages
Circle of Fire	February 9, 2021	978-1779509055	Green Lantern vol. 3 #129–136, Green Lantern: Circle of Fire #1-2, Green Lantern/Atom #1, Green Lantern/Power Girl #1, Green Lantern/Adam Strange #1, Green Lantern/Firestorm #1, Green Lantern/Green Lantern #1; 416 pages
The Power of Ion	March 1, 2003	1-56389-972-8	Green Lantern vol. 3 #142–150; 226 pages
Brother's Keeper	July 1, 2003	1-4012-0078-8	Green Lantern vol. 3 #151–155 and Green Lantern Secret Files #3; 128 pages
Passing The Torch	September 1, 2004	1401202373	Green Lantern vol. 3 #156, 158–161 and Green Lantern Secret Files #2; 128 pages

- Superman: The Return of Superman includes Green Lantern vol. 3 #46, 480 pages, December 1993, 1-56389-149-2

=== Green Lantern vol. 4 (2005–2011) ===
Title	Release date	ISBN	Contents	Pages
Rebirth	Hardcover: October 10, 2005; Softcover: March 28, 2007	Hardcover: 1-4012-0710-3; Softcover: 1-4012-0465-1	Green Lantern: Rebirth #1–6, story from Green Lantern Secret Files and Origins 2005 #1	176 pages
Absolute Green Lantern Rebirth	Oversized Hardcover: April 21, 2010	1-4012-2574-8	Green Lantern: Rebirth #1–6, Green Lantern Secret Files and Origins 2005 #1 and Green Lantern vol. 4 #1	224 pages
No Fear	Hardcover: April 19, 2006; Softcover: May 14, 2009	Hardcover: 1-4012-0466-X; Softcover: 1-4012-1058-9	Green Lantern vol. 4 #1–6 and Green Lantern Secret Files and Origins #1	176 pages
Revenge of the Green Lanterns	Hardcover: November 29, 2006; Softcover: October 1, 2008	Hardcover: 1-4012-1167-4, Softcover: 1-4012-0960-2)	Green Lantern vol. 4 #7–13	176 pages
Wanted: Hal Jordan	Hardcover: August 1, 2007; Softcover: January 7, 2009	Hardcover: 1-4012-1339-1, Softcover: 1-4012-1590-4	Green Lantern vol. 4 #14–20	160 pages
The Sinestro Corps War: Volume 1	Hardcover: February 20, 2008; Softcover: April 29, 2009	Hardcover: 1-4012-1650-1, Softcover: 1-4012-1870-9	Green Lantern vol. 4 #21–23, Green Lantern Corps vol. 2 #14–15 and Green Lantern: Sinestro Corps Special #1	176 pages
The Sinestro Corps War: Volume 2	Hardcover: June 18, 2008; Softcover: June 17, 2009	Hardcover: 1-4012-1800-8, Softcover: 1-4012-2036-3	Green Lantern vol. 4 #24–25 and Green Lantern Corps vol. 2 #16–19,	192 pages
The Sinestro Corps War	September 14, 2011	Softcover: 978-1401233013	Green Lantern vol. 4 #21-25, Green Lantern Corps #14-19, and Green Lantern: Sinestro Corps Special #1	336 pages
Absolute Green Lantern: Sinestro Corps War	September 26, 2012	Oversized Hardcover: 978-1401237356	Green Lantern vol. 4 #21-25, Green Lantern Corps #14-19, and Green Lantern: Sinestro Corps Special #1	368 pages
Tales of the Sinestro Corps	Hardcover: June 25, 2008; Softcover: June 24, 2009	Hardcover: 1-4012-1801-6; Softcover: 1-4012-2326-5	Tales of the Sinestro Corps: Parallax #1, Tales of the Sinestro Corps: Cyborg-Superman #1, Tales of the Sinestro Corps: Superman-Prime #1, Tales of the Sinestro Corps: Ion #1, Green Lantern/Sinestro Corps Secret Files #1, and stories from Green Lantern: Sinestro Corps Special #1 and Green Lantern vol. 4 #18–20	200 pages
Secret Origin	Hardcover: December 10, 2008; Softcover: February 3, 2010	Hardcover: 1-4012-1990-X, Softcover: 1-4012-2017-7	Green Lantern vol. 4 #29–35	176 pages
Rage of the Red Lanterns	Hardcover: July 1, 2009; Softcover: July 21, 2010	Hardcover: 1-4012-2301-X, Softcover: 1-4012-2302-8	Green Lantern vol. 4 #26–28, 36–38 and Final Crisis: Rage of the Red Lanterns	176 pages
Agent Orange	Hardcover: November 11, 2009; Softcover: November 3, 2010	Hardcover: 1-4012-2421-0; Softcover: 1-4012-2420-2	Green Lantern vol. 4 #39–42	128 pages
Blackest Night: Green Lantern	Hardcover: July 8, 2010; Softcover: July 13, 2011	Hardcover: 1-4012-2786-4; Softcover: 978-1401229528	Green Lantern vol. 4 #43–52	272 pages
Green Lantern: Brightest Day	Hardcover: June 15, 2011; Softcover: May 16, 2012	Hardcover: 1-4012-3181-0; Softcover: 1-4012-3141-1	Green Lantern vol. 4 #53–62	256 pages
War of the Green Lanterns	Hardcover: November 16, 2011; Softcover: September 5, 2012	Hardcover: 1-4012-3234-5; Softcover: 1-4012-3452-6	Green Lantern vol. 4 #63–67, Green Lantern Corps vol. 2 #58–60, and Green Lantern: Emerald Warriors #8–10,	272 pages
War of the Green Lanterns: Aftermath	Hardcover: January 18, 2012; Softcover: January 9, 2013	Hardcover: 1-4012-3343-0; Softcover: 1-4012-3538-7	Green Lantern Corps vol. 2 #61–63, Green Lantern: Emerald Warriors #11–13, and War of the Green Lantern: Aftermath #1–2	208 pages
Green Lantern by Geoff Johns Book One	March 25, 2019		Green Lantern: Rebirth #1-6, Green Lantern #1-3, Green Lantern Corps: Recharge #1-5 and Green Lantern Secret Files 2005 #1	375 pages
Green Lantern by Geoff Johns Book Two	September 24, 2019		Green Lantern #4-20	370 pages
Green Lantern by Geoff Johns Book Three	April 14, 2020		Green Lantern #18-25, Green Lantern Corps #14-18, Green Lantern Sinestro Corps Special #1, Tales of the Sinestro Corps: Superman Prime #1 and Green Lantern/Sinestro Corps: Secret Files #1	398 pages
Green Lantern by Geoff Johns Book Four	December 29, 2020		Green Lantern #26-38 and Final Crisis: Rage of the Red Lanterns #1	328 pages
Green Lantern by Geoff Johns Omnibus Vol. 1	January 28, 2015	Hardcover: 978-1401251345	Green Lantern: Rebirth #1-6, Green Lantern vol. 4 #1-25, Green Lantern Corps:Recharge #1-5, Green Lantern Corps vol. 2 #14-18, Green Lantern Secret Files and Origins 2005 #1, Green Lantern Sinestro Corps Special #1, Tales of the Sinestro Corps:Superman Prime #1, and Green Lantern/Sinestro Corps:Secret Files #1	1232 pages
Green Lantern by Geoff Johns Omnibus Vol. 2	July 29, 2015	Hardcover: 978-1401255268	Green Lantern vol. 4 #26-52, Blackest Night #0-8, DC Universe #0, Final Crisis Rage of the Red Lanterns #1, Untold Tales of Blackest Night #1 and Blackest Night:Tales of the Corps #1-3	1040 pages
Green Lantern by Geoff Johns Omnibus Vol. 3	April 13, 2016	Hardcover: 978-1401258207	Green Lantern vol. 4 #53-67, Green Lantern: Larfleeze Christmas Special #1, Green Lantern vol. 5 #1-20, Green Lantern Annual #1, Green Lantern Corps vol. 2 #58-60, and Green Lantern: Emerald Warriors #8-10	1104 pages

=== Green Lantern vol. 5 (2011–2016) ===
Vol.	Title	Release date	ISBN	Contents
01	Sinestro	May 2012 (hardcover); January 8, 2013 (paperback)	1-4012-3454-2	Green Lantern vol. 5 #1–6; 160 pages
02	Revenge of the Black Hand	January 2013 (hardcover); October 22, 2013 (paperback)	1-4012-3766-5	Green Lantern vol. 5 #7–12, Green Lantern Annual #1; 192 pages
03	The End	October 22, 2013 (hardcover); April 29, 2014 (paperback)	1-4012-4408-4	Green Lantern vol. 5 #13–20, #0; 224 pages
04	Dark Days	April 29, 2014 (hardcover); November 4, 2014 (paperback)	978-1-4012-4744-7	Green Lantern vol. 5 #21–26, #23.1: Relic, Green Lantern Annual #2; 200 pages
05	Test of Wills	October 29, 2014 (hardcover); May 19, 2015 (paperback)	1-4012-5089-0	collects Green Lantern vol. 5 #27–34, Green Lantern Corps #31–33; 256 pages
06	The Life Equation	May 19, 2015 (hardcover); April 26, 2016 (paperback)	1-4012-5476-4	Green Lantern vol. 5 #35–40, Green Lantern Annual #3; 184 pages
07	Renegade	April 26, 2016 (hardcover); October 4, 2016 (paperback)	1-4012-6522-7	Green Lantern vol. 5 41–46, Green Lantern Annual #4, DC Sneak Peek: Green Lantern 1; 168 pages
08	Reflections	October 4, 2016 (hardcover)	1-4012-6523-5	Green Lantern vol. 5 47–52; 200 pages
Rise of the Third Army		September 10, 2013 (hardcover); March 25, 2014 (paperback)	1-4012-4499-8	Green Lantern Annual vol. 5 #1, Green Lantern vol. 5 #13–16, Green Lantern Corps vol. 3 #13–16, Green Lantern: New Guardians #13–16, Red Lantern #13–16, Green Lantern Corps Annual vol. 3 #1; 416 pages
Wrath of the First Lantern		February 25, 2014 (hardcover); August 19, 2014 (paperback)	1-4012-4409-2	Green Lantern vol. 5 #17–20, Green Lantern Corps vol. 3 #17–20, Green Lantern: New Guardians #17–20, Red Lantern #17–20; 416 pages
Lights Out		June 24, 2014 (hardcover); December 30, 2014 (paperback)	1-4012-4816-0	Green Lantern vol. 5 #24, Green Lantern Corps #24, Green Lantern: New Guardians #23–24, Red Lanterns #24, Green Lantern Annual #2, Green Lantern #23.1: Relic; 192 pages
Green Lantern/New Gods: Godhead		September 9, 2015 (hardcover); May 25, 2016 (paperback)	1-4012-5847-6	Green Lantern/New Gods: Godhead #1, Green Lantern #35–37, Green Lantern Corps #35–37, Green Lantern New Guardians #35–37, Red Lanterns #35–37, Sinestro #6–8 and Green Lantern Annual #3; 424 pages

=== Hal Jordan and the Green Lantern Corps (2016–2018) ===
Vol.	Title	Release date	ISBN	Contents
01	Sinestro's Law	February, 2017	978-1401268008	Hal Jordan and the Green Lantern Corps: Rebirth #1; Hal Jordan and the Green Lantern Corps #1–7
02	Bottled Light	June, 2017	978-1401269135	Hal Jordan and the Green Lantern Corps #8–13
03	Quest for the Blue Lanterns	August, 2017	978-1401271640	Hal Jordan and the Green Lantern Corps #14–21
04	Fracture	January, 2018	978-1401283728	Hal Jordan and the Green Lantern Corps #22–29
05	Twilight of the Guardians	June, 2018	978-1401280376	Hal Jordan and the Green Lantern Corps #30-31, 33–36
06	Zod's Will	September, 2018	978-1401284442	Hal Jordan and the Green Lantern Corps #37–41
07	Darkstars Rising	January, 2019	978-1401285647	Hal Jordan and the Green Lantern Corps #42–50

=== Green Lanterns (2016–2018) ===
Vol.	Title	Release date	ISBN	Contents
01	Rage Planet	January 31, 2017	978-1401267759	Green Lanterns: Rebirth #1; Green Lanterns: #1-6
02	Phantom Lantern	May 2, 2017	978-1401268497	Green Lanterns #7-14
03	Polarity	September 19, 2017	978-1401273712	Green Lanterns #15-21
04	The First Ring	December 26, 2017	978-1401275051	Green Lanterns #22-26
05	Out of Time	April 3, 2018	978-1401278793	Green Lanterns #27-32
06	A World of Our Own	July 3, 2018	978-1401280666	Green Lanterns #33-39
07	Superhuman Trafficking	October 9, 2018	978-1401284541	Green Lanterns #40-43; Green Lanterns Annual #1
08	Ghosts of the Past	February 5, 2019	978-1401285906	Green Lanterns #44-49
09	Evil's Might	June 4, 2019	978-1401293826	Green Lanterns #50-57

=== The Green Lantern (2019–2021) ===
Vol.	Title	Release date	ISBN	Contents
01	Intergalactic Lawman	July 2019	978-1401291396	The Green Lantern #1-6
02	The Day the Stars Fell	December 2019	978-1401295356	The Green Lantern #7-12; The Green Lantern Annual #1
01	Season Two Vol. 1	December 2020	978-1779505538	Green Lantern: Blackstars #1-3; The Green Lantern: Season Two #1-6
02	Season Two Vol. 2: Ultrawar	July 2021	978-1779510181	The Green Lantern: Season Two #7-12

=== Green Lantern Vol. 6 (2021–2022) ===
Vol.	Title	Release date	ISBN	Contents
01	Invictus	December 21. 2021	9781779513373	Future State: Green Lantern #1-2; Green Lantern vol. 6 #1-4.
02	Horatius	July 5, 2022	9781779515544	Green Lantern vol. 6 #5-12; Green Lantern Annual 2021 #1

=== Green Lantern Vol. 7 (2023–present) ===
Vol.	Title	Release date	ISBN	Contents
01	Back in Action	June 4, 2024	978-1779525093	Green Lantern vol 7. #1-6; Knight Terrors: Green Lantern #1-2
02	Love and War	February 25, 2025	978-1799500506	Green Lantern vol 7. #7-12
03	Power of Will	May 20, 2025	978-1799501435	Green Lantern vol 7. #13-15; Absolute Power: Task Force VII #3
04	Civil Corps	August 6, 2025	978-1799502333	Green Lantern vol 7. #16-18; Green Lantern: Civil Corps Special #1; Green Lantern: Fractured Spectrum #1
05	Fractured Spectrum	February 17, 2026	978-1799507567	Green Lantern vol 7. #19-24
06	With This Ring	August 26, 2026	978-1799509387	Green Lantern vol 7. #28-33

=== Collections with multi-series spans ===
- Green Lantern Corps: Through The Ages collects Green Lantern vol. 2 #30, Green Lantern vol. 4 #3, Showcase #22, Green Lantern Gallery, Green Lantern: Emerald Dawn #4 and Green Lantern Secret Files and Origins 2005
- Green Lantern: In Brightest Day collects Green Lantern vol. 2 #7, 40, 59, 162, 173, 177, 182, 183 and 188, Green Lantern vol. 3 #51, Green Lantern Corps Quarterly #6 and Green Lantern Corps Annual #2, 978-1-4012-1986-4
- Green Lantern: The Greatest Stories Ever Told collects Green Lantern vol. 2 #1, 31, 74, 87, 172, Green Lantern vol. 3 #3, Flash/Green Lantern: Brave/Bold #2, Showcase #22 and Green Lantern Secret Files and Origins 2005, 1-4012-0961-0

=== Miniseries ===
- Green Lantern: Circle of Fire Collects Green Lantern and Adam Strange #1, Green Lantern and Firestorm the Nuclear Man #1, Green Lantern and Green Lantern #1, Green Lantern and Power Girl #1, Green Lantern and the Atom #1, & Green Lantern: Circle Of Fire #1–2.
