= List of black superheroes =

This is a list of black superheroes that lists characters found in comic books and other media. The characters are superheroes That are black people.

== Comic books ==
=== Adeolah ===
Name	Alter Ego(s)	Teams/Associations	First Appearance	Year	Date	Writer	Artist	Ref
Kam		Grand Nubians						
Shu		Grand Nubians						
Hapi		Grand Nubians						
Aton		Grand Nubians						

=== Captain Underpants universe ===
Name	Alter Ego(s)	Teams/Associations	First Appearance	Year	Date	Writer	Artist	Ref
Super Diaper Baby	Billy Hoskins		The Adventures of Super Diaper Baby		2002	Dav Pilkey (as George Beard)	Dav Pilkey (as Harold Hutchins)	

=== Continuity Comics ===
Name	Alter Ego(s)	Teams/Associations	First Appearance	Year	Date	Writer	Artist	Ref
Cyclone		the Hybrids						
Knighthawk	Scott Pike							

=== Daathrekh Publishing ===
Name	Alter Ego(s)	Teams/Associations	First Appearance	Year	Date	Writer	Artist	Ref
NETERS		Ma'atan Code; Team Heru; Retu-Guardsmen	Daathrekh.com		December-98	Edward Uzzle		

=== Demond Comics ===
Name	Alter Ego(s)	Teams/Associations	First Appearance	Year	Date	Writer	Artist	Ref
Demond	Carl Sims		Demond Comics			Antonio Hutton		

=== Dark Horse Comics ===
Name	Alter Ego(s)	Teams/Associations	First Appearance	Year	Date	Writer	Artist	Ref
Counterstrike			Comics' Greatest World					
Plexus ^{[A]}			Nexus: Executioner's Song #3		August 1996	Mike Baron	Steve Rude	
Wolf Ferrell		Wolf Gang	Comics Greatest World					
Sistah Spooky	Theresa	Superhomeys	Empowered	2007		Adam Warren	Adam Warren	

=== DC Comics ===
Name	Alter Ego(s)	Teams/Associations	First Appearance	Year	Date	Writer	Artist	Ref
Amazing-Man	Will Everett	All-Star Squadron	All-Star Squadron #23	1983		Roy Thomas	Jerry Ordway	
Amazing-Man	Will Everett III	Justice League of America, Extreme Justice, Justice League Europe	Justice League of America (vol. 2) #86	1994				
Amazing-Man	Markus Clay	Justice Society of America		2007				
Amazing-Man	Rocker Bonn	Checkmate	OMAC (vol. 3) #2	2011		Dan DiDio	Keith Giffen	
Amber ^{[A1]}		Searcher's Inc.	Just Imagine... Batman	2001	September	Stan Lee		
Aqualad	Jackson Hyde/Kaldur'ahm	Teen Titans, Young Justice	Brightest Day #9	2010	September	Greg Weisman, Brandon Vietti, Geoff Johns	Phil Bourassa, Ivan Reis	
Atom		Justice Alliance of America	Legends of the DC Universe: Crisis on Infinite Earths #1	1999	February	Marv Wolfman		
August Durant		Secret Six	Secret Six #113	1968	April	E. Nelson Bridwell	Frank Springer	
Batman	Wayne Williams		Just Imagine's Stan Lee's Batman	2001		Stan Lee	Joe Kubert	
Batwing	David Zavimbe	Batman Inc., Justice League International	Batman Inc. #5	2011		Grant Morrison	Chris Burnham	
Batwing	Luke Fox	Batman Inc.,	Batwing #20	2013		Grant Morrison	Chris Burnham	
Betty Clawman		New Guardians	Millennium #2	1988	January	Steve Englehart	Joe Staton	
Big Thunder			Bulleteer miniseries					
Black Eagle	Lt. Cassius Bannister		All-Out War #1		1979			
Black Lightning	Jefferson Pierce	Justice League, Outsiders	Black Lightning #1	1977		Tony Isabella	Trevor Von Eeden	
Black Racer	Sgt. Willie Walker	New Gods	New Gods #3	1971		Jack Kirby	Jack Kirby	
Black Spider	Eric Needham		Detective Comics #463	1976				
Black Vulcan		Super Friends	The All-New Super Friends Hour	1977	September	Hanna-Barbera	Alex Toth	
Blackwing	Charlie Bullock		Wonder Woman #297		1982	Paul Levitz, Joey Cavalieri	Joe Staton	
Blindside	Tyson Gilford		Relative Heroes			Devin Grayson	Yvel Guichet, Mark Propst, Aaron Sowd	
Blob			Speed Demon #1	1996				
Bloodsport	Robert DuBois		Superman (vol. 2) #4	1987		John Byrne	John Byrne	
Bloodwynd		JLA	Justice League of America (vol. 2) #61	1992		Dan Jurgens	Dan Jurgens	
Blue Lantern	Rowan Kent	Blue Lantern Corps	Future State: House of El (vol. 1) #61	2021	April	Philip Kennedy Johnson	Gabe Eltaeb	
Bronze Tiger	Ben Turner	Suicide Squad	Richard Dragon, Kung Fu Fighter #1	1975	April	Denny O'Neil	Jim Berry	
Bumblebee	Karen Beecher-Duncan	Doom Patrol/Teen Titans/Titans West	Teen Titans #48	1977	June	Bob Rozakis	José Delbo	
Cal Durham^{[A]}			Aquaman #57	1977		David Michelinie	Jim Aparo	
Captain Marvel			Elseworld's Finest	1998				
Carla White		Darkstars	Darkstars #1	1992	October	Michael Jan Friedman	Larry Stroman	
Cascade	Rhiah Douglas	Sovereign Seven	Sovereign Seven #1	1995				
Catspaw	April Dumaka	Legion of Super-Heroes	Legion of Super-Heroes (vol. 4) #33	1992	September			
Centaur^{[E]}	Eran Shadowstorm		Warlord					
Chunk^{[B]}	Chester P. Runk		The Flash (vol. 2) #9			Mike Baron	Jackson Guice	
Coldcast	Nathan Jones	Justice League Elite	Action Comics #775		2001			
The Commander		New Gods						
Computo	Danielle Foccart	Legion of Super-Heroes	Legion of Super-Heroes (vol. 2) Annual #1		1982	Paul Levitz	Keith Giffen	
Conjura^{[C]}								
Crispus Allen			Detective Comics #742	2000	March	Greg Rucka	Shawn Martinbrough	
Crimson Avenger	Jill Carlyle		STARS AND S.T.R.I.P.E. #9	2000		Geoff Johns	Scott Kolins	
Crimson Avenger (Earth 2)	Lee Travis		Earth 2 #5	2012		James Robinson	Nicola Scott	
Crystallex^{[D]}	Raphael Harris		New Teen Titans					
Cyborg	Victor Stone	Teen Titans, Justice League	DC Comics Presents #26	1980		Marv Wolfman	George Pérez	
Dale Gunn			Justice League Detroit					
Darla Dudley	Shazam	Shazam Family	Flashpoint #1	2011	May	Geoff Johns	Andy Kubert	
Data	Freddie Martin		Thriller	1983				
Dawn	Rachel Niamo		Batwing #13	2012		Judd Winick	Marcus To	
Dawnfire		The Kingdom	Batwing #4	2011		Judd Winick	ChrisCross	
Doctor Mid-Nite	Dr. Beth Chapel	Infinity Inc.	Infinity Inc. #19	1985	October	Roy Thomas	Todd McFarlane	
Doctor Mist	Nommo	Global Guardians, Justice League Dark	Super Friends #12	1978	June	E. Nelson Bridwell	Ramona Fradon	
Earth Strike	Dede Yeboah	The Kingdom	Batwing #1	2011	September	Judd Winick	Ben Oliver	
Empress	Anita Fite	Young Justice	Young Justice #16	2000	January	Peter David	Todd Nauck	
FerAlyse / ZuLuLu^{[F]}	Jackee Jones		Netherworld					
4D	Captain Lea Corben	Ultramarine Corps						
Firestorm	Jason Rusch	Justice League	Firestorm (vol. 3) #1	2004	July	Dan Jolley	ChrisCross	
Flex & Thermal		Suicide Squad						
Flipper-Dipper		The Newsboy Legion	Superman's Pal Jimmy Olsen #133	1970	October	Jack Kirby	Jack Kirby	
Freedom Beast	Dominic Mndawe	Global Guardians	Animal Man #13	1989	July	Grant Morrison		
Freight Train		Outsiders	Outsiders (vol. 4) #30	2010	July 2010	Dan DiDio	Philip Tan	
Gary Washington		Checkmate operative						
Gear	I.Z.O.R.	Legion of Super-Heroes						
Ghost Lion		Hypotheticals	JLA Classified #16					
Glenn Gammeron^{[G]}			Justice League Task Force #28					
Gravedigger	Captain Ulysses Hazard	Easy Company	Men of War #1	1977	August	David Michelinie	Ed Davis	
Gravedigger	Tyson Sykes		Checkmate (vol. 2) #14	1989	April	Paul Kupperberg	Tod Smith	
Green Arrow	Connor Hawke	Justice League	Green Arrow (vol. 2) #0 (1994)	1994	October	Kelley Puckett	Jim Aparo	
Green Lantern	John Stewart	Green Lantern Corps, Justice League, Darkstars	Green Lantern #87	1971	December	Denny O'Neil	Neal Adams	
Grover Baines			Blackhawk (vol. 3) #2					
Gus Gray^{[H]}	Cpl. Augustus Gray		Haunted Tank					
Hawkgirl	Kendra Munoz-Saunders	Wonders of the World (Justice Society of Earth-2)	Earth-2 #4	2012	September	James Robinson, Tom Taylor	Eduardo Pansica	
Hawkgirl	Kendra Saunders (Rebirth reboot)	the Immortals, Blackhawks	Dark Nights: Metal #1	2012	August	Scott Snyder	Greg Capullo	
Healer Randolph^{[I]}		Tomahawk's Rangers	Son of Tomahawk #128					
Hero Cruz		Superboy and the Ravers/Titans L.A.	Superboy and the Ravers #1	1996	September 1996	Karl Kesel	Steve Mattsson	
Impala	M'Balaze	Global Guardians	Super Friends #7	1977	October	E. Nelson Bridwell	Ramona Fradon	
Invisible Kid	Jacques Foccart	Legion of Super-Heroes	Legion of Super-Heroes Annual (vol. 2) #1	1982		Paul Levitz	Keith Giffen	
Iron		Metal Men	Showcase #37	1962				
Jackie Johnson		Easy Company	Our Army at War #113	1961	December	Bob Kanigher	Joe Kubert	
Jakeem Thunder	Jakeem Johnny Williams	JSA	The Flash (vol. 2) #134	1998		Grant Morrison, Mark Millar	Paul Ryan	
Jet	Celia Windward	New Guardians, Global Guardian	Millenium #8	1988	January	Steve Engelhart	Joe Staton	
Jim Corrigan^{[K]}								
Jody^{[L]}			Tomahawk					
Josiah Power		The Power Company	JLA #61	2002	February	Kurt Busiek	Tom Grummett	
Joto/Hot Spot	Isaiah Crockett	Teen Titans	Teen Titans (vol. 2) #1	1996	October	Dan Jurgens	Dan Jurgens	
Kid Impala		Ultramarine Corps						
Juice		Ultimen						
Kid Quantum	James Cullen	Legion of Super-Heroes	Legionnaires #62	1998	September	Tom Bierbaum, Mary Bierbaum	David A. Williams	
Kid Quantum	Jazmin Cullen	Legion of Super-Heroes				Tom Peyer, Tom McCraw	Lee Moder	
King Peacock		Top Ten	Top Ten #1					
Lady Liberty			Battle for Blüdhaven					
Lightning	Jennifer Pierce	Justice Society of America	Kingdom Come #1	1996		Mark Waid	Alex Ross	
Machiste^{[M]}			Warlord #2	1976	March	Mike Grell	Mike Grell	
Manhattan Guardian	Jake Jordan	Seven Soldiers of Victory	The Manhattan Guardian #1	2005	May	Grant Morrison	Cameron Stewart	
Maximum	Maxwell Williams	Supermen of America	Supermen of America (vol. 2) #1	2000	March	Fabian Nicieza	Doug Braithwaite	
Mbulaze			Super Friends #7	1977				
Micro-Maid		Top Ten	Top Ten #1					
Microwavebelle		Hero Hotline						
Mister Bones^{[O]}		Infinity Inc.	Infinity, Inc. #16	1985	July	Roy Thomas, Dann Thomas	Todd McFarlane	
Mister Miracle	Shilo Norman	Seven Soldiers of Victory, New Gods	Mister Miracle #15	1973	August	Jack Kirby	Jack Kirby	
Mister Terrific	Michael Holt	JSA, The Terrifics, JLA, Checkmate	The Spectre (vol. 3) #54	1997	June	John Ostrander	Tom Mandrake	
Mohammed Ibn Bornu^{[P]}		Cadre of the Immortal						
Molo^{[Q]}	Molo	International Sea Devil	Sea Devils #23	1965	May	Bob Haney	Howard Purcell	
Mongrel		Blood Pack						
Muhammad X			Superman (vol. 2) #179	2002	August	Jeph Loeb, Geoff Johns	Ariel Olivetti	
Ndoki	Charles Ndoki	S.T.A.R. Corps	S.T.A.R. Corps #3	1998	January	Dan Vado	Norman Felchle	
New Moon		Moondancers	World's Finest Comics #295	1983	September			
Northwind	Norda Cantrell	Infinity, Inc.	All-Star Squadron #25	1983	September	Roy Thomas	Jerry Ordway	
Nubia^{[S]}			Wonder Woman #206	1973	January	Robert Kanigher	Don Heck	
Obatala, Lord of the White Cloth								
Onyx	Onyx Adams							
Orpheus	Gavin King		Batman: Orpheus Rising	2001	October	Alex Simmons	Dwayne Turner	
Pantha	Rosabelle Mendez	Teen Titans	The New Titans #73	2001	February	Marv Wolfman	Tom Grummett	
Percival Hazard		Squad K						
Philippus	Philippus	Amazons	Wonder Woman (vol. 2) #1	1987	February	George Pérez	George Pérez	
Ralph Jackson	Ralph Jackson	United States Army	World's Finest Comics #17	1945	Spring	Jack Schiff	John Daly	
Rocket	Raquel Ervin	Shadow Cabinet	Icon #1	1993	May	Dwayne McDuffie	M. D. Bright	
Rupert Zambesi Kenboya			Showcase #66	1967		Bob Haney	Mike Sekowsky	
Rush & Silence			Superman (vol. 2) #179	2002	August 2002			
Samosa		Kid Lanterns from Green Lantern Mosaic						
Scrap^{[V]}		D.E.O.rphans	Titans (vol. 4) #26					
Sela^{[W]}		JLA (Obsidian Age)						
Seraph^{[U]}		DNAngels	Superboy (vol. 3) #88		July 2001			
Shango the Thunderer								
Shondra Kinsolving^{[W1]}								
Signal	Duke Thomas	Batman (partnership)/ Team Batman, The Outsiders						
Sir Gawain			Camelot 3000 #3	1983				
Skitter	Celine Patterson	Teen Titans	Superboy (vol. 5) #1	2011		Scott Lobdell	Brett Booth	
Skyrocket	Cecelia Forrestal	The Power Company	JLA #61	2002	February	Kurt Busiek	Tom Grummett	
Sojourner^{[X]}	Henrietta Jessup							
The Solution^{[Y]}		Young Justice						
Sonik^{[Z]}								
The Spectre	Crispus Allen		Infinite Crisis #4	2006	March	Geoff Johns	Phil Jimenez	
Star Boy			Legion of Superheroes (vol. 4) #1	2005				
Steel	John Henry Irons	Justice League	The Adventures of Superman #500	1993	June	Louise Simonson	Jon Bogdanove	
Steel / Vaporlock	Natasha Irons	Lex Luthor's Everyman Project, Infinity Inc.	Steel (vol. 2) #1	1994	February	Louise Simonson	Chris Batista	
Static	Virgil Ovid Hawkins	Teen Titans, Justice League, S.T.A.R. Labs	Static #1	1993	June 1993			
Superman (Earth-23)	Calvin Ellis	Multiverse Earth 23, Justice League, S.T.A.R. Labs	Final Crisis #7	2009	March 2009			
Superman Earth 2	Val-Zod	Multiverse Earth 2, Justice League, S.T.A.R. Labs	Earth 2 #19	2014	March 2014			
Stoneyard			Superman (vol. 2) #179	2002	August 2002			
Strix	Mary	Court of Owls, Birds of Prey	Batgirl (vol. 3) #9	2012	May	Gail Simone	Ardian Syaf	
Superman & Supergirl of Earth-D		Justice Alliance of America	Legends of the DC Universe: Crisis on Infinite Earths	1999				
Superman	Harvey Dent		Tangent Comics: Superman #1	1997				
Syn	Synaethesia Jackson	Top Ten	Top Ten #1					
Tattooed Man	Mark Richards	Justice League, Titans	Green Lantern (vol. 4) #9	2006	April	Geoff Johns		
Technocrat	Geoffrey Brown	Outsiders	Outsiders (vol. 2) #1 Alpha	1993	1993	Mike W. Barr	Paul Pelletier	
Ted & Terri Trapper								
Tempest	Martin Ellis^{[N]}	Doom Patrol	Showcase #94	1977		Paul Kupperberg	Joe Staton	
Thunder	Anissa Pierce	Outsiders	Outsiders (vol. 3) #1	2003	August	Judd Winick	Tom Raney	
Thunder Fall		The Kingdom	Batwing #2	2011		Judd Winick	Ben Oliver	
Tyroc	Troy Stewart	Legion of Super-Heroes	Superboy and the Legion of Super-Heroes #216	1976	April	Cary Bates	Mike Grell	
Underground			Superman (vol. 2) #179	2002	August 2002			
Vixen	Mari Jiwe McCabe	JLA, Suicide Squad, International Ultramarine Corps, JLI	Action Comics #521	1981	July	Gerry Conway	Bob Oksner	
Vox, Herald, Hornblower, Guardian	Mal Duncan	Teen Titans, Doom Patrol	Teen Titans #26	1970	March	Bob Kanigher	Nick Cardy.	
Vykin		Forever People	Forever People #1	1971	February	Jack Kirby	Jack Kirby	
Wilson Forbes^{[A3]}								
Wonder Woman	Diana Prince		DC vs. Marvel #4	1996				
Wonder Woman of Earth 23	Nubia	Justice League	Final Crisis #7	2009		Grant Morrison	Doug Mahnke.	
Wyldeheart^{[A4]}								
Xero	Coltrane "Trane" Walker							
XS	Jenni Ognats	Legion of Super-Heroes	Legionnaires #0	1994	October	Tom McCraw	Jeff Moy	
Zeke^{[A5]}		D.E.O.rphans	Titans (vol. 4) #26					

=== Dell Comics ===
Name	Alter Ego(s)	Teams/Associations	First Appearance	Year	Date	Writer	Artist	Ref
Lobo ^{[A]}			Lobo #1	1965	December	Don “D.J.” Arneson	Tony Tallarico	

=== Disney Comics ===
Name	Alter Ego(s)	Teams/Associations	First Appearance	Year	Date	Writer	Artist	Ref
Taranee Cook		W.I.T.C.H.	W.I.T.C.H. #1	2001	April	Elisabetta Gnone	Alessandro Barbucci	

=== Dorkstorm ===
Name	Alter Ego(s)	Teams/Associations	First Appearance	Year	Date	Writer	Artist	Ref
Black Ice ^{[A]}	Bobby Blaque							

=== Eclipse Comics ===
Name	Alter Ego(s)	Teams/Associations	First Appearance	Year	Date	Writer	Artist	Ref
Crackshot	Lee Alexander Clayton	The Liberty Project and Teenagents						
The Firedrake			Miracleman					
Polestar ^{[A]}		The New Wave						
Roboto ^{[B]}		Team Youngblood						
Sabre ^{[C]}								
Simon Ashley		James D. Hudnall's ESPERS						
Strike ^{[D]}	Dennis Foreman							
Terrayne	Harry Robinson	the Futurians						

=== Epic Comics ===
Name	Alter Ego(s)	Teams/Associations	First Appearance	Year	Date	Writer	Artist	Ref
Black Eagle		Wild Cards						
Captain Confederacy			Captain Confederacy		1991	Will Shetterly	Vince Stone	
Fortunato		Wild Cards						
Harlem Hammer		Wild Cards						
Spirit of the People			Captain Confederacy		1991	Will Shetterly	Vince Stone	

=== First Comics ===
Name	Alter Ego(s)	Teams/Associations	First Appearance	Year	Date	Writer	Artist	Ref
Alis Krafe		Meta 4						

=== Fleetway/Quality ===
Name	Alter Ego(s)	Teams/Associations	First Appearance	Year	Date	Writer	Artist	Ref
Cleve		New Statesmen (Ohio)						
Meridian		New Statesmen (Mississippi)						

=== The Guardian Line UMI ===
Name	Alter Ego(s)	Teams/Associations	First Appearance	Year	Date	Writer	Artist	Ref
Code^{[A]}								
Joe		Joe & Max						
Genesis 5	two unknown members							

=== Icon Comics ===
Name	Alter Ego(s)	Teams/Associations	First Appearance	Year	Date	Writer	Artist	Ref
Benmarley		FG3, Powers						
Boogie Girl		FG3, Powers						
Teague		Powers						
Unnamed Amazon		the Golden Ones, Powers						
Wazz		FG3, Powers						

=== Image Comics ===
Name	Alter Ego(s)	Teams/Associations	First Appearance	Year	Date	Writer	Artist	Ref
American Pi ^{[A]}		Common Grounds						
Ant	Hannah Washington		Ant #1		March 2004	Mario Gully		
Black Samson						Robert Kirkman		
Blindspot	Murdock Ellison		Tribe #1		March 1993	Todd Johnson	Larry Stroman	
Bulletproof						Robert Kirkman		
Chapel	Bruce Stinson		Youngblood					
The Crush	J.C. Pratt		The Crush #1		January 1996			
Darkwing								
Kittycat		Liberty Balance, Common Grounds						
Longfellow			Wildguard					
Mach Master			Wildguard					
Mayhem!	Dante		Mayhem! #1		October 2009	Tyrese Gibson	Tone Rodriguez	
Optica			Wildguard					
Psi-Mistress			Wildguard					
Rapture	Sharona Jackson		The Savage Dragon #4					
Sentinel			Youngblood					
Star	Chris Robinson		The Savage Dragon #1		January 1993	Erik Larsen		
Shadowhawk			Shadowhawk #1					
Spawn	Albert Simmons	CIA	Spawn #1		June 1992	Todd McFarlane		
Toughlon			Wildguard					

=== Impact Comics ===
Name	Alter Ego(s)	Teams/Associations	First Appearance	Year	Date	Writer	Artist	Ref
Black Hood	Giles "Hit" Coffee							

=== Innovation ===
Name	Alter Ego(s)	Teams/Associations	First Appearance	Year	Date	Writer	Artist	Ref
Unknown Black Male		Group Larue						
Penn								

=== Independent comics ===
Name	Alter Ego(s)	Teams/Associations	First Appearance	Year	Date	Writer	Artist	Ref
Elijah Wallace			ENGLEWOOD#1		2019	Micah Curtis	Armand Strange	

=== Kitchen Sink ===
Name	Alter Ego(s)	Teams/Associations	First Appearance	Year	Date	Writer	Artist	Ref
Miss			Megaton Man					
Silver-Age			Megaton Man					

=== Leader Comics Group ===
Name	Alter Ego(s)	Teams/Associations	First Appearance	Year	Date	Writer	Artist	Ref
Blackman	Steve Thomas		Blackman #1	1981		Tom Floyd	Eric O'Kelly	

=== Lion Forge Comics ===
Name	Alter Ego(s)	Teams/Associations	First Appearance	Year	Date	Writer	Artist	Ref
Noble	David Powell		Noble Vol.1: God Shots		2017	Brandon Thomas	Roger Robinson	

=== Lone Star Press ===
Name	Alter Ego(s)	Teams/Associations	First Appearance	Year	Date	Writer	Artist	Ref
Midas			Pantheon			Bill Willingham		
Tangaroa			Pantheon			Bill Willingham		

=== Malibu (Ultraverse) ===
Name	Alter Ego(s)	Teams/Associations	First Appearance	Year	Date	Writer	Artist	Ref
Aura		Protectors						
Chalice		Protectors						
D.J. Blast		The Squad						
Yrial		Strangers						
Grip		Strangers						
Zip Zap		Strangers						
Book		The Solution						

=== Marvel Comics ===
Name	Alter Ego(s)	Teams/Associations	First Appearance	Year	Date	Writer	Artist	Ref
3-D Man, Triathlon	Delroy Garrett	Skrull Kill Krew; The Initiative; Point Men; Avengers; Triune Understanding; Agents of Atlas	Avengers (vol. 3) #8	1998	September 1998	Kurt Busiek	George Pérez	
Abraham Brown		Sons of the Tiger	Deadly Hands of Kung Fu #1	1974				
Adept	Jelene Anderson	Strikeforce Morituri	Strikeforce: Morituri#1	1984				
Aegis	Trey Rollins	New Warriors	The New Warriors (vol. 2) #0	1999	June	Jay Faerber	Steve Scott	
Agent Storm/Tempest	William Read	X-Force	Cloak and Dagger (vol. 3) #9	1989	December	Terry Austin	Mike Vosburg	
Alex Wilder		Runaways	Runaways #1	2003				
Anarchist	Tike Alicar	X-Force, X-Statix	X-Force #116	2001	July	Peter Milligan	Mike Allred	
Angel	Angel Salvadore	X-Men, New Warriors, Teen Brigade	New X-Men #118	2001	2001	Grant Morrison	Ethan Van Sciver	
Attractive Lad	Aundray Phelps	Crazy Eights	Wonder Man #4	1991				
Axe		Harriers	Wolverine (vol. 2) #5	1989				
Bandit / Night Thrasher	Donyell Taylor	New Warriors/Avengers Resistance/Counter Force	Night Thrasher #3	1993				
Battlestar, Bucky	Lemar Hoskins	Buckies, partner of Captain America, Wild Pack	Captain America #323	1986	November	Mark Gruenwald	Paul Neary	
Bedlam	Jesse Aaronson	X-Force	X-Force #82	1998	October	John Francis Moore	Jim Cheung	
Ben Payton		Seeker 3000	Marvel Premiere #41	1978				
The Black Musketeers ^{[A]}	Dr. Joshua Itobo, Ishanta, and Khanata		Black Panther #9	1978				
Black Panther	T'Challa	Avengers, Defenders, Fantastic Force, Fantastic Four Illuminati	Fantastic Four #52	1966	July	Stan Lee	Jack Kirby	
Black Talon	Desmond Drew	Cult Leader	Strange Tales #173	1974	April	Len Wein	Gene Colan	
Black Talon	Samuel Barone	Lethal Legion, X-Humed	Avengers #152	1976	October	Gerry Conway	John Buscema	
Blade	Eric Brooks	Nightstalkers, Midnight Sons, Vanguard, MI-13	Tomb of Dracula #10	1973	July 1973	Marv Wolfman	Gene Colan	
Bling!	Roxanne "Roxy" Washington	New X-Men	X-Men (vol. 2) #171	2005				
Blitziana		Godpack	Mighty Thor #473	1994	April	Roy Thomas	M.C. Wyman	
Blue Marvel	Adam Brashear		Adam: Legend of the Blue Marvel #1	2008	November	Kevin Grevioux	Mat Broome	
Blur	Stanley Stewart	Squadron Supreme	Supreme Power #1	2003				
Brother Voodoo	Jericho Drumm	Midnight Sons	Strange Tales #169	1973	September	Len Wein	Gene Colan	
Captain America	Isaiah Bradley		Truth: Red, White & Black #1	2003				
Captain Marvel, Photon, Pulsar	Monica Rambeau	Avengers, Nextwave	The Amazing Spider-Man Annual #16	1982		Roger Stern	John Romita, Jr.	
Captain Universe		Avengers	Avengers (vol. 5) #1	2012	December 2012	Jonathan Hickman	Jerome Opeña	
Cardiac	Elias Wirtham		The Amazing Spider-Man #342	1990	December	David Michelinie	Erik Larsen	
Derek Morgan		Ultimate X	Ultimate X #3	2010				
Frenzy	Joanna Cargill	Alliance of Evil, Femizons, Acolytes, X-Men, X-Factor	X-Factor #4	1986	May	Bob Layton	Keith Pollard	
Cecilia Reyes		X-Men, X-Factor	X-Men (vol. 2) #65	1997				
Charcoal	Charlie Burlingame	Thunderbolts	Thunderbolts #19	1998	October	Kurt Busiek	Mark Bagley	
Chord	Andrew Chord	New Warriors ally	Thor #411	1989				
Cloak	Tyrone "Ty" Johnson	Secret Avengers, Dark X-Men, X-Men	Peter Parker, the Spectacular Spider-Man #64	1982	March	Bill Mantlo	Ed Hannigan	
Darwin	Armando Muñoz	X-Men, X-Factor Investigations	X-Men: Deadly Genesis #2	2006	February	Ed Brubaker	Pete Woods	
Deathlok	Michael Collins	Secret Defenders	Astonishing Tales #25	1974	August	Doug Moench, Gregory Wright	George Pérez	
Debrii	Deborah Fields	New Warriors	New Warriors (vol. 3) #4	2005				
Doorman	DeMarr Davis	Great Lakes Avengers/X-Men/Champions/Initiative	West Coast Avengers (vol. 2) #46	1989	July	John Byrne	John Byrne	
Falcon	Sam Wilson	partner of Captain America, S.H.I.E.L.D. Super Agents, Defenders, Avengers	Captain America #117	1969	September	Stan Lee	Gene Colan	
Gabe Jones		Howling Commandos, S.H.I.E.L.D., Godzilla Squad	Sgt. Fury #1	1963	May	Stan Lee	Jack Kirby	
Gauntlet	Joseph Green		Civil War Battle Damage Report #1	2007				
Genii		Young Gods	Thor #202	1972				
Georgianna Castleberry		Team America	Team America #2	1982				
Girth		Happy Campers	NFL SuperPro #10	1992				
G. W. Bridge		Six Pack, S.H.I.E.L.D., Weapon P.R.I.M.E.	X-Force #1	1991	August	Rob Liefeld, Fabian Nicieza	Rob Liefeld	
Goblyn	Goblyn Dean	Derangers, Beta Flight, Gamma Flight	Alpha Flight #53	1987	December	Bill Mantlo	Terry Shoemaker	
Goliath, Giant-Man, Black Goliath	Bill Foster	Ally of Avengers, technical advisor to Champions, Defenders, Project Pegasus	Avengers #32	1966	September	Stan Lee	Don Heck	
Goliath	Tom Foster	Damage Control, Revengers	Black Panther (vol. 4) #23	2007	February 2007	Reginald Hudlin	Koi Turnbull	
"Hammer" Eisenhower		Six Pack	X-Force #8	1992	March	Rob Liefeld, Fabian Nicieza	Rob Liefeld, Mike Mignola	
Harrier, Cardinal	Donald Clendenon	Air Force, Masters of Evil, Thunderbolts	New Warriors #28	1992	October	Fabian Nicieza	Darick Robertson	
Heather Hudson		Exiles	Exiles #10	2002				
High-Tech, Chemistro	Curtis Carr		Hero for Hire #12	1973	August	Steve Englehart	George Tuska	
Hit-Maker			Wonder Man Annual #2	1993				
Horus		Heliopolitan Gods	Thor #239	1975	September	Roy Thomas	Sal Buscema	
Human Top	David Mitchell	Kid Commandos, Penance Council, V-Battalion	Invaders #27	1978	April	Roy Thomas	Frank Robbins	
Hybrid	Scott Washington	New Warriors	New Warriors #21	1992				
Ironheart	Riri Williams		Invincible Iron Man (vol. 3) #7	2016	May, 2016	Brian Michael Bendis	Mike Deodato	
Isis		Heliopolitan Gods	Thor #239	1975	September	Roy Thomas	Sal Buscema	
Josiah X	Josiah al hajj Saddiq, Josiah Bradley	The Crew	The Crew #1	2003	September	Christopher Priest	Joe Bennett	
Jughandle	Jesse Metuchen	The Craptacular B-Sides	Craptacular B-Sides #1	2002		Brian David-Marshall	Brett Weldele	
Kasper Cole		The Crew	Black Panther (vol. 3 #50)	2002				
Kestrel	John Wraith		Wolverine (vol. 2) #48	1991				
"Licorice" Calhoun			Fantastic Four #291	1986				
Lightbright		Wild Pack	Silver Sable and the Wild Pack #16	1993				
Longstrike	Christine Cord	New Warriors	New X-Men #126	2002				
Power Man/Luke Cage	Carl Lucas	Fantastic Four, Defenders, New Avengers	Hero for Hire #1	1972	June	Archie Goodwin, John Romita, Sr., & Roy Thomas	George Tuska	
M	Monet St. Croix	Generation X, X-Men, X-Corporation, X-Factor Investigations, Hellfire Club	Uncanny X-Men #316	1994		Scott Lobdell	Chris Bachalo	
M'Shulla	M'Shulla Scott	Killraven's Freemen	Amazing Adventures (vol. 2) #19	1973	July	Gerry Conway	Howard Chaykin	
Maggott	Japheth	X-Men, Generation X	Uncanny X-Men #345	1997	June	Scott Lobdell	Joe Madureira	
Code: Blue	Marcus Stone		Thor #404	1989				
Maxam			Warlock and the Infinity Watch #12	1993				
Meteor Man	Jefferson Reed		Meteor Man: The Movie #1	1993				
Midnight Sun	M'Nai	ally of Shang-Chi	Special Marvel Edition #16	1974				
Mister Gideon	Gideon Wilson	Gamma Corps. Older brother of Falcon	World War Hulk: Gamma Corps #1	2007				
Misty Knight		Daughters of the Dragon, Heroes for Hire	Marvel Team-Up #1	1972	March 1972	Tony Isabella, Roy Thomas	Ross Andru	
Meteorite	Valerie Barnhardt		Thunderbolts #48	2001				
Nick Fury, Jr.	Marcus Johnson	S.H.I.E.L.D., Secret Avengers	Battle Scars #1	2012	2012	Matt Fraction, Chris Yost, Cullen Bunn, Paul Neary	Scot Eaton	
Night Thrasher	Dwayne Taylor/ Donyell Taylor	New Warriors/Counter Force	Thor #411	1989				
Nightmask	New Adam	Avengers	Avengers (vol. 5) #1	2013		Jonathan Hickman	Jerome Opena	
Nightwatch	Dr. Kevin Trench		Web of Spider-Man #97	1993				
N'Kantu, the Living Mummy			Supernatural Thrillers #5	1973				
Numinus		Power Pack	Power Pack #51	1989				
Osiris		Heliopolitan Gods	Thor #239	1975	September	Roy Thomas	Sal Buscema	
Pathway	Laura Dean	ally of Alpha Flight	Alpha Flight #48	1987				
Patriot	Elijah Bradley	Young Avengers	Young Avengers #1	2005		Alan Heinberg	Jim Cheung	
Patriot	Rayshaun Lucas	Champions, S.H.I.E.L.D.	Captain America: Sam Wilson #18	2017		Nick Spencer	Daniel Acuña	
Phaser	Christian Cord	New Warriors	New X-Men #126	2002				
Phastos		Eternals	Eternals (vol. 2) #1	1985				
Power Man	Victor Alvarez	Avengers Academy	Dark Reign: The List - Daredevil #1	2009	September	Fred Van Lente	Mahmud Asrar	
Prodigy	David Alleyne	New X-Men: Academy X	New Mutants (vol. 2) #4	2003				
Prowler	Hobie Brown		Amazing Spider-Man #78	1969				
Rage	Elvin Halliday	Avengers, New Warriors/Counter Force	Avengers #326	1990	November	Larry Hama	Paul Ryan	
Reno Jones		Gunhawks	Gunhawks #1	1972				
Rocket Racer	Robert Farrell		Amazing Spider-Man #172	1977				
Shard	Shard Bishop	X-Factor	Uncanny X-Men Annual #17	1993				
Shola Inkosi		Genoshan Excalibur	Mekanix #1	2002				
Silhouette	Silhouette Chord	New Warriors	New Warriors #2	1990				
Sister Voodoo	Vanna Black	hired by Brother Voodoo	Marvel Age Annual #3	1987				
Spider-Man	Miles Morales	Avengers, Web Warriors, Ultimates, Champions	Ultimate Comics: Fallout #4	2011	August 2011	Brian Michael Bendis	Sara Pichelli	
Splice		Young Gods	Thor #300	1980				
Sprocket	Amelia Barnhardt	employee of Night Thrasher	Night Thrasher: Four Control #2	1992				
Storm	Ororo Munroe	X-Men, Fantastic Four, Avengers, Uncanny X-Force	Giant-Size X-Men #1	1975				
Sun Girl	Selah Burke	New Warriors	Superior Spider-Man Team-Up #1	2013		Chris Yost		
Sunspot	Roberto Da Costa	New Mutants, X-Force, New Avengers, U.S. Avengers	Marvel Graphic Novel #4: The New Mutants	1982		Chris Claremont	Bob McLeod	
Synch	Everett Thomas	Generation X	X-Men (vol. 2) #36	1994				
Tag	Brian Cruz	New X-Men: Academy X	New Mutants (vol. 2) #10	2004				
Tempest	Becka Munroe	GeNext	GeNext #1	2008	July	Chris Claremont	Patrick Scherberger	
Terrayne	Harry Robbins	Futurians	Marvel Graphic Novel #9	1983		Dave Cockrum	Dave Cockrum	
Throg	Simon Walterson	Pet Avengers	Lockjaw and the Pet Avengers #1	2009	May	Chris Eliopoulos	Ig Guara	
Triage	Christopher Muse	Marauders, X-Men	All New X-Men #1	2012	November	Brian Michael Bendis	Stuart Immonen	
Valida Payton		Seeker 3000	Marvel Premiere #41	1978				
Venus Dee Milo		X-Statix	X-Statix #1	2002				
Vibrania		Ally of Speedball	Marvel Super-Heroes (vol. 2) #4	1990				
Vibraxas		Fantastic Force	Fantastic Four #391	1994				
Voodo Chile			Marvel Age Annual #3	1987				
War Machine/Briefly Iron Man	James "Rhodey" Rhodes	West Coast Avengers, The Crew, Secret Avengers	Iron Man #118	1979	January 1979	David Michelinie	Bob Layton	
Wes Cassady ^{[C]}			The Amazing Spider-Man #302	1988				
Wildstreak	Tamika Bowden	Fantastic Four ally	Fantastic Four Annual #26	1993				
Windshear	Colin Ashworth Hume	Alpha Flight	Alpha Flight #87	1990				

=== Marvel UK ===
Name	Alter Ego(s)	Teams/Associations	First Appearance	Year	Date	Writer	Artist	Ref
Doctor Crocodile ^{[B]}	Joshua N'Dingi		Captan Btain Vol.2 #9	1985	September 1985	Jamie Delano	Alan Davies	
Big Shot			Death's Head Vol.1 #4	1989	March 1989	Simon Furman	Bryan Hitch	
Green Knight		Knights of Pendragon						
Perez		Warheads (Kether Troop)	Warheads #1	1992	June 1992	Nick Vince	Gary Erskine	
Afrikaa ^{[A]}	Khairi Ngala		Black Axe #5	1993	August 1993	Simon Jowett	Edward Perryman	
Shift	Clifton Joseph		Code Name: GENETIX #1	1993	October 1993	Graham Marks, Andy Lanning	Phil Gascoine	
Howitzer		Gene Dogs	Gene Dogs #1	1993	October 1993	John Freeman	David Taylor	
Ultra Marine		Dark Guard	Dark Guard #1	1993	October 1993	Dan Abnett	Carlos Pacheco	
Death Wreck			Death III #1	1993	September 1993	Dan Abnett	Dell Barrass	

=== MC2 ===
Name	Alter Ego(s)	Teams/Associations	First Appearance	Year	Date	Writer	Artist	Ref
Blacklight	Kandra Freeman	A-Next	A-Next #9	1999				
Coal Tiger								
Daze								
Earth Sentry	John Foster	A-Next	A-Next #2					
"Fred" ^{[A]}								
Ladyhawk			Spider-Girl #6	1999				

=== Megaton Publishing ===
Name	Alter Ego(s)	Teams/Associations	First Appearance	Year	Date	Writer	Artist	Ref
Megaton	Matthew Scott		Megaton #1	1983	November 1983	Gary Carlson	Butch Guice	

=== Milestone Media ===
Name	Alter Ego(s)	Teams/Associations	First Appearance	Year	Date	Writer	Artist	Ref
Brick House		Blood Syndicate	Blood Syndicate #1	1993	April 1993	Dwayne McDuffie; Ivan Velez Jr.	Denys Cowan; Jimmy Palmiotti	
Bubbasaur	Bubba Brown	Blood Syndicate	Blood Syndicate #1	1994				
Buck Wild, Mercenary Man ^{[C]}	Rufus T. Wild		Icon #					
D-Struct ^{[A]}	Damon Briggs		Static #12	1994	April 1994	Kurt Busiek; Neil Vokes		
DMZ		Blood Syndicate	Blood Syndicate #1	1993	April 1993	Dwayne McDuffie; Ivan Velez Jr.	Denys Cowan; Jimmy Palmiotti	
Fade	Carlos Quinones	Blood Syndicate	Blood Syndicate #1	1993	April 1993	Dwayne McDuffie; Ivan Velez Jr.	Denys Cowan; Jimmy Palmiotti	
Flashback	Sara Quinones	Blood Syndicate	Blood Syndicate #1	1993	April 1993	Dwayne McDuffie; Ivan Velez Jr.	Denys Cowan; Jimmy Palmiotti	
Hardware	Curt Metcalf		Hardware #1	1993	April 1993	Dwayne McDuffie; Denys Cowan		
Holocaust / Pyre	Leonard Smalls Jr.	Blood Syndicate	Static #4	1993				
Icon	Augustus Freeman IV		Icon #1	1993	May 1993	Dwayne McDuffie; Denys Cowan		
Masquerade		Blood Syndicate	Blood Syndicate #1	1993	April 1993	Dwayne McDuffie; Ivan Velez Jr.	Denys Cowan; Jimmy Palmiotti	
Payback		Heroes						
Rocket	Raquel Ervin		Icon #1	1993	May 1993	Dwayne McDuffie; Denys Cowan		
Starlight	Stella Maxwell	Shadow Cabinet, The Heroes	Shadow Cabinet					
Static	Virgil Ovid Hawkins							
Tarmack	Charles Bell	Blood Syndicate	Static #2	1993				
Tech-9	Rolando Texador	Blood Syndicate	Blood Syndicate #1	1993	April 1993	Dwayne McDuffie; Ivan Velez Jr.	Denys Cowan; Jimmy Palmiotti	
Technique ^{[B]}								
Wise Son	Hannibal White	Blood Syndicate	Blood Syndicate #1	1993	April 1993	Dwayne McDuffie; Ivan Velez Jr.	Denys Cowan; Jimmy Palmiotti	

=== Monumental Comics ===
Name	Alter Ego(s)	Teams/Associations	First Appearance	Year	Date	Writer	Artist	Ref
Noble Star			Noble Star #1			Adrean Jones		
Glister The Diamond Girl ^{[A]}			Glister The Diamond Girl #1			Adrean Jones		
Soaring Eagle			Soaring Eagle Book #1			Adrean Jones		
Instant			Instant Book #1			Adrean Jones		

=== New Universe ===
Name	Alter Ego(s)	Teams/Associations	First Appearance	Year	Date	Writer	Artist	Ref
Blur	Jeff Walters	D.P.7	D.P.7 #1		November 1986	Mark Gruenwald	Paul Ryan	
Brick Wall	Beauford Wohl	Kickers, Inc.	Kickers, Inc. #1		November 1986	Tom DeFalco	Ron Frenz	
Dasher	Dallas Corbin	Kickers, Inc.	Kickers, Inc. #1		November 1986	Tom DeFalco	Ron Frenz	
Friction	Charlotte "Charly" Beck	D.P.7	D.P.7 #1		November 1986	Mark Gruenwald	Paul Ryan	
Mutator, Wild Thing ^{[A]}	George Mullaney	D.P.7, Para-Troop	D.P.7 #1 (possibly)		November 1986	Mark Gruenwald	Paul Ryan	
Think Tank	Theresa "Teddy" Roberts	Spitfire and the Troubleshooters	Spitfire and the Troubleshooters #1		October 1986	Eliot R. Brown, Gerry Conway & John Morelli	Herb Trimpe	
Voyager	Tyrone Jessup	Psi-Force	Psi-Force #1		November 1986	Steve Perry	Mark Texeira	

=== Pacific Comics ===
Name	Alter Ego(s)	Teams/Associations	First Appearance	Year	Date	Writer	Artist	Ref
Urth		Earth 4	Powerman #1					

=== Pikin Press ===
Name	Alter Ego(s)	Teams/Associations	First Appearance	Year	Date	Writer	Artist	Ref
Powerman			Powerman #1		1975	Don Avenall, Norman Worker	Dave Gibbons	

=== Supreme Power ===
Name	Alter Ego(s)	Teams/Associations	First Appearance	Year	Date	Writer	Artist	Ref
Blue Eagle								
Blur	Stanley Stewart	Squadron Supreme	Supreme Power #5	2004				
Nighthawk		Squadron Supreme	Supreme Power #2	2004				

=== Ultimate Marvel ===
Name	Alter Ego(s)	Teams/Associations	First Appearance	Year	Date	Writer	Artist	Ref
Falcon	Sam Wilson							
Luke Cage		Ultimate Defenders						
Misty Knight								
Nick Fury								
Spider-Man	Miles Morales					Brian Michael Bendis		
Vision	Robert Mitchell		Ultimate Comics: Ultimates #22			Sam Humphries	Joe Bennett	

=== Urban Legend ===
Name	Alter Ego(s)	Teams/Associations	First Appearance	Year	Date	Writer	Artist	Ref
The Urban Legend	Malcom T. Madiba			2012		Josef Yohannes	NewTasty	

=== Valiant Comics ===
Name	Alter Ego(s)	Teams/Associations	First Appearance	Year	Date	Writer	Artist	Ref
Quantum	Eric Percy Henderson	Quantum and Woody			1997	Christopher Priest	M. D. Bright	
Livewire	Amanda Mckee	Unity, Secret Weapons	Harbinger #15	1993	March 1993	Bob Layton	Joe St. Pierre	
Shadowman	Jack Boniface	Secret Weapons	X-O Manowar #4	1992	May 1992	Jim Shooter, Steve Englehart	David Lapham	

=== Vertigo Comics ===
Name	Alter Ego(s)	Teams/Associations	First Appearance	Year	Date	Writer	Artist	Ref
Agent 355			Y: The Last Man					
Boy	Lucille Butler	The Invisibles		1994				
Chullo ^{[A]}	Charles Henry	The Judges						
Dhalua Strong			Tom Strong #1	1999		Alan Moore, Chris Sprouse		
Strel			100% #1	2002		Paul Pope		
Ziona			2020 Visions #10: Repro-Man	1998		Jamie Delano		

=== Wildstorm (ABC/Homage) ===
Name	Alter Ego(s)	Teams/Associations	First Appearance	Year	Date	Writer	Artist	Ref
Ambrose Chase			Planetary					
Anansi			Astro City					
Battalion	Jackson King							
Black Badge			Astro City					
Black Rapier		the Honor Guard	Astro City					
Blue Knight			Astro City					
Cleopatra		the Honor Guard	Astro City					
Dhalua Strong ^{[A]}								
Flint	Victoria Ngengi	Stormwatch, associate of The Authority						
Hoodoo Priest	Parsifal Congo		Top 10					
Jack-in-the-Box	Zachary Johnson		Astro City					
King Peacock	John Corbeau		Top 10					
Micro-Maid	Doctor Sally-Jo Jessell		Top 10					
MPH		the Honor Guard	Astro City					
New American			The American Way #1					
Promethea	Sophie Bangs		ABC Comics					
Rite		the Changers	Stormwatch					
Stochastic Fats	Willie Beaumont	Top 10						
Strafe	Malcolm King							
Synaesthesia	Wanda Jackson	Top 10						
Tesla Strong ^{[B]}								
Augustus Cole	Cole Train		Gears of War			Ortega	Sharp	
Voodoo	Priscilla Kitaen	WildC.A.T.S.	WildC.A.T.S. #1	1992		Brandon Choi	Jim Lee	

=== ZOOLOOK ===
Name	Alter Ego(s)	Teams/Associations	First Appearance	Year	Date	Writer	Artist	Ref
Dread & Alive	Drew McIntosh		Concrete Jungle #1	2010	February 2010	Nicholas Da Silva	Rodney Buchemi	
HITLESS	Agent HITLESS		Ambush #1	2007		Nicholas Da Silva	Rodney Buchemi	

== Other media ==
=== Newspapers ===
Name	Alter Ego(s)	Teams/Associations	First Appearance	Year	Date	Writer	Artist	Ref
Bungleton Green		The Mystic Commandos	Bungleton Green comic strip	1920			Leslie Rogers, Jay Jackson (later)	
Captain Soul				circa 1970			Jiam Desjardins	
Chisolm Kid								
Don Powers								
Ebony White			The Spirit comic strip	1940		Will Eisner	Will Eisner	
Guy Fortune								
Jive Gray								
Mark Hunt								
Mystic Commandos			Bungleton Green comic strip		1942	Jay Jackson	Jay Jackson	
Neil Knight								
Sergeant Joe								
Speed Jaxon								

=== Novels and anthologies ===
Name	Alter Ego(s)	Teams/Associations	First Appearance	Year	Date	Writer	Artist	Ref
Black Eagle (Wild Cards)	Earl Sanderson, Jr.							
Cassie of the Animorphs book series.								
Fortunato (Wild Cards)								
Harlem Hammer (Wild Cards)	Mordechai Albert Jones	Ace						
Knight Seeker	Nygel Spinner					Eric Cooper		
Hiro Protagonist (Snow Crash)								
Max Madigan	Max Madigan		The Serpent Cult			Howard Night		

=== Webcomics ===
Name	Alter Ego(s)	Teams/Associations	First Appearance	Year	Date	Writer	Artist	Ref
Anubysse	Kevin Bright	Evil Shenanigans	Pre-BC		2007			
Black Puma		Justice Squad	Slightly Warped					
Chocolate Thunder			Gettosake Entertainment					
Destiny			12 Comics					
Destruct-O-Tron	Todd Purvee	Super Haters	Super Haters #1		June 25, 2009	Nick Marino	Nick Marino	
Eleggua			Impcomics.com					
Fearless Grasshopper			Gettosake Entertainment					
Fierce			Gettosake Entertainment					
Harmony			12 Comics					
JetSpeed			12 Comics					
Nanoman			Gettosake Entertainment					
Neters								
Nightflyer		Justice Squad	Slightly Warped					
Sister Hoodoo	Aretha	Marvelous Detectives	Super Haters #391		June 19, 2012	Nick Marino, Justique Woolridge	Nick Marino	
Stealth								
Sunblayde			12 Comics					
The Urban Avenger			GlascoGraphix.com					
Venus Kincaid			Gettosake Entertainment					
Yo Mo'Fro, The Big Brother			FOG webcomics		2009	F.Jones	F.Jones	
Youngshot			12 Comics					
Zenon			12 Comics					

=== Television ===
Name	Alter Ego(s)	Teams/Associations	First Appearance	Year	Date	Writer	Artist	Ref
A-Train	Reginald Franklin	The Seven	The Boys					
Afro Samurai			Afro Samurai					
Apollo	Swinton Sawyer	TTAFFBH		1994				
Princess Aisha		Winx Club	The Shadow Phoenix	2005				
Anansi the Spider		Static (ally)	Static Shock					
Agent Antoine Triplett		S.H.I.E.L.D.	Agents of S.H.I.E.L.D.					
Benny Sherwood			Wizards vs Aliens					
Big Lob		G.I. Joe	G.I. Joe: The Movie					
Black Lightning	Franklin Pierce		Black Lightning					
Black Overdrive Ranger	Will Aston	Power Rangers Operation Overdrive		2007				
Black Ranger	Zack Taylor	Mighty Morphin Power Rangers		1993				
Black Vulcan		Super Friends	Super Friends	1978			Alex Togh	
Blade	Eric Brooks		Blade (TV show)					
Blue Dino Thunder Ranger	Ethan James	Power Rangers Dino Thunder		2004				
Blue Hyperforce Ranger	Eddie Banks	Power Rangers Hyperforce		2017				
Blue (Super) Megaforce Ranger	Noah Carver	Power Rangers Megaforce		2013				
Blue Samurai Ranger	Kevin	Power Rangers Samurai		2011				
Blue Wild Force Ranger	Max Cooper	Power Rangers Wild Force		2002				
The Brown Hornet			Fat Albert					
Bulletproof	Baldwin P. Vess	C.O.P.S.	C.O.P.S.					
Bumblebee		Teen Titans (East)	Teen Titans					
Capital G		Justice Friends	Dexter's Laboratory					
Cassie			Animorphs					
Curtis Holt		Team Arrow	Arrow					
Cyborg	Victor Stone	Teen Titans	Teen Titans episode #1					
Mike Peterson	Deathlok		Agents of S.H.I.E.L.D. episode #1					
Delilah			Gargoyles					
Detective Jesse Reese		Gotham City Police Department	Birds of Prey					
Diana			Dungeons and Dragons episode #1					
Dion Warren			Raising Dion					
Doc	Walter Hartford	Galaxy Rangers						
Doc	Carl W. Greer	G.I. Joe						
Doc Clayton	None	Fort Kerium	BraveStarr		1987			
Doc Saturday	None		Secret Saturdays					
Dr. Elwin "El" Lincoln	None	Misfits of Science						
Elisa Maza			Gargoyles					
Elizabeth		Tomorrow People						
Falcon	Sam Wilson	Avengers						
Guardian	James Olsen		Supergirl					
Guardian	Kelly Olsen		Supergirl					
Commander Jonathan Ford		NAVY	SeaQuest DSV					
Lt. J.J. Fredricks		NAVY	SeaQuest DSV					
Green Hunter Beetleborg / Titanium Silver Beetleborg	Roland Williams	Beetleborgs	Big Bad Beetleborgs	1996				
Green Galaxy Ranger	Damon Henderson	Power Rangers Lost Galaxy		1999				
Green Lightspeed Ranger	Joel Rawlings	Power Rangers Lightspeed Rescue		2000				
Grid Battleforce Red Ranger	Devon Daniels	Power Rangers Beast Morphers		2019				
Hondo MacLean		M.A.S.K.						
Mystic Knight of Water	Ivan	Mystic Knights	Mystic Knights of Tir Na Nog	1998				
VR JB Reese	JB Reese	VR Troopers	VR Troopers	1994				
JD Bennett		Bionic Six	Bionic 6					
John Diggle	Spartan	Team Arrow	Arrow		2012			
Green Lantern	John Stewart	Justice League	Justice League					
Hammerman								
D. L. Hawkins			Heroes					
Heavy Duty	Lamont A. Morris	G.I. Joe						
Herald			Teen Titans					
Hotwing		Silverhawks	Silverhawks					
Jake Justice		Rescue Heroes						
Jonathan James Junior		Thunderbirds 2086						
Jett Jackson			The Famous Jett Jackson					
Juice			Justice League Unlimited					
Kamen Rider Camo	Grant Stanley, Van		Kamen Rider: Dragon Knight	2008				
Kenny		Tomorrow People						
Kiddy Phenil			Silent Möbius					
Kwame		Planeteers	Captain Planet					
Leo Dooley		Davenport Bionic Academy	Lab Rats (TV series)					
Lothar			Defenders of the Earth					
LJ (Lothar Junior)			Defenders of the Earth					
M.A.N.T.I.S.	Miles Hawkins	M.A.N.T.I.S.	M.A.N.T.I.S.	1994		Sam Raimi and Sam Hamm	Carl Lumbly	
Max Jones		Zone Riders	Spiral Zone					
Micro Woman	Christy Cross	Tarzan and the Super 7						
Micron			Batman Beyond					
Mister T			Mister T					
Misty Magic			Kid Superpower Hour with Shazam!					
Mjnari		X-Men (ally)	X-Men					
Moleculad		Hanna-Barbera's Teen Force	Space Stars					
Astrea		Space Sentinels		1977				
Morgan	Rockne Tarkington		Danger Island					
Naomi McDuffie			Naomi					
Numbuh Five	Abigail "Abby" Lincoln	Kids Next Door	Codename: Kids Next Door					
Owen Renyolds		Supah Ninjas						
Pink Dino Charge Ranger	Shelby Watkins	Power Rangers Dino Charge		2015				
Power Man	Luke Cage		Ultimate Spider-Man					
Ranger Operator Series Red	Scott Truman	Power Rangers RPM		2009				
SPD Red Ranger (B-Squad)	Jack Landers	Power Rangers S.P.D.		2005				
Red Turbo Ranger	TJ Johnson	Power Rangers Turbo		1997				
Rena Rouge	Alya Césaire	French Miraculous Superhero Team	Sapotis		2018			
Cosmo, Splashdown, Sunstroke, Venus		Rickety Rocket Crew						
Roadblock	Marvin Hinton	G.I. Joe						
Richmond "Rocky" Canyon		Rescue Heroes						
Rubberband Man	Adam Evans	Static (ally)	Static Shock					
Samantha		Monster Buster Club	Monster Buster Club (MBC)					
Micah Sanders			Heroes episode #1					
Scout	Sgt. Robert Baker	Captain Power and the Soldiers of the Future						
She-Bang	Shenice Vale	Static (ally)	Static Shock					
Silver Sentry		Teenage Mutant Ninja Turtles			2003			
Solomon "Doc" Saturday		Saturday Family	The Secret Saturdays					
Soul Power	Morris Grant	Static (ally)						
Sparky	Phillip Rollins	Static (ally)						
Spyke	Evan Daniels	X-Men	X-Men: Evolution					
Stalker	Lonzo Wilkenson	G.I. Joe						
Stalker		Batman (occasional ally)						
Starfire	Princess Koriand'r / Kory Anders / Starfire	Titans						
Static	Virgil Hawkins	(partnership) Gear	Static Shock episode #1					
Super Stretch	Chris Cross	Tarzan and the Super 7						
Talon	Derek Maza		Gargoyles					
Teal'c	Jaffa		Stargate SG-1					
The Super Globetrotters								
Thunder	Anissa Pierce		Black Lightning					
Tupperware	Token Black	Coon and Friends	South Park					
Turbo	Edward Hayes	Rambo and the Forces of Freedom						
Warhawk	Rex Stewart	Justice League Unlimited						
White Ninja Steel Ranger	Hayley Foster	Power Rangers Ninja Steel		2017				
Winston Zeddmore		The Real Ghostbusters						
Yellow Ranger	Aisha Campbell	Mighty Morphin Power Rangers		1994				
Yellow Time Force Ranger	Katie Walker	Power Rangers Time Force		2001				
Yellow Wild West Ranger	Miss Alicia	Wild West Rangers from Mighty Morphin Power Rangers		1994				
Zeo Ranger Yellow / Yellow Turbo Ranger	Tanya Sloan	Power Rangers Zeo / Power Rangers Turbo		1996				
Zak Saturday	None		Secret Saturdays					

=== Film ===
Name	Alter Ego(s)	Teams/Associations	First Appearance	Year	Date	Writer	Artist	Ref
Ayo		Dora Milaje	Captain America: Civil War	2016				
Bishop	Lucas Bishop	X-Men	X-Men: Days of Future Past	2014				
Black Panther	T'Challa	Avengers	Captain America: Civil War	2016				
Blade	Eric Brooks ^{[A]} / Daywalker	Nightstalkers (ally)	Blade	1998				
Blankman	Darryl Walker	Blankman and Other Guy	Blankman	1994				
Blue Ranger (2017, film)	Billy Cranston	Power Rangers	Power Rangers	2017				
Catwoman	Patience Phillips		Catwoman	2004				
Cobra Bubbles		CIA	Lilo & Stitch	2002				
Darwin	Armando Muñoz		X-Men: First Class	2011				
Falcon	Sam Wilson	Avengers	Captain America: The Winter Soldier	2014				
Frozone	Lucius Best	The Incredibles (ally)	The Incredibles	2004				
Hancock	John Hancock		Hancock	2008				
Heimdall		Revengers	Thor	2011				
Heavy Duty	Lamont A. Morris	G.I.Joe	G.I. Joe: The Rise of Cobra	2009				
Human Torch	Johnny Storm	Fantastic Four	Fantastic Four	2015				
The Golden Blaze	Gregory Fletcher		The Golden Blaze	2005		Archie Gips		
Kestrel	John Wraith	Weapon X	X-Men Origins: Wolverine	2009				
Kiddy Phenil		AMP	Silent Möbius	1992				
The Invisible Boy			Mystery Men	1999				
Jax	Major Jackson Briggs		Mortal Kombat	1993				
Meteor Man	Jefferson Reed		The Meteor Man	1993				
Monica Rambeau			Captain Marvel	2019				
Nakia			Black Panther	2018				
Nick Fury	Col. Nicolas Fury	Avengers	Iron Man	2008				
Okoye		Avengers and Dora Milaje	Black Panther	2018				
Other Guy	Kevin Walker	Blank Man	Blankman	1994				
Penny Lent			Sky High	2005				
Popsicle	Ethan		Sky High	2005				
Ramonda	Queen Ramonda		Black Panther	2018				
Roadblock	Marvin F. Hinton	G.I. Joe	G.I. Joe: Retaliation	2013				
Shuri	Princess Shuri	Avengers	Black Panther	2018				
Spawn	Albert "Al" Simmons		Spawn	1997				
Spider-Man	Miles Morales		Spider-Man: Into the Spider-Verse	2018				
Steel	John Henry Irons		Steel	1997				
Storm	Ororo Munroe	X-Men	X-Men	1999				
Valkyrie		Avengers, (partnerships) Thor	Thor: Ragnarok	2017				
War Machine/Iron Patriot	James "Rhodey" Rhodes	Avengers	Iron Man 2	2010				
Wasabi		Big Hero 6	Big Hero 6	2014				
Yellow Ranger (Movie, 1995)	Aisha Campbell	Mighty Morphin Power Rangers	Mighty Morphin Power Rangers: The Movie	1995				

== Notes ==
=== Dark Horse Comics ===
A. Plexus was an ally of Nexus from Nexus: Executioner's Song #3

=== DC Comics ===
A. Cal Durham was Aquaman's ally who was modified by Black Manta to possess physiology similar to that of an Atlantean.
A1 Amber was an ally of Jericho trained by Adeline Kane and an operative of Searcher's Inc.
B. Chunk was a Flash ally
C. Conjura used backwards magic like Zatanna.
D. Crystallex becomes a living crystal and morphs. In stasis at S.T.A.R. Labs San Francisco.
E. Centaur was the protector of the Realm from the Wizardworld series in Warlord
F. FerAlyse was a feral denizen of Chicago's Netherworld
G. Glenn Gammeron is an intergalactic bounty hunter from Mi'ran and an ally of the Martian Manhunter
H. Gus Gray was a replacement loader for The Haunted Tank.
I. Healer Randolph was one of Tomahawk's Rangers, an ex-slave turned folk healer
J. Jackie Johnson was an ex-heavyweight boxing champion, and an amalgamation of Jackie Robinson and Joe Louis. He was a member of Sgt. Rock's Easy Company.
K. Jim Corrigan was an African-American police officer and an ally of Jimmy Olsen and Black Lightning
L. Jody was an ally of Tomahawk.
M. Machiste was a sometimes ally of the Warlord
N. Martin Ellis woke from coma in Justice League Quarterly #17 with powers of Tempest
O. Mister Bones is the director of the Department of Extranormal Operations.
P. Mohammed Ibn Bornu was a North African warrior hero.
Q. Molo represented Africa.
R. Nubia was a Wonder Woman ally
S. Percival Hazard was the leader of Squad K and grandson of Ulysses Hazard. He was last seen in Action Comics Annual #13 2008.
T. Philippus was an Amazon ally of Wonder Woman.
U. Seraph was a US government agent.
V. Scrap had magnetic powers
W. Sela was an Atlantean warrior woman 3,000 years ago
W1. Shondra Kinsolving was a doctor with telekinetic healing abilities and an ally of Batman.
X. Sojourner was a member of Artemis' HellEnders.
Y. The Solution was a Teen Titans tryout.
Z. Sonik (Superman/Batman ally from World's Finest)
A1. Ted & Terri Trapper were private detectives
A2. Tina Ames had the power of "Bio-Energy" and could become living energy.
A3. Wilson Forbes was a Daily Planet reporter.
A4. Wyldeheart was an ally of Damage
A5. Zeke had super strength.

=== Dell Comics ===
A. Lobo, two issue run

=== Dorkstorm Notes ===
A. Dr. Blink Superhero Shrink

=== Eclipse Comics Notes ===
A. Polestar was the acrobatic female member of the New Wave
B. Roboto (cyborg member of Team Youngblood from The DNAgents universe)
C. Sabre was one of the first graphic novels.
D. Strike inherited the power harness from Sgt. Strike

=== The Guardian Line Comics Notes ===
A. Code was a Spirit styled vigilante

=== Image Comics Notes ===
A. American Pi was a supersmart heroine

=== Marvel Comics ===
A. The Black Musketeers were allies of the Black Panther
B. Wes Cassady is a construction publisherer who was bitten by a radioactive rabbit.

=== Marvel Comics UK ===
A. Afrikaa was a superhuman ally of Black Panther
B. Doctor Crocodile was an ally of Captain Britain

=== MC2 Notes ===
A. Fred was Stark's bodyguard (Jim Rhodes)

=== Milestone Media ===
A. D-Struct was an ally of Hardware.
B. Technique was a female version of Hardware.
C. Buck Wild was a parody of Luke Cage.

=== New Universe Comics ===
A. Mutator was revealed as African American in the final issue.

=== Vertigo Comics Notes ===
A. Chullo was an ex-cop and empowered by The Nazz.

=== Wildstorm Comics ===
A. Dhalua Strong was the wife of Tom Strong.
B. Tesla Strong was the daughter of Tom Strong.

=== Movies ===
A. Character was never fully mentioned by this name in the film.

== See also ==
- List of black animated characters
- African characters in comics
- Ethnic stereotypes in comics
- List of Asian superheroes
- List of Latino superheroes
- List of black video game characters
- List of Native American superheroes
