= Jeremy Dale =

Jeremy Dale may refer to:

- Jeremy Dale (comics) (1979–2014), American comic book artist
- Jeremy Dale (racing driver) (born 1962), Canadian racing driver

== See also ==
- Jerry Dale (born 1933), American former professional baseball umpire
