= Abomination =

Abomination(s) may refer to:

== Religion ==
- Abomination (Bible), an English term used to translate some Biblical Hebrew terms
- Abomination (Judaism), an offense against the religious senses of a people

== Arts and entertainment ==
- Abomination (character), a Marvel Comics supervillain
- Abomination (Dune), a plot device in the Dune series
- Abomination: The Nemesis Project, a 1999 video game
- Abomination, a 1998 novel by Robert Swindells
- Abominations (comic book), a Marvel Comics limited series
- Abominations (album), 2007, by Schoolyard Heroes
- "Abominations" (Legends of Tomorrow), an episode of the TV series Legends of Tomorrow

== See also ==
- Abominable (disambiguation)
- Abominationz, a 2012 album by Twiztid
