= Jeremy Dale (comics) =

American comic book artist

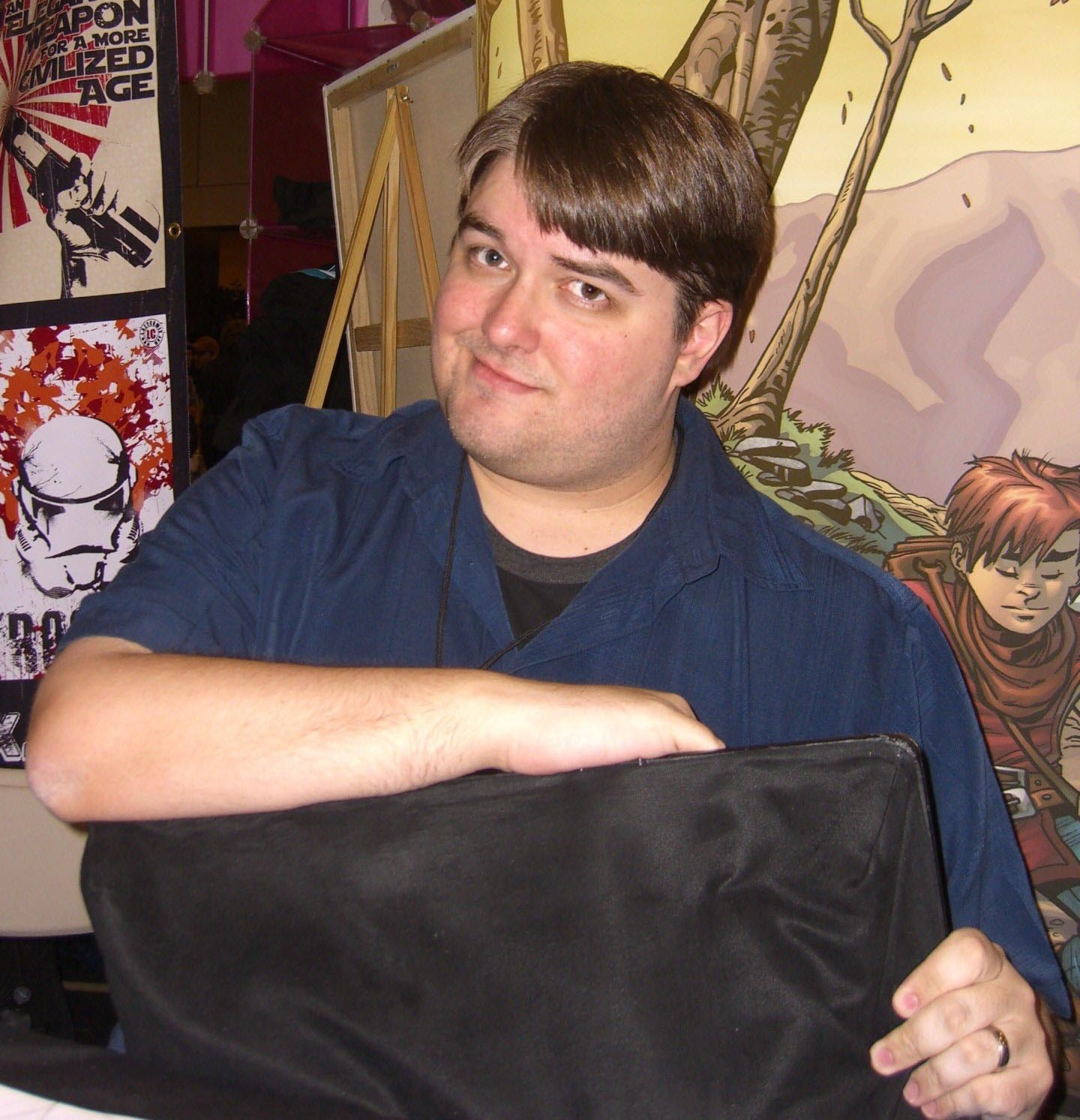
- Dale at the New York Comic Con in Manhattan, October 10, 2010.
- Born: Jeremy Heath Dale; November 22, 1979 Muncie, Indiana, U.S.
- Died: November 3, 2014 (aged 34) Atlanta, Georgia, U.S.
- Areas: Penciller, Inker
- Notable works: G.I. Joe: A Real American Hero

Jeremy Dale (November 22, 1979 – November 3, 2014) was an American comic book artist, best known for his work on G.I. Joe: A Real American Hero, Popgun Volume 1 from Image Comics, which won the 2008 Harvey Award for Best Anthology.

== Early life ==
Jeremy Dale was born on November 22, 1979. While a student at Kokomo High School, he published his own Thin Cage comics and sold them to classmates for a dollar during lunch breaks. He graduated in 1998, and attended Olivet Nazarene University, where he created strips for the school newspaper.

== Career ==
Dale's first published work was the 2003 comic book series Trust, which he wrote and illustrated. The story revolved around a young man's quest to understand the mysteries behind his parents’ past.

While developing Absolute Zeroes, involving super-powered siblings Hunter and Chase stumbling into the protection of the city. In 2005, he was asked to illustrate a back-up story in Image Comics' Wildguard: Fool’s Gold #1 featuring the character American Icon.

Dale continued working on Absolute Zeroes while completing various back-up stories, pinups, and full issues for various books such as Space Doubles and City of Heroes. He also contributed to the Awesome Storm Justice 41 webcomic spinoff, Saiko, in 2006, and to the anthology Popgun: Volume 1, which won the 2008 Harvey Award for Best Anthology.

In 2007, Dale was brought on as illustrator of the G.I. Joe: A Real American Hero 25th Anniversary comics written by series creator Larry Hama for Hasbro. The comics were included with the two-character comic packs released starting in 2008.

In 2011, Dale began publishing Skyward through Action Lab Entertainment, which gained recognition in the comic book world. The comic was published regularly until his death in 2014. He began a successful partnership with Action Lab, creating comics such as NFL Rush Zone, which was also distributed at the 2013 Super Bowl and for Free Comic Book Day in 2013.

== Personal life ==
Jeremy Dale and his wife and collaborator, Kelly Dale, lived in Atlanta, Georgia. In the evening of November 3, 2014, Dale died suddenly at the age of 34, having previously been hospitalized. Friends and colleagues who publicly paid tribute to Dale included Cully Hamner and Joe Eisma. A GoFundMe page was started by Stephanie Cooke to assist Kelly Dale with future expenses.

== Bibliography ==
- Trust #1–6 (2003–2004)
- Absolute Zeroes #1–3 (2005–2006)
- Eclipse & Vega: The Beds We Make #2 (2005)
- Wildguard: Fool’s Gold #1 (Image Comics, 2005)
- City of Heroes #5 (Devil's Due Publishing, 2005)
- Storytellers: A 24 Hour Tale (2005)
- Comics JamWar (2006)
- BIZMAR Anthology (2006)
- Saiko #2 (2006)
- Heroforge Ink Sketchbook (2007)
- My Favorite Characters (2007)
- HOPE: New Orleans (2007)
- Popgun v. 1 (Image Comics, 2007)
- Space Doubles #1 (Th3rd World Studios, 2007)
- Sniper and Rook Sketchbook (2007)
- G.I. Joe: A Real American Hero (Devil's Due Publishing, 2008)
- Miserable Dastards #1–4 (2008)
- Skyward #1–9 (2011–2014)
