= Abominable =

Abominable may refer to:

- Abominable (2006 film), an American monster film by Ryan Schifrin
- Abominable (2019 film), an animated adventure film

== See also ==
- Abomination (disambiguation)
