= The Urban Legend (comics) =

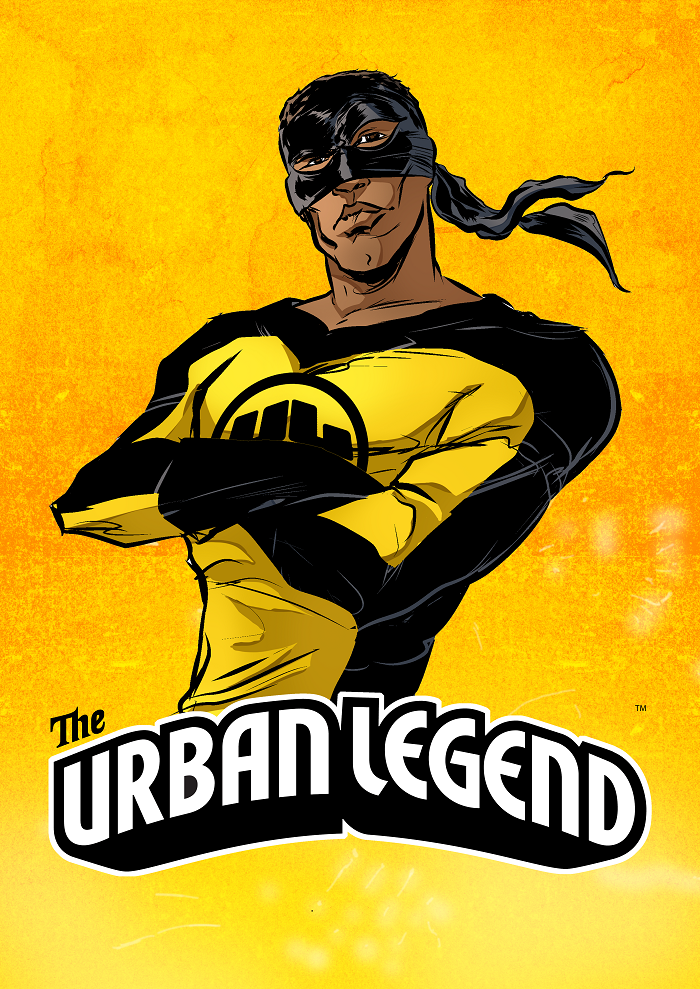

Publication information
- Publisher: Gyldendal Forlag
- First appearance: January, 2012
- First comic appearance: "The Birth of a True Superhero"
- Created by: Josef Tzegai Yohannes

In-story information
- Alter ego: Malcolm Tzegai Madiba
- Abilities: Extraordinary strength, speed and agility; Genius-level intellect; Master martial artist and hand-to-hand combatant; Peak human physical and mental conditioning; Expert tactician and strategist

The Urban Legend is an ongoing Eritrean/Norwegian comic book series created by Josef Tzegai Yohannes and Steve Baker.

"The Urban Legend" refers to Malcolm Tzegai Madiba, an Eritrean-Norwegian 29-year-old high school teacher in the fictional city of Capital City (also known as the City of God). After the murder of his cousin Justin, Malcolm adopts the alter-ego of The Urban Legend, a crime-fighting superhero committed to justice and protecting the innocent.

== Publication history ==
=== Series background ===
The Urban Legend was created by Josef Tzegai Yohannes, a comic book creator of Eritrean heritage. Yohannes was inspired to create the series after taking a trip to South Africa for the 2010 FIFA World Cup. While in Africa, he saw poor children playing and was motivated to create a hero for children of African descent all over the world to look up to. Yohannes named the character Malcolm Tzegai Madiba, after his father Tzegai, and the human rights activists Malcolm X and Madiba (better known as Nelson Mandela).

=== Publication and debut at Comic Con ===
The series debuted in Norway in January 2012, with "The Birth of a True Superhero". The series had its international debut at San Diego Comic-Con in July 2012.

In 2013, the first eight issues of The Urban Legend season 1 were released through Gyldendals Forlag. Gyldendals Forlag published A Real Superhero in the Making, a hardcover compilation of season 1, which was released in October 2014. Norwegian publisher Bestselgerforlaget took over as publisher of the series in 2015, and published the six-issue run of season 2 as well as the season 2 compilation book, No Way Back.

The Urban Legend collaborated with Malala Fund and 20th Century Fox for the release of the 2015 documentary movie He Named Me Malala. Malala was featured in a one-page comic strip with The Urban Legend, which was released with the movie and is part of school curriculum select schools in Norway, Brazil, South Africa, Kenya and Eritrea.

The Urban Legend also appeared in USA Today throughout 2013 and 2014 as part of a limited digital publishing deal.

Season 3 is said to be published by Cappelen Damm, the largest publishing house in Norway. The third season is eight issues long, and is expected to be released in March 2020. In addition to the regular series, The Urban Legend also releases special edition issues, including issues about education, ebola, and bullying.

== Synopsis ==
=== Season 1 ===
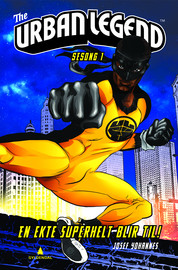
Cover of Season #1 (compilation book)

When Malcolm's friend, a local business owner, is robbed and assaulted, Malcolm is troubled that the assailant has not been arrested or charged. That night, the assailant, Young Evil, discusses a money laundering plan with nightclub owner Sugar Bear. They are interrupted by Justin, one of Sugar Bear's employees. Worried that Justin knows too much, Young Evil and his gang of thugs kill him in an alley near the club later that night. The next day, Malcolm learns that Justin – his cousin – has been murdered. Overcome with grief and burning with a desire for revenge, Malcolm swears that the criminals will pay.

Shortly after, a young female newspaper journalist who's been covering the crimes is cornered by Young Evil and his gang on the street. Before he can assault her, Malcolm, as the Urban Legend in a yellow and black costume, jumps in to fight Young Evil and his thugs using martial arts. When police sirens are heard, the injured criminals run off, leaving the journalist unhurt and alone as Malcolm slips away, covering his suit with a long coat. Subsequently, a bounty is put on Malcolm's head, leading to the kidnapping of his friend Matin. After besting Young Evil in a showdown and saving Matin, a young reporter named Sarah Parks makes Malcolm into a hero of the people. In revenge, Young Evil lures him to a showdown with the monster Manchild, who nearly kills him. After recovering in the care of his friend Mr. Fong, he faces Manchild again.

When Fong is captured, Malcolm travels to China, then Japan, to rescue him. After a successful showdown with the Seven Deadly Assassins, Malcolm returns to Capital City. After Malcolm's return, he is homeless and has lost his job as a teacher because he has been away from work too long. The city is in worse turmoil than ever.

A female villain by the name La Madrina ("Godmother" in Spanish) has her eye on ruling the criminal underworld, so is killing powerful men in the criminal underworld by seducing them. She also gets Malcolm's job as a teacher by flirting with the school principal Mannerheim. On Malcolm's first day back at school, there is an explosion. Shortly after, the Mayor is assassinated while giving a speech assuring the people that everything is under control, leading to riots in the streets of Capital City. It's all a conspiracy led by crooked cops and the Nationalist Citizen Council to trap TUL and get rid of him once and for all.

=== Season 2 ===
After being set up by the crime bosses, Malcolm is sent to Bush Penitentiary as riots fill Capital City and Sarah Parks is kidnapped. After his escape from the penitentiary, Malcolm faces new enemies, La Madrina and “The Myth.” Thinking Malcolm is dead after he fell for their trap, The Suburban Myth goes on a rampage. Malcolm goes to Norway with his new girlfriend, Lise, where he gets pulled into a war between the police and the gang B-Gjengen. When Malcolm is framed for murder, Oslo goes into full mayhem. The city is saved by The Urban Legend, but not before Lise is killed. A grieving Malcolm escapes to a rural village, where he finds that he is connected to the town's mysterious folklore. The Suburban Myth and La Madrina think they have killed The Urban Legend after they set him up in a trap. La Madrina leaves town believing her job is done, but he isn't dead. The Suburban Myth goes on a rampage and The Urban Legend must use everything in his power to stop him.

=== Season 3 ===
The Urban Legend has received mythical status. Stories of his heroism are reported all over the world, although not all are true. Malcolm returns to his teaching job hoping finally to return to peace and quiet. Soon he is confronted by a new gang that has moved into Capital City. Notably, this gang speaks Eritrean, the language of Malcolm's home country. Malcolm begins to investigate the gang and realizes they may hold the key to important information about his own past. As The Urban Legend, he tracks down the gang and confronts them about why they've appeared in Capital City and what they want from him. What they reveal only leaves Malcolm with more questions and he becomes determined to seek out the answers wherever they lead him.

In his classroom, Malcolm must deal with bullying among his students. After an incident at school, one of his students, a son of a gangster, attempts a school shooting, Malcolm must stop the violence as The Urban Legend. Problems with the Eritrean gang don't let up and lead to a new confrontation. Meanwhile, Detective Fletcher is released from prison and tries to kill The Urban Legend, but winds up killing a copycat instead. Malcolm witnesses this murder and seeks to enact vengeance for the fallen.

Detective Fletcher goes to Malcolm’s room to attempt any attack, but is scared off by a strange woman waiting at the door. The woman's name is Eden, an old friend of Malcolm’s from Eritrea. As youth, they trained to fight together. When Malcolm returns they reunite and reminisce about their shared past. They also discuss Malcolm’s father’s disappearance and how they protected the village from gangs until Malcolm went after a warlord. They still have deep feelings for each other and when Eden is kidnapped by La Madrina, Malcolm believes she has been lost for good. Despite his devastation Malcolm cannot shirk his duties as a superhero and protector of the city. However, Malcolm is given reason to believe not all is as it seems with Eden and her disappearance and it is not long before Malcolm has another violent confrontation with the forces of evil.

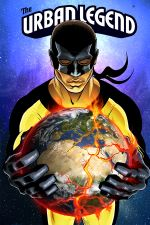
The Urban Legend Climate Change Cover. Art by NewTasty (Steve Baker).

== Special issues ==
The Urban Legend has released several special focused editions of the comic that deal with major problems facing the planet and global youth. These special editions are often done in conjunction with non-profits and educational organizations. Previous partners have been the Mandela Family Foundation, the Malala Foundation, and the World Wildlife Fund.

Mandela Edition, February 2014

A little kid named Biko has turned homeless after losing his parents to HIV/Aids. Malcolm is in Africa to work as a volunteer at an orphanage home, when he suddenly spots Biko and hears his story. Malcolm is deeply touched by Biko's story and takes him to the orphanage home. The orphanage home has had a lot of threats from an evil businessman who wants to remove the orphanage so he can build luxury apartments for the rich. Malcolm turns into The Urban Legend and confronts the evil businessman and teaches him a lesson he won't forget.

Ebola Edition, June 2015

Memuna and Augustine has lost their parents to Ebola and now the village they live in has banished them from living there. Homeless and with nowhere to go, The Urban Legend takes Memuna and Augustine to an orphanage home where they can live and have a home. The other kids at the orphanage teases Memuna and Augustine because their parents died of Ebola, so The Urban Legend decides to teach the kids what Ebola really is, how they can protect themselves against it and how they can fight it.

Eidsvoll Edition, February 2016

Malcolm is taking his school class to the Eidsvoll 1814 museum as part of history class, to teach the kids how Norway got their own constitution in 1814. On that same day the real constitution is being exhibited and an international crime organization are there dressed up as the police and ready to steal the constitution and The Urban Legend must use all his force to stop the crime gang from stealing the constitution.

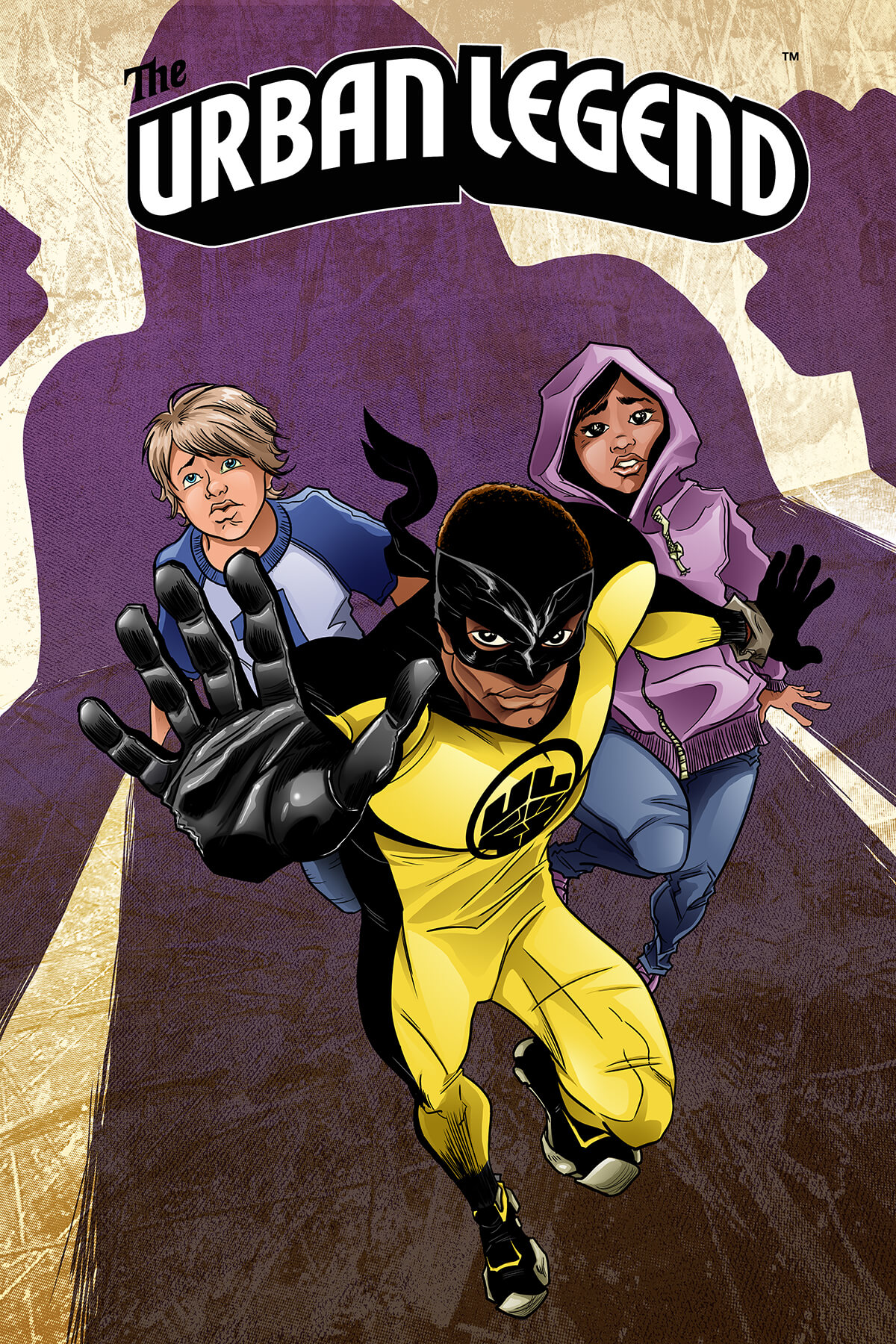
The Urban Legend Anti Bully Edition Cover. Art by NewTasty (Steve Baker).

Anti-Bullying, February 2017

Daniella has changed schools 3 times the last 2 years because of bullying. She has now started a new school and she is optimist that everything will better from now on, but the bullying is actually a lot worse than she has ever experienced. Leon is a jovial kid who loves music and football, but he struggles to make new friends because he is always made fun of in class by the school bully Mike. Daniella and Leon meets each other by fate and they see they have a lot in common and decide to band together and stand up against bullying with the help of The Urban Legend.

Climate Change, January 2020

Malcolm brings his class to a local conference happening on climate change. Together, they learn about the threats facing the natural environment, wild animals, and even human civilization from a rapidly shifting climate. At the conference they discuss the politics surrounding climate change and how reporting on climate issues can be a dangerous profession for environmentalists. Indigenous communities are also discussed as they are among the human cultures most affected by a warming planet. On his way home, Malcolm is contacted by his friend Matin, an activist, who is currently in the Brazilian rainforest. Matin has run into trouble with a local gang that has also been terrorizing a local tribe and destroying their ancestral lands. As The Urban Legend, Malcolm befriends the tribespeople and together they rescue Matin and run the gang off from their home. The Urban Legend's time with the indigenous community inspires him to take action against climate change once he returns home.

== Legacy ==
The initial run of the premiere issue of The Urban Legend, “The Birth of a True Superhero,” sold out in Norway. In June 2015, The Urban Legend did a collaboration with the Nobel Peace Center for their 10 year anniversary. In 2014, the Nelson Mandela Foundation named Josef Tzegai Yohannes as a "Mandela Ambassador" for Norway, in recognition of his work on The Urban Legend.

As part of the Norwegian premiere of Black Panther, Josef Yohannes presented on The Urban Legend at the US embassy in Norway in February 2018.

== Reception ==
=== Awards ===
2018 - "Best Entrepreneurial Artist" award at the Nordic Startup Awards 2018.

2018 - "“The Outstanding Young Person" from JCI Norway.
