= Thunderiders =

Fictional comic book group

Publication information
- Publisher: Marvel Comics
- First appearance: Captain America #269 (May 1982) (as Team America); Thing #27 (as Thunderiders)

In-story information
- Member(s): Cowboy; Georgianna Castleberry; Honcho; R. U. Reddy; Wolf; Wrench

Thunderiders is a fictional superhero/motorcycle team appearing in American comic books published by Marvel Comics. The characters were originally known as Team America, a property and toy line Marvel licensed from Ideal Toy Company. Team America first appeared in Captain America #269 (May 1982). They were renamed the Thunderiders in Thing #27.

== Publication history ==
Captain America writer J. M. DeMatteis described Team America as "another one we kind of got forced into doing." The month following their May 1982 preview appearance in Captain America, the team's monthly self-titled series launched. It was canceled with Team America #12 (May 1983).

== Fictional biography ==
=== Origin ===
The mothers of Honcho/James McDonald, Wolf, R. U. Reddy/Winthrop Roan Jr., Wrench/Leonard Hebb and Cowboy/Luke Merriweather were exposed to mutagenic agents by the terrorist organization Hydra as part of an experiment known as Project: New Genesis. Hydra hoped to create mutant children who could later be trained as super-agents. The project was apparently unsuccessful for all test subjects other than these five.

=== Early days/the Marauder ===
Honcho, Wolf, and Reddy initially meet at the first "Unlimited Class Racing" event in Daytona Beach, Florida. Unknown to them, they had first manifested their collective self, a masked motorcyclist dressed in black and known as the Marauder and the Dark Rider, a few days earlier. The Marauder invaded a Hydra facility and destroyed the files on the five. Deducing the subjects of the missing files, Hydra intends to assassinate Honcho, Wolf, and Reddy in the belief that one of them is the Marauder. Each of them escape the assassination attempt and, having each received a note from the Marauder stating their destinies were linked, decide to band together as Team America. They enter and win their first competition. Moments later, they foil an attempt by Hydra to steal an advanced guidance system from another team.

The three next fight alongside Captain America to defeat a plan by the Mad Thinker to kidnap a number of world-renowned intellectuals to provide him with stimulating companionship.

The original three teammates meet Wrench and Cowboy at an Unlimited Class Racing event in the Rocky Mountains. Recognizing the rapport they share, the original three members invite the other two to join the team, to which they agree.

=== Disbandment and return as Thunderiders ===
The team temporarily disbands, but yet another attack draws them out of retirement. While performing at a charity exhibition, Cowboy, Wolf and Reddy intervene in an attack on the New Mutants by Viper and the Silver Samurai. The three unconsciously manifest the Dark Rider persona onto Danielle Moonstar, the New Mutant known as Psyche. Psyche is captured and Viper attempts to force Team America to steal for her. Before they can formulate a plan of action, Professor Charles Xavier and the rest of the New Mutants join with them to rescue Psyche. It is then that the five learn they are mutants and possess the ability to project the Dark Rider persona. They train with Xavier for several weeks until they have complete conscious control over the manifestation and the recipient. Following this adventure, the five decide to remain a team, rebranding themselves as the Thunderiders.

== Powers and abilities ==
The five original members of the Thunderiders are mutants. They have no powers which function individually, but collectively have the power to project their strength, skills and knowledge onto another party without diminishing their own skills in the process. The person, who retains no memory of having been the recipient, is transformed into a black-clad motorcyclist known as the Marauder. Initially, the Thunderiders had no conscious control either over the manifestation of the Marauder or the person upon whom it was manifested, which meant it generally appeared when the team, or people they valued, was in peril. Furthermore, the Marauder has additional abilities like being able to operate the motorcycle from a distance and use it to attack an opponent. Training under Professor Xavier gave them greater control. For instance, they learned how to voluntarily transform into the Marauder themselves and retain the memory of being in that form.

The Thunderiders are all expert motorcycle riders.

== Toy line ==
The Team America comic books were based on a toy line from Ideal Toy Company. The Team America toy line was an attempt by Ideal to replace their successful Evel Knievel toy line after Knievel served six months for battery in the late 1970s, and it used many of the same molds and designs.

The Ideal Toys' trademarks and toy molds were purchased by Jay Horowitz of American Plastic Equipment, who later transferred all rights to American Plastic Equipment's subsidiary, American Classic Toys. The Ideal Toys trademark, and most toy rights, were sold to Poof-Slinky.

In 2019, Jay Horowitz of American Classic Toys, and current rights holder, entered into an exclusive license agreement with The Juna Group to represent the Team America brand in all categories outside of toys and playthings, worldwide. In 2023, the Transogram exclusive license agreement was acquired from The Juna Group by CSN Press LLC., publishers of the weekly newspaper Comic Shop News.

== Membership ==
=== Original ===
- Cowboy (Luke Merriweather), equally adept at trick-riding on the rodeo as well as the motorcycle circuit.
- Honcho (James McDonald), a former agent in the CIA.
- R. U. Reddy (Winthrop Roan, Jr.), disinherited son of a millionaire industrialist, Reddy also has dreams of Rock 'n Roll-stardom.
- Wolf (real name unrevealed), nomadic biker with street-fighting skills.
- Wrench (Leonard Hebb), a mechanical genius who designs and repairs the team's vehicles.

=== Later members ===
- The Thing joins the team for a while, but quits before making any public appearances as a team member.
- Sharon Ventura is a Thunderiders member for several months prior to assuming the identity of Ms. Marvel.

=== Unofficial members ===
- Georgianna Castleberry, Wrench's girlfriend, and later wife, is an unofficial member of the team. She often serves as the host body for the Marauder persona, although she retains no memory of it.
