= The Craptacular B-Sides =

Marvel comic book series

Craptacular B-Sides
- Cover to Craptacular B-Sides #3

Publication information
- Publisher: Marvel Comics
- Schedule: Monthly
- Format: Limited series
- Main character(s): Fateball; Jughandle; Mize; Charley Huckle (organizer); Feeva

Creative team
- Written by: Brian David-Marshall
- Artist(s): ChrisCross, Brett Weidele
- Colorist: Matt Madden

The Craptacular B-Sides is a three-issue comic book limited series published by Marvel Comics in 2002. The series is set in Raven's Perch, New Jersey, a fictional town renowned in Marvel's main shared universe for having a far higher percentage of superhumans than any other small town in America.

The three members are disenfranchised youths with little direction in life until they are approached by a man named Charley Huckle. He proposes that they become "the hottest new superhero team since the New Warriors".

== Members ==
Jughandle
Jesse Metuchen is the son of the Raven's Perch mayor. He has the ability to step "sideways in time", creating a parallel time stream into which he and others can step. There they are invisible and cannot be touched by those outside, but they are still able to see the world around them.
Mize
Presumably Stuart Welles' code name is short for "demise". Mize can accelerate the decay of systems causing machinery to break down, materials to decay, cause injuries/weaknesses in humans and even destroy both relationships and the high school football team's winning streak. He has little or no control over his powers, and often inadvertently breaks things nearby.
Fateball
Laura Broadbahr is an excellent hand-to-hand combatant, who is also rather fond of fighting dirty. She possesses a "Magic Fateball" that seems to have no limit to the number of answers it can give (though the information is still limited to affirmative or negative) and is always correct.

== Synopsis ==
Jughandle, Fateball, Mize and Feeva are best friends who have just graduated from high school. However, Feeva lost the favor of her friends when she tricked them into a mission intended to gain her acceptance into the Pegasus Institute. The other three friends are left in Raven's Perch without direction. They receive mysterious invitations to meet at the local bowling alley, only to be surprised by Charley Huckle (a local con man).

Huckle explains he wants to organize them into a local superteam (in his own efforts to make desperately needed money). The friends agree and become the Craptacular B-Sides. After Huckle takes them to their new headquarters – a deserted warehouse – he gives them their first mission: capture Doctor Dark. He was Huckle's first foray into creating a superhero, but things didn't go well and now Doc Dark has a bounty on his head.

Locating Doctor Dark at the bowling alley, the B-Sides engage him. But Doc Dark turns out to be more than they bargained for, and the B-Sides are in over their heads. The Fantastic Four arrive just in time to stop Doc Dark and save the B-Sides. Huckle argues with the Fantastic Four to get the bounty on Doc Dark paid to himself and the B-Sides instead. Thing agrees, and the B-Sides intend to go on their way.

However, it turns out the Fantastic Four were actually in town to see Jughandle, not Doctor Dark. Jughandle's ability to step outside the timestream is equated to poking a needle through a large tapestry; doing it a few times has no negative effect, but repeated events could put holes in the fabric of time. Jughandle then drinks a glass of "juice" from the Invisible Woman. Before they can finish talking and thus fully understanding each other, the teams are summoned to deal with another local crisis.

At a nearby diner, a man is holding two cats hostage in a microwave. Jughandle correctly identifies the cats as Skrull shapeshifters, and the two superteams head off to stop him. Thanks to an earlier adventure, Jughandle recognizes both Skrulls and Kree at the scene. The B-Sides and the FF stop the situation before it can escalate into a minor Kree-Skrull War repeat.

But after saving the day and going their separate ways, Jughandle is disenchanted with the Fantastic Four. Meanwhile, the Fantastic Four are marooned on the New Jersey Turnpike after Mize sabotaged their ship and the Human Torch had left on a date. Mister Fantastic explains to Ben and Sue that the "juice" he gave Jughandle actually rearranged his molecular structure to stop the destructive nature of his timestream powers. Reed wished that he had gotten the chance to tell Jughandle that before the Fantastic Four left Raven's Perch.

The B-Sides receive media recognition in an error-ridden newspaper article.

== Bibliography ==
- B-Sides #1-3
