= Ivan Velez Jr. =

America cartoonist and writer (born 1961)

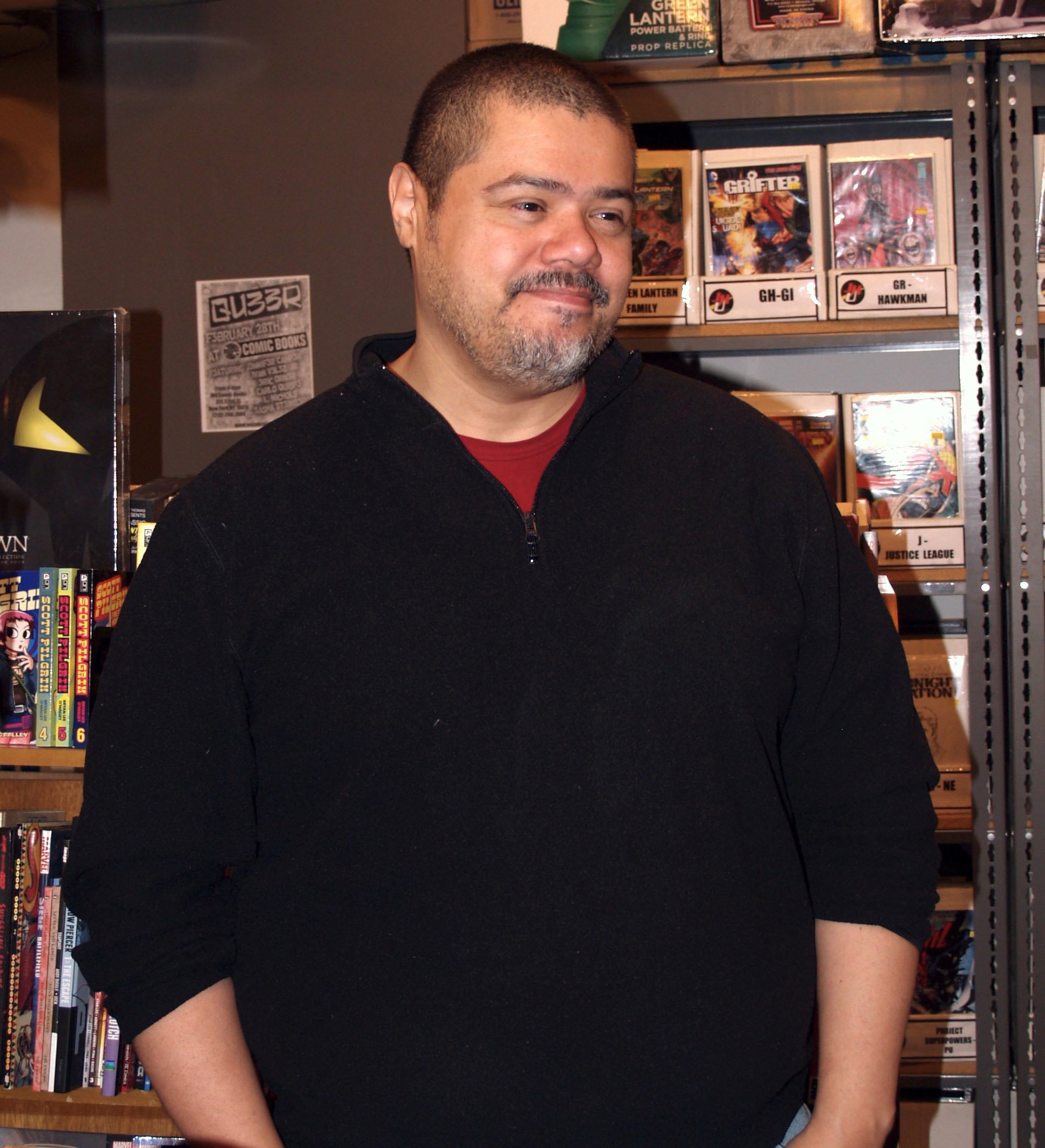
- Velez at JHU Comics in Manhattan
- Areas: Superhero comics LGBT comics
- Notable works: Blood Syndicate; Ghost Rider; Tales of the Closet

Ivan Velez Jr. (born 1961) is an openly gay Latino American cartoonist, writer, museum educator, and teaching artist, known for creating the comic book series Tales of the Closet, and for his work with the DC Comics imprint Milestone Media, and with Marvel Comics.

== Early life ==
Ivan Velez Jr. was born in the Bronx, New York in 1961 to parents of Puerto Rican descent.

== Career ==
Velez created one of the first narratives about queer youth in his series Tales of the Closet (1987-1993). The author notes that he struggled watching people in the gay community die from a lack of education and communication about AIDS. So, he created a comic to educate both straight and queer teens.

This brought him to Milestone Media in the early 1990s, where he expanded Latino representation to include queer, straight, and multicultural Latino characters in Milestone Media's series Blood Syndicate. Notably, Velez's characters portrayed more than one type of Latino identity; such as Dominican, Puerto Rican, Afro-Hispanic. Velez brought Latino and Afro-Caribbean characters to Marvel Comics, as during his work on Vol 3, issues 70-93 and -1 of Ghost Rider, when he depicted supporting characters of color.

Following the cancellation of the Milestone line, Velez worked as a freelance writer for DC's other imprints and for Marvel Comic, where he was the company's second Latino writer, after George Pérez. These assignments included Ghost Rider, Venom, and Abominations for Marvel; Eradicator and Extreme Justice for DC's main superhero line; Flinch for Vertigo; and Scooby-Doo, Dexter's Laboratory, Ben 10, and The Powerpuff Girls for DC's Johnny DC imprint. In working for Marvel and DC, Velez has been one of the few Puerto Rican writers to work for the Big Two in American comics publishing.

Velez illustrated works that commented on his experience as gay, Latino man in the United States. His work has appeared in Gay Comix, for which he illustrated one cover, Details, HX Magazine, and the anthology Qu33r. Velez edited graphic novels for Dutton Books (Dead High Yearbook), earning an award from the American Library Association.

In an interview with CBR.com, Velez stated that the style in which he rendered the series differed from his previous work by depicting various peoples and time periods of American history with a greater sense of realism.

=== Themes ===
Believing that Americans, including younger people, were a growing market for more characters and superheroes of color, Velez used his work to advocate for LGBT characters, including young members of that community. Velez acknowledges that the mid 80s were the time of the multicultural initiative and the onset of the AIDS crisis, which he sought to address through frank explorations of issues facing gay and transgender teens in his educational and LGBTQ awareness project, Tales of the Closet.

Velez differentiates his comics from mainstream heroes like Superman or Batman in that popular stories are restricted to predictable narratives that corporate foresees will sell. Velez felt that mainstream heroes were depicted through a typically upper-middle class and white perspective, while other races were portrayed through negative stereotypes, and sought to make comics for children who hailed from different economic, educational or ethnic backgrounds.

== Personal life ==
As of 2017, Velez resides in the Bronx.

== Printed publications ==
- 1987 to 1994, Hetrick Martin Institute, Tales of The Closet 1 – 9 (ongoing series) by Ivan Velez
- 1994 to 1997, Milestone Media: Blood Syndicate, Static, My Name Is Holocaust (ongoing monthlies) by Ivan Velez
- 1996 to 1998: Marvel Comics: Ghost Rider, Venom: Sign Of The Cross, and Abominations (ongoing monthlies)
- 1996 to 2009: DC Comics: Adventure Comics, Flinch, Power Puff Girls, Scooby Doo, Ben 10, and Eradicator (one-shots and mini-series)
- date 2004/2007, Juicy Mother 1 & 2 (short stories, Published by Jennifer Camper, Story and art by Ivan Velez Jr.
- 2005, Tales of The Closet: ONE TWO THREE, The Collected Tales Volume 1 (stand-alone, By Ivan Velez Jr.
- 2007, Dead High Yearbook (standalone), Published by Dutton/Penguin, Edited, co-written and co-designed by Ivan Velez Jr.

== Awards ==
- 2004 Xeric Grant
