= Abominations (comic book) =

Comic book limited series

Publication information
- Publisher: Marvel Comics
- Format: Limited series
- Publication date: December 1996 – February 1997
- No. of issues: 3

Creative team
- Written by: Ivan Velez Jr.
- Penciller: Angel Medina
- Inker: Brad Vancata

Abominations is a three-issue Marvel Comics limited series created by Ivan Velez Jr. (writer), Angel Medina (penciller) and Brad Vancata (inker). The series ran from December 1996 to February 1997. It was a follow-up tale from the Incredible Hulk storylines "Ghosts of the Past" and "Future Imperfect".

== Plot ==
The story begins a few weeks after the end of Future Imperfect with a small group of the Gravity Police (the Maestro's soldiers) wandering outside of the city. They were forced to leave the city following the fall of the Maestro and have since run out of supplies, such as food and water. The group stumbles upon a water supply, only to find the future incarnation of the Abomination. The Abomination questions the soldiers, who reveal that they are from Castle Maestro and that the Maestro himself has been presumed dead. Upon hearing this, the Abomination has his mutates attack and kill the soldiers while he heads for the now vacant Castle Maestro.

Meanwhile, we are introduced to Captain Agarn, the elected ruler of the city. Rick Jones' niece Janis also ran but lost the election, which does not bother Janis as long as she is around to keep an eye on him. The rebels then discover a secret chamber with a large, silver box inside of it. While the rebels ponder if the tubes attached to the large box mean that something is alive inside, the Abomination and his mutates launch their attack on the city. The rebels counterattack but are soundly defeated. Kaspin, right hand advisor to the Abomination, senses the presence of the being in the secret chamber. Horrified, the Abomination smashes open the box to find the Shulk, the future incarnation of the She-Hulk inside. Kaspin estimates that she has been in there for at least seven years. Upon hearing this, the Abomination sets down his "poor Shulk" and in a blind rage, orders all humans to be slaughtered and that he will wipe any trace of the Maestro from the Earth.

The mutates stumble upon the rebels, but are scared off by Betty #6, who claims to be a former consort of the Maestro and that she is carrying his unborn child. The scene shifts back to Castle Maestro, where the Abomination has placed Shulk in the royal bedchamber. As he watches her sleep, he remembers past events. It is revealed that the Shulk was 'almost' triumphant in combat against the Maestro. The Abomination had joined her in later battles (it is unclear if anyone else joined them in the battles), and they were defeated each time. After the Maestro murdered three villages to prove his dominance, the Shulk went after him and was never seen again. Kaspin interrupts and tells him of the woman claiming to be pregnant with the Maestro's child, and the Abomination responds by ordering her death, claiming Betty #6's carcass will make a suitable wedding gift for his long lost love.

The mutates return, this time set on killing Betty #6 and her unborn child. The rebels flee, only to find themselves cornered in their old headquarters. However, they stumble upon the time machine used to bring the Professor Hulk to the future. Janis quickly sends the group of rebels back in time, while she stays behind. They find themselves in the middle of a fight between the police and the homeless of East Village New York in the late 1990s. The rebels disarm the police and give the guns to the homeless, but one of the rebels, Char, is shot in the process. The police arrive with reinforcements and engage the rebels in battle. Meanwhile, Abomination questions the captured Janis about the location of Betty #6. Janis resists, but the Abomination orders Kaspin to put Janis in as much pain as possible in order to get her to talk. The Abomination leaves to check on Shulk, who awakens and violently knocks him away, furious that he has touched her. He departs, but not before reminding her that he is King and that she will be his or perish.

Janis impresses Kaspin with her strength of will, and he then realizes that he will have to kill her as she will not betray her friends. Despite his loyalty to the Abomination for taking care of him after his parents deserted him, he cannot bring himself to kill and releases Janis. Back in the past, the rebels are saved by the appearance of the Abomination, who takes the rebels and homeless underground with him. In the future, the Abomination scolds Kaspin for allowing Janis to escape and orders him to retrieve her. Upon hearing this, a bounty hunter named Quarry introduces himself and offers to track down Janis. The Abomination agrees, giving Quarry three hours to find her. After he leaves, the Abomination makes another advance at Shulk, who promptly knocks him unconscious. She departs on a mission to the past, determined not to allow anyone like the Maestro to exist again. Shulk brings Kaspin with her, ordering him to locate Betty #6 so she can kill the unborn child of the Maestro.

Back in the past, the Abomination scolds the homeless people he protects for venturing up to the surface as Betty #6 goes into labor with her child and Char lies dying in the tunnels. Po, a large rebel who had been knocked unconscious during the fight with the police, awakens and is instantly angered by the site of the Abomination of the past. He grabs a pipe and attacks the Abomination, who shrugs off the attack and flings Po across the tunnel. The rebels attack, unaware that Char has died. Meanwhile, Shulk arrives in the past in great pain. Kaspin senses something wrong with her brain, but Shulk shrugs it off and burrows underground to find Betty #6.

In the future, the Abomination is presented the lone surviving human, a woman who reveals herself as a cybertech. In exchange for her life, she fits him with cybernetic extensions to fix his various injuries accumulated throughout the years. In the past, Shulk finds the tunnels and is confronted by the past Abomination. The story goes back to Janis, who is being pursued by Quarry. She finds the rebels time machine and uses it to transport herself back to the past. However, Quarry jumps in during the middle of the launch and the pair disappear into the timestream, their fate unknown. In the future, the Abomination finds the old factory used by the rebels and destroys it, stranding all of them in the past.

Shulk and the past Abomination do battle, and she succeeds in smashing him through the tunnel. The rebels attack Shulk to protect the baby, but are quickly defeated. She is poised to kill Betty #6, who informs Shulk that the baby is not actually the Maestro's. Betty #6 tells Shulk that it was a lie simply to save herself and the rebels from the mutates. Shulk hesitates, but is still ready to kill them when she suddenly collapses. Kaspin is the cause of her collapse, as cannot allow her to kill a helpless baby. The Abomination smashes back into the tunnel only to find Shulk near death. Shulk calls the Abomination over to her and whispers something to him that only he can hear before she dies.

The Abomination buries both her and Char, but Jennifer Walters is written on the grave. It is never revealed what else she told him, but the reader is told via narration that he will often stand and her grave for hours with tears in his eyes. The rebels decided to stay underground with the homeless and the Abomination. The group renames themselves the Abominations and make trips up to the surface at night to help and fight crime.
