= WildGuard =

WildGuard is a comic book series about a "made-for-TV" superhero team. The series was created, written and drawn by Todd Nauck and published by Image Comics. Nauck initially published the characters in 1993, in ashcan comics he published while sending out submissions. It was published again in 2003. The set of miniseries and one-shots chronicles the exploits of the superhero team, the initial miniseries, WildGuard: Casting Call, introduced the characters in an American Idol-style program. Fans voted online on a fifth member onto the team.

The first six issues were later collected in Trade paperback.

== Voting ==
WildGuard began mainstream publication in 2003 with an online voting campaign where fans could pick who they wanted to make the team at the end of issue 6. It was also supported on the official WildGuard website with a web campaign forum in which fans would discuss their picks and try to sway the voting. Fans could view pictures, description of powers and back-stories for 46 characters in order to cast their votes.

== Collected editions ==
The trade paperback collecting issues 1–6 was followed with WildGuard: Firepower, the two-issue WildGuard: Fool's Gold mini-series, and WildGuard: Insider #1–3 in May 2008.
